= List of songs recorded by Weezer =

Songs recorded by Weezer

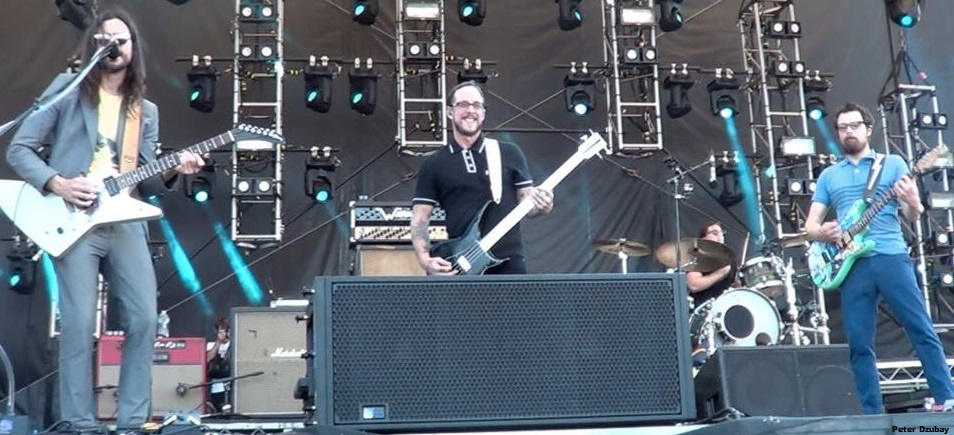
Weezer performing in 2015. From left to right: Brian Bell, Scott Shriner, Patrick Wilson, and Rivers Cuomo.

This is a list of every song ever released by American rock band Weezer. It gives information about songwriter(s), original release, and year of release. It contains all the songs of the previously released albums, singles and EPs, and all B-sides.

== Songs ==
Key
†	Indicates song not written by members of the band
‡	Indicates song released as a single

Name of song, writer(s), original release, and year of release
Song	Writer(s)	Original release	Year	Ref.
"1 More Hit"	Rivers Cuomo	Van Weezer	2021	
"Across the Meadow"	Rivers Cuomo	SZNZ: Spring (vinyl)	2022	
"Across the Sea"	Rivers Cuomo	Pinkerton	1996	
"Africa" ‡ (Toto cover)	David Paich; Jeff Porcaro †	Non-album single (Note: Later released on Weezer (Teal Album) (2019))	2018	
"Ain't Got Nobody"	Rivers Cuomo	Everything Will Be Alright in the End	2014	
"All My Favorite Songs" ‡	Rivers Cuomo; Ilsey Juber; Ben Johnson; Ashley Gorley	OK Human	2021	
"All My Friends Are Insects" (Yo Gabba Gabba! featuring Weezer)	Adam Deibert †	Music Is...Awesome! Volume 2	2010	
"All the Good Ones"	Rivers Cuomo; Luke Atlas; Coleman Trapp	Van Weezer	2021	
"All This Love"	Rivers Cuomo Patrick Wilson	SZNZ: Spring	2022	
"Aloo Gobi"	Rivers Cuomo	OK Human	2021	
"Always" ‡	Rivers Cuomo	Non-album single (B-side to "Island in the Sun") (UK CD1)	2001	
"American Gigolo"	Rivers Cuomo	Maladroit	2002	
"The Angel and the One"	Rivers Cuomo	Weezer (Red Album)	2008	
"Angels on Vacation"	Rivers Cuomo	SZNZ: Spring	2022	
"Any Friend of Diane's"	Rivers Cuomo	Pacific Daydream	2017	
"Automatic"	Patrick Wilson	Weezer (Red Album)	2008	
"Autopilot"	Rivers Cuomo	Death to False Metal	2010	
"Back to the Shack"	Rivers Cuomo; Jacob Kasher	Everything Will Be Alright in the End	2014	
"Basketball"	Rivers Cuomo	SZNZ: Winter	2022	
"Beach Boys"	Rivers Cuomo	Pacific Daydream	2017	
"Beginning of the End"	Rivers Cuomo; Billy Joel (Note: Contains an interpolation of "The Longest Time" by Billy Joel.)	Van Weezer	2021	
"Beverly Hills" ‡	Rivers Cuomo	Make Believe	2005	
"Billie Jean" (Michael Jackson cover)	Michael Jackson †	Weezer (Teal Album)	2019	
"Bird with a Broken Wing"	Rivers Cuomo	OK Human	2021	
"Blowin' My Stack"	Rivers Cuomo; Brian Bell; Scott Shriner	Death to False Metal	2010	
"Blue Dream"	Rivers Cuomo; Ozzy Osbourne; Randy Rhoads; Bob Daisley	Van Weezer	2021	
"Blue Like Jazz"	Rivers Cuomo	SZNZ: Summer	2022	
"Brave New World"	Rivers Cuomo; Linda Perry	Hurley	2010	
"Brightening Day" ‡	Rivers Cuomo	Non-album single (B-side to "Island in the Sun") (UK CD2)	2001	
"The British Are Coming"	Rivers Cuomo	Everything Will Be Alright in the End	2014	
"Buddy Holly" ‡	Rivers Cuomo	Weezer (Blue Album)	1994	
"Burndt Jamb"	Rivers Cuomo	Maladroit	2002	
"Butterfly"	Rivers Cuomo	Pinkerton	1996	
"Byzantine"	Rivers Cuomo; Laura Jane Grace	Weezer (Black Album)	2019	
"California Kids"	Rivers Cuomo; Dan Wilson	Weezer (White Album)	2016	
"California Snow"	Rivers Cuomo	Weezer (Black Album)	2019	
"Can't Dance, Don't Ask Me"	Rivers Cuomo	SZNZ: Autumn	2022	
"Can't Knock the Hustle" ‡	Rivers Cuomo	Weezer (Black Album)	2019	
"Can't Stop Partying" (featuring Lil Wayne)	Rivers Cuomo; Dwayne Carter; Jermaine Dupri	Raditude	2009	
"C.E.O."	Rivers Cuomo	Weezer (Gold Album)	2026	
"Christmas Celebration"	Rivers Cuomo	Christmas CD	2001	
"The Christmas Song"	Rivers Cuomo	Christmas CD	2001	
"Cleopatra" ‡	Rivers Cuomo	Everything Will Be Alright in the End	2014	
"Cold Dark World"	Rivers Cuomo; Scott Shriner	Weezer (Red Album)	2008	
"Crab"	Rivers Cuomo	Weezer (Green Album)	2001	
"Cuomoville"	Rivers Cuomo	SZNZ: Summer	2022	
"Da Vinci" ‡	Rivers Cuomo; Josh Alexander	Everything Will Be Alright in the End	2014	
"The Damage in Your Heart"	Rivers Cuomo	Make Believe	2005	
"Dark Enough to See the Stars"	Rivers Cuomo	SZNZ: Winter	2022	
"Dead Roses"	Rivers Cuomo	OK Human	2021	
"Death and Destruction"	Rivers Cuomo	Maladroit	2002	
"December"	Rivers Cuomo	Maladroit	2002	
"The Deep and Dreamless Sleep"	Rivers Cuomo	SZNZ: Winter	2022	
"Devotion" ‡	Rivers Cuomo	Non-album single (B-side to "El Scorcho")	1996	
"Do You Wanna Get High?" ‡	Rivers Cuomo	Weezer (White Album)	2016	
"Don't Let Go"	Rivers Cuomo	Weezer (Green Album)	2001	
"Dope Nose" ‡	Rivers Cuomo	Maladroit	2002	
"Dreamin'"	Rivers Cuomo	Weezer (Red Album)	2008	
"El Scorcho" ‡	Rivers Cuomo	Pinkerton	1996	
"The End of the Game" ‡	Rivers Cuomo; Tim Pagnotta	Van Weezer	2021	
"Endless Bummer"	Rivers Cuomo; Brian Bell; Luther Russell	Weezer (White Album)	2016	
"Eulogy for a Rock Band"	Rivers Cuomo; Daniel Brummel; Ryen Slegr	Everything Will Be Alright in the End	2014	
"Everybody Get Dangerous"	Rivers Cuomo	Weezer (Red Album)	2008	
"Everything Happens for a Reason"	Rivers Cuomo	OK Human	2021	
"Everybody Needs Salvation"	Rivers Cuomo	Non-album single	2015	
"Everybody Wants to Rule the World" (Tears for Fears cover)	Roland Orzabal; Ian Stanley; Chris Hughes †	Weezer (Teal Album)	2019	
"Everyone"	Rivers Cuomo	Death to False Metal	2010	
"Fake Smiles and Nervous Laughter"	Rivers Cuomo	Weezer (White Album) (deluxe edition)	2016	
"Fall Together"	Rivers Cuomo	Maladroit	2002	
"Falling for You"	Rivers Cuomo	Pinkerton	1996	
"Feels Like Summer" ‡	Rivers Cuomo; Patrick Morrissey; Jonny Coffer; Jonathan Rotem; David Dahlquist; Dan Goldberger	Pacific Daydream	2017	
"The First Noel"	Traditional †	Christmas with Weezer	2008	
"Foolish Father"	Rivers Cuomo; Patrick Stickles	Everything Will Be Alright in the End	2014	
"Francesca"	Rivers Cuomo	SZNZ: Autumn	2022	
"Freak Me Out"	Rivers Cuomo	Make Believe	2005	
"Friend of a Friend"	Rivers Cuomo	Weezer (White Album) (deluxe edition)	2016	
"The Futurescope Trilogy: I. The Waste Land"	Rivers Cuomo	Everything Will Be Alright in the End	2014	
"The Futurescope Trilogy: II. Anonymous"	Rivers Cuomo	Everything Will Be Alright in the End	2014	
"The Futurescope Trilogy: III. Return to Ithaka"	Rivers Cuomo	Everything Will Be Alright in the End	2014	
"The Garden of Eden"	Rivers Cuomo	SZNZ: Spring	2022	
"Get Me Some"	Rivers Cuomo; Lukasz Gottwald	Raditude (deluxe edition)	2009	
"Get Off on the Pain"	Rivers Cuomo	SZNZ: Autumn	2022	
"Get Right"	Rivers Cuomo; Jonny Coffer; Johnny McDaid; Josh Alexander	Pacific Daydream	2017	
"Getchoo"	Rivers Cuomo	Pinkerton	1996	
"Getting Up and Leaving"	Rivers Cuomo; Patrick Wilson	Pinkerton (deluxe edition)	2010	
"The Girl Got Hot"	Rivers Cuomo; Butch Walker	Raditude	2009	
"(Girl We Got A) Good Thing"	Rivers Cuomo	Weezer (White Album)	2016	
"Glorious Day"	Rivers Cuomo	Weezer (Green Album)	2001	
"Go Away"	Rivers Cuomo; Bethany Cosentino	Everything Will Be Alright in the End	2014	
"The Good Life" ‡	Rivers Cuomo	Pinkerton	1996	
"Grapes of Wrath"	Rivers Cuomo	OK Human	2021	
"The Greatest Man That Ever Lived (Variations on a Shaker Hymn)" ‡	Rivers Cuomo	Weezer (Red Album)	2008	
"Hang On" ‡	Rivers Cuomo; Rick Nowels	Hurley	2010	
"Happy Hour" ‡	Rivers Cuomo; Chris Sernel; Seann Bowe	Pacific Daydream	2017	
"Happy Together" (The Turtles cover)	Alan Gordon; Garry Bonner †	Weezer (Teal Album)	2019	
"Hark! The Herald Angels Sing"	Traditional †	Christmas with Weezer	2008	
"Hash Pipe" ‡	Rivers Cuomo	Weezer (Green Album)	2001	
"Haunt You Every Day"	Rivers Cuomo	Make Believe	2005	
"Heart Songs"	Rivers Cuomo	Weezer (Red Album)	2008	
"Here Comes the Rain"	Rivers Cuomo	OK Human	2021	
"Hero" ‡	Rivers Cuomo; Daniel Bedingfield; Daniel Omelio; Denzel Baptiste; David Biral; Dave Bassett	Van Weezer	2021	
"High as a Kite"	Rivers Cuomo; Josh Alexander	Weezer (Black Album)	2019	
"Hold Me"	Rivers Cuomo	Make Believe	2005	
"Holiday"	Rivers Cuomo	Weezer (Blue Album)	1994	
"I Do"	Rivers Cuomo	Non-album single (B-side to "Hash Pipe")	2001	
"I Don't Want to Let You Go"	Rivers Cuomo	Raditude	2009	
"I Don't Want Your Loving"	Rivers Cuomo	Death to False Metal	2010	
"I Just Threw Out the Love of My Dreams"	Rivers Cuomo	Non-album single (B-side to "The Good Life")	1996	
"I Love the U.S.A."	Rivers Cuomo; Sam Hollander	Weezer (White Album) (deluxe edition)	2016	
"I Need Some of That"	Rivers Cuomo; Tim Pagnotta; Josh Alexander; Billy Steinberg; Geoffrey Downes; John Wetton; Donald Roeser	Van Weezer	2021	
"I Swear It's True"	Rivers Cuomo	Weezer (Blue Album) (deluxe edition)	2004	
"I Want a Dog" ‡	Rivers Cuomo	SZNZ: Winter	2022	
"I Want to Be Something"	Rivers Cuomo	Hurley (deluxe edition)	2010	
"I'm a Believer"	Neil Diamond †	Shrek Forever After	2010	
"I'm a Robot"	Rivers Cuomo	Death to False Metal	2010	
"I'm Just Being Honest"	Rivers Cuomo; Ammar Malik; David Hodges	Weezer (Black Album)	2019	
"I'm Your Daddy" ‡	Rivers Cuomo; Lukasz Gottwald	Raditude	2009	
"I've Had It Up to Here"	Rivers Cuomo; Justin Hawkins	Everything Will Be Alright in the End	2014	
"I've Thrown It All Away"	Rivers Cuomo; Patrick Wilson; Jason Cropper	Van Weezer (vinyl)	2021	
"Iambic Pentameter"	Rivers Cuomo	SZNZ: Winter	2022	
"(If You're Wondering If I Want You To) I Want You To" ‡	Rivers Cuomo; Butch Walker	Raditude	2009	
"In the Garage"	Rivers Cuomo	Weezer (Blue Album)	1994	
"In the Mall"	Patrick Wilson	Raditude	2009	
"Island in the Sun" ‡	Rivers Cuomo	Weezer (Green Album)	2001	
"It's Always Summer in Bikini Bottom"	Rivers Cuomo	The SpongeBob Movie: Sponge on the Run (soundtrack)	2021	
"It's Been So Long"	Rivers Cuomo	Non-album single	2019	
"Jacked Up"	Rivers Cuomo; Jonathan Coffer; Hugh Pescod	Weezer (White Album)	2016	
"Jamie"	Rivers Cuomo	DGC Rarities Vol. 1	1994	
"Keep Fishin'" ‡	Rivers Cuomo	Maladroit	2002	
"King"	Rivers Cuomo	Weezer (Red Album) (deluxe edition)	2008	
"King of the World" ‡	Rivers Cuomo; Jarrad Kritzstein	Weezer (White Album)	2016	
"Knock-down Drag-out"	Rivers Cuomo	Weezer (Green Album)	2001	
"La Brea Tar Pits"	Rivers Cuomo	OK Human	2021	
"L.A. Girlz"	Rivers Cuomo; Brian Bell; Luther Russell	Weezer (White Album)	2016	
"La Mancha Screwjob"	Rivers Cuomo; Josh Alexander	Pacific Daydream	2017	
"The Last Days of Summer"	Rivers Cuomo; Ryan Spraker; Toby Wincorn; Tom Peyton	Non-album single	2016	
"Lawn Chair"	Rivers Cuomo	SZNZ: Summer	2022	
"Let It All Hang Out"	Rivers Cuomo; Jermaine Dupri; Jacknife Lee	Raditude	2009	
"Let's Sew Our Pants Together"	Rivers Cuomo	The Kitchen Tape	1992	
"A Little Bit of Love" ‡	Rivers Cuomo; Dave Gibson; Jax; Wayne Wilkins	SZNZ: Spring	2022	
"Living in L.A."	Rivers Cuomo; Jonny Coffer; Jerome Williams	Weezer (Black Album)	2019	
"Lonely Girl"	Rivers Cuomo; Josh Alexander	Everything Will Be Alright in the End	2014	
"Long Time Sunshine"	Rivers Cuomo	Pinkerton (deluxe edition)	2010	
"Losing My Mind"	Rivers Cuomo	Death to False Metal	2010	
"Lost in the Woods" (Jonathan Groff cover)	Robert Lopez; Kristen Anderson-Lopez †	Frozen II (Original Motion Picture Soundtrack)	2019	
"Love Explosion"	Rivers Cuomo	Maladroit	2002	
"Love is the Answer"	Rivers Cuomo; Jacknife Lee	Raditude	2009	
"Lullaby for Wayne"	Rivers Cuomo; Patrick Wilson	Weezer (Blue Album) (deluxe edition)	2004	
"Memories"	Rivers Cuomo	Hurley	2010	
"Mexican Fender"	Rivers Cuomo; Tobias Gad	Pacific Daydream	2017	
"Mirror Image"	Rivers Cuomo	OK Human	2021	
"Miss Sweeney"	Rivers Cuomo; Sarah C. Kim	Weezer (Red Album) (deluxe edition)	2008	
"Mr. Blue Sky" (Electric Light Orchestra cover)	Jeff Lynne †	Weezer (Teal Album)	2019	
"My Best Friend"	Rivers Cuomo	Make Believe	2005	
"My Evaline" (Note: Erroneously listed as "My Adeline" on the Australian version of "Undone – The Sweater Song", This was corrected on the Deluxe Edition of the Blue Album.)	Traditional; arranged by Sigmund Spaeth †	Non-album single (B-side to "Undone – The Sweater Song")	1994	
"My Name Is Jonas"	Rivers Cuomo; Patrick Wilson; Jason Cropper	Weezer (Blue Album)	1994	
"Mykel & Carli" ‡	Rivers Cuomo	Non-album single (B-side to "Undone – The Sweater Song")	1994	
"No One Else"	Rivers Cuomo	Weezer (Blue Album)	1994	
"No Other One"	Rivers Cuomo	Pinkerton	1996	
"No Scrubs" (TLC cover)	Kevin "She'kspere" Briggs; Kandi Burruss; Tameka "Tiny" Cottle; Lisa "Left Eye" Lopes †	Weezer (Teal Album)	2019	
"Numbers"	Rivers Cuomo	OK Human	2021	
"O Come All Ye Faithful"	Traditional †	Christmas with Weezer	2008	
"O Holy Night"	Traditional †	Christmas with Weezer	2008	
"O Girlfriend"	Rivers Cuomo	Weezer (Green Album)	2001	
"The Odd Couple"	Rivers Cuomo	Death to False Metal	2010	
"Oh Lisa"	Rivers Cuomo	WWF Tough Enough 2	2002	
"The One That Got Away"	Rivers Cuomo	SZNZ: Winter	2022	
"Only in Dreams"	Rivers Cuomo	Weezer (Blue Album)	1994	
"Opening Night"	Rivers Cuomo	SZNZ: Spring	2022	
"The Opposite of Me"	Rivers Cuomo	SZNZ: Summer	2022	
"The Other Way"	Rivers Cuomo	Make Believe	2005	
"Outta Here"	Rivers Cuomo	Death to False Metal (deluxe edition)	2010	
"Paperface"	Rivers Cuomo	Weezer (Blue Album) (deluxe edition)	2004	
"Paranoid" (Black Sabbath cover)	Geezer Butler; Tony Iommi; Ozzy Osbourne; Bill Ward †	Weezer (Teal Album)	2019	
"Pardon Me"	Rivers Cuomo	Make Believe	2005	
"Peace"	Rivers Cuomo	Make Believe	2005	
"Perfect Situation" ‡	Rivers Cuomo	Make Believe	2005	
"Photograph" ‡	Rivers Cuomo	Weezer (Green Album)	2001	
"Piece of Cake"	Rivers Cuomo	Weezer (Black Album)	2019	
"Pig"	Rivers Cuomo	Weezer (Red Album) (deluxe edition)	2008	
"Pink Triangle" ‡	Rivers Cuomo	Pinkerton	1996	
"Playing My Piano"	Rivers Cuomo	OK Human	2021	
"Pork and Beans" ‡	Rivers Cuomo	Weezer (Red Album)	2008	
"Portia"	Rivers Cuomo	SZNZ: Summer (vinyl)	2022	
"Possibilities"	Rivers Cuomo	Maladroit	2002	
"Precious Metal Girl"	Rivers Cuomo; Nick Long	Van Weezer	2021	
"The Prettiest Girl in the Whole Wide World"	Rivers Cuomo	Raditude (deluxe edition)	2009	
"The Prince Who Wanted Everything"	Rivers Cuomo; Brian Bell; Luther Russell	Weezer (Black Album)	2019	
"Prom Night"	Rivers Cuomo	Weezer (White Album) (Japanese bonus track)	2016	
"Put Me Back Together"	Rivers Cuomo; Tyson Ritter; Nick Wheeler	Raditude	2009	
"QB Blitz"	Rivers Cuomo	Pacific Daydream	2017	
"Rainbow Connection" (Weezer and Hayley Williams, Kermit the Frog cover)	Paul Williams; Kenneth Ascher †	Muppets: The Green Album	2011	
"Records" ‡	Rivers Cuomo; Grant Phillip Michaels; Sam Hollander	SZNZ: Summer	2022	
"Represent" ‡	Rivers Cuomo; Rick Nowels	Non-album digital single	2010	
"Rosanna" (Toto cover)	David Paich †	Non-album song	2018	
"Ruling Me"	Rivers Cuomo; Dan Wilson	Hurley	2010	
"Run Away"	Rivers Cuomo; Ryan Adams	Hurley	2010	
"Run Over by a Truck"	Rivers Cuomo	Raditude (deluxe edition)	2009	
"Run, Raven, Run"	Rivers Cuomo	SZNZ: Autumn	2022	
"Say It Ain't So" ‡	Rivers Cuomo	Weezer (Blue Album)	1994	
"Screens"	Rivers Cuomo	OK Human	2021	
"She Needs Me"	Rivers Cuomo	Van Weezer	2021	
"Sheila Can Do It"	Rivers Cuomo; Kevin Ridel	Van Weezer	2021	
"Sheraton Commander"	Rivers Cuomo	SZNZ: Winter	2022	
"Shine Again"	Patrick Wilson	Weezer (Gold Album)	2026	
"Should She Stay or Should She Go"	Rivers Cuomo	SZNZ: Autumn	2022	
"Silent Night"	Franz Xaver Gruber; Joseph Mohr †	Christmas with Weezer	2008	
"Simple Pages"	Rivers Cuomo	Weezer (Green Album)	2001	
"Slave"	Rivers Cuomo	Maladroit	2002	
"Slob"	Rivers Cuomo	Maladroit	2002	
"Smart Girls"	Rivers Cuomo; Tony Kanal; Jimmy Harry	Hurley	2010	
"Smile"	Rivers Cuomo	Weezer (Green Album)	2001	
"The Sound of Drums"	Rivers Cuomo (Note: Contains portions of the poems, "Back to the River" by Abigail Spinner McBride, and "Air I Am" by Andras Corban-Arthen.)	SZNZ: Spring	2022	
"Space Rock"	Rivers Cuomo	Maladroit	2002	
"The Spider"	Rivers Cuomo	Weezer (Red Album) (deluxe edition)	2008	
"Stand by Me" (Ben E. King cover)	Ben E. King; Jerry Leiber; Mike Stoller †	Weezer (Teal Album)	2019	
"Starlight" ‡	Rivers Cuomo	Non-album single (B-side to "Hash Pipe")	2001	
"Sugar Booger" ‡	Rivers Cuomo	Non-album single (B-side to "Island in the Sun") (UK CD2)	2001	
"Summer Elaine and Drunk Dori"	Rivers Cuomo	Weezer (White Album)	2016	
"Surf Wax America"	Rivers Cuomo; Patrick Wilson	Weezer (Blue Album)	1994	
"Susanne" ‡	Rivers Cuomo	Non-album single (B-side to "Undone – The Sweater Song")	1994	
"Sweet Dreams (Are Made of This)" (Eurythmics cover)	Annie Lennox; David A. Stewart †	Weezer (Teal Album)	2019	
"Sweet Mary"	Rivers Cuomo; Josh Alexander	Pacific Daydream	2017	
"Take Control"	Rivers Cuomo	Maladroit	2002	
"Take On Me" (a-ha cover)	Magne Furuholmen; Morten Harket; Pål Waaktaar †	Weezer (Teal Album)	2019	
"Tastes Like Pain"	Rivers Cuomo	SZNZ: Autumn	2022	
"Teenage Victory Song"	Rivers Cuomo	Non-album single (B-side to "Hash Pipe") (UK 7")	2001	
"Thank God for Girls" ‡	Rivers Cuomo; Alex Goose; Michael Balzer; Alex Balzer; Bill Petti	Weezer (White Album)	2016	
"Thank You and Goodnight"	Rivers Cuomo	SZNZ: Summer	2022	
"Thief, You've Taken All That Was Me"	Rivers Cuomo	The Kitchen Tape	1992	
"This Is Such a Pity" ‡	Rivers Cuomo	Make Believe	2005	
"Thought I Knew"	Brian Bell	Weezer (Red Album)	2008	
"Time Flies"	Rivers Cuomo; Mac Davis	Hurley	2010	
"Tired of Sex"	Rivers Cuomo	Pinkerton	1996	
"Too Many Thoughts in My Head"	Rivers Cuomo	Weezer (Black Album)	2019	
"Tragic Girl"	Rivers Cuomo	Pinkerton (deluxe edition)	2010	
"Trainwrecks"	Rivers Cuomo; Desmond Child	Hurley	2010	
"Trampoline"	Rivers Cuomo	Death to False Metal	2010	
"Trippin' Down the Freeway"	Rivers Cuomo	Raditude	2009	
"Troublemaker" ‡	Rivers Cuomo	Weezer (Red Album)	2008	
"Turning Up the Radio"	Various (Note: Written by Rivers Cuomo, Alfredo Robert Carballo, Paul Dutton, Patrick Gannon, Joshua Godinez, Daniel James Kelsch, Reshad Malik, Cameron L. Maris, Sam Mitchell, Taylor Morden, Daniel Powell, Lauren Sonder, Nishant Thakur, Justin Vail, Mike Danger, Kingsly Vanata and Ryan Wiesbrock.)	Death to False Metal	2010	
"Un-Break My Heart" (Toni Braxton cover)	Diane Warren †	Death to False Metal	2010	
"The Underdogs"	Rivers Cuomo; Kazuhiro Hara	Raditude (deluxe edition)	2009	
"Undone – The Sweater Song" ‡	Rivers Cuomo	Weezer (Blue Album)	1994	
"Unspoken"	Rivers Cuomo	Hurley	2010	
"Velouria" (Pixies cover)	Black Francis †	Where Is My Mind? A Tribute to the Pixies	1999	
"Viva la Vida" (Coldplay cover)	Guy Berryman; Jonny Buckland; Will Champion; Chris Martin †	Hurley (deluxe edition)	2010	
"Waiting on You"	Rivers Cuomo	Non-album single (B-side to "The Good Life")	1996	
"The Way I Hate You"	Rivers Cuomo	SZNZ: Autumn (vinyl)	2022	
"We Are All on Drugs" ‡	Rivers Cuomo	Make Believe	2005	
"We Might as Well Be Strangers" (with Wednesday)	Brian Bell, Rivers Cuomo, Allan Grigg, Karly Hartzman, Luther Russell	Weezer (Gold Album)	2026	
"We Wish You A Merry Christmas"	Traditional; arranged by Nick Cannon, Kevin Writer and Doug Holzapfel †	Christmas with Weezer	2008	
"Weekend Woman"	Rivers Cuomo	Pacific Daydream	2017	
"What Happens After You?"	Rivers Cuomo; Anthony De La Torre; Desmond Child; Eric Bazilian; Rob Wells	SZNZ: Autumn	2022	
"What's the Good of Being Good"	Rivers Cuomo	SZNZ: Summer	2022	
"Where's My Sex?"	Rivers Cuomo; Greg Wells	Hurley	2010	
"Why Bother?"	Rivers Cuomo	Pinkerton	1996	
"Why Don't You Get Me"	Rivers Cuomo	SZNZ: Winter (vinyl)	2022	
"Wild at Heart"	Rivers Cuomo	SZNZ: Spring	2022	
"Wind in Our Sail"	Rivers Cuomo; Scott Chesak; Ryan Spraker	Weezer (White Album)	2016	
"The World Has Turned and Left Me Here"	Rivers Cuomo; Patrick Wilson	Weezer (Blue Album)	1994	
"Worry Rock" (Green Day cover)	Billie Joe Armstrong; Mike Dirnt; Tré Cool †	A Different Shade of Green: Tribute to Green Day	2003	
"Yellow Camaro"	Brian Bell	Death to False Metal (deluxe edition)	2010	
"You Gave Your Love to Me Softly"	Rivers Cuomo	Angus: Music from the Motion Picture	1995	
"You Might Think" (The Cars cover)	Ric Ocasek †	Cars 2 soundtrack	2011	
"You Won't Get with Me Tonight"	Rivers Cuomo	Pinkerton (deluxe edition)	2010	
"Zombie Bastards" ‡	Rivers Cuomo	Weezer (Black Album)	2019	
