= Weezer discography =

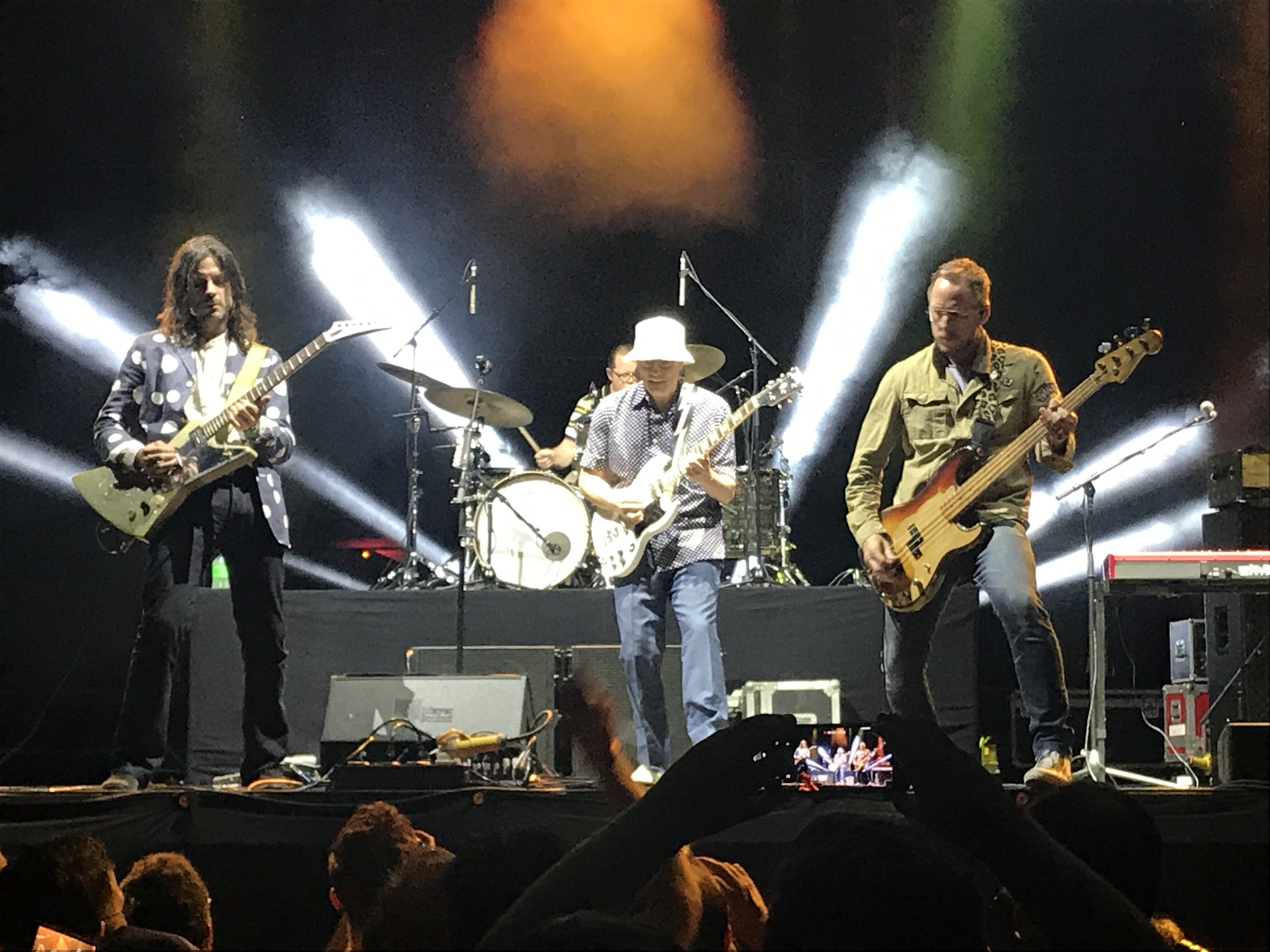
- Weezer performing at Musikfest in Bethlehem, Pennsylvania in 2019
- Studio albums: 20
- Extended plays: 6
- Compilation albums: 4
- Singles: 47
- Video albums: 1
- Music videos: 55
- Promotional singles: 19

Studio album releases timeline
1994	Weezer (Blue Album)
1995
1996	Pinkerton
1997
1998
1999
2000
2001	Weezer (Green Album)
2002	Maladroit
2003
2004
2005	Make Believe
2006
2007
2008	Weezer (Red Album)
2009	Raditude
2010	Hurley
2011
2012
2013
2014	Everything Will Be Alright in the End
2015
2016	Weezer (White Album)
2017	Pacific Daydream
2018
2019	Weezer (Teal Album)
2019	Weezer (Black Album)
2020
2021	OK Human
2021	Van Weezer
2022	SZNZ: Spring
2022	SZNZ: Summer
2022	SZNZ: Autumn
2022	SZNZ: Winter
2023
2024
2025
2026	Weezer (Gold Album)

The American band Weezer has released 20 studio albums, four compilation albums, one video album, six extended plays, 47 singles, 19 promotional singles, and 55 music videos. Weezer's self-titled debut studio album, often referred to as The Blue Album, was released in May 1994 through DGC Records. The album was a commercial success, peaking at number 16 on the US Billboard 200 and spawning the singles "Undone – The Sweater Song" and "Buddy Holly", both of which were responsible for launching Weezer into mainstream success with the aid of music videos directed by Spike Jonze. As of October 2, 2024, the album has sold 5 million copies in the United States and has been certified 5 times platinum by the Recording Industry Association of America (RIAA), becoming the band's best selling album to date. Following the success of their debut album, Weezer took a break from touring for the Christmas holidays. Lead singer Rivers Cuomo began piecing together demo material for Weezer's second studio album. Cuomo's original concept for the album was a space-themed rock opera, Songs from the Black Hole. Ultimately, the Songs from the Black Hole album concept was dropped; the band, however, continued to utilize songs from these sessions into work for their second studio album. Pinkerton was released as the band's second studio album in September 1996. Peaking at number 19 on the Billboard 200, it was considered a critical and commercial failure at the time of its release, selling far less than its quintuple platinum predecessor. However, in the years following its release, it has seen much critical and commercial championing.

Following a hiatus after the release of Pinkerton, Weezer returned to critical and commercial prominence in May 2001 with the release of their third studio album, a second self-titled album, commonly referred to as The Green Album. A year later, the band released their fourth studio album Maladroit to positive reviews. The album peaked at number three on the Billboard 200 and was certified gold by the RIAA. "Dope Nose" and "Keep Fishin'", the album's two singles, both reached the top 15 on the Alternative Songs chart. In May 2005, the band released their fifth studio album, Make Believe. Despite receiving mixed reviews from critics, the album was a commercial success, peaking at number two on the Billboard 200 and being certified platinum by the RIAA. It spawned four singles, including the international hit "Beverly Hills", which became the band's first top ten hit on the US Billboard Hot 100 and the top-selling download of 2005.

The band's third self-titled studio album – commonly referred to as The Red Album – was released in June 2008. The album peaked at number four on the Billboard 200. The first single from the album, "Pork and Beans", spent 11 weeks at the top of the Alternative Songs chart. Shortly after releasing Hurley, the band released a compilation album titled Death to False Metal in November 2010. An album consisting of previously unreleased tracks recorded at several points throughout Weezer's career, Death to False Metal peaked at number 48 on the Billboard 200. Worldwide album sales have been verified through RIAA and Geffen Records.

== Albums ==
=== Studio albums ===
List of studio albums, with selected chart positions, sales figures and certifications
Title	Album details	Peak chart positions										Sales	Certifications
Title	Album details	US	AUS	AUT	CAN	GER	IRL	NOR	NED	NZ	UK	Sales	Certifications
Weezer (Blue Album)	Released: May 10, 1994; Label: DGC, Geffen; Formats: CD, CS, LP, SACD	16	—	47	9	61	—	35	48	6	23	US: 3,550,000	RIAA: 5× Platinum; BPI: Platinum; MC: 3× Platinum; RMNZ: Platinum
Pinkerton	Released: September 24, 1996; Label: DGC, Geffen; Formats: CD, CS, LP	19	38	41	10	65	—	18	94	11	43	US: 1,100,000	RIAA: Platinum; BPI: Gold; MC: Gold
Weezer (Green Album)	Released: May 15, 2001; Label: DGC, Geffen; Formats: CD, CS, LP, download	4	25	15	2	21	53	7	—	25	31	US: 1,673,000	RIAA: Platinum; BPI: Gold; MC: Platinum; RMNZ: Gold
Maladroit	Released: May 14, 2002; Label: DGC, Geffen; Formats: CD, CS, LP, download	3	11	22	2	29	15	4	95	—	16	US: 621,000	RIAA: Gold; BPI: Silver
Make Believe	Released: May 10, 2005; Label: DGC, Geffen; Formats: CD, CS, LP, download	2	19	17	1	32	7	7	82	20	11	US: 1,254,000	RIAA: Platinum; MC: Platinum
Weezer (Red Album)	Released: June 3, 2008; Label: DGC, Interscope; Formats: CD, LP, slotMusic, download	4	21	39	2	60	27	21	— (Note: Weezer (the Red Album) did not enter the Dutch Album Top 100, but peaked at number 22 on the Dutch Alternative Albums chart.)	15	21	US: 484,000	
Raditude	Released: October 30, 2009; Label: DGC, Interscope; Formats: CD, LP, download	7	36	—	10	94	—	36	—	—	80		
Hurley	Released: September 14, 2010; Label: Epitaph; Formats: CD, LP, download	6	55	—	11	63	64	29	98	34	49		
Everything Will Be Alright in the End	Released: October 7, 2014; Label: Republic; Formats: CD, CS, LP, download	5	45	—	10	95	34	—	—	33	37		
Weezer (White Album)	Released: April 1, 2016; Label: Atlantic; Formats: CD, LP, download	4	28	51	10	51	27	—	49	28	24		
Pacific Daydream	Released: October 27, 2017; Label: Atlantic; Formats: CD, LP, download	23	64	—	41	—	—	—	177	— (Note: Pacific Daydream did not enter the NZ Top 40 Albums Chart, but peaked at number one on the NZ Heatseeker Albums Chart.)	68		
Weezer (Teal Album)	Released: January 24, 2019; Label: Atlantic; Formats: CD, LP, download	5	49	—	48	—	66	—	—	29	60		
Weezer (Black Album)	Released: March 1, 2019; Label: Atlantic; Formats: CD, LP, CS, download	19	— (Note: Weezer (the Black Album) did not enter the ARIA Albums Chart, but peaked at number 24 on the ARIA Digital Album Chart.)	—	56	96	—	—	—	—	73		
OK Human	Released: January 29, 2021; Label: Atlantic; Formats: CD, LP, download	41	—	—	69	35	54	—	— (Note: OK Human did not enter the Dutch Album Top 100, but peaked at number 30 on the Dutch Vinyl 33 chart.)	—	91		
Van Weezer	Released: May 7, 2021; Label: Atlantic; Formats: CD, LP, CS, download	11	83	26	18	25	—	—	— (Note: Van Weezer did not enter the Dutch Album Top 100, but peaked at number 32 on the Dutch Vinyl 33 chart.)	—	30		
SZNZ: Spring (Note: All SZNZ releases were classified as EPs on original release. Following the release of Weezer (Gold Album) in 2026, they were reclassified as studio albums.)	Released: March 20, 2022; Label: Atlantic; Formats: CD, vinyl, download	— (Note: SZNZ: Spring did not enter the Billboard Top 200, but entered the US Current Album Sales chart at number 86.)	—	—	—	—	—	—	—	—	— (Note: SZNZ: Spring did not enter the UK Albums Chart, but peaked at number 37 on the UK Album Downloads Chart.)		
SZNZ: Summer	Released: June 21, 2022; Label: Atlantic; Formats: CD, vinyl, download	—	—	—	—	—	—	—	—	—	— (Note: SZNZ: Summer did not enter the UK Albums Chart, but peaked at number 80 on the UK Album Sales Chart.)		
SZNZ: Autumn	Released: September 22, 2022; Label: Atlantic; Formats: CD, vinyl, download	—	—	—	—	—	—	—	—	—	— (Note: SZNZ: Autumn did not enter the UK Albums Chart, but peaked at number 48 on the UK Album Downloads Chart.)		
SZNZ: Winter	Released: December 21, 2022; Label: Atlantic; Formats: CD, vinyl, download	—	—	—	—	—	—	—	—	—	— (Note: SZNZ: Winter did not enter the UK Albums Chart, but peaked at number 96 on the UK Album Sales Chart.)		
Weezer (Gold Album)	Released: August 21, 2026; Label: Reprise (physical), Warner (digital); Formats: CD, LP, CS, download	35	50	35	—	—	—	—	—	32	45		
"—" denotes a recording that did not chart or was not released in that territory.

=== Compilation albums ===
List of compilation albums
Title	Album details	Peak chart positions		
Title	Album details	US	CAN	SCO
Death to False Metal	Released: November 2, 2010; Label: Geffen; Formats: CD, LP, download	48	71	—
iTunes Originals – Weezer	Released: November 9, 2010; Label: DGC; Formats: Download	—	—	—
Dusty Gems & Raw Nuggets	Released: January 10, 2010; Label: Geffen; Formats: CD, LP	— (Note: Dusty Gems & Raw Nuggets did not enter the Billboard Top 200, but entered the US Album Sales chart at number 49.)	—	—
1192	Released: April 18, 2026; Label: Ernest Jenning Record Co.; Formats: LP	—	—	97
"—" denotes a recording that did not chart or was not released in that territory.

=== Video releases ===
List of video albums, with selected chart positions and certifications
Title	Album details	Peak chart positions		Certifications
Title	Album details	US Video	UK Video	Certifications
Weezer – Video Capture Device: Treasures from the Vault 1991–2002	Released: 2004; Label: Geffen; Formats: DVD	1	13	RIAA: Gold

== Extended plays ==
List of extended plays, with selected chart positions
Title	EP details	Peak chart positions		
Title	EP details	US	SCO	UK Sales
The Good Life	Released: 1997; Label: DGC; Formats: CD	—	—	—
Christmas CD	Released: December 2000; Label: Geffen; Formats: CD, download	—	—	—
The Lion and the Witch	Released: September 24, 2002; Label: Geffen; Formats: CD, vinyl	—	—	—
Six Hits	Released: November 2008; Label: DGC; Formats: CD	168	—	—
Christmas with Weezer	Released: December 16, 2008; Label: DGC; Formats: Download	173	—	—
Raditude ...Happy Record Store Day!	Released: April 17, 2010; Label: DGC; Formats: CD	—	—	—
"—" denotes a recording that did not chart or was not released in that territory.

== Singles ==
=== 1990s–2000s ===
List of singles released in the 1990s and 2000s, with selected chart positions and certifications, showing year released and album name
Title	Year	Peak chart positions										Certifications	Album
Title	Year	US	US Alt.	AUS	CAN	IRL	JPN	NED	SCO	SWE	UK	Certifications	Album
"Undone – The Sweater Song"	1994	57	6	63	—	—	—	—	31	—	35	RIAA: 2× Platinum; BPI: Silver; RMNZ: Gold	Weezer (Blue Album)
"Buddy Holly"	1994	— (Note: "Buddy Holly" did not enter the Billboard Hot 100, but peaked at number 18 on the Hot 100 Airplay chart.)	2	68	6	19	—	27	10	14	12	RIAA: 4× Platinum; BPI: Platinum; RMNZ: Platinum	Weezer (Blue Album)
"Say It Ain't So"	1995	— (Note: "Say It Ain't So" did not enter the Billboard Hot 100, but peaked at number 51 on the Hot 100 Airplay chart.)	7	—	—	—	—	—	43	—	37	RIAA: 7× Platinum; BPI: Gold; RMNZ: 3× Platinum	Weezer (Blue Album)
"El Scorcho"	1996	—	19	70	—	—	73	—	45	10	50	RIAA: Gold	Pinkerton
"The Good Life"	1996	—	32	88	—	—	—	—	—	—	—		Pinkerton
"Hash Pipe"	2001	— (Note: "Hash Pipe" did not enter the Billboard Hot 100, but peaked at number 6 on the Bubbling Under Hot 100 Singles chart, which acts as a 25-song extension to the Hot 100.)	2	—	16	37	—	74	15	—	21	RIAA: 2× Platinum; BPI: Silver; RMNZ: Gold	Weezer (Green Album)
"Island in the Sun"	2001	— (Note: "Island in the Sun" did not enter the Billboard Hot 100, but peaked at number 11 on the Bubbling Under Hot 100 Singles chart, which acts as a 25-song extension to the Hot 100.)	11	78	— (Note: "Island in the Sun" did not enter the Billboard Canadian Hot 100, but peaked at number 42 on the Canadian Digital Song Sales chart.)	—	—	—	30	—	31	RIAA: 7× Platinum; BPI: Platinum; RMNZ: 4× Platinum	Weezer (Green Album)
"Photograph"	2001	—	17	—	—	—	—	—	—	—	—		Weezer (Green Album)
"Dope Nose"	2002	—	8	—	—	—	—	—	—	—	—		Maladroit
"Keep Fishin'"	2002	—	15	—	—	36	—	—	27	—	29		Maladroit
"Beverly Hills"	2005	10	1	—	—	34	—	—	11	—	9	RIAA: 5× Platinum; BPI: Silver; RMNZ: Platinum	Make Believe
"We Are All on Drugs"	2005	—	10	—	—	46	—	—	36	—	47		Make Believe
"Perfect Situation"	2005	51	1	—	—	—	—	—	—	—	—	RIAA: Platinum	Make Believe
"Pork and Beans"	2008	64	1	95	29	33	50	— (Note: "Pork and Beans" did not enter the Netherlands' Single Top 100 but peaked on the Netherlands' TMF Superchart at number 14.)	15	—	33	RIAA: Platinum	Weezer (Red Album)
"Troublemaker"	2008	— (Note: "Troublemaker" did not enter the Billboard Hot 100, but peaked at number 21 on the Bubbling Under Hot 100 Singles chart, which acts as a 25-song extension to the Hot 100.)	2	—	51	—	—	—	—	—	—	RIAA: Gold	Weezer (Red Album)
"The Greatest Man That Ever Lived"	2008	—	35	—	—	—	—	—	—	—	—		Weezer (Red Album)
"(If You're Wondering If I Want You To) I Want You To"	2009	81	2	87	24	—	16	—	—	—	— (Note: "(If You're Wondering If I Want You To) I Want You To" did not enter the UK Singles Chart, but peaked at number 28 on the UK Physical Singles Chart.)	RIAA: Platinum	Raditude
"—" denotes a recording that did not chart or was not released in that territory.

=== 2010s–2020s ===
List of singles released in the 2010s and 2020s, with selected chart positions and certifications, showing year released and album name
Title	Year	Peak chart positions										Certifications	Album
Title	Year	US	US Alt.	US Rock	CAN	CAN Rock	JPN	MEX Ingl. Air.	NZ Hot	SWI	UK Sales	Certifications	Album
"I'm Your Daddy"	2010	—	18	26	—	41	—	18	—	—	—		Raditude
"Represent"	2010	—	—	—	—	—	—	—	—	—	—		Non-album single
"Memories"	2010	—	21	29	—	23	20	48	—	—	—		Hurley
"Back to the Shack"	2014	—	5	13	72	1	64	35	—	—	— (Note: "Back to the Shack" did not enter the UK Singles Chart, but peaked at number 38 on the UK Physical Singles Chart.)		Everything Will Be Alright in the End
"Cleopatra"	2014	—	—	—	—	—	—	—	—	—	—		Everything Will Be Alright in the End
"Da Vinci"	2014	—	32	—	—	41	—	—	—	—	—		Everything Will Be Alright in the End
"Thank God for Girls"	2015	—	11	13	—	24	—	—	—	—	—		Weezer (White Album)
"Do You Wanna Get High?"	2015	—	—	— (Note: "Do You Wanna Get High?" did not enter the Hot Rock & Alternative Songs chart, but peaked at number 35 on the Rock Digital Song Sales chart.)	—	—	—	—	—	—	—		Weezer (White Album)
"King of the World"	2016	—	17	39	—	—	—	—	—	—	—		Weezer (White Album)
"Feels Like Summer"	2017	—	2	12	—	34	—	—	—	79	—	RIAA: Gold	Pacific Daydream
"Happy Hour"	2017	—	9	20	—	—	—	—	—	—	—		Pacific Daydream
"Rosanna"	2018	—	— (Note: "Rosanna" did not enter the Alternative Songs chart, but peaked at number 13 on the Alternative Digital Song Sales chart.)	29	—	—	—	—	—	—	—		Non-album single
"Africa"	2018	51	1	5	— (Note: "Africa" did not enter the Billboard Canadian Hot 100, but peaked at number 34 on the Canadian Digital Song Sales chart.)	33	—	42	—	—	— (Note: "Africa" did not enter the UK Singles Chart, but peaked at number 7 on the UK Physical Singles Chart.)	RIAA: Platinum	Weezer (Teal Album)
"California Snow"	2018	—	—	—	—	—	—	—	—	—	—		Weezer (Black Album)
"Can't Knock the Hustle"	2018	—	10	23	—	—	—	—	—	—	—		Weezer (Black Album)
"Zombie Bastards"	2018	—	—	—	—	—	—	—	—	—	—		Weezer (Black Album)
"The End of the Game"	2019	—	2	9	—	2	—	—	36	—	—		Van Weezer
"Hero"	2020	—	1	17	—	2	—	—	—	—	—		Van Weezer
"Beginning of the End" (original or Wyld Stallyns Edit)	2020	—	—	—	—	—	—	—	40	—	—		Van Weezer
"All My Favorite Songs" (original or featuring AJR)	2021	— (Note: "All My Favorite Songs" did not enter the US Billboard Hot 100 but peaked on the US Digital Songs chart at number 43.)	1	15	—	10	—	—	—	86	—		OK Human
"I Need Some of That"	2021	—	—	— (Note: "I Need Some of That" did not enter the Hot Rock & Alternative Songs chart, but peaked at number 28 on the Triple A Airplay chart.)	—	—	—	—	—	—	—		Van Weezer
"Tell Me What You Want"	2021	—	—	—	—	—	—	—	—	—	—		Non-album single
"A Little Bit of Love"	2022	—	1	28	— (Note: "A Little Bit of Love" did not enter the Billboard Canadian Hot 100, but peaked at number 45 on the Canadian Digital Song Sales chart.)	2	— (Note: "A Little Bit of Love" did not enter the Billboard Japan Hot 100 chart, but peaked at number 19 on the Billboard Japan Hot Overseas Songs chart.)	—	—	—	—		SZNZ: Spring
"Records" (with or without Noga Erez)	2022	—	1	— (Note: "Records" did not enter the Hot Rock & Alternative Songs chart, but peaked at number 6 on the Rock and Alternative Airplay chart.)	—	12	—	—	—	—	—		SZNZ: Summer
"I Want a Dog"	2022	—	—	—	—	—	—	—	—	—	—		SZNZ: Winter
"Buddy Holly" / "Say it Ain't So" (with Olivia Rodrigo)	2025	—	—	—	—	—	—	—	—	—	5		Non-album single
"Shine Again"	2026	—	—	—	—	—	— (Note: "Shine Again" did not enter the Billboard Japan Hot 100 chart, but peaked at number 18 on the Billboard Japan Hot Overseas Songs chart.)	—	—	—	—		Weezer (Gold Album)
"We Might as Well Be Strangers" (featuring Wednesday)	2026	—	1	— (Note: "We Might as Well Be Strangers" did not enter the Hot Rock & Alternative Songs chart, but peaked at number seven on the Rock and Alternative Airplay chart.)	—	18	—	—	—	—	—		Weezer (Gold Album)
"C.E.O."	2026	—	—	—	—	—	—	—	—	—	—		Weezer (Gold Album)
"—" denotes a recording that did not chart or was not released in that territory.

=== Promotional singles ===
List of promotional singles, with selected chart positions, showing year released and album name
Title	Year	Peak chart positions								Certifications	Album
Title	Year	US	US Alt.	US Rock	CAN	CAN Rock	KAZ	MEX Ingl. Air.	NZ Hot	Certifications	Album
"My Name Is Jonas"	1994	—	—	×	—	—	—	×	—	RIAA: Platinum	Weezer (Blue Album)
"Pink Triangle"	1997	—	—	×	—	—	—	×	—		Pinkerton
"This Is Such a Pity"	2006	—	31	×	—	—	—	×	—		Make Believe
"Dreamin'"	2008	—	—	×	—	—	—	×	—		Weezer (Red Album)
"Tripping Down the Freeway"	2010	—	34	—	—	—	—	—	—		Raditude
"Hang On"	2011	—	—	—	—	—	—	—	—		Hurley
"Go Away"	2015	63	3	13	56	32	143	—	—		Everything Will Be Alright in the End
"L.A. Girlz"	2016	—	—	—	—	—	—	—	—		Weezer (White Album)
"California Kids"	2016	—	—	36	—	—	—	—	—		Weezer (White Album)
"I Love the USA"	2016	—	— (Note: "I Love the USA" did not enter the Alternative Songs chart, but peaked at number 10 on the Alternative Digital Song Sales chart.)	22	—	—	—	—	—		Weezer (White Album)
"Mexican Fender"	2017	—	—	—	—	—	—	39	—		Pacific Daydream
"Beach Boys"	2017	—	—	—	—	—	—	—	—		Pacific Daydream
"Take On Me"	2019	—	— (Note: "Take On Me" did not enter the Alternative Songs chart, but peaked at number 23 on the Alternative Digital Song Sales chart.)	13	—	—	—	47	28		Weezer (Teal Album)
"High as a Kite"	2019	—	—	—	—	—	—	—	—		Weezer (Black Album)
"Living in L.A."	2019	—	—	—	—	—	—	—	—		Weezer (Black Album)
"Grapes of Wrath"	2021	—	—	—	—	—	—	—	34		OK Human
"All the Good Ones"	2021	—	—	49	—	—	—	—	—		Van Weezer
"Enter Sandman"	2021	—	— (Note: "Enter Sandman" did not enter the Alternative Songs chart, but peaked at number 23 on the Alternative Digital Song Sales chart.)	— (Note: "Enter Sandman" did not enter the Hot Rock & Alternative Songs chart, but peaked at number 14 on the Hot Hard Rock Songs chart.)	—	—	—	—	—		The Metallica Blacklist
"All My Favorite Songs (Live from Hella Mega)"	2021	—	—	—	—	—	—	—	—		Non-album single
"—" denotes a recording that did not chart or was not released in that territory. "×" denotes periods where charts did not exist or were not archived

== Other charted and certified songs ==
List of other charted songs, with selected chart positions, showing year released, certifications, and album name
Title	Year	Peak chart positions					Certifications	Album
Title	Year	US Alt.	US Rock	CAN Rock	MEX Ingl. Air.	NZ Hot	Certifications	Album
"I Just Threw Out the Love of My Dreams"	1996	—	—	—	—	—	RIAA: Gold	Pinkerton
"Let It All Hang Out"	2010	—	—	29	—	—		Raditude
"Rainbow Connection" (with Hayley Williams)	2011	— (Note: "Rainbow Connection" did not enter the Alternative Songs chart, but peaked at number 13 on the Alternative Digital Song Sales chart.)	— (Note: "Rainbow Connection" did not enter the Hot Rock Songs chart, but peaked at number 23 on the Rock Digital Song Sales chart.)	—	—	—		Muppets: The Green Album
"You Might Think"	2011	—	—	—	8	—		Cars 2 soundtrack
"Weekend Woman"	2017	—	—	—	—	—		Pacific Daydream
"Everybody Wants to Rule the World"	2019	— (Note: "Everybody Wants to Rule the World" did not enter the Alternative Songs chart, but peaked at number 17 on the Alternative Digital Song Sales chart.)	16	—	—	33		Weezer (Teal Album)
"Sweet Dreams (Are Made of This)"	2019	—	29	—	—	—		Weezer (Teal Album)
"Happy Together"	2019	—	36	—	28	—		Weezer (Teal Album)
"Paranoid"	2019	—	50	—	—	—		Weezer (Teal Album)
"Mr. Blue Sky"	2019	—	39	—	—	—		Weezer (Teal Album)
"No Scrubs"	2019	—	18	—	—	—		Weezer (Teal Album)
"Billie Jean"	2019	—	37	—	—	—		Weezer (Teal Album)
"Stand by Me"	2019	—	44	—	—	—		Weezer (Teal Album)
"Lost in the Woods"	2019	—	11	—	—	—		Frozen 2 soundtrack
"Think Fast" (Dominic Fike featuring Weezer)	2023	10	15	—	—	22		Sunburn
"—" denotes a recording that did not chart or was not released in that territory.

== Guest appearances ==
List of guest appearances, with other performing artists, showing year released and album name
Title	Year	Other artist(s)	Album
"Jamie"	1994	—N/a	DGC Rarities Volume 1
"Susanne" (Remix)	1995	—N/a	Mallrats soundtrack
"You Gave Your Love to Me Softly"	1995	—N/a	Angus soundtrack
"Mykel and Carli"	1998	—N/a	Hear You Me! A Tribute to Mykel and Carli
"Velouria"	1999	—N/a	Where Is My Mind? A Tribute to the Pixies
"The Christmas Song"	2000	—N/a	The Real Slim Santa
"O Lisa"	2002	—N/a	WWF Tough Enough 2
"Worry Rock"	2003	—N/a	A Different Shade of Green: Tribute to Green Day
"Why Bother?" (live)	2003	—N/a	To Benefit Petra Haden
"You Won't Get with Me Tonight"	2003	—N/a	Gimme Skelter
"Everybody Go Away"	2009	—N/a	Fresh Cuts: Volume 4
"I'm a Believer"	2010	—N/a	Shrek Forever After soundtrack
"All My Friends Are Insects"	2010	—N/a	Music Is...Awesome! Volume 2
"Anastasia"	2010	Mark Douglas	Non-album single
"You Might Think"	2011	—N/a	Cars 2 soundtrack
"Homewrecker"	2017	Vic Mensa	The Autobiography
"California Snow"	2018	—N/a	Spell soundtrack
"Lost in the Woods"	2019	—N/a	Frozen 2 soundtrack
"Pacific Coast Highway (In the Movies)"	2020	Awolnation	Angel Miners & the Lightning Riders
"Beginning of the End" (Wyld Stallyns Edit)	2020	—N/a	Bill & Ted Face the Music soundtrack
"It's Always Summer in Bikini Bottom"	2021	—N/a	The SpongeBob Movie: Sponge on the Run soundtrack
"Wheels Up"	2021	San Holo	BB U OK?

== Music videos ==
Title	Year	Director(s)
"Undone – The Sweater Song"	1994	Spike Jonze
"Buddy Holly"	1994	Spike Jonze
"Say It Ain't So"	1995	Sophie Muller
"El Scorcho"	1996	Mark Romanek
"The Good Life"	1996	Jonathan Dayton and Valerie Faris
"Hash Pipe"	2001	Marcos Siega
"Island in the Sun" (version 1)	2001	Marcos Siega
"Island in the Sun" (version 2)	2001	Spike Jonze
"Photograph"	2001	Karl Koch
"Dope Nose"	2002	Marcos Siega
"Keep Fishin'"	2002	Marcos Siega
"Pink Triangle"	2004	Karl Koch
"Slob"	2004	Karl Koch
"Beverly Hills"	2005	Marcos Siega
"We Are All on Drugs"	2005	Justin Francis
"Perfect Situation"	2005	Marc Webb
"Pork and Beans"	2008	Mathew Cullen
"Troublemaker"	2008	The Malloys
"The Greatest Man That Ever Lived"	2008	Rivers Cuomo
"Thought I Knew'"	2008	Rivers Cuomo
"(If You're Wondering If I Want You To) I Want You To"	2009	Marc Webb
"I'm Your Daddy" (version 1)	2010	Johannes Gamble
"I'm Your Daddy" (version 2)	2010	David Crabtree, Eric von Doymi
"Represent"	2010	—N/a
"Memories"	2010	Jeff Tremaine
"Hang On"	2010	—N/a
"You Might Think"	2011	Tim Wilkerson
"Back to the Shack"	2014	Warren Fu
"Go Away" (featuring Bethany Cosentino)	2015	Brendan Walter and Greg Yagolnitzer
"Thank God for Girls"	2015	Scantron
"King of the World"	2016	Scantron
"L.A. Girlz"	2016	Scantron
"California Kids"	2016	Scantron
"I Love the USA"	2016	Scantron and No. 2 Pencil
"Feels Like Summer"	2017	Brendan Walter and Greg Yagolnitzer
"Mexican Fender"	2017	Lior Molcho
"Feels Like Summer (Roses N’ Weezer Version)"	2017	—N/a
"Happy Hour"	2018	Jim Tews
"Africa" (featuring "Weird Al" Yankovic)	2018	Brendan Walter and Jade Ehlers
"Can't Knock the Hustle" (featuring Pete Wentz) as Rivers Wentz	2018	Guy Blelloch
"Take On Me"	2019	Carrick Moore Gerety
"High as a Kite"	2019	Nathan Presley
"The End of the Game"	2019	Danilo Parra
"California Snow"	2019	Brendan Walter
"Lost in the Woods"	2019	—N/a
"Hero"	2020	Brendan Walter and Jasper Graham
"Beginning Of The End (Wyld Stallyns Edit)"	2020	Brendan Walter
"All My Favorite Songs"	2021	Colin Read
"Grapes of Wrath"	2021	Brendan Walter and Jasper Graham
"All the Good Ones"	2021	Jim Dirschberger
"What Happens After You?"	2022	Peter Quinn
"Dark Enough to See the Stars"	2022	—N/a
"We Might as Well Be Strangers"	2026	Jasper Graham
"C.E.O."	2026	Brendan Walter and Jasper Graham
"Say It Ain’t So - Take 2 (1192 Mix)"	2026	Rob Marshall
