= SZNZ =

SZNZ refers to the 2022 musical project by American rock band Weezer, in which one "album" was released as four mini-albums — one for each season.

- SZNZ: Spring
- SZNZ: Summer
- SZNZ: Autumn
- SZNZ: Winter
