= Land Air Sea =

- 2004 Epitaph release cover

Studio album by The Special Goodness
- Released: February 2003 (original release) January 20, 2004 (Epitaph release)
- Recorded: 2002
- Studio: Sage and Sound; Chad Bamford's house; Sound City Studios
- Genre: Rock
- Label: N.O.S.; The Control Group
- Producer: Patrick Wilson; Atom Willard; Chad Bamford

The Special Goodness chronology
At Some Point, Birds and Flowers Became Interesting (2001)	Land Air Sea (2003)	Natural (2012)

Singles from Land Air Sea
- 1. "Life Goes By" Released: 2003; 2. "N.F.A." Released: 2004

Land Air Sea is the third studio album by The Special Goodness.

== Background and release ==
Natural was originally released in February 2003, through Atom Willard and Patrick Wilson's label N.O.S. Recordings. A remastered, remixed, and re-ordered edition was released through N.O.S and Epitaph Records on January 20, 2004. The original release has three different covers, while the Epitaph version has one. Wilson considers this to be his "first true release" despite it being the third official Special Goodness album.

On July 15, 2022, after being hinted by Karl Koch earlier in the year, a 12"-vinyl version of the album was released through Hello Records. It was pressed on red vinyl and limited to only 1000 copies, with slightly altered cover art and a unique sleeve. The vinyl was accompanied by a podcast mini-series titled The Special Podness hosted by Koch, Wilson, and Willard.

== Personnel ==
Credits adapted from Discogs.

- Patrick Wilson – vocals, guitars, bass, production
- Atom Willard – drums, production
- Joe Barresi – mixing
- Chad Bamford – recording, mixing, production
- Scott Parker – executive producer
- Gene Grimaldi – mastering
- Chris Martin – design
- Robby Fraser – booking

=== 2003 release ===
- Alan Yoshida – mastering
- Errin Famiglia – assistant mastering
- Robert Reed – assistant mastering

== Track listing ==
=== 2003 N.O.S. version ===
1. "Pardon Me"
2. "Life Goes By"
3. "Day In The Autumn"
4. "N.F.A."
5. "Oops"
6. "Inside Your Heart"
7. "Pay No Mind"
8. "Whatever's Going On"
9. "In The Sun"
10. "Move It Along"
11. "The Big Idea"
12. "You Know I'd Like..."

=== 2004 Epitaph version ===
1. "You Know I'd Like..."
2. "Life Goes By"
3. "Day In The Autumn"
4. "N.F.A."
5. "Oops"
6. "The Big Idea"
7. "Whatever's Going On"
8. "In The Sun"
9. "Pardon Me"
10. "Inside Your Heart"
11. "Move It Along"
12. "Pay No Mind"

==== Notes ====
- "Pay No Mind" and "Pardon Me" originally appeared on the band's self-titled debut in 1998.
- "You Know I'd Like...", "Life Goes By", and "Whatever's Going On" originally appeared on At Some Point, Birds And Flowers Became Interesting in 2001.
