= E. J. Wells =

American musician and songwriter (1956–2023)

E.J. Wells
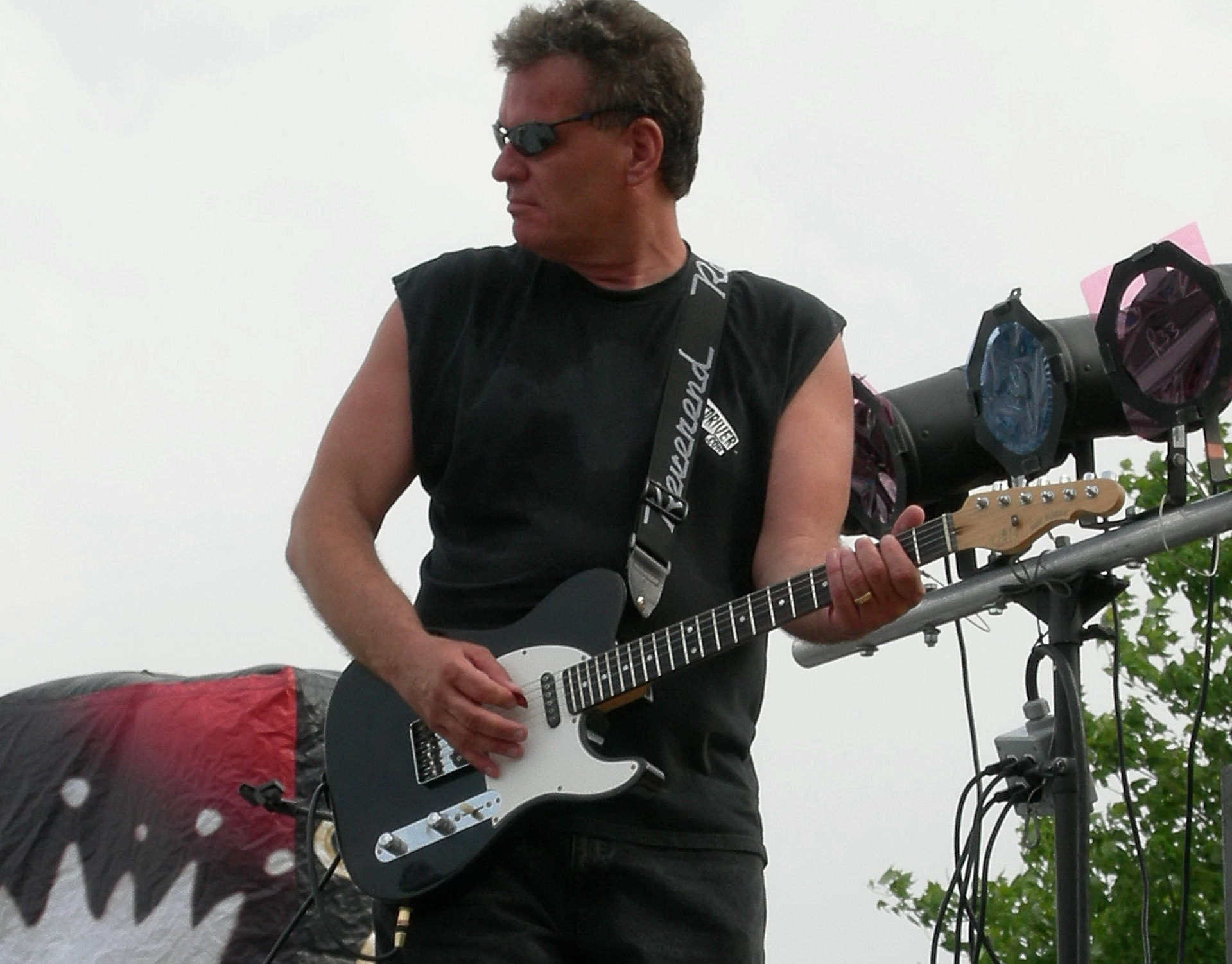

Background information
- Born: Edward Joseph Wells; January 26, 1956; North Tonawanda, New York, U.S.
- Died: September 19, 2023 (aged 67) Toledo, Ohio, U.S.
- Genres: Country-punk; psychobilly; gothabilly; cowpunk
- Occupations: Musician; songwriter
- Instruments: Guitar
- Years active: 1979–2023
- Label: Ruin
- Formerly of: E.J. Wells and the Haymakers
- Spouse: Susan Wells

Edward Joseph Wells (January 26, 1956 – September 19, 2023) was an American musician and songwriter. Part of the punk scene of the late 1970s, he was considered to be a gothabilly or cowpunk musician.

Wells has been performing live, with various bands, since 1979. His most recent project was E.J. Wells and the Bleeding Deacons.

He released an album called Rhyolite on Halloween 2002. Other performers on the album included Rick Nease and Chris Arduser of Psychodots, Graveblankets, and The Bears. The album received praise from other musicians such as Chip Kinman of Cowboy Nation, Chris Casello of The Starlight Drifters, and Scott Shriner of Weezer.

In 2003, Wells opened Happyland, a professional music recording studio.

In 2008, Wells and Dan O'Connor wrote several original songs for an episode of Law & Order: Criminal Intent called "Reunion," and starring veteran rocker Joan Jett.

Wells' song "Hearsedriver" made him something of a celebrity in the hearse club community. Wells, along with Zachary Byron Helm of the Denver Hearse Association created a video for the song. The video got high ratings on YouTube and was showcased on hearseclub.com.

Wells abandoned his work on a new album, but in 2009 completed a video for his song "There's Something in the Graveyard," co-starring longtime friend Scott Shriner of Weezer.

As of 2019, it was rumored Wells was in the perfume business, operating with his Happyland Studio name.

Wells died on September 19, 2023.
