= Natural (The Special Goodness album) =

Studio album by The Special Goodness
- Released: May 22, 2012
- Recorded: 2011
- Studio: The Steakhouse Studio
- Genre: Alternative rock
- Length: 32:59
- Label: Surf Green Records
- Producer: Patrick Wilson

The Special Goodness chronology
Land Air Sea (2003)	Natural (2012)

Natural is the fourth studio album by American alternative rock band The Special Goodness, released on May 22, 2012 on Surf Green Records. Upon the album's release, Patrick Wilson noted, "You can get a six-inch turkey from Subway and be happy for thirty minutes, or get the new The Special Goodness and be happy forever."

== Background and recording ==
The album was recorded solely by founding member Patrick Wilson, with Wilson noting, "At some point, I just sort of stopped trying to make [the Special Goodness] a band and just said, 'I'm not going to be happy unless I do everything myself,' which is totally ironic because that's not really my personality."

== Release ==
Prior to its release, the album was available to stream on Spotify. The only physical copies available are CD-R's produced by Amazon, on demand.

== Track listing ==
All tracks are written by Patrick Wilson.

No.	Title	Length
1.	"Everywhere"	3:59
2.	"It's Only Natural"	2:52
3.	"Nowhere"	4:26
4.	"Hold On"	2:19
5.	"Reasons to Worry"	4:02
6.	"The Diamond"	3:54
7.	"Just Like Me"	3:07
8.	"Head On/Head Out"	2:23
9.	"Sun Off of the Sea"	2:42
10.	"There is a Book"	3:15
Total length:		32:59

== Personnel ==
- Patrick Wilson - vocals, guitar, bass, keyboards, drums
