= Hang On (Weezer song) =

Promotional single by Weezer

from the album Hurley
- Released: February 15, 2011
- Recorded: 2010
- Length: 3:33
- Label: Epitaph
- Songwriters: Rivers Cuomo; Rick Nowels
- Producers: Shawn Everett; Rivers Cuomo

Weezer singles chronology
"Memories" (2010)	"Hang On" (2011)	"Back to the Shack" (2014)

"Hang On" is a song by the band Weezer. The song impacted radio on February 15, 2011. It is the seventh track and second single from their eighth studio album, Hurley (2010). The album version of "Hang On" is co-written by Rick Nowels and features Canadian actor Michael Cera on backing vocals and pseudo-mandolin. The single version features no mandolin, and contains a harder sound.

== Reception ==
Alternative Press calls the song one of the best off of Hurley, along with the song "Run Away", praising its uniqueness and commenting "sounding as musically lively and lyrically honest as any cut off Pinkerton". Rolling Stone regards the song as "power-ballad heaven".

== Track listing ==
1. "Hang On" – 3:33

== Personnel ==
Personnel taken from Hurley CD booklet.

Weezer

- Brian Bell
- Rivers Cuomo
- Scott Shriner
- Patrick Wilson

Additional musicians

- Tony Berg – hurdy-gurdy
- Michael Cera – mandolin and background vocals
