= The Special Goodness =

US musical group (1996–2012)

- Origin: Los Angeles, California, U.S.
- Genres: Alternative rock
- Years active: 1996–2012
- Past members: Patrick Wilson; Atom Willard; Mikey Welsh; Scott Shriner; Pat Finn; Jeb Lewis; Lee Loretta; Murphy Karges
- Website: thespecialgoodness.com

The Special Goodness was an American alternative rock band fronted by Weezer drummer Patrick Wilson. It was formed in 1996 in Los Angeles, California and has released four albums. Wilson is the sole member on every album except for Land Air Sea (2003), on which he collaborates with drummer Atom Willard.

== Discography ==
=== Studio albums ===
Title	Details
The Special Goodness	Released: November 21, 1998; Label: Rock Records; Format: CD
At Some Point, Birds and Flowers Became Interesting	Released: 2001; Label: Self-released; Format: CD
Land Air Sea	Released: March 4, 2003; Label: N.O.S. Recordings, The Control Group, Epitaph Records, Hello Records; Format: CD, LP, digital download, streaming
Natural	Released: May 22, 2012; Label: Surf Green Records; Format: CD, digital download, streaming

=== Singles ===
Title	Year	Peak chart positions	Album
Title	Year	US Hot single sales	Album
"Life Goes By"	2003	19	Land Air Sea
"N.F.A."	2003	—	Land Air Sea
"—" denotes a recording that did not chart or was not released in that territory.

=== Other appearances ===
Title	Year	Album
"Not the Way"	2005	Punk-O-Rama 10
