= Coast Modern =

American indie pop duo

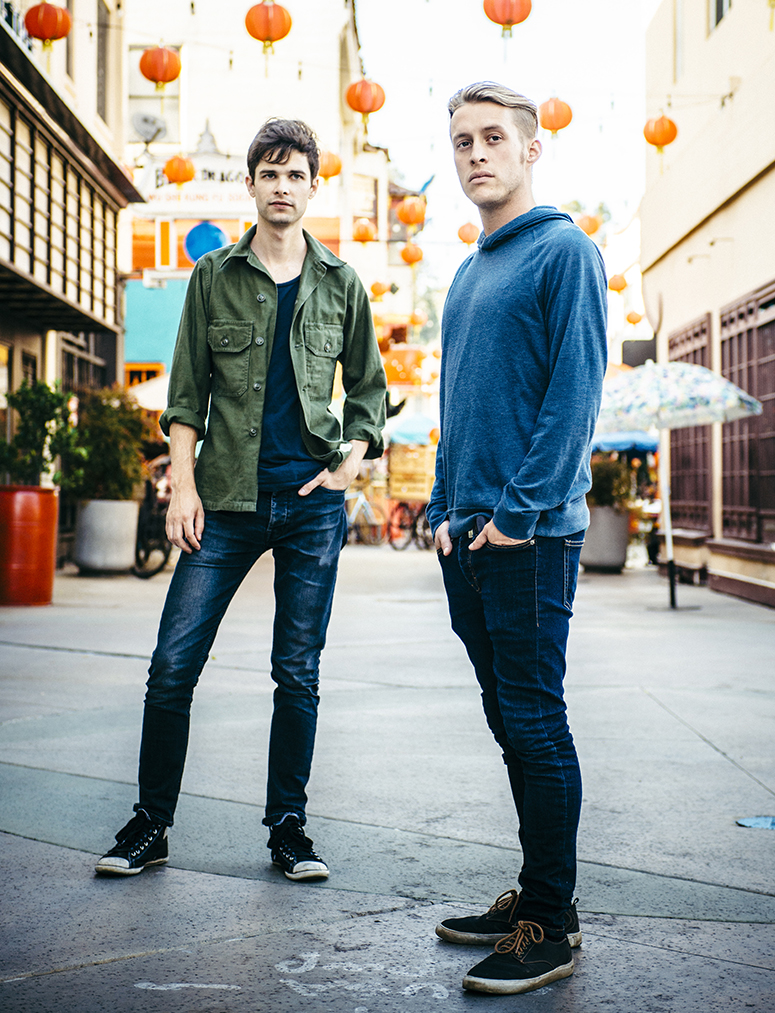
- Coast Modern in Los Angeles on July 6, 2015.

Background information
- Origin: Los Angeles, California, United States
- Genres: Indie pop
- Years active: 2015–2023
- Label: 300 Entertainment
- Members: Luke Atlas; Coleman Trapp
- Website: coastmodernmusic.com

Coast Modern was an American indie pop duo based in Los Angeles, California. The duo consisted of Luke Atlas and Coleman Trapp.

== History ==
=== Early beginnings-2015 ===
Luke Atlas is a Seattle, Washington native and Coleman Trapp is from Los Angeles. Trapp played the drums and piano growing up and sang for the first time at age 23, and Atlas played the guitar in the band Brite Futures, previously known as Natalie Portman's Shaved Head. The two met in Los Angeles shortly after Atlas moved there, and they began writing songs together. After two years of little success between the two, Trapp decided to return to his hometown of Denver. He then began recording some notes on a borrowed acoustic guitar, mailing the recordings to Atlas to listen to. Atlas then recorded a demo around one and mailed it back to Trapp, encouraging him to return to Los Angeles. One of the first songs written and released by Coast Modern is “Hollow Life”, released in 2015.

=== February 2016-2017 ===
In February 2016, the band released their second single “Animals.” Coast Modern first performed live at South by Southwest in 2016. In May 2016, the band released their third single “Guru.” That same month, they began performing on various tour dates with BØRNS, The Temper Trap, and The Wombats, with tour dates that ran through October 2016. Coast Modern is currently signed to 300 Entertainment and +1 Records. Their self-titled debut album was released on July 28, 2017.

=== 2018-2023 ===
In February 2018, the band released a cover of American pop and rock band MGMT's single "Electric Feel" and on October 16, 2019, they released a new single, "Puppy Llama".

Their sophomore album, Going Mainstream, was released on July 30, 2021.

In February 2023, the band disbanded with Luke creating a new band called Wet World with the drummer Steph Baker.

== Influences ==
Atlas has cited The Beatles, The Beach Boys, Led Zeppelin, and Weezer as some of his influences. In his own words, “part of the Coast Modern sound comes from embracing the music we loved when we were young, even if it’s not ‘cool’ now.”

== Discography ==
- Hollow Life (single) 2015
- Animals (single) 2016
- Guru (single) 2016
- The Way It Was (single) 2016
- Comb My Hair (single) 2017
- Pockets Full of No (single) 2017
- Dreamland 2020 (mixtape) 2017
- Dive (single) 2017
- Coast Modern (album) 2017
- Electric Feel (single) 2018
- Puppy Llama (single) 2019
- Going Mainstream (album) 2021
