= Scott Shriner =

American rock bassist (born 1965)

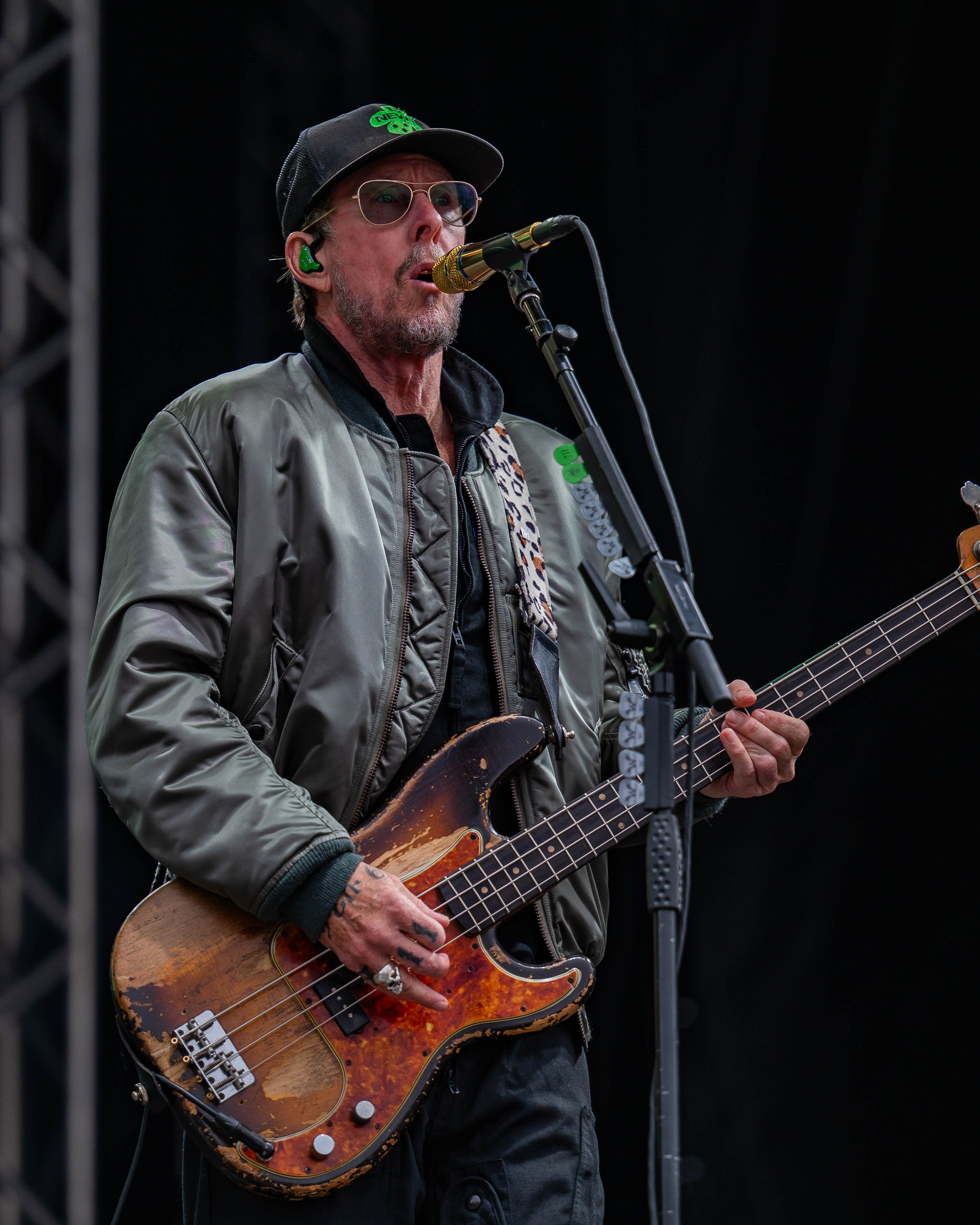
- Shriner performing in 2025

Background information
- Born: Scott Gardner Shriner; July 11, 1965 (age 61); Toledo, Ohio, U.S.
- Genres: Alternative rock; power pop; pop-punk; pop rock; emo
- Occupation: Musician • singer
- Instruments: Bass; vocals; keyboards
- Years active: 1995–present
- Label: Geffen
- Member of: Weezer
- Formerly of: The Special Goodness
- Spouse: Jillian Lauren (m. 2005; sep. 2025)

Scott Gardner Shriner (born July 11, 1965) is an American musician. He has been the bassist of the rock band Weezer since 2001, with whom he has recorded 16 studio albums.

Prior to his musical career, Shriner was a member of the U.S. Marine Corps. At the age of twenty-five, he moved to Los Angeles, California, to pursue a career in music, attending the Musicians Institute. Shriner subsequently performed with multiple independent acts, and toured as a member of Vanilla Ice's backing band, in support of the rapper's nu metal album Hard to Swallow.

In 2001, Shriner joined Weezer on a provisional basis, following the sudden departure of bass guitarist Mikey Welsh, who had left the band for personal reasons. Upon becoming Welsh's full-time replacement, Shriner made his recording debut on the band's fourth studio album, Maladroit (2002).

During the band's tour in support of its fifth studio album, Make Believe (2005), Weezer frontman Rivers Cuomo would at times relinquish his role as lead vocalist to allow Shriner, and his bandmates, Brian Bell and Patrick Wilson, to sing lead vocals on specific songs. This increased vocal responsibility carried over to the band's 2008 self-titled release (aka the "Red Album"), where Shriner co-wrote "Cold Dark World" and performed lead vocals on "Cold Dark World" and "King".

Shriner also performed in his bandmate Patrick Wilson's side-project The Special Goodness for some time.

== Early life ==
Shriner was born in Toledo, Ohio. He took up bass in high school. After being discharged from the U.S. Marine Corps, he found his high school bass teacher Mark Kieswetter, with whom he studied until moving to Los Angeles in 1989. While in Toledo, Shriner and his best friend Rob Weaver started a band called the Seventh Wave with former Newles members Bob Schramm and Bill Whitman. Shriner went on to play with several Toledo bands, namely the Movers, the Fever, the Theresa Harris Band, and Loved by Millions. He then finished his Toledo music experience with Tim Gahagen, Matt Donahue and Brad Coffin in a band called the Great Barbeque Gods.

Shriner also worked at the BitterSweet Farms non-profit organization in the early 90s. Shriner moved to Los Angeles, California at the age of 25 to attend Musicians Institute and went on to play in several bands including Broken, Bomber, Black Elvis, Mystery Train, Electric Love Hogs, Crown and, most notably, Vanilla Ice's backing band, in support of the rapper's nu metal album Hard to Swallow.

== Career ==
In the summer of 2001, Shriner joined Weezer on a provisional basis. Following the departure of their second bassist, Mikey Welsh (who left the band due to personal problems), Shriner was made their full-time bassist. In his first show with Weezer, the 2001 KROQ-FM Inland Invasion, he was attacked by a man later found out to be a friend of his, yet continued to play on as security guards pried the man off his back.

According to Shriner, Rivers Cuomo had initially stated that Shriner was "never" going to be a member of the band, as he was just filling in until Welsh returned. It was only during the photo shoot for the Maladroit album artwork that Shriner realized that he was officially a member of Weezer, having previously only been told to show up for gigs and recording. Shriner became Weezer's third bassist, and the longest-running bassist in Weezer history; he has appeared on seventeen of Weezer's twenty studio albums.

On Weezer's third self-titled album, he co-wrote and sang lead vocals on "Cold Dark World," sang lead vocals on "King" (a deluxe edition track), and sang most of the lead vocals for the band's covers of "The Weight" by the Band and "Oddfellows Local 151" by R.E.M.

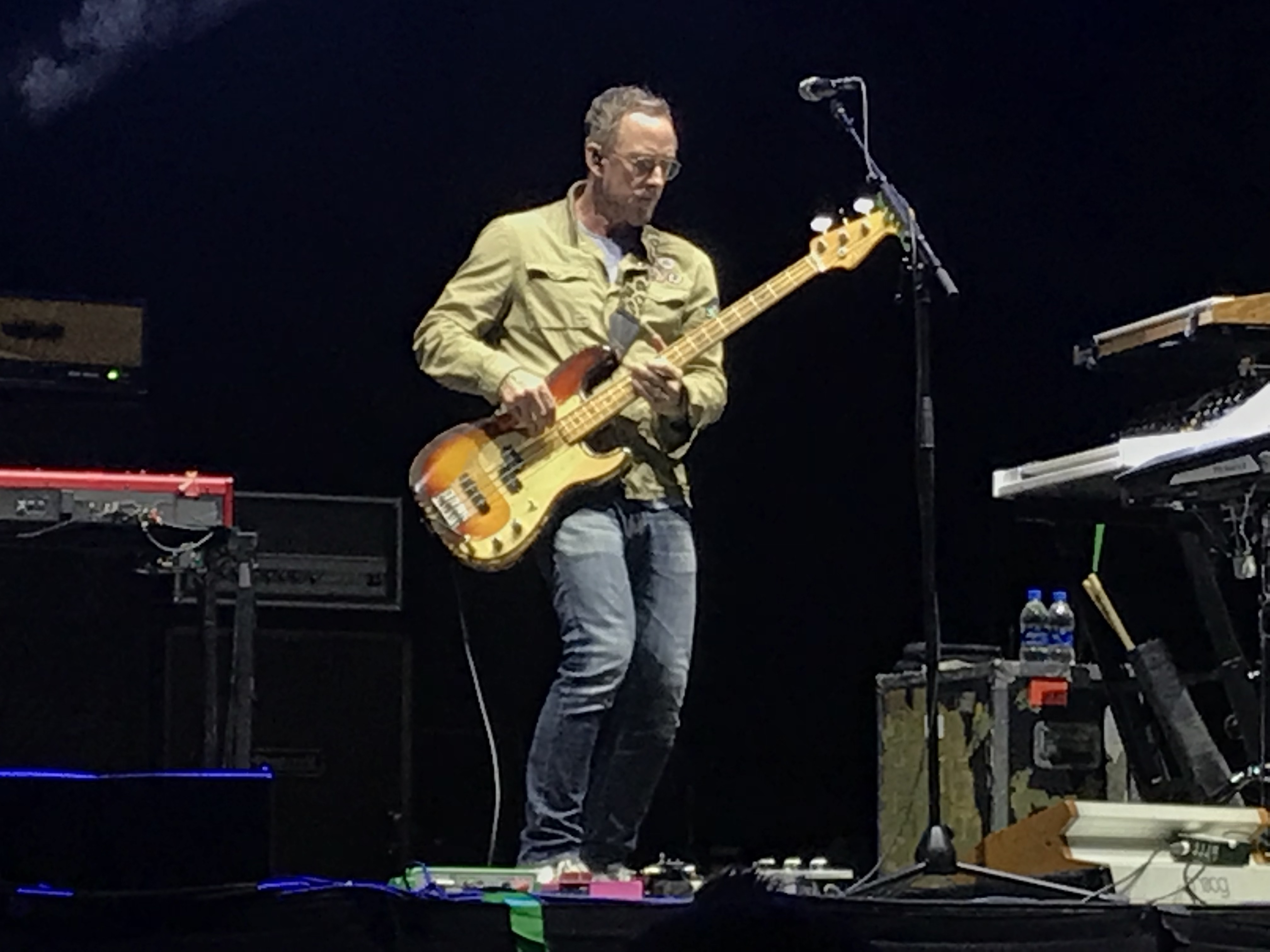
Shriner performing with Weezer at Musikfest in Bethlehem, Pennsylvania in August 2019.

In 2005, he sang lead vocals on Weezer songs "In the Garage," "Dope Nose," and "Fall Together." In 2008, during the band's Hootenanny Tour, he sang lead vocals on a cover of "Creep" by Radiohead. On the band's 2008 Troublemaker Tour, he sang "Perfect Situation" and "My Name is Jonas", which he sings in a three-way lead vocal second, with Patrick Wilson and Rivers Cuomo singing lead vocals first and last respectively. He also played on the band's EP The Lion and the Witch and numerous B-sides and demos which can be found on the internet. He has also played shows with Patrick Wilson's band The Special Goodness.

On April 11, 2018, several days prior to the Cars' performance at their Rock and Roll Hall of Fame induction on April 14, Shriner announced that he would perform with the band. Shriner had previously worked with the Cars leader Ric Ocasek when Ocasek produced the 2014 Weezer album Everything Will Be Alright in the End.

In 2020, Shriner voiced himself in The Simpsons episode "The Hateful Eight-Year-Olds", along with the rest of his Weezer bandmates.

== Side projects ==
He guest-starred with the band the Scrantones at the 2007 The Office convention. During this performance, the band played Radiohead's "Creep" with The Office's Craig Robinson on vocals.

In June 2009, Scott guest-starred with E.J. Wells in a music video of Wells' "There's Something In The Graveyard," which is the first music video ever filmed in the historic Virginia City Cemetery, in Virginia City, Nevada.

== Equipment ==
Shriner's primary bass guitars are his 1960 and 1962 Fender Precision Bass guitars, and an Electrical Guitar Company Custom Bass; he can also be seen playing Lakland and Warwick Thumb, and more recently, a Rickenbacker bass. His rig setup consists of an early 70's Ampeg SVT Head and Mesa Boogie 8x10 and 4x12 cabinets. For distortion, Shriner uses an Electro-Harmonix bass big muff pi. Shriner also uses Shure in-ear monitors.

== Personal life ==
Shriner has a younger sister named Lori. On November 9, 2005, Shriner married author Jillian Lauren in Hawaii. They have two adopted children. They have two dogs, Peanut and Calvin, both of whom appeared in a PETA video encouraging people to adopt from shelters. On April 9, 2025, Lauren was shot by the Los Angeles Police Department (LAPD) and arrested on suspicion of attempted murder. On December 2, 2025, Lauren filed for divorce from Shriner, citing irreconcilable differences as the reason.

== Discography ==
=== With Weezer ===
- Maladroit (2002)
- The Lion and the Witch EP (2002)
- Make Believe (2005)
- Weezer (Red Album) (2008)
- Raditude (2009)
- Hurley (2010)
- Death to False Metal (2010)
- Everything Will Be Alright in the End (2014)
- Weezer (White Album) (2016)
- Pacific Daydream (2017)
- Weezer (Teal Album) (2019)
- Weezer (Black Album) (2019)
- OK Human (2021)
- Van Weezer (2021)
- SZNZ: Spring (2022)
- SZNZ: Summer (2022)
- SZNZ: Autumn (2022)
- SZNZ: Winter (2022)
- Weezer (Gold Album) (2026)

=== Other appearances ===
- Anthony Green's solo debut Avalon (2008)
