= A Little Bit of Love (Weezer song) =

Single by Weezer

from the album SZNZ: Spring
- Released: March 16, 2022
- Genre: Power pop
- Length: 2:44
- Label: Atlantic; Crush
- Songwriters: Rivers Cuomo; Wayne Wilkins; Dave Gibson; Jax
- Producers: Ethan Gruska; Suzy Shinn; Jake Sinclair

Weezer singles chronology
"Tell Me What You Want" (2021)	"A Little Bit of Love" (2022)	"Records" (2022)

Music video
- "A Little Bit of Love" on YouTube

"A Little Bit of Love" is a song by the American rock band Weezer, released on March 16, 2022, as the first single from the first of their 2022 series of four SZNZ albums, SZNZ: Spring. The song made its live debut on March 21, 2022, on Jimmy Kimmel Live!.

== Critical reception ==
A Little Bit of Love was positively received by Izzy Colón of Spin, whom described it as "a light and fresh song that builds anticipation for the rest of the project." Sowing from Sputnikmusic described the song as "a cutely enjoyable little bop that is designed to put a spring in your step more than actually wow you with any sort of songwriting prowess", and opined that the chorus is an "earworm", while comparing the use of the harmonica to that of their 2016 self-titled album. Sowing rated the song 3 out of 5 stars.

== Charts ==
=== Weekly charts ===
Chart performance for "A Little Bit of Love"
Chart (2022)	Peak position
Canada Rock (Billboard)	2
Japan Hot Overseas (Billboard)	19
US Hot Rock & Alternative Songs (Billboard)	28
US Rock & Alternative Airplay (Billboard)	4

=== Year-end charts ===
2022 year-end chart performance for "A Little Bit of Love"
Chart (2022)	Position
US Hot Rock & Alternative Songs (Billboard)	95
US Rock & Alternative Airplay Songs (Billboard)	11
