= Death to False Metal =

Compilation album by Weezer
- Released: November 2, 2010
- Recorded: 1993–2010
- Genres: Alternative rock; power pop
- Length: 32:52
- Label: Geffen
- Producers: Weezer; Rick Rubin; Shawn Everett; Rivers Cuomo

Weezer chronology
Hurley (2010)	Death to False Metal (2010)	Everything Will Be Alright in the End (2014)

Death to False Metal is a compilation album by American rock band Weezer, the final compilation album released on November 2, 2010 by Geffen Records. The album comprises several previously unreleased tracks from throughout Weezer's career, with vocalist and guitarist Rivers Cuomo stating that the songs together make an album that should "logically follow Hurley". The album debuted at number 48 on the US Billboard 200.

The album was released simultaneously with the deluxe edition of the band's second studio album, Pinkerton (1996). The title comes from a phrase coined by Manowar.

== Background and recording ==
Originally known as Odds and Ends, the album was first mentioned by guitarist Brian Bell during the summer of 2008. Vocalist and guitarist Rivers Cuomo states that the tracks are "great songs, great recordings, but for some reason they didn't make the final cut for a record. And like the Alone record, they span a vast period of time from the very beginning of our career in the early '90s right up to the present day."

Frontman Rivers Cuomo considers Death to False Metal to be Weezer's ninth studio album. Band webmaster and historian Karl Koch describes the release differently. He calls it "a special album, [...] sort of like Weezer's version of Rivers' Alone records."

The version of "Mykel & Carli" on the iTunes version of the album differs from the previously released version on the "Undone – The Sweater Song" single in 1994 and later the deluxe edition of the band's self-titled 1994 debut. It has been speculated by fans that it is the original 1993 recording of the song from the Blue Album sessions, with the more common previously released version known to have been recorded in the summer of 1994.

The album's opening track, "Turning Up the Radio", is the product of Rivers Cuomo's YouTube songwriting project Let's Write a Sawng, a process where the frontman curated a 15-step program where people were free to submit ideas such as titles, chord progressions and melodies to create a collaborative song through the video-sharing platform. The resulting song has 17 co-writers and involves tracks recorded across various locations.

On September 25, 2014, it was announced that the album would be available on vinyl for the first time.

The cover art for the album mimics that of a religious tract from Jehovah's Witnesses featuring an artist's impression of a perfect planet Earth.

== Reception ==
Professional ratings
Aggregate scores
Source	Rating
Metacritic	56/100
Review scores
Source	Rating
The A.V. Club	C−
AllMusic	4/5 stars
Billboard	2.5/5 stars
Consequence of Sound	2.5/5 stars
Drowned in Sound	4/10
Filter	69%
Hot Press	4/5 stars
IGN	7.5/10
Pitchfork	3.5/10
Punknews.org	2.5/5 stars

According to the review aggregator Metacritic, Death to False Metal received "mixed or average reviews" based on a weighted average score of 56 out of 100 from 13 critic scores.

AllMusic gave the album 4 out of 5 stars, saying "It's a wonder why a few of these cuts didn't pop up before this, but as a collection of outtakes, they hold together better than some of the band's proper albums." Drowned in Sound gave it a 4 out of 10, calling it "lineage of dumbed down music to even more dumb lyrics", citing songs such as "Blowin' My Stack" and "Trampoline". IGN gave it a 7.5 out of 10, citing "...the album feels a lot more cohesive than similar rarities sets, though a little more diversity would have made for a more interesting listen."

== Track listing ==
All tracks are written by Rivers Cuomo, except where noted.

No.	Title	Writer(s)	Length
1.	"Turning Up the Radio"	Cuomo; Alfredo Robert Carballo; Paul Dutton; Patrick Gannon; Joshua Godinez; Daniel James Kelsch; Reshad Malik; Cameron L. Maris; Sam Mitchell; Taylor Morden; Daniel Powell; Lauren Sonder; Nishant Thakur; Justin Vail; Mike Danger; Kingsly Vanata; Ryan Wiesbrock	3:37
2.	"I Don't Want Your Loving"		3:03
3.	"Blowin' My Stack"	Cuomo; Brian Bell; Scott Shriner	3:44
4.	"Losing My Mind"		4:02
5.	"Everyone"		2:49
6.	"I'm a Robot"		2:31
7.	"Trampoline"		2:45
8.	"The Odd Couple"		3:07
9.	"Autopilot"		2:57
10.	"Unbreak My Heart"	Diane Warren	4:11
Total length:			32:52

International bonus tracks
No.	Title	Writer(s)	Length
11.	"Yellow Camaro"	Bell	1:54
12.	"Outta Here"		2:34

iTunes Store/Vinyl bonus track
No.	Title	Length
13.	"Mykel and Carli"	3:13

- "Unbreak My Heart" is originally performed by Toni Braxton.
- "Yellow Camaro" is a Japanese exclusive track.
- "Mykel and Carli" is a previously unreleased version from the Blue Album's sessions.

== Personnel ==
Personnel taken from Death to False Metal CD booklet.

Weezer

- Brian Bell
- Rivers Cuomo
- Scott Shriner
- Pat Wilson

Additional musicians

- David Campbell – string arrangements, conducting
- Taylor Morden – additional guitar, backing vocals, and synthesizer on "Turning Up the Radio"

Design

- Andy Mueller – art direction
- Robert Pitt – cover painting, paintings
- Daniel Field, Karl Koch, Sean Murphy, Spike Jonze – photography

Production

- Chad Bamford – engineer
- Shawn Everett – engineer, Audio mixing
- Taylor Morden – engineer, producer
- Rich Mouser – engineer
- Rick Rubin – engineer
- Jim Scott – engineer
- Dave Collins– mastering
- Marc McClusky – mixing (tracks: 1 to 3)
