= Records (song) =

Single by Weezer

from the album SZNZ: Summer
- Released: June 16, 2022
- Genre: Alternative rock; power pop
- Length: 3:28
- Label: Atlantic; Crush
- Songwriters: Rivers Cuomo; Sam Hollander; Grant Michaels
- Producer: Daniel Omelio

Weezer singles chronology
"A Little Bit of Love" (2022)	"Records" (2022)	"I Want a Dog" (2022)

Music video
- "Records" on YouTube

"Records" is a song by the American rock band Weezer, released on June 16, 2022, as the first single from the second of their 2022 series of four SZNZ albums, SZNZ: Summer.

== Release ==
"Records" was released as a single on June 16, 2022. The song was initially released via the "Human Record Player," a smartphone app that played the song as one physically spins themself around clockwise, made in collaboration with the Los Angeles–based art studio BRAIN.

The song made its live debut on Jimmy Kimmel Live! on June 20, 2022.

On August 31, 2022, Weezer released a remix of "Records" featuring the rapper Noga Erez.

== Critical reception ==
Rob Wilson at Gigwise described the song as "catchy but undercooked", and stated that it feels out-of-place on the EP "musically and conceptually".

== Charts ==
=== Weekly charts ===
Weekly chart performance for "Records"
Chart (2022–23)	Peak position
Canada Rock (Billboard)	12
US Rock & Alternative Airplay (Billboard)	6

=== Year-end charts ===
Year-end chart performance for "Records"
Chart (2023)	Position
US Rock Airplay (Billboard)	15
