= Christmas with Weezer =

2008 Christmas EP by Weezer

Christmas With Weezer

EP by Weezer
- Released: December 16, 2008
- Genre: Alternative rock; Christmas; power pop
- Length: 13:52
- Label: DGC; Interscope

Weezer chronology
Weezer (2008)	Christmas With Weezer (2008)	Raditude (2009)

Weezer EP chronology
The Lion and the Witch (2002)	Christmas with Weezer (2008)	Raditude ...Happy Record Store Day! (2010)

Professional ratings
Review scores
Source	Rating
AllMusic	3/5 stars

Christmas with Weezer is a Christmas EP by American rock band Weezer released on December 16, 2008.

== Recording and production ==
The six tracks of the Christmas with Weezer EP were originally recorded for the previously released iOS video game Christmas with Weezer. Soon after the release of the iOS game, Weezer went back into the studio and re-recorded the tracks from the game. The band made slight changes to the songs, such as adding backing vocals from lead guitarist Brian Bell.

== Release ==
Christmas with Weezer was released through DGC / Interscope on December 16, 2008. On November 2, 2022, the album had its first physical release on CD in Japan.

== Track listing ==
No.	Title	Writer(s)	Length
1.	"We Wish You a Merry Christmas"	Traditional; arranged by Nick Cannon, Kevin Writer and Doug Holzapfel	1:26
2.	"O Come All Ye Faithful"	Traditional	2:04
3.	"O Holy Night"	Traditional	4:04
4.	"The First Noel"	Traditional	2:22
5.	"Hark! The Herald Angels Sing"	Traditional	1:32
6.	"Silent Night"	Franz Xaver Gruber, Joseph Mohr	2:22
Total length:			13:52

Note

- Credits taken from the CD booklet.

== Charts ==
Chart (2009)	Peak position
US Billboard 200	173
US Top Holiday Albums (Billboard)	15
