= Hurley (album) =

Studio album by Weezer
- Released: September 10, 2010
- Recorded: July–August 2010
- Genres: Alternative rock; power pop; pop rock
- Length: 34:16
- Label: Epitaph
- Producers: Rivers Cuomo; Shawn Everett

Weezer chronology
Raditude (2009)	Hurley (2010)	Death to False Metal (2010)

Singles from Hurley
- 1. "Memories" Released: August 10, 2010; 2. "Hang On" Released: February 15, 2011

Hurley is the eighth studio album by American rock band Weezer, released on September 10, 2010. It is Weezer's only album released by Epitaph Records. The album was produced by Rivers Cuomo and Shawn Everett. Similar to their previous album Raditude, Hurley features songs co-written with songwriters outside of the band.

Preceded by the single "Memories", Hurley debuted at number six on the US Billboard 200, with over 45,000 units sold in its first week of sales.

== Background ==
In late 2009, Weezer revealed the group's seventh album, Raditude. Compared to the band's other albums, it received a lukewarm response. In December, it was revealed that the band was no longer signed to Geffen Records. The band members stated that new material would still be released, but were unsure of the means, whether it be self-released, released online, or released via another label. Eventually, the band was signed to the independent label Epitaph.

== Composition ==
Critics have labeled the album as alternative rock, power pop, and pop rock.

== Music and lyrics ==
In July 2010, Weezer began recording the follow-up to Raditude. Frontman Rivers Cuomo said of the album, "There's definitely going to be more raw rock energy on this one." In August 2010, the track list was revealed.

The first track and single from the album was "Memories", also featured in a Guitar Hero track pack alongside "Buddy Holly" and "(If You're Wondering If I Want You To) I Want You To", released simultaneously with the album on September 14. The second single released was "Hang On" on February 15 to U.S. Alternative radio.

The music video for "Memories" also features members of Jackass on backing vocals, and clips from the then-upcoming film Jackass 3-D. AP magazine described the high-energy track as "Andrew W.K. covering The Killers."

The string tracks in "Memories" and "Unspoken", as well as in bonus tracks "All My Friends Are Insects" and "Represent", were recorded at the Banff Centre in Banff, Alberta, Canada.

"Hang On", co-written by Rick Nowels, features Canadian actor Michael Cera on backing vocals and mandolin.

The album's closer, "Time Flies", co-written by country singer and songwriter Mac Davis, features a lo-fi, folk-country sound, while also being compared to the music of Led Zeppelin.

Of the album's ten songs, only four have been performed live: "Memories", "Ruling Me", "Unspoken" and "Where's My Sex?".

== Artwork and title ==
The album's cover is a picture of a CD Jewel case with a photo of American actor Jorge Garcia, who portrayed Hugo "Hurley" Reyes on the television series Lost from 2004 to 2010. The photo itself is a small cropping of an original picture of Cuomo being embraced by Garcia, taken in the green room of Lopez Tonight while Weezer and Garcia were taping segments for separate shows on the same day.

Originally, the band was going to self-title the album for a fourth time, but decided against it, since the band figured most fans would simply refer to the album as the "Hurley" album. Guitarist Brian Bell stated that the record was named after clothing company Hurley International, whose bosses he said funded the recording and provided a studio for recording sessions. Bell later claimed that he was mistaken and that the album was in fact named after the Lost character and not the clothing company. However, the group subsequently worked with the clothing manufacturer to create a Weezer-branded clothing line.

== Promotion ==
Weezer used internet streaming service YouTube as a way to promote the album. Weezer loaned itself to 15 amateur online video producers, "going along with whatever plans the creator could execute in about 30 minutes." The band used many of the popular channels to promote themselves, such as Barely Political, Tay Zonday, Dave Days, Magic Hugs, Fred Figglehorn, Ray William Johnson, and Annoying Orange. The Gregory Brothers solicited musical and vocal contributions from the band on one of its signature topical compositions—built around melodically enhanced speeches by Representative Charles Rangel and President Obama. Weezer called the promotion "The YouTube Invasion".

== Critical reception ==
Professional ratings
Aggregate scores
Source	Rating
AnyDecentMusic?	5.9/10
Metacritic	68/100
Review scores
Source	Rating
AllMusic	3.5/5 stars
Alternative Press	4/5 stars
The A.V. Club	B−
Billboard	3.5/5 stars
Entertainment Weekly	A−
The Guardian	2/5 stars
NME	8/10
Pitchfork	5.0/10
Rolling Stone	3/5 stars
Spin	7/10

According to the review aggregator Metacritic, Hurley received "generally favorable reviews" based on a weighted average score of 68 out of 100 from 28 critic scores. After the album was leaked to the internet, Weezer made it available for free streaming on the band's MySpace page. Many music sites and magazines used this as an opportunity to review the album before it was tangibly released to the public.

Michael Roffman of Consequence of Sound wrote "From the get-go, Hurley feels more personal and at heart than anything on Raditude". NME's Rob Parker comments "...it’s got the charm and spark of the Weezer of old, and that’s a quality you just can’t fake." The New York Times writer Jon Caramanica regards it as "the group’s strongest album in recent years." Adam Thomas at Sputnikmusic considered it an improvement over the band's previous three albums, saying "Hurley proves that Rivers still has some gas left in the tank." Jeff Jensen of Entertainment Weekly regarded it as a "...terrific rebound, a blast of sonic sweetness that finds the band integrating '60s pop influences". At AllMusic, Stephen Thomas Erlewine noted "Sometimes, the quirks become overwhelming...but usually the melodies and riffs are clean, simple, and powerful, hooking immediately and sticking around for a while.

Many critics favorably compared the songs on Hurley to the songs from Weezer's first three albums. Scott Heisel at Alternative Press and Ben Patashnik of Rock Sound compared the song "Ruling Me" to the songs from the band's self-titled debut and second self-titled album. Alternative Press said that the song "is a distant cousin of both the Blue Album's "No One Else" and the Green Album's "Don't Let Go", serving as a straight-ahead slab of power-pop." Rock Sound said that "The chugging guitars of the verse [of "Ruling Me"] hearken back to Green-era Weezer, which is all very pleasant, but it's the chorus that rockets "Ruling Me" into a different league." Rolling Stone's Jon Dolan called the song "Where's My Sex" "Pinkerton-esque".

=== Accolades ===
Publication	Country	Accolade	Year	Rank
Drowned in Sound	UK	Albums of the Year	2010	13

== Commercial performance ==
Hurley debuted at number six on the Billboard 200 with 45,000 units sold, making it Weezer's sixth top 10 album, as well as the band's sixth top 10 album in a row. Despite peaking higher than Raditude, Hurley sold 21,000 fewer units in its first week than the former. During its second week of release, the album fell to number 24, selling 11,235 copies.

== Track listing ==
Standard edition
No.	Title	Writer(s)	Length
1.	"Memories"	Rivers Cuomo	3:16
2.	"Ruling Me"	Cuomo; Dan Wilson	3:30
3.	"Trainwrecks"	Cuomo; Desmond Child	3:21
4.	"Unspoken"	Cuomo	3:01
5.	"Where's My Sex?"	Cuomo; Greg Wells	3:28
6.	"Run Away"	Cuomo; Ryan Adams	2:55
7.	"Hang On"	Cuomo; Rick Nowels	3:33
8.	"Smart Girls"	Cuomo; Tony Kanal; Jimmy Harry	3:11
9.	"Brave New World"	Cuomo; Linda Perry	3:57
10.	"Time Flies"	Cuomo; Mac Davis	3:42

UK + Deluxe edition bonus tracks
No.	Title	Writer(s)	Length
11.	"All My Friends Are Insects"	Adam Deibert	1:53
12.	"Viva la Vida" (Coldplay cover)	Guy Berryman; Jonny Buckland; Will Champion; Chris Martin	4:06
13.	"I Want to Be Something"	Cuomo	2:56
14.	"Represent" (Rocked Out mix)	Cuomo; Nowels	4:13

Japanese edition bonus tracks
No.	Title	Writer(s)	Length
15.	"Unspoken" (Sam Farrar remix)	Cuomo	3:09
16.	"Memories" (instrumental)	Cuomo	3:15

== Personnel ==
Personnel taken from Hurley CD booklet.

Weezer

- Brian Bell
- Rivers Cuomo
- Scott Shriner
- Patrick Wilson

Additional musicians

- Johnny Knoxville, Wee Man, Ryan Dunn, Dave England, Preston Lacy, April Margera, Ehren McGhehey, Steve-O – gang vocals on "Memories"
- Chris Pontius – gang vocals and additional guitar on "Memories"
- Dan Wilson – additional background vocals on "Ruling Me"
- Alex Greenwald – orchestration on "Trainwrecks"
- Desmond Child – piano on "Trainwrecks"
- Blake Mills – keyboard on "Trainwrecks"
- Avram Sills – percussion on "Unspoken"
- Greg Vail – flute on "Unspoken"
- Ryan Adams – guitar and bass on "Run Away"
- Tony Berg – hurdy-gurdy on "Hang On"
- Michael Cera – mandolin and background vocals on "Hang On"
- Jimmy Harry – additional guitar on "Smart Girls"

Design

- Andy Mueller – art direction and design
- Daniel Field – cover photography
- Danny Clinch – band photograph

Strings

- Tyler Fitzmaurice, Allegra Young – string arrangements, conductor
- Simon Gamache, Florian Krentz – orchestration
- Theresa Leonard – string engineer, percussion, production coordinator
- Florian Krentz, Sergey Martynyuk – production assistants
- Noland Bouvier, Gonzalo Garcia, Jim Hewins, Pattie Phillips, Shelley Uprichard – string engineers
- John Batchelder, Carrie Campbell, Cat Gray, Kellen McDaniel, Kayleigh "Kmizzle" Miller, Brian Sherwood – viola
- Emily Botel, Yoon-Kyung "YK" Shin, Maria Van der Sloot, Jeremy Van Sylke, Allegra Young – violin
- Devin Franco, Gabrielle Hamann-Guennette, Cecilia Huerta – cello
- Travis Harrison – octa bass

Production

- Shawn Everett – producer, engineer, mixing (tracks 1, 6, 8, 10, 11, 14)
- Rivers Cuomo – producer
- Todd Bergman – assistant engineer
- Eric Steinman – assistant engineer
- Chesare Marolo – assistant engineer
- James Musshom – assistant engineer
- Cameron Webb – additional recording on "Where's My Sex?"
- Marc McClusky – mixing (tracks 2, 3, 5, 7, 9)
- John Goodmanson – mixing (track 4)
- Dave Collins – mastering

== Charts ==
Chart (2010)	Peak position
Australian Albums (ARIA)	55
Belgian Albums (Ultratop Wallonia)	93
Canadian Albums (Billboard)	11
Dutch Albums (Album Top 100)	98
French Albums (SNEP)	131
German Albums (Offizielle Top 100)	63
Irish Albums (IRMA)	64
Japanese Albums (Oricon)	24
New Zealand Albums (RMNZ)	34
Norwegian Albums (VG-lista)	29
Scottish Albums (Official Charts)	50
Swiss Albums (Schweizer Hitparade)	87
UK Albums (Official Charts)	49
UK Album Downloads (Official Charts)	44
UK Independent Albums (Official Charts)	6
US Billboard 200	6
US Independent Albums (Billboard)	1
US Top Rock Albums (Billboard)	3
