= Patrick Wilson (drummer) =

American rock drummer

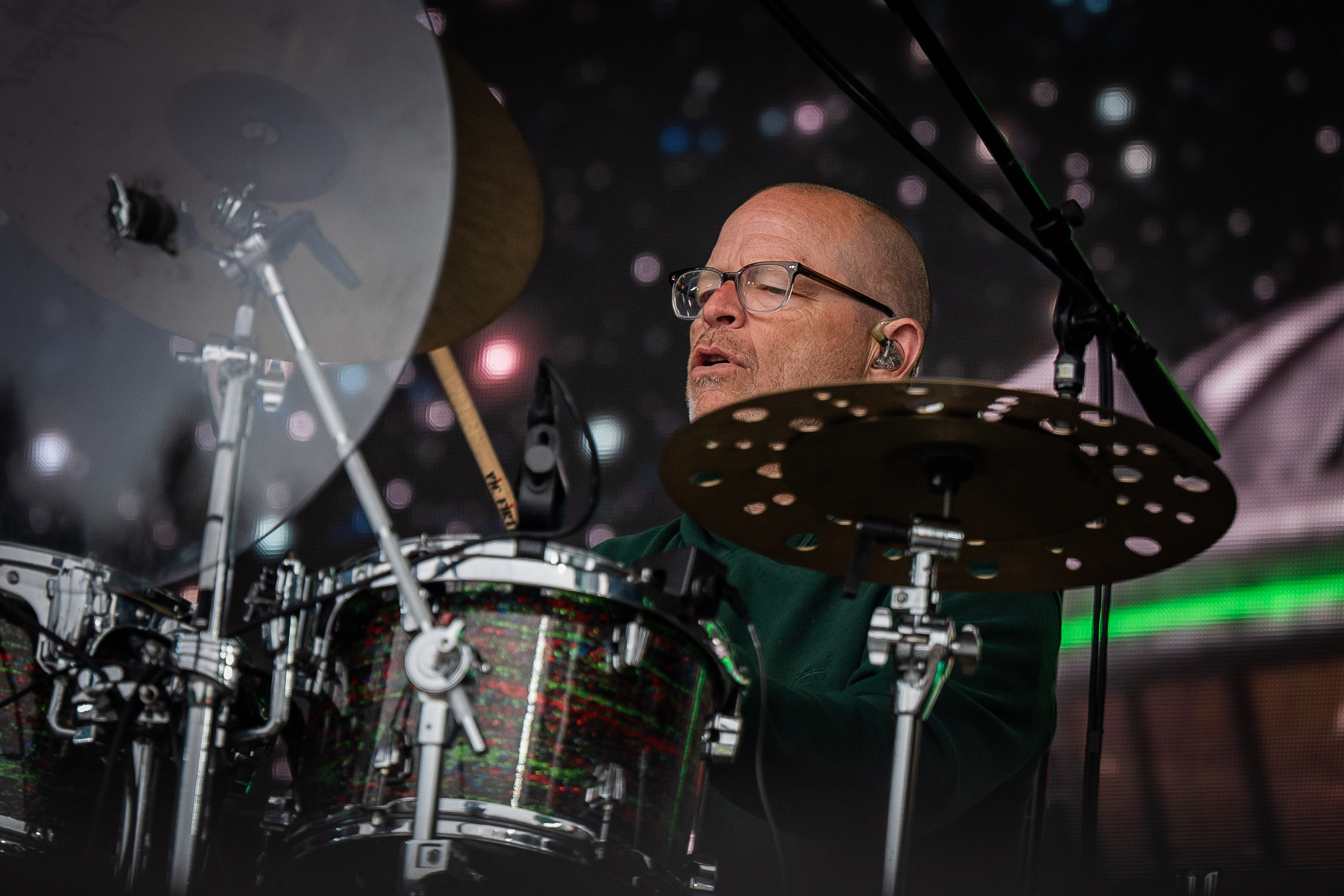
- Wilson with Weezer at the Tons of Rock festival in Norway, 2025

Background information
- Born: Patrick George Wilson; February 1, 1969 (age 57); Buffalo, New York, U.S.
- Genres: Alternative rock; power pop; pop rock; pop-punk; geek rock; emo
- Occupations: Musician; singer; songwriter
- Instruments: Drums; percussion; vocals; guitar; bass; keyboards
- Years active: 1982–present
- Labels: Geffen; Epitaph
- Member of: Weezer; The Special Goodness
- Formerly of: The Rentals
- Spouses: Jennifer Wilson (m. 1994; died 2013) Camille Wilson (m. 2015)

Patrick George Wilson (born February 1, 1969) is an American musician, singer and songwriter. He is best known as a co-founding member and the drummer of the rock band Weezer, with whom he has recorded twenty studio albums.

In addition to his work with Weezer, Wilson also fronts his own band, the Special Goodness.

== Career ==
=== Early life ===
Patrick Wilson was born in Buffalo, New York, on February 1, 1969, and raised in nearby Clarence. He was introduced to music very early, making his first musical purchase of Barry Manilow's 1976 album This One's for You. Shortly after his 15th birthday, he attended his first concert, seeing Van Halen. As a result, he was inspired to start taking drum lessons. By his senior year at Clarence High School, Wilson and his friend Greg Czarnecki began teaching the instrument, eventually attracting more than 30 students.

After graduating from high school in 1987, Wilson attended a local college briefly, withdrawing after one semester. He commented, "College is such bunk. Too much politics and jockeying for favor. I just couldn't do it. College is great if you want to learn, but that's not what college is about, it's about making your professor happy and getting good grades and getting into IBM. Any place that says that they're only accepting college graduates is not a place I'm very interested in being."

Growing tired of the local music scene, and at the urging of friend Patrick Finn, Wilson moved to Los Angeles at the age of 21. Shortly after arriving in Los Angeles, Wilson joined a short-lived band called Bush in which he met friend and future Weezer bassist Matt Sharp.

Wilson was also in another band with future Weezer frontman Rivers Cuomo called Fuzz that dissolved within three months. Wilson said: "By the time I had met Matt Sharp, and we were trying to figure out something to do. We had a lot of passion and interested in certain kinds of music, but we didn't know how that was going to translate into what we were going to do. So we met Rivers – 'He's got an 8-track, let's get with him' – and we convinced him to move into this apartment with us. Rivers was just starting to write songs and he asked me to play drums on a song for him. That turned into a band called Fuzz, with this girl bass player. That was pretty cool, but it had to die."

In the spring of 1991, Sharp moved north to Berkeley to pursue what Karl Koch called "some sorta symphonic keyboard sequencing music." Other members of the band moved to separate apartments. During this time, Wilson performed in a number of different bands such as the Dum Dums and United Dirt. Cuomo, Wilson and Cropper reunited in a band called Sixty Wrong Sausages with Patrick Finn. Later, after Sixty Wrong Sausages dissolved in late 1991, Sharp replaced Finn. During this time, Wilson and Cuomo embarked on a "50-song project" in which they would dedicate themselves to writing 50 new songs. Out of this project, future Weezer songs were created, such as "Undone—The Sweater Song", "My Name Is Jonas", "Lullaby for Wayne" and "The World Has Turned and Left Me Here."

In January 1992, Sharp reconnected with former bandmates Cuomo, Wilson and Cropper, and Wilson showed him material from his and Cuomo's "50-song project." Sharp was pleased with the material and returned to Los Angeles to join the band, consisting of Cuomo, Wilson, and Cropper, now under the name of Weezer.

=== With Weezer ===
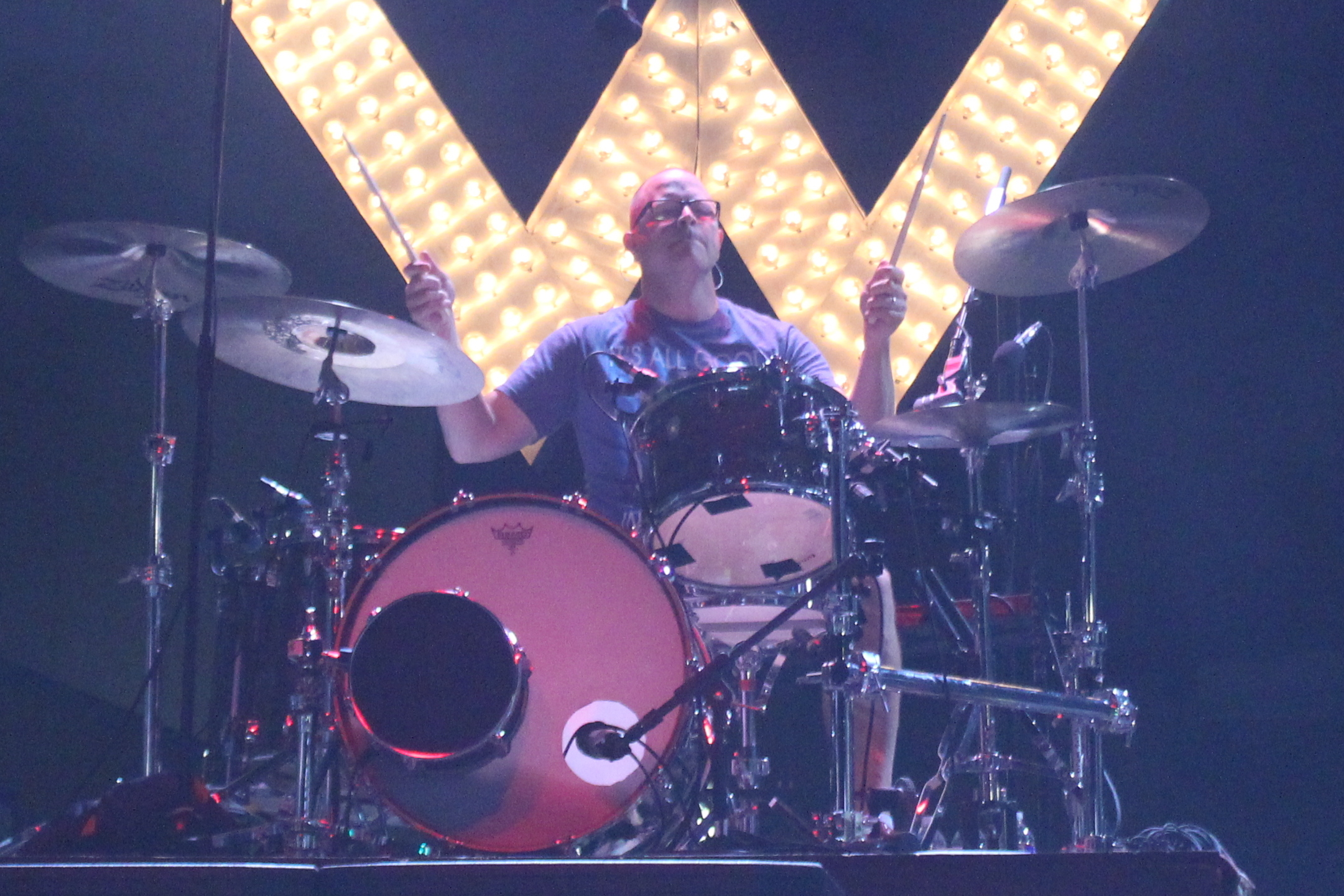
Wilson performing with Weezer in 2015

In addition to his drum duties, Wilson has three cowriting credits for Weezer songs ("The World Has Turned and Left Me Here", "Surf Wax America" and "My Name Is Jonas") and three solo writing credits ("Automatic", "In the Mall", and "Shine Again", where he also provides guitars and background vocals.). He also has lead vocal/lead guitar duties on "Automatic". However, Cuomo and Wilson have written many more songs collaboratively, including "Lemonade" (released on Alone: The Home Recordings of Rivers Cuomo) and "Lullaby for Wayne" (released on the deluxe version of 1994's Weezer).

Wilson's stunts on skateboards, scooters and bicycles have been videotaped and released on Weezer's official website. Some of these videos can be seen on Weezer's DVD Video Capture Device, released in 2004. Wilson plays acoustic guitar for some songs on tour, and in 2005 on tour with Foo Fighters, he played lead guitar and sang "Photograph", which he would follow with a cover of Blur's "Song 2".

Wilson wrote and performed lead vocals/guitars on "Automatic" on Weezer's third self-titled album. The song was remixed by LA Riots for the video game Gran Turismo 5 Prologue. Wilson also sang lead vocals on the album's B-side covers of "Life's What You Make It" (Talk Talk) and "Love My Way" (the Psychedelic Furs). He also contributed vocals to Weezer's cover of Tubeway Army's "Are 'Friends' Electric?", which he had sung live with Weezer in 2005.

During Weezer's 2008 Troublemaker tour, Wilson played drums and sang in a three-part lead vocal with Scott Shriner and Cuomo on "My Name Is Jonas"; sang lead vocals and played lead guitar on "Automatic" and covers of Nirvana's "Sliver," Oasis's "Morning Glory" and Pink Floyd's "Time"; and played drums and sang backup vocals on "The Greatest Man That Ever Lived".

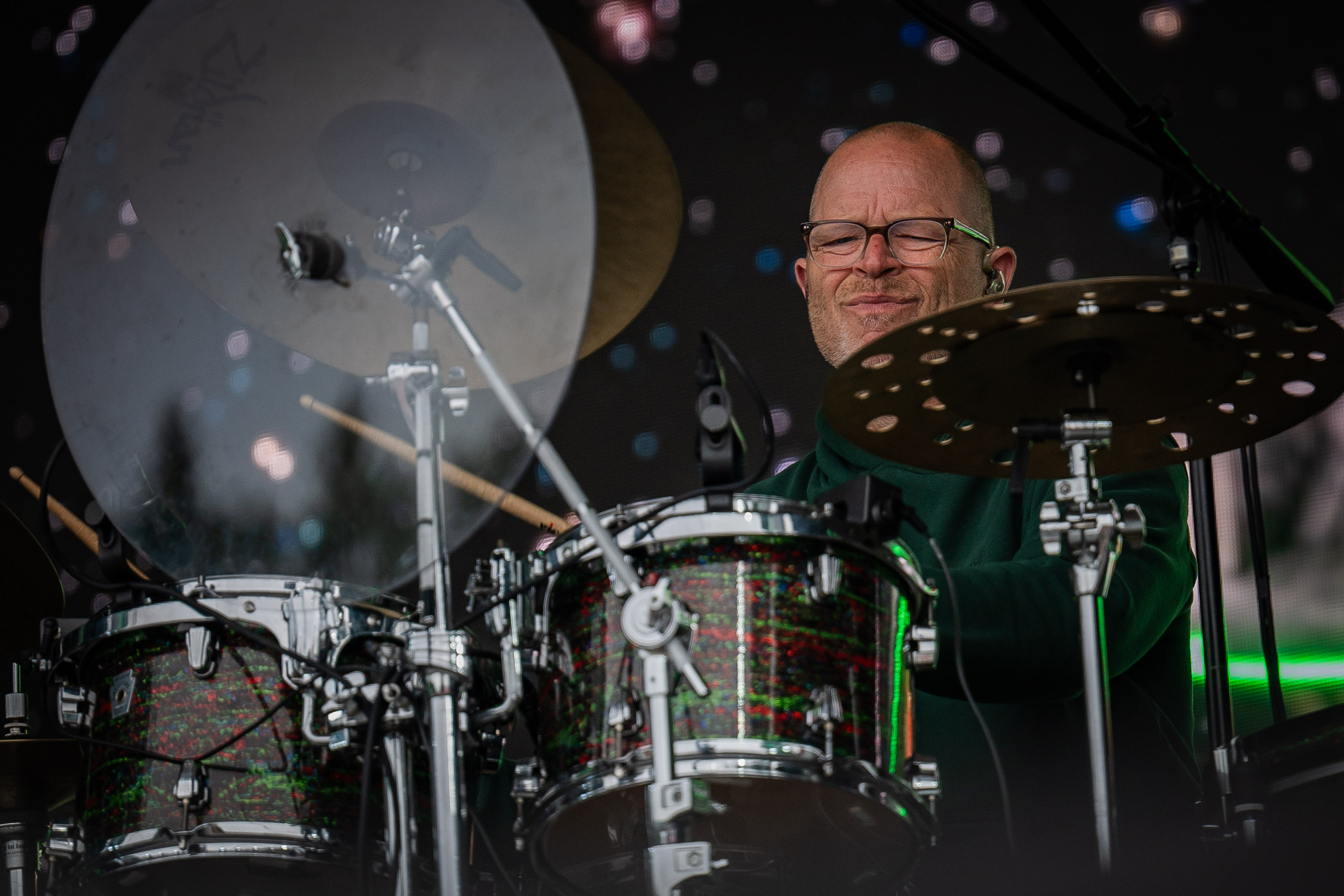
Wilson performing with Weezer in 2025

During Weezer's 2009 tour supporting Blink 182, Josh Freese played drums for Weezer while Wilson played guitar for the majority of their set, necessitated by Cuomo's desire to be more interactive and mobile on stage and less involved with guitar work.

On April 1, 2026, Weezer released the lead single "Shine Again" from the latest self-titled album. It is the first Weezer single to be written solely by Wilson. Wilson also wrote tracks from the album with Rivers Cuomo, the first time the two have co-wrote songs on a Weezer album since their 1994 debut.

=== Other projects ===
Wilson records and performs with his own band, the Special Goodness, for which he writes songs, performs vocals and plays the majority of the instruments. The band has released several albums, and Wilson has made songs available on his website.

Almost immediately after Weezer's initial success, Wilson played drums on the Rentals' first record Return of the Rentals, but he never toured with the band.

Wilson and Weezer guitarist Brian Bell collaborated on a cover of the Velvet Underground song "Heroin" for the 2006 film Factory Girl. Additionally, Wilson and Bell were given small roles in the film as John Cale and Lou Reed, respectively.

He also participated in Episode 82 of the MacBreak Weekly podcast.

== Discography ==
=== With Weezer ===
- 1994 – Weezer (Blue Album)
- 1996 – Pinkerton
- 2001 – Weezer (Green Album)
- 2002 – Maladroit
- 2005 – Make Believe
- 2008 – Weezer (Red Album)
- 2009 – Raditude
- 2010 – Hurley
- 2010 – Death to False Metal
- 2014 – Everything Will Be Alright in the End
- 2016 – Weezer (White Album)
- 2017 – Pacific Daydream
- 2019 – Weezer (Teal Album)
- 2019 – Weezer (Black Album)
- 2021 – OK Human
- 2021 – Van Weezer
- 2022 - SZNZ: Spring
- 2022 - SZNZ: Summer
- 2022 - SZNZ: Autumn
- 2022 - SZNZ: Winter
- 2026 - Weezer (Gold Album)

=== With the Special Goodness ===
- 1998 – Special Goodness (a.k.a. "The Bunny Record")
- 2001 – At Some Point, Birds and Flowers Became Interesting (a.k.a. "Pinecone")
- 2003 – Land Air Sea
- 2012 – Natural

=== With the Rentals ===
- 1995 – Return of the Rentals

=== With Rivers Cuomo ===
- 2007 – Alone: The Home Recordings of Rivers Cuomo (cowrote and plays drums on "Lemonade")

=== With Homie ===
- 1998 – Meet the Deedles soundtrack (plays drums on "American Girls")

Wilson has also sung background vocals on Rancid's album Let the Dominoes Fall.
