= SZNZ: Autumn =

Studio album by Weezer
- Released: September 22, 2022
- Studios: EastWest (Hollywood); 4th Street (Santa Monica); JC (Hawaii); United Recording (Los Angeles)
- Genres: Dance-rock; power pop
- Length: 24:16
- Labels: Atlantic; Crush
- Producers: Daniel Omelio; Suzy Shinn; Tyler Cole

Weezer chronology
SZNZ: Summer (2022)	SZNZ: Autumn (2022)	SZNZ: Winter (2022)

SZNZ: Autumn is the eighteenth studio album by American rock band Weezer, and the third of four albums in their SZNZ (pronounced "seasons") project, originally designated as EPs. It was released digitally on September 22, 2022, coinciding with the September equinox. Weezer played one of the songs from the album, "What Happens After You?", on Jimmy Kimmel Live! the day before its release.

== Background ==
According to Rivers Cuomo, the record’s sound would reflect 'dance-rock' artists such as Franz Ferdinand and The Strokes. He also mentioned the EP would include synths.

Cuomo described the project's overall emotion as anxiety.

The album's thematic and aesthetic location was described as being set in "The Mount of Beatitudes", with its associated era being passion and the last supper, along with the Salem Witch Trials.

== Release ==
Unlike the other SZNZ releases, Autumn did not have a lead single. Weezer officially released SZNZ: Autumn on September 22, 2022, the day of the autumnal equinox.

A music video for "What Happens After You?" was released on November 29, 2022.

== Critical reception ==
Professional ratings
Review scores
Source	Rating
Exclaim!	3/10
Gigwise	9/10 stars
Riff Magazine	8/10
Spectrum Culture	51%

Rob Wilson at Gigwise described the album as "an invigorating, emotionally potent update to Weezer's catalogue." Alex Hudson from Exclaim! was much more critical of the album, saying "Every musical idea on Autumn is so flimsy that Weezer quickly abandon it and senselessly move onto the next part without the slightest regard for quality, tempo, aesthetic or mood," while regarding "Should She Stay or Should She Go" as the only good song from it.

== Track listing ==
All tracks are written by Rivers Cuomo, except "What Happens After You?", written by Cuomo, Desmond Child, Eric Bazilian, Rob Wells and Anthony De La Torre.

No.	Title	Length
1.	"Can't Dance, Don't Ask Me"	3:02
2.	"Get Off on the Pain"	3:32
3.	"What Happens After You?"	3:20
4.	"Francesca"	3:28
5.	"Should She Stay or Should She Go"	3:36
6.	"Tastes Like Pain"	2:03
7.	"Run, Raven, Run"	5:15
Total length:		24:16

Vinyl-exclusive bonus track
No.	Title	Length
6.	"The Way I Hate You Now (Note: The vinyl version puts track 6 "Tastes Like Pain" and subsequently track 7 "Run, Raven, Run" as track 7 and track 8 respectively on the tracklist.)"	3:35

== Personnel ==
Personnel taken from SZNZ: Autumn liner notes.

Weezer

- Brian Bell
- Rivers Cuomo
- Scott Shriner
- Patrick Wilson

Additional performers

- Suzy Shinn – vocals on "Can't Dance, Don't Ask Me", programming on "What Happens After You" and "Run, Raven, Run"
- Zac Carper – vocals on "Can't Dance, Don't Ask Me"
- Ryan Baxley – vocals on "Can't Dance, Don't Ask Me"
- Alice Baxley – vocals on "Can't Dance, Don't Ask Me"
- RJ Word – synth programming on "Should She Stay Or Should She Go"
- Aaron Shaw – saxophone on "Should She Stay Or Should She Go"
- Ivan Wayman – keyboard programming on "Run, Raven, Run"

Production

- Robopop – production
- Tyler Cole – production
- Suzy Shinn – production, engineering
- RJ Word – engineering
- Charlie Brand – vocal engineer
- Ben O'Neill – drum engineer
- Ivan Wayman – engineering on "Run, Raven, Run"
- Keoni TeTawa Bowthorpe – assistant engineer on "Can't Dance, Don't Ask Me"
- Chris Dugan – mixing
- Mike Fasano – drum tech
- Bernie Grundman – mastering
- Tension Division – art direction, design

== Charts ==
Chart performance for SZNZ: Autumn
Chart (2023)	Peak position
Hungarian Physical Albums (MAHASZ)	18
UK Album Downloads (Official Charts)	48
