= SZNZ: Spring =

Studio album by Weezer
- Released: March 20, 2022
- Studios: United Recording (Los Angeles); The Village (Los Angeles); 4th Street (Santa Monica)
- Genres: Pop rock; folk rock; folk pop; power pop
- Length: 20:51
- Labels: Atlantic; Crush
- Producers: Ethan Gruska; Suzy Shinn; Jake Sinclair

Weezer chronology
Van Weezer (2021)	SZNZ: Spring (2022)	SZNZ: Summer (2022)

Singles from SZNZ: Spring
- 1. "A Little Bit of Love" Released: March 16, 2022

SZNZ: Spring is the sixteenth studio album by American rock band Weezer, and the first of four albums in their SZNZ (pronounced "seasons") project, originally designated as EPs. It was released digitally on March 20, 2022, coinciding with the spring equinox. A physical version was released on CD later the same year, with a vinyl release in early 2023. The album produced one single, titled "A Little Bit of Love".

SZNZ: Spring was produced by Ethan Gruska, Jake Sinclair and Suzy Shinn. With Sinclair and Shinn having both worked with the band on Weezer (White Album) (2016) and OK Human (2020).

== Background ==
The SZNZ concept was first revealed by Rivers Cuomo in an interview in January 2021. Cuomo stated that he wanted the Spring album to feature a "happy, chill, stress-free" theme, later expressing a desire for an "acoustic, breezy" song in a similar vein to "Island in the Sun".

On February 2, 2022, Cuomo shared a Google spreadsheet with fans which included the release dates, possible producers, overall emotion, spirituality tone, planned genre, and planned singles for each of the SZNZ EPs. Spring's emotion was set to be optimistic sorrow. The spreadsheet also included the band's look and the aesthetic era the clothes and EP are based on. Aesthetically, the band linked SZNZ: Spring to a pre-Christian era with influences from Celts, Paganism, and Wicca.

== Release ==
On March 16, 2022, Weezer released the lead single, "A Little Bit of Love". On March 16, Cuomo used his game, Weezle (a Weezer-themed spin on the popular web game Wordle), to preview snippets of the forthcoming Spring songs.

SZNZ: Spring was officially released on March 20, 2022, the day of the Spring Equinox.

== Critical reception ==
Professional ratings
Aggregate scores
Source	Rating
AnyDecentMusic?	5.7/10
Metacritic	63/100
Review scores
Source	Rating
AllMusic	4/5 stars
The A.V. Club	B−
Exclaim!	5/10
Gigwise	7/10
Northern Transmissions	7/10
Pitchfork	4.4/10
Riff Magazine	6/10
Rolling Stone	3/5 stars
Spectrum Culture	48%
Under the Radar	5/10 stars

According to the review aggregator Metacritic, SZNZ: Spring received "generally favorable reviews" based on a weighted average score of 63 out of 100 from 7 critic scores. In a mixed review, Alex Hudson at Exclaim! stated that, while not the worst Weezer album, "it's frustrating to hear them sabotaging their own songs in a futile attempt to pin down the sound of a season. So far, SZNZ feels less like a lofty concept and more like silly gimmick." Brady Gerber of Pitchfork was more critical, opining "unlike the expensive-sounding and often pretty OK Human—and a rarity for any proper Weezer release—SZNZ sounds cheap." However, Gerber considered the tracks "A Little Bit of Love" and "Wild at Heart" highlights of the album.

== Track listing ==
All tracks are written by Rivers Cuomo, except where noted.

No.	Title	Writer(s)	Length
1.	"Opening Night"		2:27
2.	"Angels on Vacation"		3:25
3.	"A Little Bit of Love"	Cuomo; Wayne Wilkins; Dave Gibson; Jax	2:44
4.	"The Garden of Eden"		3:15
5.	"The Sound of Drums"		3:16
6.	"All This Love"	Cuomo; Patrick Wilson	2:50
7.	"Wild at Heart"		2:54
Total length:			20:51

Vinyl-exclusive bonus track
No.	Title	Length
7.	"Across the Meadow"	2:59

Notes

- "The Sound of Drums" contains portions of the poems, "Back to the River" by Abigail Spinner McBride, and "Air I Am" by Andras Corban-Arthen.
- The vinyl version puts track 7 "Wild at Heart" as track 8, and "Across the Meadow" as track 7 on the tracklist.

== Personnel ==
Weezer

- Brian Bell
- Rivers Cuomo
- Scott Shriner
- Patrick Wilson

Technical

- Ethan Gruska – production
- Suzy Shinn – production
- Jake Sinclair – production
- Rachel White – engineering
- Rouble Kapoor – engineering
- JC LeResche – engineering
- Jason Hiller – engineering
- Sejo Navajas – engineering assistance
- John Sinclair – mixing (all except "A Little Bit of Love")
- Rob Kinelski – mixing on "A Little Bit of Love"
- Eli Heisler – mix assistance on "A Little Bit of Love"
- Bernie Grundman – mastering
- Tension Division – art direction, design

== Charts ==
Chart performance for SZNZ: Spring
Chart (2022)	Peak position
UK Album Downloads (Official Charts)	37
US Top Current Album Sales (Billboard)	86
