= SZNZ: Winter =

Studio album by Weezer
- Released: December 21, 2022
- Studios: Groove Masters (Santa Monica); The Village Recorders (Los Angeles); Funkhaus Berlin
- Genres: Power pop; pop rock
- Length: 21:35
- Labels: Atlantic; Crush
- Producers: Suzy Shinn; James Flannigan; Rivers Cuomo

Weezer chronology
SZNZ: Autumn (2022)	SZNZ: Winter (2022)	Weezer (2026)

Singles from SZNZ: Winter
- 1. "I Want a Dog" Released: December 9, 2022

SZNZ: Winter is the nineteenth studio album by American rock band Weezer, and the last of four albums in their SZNZ (pronounced "seasons") project, originally designated as EPs. It was released digitally on December 21, 2022, coinciding with the December solstice. It spawned a single, "I Want a Dog", released on December 9, 2022.

== Background ==
Rivers Cuomo described the project's overall emotion as sadness. Cuomo said that the songwriting would be stylistically similar to Elliott Smith featuring "lots of loss and despair".

Weezer, under their Goat Punishment pseudonym, performed SZNZ: Winter in its entirety at The Troubadour in West Hollywood, California on September 19, 2022.

== Release ==
The lead single, "I Want a Dog", was released on December 9, 2022, with a live performance of the song on Jimmy Kimmel Live! on December 16, 2022.

SZNZ: Winter officially released on December 21, 2022, alongside a video for "Dark Enough to See the Stars".

== Critical reception ==
Professional ratings
Review scores
Source	Rating
Blabbermouth.net	8/10
Exclaim!	6/10
Gigwise	8/10 stars
Riff Magazine	7/10
Spectrum Culture	48%
Under the Radar	4.5/10 stars

Anne Erikson at Blabbermouth.net opined that the album "proves" that Weezer "can still churn out music that's as strong as their mid-1990s debut." However, Michelle Dalarossa from Under the Radar was more critical of the album, stating "Unfortunately, the combination of Christmas kitsch and Weezer kitsch makes for a grating mishmash of tackiness, angst, and blown-out fuzz that ultimately falls flat." Nonetheless, Dalarossa notes instances of "knack for ear worm vocal melodies and exhilarating power-pop guitar riffs glimmer."

== Track listing ==
All tracks are written by Rivers Cuomo.

No.	Title	Length
1.	"I Want a Dog"	2:49
2.	"Iambic Pentameter"	3:52
3.	"Basketball"	2:47
4.	"Sheraton Commander"	2:04
5.	"Dark Enough to See the Stars"	2:37
6.	"The One That Got Away"	2:52
7.	"The Deep and Dreamless Sleep"	4:36
Total length:		21:35

Vinyl-exclusive bonus track
No.	Title	Length
7.	"Why Don't You Get Me (Note: The vinyl version puts track 7 "The Deep and Dreamless Sleep" as track 8 on the tracklist.)"	3:10

== Personnel ==
Weezer

- Brian Bell
- Rivers Cuomo
- Scott Shriner
- Patrick Wilson

Additional musicians

- Jonathan Dreyfus – violin, viola, cello, double bass, orchestral arrangement, banjo, harmonium, harpsichord, Mellotron, theremin
- Jean-Louise Parker – violin, viola, recorder, backing vocals
- Max Bernstein – music direction
- Jonathan Leahy – string arrangement
- Amy Andersen – backing vocals
- Harry Cooper – clarinet
- Kelly O'Donohue – trumpet
- Jake Sinclair – additional vocals and synthesizer on "I Want a Dog"
- Efe Cakar – additional guitar on "Iambic Pentameter"
- Suzy Shinn – additional vocals on "Basketball"

Technical

- Suzy Shinn – production
- James Flannigan – production
- Rivers Cuomo – production
- Emily Lazar – mastering
- Chris Dugan – mixing
- Ivan Wayman – engineering
- Kevin Smith – engineering
- Jason Hiller – engineering
- Jonathan Dreyfus – engineering
- Peter Hanaman – engineering assistance
- Alissa Laymac – engineering assistance
- Alex Parker – engineering assistance
- Tori Newberry – engineering assistance
- Bella Corich – engineering assistance
- Matthew Harris – engineering assistance on "Basketball"
- Mike Fasano – drum technician
- Patrick Lehman – guitar technician
- Tension Division – art direction, design

== Charts ==
Chart performance for SZNZ: Winter
Chart (2023)	Peak position
Hungarian Physical Albums (MAHASZ)	38
Japanese Hot Albums (Billboard Japan)	97
Scottish Albums (Official Charts)	92
UK Album Downloads (Official Charts)	65
UK Physical Albums (OCC)	89
UK Sales Albums (OCC)	96
