= SZNZ: Summer =

Studio album by Weezer
- Released: June 21, 2022
- Studio: 4th Street (Santa Monica)
- Genres: Alternative rock; power pop; heavy metal
- Length: 23:37
- Labels: Atlantic; Crush
- Producer: Daniel Omelio

Weezer chronology
SZNZ: Spring (2022)	SZNZ: Summer (2022)	SZNZ: Autumn (2022)

Singles from SZNZ: Summer
- 1. "Records" Released: June 16, 2022

SZNZ: Summer is the seventeenth studio album by American rock band Weezer, and the second of four albums in their SZNZ (pronounced "seasons") project, originally designated as EPs. It was released digitally on June 21, 2022, coinciding with the Summer solstice. The album received its lead single "Records" just a few days before its release.

SZNZ: Summer was produced by Daniel Omelio, with additional production from regular collaborator Suzy Shinn.

== Background ==
Rivers Cuomo described the EP's sound as "21st century 90s". Aesthetically, he linked the project to 44 BC at the end of the Roman Republic, with an intended emotion of "youthful indignation".

== Release ==
On June 16, 2022, Weezer released the lead single, "Records", on an app called "Human Record Player". The app would play the song once the user spins themselves around clockwise like a record player. SZNZ: Summer was officially released on June 21, 2022, the day of the Summer Solstice.

== Critical reception ==
Professional ratings
Review scores
Source	Rating
Exclaim!	7/10
Gigwise	8/10 stars
Pitchfork	4.2/10
Riff Magazine	6/10
Spectrum Culture	70%
Under the Radar	4.5/10 stars

Alex Hudson at Exclaim! opined that SZNZ: Summer is their heaviest release, surpassing Maladroit and Van Weezer, largely praising the EP. Hudson, however, added "The only real blunder is Summer's glossy, quantized, computer-made sound; with the raw energy of playing live in a room, Weezer's Summer pyrotechnics display might have truly ignited, rather than simply smouldered." David Gill of Riff Magazine was slightly more critical of the EP, stating "Cuomo's patented brand of plainspoken emotional vulnerability is still there, but the psychological urgency of The Blue Album and Pinkerton seems to have been replaced by a kind of ironic, almost vocational indifference. It's as if, 30 years after releasing some of the most intense and evocative emo rock ever made, Cuomo and Weezer now approach music as a problem to solve rather than a vehicle for their own catharsis." In a negative review, Jesse Locke of Pitchfork wrote: "At this point in their career, Weezer are the musical equivalent of The Simpsons. Hacky, pandering, and decades past their best work..."

== Track listing ==
All tracks are written by Rivers Cuomo, except for "Records" written by Cuomo, Sam Hollander and Grant Phillip Michaels.

No.	Title	Length
1.	"Lawn Chair"	2:04
2.	"Records"	3:28
3.	"Blue Like Jazz"	3:12
4.	"The Opposite of Me"	3:30
5.	"What's the Good of Being Good"	4:02
6.	"Cuomoville"	3:16
7.	"Thank You and Good Night"	4:05
Total length:		23:37

Vinyl-exclusive bonus track
No.	Title	Length
7.	"Portia (Note: The vinyl version puts track 7 "Thank You and Good Night" as track 8 on the tracklist.)"	3:23

== Personnel ==
Weezer

- Brian Bell
- Rivers Cuomo
- Scott Shriner
- Patrick Wilson

Additional personnel

- Robopop – production
- Suzy Shinn – additional production, vocal production
- Charlie Brand – engineering
- Sejo Navajas – engineering assistance
- Andreas Sandnes – engineering assistance
- Bernie Grundman – mastering
- Tension Division – art direction, design

== Charts ==
Chart performance for SZNZ: Summer
Chart (2022)	Peak position
Scottish Albums (Official Charts)	73
UK Album Sales (OCC)	80
UK Album Downloads (Official Charts)	73
UK Physical Albums (OCC)	65
