= Weezer (White Album) =

2016 studio album by Weezer

Studio album by Weezer
- Released: April 1, 2016
- Recorded: 2015
- Genres: Alternative rock; power pop; pop-punk
- Length: 34:05
- Labels: Atlantic; Crush
- Producer: Jake Sinclair

Weezer chronology
Everything Will Be Alright in the End (2014)	Weezer (2016)	Pacific Daydream (2017)

Singles from Weezer
- 1. "Thank God for Girls" Released: October 26, 2015; 2. "Do You Wanna Get High?" Released: November 3, 2015; 3. "King of the World" Released: January 14, 2016; 4. "L.A. Girlz" Released: February 17, 2016; 5. "California Kids" Released: March 10, 2016

Weezer (also known as the White Album) is the tenth studio album by the American rock band Weezer, released on April 1, 2016. The album marks their first produced by Jake Sinclair. It is the first release through Crush Music and was distributed by Atlantic Records.

For the album, the band's frontman Rivers Cuomo explored new songwriting techniques, such as using a cut-up technique, and adding potential lyrics to a spreadsheet and including them on songs, such as "Summer Elaine and Drunk Dori" and "L.A. Girlz", based on their syllable count and word stress. The album explores themes of gender dynamics, modern dating experiences and references to religious iconography. Musically, the album serves as a throwback to the band's first two albums, Weezer (1994) and Pinkerton (1996), while also serving as a tribute to the Beach Boys.

Weezer continued the critical success of the band's previous release, Everything Will Be Alright in the End, while commercially improving on the previous release, reaching number four on the US Billboard 200 with 49,000 copies sold in its first week. The album produced three singles: "Thank God for Girls", "Do You Wanna Get High?" and "King of the World". Weezer received a Grammy Award nomination for Best Rock Album at the 59th Annual Grammy Awards.

== Background and recording ==
Following the release of Everything Will Be Alright in the End and the proceeding, small-scale promotional tour, Weezer separated from their management and instead signed with Crush Management. Immediately, the band's new manager, Jonathan Daniel, suggested the band produce a "beach album", a suggestion that band frontman Rivers Cuomo deemed "so obvious that we never even realized it". Also through Crush, Cuomo was able to meet producer Jake Sinclair, former engineer for the band's 2009 single, "(If You're Wondering If I Want You To) I Want You To", who at one point fronted a Weezer cover band named Wannabeezer. Sinclair invited Cuomo to his home studio and the two recorded an acoustic demo for "California Kids". Using the demo as a "center point of the next album", the band hired Sinclair as producer, first recording the single, "Do You Wanna Get High?".

Cuomo described his relationship with Sinclair as "constantly pulling each other in these different directions", the former wishing to "evolve and try crazy experiments", while the latter served as "the voice of the fans, very conservative"; Cuomo concluded that Sinclair had largely "won". Sinclair would often even interrupt Cuomo in the midst of a vocal take if Cuomo lost his Long Island accent, featured heavily on the Blue Album. Rhythm guitarist Brian Bell stated that "[Sinclair] knew how we should sound more than we knew how we should sound". Following the composition of each song, Sinclair would take the individual band member and work privately with them on their individual's instrument arrangement. Cuomo stated that this would allow for more "fresh and layered" ideas.

== Writing and composition ==
Weezer has been categorized as alternative rock, power pop and pop punk by music journalists. Cuomo described Weezer as a "beach album", based on his experiences "hanging around the Westside of Los Angeles, [...] with people in Venice and Santa Monica, the beach, the Hare Krishnas, the Sikh on roller blades with the guitar, girls on Tinder within a 4 mile radius, seeing other bands, the kids from La Sera." Cuomo specifically used Tinder to meet people for song ideas. Sonically, Cuomo credited The Beach Boys as a major influence, describing the album as "a '90s grungy take on '60s pop songs". Sinclair was also "determined to return Weezer to their Nineties glory", combining the "brashness and unpredictability of Pinkerton with the summer Beach Boys grunge pop of the Blue Album".

Appearing on the Song Exploder podcast, Cuomo explained his songwriting process for the album, particularly for the song "Summer Elaine and Drunk Dori". Cuomo maintained several Spotify playlists of music with "cool" chord progressions that he used to find musical inspiration. He used piano to write vocal melodies his vocal muscles would be "too lazy" to create themselves, while, conversely, improvising vocal melodies to write guitar solos, to avoid typical guitar habits and create solos with "space in [them] because I have to breathe" and "something you can sing along to". Cuomo also wrote stream-of-consciousness thoughts in his journal, then highlighted interesting lines, adding them to a spreadsheet of potential lyrics organized by number of syllables and strong-weak emphasis. When he came to write the songs on the album, he found lines that fit the melody and assembled them in a way that suggested a story. This method was also explored in "California Kids" and "L.A. Girlz".

=== Songs ===
Several critics described Weezer to be a concept album, their first since Pinkerton, with Pitchfork reviewer Zoe Camp labeling it a "a three-act tale of geek-meets-girl, followed en suite by boy-gets-heart-torn-asunder". In contrast, Mikael Wood described the songs as "[talking] vividly about desperate people in a would-be paradise", while Noisey commentator Emma Garland characterized them as a "vulnerable, weird, and intelligent outpouring from a dude who finds the world a difficult place to live in." As with previous Weezer albums, several references are made to pop culture, such as the 2014 film Whiplash, the online dating app Tinder, and Australian rock band 5 Seconds of Summer; however, several music critics noted more varied and obscure historical and religious-themed references throughout the album, such as the extinction of the Great auk, American composer Burt Bacharach, the concept of a female God, Brahmin youth reciting the veda and the atomic bombings of Hiroshima and Nagasaki. Music critics also noted several musical references to previous songs recorded by the band. Substream writer Scott Heisel commented on the similarities between "L.A. Girlz" and Weezer's 1994 B-side, "Susanne", as well as references to the guitar riff from the 1996 single, "El Scorcho", in "California Kids", and the bass line from Blue Album closer "Only in Dreams" being featured in the bridge to "King of the World". Zoe Camp also noted the album's opening riff as similar to that of their 1996 single, "Pink Triangle", and described some of "The White Album"'s tracks as "[Blue Album] retreads".

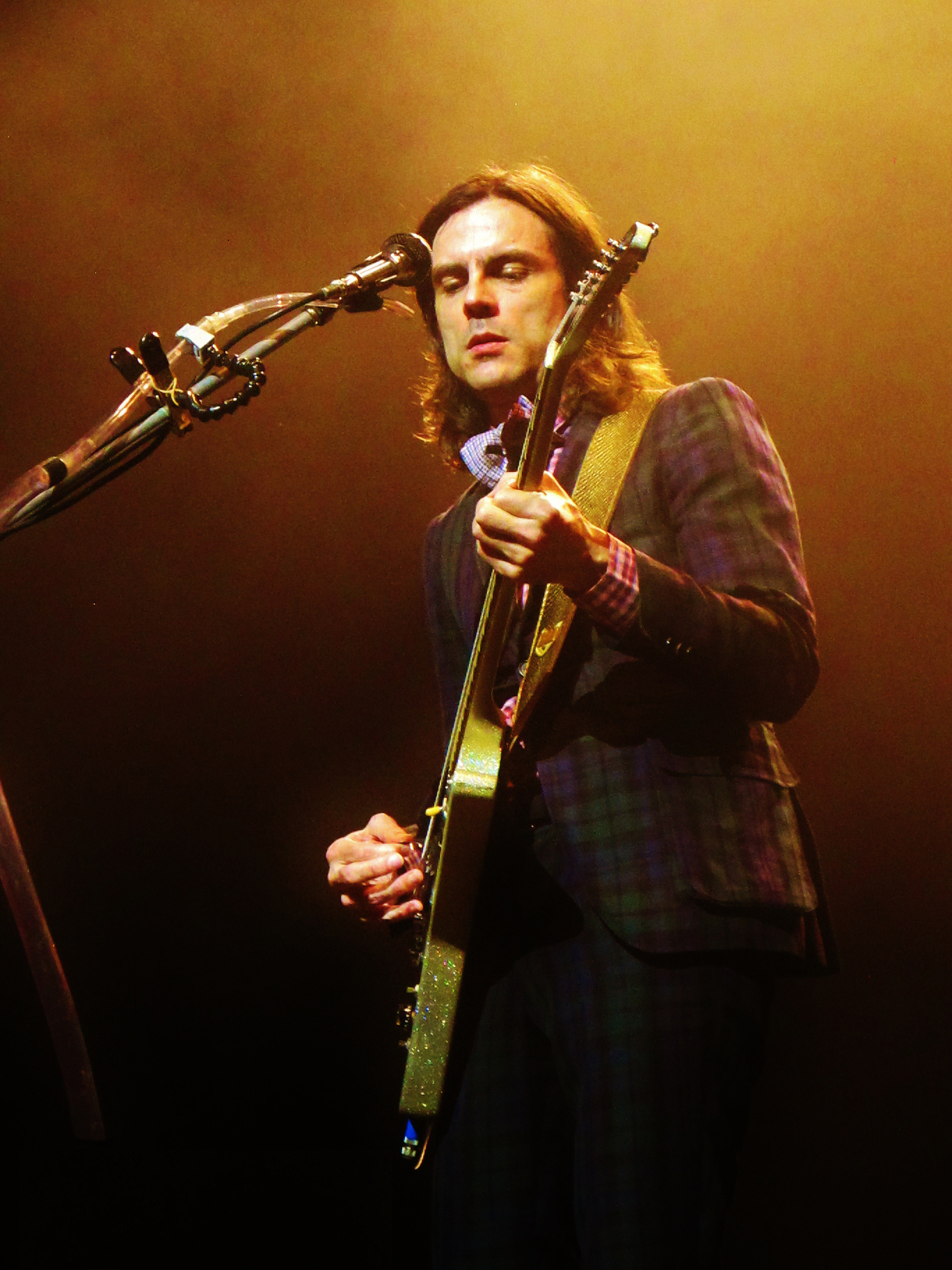
Rhythm guitarist Brian Bell (pictured) is credited with co-writing "L.A. Girlz" and "Endless Bummer".

The album's first song, "California Kids", written by Cuomo and Dan Wilson, was chosen from Cuomo's "backlog of 250 songs", based on the song "California" by Cuomo's Japanese band, Scott & Rivers. Cuomo based the titular phrase on the contrast of his kids' West Coast background, in comparison to his East Coast background and ultimately served as the primary inspiration for the album's beach theme. "Wind in Our Sail" introduces the "boy-meets-girl story with appearances [references] by Darwin, Mendel, and Sisyphus, while the album's debut single, "Thank God for Girls", plays "with some gender stereotypes", examining modern online dating experiences with apps like Tinder, as well as God's creation of Adam. Cuomo picked a "big, mainstream-ish title" to contrast with the "weirdness" of the track. The song features replayed elements from the December's Children track, "Trilogy". "(Girl We Got A) Good Thing", as described by Cuomo, is written in a "60s-style...major key boppy feel" combined with "the big 90s guitars we love". The song was originally titled "Co-Dependent" and described a relationship as it was "getting ugly", though he found melody did not combine well with the lyrical theme. In response, he chose the title "Good Thing" from his spreadsheets and wrote lyrics that, instead, described Cuomo's experiences on Venice Beach. The second single, "Do You Wanna Get High?", deals with Cuomo's prescription drug addiction in 2001, as well as his girlfriend at the time, describing it as "a really yucky and intentionally uncomfortable portrayal of the addict's life. There's nothing sexy, fun or funny about it." The unnamed woman also served as inspiration for the Green Album's closer, "O Girlfriend".

"King of the World", the album's third single, deals directly with Cuomo's marriage to Kyoko Cuomo and her issues with anxiety. "Summer Elaine and Drunk Dori", written solely by Cuomo, featured a key change into the chorus, as well as a "pretty extended satisfying guitar solo that I get to play [... as well as] this sublimated sexual longing in the lyrics. It's an energy I've long identified with going back to Weezer's first two albums. It's not sexual [...] it's more like, it gets repressed and has to come out in these gorgeous soaring melodies like Brian Wilson." Cuomo listed the track as his favorite off the album. "L.A. Girlz", written by Cuomo, Bell and Luther Russell–featuring references to The Divine Comedy, Whiplash, and the Lewis Carroll poem "Jabberwocky"–serves as a "throwback to the Blue Album, with Wall of Sound-like production values, sweeping guitars" and deals with the lyrical theme of longing, with "Cuomo's voice [quivering] right along the borderline between hope and fear even as he makes an undisguised declaration of love in the bridge." Bell and Russell composed the melody, chords and the title, while Cuomo wrote the lyrics. "Jacked Up", written by Cuomo, Jonny Coffer and British DJ Redlight, "introduces a [...] shade of melancholy", using "bordello piano pulse and Cuomo's falsetto to inject anticipation of regret into a one-night stand". "Endless Bummer", co-written by Cuomo, Bell and Russell, serves as the "acoustic closing track where the summer fun finally dies out and the narrator laments [...] the emptiness of it all."

== Release and promotion ==
In late 2015, the band released two singles in a two-week succession: "Thank God for Girls" and "Do You Wanna Get High?", though Cuomo stated they had no official plans for an album. The band announced the album on January 14, 2016, along with the third single "King of the World". On February 17, 2016, "L.A. Girlz" was premiered on through Apple Music, a song which was released on February 18, 2016. A fifth song from the album, "California Kids", was released on March 10, 2016. On February 25, 2016, it was announced that Warner Music Group via Atlantic Records would release the album via their new joint venture with Crush Management, Crush Music.

In promotion of the album, Weezer performed with Panic! at the Disco on the Weezer & Panic! at the Disco Summer Tour 2016. Coinciding with the start of the tour, the band released a five-track acoustic EP through Spotify, featuring two songs off the album: "California Kids" and "King of the World".

On October 7, 2016, Weezer released a deluxe edition of the White Album on digital outlets, containing an additional four tracks: "I Love the USA", a song the band had previously released on June 30 as part of Apple Music and NASA's celebration of the Juno space probe's impending landing on Jupiter; a remix of "Jacked Up" with guest vocals from Michael "Fitz" Fitzpatrick of Fitz and the Tantrums and Nadya Tolokonnikova of Pussy Riot; and two previously unreleased songs from the White Album sessions, "Friend of a Friend" and "Fake Smiles and Nervous Laughter". Later in the year, two White Album outtakes, "The Last Days of Summer" and "Prom Night", were released as a 7" vinyl single for the official Weezer Fan Club.

== Critical reception ==
Professional ratings
Aggregate scores
Source	Rating
AnyDecentMusic?	6.9/10
Metacritic	71/100
Review scores
Source	Rating
AllMusic	4.5/5 stars
The A.V. Club	B
Entertainment Weekly	B
The Guardian	3/5 stars
Newsday	A
NME	4/5
Pitchfork	6.2/10
Q	4/5 stars
Rolling Stone	3.5/5 stars
Spin	8/10

According to the review aggregator Metacritic, Weezer received "generally favorable reviews" based on a weighted average score of 71 out of 100 from 29 critic scores.

Stephen Thomas Erlewine at AllMusic stated that "The White Album winds up existing in a fantasy world that's entirely the band's own creation", calling it "Weezer's version of Southern California". Erlewine specifically highlighted the tracks "California Kids", "Thank God for Girls" and "Jacked Up". Evan Lucy of Alternative Press declared the album as Weezer's best material in 15 years, stating "feel free to call it a resurgence, a comeback, a resurrection or whatever else you will. All that really matters is that the White Album's songs are great, and not just great for the 2016 version of Weezer." In a positive review for Chorus.fm, Aaron Mook writes, "what I can say for certain about The White Album (and its predecessor) is that for the first time since 2002, it sounds like Weezer are not only enjoying the music they're making, but living up to the admittedly impossible standards some Blue Album and Pinkerton purists tend to hold. With The White Album, Weezer solidify their place as a more-than-capable modern pop-rock band." Staff reviewer SowingSeason at Sputnikmusic described the album as "long awaited and worthy successor to Pinkerton", stating "The White Album manages to deliver on the promise showed by the Blue Album and Pinkerton without spending the entire time treading on familiar ground." The A.V. Club reviewer John Hugar praised Cuomo for "[writing] some ridiculously fun, optimistic tunes", positively comparing the tracks to the band's 90's work, as well as Pet Sounds-era Beach Boys.

Sputnikmusic described "Thank God for Girls" as "perhaps the greatest song Weezer has written in over a decade [...] the creative highlight of the band's late career" and using the album to describe the band as achieving a "successful comeback." Philip Cosores of Consequence of Sound, in contrast, criticized the singles "Thank God for Girls" and "King of the World", commenting "the great thing about their last two albums is that these moments are rarities and, considering the band's standing in the rock world, might be a necessary evil. If it takes a couple bullshit alt singles to anchor a collection of vintage Weezer melodies, then it's a worthy sacrifice." Not all reviews were positive. In a largely mixed review, Pitchfork reviewer Zoe Camp criticized the largely pop-oriented background of the album's personnel, as well as songs such as "Wind in Our Sail" and "(Girl We Got A) Good Thing"; though she did comment positively on the singles "L.A. Girlz" and "King of the World", calling the former "the group's best single since "Island in the Sun.".

The album appeared on several annual "best-of" lists in 2016. In early July Spin listed the album as among the best album releases of 2016 thus far. Pitchfork readers named Weezer the 34th best album of the year and the eighth most underrated album of the year NPR readers listed the album as the 62nd best of the year, while Verge Campus named it the album of the year. Meanwhile, NPR listed "California Kids" as the 55th best song of 2016, while Entertainment Weekly named "King of the World" as the 94th.

=== Accolades ===
Publication	Accolade	Year	Rank	Ref.
Pitchfork	Readers' Top 50 Albums of 2016	2016	34	
Pitchfork	Readers' Most Underrated Albums of 2016	2016	8	

== Commercial performance ==
Weezer debuted at number four on the Billboard 200 with 49,000 units sold, making it Weezer's sixth top five album, as well as the band's eighth top 10 album in a row. However, it stayed only two weeks in the top 100 of the chart. The album debuted at number 10 on the Canadian Albums Chart, selling 3,600 copies. As of September 2, 2016, the record has sold over 75,000 copies worldwide.

== Track listing ==
All tracks are written by Rivers Cuomo, with additional writers noted.

No.	Title	Writer(s)	Length
1.	"California Kids"	Dan Wilson	3:27
2.	"Wind in Our Sail"	Scott Chesak; Ryan Spraker	2:53
3.	"Thank God for Girls"	Alex Goose; Michael Balzer; Alex Balzer; Bill Petti	3:30
4.	"(Girl We Got A) Good Thing"		3:25
5.	"Do You Wanna Get High?"		3:27
6.	"King of the World"	Jarrad Kritzstein	3:24
7.	"Summer Elaine and Drunk Dori"		3:25
8.	"L.A. Girlz"	Brian Bell; Luther Russell	3:29
9.	"Jacked Up"	Jonathan Coffer; Hugh Pescod	2:53
10.	"Endless Bummer"	Bell; Russell	4:14
Total length:			34:07

Japanese bonus track
No.	Title	Length
11.	"Prom Night"	3:34

Digital deluxe edition
No.	Title	Writer(s)	Length
11.	"I Love the USA"	Sam Hollander	3:09
12.	"Jacked Up" (remix; featuring Fitz of Fitz and the Tantrums and Nadya of Pussy Riot)	Coffer; Pescod; Michael Fitzpatrick; Nadya Tolokonnikova	2:56
13.	"Friend of a Friend"		2:58
14.	"Fake Smiles and Nervous Laughter"		3:26

Weezer Fan Club bonus track
No.	Title	Length
15.	"The Last Days of Summer"	2:35

== Personnel ==
Weezer

- Rivers Cuomo – lead vocals, lead guitar, keyboards
- Patrick Wilson – drums, percussion
- Brian Bell – rhythm guitar, backing vocals, keyboards
- Scott Shriner – bass guitar, backing vocals, piano on "Thank God for Girls" and "(Girl We Got a) Good Thing"

Additional musicians

- Scott Chesak – additional production and piano on "Wind In Our Sail"
- Jonny Coffer – additional production and piano on "Jacked Up"
- Michael Fitzpatrick – guest vocals on "Jacked Up" (Remix)
- Alex Goose – additional production and organ on "Thank God For Girls"
- Ryan Spraker – additional production and piano on "Wind In Our Sail"
- Nadya Tolokonnikova – guest vocals on "Jacked Up" (Remix)
- Christopher Wray – synthesizers

Production

- Suzy Shinn – engineer
- Jake Sinclair – producer
- Tanner Sparks – engineer

== Charts ==
Chart (2016)	Peak position
Australian Albums (ARIA)	28
Austrian Albums (Ö3 Austria)	51
Belgian Albums (Ultratop Flanders)	65
Belgian Albums (Ultratop Wallonia)	111
Canadian Albums (Billboard)	10
Dutch Albums (Album Top 100)	49
German Albums (Offizielle Top 100)	51
Irish Albums (IRMA)	27
New Zealand Albums (RMNZ)	28
Swiss Albums (Schweizer Hitparade)	39
UK Albums (Official Charts)	24
US Billboard 200	4
US Top Alternative Albums (Billboard)	1
US Top Rock Albums (Billboard)	1
