= The Lion and the Witch =

2002 live EP by Weezer

EP (live) by Weezer
- Released: September 24, 2002
- Recorded: May 2002
- Genres: Alternative rock; power pop
- Length: 26:24
- Label: Geffen
- Producer: Rupert Peasley

Weezer chronology
Maladroit (2002)	The Lion and the Witch (2002)	Make Believe (2005)

Weezer EP chronology
Christmas CD (2001)	The Lion and the Witch (2002)	Christmas with Weezer (2008)

Professional ratings
Review scores
Source	Rating
AllMusic	3/5 stars
Punknews.org	3.5/5 stars
Tiny Mix Tapes	1/5 stars

The Lion and the Witch is a live EP by American rock band Weezer. The EP was recorded in Japan in the spring of 2002 while promoting Maladroit; it was released on September 24, 2002, exactly six years after the release of Pinkerton. It was distributed as a limited edition release in independently owned music stores with only 25,000 copies having been made. The album was then rereleased and remastered on vinyl in 2015, with only 3,000 copies made.

Like Maladroit, the marketing of this EP caused a rift between Weezer and their record label, Geffen Records. The band wanted an eight-song EP with unique packaging that would not involve crystal cases. Geffen told the band that the packaging idea was too expensive and the number of songs on the EP needed to be reduced from eight songs to six as to not upset the other retailers, who would not be receiving the disc. The artwork and packaging stuck but the disc's length was reduced to six songs, along with a "hidden track": an instrumental track titled "Polynesia", which opens the disc.

== Recording ==
While recording the EP, the band makes two errors on this live disc. Rivers Cuomo accidentally begins singing the third verse of "El Scorcho" during the second verse and Scott Shriner, who had been in the band for less than a year at the time of this show, forgets the words in the bridge to "Holiday," causing the other members of the band to crack up. After the performance is through, Cuomo muses "Scott just won a Grammy!" In addition to that error, the last track is thirty seconds shorter than what the band intended and there is a noticeable cut off on the finished disc. None of the music is missing, but there was more after-song commentary that the band wanted on the disc. The full version of this track was released shortly thereafter on the band's website in mp3 format.

== Artwork ==
The cover art was designed by Los Angeles–based duo kozyndan. The liner notes of the album have a number of fan letters from Japanese Weezer fans in broken English. The notes also list production credits for Rupert Peasley, who is known among fans as the man on the couch on the cover of Maladroit, and E.O. Smith, which is a pseudonym for Rivers Cuomo, who went to E.O. Smith High School. Only 25,000 individually numbered copies of the disc were made apparently some fans have copies of the disc with numbers over 25,000. As noted at the band's website, the numbering was disrupted by printing difficulties with the cardboard sleeve.

== Track listing ==
All tracks are written by Rivers Cuomo.

No.	Title	Length
1.	"Dope Nose"	5:20
2.	"Island in the Sun"	3:55
3.	"Falling for You"	4:23
4.	"Death and Destruction"	4:19
5.	"El Scorcho"	4:16
6.	"Holiday"	4:10
Total length:		26:24

== Personnel ==
Personnel taken from The Lion and the Witch CD booklet.

Weezer

- Rivers Cuomo
- Pat Wilson
- Brian Bell
- Scott Shriner

Production

- Rupert Peasley – production, liner notes
- Craig Overbay – recording
- Dave Collins – mastering
- Karl Koch – photography
