= Weezer – Video Capture Device: Treasures from the Vault 1991–2002 =

2004 film

Video Capture Device
- Directed by: Karl Koch
- Produced by: Karl Koch; Ray Ibe
- Starring: Rivers Cuomo; Patrick Wilson; Brian Bell; Scott Shriner; Matt Sharp; Mikey Welsh; Jason Cropper
- Cinematography: Carolyn Chen; Scott Henriksen
- Edited by: Patty Gannon; Brad F. Kluck; Eric Zumbrunnen
- Music by: Weezer
- Distributed by: Geffen
- Release date: 2004
- Running time: 180 min.
- Language: English

Video Capture Device (full title Weezer – Video Capture Device: Treasures from the Vault 1991–2002) is a DVD released by rock band Weezer. It contains footage from various live gigs in the band's history, from the early stages of their musical career until 2002. The DVD also contains all of the Weezer music videos from The Blue Album until Maladroit. Bonus footage features the band backstage, on-stage, in the recording studio and in interviews.

== Track list ==
Video Capture Device track listing
No.	Title	Director	Length
1.	"Undone - The Sweater Song"	Spike Jonze	4:14
2.	"Undone - The Sweater Song (Alternate Take)"	Jonze	4:49
3.	"Weezer Goes To New York: The Making Of The Blue Album" (Written-By ["Surf Wax America"] – Patrick Wilson)		10:17
4.	"In The Garage (Live)"		3:35
5.	"Buddy Holly"	Jonze	4:07
6.	"Jamie (Live)"		3:49
7.	"Buddy Holly News"		1:17
8.	"Saction"		11:47
9.	"Say It Ain't So"	Sophie Muller	4:07
10.	"Say It Ain't So (B-Roll Alternate)"		4:35
11.	"Say It Ain't So - Live On Late Night With David Letterman"		3:39
12.	"Weezer Goes To Van Nuys: The Making Of Pinkerton"		13:17
13.	"El Scorcho (Director's Cut)"	Mark Romanek	4:14
14.	"El Scorcho (Live/B-Roll Alternate)"		5:05
15.	"The Good Life"	Jonathan Dayton and Valerie Faris	4:08
16.	"Good Life (B-Roll Alternate)"		4:25
17.	"Pink Triangle"	Jennifer Wilson; Karl Koch	4:43
18.	"Pink Triangle (Live, Acoustic)"		4:25
19.	"Mykel And Carli (Live)"		6:29
20.	"My Brain (Live)"		3:48
21.	"Outlog"		4:15
22.	"Stoopid Fresh (Green Album Preparations)" (Arranged By ["My Evaline"] – Sigmund Spaeth, Written-By ["The Pedlar"] – Traditional)		6:04
23.	"Hash Pipe"	Marcos Siega	2:55
24.	"How Not To Do An Interview"		3:01
25.	"Island in the Sun (Version 1)"	Siega	4:41
26.	"Island in the Sun (Version 2)"	Jonze	3:11
27.	"Photograph"	Koch	2:56
28.	"Dope Nose"	Siega	2:19
29.	"Dope Nose (B-Roll Alternate)"	Tim Bellomo	2:22
30.	"Eurotrash"		6:10
31.	"Take Control (Live)"	Koch	3:45
32.	"Fall Together (Pre-Show Warmup)"	Koch	1:34
33.	"Keep Fishin'"	Siega	4:30
34.	"Slob"	Koch	3:25
35.	"Prodigy Lover (Demo Session)"	Rod Cervera	3:05
36.	"Credits" (Performer ["Photograph"] – Steven Avila)	Brad Kluck; Cervera	3:46
Total length:			2:44:49

=== Easter egg ===
Highlighting "Maladroit" on the TV Promos section and pressing right will make a large =w= symbol appear. Click on it to see the bonus feature "Wig Fishin" featuring Weezer frontman Rivers Cuomo wearing a long blonde wig during an appearance on British television program Popworld. The European edition of the DVD is lacking this bonus feature.

== Sales ==
The DVD debuted at #1 on Billboard's Top Music Video charts and has sold 78,968 copies as of October 2005, thus making it certified as a Gold selling DVD.

In the UK the DVD reached number 13 in the Official Music Video Chart.
