= Do You Wanna Get High? =

Single by Weezer

from the album Weezer (The White Album)
- Released: November 3, 2015
- Recorded: 2015
- Genre: Alternative rock; power pop
- Length: 3:27
- Label: Crush; Weezer
- Songwriter: Rivers Cuomo
- Producer: Jake Sinclair

Weezer singles chronology
"Thank God for Girls" (2015)	"Do You Wanna Get High?" (2015)	"King of the World" (2016)

Music video
- "Do You Wanna Get High?" on YouTube

"Do You Wanna Get High?" is a song by the American rock band Weezer, released on November 3, 2015, for the band's self-titled 2016 album.

== Composition ==
Concept-wise, "Do You Wanna Get High?" is about Rivers Cuomo's former addiction to prescription pills, which he did along with his girlfriend he had in 2000 and 2001. Cuomo states "Suddenly the song is sunny and sweet and in my mind, creatively this is when the high kicks in — everything is lovely and dreamy." Jon Blistein of Rolling Stone compared the song's opening feedback to that of "No Other One" from Pinkerton. Alex Young at Consequence of Sound compared the song's "bombastic guitar riffs and earworm hooks" to Pinkerton. Genre-wise, it has been described as an "alt rock chugger" and a "power pop jam".

== Reception ==
Chris DeVille at Stereogum held the song in higher regards than the previous single, "Thank God for Girls", describing it as "Pinkerton style meets Green Album quality". Carolyn Menyes from Music Times stated "'Do You Wanna Get High?' is a hard-hitting song and reminds fans that for every goofy Weezer song, there's this sort of real rock gem. And, for bonus points, there's a soaring guitar solo that brings the real hardness of this song all the way home." At Spin, Andrew Unterberger ranked it as the 14th best post-Pinkerton Weezer song, observing "the narcotic temptations of the lyrics give 'High' a darkness and intrigue we never heard from Cuomo the first time around, thankfully keeping it from becoming cartoonish in its retro leanings."
