= The Long Goodbye (band) =

American indie band

- Origin: Los Angeles, California, United States
- Genres: Indie
- Members: Michael Cera; Clark Duke; Christian Buenaventura

The Long Goodbye is a Los Angeles–based indie band whose members include actors Michael Cera (of Arrested Development, Superbad and Juno), his Clark and Michael co-star Clark Duke, and drummer Christian Buenaventura. A feature in the September 2007 issue of Spin describes the band's songs as “silly, confessional, and off-the-cuff rag-tag ditties,” based on “simple structures” and “adolescent-in-love lyrics.”

The band's original material is available on its MySpace page, including songs “Can I Call You Mine,” “Leading Man,” and “Pilgrim.” The band credits Weezer as a musical influence (a cover of Weezer's “El Scorcho” is available on YouTube); Cera calls Weezer's Pinkerton his “favorite album of all time."

The band remains unsigned as of August 26, 2007, and LimeWire Music Blog suggests, “Based on the lo-fi quality of the band’s recordings, it is clear that the boys view their side-project as a goalless hobby, or just an excuse to carry around guitars.” This perception is reinforced by a November 13, 2006, posting on the band's MySpace blog which reads, “We will not post lyrics. Most of them aren't that great anyhow... you're not missing anything.” On March 12, 2007, a posting by Clark Duke on the band's MySpace blog indicated that “a side band is forthcoming.”

In addition to Weezer, the band's MySpace page credits the following musical influences: Destroyer, David Bowie, Bob Dylan, Brian Wilson, Beulah, Big Star, Of Montreal, Sufjan Stevens, The Decemberists, Death Cab for Cutie, Ben Kweller, Sparklehorse, The Unicorns, The Rentals, and Built to Spill.
