= King of the World (Weezer song) =

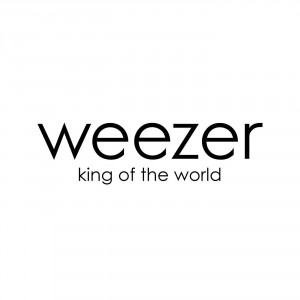

Single by Weezer

from the album Weezer (White Album)
- Released: January 14, 2016
- Recorded: 2015
- Genre: Grunge
- Length: 3:24
- Label: Crush; Weezer
- Songwriters: Rivers Cuomo; Jarrad Kritzstein

Weezer singles chronology
"Do You Wanna Get High?" (2015)	"King of the World" (2016)	"L.A. Girlz" (2016)

Music video
- "King of the World" on YouTube

"King of the World" is a song by the American rock band Weezer, released as a single on January 14, 2016, for the band's self-titled 2016 album, along with a music video.

== Composition ==
Mark Beaumont of NME said that the song, as well as "LA Girlz", are "noble throwbacks to the quirky grunge of Weezer’s debut".

== Reception ==
Bill Bodkin at Pop-Break opined "Hearkening back to the sound of the Blue and Green albums, and even some of the Red album, 'King of the World' kicks ass with classic Weezer crunch." Bodkin also praises Rivers Cuomo's songwriting for the song, stating that he writes with "hope and feel-good vibes". Chris DeVille at Stereogum described the song as "[feeling] like ’90s Weezer with room to breathe".

== Live performances ==
On March 31, 2016, "King of the World" was performed on The Tonight Show Starring Jimmy Fallon in celebration of the release of Weezer's 2016 album. Rivers was dressed as Elvis Presley during the performance. The song was performed the following day on Good Morning America, where a photo was shot with the band and several Major League Baseball mascots.

== Music video ==
A music video for "King of the World" was released on January 14, 2016, and was directed by Scantron Films. The video features a bearded man in a king's crown and cape, running along a boardwalk, causing havoc, whom eventually gets caught by a police officer, who arrests him.

== Charts ==
=== Weekly charts ===
Chart (2016)	Peak position
US Hot Rock & Alternative Songs (Billboard)	39
US Rock & Alternative Airplay (Billboard)	17
US Alternative Airplay (Billboard)	17

=== Year-end charts ===
Chart (2016)	Position
US Alternative Songs (Billboard)	38
US Rock Airplay Songs (Billboard)	46
