= MDW Tag Team Championship =

Professional wrestling tag team championship

Details
- Promotion: Mason-Dixon Wrestling
- Date established: November 1, 1997
- Current champion: The Soviet Terrors
- Date won: November 16, 2002

Other name
- ACCW Tag Team Championship
Statistics
- First champions: The Batten Twins (Brad and Bart Batten)
- Most reigns: The Thrillbillies (5)
- Longest reign: The Thrillbillies (320 days)
- Shortest reign: The Masked Assassins (1 day)

The MDW Tag Team Championship is a professional wrestling tag team championship in Mason-Dixon Wrestling (MDW). It was the original tag team title of the Atlantic Coast Championship Wrestling promotion during its first year of operation. In December 1998, the promotion became Mason-Dixon Wrestling and the title became the MDW Tag Team Championship.

The inaugural champions were The Batten Twins (Brad and Bart Batten), after defeating Dark Overlord and Gatekeeper in New Martinsville, West Virginia on November 1, 1997 to become the first ACCW Tag Team Champions. The Thrillbillies (Ox Williams and Jed Goodman) hold the record for most reigns, with five. At 320 days, The Thrillbillies's first championship reign is the longest in the title's history. The Masked Assassins' fourth and final reign was the shortest in the history of the title lasting only 1 day. Overall, there have been 20 reigns shared between 11 teams, with two vacancies.

== Title history ==
Key

#	Order in reign history
Reign	The reign number for the specific set of wrestlers listed
Event	The event in which the title was won
—	Used for vacated reigns so as not to count it as an official reign
N/A	The information is not available or is unknown
+	Indicates the current reign is changing daily

=== Names ===
Name	Years
ACCW Tag Team Championship	1997 — 1999
MDW Tag Team Championship	1999 — 2002

=== Reigns ===
#	Wrestlers	Reign	Date	Days held	Location	Event	Notes	Ref.
1	Brad and Bart Batten (The Batten Twins)	1	November 1, 1997	7	New Martinsville, West Virginia	Live event	The Battens defeated Dark Overlord and Gatekeeper to become the first ACCW Tag Team Champions.	
2	R.J. Stomper and Cousin Elmer (Country Cousins)	1	November 8, 1997	154	Kingwood, West Virginia	Live event		
3	Frank Parker and Roger Anderson (Death and Destruction)	1	April 11, 1998	182	Buckhannon, West Virginia	Live event		
4	Eddie Edmonds and Mike Morgan (Baltimore Bad Boys)	1	October 10, 1998	56	Buckhannon, West Virginia	Live event		
5	Brute Shooter and Seth James (Brute Force)	1	December 5, 1998	7	Clarksburg, West Virginia	Live event		
6	Baltimore Bad Boys	2	December 12, 1998	6	Buckhannon, West Virginia	Live event		
7	Brute Force	2	December 20, 1998	103	Shinnston, West Virginia	Live event	On December 20, 1998, the title is renamed the MDW Tag Team Championship when the promotion is renamed Mason-Dixon Wrestling.	
8	Chico and Flemo (El Guanos)	1	April 2, 1999	19	Buckhannon, West Virginia	Live event		
9	Nevada Crippler and Ox Williams (Mass Destruction)	1	April 21, 1999	95	Nutter Fort, West Virginia	Live event		
10	DOA and Tommy Hawk	1	July 25, 1999	19	Charlestown, West Virginia	Live event		
11	Ox Williams and Jed Goodman (The Thrillbillies)	1	August 13, 1999	320	Buckhannon, West Virginia	Live event		
12	Masked Assassin #1 and Masked Assassin #2 (The Masked Assassins)	1	June 28, 2000	164	Stonewood, West Virginia	Live event		
13	The Thrillbillies	2	December 9, 2000	N/A	Morgantown, West Virginia	Live event		
14	The Masked Assassins	2	March 2001	N/A	N/A	Live event	The Masked Assassins are awarded the titles when The Thrillbillies fail to appear for scheduled title defenses due to injuries. The team later unmask revealing themselves as Punchy McGee and Boomer Payne.	
15	The Thrillbillies	3	August 4, 2001	56	Nutter Fort, West Virginia	Blackberry Festival (2001)		
16	The Masked Assassins	3	September 29, 2001	69	Morgantown, West Virginia	Live event		
17	The Thrillbillies	4	December 7, 2001	20	Stonewood, West Virginia	Live event		
18	The Masked Assassins	4	December 7, 2001	1	Stonewood, West Virginia	Live event	The titles are returned to Masked Assassins by the MDW executive committee due to a technicality.	
19	The Thrillbillies	5	December 8, 2001	297	Morgantown, West Virginia	Live event		
—	Vacated	—	October 1, 2002	—	N/A	N/A	The championship is vacated when The Thrillbillies announce their retirement.	
20	Nikita Allanov and Zubov (The Soviet Terrors)	1	November 16, 2002	N/A	Morgantown, West Virginia	Live event	The Soviet Terrors defeated Jack Miller and Kid Apollo in a tournament final to win the vacant titles.	

== List of top combined reigns ==
=== By team ===
Rank	Team	# Of Reigns	Combined Days
1	Ox Williams and Jed Goodman (The Thrillbillies)	5	693+
2	Masked Assassin #1 and Masked Assassin #2 (The Masked Assassins)	4	234+
3	Frank Parker and Roger Anderson (Death and Destruction)	1	182
4	R.J. Stomper and Cousin Elmer (Country Cousins)	1	154
5	Brute Shooter and Seth James (Brute Force)	2	110
6	Nevada Crippler and Ox Williams (Mass Destruction)	1	95
7	Eddie Edmonds and Mike Morgan (Baltimore Bad Boys)	2	62
8	DOA and Tommy Hawk	1	19
09	Chico and Flemo (El Guanos)	1	19
10	Brad and Bart Batten (The Batten Twins)	1	7

=== By wrestler ===
Rank	Wrestler	# Of Reigns	Combined Days
1	Ox Williams	6	788+
2	Jed Goodman	5	693+
3	Masked Assassin #1	4	234+
4	Masked Assassin #2	3	234+
5	Frank Parker	1	182
6	Roger Anderson	1	182
7	R.J. Stomper	3	154
8	Cousin Elmer	2	154
9	Brute Shooter	2	110
10	Seth James	2	110
