= Thank God for Girls (song) =

Single by Weezer

from the album Weezer (White Album)
- Released: October 26, 2015
- Recorded: 2015
- Genre: Alternative rock; power pop; rap rock
- Length: 3:29
- Label: Crush; Weezer
- Songwriters: Rivers Cuomo; Alex Goose; Michael Balzer; Alex Balzer; Bill Petti
- Producer: Jake Sinclair

Weezer singles chronology
"Da Vinci" (2014)	"Thank God for Girls" (2015)	"Do You Wanna Get High?" (2015)

Music video
- "Thank God for Girls" on YouTube

"Thank God for Girls" is a song by American rock band Weezer. The song was released on October 26, 2015, and was the lead single for their self-titled 2016 album. The release of the song was accompanied by a lyric video which prominently features the cannoli mentioned in the song's first verse.

== Commercial reception ==
After two days of radio airplay, "Thank God for Girls" was ranked as the most-added song of the week on alternative radio stations in the United States. It impacted more than twice as many stations as the next most-added song, the 1975's "Love Me".

== Music video ==
The official music video was released on November 16, 2015. Prior to this, a lyric video for the song was posted to Weezer's VEVO channel on October 25, 2015, a day prior to the song's official release. It was directed by Scantron Films, a production company whose credits also include the music video for Fall Out Boy's "Uma Thurman."

== Charts ==
=== Weekly charts ===
Chart (2015–16)	Peak position
Canada Rock (Billboard)	24
US Hot Rock & Alternative Songs (Billboard)	13
US Rock & Alternative Airplay (Billboard)	15

=== Year-end charts ===
Chart (2016)	Position
US Alternative Songs (Billboard)	36
US Hot Rock Songs (Billboard)	86
US Rock Airplay Songs (Billboard)	47
