= Keep Fishin' =

Single by Weezer

from the album Maladroit
- Released: September 20, 2002
- Recorded: December 2001
- Genre: Power pop; rock; pop-punk
- Length: 2:52 (album version); 3:05 (radio edit)
- Label: Geffen
- Songwriter: Rivers Cuomo
- Producer: Weezer

Weezer singles chronology
"Dope Nose" (2002)	"Keep Fishin'" (2002)	"Beverly Hills" (2005)

Music video
- "Keep Fishin'" on YouTube

"Keep Fishin'" is a song by the American rock band Weezer. It is the second single from the band's fourth album, Maladroit.

== Reception ==
Melissa Bobbitt at About.com ranked "Keep Fishin'" as the 13th best Weezer song, where she comments "Rivers Cuomo has always had an affinity for the paranoid in his lyrics". It was named as one of the 12 best post-Pinkerton Weezer songs by The A.V. Club, where they state "It's the kind of infectious, impeccably crafted power-pop rocker Cuomo can probably bang out in his sleep".

Commercially, the song peaked at No. 15 on the US Billboard Hot Modern Rock Tracks chart. The song also reached No. 24 on the Triple J Hottest 100 in 2002.

== Music video ==
The music video, directed by Marcos Siega, features Weezer as guests on The Muppet Show as drummer Patrick Wilson is held captive by Miss Piggy. As noted in the Weezer Video Capture Device DVD, it marks the acting debut for the band members in a music video. At one point, Kevin Smith was attached to direct the video for this song, but without the Muppets.

The video premiered on July 14, 2002, on MTV2, accompanied by a half-hour special showcasing behind-the-scenes footage from the video's shoot.

== Track listing ==
Radio Only Promo CD

1. "Keep Fishin'" (Radio Version)
2. "Keep Fishin'" (Album Version)

US Retail CD

1. "Keep Fishin'" (Radio Version)
2. "Keep Fishin'" (Franklin Mint Version)

UK CD #1

1. "Keep Fishin'" (Radio Version)
2. "Photograph" (Live)
3. "Death and Destruction" (Live)
4. "Keep Fishin'" (CD-ROM Video)

UK CD #2

1. "Keep Fishin'" (Radio Version)
2. "Slob" (Live)"
3. "Knock-Down Drag-Out" (Live)
4. "Dope Nose" (CD-ROM Video)

UK 7" (Green Vinyl)

1. "Keep Fishin'" (Radio Version)
2. "Photograph" (Live)

Notes:
The radio/video version of Keep Fishin' is a completely re-recorded version of the song.
The Franklin Mint version is an electronic interpretation by drummer Patrick Wilson.
The live tracks were recorded in Japan.

== Charts ==
Chart (2002)	Peak position
Scotland Singles (Official Charts)	27
UK Singles (Official Charts)	29
US Alternative Airplay (Billboard)	15
