= Christmas CD =

EP by Weezer
- Released: January 1, 2001
- Recorded: October–November 2000
- Studio: Mocha Fusion (Los Angeles)
- Genres: Alternative rock; Christmas
- Length: 5:35
- Label: Geffen
- Producer: Weezer

Weezer chronology
Pinkerton (1996)	Christmas CD (2001)	Weezer (2001)

Weezer EP chronology
The Good Life — OZ EP (1997)	Christmas CD (2001)	The Lion and the Witch (2002)

Alternative cover
- Winter Weezerland cover

Christmas CD (also called Christmas EP or simply Christmas on music streaming platforms, or Winter Weezerland on iTunes) is a two-track promotional EP by American rock band Weezer, officially released January 1, 2001. It was sent to radio stations, as well as in small quantities to members of the band's fan club. The songs were recorded at Rivers Cuomo's home studio, dubbed "Mocha Fusion Studios", in October and November 2000.

The cover of the CD features the band members dressed in Santa Claus costumes, photographed by Weezer webmaster and historian Karl Koch in November 2000.

== Release ==
The song "Christmas Celebration" was initially released as an MP3 to members of the Weezer Fan Club on November 17, 2000. The EP was a promotional release sent out to radio stations and record stores in early December, and began being played on radio on the 1st of December. The set was intended to build hype towards the release of the band's next self-titled album, Weezer (Green Album), which was released in May of the same year. In addition to the release, 1000 copies were sent to members of the Weezer Fan Club by their label, Geffen Records.

== Cover art ==
The cover art features the band members Rivers Cuomo, Brian Bell, Mikey Welsh, and Patrick Wilson dressed in Santa Claus costumes they had rented. The photos are stills taken from video captured by Weezer historian and webmaster Karl Koch on two dates, 15 and 31 November 2000, at Rivers Cuomo's house. Due to lack of file management, almost all of the original video and photographs are now lost.

== Winter Weezerland ==
The set was re-released in 2005 by Geffen Records via iTunes in 2005 under the title Winter Weezerland. The cover artwork features the same photograph used on the back of the Christmas CD. As of 2008, the EP is no longer available on iTunes.

== Track listing ==
All tracks are written by Rivers Cuomo.

No.	Title	Length
1.	"The Christmas Song"	3:11
2.	"Christmas Celebration"	2:24
Total length:		5:35

== Personnel ==
Personnel taken from Christmas CD booklet.

Weezer

- Rivers Cuomo – vocals, guitar
- Brian Bell – guitar, vocals
- Mikey Welsh – bass, vocals
- Patrick Wilson – drums

Production

- Weezer – production
- Neil Young – recording (track 1)
- Joe Barresi – recording (track 2)
- Chad Bamford – mixing
- Karl Koch – photography, art
