= The Good Life (Weezer song) =

1996 single

Single by Weezer

from the album Pinkerton
- B-side: "Waiting on You"; "I Just Threw Out the Love of My Dreams"
- Released: October 29, 1996
- Recorded: September 1995 – June 1996
- Genre: Alternative rock; power pop; emo
- Length: 4:17
- Label: DGC
- Songwriter: Rivers Cuomo
- Producer: Weezer

Weezer singles chronology
"El Scorcho" (1996)	"The Good Life" (1996)	"Hash Pipe" (2001)

Music video
- "The Good Life" on YouTube

Weezer EP chronology
The Good Life — OZ EP (1997)	Christmas CD (2001)

"The Good Life" is a song by the American rock band Weezer, released on October 29, 1996, as the second single from their second studio album, Pinkerton (1996). It was released as an EP in Australia. "The Good Life" was rush-released by the record company to try to save the failing album, but was not successful.

In the 2020s, the B-side "I Just Threw Out the Love of My Dreams", featuring the guest vocalist Rachel Haden, became popular on social media platform TikTok. "I Just Threw Out the Love of My Dreams" was certified gold in August 2026.

== Songs ==
In 1995, the Weezer songwriter, Rivers Cuomo, underwent a corrective operation for his leg and was in a leg brace. The brace was debilitatingly painful and inspired the lyrics to "The Good Life". The inside picture in the CD's booklet is an X-ray of Rivers' leg brace.

The B-side "I Just Threw Out the Love of My Dreams" was written for Weezer's unfinished rock opera Songs from the Black Hole. It describes a love affair between Jonas (sung by Cuomo) and Laurel (sung by Rachel Haden of That Dog). It was recorded in June 1996.

The live songs were taken from a set at Shorecrest High School near Seattle, which had won a contest and had Weezer perform during lunch in 1997. A young Daniel Brummel of Ozma can be seen in the upper right side of the EP cover.

== Music video ==
As Pinkerton was not meeting sales expectations, Weezer felt pressure to make a music video more to the liking of MTV. The "Good Life" video was directed by Jonathan Dayton and Valerie Faris and stars Mary Lynn Rajskub as a pizza delivery. It uses split screen angles appearing as a fractured full image. Geffen rush-released the video to try to save the album, but was not successful.

== Release ==
Professional ratings
Review scores
Source	Rating
AllMusic	4/5 stars

"The Good Life" was released at the behest of Weezer's record label, DGC. Pinkerton had not been as successful as Weezer's first album, and the single was not successful. Writing for AllMusic, Peter J. D'Angelo described the "Good Life" EP as "a great document of the group's late-'90s successes and a nice place to hear the many sides of the band in a single package".

In the 2020s, "I Just Threw Out the Love of My Dreams" became popular on the social media platform TikTok. According to Cuomo, "I Just Threw Out the Love of My Dreams" was receiving 100,000 streams a day as of 2022. It was certified gold on August 5, 2026. Weezer have performed "I Just Threw Out the Love of My Dreams" with guest vocalists including Blondshell, Snail Mail, and Momma's Etta Friedman and Allegra Weingarten.

== Track listing ==
Europe and Japan CD single

No.	Title	Length
1.	"The Good Life"	4:19
2.	"Waiting on You"	4:13
3.	"I Just Threw Out the Love of My Dreams"	2:39
Total length:		11:00

Australia EP

No.	Title	Length
1.	"The Good Life"	4:19
2.	"Waiting on You"	4:13
3.	"I Just Threw Out the Love of My Dreams"	2:39
4.	"The Good Life (Live Acoustic)"	4:40
5.	"Pink Triangle (Live Acoustic)"	4:26
Total length:		16:00

== Personnel ==
- Brian Bell – guitar, vocals
- Rivers Cuomo – vocals, guitar, piano, glockenspiel
- Matt Sharp – bass, vocals
- Patrick Wilson – drums
- Rachel Haden — vocals ("I Just Threw Out the Love of My Dreams")

== Charts ==
Chart performance for "The Good Life"
Chart (1997)	Peak position
Australia (ARIA)	88
US Alternative Airplay (Billboard)	32
