= Photograph (Weezer song) =

- Japanese single cover

Single by Weezer

from the album Weezer (The Green Album)
- Released: November 2001
- Recorded: December 2000
- Genre: Alternative rock; power pop
- Length: 2:19
- Label: Geffen
- Songwriter: Rivers Cuomo
- Producer: Ric Ocasek

Weezer singles chronology
"Island in the Sun" (2001)	"Photograph" (2001)	"Dope Nose" (2002)

Music video
- "Photograph" on YouTube

"Photograph" is a song by American alternative rock band Weezer. It is the third and final single from the band's self-titled third album, Weezer. "Photograph" was released as the first single off the album in Japan instead of "Hash Pipe". The song enjoyed only modest success on the radio, peaking at No. 17 on Billboard's Modern Rock Tracks chart.

During many live shows in 2005, the band would close out their first set by having Weezer drummer Patrick Wilson take lead vocals and guitar on "Photograph" while frontman Rivers Cuomo played drums.

== Music video ==
The music video for the song was directed by Weezer.com webmaster and longtime friend of the band Karl Koch. It consists of footage shot while the band was touring for the Green Album. Tenacious D briefly appears, running onstage during a Weezer show. Although Mikey Welsh plays bass and sings backup vocals on the studio recording, Shriner is in the video, as Welsh had left the band at that point. During the very end of the video, when Cuomo is playing the prank on Shriner, a demo of "Death & Destruction" can be heard in the background. The video is featured on Video Capture Device, the band's DVD.

== Reception ==
Stephen Thomas Erlewine of AllMusic thought that "Photograph" was one of the 4 highlights on the album.

Drowned in Sound writer Terry Bezer wrote: "'Photograph' is all 1950s happiness and brings back shades of 94's outstanding 'Buddy Holly'.

AXS thought that "Photograph" was the band's eighth best song.

== In other media ==
The song was played during the end credits for the 2008 comedy film, Drillbit Taylor.

The song was played in the Hung episode "A Man, a Plan".

== Track list ==
Radio Only Promo CD

1. "Photograph" (Radio Edit) – 2:12
2. "Photograph" (Video) – 2:20

Japan Retail CD

1. "Photograph" – 2:19
2. "Christmas Celebration" – 2:22

== Personnel ==
Taken from Weezer (Green Album) liner notes.

- Rivers Cuomo – vocals, guitar
- Patrick Wilson – drums
- Brian Bell – guitar, vocals
- Mikey Welsh – bass, vocals
