= Weezer (Green Album) =

2001 studio album by Weezer

Studio album by Weezer
- Released: May 15, 2001
- Recorded: December 2000
- Studios: Cello, Los Angeles
- Genres: Power pop; geek rock; alternative rock; pop-punk; pop rock
- Length: 28:23
- Label: Geffen
- Producer: Ric Ocasek

Weezer chronology
Christmas CD (2000)	Weezer (2001)	Maladroit (2002)

Singles from Weezer
- 1. "Hash Pipe" Released: April 2001; 2. "Island in the Sun" Released: July 16, 2001; 3. "Photograph" Released: November 2001

Weezer (also known as the Green Album) is the third studio album by American rock band Weezer. It was released on May 15, 2001, by Geffen Records. It was the second Weezer album produced by Ric Ocasek, who produced their debut album. It is the only studio album to feature bassist Mikey Welsh, who left a few months after its release due to health problems.

After the mixed critical reception and underwhelming sales of their second album, Pinkerton (1996), Weezer went on hiatus and the band members worked on side projects. During this time, their fanbase grew online and Pinkerton's standing improved. After a comeback performance at the Japanese Summer Sonic Festival, Weezer began rehearsing and recording new material. Following the ambitious compositions and confessional themes of Pinkerton, songwriter Rivers Cuomo wrote simpler songs with less personal lyrics.

Three singles were released from the album: "Hash Pipe", "Island in the Sun", and "Photograph". "Hash Pipe" was a worldwide hit, charting on seven different charts. Weezer received generally favorable reviews. It debuted at number four on the Billboard 200 and has sold more than 1.6 million copies.

== Background ==
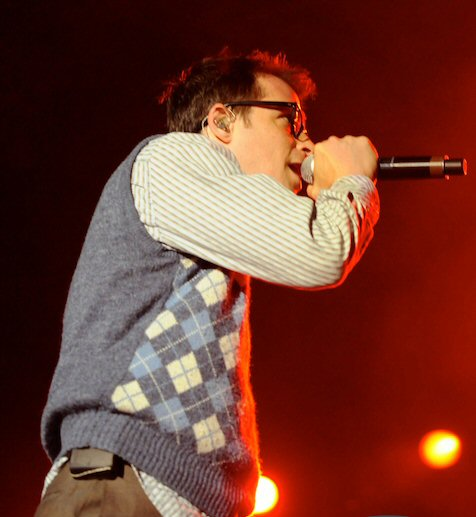
Rivers Cuomo (pictured in 2010) desired a back-to-basics approach in creating the album.

Weezer's second album, Pinkerton, was released on September 24, 1996. With a darker, more abrasive sound, it received mixed reviews and sold poorly compared to Weezer's 1994 debut. Following the Pinkerton tour, Weezer went on hiatus. Frontman Rivers Cuomo returned to Harvard University to finish his studies, but dropped out to focus on songwriting. During this time, he formed a new band, Homie.

By February 1998, Cuomo had disbanded Homie and headed to Los Angeles to begin work on Weezer demos with guitarist Brian Bell and drummer Patrick Wilson. Bassist Matt Sharp was absent from rehearsals and became estranged from the band. On April 8, 1998, Sharp announced his exit from Weezer to devote his energy to his band the Rentals. It was quickly announced that former Homie bassist Mikey Welsh would take over on bass for Weezer.

Frustration and creative disagreements led to a decline in rehearsals. In late 1998, Wilson left for his home in Portland pending renewed productivity from Cuomo. Cuomo became depressed; he painted the walls of his home black and put "fiberglass insulation all over the windows and then black sheets of fiberglass so that no light could get through". During this time, he isolated himself and abstained from contact with the outside world. He also had braces put on his teeth, further damaging his self-esteem.

By 1999, the members of Weezer had again gone their separate ways; Wilson resumed work with his band the Special Goodness, Bell worked on his band Space Twins and Welsh toured with Juliana Hatfield. Meanwhile, Cuomo wrote 121 songs, nearly half of which would become demos. Bell would occasionally visit Cuomo and play songs with him.

Unbeknownst to the band, their fanbase was connecting and growing on the internet, and Pinkerton's critical and commercial standing was improving. Weezer accepted a lucrative offer to perform in Japan in August 2000 for the Summer Sonic Festival; rehearsals for the show reinvigorated the band. They returned to performing in June 2000, playing low-key shows around Los Angeles under the pseudonym Goat Punishment, ensuring that Weezer would only perform for longtime fans who would recognize the name.

Eventually, Weezer performed higher-profile gigs such as the Warped Tour. Cuomo said: "We went in there fully expecting to be booed and to have things thrown at us. But it was exactly the opposite, people were singing along to all the songs and just going crazy, giving us the best support. And I think that gave us the confidence we needed." The response led to further shows. MP3 demos captured live on the band's mobile unit and soundchecks surfaced on file-sharing services and eventually were released as downloads on the Weezer website. These songs are often referred to as "Summer Songs of 2000".

== Recording ==
On October 23, 2000, Cuomo announced that Weezer would start recording material "with or without" a producer. However, their record label decided to have them employ a producer due to the failure of Pinkerton, which they had self-produced. Weezer began rehearsing and arranging both the Summer Songs of 2000 and newer material Cuomo had written at his home with engineer Chad Bamford. Weezer hired Ric Ocasek, who had produced their debut album, and began sending demos to him in mid-2000. There was much debate among the band members as to whether they should record in Los Angeles or Ocasek's New York home, and eventually recorded in Los Angeles at Cello Studios. They to demo new music daily and started to work through more than seventy-five demos, eventually homing in on twenty-five potential album tracks in anticipation of Ocasek's arrival. Ocasek worked with the band to trim these down further to eighteen songs.

After the mixed reception to Pinkerton, Cuomo wrote simpler songs with less personal lyrics. He said the songs were "very intentionally not about me. Not about what was going on in my life, at least in a conscious way." Recording sessions began in early December, with Ocasek providing feedback by telephone. On December 27, the band embarked on what would be close to six weeks of studio work by playing songs repetitively in order to track the bass and drums parts. They also did "scratch takes" of the vocals and guitar, designed to get accurate rhythm tracks before being redone more efficiently later in the recording process. While recording the album, the band continued to perform gigs under the pseudonym Goat Punishment.

During the recording sessions, an executive at the band's label, Geffen Records, visited to observe progress and expressed dissatisfaction with several tracks. This feedback eventually forced the band to discard a few songs. The band relocated for three weeks to a smaller studio in another part of Cello Studios where Cuomo and Bell worked on guitar takes while the entire band recorded vocal tracks. Ocasek said: "Rivers always does his guitar parts in one take." Mixing began on January 31 by Tom Lord-Alge at South Beach Studios inside the Marlin Hotel, Miami Beach, Florida.

== Packaging ==
"I set out to design the package exactly how I would want it, and it just turns out that it's very similar to the first album. I'm the same person as I was then, pretty much. I have the same taste so I don't see why it should be different."

— Rivers Cuomo discussing the artwork of Weezer.

Art direction was handled by Chris Bilheimer with photography from Marina Chavez and Karl Koch. It is similar to the cover art of Weezer's debut album.

The album cover was shot between band practices and featured Welsh, Cuomo, Bell and Wilson standing left to right in front of a plain, lime-green backdrop in a manner similar to the band's debut album. This was done as a tribute to Ric Ocasek, who had also produced their first album, and also to symbolize the band's back-to-basics approach they took while recording the album. This approach is alluded to in a quote in the liner notes of the album: "Torniamo all'antico e sarà un progresso", from Italian opera composer Giuseppe Verdi that means "Let us return to old times and that will be progress."

The picture inside of the CD booklet is a photo of Weezer playing live, featuring (in the lower right hand corner) an overlay of the silhouettes of Mike Nelson, Tom Servo and Crow T. Robot from the television show Mystery Science Theater 3000. (Hence the liner note citation "MST3K silhouette appears courtesy of Best Brains, Inc.")

This was Weezer's first album to feature a transparent CD tray. Under the CD tray of the album, the word "No" can be found on the back of the spine. Some fans speculate that this is a response to the inside tray of Radiohead's album OK Computer which contains the text "I like you. I like you. You are a wonderful person. I'm full of enthusiasm. I'm going places. I'll be happy to help you. I am an important person, would you like to come home with me?" Weezer's explanation was vague, with webmaster Karl Koch stating "No means no."

The album contains the dedication "In loving memory of Mykel and Carli." Mykel and Carli Allan were sisters devoted to developing fan clubs for up-and-coming bands. The sisters had been influential in starting and developing Weezer's official fan club in the 1990s and, along with their younger sister Trysta, died in a car crash in 1997.

== Promotion ==
The album was met with enthusiasm from the record label; according to Weezer collaborator Karl Koch, "They had nothing but supportive and excited things to say about it." However, the album's original release date of April 17 was postponed due to executives not liking Cuomo's choice of "Hash Pipe" as the first single. Citing the song's lurid content about a transvestite prostitute as inappropriate, they suggested that "Don't Let Go" be chosen as the first single. However, Cuomo continued to fight and "Hash Pipe" eventually became the album's first single. The label tried to postpone the release date further until June, but the band convinced them to adhere to the May 15 release date.

The video for "Hash Pipe" was directed by Marcos Siega and was the first of many Weezer videos directed by Siega. In the video, Weezer performs in an arena while a group of sumo wrestlers are fighting in the background. The song title was often censored as "H*** Pipe" (the title employed on the music video's title card) or "Half Pipe". The song became a hit on the MTV show Total Request Live and also received heavy rotation on radio, peaking at number two on the US Modern Rock Charts. The song was nominated for High Times magazine's "Pot Song of the Year".

The next single, "Island in the Sun", was a radio hit and became one of Weezer's biggest overseas hits. It peaked at number 11 on the US Modern Rock Charts and at number 31 on the UK Top 40. Two music videos were created for the song: the first video, directed by Marcos Siega, shows Weezer playing the song at a Mexican couple's wedding reception and features all four band members. The executives at MTV disliked Siega's video, prompting the band to film a second video.

After suffering a breakdown from the stress of touring, undiagnosed bipolar disorder, and drug abuse, Welsh attempted suicide and left Weezer in 2001. Without him, the band filmed a second video for "Island in the Sun", directed by Spike Jonze and featured the band playing with wild animals. Sharp may have been approached to be in the video. Scott Shriner, who was filling in for Welsh and later became a permanent member of Weezer, stated in the commentary for "Video Capture Device" that he almost asked the band to let him appear in the video. The second video received much wider airplay than the original and has become the standard video for the song.

The third and final single from the album was "Photograph", which was released to radio in early November. The single peaked at number 17 on the US Modern Rock Charts. In Japan it was released as the first single instead of "Hash Pipe." The band felt the song didn't have the staying power of the previous singles, and thus decided to pass on a big-name director for the music video, opting instead to have Karl Koch shoot and edit a video from on-the-road footage. It was the band's first music video featuring Shriner.

== Critical reception ==
Professional ratings
Aggregate scores
Source	Rating
Metacritic	73/100
Review scores
Source	Rating
AllMusic	4.5/5 stars
Drowned in Sound	9/10
Entertainment Weekly	B+
Houston Chronicle	4/5
The New Zealand Herald	4/5 stars
NME	5/10
Pitchfork	4.0/10
Q	4/5 stars
Rolling Stone	4/5 stars
Slant Magazine	3.5/5 stars

According to the review aggregator Metacritic, Weezer received "generally favorable reviews" based on a weighted average score of 73 out of 100 from 15 critic scores. Reviewing the album for Rolling Stone, Rob Sheffield wrote that the band had made "a totally crunk geek-punk record, buzzing through ten excellent tunes in less than half an hour with zero filler". AllMusic senior writer Stephen Thomas Erlewine wrote that while Weezer is essentially "just punk-pop, delivered without much dynamic range but with a whole lot of hooks", "nobody else" excels at the style as successfully as Weezer does on the album, which he felt ranked among the best rock records of 2001. Rolling Stone described the Green Album as the "anti-Pinkerton", with album art and "squeaky-clean" production that recalled Weezer's debut. The album was compared to the 1999 film Star Wars: Episode I – The Phantom Menace by Rob Mitchum of Pitchfork, who stated "Both sci-fi epic and alt-rock record were long-awaited events that had even the most jaded hipster hopping around like a small child with a full bladder."

Neva Chonin of the Houston Chronicle called it "a sublime selection of power-pop songs with enough lyrical ballast to keep them from floating away on their own euphoria". PopMatters critic Jason Thompson credited the band for their decision to have Ric Ocasek return as producer, as did Entertainment Weekly's Evan Serpick, who viewed the album as "a return to their winning formula of sugary power pop and smart-assed rants". Russell Bailie of The New Zealand Herald remarked that "the self-conscious nerd-factor of old seems largely and happily absent" on an album that "sounds like a revitalisation with a hint of maturity".

Writing in The A.V. Club, Stephen Thompson found that Weezer "feels a bit repetitive and perfunctory the first time through", but "nonetheless finds Weezer sounding revitalized in every way." Slant Magazine's Sal Cinquemani described it as "fillerless" and without "much to complain about", despite the lack of songs that "hit the spot" like the singles from Weezer's debut. Pitchfork critic Spencer Owen was more critical, finding the album "average from beginning to end" and lacking in the "sense of dynamics and intricacy that Pinkerton – and especially their debut – held in spades". Sarah Dempster from NME was similarly disappointed: "The most irritating aspect of the Green Album is... the maddening itch of wasted opportunity."

Weezer placed at number 21 on The Village Voice's year-end Pazz & Jop critics' poll for 2001. The album ranked at number 3 in Drowned in Sound's list of the best albums of 2001, while Spin named it the year's ninth best album. Q and Rolling Stone both listed it as one of the best albums of the year. Rolling Stone's Laura Marie Braun wrote in 2016 that the success of Weezer helped give Rivers Cuomo an "ego boost" after the initial lukewarm critical reception to Pinkerton, which in turn helped him reconcile his own conflicted feelings about that album.

== Sales ==
In the United States, Weezer debuted at number four on the Billboard 200 on the week of May 15, 2001, selling 215,000 copies. It was certified platinum by the Recording Industry Association of America (RIAA) on September 13, 2001. As of August 2009, the album has sold 1,600,000 copies in the United States. In Canada, the album debuted at number two on the Canadian Albums Chart. The album has been certified Platinum by the Canadian Recording Industry Association (CRIA) for 100,000 shipments.

The album debuted at number thirty-one on the UK Albums Chart. In Australia, the album peaked at number twenty-five. Weezer also peaked in the Top Ten in Norway at number eight.

== Track listing ==
All tracks are written by Rivers Cuomo.

No.	Title	Length
1.	"Don't Let Go"	3:00
2.	"Photograph"	2:19
3.	"Hash Pipe"	3:06
4.	"Island in the Sun"	3:20
5.	"Crab"	2:34
6.	"Knock-Down Drag-Out"	2:08
7.	"Smile"	2:38
8.	"Simple Pages"	2:56
9.	"Glorious Day"	2:40
10.	"O Girlfriend"	3:49
Total length:		28:23

Bonus tracks
No.	Title	Length
11.	"The Christmas Song" (Japanese issues)	3:08
12.	"I Do" (on UK and Japanese issues)	1:52
Total length:		33:28

== Personnel ==
Taken from the album liner notes.

Weezer

- Rivers Cuomo – lead vocals, guitar
- Brian Bell – guitar, vocals
- Mikey Welsh – bass, vocals
- Patrick Wilson – drums

Production

- Ric Ocasek – producer
- Ken Allardyce – engineer
- Femio Hernández – assistant engineer
- Carlos "Loco" Bedoya – assistant engineer
- Alan Sanderson – assistant engineer
- Vladimir Meller – mastering
- Tom Lord-Alge – mixing
- Atom Willard – drum technician
- Chris Bilheimer – art direction

== Charts ==
=== Weekly charts ===
Weekly chart performance for Weezer (Green Album)
Chart (2001)	Peak position
Australian Albums (ARIA)	25
Austrian Albums (Ö3 Austria)	15
Canadian Albums (Billboard)	2
Finnish Albums (Suomen virallinen lista)	22
French Albums (SNEP)	42
German Albums (Offizielle Top 100)	21
Japanese Albums (Oricon)	14
New Zealand Albums (RMNZ)	25
Norwegian Albums (VG-lista)	7
Scottish Albums (Official Charts)	21
Swedish Albums (Sverigetopplistan)	20
UK Albums (Official Charts)	31
US Billboard 200	4

=== Year-end charts ===
2001 year-end chart performance for Weezer (Green Album)
Chart (2001)	Position
Canadian Albums (Nielsen SoundScan)	51
US Billboard 200	83

2002 year-end chart performance for Weezer (Green Album)
Chart (2002)	Position
Canadian Alternative Albums (Nielsen SoundScan)	109

== Certifications ==
Certifications and sales for Weezer
Region	Certification	Certified units/sales
Canada (Music Canada)	Platinum	100,000^{^}
Japan (RIAJ)	Gold	100,000^{^}
New Zealand (RMNZ)	Gold	7,500^{‡}
United Kingdom (BPI)	Gold	100,000^{*}
United States (RIAA)	Platinum	1,000,000^{^}
^{*} Sales figures based on certification alone.^{^} Shipments figures based on certification alone.^{‡} Sales+streaming figures based on certification alone.
