= Maladroit =

Studio album by Weezer
- Released: May 14, 2002
- Recorded: December 2001–January 2002
- Studios: Cello, Los Angeles, California
- Genres: Geek rock; power pop; hard rock; alternative rock; emo
- Length: 33:43
- Label: Geffen
- Producer: Weezer

Weezer chronology
Weezer (2001)	Maladroit (2002)	The Lion and the Witch (2002)

Singles from Maladroit
- 1. "Dope Nose" Released: March 26, 2002; 2. "Keep Fishin'" Released: September 20, 2002

Maladroit is the fourth studio album by American rock band Weezer, released on May 14, 2002, by Geffen Records. It was self-produced by the band, and was their first album to feature bassist Scott Shriner, following the departure of former bassist Mikey Welsh in 2001, although Shriner was featured in the music video for "Photograph" from the band's previous album Weezer (also known as the Green Album). Musically, the album features a hard-rock sound and heavy metal riffs uncommon to Weezer's previous releases.

During the recording, Weezer would release demos every day on the band's website in an attempt to collect feedback from fans, although guitarist and vocalist Rivers Cuomo would often disagree with fans on most aspects of the album. The band's uploading also resulted in some radio stations playing the still unreleased songs.

Supported by the singles "Dope Nose" and "Keep Fishin'", Maladroit received positive reviews from critics and was ranked number 90 in a Rolling Stone readers' poll of top albums that year. The album debuted and peaked at number three on the Billboard 200, selling 152,000 copies its first week. As of 2022, the album has sold 605,000 copies in the United States and was certified Gold by the RIAA a month after its release.

== Background and recording ==
For the band's fourth studio album, Weezer attempted to incorporate an innovative system in which the group would release demos in MP3 format on the band's website every day while in the studio working on Maladroit. This resulted in dozens of different versions of over thirty different songs circulating on the Internet before the album was released.

The idea was to keep communication open with the band's fan base on the group's official message board as well as, more crucially, on unofficial message boards such as the Rivers Correspondent Board (which was closed to the public at frontman Rivers Cuomo's request, chiefly so that members of the press could not gain access). Yet Cuomo and the fans strongly disagreed on a number of creative aspects of the album. One thing they did agree on was bringing back the summer 2000 song "Slob" for use on the album. Cuomo commented, "I never would have thought to put the song "Slob" on the record if the fans did not request it." Bassist Scott Shriner also wanted a hidden track, "Are You Gonna Be?" for the album. Regardless of disagreements, Weezer fans are still "specially thanked" in the album's liner notes.

The band's uploading of MP3 demos onto its website resulted in some radio stations playing the still unreleased (and sometimes unfinished) songs. Due to a spat between Cuomo and the record label Geffen/Interscope, Weezer self-funded the recordings for Maladroit and the label was unaware of the recordings at all until the radio began to play them. It is said that Cuomo was so excited for fans to hear the music he personally mailed copies of 8 out of the 13 songs on Maladroit to key radio stations and press outlets. In the week it was leaked to radio stations, the lead single "Dope Nose" reached #25 on Billboard's Modern Rock Tracks chart without an official single having been issued.

The airplay resulted in a gag order being issued by Geffen Records in which they requested that Weezer return the master tapes from the Maladroit sessions and apologize to each radio station that played the song. The band members resisted, citing that they had funded all the sessions themselves and that apologizing seemed pointless. The fans resisted as well, forming an online group called "Unreleased Weezer for the Masses" that rallied for the release of the album.

The songs "Dope Nose" and "Hash Pipe" (off the Green Album) were both written using the same method on the same night, with Cuomo allegedly taking "a bunch of Ritalin and ... like three shots of tequila" and pacing around for a while before writing both songs.

== Title and packaging ==
The album title maladroit, meaning "awkward, clumsy, inept", was suggested by a board member on the Weezer message boards who went by the screen name of Lethe.

The album's first 600,000 copies were specifically numbered with the number located on the back of the CD case near the lower right-hand corner.

Maladroit was the first Weezer album to be released in the Enhanced CD format, which contained bonus videos including live and studio footage, as well as a video of drummer Patrick Wilson riding a skateboard down stadium ramps.

== Critical reception ==
Professional ratings
Aggregate scores
Source	Rating
Metacritic	72/100
Review scores
Source	Rating
AllMusic	4/5 stars
Blender	3/5 stars
Entertainment Weekly	C+
Los Angeles Times	3/4 stars
NME	8/10
Pitchfork	5.4/10
Q	4/5 stars
Rolling Stone	4/5 stars
Spin	7/10
The Village Voice	B−

According to the review aggregator Metacritic, Maladroit received "generally favorable reviews" based on a weighted average score of 72 out of 100 from 21 critic scores. Stephen Thomas Erlewine of AllMusic gave the album four stars, saying that it "retains the high quality of the Green Album". PopMatters gave the album an eight out of ten, saying "Maladroit keeps it short, keeps it simple, keeps it honest, but also importantly, they keep it coming. Thank Weezer for that." However, IGN later gave the album a score of five out of ten, and called it a "mixed bag", stating, "If you want to listen to a terrific Weezer cover band, proceed directly to Maladroit. Going by title alone, it's exactly as advertised. But, please, in the future, let's leave Weezer to their own devices. Ours aren't working."

Spin ended up calling it the 6th best album of 2002, and Rolling Stone readers voted it as the 8th best of the year. In another Rolling Stone readers poll, it was voted the 90th greatest album of all time.

In June 2009, Magnet had an article on the five most overrated and underrated Weezer songs. "All of Maladroit" was ranked number one on the list of the underrated half, where they comment "Maladroit, the band’s fourth album, is actually really good: not exactly deep, but it has some really stellar pop songs ... Sure, Maladroit never became a cultural touchstone the way the band’s first two albums did, but it deserves more credit than it ever got."

== Track listing ==
All tracks are written by Rivers Cuomo.

No.	Title	Length
1.	"American Gigolo"	2:42
2.	"Dope Nose"	2:16
3.	"Keep Fishin'"	2:52
4.	"Take Control"	3:05
5.	"Death and Destruction"	2:38
6.	"Slob"	3:08
7.	"Burndt Jamb"	2:39
8.	"Space Rock"	1:53
9.	"Slave"	2:53
10.	"Fall Together"	2:02
11.	"Possibilities"	2:00
12.	"Love Explosion"	2:35
13.	"December"	3:00
Total length:		33:40

Bonus tracks
No.	Title	Length
14.	"Living Without You" (on UK and Japanese issues)	2:49
15.	"Island in the Sun" (European and Australian bonus track)	3:20
Total length:		39:49

Enhanced CD video clips
No.	Title	Length
1.	"The Quiet Storm"	0:31
2.	"Dope Nose" (live)	1:03
3.	"Death and Destruction" (live)	1:01
4.	"Burndt Jamb" (live)	1:31
5.	"The Cobo Challenge"	1:52
6.	"Keep Fishin'" (live)	1:25
7.	"Take Control" (live)	0:57
Total length:		7:23

== Personnel ==
Personnel adapted from Maladroit liner notes

Weezer

- Rivers Cuomo – lead vocals, guitar, production
- Pat Wilson – drums, production
- Brian Bell – guitar, backing vocals, production
- Scott Shriner – bass guitar, backing vocals, production

Additional personnel

- Chad Bamford – additional production, engineer
- Rod Cervera – additional production
- Jordan Schur – executive producer
- Tom Lord-Alge – mixing
- Christopher Carroll – additional engineering
- Carlos "Loco" Bedoya – additional engineering
- Femio Hernández – assistant engineer
- Darren Mora – assistant engineer
- Steven P. Robillard – assistant engineer
- Stephen Marcussen – mastering
- Karl Koch – "Farm Hand"

== Charts ==
=== Weekly charts ===
Weekly chart performance for Maladroit
Chart (2002)	Peak position
Australian Albums (ARIA)	11
Austrian Albums (Ö3 Austria)	22
Canadian Albums (Billboard)	2
Dutch Albums (Album Top 100)	95
Finnish Albums (Suomen virallinen lista)	11
French Albums (SNEP)	42
German Albums (Offizielle Top 100)	29
Irish Albums (IRMA)	15
Norwegian Albums (VG-lista)	4
Swedish Albums (Sverigetopplistan)	22
Swiss Albums (Schweizer Hitparade)	44
UK Albums (Official Charts)	16
US Billboard 200	3

=== Year-end charts ===
Year-end chart performance for Maladroit
Chart (2002)	Position
Canadian Albums (Nielsen SoundScan)	126
Canadian Alternative Albums (Nielsen SoundScan)	39
US Billboard 200	167

== Certifications ==
Certifications for Maladroit
Region	Certification	Certified units/sales
United Kingdom (BPI)	Silver	60,000^{‡}
United States (RIAA)	Gold	500,000^{^}
^{^} Shipments figures based on certification alone.^{‡} Sales+streaming figures based on certification alone.
