= Pink Triangle (song) =

Promotional single by Weezer

from the album Pinkerton
- Released: May 20, 1997
- Recorded: September 1994 – June 1996
- Genre: Emo; grunge pop
- Length: 3:58
- Label: DGC
- Songwriter: Rivers Cuomo
- Producer: Weezer

"Pink Triangle" is a song by American rock band Weezer, released on their second album, Pinkerton (1996). It was released to radio as a promotional single on May 20, 1997, by DGC Records.

== Background ==
The song describes a man who falls in love with a woman with whom he imagines he could settle down and be married. However, he soon discovers that the woman of his affection is a lesbian who possibly thinks that the man himself is gay. The song is based on a real person that Weezer frontman Rivers Cuomo encountered while a student at Harvard, whom he fantasized a life with until he saw a pink triangle—a symbol used by the Nazis to label someone as gay which was later reappropriated as a symbol of LGBTQ+ liberation—on her sleeve. According to Cuomo, a year and a half after the album was released he discovered that the woman was actually not a lesbian and had just been showing support for the gay community.

In early 1997, "Pink Triangle" was selected as the third single from Pinkerton. DGC Records requested a remix of the song for radio, prompting a recording session at Fort Apache Studios. Bassist Matt Sharp was unable to attend the sessions, leading the band to recruit Scott Riebling as his replacement. The remixed single was sent to radio stations on a CD that also contained an acoustic version of the song recorded at Shorecrest High School in Seattle, Washington. The song received limited airplay and never charted and thus was deemed not to warrant a video. The planned commercial single was ultimately cancelled.

In 2004, the band released its first DVD Video Capture Device, which features a video of the Shorecrest performance as well as a video cut by Weezer.com webmaster and longtime friend of the band Karl Koch that features footage shot by Jennifer Wilson, wife of Weezer drummer Patrick Wilson.

== Composition ==
"Pink Triangle" is composed in the key of F♯ Major, however, has an unstable tempo, as the album was recorded without the use of a metronome.

The song opens with a glockenspiel and slide guitar, before breaking into the verse. The verses have a chord progression of vi-ii-V-I. After the chorus, there is an interlude of the opening riff. The overall song structure of Pink Triangle is verse-chorus form. The end of the song also transitions to the next song on the album, Falling for You.

The song, musically, has been described as emo and grunge pop.

== Reception ==
Mark Beaumont of NME ranked "Pink Triangle" as Weezer's fifth best song. Josh Modell of The A.V. Club considered the song to be "less successful—musically and emotionally" compared to other songs on Pinkerton.

== Track listing ==
Radio Station Promo CD

1. "Pink Triangle" (Remix) - 4:02
2. "Pink Triangle" (Live Acoustic) - 4:18

Live acoustic track is the same as on "The Good Life" OZ EP

== Personnel ==
Personnel taken from Pinkerton CD booklet.

- Brian Bell – guitar, vocals
- Rivers Cuomo – vocals, guitar
- Matt Sharp – bass, vocals (album version)
- Patrick Wilson – drums

Additional musicians

- Scott Riebling – bass (remix version)
