= Karl Koch (Weezer assistant) =

Assistant to the band Weezer

- Koch in front of his record collection in 2006
- Born: Karl Michael Koch; September 15, 1969 (age 57); Buffalo, New York, U.S.
- Other name: Karlophone
- Occupation: Assistant for Weezer
- Years active: 1991–present
- Website: karlophone.com

Karl Michael Koch (September 15, 1969) is a general assistant to American rock band Weezer and "unofficial fifth member" of the ensemble.

Since the band's inception he has assumed multiple different roles, including roadie, concert photographer, webmaster, social media manager, archivist, historian, and art director. Drummer Patrick Wilson said in 2005, "[the band] wouldn't be here if it wasn't for Karl."

Koch established and operates Weezer's official website and social media pages, on which he publishes his band news column Karl's Corner. The band's early adoption of the internet, spearheaded by Koch, is cited as a reason for their return to popularity after the hiatus that followed Pinkerton. Entertainment publications frequently utilize Koch's insider knowledge and photography (directly or via Karl's Corner) when writing about the band.

In addition to his work with Weezer, Koch releases his own music under the moniker Karlophone and has worked closely with Wilson's band The Special Goodness.

== Work with Weezer ==
=== Prior to the band's formation ===
Koch first met future Weezer drummer Patrick Wilson in early 1990 while living in Buffalo, New York; the two were introduced through Pat Finn, a musician and friend of Koch's. Wilson and Finn moved to Los Angeles, California to pursue the city's music scene, urging Koch to follow. The following year Koch flew out to Finn's L.A. apartment, where he was introduced to future Weezer members Matt Sharp, Jason Cropper, and Rivers Cuomo. When this group of musicians coalesced into the short-lived band 60 Wrong Sausages, Koch provided general assistance and documented their activity. Some footage taped and archived by Koch from this era would later appear on the Weezer DVD Video Capture Device.

=== 1992–1999: The "Blue Album" and Pinkerton ===
After Weezer's proper formation in February 1992, Koch remained a consistent crew member and assistant. Lead singer Rivers Cuomo has explained, "he's the one who took us to our shows, and helped us carry our gear, and set everything up, and tune our guitars, and draw our fliers, and give us tons of artistic advice and moral support." Koch illustrated the first iteration of the band's logo and managed early merchandise production during this period. After the band was signed to Geffen Records in 1993, Koch accompanied the band to New York for the recording of the Blue Album, working per diem. Koch shot footage of the album's recording sessions, which would later comprise the "Making of the Blue Album" chapter of Video Capture Device. He is credited on the final release of the album for visual design work.

Early iterations of the Blue Album single "Undone – The Sweater Song" – including the recording included on the band's third demo tape – featured dense collages of sampled audio produced by Koch. To avoid licensing issues, these were replaced on the album with spoken word segments performed by Koch, Matt Sharp, and fan club co-founder Mykel Allen. On the 2026 compilation album 1192, which features remastered recordings and new takes from Weezer's third demo sessions, Koch's original sound collages were partially retained.

When the music video for the single "Buddy Holly" won the MTV Video Music Award for Best Alternative Video in 1995, Koch and Pat Finn stood in on-stage for missing band members Cuomo and Wilson.

While conceiving Songs from the Black Hole (an ultimately unreleased rock opera which evolved into the 1996 album Pinkerton), Rivers Cuomo envisioned Koch performing the role of the sentient robot character "M1". Koch was among the few individuals who had access to the album's drafts before its songs and story were officially published, and acted as a primary source of information about the album for fans in the 2000s. On "Butterfly", the final track on Pinkerton, Koch's drumming accompanies Cuomo's acoustic performance.

==== Karl's Corner and website management ====
People like Karl Koch bring you directly next to the band on a daily basis. I have about 500 pictures of the guys doing things that I do with my friends every day.

— Andrew Naiffy, Chicago Tribune, "NOTHING BUT NET", 2001

Merlin Mann: "Is it Karl that does your website, does he still do that?"

Patrick Wilson: "Absolutely."

Mann: "I remember you guys being in front of this stuff a really long time ago ... It seems like you guys have been pretty connected with your fans from early on, and I remember that being ... one of the first comprehensive sites I remember that was actually kinda sanctioned by the band."

— MacBreak Weekly episode 82, "The Double Album", 2008

During 1995–1998, Koch wrote a column titled Karl's Corner for Weezine, the quarterly print zine issued by the band's official fan club. After the passing of fan club founders Mykel and Carli Allen, Koch became the lead editor and contributor to the zine.

In late 1999, Koch re-focused fan involvement efforts from the (then-shuttered) fan club to the official Weezer website, weezer.net (later weezer.com). He used the website to document and share exclusive information and media pertaining to the band. In January 2000, it also became a new home for the Karl's Corner column. Updated multiple times a week, the online column featured news about touring and recording, updates on the band's day-to-day activity, and photographs shot by Koch. Questions or fan accounts sent via email were often incorporated into Koch's updates, encouraging participation and involvement in the Weezer fandom. By July 2000, the page had received over nine million views. Brad Cawn of the Chicago Tribune cited Koch's management of the website and the Karl's Corner column as a contributing factor behind the band's resurgence in popularity in the early 2000s, overcoming a decline caused by the commercial underperformance of their 1996 album Pinkerton and the hiatus that followed.

=== 2000–2009: Touring and music videos ===
At the onset of the 2000s, Koch established a number of consistent roles within the band: photographing and summarizing Weezer performances on Karl's Corner (alongside other website maintenance), assisting with design work for merchandise and music releases, and giving general input on band decisions.

Koch directed the official music video for the band's 2001 single "Photograph". He also starred in the 2005 video for "Perfect Situation", playing himself.

The band's DVD Video Capture Device: Treasures from the Vault 1991–2002, directed and edited by Koch, was released in 2004. It includes released and unreleased music videos (some directed by Koch) and miscellaneous footage shot by Koch over the years. In the same year, Koch authored an essay chronicling the development of the Blue Album for the release of its deluxe edition, although it was ultimately not included with the CD.

Koch served as a source of firsthand information and photographs for entertainment news outlets when, in 2009, the band suffered a bus crash during an ongoing tour.

=== 2010–present: Memories Tour, revival of fan club, and "VIP experience" ===
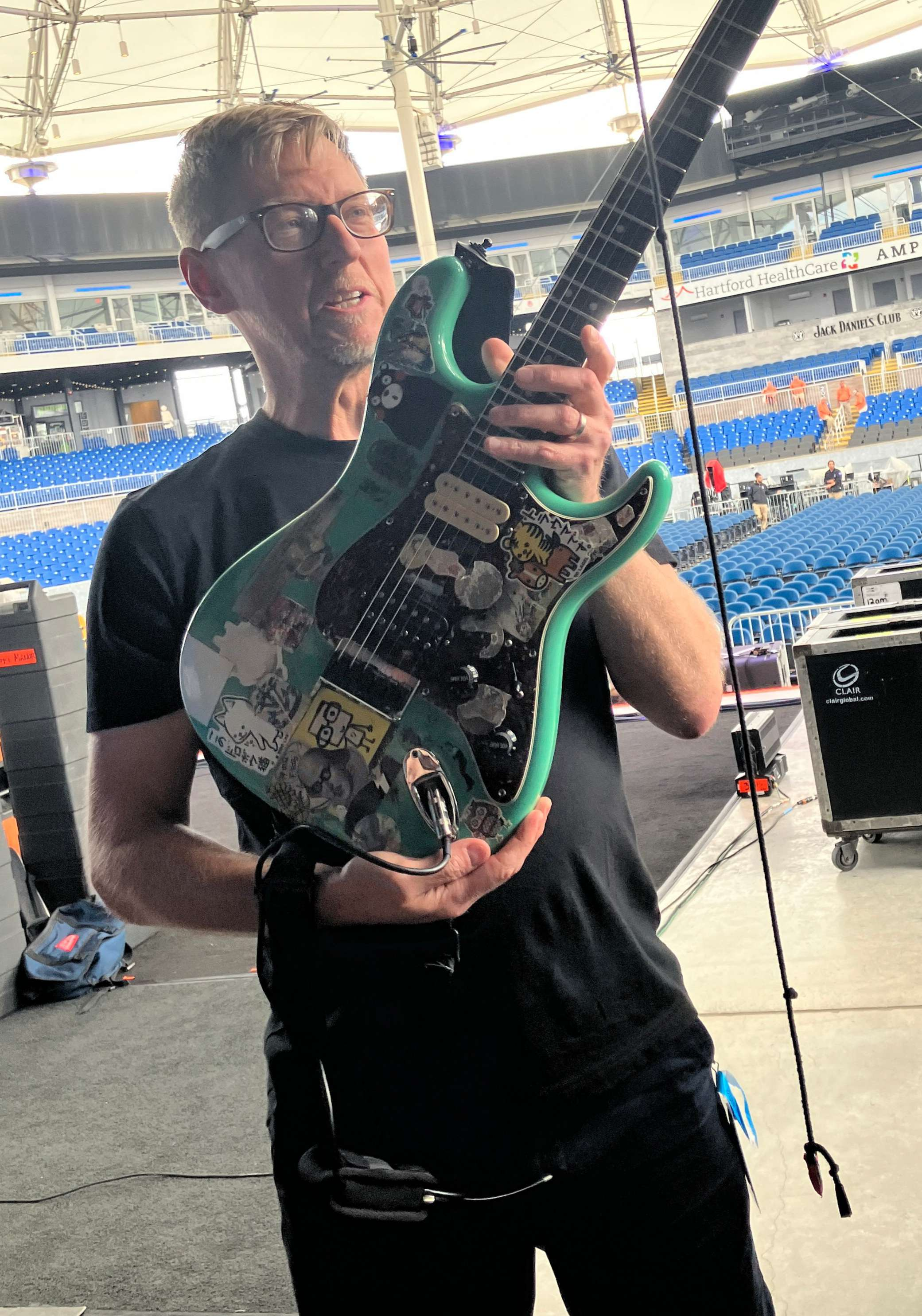
Koch showcasing the stratocaster used by Rivers Cuomo during a "VIP Experience" before a concert in 2023.

For Weezer's Memories Tour in 2010, Koch gave special presentations featuring band artifacts and insider information during mid-show intermissions. He also reprised his drumming on the Pinkerton song "Butterfly". As he had for the Blue Album, Koch wrote an in-depth essay on the development of Pinkerton for its deluxe edition release in the same year. This essay was included in the release's booklet.

In 2014, the official Weezer Fan Club was revived by Koch and a fan named Lisa, who have continued running it through the present day. Koch additionally hosts the fan-maintained wiki Weezerpedia, which has been described by one contributor as "an extension of [his] massive efforts archiving Weezer".

For the band's 2018 tour with the Pixies, Koch hosted the "Karl's Corner VIP experience" for VIP ticket holders, wherein fans could meet Koch and view a small museum of unique Weezer merchandise and ephemera from his archive. The band offered the same experience during subsequent tours.

== Other projects ==
=== Karlophone ===
In 1996, Koch formed the experimental sound collage project Karlophone. His music, inspired by contemporary hip hop and producers such as DJ Shadow, was constructed of layered audio samples from records, films, and reels in his large personal collection, with added instrumentation. He released his first album, Press Any Key to Begin, in fall 2002. Alex Steininger of In Music We Trust reviewed the album positively, describing it as "one part hip-hop, one part electronica, one part rock, and seven parts experimental wanderings."

Amid his work with Weezer between 2002 and 2006, Koch produced his second studio album I Must Find This Karlophone..., which he released in 2007. A third album began production immediately following the second's release, but has yet to be completed as of 2023.

=== The Special Goodness ===
The Special Goodness is the band of Weezer drummer Patrick Wilson, also formed in 1996. As with Weezer, Koch followed the development of Wilson's band, documented its history, and roadied on its tours.

In 2022, Koch co-hosted The Special Podness — a four episode podcast retrospective on The Special Goodness — with Wilson and former member Atom Willard.

== Personal life ==
Koch was born in Buffalo, New York on September 15, 1969. He attended Nichols School and graduated from the Maryland Institute College of Art in Baltimore, Maryland in 1991.

Koch is the great-grandson of Ehrhardt Koch, founder of the New Era Cap Company, and brother of its current CEO Chris Koch. Koch is cited as a "New Era historian" in Jim Lilliefors' book Ball Cap Nation and portrayed his great-grandfather in a 2012 advertisement for the company. Both sides of his family are of German descent.

== Works ==
=== Discography ===
==== As Karlophone ====
- 2001 – Press Any Key to Begin
- 2007 – I Must Find this Karlophone...

==== With Southern Fried Swing ====
- 2001 – Free Flight Thru the Universe of Sound

==== With Weezer/Rivers Cuomo (including non-musical contributions) ====
- 1994 – Weezer (Blue Album) (design)
- 1996 – Pinkerton (uncredited drumming on "Butterfly")
- 2001 – Christmas CD (photography, artwork)
- 2001 – Weezer (Green Album) (photography)
- 2002 – The Lion and the Witch (photography)
- 2002 – Maladroit (photography)
- 2005 – Make Believe (photography)
- 2007 – Alone: The Home Recordings of Rivers Cuomo (photography)
- 2008 – Weezer (Red Album) (photography)
- 2008 – Alone II: The Home Recordings of Rivers Cuomo (design)
- 2010 – Death to False Metal (photography)
- 2026 – 1192 (photography, samples on "Undone - The Sweater Song")
- 2026 – Weezer (Gold Album) (songwriting on "The Show Must Go On")

Following the Blue Album, Koch is credited on every Weezer album (and the SZNZ EPs) under nonsense titles (e.g., "Boot Knocka" on the Green Album), alongside any other visual or technical role.

=== Filmography ===
- Weezer – Video Capture Device: Treasures from the Vault 1991–2002 (2004)

=== Books ===
- Raditude (2009) – not to be confused with the album of the same name
- Weezine Omnibus (2014)
- Weezine Omnibus: Deluxe Edition (2016)
- Tales of Weezer (2021)

== See also ==
- Fifth Beatle – popular term describing unofficial "fifth members" of the British rock band the Beatles
- Road crew
- Fan club
