= Dope Nose =

Single by Weezer

from the album Maladroit
- Released: March 25, 2002
- Genre: Rock; power pop
- Length: 2:16
- Label: Geffen
- Songwriter: Rivers Cuomo
- Producer: Weezer

Weezer singles chronology
"Photograph" (2001)	"Dope Nose" (2002)	"Keep Fishin'" (2002)

Music video
- "Dope Nose" on YouTube

"Dope Nose" is a song by American rock band Weezer. It is the first single off the band's fourth album, Maladroit. It was officially released in March 2002, though it had been performed live and in the studio during the band's 2000 summer tour comeback after hiatus. During various live shows, Weezer bassist Scott Shriner sometimes performs lead vocals on the song.

== Background ==
Frontman Rivers Cuomo wrote the song on the same night he wrote "Hash Pipe", after drinking three shots of tequila and a Ritalin.

== Music video ==
Director Michel Gondry wrote a treatment for a "Dope Nose" music video. The video would feature the members of Weezer playing a game of soccer against a Mexican heavy metal band. Though the band rejected the treatment, it is still available in written form on Gondry's Directors Label DVD. The song's official music video was directed by Marcos Siega and features the Japanese motorcycle gang culture of Bōsōzoku.

== Charts ==
=== Weekly charts ===
Chart (2002)	Peak position
US Alternative Airplay (Billboard)	8

=== Year-end charts ===
Chart (2002)	Position
US Modern Rock Tracks (Billboard)	55
