= Island in the Sun (Weezer song) =

2001 single by Weezer

- Australian variant of one of the single's standard retail artworks

Single by Weezer

from the album Weezer (Green Album)
- B-side: "Oh, Lisa"; "Always"; "Sugar Booger"; "Brightening Day"
- Released: July 16, 2001
- Studio: Cello (Los Angeles)
- Genre: Alternative rock; power pop
- Length: 3:20
- Label: Geffen
- Songwriter: Rivers Cuomo
- Producer: Ric Ocasek

Weezer singles chronology
| "Hash Pipe" (2001) | "Island in the Sun" (2001) | "Photograph" (2001) |

Music video
- "Island in the Sun" (Marcos Siega version) on YouTube
- "Island in the Sun" (Spike Jonze version) on YouTube

"Island in the Sun" is a song by the American rock band Weezer. It was released as the second single from the band's third album, Weezer, in July 2001; in Australia, it served as the lead single, as "Hash Pipe" was not released there. The song was not originally planned to be on the album, but producer Ric Ocasek fought for its inclusion. The song also appears as a bonus track on the European and Australian versions of Weezer's follow-up album, Maladroit.

"Island in the Sun" was successful worldwide, peaking at number 11 on the US Billboard Modern Rock Tracks chart, reaching number 17 in France, and entering the top 40 in Canada and the United Kingdom. In Australia, where the song peaked at number 78, it was ranked number seven on the Triple J Hottest 100 poll of 2001. In 2009, Pitchfork named it the 495th-greatest song of the 2000s.

In late 2001, the band reworked the song's solo for their live show. In 2005, lead singer Rivers Cuomo would often open the band's encore by playing "Island in the Sun" alone on an acoustic guitar from the rear of the venue.

== Composition ==
"Island in the Sun" is an alternative rock and power pop song that is about three minutes and 20 seconds. According to the sheet music published at Musicnotes.com by Hal Leonard Music, it is written in the time signature of common time, with a moderate tempo of 114 beats per minute. The sheet music shows a key of G major, while the vocal range spans just over an octave, from the low note of F♯_{3} to the high note of G_{4}.

== Reception ==
Melissa Bobbitt of About.com ranked "Island in the Sun" as the 12th best Weezer song, saying it "exemplified a relaxed Southern California spirit". It was named as one of the 12 best post-Pinkerton Weezer songs by The A.V. Club, where they refer to it as "...a reminder that Cuomo really does deserve Brian Wilson comparisons for reasons beyond being a hermetic weirdo with a solid grasp of pop songcraft". On the other hand, Emily Tartanella of Magnet considered it to be the most overrated Weezer song, stating it should be "retired" from commercials and radio stations. Tartanella described it as "so laid back it's practically catatonic".

== Music videos ==
There are two different videos for "Island in the Sun".

=== Version 1: Mexican wedding ===
This video was directed by Marcos Siega. It shows Weezer playing the song at a Mexican couple's wedding reception, and features all four band members. The groom in the video is played by actor/singer Tony Garcia. It was the last video to feature bassist Mikey Welsh.

=== Version 2: Animals ===
This video was directed by Spike Jonze. It features Weezer playing with various wild animals on a hill. Only Brian Bell, Rivers Cuomo, and Pat Wilson appear in this video, as bassist Mikey Welsh had left the band shortly before shooting.

== Track listings ==
UK CD1
| No. | Title | Length |
|---|---|---|
| 1. | "Island in the Sun" | 3:20 |
| 2. | "Oh, Lisa" | 2:45 |
| 3. | "Always" | 2:05 |
| 4. | "Island in the Sun" (CD-ROM video) |

UK CD2
| No. | Title | Length |
|---|---|---|
| 1. | "Island in the Sun" | 3:20 |
| 2. | "Sugar Booger" | 3:40 |
| 3. | "Brightening Day" | 2:11 |

UK limited-edition 7-inch yellow vinyl single
| No. | Title | Length |
|---|---|---|
| 1. | "Island in the Sun" | 3:20 |
| 2. | "Always" | 2:05 |

Japanese CD single
| No. | Title | Length |
|---|---|---|
| 1. | "Island in the Sun" | 3:20 |
| 2. | "Teenage Victory Song" | 3:05 |
| 3. | "Starlight" | 3:19 |

An erroneous short mix of "Always" ended up on the singles, and the correct mix (2:48) was released as an MP3 on the band's website.

== Personnel ==
Personnel are taken from the Weezer liner notes.

- Rivers Cuomo – vocals, guitar
- Patrick Wilson – drums
- Brian Bell – guitar, vocals
- Mikey Welsh – bass, vocals

== Charts ==
=== Weekly charts ===
| Chart (2001–2002) | Peak position |
|---|---|
| Australia (ARIA) | 78 |
| Belgium (Ultratip Bubbling Under Wallonia) | 9 |
| Canada (Nielsen SoundScan) | 40 |
| Canada Radio (Nielsen BDS) | 42 |
| Europe (Eurochart Hot 100) | 55 |
| France (SNEP) | 17 |
| New Zealand (Recorded Music NZ) | 47 |
| Scottish Singles Sales (Official Charts) | 30 |
| UK Singles (Official Charts) | 31 |
| UK Rock & Metal (Official Charts) | 5 |
| US Bubbling Under Hot 100 (Billboard) | 11 |
| US Adult Alternative Airplay (Billboard) | 8 |
| US Adult Pop Airplay (Billboard) | 33 |
| US Alternative Airplay (Billboard) | 11 |

| Chart (2008) | Peak position |
|---|---|
| US Digital Song Sales (Billboard) | 57 |

| Chart (2021) | Peak position |
|---|---|
| Canada (Nielsen SoundScan) | 17 |

=== Year-end charts ===
| Chart (2001) | Position |
|---|---|
| US Modern Rock Tracks (Billboard) | 43 |

| Chart (2002) | Position |
|---|---|
| France (SNEP) | 95 |
| US Triple-A (Billboard) | 48 |

== Certifications ==
| Region | Certification | Certified units/sales |
|---|---|---|
| Italy (FIMI) | Gold | 50,000^{‡} |
| New Zealand (RMNZ) | 4× Platinum | 120,000^{‡} |
| Spain (Promusicae) | Gold | 30,000^{‡} |
| United Kingdom (BPI) | Platinum | 600,000^{‡} |
| United States (RIAA) | 7× Platinum | 7,000,000^{‡} |
^{‡} Sales+streaming figures based on certification alone.

== Release history ==
| Region | Date | Format(s) | Label(s) | Ref. |
|---|---|---|---|---|
| United States | July 16, 2001 | Triple A radio | Geffen | |
| United States | July 17, 2001 | Mainstream rock; active rock; alternative radio | Geffen | |
| Australia | October 22, 2001 | CD | Geffen | |
| United Kingdom | October 22, 2001 | 7-inch vinyl; CD | Geffen | |
| Japan | October 24, 2001 | CD | Geffen | |
