= Hash Pipe =

2001 single by Weezer

Single by Weezer

from the album Weezer (The Green Album)
- B-side: "I Do"; "Starlight"; "Teenage Victory Song"
- Released: April 17, 2001
- Studio: Cello (Los Angeles)
- Genre: Hard rock; power pop
- Length: 3:06
- Label: Geffen
- Songwriter: Rivers Cuomo
- Producer: Ric Ocasek

Weezer singles chronology
"The Good Life" (1997)	"Hash Pipe" (2001)	"Island in the Sun" (2001)

Music video
- "Hash Pipe" on YouTube

"Hash Pipe" is a song by American rock band Weezer. Released in April 2001, it was the first single from the band's third album, Weezer (The Green Album). The song reached number two on the US Billboard Modern Rock Tracks chart and charted within the top 40 in Canada, Ireland, and the United Kingdom.

== Background ==
According to an interview with Weezer frontman Rivers Cuomo, "Hash Pipe" was written on the same night as the song "Dope Nose" from the next studio album, Maladroit. The story goes that Cuomo took "a bunch of Ritalin and had like three shots of tequila," paced around for a while, then wrote both songs. Also according to Cuomo, he had intended on giving this song to Ozzy Osbourne in 2000 after he approached Cuomo for song ideas, but he did not use it. Weezer drummer Patrick Wilson is featured on the cover of the song's CD single. Since late 2001, the band has played the song live with a reworked guitar solo that no longer follows the verse melody.

== Composition ==
With a tempo of 128 bpm, "Hash Pipe" is composed in the key of A minor. The opening line, "I can't help my feelings, I go out of my mind", is quoted from the Beatles' "You Can't Do That".

== Reception ==
The song was met with positive reviews by music critics. AllMusic writer Stephen Thomas Erlewine chose "Hash Pipe" as one of the four highlights from the album. Paul Brannigan of Kerrang! awarded the single 5 stars and named it "Single of the Week". Slant Magazine writer Sal Cinquemani wrote that the song "is further evidence of the band's punk rock origins, with its crunchy guitar licks and sticcato (sic) vocals scorched with the residual edge leftover from the alt-rock boom". In 2014, ticketing company AXS rated it as the band's seventh best song.

== Music video ==
The video for the song was directed by Marcos Siega, the first of many Weezer videos that Siega would direct. In the video, Weezer is shown playing while a group of sumo wrestlers are standing in the background. As the song progresses, the wrestlers are shown wrestling and during the guitar solo, the wrestlers play the band members' instruments as the members watch from the background. During the final chorus, guitarist Brian Bell performs a move in which he bends backwards, taking the guitar with him, then thrusts his legs in the way he's bending. This move has become known among Weezer fans as "the impossible bend". According to the mini book that accompanies the Video Capture Device DVD, Siega was asked to avoid referring to the lyrics of the song for the video, due to its themes of homosexual prostitution and drug references.

== Track listings ==
US 7-inch and CD single

1. "Hash Pipe" – 3:06
2. "I Do" – 2:10

UK CD

1. "Hash Pipe" – 2:51
2. "Starlight" – 3:35
3. "Hash Pipe" (Jimmy Pop remix)
4. "Hash Pipe" (CD-ROM video)

UK 7-inch single

1. "Hash Pipe" – 2:52
2. "Teenage Victory Song" – 3:11

European maxi-CD single

1. "Hash Pipe" – 3:06
2. "I Do" – 1:53
3. "Starlight" – 3:21
4. "Hash Pipe" (Jimmy Pop remix) – 3:22

== Charts ==
=== Weekly charts ===
Weekly chart performance for "Hash Pipe"
Chart (2001)	Peak position
Canada (Nielsen SoundScan)	16
Canada Radio (Nielsen BDS)	32
Canada Rock (Nielsen BDS)	3
Ireland (IRMA)	37
Netherlands (Single Top 100)	74
Scottish Singles Sales (Official Charts)	15
UK Singles (Official Charts)	21
US Bubbling Under Hot 100 (Billboard)	6
US Alternative Airplay (Billboard)	2
US Mainstream Rock (Billboard)	24

=== Year-end charts ===
2001 year-end chart performance for "Hash Pipe"
Chart (2001)	Position
Canada (Nielsen SoundScan)	80
US Modern Rock Tracks (Billboard)	6

2002 year-end chart performance for "Hash Pipe"
Chart (2002)	Position
Canada (Nielsen SoundScan)	124

== Certifications ==
Certiciations for "Hash Pipe"
Region	Certification	Certified units/sales
New Zealand (RMNZ)	Gold	15,000^{‡}
United Kingdom (BPI)	Silver	200,000^{‡}
United States (RIAA)	2× Platinum	2,000,000^{‡}
^{‡} Sales+streaming figures based on certification alone.

== Release history ==
Release dates and formats for "Hash Pipe"
Region	Date	Format(s)	Label(s)	Ref.
United States	April 17, 2001	Alternative radio	Geffen	
United Kingdom	July 2, 2001	7-inch vinyl; CD; cassette	Geffen	

== Other versions ==
Rock band Toto started covering the song live in 2018, before releasing it as a digital single, in response to Weezer's well-received version of their own hit song "Africa".
