= El Scorcho =

1996 single by Weezer

Single by Weezer

from the album Pinkerton
- B-side: "You Gave Your Love to Me Softly"; "Devotion"
- Released: September 10, 1996
- Recorded: September 1995 – June 1996
- Genre: Alternative rock; power pop; rap rock; emo
- Length: 4:03
- Label: DGC
- Songwriter: Rivers Cuomo
- Producer: Weezer

Weezer singles chronology
"Say It Ain't So" (1995)	"El Scorcho" (1996)	"The Good Life" (1996)

Music video
- "El Scorcho" on YouTube

"El Scorcho" is a song by the American rock band Weezer. It is the first single from the band's second album, Pinkerton, released in 1996. The music video features the band playing in an old ballroom in Los Angeles (as revealed by Weezer's Video Capture Device DVD), surrounded by light fixtures of diverse origin, flashing in time to the music. The name of the song supposedly came from a packet of hot sauce from Del Taco, labeled "Del Scorcho".

The track failed commercially; several radio stations refused to play the song, and the video was not played on MTV. This is considered to be one of the causes for Pinkerton's initial commercial failure.

The single was, however, extremely popular in Australia, and made it to #9 on the Triple J Hottest 100 chart for 1996, the national poll conducted by alternative rock station Triple J for the year's most popular alternative songs. It was subsequently released on the 1996 Triple J Hottest 100 compilation album.

The song is available as a downloadable track for the video game series Rock Band.

== Background and writing ==
Lead singer Rivers Cuomo mentioned in a 2006 interview with the Harvard college newspaper, The Crimson, that the lines mentioning "Cio-Cio San" and "watching Grunge leg-drop New Jack" were actually taken from an essay from a classmate of his at Harvard in an Expository Writing class. The printed lyrics to the song identify these two lines as quoted with the enclosure of quotation marks: "...one example is, in 'Pinkerton,' in 'El Scorcho,' two lines in the song are actually taken from someone else's essay in my Expos class. Because at one point, we had to do a little workshop thing, and we each got assigned to review someone else's essay. So, I reviewed this one person's essay, and I liked some of the lines in it, so I took them and used them in the song."

== Cultural references ==
The line "listening to Cio-Cio San" is in reference to Puccini's opera Madame Butterfly, referring to a Japanese girl named Cio-Cio San, one of the main characters.

== Music video ==
For the single, Cuomo refused to make any "Buddy Holly"-like videos, explaining "I really want the songs to come across untainted this time around...I really want to communicate my feelings directly and because I was so careful in writing that way. I'd hate for the video to kinda misrepresent the song, or exaggerate certain aspects." The final video featured the band playing in an assembly hall in Los Angeles, surrounded by light fixtures of diverse origin, flashing in time to the music. Matt Sharp appears wearing a FC Barcelona shirt. At the beginning of the video, a neon sign reads "Weerez", although at the end, it reads Weezer. It debuted on MTV's program 120 Minutes and only received moderate airplay on the channel. Mark Romanek directed the video. Patrick Wilson was critical of the video, calling it a "lame concept" and saying too much money was spent on it.

== Track listing ==
All tracks written by Rivers Cuomo.

UK 7" Single/UK CD #1

1. "El Scorcho" – 4:03
2. "You Gave Your Love to Me Softly" – 1:57

UK CD #2

1. "El Scorcho" – 4:03
2. "You Gave Your Love to Me Softly" – 1:57
3. "Devotion" – 3:11

AU CD

1. "El Scorcho" – 4:03
2. "You Gave Your Love to Me Softly" – 1:57
3. "Devotion" – 3:11

"You Gave Your Love to Me Softly" was recorded for and released on the soundtrack to the film Angus. This version is a completely new recording.

== Personnel ==
- Rivers Cuomo – vocals, guitar, organ
- Patrick Wilson – drums
- Brian Bell – guitar, vocals
- Matt Sharp – bass, vocals

== Charts ==
Weekly chart performance for "El Scorcho"
Chart (1996)	Peak position
Australia (ARIA)	70
Canada Rock/Alternative (RPM)	5
Finland (Suomen virallinen lista)	18
Japan (Japan Hot 100)	73
Sweden (Topplistan)	10
UK Singles (Official Charts)	50
US Alternative Airplay (Billboard)	19

== Certifications ==
Certifications for "Troublemaker"
Region	Certification	Certified units/sales
United States (RIAA)	Gold	500,000^{‡}
^{‡} Sales+streaming figures based on certification alone.

== Covers ==
- Actor Michael Cera's band The Long Goodbye has covered the song.
- Manchester Orchestra recorded a cover of it for their podcast series.
- Chilean band Los Miserables in their album "Date Cuenta" made a cover called "Chow Chow Sen" inspired by the song El Scorcho.
- The Stereo also covered the song on the Weezer tribute album Rock Music: A Tribute to Weezer.
- Mashup artists The Hood Internet paired the song with Drake's single "Best I Ever Had" to create the mashup entitled "El Besto I Ever Had".
- The band Brand New covered this song in Philadelphia, PA in July 2009.
- Punk/indie rock band Titus Andronicus have covered the song multiple times on tour; the band included one of these live covers on their mixtape, Titus Andronicus LLC Mixtape Vol 1.
- Dashboard Confessional covered this song for their album The Wire Tapes Vol. 1.
- Deftones have also covered this song in live performances.
- Wakey Wakey covered this song for a Pinkerton tribute album.
- Allo Darlin' refer to the song and sample the lyrics from its chorus in their song "Kiss Your Lips".
