= Crush Management =

Musician management company

- Trade name: Crush Music
- Founders: Jonathan Daniel & Bob McLynn
- Headquarters: New York City

Crush Music is a New York City and Los Angeles based full-service talent management firm that focuses on managing musical artists, such as Miley Cyrus, Sia, Kesha, Green Day, Panic! at the Disco, Lorde, Train, Weezer, and Fall Out Boy. The company was founded by Jonathan Daniel, formerly of Electric Angels and several other glam rock bands, and Bob McLynn, formerly of The Step Kings.

In 2016, Crush Music opened a music label in collaboration with Warner Music Group. The company announced that their future label songs will be released via Atlantic Records or Warner Bros. Records.

== Current clients ==
- Alanis Morissette
- Butch Walker
- Courtney Love
- Fall Out Boy
- The Gaslight Anthem
- Green Day
- Lennon Stella
- Kesha
- Lorde
- Lil Nas X
- Little Image
- Lykke Li
- MARINA
- Miley Cyrus
- Miike Snow
- Rick Springfield
- Sia
- Sofia Isella
- The B-52's
- Train
- Weezer

== Former clients ==
- The Academy Is...
- The Cab
- Cobra Starship
- Destroy Rebuild Until God Shows
- Four Year Strong
- Gym Class Heroes
- Hey Monday
- The Hush Sound
- New Politics
- MAX
- Millionaires
- Panic! at the Disco
- Travie McCoy
- Tyga

== Producers, writers, and arrangers ==
- Jonny Coffer
- Ilsey Juber
- Morgan Kibby
- Jake Sinclair
- Suzy Shinn
- Andrew Wyatt
