= Pinkerton (album) =

Studio album by Weezer
- Released: September 24, 1996
- Recorded: August 22, 1995 – late July 1996
- Studios: Sound City (Hollywood); Hollywood Sound (Los Angeles); Fort Apache (Boston); Rumbo (Los Angeles); Electric Lady (New York)
- Genres: Alternative rock; emo; power pop; pop-punk; indie rock
- Length: 34:36
- Label: DGC
- Producer: Weezer

Weezer chronology
Weezer (1994)	Pinkerton (1996)	Christmas CD (2000)

Singles from Pinkerton
- 1. "El Scorcho" Released: September 10, 1996; 2. "The Good Life" Released: October 29, 1996; 3. "Pink Triangle" Released: May 20, 1997

Pinkerton is the second studio album by the American rock band Weezer, released on September 24, 1996, by DGC Records. The guitarist and vocalist Rivers Cuomo wrote most of Pinkerton while studying at Harvard University, after abandoning plans for a rock opera, Songs from the Black Hole. It was the last Weezer album to feature the bassist Matt Sharp, who left in 1998.

To better capture their live sound, Weezer self-produced Pinkerton, creating a darker, more abrasive album than their self-titled 1994 debut. Cuomo's lyrics express loneliness and disillusionment with the rock lifestyle. The title comes from the character BF Pinkerton from Giacomo Puccini's 1904 opera Madama Butterfly, whom Cuomo described as an "asshole American sailor similar to a touring rock star".

Pinkerton produced the singles "El Scorcho" and "The Good Life". It debuted at number 19 on the US Billboard 200, failing to meet sales expectations. It received mixed reviews; Rolling Stone readers voted it the third-worst album of 1996. For subsequent albums, Cuomo returned to more traditional pop songwriting and less personal lyrics.

In later years, Pinkerton was reassessed and achieved acclaim. Several publications named it one of the best albums of the 1990s, and it was certified platinum in the US in 2016. Several emo bands have credited it as an influence.

== Background ==
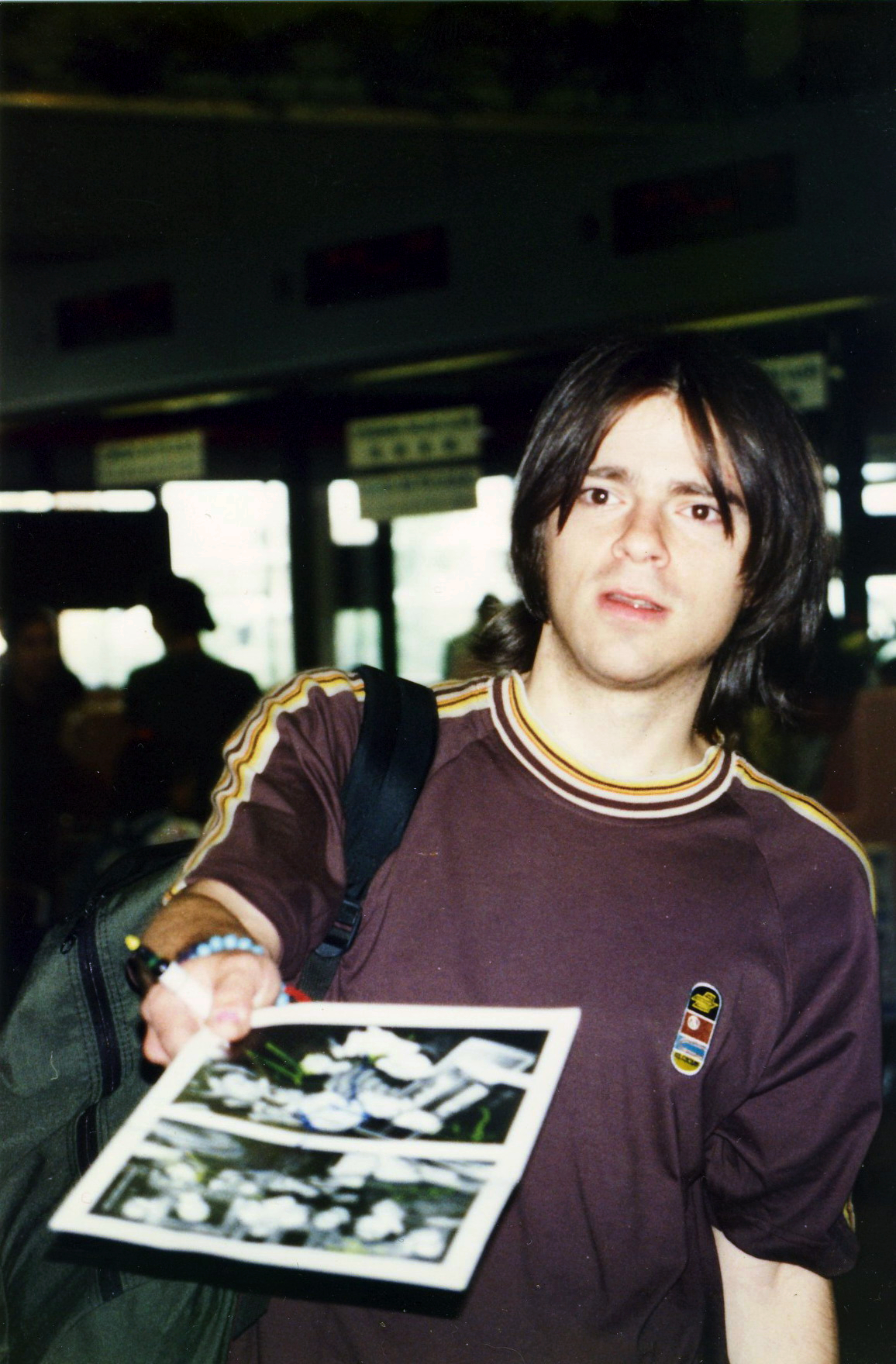
Frontman Rivers Cuomo (pictured in 1997) cited his struggles with musical success as an inspiration for the writing of Pinkerton.

In 1994, after the multi-platinum success of Weezer's self-titled debut album (also known as the Blue Album), Weezer took a break from touring for Christmas. The singer and songwriter, Rivers Cuomo, felt limited by rock music. Every night, after performing with Weezer, he listened to Giacomo Puccini's 1904 opera Madama Butterfly; the "depth of emotion and sadness and tragedy" inspired him to go further with his music.

In his home state of Connecticut, Cuomo began preparing material for Weezer's next album using an 8-track recorder. His original concept was a rock opera, Songs from the Black Hole, that would express his mixed feelings about success. Weezer developed Songs from the Black Hole through intermittent recording sessions throughout 1995.

On April 14, 1995, Cuomo, who was born with one leg shorter than the other, had extensive leg surgery to lengthen his right leg, followed by weeks of painful physical therapy. This affected his songwriting, as he would spend long periods hospitalized, unable to walk without the use of a cane, and under the influence of painkillers.

In the same period, Cuomo applied to study classical composition at Harvard University with a letter describing his disillusionment with the rock lifestyle: "You will meet two hundred people every night, but each conversation will generally last approximately thirty seconds ... Then you will be alone again, in your motel room. Or you will be on your bus, in your little space, trying to kill the nine hours it takes to get to the next city, whichever city it is."

By May 1996, Cuomo's songwriting had become "darker, more visceral and exposed, less playful", and the Songs from the Black Hole concept was abandoned. Weezer's second album would instead feature songs written while Cuomo was at Harvard, chronicling his loneliness and frustration, or what Cuomo referred to as his "dark side".

== Recording ==
In 1995, shortly before Cuomo left to study at Harvard, Weezer spent two weeks at New York City's Electric Lady Studios, where they had recorded their debut, and tracked the songs "Why Bother?", "Getchoo", "No Other One" and "Tired of Sex". Weezer hoped to explore "deeper, darker, more experimental stuff" and better capture their live sound. They decided against hiring a producer, feeling that "the best way for us to sound like ourselves is to record on our own". To give the album a live, "raw" feel, Cuomo, the guitarist Brian Bell and the bassist, Matt Sharp, recorded their vocals in tandem around three microphones rather than overdubbing them separately.

While Cuomo was at Harvard, other Weezer members worked on side projects. Sharp promoted Return of the Rentals, the debut album by his band, The Rentals, while Bell and the drummer, Patrick Wilson, worked on material for their bands the Space Twins and the Special Goodness. In January 1996, during Cuomo's winter break, Weezer regrouped for a two-week session at Sound City Studios in Van Nuys, Los Angeles, to complete the songs they had worked on in August. The Weezer collaborator Karl Koch said Sound City was "a significant part of the sound".

After recording "El Scorcho" and "Pink Triangle", they separated while Cuomo returned to Harvard. During Cuomo's 1996 spring break, Weezer regrouped at Sound City Studios and recorded "The Good Life", "Across the Sea" and "Falling for You" before Cuomo returned to Harvard for his finals. They completed Pinkerton in mid-1996 in Los Angeles. Two additional tracks, "I Swear It's True" and "Getting Up and Leaving", were abandoned before mixing.

== Music and lyrics ==
There are some lyrics on the album that you might think are mean or sexist. I will feel genuinely bad if anyone feels hurt by my lyrics but I really wanted these songs to be an exploration of my "dark side"—all the parts of myself that I was either afraid or embarrassed to think about before. So there's some pretty nasty stuff on there. You may be more willing to forgive the lyrics if you see them as passing low points in a larger story. And this album really is a story: the story of the last 2 years of my life. And as you're probably well aware, these have been two very weird years.

— Rivers Cuomo's letter to the Weezer fan club, two months before the release of Pinkerton

Like Weezer's debut, Pinkerton is an alternative rock album with elements of power pop and heavy metal, but with a darker, less polished sound. According to Stephen Thomas Erlewine of AllMusic, "The guitars rage and squeal, the beats are brutal and visceral, the vocals are mixed to the front, filled with overlapping, off-the-cuff backing vocals ... In short, it sounds like the work of a live band."

The lyrics feature self-deprecating humor. Writing from a more direct and personal perspective, Cuomo wrote of his dysfunctional relationships, sexual frustration, and struggles with identity. Pinkerton charts his "cycle between 'lame-o and partier'". Erlewine described it as a "singer-songwriter record representing Rivers Cuomo's bid for respectability".

At just under 35 minutes, Pinkerton is, according to Cuomo, "short by design". The first song, "Tired of Sex", written before the release of the Blue Album, has Cuomo describing meaningless sex with groupies and wondering why true love eludes him. "Across the Sea" was inspired by a letter Cuomo received from a Japanese fan: "When I got the letter, I fell in love with her ... I was very lonely at the time, but at the same time I was very depressed that I would never meet her."

"The Good Life" chronicles the rebirth of Cuomo after an identity crisis as an Ivy League loner. Cuomo, who felt isolated at Harvard, wrote it after "becoming frustrated with that hermit's life I was leading, the ascetic life. And I think I was starting to become frustrated with my whole dream about purifying myself and trying to live like a monk or an intellectual and going to school and holding out for this perfect, ideal woman. And so I wrote the song. And I started to turn around and come back the other way."

"El Scorcho" addresses Cuomo's shyness and inability to approach a woman while at Harvard; he explained that the song "is more about me, because at that point I hadn't even talked to the girl, I didn't really know much about her." "Pink Triangle" describes a man who falls in love, but discovers the object of his devotion is a lesbian.

Pinkerton is named after the character BF Pinkerton from Madama Butterfly, who marries and then abandons a Japanese woman named Butterfly. Calling him an "asshole American sailor similar to a touring rock star", Cuomo felt the character was "the perfect symbol for the part of myself that I am trying to come to terms with on this album". Other titles considered included Playboy and Diving into the Wreck (after the poem by Adrienne Rich).

The Japanese allusions are infused with the narrator's romantic disappointments and sexual frustration. Cuomo wrote that Pinkerton "is really the clash of East vs West. My hindu, zen, kyokushin [karate], self-denial, self-abnegation, no-emotion, cool-faced side versus my Italian-American heavy metal side." The songs are mostly sequenced in the order in which he wrote them, and so "the album kind of tells the story of my struggle with my inner Pinkerton".

== Artwork ==
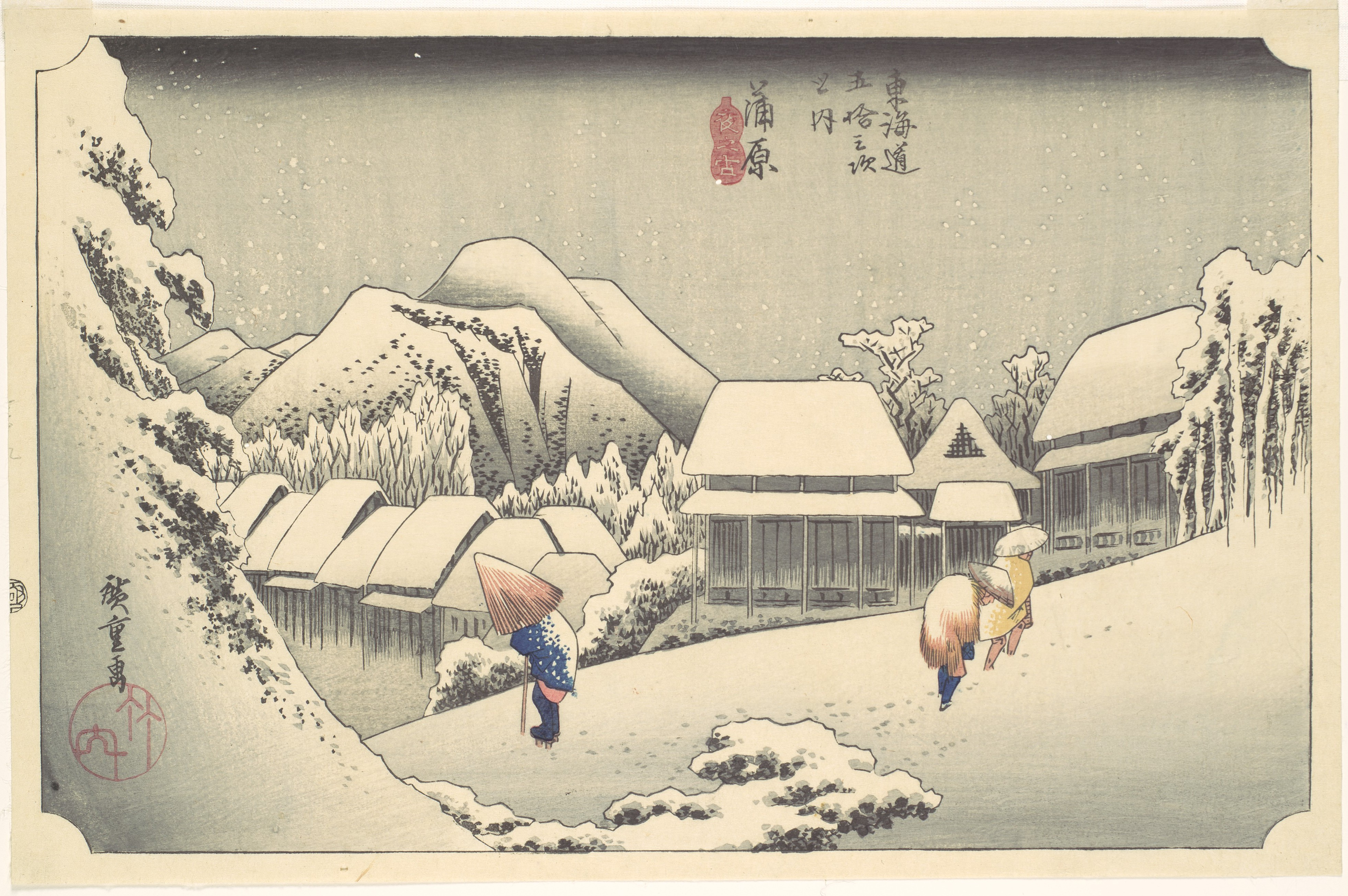
Kanbara yoru no yuki by Hiroshige, from which the Pinkerton cover is derived

The cover artwork is derived from Kanbara yoru no yuki ("Night snow at Kanbara") from the Japanese ukiyo-e artist Hiroshige's 1830s series 53 Stations of the Tōkaidō. Lyrics from Madama Butterfly are printed on the Pinkerton CD in their original Italian: "Everywhere in the world, the roving Yankee takes his pleasure and his profit, indifferent to all risks. He drops anchor at random..."

Behind the CD tray is a map with the title Isola della farfalla e penisola di cane (Italian for "Island of the Butterfly and Peninsula of Dog"). On the map are a ship named USS Pinkerton and "Mykel and Carli Island", alluding to Weezer's fan club founders, and the names of some of Cuomo's influences, including Howard Stern, Yngwie Malmsteen, Brian Wilson, Lou Barlow, Joe Matt, Camille Paglia and Ace Frehley.

== Release and promotion ==
Todd Sullivan, an A&R representative from Weezer's record label, Geffen, described Pinkerton as a "very brave record", but worried: "What sort of light does this put the band in? It could have been interpreted as them being a disposable pop band." Geffen was pleased with the record and felt that fans would not be disappointed.

Weezer turned down a video treatment for the lead single, "El Scorcho", proposed by Spike Jonze, who had helped raise Weezer's status with his videos for "Undone – The Sweater Song" and "Buddy Holly". Cuomo said: "I really want the songs to come across untainted this time around… I really want to communicate my feelings directly and because I was so careful in writing that way. I'd hate for the video to kinda misrepresent the song, or exaggerate certain aspects." The "El Scorcho" video features Weezer playing in an assembly hall in Los Angeles, surrounded by light fixtures flashing in time to the music. The director, Mark Romanek, quit after arguments with Cuomo, leaving Cuomo to edit the video himself. The video debuted on MTV's 120 Minutes and received moderate airplay.

Pinkerton debuted at number 19 on the US Billboard 200 chart, its highest position. It sold 47,000 copies its first week, falling far short of the sales of Weezer's first album. "El Scorcho" reached number 19, and "The Good Life" reached number 32. As Pinkerton was not meeting sales expectations, Weezer felt pressure to make another music video more to the liking of MTV. The video for "The Good Life", directed by Jonathan Dayton and Valerie Faris, stars Mary Lynn Rajskub as a pizza delivery girl, and uses split screen angles appearing as a fractured full image. Geffen rush-released the video to try to save the album, but was not successful.

=== Tour ===
In October 1996, Weezer toured Australia, New Zealand and Japan. Afterwards, they flew home to Los Angeles, where Wilson and Sharp made a promotional appearance on the nationally syndicated radio show Modern Rock Live. On November 1, Weezer began a tour of North America at the Ventura Theatre in Ventura, California. On November 6, they performed an acoustic set at Shorecrest High School in Seattle due to a contest won by a student.

Weezer continued to tour until mid-1997. The tour was postponed when the sisters Mykel, Carli and Trysta Allan died in a car accident while driving home from a Weezer show in Denver, Colorado. Mykel and Carli ran Weezer's fan club and helped manage publicity for several other Los Angeles bands, and had inspired the Weezer song "Mykel and Carli". Weezer canceled a show to attend their funeral. In August, Weezer and other bands held a benefit concert for their family in Los Angeles.

=== Pinkerton's Inc. lawsuit ===
A day before Pinkerton was to be released on September 24, 1996, a restraining order was obtained by Californian security firm Pinkerton's Inc. Pinkerton sued Weezer and Geffen for federal trademark infringement, claiming they were trying to capitalize on their reputation. Under the terms of the restraining order, which had Pinkerton's Inc. seeking two million dollars in damages, Weezer would be kept from "selling, distributing, or advertising" an album under the name Pinkerton. The Geffen spokesman Dennis Dennehy defended the title, arguing that it was a reference to Madama Butterfly and not aimed at "any sort of corporate entity". Cuomo wrote a six-page paper explaining why he chose the title and why he felt it was essential. The case was thrown out of court after the judge determined that "the hardship of not issuing the Pinkerton disc would be greater for Geffen than any hardship Pinkerton's Inc or its shareholders might incur from consumers who mistakenly presume the company has anything to do with the album".

== Critical reception ==
Professional ratings
Initial reviews
Review scores
Source	Rating
Chicago Tribune	3/4 stars
Entertainment Weekly	B
The Guardian	3/5 stars
Los Angeles Times	3/4 stars
NME	7/10
Pitchfork	7.5/10
Q	4/5 stars
Rolling Stone	3/5 stars
Select	3/5
Spin	7/10

Initial reviews of Pinkerton were mixed. Jeff Gordinier of Entertainment Weekly deemed it "a collection of get-down party anthems for agoraphobics" and criticized Weezer's choice to self-produce, which he felt resulted in a "sloppy and raw" aesthetic inferior to the pop sound of their debut. In Rolling Stone, Rob O'Connor called Cuomo's songwriting "juvenile", and singled out "Tired of Sex" as "aimless". However, he praised "Butterfly" as "a real treat, a gentle acoustic number that recalls the vintage, heartbreaking beauty of Big Star … suggesting that underneath the geeky teenager pose is an artist well on his way to maturity". Rolling Stone readers voted the album the third-worst of 1996. Some listeners were perturbed by the sexual lyrics; In Melody Maker, Jennifer Nine praised the music but advised listeners to ignore the lyrics.

Steve Appleford of the Los Angeles Times wrote that the songs were "sloppy and awkward, but express a seemingly genuine, desperate search for sex and love". Mark Beaumont of NME praised Pinkerton, writing that "by the time the affecting acoustic lament 'Butterfly' wafts in ... Pinkerton starts feeling like a truly moving album". Ryan Schreiber of Pitchfork wrote that "Pinkerton might actually be a bit much for fans who were wooed with the clean production and immediately accessible sound of these guys' debut, but if given a chance, it might surprise even some anti-Weezer folk". The Guardian critic Kathy Sweeney found Pinkerton "noisier and messier than their last album, and all the better for it". In another positive review, Dave Henderson of Q said that "on every tale of romance, delivered in perfect verse/chorus formula, you can see Jennifer Aniston giving it some attitude in the kitchen".

== Legacy ==
Professional ratings
Retrospective reviews
Aggregate scores
Source	Rating
Metacritic	100/100 (deluxe edition)
Review scores
Source	Rating
AllMusic	5/5 stars
American Songwriter	4.5/5 stars
Consequence of Sound	5/5 stars
Entertainment Weekly	A
Kerrang!	5/5
Pitchfork	10/10
PopMatters	10/10
Record Collector	5/5 stars
Rolling Stone	5/5 stars
The Rolling Stone Album Guide	5/5 stars

Cuomo was embarrassed by Pinkerton's reception and the personal nature of its songs. According to the Guardian, "For a long time, Cuomo talked about Pinkerton like it was his high school diary, a humiliating reminder of a time when he was unapologetically emotional and corny." In August 1997, Cuomo wrote in his diaries: "This has been a tough year. It's not just that the world has said Pinkerton isn't worth a shit, but that the Blue album wasn't either. It was a fluke ... I'm a shitty songwriter."

After the Pinkerton tour, Sharp left the band, and Weezer went on a hiatus. In the following years, Pinkerton amassed a cult following through internet word of mouth. A wave of mainstream emo bands including Jimmy Eat World, Saves the Day, Dashboard Confessional and Motion City Soundtrack began citing it as an influence. In 2001, Cuomo mentioned to David Geffen, the head of Geffen Records, that Pinkerton had "turned into a real phenomenon". Geffen responded that "cult phenomenon" was a euphemism for failure.

Cuomo told Rolling Stone in 2001: "The most painful thing in my life these days is the cult around Pinkerton. It's just a sick album, sick in a diseased sort of way." He told Entertainment Weekly:

It's a hideous record ... It was such a hugely painful mistake that happened in front of hundreds of thousands of people and continues to happen on a grander and grander scale and just won't go away. It's like getting really drunk at a party and spilling your guts in front of everyone and feeling incredibly great and cathartic about it, and then waking up the next morning and realizing what a complete fool you made of yourself.

For Weezer's subsequent albums, Cuomo moved to simpler songwriting with less personal lyrics. Rolling Stone described Weezer's followup, the Green Album (2001), as the "anti-Pinkerton", with "squeaky-clean" production and album art that recalled Weezer's debut. Sharp sued Weezer in 2001 for songwriting royalties, including songs from Pinkerton.

Pinkerton's critical standing continued to rise, and it came to be considered among Weezer's best work by fans and critics. In 2002, Rolling Stone readers voted it the 16th-greatest album of all time. In 2003, Pitchfork gave Pinkerton a perfect score and named it the 53rd-greatest album of the 1990s. In 2004, Rolling Stone gave it a new review, awarding it five out of five and adding it to the Rolling Stone Hall of Fame. Over the following years, it appeared in best-of lists by publications including Spin and Drowned in Sound. By August 2009, Pinkerton had sold 852,000 copies in the US and was certified gold. In 2016, almost 20 years after its release, Pinkerton was certified platinum for sales of over one million copies in the US. That year, Alana Levinson of the Guardian wrote that Pinkerton's "conversational, confessional" lyrics were appropriate in the age of social media. In 2025, the staff of Radio X named Pinkerton one of the most disappointing follow-up albums and called it "a collection of rather mean-spirited songs".

By 2008, Cuomo had reconsidered the album, saying: "Pinkerton's great. It's super-deep, brave, and authentic. Listening to it, I can tell that I was really going for it when I wrote and recorded a lot of those songs." In 2010, Bell told The Aquarian Weekly: "Pinkerton has definitely taken on a life of its own and became more successful and more accepted … As an artist, you just have to do what you believe in at the time, whether it's accepted or not. You just have to keep going with it." That year, Weezer embarked on the Memories Tour, playing Blue and Pinkerton in their entirety. Cuomo said it was "validating" to see audiences sing along to Pinkerton songs after the rejection he felt performing them in the past.

=== Accolades ===
Accolades for Pinkerton
Publication	Country	Accolade	Year	Rank
Spin	United States	100 Greatest Albums, 1985–2005	2005	61
Pitchfork	United States	Top 100 Albums of the 1990s	2003	53
Guitar World	United States	Top 100 Guitar Albums of All Time	2005	76
Rolling Stone	United States	100 Greatest Albums of the '90s	2010	48
Alternative Press	United States	20 Albums From 1996 that Mark Some of the Best of the Decade	2021	N/A
NME	United Kingdom	The 500 Greatest Albums of All Time	2013	108

== Further releases ==
On November 2, 2010, DGC reissued Pinkerton with live performances, B-sides, and previously unreleased songs. It debuted at number six on the Billboard Catalog Albums chart and achieved a perfect score on the aggregate review website Metacritic.

In 2011, Cuomo published a book, The Pinkerton Diaries, which collects his writings from the era, including lyrics, studio notes, journals, emails, letters, and essays. It was sold with the compilation album Alone III: The Pinkerton Years, compiling demos recorded between 1993 and 1996, when Cuomo was writing material for Pinkerton and Songs from the Black Hole.

In May 2016, for its 20th anniversary, Pinkerton was reissued on vinyl by the record subscription service Vinyl Me, Please. The album was pressed on "dark blue translucent vinyl with black marbling" and packaged in a custom sleeve with pop-out art, a custom lyric sheet, artwork by the Japanese painter Fuco Ueda, and a sake cocktail recipe. In September 2026, its 30th anniversary, Pinkerton was reissued in a limited-edition anniversary including B-sides, a lyric sheet insert and stationery.

== Track listing ==
All tracks are written by Rivers Cuomo. (Note: On April 19, 2002, bassist Matt Sharp filed a five-count federal lawsuit against Weezer, with one of his allegations being that he co-wrote the first nine tracks of Pinkerton. The suit was later settled out of court.)

No.	Title	Length
1.	"Tired of Sex"	3:01
2.	"Getchoo"	2:52
3.	"No Other One"	3:01
4.	"Why Bother?"	2:08
5.	"Across the Sea"	4:32
6.	"The Good Life"	4:17
7.	"El Scorcho"	4:03
8.	"Pink Triangle"	3:58
9.	"Falling for You"	3:47
10.	"Butterfly"	2:53
Total length:		34:36

Deluxe Edition
No.	Title	Length
11.	"You Gave Your Love To Me Softly" (Angus film soundtrack and El Scorcho b-side)	1:58
12.	"Devotion" (Songs from the Black Hole, El Scorcho b-side)	3:11
13.	"The Good Life - Radio Remix"	4:05
14.	"Waiting On You" (The Good Life b-side)	4:11
15.	"I Just Threw Out The Love Of My Dreams" (Songs from the Black Hole, The Good Life b-side)	2:37
16.	"The Good Life - Acoustic /Live"	4:38
17.	"Pink Triangle - Radio Remix"	4:01
18.	"I Swear It's True" (Blue Album Deluxe Edition / Dusty Gems and Raw Nuggets b-side)	3:19
19.	"Pink Triangle - Acoustic /Live Shorecrest High School, Seattle, Washington 1996"	4:26
20.	"Interview - 107.7 The End - Blue vs Pinkerton" (Hidden Track, Various Artists)	1:32
Total length:		68:34

Deluxe Edition Disc 2
No.	Title	Writer(s)	Length
1.	"You Won't Get With Me Tonight" (Songs from the Black Hole)		3:29
2.	"The Good Life - Live at Y100 Sonic Studios/1997"		4:37
3.	"El Scorcho - Live at Y100 Sonic Studios/1997"		4:07
4.	"Pink Triangle - Live at Y100 Sonic Session/1997"		4:10
5.	"Why Bother? - Live at Reading Festival / 1996"		2:18
6.	"El Scorcho - Live at Reading Festival / 1996"		4:09
7.	"Pink Triangle - Live at Reading Festival / 1996"		4:52
8.	"The Good Life - Live at X96 / 1997"		4:13
9.	"El Scorcho - Live/Acoustic at Shorecrest High School/1996"		4:26
10.	"Across The Sea Piano Noodles"		0:38
11.	"Butterfly - Alternate Take"		2:48
12.	"Long Time Sunshine"		3:28
13.	"Getting Up And Leaving"	Rivers Cuomo; Patrick Wilson	4:17
14.	"Tired Of Sex - Tracking Rough"		2:57
15.	"Getchoo - Tracking Rough"		2:57
16.	"Tragic Girl"		5:26
Total length:			127:26

== Personnel ==
Adapted from the liner notes.

Weezer

- Brian Bell – guitar, vocals
- Rivers Cuomo – vocals, guitar, keyboards, glockenspiel, clarinet
- Matt Sharp – bass, vocals
- Patrick Wilson – drums

Additional musicians

- Karl Koch – percussion on "Butterfly"

Technical personnel

- Weezer – production
- Jack Joseph Puig – mixing, engineer
- Joe Barresi – engineer
- Dave Fridmann – engineer
- Adam Kasper – engineer
- Clif Norrell – engineer
- Rob Jacobs – engineer
- Jim Rondinelli – engineer
- Billy Bowers – second engineer
- Greg Fidelman – second engineer
- Dan McLaughlin – second engineer
- Jim Champagne – second engineer
- David Dominguez – second engineer
- George Marino – mastering
- Spike Jonze – photography
- Karl Koch – webmaster
- Janet Wolsborn – art assistant
- Hiroshige – cover art ("Kanbara: Night Snow")

== Charts ==
=== Weekly charts ===
Weekly chart performance for Pinkerton
Chart (1996)	Peak position
Australian Albums (ARIA)	38
Austrian Albums (Ö3 Austria)	41
Canada Top Albums/CDs (RPM)	15
Dutch Albums (Album Top 100)	94
Finnish Albums (Suomen virallinen lista)	35
German Albums (Offizielle Top 100)	65
Japanese Albums (Oricon)	47
New Zealand Albums (RMNZ)	11
Norwegian Albums (VG-lista)	18
Swedish Albums (Sverigetopplistan)	4
UK Albums (Official Charts)	43
US Billboard 200	19

=== Year-end charts ===
2002 year-end chart performance for Pinkerton
Chart (2002)	Position
Canadian Alternative Albums (Nielsen SoundScan)	137

== Certifications ==
Certifications and sales for Pinkerton
Region	Certification	Certified units/sales
Canada (Music Canada)	Gold	50,000^{^}
United Kingdom (BPI)	Gold	100,000^{‡}
United States (RIAA)	Platinum	1,000,000^{‡}
^{^} Shipments figures based on certification alone.^{‡} Sales+streaming figures based on certification alone.
