= Troublemaker (Weezer song) =

Single by Weezer

from the album Weezer (The Red Album)
- Released: July 26, 2008
- Recorded: 2008
- Genre: Power pop
- Length: 2:45
- Label: Geffen
- Songwriter: Rivers Cuomo
- Producer: Jacknife Lee

Weezer singles chronology
"Dreamin'" (2008)	"Troublemaker" (2008)	"(If You're Wondering If I Want You To) I Want You To" (2009)

Music video
- "Troublemaker" on YouTube

Alternative cover
- iTunes cover

"Troublemaker" is a song that was originally released as an iTunes single from alternative rock band Weezer's sixth album and third self-titled album, Weezer (also referred to by fans and the band as The Red Album). It was released in digital form on May 20, 2008, as the fourth single from the album. It debuted the week of July 26, 2008, at No. 39 on the Billboard Hot Modern Rock Tracks charts and peaked at No. 2.

== Background and release ==
This song was originally planned to be the first single for the album, but "Pork and Beans" was chosen instead.

Rivers Cuomo has stated the song, along with others from The Red Album, were heavily influenced by rapper Eminem and his "fun way of using rhymes".

Weezer played an acoustic version of "Troublemaker" on the May 30, 2008, episode of Alternative Nation on Sirius Radio.

The song was released as a downloadable track for the games Rock Band (along with "Dreamin'" and "The Greatest Man That Ever Lived") and Tap Tap Revenge.

The song was also used for TV commercials for CBS's crime drama show The Mentalist, which premiered in September 2008. It is also used in the trailer for Fired Up. "Troublemaker", along with "The Greatest Man That Ever Lived", appeared in the documentary Warren Miller's Children of Winter. The song was featured in a season 5 episode of Psych.

== Music video ==
Weezer fans were invited to take part in the music video for "Troublemaker." The music video (directed by The Malloys) took place outside of The Forum in Inglewood, California. It consists of the band performing the song, with shots of the band members and fans breaking Guinness World Records, such as "Largest Air Guitar Ensemble", "Most People on a Skateboard", "Longest Session of Guitar Hero World Tour", "Largest Game of Dodgeball", and "Most People in a Custard Pie Fight". The music video was released on October 6, 2008.

== Charts ==
=== Weekly charts ===
Weekly chart performance for "Troublemaker"
Chart (2008)	Peak position
Canada Hot 100 (Billboard)	51
Canada Rock (Billboard)	4
US Bubbling Under Hot 100 (Billboard)	21
US Alternative Airplay (Billboard)	2
US Mainstream Rock (Billboard)	35

=== Year-end charts ===
Year-end chart performance for "Troublemaker"
Chart (2008)	Position
US Alternative Airplay (Billboard)	22

== Certifications ==
Certifications for "Troublemaker"
Region	Certification	Certified units/sales
United States (RIAA)	Gold	500,000^{‡}
^{‡} Sales+streaming figures based on certification alone.

== Personnel ==
- Rivers Cuomo – lead guitar, lead vocals
- Patrick Wilson – drums, percussion, backing vocals
- Brian Bell – rhythm guitar, backing vocals
- Scott Shriner – bass guitar, backing vocals
