= The Greatest Man That Ever Lived (Variations on a Shaker Hymn) =

Single by Weezer

from the album Weezer (Red Album)
- Released: May 13, 2008
- Recorded: 2008
- Length: 5:52
- Label: Geffen
- Songwriter: Rivers Cuomo
- Producers: Rick Rubin; Weezer

Weezer singles chronology
"Pork and Beans" (2008)	"The Greatest Man That Ever Lived (Variations on a Shaker Hymn)" (2008)	"Dreamin'" (2008)

Music video
- "The Greatest Man That Ever Lived" on YouTube

"The Greatest Man That Ever Lived (Variations on a Shaker Hymn)" is a song released as an iTunes single from American alternative rock band Weezer's sixth album, Weezer (2008). "The Greatest Man That Ever Lived (Variations on a Shaker Hymn)" was released to radio on December 9, 2008. The song bears a resemblance to the Shaker song "Simple Gifts" hence the "(Variations on a Shaker Hymn)" in the title. According to lead vocalist and writer Rivers Cuomo, "The Greatest Man" has 11 different themes, including rapping and imitations of other bands such as Nirvana and Aerosmith (both of whom also recorded for Weezer's then-label Geffen Records at one point).

This song received favorable reviews. After being announced as the third single, a music video was also announced; however, this never materialized and instead the song was featured in a film directed by Warren Miller.

== Background and recording ==
Rick Rubin produced "The Greatest Man That Ever Lived" with the band between April 2007 and February 2008. In the liner notes of the deluxe edition of The Red Album, Cuomo stated that the song did not originally have the subtitle "Variations on a Shaker Hymn", but when guitarist Brian Bell's mother came into the studio to see them, she mentioned that the melody from the song sounded similar to a Shaker hymn that the choir sang in her church. Cuomo wrote that he realised that people might notice the resemblance: "I knew people were going to come at us after and say 'Hey, you guys ripped off that hymn.' So I put the credit in there off the bat." As a result, the band looked up the hymn and indeed the melody was so similar to Joseph Brackett's "Simple Gifts" that they credited the hymn with the subtitle.

The song was originally recorded in a room that the band nicknamed "The War Room". Bell states that "The Greatest Man That Ever Lived" took a long time to record; "I think the song 'The Greatest Man That Ever Lived' used about 20 feet of butcher paper and we discussed how we were going to successfully record it almost as long as actually recording it."

In an interview with KROQ-FM, Rivers Cuomo talked extensively about the concept behind the song. The song was originally titled "The Ballad of Oswaldo Sánchez", inspired by Sánchez playing in the 2006 World Cup after the death of his father. He mentioned the influence for each section, including the Baroque counterpoint vocal style which inspired the final 'Bach' & 'Beethoven' sections. In a January 21, 2009, interview on the NPR program Fresh Air, Cuomo stated that "The Greatest Man That Ever Lived (Variations on a Shaker Hymn)" is his favorite Weezer song. In a 2023 interview with Vulture, he also called it the band's "most under-appreciated" song.

== Composition and lyrics ==
"The Greatest Man That Ever Lived" (2008)
This is a 30-second sample from the song.

The song includes piano, police sirens, and Rivers Cuomo singing in falsetto, and it contains 11 segued verses in total. In an interview with Rolling Stone, Cuomo, when questioned about how practicing Vipassanā affects his music, says that the song is a lot different from any song he has previously written: "It's the most ambitious song I've ever attempted. It took me a few weeks of writing. And lyrically, it's a huge departure for me. I have a long history of writing songs from a victim type of place, and in this, I'm bragging."

In order, the themes are:

1. Rap 0:35
2. Slipknot 1:00
3. Jeff Buckley 1:26
4. Choral 1:51
5. Aerosmith 2:17
6. Nirvana 2:43
7. The Andrews Sisters 3:08
8. Green Day 3:33
9. Spoken word (heavily inspired by Elvis' "Are You Lonesome Tonight?") 4:06
10. Bach 4:37, Beethoven 4:54
11. Weezer 5:10

== Critical reception ==
"The Greatest Man That Ever Lived" was released in digital form on May 13, 2008. The song was generally well received by critics. Joan Anderman of The Boston Globe called the song "A sprawling folk-metal chorale that squashes wildly assorted references into epic musical settings." IGN called it a "Schizophrenic, six-minute roller-coaster of 10 movements," but did not expect the song to be a single: "I don't hear a single, but it's certainly the most curious song to leak from Cuomo's pen, and it is the runaway star of an equally spastic album." It was also one of five songs on the album to be considered "download worthy" by IGN. Although Marc Hogan of Pitchfork Media was critical of the album as a whole, he praised "The Greatest Man", calling it "[T]he warped genius let loose." NME's James McMahon likened it to "Mr. Blue Sky" by the English rock band Electric Light Orchestra, writing "[It] is without question the most ambitious song Cuomo has ever penned, cramming a rapped intro, barber-shop harmonies and ornate music box twinkling into a six-minute geek-pop rewrite of ELO's Mr Blue Sky.'"

Not all reviews were entirely positive. Jeffrey Canino of Tiny Mix Tapes criticized the introductory rap section of the song, "[It] brings forth an unpleasant memory of Fred Durst. All throughout, the band is experimenting with disparaging sounds, and the only thing that ties them together is Rick Rubin and Jacknife Lee's glossy production." Despite this, Canino still rates the song highly, "The bulk of the middle portion is really pretty okay, so we'll concede this one as a success." Similarly, Ira Robbins and Pete Crigler of TrouserPress.com said, "Despite that success, rap is not an advisable direction for Weezer." Alan Shulman of No Ripcord commented that the song did not have much lasting appeal: "The novelty begins to wear after the 4th or 5th listen," and Leah Greenblatt of Entertainment Weekly labelled the song a "Bombastic mini-rock opera" but also said the "remedial rhymes" marred an "otherwise intriguing musical experiment".

== Music video and appearances in other media ==
This song had been announced as the third single from The Red Album. Spike Jonze was said to be directing a video for the song. In the end, the video was not filmed and instead skiing and snowboarding film director Warren Miller used the song in a film called Children of Winter. The Weezer blog stated that it should not be considered official: "Note that while this [isn't] 'THE' music video for 'Greatest Man' - it's 'a' music video - [it's] nonetheless very cool indeed!" However, Weezer did film a video for the song through MTV, when they were selected as the MTV Artist of the Week. The video has the band sitting on a park bench lip syncing to their song playing through a boom box.

Professional wrestler Austin Aries adopted the song as his ring entrance music, while also beginning to refer to himself as "The Greatest Man That Ever Lived". The song was released as a downloadable song for the game Rock Band on June 26, 2008, along with "Dreamin'" and "Troublemaker".

== Personnel ==
- Rivers Cuomo – lead guitar, lead vocals
- Patrick Wilson – drums, percussion, backing vocals
- Brian Bell – rhythm guitar, keyboard, backing vocals
- Scott Shriner – bass guitar, backing vocals

== Charts ==
Chart (2008)	Peak position
US Alternative Airplay (Billboard)	35
