= Carnival Art =

American alternative rock band

- Also known as: Jerkwater
- Origin: Los Angeles, California, United States
- Genres: Alternative rock; alternative pop; indie rock
- Years active: 1989-1993
- Labels: Spineless Voodoo; Situation Two; Beggars Banquet
- Past members: Michael Petak; Shane Paul Rhody; Ed Dobrydnio; Brian Bell; Keith Fallis

Carnival Art was an American alternative rock band. Formed in Los Angeles in 1989, the band initially consisted of Michael Petak (lead vocals, guitar), Shane Paul Rhody (guitar, vocals), Ed Dobrydnio (bass guitar), and Keith Fallis (drums, vocals). They released their debut album Like Nobodys Business through their own label Spineless Voodoo Records the same year, and after this album, Rhody left the band, with Dobrydnio replacing him on lead guitar and Brian Bell joining to assume bass duties.

In 1990, the band released a promotional EP titled Dig, followed a year later by their second album Thrumdrone, released on Situation Two Records. Three more EPs titled Blue Food & Black Sparks, Wrestling Swamis Vs. Mr. Blue Veins, and Holy Smokes were also released from 1991 to 1992. The band was moved to Beggars Banquet Records after Situation Two's dissolution in 1992, and released their third and final studio album Welcome To Vas Llegas the same year. The band also recorded a cover of "Cold Ethyl" for an Alice Cooper tribute album titled Welcome to Our Nightmare: A Tribute to Alice Cooper, released in 1993 on Triple X Records.

Their lack of commercial success led to them being dropped from Beggars Banquet, and after an unsuccessful attempt at landing another deal under the name Jerkwater, the group disbanded. Following the break-up, Bell formed a duo with his then-girlfriend Susan Fox called the Space Twins, and became the rhythm guitarist for Weezer. Petak recorded a solo album titled Pretty Little Lonely, and Fallis became the drummer for Big Drill Car and Shufflepuck. Dobrydnio also joined Shufflepuck under the name Ed Alexander, and found work as A&R for Interscope and Vanguard Records. The song "Mr. Blue Veins", along with its music video, was featured in the episode "Water Safety" from the MTV animated series Beavis and Butt-head.

== Band members ==
- Michael Petak – lead vocals, guitar (1989-1993)
- Shane Paul Rhody – lead guitar, vocals (1989-1990)
- Ed Dobrydnio – bass guitar (1989-1990), lead guitar, vocals (1990-1993)
- Brian Bell – bass guitar, vocals (1990-1993)
- Keith Fallis – drums, vocals (1989-1993)

== Discography ==
=== Studio albums ===
Title	Details
Like Nobodys Business	Released: 1989; Formats: LP; Label: Spineless Voodoo; Track listing: 1. "Inches"; 2. "Dancing Earth"; 3. "Cool Dry Place"; 4. "Angel Of Mercy"; 5. "Velvet Elvis"; 6. "Indian Giver"; 7. "For Sale"; 8. "7 Day Divorce"; 9. "Skin"; 10. "Parade Of Fools"
Thrumdrone	Released: August 13, 1991; Formats: CD, LP, cassette; Label: Situation Two; Track listing: 1. "Blind"; 2. "Backyard King"; 3. "Little Doorprize"; 4. "Hammer And Nails"; 5. "Wrestling Swamis"; 6. "Octopus"; 7. "Sticky Green"; 8. "Will Power"; 9. "Neon And Debauchery"; 10. "Antihero"; 11. "Mr. Blue Veins"; 12. "Ruth's Advice"; 13. "Drop Dead"; 14. "Itchy Little House"; 15. "Bigger Things"; 16. "Mrs. Pear's Reptile Homework"
Welcome To Vas Llegas	Released: October 9, 1992; Formats: CD, LP, cassette; Label: Beggars Banquet; Track listing: 1. "Welcome To Vas Llegas"; 2. "Shit Thick"; 3. "Sucker Punch"; 4. "Which Is Wig"; 5. "Dread Full Head"; 6. "Blue Food"; 7. "Gold Plated Crazy"; 8. "Bullet Surprise"; 9. "Crepitus"; 10. "Little Elvis"; 11. "Pill Bugg"

=== EPs ===
Title	Details
Dig	Released: 1990; Formats: LP; Label: Spineless Voodoo; Track listing: 1. "Juice Dawg"; 2. "Mr. Blue Veins"; 3. "No Thanks To Eve (Live)"; 4. "Octopus"
Blue Food & Black Sparks	Released: 1991; Formats: CD, LP; Label: Situation Two; Track listing: 1. "Hammer And Nails"; 2. "Antihero"; 3. "Mr. Blue Veins"; 4. "Juice Dawg"
Wrestling Swamis Vs. Mr. Blue Veins	Released: 1991; Formats: CD, LP; Label: Situation Two; Track listing: 1. "Wrestling Swamis"; 2. "No Thanks To Eve"; 3. "Mr. Blue Veins"; 4. "Mr. Blue Veins (Acoustic)"
Holy Smokes	Released: 1992; Formats: CD, LP; Label: Situation Two; Track listing: 1. "Ray's Jesus"; 2. "Warhead"; 3. "Sore Finger"; 4. "She Describes Infinity"; 5. "Feel Like Makin' Love"

=== Appearances ===
Title	Year	Album
"Bring a Torch, Jeanette, Isabella"	1991	A Lump of Coal
"Cold Ethyl"	1993	Welcome to Our Nightmare: A Tribute to Alice Cooper

=== Music videos ===
Title	Year	Album
"Mr. Blue Veins"	1991	Thrumdrone
"Sucker Punch"	1992	Welcome To Vas Llegas
