= Beverly Hills (Weezer song) =

2005 single by Weezer

Single by Weezer

from the album Make Believe
- B-side: "Butterfly" (live)
- Released: March 28, 2005
- Genre: Power pop; rap rock
- Length: 3:18
- Label: Geffen
- Songwriter: Rivers Cuomo
- Producer: Rick Rubin

Weezer singles chronology
"Keep Fishin'" (2002)	"Beverly Hills" (2005)	"We Are All on Drugs" (2005)

Music video
- "Beverly Hills" on YouTube

"Beverly Hills" is a song by American rock band Weezer. It is the first single from the band's 2005 fifth album, Make Believe. "Beverly Hills" was released to US radio on March 28, 2005.

== Background ==
Rivers Cuomo's story behind "Beverly Hills": "I was at the opening of the new Hollywood Bowl and I flipped through the program and I saw a picture of Wilson Phillips. And for some reason I just thought how nice it would be to marry, like, an 'established' celebrity and live in Beverly Hills and be part of that world. And it was a totally sincere desire. And then I wrote that song, 'Beverly Hills'. For some reason, by the time it came out—and the video came out—it got twisted around into something that seemed sarcastic. But originally it wasn't meant to be sarcastic at all."

Cuomo stated that "Beverly Hills" and the solo, third verse, and last chorus of "Falling for You" (from the 1996 Weezer album Pinkerton) are his proudest musical achievements: "It's incredibly fun: a great beat, guitar riffs, catchy vocal style. Besides that, I think the lyrics are incredible in a very understated way. I might as well enjoy my life and watch the stars play. I love it! With this one song we were able to transcend our little niche and connect with all kinds of people, young and old, from all kinds of backgrounds."

== Chart performance ==
The song is Weezer's most commercially successful single. It topped the Billboard Modern Rock Tracks chart for a week, spending months near the top of the Billboard Hot 100 (peaking at number 10) and being certified gold on June 6, 2005; it was also the band's first song to chart there since "Undone – The Sweater Song" at number 57 in 1994 after 11 years, since the rest of Weezer's past hits had only managed to chart on the Hot 100 Airplay or the Bubbling Under Hot 100 chart. As of February 2025, it is still the band's highest-charting Hot 100 single, as well as their only top-40 hit there. As of January 2006, the digital single has been purchased over 962,000 times on iTunes, the third most-sold digital single during 2005. It also did very well on other Billboard charts, such as Adult Top 40 (number eight peak), Mainstream Top 40 (number two peak), and Mainstream Rock Tracks (number 26 peak).

The song also made the top 10 on the UK Singles Chart, peaking at number nine, and remained on the chart for five weeks. The song was nominated for Best Rock Song at the 48th Annual Grammy Awards, the first ever nomination for the band. The video for the song was nominated at the 2005 MTV Video Music Awards for Best Rock Video. The song won College Song of the Year at the 54th Annual Broadcast Music Incorporated Pop Awards. "Beverly Hills" stayed at number one on the Modern Rock charts for one week. It was the first number one for Weezer, but this record was later met with "Perfect Situation", Make Believe's third single, which held the pole position for four weeks. The song was the third highest selling digital download of 2005 in the US according to Nielsen SoundScan.

== Music video ==
The music video for this song, directed by Marcos Siega, was filmed at the Playboy Mansion (which is actually not located in Beverly Hills, but the neighboring community of Holmby Hills), with Hugh Hefner making a cameo appearance at the beginning.

== Track listings ==
UK 7-inch picture disc

A. "Beverly Hills" – 3:24
B. "Butterfly" (live) – 3:56

European CD single

1. "Beverly Hills" – 3:20
2. "Island in the Sun" (live) – 3:54

European enhanced CD single

1. "Beverly Hills" – 3:20
2. "Island in the Sun" (live) – 3:54
3. "Butterfly" (live) – 3:56
4. "Beverly Hills" (video)

== Personnel ==
Personnel are taken from the Make Believe CD booklet.

Weezer

- Brian Bell
- Rivers Cuomo
- Scott Shriner
- Pat Wilson

Additional performer

- Stephanie Eitel – additional vocals

Technical personnel

- Rick Rubin – production
- Chad Bramford – additional production
- Weezer – additional production
- Rich Costey – mixing

== Charts ==
=== Weekly charts ===
Weekly chart performance for "Beverly Hills"
Chart (2005–2006)	Peak position
Austria (Ö3 Austria Top 40)	50
Canada (Nielsen BDS)	22
Canada CHR/Pop Top 30 (Radio & Records)	5
Canada Hot AC Top 30 (Radio & Records)	22
Canada Rock Top 30 (Radio & Records)	4
Germany (GfK)	97
Ireland (IRMA)	34
New Zealand (Recorded Music NZ)	31
Scottish Singles Sales (Official Charts)	11
UK Singles (Official Charts)	9
US Billboard Hot 100	10
US Adult Alternative Airplay (Billboard)	19
US Adult Pop Airplay (Billboard)	8
US Alternative Airplay (Billboard)	1
US Mainstream Rock (Billboard)	26
US Pop Airplay (Billboard)	2

=== Year-end charts ===
Year-end chart performance for "Beverly Hills"
Chart (2005)	Position
US Billboard Hot 100	20
US Adult Top 40 (Billboard)	53
US Mainstream Top 40 (Billboard)	24
US Modern Rock Tracks (Billboard)	5

== Certifications ==
Certifications for "Beverly Hills"
Region	Certification	Certified units/sales
New Zealand (RMNZ)	Platinum	30,000^{‡}
United Kingdom (BPI)	Silver	200,000^{‡}
United States (RIAA)	5× Platinum	5,000,000^{‡}
^{‡} Sales+streaming figures based on certification alone.

== Release history ==
Release dates and formats for "Beverly Hills"
Region	Date	Format(s)	Label(s)	Ref(s).
United States	March 28, 2005	Triple A; alternative radio	Geffen	
United Kingdom	May 2, 2005	7-inch vinyl	Geffen	
United States	May 16, 2005	Contemporary hit radio	Geffen	

== Cover versions ==
"Weird Al" Yankovic included the song in his polka medley "Polkarama!" from his 2006 album, Straight Outta Lynwood.
