= I'm Your Daddy =

Single by Weezer

from the album Raditude
- Released: January 20, 2010
- Recorded: July 2009
- Genre: Alternative rock; power pop
- Length: 3:08
- Label: Geffen
- Songwriters: Rivers Cuomo; Dr. Luke
- Producer: Dr. Luke

Weezer singles chronology
"(If You're Wondering If I Want You To) I Want You To" (2009)	"I'm Your Daddy" (2010)	"Memories" (2010)

Music video
- "I'm Your Daddy" on YouTube

"I'm Your Daddy" is a song by the band Weezer. It is the second track and second American single after "(If You're Wondering If I Want You To) I Want You To" from the band's seventh studio album, Raditude (2009). The band released the single on January 20, 2010, and it debuted at number thirty on the Modern Rock Tracks.

== Reception ==
"I'm Your Daddy" was mentioned in many professional reviews of Raditude with mixed to positive reactions. Rolling Stone writer Rob Sheffield liked Raditude and singled out "I'm Your Daddy" by saying that Cuomo's "willingness to make fun of his psychosexual damage only makes (the song) more poignant". New York Times writer Ben Ratliff called the song "the record’s best riff-monster" and said that is "bears traces of trademark Weezer-think". Some reviewers who didn't like the album still point out the song as being one of its better tracks; The A.V. Club gave the album a C+ on their website but still referred to "I'm Your Daddy" as "well-crafted pop".

== Music video ==
Two music videos were officially released for "I'm Your Daddy".

The first video premiered on MySpace on March 29, 2010. Filmed by Karl Koch during the band's 2009 tour, the video features footage of the band backstage and while traveling as well as footage of audience members and fans. Paramore frontwoman Hayley Williams, Sara Bareilles, Josh Freese on drums and a sax-playing Kenny G all make cameo appearances. The video was directed by Johannes Gamble, edited by Hank Friedmann and produced by Dina Ciccotello and Michelle Gonzales.

The second video, part of Vevo's Vevo Go Show series, was released on April 4, 2010, on Vevo, YouTube and the official Weezer website. It shows the band performing the song during an impromptu outdoor show at Santa Monica's Douglas Park on November 27, 2009. This video was directed by David Crabtree and Eric von Doymi, cinematographed by Michael Rizzi and produced through production company Gunslingers.

== Personnel ==
Personnel taken from Raditude CD booklet.

Weezer

- Rivers Cuomo
- Pat Wilson
- Brian Bell
- Scott Shriner

Additional musician

- Josh Freese – drums

Production

- Dr. Luke – producer
- Doug McKean – recording
- Rich Costey – mixing
- Charlie Stavish – mixing assistant
- Dave Collins – mastering

== Chart performance ==
Chart	Peak position
U.S. Billboard Alternative Songs	18
US Billboard Rock Songs	26
