= (If You're Wondering If I Want You To) I Want You To =

Single by Weezer

from the album Raditude
- B-side: "Should I Stay or Should I Go"
- Released: August 18, 2009
- Recorded: July 2009
- Studio: Rubyred (Santa Monica)
- Genre: Power pop
- Length: 3:28
- Label: Geffen
- Songwriters: Rivers Cuomo; Butch Walker
- Producer: Butch Walker

Weezer singles chronology
"Troublemaker" (2008)	"(If You're Wondering If I Want You To) I Want You To" (2009)	"I'm Your Daddy" (2010)

Music video
- "(If You're Wondering If I Want You To) I Want You To" on YouTube

"(If You're Wondering If I Want You To) I Want You To" is a song by American alternative rock/power pop band Weezer. It was released as the first single from the band's seventh studio album Raditude. Initially scheduled to be released to American rock radio on August 25, 2009, the official release of the single to radio was moved up to August 18. The single debuted at number 21 on the Billboard Rock Songs Chart, and in the same position on the Alternative Songs chart. The music video features Odette Yustman. The song was first played live on August 23, 2009, in Toronto, Ontario at the Molson Amphitheatre.

== Reception ==
"(If You're Wondering If I Want You To) I Want You To" has received positive reviews from Billboard Magazine and Allmusic. The song also reached number 36 in the Triple J Hottest 100, 2009.

== Music video ==
The music video was released on October 23. Directed by Marc Webb, the music video revolves around the members of the band living a normal life until a beautiful lady played by Odette Yustman comes to the town. Her callousness and disregard leads to multiple band members being injured while trying to impress her, leaving only frontman Rivers Cuomo unhurt, though upon seeing his injured bandmates, Cuomo rejects the woman, to their approval.

"Marc Webb has created a kind of '50s small town for us to live in," Cuomo told MTV, "And basically it's just populated by the four members of Weezer. So we're just hanging out, driving around, filling up our trucks with gasoline. Basically being guys, and that's what Weezerville is like."

"The idea of the video is really simple: It's a town that's made up of clones of Weezer. There are multiple versions of Brian [Bell] and Patrick [Wilson] and Scott [Shriner] and Rivers, and they're just going about their business, until one day, this woman shows up," Webb continued. "And after that, everything basically goes to hell."

== Track listing ==
Digital download

1. "(If You're Wondering If I Want You To) I Want You To" – 3:28

7-inch picture disc

1. "(If You're Wondering If I Want You To) I Want You To" – 3:28
2. "Should I Stay or Should I Go" (live; The Clash cover) – 3:07

Promo radio CD

1. "(If You're Wondering If I Want You To) I Want You To" – 3:28

Promo 7-inch orange vinyl

1. "(If You're Wondering If I Want You To) I Want You To" – 3:28
2. "I Woke Up in Love This Morning" (The Partridge Family cover) – 3:01

== Personnel ==
Personnel taken from Raditude CD booklet.

Weezer

- Rivers Cuomo
- Pat Wilson
- Brian Bell
- Scott Shriner

Production

- Butch Walker – producer
- Jake Sinclair – recording
- Rich Costey – mixing
- Charlie Stavish – mixing assistant
- Dave Collins – mastering

== Chart performance ==
On the week ending September 12, 2009, "(If You're Wondering If I Want You To) I Want You To" debuted on the Billboard Hot 100 at number 82. It fell off the following week, but on the week ending November 21, 2009 (the same week that their album Raditude debuted at number 7 on the Billboard 200), it re-entered at number 81. On Billboard's Alternative Airplay chart, it peaked at number 2 in its eighth week and stayed there for 12 consecutive weeks behind Muse's "Uprising". It ultimately spent 37 weeks on the chart, a personal record for the band at the time; it was surpassed in 2021 by the 43-week run of "All My Favorite Songs."

=== Weekly charts ===
Chart (2009)	Peak position
Australia (ARIA)	87
Canada Hot 100 (Billboard)	24
Japan Hot 100	16
US Billboard Hot 100	81
US Alternative Airplay (Billboard)	2
US Hot Rock & Alternative Songs (Billboard)	3

=== Year-end charts ===
Chart (2009)	Position
US Alternative Songs (Billboard)	27
US Hot Rock Songs (Billboard)	38
Chart (2010)	Position
US Alternative Songs (Billboard)	8
US Hot Rock Songs (Billboard)	7

== Certifications ==
Region	Certification	Certified units/sales
United States (RIAA)	Platinum	1,000,000^{‡}
^{‡} Sales+streaming figures based on certification alone.
