= Jason Steele (animator) =

American YouTube personality

- Other name: FilmCow
- Occupations: YouTube personality; Animator; Voice actor

YouTube information
- Channel: FilmCow
- Years active: 2008–present
- Genre: Comedy
- Subscribers: 1.88 Million
- Views: 541 million
- Last updated: April 23, 2026
- Website: filmcow.com

Jason Steele is an American animator, voice actor, and filmmaker best known as the creator of the YouTube channel FilmCow. Steele's most popular works include Charlie the Unicorn and Llamas with Hats.

== Career ==
After losing most of their possessions and source of income during Hurricane Katrina, Steele created Charlie the Unicorn as a birthday present for their mother. The animation was uploaded to Newgrounds in 2005, and achieved viral popularity. After attempting to pitch shows to television networks, Steele found financial success through releasing content online, and merchandising.

After releasing several sequels and spinoffs of Charlie the Unicorn, Steele launched a Kickstarter campaign to fund a finale to the series. The campaign was able to double its goal in two days. A followup to the series was released in 2024.

Between 2009 and 2015, Steele produced 12 episodes of the Llamas with Hats series. Steele announced an epilogue to the series in 2024. A Kickstarter campaign to fund the epilogue met its goal of US$22,000 within three hours, and raised over US$250,000 in total.

Steele's other work includes the Marshmallow People series and Shadowstone Park.

== Cultural impact ==
Steele's characters appeared in the music video for Weezer's single "Pork and Beans".

Steele's short film A Delightful Evening, released in March 2011, contributed to the spread of the Thanks, Obama meme. The phrase was used as the video's closing punchline. The meme began trending in August of that year. Barack Obama and his daughters are fans of Steele's work.

In December 2024, Warner Bros. posted an advertisement for their game MultiVersus on Twitter which used audio from one of Steele's videos without prior consent. The tweet was later deleted.
