= This Is Such a Pity =

Promotional single by Weezer

from the album Make Believe
- Released: March 6, 2006
- Recorded: 2004
- Genre: Alternative rock; power pop; new wave
- Length: 3:27
- Label: Geffen
- Songwriter: Rivers Cuomo
- Producer: Rick Rubin

Weezer singles chronology
"Perfect Situation" (2005)	"This Is Such a Pity" (2006)	"Pork and Beans" (2008)

"This Is Such a Pity" is a song by the American alternative rock band Weezer. It is the first and only promotional single from the band's fifth album, Make Believe. It was released to the radio on March 6, 2006.

The liner notes of Make Believe credit Rivers Cuomo as the sole writer of the song, yet Brian Bell came up with the dueling guitar solo. All the keyboards on the song were done using a $75 Casio keyboard. The band tried demoing the song with more expensive Moog keyboards, but ended up being most satisfied with the Casio sound.

Cuomo claims "This is Such a Pity" to be his favorite song from Make Believe. Julian Casablancas of the Strokes has also said it is his favorite Weezer song.

== Track listing ==
Radio Only Promo Single

1. "This is Such a Pity" (Radio Version) - 3:27

== Mash-up video and controversy ==
The song only enjoyed modest success on modern rock radio, partly because the song doesn't have an official accompanying music video.

However, a mash up music video featuring footage from the 1984 breakdancing-themed movie Breakin' was uploaded to YouTube shortly after the song was announced as the fourth single off Make Believe. The clip was created by Rafael Sans, a theology student at Oral Roberts University, and became an Internet phenomenon both among the band's hardcore fan base and throughout the online blogging community. The clip was even featured on the weezer.com homepage.

Yet, soon after its success, the video was banned from YouTube because, as Julie Supan, the site's senior director of marketing explained, "it was likely that the user did not have the proper authorization to upload the video, and the rights-holder contacted YouTube." Despite this, Sans later uploaded the video on Vimeo in 2009.
