= Dreamin' (Weezer song) =

Single by Weezer

from the album Weezer (The Red Album)
- Released: May 27, 2008
- Recorded: 2008
- Genre: Alternative rock
- Length: 5:12
- Label: Geffen
- Songwriter: Rivers Cuomo
- Producers: Rick Rubin; Weezer

Weezer singles chronology
"The Greatest Man That Ever Lived" (2008)	"Dreamin'" (2008)	"Troublemaker" (2008)

"Dreamin'" is the third single (released as an iTunes single) from American alternative rock band Weezer's sixth album, Weezer (2008). It was released in digital form on May 27, 2008.

Weezer guitarist Brian Bell cited "Dreamin'" as his "proudest" moment on the album.

== Background and release ==
In the booklet for Rivers Cuomo's demo compilation album Alone, Cuomo describes how the song "This Is the Way" was originally going to be used for the Red Album over "Dreamin'", then called "Daydreamer". Eventually, Cuomo was able to persuade other band members to choose the "epic, 6-minute, symphonic type of art song" Dreamin' instead.

The song was released as a downloadable song for the game Rock Band and its three sequels along with the songs "Troublemaker" and "The Greatest Man That Ever Lived".

Dreamin' was played live only during the Troublemaker Tour in 2008 and has not been played live ever since.

== Composition and lyrics ==
Brian Bell has commented that this song was "actually based on the sonata form" and the breakdown of the song has a formal name ("The Dream Sequence").

The song mentions the Widener Library Stacks at Harvard University where the composer Rivers Cuomo attended and graduated from.

== Track listing ==
1. "Dreamin'" – 5:12

== Personnel ==
- Rivers Cuomo – lead guitar, lead vocals
- Patrick Wilson – percussion, backing vocals
- Brian Bell – rhythm guitar, Lead/backing vocals
- Scott Shriner – bass guitar, backing vocals
