= Llamas with Hats =

Adult animated web series

- Written by: Jason Steele
- Directed by: Jason Steele
- Starring: Chris Alex and Jason Steele
- Music by: Jason Steele
- No. of episodes: 13

Production
- Producer: Jason Steele
- Production company: FilmCow

Original release
- Release: February 19, 2009 – September 28, 2024

Llamas with Hats is a black comedy adult animated web series produced by FilmCow, an independent company created by Jason Steele after the success of his viral short film Charlie the Unicorn. The first episode was released in 2009, with twelve episodes total. The first video introduces Carl and Paul, two llamas who share a house, and focuses on Paul's reaction to Carl's murder of a human. It became progressively darker as time went on, with the twelfth (and initially final) episode culminating in Carl's suicide some time after Paul has died. A thirteenth and final episode was released in 2024, serving as an epilogue.

== Characters ==
Carl, voiced by Chris Alex, is a grey llama who wears a green hat. In episode 4, he describes himself as "a dangerous sociopath with a long history of violence".

Paul, voiced by Jason Steele, is a beige llama who wears a red hat with a flower on it.

== Plot ==
The first video opens with Paul confronting Carl over the dead human body he has discovered in their living room. Paul questions Carl and discovers that he ate the dead man's hands after murdering him. Carl's actions escalate with each episode. In the second, Carl murders several people on a cruise ship before eventually causing its destruction with no survivors, as he disabled all the other lifeboats. The third has Carl destroy an unnamed South American country's government and gather the bodies of orphans to construct a "meat dragon". In the fourth, Carl destroys the city in which he and Paul live with a nuclear weapon and ties the citizens' faces to balloons, which rain down from the sky, which Carl claims is a surprise for Paul's birthday despite the fact it isn't his birthday, leading Paul to declare his intention to leave.

The fifth opens with Carl detailing a seemingly harmless day, only to reveal he has created a rift in the fabric of the universe from which he may harvest millions of severed baby hands. Paul is not as horrified by this as he was by Carl's previous atrocities, citing that he was "expecting worse". In the sixth, Paul follows up on his intention to leave expressed in episode four, while Carl has completed the meat dragon mentioned in episode three. In the seventh, Carl makes a mask of Paul, trying and failing to replace him with a sheep which he puts the mask on. In the eighth, Carl visits Paul's apartment in an attempt to reconcile, sending him an "apology piano" and "swan piano". He talks to himself while mimicking Paul, alternating between his and Paul's voice.

Episodes nine through eleven show Carl's further mental decay, hallucinating that the Paul mask became possessed, and later getting deluded that the mask was Paul, which convinces Carl (who was, in reality, convincing himself) to "finish [his] work". This leads to the destruction of all life on Earth by episode 11, including Paul, whose remains are found by Carl in episode 12. With his delusions ceased and no purpose left, Carl tearfully commits suicide by jumping off a bridge into a river, while screaming his own name in an imitation of Paul's voice. The epilogue takes a delve into Carl's psyche during his final moments as he drowns in the river, in which he wonders, as a result of his horrible actions, if he truly is beyond redemption.

== Other videos ==
Two other videos under the Llamas with Hats name (outside of the main series) have been released.

=== Llamas with Hats 1-12: Re-Edited for Brand Conscientiousness ===
On June 22, 2023, following the original Llamas with Hats video having an 18+ age restriction lifted from it by YouTube and having its monetization reinstated after a previous demonetization, a video was released on the FilmCow channel titled "Llamas with Hats 1-12: Re-Cut for Brand Conscientiousness", where a personification of YouTube, presented as a floating YouTube "play button" logo wearing a fedora, voiced by Jason Steele, feels that it wasn't "totally wrong" in age-restricting and demonetizing the original video, and presents an advertiser-friendly re-edit of the original 12 episodes where all references of murder, violence, and other horrific actions of Carl are dubbed over with advertiser-friendly topics, most prominently consumerism (primarily references to buying bottled water). By episode 5, the personified YouTube logo, finding Carl and Paul's argument "upsetting", takes the viewers into an "endless void", which also skips over the majority of the sixth episode, with footage of human flesh edited out and replaced with bottled water (similarly to the end of episode 5, where the severed baby hands are also replaced with bottles of water). The remaining episodes begin to become more distorted and bizarre with more appearances of consumerism-promoting imagery and bottled water as the personified YouTube logo makes its way through the remaining edited episodes.

=== The "Llamas with Hats" Guy's Final Moments ===
On May 3, 2024, a video titled "The 'Llamas with Hats' Guy's Final Moments" was released on the FilmCow channel, which presents a purported audio recording of Carl's human victim from the first episode of Llamas with Hats in the moments from his entrance of the two llamas' home leading up to his murder at the hands of Carl; here, it is revealed that the man went to the house to install a cable box.

== Production ==
Steele recorded the audio for the series using Amadeus Pro and edited it all together in Final Cut Pro. Adobe Flash was used to draw individual characters, while Adobe Photoshop was used to draw the backgrounds for the series. The program Magpie Pro 2 was used for lip syncing, and the series itself was animated in Adobe After Effects.

Llamas with Hats was initially envisioned to be a five-part series, with the finale culminating in Carl blowing up the Earth. However, many fans correctly predicted this, and Steele was "embarrassed [his] plan for the series was that predictable" and scrapped this original idea. Steele's inspiration for the series' tonal shift was because "The only way for Carl to continue surprising people was for him to actually do something surprising." Steele clarified that, despite the darker premise, episodes five to twelve were "all still a comedy. You may not find it funny and I'm sure a lot of people won't. But imagine talking with a friend and they mention Llamas with Hats. They haven't seen any of the episodes beyond the fourth. Now explain to them what happens in the series after that."

Steele, when interviewed with E.O. Wilson for Good Alice's Handbook of Midwifery, stated that The Residents tonal-poem cover of the Robert Johnson song, "Dirty Gumbo", was used as his artistic muse during the early creative process.

== Reception ==
Writing for The Irish Times, Donald Clarke called it a "superb series of absurd snippets".

PopDust wrote, "'Happy Tree Friends' and 'Llamas With Hats' won't live up to the decades-long sensation of The Simpsons or even the progressive wit of more recent adult cartoons like Big Mouth. But, with too much time on our hands right now, it's been fun to reminisce on bygone Internet trends that defined so much of our youth—gory animals among them."

In 2023, LADbible recalled that the series "quickly became an internet classic, gaining a cult following among teenage Millennials" and stated it could "only really be described as a zoological acid trip."

== In popular culture ==
The American television series The Good Wife made reference to the series in the episode "Killer Song," which aired on March 29, 2011. The series has received over 120 million views on YouTube.

== Video game ==
A mobile video game titled "Llamas with Hats: Cruise Catastrophe" was released in 2013.

== Storybook ==
A storybook called, "Llamas with Hats: Babies" was released in August 2019, nearly 4 years after the finale was released on YouTube.
