= Perfect Situation =

Single by Weezer

from the album Make Believe
- Released: October 11, 2005
- Recorded: 2004
- Genre: Alternative rock; power pop
- Length: 4:14
- Label: Geffen
- Songwriter: Rivers Cuomo
- Producer: Rick Rubin

Weezer singles chronology
"We Are All on Drugs" (2005)	"Perfect Situation" (2005)	"This Is Such a Pity" (2006)

Music video
- "Perfect Situation" on YouTube

"Perfect Situation" is a song by American alternative rock band Weezer. It was released to radio on October 11, 2005, as the third single from the band's fifth album Make Believe, following "Beverly Hills" and "We Are All on Drugs".

The song is also one of the band's most successful songs to date, topping the Billboard Modern Rock Tracks for four weeks, outlasting the one-week run atop the chart of "Beverly Hills", although it didn't gain the former's massive pop success, reaching No. 51 on the Billboard Hot 100.

== Radio edit ==
The radio edit of this song features a shortened intro, a synth track on the first and second chorus (the album version only has it on the second chorus), a reworked "oh-oh" chorus and the added backup vocals of "perfect situation" over the outro. The radio edit is eight seconds shorter than the album version. The reworked chorus that appears in the radio edit was one of two ways Cuomo originally wrote the song. When touring in summer 2005, when the band prompted the crowd to sing along, they oddly enough sang it in the other way Cuomo had written it (different from the record version). Cuomo stated in an interview during the band's 2005 performance at the AOL Sessions as saying "Well, if these ten thousand people think it should go this way, maybe we should go back and re-record it."

The alternate version was put on later pressings of the album with the full intro, reworked chorus and outro.

== Music video ==
The video, directed by Marc Webb, premiered on November 11, 2005, and features actress Elisha Cuthbert as the lead singer of Weeze, a fictional predecessor to Weezer, who is eventually replaced by actual frontman Rivers Cuomo. The video also features a cameo by the band's webmaster/band photographer/archivist and longtime close friend Karl Koch and like the "Beverly Hills" video, the band invited actual Weezer fans via casting call to be in the video's crowd scenes. A new cover for Make Believe was created for the video of Perfect Situation, replacing Cuomo with Cuthbert, as well as showing the fictional name "Weeze".

== Charts ==
=== Weekly charts ===
Weekly chart performance for "Perfect Situation"
Chart (2006)	Peak position
Canada Rock Top 30 (Radio & Records)	2
US Billboard Hot 100	51
US Alternative Airplay (Billboard)	1

=== Year-end charts ===
2005 year-end chart performance for "Perfect Situation"
Chart (2005)	Position
US Modern Rock Tracks (Billboard)	100

2006 year-end chart performance for "Perfect Situation"
Chart (2006)	Position
Canada Rock (Radio & Records)	15
US Alternative Songs (Billboard)	8

== Certifications ==
Certifications for "Perfect Situation"
Region	Certification	Certified units/sales
United States (RIAA)	Platinum	1,000,000^{‡}
^{‡} Sales+streaming figures based on certification alone.

== Personnel ==
Personnel are taken from the Make Believe CD booklet.

Weezer

- Brian Bell
- Rivers Cuomo
- Scott Shriner
- Pat Wilson

Technical personnel

- Rick Rubin – production
- Chad Bramford – additional production
- Weezer – additional production
- Neal Avron – mixing
