= Raditude =

Studio album by Weezer
- Released: November 3, 2009
- Recorded: November 2008 - January 2009; Summer 2009
- Studios: Rubyred (Santa Monica); The Village (Los Angeles); Sound City (Van Nuys); The Document Room (Malibu); Zeitgeist (Los Angeles); Conway (Los Angeles); The Thom Thom Club (Santa Monica)
- Genres: Power pop; pop rock
- Length: 34:34
- Labels: DGC; Interscope
- Producers: Dr. Luke; Jacknife Lee; Polow da Don; Butch Walker; Rivers Cuomo

Weezer chronology
Christmas with Weezer (2008)	Raditude (2009)	Hurley (2010)

Singles from Raditude
- 1. "(If You're Wondering If I Want You To) I Want You To" Released: August 18, 2009; 2. "I'm Your Daddy" Released: January 20, 2010

Raditude is the seventh studio album by American rock band Weezer, released on November 3, 2009, and is their final album on DGC and Interscope Records. The title of the album was suggested to Weezer frontman Rivers Cuomo by actor Rainn Wilson. The album's first single, "(If You're Wondering If I Want You To) I Want You To", was released in August 2009. The album debuted at number seven on the Billboard 200. The album's cover artwork is a photo of a dog named Sidney, originally published in the August 2009 issue of National Geographic.

The album was initially released in Australia on October 30, 2009. It was made available in the United Kingdom on November 2, 2009, and the following day in the United States. It opened at number seven on the Billboard 200, selling 66,000 copies in its first week of availability. As of September 2010, it has sold 240,000 copies.

== Background and recording ==
Knowledge of the record was first made public by Billboard.com, who reported that Weezer was to head into the studio in early November 2008 to record a seventh album. A YouTube post titled "Let's Write A Sawng: Step 16," uploaded on November 15, 2008, showed frontman Rivers Cuomo in the studio with producer Jacknife Lee short-listing three songs from a list of 23, adding speculation to the recording of a seventh album or new B-sides.

In May, the band's webmaster and archivist Karl Koch revealed that the album had no set release date, and that the band would be recording additional material. He revealed that Cuomo would be the sole lead vocalist on this album unlike their previous album, 2008's Weezer (also known as the Red Album). In early summer of 2009, session drummer Josh Freese joined Weezer, with regular drummer Patrick Wilson taking over guitar duties for Cuomo. Freese performed with the band at the KROQ Weenie Roast. In an interview for the event, the band revealed that the new album would be released in summer 2009.

On July 24, Weezer played three new songs in Korea at the Jisan Valley Rock Festival: "Can't Stop Partying", "I'm Your Daddy", and "The Girl Got Hot". "Can't Stop Partying" had previously been released in demo form on Cuomo's Alone II album in 2008. While performing "The Girl Got Hot" on July 26, 2009, at the Fuji Rock Festival, Cuomo revealed that Weezer's seventh studio album would be released in October 2009. August 4, 2009, saw the final recording sessions for the album, with mixing of the disc beginning two days later.

"Can't Stop Partying" was co-written with hip-hop producer Jermaine Dupri, and features rapper Lil Wayne. "Put Me Back Together" was co-written with The All-American Rejects members Tyson Ritter and Nick Wheeler.

Rhythm guitarist Brian Bell stated that he had reservations about the inclusion of outside collaborators and the album's overall mainstream pop aesthetic. In a 2010 interview, Bell revealed that he "[had] a conversation with Rivers about [Raditude]. And he said, to put my mind at ease, that this is just one album out of many more that we are going to make in our career. When I heard that, I was like, okay, cool, well that’s a great way to think of it. We’re just trying something and this is just one record out of many more. When I heard that, I was fine with it."

== Promotion ==
On August 14, 2009, MTV confirmed that the first single, "(If You're Wondering If I Want You To) I Want You To", was to be released on American rock radio on August 25. The track leaked less than a week after the announcement, and the official release of the single to radio was moved up to Tuesday, August 18. A music video for the single was filmed with director Marc Webb and co-starring Odette Yustman.

Via updates on their official website, the band revealed in August 2009 that the album would be called Raditude and released on October 27. This date was pushed back a week to November 3. On October 13, the band announced "The Weezer Raditude Club," which allowed customers to pre-order Raditude and gain access to exclusive tracks each week leading up to the album's release.

Weezer recorded a promotional performance for Sessions@AOL. Guests included Kenny G, Chamillionaire and Sara Bareilles. Kenny G's contribution was a solo after the second chorus of "I'm Your Daddy". Prior to the performance he said that he knew nothing of Weezer. Although Cuomo and Kenny G live near each other in Malibu they had never met before the recording, which was done in one take. Kenny G commented in the green room on the lack of rehearsal, "...that's OK. I'm a professional."

Raditude was sold in conjunction with a Weezer version of the Snuggie, a popular wearable blanket.

The album debuted at number seven on the Billboard 200, selling 66,000 copies in its first week, only about half as many copies as the band's previous album, Weezer, sold in its first week in 2008.

While Weezer did not necessarily promote the album live (this can likely be attributed to the cancellation of the majority of the album's promotional tour), handfuls of songs from this album were still performed throughout 2009 and some of 2010, and the lead single has become one of their more frequently played live songs in recent years.

== Critical reception ==
Professional ratings
Aggregate scores
Source	Rating
AnyDecentMusic?	4.8/10
Metacritic	57/100
Review scores
Source	Rating
AllMusic	3.5/5 stars
The A.V. Club	C+
Chicago Tribune	3.5/4 stars
Entertainment Weekly	B+
Los Angeles Times	2/4 stars
NME	6/10
Pitchfork	4.5/10
Q	3/5 stars
Rolling Stone	3.5/5 stars
Spin	6/10

According to the review aggregator Metacritic, Raditude received "mixed or average reviews" based on a weighted average score of 57 out of 100 from 25 critic scores.

A positive review came from Matt Collar of AllMusic, who wrote that "Musically, Raditude really sounds like vintage Weezer, but never in a pandering, played-out way", praising "I'm Your Daddy" and "The Girl Got Hot" for being "as sparkling with creative enthusiasm as anything the band has done since 'Buddy Holly'." "Songs about going to meet your girlfriend's parents or how the ugly duckling in junior high school suddenly turned into a double-take ice queen, are an odd thing for men pushing 40 to sing about. But perhaps because Weezer are as sexually threatening as melted Solero, such an approach sounds uniquely stylized rather than criminally creepy," Kerrang! reviewer Ian Winwood remarked. Noting the backlash the album had received, Rob Sheffield of Rolling Stone wrote that "when it comes to taunting and baiting the crowd, [frontman Rivers] Cuomo makes every other rock star out there look like a dilettante", while praising the album itself as being "full of gloriously cheesy Weezer tunes".

Scott Heisel of Alternative Press gave Raditude a mixed review, calling it "the antithesis of everything you loved about the first two albums" and writing that the album "takes a severe and almost irreversible nosedive" following the third track "The Girl Got Hot". Rob Mitchum of Pitchfork criticized Cuomo's lyrics for seemingly being "stuck in an eternal puberty, forever 13—confused, horny, hyperbolic, obsessed with brand names", and concluded that "the record's teen-boy empowerment message doesn't have much to offer anyone over 13 years old". Spencer Kornhaber of Spin wrote that the album "might be enjoyed for what it is—extremely catchy, fist-pumping pop—and for what it represents: escapism", but felt that "the second half sags, the ballads bore, and weirdly, it's too short". Huw Jones of Slant Magazine panned the album as "a thematically vacant and sonically uninspired collection of ditties tailor-made for mainstream radio" that contains "an abhorrent cocktail of deluded lyricism and indolent musicianship." Evan Sawdey of PopMatters felt that Raditude should be judged for being "a collection of straight-faced, irony-free pop songs written by a guy who knows his way around a hook", concluding, "As a Weezer album, it is nothing short of a profound disappointment. By any other standard, it's just the worst album of the year."

In 2014, Tom Hawking of Flavorwire included the album in his list of "The 50 Worst Albums Ever Made".

== Track listing ==
No.	Title	Writer(s)	Producer(s)	Length
1.	"(If You're Wondering If I Want You To) I Want You To"	Rivers Cuomo; Butch Walker	Walker	3:28
2.	"I'm Your Daddy"	Cuomo; Lukasz Gottwald	Dr. Luke	3:08
3.	"The Girl Got Hot"	Cuomo; Walker	Walker	3:14
4.	"Can't Stop Partying" (featuring Lil Wayne)	Cuomo; Jermaine Dupri	Polow da Don	4:22
5.	"Put Me Back Together"	Cuomo; Tyson Ritter; Nick Wheeler	Walker	3:15
6.	"Trippin' Down the Freeway"	Cuomo	Jacknife Lee	3:40
7.	"Love Is the Answer"	Cuomo; Lee	Lee	3:43
8.	"Let It All Hang Out"	Cuomo; Dupri; Lee	Walker	3:17
9.	"In the Mall"	Patrick Wilson	Lee	2:39
10.	"I Don't Want to Let You Go"	Cuomo	Lee	3:48

Deluxe edition
No.	Title	Writer(s)	Length
1.	"Get Me Some"	Cuomo; Gottwald	3:36
2.	"Run Over by a Truck"	Cuomo	3:33
3.	"The Prettiest Girl in the Whole Wide World"	Cuomo	4:00
4.	"The Underdogs"	Cuomo; Kazuhiro Hara	4:40

Amazon MP3 exclusive version bonus tracks

- "Turn Me Round" (recorded in 2003) – 3:10

International bonus tracks

- "I Woke Up in Love This Morning" (Japan only; recorded in 2003, Rivers Cuomo and Sloan) – 3:04
- "Turn Me Round" (recorded in 2003; UK, Russia & Australia only) – 3:09

iTunes bonus tracks

- "The Story of My Life" (recorded in 2003) – 3:15
- "Kids/Poker Face" – 4:58

iTunes Pass: The Weezer Raditude Club Tracks (exclusive to the iTunes Pass)

- "Should I Stay or Should I Go" (live at Virgin Mobile FreeFest '09; cover of The Clash) – 3:07
- "I Hear Bells" (recorded in 2000) – 2:44
- "Put Me Back Together" (Rich Costey mix) – 3:15
- "Cold Dark World" (Rivers lead vocal; originally featured on the Red Album with Scott Shriner on vocals) – 3:52
- "Across the Sea" (live song from the Japan 2005 Tour) – 4:32
- Tour Video Introductions from the US 2009 Tour – 4:46
- "The Good Life" (live; video) – 4:38
- "(If You're Wondering If I Want You To) I Want You To" (Steve Aoki remix) – 6:36
- "The Prettiest Girl in the Whole Wide World" (Karlophone Remix) – 4:21
- "I'm Your Daddy" (Pat Wilson remix) – 3:08
- "(If You're Wondering If I Want You To) I Want You To" music video – 3:31
- "Can't Stop Partying" (Coconut Teaser Mix) – 3:32
- "Love Is the Answer" (Laid Back Mix) – 3:01
- Live Video from Rehearsals – 5:29
- Making of Raditude (video) – 12:18
- "I’m Your Daddy" (Serban Ghenea mix) – 3:08

"Can't Stop Partying", "I Don't Want to Let You Go", and "The Prettiest Girl in the Whole Wide World" were previously released in demo form on Cuomo's compilation album Alone II: The Home Recordings of Rivers Cuomo. Sugar Ray previously recorded the track "Love Is the Answer" on their 2009 album Music for Cougars with a guest appearance by Cuomo.

== Personnel ==
Personnel taken from Raditude CD booklet.

Weezer

- Rivers Cuomo
- Pat Wilson
- Brian Bell
- Scott Shriner

Additional musicians

- Lil Wayne – vocals (track 4)
- Josh Freese – drums (tracks 2, 3, 8)
- Jacknife Lee – keyboards, backing vocals, guitar, percussion, and programming (tracks 7, 9, 10, "Get Me Some", "Run Over By A Truck", "The Prettiest Girl In The Whole Wide World", and "The Underdogs")
- Amrita Sen – vocals (track 7)
- Nishat Khan – additional vocals, sitar (track 7)
- Aaron Suplizio – additional bass guitar (track 7)
- Sim Grewall – additional percussion (track 7)

Design

- Andy Mueller – art direction and design
- Johannes Gamble – art direction and design
- Morning Breath Inc. – cover co-design
- Jason Neely – dog photography
- Sean Murphy – band photography
- Karl Koch – additional photography
- Daniel Field – additional photography

Production

- Butch Walker – producer (tracks 1, 3, 5, 8)
- Jacknife Lee – producer (tracks 6, 7, 9; "I Don't Want to Let You Go", "Get Me Some", "Run Over By A Truck", "The Prettiest Girl In The Whole Wide World", and "The Underdogs")
- Dr. Luke – producer (track 2)
- Polow da Don – producer (track 4)
- Shawn Everett – additional producer (track 7), drum & guitar recording (tracks 6, 7, 9)
- Ananda Sen – additional producer (track 7)
- Tom McFall – recording (Jacknife Lee sessions)
- Sam Bell – additional engineering and editing (tracks 6, 7, 9; "I Don't Want to Let You Go", "Get Me Some", "Run Over By A Truck", "The Prettiest Girl In The Whole Wide World", and "The Underdogs")
- Jake Sinclair – recording (tracks 1, 3, 5, 8)
- Joe Zook – recording (tracks 3, 8)
- Doug McKean – recording (track 2)
- Rich Costey – mixing
- Charlie Stavish – mixing assistant
- Serban Ghenea – mixing (track 5)
- John Hanes – mixing engineer (track 5)
- Tim Roberts – mixing assistant (track 5)
- Joshua Minyard – mixing assistant
- George Gumbs – mixing assistant
- Douglas Forsdick – studio tech
- Henry Trejo – guitar tech
- Mike Fasano – drum tech
- Dave Collins – mastering

== Charts ==
Chart (2009)	Peak position
Australian Albums Chart	36
Canadian Albums Chart	10
French Albums Chart	119
German Albums Chart	94
Norwegian Albums Chart	36
US Billboard 200	7
US Billboard Alternative Albums	1
US Billboard Rock Albums	1
