= We Are All on Drugs =

Single by Weezer

from the album Make Believe
- Released: July 12, 2005
- Recorded: 2004
- Genre: Alternative rock
- Length: 3:35
- Label: Geffen
- Songwriter: Rivers Cuomo
- Producer: Rick Rubin

Weezer singles chronology
"Beverly Hills" (2005)	"We Are All on Drugs" (2005)	"Perfect Situation" (2005)

Music video
- "We Are All On Drugs" on YouTube

"We Are All on Drugs" is a song by American alternative rock band Weezer. It was released as the second single from the band's 2005 album, Make Believe. "We Are All on Drugs" was released to radio on July 12, 2005. The song is not specifically about drugs. Rather, songwriter Rivers Cuomo has said that it is more generally about the overstimulated society addicted to the internet, gambling, drugs and relationships.

== Alternate lyrics ==
The song went into mixing with two lines in the bridge, "I want to confiscate your drugs/ I don't think I can get enough", and was eventually released that way on early printings of the album, and on published sheet music. It was replaced on future printings (as well as on the CD single) with "I want to reach a higher plane/ where things will never be the same."

An edited version of the song for MTV "We Are All in Love", changed "on drugs" to "in love" in the chorus. Patrick Wilson suggested having the edit be "We Are All on Hugs", which Cuomo thought was too "quirky". Brian Bell suggested the "in love" edit. Despite this edit the headline "WE ARE ALL ON DRUGS" still remains on the newspaper Cuomo reads at the barber shop in the music video.

== Music video ==
The music video for the song features Rivers Cuomo wandering through a world where people appear to be on drugs (with many of the extras miming to the lyrics). The video was directed by Justin Francis. The video was the most complex shoot in Weezer history, spanning two days, having various actors, special effects and at one point according to Brian Bell, nearly being shut down by the police. Rick Rubin, the song's producer, makes a cameo as a firefighter towards the end.

== Inspiration ==
Cuomo said about the song:

I was living in an apartment above the Sunset Strip, and every Friday and Saturday night I'd hear people cruising and partying, and hooting and hollering. And I went to sleep one night and I heard those sounds all through the night, in my dreams. I had this dream about a kid on the Metro bus, blasting hip hop into his brain through his headphones. And the music sounded so decadent and overstimulating, and I woke up in the midst of that dream, in a haze, and immediately said to myself, "Man, we're all on drugs!" And I instantly knew that would be a cool song.

In a May 9, 2005 interview with Y100, Cuomo talked about the song: "Don't take it literally...I'm singing more about the fact [of] how addicted we all are to stimulating ourselves, and over-stimulating ourselves with music, or whatever it is in our lives. [It's] not necessarily about drugs."

== Reception ==
AllMusic writer Stephen Thomas Erlewine thought that "We Are All on Drugs" was one of the three highlights on the album.

== Track listing ==
UK retail 7" (Pink vinyl)

1. "We Are All on Drugs"
2. "Beverly Hills" (Urbanix Mix)

UK retail CD

1. "We Are All on Drugs"
2. "Beverly Hills" (Urbanix Mix)
3. "Burndt Jamb" (Live)
4. "We Are All on Drugs" (CD-ROM video)

The video featured on the CD is the song playing over a re-edited version of Grim Reaper's 1985 video "Fear No Evil"

== Personnel ==
Personnel are taken from the Make Believe CD booklet.

Weezer

- Brian Bell
- Rivers Cuomo
- Scott Shriner
- Pat Wilson

Technical personnel

- Rick Rubin – production
- Chad Bramford – additional production
- Weezer – additional production
- Rich Costey – mixing

== Charts ==
=== Weekly charts ===
Weekly chart performance for "We Are All on Drugs"
Chart (2005)	Peak position
Canada Rock Top 30 (Radio & Records)	12
Ireland (IRMA)	46
Scotland Singles (OCC)	36
UK Singles (OCC)	47
US Alternative Airplay (Billboard)	10

=== Year-end charts ===
Year-end chart performance for "We Are All on Drugs"
Chart (2005)	Position
US Modern Rock Tracks (Billboard)	54
