= Make Believe (Weezer album) =

Studio album by Weezer
- Released: May 10, 2005
- Recorded: 2003–2005
- Studios: Cello (Hollywood); Grandmaster (Los Angeles); Henson (Hollywood); Rick Rubin's home studio (Los Angeles)
- Genres: Alternative rock; power pop; pop punk; new wave
- Length: 45:09
- Label: Geffen
- Producer: Rick Rubin

Weezer chronology
The Lion and the Witch (2002)	Make Believe (2005)	Weezer (2008)

Singles from Make Believe
- 1. "Beverly Hills" Released: March 28, 2005; 2. "We Are All on Drugs" Released: July 12, 2005; 3. "Perfect Situation" Released: October 11, 2005

Make Believe is the fifth studio album by American rock band Weezer. It was released on May 10, 2005, by Geffen Records. The album was considered to be a return to some of the emotionally vulnerable lyrics of Weezer's previous releases, and due to the strength of the hit single "Beverly Hills", the album was a commercial success, peaking at number two on the US Billboard 200 and number eleven on the UK Albums Chart. In addition, "Beverly Hills" earned Weezer their first Grammy nomination for Best Rock Song. Despite this, Make Believe received mixed reviews from critics and fans, although it has remained a consistent seller. The recording process of Make Believe began prior to the release of their previous album, Maladroit; however, it was prolonged compared to the recording of most of Weezer's previous albums, and lasted for almost three years.

== Background and recording ==
Across 2002 and early 2003, demos for possible use on Weezer's fifth album would be uploaded to weezer.com's audio/video page. After touring and returning to S.I.R. Studios for additional sessions, the band ultimately decided to start from scratch with a fresh group of songs. 28 songs in all were uploaded on the website (and can still be found on various fan sites) yet none made the actual album. This batch of songs is commonly referred to as "The A5 Demos" or "Early Album 5" amongst fans. During the recording process, Rivers Cuomo's discovery of meditation due to the influence of producer Rick Rubin was beginning to take on a greater influence on the album's content. For instance, "Pardon Me" was written after a ten-day guided meditation course in which he learned the ancient techniques of vipassana (insight meditation) and metta (loving kindness) which encourages those who practice to "seek pardon from all those who I have hurt in action, speech or thought." He also claimed the title of the album came to him while meditating.

Make Believe marks a return to Cuomo's more personal songwriting style after taking a more distant approach on the previous two albums. "The Other Way" was written for Cuomo's ex-girlfriend Jennifer Chiba after her then-boyfriend, singer-songwriter Elliott Smith, committed suicide. Cuomo said, "I wanted to console her, but I was confused and skeptical about my own motives for wanting to do so, so I wrote that song about that." "We Are All on Drugs" was inspired by Cuomo hearing party-goers on the Sunset Strip. "Hold Me" was written during a songwriting experiment in which Cuomo fasted for 24 hours and then wrote a song. In addition, early in the recording process, Rubin told Cuomo to "write a Billy Joel or Elton John type of song." The result of Rubin's request was "Haunt You Every Day", which was the first song that Cuomo wrote entirely on piano.

As the band was working on the album, a deal was struck to have "My Best Friend" be included in the film Shrek 2, but this deal was scrapped because the makers of the film didn't think it fit to the timings of the visuals. The Counting Crows song "Accidentally in Love" took the place of "My Best Friend."

Hundreds of songs were demoed during the three-year period of making the album. Despite the abundance of releasable material, this album did not feature any B-side releases. Of the notable unreleased material, partial rough versions of "You're the One" and "Love Is the Answer" can be heard on the "Making of Make Believe" special feature on the disc's Enhanced CD feature. A cover of Toni Braxton's "Un-Break My Heart" was in consideration for the album and later for a soundtrack, although it would only see release five years later on the Death to False Metal album. Six other Make Believe era outtakes, including three which were contenders for the final album, would also see release on Death to False Metal.

While deciding on the name of the album, one of the title suggestions given by Patrick Wilson was One Thousand Soviet Children Marching Towards the Sun. Another suggestion was Either Way I'm Fine, something Cuomo often said during the sessions when discussing changing elements of a song or sound.

== Artwork and packaging ==
Much of the album's art direction was handled by Francesca Restrepo, with photography from Karl Koch and Sean Murphy. The album cover was styled in a similar manner to both the band's debut album ("The Blue Album") and the band's 2001 album ("The Green Album"). It featured Wilson, Cuomo, Scott Shriner and Brian Bell standing left-to-right in front of a black backdrop, with illustrations by Carson Ellis.

The liner notes feature a monologue from William Shakespeare's play The Tempest. The monologue is taken from Act 5, Scene 1 of the play, in which Prospero gives up his magic. This had prompted many fans to speculate that Make Believe would be the band's final album. The monologue is as follows:

This rough magic

I here abjure, and, when I have required some heavenly music, which even now I do, To work mine end upon their senses that This airy charm is for, I'll break my staff, Bury it certain fathoms in the earth, And deeper than did ever plummet sound

I'll drown my book.

== Reception ==
Professional ratings
Aggregate scores
Source	Rating
Metacritic	52/100
Review scores
Source	Rating
AllMusic	3/5 stars
Blender	3/5 stars
Entertainment Weekly	B−
The Guardian	3/5 stars
Los Angeles Times	2.5/4 stars
Mojo	3/5 stars
NME	5/10
Pitchfork	0.4/10
Q	4/5 stars
Rolling Stone	4/5 stars

=== Critical reception ===
According to the review aggregator Metacritic, Make Believe received "mixed or average reviews" based on a weighted average score of 52 out of 100 from 25 critic scores. Some publications like AllMusic and Rolling Stone lauded the album, comparing it to the band's earlier release Pinkerton in terms of its songwriting, sound and initial critical reaction. AllMusic described it as "[a] return to musical, emotional bloodletting", although the lyrics were noticeably simpler than before. IGN gave it a 9.3 out of 10, declaring that "The Weezer you've been missing is back", calling it the band's third great album.

Other reviewers panned the album. Pitchfork's Rob Mitchum awarded the album a 0.4 out of 10, stating, "Sometimes an album is just awful. Make Believe is one of those albums." Adam Downer of Sputnikmusic gave the album a 1.5 out of 5, calling it "a whirlwind of mediocrity and self deprecating lyrics." Sal Cinquemani of Slant Magazine gave the album 2.5 out 5 stars, saying, "The truth is that any Weezer copycat band could have made this record. Our protagonist, Rivers Cuomo, is once again subtly self-deprecating and slightly defeated, but his power-chord-laden pop lacks the conviction of The Blue Album, Pinkerton, and, to a lesser extent, even The Green Album and Maladroit."

=== Commercial performance ===
The album debuted on the Billboard 200 albums chart at number two, selling 193,000 copies its first week.

== Track listing ==
All tracks are written by Rivers Cuomo.

No.	Title	Length
1.	"Beverly Hills"	3:16
2.	"Perfect Situation"	4:15
3.	"This Is Such a Pity"	3:24
4.	"Hold Me"	4:22
5.	"Peace"	3:53
6.	"We Are All on Drugs"	3:35
7.	"The Damage in Your Heart"	4:02
8.	"Pardon Me"	4:15
9.	"My Best Friend"	2:47
10.	"The Other Way"	3:16
11.	"Freak Me Out"	3:26
12.	"Haunt You Every Day"	4:37
Total length:		45:09

UK and Japan bonus tracks
No.	Title	Length
13.	"Butterfly" (live)	3:57
14.	"Island in the Sun" (live)	3:44
15.	"Burndt Jamb" (live)	4:26
Total length:		57:16

- The UK and Japan versions of the album came with two additional bonus tracks: live versions of "Butterfly" and "Island in the Sun", whose original recordings appeared on Pinkerton and Weezer (2001), respectively. The Japanese version also featured a live version of the song "Burndt Jamb", which had appeared on Maladroit.

== Reissues ==
The wrong version of "We Are All on Drugs" appears on the first CD release and all vinyl releases of Make Believe. It was later replaced with the correct version on subsequent CD releases. The two versions of the song are sonically identical, but two lines of lyrics are different. The incorrect lyrics on the first CD release and the vinyl releases are: "I want to confiscate your drugs, I don't think I can get enough", whereas the correct lyrics on subsequent CD releases are "I want to reach a higher plane, where things will never be the same."

Shedding light on the many versions of the album that were released, Weezer archivist Karl Koch posted the following on the band's website on June 20, 2007:

Originally, the album was released (May 11, 2005, contrary to what iTunes says) and that was that. But then it was discovered that there were 2 problems. The wrong version of 'We Are All on Drugs" was included, and there was a minor audio problem in "This Is Such a Pity". (Both of these things were things that the band could hear, but if you hadn't heard the song before, you wouldn't know what was 'wrong'.)

So, early on, a second version of the album was issued with the 'Drugs' and 'Pity' corrected. It's not known if any of the original copies were returned and destroyed at that point. There's likely plenty of both of these first two versions out there, as Make Believe sold half a million copies in a matter of weeks (and is currently well over 1 million sold). But then, when it came time for a 3rd single, the band made some changes to "Perfect Situation", changing the "whoa oh" melody and adding the "Perfect Situation" background vocals near the end of the song. This became known as the 'single version' or the 'video version', but the band decided it was better than the original and wanted all further pressings of the album to have this new version instead. So, therefore, a 3rd version of the album was made, and that's the version that's currently on iTunes and in stores (unless they still have very old stock of the CD).

== Personnel ==
Personnel taken from Make Believe CD booklet.

Weezer

- Brian Bell
- Rivers Cuomo
- Scott Shriner
- Pat Wilson

Additional performers

- Stephanie Eitzel – additional vocals on "Beverly Hills"
- Akiko Tarumoto – violin on "The Damage in Your Heart"
- Jason Freese – saxophone on "The Other Way"

Production

- Rick Rubin – producer
- Chad Bamford – additional production, recording
- Weezer – additional production
- Jim Scott – recording
- Josh Abraham – mixing (tracks 3, 7, 9, 11)
- Neal Avron – mixing (tracks 2, 4, 5, 12)
- Rich Costey – mixing (tracks 1, 6, 8)
- Alan Moulder – mixing (track 10)
- Ryan Williams – additional Pro Tools engineering
- Dan Leffeler – assistant engineer
- Andrew Alakiel – assistant engineer
- Kevin Mills – assistant engineer
- Jeremy MacKenzie – assistant engineer
- Claudius Mittendorfer – assistant engineer
- George Gumbs – assistant engineer
- Vlado Meller – mastering

Artwork

- Francesca Restrepo – art direction, design
- Carson Ellis – illustrations
- Sean Murphy – photography
- Karl Koch – studio photograph

== Charts ==
=== Weekly charts ===
Weekly chart performance for Make Believe
Chart (2005–2006)	Peak position
Australian Albums (ARIA)	19
Austrian Albums (Ö3 Austria)	17
Belgian Albums (Ultratop Flanders)	58
Belgian Albums (Ultratop Wallonia)	84
Canadian Albums (Billboard)	1
Dutch Albums (Album Top 100)	82
Finnish Albums (Suomen virallinen lista)	13
French Albums (SNEP)	45
German Albums (Offizielle Top 100)	32
Irish Albums (IRMA)	7
New Zealand Albums (RMNZ)	20
Norwegian Albums (VG-lista)	7
Scottish Albums (Official Charts)	11
Spanish Albums (Promusicae)	86
Swedish Albums (Sverigetopplistan)	15
Swiss Albums (Schweizer Hitparade)	58
UK Albums (Official Charts)	11
US Billboard 200	2
US Top Rock Albums (Billboard)	19

=== Year-end charts ===
Year-end chart performance for Make Believe
Chart (2005)	Position
US Billboard 200	71

== Certifications ==
Certifications for Make Believe
Region	Certification	Certified units/sales
Japan (RIAJ)	Gold	100,000^{^}
Canada (Music Canada)	Platinum	100,000^{^}
United States (RIAA)	Platinum	1,000,000^{^}
^{^} Shipments figures based on certification alone.
