= Space Twins =

American rock band

- Origin: Knoxville, Tennessee
- Genres: Alternative rock
- Years active: 1993–2005
- Label: Raga Drop Records
- Members: Brian Bell; Glenn Maloof; Timothy Maloof; Mike Elliot
- Past members: Susan Fox
- Website: spacetwins.com

Space Twins is an American rock band fronted by Weezer guitarist Brian Bell.

== History ==
=== Early years ===
Space Twins was founded in 1993 by Weezer guitarist Brian Bell and, his then girlfriend, Susan Fox. Initially, the band was a small project in which the two would dress up in Star Trek style outfits with pipe-cleaner antennae, playing silly songs at kids' birthday parties. The duo even had nicknames for one another: SpaceHelmet and Moonboot.

=== The addition of Tim (Timothy Maloof), Glenn and Mike ===
In 1996, the project became more serious, and Bell was joined by high school friends, Timothy and Glenn Maloof. Bell also brought Mike Elliot into the fold, and, thus, a new Space Twins line-up was solidified.

The quartet developed a unique sound that blends modern indie rock with progressive and psychedelic elements. In Weezer's down-time, the band released two limited-edition 7" singles: "Osaka Aquabus" (1997) and "TV, Music & Candy" (1998). Both of these sold out quickly and are no longer in print.

=== The End of Imagining ===
In May 2003, the Space Twins independently released their debut album, The End of Imagining, on their own label Raga Drop Records. The album was critically acclaimed, with Rolling Stone critic John D. Luerresen naming the album 7th best of 2003. The album, like the band's previous releases, is out of print and remains sought after by many Weezer fans.

The band performed at the 2003 SXSW festival in Austin, Texas.

=== Current status ===
In May 2005, a message appeared on the band's official website:

"Yesterday the Space Twins jammed. It was much fun. We were working on and jamming a bunch of songs of Glenn's. It was like we hadn't had a break. Anyways, as soon as Brian gets back from the European tour we will be getting together regularly. We have plans of recording and hopefully touring. Everyone is doing well—Glenn, Mike, Brian and myself."

Bell has since formed another side-project, The Relationship, and, when asked in the 2006 fan interview, at Weezer's official website, Bell stated that: "I’m not pursuing Space Twins presently only The Relationship."

In the same interview, Bell stated a possibility of putting out a "psychedelic children’s record" involving the Space Twins' recording of "Nico", "Flowerpot", "The Clown Song", and "Birds In The Street" plus writing some new ones with Timothy Maloof.

== Line-up ==
=== Current ===
- Brian Bell - vocals, guitar
- Glenn Maloof - guitar
- Timothy Maloof - bass, vocals, violin
- Mike Elliot - drums

=== Previous ===
- Susan Fox

== Discography ==
=== Albums ===
- The End of Imagining - 2003

=== Vinyl singles ===
- "No Show" - 1994
- "Osaka Aquabus" - 1997
- "TV, Music, and Candy" - 1998
