= The End of Imagining =

Studio album by Space Twins
- Released: November 4, 2003
- Genre: Alternative
- Label: Raga Drop Records

Space Twins chronology
TV, Music, and Candy (1998)	The End of Imagining (2003)

Professional ratings
Review scores
Source	Rating
Allmusic	4/5 stars

The End of Imagining is the debut LP by Space Twins, released on November 4, 2003 on the band's own label Raga Drop Records. Rolling Stone critic John D. Luerresen named the album the 7th best of 2003.

== Background ==
Initially formed in 1993 as a duo with his then-girlfriend, Weezer guitarist Brian Bell reconstituted Space Twins as a band consisting of himself as lead singer, guitarist and main songwriter; Tim and Glenn Maloof, brothers and high school friends of Bell's who had moved from Knoxville to Los Angeles in 1997, respectively on bass and guitar; and Mike Elliot, whom Bell had befriended before joining Weezer, on drums.

After releasing two 7" singles in 1997 and 1998, Bell devoted time to Space Twins and began working on their full-length debut due to Weezer's inactivity. Weezer's return from hiatus in 2000 led to non-stop activity for two years in which they released their third and fourth studio albums and had already recorded demos for a fifth, before finally taking a break in late 2002. During this period, Bell and Space Twins finished their album. One of the songs included is "Yellow Camaro", which was Bell's contribution to the unused demos for Weezer's fifth album and had even been performed live by the band on tour. After it became apparent that Weezer would not immediately record their fifth album, Bell took back the song for Space Twins. Weezer's version of the song, also with Bell on lead vocals, would eventually appear on the Japanese edition of the 2010 compilation Death to False Metal.

In 2009, Brian Bell stated that he "think[s] it’s a fine album and one that I’m proud of."

== Track listing ==
All songs written by Brian Bell except "There's Always Tomorrow," "Nico" and "Birds in the Street" by Timothy Maloof.

1. "Rust Colored Sun"
2. "Rings of Saturn"
3. "There's Always Tomorrow"
4. "Yellow Camaro"
5. "Nothing for Love"
6. "Running Out of Time"
7. "Trudy Truelove"
8. "Happy Days"
9. "Louder Than Lies"
10. "Can't You See?"
11. "Nico"
12. "Birds in the Street"

== Personnel ==
- Brian Bell – vocals, guitar
- Glenn Maloof – guitar
- Timothy Maloof – bass, vocals, violin
- Mike Elliot - drums, percussion

Additional musicians

- Jason Falkner - Wurlitzer, piano, Chamberlin, guitar
- Aaron Embry - piano, Hammond, glockenspiel
- Ryan "Shmedly" Maynes - piano, celeste
- John Daversa - trumpet
- Liam Phillpot Curan - bass clarinet
- Tanya Haden - cello
