= Pork and Beans (song) =

Single by Weezer

from the album Weezer (The Red Album)
- Released: April 22, 2008
- Recorded: February 2008
- Genre: Alternative rock; power pop
- Length: 3:09
- Label: Geffen
- Songwriter: Rivers Cuomo
- Producer: Jacknife Lee

Weezer singles chronology
"This Is Such a Pity" (2006)	"Pork and Beans" (2008)	"The Greatest Man That Ever Lived" (2008)

Music video
- "Pork and Beans" on YouTube

"Pork and Beans" is a song by the American alternative rock band Weezer, released on the group's 2008 self-titled album Weezer, also known as the Red Album. It was released to radio on April 22, 2008 and released in digital form on April 24. The track debuted at number 19 on Billboard's Modern Rock chart, and spent eleven weeks at number one. The song charted in many countries such as Canada, Ireland, the United Kingdom, and the United States.

A music video of the song, which incorporated many YouTube celebrities and memes with the band, premiered on YouTube and was one of the most popular videos in the weeks following its release. The video won a Grammy Award for Best Music Video at the 51st Annual Grammy Awards.

== Writing and inspiration ==
Rivers Cuomo, lead singer and guitarist for Weezer, wrote the song in reaction to a meeting with Geffen executives, who told the band members that they needed to record more commercial material. Cuomo remarked, "I came out of it pretty angry. But ironically, it inspired me to write another song." Jacknife Lee produced the track with the band in early 2008 in what was the third and final recording session for the album. The many references to popular culture in the song are said to be a "statement of defiance" according to Internet reviewer David Ritter, who later describes it to be an "anti-anthem anthem" that opens up a "broad space for critical exploration of what it means to be an aging band in the major label system".

== Composition ==
According to the director of the video for "Pork and Beans", the song is about "the idea of being yourself, of being happy with who you are". In the album notes, Cuomo compares this to Timbaland's music, "It actually sounds like a Timbaland kind of production; he has little baby crying type of sounds." A reference is also made to Timbaland in the second verse with the line "Timbaland knows the way to reach the top of the chart". The song similarly refers to items such as Rogaine and Oakley sunglasses.

== Reception ==
The song has been generally well received by critics. Many reviewers were pleased with what they saw as a return-to-form sound reminiscent of the Blue Album (1994) and Pinkerton (1996) albums. Pitchfork Media writer Marc Hogan gave the song a positive review and described the song as, "a catchy, self-referential rocker, with the buzzsaw guitars and big choruses of Weezer's glory days, and that familiar, self-assured lameness." Simon Vozick-Levinson of Entertainment Weekly also gave the song a positive review, saying "That chunka-chunka guitar hook is pure [Weezer] gold, so much so that I didn't focus on Rivers Cuomo's very clever lyrics at first." Stereogum was also impressed with the song, stating it was a "sweet, savory dose of self-referential, self-deprecating Weezer rock ... This stuff sounds very familiar in a good, good way." NME described the song as having "[Cuomo's] best chorus in ages". However, Internet reviewer David Ritter suggested that the song was either "voided by the wholesale capitulation involved in going home and writing said commercial material" or "a calculated attempt to boost record sales by wrapping faux-defiance in pretty paper," going on to compliment its "Scorcho-y acoustic guitar," he then said that this, along with the "keyboard twinkles" and "squeals and squeaks", has little effect on the song and that they barely register on top of the much more noticeable lead vocals and power chords.

=== Commercial performance ===
In terms of chart performance, "Pork and Beans" is one of Weezer's most successful singles in its 25-year career. Debuting at number 19, the song reached number one on the Billboard Hot Modern Rock Tracks charts in only its third week on the charts. It became the group's ninth top 10 hit on this chart and third number one overall and spent 11 weeks at number one, making it one of only 17 songs to ever sit at number one on that particular chart for 10 weeks or longer and one of three songs to have spent 11 weeks at number one. It also represented its fastest rising single ever, reaching number one after a mere 11 days after release. It debuted at number 39 on the Billboard Hot Mainstream Rock Tracks chart, where it is peaked at number 25 and debuted in the Billboard Hot 100 at number 84 with 17,000 downloads of the song on iTunes and peaked at number 64. "Pork and Beans" was voted number one on Toronto radio station 102.1 the Edge's list of Top 102 Songs of 2008. This song was number 30 on Rolling Stone's list of the 100 Best Songs of 2008.

== In popular culture ==
The song was featured in the 2009 film trailers for Yes Man and Whip It!, and was released as downloadable content for the Rock Band video game series. It is also a featured song in Dance Dance Revolution Hottest Party 3 and in the Spill.com podcast "The League of Extremely Ordinary Gentlemen".

== Music video ==
Diet Coke and Mentos eruptions in the music video

The music video for "Pork and Beans" was directed by Mathew Cullen of the video production company Motion Theory and was first released on YouTube by the band on May 23, 2008. The video features many internet phenomena. Many YouTube celebrities joined with the band to film in the video, including Mark Allen Hicks (the "Afro Ninja"), Gary Brolsma ("Numa Numa"), Tay Zonday ("Chocolate Rain"), Cara Cunningham ("Leave Britney alone"), Caitlin Upton ("Miss South Carolina"), Liam Kyle "Kelly" Sullivan ("Shoes"), Kicesie, Ryan Wieber, Michael Scott, Judson Laipply, and Fritz Grobe and Stephen Voltz performing Diet Coke and Mentos eruptions. In addition, the video references other YouTube personalities such as Kevin Federline and Lim Jeong-hyun. Other internet memes mimicked in the video include the Dramatic Chipmunk and Mini Moni, parodies of G.I. Joe public service announcements, catching Ray-Bans with one's face, "All Your Base Are Belong to Us", the Dancing Banana, "Will It Blend?", the Soulja Boy dance, "Daft Hands" and "Daft Bodies", the Sneezing Panda, Charlie the Unicorn, the Dancing Baby, DoctorLegua's dancing CGI Donald Duck and gorillas, and the hoax UFO sighting in Haiti. Dan Dzoan, former world record holder for solving a Rubik's Cube with one hand in 17.90 seconds, was present for the shooting but does not appear in the video, though there are Rubik's Cubes in the video, and Dan is present in another video posted by Weezer to YouTube. Neil Cicierega's Potter Puppet Pals were slated to be in the video but were left out due to problems with shipments of props. A mock-up of the Dumbledore puppet can be seen in the video nonetheless.

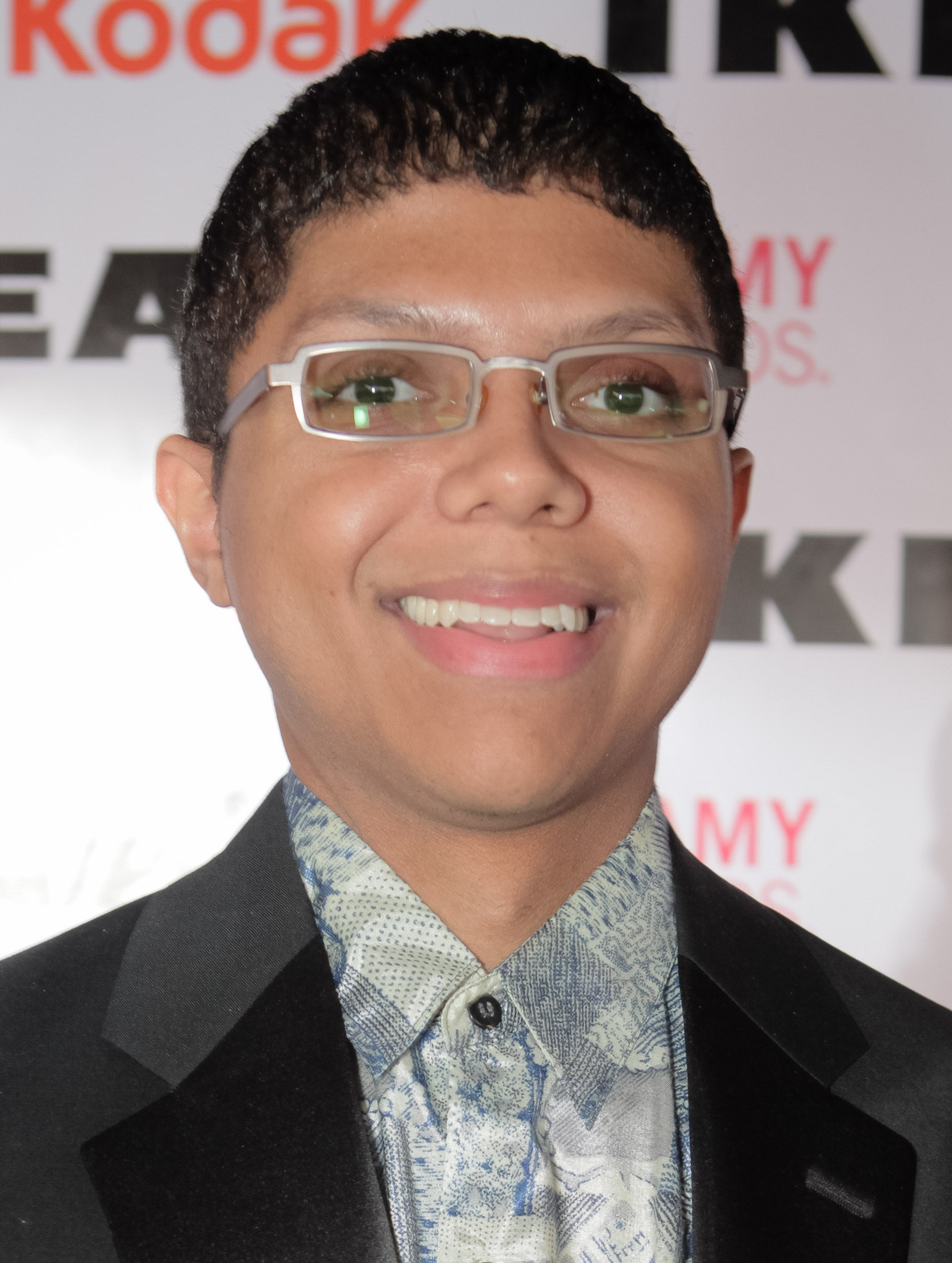
Tay Zonday was one of the multiple YouTube stars who appeared in the video.

The video shares some thematic similarities with the music video for the Barenaked Ladies single "Sound of Your Voice", which also featured multiple YouTube celebrities. According to Cullen, the video was to be a "celebration of that creativity", an idea that went over well with the members of the band. Cullen wanted to embrace the concept of "about being happy with who you are". Cullen hoped that the video would be "a living thing on the Internet"; as the video itself was a mash-up of Weezer's favorite stuff, Cullen hoped others will use the video to create their own mash-ups. The YouTube celebrities were flown into Los Angeles, California to work with the band for the four-day shooting of the video. The video, which quickly became popular, reached more than four million viewers in its first week and was that week's most-watched video. It was the most popular video of the month in June, reaching 7.3 million views by June 16, 2008. It was nominated for Best Editing for the 2008 MTV Video Music Awards and for Favorite Online Sensation at the 35th People's Choice Awards. The video won a Grammy for Best Short Form Music Video at the 51st Annual Grammy Awards.

On June 2, 2008, a video of an acoustic version of the song, with Brian Bell on guitar and Tay Zonday on vocals, was released on Weezer's official YouTube channel.

On January 12, 2009, a remix version of the "Pork and Beans" video was released to YouTube, which included additional footage not previously used in the original video. The new video, in addition to including footage of Dan Dzoan and Potter Puppet Pals, adds in more internet memes and celebrities, including "Badger Badger Badger", Little Superstar, Philippine prison inmates dancing to "Thriller", Leeroy Jenkins, Ronald Jenkees, BigDog, Ask a Ninja, Back Dorm Boys, Line Rider, "I Like Turtles", Techno Viking, and Pickle Surprise, and ends with the viewer being rickrolled.

== Track list ==
Radio only promo CD

1. "Pork and Beans" – 3:09

UK retail CD

1. "Pork and Beans" – 3:09
2. "Are 'Friends' Electric?" – 5:24 (Tubeway Army cover)

UK retail 7″ #1

1. "Pork and Beans" – 3:09
2. "Love My Way" (The Psychedelic Furs cover)

UK retail 7″ #2

1. "Pork and Beans" – 3:09
2. "Oddfellows Local 151" (R.E.M. cover)

== Personnel ==
Weezer

- Brian Bell – rhythm guitar, keyboards, backing vocals
- Rivers Cuomo – lead guitar, lead vocals
- Scott Shriner – bass guitar, backing vocals
- Patrick Wilson – drums, percussion, backing vocals

Additional personnel

- Jacknife Lee – production

== Charts ==
=== Weekly charts ===
Chart (2008)	Peak position
Australia (ARIA)	95
Belgium (Ultratip Bubbling Under Wallonia)	23
Canada Hot 100 (Billboard)	29
Canada Rock (Billboard)	4
European Hot 100	92
Irish Singles Chart	42
UK Singles (Official Charts)	33
US Billboard Hot 100	64
US Adult Pop Airplay (Billboard)	33
US Adult Alternative Airplay (Billboard)	25
US Alternative Airplay (Billboard)	1
US Mainstream Rock (Billboard)	25
US Pop 100	70
Venezuela Pop Rock (Record Report)	6

=== Year-end charts ===
Chart (2008)	Position
Canada Rock (Radio & Records)	18
US Alternative Songs (Billboard)	3

== Certifications ==
Region	Certification	Certified units/sales
United States (RIAA)	Platinum	1,000,000^{‡}
^{‡} Sales+streaming figures based on certification alone.
