= Weezer (Red Album) =

2008 studio album by Weezer

Studio album by Weezer
- Released: June 3, 2008
- Recorded: April 2007 – February 2008
- Studios: Shangri La Studios and Malibu Performing Arts Center, Malibu, California; Threshold Studios, Santa Monica, California
- Genres: Alternative rock; power pop
- Length: 41:23
- Labels: DGC; Interscope
- Producers: Rick Rubin; Jacknife Lee; Weezer

Weezer chronology
Make Believe (2005)	Weezer (2008)	Christmas with Weezer (2008)

Singles from Weezer
- 1. "Pork and Beans" Released: April 22, 2008; 2. "The Greatest Man That Ever Lived (Variations on a Shaker Hymn)" Released: May 13, 2008; 3. "Dreamin'" Released: May 27, 2008; 4. "Troublemaker" Released: July 26, 2008

Weezer (also known as the Red Album) is the sixth studio album by the American rock band Weezer, released on June 3, 2008, by DGC and Interscope Records. Rick Rubin and Jacknife Lee both produced parts of the album, with the band producing a handful of tracks themselves. It is the only Weezer album to feature lead vocals from all four band members. The album also features more musical experimentation in comparison to their previous efforts, especially shown in such songs as "Dreamin'", "The Angel and The One", and "The Greatest Man That Ever Lived".

Although the album proved to be less commercially successful than Make Believe (2005), the Red Album was better received by critics than the previous album. Two commercial singles were released from the album—"Pork and Beans" and "Troublemaker"—both becoming relatively successful modern rock hits. The video for the former also became the most-watched video on the internet the weekend following its release. Additionally, an unconventional Hootenanny Tour replaced the traditional rock concert tour to promote the album.

== Background ==
After the platinum success of their fifth album Make Believe (2005), the band once again was put on hiatus. Frontman Rivers Cuomo returned to Harvard University to complete his education; he graduated as a member of Phi Beta Kappa. Cuomo also married Kyoko Ito on June 18, 2006, a woman he had known since March 1997. He proposed to her in Tokyo shortly before Christmas 2005. The wedding was held at a secluded beach on Paradise Cove in Malibu and was attended by over a hundred people, including the current members of Weezer as well as former members Jason Cropper and Matt Sharp, as well as notables Justin Fisher, Kevin Ridel and Rick Rubin.

Meanwhile, members Patrick Wilson and Brian Bell appeared in the 2006 film Factory Girl playing John Cale and Lou Reed respectively and contributing a cover of the Velvet Underground song "Heroin" for the film. Also during this time, Bell formed a new side-band called The Relationship, while Wilson started work on material for the next album by his band The Special Goodness. He also had a second child, Ian Patrick Wilson, with his wife in early 2008.

The band announced in June 2007 that recording sessions for the album would begin in July. In December 2007, Cuomo released the compilation album Alone: The Home Recordings of Rivers Cuomo, which featured home demos that Cuomo recorded from 1992 to 2007. It was also during this time that a mysterious website called albumsix.com began gaining attention. The website gave false information about the album such as the album title would be Tout Ensemble (French for "All Together") and a fake release date. The website deceived several news outlets such as Pitchfork and Rolling Stone. The website was later revealed to be a hoax created by some fans. Band historian Karl Koch stated on Weezer's official website:

Please note that Weezer and Geffen Records have no affiliation with www.albumsix.com. The new Weezer record is not called Tout Ensemble and there is no official release date yet for the album. Remember, when it's on Weezer.com, it's for sure. (Though I will say, 'well played', to the authors of that site.)

== Recording ==
At the beginning of the album's creation each Weezer member asked themselves what they wanted to get out of the album. With that in mind, they set out to record. Recording was done in three sessions. Half of the album was recorded during the spring of 2007 with Rubin overseeing production. The second session, started in July and finished on October 18, was produced by Weezer themselves at Malibu. The third and final session of recording was done at the request of Geffen Records, who believed that there was not enough commercial material on the album. This session was produced by Jacknife Lee and completed in March 2008. In the first podcast released on www.riverspodcast.com, Cuomo mentioned playing drums on two songs on the album. In an interview with Pitchfork, Cuomo stated the album would contain "longer songs, non-traditional song forms, different people writing and singing, instrument switching, TR-808s, synths, Southern rap, and baroque counterpoint."

== Writing and composition ==
The majority of the album's content was written by Cuomo. However, for the first time since their debut album other members of the band contributed songwriting as well. Cuomo consciously strived to write less traditionally-structured songs, breaking away from the "verse-chorus--verse-chorus-bridge" structure that was present on past albums. Much of the album's subject matter is rooted in past experiences and nostalgia.

Weezer plays in the foreground while Fritz Grobe and Stephan Voltz set off Diet Coke and Mentos eruptions behind them in the "Pork and Beans" music video.

"Troublemaker", which was considered for the first single, introduces the theme of nostalgia for the album, with Cuomo "reliving his lost youth". "The Greatest Man That Ever Lived (Variations on a Shaker Hymn)" is a track that includes piano, police sirens, rapped vocals and Cuomo singing in falsetto. Bassist Scott Shriner was particularly proud of the song saying, "The song 'The Greatest Man That Ever Lived' is a masterpiece that includes ten different styles of music based around a common theme. It's awesome. That word gets abused a lot, like 'Wow, these pancakes are awesome,' but 'Greatest Man' is . . . awesome!" "Pork and Beans", the album's third track and first single, was written by Cuomo as a reaction to a meeting with Geffen where the band was told they needed to record more-commercial material.

"Heart Songs" is about all the artists and records that have influenced Cuomo from Gordon Lightfoot's "The Wreck of the Edmund Fitzgerald" when he was 5 years old to Nirvana's Nevermind (1991) in his early 20s. The song misidentifies the cover of "I Think We're Alone Now" as being by Debbie Gibson instead of Tiffany, an error that was brought to Cuomo's attention while recording. Cuomo opted to keep the error in due to his own memories and the personal nature of the song. Cuomo told Pitchfork that the song was partly inspired by the Mariah Carey song "We Belong Together". Cuomo's childhood friend Adam Orth commented on the autobiographical element of the lyrics for "Everybody Get Dangerous". "Dreamin'" was originally titled "Daydreamer" and was described in the liner notes to Alone: The Home Recordings of Rivers Cuomo as an "epic, 6-minute, symphonic type of art song." "This is the Way", featured on Alone, was written as a more straightforward counterpart, and was originally selected by the band to be recorded for the Weezer album, but Cuomo persuaded the other members to go with "Dreamin'" instead.

"Thought I Knew" is also the name of a song by Bell's band The Relationship, and is a reworking and re-recording of the track with Weezer sung as a lead vocal by Bell. The song was originally written in a minor key. However, Bell felt that historically the band's songs haven't worked in minor and that the song needed to feel more uplifting. So he changed the song from minor to major and sped up the tempo. "Cold Dark World" is a song that was written by Cuomo and Shriner and features Shriner on lead vocals. Shriner commented, "...I wrote this kind of creepy music, and Rivers wrote these kind of happy, positive lyrics, but when you put it together, it made a super-creepy song which I'm really proud of." "Automatic" was written by Wilson and features him on lead vocals, saying that the song "is interesting. It's a big rock tune but it's kinda got a vibe to it and the lyrics are just about me wanting to give as much love as I can to my family..."

"The Angel and the One" serves as the album's closer. Some members of the band have remarked that this is their favorite track, including Wilson. Cuomo stated that initially the song "started out as a really standard pop song called 'bad girl' and had a verse and a chorus and bridge and all that stuff. And I just wasn't satisfied with it. It was too normal. So one day I sat down with my acoustic guitar and I just played [this] song over and over, on basically looping it. My fingers hurt so much, I just kept playing it. And over the hour that I was playing it, the song slowly evolved and it smoothed over and the sections blurred into each other. And it turned into this spiritual reverie that is really just one long development without any distinction between sections."

The album's deluxe edition featured four bonus tracks. "Pig" leaked as a demo in early 2007, this song details the life of a pig including playing in the mud as a piglet, falling in love, getting married, raising children and eventually being slaughtered. The final track that appears on the deluxe edition, "King", is sung by Shriner. In the liner notes for the deluxe edition, Shriner says that the song was not being voted by the rest of the band but was one of his favorite tracks from the demos Cuomo played for the band. One day Shriner called up Cuomo and demanded the band add the song on the album, Cuomo responded by saying that if Shriner wanted the song so bad he should sing it, and so he did. The song apparently took the longest to record and perfect, taking three weeks.

== Artwork ==
The album's cover debuted on Spinner.com on April 21, 2008. It features the band members Bell, Wilson, Cuomo and Shriner standing left to right in various outfits in front of a red backdrop, and is in a manner similar to their debut and 2001 albums. The cover was photographed by Sean Murphy. Pitchfork writer Amy Phillips compared the cover to the Village People saying, "Meet the new Village People: The Bartender, the Professor, the Cowboy, and the Biker." The cover received mixed reactions from fans wondering if the cover was a hoax. The cover was reconfirmed by the band's publicist Jim Merlis, "Yes, that's absolutely the cover. It's what they chose. They looked at a bunch of mockups, and that's the one they decided to go with. It's not a joke."

From a Buzznet.com interview with Shriner:

"The cover for the Red Album was kind of ... a happy accident," Shriner said. "We had a whole 'nother set of photographs that we wanted to be the cover and nothing that we were looking at ever matched up to what we felt that album sounded like and represents for us. Our art director got that photo [the official album cover], which originally was a fun photo. 'OK, everybody, go as your alter ego, and we'll take a kooky picture,' [he said.] He [the art director] put the red background behind that, and that's what felt like the strongest image that matched how we feel the album sounds." Like the album cover, the album itself was very much a group effort. While many tend to assume that most Weezer material was scribed by Cuomo, Shriner insists that, "We all wrote music on the record. [Drummer] Pat [Wilson] and [guitarist] Brian [Bell] wrote songs, and we all sing lead vocals on songs and sing leads on different verses and choruses."

== Release and promotion ==
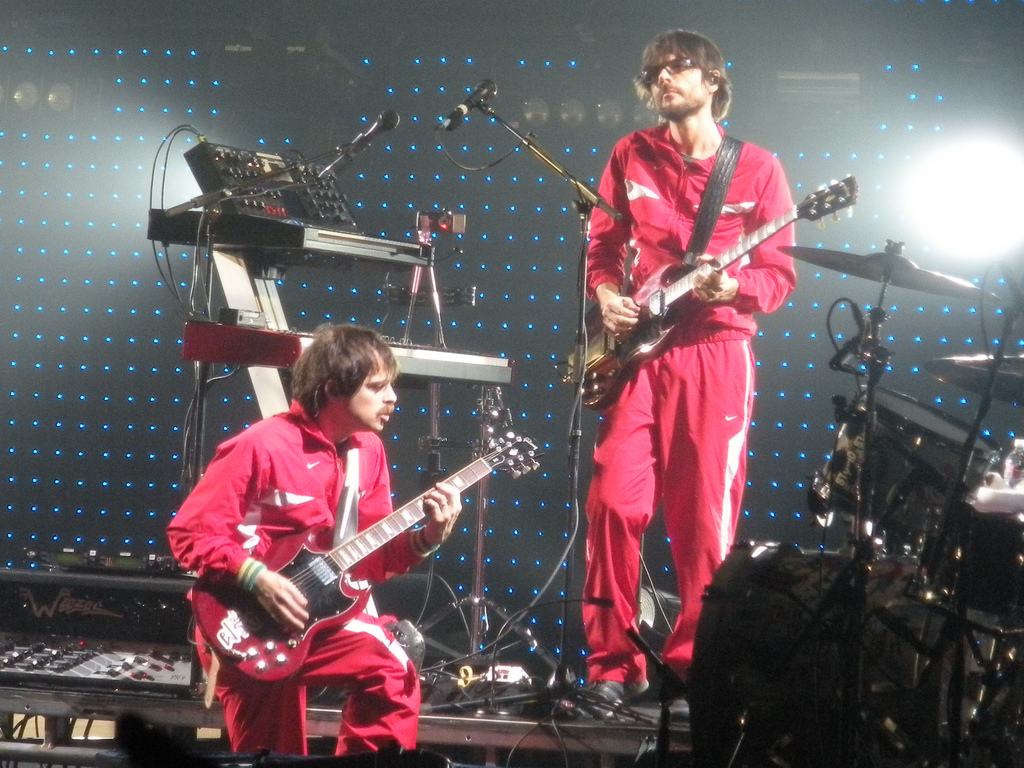
Weezer performing in 2008

On April 1, 2008, Rolling Stone reported that the album would once again be self-titled and become known as "The Red Album", with the first single being titled "Pork and Beans". The record was one of the first albums to be released on the new microSD slotMusic media format. In addition to the full album in a DRM-free MP3 format, the memory card also includes album art, liner notes, videos, and other features.

Several of the songs were featured in several media outlets. The album's fifth track, "Everybody Get Dangerous" was featured in the trailer for Disney's comedy film G-Force. It was also played briefly in the film 21, although it was later excluded from the official soundtrack release. "Automatic" was remixed by LA Riots for the 2007 video game Gran Turismo 5 Prologue.

The album was promoted with a tour throughout 2008 called the "Troublemaker Tour" with a bonus track off the album "King" also being played live. This would be the last time the band would tour to promote a new release of theirs until the release of Everything Will Be Alright in the End (2014).

== Critical reception ==
Professional ratings
Aggregate scores
Source	Rating
Metacritic	64/100
Review scores
Source	Rating
AllMusic	4.5/5 stars
The A.V. Club	D
Entertainment Weekly	B−
The Guardian	3/5 stars
Los Angeles Times	3.5/4 stars
NME	7/10
Pitchfork	4.7/10
Q	4/5 stars
Rolling Stone	3/5 stars
Spin	3.5/5 stars

According to the review aggregator Metacritic, Weezer (Red Album) received "generally favorable reviews" based on a weighted average score of 64 out of 100 from 32 critic scores. Stephen Thomas Erlewine of AllMusic gave the album a positive review of 4 1/2 stars out of five calling the album, "A cheerfully restless record, one where all the parts don't fit and it's better because of it, as it has a wild, willing personality, suggesting that Weezer is comfortable as a band in a way they never quite have been before." The Boston Globe called the songs, "consistently vibrant, catchy, and well-built." IGN also gave the album a score of 6.9 out of ten, stating, "The Red Album is totally bizarre, a certifiable mess, and a hell of a lot of fun." NME complimented Cuomo's songwriting saying, "Musically, it's a record that does much to further the claim for Cuomo's songwriting greatness." Los Angeles Times gave it a score of three-and-a-half stars out of four and called it "a rush, starting with a sustained, four-song soliloquy on pop music's allure."

Among the negative reviews, Tiny Mix Tapes called the album "a sad portrait of a band that has been totally destroyed by fame and the pressures that come along with it," and The A.V. Club saying: "If the so-called 'Red Album' really is an elaborate goof on an all-too-forgiving fan base, that doesn't make Weezer's newest worst album any less insipid." Pitchfork gave the record 4.7/10, lamenting that "like the YouTube culture the 'Pork and Beans' video depicts so well, the song-- and this album-- relies on a high quantity of short-lived pretty good ideas to distract from a shortage of great ones." Prefix Magazine said that if the Red Album's "songs were formulaic, shiny, and easily digestible like everything on Green or Maladroit, the vacuity of the new songs wouldn't be as big a problem. But 'Heart Songs,' 'Thought I Knew'--these are just plain bad."

=== Commercial performance ===
The Red Album debuted at the fourth spot of the Billboard 200, with 126,000 copies sold in its first week. As of August 2009, according to Nielsen SoundScan, the Red Album has sold 443,000 copies.

== Legacy ==
The Post ranked The Red Album the 6th best album by Weezer, and wrote that the album is among the band's most experimental. They also wrote: "The experiments pay off, and reflect Weezer's desire to constantly attempt new things as well as their refusal to fall back on their past success as a crutch."

In 2012, NME ranked The Red Album the 5th best album by the band.

== Track listing ==
All tracks are written by Rivers Cuomo, except where noted. All lead vocals by Cuomo, except where noted.

No.	Title	Writer(s)	Lead vocals	Length
1.	"Troublemaker"			2:44
2.	"The Greatest Man That Ever Lived (Variations on a Shaker Hymn)"		Cuomo; Bell; Shriner	5:52
3.	"Pork and Beans"			3:09
4.	"Heart Songs"			4:06
5.	"Everybody Get Dangerous"		Cuomo; Bell	4:03
6.	"Dreamin'"		Cuomo; Bell	5:12
7.	"Thought I Knew"	Brian Bell	Bell	3:01
8.	"Cold Dark World"	Cuomo; Scott Shriner	Shriner	3:51
9.	"Automatic"	Patrick Wilson	Wilson	3:07
10.	"The Angel and the One"			6:46
Total length:				41:23

Deluxe edition
No.	Title	Writer(s)	Lead vocals	Length
11.	"Miss Sweeney"	Cuomo; Sarah C. Kim		4:02
12.	"Pig"			4:02
13.	"The Spider"			4:43
14.	"King"		Shriner; Cuomo	5:11
Total length:				59:21

iTunes bonus track
No.	Title	Writer(s)	Lead vocals	Length
15.	"It's Easy"	Bell	Bell	3:10
Total length:				62:31

iTunes pre-order bonus track
No.	Title	Length
16.	"I Can Love"	3:49
Total length:		66:20

International bonus track
No.	Title	Writer(s)	Lead vocals	Length
11.	"The Weight" (The Band cover)	Robbie Robertson	Cuomo; Shriner	4:31
Total length:				45:54

UK and Japanese bonus track
No.	Title	Writer(s)	Lead vocals	Length
12.	"Life Is What You Make It" (Talk Talk cover)	Mark Hollis; Tim Friese-Greene	Wilson	3:32
Total length:				49:26

Japanese bonus track
No.	Title	Writer(s)	Length
13.	"Meri Kuri" (BoA cover)	Kan Tinhua; Kazuhiro Hara	5:24
Total length:			54:50

Japan Deluxe Edition DVD
No.	Title	Writer(s)	Length
1.	"Intro"
2.	"Dope Nose"
3.	"Why Bother?"
4.	"Surf Wax America"	Cuomo; Wilson
5.	"The Good Life"
6.	"Island In The Sun"
7.	"Undone – The Sweater Song"
8.	"Behind the scenes From Japan Tour"
9.	"'Pork and Beans' MV"
10.	"Interview"
11.	"Song-by-song commentary"
Total length:			64:00

Notes

- "It's Easy" and "I Can Love" are previously unreleased acoustic demos recorded in 2003.

== Personnel ==
Weezer

- Rivers Cuomo – vocals, guitar (tracks 1–6, 8, 10–14), drums (tracks 7, 9)
- Pat Wilson – drums (tracks 1–6, 8, 10–14), keyboards, percussion, guitar (tracks 7, 9), lead vocals (track 9)
- Brian Bell – guitar, vocals, keyboards, synthesizer
- Scott Shriner – bass, vocals, keyboards, synthesizer

Additional musicians

- Stevie Blacke – strings and string arrangements (track 4)
- Eric J – sound design & percussion (track 5)
- Geralyn Fennelly – organ (track 10)

Production

- Weezer – producer (tracks 2, 4–10)
- Rick Rubin – producer (tracks 2, 4–6 & 10)
- Jacknife Lee – producer (tracks 1 & 3)
- Rich Costey – mixer
- Justin Gerrish – mix engineer
- Andrew Scheps – recording
- Dana Nielsen – recording
- Eric J – Brian's overdub engineer (track 5)
- Phillip Broussard Jr. – assistant engineer
- Ken Sluiter – assistant engineer
- Lindsay Chase – album production coordinator
- Dave Collins – mastering
- Robert Fisher – art direction
- Sean Murphy – photography
- Karl Koch – photography

== Charts ==
Chart performance
Chart (2008)	Peak position
Australian Albums (ARIA)	21
Austrian Albums (Ö3 Austria)	39
Belgian Albums (Ultratop Wallonia)	80
Canadian Albums (Billboard)	2
Dutch Alternative Albums (Alternative Top 30)	22
French Albums (SNEP)	81
German Albums (Offizielle Top 100)	60
Irish Albums (IRMA)	27
Japanese Albums (Oricon)	9
Japanese International Albums (Oricon)	1
New Zealand Albums (RMNZ)	15
Norwegian Albums (VG-lista)	21
Scottish Albums (Official Charts)	21
UK Albums (Official Charts)	21
US Billboard 200	4
US Indie Store Album Sales (Billboard)	2
US Top Alternative Albums (Billboard)	2
US Top Rock Albums (Billboard)	2

== Release history ==
Release history
Region	Date
Canada	June 3, 2008
United States	June 3, 2008
Japan	June 4, 2008
Germany	June 6, 2008
Australia	June 7, 2008
Worldwide	June 9, 2008
United Kingdom	June 16, 2008
