= Charlie the Unicorn =

- First video thumbnail of Charlie the Unicorn
- Directed by: Jason Steele
- Written by: Jason Steele
- Produced by: Jason Steele
- Starring: Jason Steele
- Edited by: Jason Steele
- Music by: Jason Steele
- Production company: FilmCow
- Distributed by: FilmCow
- Release date: November 26, 2005 (Newgrounds)
- Running time: 4 minutes
- Country: United States
- Language: English

Charlie the Unicorn is a 2005 animated comedy short film created by Jason Steele. Independently produced by FilmCow, the short follows Charlie, a lethargic and pessimistic unicorn, who is taken by a blue unicorn and a pink unicorn on an adventure to the magical Candy Mountain. However, the journey turns out to be a farce, and Charlie has one of his kidneys stolen by the other two unicorns.

Steele created the video as a birthday present for their mother; the video was partially credited to her and was uploaded by Steele on Newgrounds under the username TypeQueen, where it rapidly increased in popularity. The video was later uploaded onto YouTube by Geoff Swanson, where it gained large viewership and continued to increase in popularity. A merchandising line was later produced, as well as four sequels and a parody series titled Charlie teh Unicron. The first three episodes in the series were released to DVD in 2009 as part of The FilmCow Master Collection.

== Plot ==
In a quiet meadow, Charlie, a unicorn, is resting, before he is awakened by a blue and a pink unicorn. The two inform him that they have found a map to the magical Candy Mountain, and that he must come with them on their journey. Charlie initially refuses and goes back to sleep. The blue unicorn begins to jump on Charlie, insistent that he should come, and both begin to pester him with details of the mountain, causing him to begrudgingly give in to their demands.

The trio begin their journey in a forest, where the blue and pink unicorns lead Charlie to a Magical Liopleurodon, who supposedly tells them the way with unintelligible gurgles. The trio then cross a bridge, while the blue unicorn badgers Charlie (who is concerned about his hooves being covered in splinters) by repeating his name and reminding him they are on a magical bridge. When the trio arrives at Candy Mountain, the letters of the "candy" sign come to life and the "Y" sings a song (sung to the tune of the Clarinet Polka) imploring Charlie to go into the Candy Cave. After the letters explode, Charlie reluctantly goes into the cave, and the blue and pink unicorns say goodbye as Charlie is trapped inside and knocked out by an unknown assailant. When Charlie awakens in the meadow, he realizes to his dismay that they have taken one of his kidneys.

== Characters ==
- Jason Steele plays Charlie the Unicorn, a grouchy, lethargic unicorn who is badgered by his two unicorn companions to travel with them to Candy Mountain. He acts cynical throughout the trip and fails to believe that such a place could be real, but to his surprise, Candy Mountain turns out to actually exist.
- Steele also plays the blue and pink unicorns who annoy Charlie and convince him to travel with them to Candy Mountain. Steele has revealed very little about the two in the Charlie the Unicorn videos for humorous value, most notably their genders and their names. He believed that his characters were "somewhat scary" and "more interesting" when little is revealed about them. In March 2016, he revealed via an upload of the original script on his website that the blue and pink unicorns were given the placeholder names Lolz and Roffle in the original script. The unicorns are not named within the series itself.
- In his first musical role in the Charlie the Unicorn series, Steele performs the singing voice of the Letter "Y", an anthropomorphic letter who resides alongside letters "C", "A", "N", and "D" on the Candy Mountain marquee sign. He perform the musical number "The Candy Mountain Cave".
- The Magical Liopleurodon is a character briefly featured in the video. The character communicates in his species' natural call, and supposedly guides the unicorns to Candy Mountain. According to Steele, Charlie the Unicorn was the first time many viewers heard about the genus Liopleurodon, and following the video's rise in popularity, many would incorrectly pronounce the species' name as /ˌleɪəˈplʊərədɒn/ as it is pronounced in the video, rather than the correct pronunciation, /ˌlaɪoʊˈplʊərədɒn/.

== Production ==
Independent animator Jason Steele, a graduate of Full Sail University, conceived Charlie the Unicorn in 2005 as a gift for their mother's birthday, as she enjoyed unicorn-related conversation. Steele had lost their job and most of their possessions in the wake of Hurricane Katrina hitting New Orleans. When they moved to Orlando, Steele claims they were "completely out of money, but still wanted to get [their mother] something" for her upcoming birthday. According to Steele: "Knowing this, she said that instead of a gift I could make a cartoon for her about unicorns. So I made 'Charlie the Unicorn'. More than ten years later she still brings up the fact that her birthday present launched my career."

Steele imagined the first aspects of the video's plotline when they were running around their house chanting "La la la!" repeatedly, then quickly envisioned the rest of the plotline shortly thereafter. According to Steele, the video's conception happened "all at once; there was no editing." The video is primarily structured around surrealist humor and dark humor. Steele claims that the dark humor was inspired by musician Logan Whitehurst, of whom Steele was a fan and who composed the theme song for Steele's 2003 computer-animated short film Secret Agent Bob. Steele also describes the surreal humor as "contrast[ing] to how bright and cheerful" the video's atmosphere is. The series is targeted towards young adults.

Steele drew designs for Charlie the Unicorn using Adobe Photoshop, animated the video in Adobe Flash, and edited it in Final Cut Pro. The audio was recorded using Amadeus II and the music was recorded with GarageBand. The video also contains a musical number titled "The Candy Mountain Cave", featured during the sequence where Charlie refuses to enter the Candy Mountain Candy Cave, sung by the mountain's marquee letter "Y". Although the blue and pink unicorns were intended to sing the song, Steele found it difficult to sing in their voices at a rapid pace, and resorted to using the Letter "Y" instead.

== Reception ==
"Charlie the Unicorn proves that something doesn't have to make any sense at all to earn a cultlike following. The animated adventure centers on a group of unicorns venturing to Candy Mountain — 'the land of sweets and joy, and joyness' — through the guide of a Liopleurodon. Created by animator Jason Steele, the pilot episode gained 46 million views, sparking a series of follow-up adventures."

— Dan Fletcher, Time magazine

Charlie the Unicorn has become increasingly popular since its inception. Following its posting on Newgrounds in 2005, Geoff Swanson of YouTube posted a copy of the video on the website in 2006, where it rapidly gained popularity. It reached a total of approximately 8 million views Internetwide in 2007. The video had climbed to 46 million views by March 2010. It currently has 68 million views on Geoff Swanson's YouTube upload, and 37 million views on FilmCow's official YouTube upload.

Online magazine Salon described the video as "The unlikely adventure of a crotchety unicorn" and stated "We often feel like Charlie the Unicorn. Annoying, brightly colored colleagues poke at us with their curly horns as we snooze at our desk, promising far-off, sugar-coated delights. Do we muster the energy to follow them, hoping some sweet payoff will break the unbearable bleakness of our daily existence? Can they be trusted?" The series has also attracted a number of celebrities, including British television personality Alex Zane, and American entertainers Kevin Pereira and Olivia Munn. Brian Hamlin of The Hollywood Reporter considered the video to be "incredibly dumb and annoying" yet "really funny and weird too full of unicorn joyness and music." In 2010, Dan Fletcher of Time magazine named Charlie the Unicorn number 49 in their list of "YouTube's 50 Best Videos", stating "Charlie the Unicorn proves that something doesn't have to make any sense at all to earn a cultlike following."

== Sequels, spinoffs, and parodies ==
Four sequels have been released: Charlie the Unicorn 2 (2008), Charlie the Unicorn 3 (2009), Charlie the Unicorn 4 (2012), and Charlie the Unicorn: The Grand Finale (2021). The first three continue the theme of Charlie going on adventures with the blue and pink unicorns and getting hoodwinked in the end. On February 23, 2016, FilmCow released a video titled "Charlie the Unicorn: The Grand Finale Kickstarter" in which it was announced that there was a thirty-minute finale planned for December 2016; the Kickstarter raised $209,247 in funds. Steele released the first part of The Grand Finale on YouTube on October 10, 2019, expecting to follow it up with four more parts. The second part was released on June 15, 2020. In a YouTube comment under the third installment, which premiered on September 7, 2021, Steele stated that The Grand Finale would have five parts. The Grand Finale was released in its entirety on October 23, 2021. An epilogue titled Charlie the Unicorn Enjoys a Moment of Peace was released on December 24, 2024.

On November 22, 2008, as a feature of the YouTube Live streamed event, the cast of Charlie the Unicorn were featured in a short film directed by creator Jason Steele featuring YouTube Live colliding with real life, causing several various memes to come to life, namely Rick Astley making a comeback and the world's weather conditions being altered in favor of raining chocolate. The short sequence was promoted with a forty-three-second video depicting Charlie and the two unicorns attempting to defuse a bomb before being attacked by a large group of seagulls; the short had no connection whatsoever to the video it was promoting other than advertising purposes. The video "Charlie the Unicorn at Playlist Live" was released on March 28, 2013 to promote the Playlist Live conference; the video involved the three unicorns meeting YouTube celebrities at Playlist Live.

On March 1, 2009, creator Jason Steele released a video to accompany Hot Topic's Charlie the Unicorn merchandising line titled Charlie the Unicorn and the Tomb of Horrors. The video follows Charlie and the two unicorns scaling an ancient chamber inhabited by "The Weasel", a shamanist weasel who has attempted to call upon forces of evil that laid waste to the world ten thousand years prior.

Steele also produced a four-short parody series titled Charlie teh Unicron. Steele says it is based around "what the Charlie the Unicorn series would be like if it was written by random internet people." Another parody, Charlie the Yannicorn, was made in 2013. That same year, during the Detective Heart of America: The Final Freedom Kickstarter, another parody, Charlie the Unitective Heart of America, was released, featuring Heart of America as Charlie. Although not released on FilmCow's main channel, it can be found on a playlist.

Multiple livestreams featuring Charlie communicating with viewers were conducted on the FilmCow YouTube channel, as part of a promotion for the series' Grand Finale Kickstarter in 2016. However, only "Charlie the Unicorn's LIVE Oscars Spectacular!" — a stream which ran at the same time as the 88th Academy Awards — has been made publicly available (though unlisted) since the original streams were conducted.

== Merchandise ==
Merchandising lines produced by a partnership consisting of FilmCow and retailer CafePress as well as Hot Topic have been launched in response to the video's popularity. The merchandise features various quotes from the video's characters, and is sold in several forms including t-shirts, pins, coffee mugs, and bandannas.

A game titled Charlie the Unicorn Dating Simulator and a storybook titled Charlie the Unicorn: Lost in Dreamspace were released by Steele in 2016. According to Steele, the storybook is "an illustrated side-adventure that takes place a little while after the end of Charlie the Unicorn 2."

== In other media ==
The cast of Charlie the Unicorn also appeared on May 23, 2008, in the music video for Weezer's single "Pork and Beans". The music video was directed by Mathew Cullen of the video production company Motion Theory and features many Internet phenomena, including Charlie and the blue and pink unicorns. The character of Charlie first appears in a sequence parodying the G.I. Joe public service announcements starring animated versions of the band as children, where the character Gung-Ho of the G.I. Joe franchise appears as their mentor and has a tattoo of Charlie on his chest. All three unicorns appear at the end alongside the band and various other Internet memes.
