= The Relationship =

American band (2007–2019)

- Genres: Rock, alternative rock
- Years active: 2007–2019
- Label: Golden State
- Past members: Brian Bell; Brandon Graham; Jon LaRue; Justin Goings; Nate Shaw; Anthony Burulcich; Eric J. Dubowsky
- Website: Official website

The Relationship was an American rock band from Los Angeles, California, United States, founded in 2007 by Weezer guitarist Brian Bell and Nate Shaw. In 2010, Bell released the first Relationship album and has since performed and recorded with a revolving cast of players and collaborators.

The band's 2015 single, "Oh Allen" (Burger Records), garnered praise from Billboard, Entertainment Weekly, Alternative Press, and Rolling Stone. That year, the band also landed coveted spots at Burgerama 4 and the Sundance Film Festival.

In 2019, Bell stated that he had stopped pursuing The Relationship in the past year and that any of his future musical endeavors outside of Weezer would be entirely new, including the name.

The band's most recent line-up was Brian Bell (guitar and vocals), Jon LaRue (bass), Justin Goings (drums) and Brandon Graham (lead guitar).

== First album ==
Recording of The Relationship's first album took place at Bell's private home studio in the city of Los Angeles on an analog 8 track. Sean Lennon mentioned in a 2006 interview that he will appear with Bell on The Relationship's debut record. Weezer frontman Rivers Cuomo and Bell co-wrote a song together for the project titled "Hand to Hold," however, Bell has stated he that does not think it will be on their debut album.

Bell has posted twenty songs to date on the band's Myspace page: "You Rock My Heart," "Please Help Me," "Something More," "Together Tomorrow," "Thought I Knew," "Happiness," "Amy Magazine," "3rd Gnossiennes," "In Love with Love," "Are You Gonna Be?," "Hand to Hold," "Will I Ever See Her Again?," "Mother Night," "Ugly Things," "Mow the Lawn," "Young Temptations," "Mistake Maker," "Sweet on You," "Oh Allen," and "Clown Song."

Two versions of "Are You Gonna Be?, "Hand To Hold", "Mother Night, "Please Help Me, "Something More, "Thought I Knew", "Together Tomorrow," and "Will I Ever See Her Again?" were posted.

"Hand to Hold" is a reworked version of the Weezer song "Private Message," co-written by Rivers Cuomo. Bell asked Cuomo if he could take a stab at the song since Weezer never officially released it.

The band debuted some new songs at their first show on December 15 at Kilby Court in Salt Lake City, Utah.

In a December 18, 2007 weezer.com update the following was posted: "According to Brian, his other band The Relationship is back on track with some fresh faces in the mix and new recordings are in the pipeline."

"Thought I Knew" was re-worked and rerecorded by Weezer for their 2008 self-titled album, although Brian claims the Relationship version will be included on the Relationship album. The Relationship opened for Weezer on three California shows on their 2008 Troublemaker Tour, with Bell pulling double duty with both bands.

The mixing of The Relationship's debut album was finished on October 29, 2008. On November 17, 2010, the cover art for The Relationship's self-titled debut was revealed via the band's Facebook page. It was released digitally on Amazon and iTunes on November 30, 2010. Brian Bell also signed and notarized physical copies for fans at Weezer's Memories Tour shows.

In 2017, the band released a video for "Break Me Open", from their album "Clara Obscura". The video was directed by Steven Johnson.

== Second album ==
The Relationship's second album, Clara Obscura, was released on April 18, 2017.

== Discography ==
Studio albums

- The Relationship (2010)
- Clara Obscura (2017)

Singles

- "Oh Allen" / "Young Temptations" (2015)
- "Break Me Open" (2017)
