= Brian Bell =

American rock guitarist (born 1968)

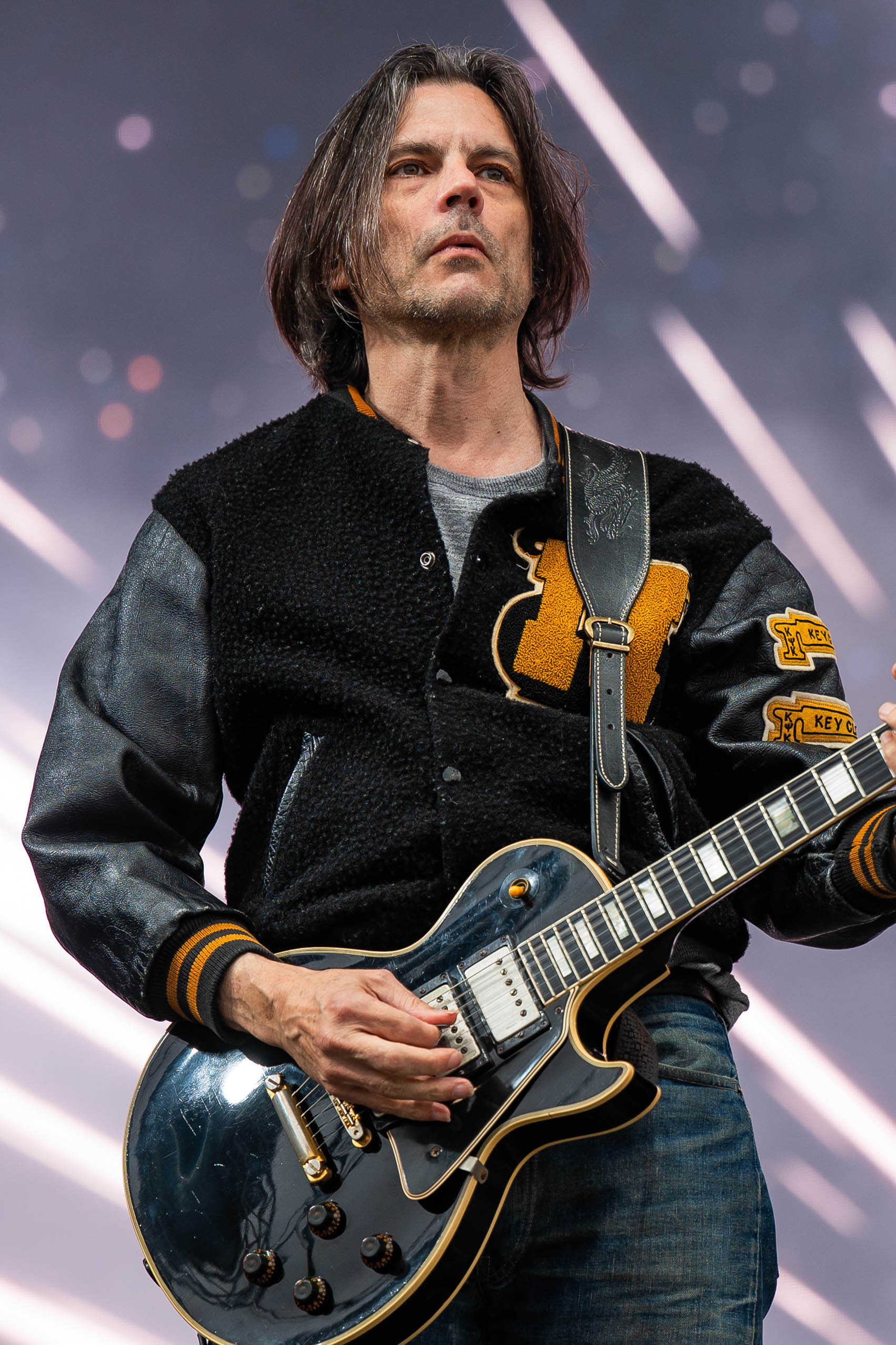
- Bell performing with Weezer in 2025

Background information
- Born: Brian Lane Bell; December 9, 1968 (age 57); Iowa City, Iowa, U.S.
- Origin: Knoxville, Tennessee, U.S.
- Genres: Alternative rock; power pop; pop rock; pop-punk; geek rock; emo
- Occupations: Musician; singer; songwriter
- Instruments: Guitar; vocals; keyboards; bass
- Years active: 1982–present
- Label: Geffen
- Member of: Weezer
- Formerly of: The Relationship; Space Twins; Carnival Art

Brian Lane Bell (born December 9, 1968) is an American musician, singer, and songwriter. He has been the rhythm guitarist and backing vocalist of the rock band Weezer since 1993, with whom he has recorded twenty studio albums. Bell also fronted the rock band The Relationship and was the lead vocalist and guitarist of the indie rock band Space Twins.

Moving to Los Angeles at the age of eighteen, Bell played bass guitar in the band Carnival Art, releasing three studio albums with the band before departing in 1993. Bell subsequently joined Weezer as its rhythm guitarist and backing vocalist, at the request of band member Matt Sharp. Replacing founding member Jason Cropper, Bell joined the band during the recording of its debut album, Weezer (1994). Backed by the singles "Buddy Holly", "Undone – The Sweater Song" and "Say It Ain't So", the album was a critical and commercial success.

== Early life ==
Bell was born in Iowa City, Iowa to parents Tom Bell, a geography professor at University of Tennessee, and Linda Menasco, an elementary school assistant principal, and raised in Knoxville, Tennessee. He first took an interest in music at age four, when his parents took him to an Elvis Presley concert at the Stokely Athletic Centre in Knoxville. Soon after, Bell became obsessed with his father's record collection, and played it constantly. Bell was forced by his mother to take piano lessons, and refused to let him take guitar lessons until high school, because she "wouldn't believe that he would practice." Eventually, during his freshman year in high school, Bell's parents allowed him to take guitar lessons from Knoxville musician Ben Bolt.

During his first year in high school, Bell had to switch schools; "I was zoned to go to county school and my mom taught in the city, which meant I could go to a more privileged school. In doing that, I was surrounded by snobs'. 'I was kind of finding myself at the time, so I decided to go to the school I was zoned for." During this time, Bell had a job delivering pizzas in the Knoxville area at Stefano's Pizza. He worked with Jason Bales and Blair and Todd Mitchell (who he introduced to Queensryche's music). He worked and started playing in a band with school friends, Tim and Glenn Maloof, named Blooshroom, which Bell described as "Pink Floyd-meets-The Stooges."

After completing high school at Bearden High School in 1987, Bell decided against college, feeling it would be a "waste of money." At the age of 18, Bell moved to Los Angeles, California, and enrolled at G.I.T.

== Career ==
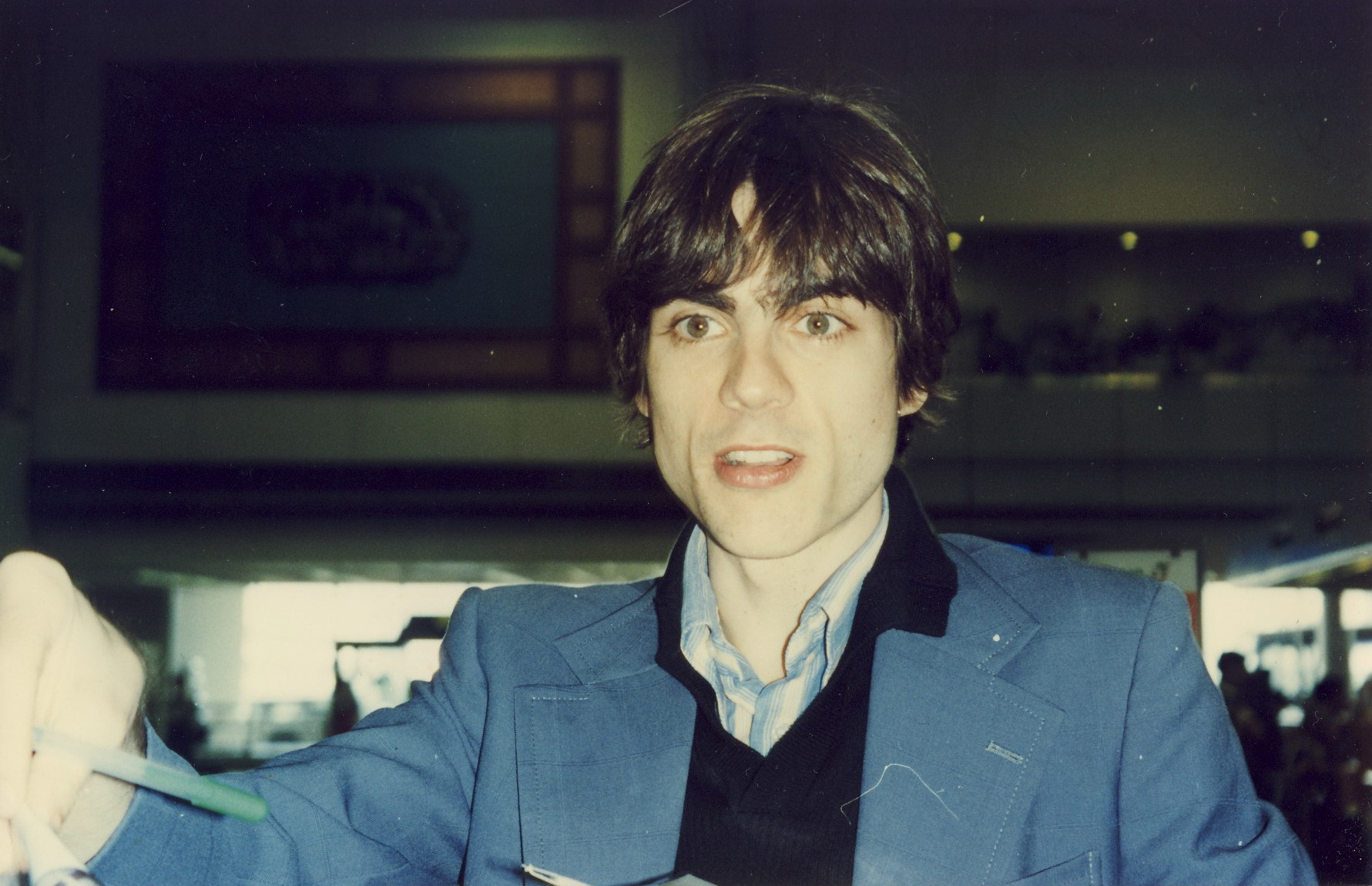
Bell at Don Mueang International Airport in Bangkok, Thailand in 1997

In 1991, Bell became a member of a band named Carnival Art, which released 3 official albums and an EP, with Bell playing bass guitar. The band had low record sales, and were dropped by their record label, Beggars Banquet.

As Carnival Art was disintegrating, Bell became acquainted with the members of Weezer. He said: "They started playing on the scene, and I instantly saw something unique in them. I didn't necessarily want to be in their band. They were for some reason, in with the wrong crowd and playing at the wrong venues. I wanted to help them out any way I could and I wanted to play a show with them." In mid-1993, Bell quit Carnival Art. At home, he found on his answering machine a message from Weezer bassist Matt Sharp. Sharp called again the next day, and Rivers Cuomo took the phone and asked him to join the band.

Despite being credited for guitar and vocals in the liner notes, Bell's last-minute arrival at the Blue Album sessions meant that he only had time to re-record Jason Cropper's backing vocals, while Cuomo re-did all of Cropper's guitar parts. Besides doing back-up vocals and playing rhythm guitar, during Weezer's live performances, Bell takes on many of the multi-instrumental duties, including keyboards or harmonica.

Although all songwriting credits on Weezer's 2005 album Make Believe are credited to Rivers Cuomo, Bell wrote the intro to "We Are All on Drugs" and the dueling guitars in the solo of "This is Such a Pity." Bell also contributed the song "Thought I Knew" to the band's 2008 self-titled album as well as "It's Easy," an iTunes exclusive demo that serves as a bonus track to that album. This marks the first time Weezer has officially released a song written and sung by Bell, although the band demoed and played his song "Yellow Camaro" live in 2002. The song eventually made it onto the Space Twins debut LP The End of Imagining.

In 2005, during live appearances, Bell provided lead vocals on the tracks "Why Bother?", "Smile", "Getchoo" and "Keep Fishin'". In 2008, during the band's Hootenanny Tour he began taking lead vocals on "El Scorcho". He continued singing "El Scorcho" and sang "Suzanne" as well on the band's Troublemaker Tour in 2008.

== Space Twins project ==
Throughout the years, Bell fronted his own band, Space Twins, who have had various incarnations since 1993. They have released three EPs and an LP, The End of Imagining, in 2003. Yet in 2006, Bell stated that he was "not presently pursuing" projects with The Space Twins.

== The Relationship project ==
In 2007 Bell recorded for a side project called The Relationship. The recording took place at Henson Recording Studios and Padre Terrace in Los Angeles and is produced by Weezer engineer Eric J. Sean Lennon mentioned in an interview that he will appear with Bell on The Relationship's debut record. Rivers Cuomo and Bell co-wrote a song together for the project titled "Hand to Hold," but Bell does not think it will be on their debut album. In May 2007 he uploaded "Hand to Hold" on the band's Myspace page. It is a reworking of the Weezer song "Private Message," which was originally in the running for inclusion on Make Believe. In March 2017, Bell announced that the band's newest album, Clara Obscura (meaning "Clear" and "Obscure"), would be released on April 18.

== Other ventures ==
Bell and Weezer drummer Patrick Wilson collaborated on a cover of the Velvet Underground song "Heroin", for the 2006 film Factory Girl.

In November 2006, Lyon Guitars (by Washburn) introduced a limited edition guitar series called "Limited Edition 2006," each of which had been hand-signed by Bell, and were in the same "strat" body style that he prefers to play.

Bell has also expressed an interest in the works of William Shakespeare. During the band's downtime in 2003 and 2004, Bell and his ex-girlfriend Peggy Nunez studied Shakespeare and poetry theory at the collegiate level. They also appeared in a production of Twelfth Night, in which Bell wrote four songs, all using Shakespeare's words.

Bell has appeared in one-off performances on guitar with other bands. Playing on March 17, 2006, at The Troubador in LA with Weezer tour-mates Ringside, and performing "Our Lips Are Sealed", with the Go-Go's member, Jane Wiedlin, on June 1, 2006, at the Viper Room. He sat in on guitars and back up vocals for Ringside's winter '06 tour in Russia.

It was announced that Bell will make his producing debut on the Ultra Sonic Edukators next album.

== Equipment ==
As of 2014, Bell solely uses Gibson Guitars, his current main instrument being a 2001 Gibson Explorer in limited edition diamond sparkle finish, which he found in Rivers Cuomo's basement, with a chrome mirror pickguard. His main amplifier is a Matchless Independence, a three channel, hand-wired tube amplifier, providing the thick distortion that Weezer is known for.

== Acting appearances ==
In 2006, Bell made his on-screen debut, playing Lou Reed in the Edie Sedgwick biographical film, Factory Girl. Bandmate Patrick Wilson also appeared as John Cale, another member of the Velvet Underground.

Bell voiced a band member on a 'booze-cruise" and was animated as himself in the Simpsons episode "The Hateful Eight-Year-Olds", along with the rest of Weezer.

Bell, alongside the rest of Weezer, appeared in the 2023 film Family Switch.

== Personal life ==
In 2006, Bell was a vegan.

== Discography ==
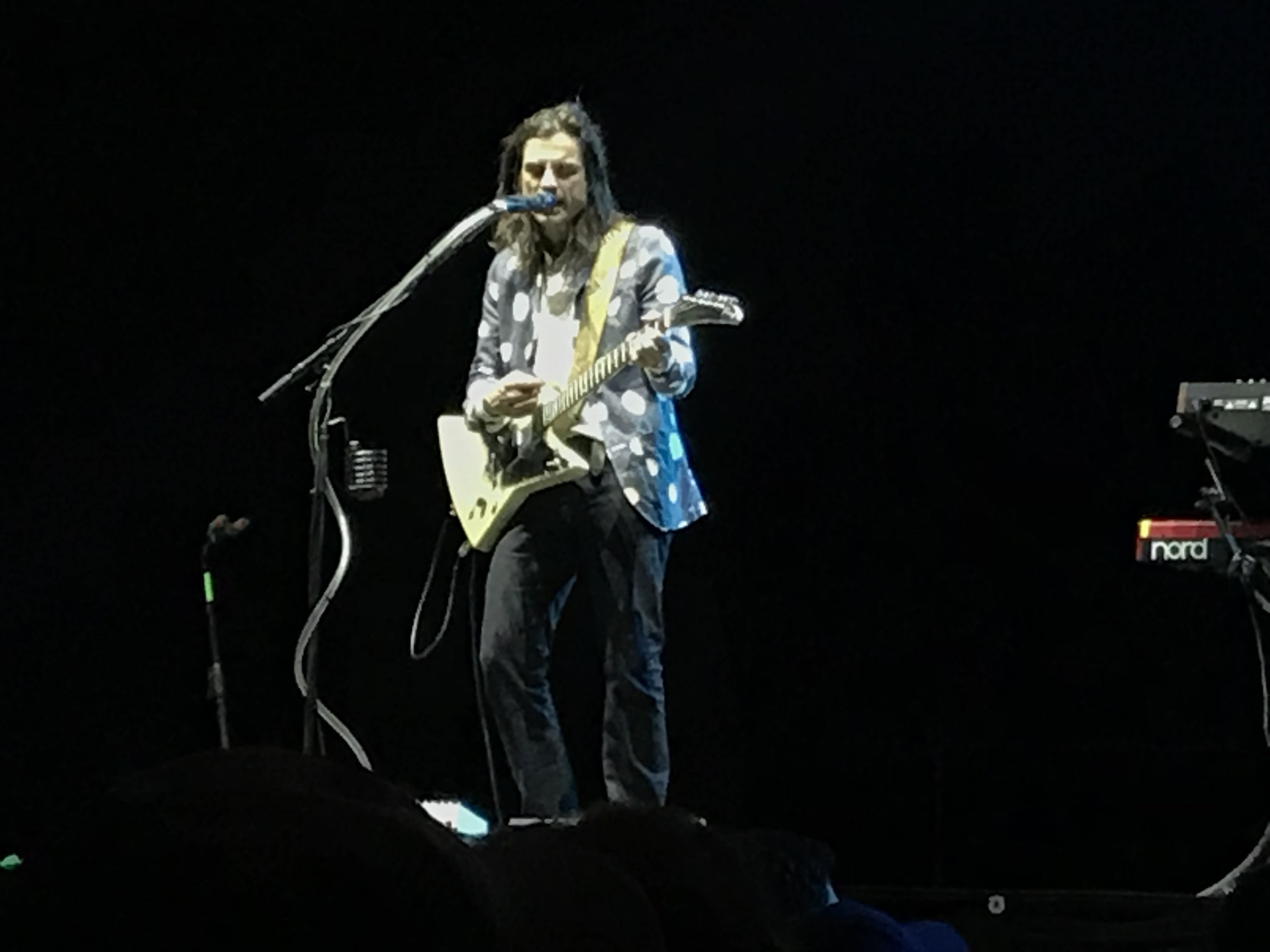
Bell performing with Weezer at Musikfest in Bethlehem, Pennsylvania, in August 2019

=== With Weezer ===
- Weezer (1994)
- Pinkerton (1996)
- Weezer (2001)
- Maladroit (2002)
- Make Believe (2005)
- Weezer (2008)
- Raditude (2009)
- Hurley (2010)
- Death to False Metal (2010)
- Everything Will Be Alright in the End (2014)
- Weezer (2016)
- Pacific Daydream (2017)
- Weezer (2019)
- Weezer (2019)
- OK Human (2021)
- Van Weezer (2021)
- SZNZ: Spring (2022)
- SZNZ: Summer (2022)
- SZNZ: Autumn (2022)
- SZNZ: Winter (2022)
- Weezer (2026)

=== With Space Twins ===
- No Show EP (1994)
- Osaka Aquabus EP (1997)
- TV, Music & Candy EP (1998)
- The End of Imagining (2003)

=== With The Relationship ===
- The Relationship (2010)
- Clara Obscura (2017)

=== With Carnival Art ===
- Dig EP (1990)
- Thrumdrone (1991)
- Welcome to Vas Llegas (1992)
- Blue Food & Black Sparks EP (1992)

=== With Homie ===
- Meet the Deedles soundtrack (1998) – backing vocals on "American Girls"
