= The Rentals discography =

Discography of the alternative rock band The Rentals

- Studio albums: 4
- EPs: 5
- Soundtrack albums: 1
- Compilation albums: 1
- Singles: 24
- Demo albums: 3
- Benefit albums: 1

The discography of the alternative rock band The Rentals consists of four studio albums, one soundtrack album, one compilation album, one benefit album, five extended plays and 24 singles.

== Albums ==
=== Studio albums ===
List of studio albums, with selected chart positions and sales figures
Title	Details	Peak chart positions		Sales
Title	Details	US	US Heat.	Sales
Return of the Rentals	Released: October 31, 1995; Label: Maverick/Reprise; Format: CD, CS	—	19	US: 96,000
Seven More Minutes	Released: April 13, 1999; Label: Maverick; Format: CD, CS	—	23	
Lost in Alphaville	Released: August 25, 2014; Label: Polyvinyl Record Co.; Format: CD, CS, LP, DD	200	3	
Q36	Released: June 26, 2020; Label: Self-released; Format: LP, DD	—	—	
"—" denotes a recording that did not chart or was not released in that territory.

=== Soundtrack albums ===
Title	Details
The Midnight Society Soundtrack (a Matt Sharp / Nick Zinner Score)	Released: October 31, 2022; Label: Self-released; Format: LP, DD

=== Compilation albums ===
Title	Details
Songs About Time	Released: June 16, 2010; Label: Self-released; Format: 4xLP, 4xCD, DD

=== Benefit albums ===
Title	Details
Resilience (AKA Songs About Time: Chapter Four: Tokyo Blues [Instrumental])	Released: April 12, 2011; Label: Ernest Jenning Record Co.; Format: CD, LP, DD

== EPs ==
Title	Details
The Last Little Life EP	Released: August 14, 2007; Label: Boompa; Format: CD, DD
Songs About Time: Chapter One: The Story of a Thousand Seasons Past	Released: April 7, 2009; Label: Self-released; Format: CD, LP, DD
Songs About Time: Chapter Two: It's Time to Come Home	Released: July 7, 2009; Label: Self-released; Format: CD, LP, DD
Songs About Time: Chapter Three: The Future	Released: October 20, 2009; Label: Self-released; Format: CD, LP, DD
Forgotten Astronaut- a Q36 Special Feature	Released: March 31, 2020; Label: Self-released; Format: DD

== Singles ==
List of singles, with selected chart positions, showing year released and album name
Title	Year	Peak chart positions			Album
Title	Year	US	US Airplay	US Modern	Album
"Friends of P."	1995	82	49	7	Return of the Rentals
"Waiting"	1996	—	—	—	Return of the Rentals
"Getting By"	1999	—	—	—	Seven More Minutes
"Sweetness and Tenderness" (new version)	2007	—	—	—	The Last Little Life EP
"Colorado"	2008	—	—	—	Songs About Time: Chapter One
"Thought of Sound"	2014	—	—	—	Lost in Alphaville
"1000 Seasons"	2014	—	—	—	Lost in Alphaville
"Elon Musk Is Making Me Sad"	2017	—	—	—	Non-album single
“Spaceships”	2019	—	—	—	Q36
"Forgotten Astronaut"	2019	—	—	—	Q36
"9th Configuration"	2019	—	—	—	Q36
"Breaking and Breaking and Breaking"	2019	—	—	—	Q36
"Invasion Night"	2019	—	—	—	Q36
"Nowhere Girl"	2020	—	—	—	Q36
"Great Big Blue"	2020	—	—	—	Q36
"Conspiracy"	2020	—	—	—	Q36
"Above This Broken World"	2020	—	—	—	Q36
"Teen Beat Cosmonaut"	2020	—	—	—	Q36
"Another World"	2020	—	—	—	Q36
"Information (and the Island in the Sky)"	2020	—	—	—	Q36
"Machine Love"	2020	—	—	—	Q36
"Goodbye Steve"	2020	—	—	—	Q36
"Shake Your Diamonds"	2020	—	—	—	Q36
"—" denotes a recording that did not chart or was not released in that territory.

== Demo albums ==
- For The Ladies (Early Rentals Session)
- Excellent Stocking Stuffer (demos and rough mixes)
- Little Russel Street (Seven More Minutes rough mixes and demos)
