= Daniel Brummel =

American musician (born 1981)

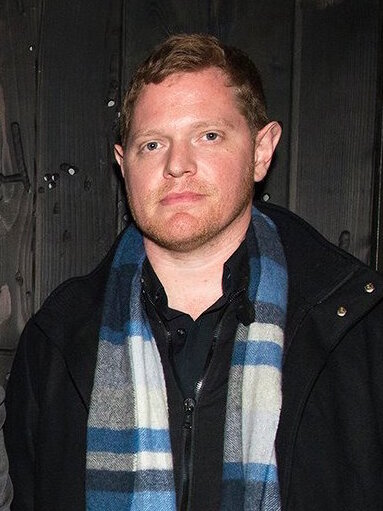
- Brummel with Nada Surf in 2016

Background information
- Born: September 15, 1981 (age 44); Pasadena, California, U.S.
- Genres: Alternative rock; power pop; indie rock; pop punk; progressive rock; jazz fusion
- Occupations: Singer; songwriter; musician; composer; producer
- Years active: 1995–present
- Labels: Kung Fu; Glitterhouse; Southern; Sub Pop; Universal; Sony BMG
- Website: danielbrummel.com

Daniel Brummel (born September 15, 1981 in Pasadena, California) is an American singer-songwriter, composer, producer, and multi-instrumentalist who has performed and recorded with various musical groups including Sanglorians, Ozma, Weezer, Nada Surf, Scott & Rivers, Spain, Gowns, Monstro, and The Elected. He composed the music for the Lifetime network television series American Princess with partners Gwendolyn Sanford and Brandon Jay.

Brummel graduated from the Los Angeles County High School For The Arts in 1999, received his Bachelor of Arts degree in music composition from UCLA in 2006 (where he studied orchestration with Paul Chihara, voice with Don Neuen, and guitar with jazz legend Kenny Burrell) and his Master of Music degree in commercial music from CSULA in 2016. As a singer, bassist, guitarist, keyboardist, and drummer, Brummel has performed consistently on international tours with his various projects since 2001, when The Michigan Daily dubbed him a "pop-culturally aware songsmith" at age 19. He has also led interfaith community music events, sang protest songs, and performed experimental folk music at the Los Angeles County Museum of Art, the Hammer Museum, the Norton Simon Museum, the Los Angeles Central Library, and the International Association for the Study of Popular Music. In March 2011, Brummel was artist-in-residence at Machine Project Gallery in Los Angeles, where he hosted Skylike Notdoings, a series of events exploring the connection between music, meditation, Eastern spirituality, and dreamwork.

Brummel cowrote the song "Eulogy For A Rock Band" with Rivers Cuomo and Ryen Slegr for Weezer’s 2014 album Everything Will Be Alright in the End. He then served as music director and touring member (guitar, keyboards, percussion) for Weezer’s fall 2014 album release tour, coordinating and conducting a new 18 person fan choir in each city. In 2016, he joined Nada Surf as touring bassist for the North American dates of the "You Know Who You Are" album release tour, substituting for original bassist Daniel Lorca and garnering praise for being "as talented of a musician as the band could have asked for to fill in." In academia, he served as the Dean of the California College of Music from 2015-2019, achieving the institution's initial accreditation through the National Association of Schools of Music, and he currently serves as the Chief Academic Officer for Point Blank Music School in Silver Lake.

== Discography ==
=== As a Solo Artist ===
- Speak Easy (Coptic, 2005)
- Switched-On Scarlatti (2019)

=== Sanglorians ===
- Initiation (2013)
- Odalisque (2020)
- Family of Origin (2024)

=== Ozma ===
- Boomtown (2014)
- Pasadena (Sony BMG, 2007)
- Spending Time on the Borderline (Kung Fu, 2003)
- The Doubble Donkey Disc (Kung Fu, 2001)
- Rock and Roll Part Three (Kung Fu, 2000)

=== Weezer ===
- Everything Will Be Alright In The End (Republic, 2014)
- Pacific Daydream (Crush/Atlantic, 2017)

=== Nada Surf ===
- Live on KEXP (Acoustic) (2016)
- Live on KEXP (Electric) (2016)

=== Spain ===
- Sargent Place (Glitterhouse, 2014)
- The Morning Becomes Eclectic Session (Glitterhouse, 2013)
- The Soul of Spain (Glitterhouse, 2012)

=== The Elected ===
- Sun, Sun, Sun (Sub Pop, 2006)
- Me First (Sub Pop, 2004)

=== Scott & Rivers ===
- スコット と リバース (self-titled debut album) (Universal, 2013)
- Nimaime (Sony, 2017)

=== Gowns ===
- Broken Bones (Southern Records, 2008)

=== Jorge Huaman ===
- In Need Of In-Between (2010)

=== Irma ===
- Letter To The Lord (My Major Company, 2011)

=== We Are Me ===
- Living In Transit (Atmosphériques, 2014)

=== Sofa City Sweetheart ===
- Super(b) Exitos (2019)

=== Manisha ===
- All My Sunsets EP (2020)

=== Jonathan Mann ===
- Jewish Family Christmas Tree! (2020)

=== David Prince ===
- No Hard Feelings (2021)

=== The Easy Button (band) ===
- Lost On Purpose (2021)

=== Film/TV Soundtracks ===
- American Princess (2019 TV series) (composer, 10 episodes)
- (Romance) in the Digital Age (2017)
- Kick-Ass 2 (2013)
- Geek USA (2013)
- Still Waiting... (2009)
- Turkish for Beginners (2008)
- iCarly (2008)
- Zoey 101 (2007)
- That Darn Punk (2001)
