= Matt Sharp (album) =

Studio album by Matt Sharp
- Released: October 10, 2004
- Recorded: 2004
- Genre: Folk music
- Label: Boompa
- Producer: Josh Hager, Matt Sharp, Andy Wilkinson, Greg Brown

Matt Sharp chronology
| Puckett's Versus the Country Boy (2003) | Matt Sharp (2004) |

Professional ratings
Review scores
| Source | Rating |
|---|---|
| AllMusic | 3/5 stars |
| Pitchfork Media | 6.3/10 |

Matt Sharp is the only studio album from former Weezer bassist and The Rentals frontman Matt Sharp. It was released in 2004 via Boompa Records. The album does not employ electric guitar, synths, or percussion. Lap steel, acoustic guitar, piano, and organ are the only accompaniment to Sharp's vocals. The album was recorded in Tennessee.

== Critical reception ==
The Detroit Metro Times called it "plaintive music so utterly anguished yet hauntingly beautiful it’s almost too painful to listen to."

== Track listing ==
All tracks are written by Matt Sharp.

| No. | Title | Length |
|---|---|---|
| 1. | "All Those Dreams" | 4:16 |
| 2. | "Goodbye West Coast" | 5:22 |
| 3. | "Every Time In Blue" | 3:32 |
| 4. | "Just Like Movie Stars" | 6:07 |
| 5. | "Shadows" | 3:00 |
| 6. | "Watch the Weather Break" | 5:41 |
| 7. | "Let Me Pass" | 4:32 |
| 8. | "Thoughts From a Slow Train" | 6:10 |
| 9. | "After the Angels" | 6:32 |
| 10. | "Before You Go" | 5:14 |
| 11. | "Some Days" | 8:25 |
| Total length: | | 57:31 |
