= Ryen Slegr =

American musician; founding member of rock band Ozma

- Born: April 14, 1979 (age 46); Ithaca, New York, U.S.
- Genres: Power pop; progressive rock; nerd rock; electronic; experimental
- Occupations: Singer-songwriter; musician; composer; producer; engineer
- Instruments: Vocals; guitar; keyboards
- Years active: 1994–present
- Labels: Kung Fu Records; Polyvinyl Record Co.; Universal Records; Sony BMG
- Member of: Ozma
- Formerly of: The Rentals

Ryen Slegr is an American musician best known for being a member of the rock band Ozma. He is also affiliated with The Rentals, Weezer, and Rachel Haden.

== The Rentals ==
In 2006, Slegr performed with The Rentals on their U.S. tour with Ozma. He also engineered and played guitar on The Rentals' 2014 Polyvinyl release Lost in Alphaville.

== Weezer ==
Slegr co-wrote the song "Eulogy for a Rock Band" on Weezer's 2014 Universal Records release Everything Will Be Alright in the End.

== Miscellaneous ==
In 2012, Slegr played guitar and keyboards for Rachel Haden at several shows in Los Angeles and San Francisco in a band with Adam Phaler of Jawbreaker and Warren Defever of His Name is Alive.

== Education ==
Slegr graduated from the University of California, Los Angeles with a degree in history. He also studied Japanese court music called Gagaku at UCLA and took various music classes at Pasadena City College, including Spud Murphy's Equal Interval System.

== Discography ==
=== Ozma ===
- Rock and Roll Part Three (Kung Fu, 2000)
- The Doubble Donkey Disc (Kung Fu, 2001)
- Spending Time on the Borderline (Kung Fu, 2003)
- Pasadena (About A Girl/Sony BMG, 2007)
- Boomtown (2014)

=== The Rentals ===
- The Last Little Life EP (Boompa Records, 2007)
- Songs About Time (2009)
- Lost in Alphaville (Polyvinyl Record Co., 2014)

=== Weezer ===
- "Everything Will Be Alright In The End" (2014)

=== Ryen Slegr ===
- Eleven Runners (2011)
