= Lisa Lobsinger =

Canadian indie rock singer

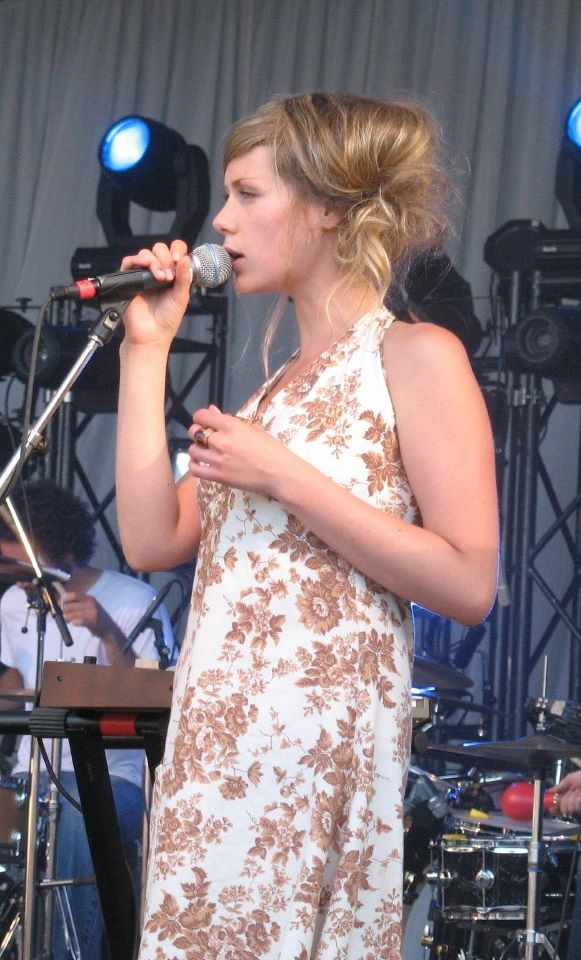
- Performing with Broken Social Scene at Deer Lake Park in 2006.

Background information
- Origin: Calgary, Alberta, Canada
- Genres: Pop rock
- Occupation: Singer
- Instrument: Voice
- Years active: 2001–present
- Label: Bell

Lisa Dawn Lobsinger is an indie rock singer from Calgary, Alberta, Canada. She is the lead singer for the band Reverie Sound Revue and is known for her powerful voice and distinctive hair styles. Reverie Sound Revue has released an extended play and a studio album.

Lobsinger is a recurring frontwoman of Broken Social Scene after initially filling in for rotary singers Leslie Feist, Amy Millan, and Emily Haines. She has since contributed to their studio albums, Forgiveness Rock Record (2010), Hug of Thunder (2017) and Remember the Humans (2026).

Lobsinger has recorded with the bands The Summerlad and The Dudes. She has also lent vocals to the Shad album TSOL. Her current project is Laser, an electro-pop trio with Paul Pfisterer (of The Beauties) and Marty Kinack. Their debut album, Night Driver was released in January 2016.

== Discography ==
Featured in Had Enough of It (The Dudes, 2009)

All to All (Broken Social Scene & John McEntire, 2010)

Art House Director (Broken Social Scene & John McEntire, 2010)

Highway Slipper Jam (Broken Social Scene & John McEntire, 2010)

Featured in Lucky 1's (Shad, 2010)

Romance to the Grave (Broken Social Scene & John McEntire, 2010)

Featured in Rose Garden (Shad, 2010)

Featured in Telephone (Shad, 2010)

Texico Bitches (Broken Social Scene, 2010)

Featured in Intro: Lost (Shad, 2013)

Victim Lover (Broken Social Scene, 2017)

Towers and Masons (Broken Social Scene, 2017)

Featured in Erased The Night (Smalltown DJs, 2017)

Featured in Breathe (Smalltown DJs, 2021)
