= Lost in Alphaville =

Studio album by the Rentals
- Released: August 22, 2014
- Recorded: 2013
- Studios: Los Angeles, Nashville and New Orleans
- Genre: Alternative rock
- Length: 40:19
- Label: Polyvinyl
- Producers: Matt Sharp, The Rentals

The Rentals chronology
Songs About Time (2009)	Lost in Alphaville (2014)	Q36 (2020)

Singles from Lost in Alphaville
- 1. "Thought of Sound" Released: June 4, 2014; 2. "1000 Seasons" Released: July 23, 2014

Lost in Alphaville is the third full-length studio album by the Rentals, released on August 25, 2014, through Polyvinyl. The album is available on CD, vinyl, cassette and as a digital download. It marks the band's first full-length album since their 1999 release Seven More Minutes and their first-ever release through Polyvinyl, with whom they signed in December 2013.

== Background and recording ==
After The Rentals disbanded following the tour for 1999's Seven More Minutes, the band reunited in 2005 and released The Last Little Life EP as well as four mini-albums as part of their multimedia project Songs About Time throughout 2009.

On December 5, 2013, Matt Sharp announced that The Rentals had signed with Polyvinyl Records for the release of their forthcoming studio album, which would be their first full-length in 15 years. The album, recorded in Los Angeles, Nashville and New Orleans, is mostly made up of newly rerecorded songs from Songs About Time and features The Black Keys' drummer Patrick Carney, Lucius' Jess Wolfe and Holly Laessig on vocals, Ozma's guitarist Ryen Slegr and Lauren Chipman of The Section Quartet on viola and piano. Sharp and the band are credited with producing the album and it was mixed by Grammy-winning producer Dave Sardy.

== Critical reception ==
Professional ratings
Aggregate scores
Source	Rating
Metacritic	69/100
Review scores
Source	Rating
AllMusic	4/5 stars
The A.V. Club	C+
Consequence of Sound	C
DIY	3/5 stars
NME	7/10
Paste	8/10
Pitchfork	6.9/10
PopMatters	6/10 discs
Sputnikmusic	4/5 stars
Under the Radar	7.5/10 stars

Lost in Alphaville received mostly positive feedback from music critics. At Metacritic, which assigns a normalized rating out of 100 to reviews from mainstream critics, the album has an average score of 69 out of 100, which indicates "generally favorable reviews" based on 13 reviews.

Tim Sendra of AllMusic called the album "a huge-sounding modern indie rock album with a glossy sheen on the surface, but all kinds of heart beating just below." Giving the album an eight out of ten rating, Jeff Milo of Paste wrote, "It’s far from the slapped-together shambolic style of '90s power-pop; no, this sounds much more arranged, almost like tightened chamber pop if it were clouded by the murk of shoegaze."

== Track listing ==
All tracks are written by Matt Sharp.

No.	Title	Length
1.	"It's Time to Come Home"	4:00
2.	"Traces of Our Tears"	3:25
3.	"Stardust"	2:48
4.	"1000 Seasons"	3:15
5.	"Damaris"	4:54
6.	"Irrational Things"	4:14
7.	"Thought of Sound"	3:44
8.	"Song of Remembering"	3:37
9.	"Seven Years"	4:34
10.	"The Future"	5:48
Total length:		40:19

Japanese edition with bonus track
No.	Title	Length
11.	"Thought of Sound" (outtake)	3:22
Total length:		43:41

== Personnel ==
Credits adapted from AllMusic:

The Rentals

- Matt Sharp – vocals, bass guitar, synthesizers
- Jess Wolfe – vocals
- Holly Laessig – vocals
- Ryen Slegr – guitars, lap steel guitar
- Patrick Carney – drums, percussion
- Lauren Chipman – Fender Rhodes, organ, piano, viola, violin

Additional musicians

- Joey Santiago – guitar
- Danielle Belén – violin
- Jamie Blake – breathing, vocal effect
- Roger Moutenot – percussion
- Dan Joeright – drum loop, percussion
- The West Los Angeles Children's Choir

Technical personnel

- The Rentals – production
- Matt Sharp – engineer, production
- Roger Moutenot – engineer
- Adam Bednarik – engineer
- Dave Sardy – mixing
- Patrick Doyle – engineer, preparation engineer
- Andy Brohard – mixing
- Cameron Barton – mixing assistant
- Ryan Smith – mastering
- Lauren Chipman – choir director
- Bryan Bos – artwork, design
- Tim Reynolds – artwork, design

== Charts ==
Chart (2014)	Peak position
US Billboard 200	200
US Heatseekers Albums (Billboard)	7

== Release history ==
Region	Date	Format(s)	Label
United States	August 25, 2014	CD; Digital download; vinyl; cassette	Polyvinyl
