= Grey Eyes =

Studio album by The Salteens
- Released: October 12, 2010
- Genre: Indie pop
- Label: Boompa
- Producer: Todd Simko, Scott Walker

The Salteens chronology
Let Go Of Your Bad Days (2003)	Grey Eyes (2010)

see also Eye colour#Grey

Professional ratings
Review scores
Source	Rating
Allmusic	link
The New Music	(8/10) link
EYEWEEKLY	link
CHART attack	(4/5)

Grey Eyes is the third studio album by a Canadian indie pop band The Salteens. Released on October 12, 2010, this was a new studio album by the band 7 years after they released their second studio album Let Go of Your Bad Days.

This is the band's first album with Carrie Tennent as a member. Erin Jane, who was in the band for the album Let Go of Your Bad Days, had left the band.

== Track listing ==
All songs by Scott L.D. Walker (SOCAN); except 'Savings and Loans' words by Carrie Tennant, music by Scott L.D. Walker.

No.	Title	Length
1.	"Last Train From London"	3:32
2.	"You're Taking All Of This Too Far"	4:15
3.	"Everything They Know About Us"	3:29
4.	"Weird Times"	5:24
5.	"Hallowed Days"	3:13
6.	"Savings and Loans"	3:33
7.	"If Love Is Gone Where Do We Come From Here"	3:30
8.	"Go On"	2:49
9.	"You Stayed Up With The Lights On"	3:27
10.	"Don't Break My Heart"	4:26

== Personnel ==
=== The Salteens ===
- Scott Walker - vocals, mandolin, piano
- Carrie Tennant - vocals, piano, clarinet
- Dion Willis - drums, vocals
- Kevin Cooper - double bass, electric bass, vocals
- Robert Calder - trumpet, baritone, flugelhorn

=== Additional musicians and production ===
- Alison Gorman - trumpet, baritone, flugelho
- Bryan Milks - tenor sax, clarinet, bass clarinet
- Tim Sars - bari sax, flute
- Carol Dymond- flute
- Todd Simko - guitars on 'Go On' and 'Last Train From London'
- Todd Simko and Scott Walker - producing
- Todd Simko - recording
- Ryan Morey - mastering at Ryebread Mastering
- Shawn Penner and John Raham - engineering at Mushroom Studios and at Ogre Studios respectively
