= 1blackfrend =

American indie rock band

- Origin: Jacksonville, Florida, U.S.
- Genres: Indie rock; Garage rock; Alternative rock; Punk
- Years active: 2024–present
- Members: Randi Johnson; Grant Nielsen; Chris Poland
- Website: 1blackfrend.com

1blackfrend is an American indie rock band based in Jacksonville, Florida. The group is led by Detroit-born singer, guitarist and songwriter Randi Johnson, alongside Grant Nielsen on bass and Chris Poland on drums; guitarist Ivan Skenes performs with the band on a recurring basis. Formed in 2024, the band plays a loud, cathartic style that reviewers have characterized as a mix of indie rock, garage rock, alternative rock and punk, with noted grunge and soul influences and comparisons to acts such as Weezer, the Yeah Yeah Yeahs and the Rentals. Sarcastic, self-deprecating humor is a secondary but defining part of the band's identity, carried through its live shows and a satirical online presence, including the tongue-in-cheek biography on its official website. As of 2026 the band has released three singles: "Anchor" (2025), "Gaslight" (2026) and "She Said" (2026).

== History ==
1blackfrend is centered on Randi Johnson, a self-taught musician and songwriter from Detroit who has lived in the Southern United States for several years. Bassist Grant Nielsen and drummer Chris Poland are described as longtime career musicians, and guitarist Ivan Skenes performs with the group on a recurring basis.

The band performed its first show as a group in late 2024 at Bedlam in the Mayport area of Jacksonville. Johnson has said that in its first year the band set three goals for itself: to release a single, to play a show outside its home market, and to perform at the Springfield PorchFest, all of which it completed. During that first year the band also played a small number of shows outside Jacksonville, reaching as far as Central Florida.

The group released its debut single "Anchor" on November 21, 2025. It followed with "Gaslight" on January 1, 2026, and "She Said" on February 20, 2026. All three singles were issued independently, without a record label, and the band's songs are published through 1BF Publishing.

== Musical style ==
Critics have placed 1blackfrend's sound at the intersection of indie rock, garage rock and alternative rock, often emphasizing its punk energy. Writing for American Pancake, Robb Donker Curtius described the trio as "punk hearted" alt rock with garage rock, soul and grunge elements, and connected the group to the Detroit garage, soul and proto-punk lineage. Coverage of "She Said" compared the band's melodic approach to Weezer and the Rentals, while reviews of "Anchor" cited Weezer and the Yeah Yeah Yeahs.

== Views on social media and the music industry ==
In interviews, 1blackfrend has voiced ambivalence about the expectation that contemporary musicians also act as "content creators". Johnson has said that producing the short videos and clips favored by social media draws focus away from the music itself, and has expressed concern about the platforms' effects on mental health. The band regards social media and streaming services as necessary but approaches them with caution, and has said it measures success through modest, self-set goals rather than online metrics.

== Members ==
Current members

- Randi Johnson – lead vocals, guitar
- Grant Nielsen – bass, backing vocals
- Chris Poland – drums, backing vocals

Recurring performer

- Ivan Skenes – guitar

== Discography ==
=== Singles ===
- "Anchor" (2025)
- "Gaslight" (2026)
- "She Said" (2026)

=== Single track listings ===
"Anchor", released November 21, 2025, was written by Johnson during a period of severe depression and reframes what began as a farewell note into a song about resilience.

No.	Title	Length
1.	"Anchor"	3:26

"Gaslight", released on January 1, 2026, addresses an ex-friend who, in Johnson's words, "rewrote my reality" through psychological manipulation; reviewers noted a mid-song shift into heavier, more aggressive territory.

No.	Title	Length
1.	"Gaslight"	4:16

"She Said", released February 20, 2026, is a breakup song about the decline of a long relationship and the loss of identity that can follow.

No.	Title	Length
1.	"She Said"	3:08
