= Let Go of Your Bad Days =

Studio album by The Salteens
- Released: April 22, 2003
- Recorded: 2003
- Genre: Rock, pop
- Label: Boompa
- Producer: Kevin Kane

The Salteens chronology
Short-Term Memories (2000)	Let Go of Your Bad Days (2003)	Grey Eyes (2010)

Professional ratings
Review scores
Source	Rating
Allmusic	link

Let Go of Your Bad Days is the second album released by Canadian power pop group The Salteens.

== Track listing ==
No.	Title	Length
1.	"Let Go of Your Bad Days"	3:51
2.	"Damn You"	3:29
3.	"You Stood Out from the Crowd"	1:55
4.	"Look Up! Look Out!"	3:28
5.	"Turnpike"	1:06
6.	"Summer's Gone"	2:48
7.	"Not for Nothing"	2:48
8.	"Thoughts from Sound"	3:02
9.	"Time You Have Been Wasting"	4:20
10.	"Home Again"	1:36
