= The Last Little Life EP =

EP by The Rentals
- Released: August 14, 2007
- Genres: Alternative rock, power pop
- Length: 17:21
- Label: Boompa

The Rentals chronology
Seven More Minutes (1999)	The Last Little Life EP (2007)	Songs About Time (2009)

Professional ratings
Review scores
Source	Rating
AllMusic	3.5/5 stars

The Last Little Life EP is the first EP by the American rock band the Rentals and was the first collection of new material from the band in more than eight years. Recorded by drummer Dan Joeright in his Hollywood studio (dubbed Outer Space Studio), The Last Little Life was released on August 14, 2007. In addition to three brand new tracks, the EP also includes a new reworking of "Sweetness and Tenderness", originally from the group's 1995 debut Return of the Rentals. Their third full-length album was to follow after the EP's release, but it was replaced by the multimedia project Songs About Time in 2009. A third album, named Lost in Alphaville, was eventually released in 2014 to positive reviews.

The title The Last Little Life comes from the first word of the three new songs on the album: "Last Romantic Day", "Little Bit of You in Everything", "Life Without a Brain".

== Track listing ==
All tracks are written by Matt Sharp.

No.	Title	Length
1.	"Last Romantic Day"	3:53
2.	"Little Bit of You in Everything"	3:40
3.	"Life Without a Brain"	3:21
4.	"Sweetness and Tenderness (New Version)"	6:27

== Personnel ==
- Matt Sharp – vocals, acoustic guitar, synthesizers
- Rachel Haden – bass guitar, vocals, synthesizers
- Sara Radle – guitar, vocals, piano, synthesizers, glockenspiel
- Ben Pringle – synthesizers, trombone, acoustic guitar, vocals
- Lauren Chipman – viola, vocals, synthesizers
- Dan Joeright – drums, percussion, vocals, engineer, producer
