= Rock and Roll Part Three =

Studio album by Ozma
- Released: January 1, 2000
- Genres: Indie pop; power pop; geek rock; emo pop
- Length: 45:27
- Label: Tornado Recordings

Ozma chronology
Rock and Roll Part Three (2000)	The Doubble Donkey Disc (2001)

Rock and Roll Part Three is the debut studio album by American rock band Ozma. It was self-released by Ozma's own imprint Tornado Recordings on January 1, 2000 and re-released for national distribution by Kung Fu Records on August 21, 2001.

== Music and lyrics ==
Often classified as power pop or geek rock, Rock and Roll Part Three relies heavily on uptempo songs with distorted guitar and keyboards. A strongly nostalgic album, many of the songs contain backward-looking lyrics and catchy choruses. Comparisons are often drawn with Weezer, The Rentals, and The Get-Up Kids.

== Reception ==
Professional ratings
Review scores
Source	Rating
AllMusic	4/5 stars

Bradley Torreano, writing for AllMusic, stated that with this album, Ozma has "arguably written the best Weezer album of 2001 (and yes, the real thing also had an album come out the same year)." The "11 slabs of infectiously singable power pop on this little-album-that-could" compelled Weezer frontman Rivers Cuomo to insist that Ozma open two nationwide tours for Weezer in 2001 and 2002. In an "Ask Me Anything" interview on the website Reddit, Cuomo recommended Rock and Roll Part Three in response to what two albums every Weezer fan should listen to (the other album being Pet Sounds).

== Track listing ==
All tracks are written by Ryen Slegr, Jose Galvez and Daniel Brummel, except where noted.

No.	Title	Writer(s)	Length
1.	"Domino Effect"	Slegr, Brummel	3:31
2.	"Apple Trees"	Slegr, Brummel	3:22
3.	"Shooting Stars"		4:07
4.	"Natalie Portman"	Brummel	3:49
5.	"The Ups and Downs"		2:51
6.	"If I Only Had a Heart"		3:14
7.	"Baseball"		5:35
8.	"Rocks"		1:57
9.	"Battlescars"	Slegr, Brummel	8:38
10.	"In Search of 1988"		4:26
11.	"Last Dance"	Slegr, Brummel	3:57
Total length:			45:27

== Personnel ==
- Ryen Slegr - vocals, guitar
- Daniel Brummel - vocals, bass
- Jose Galvez - guitar, vocals
- Star Wick - keyboards
- Patrick Edwards - drums

== Popular culture ==
The song "Rocks" was heard in the Nickelodeon teen sitcom iCarly, in the 2008 episode iMight Switch Schools.
