= Puckett's Versus the Country Boy =

EP by Matt Sharp
- Released: June 17, 2003
- Recorded: 2003
- Genre: Folk music
- Label: In Music We Trust
- Producer: Matt Sharp

Matt Sharp chronology
Puckett's Versus the Country Boy (2003)	Matt Sharp (2004)

Professional ratings
Review scores
Source	Rating
Allmusic	link
Pitchfork Media	5.5/10 link

Puckett's Versus the Country Boy is the first and only solo EP by Matt Sharp, famous for his time as the bassist of Weezer and as the frontman of The Rentals. The EP marked Sharp's return to the music world so to speak, being his first release since The Rentals went on hiatus in 1999. Different from previous efforts in his catalogue, the EP features no electric guitar, synths, or percussion. Instead the album is comprised fully of lap steel, acoustic guitar, piano, organ, and Sharp's vocals. This release also sees a shift in Sharp's musical style from the alt-rock he is known for into the land of folk. This shift set the stage for Sharp's self titled and lone solo studio album, Matt Sharp.

== Track listing ==
All tracks are written by Matt Sharp.

No.	Title	Length
1.	"Goodbye West Coast"	3:25
2.	"Some Come Running Through"	5:22
3.	"Visions of Anna"	6:10
4.	"Hey, What You Gonna Do?"	5:21
Total length:		20:19
