= Reverie Sound Revue (album) =

Studio album by Reverie Sound Revue
- Released: June 23, 2009
- Recorded: August 2006 to January 2008 at Spanish Jewels Recorders, Audities Foundation, Mono Cliffs, and Chateau De Pape
- Genre: Indie rock
- Length: 39:15
- Label: Boompa Records
- Producer: Marc De Pape

Reverie Sound Revue chronology
Reverie Sound Revue (2003)	Reverie Sound Revue (2009)

Reverie Sound Revue is the first studio album by Canadian indie rock band Reverie Sound Revue, fronted by Broken Social Scene member Lisa Lobsinger. The album was financed by the Government of Canada, through the Canada Music Fund and Canada's private radio broadcasters. The total time to make the album spanned seven years, and it features "moody Britpop" as a main influence. The album received positive reviews, with critics generally complimenting Lobsinger's vocals.

== Background ==
After releasing Reverie Sound Revue in 2003 and gaining fans in the local music scene, the band disbanded. Member Marc de Pape became interested in reforming the band when he made a demo for a song he wrote, with Lisa Lobsinger providing vocals. He would then record instrumental tracks, and sent them to the other band members via e-mail for them to play other instruments. De Pape also made a few music videos to hype the album, while it was still being mixed and mastered. Instead of going on tour to promote the album due to members being busy, de Pape made and released a set of promotional live videos online. He stated that their process of recording the album "removed certain pressures that go with being in a band," and said that "[the album] is our debut record, not our debut as a band".

== Reception ==
Professional ratings
Review scores
Source	Rating
Under the Radar	6/10 stars

The album has received generally positive reviews from critics. Erica Lenti of Shred News said that the album is "musically captivating" and that "Reverie Sound Revue is a band that has grown to be exceptionally talented at what they do." A positive review from Fast Forward Weekly stated the album is "a sonically beautiful experience, but a fleeting one", and also wrote that "the production is slicker and the songwriting a little more sophisticated [than Reverie Sound Revue]". Laura Studarus of Under the Radar gave the album a 6 out of 10 and said that "the album hangs together remarkably well," but also described the album as "music that hangs on such easily overlooked and understated charm".

== Track listing ==
All tracks written by Marc de Pape.

No.	Title	Length
1.	"An Anniversary Away"	4:19
2.	"We Are The Opposite of Thieves"	2:22
3.	"Prelude to a Debut"	3:53
4.	"Pretty One Play"	3:51
5.	"Arrows"	3:21
6.	"In Hotel Homes"	3:57
7.	"Off Rooftops"	3:26
8.	"I Could be Dangerous"	3:00
9.	"You Don't Exist if I Don't See You"	2:52
10.	"May Be First May Be Second"	4:01
11.	"The Leisure Lost"	4:13

== Personnel ==
The people involved in the making of Reverie Sound Revue are:

Reverie Sound Revue

- Marc de Pape – guitar
- John-Marcel de Waal – drums, bass
- Bryce Gracey – bass guitar
- Lisa Lobsinger – vocals
- Patrick Walls – guitar

Additional instruments

- Carolyn Blackwell – viola on "Off Rooftops"

Production

- Marc de Pape – producer, recorded overdubs, recorded "Off Rooftops"
- Marty Kinack – recorded vocals
- Steve Major – mixing
- Diego Medina – recorded instruments
- Noah Mintz, Lacquer Channel Mastering – mastering

Design

- Amber Albrecht – illustrations
- Marc de Pape, Erin Nicholson – design and layout
