= Short-Term Memories =

Studio album by The Salteens
- Released: 2000
- Genre: indie pop
- Length: 25:15
- Label: Endearing

The Salteens chronology
Short-Term Memories (2000)	Let Go of Your Bad Days (2003)

Professional ratings
Review scores
Source	Rating
Allmusic	3/5 stars

Short-Term Memories is the first studio album by the Canadian indie pop band The Salteens released in 2000 on Endearing Records.

== Track listing ==
No.	Title	Length
1.	"Kelly Nicoll"	2:18
2.	"Bubba Da"	2:20
3.	"The Best Thought"	3:09
4.	"Crash the Market"	2:09
5.	"Culture"	2:57
6.	"Guy Dog"	1:54
7.	"Caught at the Cusp"	2:39
8.	"show stopper"	2:02
9.	"Emptyhead"	3:46
10.	"Nice Day"	2:01
Total length:		25:15
