= Smalltown DJs =

Canadian musical duo

Smalltown DJs are a Canadian electronic dance music duo from Calgary, Alberta, consisting of Pete Emes and Mike Grimes. They are most noted for their single "Concorde Groove", which was a Juno Award nominee for Underground Dance Single of the Year at the Juno Awards of 2024.

They first formed in the late 1990s, launching a club night called Hai Karate. As recording artists they have released a number of their own singles, as well as collaborations with artists such as Lisa Lobsinger, Wax Romeo and Shad.
