= Lullaby Baxter =

Canadian jazz singer

- Born: Angelina Teresa Iapaolo; 1970 (age 55–56); Scarborough, Ontario, Canada
- Genres: Jazz
- Occupation: Singer
- Instrument: Vocals
- Labels: Atlantic, Boompa

Lullaby Baxter (born Angelina Teresa Iapaolo in 1970) is a Canadian jazz singer. Her first album, Capable Egg, was released in 2000 by Atlantic Records, and her 2006 album Garden Cities of To-morrow was released by Boompa Records.

The Village Voice has called her "cerebrally seductive" and compared her to Peggy Lee, while Pitchfork Media has compared her to Ella Fitzgerald.

Born in Scarborough, Ontario, Canada, she is the sister-in-law of jazz musician Steve Kirby.
