= Sanglorians =

- Origin: Los Angeles, California, United States
- Genres: Power pop, baroque pop, progressive rock
- Years active: 2010–present
- Labels: Sludge People, Killer Kern
- Members: Daniel Brummel: Jonathan Gomez; Jeremy Forman; Jesse Griffith; Juan Antonio Lopez
- Past members: Matt Mayhall: Jeremy Keeler; Morgan Paros; Ihui Wu; Andrew Lessman
- Website: http://www.sanglorians.com/

Sanglorians are an American rock band from Los Angeles, California. Sanglorians were formed in late 2010 by lead singer/songwriter Daniel Brummel along with guitarist Jonathan Gomez, bassist Jeremy Keeler, keyboardist/trumpeter Ihui Wu, violinist Morgan Paros and drummer Matt Mayhall. Their debut album Initiation was released in October 2013 featuring this lineup. The follow-up Odalisque appeared in 2020, which the label Sludge People called "equal parts high-polish studio masterpiece and stunning indie outsider art, already a cult classic in the making." In 2024, the band released the holiday album Family of Origin, featuring Corey Fogel of The Mae Shi on drums and vocals from Brummel's 8-year-old daughter, Aurelia Brummel.

== Band members ==
Current

- Daniel Brummel – lead vocals, guitar
- Jonathan Gomez – guitar, vocals
- Jeremy Forman – bass, vocals
- Jesse Griffith – drums
- Juan Antonio Lopez – keys, vocals

Former

- Matt Mayhall – drums (2011–2013)
- Andrew Lessman - drums (2013)
- Jeremy Keeler - bass, backing vocals (2011-2021)
- Jon Oswald - drums
- Morgan Paros - violin, vocals (2011-2020)
- Ihui Wu - keyboards, trumpet, backing vocals (2011-2019)

== Discography ==
- Initiation (2013)
- Odalisque (2020)
- Family of Origin (2024)
