= Reverie Sound Revue (EP) =

- Cover of the first release

EP by Reverie Sound Revue
- Released: August 26, 2003 (re-release)
- Genre: New wave, indie rock
- Length: 33:34
- Language: English
- Label: Boompa
- Producer: Reverie Sound Revue, Dave Alcock

Reverie Sound Revue chronology
Reverie Sound Revue (2003)	Reverie Sound Revue (2009)

Reverie Sound Revue is the title of Reverie Sound Revue's first EP, and their debut release. The EP was released independently in 2003. It received positive reviews in the local music scene.

This EP has been released three times. The first release included only the first 6 tracks, the re-release with a new cover, and 8 total tracks. The most recent re-release was distributed by Boompa, digitally, and excluded the track "Cascade." Physically, the EP is now out of print.

== Track listing ==
1. "Walking Around Waiting Downtown"
2. "It's All the Same"
3. "Rip the Universe"
4. "Passes & Passports"
5. "The A.M."
6. "One Marathon"
7. "Cascade"
8. "In the New"

=== Notes ===
- All tracks written and performed by Reverie Sound Revue.
- Tracks 1 to 6 produced by Reverie Sound Revue and Dave Alcock.
- Tracks 7 and 8 engineered and mastered by Jonathon Stevens.
