= Matt Sharp =

American musician (born 1969)

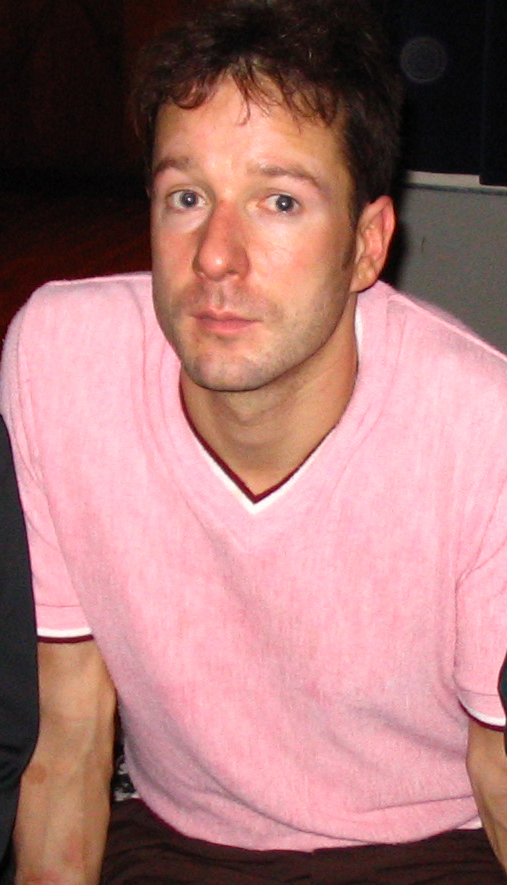
- Matt Sharp after a solo tour show at the W.O.W. Hall in Eugene, Oregon, in 2004

Background information
- Born: Matthew Kelly Sharp; September 22, 1969 (age 57); Bangkok, Thailand
- Origin: Arlington County, Virginia, U.S.
- Genres: Alternative rock; power pop; pop-punk; emo; indie rock
- Occupations: Musician; songwriter
- Instruments: Bass guitar; vocals; guitar; synthesizer; drums; Rubab
- Years active: 1985–present
- Labels: Geffen; Maverick; Reprise; In Music We Trust; Boompa
- Member of: The Rentals
- Formerly of: Weezer; Homie

Matthew Kelly Sharp (born September 22, 1969) is an American musician. Between 1992 and 1998, he was the bassist for the rock band Weezer, which he co-founded. He appears on their first two albums, the Blue Album (1994) and Pinkerton (1996). In 1994, Sharp founded the Rentals, who have released five albums. Sharp has also released an EP and an album as a solo artist.

== Early life ==
Matt Sharp was born in Bangkok, Thailand, to American parents on September 22, 1969. The family moved to Arlington, Virginia, when he was one year old. At the age of nine, he made his first musical purchase, a 45 rpm single of the song "Le Freak" by Chic. At sixteen, he moved to San Diego, California.

In 1989, Sharp started fronting a goth band, the Clique, which lasted less than a year. A few months after the Clique disbanded, Sharp befriended the drummer Patrick Wilson, with whom he created the band 60 Wrong Sausages. The guitarist Jason Cropper soon joined. Around this time, Wilson was also in another band, Fuzz, with the guitarist and vocalist Rivers Cuomo. For a brief period, Cuomo, Wilson and Sharp shared an apartment. During this time, Sharp worked as a telemarketer.

== Career ==
=== 1991–1999: Weezer and the Rentals ===
In mid-1991, Sharp moved north to Berkeley, California, to pursue what the Weezer collaborator Karl Koch described as "some sorta symphonic keyboard sequencing music". In January 1992, Wilson showed Sharp material he and Cuomo had been working on. Impressed, Sharp returned to Los Angeles to join the band. Sharp became the group's bassist and de facto manager.

Cuomo, Wilson, Sharp and Cropper formed Weezer in 1992. Their first show was on March 19, 1992, closing for Keanu Reeves' band Dogstar. Cuomo gave Sharp one year to get the band a record deal before Cuomo accepted a scholarship at the University of California, Berkeley. In November, Weezer recorded a demo, The Kitchen Tape, including a version of the future Weezer single "Say It Ain't So". The demo was heard by Todd Sullivan, an A&R man at Geffen Records, who signed Weezer in June 1993.

Weezer released their self-titled debut album in May 1994. It was certified platinum in January 1995. In early 1994, Sharp founded the Rentals. They released their debut album, Return of the Rentals, the following year, which featured the radio hit "Friends of P". Weezer's second album, Pinkerton, was released in September 1996. With a darker, more abrasive sound, Pinkerton was a commercial and critical failure, but attained critical acclaim later. Following the mixed response to Pinkerton, Weezer went on a five-year hiatus. The third verse of Lush's 1996 song "Ladykillers" is about Sharp.

In 1998, Sharp left Weezer due to differences with the band members. In 2016, he said of his departure: "I don't really know how to speak on this because I don't know what should be kept private and what should be shared. I certainly have my view of it, as I'm sure everybody else has their sort of foggy things. When you have a group that doesn't communicate, you're going to have a whole lot of different stories."

In 1999, the Rentals released their second album, Seven More Minutes. Among its contributors were Damon Albarn (of Blur and Gorillaz), Donna Matthews (of Elastica), Miki Berenyi (of Lush), and Tim Wheeler (of Ash). Maya Rudolph (later of Saturday Night Live) was a member of the touring band during this time. The track "My Head is in the Sun" was co-written with Cuomo. The album sold considerably less than Return of the Rentals, and the Rentals went on hiatus in late 1999.

=== 2000–2003: Solo records and Weezer lawsuit ===
Sharp moved to the town of Leiper's Fork, Tennessee, and began recording. In an interview with MTV News, Sharp said he was trying to cut ties to the music world. Sharp went on an acoustic tour in 2002 with former Cake guitarist Greg Brown. In 2003, after a four-year hiatus, Sharp returned with an EP, Puckett's Versus the Country Boy.

On April 19, 2002, Sharp filed a five-count federal lawsuit against Weezer. He alleged he was owed royalties for co-writing Weezer's first hit, "Undone – The Sweater Song", and that he owned a 25% interest in the first nine tracks of Pinkerton, which had been credited solely to Cuomo despite all four band members working on the album. Sharp also said he had handled most of Weezer's business affairs during their early success, including the hiring of accountants and attorneys and securing their record deal. The lawsuit also stated that Cuomo was going to ask Sharp to appear in the music video for their 2001 song "Island in the Sun". Finally, Sharp additionally charged his former bandmates Patrick Wilson and Brian Bell with breach of fiduciary duty, legal malpractice, dissolution of partnership, and declaratory relief. The lawsuit was settled out of court.

=== 2003–present: Reunion with Cuomo, re-formation of the Rentals ===
People come up to me and say, "By the way, the last two Weezer records really sucked," and they're always saying it to get in good with me. And I haven't heard them. But if they were bad, they'd probably be just as bad if I was there.

— Sharp in 2006

In 2003, Sharp released a solo EP, followed by a self-titled solo album in 2004. He continued to tour in 2004–2005 with the band Goldenboy. On February 12, 2004, Cuomo sat in during a solo performance by Sharp at California State University, Fullerton. They played four songs together: the Sharp/Cuomo collaborations "Mrs. Young" and "Time Song", and the Weezer songs "Say It Ain't So" and "Undone". Sharp announced at the show that he and Cuomo had reunited and would be working on a record together. Later in 2004, Sharp announced on his website that although he and Cuomo had come up with "15 or 16 new song ideas", their "special brand of dysfunctionality" might keep them from finishing the project.

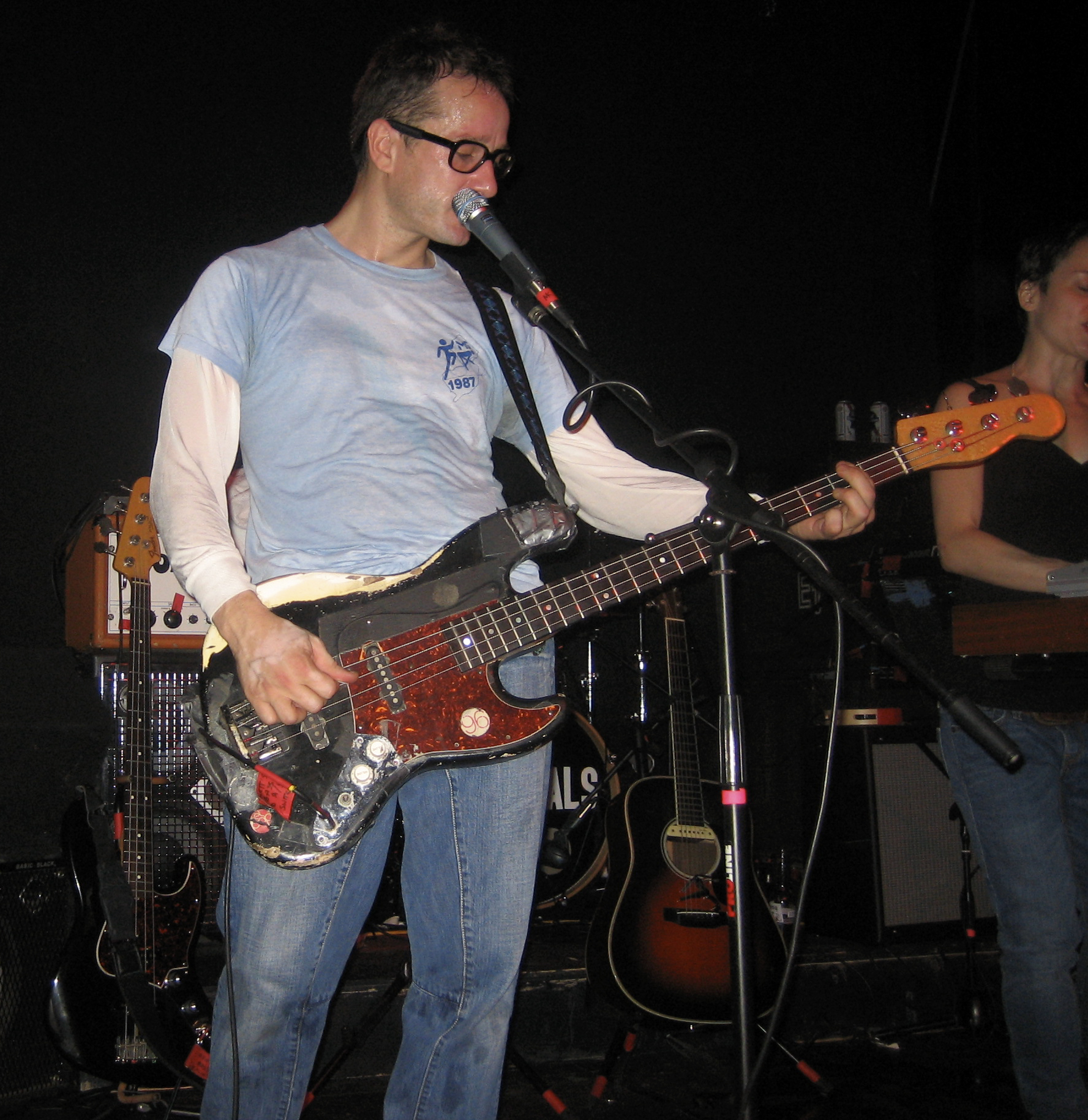
Sharp performing with the Rentals in 2007

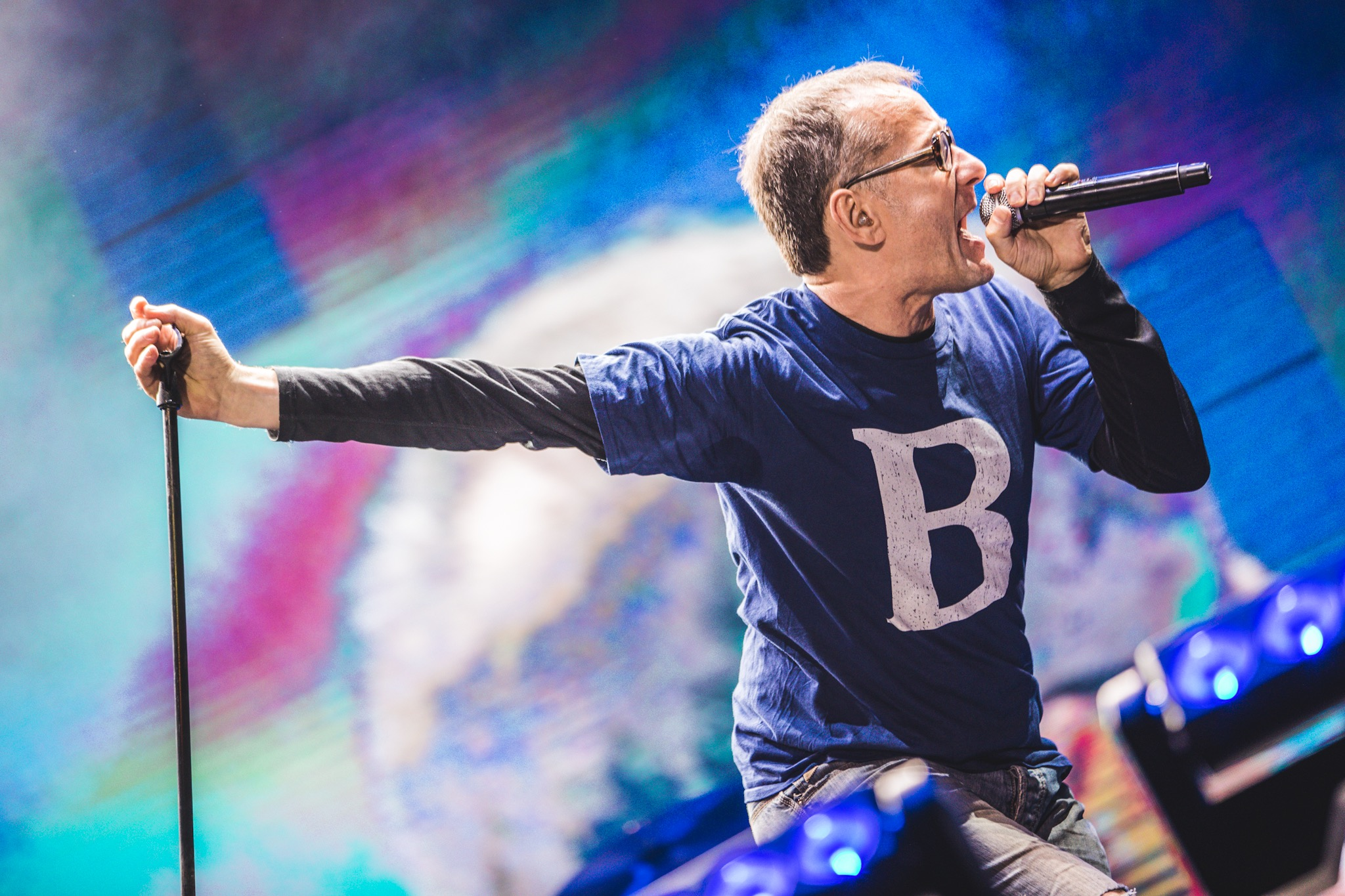
Sharp performing in Bilbao with Berri Txarrak in 2019

In March 2004, Sharp recorded synthesizer on So Jealous by Canadian indie pop band Tegan and Sara. After a slow period in 2005, Sharp contemplated what to do next, considering either a new solo album or starting a new collaborative partnership. The possibility of him rejoining Weezer was also an option; although this did not happen, in a 2006 interview, Sharp credited these conversations with Cuomo as giving him the idea to return to writing pop music, which eventually led him to re-form the Rentals. These ideas particularly strengthened after meeting Sara Radle. In 2005, six years after 1999's Seven More Minutes, the Rentals re-formed; the new lineup included original backup vocalist Rachel Haden, Sara Radle, Ben Pringle of Nerf Herder, Lauren Chipman, and Dan Joeright. Sharp and the Rentals toured North America in the summers of 2006 and 2007.

The Rentals released The Last Little Life EP on August 14, 2007. Between Rentals tours, Sharp returned to work in early 2007 with Tegan and Sara on their next album, The Con, later appearing at their concerts in 2008 to play bass in a cover of Weezer's "Tired of Sex".

After the three releases in the Songs About Time series in April, July, and October 2009, Sharp and the Rentals went on hiatus. In October 2010, Sharp sold most of his equipment from his Weezer and Rentals days on eBay. His Orange Matamp Lead 200 was purchased by Greg Veerman, bassist of Canadian rock band San Sebastian. In November 2010, Cuomo mentioned in an interview with Spin that "the idea came up" of having Sharp rejoin the band for their "Memories Tour", in which they play The Blue Album and Pinkerton. Cuomo said: "I think we left that idea behind pretty early on. I don't remember. I wasn't involved in the discussion so I don't know what the issues were."

In 2011, Sharp provided guest vocals on the song "FAQ" by Berri Txarrak, a Basque band whose live album Zertarako Amestu (2007) had significant influence on Songs About Time.

In 2014 The Rentals released Lost in Alphaville, followed by 2020's Q36 and 2022's The Rentals Present: The Midnight Society Soundtrack (A Matt Sharp / Nick Zinner Score).

In 2026, for Record Store Day, Sharp released a newly mixed and mastered version of Weezer's first studio session featuring the original band line-up. He had previously discovered the master tapes in February the same year and announced the album's release. The released is titled "1192", named after the timeframe it was recorded in, November 1992.

== Discography ==
=== Weezer ===
- 1994 – Weezer (The Blue Album)
- 1996 – Pinkerton

=== The Rentals ===
- 1995 – Return of the Rentals
- 1999 – Seven More Minutes
- 2007 – The Last Little Life EP
- 2009 – Songs About Time
- 2011 – Resilience: A Benefit Album for the Relief Effort in Japan
- 2014 – Lost in Alphaville
- 2020 – Q36
- 2022 – The Rentals Present: The Midnight Society Soundtrack (A Matt Sharp / Nick Zinner Score)

=== Solo ===
- 2003 – Puckett's Versus the Country Boy
- 2004 – Matt Sharp

=== With Homie ===
- 1998 – "American Girls" from the Meet the Deedles Soundtrack

=== With Tegan and Sara ===
- 2004 – So Jealous
- 2007 – The Con

=== With Berri Txarrak ===
- 2011 – "FAQ"

== Bibliography ==
- Luerssen, John D (2004), Rivers' Edge: The Weezer Story, ECW Press, ISBN 978-1550226195.
