= That Darn Punk (soundtrack) =

That Darn Punk Original Motion Picture Soundtrack

Soundtrack album by various artists
- Released: March 6, 2001
- Genre: Punk rock
- Length: 40:05
- Label: Kung Fu

Professional ratings
Review scores
Source	Rating
Allmusic	3/5 stars

That Darn Punk Original Motion Picture Soundtrack is a soundtrack album to the 2001 independent film That Darn Punk. The film was released by Kung Fu Films and starred Joe Escalante of the punk rock band The Vandals as the lead character. Escalante is also in charge of Kung Fu Films and Kung Fu Records, which put out the film's soundtrack. The label was co-founded by Escalante and Vandals guitarist Warren Fitzgerald, who also appears in the film. In fact, all the members of the Vandals appear in the film as the fictional band the Big Tippers, alongside several other punk rock personalities. The soundtrack album was released to coincide with the release of the film, which went straight to video on VHS and DVD formats.

Nearly all of the music in the film's soundtrack was supplied by punk rock bands, several of which were signed to Kung Fu Records at the time. The soundtrack includes several rare and unreleased songs from these bands which are not available on other releases. The Assorted Jelly Beans track was listed on the back sleeve as "Doodis," but on the inner sleeve as "Pic 'n' Save." Since "Pic 'n' Save" more closely resembles the song's lyrics, this has generally been accepted as the song's correct title. Interspersed throughout the soundtrack album are dialogue clips from the film.

== Track listing ==
1. Joey & Lenny - "Well That's Queer"*
2. Nerf Herder - "Siegfried & Roy"
3. Bigwig - "Still"
4. Johnny Puke - "Palookaville"*
5. Lagwagon - "After You My Friend"
6. The Vandals - "Right on Q"
7. Mr. Hollywoodpants - "Good vs. Great"*
8. Ozma - "Domino Effect"
9. Pennywise - "Alien"
10. Dirk Castigo - "It's Not Like That"*
11. The Ataris - "Ben Lee"
12. AFI - "Dream of Waking"
13. Doll Part Girl - "Sex With a Man"*
14. Antifreeze - "The Ides"
15. No Motiv - "Only You"
16. Daddy & Jailbait - "He Touched Me Daddy"*
17. MI6 - "Jabberjaw"
18. Officer Shithead - "My Property"*
19. Rancid - "GGF"
20. Assorted Jelly Beans - "Pic 'n' Save"
21. Pink Lady - "Bad Boyfriend"*
22. Sloppy Seconds - "Queen of Outer Space"
23. Swingin' Utters - "The Lonely"
24. The Drummer - "Funky See, Funky Do"*
25. Josh Freese - "Why Won't Left Eye Get With Me?"
26. Merla - "Potent Potables"*
27. The Vandals featuring Katalina - "My Heart Will Go On" (originally performed by Celine Dion)
28. The Vandals - Theme From That Darn Punk

*dialogue clip from film

== Album information ==
- Record label: Kung Fu Records
- Music Supervisor: Joe Escalante
- Art Director: Kris Martinez
- Cover concept: Mickey Stern
- Mastering by Greg Koller at Formula One Studios in La Habra, California
