= Pasadena (album) =

Studio album by Ozma
- Released: May 15, 2007
- Studios: LMRS, Los Angeles
- Genres: Indie pop, pop-punk
- Length: 36:51
- Labels: About A Girl Records, Reincarnate
- Producers: Ozma, Billy Burke, Greg Doyle

Ozma chronology
Spending Time on the Borderline (2003)	Pasadena (2007)	Boomtown (2014)

Professional ratings
Review scores
Source	Rating
AllMusic	4/5 stars
VC Reporter	B

Pasadena is the fourth studio album by American rock band Ozma, released in 2007.

== Production ==
The album took five months to record and was mixed by Matt Hyde.

== Critical reception ==
PopMatters wrote that the album is "more like Weezer's green self-titled album than anything, eager to live up to an ideal and doing a good job of it." The Los Angeles Times called the band "underrated," writing that the album is "more muscular and mature than the crunchy power-pop that gained Ozma a large Southland following over its first three albums." The Northern Express praised the "well-written, catchy indie compositions."

== Track listing ==
Credits adapted from CD liner notes.

No.	Title	Lyrics	Music	Length
1.	"No One Needs To Know" (new recording)	Daniel Brummel	Brummel	3:36
2.	"Barriers"	Ryen Slegr	Slegr & Greg Doyle	3:05
3.	"Eponine" (new recording)	Brummel	Brummel	3:18
4.	"Fight the Darkness"	Slegr & Kenn Shane	Slegr & Shane	2:59
5.	"Heartache vs Heartbreak"	Brummel & Star Wick	Brummel	3:33
6.	"Incarnation Blues"	Brummel	Brummel & Slegr	2:24
7.	"Lunchbreak (Cobras Theme)"	Slegr	Slegr	3:37
8.	"Motorology 3:39"	Brummel	Slegr & Brummel	4:11
9.	"I Wonder"	Brummel	Brummel	2:56
10.	"Underneath My Tree"	Slegr & Brummel	Slegr	3:15
11.	"Straight Flush"	Brummel	Brummel	3:56
Total length:				36:51

== Personnel ==
Ozma

- Star Wick – keys, voice
- Jose Galvez – guitar, voice
- Ryen Slegr – guitar, voice
- Daniel Brummel – bass, voice
- Kenn Shane – drums, voice

Additional musicians

- Will Noon – drums on "Heartache vs Heartbreak"
- Rachel Haden – vocals on "Heartache vs Heartbreak"
- Ben Pringle – trombone on "Lunchbreak (Cobras Theme)"
- Benjamin Chadwick – vocals on "Lunchbreak (Cobras Theme)"
- Matthew Caws – vocals on "Motorology 3:39"
- Eric Lea – viola on "I Wonder"

Technical personnel

- Ozma – production
- Billy Burke – production, recording, engineer
- Greg Doyle – production, mixing on "I Wonder"
- Matt Hyde – mixing (1 to 8, 10, 11)
- Mark Chalecki – mastering
