= The Salteens =

Canadian indie pop group

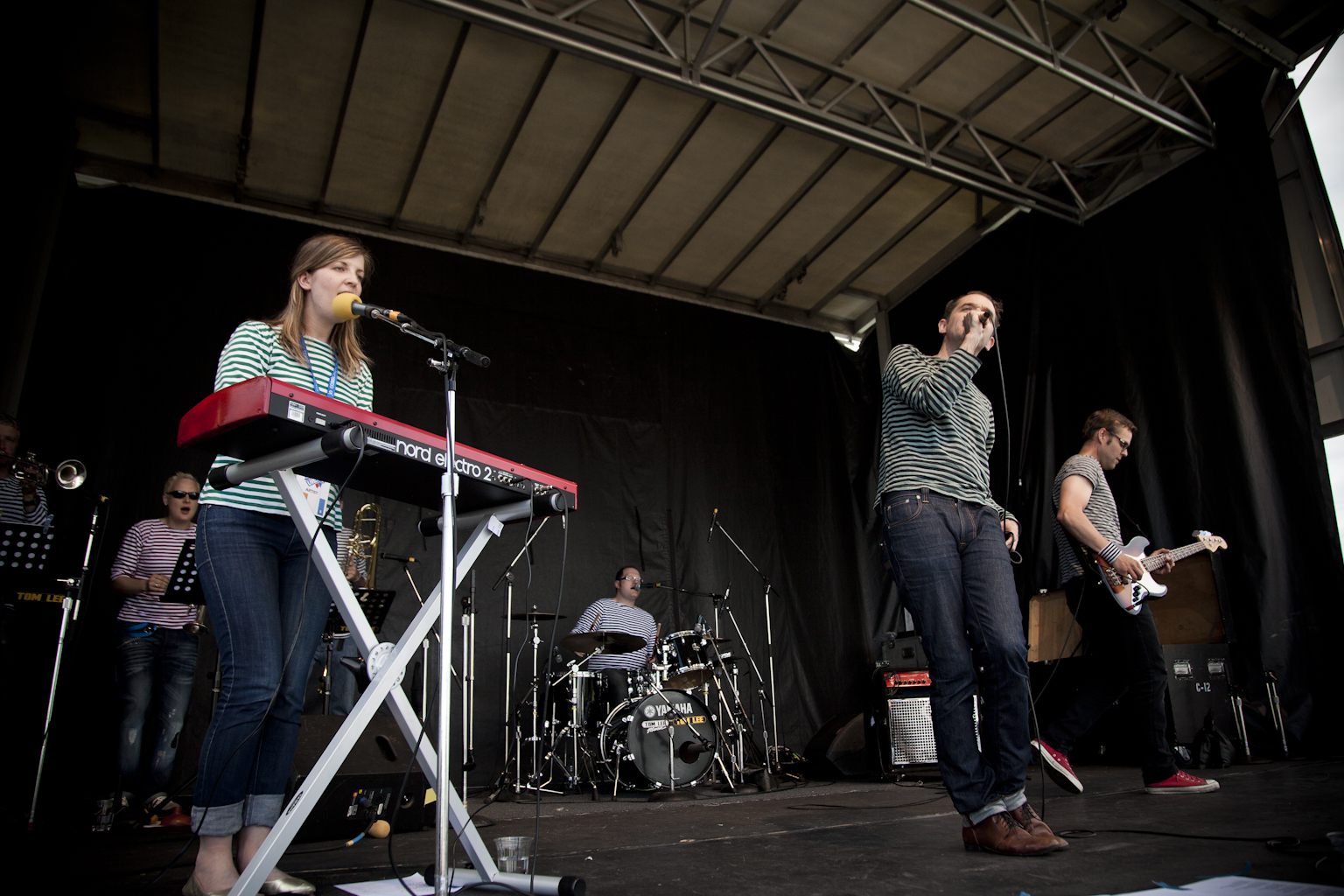
- The Salteens, July 2011

Background information
- Origin: Vancouver, British Columbia, Canada
- Genres: Indie pop, indie rock, twee pop
- Years active: 1997–present
- Labels: Boompa (Canada); Delta; Endearing; Lost & Lonesome (Australia); Drive-In Records (U.S.)
- Members: Scott L. D. Walker; Kevin Cooper; Dion Willis; Rob Calder; Carrie Tennant
- Past members: Erin Jane; Brent Follett; Megan Bradfield
- Website: salteens.com

The Salteens are a Canadian indie pop group based in Vancouver, British Columbia. The band released several albums of light pop music, toured in Canada and Australia; a number of their tracks were in rotation on CBC Radio.

== History ==
The Salteens formed in Vancouver in 1997. Their 2000 debut LP Short-Term Memories was released on Endearing Records. For the next two years the band performed in support of this release, earning a fan base in Canada, Australia, Japan and the United States. Short-Term Memories rose to the top of Canada's national college-radio chart, and was nominated in the category of Best Alternative Album at Canadian Music Week's 2001 Independent Music Awards.

The band's second release, Let Go of Your Bad Days was produced by Kevin Kane, with contributions from Ryan Dahle and Pete Bastard. It consisted of ten short tracks, and was released in 2003. The album was also released in Australia, supported by an opening berth on tour with Australian indie-pop bands The Lucksmiths and Jebediah.

Zellers, a Canadian discount department store, used the song "Nice Day" in its spring 2007 commercial. In addition, the band guest-starred and performed in 28 August 2007 episode of Yo Gabba Gabba! titled "Happy." The band wrote two songs for Yo Gabba Gabba!: "Be Nice to Animals" and "I'm So Happy I Can Dance".

In February 2008, the band released two songs for free download on their official website. The songs were "Hallowed Ways" and "Sunnyside St.". In March, they released an additional two tracks: "Don't Break My Heart" and "Everything They Know About Us".

On 11 May 2010, the band released a digital EP containing six songs entitled Moths. The songs are the product of a number of recording sessions that took place during 2007 and 2008 in Vancouver. That year The Salteens recorded the band's third full-length album, Grey Eyes, with producer Todd Simko. It was released in October though their own label, Boompa Records, and appeared on the !Earshot National Top 50 Chart.

== Discography ==
=== EPs ===
- Mighty Mighty (1999)
- Tomorrow / Motor Away (7" vinyl) (2000)
- Red Wagon (2001)
- Moths (2010)
- Kid Songs (2010)

=== Albums ===
==== Studio ====
- Short-Term Memories (2000)
- Let Go of Your Bad Days (2003)
- Grey Eyes (2010)

==== Live ====
- Red Wagon Australian tour 2001
