= Friends of P. =

Single by The Rentals

from the album Return of the Rentals
- B-side: "So Soon"
- Released: 1995
- Studio: Poop Alley Studios
- Genre: Power pop; alternative rock
- Length: 3:32
- Label: Maverick; Reprise
- Songwriter: Matt Sharp
- Producers: Tom Grimely; Matt Sharp

The Rentals singles chronology
"Friends of P." (1995)	"Waiting" (1996)

Music video
- "Friends of P." on YouTube

"Friends of P." is the debut single by American rock band The Rentals. It was first released in 1995 as the lead single for the band's debut studio album Return of the Rentals, released on October 31, 1995. It was the most successful song by the band, peaking at No. 7 on the US Modern Rock Tracks chart. The song was positively received by critics, noting the catchiness of the chorus and an overall very disconnected feel.

== Background ==
Following the song becoming an MTV success, many people had wondered who "P" was in the song. Finally, in 1998 Matt Sharp revealed who "P" was and the inspiration for the song, "That was one of the first songs I ever wrote, in the infancy of the Rentals", going on to say the song is about Paulina Porizkova, the wife of Ric Ocasek, who was the front man of American-new wave band The Cars and produced the debut album of Sharp's former band Weezer. Following this, Sharp would elaborate saying:

"I think at the time it came about because she had mentioned that the only people who would write songs for her were bad heavy-metal bands or something like that and all her friends were getting these songs written about them,"

In that same interview, Sharp would continue talking about how people questioned who "P" was in the song, with theories ranging from funny-celebrity themed guesses to more sad interpretations. Overall, Sharp reportedly expressed amazement with the wide range of guesses. The song would also be referenced on the Rentals song "Big Daddy C" when a voice in the song says "Who the hell is 'P'?".

Following Ocasek discovering that the song was about his wife he stated: "I found out later that the Rentals' Matt Sharp had written that song about my wife. I thought the song was OK, although I thought it was a bit silly. The truth was that Rivers Cuomo (of Weezer) and P were actually the ones that got along really well."

== Music video ==
The music video was filmed in Matt Sharp's temporary living quarters in one of the Park La Brea towers in Los Angeles, by one of Sharp's childhood friends Charles Hamilton on Rod Cervera's black-and-white 16mm WW2 camera on a budget of less than $500. On the day of the video's shooting Cherielynn Westrich had provided the band with coke bottle glasses and suits and dresses from a local thrift store. There were many problems during the shooting of the video. Violinist Petra Haden suffered from headaches throughout the video due to thick prescription glasses she wore in the video, only being able to get through the entire shoot by chewing gum while keeping her eyes looking off to the side. Following the completion of the principal photography, the band realized that without more current technology, the music and video would quickly fall out of sync. This resulted in the first couple of attempts at putting together the video being abandoned, being considered un-salvageable. That was until a film student named Jason Ruscio came in and edited the footage together while "keeping charm of the original concept intact."

Following the band being signed to Maverick Records, the video was re-edited to make it look more professional than the original video, but it was ultimately decided that the cut only diminished its original charm. A third cut of the video would be made after that keeping the same editing from the original video but adding English and Russian subtitles, this is the cut of the video that would play on MTV. A still from the music video was used for the cover of the album it was released on, Return of the Rentals.

== Track listing ==
CD & 7" LP release

1. "Friends of P." – 3:34
2. "So Soon (Outtake From the "For The Ladies" Sessions)" – 4:21

Promotional-only CD

1. "Friends of P." (Album Version) – 3:31
2. "Naive (Album Version)" – 2:20
3. "The Love I'm Searching For (Outtake From "For The Ladies" Sessions, Recorded At Poop Alley)" – 4:23
4. "Friends of P. [Recorded at Gramercy Park Hotel, Room 1020 On Matt's 4-Track]" – 3:24

== Personnel ==
The Rentals

- Matt Sharp – vocals, bass, additional Moog synthesizer, additional guitar
- Cherielynn Westrich – vocals
- Patrick Wilson – drums
- Petra Haden – viola, harmony vocals
- Rod Cervera – guitar
- Tom Grimley – Moog synthesizer, production

Production

- Stephen Marcussen – mastering

Artwork

- Guy Oseary – album artwork

== Charts ==
Chart performance for "Friends of P."
Chart (1995)	Peak position
US Billboard Hot 100	82
US Modern Rock Tracks (Billboard)	7
