= Q36 (album) =

Studio album by the Rentals
- Released: June 26, 2020
- Length: 68:11
- Label: Self-released
- Producer: Matt Sharp

The Rentals chronology
Lost in Alphaville (2014)	Q36 (2020)	The Midnight Society Soundtrack (2022)

Singles from Q36
- 1. "Spaceships" Released: November 5, 2019; 2. "Forgotten Astronaut" Released: November 18, 2019; 3. "9th Configuration" Released: December 3, 2019; 4. "Breaking and Breaking and Breaking" Released: December 17, 2019; 5. "Invasion Night" Released: December 31, 2019; 6. "Nowhere Girl" Released: January 14, 2020; 7. "Great Big Blue" Released: January 28, 2020; 8. "Above This Broken World" Released: February 19, 2020; 9. "Teen Beat Cosmonaut" Released: February 25, 2020; 10. "Another World" Released: March 10, 2020; 11. "Conspiracy" Released: April 14, 2020; 12. "Information (And the Island in the Sky)" Released: May 12, 2020; 13. "Machine Love" Released: May 26, 2020; 14. "Goodbye, Steve" Released: June 9, 2020; 15. "Shake Your Diamonds" Released: June 23, 2020

Professional ratings
Aggregate scores
Source	Rating
Metacritic	72/100
Review scores
Source	Rating
AllMusic	4/5 stars
Exclaim!	7/10
PopMatters	5/10
Under the Radar	8/10

Q36 is the fourth full-length studio album by the Rentals, it was self-released on June 26, 2020. It was made available on LP and on digital download. On January 7, 2020, Matt Sharp announced through social media that he would be remixing a collection of tracks from the album titled Z36. Stating that "The remixes have a more atmospheric approach that focus primarily on Nick Zinner’s guitars and my synthesizers."

== Background and recording ==
Matt Sharp announced that the band was working on their then-untitled studio album on October 4, 2017 just before the release of the single "Elon Musk is Making Me Sad", which would become the final track on Q36. Later in 2018, Sharp announced on Twitter that Dave Fridmann would be engineering the album, who had also engineered Weezer's 1996 studio album Pinkerton. Furthermore, on December 20, 2018, Sharp had stated that the mastering had been finished in Sterling Sound in Nashville, Tennessee.

In an interview with The Interplanetary Podcast, Sharp explained that he starting conceiving the album by starting with 50 song ideas. He said that his only rule going in to this album is that none of the songs could be autobiographical, explaining that he had gotten bored of songs about his personal experiences. In this podcast, Sharp also explained how he became associated with guitarist Nick Zinner at a new years party following his band The Yeah Yeah Yeahs performed a cover of The Rentals song "The Love I'm Searching For" in 2006. Years later, Sharp was able to convince him to work on a new Rentals album, which became Q36. Sharp and Zinner worked on the songs off the album independently in their own home studios.

Sharp enlisted Dave Fridmann to mix the album; the two worked on mixing between September and November 2018.

The album was formally revealed on November 5, 2019, alongside the lead-single "Spaceships", with pre-orders becoming available on the bands Bandcamp page. The second single, "Forgotten Astronaut" was released on November 20, 2019. Following that, there would be a new single every two weeks, alongside limited-merchandise and clothing designed by Ivan Minnsloff. On March 24, 2020, the record's physical release was postponed due to COVID-19.

== Track listing ==
Q36 track listing
No.	Title	Length
1.	"Shake Your Diamonds"	4:17
2.	"Nowhere Girl"	4:30
3.	"9th Configuration"	5:59
4.	"Teen Beat Cosmonaut"	3:15
5.	"Above This Broken World"	5:11
6.	"Forgotten Astronaut"	4:43
7.	"Conspiracy"	4:26
8.	"Breaking and Breaking and Breaking"	3:04
9.	"Great Big Blue"	3:25
10.	"Information (and the Island in the Sky)"	4:30
11.	"Spaceships"	4:18
12.	"Goodbye, Steve"	2:18
13.	"Invasion Night"	4:07
14.	"Another World"	3:20
15.	"Machine Love"	3:44
16.	"Elon Musk Is Making Me Sad"	6:56
Total length:		68:11

== Personnel ==
The Rentals

- Matt Sharp – vocals, production
- Nick Zinner – guitar
- Ronnie Vannucci – drums

Musicians

- The Gentle Assassins Choir – vocals
  - Jeffrey Adams (Track 16)
  - Ayo Awosika
  - Laura Burhenn
  - Alejandra Deheza
  - Arlene Deradoorian
  - Lizzy Ellison
  - Bridget Galanis
  - Zachary Galanis (Track 16)
  - Jose Galvez
  - Gotch (Track 12)
  - Ted Gowans (Track 16)
  - Jamie Jackson (Track 16)
  - Andrew James
  - Keith Murray
  - Colleen Police (Track 16)
  - Ryen Slegr
  - Shon Sullivan
  - Nedelle Torrisi (Track 16)
  - Sydney Wayser
  - Tim Wheeler
- The Section Quartet – strings
  - Eric Gorfain – violin
  - Daphne Chen – violin
  - Leah Katz – viola
  - Richard Dodd – cello

Technical

- Dave Fridmann – mixing engineer
- Adam Brook – engineer (choir)
- Robert Root – engineer (drums)
- Paul DuGre – engineer (strings)
- Ryan Smith – mastering
- Andrew Wilkinson – cover art
