= Reverie Sound Revue =

Canadian musical group

- Origin: Calgary, Alberta, Canada
- Genres: Indie rock
- Years active: 2002–2004; 2005–present
- Label: Boompa
- Members: Lisa Lobsinger; Patrick Walls; Marc De Pape; Bryce Gracey; John-Marcel de Waal

Reverie Sound Revue is a Canadian indie rock group formed in 2002 in Calgary. The group consists of Marc De Pape (guitar), John-Marcel de Waal (drums), Bryce Gracey (bass guitar), Lisa Lobsinger (vocals), and Patrick Walls (guitar). They are fronted by Lobsinger, who occasionally contributes to indie band Broken Social Scene. The group originally formed in Calgary, Alberta in 2002, disbanded in 2004, but later reformed in 2005. They have established a large fan base in Canada, but have had little success outside the country. Their albums have received mostly positive reviews from critics, although their songs have been criticized for not being memorable enough.

== History ==
Reverie Sound Revue formed in Calgary, Alberta, in 2002.

=== Reverie Sound Revue EP (2003–2004) ===
In 2003, Reverie Sound Revue self-released an eponymous extended play to critical acclaim, which gained fans in the local music scene. The EP also impressed indie rock performer Brendan Canning, which led to Lobsinger touring with his band Broken Social Scene. The EP sold over 2000 copies, solely through live shows and Megatunes, a Calgary music store. They toured Canada twice. They were included in the "Best of the Fest" line-up at Vancouver's New Music West festival in 2003. The group disbanded in 2004 due to band members leaving Calgary for other places in Canada.

=== Reverie Sound Revue (2005–present) ===
After a year, band member Marc De Pape became interested in reforming the group. He used e-mail to send instrumental tracks to the other band members, who were living in Vancouver, Calgary, Toronto and Montreal, for them to play and record the other instruments. On 23 June 2009, they released the album, entitled Reverie Sound Revue, on Boompa Records after being in development for a total of seven years. It received generally positive reviews from music critics. The band also re-released their debut EP, including a bonus track.

After releasing the album, they went on a "blog tour", with De Pape recording and releasing promotional live videos in which three of the band members played some of their songs online. He also made two music videos in order to promote the album. The band has no plans to go on any real tours. In 2010, band member Lisa Lobsinger explained that the band members enjoy making music together, but were too busy with other activities to do live shows together.

== Musical style ==
The band has jazz and "moody Britpop" as major influences for their albums, and has been called an "under-appreciated band of Canadian popsmiths". They also have the bands Ivy, Phoenix and Saint Etienne as minor influences for their music. Lisa Lobsinger provides vocals for their releases, usually whispering. Her voice is backed by clean guitar riffs, "delicate" melodies, simple drum loops and a wall of sound. The music also features a tight rhythm section and a large amount of reverb. Their EP had the band use "heavy pop leanings" and sound synthesizers for their music. For the studio album, they abandoned that style for "more moody" music, without synthesizers. The band's sound has been described as "ambient", "cool and collected".

== Members ==
The five members of Reverie Sound Revue are:

- Marc De Pape – guitar
- John-Marcel de Waal – drums, bass
- Bryce Gracey – bass guitar
- Lisa Lobsinger – vocals
- Patrick Walls – guitar

== Discography ==
Studio albums

Reverie Sound Revue (2009)

Extended plays

Reverie Sound Revue EP (2003)
