= Boomtown (Ozma album) =

Studio album by Ozma
- Released: February 11, 2014
- Recorded: Late 2013, Early 2014
- Genres: Alternative rock, indie rock
- Length: 37:33
- Label: None

Ozma chronology
Pasadena (2007)	Boomtown (2014)

Boomtown is the fifth studio album by American rock band Ozma, funded entirely by a Pledge Music campaign and released on February 11, 2014.

== Writing and Info ==
Boomtown was Ozma's first effort in seven years following 2007's Pasadena. It opens with "Around The World In 80 Seconds," Ozma's first instrumental since The Doubble Donkey Disc's "Korobeiniki." "Nervous" is notable as the first Ozma song written by drummer Kenn Shane, and the first lead vocal by keyboardist Star Wick. "Out The Window" is only the second Ozma song (the other being The Doubble Donkey Disc's "Immigration Song") to feature rhythm guitarist Jose Galvez on lead vocals.

== Track listing ==
No.	Title	Writer(s)	Length
1.	"Around the World in 80 Seconds"	Daniel Brummel	2:20
2.	"Nervous"	Kenn Shane	2:59
3.	"You'd Think I'd Know"	Ryen Slegr	3:12
4.	"Girlfriend You're the One"	Brummel	3:45
5.	"One Wish"	Slegr	3:22
6.	"Suicide Song"	Slegr	3:17
7.	"Tree Snake Son"	Brummel	4:02
8.	"Blue Love"	Slegr	1:55
9.	"Out the Window"	Jose Galvez	3:33
10.	"Boomtown"	Slegr	3:54
11.	"Never Know"	Slegr	5:14
Total length:			37:33
