= The Dudes =

Canadian indie rock band

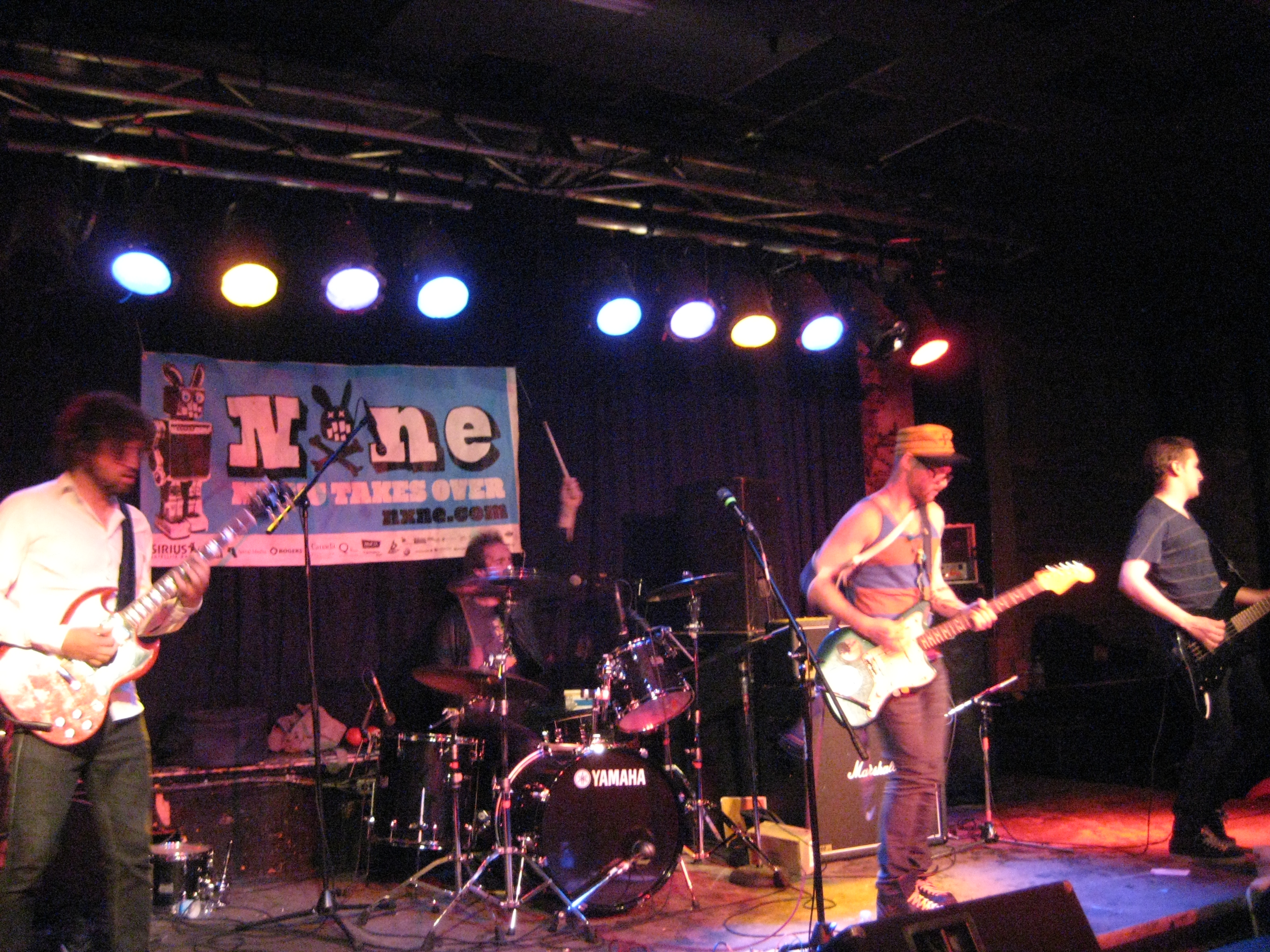
- The Dudes at the NXNE festival in Toronto, 2009

Background information
- Origin: Calgary, Alberta, Canada
- Genres: Indie rock
- Years active: 1996–2021
- Labels: LoadMusic
- Members: Dan Vacon; Matt Doherty
- Past members: Scott Ross; Brady Kirchner; Chris Vail; Pat Downing; Dan Mackinnon; Bob Quaschnick; Brock Geiger; Patrick Kelly
- Website: wearethedudes.com

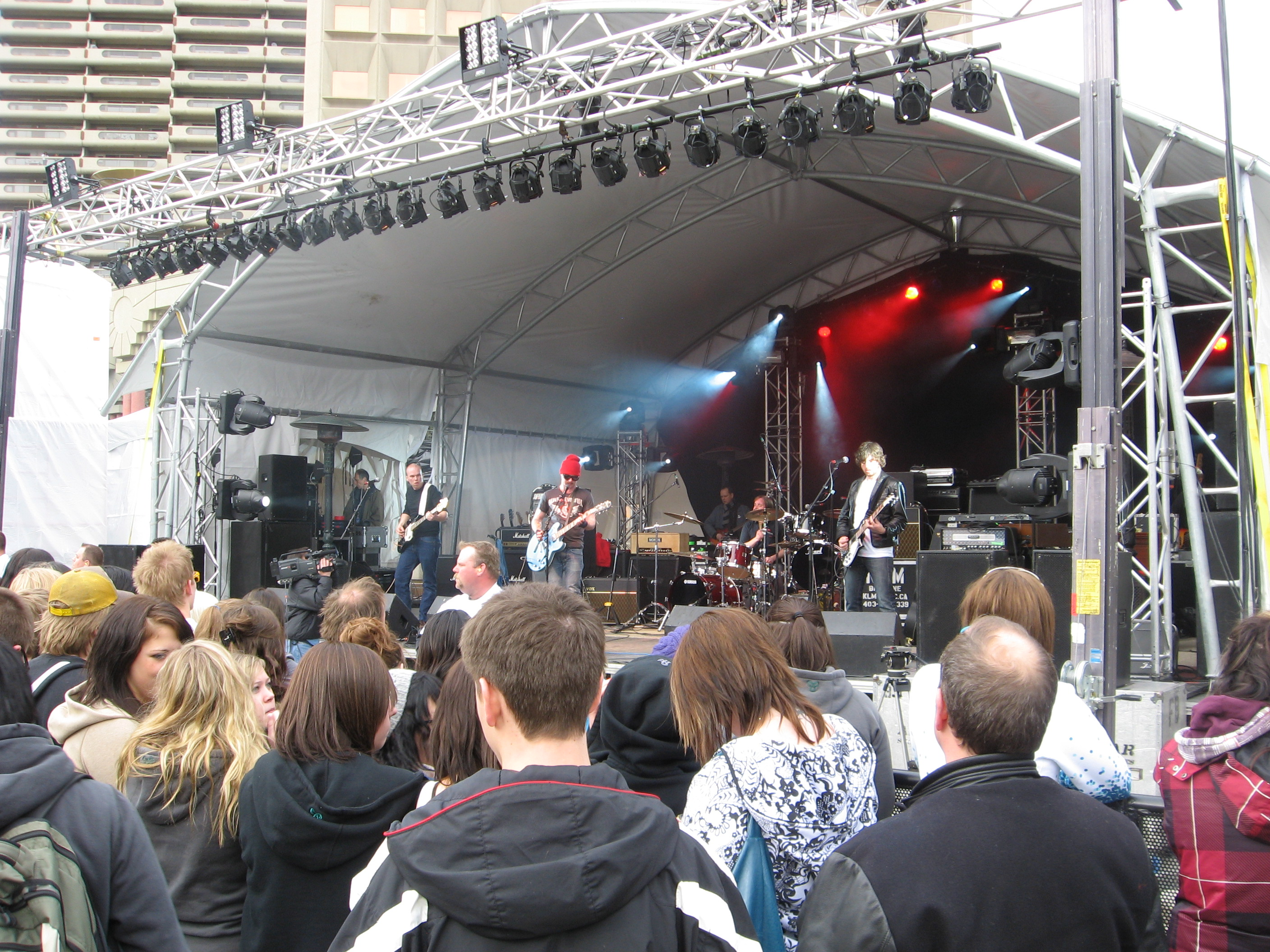
The Dudes

The Dudes were a Canadian indie rock band, formed in 1996 in Calgary, Alberta.

Critics have likened their musical style to Modest Mouse, although band members cite their influences as The Flaming Lips, The Descendents, Joel Plaskett, Thrush Hermit, and Weezer.

The Dudes gained popularity in Calgary both for their lo-fi approach to recording and releasing albums and for their live stage-show. On their album, Brain Heart Guitar, they worked with Calgary producer Russ Broom, and released the album in 2006 on the LoadMusic record label.

Their music has been played on major Canadian music stations, university radio and CBC Radio 3, and the group has played at North by Northeast, COCA, The Peak and Canadian Music Week. They have toured throughout Canada, Europe and the United States.

Their song "Dropkick Queen of the Weekend" was heard across Canada in 2006, having been featured in a Rogers Wireless advertising campaign.

On January 12, 2007, they released a single from Brain Heart Guitar, "Do the Right Thing". The music video was filmed at Webber Academy, a private school in Calgary, in the summer of 2006.

In June 2009, their album Blood Guts Bruises Cuts was released in Canada. Their single to be released in late 2009 is "The Girl Police" which featured in Season 1 of Rookie Blue. The bulk of the record Blood Guts Bruises Cuts was produced and recorded by Jeff Dawson and mixed by Mike Fraser.

Their single in 2012, "American Girl", was also produced by Jeff Dawson and Mixed by Mike Fraser.

2012 saw the release of a third album Barbers, Thieves, and Bartenders a title which comes from a lyric on a song from their previous album entitled "Small Mercies."

The band released their fourth album, East Side Good Times 5 in 2017.

Lead singer Danny Vacon attracted controversy during the COVID-19 lock-downs for a number of social media posts promoting anti-vaccination rhetoric. His responses to criticism of these posts were also controversial, making what some deemed to be misogynistic and homophobic comments. As a result of this controversy, the band entered an indefinite hiatus. Danny Vacon has continued to release music independently.

== Related bands ==
- Dojo Workhorse – Dan Vacon (Guitar), Matt Doherty (Drums), Bob Quashnick (Slide Guitar), Rob McIntyre (Bass), Brent Gough (Keys), Clea Anais (Cello), Brock Geiger (Guitar), [Chris Vail formerly on Guitar]
- RALEIGH (musical group) – Brock Geiger, Clea Anais, Matt Doherty, Will Maclellan
- The A-Team – Pat Downing, Andy Sparacino, Dan McKinnon
- The Pants Situation – Braden Funchner, Joey Mooney, Dan Laplante, Newman
- Sudden Infant Dance Syndrome – Braden Funchner, Craig Fahner, Sarah Ford, Jesse Locke

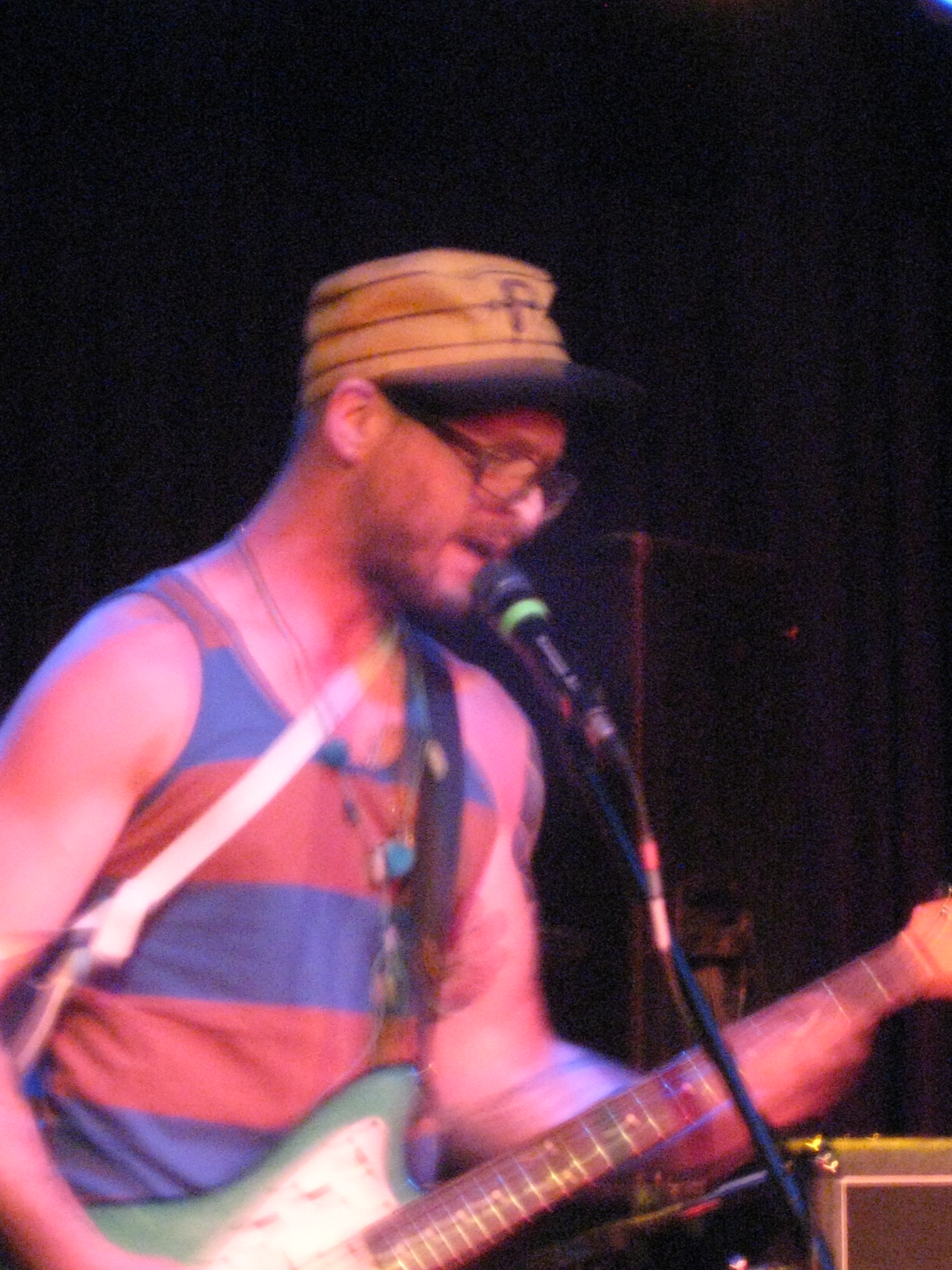
Frontman Dan Vacon

- HighKicks - Dan Vacon (Bass), Matt Doherty (Drums)

== Discography ==
- This Guy's the Limit (2002)
- Bee Puncher EP (2003)
- Brain. Heart. Guitar. (2006)
- Blood. Guts. Bruises. Cuts (2009)
- Barbers, Thieves and Bartenders (2012)
- East Side Good Times 5 (2017)

=== Singles ===
- "Dropkick Queen of the Weekend" (2006)
- "Do the Right Thing" (January 2007)
- "Fist" (January 2008)
- "Pretty Lies" (May 2009)
- "Mr. Someone Else" (2009)
- "Girl Police" (2009)
- "American Girl" (2012)
- "Saturday Night (My C is alright)" (2018)

== See also ==
- Music of Canada
- Canadian rock
- List of Canadian musicians
- List of bands from Canada
- Category:Canadian musical groups
