= Manisha =

Sanskrit term meaning intelligence and desire

Manisha (Sanskrit: मनीषा, romanized: Manīṣā) is a Sanskrit term meaning intelligence and desire.

== Usage ==
Manisha is used as a Hindu female name in India.

The Sanskrit term Manīṣā can be transliterated into English as Manisa or Manisha. The noun Manisha appears as early as the Rigveda Samhita and also in the Aitareya Upanishad, which is a part of the second book of Aitareya Aranyaka of Rigveda. And in the Rigveda Samhita, Manisha in most of the places is used to mean, ‘praise’.

However, both Adi Shankaracharya and Sayanacharya have stated that Manisha means "the independence of intellect (mati)’. Therefore, Manisha can be deciphered as "the intelligence which is capable of independent logical reasoning and rational analysis in determining truth or facts".

However, in Bengali, Manisha is reference given to goddess of wish.

While, according to Sanskrit-English dictionary, Manisha has several meanings, some of them are:

- Desire, wish; यो दुर्जनं वशयितुं तनुते मनीषाम् (yo durjanam vashayitum tanute manisham)
- Intelligence, wisdom, understanding; अतः साधोऽत्र यत् सारं मनुद्धृत्य मनीषया (atah sadhotra yat saaram manuddhartya manishya); प्रविभज्य पृथङ्मनीषया स्वगुणं यत्किल तत्करिष्यसि (pravibhajya prathamanishya svagunam yatkila tatkarishyasi)
- In Rigveda as hymn, praise, prayer.
- A thoughtfulness, reflection, idea, notion.
