= Ozma (band) =

American rock band

- Brummel, Slegr, Wick, Galvez, Shane

Background information
- Origin: Pasadena, California, United States
- Genres: Alternative rock, power pop, indie pop, pop-punk
- Years active: 1995–2004, 2006–2009, 2011–present
- Labels: Kung Fu, About a Girl
- Members: Ryen Slegr; Daniel Brummel; Jose Galvez; Star Wick; Kenn Shane
- Past members: Katherine Kieckhefer; Patrick Edwards

Ozma is an American rock band from Pasadena, California. The band's sound is a mix of nostalgic new wave–influenced power pop and contrapuntal Casiotone-driven melodies sustained by heavy guitar riffs. Since their formation in 1995, Ozma has released five studio albums and toured the U.S., Japan and Canada more than thirty times, including extensive touring with stylistically similar groups including Weezer, Nada Surf, Rilo Kiley, Superdrag, The Rentals, The Get Up Kids, Piebald, Saves The Day, Asian Kung-Fu Generation, and Rooney.

== History ==
=== Early years (1995–2001) ===
Ozma was formed in September 1995 by Ryen Slegr (vocals/guitar), Jose Galvez (guitar/vocals), Patrick Edwards (drums) and Daniel Brummel (vocals/bass), Galvez introduced Brummel to the others, whom he met on AOL while Brummel was looking for a band to join. In 1996, the still-unnamed band were joined by Katherine Kieckhefer on keyboards, before deciding on the name "Ozma" (taken from the L. Frank Baum books on the drummer's mother's bookshelf) in 1997, and in 1998 were joined by competent keyboardist Star Wick, who replaced the departing Kieckhefer. After their early 4-track cassette demos Cuatro and Ocho were well received by friends, they released Songs of Inaudible Trucks and Cars in early 1999, a collection of demos and live tracks, released on home-made CD-Rs and later republished on MP3.com as Songs of Audible Trucks and Cars (due to a character restriction). They then self-released what is considered their first "proper" studio album, Rock and Roll Part Three, on January 1, 2000. This consisted of "a few thousand" (estimated by Brummel) CDs manufactured by their own label, Tornado Recordings. During these early years, Ozma "played almost anywhere in the California state area," garnering a strong regional following.

Ozma's first real break came in 2001, when they were selected to tour with Weezer. In preparation for the "Yahoo! Outloud Tour," Weezer asked their fans to vote for an opening act via their web site, and the bands who received the most votes were Ozma and The Get Up Kids. One year later, Weezer invited Ozma to tour with them again on 2002's "Hyper Extended Midget Tour", which also featured Saves the Day.

The band self-released their second album The Doubble Donkey Disc on February 21, 2002 (later reissued on Kung Fu Records on June 25, 2002). With this release, Ozma experimented with the traditional Russian balalaika and the flute to create a sound they called "Russian coldfusion." The disc was split into two imaginary concept EPs: the first five songs (including the Russian folk song "Korobeiniki", more famously the Tetris theme) revolved around Russian themes, while the second half created a more danceable atmosphere.

=== Kung Fu years (2001–2004) ===
Later in 2001, partly as a result of the exposure gained from touring with Weezer, Ozma signed with Kung Fu Records, which led to a mainstage appearance on the 2002 Warped Tour. Over the next two years, Kung Fu put out remastered and enhanced versions of Rock and Roll Part Three and The Doubble Donkey Disc, before Ozma's third album, Spending Time On The Borderline, was released in May 6, 2003. This record saw Ozma mature their sound and expand their musical outlook, moving away—at times significantly—from the keyboard-driven, often video game–themed rock of the earlier albums. During the 2001–2004 period, Ozma toured the US numerous times, with bands such as Nada Surf, Superdrag, Piebald, The Format, and Rilo Kiley.

On July 23, 2004, Ozma announced that they had disbanded, citing deteriorating relationships between band members. Daniel Brummel moved to New York City to pursue a more folk-heavy style and released his debut solo album Speak Easy independently on September 27, 2005. Also during this interim period, Ryen Slegr and Jose Galvez formed Yes Dear with ex-members of Arlo and Teen Heroes. On January 9, 2006, Ozma announced that the band had reunited—without Edwards—to play new shows, new songs, and put out new records. During July and August 2006 the band joined The Rentals for the "Return Tour," with Slegr (now an official member of The Rentals) performing in both bands. During the tour, Ozma rotated many new songs through their setlist. In September, the band announced that they would be touring the nation again in October with the band Hellogoodbye.

=== Pasadena (2006–2009) ===
On May 15, 2007, the band released their fourth studio album, Pasadena (after their hometown of Pasadena, CA), through About a Girl Records. The album included guest appearances by Matthew Caws (Nada Surf), Will Noon (Straylight Run, Fun), Rachel Haden (The Rentals, that dog.), Ben Pringle (The Rentals, Nerf Herder), and Eric Summer (Get Set Go). Allmusic referred to Pasadena as "the strongest work of their careers," rating it 4.5 out of 5 stars.

=== Boomtown (2011–present) ===
In 2012, Ozma performed on the inaugural Weezer Cruise, alongside Dinosaur Jr. and Sebadoh. Then, in late 2013, Ozma held PledgeMusic campaign to fund their unnamed fifth album. Their goal was exceeded, and Boomtown was released digitally on February 11, 2014. Immediately following the digital release, Ozma joined Weezer, Cat Power, The Orwells, DIIV, and Adam Devine on the second Weezer Cruise, being the only band aside from Weezer to perform on both cruises.

== Popular culture ==
Ozma's cover of the Russian folk song "Korobeiniki" was featured in Kick-Ass 2.

A person in the crowd in the film Napoleon Dynamite can be seen wearing an Ozma t-shirt.

The song "Rocks" was heard in the Nickelodeon teen sitcom iCarly, in the 2008 episode "iMight Switch Schools".

== Discography ==
=== Demo tapes and rare albums ===
- Cuatro (1996, reissued 2021)
- Ocho (1997, reissued 2021)
- First Strike EP (1997/1998)
- Songs of Inaudible Trucks and Cars (1998, reissued 1999 and 2020)

=== Studio albums ===
- Rock and Roll Part Three (2000, reissued 2001/2026)
- The Doubble Donkey Disc (2001, reissued 2002)
- Spending Time on the Borderline (2003)
- Pasadena (2007)
- Boomtown (2014)

=== Live albums ===
- Ozma - Live Acoustic Set - July 12, 2000 (2021)
- Ozma - Live on KUCI - January 24, 2001 (2021)

=== Remix albums ===
- GR8ISTBITS VOL. 1 (2022)

=== Singles ===
Year	Title	Notes
1998	"Lorraine" b/w "Los Angeles"	Self-released cassette single of Ozma's earliest professional recordings. Notably produced by Rod Cervera.
2001	"Domino Effect" b/w "Apple Trees"	Named Songs From Rock and Roll Part Three. Included a promotional radio edit of "Domino Effect" released by Kung Fu Records. Several hundred self-released CDs were given out at live shows.
2002	"Korobeiniki" b/w "The Business of Getting Down"	UK 7" single. Only 1,000 copies produced, by small UK label Falsetto Records who procured the rights for a one-off release.
2007	"Eponine" b/w "No One Needs To Know"	Promotional radio-only single released by About A Girl Records, never commercially available.
2014	"Nervous"	Boomtown single for Pledge Music donators.
