= Return of the Rentals =

Studio album by The Rentals
- Released: October 31, 1995
- Studio: Poop Alley Studios
- Length: 36:55
- Labels: Maverick; Reprise
- Producers: Tom Grimley; Matt Sharp

The Rentals chronology
Return of the Rentals (1995)	Seven More Minutes (1999)

Singles from Return of the Rentals
- 1. "Friends of P." Released: November 21, 1995; 2. "Waiting" Released: 1996

Return of the Rentals is the debut studio album by American alternative rock band The Rentals, released on October 31, 1995, through Maverick Records and Reprise Records. The album features Matt Sharp—Weezer's bassist at the time—on vocals and bass, as well as Weezer drummer Patrick Wilson.

Return of the Rentals was well received by critics and produced the successful single "Friends of P.", which peaked at number 7 on Billboard's Modern Rock Tracks chart and received significant airplay on MTV's 120 Minutes. Despite this, the album only managed to reach number 19 on the Billboard Heatseeker Albums chart, and by 1999 the album had sold 96,000 copies in the United States, according to Nielsen SoundScan.

In a 2019 Reddit AMA, Matt Sharp revealed that the artwork and the master tapes of Return of the Rentals have either been lost or destroyed by the record label, meaning a reissue of the album is unlikely.

== Background ==
The "P" in the track "Friends of P." has had multiple theories presented as to its meaning. The actual "P" in the song refers to Paulina Porizkova, the wife of The Cars guitarist Ric Ocasek, who produced the first Weezer album, known as The Blue Album. Porizkova made a claim that no one had ever written a song about her, and so Sharp took on the task. Ocasek noted that he found the subject matter of the song a bit odd. Fictitious theories suggest that "P" refers to the Psychic Friends Network or Patrick Wilson, who played drums for both The Rentals and Weezer.

"Please Let That Be You" was originally written by Sharp and Rivers Cuomo as a song called "Mrs. Young", a spiritual counterpart to Weezer's song "Jamie". On one demo, Cuomo helps Sharp, doing extra instrumentation and backup vocals. At one point, Weezer considered recording both "Jamie" with "Mrs. Young" (later written as "Please Let That Be You" without Cuomo but instead with Rachel Haden) as its B-side for a single, but this never happened.

== Reception ==
Professional ratings
Review scores
Source	Rating
AllMusic	4/5 stars
Entertainment Weekly	B
NME	7/10
Pitchfork	8.0/10
Q	3/5 stars

Return of the Rentals received generally favorable reviews from critics. Entertainment Weekly claimed, "Its winsome love songs make for good, clean, disposable fun." Q compared the Rentals' work to the early work of the Cars: "The Rentals root themselves in the sound of late-’70s US new wave; the result is in many senses reminiscent of The Cars' earlier material." NME wrote that "despite its pretensions to [be] meaningless electro-pop, it can't help but have depth". Pitchfork's Ryan Schreiber enjoyed the band's attempt to bring back Moog synthesizers.

In a retrospective review, Peter D'Angelo of AllMusic praised the album, saying, "Return of the Rentals is a real benchmark of carefree pop from the '90s, and shouldn't be forgotten anytime soon."

== Legacy ==
"Waiting" appeared in the 1997 horror anthology film Campfire Tales. The song plays in a character's bedroom during the film's third segment, titled "People Can Lick Too".

In 2006, the Yeah Yeah Yeahs covered "The Love I'm Searching For" on AOL's The Interface podcast. In 2008, Ash covered "Please Let That Be You" for the album Friends of P. -- Tribute to The Rentals. "Friends of P." was covered by Tokyo Police Club on their album Elephant Shell Remixes and sampled by Girl Talk on his 2006 album Night Ripper.

Tera Melos guitarist Nick Reinhart uploaded a cover of the track "These Days" to SoundCloud.

== Track listing ==
All tracks are written by Matt Sharp, except "My Summer Girl", written with Cherielynn Westrich.

No.	Title	Length
1.	"The Love I'm Searching For"	3:36
2.	"Waiting"	3:13
3.	"Friends of P."	3:32
4.	"Move On"	4:21
5.	"Please Let That Be You"	3:34
6.	"My Summer Girl"	3:13
7.	"Brilliant Boy"	4:16
8.	"Naive"	2:20
9.	"These Days"	3:00
10.	"Sweetness and Tenderness"	4:22

== Personnel ==
The Rentals

- Matt Sharp – vocals, bass, Moog
- Cherielynn Westrich – Moog, vocals
- Patrick Wilson – drums
- Petra Haden – violin, vocals
- Rod Cervera – guitar
- Tom Grimley – Moog

Additional personnel

- Jim Richards – additional keyboards on "Please Let That Be You"
- Rachel Haden – vocals on "Move On"

Production

- Matt Sharp – production, mixing
- Tom Grimley – production, recording, mixing
- Stephen Marcussen – mastering

Artwork

- Guy Oseary – album artwork
