= Sara Radle =

Sara I. Radle is an American filmmaker/musician and former member of the band The Rentals. Radle was a member of the Rentals for three years, starting in 2005.

Radle’s music career began in San Antonio, Texas, fronting the punk/pop band Lucy Loves Schroeder, at the age of 17. After a self-released LP and a 7-inch single on Grade Nine Records, LLS signed to Chicago’s Beatville Records and released another LP and EP. The band toured heavily. In 2003, Lucy Loves Schroeder disbanded.

In December 2000, Radle's Jellybeans With Belly Buttons, under the name Fred Savage Fanclub on Denton-based She’s Gone Records, was released. In December 2002, Radle began working on her next solo record with the pAper chAse’s John Congleton. The record, You Can’t Make Everybody Like You, was the first release from Sara’s own Dallas-based Jeez Louise Records in January 2004. She released a five-song EP, People You’ve Been Before, on Jeez Louise Records in March 2004.

In June 2005, Radle to Los Angeles, California, to join The Rentals. In July 2008, The Rentals announced her departure via their MySpace blog. Radle went on to form Los Angeles–based band, Calamity Magnet. Calamity Magnet released a self-titled 5-song EP in 2008.

In 2009, Radle joined Los Angeles, California based indie pop group Walking Sleep (formerly The Flying Tourbillon Orchestra). She played with the band until their break-up in 2011, appearing on the full-length albums Measures and Tarp Sessions.

In September 2010, Radle released her fourth solo record, entitled Four. Her fifth solo album, Same Sun Shines, marked the first time she engineered and mixed her own album in addition to playing all of the instruments. In September 2014, Radle wrote and directed a short film, "First Shift Back", which screened at the Women's Independent Music Festival in November 2014.
