= Songs About Time =

2009 EP series, with 52 short films and 365 photographs by the Rentals

EP series, with 52 short films and 365 photographs by The Rentals
- Released: April 7, 2009; July 7, 2009; October 20, 2009
- Recorded: 2008, 2009
- Genre: Alternative rock, power pop
- Length: 121:19
- Label: Self-released
- Producer: Matt Sharp

The Rentals chronology
The Last Little Life EP (2007)	Songs About Time (2009)	Lost in Alphaville (2014)

Professional ratings
Review scores
Source	Rating
Punknews.org	3/5 stars

Songs About Time is a multimedia project released by The Rentals throughout 2009. It consists of Songs About Time, three mini-albums released every three months; Films About Weeks, 52 black and white short films scored and arranged by The Rentals and released every Tuesday; and Photographs About Days, 365 photographs released daily. The first of the mini albums, Chapter One, was released April 7, 2009; Chapter Two was released July 7, 2009 and Chapter Three was released on October 20, 2009. All three chapters were released digitally via therentals.com. The first chapter, entitled The Story of a Thousand Seasons Past, was recorded during late 2008 and early 2009. It features guest playing from Joey Santiago (of The Pixies).

== Track listing ==
Chapter One: The Story of a Thousand Seasons Past
No.	Title	Length
1.	"Song of Remembering"	3:53
2.	"Story of a Thousands Seasons Past"	3:13
3.	"All I Have"	3:00
4.	"Seven Years"	3:02
5.	"Thought of Sound"	3:49
6.	"Fall Into the Eve"	2:42
7.	"Colorado"	3:25
8.	"A Thousand Season Past (Spanish Version)"	3:10
Total length:		29:37

Chapter Two: It's Time to Come Home
No.	Title	Length
9.	"It's Time to Come Home"	3:17
10.	"No Desire #2"	3:32
11.	"Girls of the Metro"	5:09
12.	"Late Night Confessions"	3:21
13.	"One Last Prayer"	4:12
14.	"A Otra Cosa Mariposa"	4:10
15.	"Damaris"	4:25
16.	"Late Night Confessions (French Version)"	3:19
Total length:		55:42

Chapter Three: The Future
No.	Title	Length
17.	"A Rose is a Rose"	3:19
18.	"Irrational Things"	3:53
19.	"Traces of Our Tears"	3:19
20.	"The Future"	4:41
21.	"Stardust"	2:48
22.	"Borrow Each Other"	3:16
23.	"Honey Life"	3:18
24.	"A Rose is a Rose (Japanese Version)"	3:16
Total length:		82:12

=== Chapter Four: Tokyo Blues ===
Chapter Four: Tokyo Blues
No.	Title	Length
25.	"October Thirteen"	1:43
26.	"February Twenty Four"	1:26
27.	"March Ten (Part Two)"	1:28
28.	"November Twenty Four"	1:26
29.	"September Eight"	2:03
30.	"December One"	2:45
31.	"November Ten"	1:33
32.	"June Two"	1:21
33.	"February Ten"	2:46
34.	"January Twenty"	2:38
35.	"March Ten (Part One)"	0:53
36.	"March Three"	2:26
37.	"December Thirty One"	2:37
38.	"July Twenty Eight"	1:16
39.	"July Twenty One"	1:18
40.	"May Twelve"	2:08
41.	"February Three"	2:29
42.	"October Twenty Seven"	1:51
Total length:		121:19

== Resilience: A Benefit Album for the Relief Effort in Japan ==
Resilience: A Benefit Album for the Relief Effort in Japan
Review scores
Source	Rating
AllMusic	2/5 stars

In 2011, Tokyo Blues, the fourth album from Songs About Time, was re-released as Resilience: A Benefit Album for the Relief Effort in Japan as a fundraising effort for the 2011 Japanese disasters.
