= The Doubble Donkey Disc =

Studio album by Ozma
- Released: February 22, 2001
- Genres: Indie pop, pop-punk
- Length: 40:12
- Labels: Tornado Recordings, Kung Fu Records

Ozma chronology
Rock and Roll Part Three (2000)	The Doubble Donkey Disc (2001)	Spending Time on the Borderline (2003)

Professional ratings
Review scores
Source	Rating
AllMusic	link

The Doubble Donkey Disc is the second studio album by American rock band Ozma. Originally self-released in 2001, it was rereleased by Kung Fu Records in 2002. The album is composed of two EP concepts; the Russian Coldfusion EP (tracks 1–5) and the Bootytraps EP (tracks 6–10).

== Track listing ==
All tracks are written by Ozma, except Korobeiniki, a traditional Russian folk song commonly known as the theme from the video game Tetris.

No.	Title	Writer(s)	Length
1.	"Flight of Yuri Gagarin"	Brummel, Galvez, Slegr	2:24
2.	"No One Needs to Know"	Brummel	4:06
3.	"Korobeiniki (Traditional Russian Folk Song)"		2:18
4.	"You Know the Story"	Brummel, Galvez, Slegr	3:20
5.	"Landing of Yuri Gagarin"	Brummel, Galvez, Slegr	3:04
6.	"The Business of Getting Down (Flight of the Bootymaestro)"	Brummel	4:56
7.	"Maybe in an Alternate Dimension (Flight of the Bootymetronome)"	Slegr	4:50
8.	"Immigration Song (Flight of the Bootymechanic)"	Galvez	4:59
9.	"Flight of the Bootymaster (Flight of the Bootymaster)"	Slegr	4:18
10.	"Continental Drift (Flight of the Bootymademoiselle)"	Brummel	5:57
Total length:			40:12

== Personnel ==
- Daniel Brummel – vocals, bass, balalaika
- Pat Edwards – drums
- Jose Galvez – guitar, vocals
- Ryen Slegr – vocals, guitar, balalaika
- Star Wick – keys, flute
