= Seven More Minutes =

1999 studio album by The Rentals

Studio album by The Rentals
- Released: April 13, 1999
- Recorded: 1996–1998
- Studio: Matrix Studios (London) Drive By Studios (Los Angeles)
- Genre: Alternative rock; power pop
- Length: 58:17
- Label: Maverick
- Producer: Matt Sharp

The Rentals chronology
Return of the Rentals (1995)	Seven More Minutes (1999)	The Last Little Life EP (2007)

Singles from Seven More Minutes
- 1. "Getting By" Released: March 23, 1999

Professional ratings
Review scores
Source	Rating
AllMusic	3/5 stars
Entertainment Weekly	B+
Hot Press	9/12
NME	6/10
Pitchfork Media	5.9/10
Popmatters	7/10 discs
Rolling Stone	3/5 stars

Seven More Minutes is the second studio album by American rock band The Rentals. It was released on April 13, 1999, and reached number 23 on Billboard's Heatseekers Album chart.

== Background and production ==
Beginning in 1995—the same year that Return of the Rentals was released—The Rentals' frontman, Matt Sharp, began to spend a considerable amount of time in Spain, particularly Barcelona. While there, he began to record lyrics and melodies for songs that would appear on this album on a tape recorder while at nightclubs and parties. For "My Head Is in the Sun", Sharp cowrote the song with Rivers Cuomo, whom he had previously worked with while on the band Weezer. Songs were recorded in Barcelona and London. The album featured contributions from artists from other bands, which, in addition to Cuomo, included Damon Albarn of Blur, Miki Berenyi of Lush, Petra Haden of That Dog, Donna Matthews of Elastica, and Tim Wheeler of Ash. While mixing the album, Sharp lived in Cuomo's apartment in Boston.

Sharp said that a goal of his with Seven More Minutes was to make the album more universally accessible than its predecessor, which he said had been "on the geeky side of things". While he said that both of the albums were personal reflections of his life at the time that he was writing them, this new album was more grand in scale. Concerning the use of synthesizers, which were featured heavily in both albums, Sharp said that he had wanted to utilize them in a less "new wave" style with Seven More Minutes.

== Release and promotion ==
The album was released on April 13, 1999. "Getting By" was released to rock radio stations several weeks earlier, on March 23. Maverick, the record label, said that they would be utilizing mailing lists for fans of The Rentals, Weezer, and bands whose members were featured in the album in order to promote the album. Additionally, they would be distributing cassette samplers of some of the songs at concerts for bands that they believed would have a similar fanbase for The Rentals. Prior to the album's release, Sharp said that he planned to do a concert tour to promote the album. Sharp said that, while his commitment to Weezer had limited his ability to promote Return of the Rentals, he would be more active in this album's promotion.

== Critical reception ==
David Daley of CMJ New Music Monthly gave the album a positive review, calling it "more cohesive and daring than their debut, but with just as much kitschy new wave fun". Miles Raymer of Entertainment Weekly also spoke positively of the album, saying it was "almost shockingly raw and honest".

== Track listing ==
All tracks are written by Matt Sharp, except where noted.

No.	Title	Writer(s)	Length
1.	"Getting By"		2:52
2.	"Hello, Hello"		4.17
3.	"She Says It's Alright"		3:59
4.	"The Cruise"		4:04
5.	"Barcelona"		4:04
6.	"Say Goodbye Forever"		3:56
7.	"Overlee"		5:31
8.	"Big Daddy C."		3:20
9.	"Keep Sleeping"		3:43
10.	"The Man with Two Brains"		4:39
11.	"Must Be Wrong"		4:30
12.	"Insomnia"		1:56
13.	"It's Alright (Reprise)"		1:09
14.	"My Head Is in the Sun"	Matt Sharp; Rivers Cuomo	4:41
15.	"Jumping Around"		5:36
Total length:			58:17

Japanese Bonus Track
No.	Title	Length
16.	"The Great Bank Robbery"	6:39
Total length:		64:56

== Personnel ==
- Matt Sharp - vocals
- Rod Cervera - electric and acoustic guitars
- Jim Richards - Moog and ARP synthesizers; piano on "She Says It's Alright" and "My Head Is in the Sun"; trombone on "She Says It's Alright"
- Kevin March - drums

=== Additional musicians ===
- Damon Albarn - vocals on "Big Daddy C."
- Petra Haden - vocals on various tracks.
- Miki Berenyi - vocals on "The Cruise"
- Donna Matthews - vocals on "Must Be Wrong" and "Say Goodbye Forever"
- Maya Rudolph - vocals on "Barcelona" and "My Head Is in the Sun"
- Tim Wheeler - guitars on "Overlee" and "Hello, Hello"
- Danny Frankel - percussion on "Hello, Hello"
- Sharon McConochie - main vocals on "The Man with Two Brains"
