= The Rentals =

American musical group

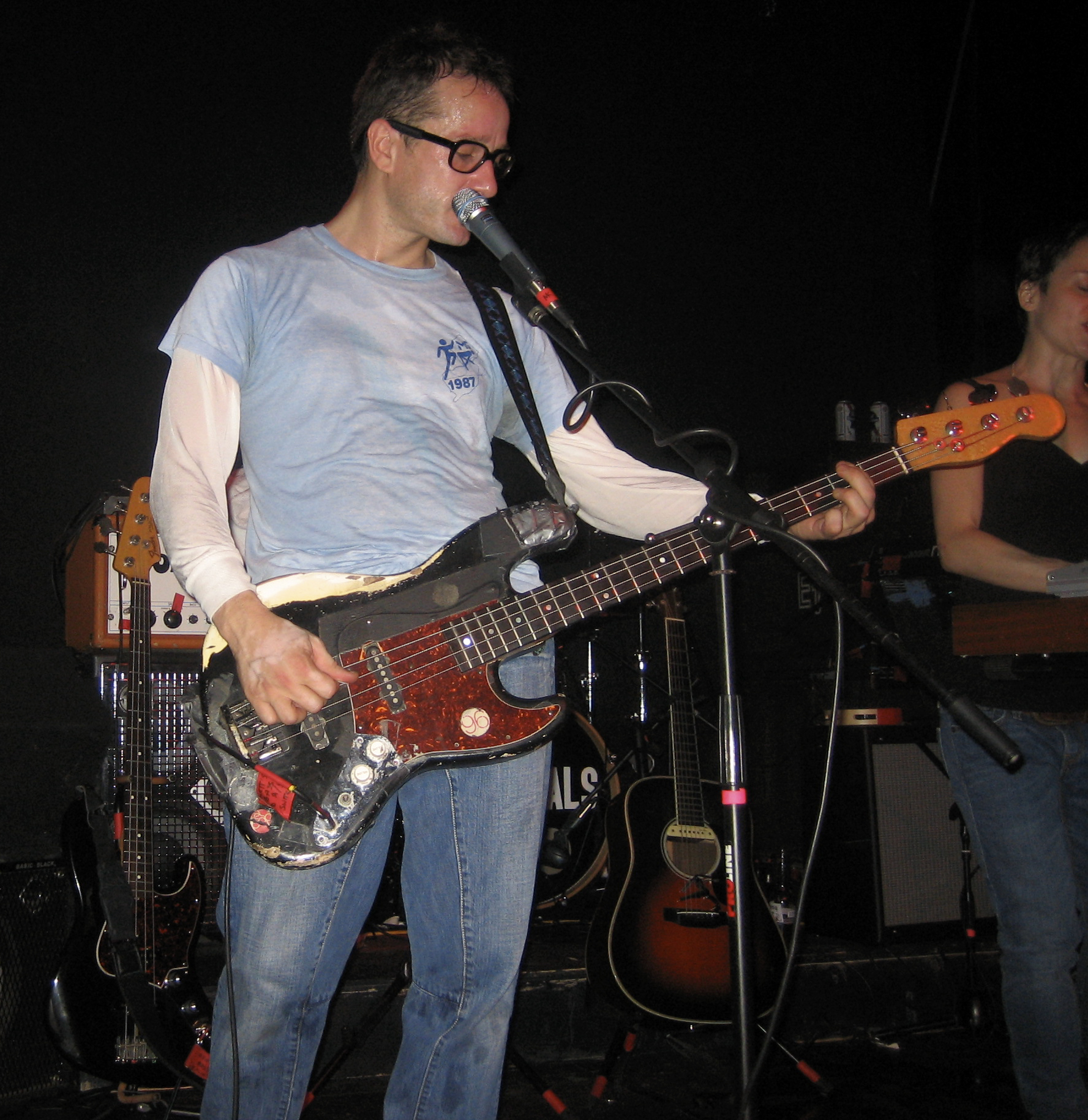
- Matt Sharp performing with The Rentals in 2007.

Background information
- Origin: Santa Monica, California, U.S.
- Genres: New wave, power pop, alternative rock, indie rock
- Years active: 1994–1999; 2005–present
- Labels: Maverick; Reprise; Boompa; Polyvinyl Record Co.; Only In Dreams
- Spinoff of: Weezer
- Members: Matt Sharp; Nick Zinner; Ronnie Vannucci Jr.
- Past members: Patrick Wilson; Rod Cervera; Tom Grimley; Petra Haden; Cherielynn Westrich; Kevin March; Mike Fletcher; Jim Richards; Maya Rudolph; Sara Radle; Ben Pringle; Rachel Haden; Craig Morris; Joseph Denton; Roger Galante; Dan Joeright; Jamie Blake; Justin Fisher; Lauren Chipman; Jess Wolfe; Holly Laessig; Ryen Slegr; Patrick Carney; Josh Hager; Carrie Bryden
- Website: therentals.com

The Rentals is an American rock band fronted by vocalist Matt Sharp. Sharp has been the only consistent member since the group's inception. The band's best selling single is "Friends of P." (1995). The Rentals released two albums, Return of the Rentals (1995) and Seven More Minutes (1999) on Maverick Records before quietly splitting in 1999 following a world tour. The group reformed in 2005 and have since released several EPs and two more full-length albums, Lost in Alphaville and Q36. Lost in Alphaville released August 26, 2014, on Polyvinyl Records. Q36 was released June 26, 2020. Numerous musicians have appeared with the group on recordings and in live shows. The group's most recent iteration consists of Sharp, Nick Zinner, and Ronnie Vannucci Jr.

== History ==
Matt Sharp founded the Rentals in early 1994. They released their debut album Return of the Rentals the following year, which featured the radio hit "Friends of P.". The music video was shot with antiquated equipment, on black and white film stock, with a total budget of less than $1,000. The video was added to MTV's playlist in early November 1995.

The Rentals initially used a fictional backstory in promotion. In a 1995 Billboard interview, they were described as "the sons and daughters of American embassy employees in Prague". The article outlined the backstory:

The band, which supposedly was founded in 1978, performed icy synthesizer anthems... Unfortunately, the Eastern Bloc act was forced to go underground after guitarist Rod Cervera was imprisoned for alleged espionage activities. After 12 years in prison, Cervera was released. Maverick mogul Madonna supposedly discovered the reunited act in Prague while attending its first concert in 15 years.

Band members on Return of the Rentals included Patrick Wilson (also of Weezer) on drums, Rod Cervera (guitar), Tom Grimley (keyboards), Petra Haden (violin, vocals), and Cherielynn Westrich (vocals, Moog). Petra's triplet sister Rachel Haden appears as an additional vocalist. After Sharp left Weezer, Wilson's studio replacement on the drums was Kevin March, and Mike Fletcher was the band's most frequent touring drummer. Maya Rudolph, of Saturday Night Live fame, also handled keyboard and backing vocals for the group's first tours in support of its debut album. The group headlined its own club shows, and also hit larger venues, as the opening act for such well-established acts as Alanis Morissette, Garbage, Blur, and the Red Hot Chili Peppers.

=== Return ===
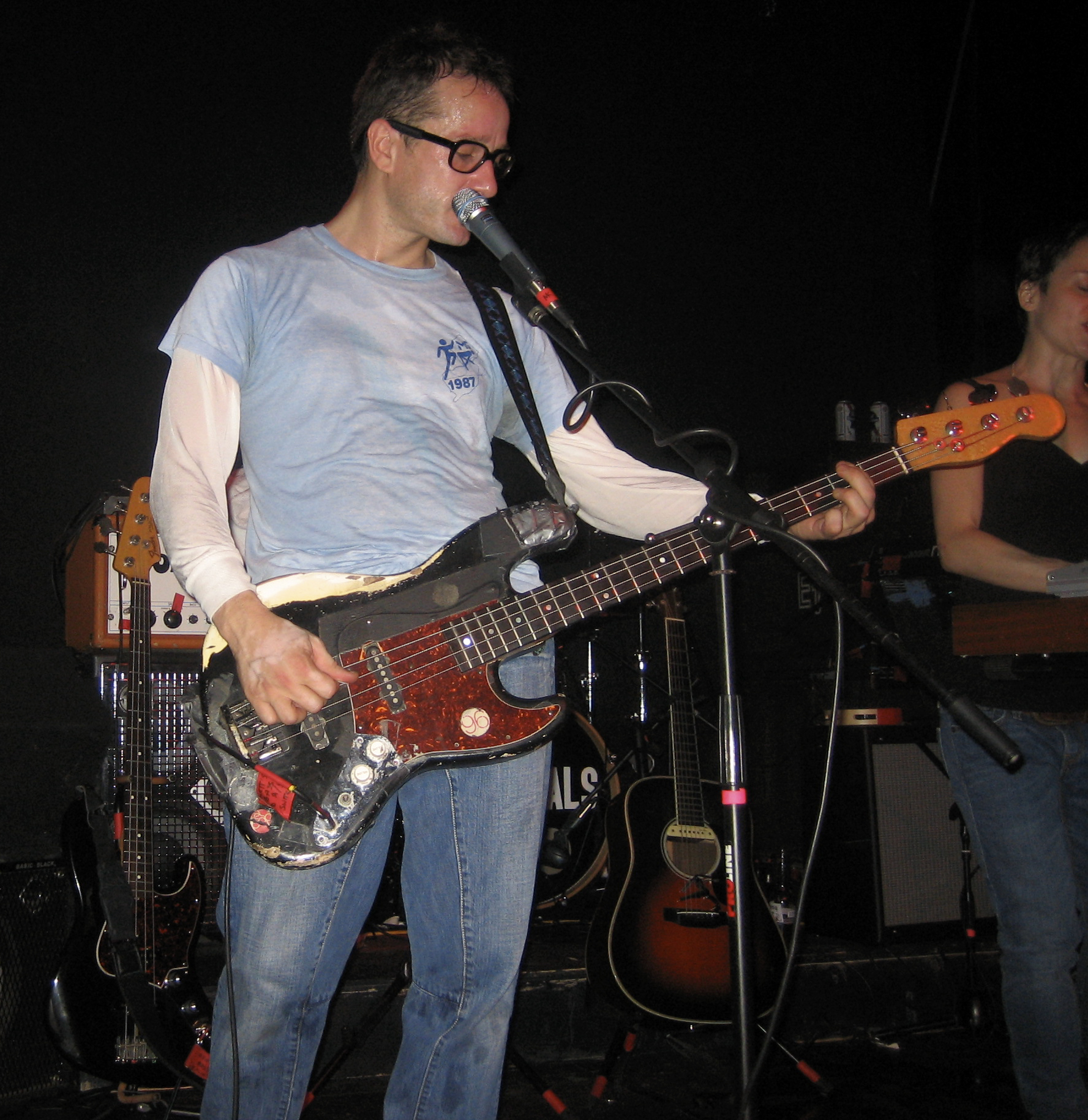
Matt Sharp performing with the Rentals in 2007

On October 24, 2005, the tenth anniversary of the band's first album's release, Sharp announced he was bringing back the Rentals after a six-year absence.

The Last Little Life EP

On August 14, 2007 the Rentals released their first new music in more than 8 years, The Last Little Life EP. Recorded and Co-Produced by drummer Dan Joeright, The Last Little Life EP consisted of three brand new tracks, as well as a new reworking of "Sweetness and Tenderness" originally from the group's 1995 debut Return of the Rentals.

In June 2008, Sara Radle announced her departure from the group to focus on her band Calamity Magnet. On September 27, 2008, the Rentals released a new song titled "Colorado" on the band's official website.

=== Songs About Time ===
On January 1, 2009, the Rentals announced their new yearlong multimedia project, Songs About Time.

=== Resilience ===
On April 12, 2011, the Rentals released an album titled Resilience. This was (as their official website states) originally recorded as part of the Songs About Time project, as accompanying music to the 'Films About Weeks' videos. The album was originally titled Tokyo Blues but renamed Resilience as a commentary on the band's perception of the character and resilience of the Japanese people after the Japanese tsunami and earthquake disaster. The band played both dates of the 2011 Nano Mugen festival in Japan.

=== Q36 ===
On October 4, 2017, Sharp announced that he had started work on the Rentals' fourth studio album with a potential release date in the first half of 2018. "The new record is a collaboration between myself, Nick Zinner and Dave Fridmann with a little help from a makeshift choir of incredible singers that I affectionately like to refer to as The Gentle Assassins." In the same announcement he revealed the new song "Elon Musk Is Making Me Sad" which was shared with the help of Wired. The album was released on June 26, 2020 and physically in December 2020 due to manufacturing and shipping issues.

== Discography ==
Studio albums

- Return of the Rentals (1995)
- Seven More Minutes (1999)
- Lost in Alphaville (2014)
- Q36 (2020)
