= Boompa Records =

- Founded: 2003
- Founder: Rob Calder, Scott Walker.
- Distributors: Outside Music (Canada), NAIL Distribution (United States), Lirico (Japan), The Orchard (Digital)
- Genre: Indie pop/rock
- Country of origin: Canada
- Location: Vancouver, British Columbia

Boompa Records is a Canadian independent record label, founded in 2003 and based in Vancouver, British Columbia, Canada.

== History ==
Boompa Records was established as a music production company in September 2003 by Rob Calder and Scott L.D. Walker, members of the Canadian indie band The Salteens. The label's creation was marked with the release of The Salteens' album Let Go of Your Bad Days in the spring of 2003.

Beginning in summer 2003, Boompa began its expansion into publicity services, music licensing, and artist management. As the label progressed, it further expanded into grant administration, tour management, promotions, booking, and web services. Boompa has organized grant administration for non-Boompa artists, including Hot Hot Heat, Destroyer, and Humans.

Boompa was described by Canadian music critic Adrien Begrand as releasing "consistently excellent" music and as "the most fun [record label] to discover" in 2004.

Songs by Boompa artists have been featured on Grey's Anatomy, Joan of Arcadia, Dawson's Creek, Degrassi, The L Word, Alienated, Radio Free Roscoe, and Yo Gabba Gabba!. Boompa artists have also been featured at POP Montreal, Canadian Music Week, South by Southwest, Halifax POP Explosion, Rifflandia, and Iceland Airwaves.

Boompa's distributors were Outside Music (Canada), NAIL Distribution (USA), Lirico (Japan), and The Orchard (digital). Boompa has released 59 catalogues of music. Its website is no longer active.

== Catalogue roster ==
- EMBASSYLIGHTS
- Woodpigeon
- Holy Oker
- Mu
- Dralms
- We Are the City
- The Salteens
- Small Sins
- The Rentals
- Reverie Sound Revue
- Colleen and Paul
- Circlesquare
- Patrick Brealey
- Leeroy Stagger
- Lullaby Baxter
- The Hylozoists
- Run Chico Run
- my project: blue
- Matt Sharp
- Sekiden
- The Lucksmiths
- The Belle Game
- Christopher Smith
