= OK Human =

Studio album by Weezer
- Released: January 29, 2021
- Recorded: 2018–2020
- Studios: Gloria Sound (Van Nuys; Van Gelder (Englewood Cliffs); Abbey Road (London); The Village (Los Angeles); Big Bad (Los Angeles); 4th Street Recording (Santa Monica)
- Genres: Orchestral pop; chamber pop; baroque pop; pop rock; emo
- Length: 30:27
- Labels: Atlantic; Crush
- Producer: Jake Sinclair

Weezer chronology
| Weezer (2019) | OK Human (2021) | Van Weezer (2021) |

Singles from OK Human
- 1. "All My Favorite Songs" Released: January 21, 2021

OK Human is the fourteenth studio album by American rock band Weezer, released on January 29, 2021 by Crush Music and Atlantic Records. The album was produced by Jake Sinclair, who had previously worked with the band on their tenth studio album, Weezer (White Album) (2016), with additional vocal production from Suzy Shinn.

Featuring a baroque-pop influenced sound, inspired by albums such as Harry Nilsson's Nilsson Sings Newman (1970) and the Beach Boys' Pet Sounds (1966), the album was recorded entirely with analogue equipment and features a 38-piece orchestra. The album was preceded by the lead single "All My Favorite Songs", released on January 21, 2021.

The album received generally positive reviews from critics, and reached number forty-one on the Billboard 200 and number ninety-one on the UK Albums Chart. OK Human is the first of two Weezer albums to be released in 2021, followed only four months later by the hard rock-influenced Van Weezer.

== Background ==
Work on OK Human began as early as 2017, when the band decided to make an album that combined rock instrumentation with an orchestra. Producer Jake Sinclair suggested that they hire a 38-piece orchestra and also gave Weezer frontman Rivers Cuomo the album Nilsson Sings Newman to listen to, on which singer Harry Nilsson covered songs by Randy Newman. They had just finished production on the album when they got an offer to join bands Green Day and Fall Out Boy on the Hella Mega Tour for the summer of 2020. This prompted them to start work on another album, Van Weezer, which featured music that would translate better to a stadium tour, but when the COVID-19 pandemic delayed the tour, they decided to switch around the release dates of the albums once again.

Cuomo first mentioned OK Human prior to the release of Weezer (The Black Album) in a February 2019 interview with the Los Angeles Times. He called the album "piano-based" and "very eccentric" and said that he had recorded strings for the album at Abbey Road Studios. In May 2020, Cuomo commented during a Zoom call that he estimated OK Human was "75% done", but that he did not anticipate the album being released in 2020. The album was planned to be released following their intended fourteenth album, Van Weezer, but when the album suffered a year-long delay following the COVID-19 pandemic, the band hinted that they were shifting their focus to completing OK Human first. On November 17, 2020, the band announced the completion of OK Human during a Q&A session following a livestream performance. On January 18, 2021, the band announced a release date of January 29 with the release date of the lead single, "All My Favorite Songs" on January 21.

The album's title is a play on the 1997 Radiohead album OK Computer. The cover art was illustrated by Mattias Adolfsson.

== Composition ==
Musically, OK Human has been described as orchestral pop, chamber pop, baroque pop, pop, pop rock, and emo.

== Critical reception ==
Professional ratings
Aggregate scores
| Source | Rating |
|---|---|
| AnyDecentMusic? | 7.3/10 |
| Metacritic | 75/100 |
Review scores
| Source | Rating |
| AllMusic | 4.5/5 stars |
| Clash | 4/5 stars |
| Consequence of Sound | B− |
| Entertainment Weekly | C− |
| Exclaim! | 8/10 |
| Kerrang! | 4/5 stars |
| The Line of Best Fit | 6/10 |
| NME | 3/5 stars |
| Pitchfork | 5.8/10 |
| Rolling Stone | 3.5/5 stars |

According to the review aggregator Metacritic, OK Human received "generally favorable reviews" based on a weighted average score of 75 out of 100 from 21 critic scores. Aggregator AnyDecentMusic? gave the album a 7.3 out of 10, based on their assessment of the critical consensus.

Writing for AllMusic, Stephen Thomas Erlewine wrote a positive review of the album, stating that the album "offers a singular, complete listening experience unlike anything else in their catalog." Similarly, R.A. Hagan, writing for Clash Music, praised the album for being "more careful, sincere, and delicately crafted" than the band's previous two studio albums, Pacific Daydream and the Black Album. Aaron Mook of Chorus.fm recommended the album, calling it "a left-field masterpiece that comes dangerously close to reaching the heights of the band's early career."

However, publications like Entertainment Weekly and Pitchfork were more critical of the album. Writing for Pitchfork, Ian Cohen wrote that the album felt "as impersonal as water-cooler small talk". Eli Enis wrote for Entertainment Weekly that "the fleeting moments of authenticity are hidden beneath a pile of hokey one-liners, spotty vocal performances, and awkward arrangements that rely on the accompanying orchestra to provide all of the emotional depth", but still noted that "it's arguably the darkest and most personal record that Cuomo has written since his fans' beloved Pinkerton."

Other music critics were more ambivalent in their judgement of the album. Writing for Consequence of Sound, Tyler Clark concluded; "Chalk it up to the unpredictability of 2021; despite the creative and cultural headwinds into which it was released, OK Human lands as a surprisingly charming collection of pop tunes whose imperfections add to rather than detract from the experience." In the review for The Line of Best Fit, Alex Wisgard stated that "Weezer's greatest misses may come from their frontman's visceral desperation to stay relevant, but it's a relief to hear them take chances and risk failure in such a new way. The album might just be OK, but it's been a long time since Weezer have dared to be this human."

== Track listing ==
All tracks are written by Rivers Cuomo, except "All My Favorite Songs", written by Cuomo, Ashley Gorley, Ben Johnson and Ilsey Juber.

| No. | Title | Length |
|---|---|---|
| 1. | "All My Favorite Songs" | 3:22 |
| 2. | "Aloo Gobi" | 3:03 |
| 3. | "Grapes of Wrath" | 2:50 |
| 4. | "Numbers" | 3:20 |
| 5. | "Playing My Piano" | 2:36 |
| 6. | "Mirror Image" | 1:17 |
| 7. | "Screens" | 2:11 |
| 8. | "Bird with a Broken Wing" | 3:51 |
| 9. | "Dead Roses" | 2:17 |
| 10. | "Everything Happens for a Reason" (Instrumental) | 0:23 |
| 11. | "Here Comes the Rain" | 2:27 |
| 12. | "La Brea Tar Pits" | 2:50 |
| Total length: | | 30:27 |

== Personnel ==
Personnel taken from OK Human liner notes, except where noted.

Weezer

- Rivers Cuomo – lead vocals, piano
- Brian Bell – acoustic guitar, organ, backing vocals
- Patrick Wilson – drums, backing vocals
- Scott Shriner – bass guitar, backing vocals

Production

- Jake Sinclair – producer
- Suzy Shinn – vocal producer, engineer
- Jonathan Allen – chief engineer, orchestra engineer (Abbey Road)
- William Wittman – chief engineer, orchestra engineer (Van Gelder)
- William Carroll – engineer
- Zach Fisher – engineer
- Brian Fombona – engineer
- Perry Margouleff – engineer
- Paul Pritchard – engineer
- Maureen Sickler – engineer
- Rachel White – engineer
- Lawton Burris – assistant engineer
- Andy Maxwell – assistant engineer
- Branko Presley – assistant engineer
- Karl Wingate – assistant engineer
- Lazaro Zarate – assistant engineer
- John Sinclair – mixing
- Pete Lyman – mastering

Additional musicians

- Rob Mathes – string, horn, and woodwind arrangements, conducting
- Abbey Road String Section (all except "All My Favorite Songs")
  - Julian Leaper – concertmaster, first violin
  - Steve Morris, Patrick Kiernan, Tom Pigott-Smith, Magnus Johnston, Pete Hanson, Mark Berrow, Paul Willey, Natalia Bonner, Cathy Thompson – violin
  - Kate Musket, Andy Parker, Lydia Lowndes-Northcott – viola
  - Martin Loveday, Dave Daniels, Ian Burdge – cello
- Van Gelder String, Wind, and Horn Sections
  - Lisa Kim – concertmaster; first violin on "All My Favorite Songs" and "Numbers"
  - Sharon Yamada, Joanna Maurer, Ann Lehmann, Matt Lehmann, Jung Sun Yoo, Peter Bahng – violin on "All My Favorite Songs" and "Numbers"
  - Becky Young, Michael Roth, Will Frampton – viola on "All My Favorite Songs" and "Numbers"
  - Alan Stepansky, Joel Noyes – cello on "All My Favorite Songs" and "Numbers"
  - Ray Riccomini, Tony Kadleck – trumpet
  - Erik Ralske, Anne Sharer – French horn
  - John Romero, Ryan Keberle – trombone
  - Tara Helen O'Connor – flute, piccolo
  - Pavel Vinnitsky – clarinet, bass clarinet
  - Keisuke Ikuma – English horn, oboe
  - Dan Shelly – bassoon, contrabassoon

== Charts ==
Chart performance for OK Human
| Chart (2021) | Peak position |
|---|---|
| Belgian Albums (Ultratop Flanders) | 129 |
| Belgian Albums (Ultratop Wallonia) | 43 |
| Canadian Albums (Billboard) | 69 |
| German Albums (Offizielle Top 100) | 35 |
| Hungarian Albums (MAHASZ) | 11 |
| Irish Albums (IRMA) | 54 |
| Scottish Albums (Official Charts) | 11 |
| Swedish Physical Albums (Sverigetopplistan) | 13 |
| Swedish Vinyl Albums (Sverigetopplistan) | 9 |
| Swiss Albums (Schweizer Hitparade) | 32 |
| UK Albums (Official Charts) | 91 |
| US Billboard 200 | 41 |
| US Top Alternative Albums (Billboard) | 5 |
| US Top Rock Albums (Billboard) | 6 |
