= All My Favorite Songs =

2021 single by Weezer

Single by Weezer

from the album OK Human
- Released: January 21, 2021
- Genre: Baroque pop; chamber pop; pop rock; orchestral pop; emo
- Length: 3:22
- Label: Atlantic; Crush
- Songwriters: Rivers Cuomo; Ashley Gorley; Ben Johnson; Ilsey Juber
- Producer: Jake Sinclair

Weezer singles chronology
"Hero" (2020)	"All My Favorite Songs" (2021)	"I Need Some of That" (2021)

Music video
- "All My Favorite Songs" on YouTube Frame from music video Frame from music video

"All My Favorite Songs" is a song by the American rock band Weezer, released on January 21, 2021, as the first single from their fourteenth studio album OK Human. A music video was released on the same day.

== Composition ==
The song begins with an introduction in A-flat major. After this, the song transitions to E major, which continues throughout the rest of the song.

In contrast to the recent hard rock-oriented singles from Van Weezer, "All My Favorite Songs" is more of a baroque pop and chamber pop song. According to Spin, "The orchestral pop-rock song is right in the Weezer wheelhouse, sounding like the logical next step in the evolution of Rivers Cuomo." Analog Planet, in their review, says the track "makes clear, right from the start, that Weezer's emo-essence is intact."

In regards to the song's title and lyrics, Cuomo stated that it reflects his music taste, by declaring "All my favorite songs are slow and sad."

== Reception ==
Chris Deville at Stereogum gave the song a positive review, stating "The song strikes a pleasing balance between chipper music and melancholy lyrics, landing squarely in Weezer’s radio-friendly zone without feeling entirely corny or sterile." In a more critical review, Clara V. Nguyen of The Harvard Crimson stated "Maybe viewing the orchestra as a dynamic and contemporary creative force, rather than a relic of the past, would help the band better integrate it into their work. “All My Favorite Songs" lingers somewhere between the 18th and 21st centuries, not quite knowing which it would rather inhabit."

== Music video ==
A music video for the song was released on January 21, 2021. It was directed by Colin Read, and produced Pulse Films and Obra House.

== Personnel ==
Personnel taken from OK Human liner notes, except where noted.

Weezer

- Rivers Cuomo – lead vocals, piano
- Brian Bell – acoustic guitar, organ, backing vocals
- Patrick Wilson – drums, backing vocals
- Scott Shriner – bass guitar, backing vocals

Production

- Jake Sinclair – producer
- Suzy Shinn – vocal producer, engineer
- William Wittman – chief engineer, orchestra engineer (Van Gelder)
- Jonathan Allen – chief engineer
- William Carroll – engineer
- Zach Fisher – engineer
- Brian Fombona – engineer
- Perry Margouleff – engineer
- Paul Pritchard – engineer
- Maureen Sickler – engineer
- Rachel White – engineer
- Lawton Burris – assistant engineer
- Andy Maxwell – assistant engineer
- Branko Presley – assistant engineer
- Karl Wingate – assistant engineer
- Lazaro Zarate – assistant engineer
- John Sinclair – mixing
- Pete Lyman – mastering

Additional musicians

- Rob Mathes – string, horn, and woodwind arrangements, conducting
- Van Gelder String, Wind, and Horn Sections
  - Lisa Kim – concertmaster, first violin
  - Sharon Yamada, Joanna Maurer, Ann Lehmann, Matt Lehmann, Jung Sun Yoo, Peter Bahng – violin
  - Becky Young, Michael Roth, Will Frampton – viola
  - Alan Stepansky, Joel Noyes – cello
  - Ray Riccomini, Tony Kadleck – trumpet
  - Erik Ralske, Anne Sharer – French horn
  - John Romero, Ryan Keberle – trombone
  - Tara Helen O'Connor – flute, piccolo
  - Pavel Vinnitsky – clarinet, bass clarinet
  - Keisuke Ikuma – English horn, oboe
  - Dan Shelly – bassoon, contrabassoon

== Charts ==
=== Weekly charts ===
Weekly chart performance for "All My Favorite Songs"
Chart (2021)	Peak position
Canada Rock (Billboard)	10
Switzerland Airplay (Schweizer Hitparade)	86
US Adult Pop Airplay (Billboard)	18
US Digital Song Sales (Billboard)	43
US Hot Rock & Alternative Songs (Billboard)	15
US Rock & Alternative Airplay (Billboard)	1

=== Year-end charts ===
Year-end chart performance for "All My Favourite Songs"
Chart (2021)	Position
US Hot Rock & Alternative Songs (Billboard)	27
US Rock Airplay (Billboard)	4

== AJR remix ==
"All My Favorite Songs (Remix)"
- Cover artwork for the AJR remix of "All My Favorite Songs"

Single by Weezer featuring AJR

from the album OK Human
- Released: May 12, 2021
- Genre: Baroque pop; chamber pop; pop rock; orchestral pop
- Length: 2:50
- Label: Atlantic; Crush
- Songwriters: Rivers Cuomo; Ashley Gorley; Ben Johnson; Ilsey Juber
- Producer: Jake Sinclair

AJR singles chronology
"World's Smallest Violin" (2021)	"All My Favorite Songs" (2021)	"Record Player" (2021)

Music video
- "All My Favorite Songs (Remix)" on YouTube

An alternate version of the song, featuring indie pop band AJR, was released on May 12, 2021, five days after the release of Weezer's fifteenth studio album, Van Weezer.

=== Accolades ===
Year	Ceremony	Category	Result	Ref.
2022	iHeartRadio Music Awards	Alternative Song of the Year	Nominated	

=== Personnel ===
Credits adapted from Tidal.

Weezer

- Rivers Cuomo – lead vocals, piano
- Brian Bell – acoustic guitar, organ, backing vocals
- Scott Shriner – bass, backing vocals
- Patrick Wilson – drums, backing vocals

AJR

- Adam Met – writing
- Jack Met – lead vocals, writing
- Ryan Met – production, writing

Production

- Ashley Gorely – writing
- Ben Johnson – writing
- Ilsey Juber – writing
- Jake Sinclair – production, audio mixing
- Jonny Coffer – production
- Andy Maxwell – assistant engineer
- Branko Presley – assistant engineer
- Karl Wingate – assistant engineer
- Lawton Burris – assistant engineer
- Lazaro Zarate – assistant engineer
- Jonathan Allen – chief engineer
- William Wittman – chief engineer
- Brian Fombona – engineer
- Maureen Sickler – engineer
- Paul Pritchard – engineer
- Perry Margouleff – engineer
- Rachel White – engineer
- Suzy Shinn – engineer
- William Caroll – engineer
- Zach Fisher – engineer
- Joe LaPorta – mastering
- Joe Zook – mixing
