= Weezer (disambiguation) =

Weezer is an American rock band.

Weezer may also refer to any of the seven eponymous albums by the band:

- Weezer (Blue Album), 1994
- Weezer (Green Album), 2001
- Weezer (Red Album), 2008
- Weezer (White Album), 2016
- Weezer (Teal Album), January 2019
- Weezer (Black Album), March 2019
- Weezer (Gold Album), 2026

== See also ==
- Wheezer (disambiguation)
