= The End of the Game (disambiguation) =

The End of the Game is a 1970 album by Peter Green.

The End of the Game may also refer to:

== Music ==
- End of the Game, a 1980 song by The Knack from ...But the Little Girls Understand
- The End of the Game, a 2019 song by Weezer from Van Weezer
- A 1999 Song by Sting from the recordings of Brand New Day

== Other ==
- The End of the Game (1919 film)
- The End of the Game (1975 film)
- The End of the Game, a 1986 novel by Sheri S. Tepper
