= Record player (disambiguation) =

A record player is a device for the mechanical reproduction of recorded sound.

Record player may also refer to:

- Record player (machine gun), a common nickname for the Degtyaryov machine gun
- "Record Player" (song), by Daisy the Great featuring AJR, from All You Need Is Time
- The Record Play, the fourth studio album by Mock Orange
