= Can't Knock the Hustle =

Can't Knock the Hustle may refer to:

- "Can't Knock the Hustle" (Jay-Z song), 1996
- "Can't Knock the Hustle" (Weezer song), 2018
