= Van Weezer =

Studio album by Weezer
- Released: May 7, 2021
- Recorded: 2019–2020
- Genres: Hard rock; alternative rock; arena rock; power pop; glam metal; pop metal
- Length: 30:49
- Labels: Atlantic; Crush
- Producer: Suzy Shinn

Weezer chronology
OK Human (2021)	Van Weezer (2021)	SZNZ: Spring (2022)

Singles from Van Weezer
- 1. "The End of the Game" Released: September 10, 2019; 2. "Hero" Released: May 6, 2020; 3. "Beginning of the End" Released: August 14, 2020; 4. "I Need Some of That" Released: April 21, 2021

Van Weezer is the fifteenth studio album by American rock band Weezer, released on May 7, 2021, by Crush Music and Atlantic Records. Featuring a style influenced by classic rock and hard rock, the album was announced in September 2019 with an original release date of May 2020, coinciding with announcement of the band's participation in the Hella Mega Tour alongside Green Day and Fall Out Boy. Due to the COVID-19 pandemic, the tour was delayed indefinitely and Van Weezer's release was delayed until May 2021, almost four months after the release of the band's previous album OK Human.

Four singles were released ahead of the album's release; "The End of the Game", "Hero", "Beginning of the End" and "I Need Some of That". The album received generally positive reviews from critics, and debuted and peaked at number 11 on the US Billboard 200 chart.

== Background ==
In February 2019, Weezer frontman Rivers Cuomo began working on new songs with a hard rock influence, in contrast to the pop rock and electropop sound that had been featured on the band's previous albums Pacific Daydream, the Teal Album, and the then-upcoming Black Album. In an interview that month with Entertainment Weekly, Cuomo mentioned that an album tentatively titled Van Weezer was in the works, and that it would take the band "back to big guitars". He remarked that when the band would perform "Beverly Hills" live in concert, he would perform a guitar solo that was not present on the recorded version of the song. "We noticed that, recently, the crowd just goes crazy when I do that. So it feels like maybe the audience is ready for some shredding again."

The album has been compared to their fourth studio album Maladroit (2002), and is inspired by 1970s and 1980s hard rock and heavy metal bands such as Kiss, Black Sabbath, Metallica and Van Halen (the last of whom inspired the album's title). Cuomo also stated that the album is "Blue Album-ish, but a little more riffy."

== Release ==
On September 10, 2019, the first single from Van Weezer, "The End of the Game" was released along with an announcement that the album would be released on May 15, 2020. The announcement coincided with the revelation of the Hella Mega Tour, a 2020 concert tour featuring Weezer, Green Day, and Fall Out Boy. On May 6, 2020, the second single "Hero" was released onto streaming services; while Weezer announced that the album release would be delayed due to the COVID-19 pandemic, stating that despite this fans would receive "surprises" within the next week. A short snippet of "Blue Dream" debuted on The Simpsons episode "The Hateful Eight-Year-Olds", on which Weezer guest-starred as themselves. On August 14, 2020, the band announced that the album had been delayed to May 2021 in order to coincide with the rescheduled Hella Mega Tour. That same day, the third single, "Beginning of the End", was released as a part of the soundtrack for Bill & Ted Face the Music.

On October 6, 2020, after Eddie Van Halen died, the album was dedicated to him. In addition to Van Halen, the album is also dedicated to Ric Ocasek, who produced the band's debut, The Blue Album, The Green Album, and Everything Will Be Alright in the End, as Ocasek died in September 2019.

The track listing was announced on April 20, 2021, and the fourth single, "I Need Some of That" was released the following day.

The album was officially released on May 7, 2021, along with an animated music video for "All The Good Ones".

The album was released just three and a half months after its predecessor, OK Human, which was at one point intended to be released after Van Weezer.

== Critical reception ==
Professional ratings
Aggregate scores
Source	Rating
Metacritic	67/100
Review scores
Source	Rating
AllMusic	4.5/5 stars
The A.V. Club	B+
Clash	7/10
DIY	2.5/5 stars
Exclaim!	7/10
Kerrang!	4/5 stars
NME	3/5 stars
Paste	5.5/10
Pitchfork	5.9/10
Rolling Stone	3/5 stars

According to the review aggregator Metacritic, Van Weezer received "generally favorable reviews" based on a weighted average score of 67 out of 100 from 20 critic scores. Stephen Thomas Erlewine at AllMusic gave the album a positive review, stating "...any of its retro origins are washed away by big, dumb sounds that keep the record grounded in the eternal now, an aesthetic choice that also helps the album be a rousing good time." Erlewine praised the homage to Van Halen on the album. Mark Beaumont from NME was a bit more mixed on the album, who considered the choruses as some of the band's best, but opined that the second half of the album as lesser quality from the first half. Beaumont went on to observe "there's a stone-cold classic Weezer album hidden beneath the fretboard flam."

== Track listing ==
All tracks are written by Rivers Cuomo, except where noted.

Van Weezer track listing
No.	Title	Writer(s)	Length
1.	"Hero"	Cuomo; Daniel Bedingfield; Daniel Omelio; Denzel Baptiste; David Biral; Dave Bassett	3:56
2.	"All the Good Ones"	Cuomo; Coast Modern	2:44
3.	"The End of the Game"	Cuomo; Tim Pagnotta	3:01
4.	"I Need Some of That"	Cuomo; Pagnotta; Josh Alexander; Billy Steinberg; Geoffrey Downes; John Wetton; Donald Roeser	3:19
5.	"Beginning of the End"	Cuomo; Billy Joel	3:15
6.	"Blue Dream"	Cuomo; Ozzy Osbourne; Randy Rhoads; Bob Daisley	2:50
7.	"1 More Hit"		3:05
8.	"Sheila Can Do It"	Cuomo; Kevin Ridel	2:57
9.	"She Needs Me"		2:52
10.	"Precious Metal Girl"	Cuomo; Nick Long	2:50
Total length:			30:49

Vinyl bonus tracks
No.	Title	Writer(s)	Length
11.	"I've Thrown It All Away"	Cuomo; Patrick Wilson; Jason Cropper	3:23
12.	"I Need Some of That (R.O.)"		0:50
Total length:			35:02

Notes

- On Apple Music, tracks 1 and 3 are switched.
- "I Need Some of That" contains interpolations of "Heat of the Moment", as written by Geoff Downes and John Wetton and as performed by Asia, and "(Don't Fear) The Reaper", as written by Donald Roeser and performed by Blue Öyster Cult.
- "Beginning of the End" contains an interpolation of "The Longest Time", as written and performed by Billy Joel.
- "Blue Dream" contains an interpolation of "Crazy Train", as written by Ozzy Osbourne, Randy Rhoads, and Bob Daisley and performed by Ozzy Osbourne.

== Personnel ==
Credits adapted from Van Weezer liner notes.

Weezer

- Rivers Cuomo – lead vocals, guitars, keyboards, backing vocals
- Patrick Wilson – drums
- Brian Bell – guitars, backing vocals
- Scott Shriner – bass guitar, backing vocals

Additional personnel

- Suzy Shinn – producer (all tracks), engineer (1, 2, 4, 5, 7–10), additional vocals (1, 2, 4), additional guitar (1, 2), synthesizer (2)
- Joe LaPorta – mastering
- Matty Green – mixer
- Charlie Brand – engineer (1, 2, 4–10), additional vocals (1, 4)
- Ivan Wayman – engineer (1, 4, 5, 7–10), assistant engineer (2, 6)
- Wesley Sideman – engineer (3, 6)
- Shawn Everett – engineer (5)
- Coast Modern – additional programming and additional vocals (2)
- Ric Ocasek – additional vocals (4)
- Andreas Kvinge Sandnes – assistant engineer (1, 2, 4–10)
- Sejo Navajas – assistant engineer (1, 2, 4, 5, 7–10)
- Jake Sinclair – assistant engineer (1, 6)
- Ruben Valle – assistant engineer (2, 4)
- Johnny Morgan – assistant engineer (3, 6)
- Lizzy Ostro – assistant engineer (3)
- Josh Skinner – assistant engineer (3)
- John Sinclair – assistant engineer (3)
- Michael Beinhorn – pre-production (3)
- Ross Garfield – drum technician (2, 5, 7–10)
- Mike Fasano – drum technician (3, 6)

== Charts ==
Chart performance for Van Weezer
Chart (2021)	Peak position
Australian Albums (ARIA)	83
Austrian Albums (Ö3 Austria)	26
Belgian Albums (Ultratop Flanders)	105
Belgian Albums (Ultratop Wallonia)	48
Canadian Albums (Billboard)	18
German Albums (Offizielle Top 100)	25
Hungarian Albums (MAHASZ)	11
Japanese Albums (Oricon)	13
Scottish Albums (Official Charts)	8
Swiss Albums (Schweizer Hitparade)	40
UK Albums (Official Charts)	30
US Billboard 200	11
US Top Alternative Albums (Billboard)	1
US Top Rock Albums (Billboard)	1
