= Heavy in Your Arms =

Single by Florence and the Machine

from the album The Twilight Saga: Eclipse – Original Motion Picture Soundtrack
- B-side: "Heavy in Your Arms" (C-Berg Remix)
- Released: 14 November 2010
- Recorded: August 2009
- Studio: Metropolis Studios (London)
- Genre: Gothic rock
- Length: 4:44 (album version); 3:32 (single edit)
- Label: Island; Moshi Moshi
- Songwriters: Florence Welch; Paul Epworth
- Producer: Paul Epworth

Florence and the Machine singles chronology
"Cosmic Love" (2010)	"Heavy in Your Arms" (2010)	"Shake It Out" (2011)

Music video
- "Heavy in Your Arms" on YouTube

"Heavy in Your Arms" is a song by English indie rock band Florence and the Machine. It was released on 14 November 2010 as the third single from the soundtrack of the 2010 film The Twilight Saga: Eclipse. The track was written by Florence Welch and Paul Epworth, with production handled by the latter. The song is a gothic rock ballad that has inspirations from hip hop and gospel music. Lyrically, the song is about "the weight of love and how sometimes it can be a burden between two people". The track was also featured in some of the band's later works.

The song received widespread critical acclaim, praising its musical style, lyricism, and Welch's vocal performance. A music video was released on 7 July 2010 and was directed by Tom Beard and Tabitha Denholm. The black and white video shows Welch being carried by a man while she sings the song. The single entered the top 100 charts in Scotland and the United Kingdom. Florence and the Machine performed the track live on several occasions, and was covered by American singer-songwriter Kelly Clarkson.

== Background and release ==
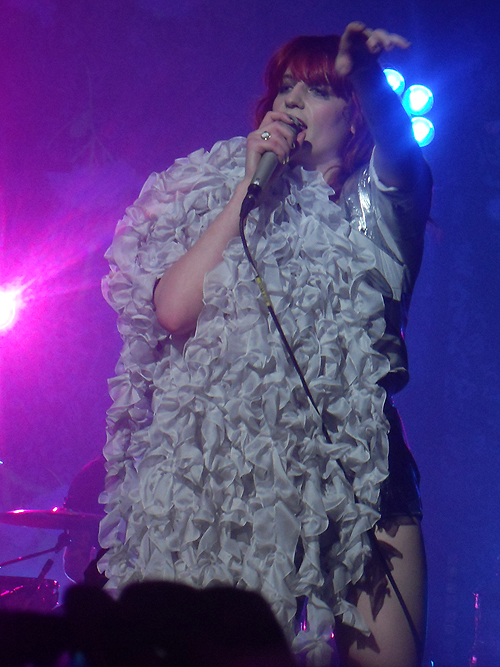
Florence Welch performing during the Lungs Tour in December 2009

The song was co-written by Florence Welch and Paul Epworth, with the latter handling the production of the track. "Heavy in Your Arms" was first included in The Twilight Saga: Eclipse soundtrack, released on 8 June 2010. In an interview with The Independent, Welch told she wanted to be involved in the soundtrack because she "thought it would be something fun to do; I'd never written a song for a soundtrack before. It's an interesting exercise as a songwriter. [The soundtrack team] didn't specifically say what bit of the movie it was going to be in or anything, but they did say it should have nothing about vampires or werewolves in it. I don't think they wanted anything with specific references to the story; it's not a musical, opera type thing – they just wanted something that fitted the emotional tone of it. I just thought about some of the themes in the book and wrote the song." "Heavy in Your Arms" was released as the third and final single from the film's soundtrack on 14 November 2010, and was later added to the tracklist of the reissue of the band's debut album Lungs (2009), titled Between Two Lungs (2010). The track was also included on the digital EP, Lungs: The B-Sides (2011).

== Composition and lyrics ==
"Heavy in Your Arms" is a gothic rock ballad, that draws influences from hip hop and gospel music. According to the sheet music published at Musicnotes.com by EMI Music Publishing, it's written in the key of A minor with a moderate tempo of 80 beats per minute, while Welch's vocals span a range of F_{3} to C_{5}. Its instrumentation consists of synthesizers, drums and piano; featuring gospel choirs, with an emphasis on a "heavy drum beat[,] a deep bass and piano riff". Lyrically, the song is a "more unconventional and darker tone for the band" in comparison to their previous singles, which some critics classified as "haunting". Welch declared on her website about the inspiration for the song:

'Heavy in Your Arms' I suppose is about the weight of love, and how sometimes it can be a burden between two people. I felt this was a strong theme in the Twilight series—is someone being rescued or are they being condemned, and is the love you carry bringing you down? I recorded it with Paul one evening, using a lot of strange reversed vocal samples and big hip hop piano. It's basically inspired by 90's hip hop, and gospel choirs, like most of my songs.

Mayer Nissim from Digital Spy, said the song "combines the chills of a classic horror flick with the intensity of a tragic romance collapsing in on itself like a swirling black hole." The track starts with synthesizers where Welch speaks rhythmically, "whispering dark" lyrics such as "He took me took me to the river / Where he slowly let me drown". Welch's vocals were classified as "dramatic" and "ear-shattering" when singing the chorus of the song, being accompanied by backing drums. "Heavy in Your Arms" finds Welch singing about the burden a person is to a beloved one: "My love has concrete feet / My love’s an iron ball / Wrapped around your ankles / Over the waterfall." She concludes before the outro with "When he held me in his arms / My feet never touched the ground" as a "concluding note".

== Critical reception ==
"Heavy in Your Arms" received widespread critical acclaim. Nima Baniamer of Contactmusic.com gave the song five stars writing, "With lingering vocals and an eerie melody, this track goes beyond the supernatural to create something purely magical. Halloween may have just passed us by, but prepare to get goosebumps by this one." Dara Hickey of Unreality Shout also gave the song five stars writing, "'Heavy in Your Arms' is easily one of Florence's best singles (and album tracks) to date, marrying sinister samples and twisted lyricism to make a perfectly gothic love song, but also managing to retain sentiment and desperation through her vocal performance." Ed Nightingale of The Gizzle Review commented that "the constant build towards the final chorus is perfectly pitched. Once it hits, Florence's voice soars over haunting harmonies and all the song's elements pull together." Nightingale awarded the song four stars out of five. Mayer Nissim of Digital Spy gave the song another five-star rating, calling it a "brooding mix of dark samples, twisted choirs and piano back Welch's almost spoken-word verses, leading up to truly ear-shattering choruses which sound unlike anything else in the charts right now", while naming it the band's "best single to date". The song was part of a Gigwise list titled "9 brilliant Florence + the Machine songs you may not have heard", which editor Peter Kandunias described that it "shows Florence at her most primal and bombastic [moment]".

== Music video ==
In this scene, Welch is carried by an unknown man while looking at the camera. Its visuals were compared to The Blair Witch Project's "lofi style" while the clothing was compared to the Victorian era costumes used in Kate Bush's music videos.

=== Background and synopsis ===
The music video for "Heavy in Your Arms" was released via the Eclipse soundtrack's YouTube channel on 7 July 2010. The video was directed by Tom Beard and Tabitha Denholm. The video, filmed entirely in black and white begins with Welch laying in a bed while being carried by the arms of a person hidden in the dark. The camera glitches and shows a scene of Welch in front of an abandoned building before it returns to the initial scene where she is taken from the bed. In the following scene, Welch is seen singing while lying on the floor, holding a shell similar to the single's artwork. The video also shows shots of Welch being carried by a man (played by Welch's former partner Stuart Hammond) whose face is not seen through various places. The video ends with a scene similar to the one in the beginning, with the only difference that Welch is returned to her bed by the same person.

=== Reception ===
Nightingale of The Gizzle Review described the video as "disturbing" and "stylish". Kevin O'Donnell writing for Spin magazine called the video "awesomely gritty". O'Donnell compared its production to The Blair Witch Project's "lofi style", and the Victorian era costumes to those from Kate Bush's videos. Hickey of Unreality Shout compared it to Lady Gaga's "Alejandro" music video. A contributor to Stereogum compared the visuals to the Toadies' "Possum Kingdom" and Tom Petty's "Mary Jane's Last Dance" music videos.

== Live performances and other usage ==
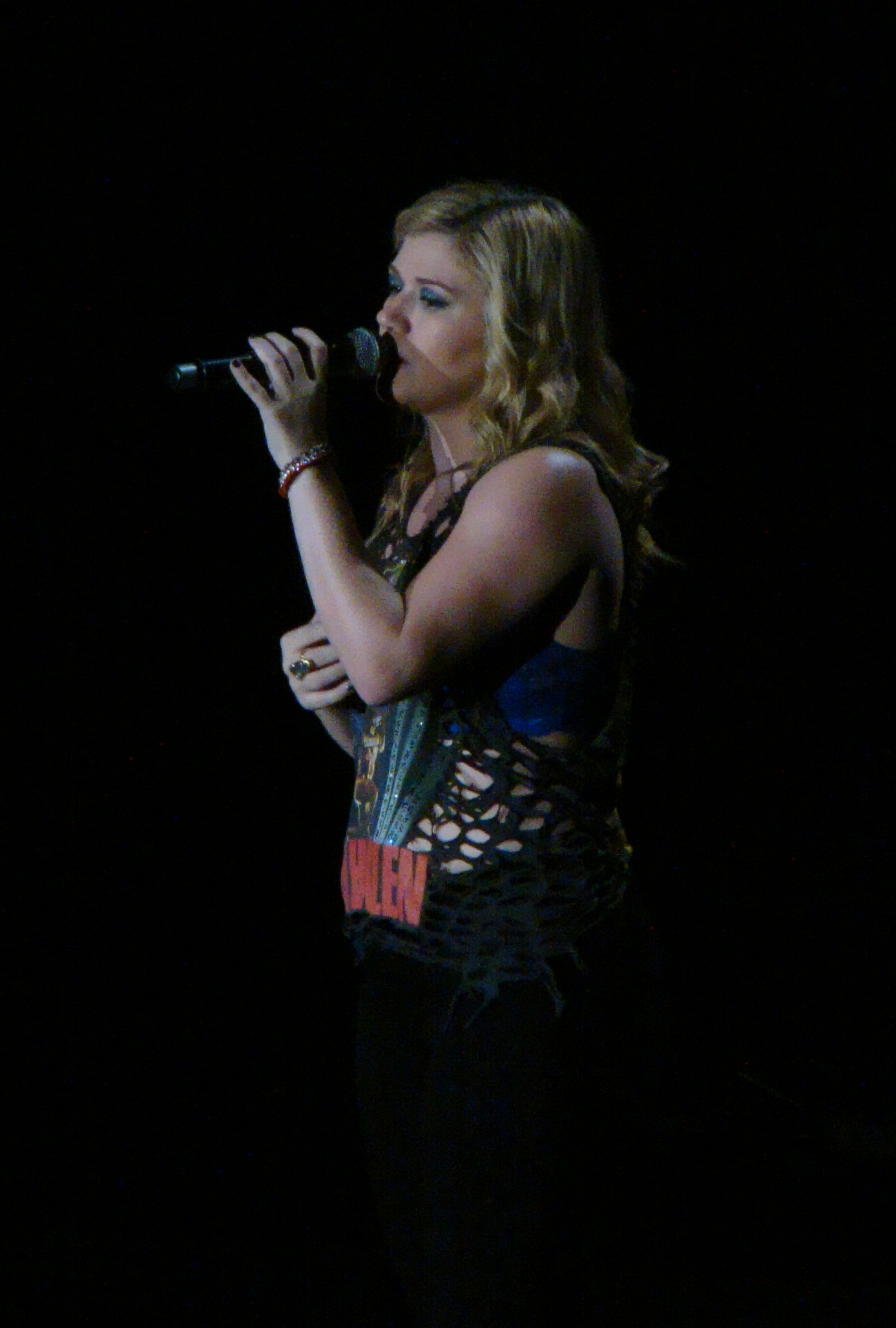
Kelly Clarkson (pictured in 2012) covered "Heavy in Your Arms" during her Stronger Tour.

"Heavy in Your Arms" was first performed at the Glastonbury Festival on 25 June 2010. The band also performed the song on 10 July at the Oxegen Festival, and at the Late Show with David Letterman in 16 December of the same year. Other performances were at the V Festival and the Bonnaroo Music Festival in August 2010 and October 2011, respectively. The band also performed the song on 7 November 2010 at the Wiltern Theatre, Los Angeles, being later released to the iTunes Store on 28 June 2011. In 2012, American singer Kelly Clarkson added the song to the set list of the North American leg of her Stronger Tour.

== Track listing ==
Digital download
No.	Title	Length
1.	"Heavy in Your Arms"	4:44
2.	"Heavy in Your Arms" (C-Berg Remix)	6:37

Promotional CD single
No.	Title	Length
1.	"Heavy in Your Arms"	3:32

== Credits and personnel ==
Credits adapted from the liner notes of Between Two Lungs.

=== Recording and management ===
- Mixed at Metropolis Studios (London, England)
- Published by EMI Music Publishing / Universal Publishing

=== Personnel ===
- Florence Welch – vocals, songwriter
- Paul Epworth – backing vocals, songwriter, producer, percussion, drums, piano
- Mark Rankin – recording engineer
- Cenzo Townshend – mixing
- Neil Comber – additional mixing
- John Davis – mastering

== Charts ==
Chart (2010)	Peak position
Scottish Singles Sales (Official Charts)	59
UK Singles (Official Charts)	53

== Release history ==
Release dates for "Heavy in Your Arms"
Region	Date	Format(s)	Label	Ref.
Australia	11 November 2010	Digital download	Island	
United Kingdom	14 November 2010	Digital download	Island	
