= Happy Hour (Weezer song) =

Single by Weezer

from the album Pacific Daydream
- Released: October 31, 2017
- Recorded: 2016
- Genre: Pop rock; R&B
- Length: 2:57
- Label: Atlantic
- Songwriters: Rivers Cuomo; Chris Sernel; Seann Bowe
- Producers: Butch Walker; Sernel; Bowe

Weezer singles chronology
"Feels Like Summer" (2017)	"Happy Hour" (2017)	"Rosanna" (2018)

Music video
- "Happy Hour" on YouTube

"Happy Hour" is a song by the American rock band Weezer. It was released as the second single from their eleventh studio album, Pacific Daydream on October 31, 2017. The song previously premiered at Beats 1 on October 18.

== Composition ==
"Happy Hour" is a departure from Weezer's usual distorted guitar sound, instead featuring a layered production and slower tempo. Vocalist Rivers Cuomo stated "We really challenged ourselves to leave behind the Nineties distorted guitar, downstroke eighth note thing and try to see what else we can do." Arielle Gordon of Spin described the song as a "breezy, carefree jaunt that feels more like a Kardashian interstitial than a loner anthem." The song has been characterized as pop rock and R&B.

== Reception ==
Gideon Plotnicki at Liveforlivemusic.com gave "Happy Hour" a positive reaction, stating "The song is certainly a departure from the band's signature sound, however, in the end, 'Happy Hour' is a good and acceptable pop song." Allan Raible from ABC News described it as a "focus track", adding "somewhere between its dance beat and its oddball, random cultural references, this song really clicks." Arielle Gordon of Spin called the song "a breezy, carefree jaunt" and "a chilled-out, jazzy ode to islands, sucking on limes and coconuts, and looking forward to happy hour."

== Charts ==
=== Weekly charts ===
Chart (2017–18)	Peak position
US Alternative Airplay (Billboard)	9
US Hot Rock & Alternative Songs (Billboard)	20
US Adult Alternative Airplay (Billboard)	21

=== Year-end charts ===
Chart (2018)	Position
US Alternative Songs (Billboard)	34
US Hot Rock Songs (Billboard)	73
US Rock Airplay Songs (Billboard)	48
