= The Prince Who Wanted Everything =

The Prince Who Wanted Everything may refer to:

- "The Prince Who Wanted Everything", a 2014 Adventure Time episode
- "The Prince Who Wanted Everything", a 2019 song by Weezer from their self-titled black album
