= Wheezer =

Wheezer may refer to:

- One who wheezes
- Wheezer Dell (1886–1966), American baseball pitcher
- Wheezer, nickname of Bobby Hutchins (1925–1945), American child actor
- Carl Wheezer, a character from Jimmy Neutron: Boy Genius
- A misspelling of Weezer, an American rock band
  - Also a name for seven eponymous albums by the band, see Weezer (disambiguation)
