= Feels Like Summer (Weezer song) =

Single by Weezer

from the album Pacific Daydream
- Released: March 16, 2017
- Recorded: 2016
- Genre: Pop rock; electropop; dance-pop; EDM
- Length: 3:15
- Label: Atlantic
- Songwriters: Rivers Cuomo; Patrick Morrissey; Jonny Coffer; J.R. Rotem; David Dahlquist; Dan Goldberger; Taylor Upsahl
- Producers: Jonny Coffer; J.R. Rotem (co.)

Weezer singles chronology
"California Kids" (2016)	"Feels Like Summer" (2017)	"Happy Hour" (2017)

Music video
- "Feels Like Summer" on YouTube

"Feels Like Summer" is a song by the American rock band Weezer. It was released on March 16, 2017, as the lead single for their 2017 album Pacific Daydream. The song was performed for the first time at SXSW on March 17, 2017.

== Composition ==
The song has been described as a pop rock, electropop, dance-pop, and EDM song by various critics.

== Music video ==
The music video for "Feels Like Summer" released on March 16, 2017, features animated versions of the band's members.

== Versions ==
Two versions of the song were officially released by the band. The first one is the radio and single version, and the second one is the acoustic version of the song, released on June 28, 2017.

1. Single version – 3:15
2. Acoustic version – 3:16

== Commercial performance ==
The song was a sleeper hit, becoming Weezer's most successful single since 2008's "Pork and Beans". It peaked at number one on the Mediabase Alternative chart and number two on the Billboard Alternative Songs chart. The song was heard on The Weather Channel's Local on the 8s segments as well as some of the channel's promos in the summer of 2017. The song was also featured in the FIFA 18 soundtrack.

== Chart performance ==
=== Weekly charts ===
Chart (2017)	Peak position
Switzerland Airplay (Schweizer Hitparade)	79
US Alternative Airplay (Billboard)	2
US Hot Rock & Alternative Songs (Billboard)	12
US Rock & Alternative Airplay (Billboard)	4
Canada Rock (Billboard)	34

=== Year-end charts ===
Chart (2017)	Position
US Alternative Songs (Billboard)	6
US Hot Rock Songs (Billboard)	34
US Rock Airplay Songs (Billboard)	17
