= Zombie Bastards =

2018 song by Weezer

Single by Weezer

from the album Weezer (The Black Album)
- Released: November 21, 2018
- Recorded: 2018
- Genre: Pop rock; electropop
- Length: 4:10
- Label: Atlantic
- Songwriters: Rivers Cuomo; Rami Yacoub
- Producer: Dave Sitek

Weezer singles chronology
"Can't Knock the Hustle" (2018)	"Zombie Bastards" (2018)	"The End of the Game" (2019)

Music video
- "Zombie Bastards" on YouTube

"Zombie Bastards" is a song by the American rock band Weezer, released as a single from their "Black Album" (2019) on November 21, 2018.

== Composition ==
Lyrically, "Zombie Bastards" addresses Weezer fans who are "stuck in the past" and who criticize them for changing their sound. The song contains ska-influenced guitars, a dub bass, sampling and keyboards, which was described by Tom Breihan from Stereogum as "Weezer doing stadium-goth Spotify-core." The song has been described as pop rock and electropop.

== Reception ==
Randall Colburn at The A.V. Club gave "Zombie Bastards" a positive response, stating "...while as chintzy and overproduced as so much latter-day Weezer, has a cheeky, soaring chorus that should have even the dourest Pinkerton stans shouting along." Emma Swann at DIY was more critical of the song, stating "‘Zombie Bastards’ is so childlike it'd be easy to question if it were intended for an infant audience if it wasn't for the, well, bastards."

== Personnel ==
Personnel taken from Weezer liner notes.

Weezer

- Brian Bell
- Rivers Cuomo
- Scott Shriner
- Patrick Wilson

Production

- David Andrew Sitek – producer, engineer
- Liza Boldyreva – assistant engineer
- Matty Green – mixing
- Eric Boulanger – mastering
- Michael Beinhorn – pre/post production
- Jason Hiller – additional guitar engineering
