= Neutron Star Collision (Love Is Forever) =

2010 single by Muse

Single by Muse

from the album The Twilight Saga: Eclipse: Original Motion Picture Soundtrack
- Released: 17 May 2010
- Genre: Alternative rock
- Length: 3:50 (album version); 3:12 (radio edit)
- Label: Warner Bros.; Helium-3
- Songwriter: Matt Bellamy
- Producers: Butch Vig; Muse

Muse singles chronology
| "Exogenesis: Symphony" (2010) | "Neutron Star Collision (Love Is Forever)" (2010) | "Survival" (2012) |

"Neutron Star Collision (Love Is Forever)" is a song by the English rock band Muse, featured on the soundtrack to the 2010 film The Twilight Saga: Eclipse. Recorded by the band in 2010, the song was released as the lead single from the album on 17 May 2010.

The single became a top ten hit in Italy. It was also certified gold by Federation of the Italian Music Industry.

== History ==
The song was first announced on Stephenie Meyer's official website. BBC Radio 1 aired the full song at 7.30pm on 17 May 2010, during Zane Lowe's show, accompanied by an interview with Matt Bellamy. Matt Bellamy explained that the song was written after he split with his longtime girlfriend at the end of 2009, and was based on his feelings at the beginning of their relationship. A 30-second preview of the music video is displayed on the official MTV website. While Muse featured on the Twilight and New Moon soundtracks previously (with "Supermassive Black Hole" and a special remix of "I Belong to You" respectively), this marks the first time the band has produced the lead single for a movie.

== Composition ==
The song is written in D-flat major, incorporating modal interchange in the chorus and outro.

== Music video ==
The video opens with Matt Bellamy playing on a piano while red smoke rises from the background, before it shows the rest of band. It is then intercut with scenes from The Twilight Saga: Eclipse, before Bellamy is seen playing the piano again at the end.

A "director's cut" of the video exists, which only shows the band playing the song, and does not include any scenes from Eclipse.

== Track listing ==
Digital download
| No. | Title | Length |
|---|---|---|
| 1. | "Neutron Star Collision (Love Is Forever)" | 3:51 |

UK promotional single
| No. | Title | Length |
|---|---|---|
| 1. | "Neutron Star Collision (Love Is Forever)" (Radio Edit) | 3:14 |
| 2. | "Neutron Star Collision (Love Is Forever)" (Album Version) | 3:51 |

== Reception ==
In a positive review, BBC Music described the song as Muse "turning their reality-altering Preposteriser Ray on their own back catalogue". Above and Beyond Magazine wrote: "Neutron Star Collision... reminds [me] of their previous work Origin of Symmetry, which is in my mind, the real and honest Muse."

== Charts and certifications ==
=== Weekly charts ===
| Chart (2010) | Peak position |
|---|---|
| Australia (ARIA) | 37 |
| Austria (Ö3 Austria Top 40) | 40 |
| Belgium (Ultratop 50 Flanders) | 24 |
| Belgium (Ultratop 50 Wallonia) | 3 |
| Canadian Hot 100 | 60 |
| Czech Republic Airplay (ČNS IFPI) | 28 |
| Denmark (Tracklisten) | 31 |
| Europe Hot 100 | 31 |
| Finland (Suomen virallinen lista) | 20 |
| Ireland (IRMA) | 35 |
| Italian Singles Chart | 10 |
| Netherlands (Single Top 100) | 25 |
| New Zealand Singles Chart | 27 |
| Norwegian Singles Chart | 10 |
| Scottish Singles Sales (Official Charts) | 11 |
| Spain (Promusicae) | 26 |
| Sweden (Sverigetopplistan) | 25 |
| Switzerland (Schweizer Hitparade) | 36 |
| UK Singles (Official Charts) | 11 |
| US Billboard Hot 100 | 77 |
| US Billboard Rock Songs | 24 |
| US Billboard Alternative Songs | 14 |

=== Year-end charts ===
| Chart (2010) | Peak position |
|---|---|
| Italian Singles Chart | 71 |
| Italy Airplay (EarOne) | 68 |
| UK Singles Chart | 30 |

=== Sales and certifications ===
| Region | Certification | Certified units/sales |
|---|---|---|
| Italy (FIMI) | Gold | 15,000^{*} |
^{*} Sales figures based on certification alone.
