= California Snow =

2018 song by Weezer

Single by Weezer

from the album Spell (2018 film) soundtrack and Weezer (The Black Album)
- Released: September 20, 2018
- Recorded: 2018
- Genre: Electronic rock; electropop; synth-pop; emo
- Length: 3:32
- Label: Atlantic
- Songwriter: Rivers Cuomo
- Producer: Dave Sitek

Weezer singles chronology
"Africa" (2018)	"California Snow" (2018)	"Can't Knock the Hustle" (2018)

Music video
- "California Snow" on YouTube

"California Snow" is a song by American rock band Weezer, released in September 2018 as a single from the 2018 film Spell. The song also appears on their 2019 album Weezer (aka the Black Album).

== Composition ==
"California Snow" starts with 1980's-style keyboard sound, later morphing into a more sunshine pop sound. It was described by Spin as "odd juxtapositions of strange and melancholic lyrical and chordal shifts with empty trappings of modern pop production". The song's overall style has been described as electronic rock, electropop, synth-pop, and emo.

== Reception ==
Andrew Sacher at the BrooklynVegan was critical of the song, stating "'California Snow' tries to be rap in the most embarrassing way, complete with lyrics like 'this is the definition of flow' and 'nobody cold as this.' Hearing him rap it is like the musical equivalent of going out to dinner with an older relative and watching in silence as they’re a dick to the waiter all night. It’s like, I love you but please, stop." The song got a similar response from Kara Bowan at The Itachan, where she opined "A stylistically flat vocal delivery and strong bassline makes it seem like 'California Snow' is improving after its uncomfortable beginning. But, halfway through, unexpected piano chords and another attempt at almost-rapping take over, leading to an awkward finish." However, Devon Hannan at Alternative Press stated that the song is "perfect for fans of Weezer’s latest pop direction".

== Personnel ==
Personnel taken from Weezer liner notes.

Weezer

- Brian Bell
- Rivers Cuomo
- Scott Shriner
- Patrick Wilson

Production

- David Andrew Sitek – producer, engineer
- Liza Boldyreva – assistant engineer
- Matty Green – mixing
- Eric Boulanger – mastering
- Michael Beinhorn – pre/post production
- Jason Hiller – additional guitar engineering
