= The Twilight Saga: Eclipse (soundtrack) =

2010 album by various artists

The Twilight Saga: Eclipse (Original Motion Picture Soundtrack)

Soundtrack album by various artists
- Released: June 8, 2010
- Recorded: Various times
- Genre: Indie rock
- Length: 59:27
- Label: Atlantic
- Producer: Alexandra Patsavas

Singles from The Twilight Saga: Eclipse (Original Motion Picture Soundtrack)
- 1. "Neutron Star Collision (Love Is Forever)" Released: May 17, 2010; 2. "Eclipse (All Yours)" Released: May 25, 2010; 3. "Heavy in Your Arms" Released: November 15, 2010

The Twilight Saga: Eclipse (Original Motion Picture Soundtrack) is the official soundtrack to The Twilight Saga: Eclipse, released on June 8, 2010.

The soundtrack was once again co-produced by Alexandra Patsavas, the music supervisor for the previous two films. The track list for the album was revealed in a special MySpace revelation on May 12, 2010. The third soundtrack in The Twilight Saga series, the album debuted at number two on the U.S. Billboard 200 albums chart with sales of 146,000 copies.

The score for film, The Twilight Saga: Eclipse (The Score), commonly referred to as Eclipse (The Score), released on June 29, 2010, was composed, orchestrated and conducted by Academy Award winner Howard Shore.

== Singles ==
The Twilight Saga: Eclipse (Original Motion Picture Soundtrack) generated three singles. "Neutron Star Collision (Love Is Forever)", by British band Muse, was released on May 17, 2010. The second single "Eclipse (All Yours)", by Canadian band Metric, released on May 25, 2010. While the third and final single, "Heavy in Your Arms", by English indie rock band Florence + the Machine, was released on November 15, 2010.

== Track listing ==
The track list was revealed during a special all-day reveal event on the album's MySpace page. It followed the formula of the previous albums, including the songs used in the film ended off by one score track from the score album.

Just like in the soundtracks for both "Twilight" and "New Moon", the band Muse features on the album, along with artists such as Sia, The Black Keys and Cee Lo Green being included.

Eclipse – Standard edition
| No. | Title | Writer(s) | Artist | Length |
|---|---|---|---|---|
| 1. | "Eclipse (All Yours)" | Emily Haines; Howard Shore; James Shaw | Metric | 3:45 |
| 2. | "Neutron Star Collision (Love Is Forever)" | Matthew Bellamy | Muse | 3:50 |
| 3. | "Ours" | Dan Wilson; Sam Endicott | The Bravery | 3:47 |
| 4. | "Heavy in Your Arms" | Florence Welch; Paul Epworth | Florence + the Machine | 4:44 |
| 5. | "My Love" | Oliver Kraus | Sia | 5:10 |
| 6. | "Atlas" | Fanfarlo | Fanfarlo | 3:27 |
| 7. | "Chop and Change" | Dan Auerbach; Patrick Carney | The Black Keys | 2:25 |
| 8. | "Rolling in on a Burning Tire" | Alison Mosshart; Dean Fertita; Jack Lawrence; Jack White | The Dead Weather | 3:53 |
| 9. | "Let's Get Lost" | Beck Hansen; Natasha Khan | Beck and Bat for Lashes | 4:10 |
| 10. | "Jonathan Low" | Chris Baio; Christopher Tomson; Ezra Koenig; Rostam Batmanglij | Vampire Weekend | 3:32 |
| 11. | "With You in My Head" | Alex Maas; James Griffith; James Lavelle; Pablo Clements | UNKLE feat. The Black Angels | 4:43 |
| 12. | "Million Miles an Hour" | Greg Lyons; Josh Ostrander; Melissa Dougherty | Eastern Conference Champions | 4:07 |
| 13. | "Life on Earth" | Benjamin Bridwell; Bill Reynolds; Creighton Barrett; Ryan Monroe; Tyler Ramsey | Band of Horses | 5:30 |
| 14. | "What Part of Forever" | Cee Lo Green; Oh, Hush!; Rob Kleiner | Cee Lo Green | 3:57 |
| 15. | "Jacob's Theme" | Andrew Dudman | Howard Shore | 2:27 |
| Total length: | | | | 59:27 |

Eclipse – Brazil bonus track
| No. | Title | Writer(s) | Artist | Length |
|---|---|---|---|---|
| 16. | "Eterno pra Você (Eternal to You)" | Fiuk | Hori | 3:51 |
| Total length: | | | | 63:18 |

Eclipse – Latin America, Mexico and Spain bonus track
| No. | Title | Writer(s) | Artist | Length |
|---|---|---|---|---|
| 16. | "Magia y Deseo" (Magic and Desire) | Jesse Huerta; Joy Huerta | Jesse & Joy | 3:31 |
| Total length: | | | | 62:45 |

Eclipse – Australia bonus track
| No. | Title | Artist | Length |
|---|---|---|---|
| 16. | "Edge of My Dreams" | Lisa Mitchell | 4:19 |
| Total length: | | | 63:46 |

Eclipse – Germany bonus track
| No. | Title | Artist | Length |
|---|---|---|---|
| 16. | "Don't You Mourn The Sun" | MiMi | 3:43 |
| Total length: | | | 63:10 |

Eclipse – Australia and Germany deluxe edition bonus tracks
| No. | Title | Artist | Length |
|---|---|---|---|
| 17. | "The Line" | Battles | 5:05 |
| 18. | "How Can You Swallow So Much Sleep" | Bombay Bicycle Club | 3:00 |
| Total length: | | | 71:51 |

Eclipse – US and Europe bonus tracks
| No. | Title | Artist | Length |
|---|---|---|---|
| 16. | "The Line" | Battles | 5:05 |
| 17. | "How Can You Swallow So Much Sleep" | Bombay Bicycle Club | 3:00 |
| Total length: | | | 67:32 |

Eclipse – iTunes deluxe bonus tracks
| No. | Title | Writer(s) | Artist | Length |
|---|---|---|---|---|
| 17. | "How Can You Swallow So Much Sleep" | | Bombay Bicycle Club | 3:00 |
| 18. | "Atlas" (The Time and Space Machine Remix) | Fanfarlo | Fanfarlo | 6:04 |
| 19. | "What Part of Forever" (Johan Hugo Remix) | Cee Lo Green; Oh, Hush!; Rob Kleiner | Cee Lo Green | 4:51 |
| Total length: | | | | 78:27 |

Eclipse – Germany and Latin America iTunes deluxe bonus tracks
| No. | Title | Writer(s) | Artist | Length |
|---|---|---|---|---|
| 17. | "The Line" | | Battles | 5:05 |
| 18. | "How Can You Swallow So Much Sleep" | | Bombay Bicycle Club | 3:00 |
| 19. | "Atlas" (The Time and Space Machine Remix) | Fanfarlo | Fanfarlo | 6:04 |
| 20. | "What Part of Forever" (Johan Hugo Remix) | Cee Lo Green; Oh, Hush!; Rob Kleiner | Cee Lo Green | 4:51 |
| Total length: | | | | 82:46 |

== Reception ==
Professional ratings
Review scores
| Source | Rating |
|---|---|
| Allmusic | 4/5 stars |
| Drowned in Sound | 4/10 stars |
| Entertainment Weekly | (B+) |
| Rolling Stone | 3.5/5 stars |

According to Metacritic, the soundtrack has received a weighted mean of 76, indicating "generally favorable reviews". It has generally been better reviewed than the soundtrack for New Moon, which received a score of 70, however, Entertainment Weekly gave New Moon a grade of A, whereas Eclipse was given a B+. Conversely, Allmusic gave the soundtrack for Eclipse a better rating than that for New Moon, awarding it 4 stars out of 5 rather than the previous soundtrack, which received only 2.

== Chart performance ==
The soundtrack debuted at number two on the U.S. Billboard 200 albums chart behind Glee: The Music, Journey to Regionals with sales of 146,000 copies, making it the second soundtrack in the Twilight series that did not debut at number one on the U.S. Billboard 200, and the first that never hit number one. It peaked at #4 on the German albums chart. In Mexico, the album peaked at #4 on the international albums chart and at #7 on the overall chart. As of December 2010, the album has sold 517,000 copies in the U.S. and more than one million copies worldwide.

== Charts and certifications ==
=== Weekly charts ===
| Chart (2010) | Peak position |
|---|---|
| Australian Albums (ARIA) | 2 |
| Austrian Albums (Ö3 Austria) | 1 |
| Belgian Albums (Ultratop Flanders) | 10 |
| Belgian Albums (Ultratop Wallonia) | 4 |
| Canadian Albums (Billboard) | 4 |
| Danish Albums (Hitlisten) | 22 |
| Dutch Albums (Album Top 100) | 52 |
| Finnish Albums (Suomen virallinen lista) | 29 |
| French Albums (SNEP) | 12 |
| German Albums (Offizielle Top 100) | 4 |
| Hungarian Albums (MAHASZ) | 5 |
| New Zealand Albums (RMNZ) | 5 |
| Norwegian Albums (VG-lista) | 36 |
| Spanish Albums (Promusicae) | 12 |
| Swiss Albums (Schweizer Hitparade) | 9 |
| US Billboard 200 | 2 |
| US Top Rock Albums (Billboard) | 1 |
| US Soundtrack Albums (Billboard) | 1 |

=== Year-end charts ===
| Chart (2010) | Position |
|---|---|
| Australian Albums (ARIA) | 59 |
| Austrian Albums (Ö3 Austria) | 22 |
| Belgian Albums (Ultratop Wallonia) | 99 |
| French Albums (SNEP) | 135 |
| German Albums (Offizielle Top 100) | 75 |
| US Billboard 200 | 58 |
| US Top Rock Albums (Billboard) | 10 |
| US Soundtrack Albums (Billboard) | 7 |

| Chart (2011) | Position |
|---|---|
| US Soundtrack Albums (Billboard) | 23 |

=== Certifications ===
| Region | Certification | Certified units/sales |
|---|---|---|
| Australia (ARIA) | Gold | 35,000^{^} |
| Austria (IFPI Austria) | Gold | 10,000^{*} |
| Canada (Music Canada) | Gold | 40,000^{^} |
| Germany (BVMI) | Gold | 100,000^{^} |
| New Zealand (RMNZ) | Gold | 7,500^{^} |
| United Kingdom (BPI) | Gold | 100,000^{^} |
| United States (RIAA) | Gold | 500,000^{^} |
^{*} Sales figures based on certification alone.^{^} Shipments figures based on certification alone.

== Accolades ==
- 2010 Teen Choice Awards:
  - Teen Choice Awards for Choice Love Song: "Neutron Star Collision (Love Is Forever)" by Muse (Nominated)
- 2010 American Music Awards:
  - American Music Awards: Soundtracks – Favourite Album (Nominated)

== The Twilight Saga: Eclipse (The Score) ==
The Twilight Saga: Eclipse (The Score)

Film score by Howard Shore
- Released: June 29, 2010
- Genre: Orchestral
- Length: 65:45
- Label: E1 Music

Howard Shore composed the score for the film, following Alexandre Desplat, who scored New Moon, and Carter Burwell, who scored Twilight. "Eclipse (All Yours)" from the soundtrack is included on the score album as part of the cue, "Wedding Plans". The score album debuted and peaked at #20 on Billboard 200, higher than the previous The Twilight Saga score albums (the Twilight score charted at #65 and the New Moon at #80).

=== Track listing ===
Eclipse (The Score) – Standard edition
| No. | Title | Length |
|---|---|---|
| 1. | "Riley" | 1:55 |
| 2. | "Compromise/Bella's Theme" | 2:44 |
| 3. | "Bella's Truck/Florida" | 2:52 |
| 4. | "Victoria" | 2:18 |
| 5. | "Imprinting" | 2:07 |
| 6. | "The Cullens Plan" | 2:18 |
| 7. | "First Kiss" | 2:00 |
| 8. | "Rosalie" | 4:09 |
| 9. | "Decisions, Decisions..." | 1:50 |
| 10. | "They're Coming Here" | 4:01 |
| 11. | "Jacob Black" | 2:13 |
| 12. | "Jasper" | 3:56 |
| 13. | "Wolf Scent" | 2:19 |
| 14. | "Mountain Peak" | 5:02 |
| 15. | "The Kiss" | 3:45 |
| 16. | "The Battle/Victoria Vs. Edward" | 6:40 |
| 17. | "Jane" | 3:12 |
| 18. | "As Easy as Breathing" | 3:21 |
| 19. | "Wedding Plans" | 6:12 |
| Total length: | | 65:45 |

Eclipse (The Score) – North America iTunes bonus track
| No. | Title | Length |
|---|---|---|
| 16. | "Eclipse Score" | 2:48 |
| Total length: | | 68:33 |
