= Mexican Fender =

Promotional single by Weezer

from the album Pacific Daydream
- Released: August 17, 2017
- Recorded: 2016
- Genre: Alternative rock; power pop
- Length: 3:11
- Label: Atlantic
- Songwriters: Rivers Cuomo; Toby Gad
- Producer: Toby Gad

Music video
- "Mexican Fender" on YouTube

"Mexican Fender" is a song by the American rock band Weezer. It was released as a promotional single from their eleventh studio album Pacific Daydream on August 17, 2017, premiering on Beats 1.

== Reception ==
DIY described "Mexican Fender" as a "perfect three-and-a-half minute slice of giddy, upbeat power-pop, sprinkling Weezer’s trademark “oohs” all over, and has a smattering of self-awareness." Andy Cush at Spin called the song a "spiritual sequel" to "In the Garage" from the band's 1994 self-titled release (aka the Blue Album).

== Music video ==
The music video was released on August 17, 2017. The video features a seagull falling in love with a woman beach goer. The seagull tries various methods to impress the woman, ending in her kissing it on the head. The beach goer is played by Chloe Mae, and the video was directed by Lior Molcho.

== Chart performance ==
=== Weekly charts ===
Chart (2017)	Peak position
Mexico (Billboard Ingles Airplay)	39
