= Daisy the Great =

American indie pop band

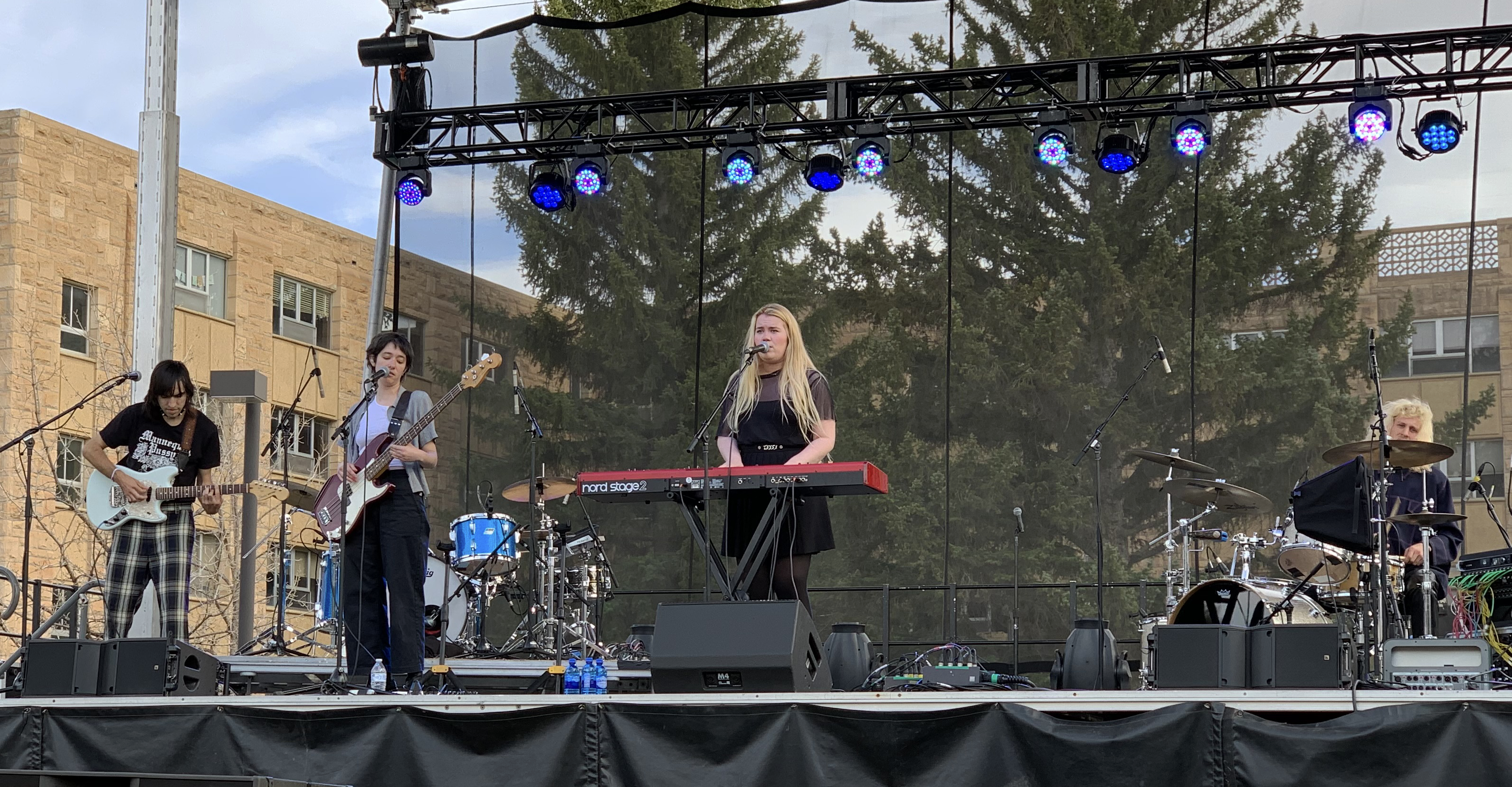
- Daisy the Great performing in 2022

Background information
- Origin: Brooklyn, New York, United States
- Genres: Indie pop, indie rock, folk
- Years active: 2016–present
- Label: Paper Moon Records
- Members: Kelley Dugan; Mina Walker; Briana Archer; Matt Lau; Bernardo Ochoa; Matti Dunietz
- Website: www.daisythegreat.com

Daisy the Great is an American indie band led by singer-songwriters Kelley Dugan and Mina Walker. They rose to prominence with their 2017 debut single "The Record Player Song". Later, a remix of the song called "Record Player" was released in August 2021, with additional verses and production performed by AJR. It went to number 6 on the Billboard Alternative Airplay chart.

As of July 2025, the band has amassed over 820,000 monthly streamers on Spotify. They have released three studio albums.

== History ==
Kelley Dugan and Mina Walker met as acting majors at NYU's Tisch School of the Arts. Dugan is from New York, and Walker grew up in New Orleans. They formed Daisy the Great in 2016, and released their first EP, I've Got a Few Friends & I Wish They Were Mine, in 2018. They released their debut album, I'm Not Getting Any Taller, in January 2019. The single "Record Player" became a hit on TikTok, accumulating over 270 million views. They released a second EP, Soft Songs, in 2020 and their second album, All You Need Is Time, in 2022. 2024 saw the release of a third EP, Spectacle: Daisy the Great vs. Tony Visconti, and in 2025, they released a third album, The Rubber Teeth Talk.

In May 2026, they released the single, Can I Have a Moment, inspired by the feelings after a breakup, stating that it was “a cry into the ether of wanting to be loved and noticed by someone who once loved you back”. Actor and close friend of the band Jack Haven features in the music video for the single.

Daisy the Great has opened for the Happy Fits, Indigo Girls, Sidney Gish, and Samia, and toured with AJR, Half Alive, The Kooks, and The Vaccines. They have a tour scheduled for 2026.

== Lineup ==
- Kelley Dugan: lead vocals, guitar, keyboards
- Mina Walker: lead vocals, guitar, bass guitar
- Briana Archer: backup vocals
- Matt Lau: guitar, bass guitar
- Bernardo Ochoa: guitar, bass guitar
- Matti Dunietz: drums

== Discography ==
=== Studio albums ===
Title	Album details
I'm Not Getting Any Taller	Released: January 18, 2019; Label: Paper Moon Records; Format: Streaming, digital download
All You Need Is Time	Released: October 28, 2022; Label: S-Curve Records; Format: Streaming, digital download, vinyl
The Rubber Teeth Talk	Released: June 27, 2025; Label: S-Curve Records; Format: Streaming, digital download, vinyl

=== Extended plays ===
Title	Album details
I've Got a Few Friends & I Wish They Were Mine	Released: January 19, 2018; Label: S-Curve Records; Format: Streaming, digital download
Soft Songs	Released: May 29, 2020; Label: Self-released; Format: Streaming, digital download
Spectacle: Daisy the Great vs. Tony Visconti	Released: September 27, 2024; Label: S-Curve Records; Format: Streaming, digital download

=== Singles ===
List of other charted songs, with year released, chart positions, and album name
Title	Year	Peak chart positions				Certifications	Album
Title	Year	US Adult Alt.	US Adult	US Alt.	CAN Rock	Certifications	Album
"The Record Player Song"	2017	—	—	—	—		I've Got a Few Friends & I Wish They Were Mine
"Built My Home on Hollow Ground"	2017	—	—	—	—		I've Got a Few Friends & I Wish They Were Mine
"Company"	2018	—	—	—	—		I'm Not Getting Any Taller
"Seasoned"	2018	—	—	—	—		I'm Not Getting Any Taller
"Famous"	2018	—	—	—	—		I'm Not Getting Any Taller
"I'm Fine"	2019	—	—	—	—		Non-album singles
"Friend" (with Sipper)	2020	—	—	—	—		Non-album singles
"Half Sleeping on the Carpet"	2020	—	—	—	—		Soft Songs
"Guess It's a Bad Time to Be Sad"	2020	—	—	—	—		Soft Songs
"And I'm Just the Same as I Always Was"	2020	—	—	—	—		Soft Songs
"Little Dove"	2020	—	—	—	—		Soft Songs
"To Be Alive"	2020	—	—	—	—		Soft Songs
"LaLa" (with Sipper)	2020	—	—	—	—		Non-album singles
"Pool" (with LazyLazy)	2020	—	—	—	—		Non-album singles
"Persephone"	2021	—	—	—	—		Non-album singles
"Record Player" (with AJR)	2021	24	38	6	44	RIAA: Gold	All You Need Is Time (Deluxe Edition)
"Glitter"	2021	—	—	—	—		All You Need Is Time
"Cry in the Mirror"	2022	—	—	—	—		All You Need Is Time
"Easy"	2022	—	—	—	—		All You Need Is Time
"Aluminum"	2022	—	—	—	—		All You Need Is Time
"Liar"	2022	—	—	—	—		All You Need Is Time
