= Hero (Weezer song) =

2020 song by Weezer

Single by Weezer

from the album Van Weezer
- Released: May 6, 2020
- Recorded: 2020
- Genre: Power pop; hard rock
- Length: 3:57
- Label: Atlantic; Crush
- Songwriters: Rivers Cuomo; Daniel Bedingfield; Daniel Omelio; Denzel Baptiste; David Biral; Dave Bassett
- Producer: Suzy Shinn

Weezer singles chronology
"The End of the Game" (2019)	"Hero" (2020)	"All My Favorite Songs" (2021)

Music video
- "Hero" on YouTube

"Hero" is a song by the American rock band Weezer. It was released on May 6, 2020, as the second single from the band's fifteenth studio album, Van Weezer (2021). It became the fifth Weezer song to reach number one on the US Alternative Airplay chart.

== Composition ==
Rolling Stone described "Hero" as an outcast anthem, which focuses on frontman Rivers Cuomo's feelings of inadequacy. The band described the song as for "the stay at home dreamers, the zoom graduators, the sourdough bakers, and the essential workers". Following the style of Van Weezer's return to the band's roots in hard rock, "Hero" has been described musically as an upbeat Weezer song with heavy guitar usage. Spin described it as "a dose of power pop".

On July 30, the band released an alternate version of the song titled "Hero (Piano)", arranged as a piano ballad.

== Music video ==
The music video for the song was directed by Brendan Walter and Jasper Graham. It begins with a scene of Cuomo writing a letter, which is then seen passed along Weezer fans, accompanied with footage of the band performing the song. At the end of the video, the letter is opened to reveal a tribute to essential workers during the COVID-19 pandemic. The video includes a cameo from the band Real Estate.

== Charts ==
=== Weekly charts ===
Chart (2020)	Peak position
Belgium (Ultratip Bubbling Under Wallonia)	47
Canada Rock (Billboard)	2
US Alternative Airplay (Billboard)	1
US Hot Rock & Alternative Songs (Billboard)	17
US Mainstream Rock (Billboard)	19
US Rock & Alternative Airplay (Billboard)	1

=== Year-end charts ===
Chart (2020)	Position
US Alternative Songs (Billboard)	18
US Hot Rock & Alternative Songs (Billboard)	64
US Rock Airplay (Billboard)	19
