= Oh, Hush! =

American singer-songwriter

- Born: Christopher Sernel
- Origin: Los Angeles, California, United States
- Genres: Pop; rock; dance; electronic
- Occupations: Singer, record producer
- Instruments: Vocals; keyboard
- Years active: 2007–present
- Labels: Atlantic; Warner Chappell; Artist Publishing Group

Christopher Sernel, also known as Oh, Hush!, is an American recording artist and Grammy-nominated producer.

Early in his career, Sernel reveled in anonymity under the Oh, Hush! alias, not performing shows or giving interviews and relying heavily on word of mouth in contrast to usual music industry norms.

Shortly after the release of the debut The Yellow Album, Oh, Hush! was signed by Mike Caren of Artist Publishing Group.

Oh, Hush! has composed music for commercials for companies such as Dunkin' Donuts, Wal-Mart, and Nutella.

== Discography ==
=== Studio albums ===
- Oh, Hush! The Yellow Album (LP)
- Oh, Hush! Don’t Judge A Record By Its Covers (EP)
- Oh, Hush! Criminal (EP)
- Oh, Hush! The Purple (EP)
- Oh, Hush! Hush! The Herald Angels Sing (EP)
- Oh, Hush! The White Christmas Album (EP)
- Oh, Hush! Christmas Vacation (EP)

=== Cuts ===
Song	Artist/Album	Record label	Credits
"Friends Are Family"	Oh, Hush! Feat. Will Arnett – The Lego Batman Movie	WaterTower Music	Writer / Artist / Producer / Mixer
"Found My Place"	Oh, Hush! Feat. Jeff Lewis – The Lego Ninjago Movie	WaterTower Music	Writer / Artist / Producer / Mixer
"Happy Hour"	Weezer – Pacific Daydream	Atlantic Records	Writer / Producer - Awards: Top 10 Alternative Radio / Grammy Nomination
"What Part of Forever"	Cee Lo Green – Eclipse	Atlantic/Chop Shop	Writer / Producer – Awards: Grammy Nomination; Gold Record
"Tattoo"	Jason Derulo – Tattoos	Warner Bros	Writer
"Concrete"	Britt Nicole – #BrittNicole	Capitol Records	Writer / Producer
"Exhale"	Kenzie Ziegler x Sia – Single	Arista Records	Vocal Producer
"I Dare You"	Bea Miller – Not An Apology	Syco, Hollywood	Writer / Producer
"Magical Surprise"	Liu Yuning	Disney	Writer / Producer
"Can't Take Back The Bullet," "Smash Into You"	Hey Violet – I Can Feel It EP	Hi Or Hey Records, Capitol Records	Writer / Producer / Mixer
"Beautiful Life"	Cobra Starship - Single	Fueled By Ramen	Writer / Producer / Mixer
"I Love Myself For Hating You"	Diamante - Single	Eleven Seven Label Group	Writer
"Not Gonna Let You Walk Away" Tennessee Mix	Lolo – Single	Crush Music / Atlantic	Producer
"The Fruitful Darkness LP"	Trevor Hall - The Fruitful Darkness	Independent	Mixer
"Girl Like You"	Union J – You Got It All	Epic	Writer / Producer / Mixer
"See You Again"	Loreen – Heal	Warner Music Sweden	Writer - Award: SWE Platinum
"Infatuated"	Sweet California - "Break of Day"	Warner - Spain	Writer - Awards: #1 Album; Gold Record
"Faith Hope Love Repeat (radio mix)"	Brandon Heath - Faith Hope Love Repeat	Reunion	Producer / Mixer
"Stardust"	Family Force 5 - El Compadre	Word	Writer / Producer
"Just A Friend"	Jamie Grace - Ready to Fly	Gotee Records	Writer / Producer
"Wiser," "Hate You More," "Death of Me"	Madilyn Bailey - Wiser EP		Writer / Producer / Mixer
"People of A Second Chance," "On Again Off Again"	Group 1 Crew - Power	Word	Writer / Producer
"Upside Down"	Ross Lynch / Austin & Ally – Turn It Up (Soundtrack)	Disney	Mixer
"Me And You"	Laura Marano / Austin & Ally – Turn It Up (Soundtrack)	Disney	Mixer
"That's What I'm Talkin' Bout"	Kylie Cantrall	Disney	Mixer
"Feeling Some Kinda Way"	Kylie Cantrall	Disney	Mixer
"Better In Stereo"	Dove Cameron – Liv and Maddie Theme Song	Disney	Mixer
"Too Much"	Zendaya – Zapped Soundtrack	Disney	Mixer
"Start A Fire"	BP Rania – single	DR Music	Writer / Producer
"Intro", "Chasing Daylight", "Bittersweet Surrender", "Perfect Mistake", "Some Kind of Miracle", "A Way Out"	Makeshift Prodigy - Illuminate	Atlantic	Writer / Producer / Mixer
"World's Gonna End"	Megan & Liz – This Time	Collective Sounds	Writer / Producer / Mixer
"When You Were Mine"	Megan & Liz – Bad For Me EP	Collective Sounds	Writer / Producer / Mixer
"Be The Change", "Superstars"	Shuree – Be The Change EP	BEC Recordings	Writer / Producer / Mixer
"V.I.P.", "King of Mercy", "Good News"	Manic Drive - V.I.P.	Whiplash/BEMA	Writer / Producer / Mixer - Awards: Juno Award, #1 Christian Rock
"Lights Out"	Silverline - Lights Out	Dream Records / EMI	Writer – Awards: #1 Christian Rock

== Film placements ==
- The Lego Ninjago Movie (Warner Bros)
- The Lego Batman Movie (Warner Bros)
- The Twilight Saga: Eclipse (Summit)
- The Loud House Movie (Netflix)
- A Loud House Christmas (Nickelodeon)
- Blindspotting (Lions Gate)
- Marmaduke (20th Century Fox)
- Flicka: Country Pride (20th Century Fox)
- Where The Wild Things Are (Warner Bros)
- Yogi Bear 3D (Warner Bros)
- Same Time, Next Christmas (ABC)

== TV placements ==
- Legacies (The CW)
- Lucifer (Netflix)
- The Simpsons (Fox)
- American Idol (Fox)
- Pretty Little Liars (ABC Family)
- Selling Sunset (Netflix)
- Siesta Key (MTV)
- Love & Hip Hop (VH1)
- Baby Shark's Big Show! (Nickelodeon)
- The Voice (NBC)
- Ghost Whisperer (CBS)
- Ugly Betty (ABC)
- 90210 (CBS)
- BH90210 (Fox)
- Diary of a Future President (Disney)
- The Mindy Project (Fox)
- Revenge (ABC)
- Invisible Sister (Disney)
- Recovery Road (Freeform)
- The City (MTV)
- The Troop (Nickelodeon)
- Bring The Funny (NBC)
- Abby Hatcher, Fuzzly Catcher (Nickelodeon) - Theme Song
- Slime Time Live (Nickelodeon)
- Eurovision (BBC)
- Poo-Pourri "Imagine Where You Can Go" (AMP Award Winning)
- CBS Promos
- Fox Promos
- Dunkin' Donuts
- Sargento
- Ruby Tuesday
- Skechers
- Nutella
- Clorox
- Calvin Klein
- Sears
- WalMart
- Kohl's
- One-A-Day Vitamins
- Cox Internet and TV
- Five Below
- Snuggle
- Lululemon
- WWE
- Kentucky Derby
- NASCAR
- Green Bay Packers
- Univ. Texas Longhorns
- Baseball Hall of Fame
- Florida Gators
- Carolina Panthers

== Video game placements ==
- MLB 2K9 (MLB Sports)
- Xbox
