= Can't Knock the Hustle (Weezer song) =

Single by Weezer

from the album Weezer (The Black Album)
- Released: October 11, 2018
- Recorded: 2018
- Genre: Pop rock; funk rock; disco; rap rock
- Length: 3:42
- Label: Atlantic
- Songwriter: Rivers Cuomo
- Producer: Dave Sitek

Weezer singles chronology
"California Snow" (2018)	"Can't Knock the Hustle" (2018)	"Zombie Bastards" (2018)

Music video
- "Can't Knock the Hustle" on YouTube

"Can't Knock the Hustle" is a song by the American rock band Weezer, released on October 11, 2018, as the lead single for their 2019 self titled album, also called the Black Album. A music video was released on the same day.

== Composition ==
"Can't Knock the Hustle" was produced by Dave Sitek of TV on the Radio fame. The song contains influences from funk music and Latin music. It is described as a funk rock song by Stereogum and disco by Paste, while Beyond the Stage magazine categorizes it as pop rock and Rolling Stone as rap rock. It is also one of the only Weezer songs to use strong profanity.

== Music video ==
A music video was released for the song on October 11, 2018, and was produced by Jerry Media and directed by Guy Blelloch.

None of the band's members appear in the video, but Rivers Cuomo's glasses are worn by Fall Out Boy's Pete Wentz (known as Rivers Wentz in the video), who is driving the car. Wentz's character is repeatedly disrupted by two passengers in the back of the vehicle, played by James Ohliger and Romane Recalde, who are shown to be making out, and later, arguing and stabbing each other, ending with them being driven to the emergency room.

== Personnel ==
Personnel taken from Weezer liner notes.

Weezer

- Brian Bell
- Rivers Cuomo
- Scott Shriner
- Patrick Wilson

Additional musicians

- Money Mark – keyboards

Production

- David Andrew Sitek – producer, engineer
- Kool Kojak – additional production
- Liza Boldyreva – assistant engineer
- Matty Green – mixing
- Eric Boulanger – mastering
- Michael Beinhorn – pre/post production
- Jason Hiller – additional guitar engineering

== Charts ==
=== Weekly charts ===
Chart (2018)	Peak position
Czech Republic Modern Rock (IFPI)	19
Iceland (RÚV)	16
US Hot Rock & Alternative Songs (Billboard)	23

=== Year-end charts ===
Chart (2019)	Position
US Alternative Songs (Billboard)	36
