= The End of the Game (song) =

Single by Weezer

from the album Van Weezer
- Released: September 10, 2019
- Genre: Alternative rock; power pop; hard rock; pop metal
- Length: 3:01
- Label: Atlantic; Crush
- Songwriters: Rivers Cuomo; Tim Pagnotta
- Producer: Suzy Shinn

Weezer singles chronology
"Zombie Bastards" (2018)	"The End of the Game" (2019)	"Hero" (2020)

Music video
- "The End of the Game" on YouTube

"The End of the Game" is a song by the American rock band Weezer, released on September 10, 2019, as the first single from their fifteenth studio album, Van Weezer (2021). A music video for the song was released the same day, starring American rock band Cherry Glazerr, although they are not featured on the song. The band performed the song at Jimmy Kimmel Live! the same day the song was released.

== Composition ==
According to Weezer frontman Rivers Cuomo, "The End of the Game" contains at least 100 guitar overdubs. The song has been categorized as alternative rock, power pop, hard rock, and pop metal.

== Critical reception ==
The A.V. Club writer Gwen Ihnat wrote "for those who prefer their Weezer less mellow, more rocking, it's the band's best song in years". Ihnat added "If the rest of Van Weezer sounds as joyously rocking as this keg-stand soundtrack, it could make Pinkerton an even more distant memory (blasphemy, we know). This is the kind of music the sign of the devil was made for, so enjoy."

== Charts ==
=== Weekly charts ===
Chart (2019)	Peak position
Canada Rock (Billboard)	2
New Zealand Hot Singles (RMNZ)	36
US Hot Rock & Alternative Songs (Billboard)	9
US Mainstream Rock (Billboard)	19
US Rock & Alternative Airplay (Billboard)	3

=== Year-end charts ===
Chart (2019)	Position
US Hot Rock & Alternative Songs (Billboard)	83
Chart (2020)	Position
US Alternative Songs (Billboard)	39
US Hot Rock & Alternative Songs (Billboard)	92
US Rock Airplay (Billboard)	38
