= Record Player (song) =

2021 single by Daisy the Great and AJR

Single by Daisy the Great with AJR

from the album All You Need Is Time
- Released: August 31, 2021
- Genre: Pop, electropop
- Length: 2:29
- Label: S-Curve
- Songwriters: Kelley Dugan; Mina Walker; Jack Met; Adam Met; Ryan Met
- Producers: Jake Cheriff; Ryan Met

Daisy the Great singles chronology
"Persephone" (2021)	"Record Player" (2021)	"Glitter" (2021)

AJR singles chronology
"All My Favorite Songs" (2021)	"Record Player" (2021)	"The Good Part" (2021)

Animated music video
- "Record Player" on YouTube

Music video
- "Record Player" on YouTube

"Record Player" is a song by American pop bands Daisy the Great and AJR. It was released on August 31, 2021 via S-Curve Records as a single from the deluxe version of Daisy the Great's second studio album All You Need Is Time, and is a remix of "The Record Player Song" by Daisy the Great.

== Background ==
Daisy the Great released their debut single "The Record Player Song" on June 21, 2017. It later appeared on the EP I've Got a Few Friends & I Wish They Were Mine, released on January 19, 2018. The song was a sleeper hit, initially receiving little attention from critics, before becoming a trending song on TikTok in early 2021. AJR's lead singer Jack Met later discovered the song, calling the chorus "the catchiest thing [the band had] ever heard" and stating "we thought if we could team up with the artists behind that hook and build a new song using the existing hook as the basis, it could be something pretty special". AJR reached out to Daisy the Great to collaborate on a remix of "The Record Player Song", featuring two new verses and additional production from Ryan Met. The remix released on August 31, 2021 under the new name "Record Player", and has amassed 42 million streams on Spotify as of December 14, 2022. Similarly to the song it remixed, "Record Player" also became a trending song on TikTok.

== Music videos ==
Two official music videos were released for "Record Player". On August 31, 2021, an animated music video directed by Yuval Haker was released. A live action music video directed by Marysia Makowska was later released on November 18, 2021. Combined, the two videos have almost 11 million views as of Oct 2026.

== Live performances ==
During AJR's OK Orchestra Tour, Daisy the Great was featured as an opening act during the 2021 leg and performed "Record Player" midway through AJR's main setlist. On December 31, 2021 from 8:50 to 8:52 PM EST, AJR and Daisy the Great co-performed "Record Player" during Dick Clark's New Year's Rockin' Eve.

== Personnel ==
Credits adapted from Tidal.

- Kelley Dugan – lead vocals, instruments, composer
- Mina Walker – lead vocals, instruments, composer
- Adam Met – backing vocals, instruments, composer
- Jack Met – lead vocals, instruments, composer
- Ryan Met – backing vocals, instruments, composer, producer
- Jake Cheriff – producer, audio mixing
- Joe Zook – audio mixing

== Charts ==
"Record Player" peaked at number 20 on the Billboard Hot Alternative Songs chart, number 11 on the Billboard Alternative Digital Song Sales chart, and number 21 on the Billboard Hot Rock Songs chart in the week ending January 15, 2022.

=== Weekly charts ===
Weekly chart performance for "Record Player"
Chart (2021–2022)	Peak position
Canada Rock (Billboard)	44
US Adult Alternative Airplay (Billboard)	24
US Adult Pop Airplay (Billboard)	36
US Alternative Airplay (Billboard)	6
US Hot Rock & Alternative Songs (Billboard)	21
US Pop Airplay (Billboard)	39
US Rock & Alternative Airplay (Billboard)	16

=== Year-end charts ===
Year-end chart performance for "Record Player"
Chart (2022)	Position
US Hot Rock & Alternative Songs (Billboard)	67
US Alternative Airplay (Billboard)	32

== Certifications ==
Certifications for "Record Player"
Region	Certification	Certified units/sales
Canada (Music Canada)	Gold	40,000^{‡}
United States (RIAA)	Gold	500,000^{‡}
^{‡} Sales+streaming figures based on certification alone.
