= Erik Ralske =

American classical horn player

Erik Ralske is an American classical horn player. He has been principal horn of the Metropolitan Opera Orchestra since 2010, following seventeen seasons as third horn of the New York Philharmonic. He was featured horn soloist of the MET's production of Wagner's Ring Cycle, and was a soloist on several occasions with the New York Philharmonic. He is also a member of the orchestra's Philharmonic Quintet of New York.

Ralske, a native of Long Island, New York, studied at the Juilliard School where he received his Bachelor of Music Degree in 1980 and his Master of Music in 1982. Prior to joining the New York Philharmonic in 1993, he was associate principal of the Houston Symphony as well as principal of the Vancouver Symphony, Florida Symphony Orchestra, and Tulsa Philharmonic. In July 2010 he was offered two principal horn positions in the same week—with the Metropolitan Opera Orchestra and the Los Angeles Philharmonic. He opted to remain in New York and took up his appointment with the Met at the start of the 2010/2011 season.

He has been a member of the faculty at the Juilliard School since 2012 and also teaches at Mannes College The New School for Music, and the Manhattan School of Music.

== Recordings ==
Ralske's recordings as solo or principal horn include:

- Moravec: Cool Fire. Naxos Records 8559393
- Take 9 (American Horn Quartet, New York Philharmonic Horns). MSR Classics 1089
- Audra McDonald: Build A Bridge. Nonesuch Records 79862
