= The Twilight Saga: Eclipse =

2010 film by David Slade

- Theatrical release poster
- Directed by: David Slade
- Screenplay by: Melissa Rosenberg
- Based on: Eclipse by Stephenie Meyer
- Produced by: Wyck Godfrey; Karen Rosenfelt
- Starring: Kristen Stewart; Robert Pattinson; Taylor Lautner; Bryce Dallas Howard; Billy Burke; Dakota Fanning
- Cinematography: Javier Aguirresarobe
- Edited by: Art Jones; Nancy Richardson
- Music by: Howard Shore
- Production companies: Temple Hill Entertainment; Maverick Films/Imprint Entertainment; Sunswept Entertainment
- Distributed by: Summit Entertainment
- Release dates: June 24, 2010 (Nokia Theatre); June 30, 2010 (United States)
- Running time: 124 minutes
- Country: United States
- Language: English
- Budget: $68 million
- Box office: $699 million

The Twilight Saga: Eclipse is a 2010 American romantic fantasy film directed by David Slade from a screenplay by Melissa Rosenberg, based on the 2007 novel Eclipse by Stephenie Meyer. It is the sequel to The Twilight Saga: New Moon (2009) and the third installment of The Twilight Saga film series. The film stars Kristen Stewart, Robert Pattinson, and Taylor Lautner, reprising their roles as Bella Swan, Edward Cullen, and Jacob Black, respectively. Bryce Dallas Howard joins the cast as returning character Victoria, who was previously portrayed by Rachelle Lefevre in the first two films. In the film, Bella further explores her relationships with both Jacob and Edward as the threat of an army of newborn vampires looms over the possibility of an alliance being formed between werewolves and vampires.

Summit Entertainment announced it had greenlit the film on February 20, 2009. Principal photography began on August 17, in Vancouver, British Columbia, Canada, and finished on October 31, with post-production beginning early the following month.

The Twilight Saga: Eclipse premiered at the Nokia Theatre in Los Angeles, California on June 24, 2010, and was theatrically released in the United States on June 30, by Summit Entertainment. It became the first The Twilight Saga film to be released in IMAX. The film received mixed reviews from critics and grossed $699 million worldwide, becoming the sixth-highest-grossing film of 2010. Critics praised the action sequences, visual effects, Dallas Howard's performance, and Shore's musical score, but criticized its pacing, most of the other performances, and the screenplay. It held the record for biggest midnight opening in the United States and Canada, grossing $30.1 million, beating The Twilight Saga: New Moon until it was surpassed by Harry Potter and the Deathly Hallows – Part 2 (2011). The film then scored the biggest Wednesday opening in the United States and Canada with $68.5 million, beating Transformers: Revenge of the Fallen (2009). The Twilight Saga: Eclipse has also become the film with the widest independent release, beating The Twilight Saga: New Moon, and the widest domestic release, playing in 4,416 theaters, beating Iron Man 2, which released the same year until it was surpassed by Despicable Me 2 (2013).

The film was followed by two sequels, The Twilight Saga: Breaking Dawn – Part 1 (2011) and Part 2 (2012), which conclude the series.

== Plot ==
In Seattle, Washington, the vampire Victoria Sutherland attacks the human Riley Biers, turning him into a vampire. Thus she begins creating an army of newborn vampires to help her get revenge on Edward Cullen, who killed her lover James Witherdale.

In Forks, Edward and his human girlfriend Bella Swan discuss her desire to be turned into a vampire, but Edward wants her to stay human. He asks her to marry him, but she is reluctant, even after Edward promises to turn her into a vampire if she agrees. Bella talks with her father, Charlie, who decides to lift Bella’s house arrest if she promises to spend more time with her other friends and Jacob Black, her childhood friend and a werewolf with a strong dislike for vampires and Edward.

Edward's clairvoyant sister, Alice Cullen, foresees the newborn vampire army, led by Riley, attacking Forks. Edward's family chase Victoria through the forest, but she escapes into werewolf territory, causing an incident between the vampires and the werewolves that flares up tensions between them. Edward decides to keep all this a secret from Bella.

At school, Edward and Jacob have a tense meeting, where Jacob reveals the incident to Bella. She is upset with Edward for keeping things from her, so she leaves with Jacob, and starts spending more time with him and his tribe. Jacob eventually confesses his love to her. She tells him she is in love with Edward, but he refuses to believe it, and kisses her. She angrily punches him, but hurts her hand on his hard werewolf body. Later, Jacob apologizes for his behavior, and Bella forgives him.

The Cullens forge an uneasy alliance with the werewolf tribe to defend against Victoria's oncoming attack, and train together. During the training, Alice's partner, Jasper Hale, tells Bella that he was once part of a newborn army and hated himself, but eventually experienced happiness once he fell in love with Alice.

Bella and Edward spend the night alone in his family home and, afraid how her feelings will change after being turned into a vampire, she agrees to marry him if he agrees to have sex with her. The two make out, but Edward finds it too dangerous, and explains that he wants to wait until marriage, after which he shows Bella his mother's ring and asks her to marry him, and she says yes.

They use Bella's blood to bait the newborn vampire army, and Edward and Bella camp in the mountains away from the fight to keep her safe. They discuss their engagement, which Jacob overhears, after which he storms off. Bella chases Jacob and desperately asks him to kiss her, which he does. Bella explains to Edward that although she loves Jacob, her love for Edward is stronger.

They get interrupted when Victoria and her army attack. The Cullen family together with the werewolves fend off the attack, with Edward killing Victoria, but Jacob gets badly injured during the fight. After the werewolves carry Jacob to safety, the Volturi guard, who carry out vampire laws, arrive and find the Cullens guarding Bree Tanner, one of the newborns whom Victoria created, who surrendered.

The Volturi torture and interrogate Bree, despite the Cullens' protests. When the Volturi note that Bella is still human, against their agreement, she explains the date for her transformation has been set. The leader of the Volturi guard sends one of her subordinates to kill Bree, with the Cullens too afraid to intervene. Afterwards, Bella visits the injured Jacob to tell him she has chosen to be with Edward, and he reluctantly accepts her decision.

Bella and Edward discuss their upcoming wedding in their meadow. Edward questions why she is doing this, and Bella explains that she feels more herself in Edward's world and wants to be connected to him, and they plan to reveal their engagement to Bella's father.

== Cast ==
- Kristen Stewart as Bella Swan:
  An 18-year-old who finds herself surrounded by danger and targeted by the vengeful vampire Victoria. In the meantime, she must choose between her love for vampire Edward Cullen and her friendship with werewolf Jacob Black. Edward had proposed to Bella in the previous film and she says "yes" in this film, ultimately choosing him over Jacob.
- Robert Pattinson as Edward Cullen:
  Bella's vampire boyfriend who is capable of reading minds, except for Bella's. In New Moon, Edward left Bella, and now he has returned to try to stay a part of her life. Edward had proposed to Bella in the previous film and she says "yes" in this film.
- Taylor Lautner as Jacob Black:
  A werewolf in whom Bella found solace during Edward's absence in New Moon. Now, Edward has returned to Bella's life permanently, and Jacob is looking for ways to prove that he is a better choice for her. He is heartbroken and furious when he finds out Bella is marrying Edward but is unable to do anything to stop her.
- Bryce Dallas Howard as Victoria Sutherland: A vengeful vampire who wants to kill Bella to avenge her mate, James Witherdale, whom she supposes to be killed by Edward in the first Twilight film. She meets her end at the hands of Edward when Bella cuts herself on purpose to distract her.
- Billy Burke as Charlie Swan: Bella's father and Forks's Chief of Police. Burke admits he has not read the Twilight books, saying, "We can't make the book, we're making the movie", and that he works from the scripts.
- Dakota Fanning as Jane: A loyal servant to the Volturi and Alec's twin sister.
- Peter Facinelli as Carlisle Cullen:
  A compassionate doctor who acts as a father figure to the Cullen coven. He turned each member of the Cullen family into vampires other than Alice (who was turned by an unknown vampire) and Jasper (who was turned by a Spanish vampire and his former love, Maria).
- Elizabeth Reaser as Esme Cullen: A loving mother figure to the Cullen coven and the wife of Carlisle.
- Jackson Rathbone as Jasper Hale:
  A Civil War fighter who was turned into a vampire to train newborns. He's also a member of the Cullen coven who trains his family to fight newborn vampires and can feel, control, and manipulate emotions.
- Kellan Lutz as Emmett Cullen: The strongest member of the Cullen family, who provides comic relief.
- Ashley Greene as Alice Cullen:
  A member of the Cullen family who can see "subjective" visions of the future and who is close friends with Bella. Being Jasper's mate, she helps him control his thirst for blood and is also the reason why he stays with the Cullen family. Alice's vision of the Seattle army helped the Cullen coven ally themselves with the Quileute pack and come up with a plan to protect Bella from Victoria.
- Nikki Reed as Rosalie Hale:
  One of the most beautiful vampires in the world, according to Bella. She was raped by her fiancé and left to die before she became a vampire. She also feels that Bella is making a mistake for choosing to live the life of a vampire before she could live a full human life.
- Anna Kendrick as Jessica Stanley: One of Bella's friends in Forks.
- Michael Welch as Mike Newton: One of Bella's friends in Forks. Mike has a crush on Bella, and does not like Edward.
- Justin Chon as Eric Yorkie: Bella's friend and Angela's boyfriend.
- Christian Serratos as Angela Weber: Bella's shy but caring friend.
- Xavier Samuel as Riley Biers: The one Victoria changed to help her form an army of newborn vampires.
- Sarah Clarke as Renée Dwyer: Bella's mother who lives in Jacksonville, Florida, with her husband Phil.
- Gil Birmingham as Billy Black: A Quileute elder and Jacob's physically disabled father.
- Kiowa Gordon as Embry Call
- Tyson Houseman as Quil Ateara
- Bronson Pelletier as Jared Cameron
- Alex Meraz as Paul Lahote
- Julia Jones as Leah Clearwater: Seth's older sister and the only female werewolf in existence.
- Tinsel Korey as Emily Young: Sam's imprinted fiancée whom he once hurt unintentionally.
- Chaske Spencer as Sam Uley: Alpha of the Wolf Pack.
- Booboo Stewart as Seth Clearwater: Leah's younger brother and Jacob's friend.
- Jodelle Ferland as Bree Tanner: A newborn vampire created to fight the Cullens, in the newborn army. She is executed by the Volturi at the end of the film.
- Jack Huston as Royce King II: Rosalie's ex-fiancé who drunkenly beat her, resulting in Rosalie's transformation, which led her to kill him afterwards.
- Daniel Cudmore as Felix: A loyal servant to the Volturi who is one of their guards. He executes Bree Tanner at the end of the film.
- Cameron Bright as Alec: A loyal servant to the Volturi and Jane's twin brother.
- Charlie Bewley as Demetri: A Volturi guard who is a gifted tracker.
- Catalina Sandino Moreno as Maria (uncredited): The one that turns Jasper into a vampire.

== Production ==
=== Development ===
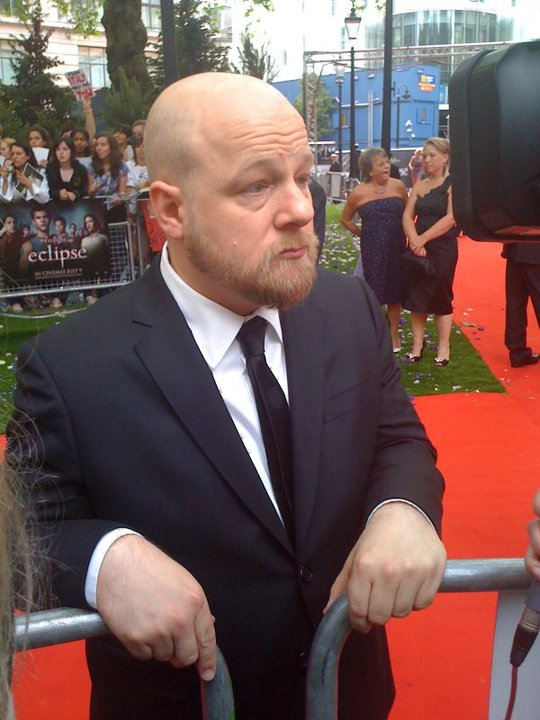
Director David Slade at the London premiere of The Twilight Saga: Eclipse

In early November 2008, Summit Entertainment obtained the film adaptation rights to the remaining novels in the Twilight book series, New Moon, Eclipse, and Breaking Dawn. On February 20, 2009, Summit confirmed that they would begin working on The Twilight Saga: Eclipse. On the same day, it was announced that since The Twilight Saga: New Moon director Chris Weitz would be in post-production for New Moon when Eclipse began shooting, he would not be directing the third film. Instead, the film would be helmed by director David Slade. David Slade dove right into the project, interviewing cast members individually two to three times to discuss characters and the plot.

=== Casting ===
Summit Entertainment revealed that they would replace Rachelle Lefevre, who played an evil vampire named Victoria, with Bryce Dallas Howard in late July 2009. They attributed the change to scheduling conflicts, and Lefevre responded by saying she was "stunned" and "greatly saddened" by the decision. Howard had previously rejected the role of Victoria as "too small of a part" when she was approached to play her in Twilight.

Silent Hill's Jodelle Ferland was cast as the newly turned vampire, Bree Tanner. Other new cast members include Xavier Samuel as Riley, Jack Huston as Royce King II, Catalina Sandino Moreno as Maria, Julia Jones as Leah Clearwater, and Booboo Stewart as Seth Clearwater.

Actors who auditioned for the various roles were not given a script to work from. Instead, actress Kirsten Prout mentioned, "they made the scenes exact transcripts from the book.... They didn't give the screenplay out. So, the audition side was just reading a page of Twilight and reading the lines that were interspersed between the descriptions."

=== Filming and post-production ===
Principal photography for Eclipse began on August 17, 2009, at Vancouver Film Studios. On August 29, photos captured Kristen Stewart, Billy Burke, and other principal actors, filming a scene with graduation caps and gowns. September 2 brought Xavier Samuel together with Stewart and Robert Pattinson filming at a soundstage for scenes at Bella's house. Director David Slade stated that they filmed a scene with a tent on September 13. He also said that they filmed a kiss between Jacob and Bella on September 17. Filming wrapped up on October 29, 2009, while post-production began in late November. Slade published multiple updates on his Twitter account proclaiming that editing was going well. He said the "story and the way [they] approached the film calls for a more realistic approach." In April 2010, it was revealed that reshoots to the film were needed. Both Slade and Stephenie Meyer were present at the shoot along with the three main stars.

In January 2010, an early draft of the film's script was leaked on the Internet. The script presumably belonged to star Jackson Rathbone, as his name was watermarked across each page.

=== Music ===
The score for The Twilight Saga: Eclipse was composed by Howard Shore, who composed the scores for such films as The Lord of the Rings trilogy and The Aviator. The film's soundtrack was released on June 8, 2010, by Atlantic Records in conjunction with music supervisor Alexandra Patsavas' Chop Shop label. The lead single from the soundtrack is "Neutron Star Collision (Love Is Forever)", performed by the British band Muse.

On May 11, 2010, MySpace announced that the full Eclipse soundtrack listing would be unveiled starting at 8 a.m. the following morning every half-hour, totaling six hours. The album debuted at #2 on Billboard 200.

=== Visual effects ===
The scene where Taylor Lautner himself played the wolf, in contrast to other scenes that were simply animated. The left frame is the unedited footage, with the right frame showing the CGI that was added

As in the previous film, Eclipse used CGI animation to depict the wolf pack when they were transformed into wolves. Mostly, the wolves were simply animated, although in one scene with Jacob and Bella, Taylor Lautner himself played the wolf, with him wearing a gray suit which was reportedly "so his skin tone wouldn't bounce back onto Stewart and create lighting issues"; the visual effects of the wolf was later edited onto Lautner.

== Distribution ==
=== Marketing ===
On November 5, 2009, the American Film Market revealed the first poster for Eclipse. In late February 2010, Summit Entertainment announced that the first trailer would be attached to the studio's own film Remember Me, which also stars Robert Pattinson. On March 10, 2010, a 10-second preview of the trailer was released online, followed by the release of the full trailer the next day. The trailer's release coincided with the launching of the film's official website. On March 19, 2010, The Twilight Saga: New Moon was released on DVD and Blu-ray; the Walmart Ultimate Fan Edition includes a 7-minute first look at Eclipse. On March 23, the second poster for the film was released. The final Eclipse trailer debuted on The Oprah Winfrey Show, and in promotion for the movie, Robert Pattinson, Kristen Stewart, Taylor Lautner, and Dakota Fanning made a guest appearance on the show May 13; the audience also viewed a version of the film. On June 6, 2010, a sneak peek of the film was shown at the 2010 MTV Movie Awards; that same week, more clips and TV spots were released also.

In order to tie in the lunar eclipse on June 26, 2010, Summit Entertainment hosted screenings of the first two films in The Twilight Saga film series in twelve cities throughout the United States. The event was streamed live from Philadelphia and San Diego, and included cast member appearances and special previews of Eclipse.

Nordstrom and Summit Entertainment joined together to sell a fashion collection inspired by the film, as was done for the previous installment. Created by Awake Inc., the collection was based on Ashley Greene's character, Alice, and Kristen Stewart's character, Bella. The Eclipse collection became available on June 4, 2010. In a similar style to its New Moon marketing, Burger King started promoting the film on Monday, June 21, 2010. Their promotion heavily focuses on the "Team Jacob vs. Team Edward" aspect of the film.

=== Release ===
Tickets for Eclipse went on sale on various online movie ticket sellers on Friday, May 14, 2010. The official red carpet premiere for the film was held on June 24, 2010, at the Nokia Plaza in Los Angeles. An official United Kingdom premiere was held in Leicester Square, London on July 1, 2010. However, Kristen Stewart, Robert Pattinson and Taylor Lautner were not present.

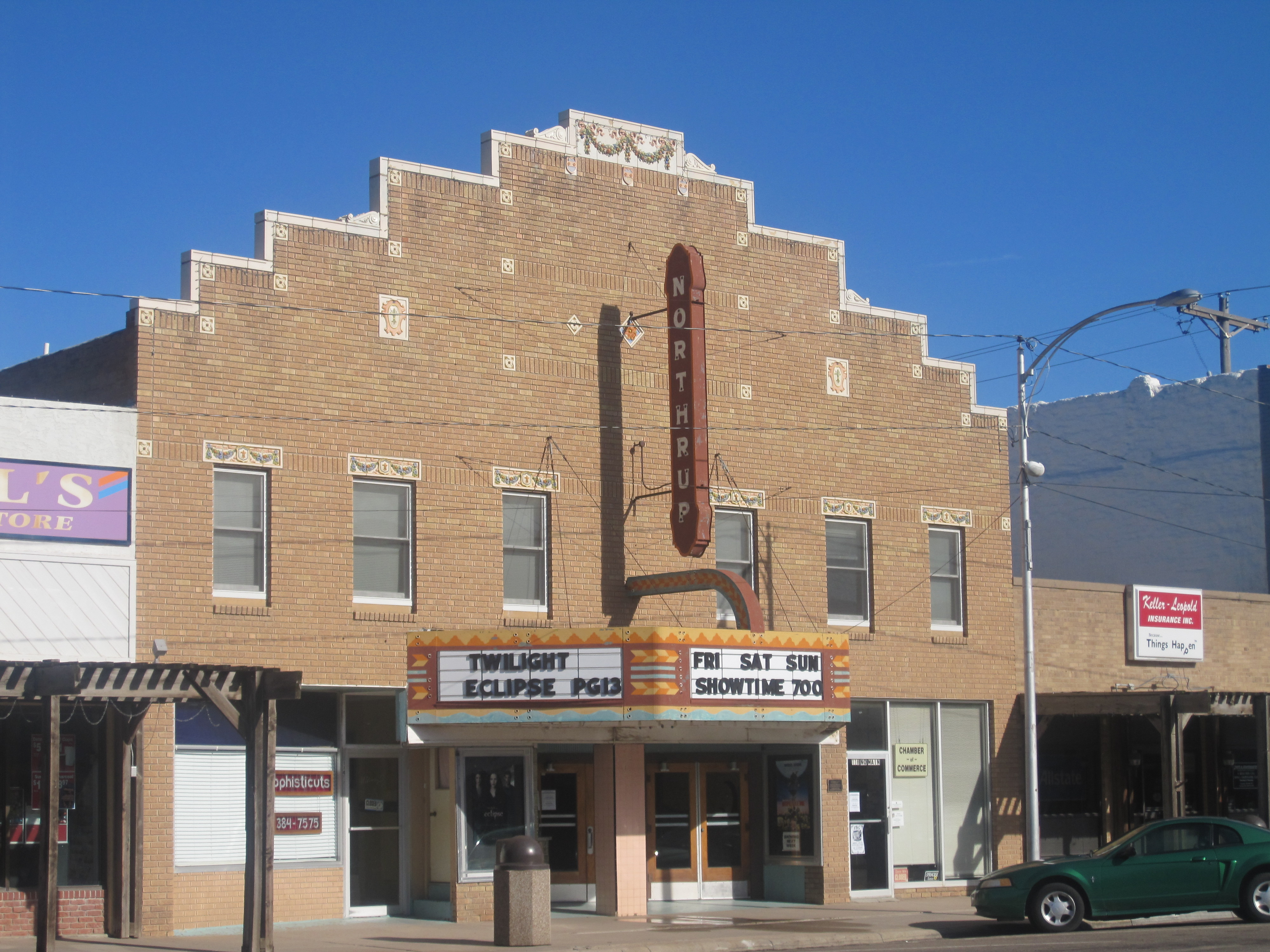
Eclipse on the marquee of the Northrup Theater (Syracuse, Kansas) in August 2010.

Eclipse opened in 4,416 theaters and 193 IMAX screens. With that, early predictions forecasted the film will gross anywhere from $150 million to $180 million within its first six days of release, putting the record set by The Twilight Saga: New Moon's in danger of being broken. Eclipse accounted for 82 percent of Fandango's online ticket sales, reaching the top five on May 14, 2010. MovieTickets.com stated that Eclipse was the top advance ticket seller on its site, with more than 50 percent of daily ticket sales. The film was the top advance ticket seller as of June 2010. Early ticket sales for the film also have broken records for Gold Class Cinemas, where more than 8,500 Twilight fans have reserved tickets; the Fairview, TX location sold out their showings of Eclipse for June 30.

The film was re-released into theaters on September 13, 2010, in recognition of lead character Bella Swan's birthday.

=== Home media ===
The Twilight Saga: Eclipse was released on DVD in the United States on December 4, 2010. The Two Disc Special Edition DVD and Blu-ray discs include special features such as: eight deleted and extended scenes, music videos by Muse and Metric from The Twilight Saga: Eclipse: Original Motion Picture Soundtrack and commentaries by Kristen Stewart and Robert Pattinson, Stephenie Meyer and Wyck Geoffery. It was released on December 1, 2010, in New Zealand and Australia. There is also a "gift set" Two-Disc Collector's Edition which features a unique packaging and 6 collectible photo cards. In North American DVD sales, the film has currently grossed $164,676,695 and has sold more than 9,424,505 units.

== Reception ==
=== Box office ===
Eclipse set a new record for the biggest midnight opening in the United States and Canada in box office history, grossing $30.1 million in over 4,000 theaters. The record was formerly held by the previous film, The Twilight Saga: New Moon, with $26.3 million in 3,514 theaters. It held the record until the summer of 2011, when it was broken by Harry Potter and the Deathly Hallows – Part 2, which made $43.5 million. Eclipse also had the highest midnight gross of The Twilight Saga film series until it was topped in November 2011 by its successor, The Twilight Saga: Breaking Dawn - Part 1 ($30.3 million). The movie also surpassed Transformers: Revenge of the Fallen in total grosses for a midnight screening in IMAX. Eclipse garnered more than $1 million at 192 theaters, while Revenge of the Fallen earned $959,000, until it was beaten five months later by Harry Potter and the Deathly Hallows – Part 1 with $1.4 million. The film grossed $68.5 million on its opening day in the United States and Canada, becoming the biggest single-day Wednesday opening over Revenge of the Fallen's $62 million, and the third biggest single-day opening ever at the time. As of 2011, the film has the third-highest opening-day gross of the series behind New Moon ($72.7 million) and Breaking Dawn - Part 1 ($72.0 million). Furthermore, the film earned $9 million at various IMAX locations during its first week.

After six days of release in the United States and Canada, the film ended Independence Day with a total of $176.4 million, including $64.8 million during its first weekend. In its second weekend, the film fell 51%, a better standing than its predecessors, grossing an estimated $31.7 million.

The film opened overseas with $16.2 million, beating records set by the film's predecessor in Russia with an estimated $3.9 million (since surpassed by Pirates of the Caribbean: On Stranger Tides which earned $5 million), in Italy with an estimated $3.1 million, in the Philippines, grossing $1.2 million, and in Belgium, where it grossed an estimated $1.1 million. It is the third-best opening day ever in Italy; in the Philippines, Eclipse topped Spider-Man 3 for best opening day ever, and was the highest opening day ever in Belgium. In three days, Eclipse topped the box office with $121.3 million and during its first weekend it earned $71.3 million.

Overseas in its second weekend, the film grossed $70.6 million from 9,440 screens in 63 markets, a 1% drop from its first weekend. The film opened in the United Kingdom at number one, grossing $20.7 million from 523 locations (including previews), the market's biggest opening of 2010 (until Toy Story 3 surpassed it) and about $1.7 million more than The Twilight Saga: New Moon grossed in its opening weekend in November 2009. The film also debuted at number one in France, grossing $13.3 million, which marks the third-largest opening in the country for a 2010 film (behind Harry Potter and the Deathly Hallows – Part 1's ($20.7 million) and Alice in Wonderland's ($15.4 million). The film opened at number one in South Korea with $4.9 million.

The film ended its box-office run in the US and Canada on October 21, 2010, having grossed $301 million, surpassing its predecessor The Twilight Saga: New Moon, which grossed $296.6 million a few months before, to become the highest-grossing film of the franchise and the highest-grossing romantic fantasy, werewolf and vampire film of all time at the American and Canadian box office. It is the fourth movie of 2010 to reach $300 million and ranks 46th on the all-time chart in the US and Canada. Compared to its predecessor overseas, it has grossed $393 million against New Moon's $413.2 million. Therefore, internationally, Eclipse remains the second-highest-grossing film in the franchise with $693.6 million against New Moon's $710 million. Eclipse's highest-grossing markets except the US and Canada are the UK, Ireland and Malta ($45.7 million), Germany ($33.1 million), France and the Maghreb region ($33 million), Italy ($20 million), Brazil ($30.5 million) and Australia ($28.6 million).

=== Critical response ===
Review aggregation website Rotten Tomatoes gives the film an approval rating of 46% based on 256 reviews and a rating average of 5.4/10. The site's general consensus is that, "Stuffed with characters and overly reliant on uninspired dialogue, Eclipse won't win The Twilight Saga many new converts, despite an improved blend of romance and action fantasy." Metacritic, another review aggregator, rated it a weighted average of 58/100 based on 38 reviews, indicating "mixed or average reviews".

The Hollywood Reporter said the film "nails it". Peter Debruge of Variety said that the film "finally feels more like the blockbuster this top-earning franchise deserves". Rick Bentley of McClatchy Newspapers said the film was the best in The Twilight Saga so far, suggesting that, "The person who should be worried is Bill Condon, the director tapped for the two-part finale, Breaking Dawn. He's got a real challenge to make movies as good as Eclipse." The New York Times praised David Slade's ability to make an entertaining film, calling it funny and better than its predecessors, but wrote that the acting has not improved much. Giving the film 4.5 out of 5 stars, Betsey Sharkey from the Los Angeles Times praised David Slade's method of blending his previous works to form a funny movie. She stated, "Eclipse eclipse[s] its predecessors." The film was also listed in 49th place by Moviefone on its list of the 50 best movies of 2010.

Roger Moore of the Orlando Sentinel, who gave the film 2.5 out of 4 stars, said, "The dullness of the performances really stands out when somebody like Bryce Dallas Howard, or Anna Kendrick turn up and liven up their scenes." While calling the film "too chatty and too long", he did compliment David Slade's directing and noted that the movie will please the fans. Michael Phillips of the Chicago Tribune gave the film 2 out of 5 stars, stating that David Slade's pacing is "everything like molasses running uphill". He also criticized the characters, the actors portraying them, the big close-ups of hand-held devices, and called Howard Shore's score "gunk". Wesley Morris from the Boston Globe said, "If the first two movies were "get a room," part three is "get a therapist". He said the second and third film "repeat that discovery [in Twilight] without truly deepening it...the movies are interesting without ever being good."

Geoff Berkshire of Metromix said that while "Eclipse restores some of the energy New Moon zapped out of the franchise and has enough quality performances to keep it involving", the film "isn't quite the adrenaline-charged game-changer for love story haters that its marketing might lead you to believe. The majority of the 'action' remains protracted and not especially scintillating should-we-or-shouldn't-we conversations between the central triangle." Roger Ebert of the Chicago Sun Times gave the film a more positive review than for the first two films in the saga, but still felt the movie was a constant, unclever conversation between the three main characters. He criticized the "gazes" both Edward and Jacob give Bella throughout the film and said audiences unfamiliar with the saga would understand the opening or closing scenes. He gave the film 2 stars out of 4. Steve Persall of the St. Peterburg Times rated the film C− and called it "just monstrously bad". He said, "Eclipse leaves the sputtering story arc in idle, with only an uneasy truce between the vampire and werewolf clans amounting to anything new". The Guardian's columnist Peter Bradshaw gave the film a one-star rating in a review that lampooned Bella's continued abstinence, among other plot elements. Bradshaw, dubbing the series "The epic of the unbroken duck", wrote that "Bella Swan is starting to make Doris Day look like the nympho from hell", and concluded that "it could be time to sharpen the wooden stake."

=== Accolades ===
Year	Ceremony	Award	Result
2010	National Movie Awards	Most Anticipated Movie Of The Summer	Won
2010	Teen Choice Awards	Choice Summer Movie	Won
2010	Teen Choice Awards	Choice Summer Movie Star: Female (Kristen Stewart)	Won
2010	Teen Choice Awards	Choice Summer Movie Star: Male (Robert Pattinson)	Won
2010	Teen Choice Awards	Choice Summer Movie Star: Male (Taylor Lautner)	Nominated
2010	Teen Choice Awards	Choice Music: Love Song (Neutron Star Collision (Love Is Forever))	Nominated
2010	Scream Awards	The Ultimate Scream	Nominated
2010	Scream Awards	Best Fantasy Movie	Won
2010	Scream Awards	Best Fantasy Actress: Kristen Stewart	Won
2010	Scream Awards	Best Fantasy Actor: Robert Pattinson	Won
2010	Scream Awards	Best Fantasy Actor: Taylor Lautner	Nominated
2010	Scream Awards	Best Breakthrough Performance - Male: Xavier Samuel	Nominated
2010	Nickelodeon Australian Kids' Choice Awards 2010	Favourite Movie	Won
2010	Nickelodeon Australian Kids' Choice Awards 2010	Favorite Movie Star: Kristen Stewart	Nominated
2010	Nickelodeon Australian Kids' Choice Awards 2010	Favorite Movie Star: Robert Pattinson	Nominated
2010	Nickelodeon Australian Kids' Choice Awards 2010	Favorite Movie Star: Xavier Samuel	Nominated
2010	Nickelodeon Australian Kids' Choice Awards 2010	Hottest Hottie: Taylor Lautner	Nominated
2010	Nickelodeon Australian Kids' Choice Awards 2010	Fave Kiss: Kristen Stewart & Robert Pattinson	Nominated
2010	Nickelodeon Australian Kids' Choice Awards 2010	Fave Kiss: Kristen Stewart & Taylor Lautner	Nominated
2010	Brazilian Kids' Choice Awards 2010	Couple of the Year : Kristen Stewart & Robert Pattinson	Won
2010	American Music Awards	Favorite Soundtrack	Nominated
2010	Satellite Awards	Best Original Song: Eclipse (All Yours)	Nominated
2010	Satellite Awards	Best Original Song: What Part of Forever	Nominated
2011	People's Choice Awards	Favorite Movie	Won
2011	People's Choice Awards	Favorite Drama Movie	Won
2011	People's Choice Awards	Favorite Movie Actress: Kristen Stewart	Won
2011	People's Choice Awards	Favorite Movie Actor: Robert Pattinson	Nominated
2011	People's Choice Awards	Favorite Movie Actor: Taylor Lautner	Nominated
2011	People's Choice Awards	Favorite On-Screen Team: Kristen Stewart, Robert Pattinson and Taylor Lautner	Won
2011	Grammy Awards	Best Compilation Soundtrack Album for a Motion Picture, Television, or Other Visual Media	Nominated
2011	Golden Raspberry Awards	Worst Picture	Nominated
2011	Golden Raspberry Awards	Worst Director: David Slade	Nominated
2011	Golden Raspberry Awards	Worst Actor: Taylor Lautner	Nominated
2011	Golden Raspberry Awards	Worst Actor: Robert Pattinson	Nominated
2011	Golden Raspberry Awards	Worst Actress: Kristen Stewart	Nominated
2011	Golden Raspberry Awards	Worst Screenplay: Melissa Rosenberg	Nominated
2011	Golden Raspberry Awards	Worst Prequel, Remake, Rip-Off or Sequel	Nominated
2011	Golden Raspberry Awards	Worst Screen Ensemble	Nominated
2011	Golden Raspberry Awards	Worst Supporting Actor: Jackson Rathbone	Won
2011	Kids' Choice Awards	Favorite Movie Actress: Kristen Stewart	Nominated
2011	MTV Movie Awards	Best Movie	Won
2011	MTV Movie Awards	Best Female Performance: Kristen Stewart	Won
2011	MTV Movie Awards	Best Male Performance: Robert Pattinson	Won
2011	MTV Movie Awards	Best Male Performance: Taylor Lautner	Nominated
2011	MTV Movie Awards	Best Breakout Star: Xavier Samuel	Nominated
2011	MTV Movie Awards	Best Fight: Robert Pattinson, Bryce Dallas Howard and Xavier Samuel	Won
2011	MTV Movie Awards	Best Kiss: Kristen Stewart & Robert Pattinson	Won
2011	MTV Movie Awards	Best Kiss: Kristen Stewart & Taylor Lautner	Nominated
2011	37th Saturn Awards	Best Fantasy Film	Nominated
2011	Teen Choice Awards	Choice Movie: Sci-Fi/Fantasy	Nominated
2011	Teen Choice Awards	Choice Movie Actress: Sci-Fi/Fantasy (Kristen Stewart)	Nominated
2011	Teen Choice Awards	Choice Movie Actor: Sci-Fi/Fantasy (Robert Pattinson)	Nominated
2011	Teen Choice Awards	Choice Movie Actor: Sci-Fi/Fantasy (Taylor Lautner)	Won
2011	Teen Choice Awards	Choice Movie: Villain (Bryce Dallas Howard)	Nominated
2011	Teen Choice Awards	Choice Movie: Male Scene Stealer (Kellan Lutz)	Won
2011	Teen Choice Awards	Choice Movie: Female Scene Stealer (Ashley Greene)	Won
2011	Teen Choice Awards	Choice Movie: Liplock (Kristen Stewart & Robert Pattinson)	Nominated
2011	Teen Choice Awards	Choice Movie: Liplock (Kristen Stewart & Taylor Lautner)	Nominated
2011	Teen Choice Awards	Choice Movie: Male Breakout Star (Xavier Samuel)	Nominated
2011	Teen Choice Awards	Choice Vampire: Robert Pattinson	Won
2011	Teen Choice Awards	Choice Vampire: Nikki Reed	Nominated
2011	Teen Choice Awards	Choice Male Hottie: Robert Pattinson	Nominated
2011	Teen Choice Awards	Choice Male Hottie: Taylor Lautner	Nominated

== Sequel ==
Summit Entertainment announced it would adapt Breaking Dawn into a two-part film in June 2010. The Twilight Saga: Breaking Dawn – Part 1 was released on November 18, 2011, and Part 2 on November 16, 2012 with Bill Condon directing.
