= Weezer (Teal Album) =

2019 studio album by Weezer

Studio album of cover songs by Weezer
- Released: January 24, 2019
- Recorded: 2018
- Studios: The Steakhouse; The Village
- Genres: Pop rock; power pop; synth-pop
- Length: 36:18
- Labels: Atlantic; Crush
- Producers: Mark Rankin; Weezer

Weezer chronology
Pacific Daydream (2017)	Weezer (2019)	Weezer (2019)

Singles from Weezer
- 1. "Africa" Released: May 29, 2018

Weezer (also known as the Teal Album) is the twelfth studio album by the American rock band Weezer. It was released digitally on January 24, 2019, through Crush Music and Atlantic Records, with a retail release on March 8. Produced by Mark Rankin and the band itself, the album is composed of cover songs, mostly from the 1980s, making it the band's first covers album.

It was announced and released on the same day as a surprise precursor to Weezer's thirteenth studio album, which was released on March 1, 2019. The album received mixed reviews, with some praising the self-aware frivolity of the project, while others criticized the arrangements.

== Background ==
Following the release of Weezer's eleventh album Pacific Daydream, an Internet fan campaign was launched to get Weezer to cover "Africa" by Toto. After initially releasing a cover of "Rosanna", a different Toto song, as a joke, Weezer released their "Africa" cover in May 2018. The cover hit the Billboard Hot 100 and peaked at number one on the Billboard Alternative Songs chart.

Teal was unexpectedly released on January 24, 2019, without prior promotion or advertisement. Several covers on the album have previously been performed live by both the band and frontman Rivers Cuomo at solo shows.

The album was released digitally on January 24, 2019, with the physical version planned for release on March 8, 2019. To promote the album, Weezer released a teal velcro wallet available for purchase on their website, with the first 100 copies sold including a dollar bill signed by the band members. The velcro wallet sold out quickly, so Weezer released a second promotional bundle on January 24 with a teal Rubik's cube. The band's cover of "No Scrubs" received significant social media attention, with the song trending on Twitter and sparking both sincere and ironic reactions from fans who found the song choice surprising, while TLC member Rozonda "Chilli" Thomas, who sang lead vocal on the original version, openly praised Weezer's rendition, declaring it "AWESOME!!!" on her Twitter account and adding, "It would be even better if we sang it with ya'll!!! I see a TLC/Weezer concert coming up." Weezer themselves responded to Chilli through their own Twitter account by posting the reply, "Hope you want our number", referring to a key line in the song's chorus.

At their 2019 Coachella performance, Weezer brought out TLC's Chilli, as well as English band Tears for Fears for live versions of "No Scrubs" and "Everybody Wants to Rule the World", respectively.

Though not appearing on the official soundtrack, their cover of A-ha's "Take On Me" is featured in the 2020 animated film The SpongeBob Movie: Sponge on the Run.

== Critical reception ==
Professional ratings
Aggregate scores
Source	Rating
Metacritic	58/100
Review scores
Source	Rating
AllMusic	3/5 stars
Consequence of Sound	B
Dead Press!	7/10 stars
Drowned in Sound	6/10
Hot Press	8/10
NME	3/5 stars
Now	1/5 stars
Punknews.org	3.5/5 stars
Spill Magazine	3/5 spills
Under the Radar	3.5/10 stars

According to the review aggregator Metacritic, The Teal Album received "mixed or average reviews" based on a weighted average score of 58 out of 100 from 10 critic scores. In a review of the album for AllMusic, editor Stephen Thomas Erlewine wrote that "Taken on a strictly musical terms, The Teal Album is pretty anodyne stuff. Weezer replicates the arrangements of beloved songs, adds a bit more fuzz on the guitar solos, and flattens the vocal affectations, which amounts to one weird trick: Weezer doesn't attempt to make the songs their own, yet these versions unmistakably sound like Weezer." Matt Beaumont at NME stated "Respectful enough to rouse any struggling family gathering but knowing enough to amuse those in on the joke, 'The Teal Album' at once satirises the covers album and makes a decent stab at perfecting it."

Reviewing the album for Glide Magazine, James Roberts concluded that "The lifelessness of the covers ensures that it has a shelf life that isn't much longer than your average meme. I suppose given the origins of the album as a Twitter meme it makes sense. Everything about the album—from its conception to its surprise, digital only release—points to the fact that we aren't meant to take it that seriously. But that's kind of the problem, isn't it? Nothing Weezer does can be taken seriously anymore." Nick Flanagan gave the album a grading of 1 out of 5 in the review for Now, claiming that "what's horrible about this record is the total lack of controversy, the lack of anything. It doesn't even pass as a joke album – they're just straight-ahead paint-by-numbers covers, like something a wedding band might play." Tim Sommer wrote that "... there is no reason to listen to The Teal Album. There are no revelations, no hearts are placed on sleeves, no one will be moved, and no one will bother to play one of these tracks in the future", adding that "... Weezer despise the American music consuming public, and want to prove that today's consumer will click on literally the most banal and redundant nonsense."

Michael Roffman was more positive in an assessment for Consequence of Sound, writing "At best, it's a blueprint or rather a teaser for their forthcoming tours, as if to say, "Well, you loved 'Africa', look what else we can do? Come out, folks." Again, that's a more cynical outlook, but hey, maybe Cuomo is being cynical. Maybe this is the self-defeater in him, acknowledging the times, knowing damn well that if he's going to give 'em what they want, he's going to meet them at their level with a shit-eating grin and walk back to the bank."

== Commercial performance ==
The Teal Album peaked at number five in its second week on the Billboard 200, after debuting at number 47 the previous week. This was a significant rebound from Weezer's previous album, Pacific Daydream, which only reached number 23. In its first full tracking week, it debuted with 39,000 album-equivalent units, of which 27,000 were pure album sales.

In addition to the singles "Africa" and "Take On Me," many other songs from the album charted.

== Track listing ==
No.	Title	Writer(s)	Original artist	Length
1.	"Africa"	David Paich; Jeff Porcaro	Toto	3:58
2.	"Everybody Wants to Rule the World"	Roland Orzabal; Ian Stanley; Chris Hughes	Tears for Fears	4:04
3.	"Sweet Dreams (Are Made of This)"	Annie Lennox; David A. Stewart	Eurythmics	3:34
4.	"Take On Me"	Magne Furuholmen; Morten Harket; Pål Waaktaar	A-ha	3:43
5.	"Happy Together"	Alan Gordon; Garry Bonner	The Turtles	2:25
6.	"Paranoid"	Geezer Butler; Tony Iommi; Ozzy Osbourne; Bill Ward	Black Sabbath	2:44
7.	"Mr. Blue Sky"	Jeff Lynne	Electric Light Orchestra	4:46
8.	"No Scrubs"	Kevin "She'kspere" Briggs; Kandi Burruss; Tameka "Tiny" Cottle; Lisa "Left Eye" Lopes	TLC	3:10
9.	"Billie Jean"	Michael Jackson	Michael Jackson	4:54
10.	"Stand by Me"	Ben E. King; Jerry Leiber; Mike Stoller	Ben E. King	3:00
Total length:				36:18

== Personnel ==
Weezer

- Rivers Cuomo
- Patrick Wilson
- Brian Bell
- Scott Shriner

Production

- Mark Rankin – production, engineering, mixing
- Weezer – production
- Suzy Shinn – vocal engineering
- Eric Boulanger – mastering

Visuals

- Sean Murphy – photography
- Brendan Walter – art direction
- Jade Ehlers – layout

== Charts ==
=== Weekly charts ===
Chart (2019)	Peak position
Australian Albums (ARIA)	49
Belgian Albums (Ultratop Flanders)	81
Canadian Albums (Billboard)	8
Irish Albums (IRMA)	66
New Zealand Albums (RMNZ)	29
Scottish Albums (Official Charts)	35
UK Albums (Official Charts)	60
US Billboard 200	5
US Top Rock Albums (Billboard)	1

=== Year-end charts ===
Chart (2019)	Position
US Top Rock Albums (Billboard)	51
