= Weezer (Black Album) =

2019 studio album by Weezer

Studio album by Weezer
- Released: March 1, 2019
- Recorded: 2018
- Studios: United Recording (Los Angeles); Federal Prism (Los Angeles)
- Genres: Pop rock; power pop; electropop
- Length: 37:40
- Labels: Atlantic; Crush
- Producer: Dave Sitek

Weezer chronology
Weezer (2019)	Weezer (2019)	OK Human (2021)

Singles from Weezer
- 1. "California Snow" Released: September 20, 2018; 2. "Can't Knock the Hustle" Released: October 11, 2018; 3. "Zombie Bastards" Released: November 21, 2018; 4. "High as a Kite" / "Living in L.A." Released: February 21, 2019

Weezer (also known as the Black Album) is the thirteenth studio album by the American rock band Weezer. Produced by Dave Sitek, it was released on March 1, 2019, through Crush Music and Atlantic Records, just five weeks after their previous self titled album. It received mixed reviews.

== Background ==
Weezer frontman Rivers Cuomo first hinted at the album in April 2016, shortly after the band released their tenth studio album Weezer (also known as the white album). "What could stand out more against 'White' than 'Black'? I think it's going to maybe be like Beach Boys gone bad. I'm thinking of swearing, which is something I've never done in songs."

While promoting the band's eleventh album Pacific Daydream in August 2017, Cuomo said "The original plan was the Black Album but Pacific Daydream really came together. The Black Album is pretty much ready, it's coming."

Weezer tried to embrace the modern era by using data to determine their track listing. In the words of Rivers Cuomo, they used a "modern method of sequencing, which is to put the songs with the broadest appeal up front, and then it goes in descending order and the songs get weirder and weirder"

== Release ==
Cuomo first told Australian radio station Double J in February 2018 that the album would be released on May 25, later hinting at dates such as June 1 and 12 on his Twitter account. On October 11, the first single from the album, "Can't Knock the Hustle", was released. A second song, "Zombie Bastards", was released on November 21, along with cover art and a release date for the album, set as March 1, 2019. Two more singles followed on February 21, 2019, which are "High as a Kite" and "Living in L.A.". Additionally, "California Snow" was released as a single for the soundtrack of the 2018 film Spell. On the day before release, three songs from the album premiered on the video game Fortnite.

== Critical reception ==
Professional ratings
Aggregate scores
Source	Rating
AnyDecentMusic?	5.1/10
Metacritic	53/100
Review scores
Source	Rating
AllMusic	4/5 stars
The A.V. Club	B−
Consequence of Sound	C−
Kerrang!	2/5
The New Zealand Herald	3.5/5 stars
NME	3/5 stars
Pitchfork	5.7/10
Q	4/5 stars
Rolling Stone	3/5 stars
The Times	2/5 stars

According to the review aggregator Metacritic, Weezer (Black Album) received "mixed or average reviews" based on a weighted average score of 53 out of 100 from 20 critic scores.

Robert Oliver at Drowned in Sound gave the album a favorable review, stating "This is a unique addition to Weezer's discography that sees them preparing for the future, however bleak and overwhelming it might seem." Aaron Mook also reacted positively, writing "The Black Album feels surprisingly genuine for the aging pop-rockers, brimming with new sounds, bold production choices from TV on the Radio's Dave Sitek, and most importantly, honest reflection on how the world has turned and left the band following their return to relevancy."

However, Lindsay Teske from Consequence of Sound noted that the album is "not completely void of redeeming qualities", but also opined that "While it is absolutely no crime for a band to flirt with sonic experimentation, a disastrous affair can brew when the flirtation results in a body of work that is far more two-dimensional and hollow than what the band have proven capable of doing through their decades of previous work." Additionally, a negative review from Exclaim!'s Corey van den Hoogenband, stated that "Weezer's latest is an utterly skippable collection that'd be entirely unremarkable if not for the fact it was released by Weezer."

== Track listing ==
All tracks are written by Rivers Cuomo, except where noted.

Weezer track listing
No.	Title	Writer(s)	Length
1.	"Can't Knock the Hustle"		3:42
2.	"Zombie Bastards"	Cuomo; Rami Yacoub	4:10
3.	"High as a Kite"	Cuomo; Josh Alexander	3:48
4.	"Living in L.A."	Cuomo; Jonny Coffer; Jerome Williams	3:38
5.	"Piece of Cake"		3:16
6.	"I'm Just Being Honest"	Cuomo; David Hodges; Ammar Malik	3:56
7.	"Too Many Thoughts in My Head"		4:03
8.	"The Prince Who Wanted Everything"	Cuomo; Brian Bell; Luther Russell	3:23
9.	"Byzantine"	Cuomo; Laura Jane Grace	4:10
10.	"California Snow"		3:34
Total length:			37:40

== Personnel ==
Personnel taken from Weezer CD booklet.

Weezer

- Brian Bell
- Rivers Cuomo
- Scott Shriner
- Patrick Wilson

Additional musicians

- Money Mark – keyboards on "Can't Knock the Hustle" and "Byzantine"
- Sam Robles – horns on "The Prince Who Wanted Everything"
- Todd Simon – horns on "The Prince Who Wanted Everything"

Production

- David Andrew Sitek – producer, engineer
- Kool Kojak – additional production on "Can't Knock the Hustle"
- Jonny Coffer – co-producer on "Living in L.A."
- Jerome Williams – additional production on "Living in L.A."
- Liza Boldyreva – assistant engineer
- Matty Green – mixing
- Eric Boulanger – mastering
- Michael Beinhorn – pre/post production
- Jason Hiller – additional guitar engineering

Artwork

- Brendan Walter – photography
- TNSN DVSN – creative direction & design

== Charts ==
Chart (2019)	Peak position
Australian Digital Albums (ARIA)	24
Belgian Albums (Ultratop Flanders)	103
Belgian Albums (Ultratop Wallonia)	143
Canadian Albums (Billboard)	56
German Albums (Offizielle Top 100)	96
Scottish Albums (Official Charts)	18
Swiss Albums (Schweizer Hitparade)	82
UK Albums (Official Charts)	73
US Billboard 200	19
