= Pacific Daydream =

Studio album by Weezer
- Released: October 27, 2017
- Recorded: 2016–2017
- Genres: Pop rock; alternative rock; power pop; alternative pop
- Length: 34:29
- Labels: Atlantic; Crush
- Producers: Butch Walker; Jonny Coffer; J.R. Rotem; Toby Gad

Weezer chronology
Weezer (2016)	Pacific Daydream (2017)	Weezer (2019)

Singles from Pacific Daydream
- 1. "Feels Like Summer" Released: March 16, 2017; 2. "Happy Hour" Released: October 31, 2017

Pacific Daydream is the eleventh studio album by American rock band Weezer, released on October 27, 2017 on Crush Management, and Atlantic Records. The majority of the album was produced by Butch Walker, with Jonny Coffer and J.R. Rotem producing the album's lead single "Feels Like Summer". The album is trademarked by a modern pop sound, differing from their previous work.

Released to mixed reviews, Pacific Daydream reached number twenty-three on the Billboard 200 and number sixty-eight on the UK Albums Chart. The album received a Grammy Award nomination for Best Rock Album at the 61st Annual Grammy Awards.

== Background and recording ==
In 2016, frontman Rivers Cuomo began filling a folder of songs intended for a darker project (provisionally titled The Black Album) but ultimately completed a second folder with songs that were of a different nature first, leading to the creation of Pacific Daydream. In April, Cuomo teased the album, describing it as "Beach Boys gone bad", tackling "more mature topics" and "less summer day and more winter night". As Cuomo began writing and recording, they found the songs to be more "like reveries from a beach at the end of the world [... as if] the Beach Boys and The Clash fell in love by the ocean and had one hell of an amazing baby". The band ultimately pushed back plans for The Black Album and began focusing on the new collection of songs. Guitarist Brian Bell later said "Whatever it's going to be called, it's going to be fucking awesome." Inspired by an ancient Chinese proverb by Chuang Chou, Cuomo hoped to explore more "radical" sounds, a departure from the "classic" style of The White Album. Cuomo's original title for the album was Somebody's Daydream, but he later explained that the band's drummer, Pat Wilson, thought "Pacific" was a more attractive alternative than "Somebody's", and ultimately the group settled on Pacific Daydream.

To create the album, Cuomo utilized various musical and lyrical fragments he had collected over time. He kept an archive of song ideas and hired programmers to organize a spreadsheet of lyric snippets by beats per minute, syllable, and key to call from whenever stuck. "Instead of trying to force myself to feel inspired, I can just go into the spreadsheet and search [...] I just try them out to see which ones work magically."

== Writing and composition ==
=== Songs ===
Cuomo has described the album as having an overall theme of "alienation and loneliness and not feeling like I have a place to fit in", describing it as having a "darker, sadder undertone to it relative to" their previous album. The album's opening track, "Mexican Fender", written by Cuomo and Toby Gad, was based on Cuomo's interactions with Katy Goodman, of the indie rock band La Sera. Cuomo credited Jake Sinclair, the producer for The White Album, in assisting with the creation of the track. "Beach Boys", an ode to the Beach Boys, was written specifically to sound "the least like [them]", and describes Cuomo's experiences of "being in downtown LA at night and being totally disoriented and alienated". The song's bridge features quotes from Murry Wilson, the father of the Beach Boys' Brian Wilson. The album's lead single, "Feels Like Summer", is an "EDM-infused" track about "the death of [Cuomo's] June bride", who's now "home with the angels." The track was written through a "cut-and-paste" style that Cuomo had adopted while writing for The White Album. "Weekend Woman", the album's third promotional single, features an opening nod to The Zombies' "Time of the Season", as well as a verse melody previously used in a Green Album outtake, "Burning Sun".

=== Music ===
John Pareles of The New York Times called the album a "collection of pop-rock songs with old-fashioned verse-chorus-bridge structures", while Derek Rossignol of Uproxx stated that, with Pacific Daydream, "the band has proven that they’re still capable purveyors of sunny and bright alternative rock". Alex Hudson of Exclaim! stated that the album attempts to carry on the band's signature power pop style, while adding more electronic production. Andrew Trendell of NME asserted that "'Pacific Daydream' is all carefree, expertly crafted pop, free of irony and all the better for it". Allen J. Miller of CrypticRock proclaimed the album has a "sunny disposition and accomplished alt-pop sensibility."

== Release and promotion ==
On March 16, 2017, the band released the album's first single, "Feels Like Summer". On August 17, the band unveiled the album art, title, and opening track, "Mexican Fender", as well as its accompanying music video. Another promotional single, "Beach Boys", was released on September 14. "Happy Hour" was the album's second official single, released on October 31, 2017.

== Reception ==
=== Commercial ===
Pacific Daydream debuted at number 23 on the Billboard 200, which made it the lowest debut performance for a Weezer studio album since their 1994 debut. It is also the band's first album since 1996's Pinkerton to fail to debut in the top 10.

=== Critical ===
Professional ratings
Aggregate scores
Source	Rating
AnyDecentMusic?	5.5/10
Metacritic	64/100
Review scores
Source	Rating
AllMusic	3.5/5 stars
Alternative Press	3.5/5 stars
The A.V. Club	C−
Consequence of Sound	B−
The New Zealand Herald	3.5/5 stars
NME	4/5 stars
The Observer	3/5 stars
Pitchfork	4.3/10
Q	4/5 stars
Rolling Stone	3/5 stars

According to the review aggregator Metacritic, Pacific Daydream received "generally favorable reviews" based on a weighted average score of 64 out of 100 from 23 critic scores. Jake Kilroy of Consequence of Sound describes it as "a strong album, but not a strong Weezer album", adding "But if you ever wanted to hear Weezer at their professionally sharpest, this is surely it. It's no surprise that Cuomo is a fan of pop smashes like Carly Rae Jepsen's 'Call Me Maybe', as Pacific Daydream might be more Train than Ozma...For the band to be at its full potential, though, the songwriter needs to reflect more on the takeaways of experiences rather than the moments themselves." Andrew Trendell at NME opined that aging has not worn Weezer down, stating "Pacific Daydream is all carefree, expertly crafted pop, free of irony and all the better for it. Lock the doors, crack open a cold one, and enjoy an endless summer with Weezer."

Saby Reyes-Kulkarni from Pitchfork was more critical of the album, noting "for the second album in a row, Cuomo anchors the music more specifically to California. Sure, that's worked for scores of artists in the past, but a crucial part of Weezer's appeal was that you could believe they came out of any garage on any tree-lined cul-de-sac in any suburban zip code in the U.S. Pacific Daydream, in spite of its name, mostly just gives you a feeling of being nowhere."

=== Accolades ===
The album received a Grammy Award nomination for Best Rock Album at the 61st Annual Grammy Awards.

== Track listing ==
All tracks produced by Butch Walker except where noted.

No.	Title	Writer(s)	Producer(s)	Length
1.	"Mexican Fender"	Rivers Cuomo; Tobias Gad	Walker; Gad	3:09
2.	"Beach Boys"	Cuomo		3:51
3.	"Feels Like Summer"	Cuomo; Patrick Morrissey; Jonny Coffer; J.R. Rotem; David Dahlquist; Dan Goldberger; Taylor Upsahl	Coffer; J.R. Rotem^{[a]}	3:15
4.	"Happy Hour"	Cuomo; Chris Sernel; Seann Bowe	Oh, Hush!; Walker	2:57
5.	"Weekend Woman"	Cuomo		4:05
6.	"QB Blitz"	Cuomo		3:17
7.	"Sweet Mary"	Cuomo; Josh Alexander		3:42
8.	"Get Right"	Cuomo; Jonny Coffer; Johnny McDaid; Alexander		3:12
9.	"La Mancha Screwjob"	Cuomo; Alexander		3:27
10.	"Any Friend of Diane's"	Cuomo		3:34
Total length:				34:29

Japanese bonus track
No.	Title	Writer(s)	Length
11.	"Feels Like Summer" (acoustic)	Cuomo; Morrissey; Coffer; Rotem; Dahlquist; Goldberger	3:15

Track notes

- ^{^[a]} signifies a co-producer

== Personnel ==
Weezer

- Brian Bell
- Rivers Cuomo
- Scott Shriner
- Patrick Wilson

Additional musicians

- Butch Walker – additional guitar, synth, percussion, and backing vocals
- Daniel Brummel – acoustic guitar, slide guitar, piano, clarinet, percussion, and horn arrangement on "Sweet Mary"
- Ihui Wu – trumpet on "Sweet Mary"
- Josh Alexander – piano on "Sweet Mary"

Production

- Butch Walker – producer and engineer (tracks 1, 2, 4–10)
- Jonny Coffer – producer (track 3)
- J.R. Rotem – co-producer (track 3)
- Oh, Hush! – additional production (track 4)
- Todd Stopera – engineer (tracks 1, 2, 4–10)
- Suzy Shinn – engineer (track 3)
- Eric Valentine – mixing (tracks 1, 2, 4–10), mastering
- Tony Maserati – mixing (track 3)

== Charts ==
Chart (2017–18)	Peak position
Australian Albums (ARIA)	64
Belgian Albums (Ultratop Flanders)	93
Belgian Albums (Ultratop Wallonia)	152
Canadian Albums (Billboard)	41
Dutch Albums (Album Top 100)	177
New Zealand Heatseeker Albums (RMNZ)	1
Scottish Albums (Official Charts)	37
Spanish Albums (Promusicae)	99
UK Albums (Official Charts)	68
US Billboard 200	23
US Top Alternative Albums (Billboard)	3
US Top Rock Albums (Billboard)	4
