= King of the Clouds =

Promotional single by Panic! at the Disco

from the album Pray for the Wicked
- Released: June 18, 2018
- Recorded: 2018
- Length: 2:41
- Label: Fueled by Ramen; DCD2
- Songwriter(s): Brendon Urie; Jake Sinclair; Sam Hollander; Alex Kresovich; Suzy Shinn
- Producer(s): Jake Sinclair; Alex 'AK' Kresovich; Suzy Shinn

Audio video
- "King of the Clouds" on YouTube

"King of the Clouds" is a song by Panic! at the Disco released on June 18, 2018 as the second promotional single from their sixth studio album, Pray for the Wicked, through Fueled by Ramen and DCD2 Records.

== Background and release ==
"King of the Clouds" was written by Panic! at the Disco's lead vocalist Brendon Urie, Sam Hollander, Jake Sinclair, Alex Kresovich, and Suzy Shinn. Production was handled by Jake Sinclair, Alex Kresovich, and Suzy Shinn. The string section was composed and conducted by Rob Mathes and recorded at Abbey Road Studios in London, England.

The song was released four days prior to its parent studio album, Pray for the Wicked, on June 18, 2018 through Fueled by Ramen. A snippet of the song was used at the end of a tour recap video on the band's official YouTube channel on April 18, 2018. "King of the Clouds" made its radio debut on Beats 1 as Zane Lowe's "Hottest Record in the World Right Now" for June 18, 2018.

In an interview with Zane Lowe on Beats 1, Brendon Urie explained that the song almost didn't make the album due to timing. Producer Jake Sinclair brought the song to him the day before the album deadline and when Urie heard the track he called it "the dopest song I've ever heard". Citing the last-minute nature of its completion, co-producer Alex Kresovich stated that, “I didn’t get the parts I needed to work on until 2:30 a.m. With it due in just a few hours, I was really sweating bullets and just trying to stay awake. We worked until 4:30 a.m. and got everything done and turned in for mixing just in time.”

The lyrical concepts for the song came together during a writing session when Urie got "blitzed out of his mind" and was "verbal vomit(ing)" about "Carl Sagan, the multiverse, and inter-dimensional travel." Unbeknownst to Urie, songwriting partner Sam Hollander was writing down everything he was saying and came back to him with the song idea days later.

In numerous interviews, Brendon Urie cited "King of the Clouds" as his favorite song on Pray for the Wicked and the one he is "most excited to perform live." Urie has described the song as "very Bohemian-esque," noting that it was inspired by "Bohemian Rhapsody" by Queen, a song the band regularly performs.

== Reception ==
Forbes magazine described it as having "frenetic drumming" and "tasty electronic flourishes" with Urie "flexing his huge vocal range." Billboard described it as similarly "manic" to the album's previous releases.

== Charts ==
=== Weekly charts ===
Chart (2018)	Peak position
US Hot Rock & Alternative Songs (Billboard)	11

=== Year-end charts ===
Chart (2018)	Position
US Hot Rock Songs (Billboard)	71

== Certifications ==
Region	Certification	Certified units/sales
United States (RIAA)	Gold	500,000^{‡}
^{‡} Sales+streaming figures based on certification alone.
