= Suzy Shinn =

American music producer, songwriter and engineer

- Born: Suzanne Lyn Shinn; December 20, 1994 (age 31)
- Occupations: Producer; songwriter; engineer

Suzanne Lyn Shinn (born December 20, 1994) is an American producer, songwriter, and engineer based in Los Angeles. Shinn majored in music production and engineering at Berklee College of Music. She is known for her work with Panic! at the Disco, Weezer, Fall Out Boy, Dua Lipa, and Katy Perry, among many others. She co-wrote and produced "Catch 22" by Australian rapper Illy featuring Anne-Marie which went on to win the 2018 APRA Urban work of the year. In 2019, Shinn also released a Splice sample pack featuring drum and vocal samples.

2026 releases produced by Shinn include Modest Mouse's album An Eraser and a Maze, and Kid Sistr's EP American Teenage Prophecy, which she also co-wrote.

== Discography ==
Year	Artist	Album	Song	Role
2026	Modest Mouse	An Eraser And A Maze	"Picking Dragons' Pockets"	Additional Production
2026	Modest Mouse	An Eraser And A Maze	"Life's A Dream"	Producer
2026	Modest Mouse	An Eraser And A Maze	"Third Side of the Moon"	Producer, Vocals
2026	Modest Mouse	An Eraser And A Maze	"Dogbed in Heaven / Give It a Skeleton"	Producer, Vocals
2026	Modest Mouse	An Eraser And A Maze	"I Can't Talk Right Now"	Producer, Vocals, Double Bass
2026	Modest Mouse	An Eraser And A Maze	"Speak 'N Spell (Or Not)"	Producer
2026	Modest Mouse	An Eraser And A Maze	"Rotten Fruit" (featuring pkpkpkpk)	Additional Production, Assistant Producer
2026	Modest Mouse	An Eraser And A Maze	"Knocked Down by Waves"	Producer
2026	Modest Mouse	An Eraser And A Maze	"Absolutely Necessary Never"	Producer
2026	Modest Mouse	An Eraser And A Maze	"Look How Far..."	Producer
2026	Modest Mouse	An Eraser And A Maze	"Impossible Somedays"	Producer, Acoustic Guitar
2026	Iration	Where It All Began	"Grapevine"	Producer, Writer
2026	Iration	Where It All Began	"Castle"	Producer, Writer
2026	Lykke Li	The Afterparty	"Knife In The Heart"	Background Vocals
2026	Ian Frandsen	Non-album single	"Little Fish"	Producer
2026	Cannons	Everything Glows	"Take Me to Tokyo"	Writer
2026	Cannons	Everything Glows	"Starlight"	Background Vocals
2026	Kid Sistr	American Teenage Prophecy	"Guts"	Producer, Writer
2026	Kid Sistr	American Teenage Prophecy	"Boys In Skirts"	Producer, Writer
2026	Kid Sistr	American Teenage Prophecy	"Maniac"	Producer, Writer
2026	Kid Sistr	American Teenage Prophecy	"American Teenage Prophecy"	Producer
2025	Kid Sistr	American Teenage Prophecy	"Shitshow"	Producer, Writer
2025	BEAUTY SCHOOL DROPOUT	WHERE DID ALL THE BUTTERFLIES GO?	"WHERE DID ALL THE BUTTERFLIES GO?"	Writer
2025	LIZ, SOPHIE	Non-album single	"Sunscreen"	Writer, Engineer
2025	Lindsay Lohan	Freakier Friday (Original Motion Picture Soundtrack)	"Baby (Acoustic)"	Producer, Engineer
2025	Lindsay Lohan	Freakier Friday (Original Motion Picture Soundtrack)	"Baby (Beach)"	Producer, Engineer
2025	Maitreyi Ramakrishnan	Freakier Friday (Original Motion Picture Soundtrack)	"One Fine Day"	Producer, Engineer
2025	Lindsay Lohan, Julia Butters	Freakier Friday (Original Motion Picture Soundtrack)	"Baby"	Producer, Engineer
2025	Christina Vidal Mitchell	Freakier Friday (Original Motion Picture Soundtrack)	"Take Me Away"	Producer, Engineer
2025	Lucy Sugerman	Non-album singles	"native tongue"	Writer
2025	Lucy Sugerman	Non-album singles	"like dad, like son"	Writer
2025	Aidan Bissett	shut up and love me	"2 much 2 handle"	Producer, Writer, Engineer, Background Vocals, Programming, Guitar, Keyboards
2025	Sawyer Hill	Heartbreak Hysteria	"Need Me Now"	Producer, Writer
2025	Sawyer Hill	Heartbreak Hysteria	"Hear From Me"	Producer
2025	Johan Lenox	Full Speed Nowhere	"When Morning Comes"	Producer
2024	Slowly Slowly	Non-album single	"Forgiving Spree"	Writer, Producer
2024	Frances Forever	Lockjaw	"Stuck"	Producer
2024	Frances Forever	Lockjaw	"Too Soft"	Producer, Writer
2024	Frances Forever	Lockjaw	"Nobody's Daughter"	Producer, Writer
2024	Frances Forever	Lockjaw	"Monica Gives Me Lockjaw"	Producer, Writer
2024	Frances Forever	Lockjaw	"Clean of You"	Producer, Writer
2024	SOPHIE	SOPHIE	"Live In My Truth"	Vocal Producer
2024	SOPHIE	SOPHIE	"Why Lies"	Vocal Producer
2024	Carlie Hanson	Non-album single	"too late to cry"	Producer, Engineer
2024	walt disco	The Warping	"You Make Me Feel So Dumb"	Producer, Writer, Engineer
2024	Iration	Non-album singles	"Obvious (No Doubt)"	Producer, Writer
2024	Iration	Non-album singles	"Island Time"	Producer, Writer
2024	Illuminati Hotties feat. Cavetown	Non-album single	"Didn't (feat. Cavetown)"	Writer
2024	Love Fame Tragedy	Life Is A Killer	"Don't You Want To Sleep With Someone Normal?"	Writer
2023	Lauran Hibberd and Alex Gaskarth	Non-album singles	"pretty good for a bad day"	Producer, Writer, Engineer, Guitar
2023	Jai Wolf feat. BANKS	Non-album singles	"Don't Look Down feat. BANKS"	Engineer
2023	Nitefire	The Great, Unwashed	"Frustrated"	Producer
2023	Nitefire	The Great, Unwashed	"Working On Myself"	Producer, Engineer
2023	Alex Lahey	The Answer Is Always Yes	"Permanent"	Writer
2023	Bethany Cosentino	Natural Disaster	"Natural Disaster"	Writer
2023	Georgia Gets By	Non-album single	"Easier to Run"	Producer, Writer
2023	Cherry Glazerr	I Don't Want You Anymore	"Sugar"	Writer
2023	THE BLSSM	Non-album single	"WHO'S TO SAY"	Writer
2023	Iration	Daytrippin	"Daytrippin"	Producer, Writer
2023	Iration	Daytrippin	"California Dreams"	Producer, Writer
2022	EKKSTACY	misery	"i gave you everything"	Producer
2022	EKKSTACY	misery	"wish i was dead"	Producer, Writer
2022	EKKSTACY	misery	"eyeliner"	Writer
2022	EKKSTACY	misery	"i wish you were pretty on the inside"	Producer
2022	Sunflower Bean	Headful of Sugar	"Stand By Me"	Writer
2022	carolesdaughter	Non-album single	"sunshine and roses"	Producer, Engineer
2022	carolesdaughter	please put me in a medically induced coma	"Dead Boy (in my room)"	Producer, Writer, Engineer
2022	carolesdaughter	please put me in a medically induced coma	"Cold Bathroom Floor"	Producer, Engineer
2022	THE BLSSM	PURE ENERGY	"NOT TODAY"	Producer, Writer
2022	THE BLSSM	PURE ENERGY	"DIZZY"	Producer, Writer
2022	Weezer	SZNZ: Winter	"I Want A Dog"	Producer
2022	Weezer	SZNZ: Winter	"Iambic Pentameter"	Producer
2022	Weezer	SZNZ: Winter	"Basketball"	Producer, Additional Vocals
2022	Weezer	SZNZ: Winter	"Sheraton Commander"	Producer
2022	Weezer	SZNZ: Winter	"Dark Enough to See the Stars"	Producer
2022	Weezer	SZNZ: Winter	"The One That Got Away"	Producer
2022	Weezer	SZNZ: Winter	"The Deep and Dreamless Sleep"	Producer
2022	Weezer	SZNZ: Autumn	"Can't Dance, Don't Ask Me"	Producer, Engineer, Vocals
2022	Weezer	SZNZ: Autumn	"Get Off On The Pain"	Producer, Engineer
2022	Weezer	SZNZ: Autumn	"What Happens After You?"	Producer, Engineer, Programming
2022	Weezer	SZNZ: Autumn	"Francesca"	Producer, Engineer
2022	Weezer	SZNZ: Autumn	"Should She Stay or Should She Go"	Producer, Engineer
2022	Weezer	SZNZ: Autumn	"Tastes Like Pain"	Producer, Engineer
2022	Weezer	SZNZ: Autumn	"Run, Raven, Run"	Producer, Engineer, Programming
2022	Weezer	SZNZ: Summer	"Lawn Chair"	Vocal Producer, Additional Production
2022	Weezer	SZNZ: Summer	"Records"	Vocal Producer, Additional Production
2022	Weezer	SZNZ: Summer	"Blue Like Jazz"	Vocal Producer, Additional Production
2022	Weezer	SZNZ: Summer	"The Opposite Of Me"	Vocal Producer, Additional Production
2022	Weezer	SZNZ: Summer	"What's The Good Of Being Good"	Vocal Producer, Additional Production
2022	Weezer	SZNZ: Summer	"Cuomoville"	Vocal Producer, Additional Production
2022	Weezer	SZNZ: Summer	"Thank You and Good Night"	Vocal Producer, Additional Production
2022	Weezer	SZNZ: Spring	"Opening Night"	Producer
2022	Weezer	SZNZ: Spring	"Angels On Vacation"	Producer
2022	Weezer	SZNZ: Spring	"A Little Bit of Love"	Producer
2022	Weezer	SZNZ: Spring	"The Garden of Eden"	Producer
2022	Weezer	SZNZ: Spring	"The Sound Of Drums"	Producer
2022	Weezer	SZNZ: Spring	"All This Love"	Producer
2022	Weezer	SZNZ: Spring	"Wild At Heart"	Producer
2021	Weezer	Van Weezer	"The End of the Game"	Producer
2021	Weezer	Van Weezer	"All The Good Ones"	Producer, Engineer, Guitar, Additional Vocals, Synthesizer
2021	Weezer	Van Weezer	"Hero"	Producer, Engineer, Guitar, Additional Vocals
2021	Weezer	Van Weezer	"I Need Some of That"	Producer, Engineer, Additional Vocals
2021	Weezer	Van Weezer	"Beginning of the End"	Producer, Engineer
2021	Weezer	Van Weezer	"Blue Dream"	Producer, Engineer
2021	Weezer	Van Weezer	"1 More Hit"	Producer, Engineer
2021	Weezer	Van Weezer	"Sheila Can Do It"	Producer, Engineer
2021	Weezer	Van Weezer	"She Needs Me"	Producer, Engineer
2021	Weezer	Van Weezer	"Precious Metal Girl"	Producer, Engineer
2021	Weezer	OK Human	"All My Favorite Songs"	Vocal Producer, Engineer
2021	Weezer	OK Human	"Aloo Gobi"	Vocal Producer, Engineer
2021	Weezer	OK Human	"Grapes Of Wrath"	Vocal Producer, Engineer
2021	Weezer	OK Human	"Numbers"	Vocal Producer, Engineer
2021	Weezer	OK Human	"Playing My Piano"	Vocal Producer, Engineer
2021	Weezer	OK Human	"Mirror Image"	Vocal Producer, Engineer
2021	Weezer	OK Human	"Screens"	Vocal Producer, Engineer
2021	Weezer	OK Human	"Bird With A Broken Wing"	Vocal Producer, Engineer
2021	Weezer	OK Human	"Dead Roses"	Vocal Producer, Engineer
2021	Weezer	OK Human	"Everything Happens For A Reason"	Vocal Producer, Engineer
2021	Weezer	OK Human	"Here Comes The Rain"	Vocal Producer, Engineer
2021	Weezer	OK Human	"La Brea Tar Pits"	Vocal Producer, Engineer
2021	Alicia Keys	KEYS	"Billions (Unlocked)"	Producer, Programming
2021	Tom Morello, Andrew McMahon and the Wilderness	The Atlas Underground Flood	"The Maze"	Producer, Engineer, Background Vocals, Programming, Synthesizer, Percussion
2021	Andrew McMahon and the Wilderness	Non-album single	"New Year Song"	Producer
2021	Lauran Hibberd	Goober	"Bleugh"	Producer, Writer
2021	Lauran Hibberd	Goober	"How Am I Still Alive?" (featuring Lydia Night)	Producer, Writer
2021	Lauran Hibberd	Goober	"Crush"	Producer, Writer
2021	Lauran Hibberd	Non-album single	"Charlie's Car"	Producer, Writer
2021	Cherry Glazerr	Non-album single	"Soft Drink"	Producer
2021	carolesdaughter	Non-album single	"My Mother Wants Me Dead"	Producer, Engineer, Programming, Guitar
2021	Pale Waves	Who Am I?	"Tomorrow"	Writer
2021	Pale Waves	Who Am I?	"Run To"	Writer
2020	Hot Chelle Rae	Tangerine	"Tangerine"	Writer
2020	Emily Burns	I Love You, You're The Worst	"Terrified"	Co-Producer, Programming, Guitar, Additional Vocals, Keyboards, Percussion, Bass Guitar
2020	Lauran Hibberd	Non-album single	"Boy Bye"	Producer, Writer
2019	Little Hurt	Non-album single	"Good As It Gets"	Writer
2019	Fall Out Boy	Greatest Hits: Believers Never Die – Volume Two	"Dear Future Self (Hands Up)"	Additional Production, Background Vocals
2019	Weezer	Weezer (Teal Album)	"Africa"	Vocal Engineer
2018	Fall Out Boy	Lake Effect Kid	"City in a Garden"	Engineer
2018	Fall Out Boy	Lake Effect Kid	"Super Fade"	Engineer
2018	Ghost	Prequelle	"Witch Image"	Writer
2018	Panic! at the Disco	Pray for the Wicked	"(Fuck A) Silver Lining"	Engineer, Background Vocals
2018	Panic! at the Disco	Pray for the Wicked	"Say Amen (Saturday Night)"	Writer, Co-producer, Background Vocals
2018	Panic! at the Disco	Pray for the Wicked	"Hey Look Ma, I Made It"	Engineer, Background Vocals
2018	Panic! at the Disco	Pray for the Wicked	"High Hopes"	Engineer, Background Vocals
2018	Panic! at the Disco	Pray for the Wicked	"Roaring 20s"	Engineer, Background Vocals
2018	Panic! at the Disco	Pray for the Wicked	"Dancing's Not A Crime"	Co-producer, Engineer, Background Vocals, Guitar
2018	Panic! at the Disco	Pray for the Wicked	"One Of The Drunks"	Co-producer, Engineer, Background Vocals
2018	Panic! at the Disco	Pray for the Wicked	"The Overpass"	Co-Producer, Writer, Engineer
2018	Panic! at the Disco	Pray for the Wicked	"King of the Clouds"	Co-Producer, Writer, Engineer, Background Vocals
2018	Panic! at the Disco	Pray for the Wicked	"Old Fashioned"	Engineer, Background Vocals
2018	Panic! at the Disco	Pray for the Wicked	"Dying In LA"	Engineer
2018	5 Seconds of Summer	Youngblood	"Woke Up In Japan"	Engineer
2018	5 Seconds of Summer	Youngblood	"Why Won't You Love Me"	Engineer
2018	Fall Out Boy	M A N I A	"Champion"	Drum Technician
2018	Fall Out Boy	M A N I A	"Stay Frosty Royal Milk Tea"	Engineer
2018	Fall Out Boy	M A N I A	"Young and Menace"	Engineer
2018	Panic! at the Disco	The Greatest Showman: Reimagined	"The Greatest Show"	Engineer
2017	Dua Lipa	Dua Lipa	"Begging"	Vocal Producer
2017	Train	A Girl, a Bottle, a Boat	"What Good Is Saturday"	Writer, Additional Production, Engineer, Background Vocals
2017	Lea Michele	Places	"Love Is Alive"	Vocal Engineer
2017	Lea Michele	Places	"Heavy Love"	Vocal Engineer
2017	Lea Michele	Places	"Proud"	Vocal Engineer
2017	Lea Michele	Places	"Run to You"	Vocal Engineer
2017	Lea Michele	Places	"Heavenly"	Vocal Engineer
2017	Lea Michele	Places	"Getaway Car"	Vocal Engineer, Mixing Engineer
2017	Lea Michele	Places	"Sentimental Memories"	Vocal Engineer
2017	Lea Michele	Places	"Tornado"	Vocal Engineer
2017	Lea Michele	Places	"Hey You"	Vocal Engineer
2017	Weezer	Pacific Daydream	"Feels Like Summer"	Engineer
2016	Sia	This Is Acting	"Reaper"	Engineer
2016	Illy feat. Anne-Marie	Non-album single	"Catch 22 (featuring Anne-Marie)"	Producer, Writer
2016	Weezer	Weezer (White Album)	"California Kids"	Engineer
2016	Weezer	Weezer (White Album)	"Wind in Our Sail"	Engineer
2016	Weezer	Weezer (White Album)	"Thank God for Girls"	Engineer
2016	Weezer	Weezer (White Album)	"(Girl We Got A) Good Thing"	Engineer
2016	Weezer	Weezer (White Album)	"Do You Wanna Get High?"	Engineer
2016	Weezer	Weezer (White Album)	"King of the World"	Engineer
2016	Weezer	Weezer (White Album)	"Summer Elaine and Drunk Dori"	Engineer
2016	Weezer	Weezer (White Album)	"L.A. Girlz"	Engineer
2016	Weezer	Weezer (White Album)	"Jacked Up"	Engineer
2016	Weezer	Weezer (White Album)	"Endless Bummer"	Engineer
2016	Panic! at the Disco	Death of a Bachelor	"Victorious"	Co-Producer, Engineer, Background Vocals
2016	Panic! at the Disco	Death of a Bachelor	"Don't Threaten Me with a Good Time"	Engineer
2016	Panic! at the Disco	Death of a Bachelor	"Hallelujah"	Engineer
2016	Panic! at the Disco	Death of a Bachelor	"Emperor's New Clothes"	Engineer
2016	Panic! at the Disco	Death of a Bachelor	"Death Of A Bachelor"	Co-Producer, Engineer, Background Vocals
2016	Panic! at the Disco	Death of a Bachelor	"Crazy=Genius"	Co-Producer, Engineer, Background Vocals
2016	Panic! at the Disco	Death of a Bachelor	"LA Devotee"	Co-Producer, Engineer, Background Vocals
2016	Panic! at the Disco	Death of a Bachelor	"Golden Days"	Co-Producer, Engineer, Background Vocals
2016	Panic! at the Disco	Death of a Bachelor	"The Good, the Bad and the Dirty"	Co-Producer, Engineer, Background Vocals
2016	Panic! at the Disco	Death of a Bachelor	"House of Memories"	Engineer
2016	Panic! at the Disco	Death of a Bachelor	"Impossible Year"	Engineer
