= Girlfriend Material =

Studio album by Lauran Hibberd
- Released: 22 March 2024
- Genre: Pop-punk
- Label: Virgin Music
- Producers: Aaron Gillespie; Suzy Shinn

Lauran Hibberd chronology
Garageband Superstar (2022)	Girlfriend Material (2024)

Singles from Girlfriend Material
- 1. "I Suck at Grieving" Released: 21 September 2023; 2. "Mary" Released: 16 November 2023; 3. "Pretty Good for a Bad Day" Released: 15 December 2023; 4. "2nd Prettiest Girl (In the World)" Released: 15 February 2024

Girlfriend Material (stylised in lowercase) is the second studio album by English singer-songwriter Lauran Hibberd from the Isle of Wight. It was released on 22 March 2024 through Virgin Music. Production was handled by Aaron Gillespie and Suzy Shinn. It features a lone guest appearance from Alex Gaskarth.

Along with the singles, music videos were released for songs "I Suck at Grieving", "Mary", "Pretty Good for a Bad Day" and "2nd Prettiest Girl (In the World)".

The album debuted at No. 17 on the Scottish Albums chart, No. 31 on the UK Albums Sales Chart, No. 27 on the UK Physical Albums Chart, No. 30 on the UK Vinyl Albums Chart and No. 12 on the UK Record Store Chart.

== Critical reception ==
Professional ratings
Aggregate scores
Source	Rating
Metacritic	68/100
Review scores
Source	Rating
Clash	7/10
DIY	4/5 stars
Kerrang!	3/5
musicOMH	3/5 stars
The Line of Best Fit	8/10

Girlfriend Material was met with generally favourable reviews from music critics. At Metacritic, which assigns a normalized rating out of 100 to reviews from mainstream publications, the album received an average score of 68, based on six reviews.

Adam England of DIY called the album "a well-rounded collection of songs", saying it "shows Lauren as an artist coming into her own, and her enjoyment shines through in her music". Christopher Hamilton-Peach of The Line of Best Fit wrote: "Girlfriend Material sees shimmer traded for increased complexity alongside a confident pop-punk presence – one that defines the album's major strength alongside a sharply served side-eye view of society". Narzra Ahmed of Clash praised the album, saying "we are so here for Lauran's honesty and the way tracks like "Mary" and "Jealous" and "90's Kid" are anthemic yet personal".

In mixed reviews, Emma Wilkes of Kerrang! resumed: "nonetheless, even if the follow-up to 2022's Garageband Superstar isn't wildly innovative, there's a smorgasbord of catchy tunes fizzing with sugary energy". John Murphy of musicOMH stated: "it's certainly a confident step-up from Garageband Superstar and if more of Hibberd's musical personality is allowed to shine through next time around, she could produce an even better album".

== Track listing ==
No.	Title	Writer(s)	Producer(s)	Length
1.	"I Suck at Grieving"	Lauran Hibberd; Aaron Gillespie; Jake Richardson	Aaron Gillespie	3:58
2.	"Jealous"	Hibberd; Mike Champion; Paul Whalley	Aaron Gillespie	2:55
3.	"Mary"	Hibberd; Dan Swank	Aaron Gillespie	2:56
4.	"90's Kid"	Hibberd; Gillespie; Nick Bailey	Aaron Gillespie	2:44
5.	"Happy for You"	Hibberd; Gillespie; Cameron Becker	Aaron Gillespie	2:46
6.	"Better Than I Was Before"	Hibberd	Aaron Gillespie	2:46
7.	"Anti Fragile"	Hibberd; Gillespie; Bailey	Aaron Gillespie	2:53
8.	"2nd Prettiest Girl (In the World)"	Hibberd; Sierra Annie; Cameron Walker	Aaron Gillespie	2:48
9.	"Girlfriend Material"	Hibberd; Annie; Michael Robinson	Aaron Gillespie	2:56
10.	"Pretty Good for a Bad Day" (featuring Alex Gaskarth)	Hibberd; Alex Gaskarth; Suzanne Lyn Shinn; Dan Book	Suzy Shinn	3:15
11.	"So Romantic"	Hibberd; Gillespie; Richardson	Aaron Gillespie	2:27
12.	"Not the Girl You Hoped"	Hibberd; Gillespie	Aaron Gillespie	3:54

Notes

- All song titles stylised in lowercase.

== Personnel ==
- Lauran Hibberd — vocals, guitar (tracks: 1, 6)
- Alex Gaskarth — vocals (track 10)
- Jess Baker — backing vocals (tracks: 4, 9), guitar (tracks: 8, 11)
- Aaron Gillespie — guitar (tracks: 1–5, 7–9, 11, 12), producer & recording (tracks: 1–9, 11, 12)
- Suzy Shinn — guitar, producer & recording (track 10)
- Danen Reed — mixing, mastering (tracks: 3, 6)
- Adam Grover — mastering (tracks: 1–5, 7–12)

== Charts ==
Chart (2024)	Peak position
Scottish Albums (Official Charts)	17
