= Viva Las Vengeance (song) =

Single by Panic! at the Disco

from the album Viva Las Vengeance
- Released: June 1, 2022
- Genre: Power pop
- Length: 3:27
- Label: Fueled by Ramen; DCD2
- Songwriters: Brendon Urie; Jake Sinclair; Mike Viola
- Producers: Butch Walker; Jake Sinclair; Mike Viola

Panic! at the Disco singles chronology
"Hey Look Ma, I Made It" (2019)	"Viva Las Vengeance" (2022)	"Middle of a Breakup" (2022)

Music video
- "Viva Las Vengeance" on YouTube

"Viva Las Vengeance" is a song by Panic! at the Disco, released on June 1, 2022, as the lead single from their seventh and final studio album of the same name. It was written by Brendon Urie, Jake Sinclair, and Mike Viola, and produced by Butch Walker, Sinclair, and Viola. The song was announced on May 29, 2022, and released alongside its music video.

== Reception ==
Jon Blistein of Rolling Stone described the track as a "stomping blast of power-pop with frontman Brendon Urie bellowing against a background of lush, Queen-esque harmonies".

== Music video ==
The music video was released on June 1, 2022, and directed by Brendan Walter. The video involves the whole band performing on an Ed Sullivan Show-esque late-night talk show. While Urie is performing, he suffers several painful injuries but continues singing, even as his piano eats him alive. After the last line, the video cuts to an exhausted, but unharmed Urie seated at his piano, relieved that his injuries were some sort of hallucination, until he finds a single drop of blood on the piano keys.

== Personnel ==
Credits adapted from Tidal.

Musicians

- Brendon Urie – vocals, guitar, synthesizer, piano, harpsichord, drums
- Jake Sinclair – bass, guitar, synthesizer, organ, backing vocals
- Mike Viola – guitar, synthesizer, piano, organ, harpsichord, backing vocals

Technical

- Butch Walker – producer
- Jake Sinclair – producer
- Mike Viola – producer
- Johnny Morgan – additional producer
- Rouble Kapoor – additional producer
- Bernie Grundman – mastering
- Claudius Mittendorfer – mixing, recording
- Rachel White – recording

== Charts ==
Weekly chart performance for "Viva Las Vengeance"
Chart (2022)	Peak position
Canada Rock (Billboard)	39
Czech Republic (Modern Rock)	2
New Zealand Hot Singles (RMNZ)	32
US Hot Rock & Alternative Songs (Billboard)	14
US Rock & Alternative Airplay (Billboard)	10

== Release history ==
Release dates and formats for "Viva Las Vengeance"
Region	Date	Format(s)	Label	Ref.
Various	June 1, 2022	Digital download; streaming	Fueled by Ramen	
United States	June 7, 2022	Alternative radio	Fueled by Ramen; Elektra	
