= High Hopes (Panic! at the Disco song) =

- White Panda remix artwork

Single by Panic! at the Disco

from the album Pray for the Wicked
- Released: May 23, 2018
- Recorded: 2017–2018
- Studio: Capitol (Los Angeles, California) (strings/horns)
- Genre: Pop; pop rock
- Length: 3:10
- Label: Fueled by Ramen; DCD2
- Songwriters: Brendon Urie; Jake Sinclair; Jenny Owen Youngs; Lauren Pritchard; Sam Hollander; William Lobban-Bean; Jonas Jeberg; Taylor Parks; Ilsey Juber
- Producers: Jake Sinclair; Jonas Jeberg

Panic! at the Disco singles chronology
"Say Amen (Saturday Night)" (2018)	"High Hopes" (2018)	"Hey Look Ma, I Made It" (2019)

Music video
- "High Hopes" on YouTube

"High Hopes" is a song by American pop rock solo project Panic! at the Disco. Their song was released through Fueled by Ramen and DCD2 Records on May 23, 2018, as the second single from the band's sixth studio album, Pray for the Wicked (2018). Their song was written and produced by Jake Sinclair and Jonas Jeberg, and co-written by Brendon Urie, Jenny Owen Youngs, Lauren Pritchard, Sam Hollander, William Lobban-Bean, Taylor Parks, and Ilsey Juber, with additional production by Jonny Coffer. It was serviced to alternative radio on July 31, 2018, and impacted hot adult contemporary radio, along with the music video, on August 27, 2018, and US pop radio the following day.

"High Hopes" peaked at number four on the US Billboard Hot 100, becoming the band's highest-charting song on the chart, surpassing their 2006 breakout single "I Write Sins Not Tragedies". It topped the charts in Poland and reached the top ten and top twenty in several countries, becoming their highest-charting single worldwide. It holds the record for most weeks spent at number one on the US Hot Rock Songs chart, at 65 weeks. It also became the act's first single to top one of Billboard's Dance/Electronic charts, reaching number-one on its Dance/Mix Show Airplay list in February 2019.

== Background ==
"High Hopes" was written and produced by Jake Sinclair and Jonas Jeberg, and co-written by Brendon Urie, Jenny Owen Youngs, Lauren Pritchard, Sam Hollander, William Lobban-Bean, Taylor Parks, and Ilsey Juber; with additional production by Jonny Coffer. Jeberg, Parks, Juber, and Lobban-Bean began writing the song at a BMI writing camp in Aspen, Colorado in 2015. When the four of them had arrived an hour early, they decided to go into a hot tub together outside. Jeberg has said of the song's conception: "I was sitting in the hot tub, singing bass notes. We didn't have any instruments because we were in the hot tub. I was singing bass notes and directing chords in that way, and we were brainstorming different lyrics." Eventually they set up a portable recording studio and began recording a demo version with a beat, horns and vocals. Initially, the song's hook was conceived as a rap song, and they began sending it to different artists who all declined. In 2016, Panic! at the Disco's management company said the band wanted to record the song for their next studio album. In early 2018, lead singer Brendon Urie co-wrote the verses for "High Hopes," before Sinclair and Jeberg (later, Coffer) were brought in to finish the production.

== Composition ==
Sheet music for the song shows the key of F major with a tempo of 80–84 beats per minute. During their live performances, it is sung in the key of E-flat major. Urie's vocals span from the low note D_{3} to the high note of D_{5.}

== Music video ==
The audio track was uploaded to Panic! at the Disco's official YouTube channel on the same day of its release on May 23, 2018. An official music video for the song was uploaded on August 27, 2018. As of May 5, 2025, the music video has 808 million views.

The video features lead vocalist Brendon Urie walking through Los Angeles as people bump into him. Eventually, he sizes up a skyscraper with a glass exterior. Determined, he presses a foot to the glass, flips horizontally, and begins walking up the outside of the wall. People flock to the base of the building, recording Urie and watching with awe. He waves to the people below and inside the building, and finally gets to the roof as the crowd below applauds. Once on the roof, he joins the rest of the band as the sun sets, and continues to sing the final chorus of the song.

== Live performances ==
To promote the album, the band performed the song at the 2018 MTV Video Music Awards and their concert on The Today Show.

== Critical reception ==
Paste magazine described it as having "a blaring brass section" and "crisp vocals." Rolling Stone described it as "upbeat" and having "punchy horns."

== Commercial performance ==
"High Hopes" peaked at number four on the Billboard Hot 100, making it Panic! at the Disco's highest-charting song, exceeding the peak of "I Write Sins Not Tragedies", which reached number seven 12 years prior. In August 2019, the song became one of the few songs to spend a full year on the chart when it logged its 52nd week on the chart. Also in the United States, it reached number one on the Radio Songs airplay chart, marking their first leader there. Worldwide, the song has charted highly, reaching number seven in Australia and number twelve in the United Kingdom, also becoming their highest-charting song in those countries. Also, "High Hopes" is the fourth song to top the Pop Songs, Adult Pop Songs and Alternative Songs charts simultaneously since the Adult Pop Songs chart began in Billboard in March 1996, the Pop Songs chart began in October 1992 and the Alternative Songs chart began in September 1988. Also, with 14 weeks on top of Radio Songs, "High Hopes" tied Alicia Keys' "No One" and Celine Dion's "Because You Loved Me" for fifth longest-leading number one on the Radio Songs chart, which began in 1990.

With 15 weeks on top of Adult Pop Songs, "High Hopes" became the longest-leading No. 1 on the Adult Pop Songs chart of the 2010s, which began in Billboard's pages in March 1996. "High Hopes" also has the distinction of being the first Panic! at the Disco song to register on the Billboard Adult Contemporary chart, where it peaked at number eight. In June 2019, "High Hopes" broke the record for most weeks at No. 1 on Billboard's Hot Rock Songs chart, logging 34 consecutive weeks at the top. On the chart dated January 18, 2020, "High Hopes" set a new record on Billboard's Hot Rock Songs chart, logging its 52nd week at the top – an entire year. It went on to spend a total of 65 weeks atop the chart, eventually dethroned by Twenty One Pilots' "Level of Concern", another release from Fueled by Ramen label, on April 25, 2020. It was ranked number-one on the 2019 Year-End Rock Songs chart.

In late 2023, for the 35th anniversary of Alternative Airplay, Billboard ranked "High Hopes" as the ninth most successful song in the chart's history.

== Use in media and politics ==
When the song first came out, NBC Sports used it to promote their coverage of the 2018 Stanley Cup Final which had the band's hometown team, the Vegas Golden Knights, in the finals against the Washington Capitals. The band later performed the song before Game 5, the eventual final game of the series.

Later on that year, CBS Sports used "High Hopes" to promote their featured SEC Game of the Week. In 2023, CBS included the song in a six-minute long video tribute to the SEC on CBS that they posted on social media, as the network's contract with the conference expired following the 2023 SEC Championship Game. The tribute video, which also included "Hall of Fame" by The Script and "A Sky Full of Stars" by Coldplay, later aired during CBS's pregame show.

In 2019, Rede Globo used "High Hopes" as the background music in advertisements for its streaming service Globoplay to advertise its offerings and programs. The song was also used in the trailer for the 2019 animated film Klaus.

The song was the campaign anthem of 2020 Democratic Party presidential candidate Pete Buttigieg and was played at most of his rallies and speeches. A special dance to the song was created by staff and volunteers of the Buttigieg campaign. It was also used by candidates Amy Klobuchar, Cory Booker and Julian Castro in the 2020 Democratic Party presidential primaries.

The song was featured and remixed in the heavily panned YouTube Rewind 2018: Everyone Controls Rewind. It was used in the soundtrack for the NHL 19 video game, as well as the trailers for films such as the 2021 animated film The Mitchells vs. the Machines and the 2019 animated Christmas film Klaus.

The song was used at a Trump re-election rally in June 2020, to which Urie tweeted "Dear Trump Campaign, Fuck you. You’re not invited. Stop playing my song. No thanks, Brendon Urie, Panic! At The Disco & company," which was accompanied by a cease and desist order and a voter registration link encouraging fans to vote against Trump in November.

The song is used as the walk on song for 2022 UK Open champion, Danny Noppert.

== Awards and nominations ==
Year	Ceremony	Category	Result	Ref.
2018	Teen Choice Awards	Rock/Alternative Song	Nominated	
2019	American Music Awards	Favorite Song – Pop/Rock	Nominated	
2019	ASCAP Pop Music Awards	Winning Song	Won	
2019	Billboard Music Awards	Top Rock Song	Won	
2019	iHeartRadio Music Awards	Alternative Rock Song of the Year	Won	
2019	iHeartRadio Titanium Awards	Winning Song	Won	
2019	MTV Video Music Awards	Best Rock Video	Won	

== Track listing ==
- Digital download – White Panda remix
1. "High Hopes" (White Panda remix) – 2:56
- Digital download – Don Diablo remix
1. "High Hopes" (Don Diablo remix) – 3:05
- Digital download – live version
1. "High Hopes" (live) – 3:22

== Personnel ==
Credits adapted from the liner notes of Pray for the Wicked.

=== Technical ===
- Mixed by Claudius Mittendorfer
- Engineered by Suzy Shinn
- Mastered by Emily Lazar, assisted by Chris Allgood

Mastering assistants:

- Rachel White
- Sacha Bambadji
- Amber Jones
- Katie Shape
- Jason Moser
- Produced by Jake Sinclair and Jonas Jeberg
- Additional production by Jonny Coffer
- Rouble Kapoor – engineering

=== Musicians ===
- Kenneth Harris – guitar, background vocals
- Jake Sinclair – bass, guitar, background vocals
- Brendon Urie – lead vocals, drums, piano, background vocals
- Jonny Coffer – programming
- Cook Classics – programming
- Ilsey Juber – background vocals
- Suzy Shinn – background vocals

Strings/horns

- Rob Mathes – conductor, string and horn arrangements
- Peter Rotter – musician contracting
- Thomas Bowes – string leader

Violins:

- Bruce Dukov (Concertmaster)
- Charlie Bisharat
- Julie Gigante
- Jessica Guideri
- Lisa Liu
- Maya Magub
- Serena McKinney
- Helen Nightengale
- Katia Popov
- Tereza Stanislav
- Thomas Bowes
- Warren Zielinski
- Jackie Hartley
- Rita Manning
- Peter Hanson
- Tom Pigott-Smith
- Emlyn Singleton
- Cathy Thompson

Violas:

- Brian Dembow (Leader)
- Robert Brophy
- Shawn Mann
- Dach Dellinger
- Peter Lale
- Bruce White

Cellos:

- Steve Erdody (Leader)
- Jacob Braun
- Eric Byers
- Caroline Dale
- Tim Gill

Sax:

- Jason Fabus
- Peter Slocombe
- Morgan Jones

Trumpet:

- Mike Rocha
- Jonathan Bradley

- Ryan Dragon – trombone
- Mike and Lora Casteel – music preparation
- Steve Genewick – recording
- Paula Salvatore – studio manager

== Charts ==
=== Weekly charts ===
Weekly chart performance for "High Hopes"
Chart (2018–21)	Peak position
Australia (ARIA)	7
Austria (Ö3 Austria Top 40)	3
Belgium (Ultratop 50 Flanders)	2
Belgium (Ultratop 50 Wallonia)	10
Bolivia (Monitor Latino)	5
Canada Hot 100 (Billboard)	5
Canada AC (Billboard)	12
Canada CHR/Top 40 (Billboard)	1
Canada Hot AC (Billboard)	1
Canada Rock (Billboard)	36
Croatia (HRT)	11
Czech Republic Airplay (ČNS IFPI)	10
Czech Republic Singles Digital (ČNS IFPI)	2
Denmark (Tracklisten)	12
Estonia (Eesti Tipp-40)	6
Euro Digital Song Sales (Billboard)	4
Finland (Suomen virallinen lista)	5
France (SNEP)	15
Germany (GfK)	5
Global 200 (Billboard)	190
Greece International (IFPI)	17
Hungary (Dance Top 40)	20
Hungary (Rádiós Top 40)	2
Hungary (Single Top 40)	5
Hungary (Stream Top 40)	4
Iceland (Tónlistinn)	6
Ireland (IRMA)	13
Israel (Media Forest)	3
Italy (FIMI)	20
Japan (Japan Hot 100)	40
Luxembourg Digital Songs (Billboard)	3
Mexico Airplay (Billboard)	4
Netherlands (Dutch Top 40)	2
Netherlands (Single Top 100)	5
New Zealand (Recorded Music NZ)	16
Norway (VG-lista)	15
Poland Airplay (ZPAV)	1
Portugal (AFP)	20
Puerto Rico (Monitor Latino)	4
Romania (Airplay 100)	44
Scottish Singles Sales (Official Charts)	13
Singapore (RIAS)	16
Slovakia Airplay (ČNS IFPI)	7
Slovakia Singles Digital (ČNS IFPI)	8
Slovenia (SloTop50)	3
Spain (Promusicae)	76
Sweden (Sverigetopplistan)	5
Switzerland (Schweizer Hitparade)	3
UK Singles (Official Charts)	12
Ukraine Airplay (TopHit)	30
US Billboard Hot 100	4
US Adult Contemporary (Billboard)	8
US Adult Pop Airplay (Billboard)	1
US Dance Club Songs (Billboard)	49
US Dance Airplay (Billboard)	1
US Hot Rock & Alternative Songs (Billboard)	1
US Latin Pop Airplay (Billboard)	40
US Pop Airplay (Billboard)	1
US Rock & Alternative Airplay (Billboard)	1
US Rolling Stone Top 100	46
Venezuela Anglo (Monitor Latino)	16

=== Year-end charts ===
Year-end chart performance for "High Hopes"
Chart (2018)	Position
Australia (ARIA)	32
Austria (Ö3 Austria Top 40)	22
Germany (Official German Charts)	54
Netherlands (Airplay Top 40)	98
Switzerland (Schweizer Hitparade)	72
UK Singles (OCC)	90
US Adult Top 40 (Billboard)	44
US Hot Rock & Alternative Songs (Billboard)	9

Chart (2019)	Position
Australia (ARIA)	71
Austria (Ö3 Austria Top 40)	17
Belgium (Ultratop Flanders)	16
Belgium (Ultratop Wallonia)	37
Canada (Canadian Hot 100)	16
Denmark (Tracklisten)	38
France (SNEP)	64
Germany (Official German Charts)	28
Hungary (Dance Top 40)	55
Hungary (Rádiós Top 40)	7
Hungary (Single Top 40)	18
Hungary (Stream Top 40)	5
Iceland (Tónlistinn)	19
Italy (FIMI)	63
Latvia (LAIPA)	57
Netherlands (Dutch Top 40)	25
Netherlands (Single Top 100)	28
Poland (ZPAV)	28
Portugal (AFP)	86
Slovenia (SloTop50)	13
Sweden (Sverigetopplistan)	34
Switzerland (Schweizer Hitparade)	14
Ukraine Airplay (Tophit)	130
UK Singles (OCC)	31
US Billboard Hot 100	11
US Adult Contemporary (Billboard)	12
US Adult Top 40 (Billboard)	2
US Dance/Mix Show Airplay (Billboard)	6
US Hot Rock & Alternative Songs (Billboard)	1
US Mainstream Top 40 (Billboard)	7
US Rock Airplay (Billboard)	1
US Rolling Stone Top 100	37

Chart (2020)	Position
Hungary (Rádiós Top 40)	66
US Hot Rock & Alternative Songs (Billboard)	3

Chart (2022)	Position
Hungary (Rádiós Top 40)	50

Chart (2023)	Position
Hungary (Rádiós Top 40)	54

Chart (2025)	Position
Hungary (Rádiós Top 40)	43

=== Decade-end charts ===
Decade-end chart performance for "High Hopes"
Chart (2010–19)	Position
US Hot Rock Songs (Billboard)	4

== Certifications ==
Region	Certification	Certified units/sales
Australia (ARIA)	5× Platinum	350,000^{‡}
Austria (IFPI Austria)	3× Platinum	90,000^{‡}
Belgium (BRMA)	Platinum	40,000^{‡}
Canada (Music Canada)	9× Platinum	720,000^{‡}
Denmark (IFPI Danmark)	2× Platinum	180,000^{‡}
France (SNEP)	Diamond	333,333^{‡}
Germany (BVMI)	3× Gold	600,000^{‡}
Italy (FIMI)	2× Platinum	100,000^{‡}
Netherlands (NVPI)	Platinum	80,000^{‡}
New Zealand (RMNZ)	5× Platinum	150,000^{‡}
Norway (IFPI Norway)	Gold	30,000^{‡}
Poland (ZPAV)	Diamond	100,000^{‡}
Portugal (AFP)	2× Platinum	20,000^{‡}
Spain (Promusicae)	2× Platinum	120,000^{‡}
Switzerland (IFPI Switzerland)	Platinum	20,000^{‡}
United Kingdom (BPI)	4× Platinum	2,400,000^{‡}
United States (RIAA)	Diamond	10,000,000^{‡}
Streaming
Japan (RIAJ)	Platinum	100,000,000^{†}
^{‡} Sales+streaming figures based on certification alone.^{†} Streaming-only figures based on certification alone.

== Release history ==
Release dates and formats for "High Hopes"
Region	Date	Format(s)	Label(s)	Ref.
Various	May 23, 2018	Digital download; streaming	Fueled by Ramen; DCD2	
United States	July 31, 2018	Alternative radio	Fueled by Ramen	
United States	August 27, 2018	hot AC radio	Fueled by Ramen	
United States	August 28, 2018	Contemporary hit radio	Fueled by Ramen	
