= Best Thing Ever =

Best Thing Ever may refer to:

- "Best Thing Ever", a 1987 song by Scritti Politti, featured in Who's That Girl (soundtrack) and then Provision (album)
- "Best Thing Ever", a 2013 song by Fortunate, featured in The X Factor (Australia)
- "Best Thing Ever", a 2015 song by Niykee Heaton
- The Best Thing Ever, an American punk rock band
