= Hey Look Ma, I Made It =

2019 single by Panic! at the Disco

Single by Panic! at the Disco

from the album Pray for the Wicked
- Released: February 26, 2019
- Length: 2:49
- Label: Fueled by Ramen; DCD2
- Songwriters: Brendon Urie; Dillon Francis; Michael Angelakos; Sam Hollander; Jake Sinclair; Morgan Kibby
- Producers: Jake Sinclair; Dillon Francis

Panic! at the Disco singles chronology
"High Hopes" (2018)	"Hey Look Ma, I Made It" (2019)	"Viva Las Vengeance" (2022)

Music video
- "Hey Look Ma, I Made It" on YouTube

"Hey Look Ma, I Made It" is a song by Panic! at the Disco from their sixth studio album, Pray for the Wicked, through Fueled by Ramen and DCD2 Records. It was written by frontman Brendon Urie with Michael Angelakos, Sam Hollander, Morgan Kibby, and the track's producers Jake Sinclair and Dillon Francis. The song was made available via album release on June 22, 2018, and it was serviced to alternative radio on February 19, 2019, and US contemporary hit radio on February 26, 2019 as the album's third single. The music video was released on June 21, 2018.

"Hey Look Ma, I Made It" and Panic! at the Disco's previous single, "High Hopes", spent a record 65 consecutive weeks at number 1 on Billboard's Hot Rock Songs chart, from November 2018 to April 2020.

== Music video ==
The music video was released on June 21, 2018. The video follows a puppet version of lead singer Brendon Urie on his journey to fame, occasionally cutting to the real Urie performing the song. After signing a contract with a manager, Brendon lives the glory of being famous. His manager then introduces him to drugs and he becomes addicted, sending his life into a tailspin to the point that he is robbed and beaten. In a bathroom mirror, puppet Urie encounters the real Brendon, who berates him. Puppet Brendon slowly recovers, dumping his drugs into the toilet and taking walks on the beach. The real Urie finishes the song, whereupon his audience is revealed to be puppets. A puppet version of Jimmy Fallon appears on stage and announces the release of Pray for the Wicked, holding up what appears to be a vinyl of the album, referencing Panic! at the Disco's performance on The Tonight Show Starring Jimmy Fallon in which they performed "Say Amen (Saturday Night)". The manager appears and throws puppet Brendon into a lifeless pile of other puppets.

The clip was named one of the top ten best alternative music videos of 2018 by iHeartRadio.

== Reception ==
Billboard described it as having "a vibrant energy" and "bright melodies". AllMusic described it as "sanguine club jam" and having "a strong hook".

== Chart performance ==
In the United States, "Hey Look Ma, I Made It" peaked at number 16, becoming the band's third top 20 hit on the US Billboard Hot 100 after "I Write Sins Not Tragedies", and "High Hopes", which peaked at numbers 7, and 4 respectively and fourth top 40 hit overall. After a record 34 weeks at number 1 on Billboard's Hot Rock Songs chart with "High Hopes", "Hey Look Ma, I Made It" relented the top spot on the July 6, 2019, ranking – reigning for 11 weeks. With the two songs, Panic! went on to lead Hot Rock Songs for a record total of 76 (consecutive) weeks, after "High Hopes" reclaimed the top spot from "Hey Look Ma, I Made It" for another 31 weeks, until the run ended on April 25, 2020, being dethroned by Twenty One Pilots' "Level of Concern". This distinction was previously held by Imagine Dragons (52 straight weeks, from November 18, 2017, to November 3, 2018) and Twenty One Pilots (44; May 21, 2016 – March 18, 2017). Panic!'s switch at number 1 marked the sixth time that an act had replaced itself atop Hot Rock Songs, which began in 2009. Twenty One Pilots first traded spots with "Ride" replacing "Stressed Out", followed by "Heathens" usurping "Ride". Imagine Dragons then landed three straight leaders over a year-long period, with "Thunder" replaced by "Whatever It Takes"; "Thunder" then returned to number 1 before being succeeded by "Natural".

== Charts ==
=== Weekly charts ===
Chart (2018–2020)	Peak position
Belgium (Ultratip Bubbling Under Flanders)	6
Belgium (Ultratop 50 Wallonia)	49
Canada (Canadian Hot 100)	51
Canada AC (Billboard)	34
Canada CHR/Top 40 (Billboard)	20
Canada Hot AC (Billboard)	9
Netherlands (Dutch Top 40)	20
Netherlands (Single Top 100)	68
UK Singles (OCC)	86
US Billboard Hot 100	16
US Adult Contemporary (Billboard)	14
US Adult Pop Airplay (Billboard)	3
US Dance/Mix Show Airplay (Billboard)	14
US Hot Rock & Alternative Songs (Billboard)	1
US Pop Airplay (Billboard)	6
US Rock & Alternative Airplay (Billboard)	5
US Rolling Stone Top 100	68

=== Year-end charts ===
Chart (2018)	Position
US Hot Rock Songs (Billboard)	35
Chart (2019)	Position
Netherlands (Dutch Top 40)	85
US Billboard Hot 100	61
US Adult Contemporary (Billboard)	47
US Adult Top 40 (Billboard)	15
US Hot Rock Songs (Billboard)	2
US Mainstream Top 40 (Billboard)	24
US Rock Airplay (Billboard)	19
Chart (2020)	Position
US Adult Contemporary (Billboard)	45
US Hot Rock & Alternative Songs (Billboard)	9

=== Decade-end charts ===
Chart (2010–2019)	Position
US Hot Rock Songs (Billboard)	46

== Certifications ==
Region	Certification	Certified units/sales
Canada (Music Canada)	2× Platinum	160,000^{‡}
New Zealand (RMNZ)	Gold	15,000^{‡}
United Kingdom (BPI)	Silver	200,000^{‡}
United States (RIAA)	2× Platinum	2,000,000^{‡}
^{‡} Sales+streaming figures based on certification alone.
