= Garage band (disambiguation) =

A garage band plays garage rock.

Garage band may also refer to:

- GarageBand, audio production software by Apple
- GarageBand.com, an online community 2003–2010
- Garage Band, a 2005 graphic novel by Gipi
- "Garage Band", an episode of Beavis and Butt-Head

== See also ==
- UK garage, a genre of electronic dance music
- Garage house, a dance music style
- Grojband, a Canadian/American animated TV series
- Garage (band), Czech rock band from Prague
- Garageband Superstar, a 2022 album by Lauran Hibberd
