= Pray for the Wicked =

Studio album by Panic! at the Disco
- Released: June 22, 2018
- Recorded: 2017–2018
- Genres: Pop; pop rock
- Length: 34:17
- Labels: Fueled by Ramen; DCD2
- Producers: Jake Sinclair; Scott Chesak; Tobias Wincorn; Dillon Francis; Jonas Jeberg; ST!NT; Alex 'AK' Kresovich

Panic! at the Disco chronology
All My Friends We're Glorious (2017)	Pray for the Wicked (2018)	Viva Las Vengeance (2022)

Singles from Pray for the Wicked
- 1. "Say Amen (Saturday Night)" Released: March 21, 2018; 2. "High Hopes" Released: May 23, 2018; 3. "Hey Look Ma, I Made It" Released: February 26, 2019

Pray for the Wicked is the sixth studio album by American pop rock solo project Panic! at the Disco. The album was released on June 22, 2018 on Fueled by Ramen in the United States. It is the follow-up to the band's fifth studio album, Death of a Bachelor (2016). The album was produced by Jake Sinclair and promoted by the singles "Say Amen (Saturday Night)", "High Hopes" and "Hey Look Ma, I Made It", with "(Fuck A) Silver Lining", "Dancing's Not A Crime" and "King of the Clouds" as promotional singles. It received generally positive reviews upon release, with many critics noting Urie's Broadway influences following his performance in Kinky Boots.

== Background ==
Panic! at the Disco released their fifth studio album, Death of a Bachelor, on January 16, 2016. To promote the record, the band embarked on a co-headline tour with Weezer that summer and a United States tour the following year. On April 11, 2017, it was reported that vocalist Brendon Urie would be making his Broadway debut as one of the lead roles in Kinky Boots. Urie performed in the show for ten weeks from May until August 2017.

Following the success of Death of a Bachelor, Urie was given the rest of 2017 off by the band's record label, Fueled by Ramen. However, Urie felt compelled to continue writing music during his time off. The writing process began a month before Urie made his debut in Kinky Boots when he wrote the chorus of "High Hopes". Urie stated that writing the record took about four months total in the span of a year and a half.

Urie teased the band's then-unannounced sixth studio album sporadically throughout late 2017 and early 2018, typically through Instagram Live broadcasts. On March 8, 2018, the band began teasing the release of a lead single and a subsequent album with a two minute long video of Urie brushing his teeth beside an alarm clock reading "3:19" for the video's entirety, accompanied by an orchestral version of "King of the Clouds". The time on the clock led fans to believe that the band would be releasing new material on March 19. Over a week later, fans received packages sent from Urie's P.O. box containing a white bottle reading "Pray for the W!cked / 3:21 / Unholy Water", once more leading to speculation over a release date of March 21. On March 19, the band announced a surprise show at the Grog Shop in Cleveland, Ohio that night. The band unveiled their new touring bassist, Nicole Row, who would be replacing their former member and touring bassist, Dallon Weekes, following his departure on December 27, 2017. No new material was performed at the show.

The album was announced on March 21, 2018, alongside the release of the lead single "Say Amen (Saturday Night)" and a B-side, "(Fuck A) Silver Lining".

The second single "High Hopes" was released on May 23, 2018, followed by the pre-release track "King of the Clouds" on June 18, 2018.

The singles for the album were released in three Spotify combinations: Say Amen for Silver Linings, High Hopes on Saturday Night, and King of High Hopes.

== Critical reception ==
Professional ratings
Aggregate scores
Source	Rating
AnyDecentMusic?	6.1/10
Metacritic	70/100
Review scores
Source	Rating
AllMusic	4/5 stars
The A.V. Club	B−
DIY	3/5 stars
The Guardian	3/5 stars
The Independent	4/5 stars
Kerrang!	3/5
NME	4/5 stars
PopMatters	5/10
Q	3/5 stars
The Times	2/5 stars

Pray for the Wicked has received generally positive reviews from music critics. It holds an average score of 70 out of 100 on Metacritic based on nine reviews, indicating "generally favorable reviews". In a positive review, The Independent said, "Panic! have never released the same album twice, but on Pray for the Wicked it feels as if they've finally managed to channel that frenetic, slightly chaotic attitude into a studio album that is at once eclectic and coherent." In another positive review, NME commented on the influence of Brendon Urie being involved in Kinky Boots on the sound of the album, adding that "while it's fair to say he's always had a flair for theatrics, the experience has injected these tracks with unprecedented levels of sass and drama". Newsday suggested that Urie's "Broadway stint brings him a creative burst and a theatrical bent".

== Commercial performance ==
Pray for the Wicked debuted at number one on the US Billboard 200 with 180,000 album-equivalent units, of which 151,000 were pure album sales. It is the band's second US number-one album. The album also debuted at number one on the ARIA Albums Chart, making it the band's second Australian number-one album. According to Billboard, Pray for the Wicked was the 10th best selling vinyl album of 2018 in the US with sales of 59,000, making a major contribution to the 15% rise of the format in that year. The album was also certified Platinum by the Recording Industry Association of America (RIAA) in the United States.

== Track listing ==
Pray for the Wicked track listing
No.	Title	Writer(s)	Producer(s)	Length
1.	"(Fuck A) Silver Lining" ( (Note: Listed as "(Fxxk A) Silver Lining" on physical releases))	Brendon Urie; Jake Sinclair; Morgan Kibby; Scott Chesak; Johnny Funches; Marvin Junior	J. Sinclair; S. Chesak	2:48
2.	"Say Amen (Saturday Night)"	Urie; Sinclair; Toby Wincorn; Suzy Shinn; Lauren Pritchard; Sam Hollander; Imad Roy El-Amine; Tom Peyton; Thomas Brenneck; Michael Deller; Daniel Foder; Andrew Greene; Brian Profilio; Jared Tankel; Nathan Abshire	J. Sinclair; Tobias Wincorn^{[b]}; Suzy Shinn^{[b]}	3:09
3.	"Hey Look Ma, I Made It"	Urie; Sinclair; Dillon Francis; Michael Angelakos; M. Kibby; Hollander	J. Sinclair; Francis	2:49
4.	"High Hopes"	Urie; Sinclair; Jenny Owen Youngs; Pritchard; Hollander; William Lobban-Bean; Jonas Jeberg; Taylor Parks; Ilsey Juber	J. Sinclair; Jonas Jeberg; Jonny Coffer^{[b]}	3:10
5.	"Roaring 20s"	Urie; Sinclair; Hollander; Kenneth Harris; Youngs; Steph Jones; Benjamin Freedlander; Wincorn; Maynard Ferguson; Gary Lindsay	J. Sinclair; Tobias Wincorn^{[a]}	3:06
6.	"Dancing's Not a Crime"	Urie; Sinclair; John Newman; John Hill; Ajay Bhattacharyya; Hollander; Harris; Christopher Bernard Allen	J. Sinclair; ST!NT^{[a]}	3:39
7.	"One of the Drunks"	Urie; Sinclair; Chill Pill; Alex Goodwin; Hollander; Harris	J. Sinclair; MOTIV^{[a]}; @iamchillpill^{[a]}; Shinn^{[b]}	3:18
8.	"The Overpass"	Urie; Sinclair; Chesak; Shinn; James Brown; Charles Bobbit; Lyn Collins; Kibby	J. Sinclair; S. Chesak	2:57
9.	"King of the Clouds"	Urie; Sinclair; Alex Kresovich; Hollander; Shinn	J. Sinclair; Alex 'AK' Kresovich^{[a]}; Shinn^{[b]}	2:40
10.	"Old Fashioned"	Urie; Sinclair; Wincorn; Hollander; Harris	J. Sinclair; Tobias Wincorn^{[a]}	2:46
11.	"Dying in LA"	Urie; Sinclair; Mike Viola; Hollander	J. Sinclair	3:49
Total length:				34:11

Japanese edition bonus tracks
No.	Title	Length
12.	"Nine in the Afternoon" (live from Orlando, Florida)	2:49
13.	"I Write Sins Not Tragedies" (live from Orlando, Florida)	4:04
14.	"Victorious" (live from Orlando, Florida)	3:54
Total length:		45:07

Notes

Track notes

- ^{^[a]} signifies a co-producer
- ^{^[b]} signifies an additional producer

=== Samples ===
- "(Fuck A) Silver Lining" contains elements from "Oh What a Night" by The Dells.
- "Say Amen (Saturday Night)" contains interpolations of "Aphasia" by The Budos Band and "Crying Pine Grove Blues" by Nathan Abshire.
- "Roaring 20s" and "Old Fashioned" contain elements of "Latino Lovewalk" by Maynard Ferguson.
- "Dancing's Not a Crime" contains samples from "Get Down" by Chris Bernard and Dedicated to the One I Love by The Temprees.
- "The Overpass" contains elements of "Chase" by James Brown and an interpolation of "Mama Feelgood" by Lyn Collins.

== Personnel ==
Credits adapted from the liner notes of Pray for the Wicked.

Panic! at the Disco

- Brendon Urie – lead vocals; background vocals (tracks 1–7, 9 and 10), drums (tracks 2–7, 9 and 10), piano (track 2–4 and 11), bass (tracks 1–3), guitar (track 3)

Additional musicians

- Jake Sinclair – background vocals (tracks 1–7, 9 and 10), bass (tracks 4–8 and 10), organ (tracks 5 and 6), guitar (track 4), acoustic guitar (track 10)
- Rob Mathes – string and horn arrangements, conductor
- Kenneth Harris – guitar (tracks 1–7, 9 and 10), background vocals (tracks 1–7 and 10)
- Suzy Shinn – background vocals (tracks 1–7, 9 and 10), guitar (track 6)
- Scott Chesak – drums (tracks 1 and 8), keyboards (track 1 and 8), guitar (track 8), bass (track 8), percussion (track 1)
- Morgan Kibby – background vocals (track 3)
- Ilsey Juber – background vocals (track 4)
- Jonny Coffer – programming (track 4)
- Cook Classics – programming (track 4)
- Sam Hollander – background vocals (tracks 5, 7, and 10)
- Rachel White – background vocals (tracks 5, 9 and 10)
- Alex Goodwin – drum programming & sequencing (track 7)
- Chill Pill – drum programming & sequencing (track 7)
- Alex Kresovich – piano & organ (track 9)
- Kate Micucci – background vocals (track 9)
- Thomas Bowes – string leader, concertmaster (London), violin
- Bruce Dukov – concertmaster (Los Angeles), violin
- Charlie Bisharat – violin
- Julie Gigante – violin
- Jessica Guideri – violin
- Lisa Lui – violin
- Maya Magub – violin
- Serena McKinney – violin
- Helen Nightengale – violin
- Katia Popov – violin
- Tereza Stanislav – violin
- Warren Zielinski – violin
- Jackie Hartley – violin
- Rita Manning – violin
- Peter Hanson – violin
- Tom Pigott-Smith – violin
- Emlyn Singleton – violin
- Cathy Thompson – violin
- Brian Dembow – string leader (Los Angeles), viola
- Robert Brophy – viola
- Shawn Mann – viola
- Zach Dellinger – viola
- Peter Lale – string leader (London), viola
- Bruce White – viola
- Steve Erdody – string leader (Los Angeles), cello
- Jacob Braun – cello
- Eric Byers – cello
- Caroline Dale – string leader (London), cello
- Tim Gill – cello
- Jason Fabus – saxophone
- Peter Slocombe – saxophone
- Morgan Jones – saxophone
- Mike Rocha – trumpet
- Jonathan Bradley – trumpet
- Ryan Dragon – trombone
- Peter Cobbin – strings (track 9)

Additional personnel

- Rosanna Jones – album illustrations
- Jimmy Fontaine – photography

Production

- Jake Sinclair – production
- Suzy Shinn – additional production (tracks 2 and 6–9), engineering
- Scott Chesak – production (tracks 1 and 8)
- Dillon Francis – production (track 3)
- Jonas Jeberg – production (track 4)
- Toby Wincorn – co-production (tracks 2, 5 and 10)
- Stint – co-production (track 6)
- Chill Pill – co-production (track 7), engineering (track 7)
- MOTIV – co-production (track 7)
- Alex Kresovich – co-production (track 9)
- Jonny Coffer – additional production (track 4)
- Rouble Kapoor – engineering (track 4 and 11)
- Claudius Mittendorfer – mixing
- Emily Lazar – mastering
- Chris Allgood – assistant mastering

== Charts ==
=== Weekly charts ===
Weekly chart performance for Pray for the Wicked
Chart (2018–2019)	Peak position
Australian Albums (ARIA)	1
Austrian Albums (Ö3 Austria)	3
Belgian Albums (Ultratop Flanders)	10
Belgian Albums (Ultratop Wallonia)	39
Canadian Albums (Billboard)	1
Czech Albums (ČNS IFPI)	26
Danish Albums (Hitlisten)	27
Dutch Albums (Album Top 100)	6
Finnish Albums (Suomen virallinen lista)	22
French Albums (SNEP)	101
German Albums (Offizielle Top 100)	8
Hungarian Albums (MAHASZ)	23
Irish Albums (IRMA)	7
Italian Albums (FIMI)	35
Japan Hot Albums (Billboard Japan)	48
Japanese Albums (Oricon)	74
New Zealand Albums (RMNZ)	2
Norwegian Albums (VG-lista)	14
Polish Albums (ZPAV)	37
Portuguese Albums (AFP)	23
Scottish Albums (Official Charts)	3
Slovak Albums (IFPI)	26
Spanish Albums (Promusicae)	24
Swedish Albums (Sverigetopplistan)	27
Swiss Albums (Schweizer Hitparade)	13
UK Albums (Official Charts)	2
US Billboard 200	1
US Top Alternative Albums (Billboard)	1
US Top Rock Albums (Billboard)	1

=== Year-end charts ===
Year-end chart performance for Pray for the Wicked
Chart (2018)	Position
Australian Albums (ARIA)	49
Belgian Albums (Ultratop Flanders)	150
UK Albums (OCC)	64
US Billboard 200	57
US Top Rock Albums (Billboard)	2
Chart (2019)	Position
Canadian Albums (Billboard)	45
Danish Albums (Hitlisten)	78
Icelandic Albums (Plötutíóindi)	94
Swedish Albums (Sverigetopplistan)	84
US Billboard 200	39
US Top Rock Albums (Billboard)	4
Chart (2020)	Position
US Top Rock Albums (Billboard)	27

=== Decade-end charts ===
Decade-end chart performance for Pray for the Wicked
Chart (2010–2019)	Position
US Billboard 200	190

== Certifications ==
Certifications for Pray for the Wicked
Region	Certification	Certified units/sales
Australia (ARIA)	Gold	35,000^{‡}
Austria (IFPI Austria)	Platinum	15,000^{‡}
Canada (Music Canada)	Platinum	80,000^{‡}
Denmark (IFPI Danmark)	Platinum	20,000^{‡}
Netherlands (NVPI)	Gold	20,000^{‡}
New Zealand (RMNZ)	Platinum	15,000^{‡}
United Kingdom (BPI)	Gold	100,000^{‡}
United States (RIAA)	2× Platinum	2,000,000^{‡}
^{‡} Sales+streaming figures based on certification alone.
