= Alex Kresovich =

American music producer, songwriter, and research scientist

- Born: August 28, 1986 (age 40); Harlingen, Texas, U.S.
- Education: Cornell University (BS); University of Georgia (MA); University of North Carolina at Chapel Hill (PhD)
- Occupations: Music producer; songwriter; Research scientist
- Years active: 2009–present

Alex Kresovich (also known as AK) (born August 28, 1986) is an American record producer and songwriter from Ithaca, New York. His work includes co-producing the RIAA Gold-certified single "King of the Clouds" on Panic! at the Disco's 2018 album, Pray for the Wicked. The album debuted at #1 on the Billboard 200, is certified Double Platinum by the RIAA, and won the Billboard Music Award for Top Rock Album.

Kresovich earned a Doctor of Philosophy (PhD) degree at the University of North Carolina at Chapel Hill, where he studied the influence of popular music referencing mental health topics on the mental health attitudes and behaviors of U.S. youth. His research, published in JAMA Pediatrics, found a significant increase in the prevalence of mental health themes in popular rap music over the last two decades. In 2025, he published findings in JAMA revealing that the majority of high-engagement social media posts promoting prescription drugs lacked proper sponsorship disclosures, highlighting significant gaps in federal regulatory oversight. His work has received media coverage in The New York Times and U.S. News & World Report, and he appeared as a mental health and music lyrics expert in the critically acclaimed 2025 documentary STANS.

== Music career ==
Kresovich was mentored by GRAMMY winner Ken Lewis and has collaborated with a diverse range of artists and songwriters. His production and songwriting credits include work with Panic! at the Disco, CeeLo Green, X Ambassadors, Niykee Heaton, MAX, Hoodie Allen, and King Los. He has also worked alongside prominent songwriters like Emily Warren, Ingrid Andress, Michael Pollack, Jesse Saint John, and Kevin Hissink.

In 2011, Kresovich won the 2K Sports/Duck Down Music NBA 2K12 Soundtrack Contest.

In 2020, Kresovich produced and co-wrote "How Could You Not Know" by Jocelyn Alice which appeared on Season 2 of the NBC television show, Songland. The final version of the song was co-written and produced with Shane McAnally, Ryan Tedder, and Ester Dean.

== Research Career ==
In 2022, Kresovich joined NORC at the University of Chicago as a Research Scientist. There, he leads behavioral health research projects as a member of the Social Data Collaboratory in the Public Health Department.

In 2025, Kresovich published a study in JAMA investigating the prevalence of undisclosed prescription drug promotion on social media platforms. The study, which analyzed high-engagement posts regarding GLP-1 agonists (such as Ozempic) and ADHD stimulants, found that over 80% of such content contained potential undisclosed influencer marketing.

== Business Ventures ==
In addition to his music and academic work, Kresovich serves as Partner and Chief Strategy Officer for The Cut Buddy, a personal grooming company that appeared on the ABC television show Shark Tank in November 2017.

== Awards and honors ==
Year	Award	Work	Result	
2019	Billboard Music Award	Top Rock Album	Pray for the Wicked	Won

== Education ==
Kresovich attended Cornell University, where he earned a Bachelor of Science (B.S.) degree in communication with Cum Laude honors. He earned a Master of Arts (M.A.) degree from the University of Georgia and a Doctor of Philosophy (PhD) degree from the University of North Carolina at Chapel Hill.

== Selected academic publications ==
- Kresovich, A.; Tran, H.; Shi, H.; Hayashi, K.; Dibble, M.R.; Martinez, L.; Emery, S.L. (2025). "High-Engagement Social Media Posts Related to Prescription Drug Promotion for 3 Major Drug Classes". JAMA. Published online November 13, 2025. doi:10.1001/jama.2025.19754. (Editor's Choice)
- Kresovich, A.; Borowiecki, M.; Emery, S.L.; Lamuda, P.A.; Taylor, B.G.; Schneider, J.A.; Pollack, H.A. (2025). "High stakes: Associations between substance use and gambling behaviors by race in the United States". Drug and Alcohol Dependence. 268 112581. doi:10.1016/j.drugalcdep.2025.112581. PMC 11849052. PMID 39919502.
- Kresovich, A.; Balawajder, E.F.; Pyatt, T.; Lamuda, P.A.; Taylor, B.G.; Walters, S.; Pollack, H.A.; Schneider, J.A. (2025). "Exploring the roots of stigma: A qualitative investigation of the American public's attitudes toward individuals with opioid use disorder". Health Communication: 1–14. doi:10.1080/10410236.2025.2540953. PMID 40790831.
- Kresovich, A.; Borowiecki, M.; Lamuda, P.A.; Taylor, B.G.; Emery, S.L.; Schneider, J.A.; Pollack, H.A. (2024). "Passive exposure to opioid crisis information and public attitudes: effects on local policy support, discrimination, and stigma in a United States national survey". Preventive Medicine. 191 108212. doi:10.1016/j.ypmed.2024.108212. PMC 11761358. PMID 39706487.
- Golan, O.; Kresovich, A.; Drymon, C.; Ducharme, L.; Flanagan Balawajder, E.; Borowiecki, M.; Lamuda, P.; Taylor, B.; Pollack, H.; Schneider, J. (2024). "Public perceptions of opioid misuse recovery and related resources in a nationally representative sample of U.S. adults". Addiction. 120 (2): 253–265. doi:10.1111/add.16692. PMC 11710964. PMID 39428591.
- Kresovich, A.; Reffner Collins, M.K.; Riffe, D.; Dillman Carpentier, F.R. (2021). "Mental health discourse in popular rap music: A longitudinal content analysis". JAMA Pediatrics. 175 (3): 286–292. doi:10.1001/jamapediatrics.2020.5155. PMC 7921905. PMID 33284350.

== Selected production discography ==
=== Panic! at the Disco – Pray for the Wicked ===
- "King of the Clouds" (Single)

=== Cee Lo Green – Heart Blanche ===
- "Thorns"

=== Hoodie Allen – People Keep Talking ===
- "Against Me" (featuring MAX)

=== Niykee Heaton – Promotional Singles ===
- "Cold War" (Promotional Single)
- "Kill 'Em All" (Promotional Single)
- "Remember It All"

=== Chris Webby – Chemically Imbalanced ===
- "Nice 2 Be Back"
- "Blue Skies" (featuring Anna Yvette) (Promotional Single)

=== Jocelyn Alice – Songland Season 2 ===
- "How Could You Not Know?" (Original Version)
- "How Could You Not Know?" (Final Version co-written/produced with Shane McAnally, Ryan Tedder, and Ester Dean)

=== Snow Tha Product – The Rest Comes Later ===
- "Bad Bitches" (Single)

=== NBA 2K12 – NBA 2K12 Official Soundtrack ===
- Alex K., D.J.I.G. - Now's My Time (2K Original)
