= The Budos Band III =

Studio album by the Budos Band
- Released: August 10, 2010
- Genres: Afrobeat, funk, soul
- Label: Daptone
- Producers: Bosco Mann; TNT

The Budos Band chronology
The Budos Band EP (2009)	The Budos Band III (2010)	Burnt Offering (2014)

Professional ratings
Aggregate scores
Source	Rating
Metacritic	85/100
Review scores
Source	Rating
AllMusic	4/5 stars
The A.V. Club	B+
Cokemachineglow	83%
Consequence of Sound	4/5 stars
Now	3/5 stars
Pitchfork	7.6/10
PopMatters	9/10
URB	4/5 stars
Uncut	4/5 stars

The Budos Band III is the third self-titled album by Staten Island, New York-based group the Budos Band. It was released on 2010 through Daptone Records. The New Yorker pop music critic Sasha Frere-Jones named it his favorite album of 2010.

== Track listing ==
No.	Title	Length
1.	"Rite of the Ancients"	3:48
2.	"Black Venom"	3:32
3.	"River Serpentine"	3:10
4.	"Unbroken, Unshaven"	2:59
5.	"Nature's Wrath"	4:53
6.	"Golden Dunes"	3:17
7.	"Budos Dirge"	2:38
8.	"Raja Haje"	3:57
9.	"Crimson Skies"	3:35
10.	"Mark of the Unnamed"	3:59
11.	"Reppirt Yad"	2:57
