= Say Amen (Saturday Night) =

- Sweater Beats remix artwork

Single by Panic! at the Disco

from the album Pray for the Wicked
- B-side: "(Fuck A) Silver Lining"
- Released: March 21, 2018
- Recorded: 2017–18
- Genre: Pop rock; pop
- Length: 3:09
- Label: Fueled by Ramen; DCD2
- Songwriters: Brendon Urie; Jake Sinclair; Sam Hollander; Lauren Pritchard; Imad Royal; Andrew Greene; Mike Deller; Brian Profilio; Thomas Brenneck; Daniel Foder; Jared Tankel; Nathan Abshire; Suzy Shinn; Tom Peyton; Tobias Wincorn
- Producers: Jake Sinclair; Imad Royal; Tobias Wincorn

Panic! at the Disco singles chronology
"Death of a Bachelor" (2016)	"Say Amen (Saturday Night)" (2018)	"High Hopes" (2018)

Music video
- "Say Amen (Saturday Night)" on YouTube

"Say Amen (Saturday Night)" is a song by American pop rock solo project Panic! at the Disco from their sixth studio album, Pray for the Wicked (2018). It was released as the lead single for the album on March 21, 2018. The song became Panic! at the Disco's first number one single on the Billboard Alternative Songs chart in June 2018.

== Release ==
"Say Amen (Saturday Night)" was released for digital download and streaming on March 21, 2018, and was produced by Jake Sinclair and Imad Royal. On the same day, the promotional single "(Fuck A) Silver Lining" was released. The song became Panic! at the Disco's first number one single on the Billboard Alternative Songs chart in June 2018.

== Sound and lyrics ==
"Say Amen (Saturday Night)" is a pop rock song with influences of hip hop and electronica with a "dizzying swirl of synth-strings and pitch-shifted vocal samples." The track "features one of Urie's strongest vocal performances to date." The song is known for Urie's famous A5 to B5 near the end. It is written in the key of F-sharp minor.

== Music video ==
Directed by Daniel "Cloud" Campos, the music video for "Say Amen (Saturday Night)" premiered on March 21, 2018. Panic! at the Disco frontman Brendon Urie confirmed that the music video serves as a prequel to the band's 2013 music video, "This Is Gospel", from the band's fourth studio album Too Weird to Live, Too Rare to Die! and the 2015 music video for "Emperor's New Clothes", from the band's fifth studio album Death of a Bachelor.

The video begins with a news report explaining that an artifact (called "The Devil's Key") has been stolen. It cuts to a mob of armed assassins breaking into Brendon Urie's home. Urie texts his girlfriend to delay her arrival and defeats the burglars by various comical and/or morbid means, such as lassoing them into fans by the neck or driving knives into their faces. Urie's girlfriend then arrives, whereupon they hug their way to the bedroom. When she notices the artifact hanging on Urie's chest by a necklace, she beats him and kills him with a bat. She steals the key from Urie's body as heartbeats reminiscing "This Is Gospel" are heard.

== Track listing ==
Digital download
No.	Title	Length
1.	"Say Amen (Saturday Night)"	3:09

Say Amen for Silver Linings
No.	Title	Length
1.	"Say Amen (Saturday Night)"	3:09
2.	"(Fuck A) Silver Lining"	2:49
Total length:		5:58

== Charts ==
=== Weekly charts ===
Chart (2018)	Peak position
Australia (ARIA)	90
Canada (Hot Canadian Digital Songs)	48
Canada Rock (Billboard)	35
Czech Republic Airplay (ČNS IFPI)	6
New Zealand Heatseekers (RMNZ)	2
Scottish Singles Sales (Official Charts)	37
UK Singles (Official Charts)	48
US Billboard Hot 100	60
US Hot Rock & Alternative Songs (Billboard)	5
US Rock & Alternative Airplay (Billboard)	4

=== Year-end charts ===
Chart (2018)	Position
US Hot Rock Songs (Billboard)	12
US Rock Airplay (Billboard)	8

== Certifications ==
Region	Certification	Certified units/sales
Australia (ARIA)	Gold	35,000^{‡}
Canada (Music Canada)	Gold	40,000^{‡}
New Zealand (RMNZ)	Gold	15,000^{‡}
United Kingdom (BPI)	Silver	200,000^{‡}
United States (RIAA)	Platinum	1,000,000^{‡}
^{‡} Sales+streaming figures based on certification alone.
