= (Fuck A) Silver Lining =

Promotional single by Panic! at the Disco

from the album Pray for the Wicked
- A-side: "Say Amen (Saturday Night)"
- Released: March 21, 2018
- Recorded: 2017–18
- Genre: Pop
- Length: 2:48
- Label: Fueled by Ramen; DCD2
- Songwriter(s): Brendon Urie; Jake Sinclair; Morgan Kibby; Scott Chesak; Johnny Funches; Marvin Junior
- Producer(s): Jake Sinclair; Scott Chesak

Audio video
- "(Fuck A) Silver Lining" on YouTube

"(Fuck A) Silver Lining" is a song by American pop rock band Panic! at the Disco. It is the opening track on their sixth studio album, Pray for the Wicked (2018), released as a promotional single for the album on March 21, 2018, along with the lead single, "Say Amen (Saturday Night)".

== Charts ==
=== Weekly charts ===
Chart (2018)	Peak position
New Zealand Heatseekers (RMNZ)	9
Scotland (OCC)	91
US Hot Rock & Alternative Songs (Billboard)	10

=== Year-end charts ===
Chart (2018)	Position
US Hot Rock Songs (Billboard)	60

== Certifications ==
Region	Certification	Certified units/sales
United States (RIAA)	Gold	500,000^{‡}
^{‡} Sales+streaming figures based on certification alone.
