= Viva Las Vengeance =

Studio album by Panic! at the Disco
- Released: August 19, 2022
- Recorded: 2019–2022
- Genres: Pop rock; glam rock; power pop; rock and roll; soft rock
- Length: 43:42
- Labels: Fueled by Ramen; DCD2
- Producers: Jake Sinclair; Mike Viola; Brendon Urie; Butch Walker

Panic! at the Disco chronology
| Pray for the Wicked (2018) | Viva Las Vengeance (2022) | Live in Denver (2025) |

Singles from Viva Las Vengeance
- 1. "Viva Las Vengeance" Released: June 1, 2022; 2. "Middle of a Breakup" Released: July 20, 2022; 3. "Local God" Released: August 5, 2022; 4. "Don't Let the Light Go Out" Released: August 16, 2022

Viva Las Vengeance is the seventh and final studio album by American pop rock solo project Panic! at the Disco. It was released on August 19, 2022, through Fueled by Ramen and DCD2 Records. It is their first studio album in four years, since their 2018 album, Pray for the Wicked, and the last album before the group's disbandment.

The album announced alongside the release of the lead single and title track "Viva Las Vengeance" on June 1, 2022, and was supported by a tour that began in North America in September 2022, and ended in Europe in March 2023.

== Background ==
Brendon Urie called the album "a look back at who I was 17 years ago and who I am now with the fondness I didn't have before. I didn't realize I was making an album and there was something about the tape machine that kept me honest." The album was also described as a "cinematic musical journey about the fine line between taking advantage of your youth, seizing the day, and burning out".

== Recording ==
Urie recorded Viva Las Vengeance live to an 8-track tape machine to capture a "retro vibe". The album was recorded with notable contributions from Jake Sinclair, Mike Viola, and Butch Walker in Los Angeles.

== Composition ==
Viva Las Vengeance has been described as pop rock, glam rock, power pop, rock and roll, and soft rock. The album also mixes new wave, punk, and baroque pop. It has also been considered to be a "classic-rock callback", adding to a "sound that showcases guitars and nods to the arena-rock sound of decades past, primarily the 1970s."

According to Chris Willman of Variety, while discussing the album's influences, "agreeable nods to the Police, Thin Lizzy, the Beatles and other late '60s/'70s/early '80s bands come fast and furious". The album is also noted for its similarities to Queen, with its "swooning theatricality and falsetto... sparkling guitar work, and well-timed harmonies". "Star Spangled Banger" and "God Killed Rock and Roll" have been cited as examples of Queen's influence.

== Release ==
In May 2022, a website called "Shut Up and Go to Bed" was set up, hinting at new music from Panic! at the Disco the following month. This was followed by the announcement of the single "Viva Las Vengeance" on May 29, 2022. On July 20, 2022, the second single "Middle of a Breakup" was released. On August 5, 2022, the third single "Local God" was released. On August 16, 2022, the fourth single "Don't Let the Light Go Out" was released. The album was released on August 19, 2022. On the same day, a music video for the song "Sad Clown" was released. On August 23, 2022, a music video for the song "Sugar Soaker" was released.

== Commercial performance ==
Viva Las Vengeance debuted at number thirteen on the US Billboard 200 selling 27,000 album-equivalent units in its first week.

== Critical reception ==
Professional ratings
Aggregate scores
| Source | Rating |
|---|---|
| AnyDecentMusic? | 6.9/10 |
| Metacritic | 82/100 |
Review scores
| Source | Rating |
| AllMusic | 4.5/5 stars |
| Clash | 5/10 |
| Evening Standard | 4/5 stars |
| Hot Press | 7/10 |
| Kerrang! | 4/5 |
| NME | 4/5 stars |
| The Telegraph | 3/5 stars |

According to the review aggregator Metacritic, Viva Las Vengance received "universal acclaim" based on a weighted average score of 82 out of 100 from 7 critic scores. Matt Collar of AllMusic described the album as a "declaration to everything sumptuously mythic, exultant, tragic, and...silly about loving and aspiring to be a part of the rock'n'roll world". Emily Swingle of Clash noted that "[the album] does knock out some definite singalongs", but also noted that "there is something missing beneath the veneer of theatricality". David Smyth of called the album "A classic-rock riot," and compared the guitar solos to Brian May.

Edwin Mcfee of Hot Press described the album as "A love letter to rock's golden era." Ali Shutler of NME complimented the sound of the album stating, Panic! typically strive for precision and polish but with this album recorded live to tape... [it] sounds like it belongs on a jukebox rather than Spotify, but...Panic! strut between the worlds of new wave, rock'n'roll and punk with utmost confidence. The Telegraph noted that "[while] originality has never been Urie’s forte, his pearly-white star power and finger-clicking showmanship ably make up for it."

== Track listing ==
All tracks are written by Brendon Urie, Jake Sinclair, and Mike Viola, except where noted, and produced by all three, except "Viva Las Vengeance", produced by Sinclair, Viola, and Butch Walker.

Viva Las Vengeance track listing
| No. | Title | Writer(s) | Length |
|---|---|---|---|
| 1. | "Viva Las Vengeance" | | 3:27 |
| 2. | "Middle of a Breakup" | | 3:20 |
| 3. | "Don't Let the Light Go Out" | Urie; Sinclair; Butch Walker; Viola; Janis Ian | 3:49 |
| 4. | "Local God" | | 3:00 |
| 5. | "Star Spangled Banger" | | 3:09 |
| 6. | "God Killed Rock and Roll" | Urie; Sinclair; Viola; Morgan Kibby; Russ Ballard | 4:17 |
| 7. | "Say It Louder" | Urie; Walker; Sinclair; Viola | 3:30 |
| 8. | "Sugar Soaker" | Urie; Sinclair; Viola; Kibby | 3:11 |
| 9. | "Something About Maggie" | | 3:20 |
| 10. | "Sad Clown" | Urie; Sinclair; Viola; Kibby; Kristen Anderson-Lopez; Robert Lopez | 3:46 |
| 11. | "All by Yourself" | Urie; Sinclair; Viola; Eric Carmen | 4:18 |
| 12. | "Do It to Death" | Urie; Walker; Sinclair; Viola | 4:35 |
| Total length: | | | 43:42 |

== Personnel ==
Panic! at the Disco

- Brendon Urie – vocals, background vocals, drums, piano, Hammond organ, harpsichord, synthesizer, guitar

Additional musicians

- Mike Viola – background vocals, guitar, piano, Hammond organ, harpsichord, synthesizer
- Jake Sinclair – background vocals, bass, guitar, Hammond organ, synthesizer
- Butch Walker – piano ("Don't Let the Light Go Out"), guitar ("Don't Let the Light Go Out", "Say It Louder", "Do It to Death"), background vocals ("Don't Let the Light Go Out", "Star Spangled Banger")
- Rachel White – background vocals ("Star Spangled Banger", "God Killed Rock and Roll", "Say It Louder", "Sugar Soaker")

Technical

- Jake Sinclair – production
- Mike Viola – production
- Brendon Urie – production (2–12)
- Butch Walker – production (1)
- Bernie Grundman – mastering
- Claudius Mittendorfer – mixing (all except "Don't Let the Light Go Out"), recording
- Rachel White – recording
- John Sinclair – mixing ("Don't Let the Light Go Out")
- Johnny Morgan – production assistance
- Rouble Kapoor – production assistance
- Rob Mathes – orchestral arrangements and conducting

== Charts ==
Chart performance for Viva Las Vengeance
| Chart (2022) | Peak position |
|---|---|
| Australian Albums (ARIA) | 10 |
| Austrian Albums (Ö3 Austria) | 46 |
| Belgian Albums (Ultratop Flanders) | 20 |
| Belgian Albums (Ultratop Wallonia) | 70 |
| Canadian Albums (Billboard) | 70 |
| Dutch Albums (Album Top 100) | 34 |
| German Albums (Offizielle Top 100) | 18 |
| Hungarian Albums (MAHASZ) | 35 |
| Japanese Albums (Oricon) | 80 |
| Japanese Digital Albums (Oricon) | 23 |
| Japanese Hot Albums (Billboard Japan) | 64 |
| Portuguese Albums (AFP) | 34 |
| Scottish Albums (Official Charts) | 5 |
| Spanish Albums (Promusicae) | 85 |
| Swiss Albums (Schweizer Hitparade) | 46 |
| UK Albums (Official Charts) | 5 |
| US Billboard 200 | 13 |
| US Top Alternative Albums (Billboard) | 2 |
| US Top Rock Albums (Billboard) | 3 |

== Release history ==
Release dates and formats for Viva Las Vengeance
| Region | Date | Format | Label | Ref. |
|---|---|---|---|---|
| Various | August 19, 2022 | cassette; CD; digital download; streaming; vinyl | Fueled by Ramen; DCD2 | |
