= Garageband Superstar =

Studio album by Lauran Hibberd
- Released: August 19, 2022
- Genre: Pop rock; pop-punk; indie rock; post-rock
- Length: 38:01
- Label: Virgin Music
- Producer: Larry Hibbitt

Lauran Hibberd chronology
Garageband Superstar (2022)	Girlfriend Material (2024)

Garageband Superstar is the debut studio album by English singer-songwriter Lauran Hibberd from the Isle of Wight. It was released on 19 August 2022 through Virgin Music Label & Artist Services. Production was handled by Larry Hibbitt. It features guest appearances from DJ Lethal, Viji and Wheatus.

The album debuted at No. 24 on the Scottish Albums chart, No. 16 on the UK Albums Sales Chart, Np. 15 on the UK Physical Albums Chart, No. 12 on the UK Vinyl Albums Chart and No. 10 on the UK Record Store Chart.

== Critical reception ==
Professional ratings
Aggregate scores
Source	Rating
AnyDecentMusic?	7.4/10
Metacritic	69/100
Review scores
Source	Rating
Clash	6/10
DIY	4/5 stars
Dork	4/5 stars
NME	3/5 stars
The Line of Best Fit	9/10
Uncut	6/10
Under the Radar	7.5/10 stars
Upset	4/5 stars
XS Noize	8/10

Garageband Superstar was met with generally favorable reviews from music critics. At Metacritic, which assigns a normalized rating out of 100 to reviews from mainstream publications, the album received an average score of 69, based on six reviews. The aggregator AnyDecentMusic? has the critical consensus of the album at a 7.4 out of 10, based on eight reviews.

Lana Williams of The Line of Best Fit praised the album, writing: "filled with high-octane rock-infused instrumentation, demanding lyrics and strong vocal performances, Garageband Superstar is a truly impressive debut from the Isle of Wight's own brightly burgeoning scuzz-pop superstar". Ben Tipple of DIY called it "all fun without feeling frivolous, packing relatable substance into its genuinely jovial sound". Jamie MacMillan of Dork described the album as "a whirlwind journey through the world and mind of one of our brightest new indie pop stars, and Garageband Superstar delivers on all that potential and excitement (and then some)". Lori Gava of XS Noize wrote: "there is room for Hibberd to grow musically, but she can certainly hold her own on the lyric front. That ability is what grows the excitement to follow her trajectory". Caleb Campbell of Under the Radar called it "a debut that bursts with personality and irrepressible energy", adding "it doesn't seem like Hibberd is aiming to be the next Avril Lavigne, or Weezer, or Green Day. Rather she's on her way to staking out her own voice in the world of pop rock. She may still be writing tunes on Garageband in her bedroom, but these songs are built for big stages".

In mixed reviews, Finley Holden of Clash called the album "a bold, contained statement nonetheless, doubling down on her niche style with a few twists and turns brings us some truly great moments to cherish". El Hunt of NME wrote: "when she steers away from pastiche and fully delves into cataloguing the mundanity, pomposity and sheer ridiculousness of grotty Little England, she's at her best as a songwriter". Johnny Sharp of Uncut wrote: "if the reggae-metal of "I'm Insecure" is a little club-footed, the charisma of her delivery still wins through".

== Track listing ==
No.	Title	Length
1.	"Rollercoaster"	2:25
2.	"Still Running (5K)" (featuring DJ Lethal)	3:36
3.	"Step Mum"	2:08
4.	"Average Joe"	3:07
5.	"Hot Boys" (featuring Viji)	3:15
6.	"That Was a Joke"	3:22
7.	"Get Some"	3:17
8.	"Garageband Superstar" (featuring Wheatus)	3:19
9.	"Hole in the Head"	2:49
10.	"I'm Insecure"	3:42
11.	"Slimming Down"	2:45
12.	"Last Song Ever"	4:26
Total length:		38:01

== Charts ==
Chart (2022)	Peak position
Scottish Albums (OCC)	24
