= The Budos Band =

Eclectic retro funk-soul afrobeat instrumental big band from NYC, 2005–present

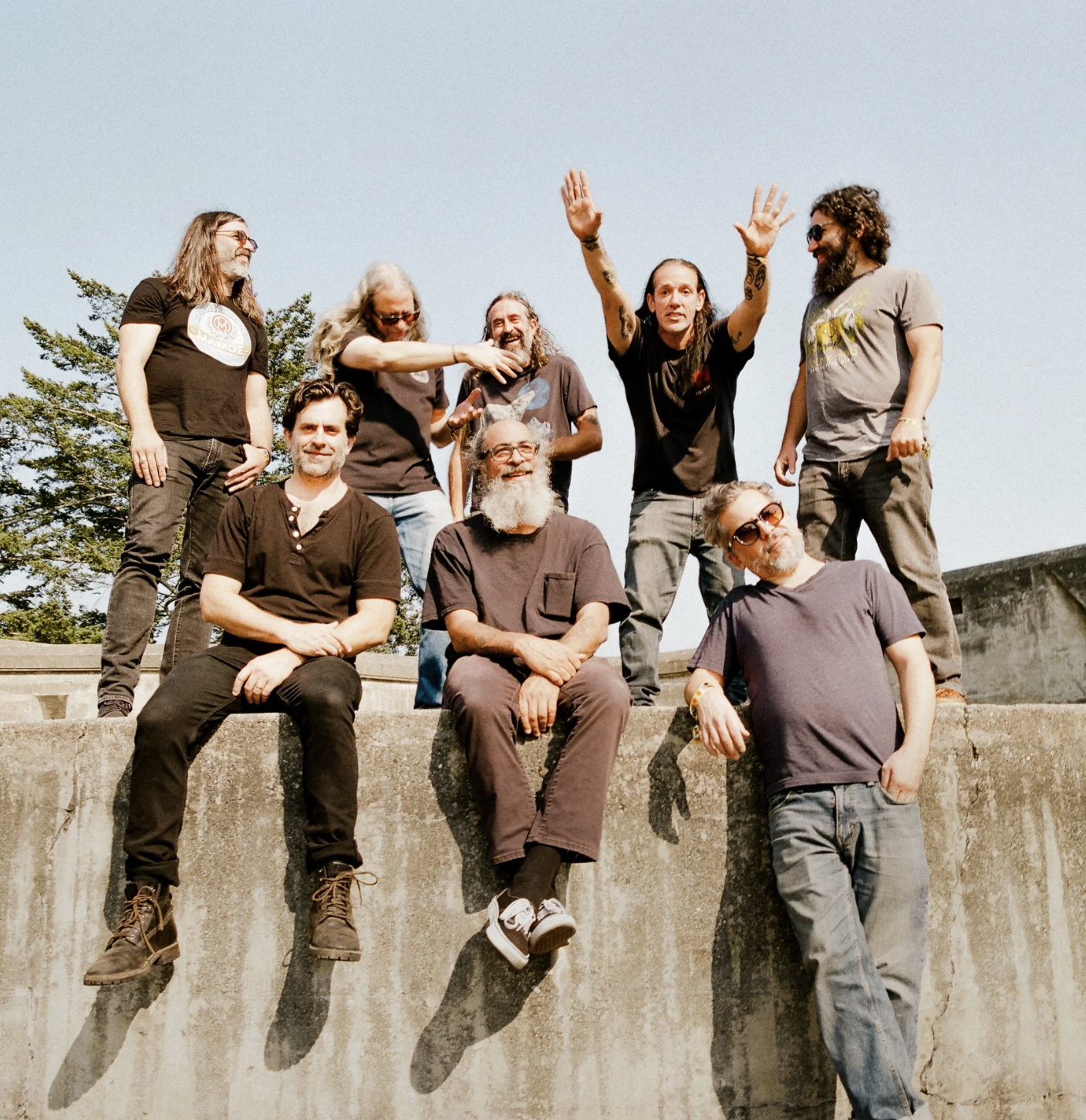
- Photo of The Budos Band by Dan Depew at THING Festival 2023

Background information
- Origin: Staten Island, New York, U.S. (Note: Although they technically originated in Brooklyn, they consider themselves a Staten Island band.)
- Genres: Afrobeat, funk, jazz, soul, afro-soul, psychedelic rock
- Years active: 2005 – present
- Label: Daptone Records
- Members: Jared Tankel; Thomas Brenneck; John Carbonella Jr. Mike Deller; Daniel Foder; Andrew Greene; Rob Lombardo; Brian Profilio; Dame Rodriguez; Richard Terrana
- Website: www.thebudos.com

The Budos Band is a North American instrumental band from Staten Island, New York, formed in 2005. AllMusic describes the group as a "doom rock Afro-soul big band with a '70s touch" that joins "musical universes from trippy psychedelia and Afro-funk to '70s hard rock and late-'60s soul." They have described themselves as "70's Psychedelic Instrumental Music," and "Afro-soul inspired by Ethiopian music with a soul undercurrent" and "sprinkled a little bit of sweet 60's stuff on top." One press release described the band as “sounding as if Quentin Tarantino was the music supervisor for a Bond film". Their more recent albums have incorporated sounds from 1970s jazz, funk, Afro-Beat, underground rock, and proto-metal. They have been signed to Daptone Records throughout their career.

== History ==
The Budos Band originated at a jam session at The Five Spot in Fort Greene, Brooklyn, hosted by Martín Perna of the New York band Antibalas. Some of the participants decided to form the new band, which has consisted of an occasionally floating lineup featuring David Guy and Andrew Greene (trumpets), Cochemea Gastelum (tenor sax), Jared Tankel (baritone sax), Dame Rodriguez and Vincent Balestrino (percussion), Thomas Brenneck (guitar), Robert Lombardo (congas), Mike Deller (organ), Daniel Foder (bass), and Brian Profilio and John Carbonella Jr. (drums). Their self-titled debut album was released in 2005 and featured guest appearances by Bosco Mann and Neal Sugarman.

The Budos Band II and The Budos Band III were released in 2007 and 2010, respectively. During this period the band members, in various permutations, backed several other acts associated with the Daptone label, including an acclaimed appearance on "Changes" by Charles Bradley. The fourth Budos Band album, Burnt Offering, was released in 2014 and was noted for incorporating elements from hard rock and heavy metal. The band was saddened by the deaths of labelmates Sharon Jones in 2016 and Charles Bradley in 2017, with some members moving to other states and starting families.

In 2019 some of the members reconvened to write and record their fifth album, Budos Band V. The album was further noted by critics for its diverse influences, being described by Kerrang! as "cinematic yet menacing, the soundtrack to a bad drug trip in the desert in a blaxploitation flick." The album also received positive reviews from Rolling Stone and New Noise. The latter described the Budos Band as "one [of] the best bands out there today. They bring a familiar vibe while standing defiantly unique." Their sixth album, Long in the Tooth, was released on October 9, 2020. Their seventh album, VII, was released on May 20, 2025.

== Discography ==
=== Studio albums ===
- The Budos Band (Daptone Records, 2005)
- The Budos Band II (Daptone Records, 2007)
- The Budos Band III (Daptone Records, 2010)
- Burnt Offering (Daptone Records, 2014)
- The Budos Band V (Daptone Records, 2019)
- Long in the Tooth (Daptone Records, 2020)
- VII (Diamond West Records, 2025)

=== EPs ===
- The Budos Band EP (Daptone Records, 2009)
- The Shape of Mayhem to Come (Live, Daptone Records, 2015)
- Frontier's Edge (Diamond West records, 2023)

=== Singles ===
- "Up from the South" / "T.I.B.W.F." (2005)
- "The Proposition" / "Ghost Walk" (2007)
- "More Mess on My Thing" / "Budos Theme" (with The Poets of Rhythm) (2006)
- "Day Tripper" / "Money" (with Sharon Jones & The Dap Kings) (2010)
- "Kakal" / "Hidden Hand" (2010)
- "Burnt Offering" / "Seizure" (2014)
- "Magus Mountain" / "Vertigo" (2015)
- "Maelstrom" / "Avalanche" (2019)
- "Gun Metal Grey" / "Long In The Tooth" (2020)

=== Other appearances ===
- "Up From the South" is featured in a commercial for the NFL Network (2013). "Up From the South" is also featured in a series of commercials for AT&T (2025).
- "T.I.B.W.F." is featured in a series of commercials for 1800 Tequila and in the sixth episode of This American Life.
- "The Chicago Falcon (Remix)" is featured on Wale's fourth mixtape, The Mixtape About Nothing (2008).
- "Budos Rising" and "The Proposition" are featured in MLB 09: The Show and MLB 10: The Show, respectively, for PlayStation consoles.
- "King Charles" is featured in episode 37 of the HBO TV series Entourage ("Manic Monday," Season 3).
- "Origin of Man," "Up From The South," "T.I.B.W.F." and "Hidden Hand" are featured in the movie New York, I Love You (2009).
- "Mas o Menos", "Ride or Die" and "Scorpion" are featured on the fictional radio station "Daptone Radio" in the game Sleeping Dogs by United Front Games and Square Enix London (2012).
- "The Volcano Song" is featured in the documentary I Knew It Was You: Rediscovering John Cazale (2009).
- "The Sticks" is featured in the background of a trailer for Destiny's Dark Below DLC (2014).
- "Say Amen (Saturday Night)" by Panic! At The Disco features an interpolation of "Aphasia" off of the album Burnt Offering.
- "Unbroken, unshaven" is the theme music for the Secretly Incredibly Fascinating podcast, hosted by comedian and writer Alex Schmidt. Another Budos Band song, "Chicago Falcon" was the theme music during Schmidt's tenure with The Cracked Podcast.
- "Old Engine Oil", "Black Venom", and "Aphasia" are featured in the Hulu series The Bear in 2022.

== Band members ==
- Jared Tankel – baritone saxophone
- Thomas Brenneck – electric guitar
- John Carbonella Jr. – congas, drums
- Mike Deller – organ
- Daniel Foder – bass guitar
- Andrew Greene – trumpet
- Rob Lombardo – bongos, congas
- Brian Profilio – drums
- Dame Rodriguez – percussion
- Richard Terrana – drums
