= List of songs recorded by Niykee Heaton =

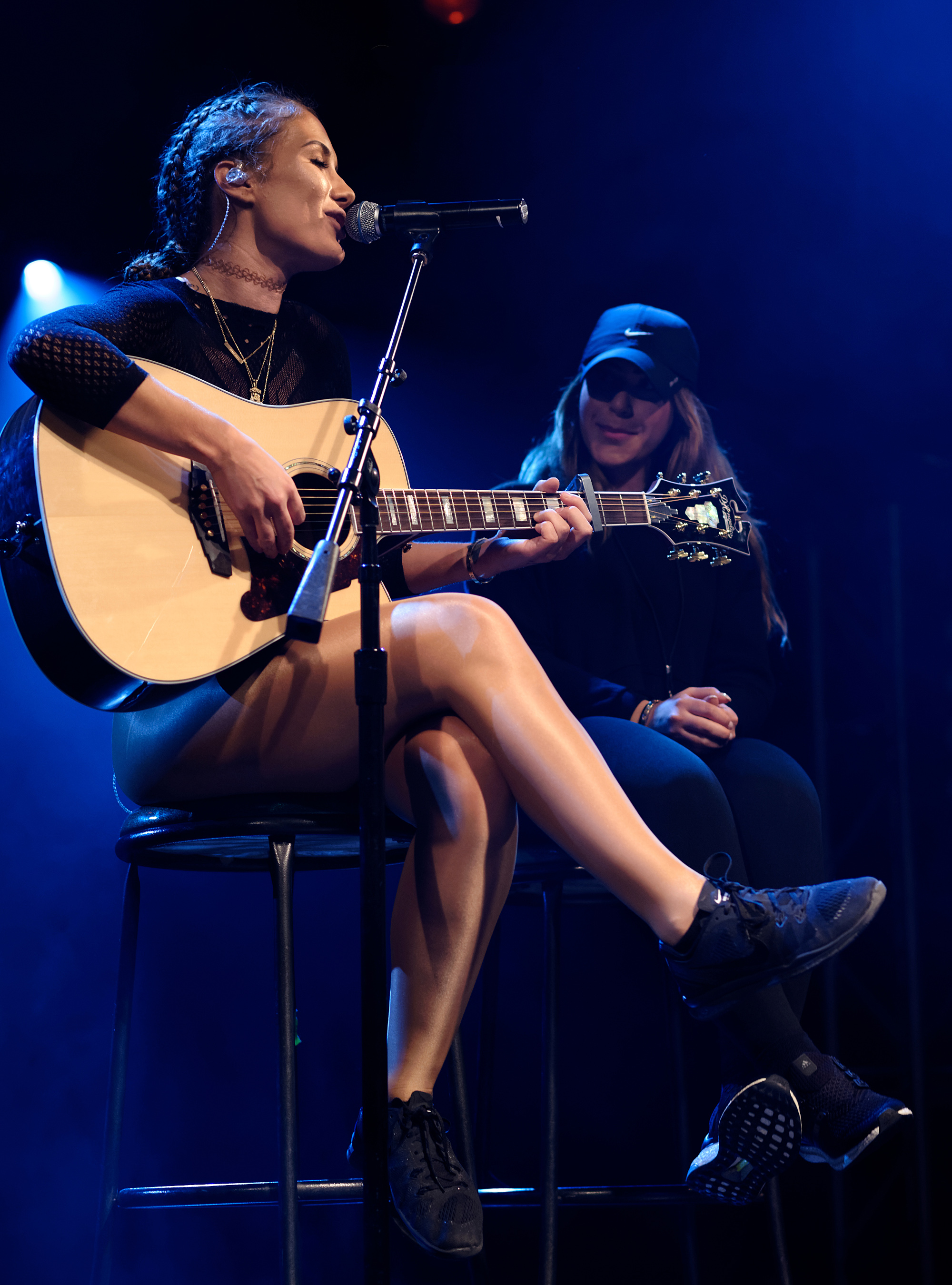
Heaton performing at the El Rey Theatre on December 18, 2015, as part of The Bedroom Tour

Niykee Heaton is an American singer-songwriter. She has written and recorded material since her childhood, having started sharing original songs occasionally on YouTube in 2011, for which she accompanied herself on acoustic guitar, along with covers of contemporary hits, where they subsequently went viral in following years, helping to propel the singer to prominence. Heaton released her debut project, an extended play titled Bad Intentions, in September 2014, after signing a record deal with Steve Rifkind and Russell Simmons's Capitol-affiliate All Def Digital, in partnership with Awesomeness Music. The EP garnered positive online reception, with The Huffington Post writing that it "offers a significant variety for a debut, all held together by her vocals, most ravishing in her lower register" and Idolator adding that it "confidently showcases the versatility and scope of Niykee's songwriting."

In 2015, she called out her label in an extensive open letter to her fans, later clarifying that "we are now in a place where we can create music that I want to create, and we are no longer tied to the people that were holding me back," also announcing plans to release her first album. In June, she launched a website, NBK (Naturyl Born Killers), stating "NBK is the movement," where new music was then premiered for free regularly over the following months through her SoundCloud account. On March 18, 2016, Heaton released The Bedroom Tour Playlist, through Capitol Records, a mixtape compiling remixed and remastered material she had shared online and debuted on live shows from her first headlining concert tour, The Bedroom Tour, in previous months.

== Songs ==
Songs recorded by Niykee Heaton
Song	Artist(s)	Writer(s)	Originating album	Year	Ref.
"21 Grams"	Niykee Heaton	Nicolet Heaton	None	2015	
"Ain't No Us"	Niykee Heaton	Nicolet Heaton	None	2015	
"Bad Boy" (Acoustic)	Niykee Heaton	Nicolet Heaton	None	2012	
"Bad Intentions"	Niykee Heaton	Nicolet Heaton; Geoffrey Early; Jeremy McArthur	Bad Intentions	2014	
"Bardot"	Niykee Heaton	Nicolet Heaton	None	2015	
"Best Thing Ever"	Niykee Heaton	Nicolet Heaton	None	2015	
"Boss"	Niykee Heaton	Nicolet Heaton	None	2013	
"Champagne"	Niykee Heaton	Nicolet Heaton; Nick Bailey; Ryan Ogren; Emily Warren	Bad Intentions	2014	
"Check On Me"	Niykee Heaton	Joe Trufant; Nicolet Heaton	None	2016	
"Cold War"	Niykee Heaton	Nicolet Heaton; Alex 'AK' Kresovich	None	2015	
"Devil"	Niykee Heaton	Nicolet Heaton	The Bedroom Tour Playlist	2016	
"Down"	Niykee Heaton	Nicolet Heaton	None	2015	
"Dream Team"	Niykee Heaton	Nicolet Heaton; Shane Lindstrom	The Bedroom Tour Playlist	2016	
"Fairy Princess" (Acoustic)	Niykee Heaton	Nicolet Heaton	None	2011	
"Fell in Love on the Dance Floor" (Acoustic)	Niykee Heaton	Nicolet Heaton	None	2012	
"Finer Things" (Remix)	Jake Lord and KydNice featuring Niykee Heaton	Nicolet Heaton	—N/a	2016	
"Finessin'" (Remix)	Baby E and Niykee Heaton	Ethan Lowery; Nicolet Heaton	None	2015	
"Forevermore" (Acoustic)	Niykee Heaton	Nicolet Heaton	None	2012	
"Gimme What I Want" (Acoustic)	Niykee Heaton	Nicolet Heaton	None	2013	
"Girlfriend" (Remix)	Niykee Heaton	Mike Posner; Mason Levy; Matthew Musto; Justin Bieber; Nicolet Heaton	None	2014	
"Heaven" (Acoustic)	Niykee Heaton	Nicolet Heaton	None	2012	
"I Believe In You" (Demo)	Niykee Heaton	Nicolet Heaton	None	2014	
"If I Told You" (Acoustic)	Niykee Heaton	Nicolet Heaton	None	2012	
"If They Only Knew" (Acoustic)	Niykee Heaton	Nicolet Heaton	None	2012	
"Infinity"	Niykee Heaton	Nicolet Heaton	The Bedroom Tour Playlist	2016	
"I'll Be Alright" (Acoustic)	Niykee Heaton	Nicolet Heaton	None	2012	
"I'm Ready"	Niykee Heaton	Nicolet Heaton	The Bedroom Tour Playlist	2016	
"Kill 'Em All"	Niykee Heaton	Nicolet Heaton; Alex 'AK' Kresovich	None	2014	
"King"	Niykee Heaton	Nicolet Heaton	The Bedroom Tour Playlist	2016	
"Let Me Go" (Demo)	Niykee Heaton	Nicolet Heaton	None	2014	
"Lions Den" (Acoustic)	Niykee Heaton	Nicolet Heaton	None	2012	
"Lullaby"	Niykee Heaton	Nicolet Heaton	The Bedroom Tour Playlist	2016	
"Made of Fire" (Acoustic)	Niykee Heaton	Nicolet Heaton	None	2012	
"Mask"	Niykee Heaton	Nicolet Heaton	The Bedroom Tour Playlist	2016	
"Me and You" (Acoustic)	Niykee Heaton	Nicolet Heaton	None	2012	
"NBK"	Niykee Heaton	Nicolet Heaton; Uforo Ebong	The Bedroom Tour Playlist	2016	
"Nexus"	Niykee Heaton	Nicolet Heaton; Shane Lindstrom	The Bedroom Tour Playlist	2016	
"One Time"	Niykee Heaton	Nicolet Heaton; Shane Lindstrom	The Bedroom Tour Playlist	2016	
"Out The Mud" (Remix)	Niykee Heaton	Kevin Gilyard; Maurice Simmonds; Andre Davidson; Sean Winston Davidson; Andrew Harr; Jerrel Jackson; Nicolet Heaton	The Bedroom Tour Playlist	2016	
"Perfect" (Acoustic)	Niykee Heaton	Nicolet Heaton	None	2012	
"Pray" (Acoustic Demo)	Niykee Heaton	Nicolet Heaton	None	2014	
"Psycho"	Niykee Heaton	Nicolet Heaton	None	2016	
"Rain Dog"	Niykee Heaton	Nicolet Heaton	None	2015	
"Remember It All"	Niykee Heaton	Nicolet Heaton; Alex 'AK' Kresovich	None	2014	
"Rolling Stone"	Niykee Heaton	Nicolet Heaton; Curtis Austin; Andre Harris; Mansur Zafr	Bad Intentions	2014	
"Say Anything" (Demo)	Niykee Heaton	Nicolet Heaton	None	2014	
"Say Yeah"	Niykee Heaton	Nicolet Heaton	The Bedroom Tour Playlist	2016	
"Skin Tight"	Niykee Heaton	Nicolet Heaton; Tommy Tysper; Emily Warren	Bad Intentions	2014	
"Sober"	Niykee Heaton	Nicolet Heaton; Michael Keenan; Emily Warren	Bad Intentions	2014	
"Spend It All" (Remix)	Euroz and Niykee Heaton	Euroz; Nicolet Heaton	None	2014	
"Start Me Up" (Acoustic)	Niykee Heaton	Nicolet Heaton	None	2012	
"Stoned In Miami" (Demo)	Niykee Heaton	Nicolet Heaton	None	2016	
"Summer of Renegades" (Acoustic)	Niykee Heaton	Nicolet Heaton	None	2012	
"Teach You" (Acoustic)	Niykee Heaton	Nicolet Heaton	None	2013	
"Till The Day I Die" (Acoustic)	Niykee Heaton	Nicolet Heaton	None	2012	
"Truth Is" (Acoustic)	Niykee Heaton	Nicolet Heaton	None	2012	
"Truth or Dare" (Acoustic)	Niykee Heaton	Nicolet Heaton	None	2012	
"Turn It On" (Acoustic)	Niykee Heaton	Nicolet Heaton	None	2012	
"Villa"	Niykee Heaton	Nicolet Heaton; Michael Keenan; Rick Markowitz; Emily Warren	Bad Intentions	2014	
"We Own It" (Remix)	Mike Posner, Niykee Heaton, Sammy Adams and T. Mills	Tauheed Epps; Cameron Jabril Thomaz; Alex Schwartz; Joe Khajadourian; Breyan Stanley Isaac; Mike Posner; Samuel Wisner; Travis Mills; Nicolet Heaton	None	2013	
"When We Touch" (Acoustic)	Niykee Heaton	Nicolet Heaton	None	2013	
"Winter Romance" (Acoustic)	Niykee Heaton	Nicolet Heaton	None	2012	
"Woosah"	Niykee Heaton	Nicolet Heaton	None	2015	
