= Lauran Hibberd =

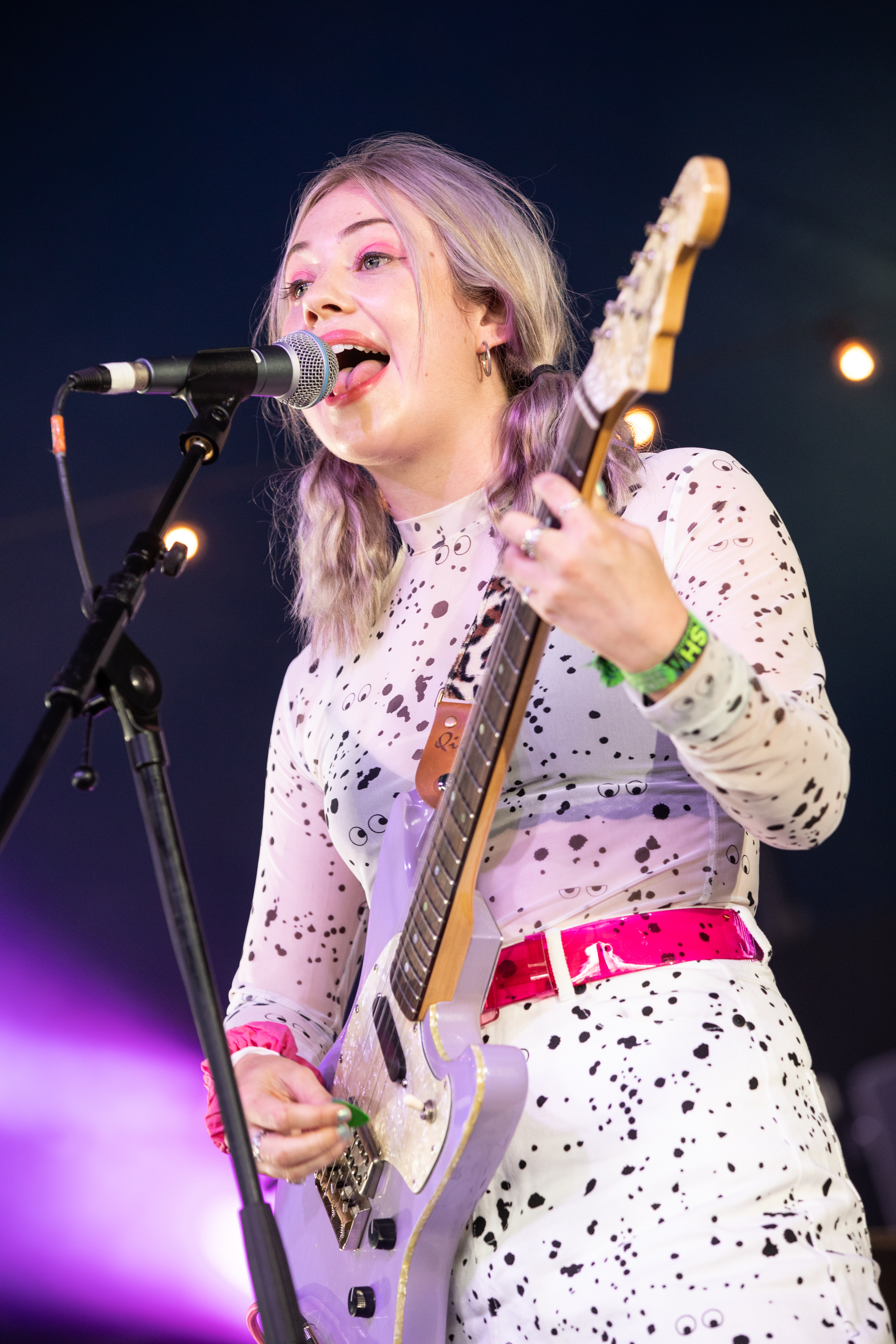
- Hibberd in 2019

Background information
- Born: 8 July 1997 (age 28); Isle of Wight, England
- Genres: Slacker pop, rock
- Instruments: Vocals, guitar
- Years active: 2015–present
- Labels: Be-Known; Dew Process; MNRK Music Group; Virgin Music
- Website: www.lauranhibberd.com

Lauran Amaly Hibberd (born 8 July 1997) is an English singer-songwriter from the Isle of Wight.

== Biography ==
Hibberd started playing the guitar at the age of 14, later telling Music Week "I write two songs a week, I always have".

Her breakthrough track was "Call Shotgun", which was playlisted on BBC Radio 1 in August 2018. This led to her playing the BBC Introducing stage at the Glastonbury Music Festival in 2019. She has accompanied US bands Hippo Campus and The Regrettes on the European legs of their tours, in addition to her own headline national tours.

Hibberd's music has often been described as "slacker pop".

== Discography ==
=== Albums ===
- Garageband Superstar (2022)
- Girlfriend Material (2024)

=== EPs ===
- ‘Favourite Shade of Blue’ (2017)
- Everything Is Dogs (2019)
- Goober (2021)

=== Singles ===
- "Fun Like This" (2018)
- "Call Shotgun" (2018)
- "What Do Girls Want?" (2018)
- "Sugardaddy" (2018)
- "Hoochie" (2019)
- "Frankie's Girlfriend" (2019)
- "Shark Week" (2019)
- "Sweat Patch" (2019)
- "Molly's Lips" (2019), cover of a song by the Vaselines, sent exclusively to mailing list members
- "Bang Bang Bang" (2020)
- "Old Nudes" (2020), also released in an acoustic version
- "Boy Bye" (2020), also released in an acoustic version
- "Rockin' Around the Christmas Tree" (2020), cover of song originally performed by Brenda Lee
- "How Am I Still Alive" featuring Lydia Night (2021)
- "Bleugh" (2021)
- "Charlie's Car" (2021)
- "Still Running (5K)" featuring DJ Lethal (2022)
- "Step Mum" (2022)
- "I'm Insecure" (2022)
- "That Was a Joke" (2022)
- "Hot Boys" featuring Viji (2022)
- "Honda Civic" (2023)
- "I Suck At Grieving" (2023)
- "Mary" (2023)
- "Pretty Good For A Bad Day" featuring Alex Gaskarth (2024)
- "2nd prettiest girl (in the world)" (2024)
- "Jealous" (2024)
