= Sam Hollander =

American record producer

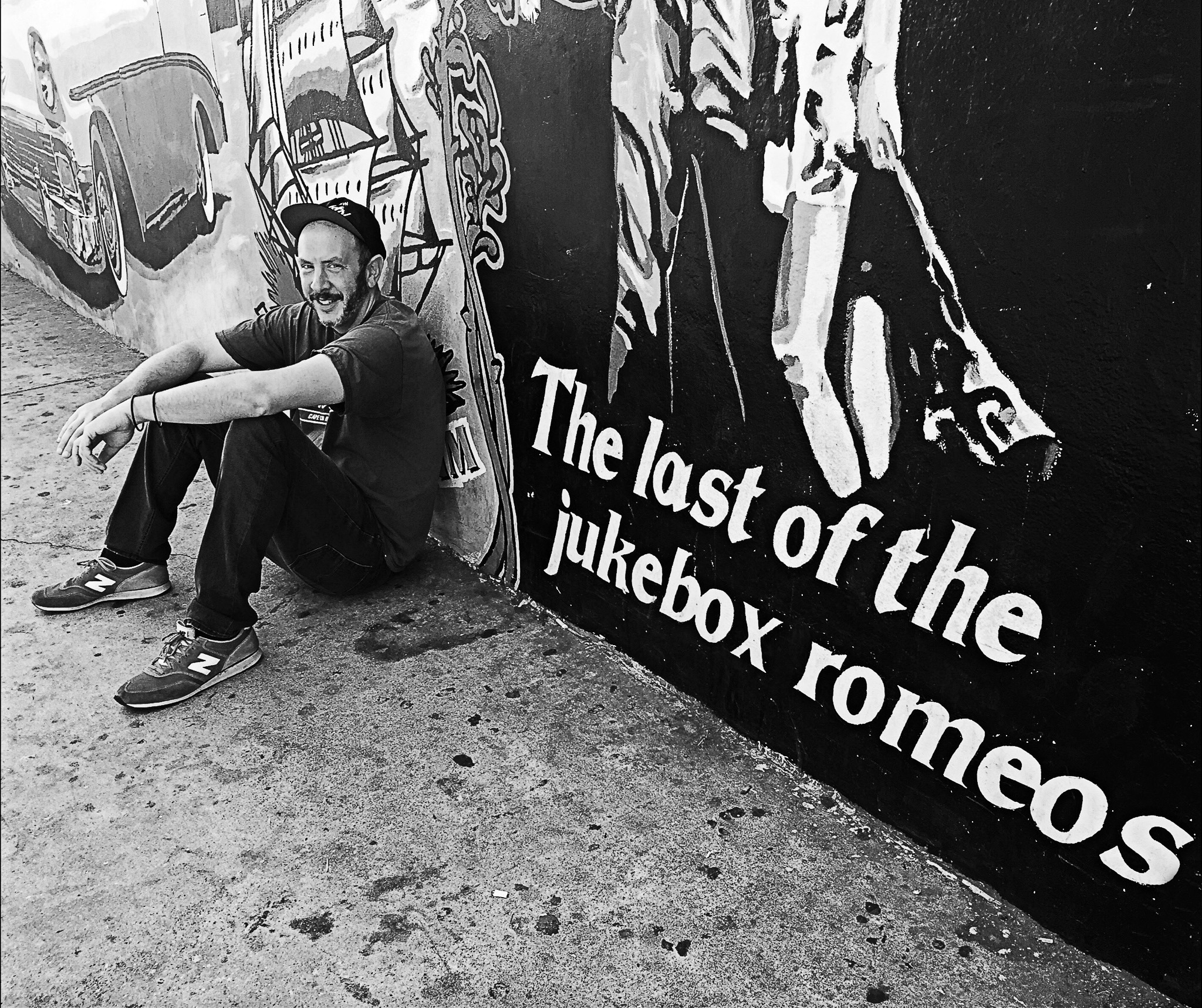
- Hollander in 2020

Background information
- Also known as: S*A*M
- Born: Samuel S. Hollander; New York City
- Origin: New York City, New York, U.S.
- Genres: Pop; pop rock; dance-pop; electropop; pop-rap
- Occupations: Songwriter; record producer; musician
- Instruments: Guitar; programming; vocals
- Years active: 1997–present
- Website: samhollandersongs.com

Sam Hollander is a multi-platinum American songwriter, producer, and author. He has collaborated with Panic! at the Disco, One Direction, Rob Thomas, Fitz and the Tantrums, Weezer, blink-182, Train, Ringo Starr, Carole King, Katy Perry, Boys Like Girls, Metro Station, Billy Idol, Def Leppard, Robert Randolph, Public Enemy, Daughtry, Gym Class Heroes, Tom Morello, Allen Stone among others.

== Career ==
As of 2025, Hollander has written or produced 30 singles certified Gold or Platinum by the Recording Industry Association of America (RIAA). His music has topped charts across the U.S. and worldwide, earning 14 Number 1s, 67 Top Five hits, and 111 Top 10 entries globally. His songs have been streamed more than 7 billion times.

In 2008, he was named Rolling Stone Hot List Producer of the Year, alongside Dave "Sluggo" Katz.

In 2012, he was the music producer for the NBC TV show Smash, for which he produced the Emmy-nominated song "I Heard Your Voice In A Dream.

In 2019, he held the #1 position on the Billboard Rock Songwriters chart for nine weeks, a year-end record.

In 2019, Hollander sold his songwriting catalog to Hipgnosis Songs Fund.

In 2025, he received an Emmy nomination at the 52nd Daytime Creative Arts Emmy Awards for Outstanding Original Song, as the composer of “Music Music” (performed by Noah Kahan) for Sesame Street.

He served as a Governor of the New York Chapter of The National Academy of Recording Arts and Sciences (The GRAMMYs) and currently serves on the Board of Directors for the charity Musicians On Call.

His memoir, "21 Hit Wonder: Flopping My Way To The Top Of The Charts", was released December 6, 2023 via Matt Holt/ BenBella/ Penguin Random House.

== Personal life ==
Hollander was born in New York, NY and attended Fox Lane High School. He is the son of interior decorator and collector, Judith Hollander, and José Limon Company dancer/Pratt Institute Professor, Michael Hollander, and the nephew of American poet John Hollander. In December 2013, Hollander wrote an obituary dedicated to his uncle in the New York Times entitled "My uncle, the poet and the pop star". As a child, Hollander was babysat by artist Andy Warhol, whose live-in boyfriend, Jed Johnson, had started a decorating business with his mother.

== Selected discography ==
- Panic! at the Disco "High Hopes" (Fueled By Ramen/Atlantic) (writer)
  - RIAA Diamond certified 10× PLATINUM, #4 US HOT 100, #1 US TOP 40, #1 US HOT AC, #1 US ALTERNATIVE, #1 US ROCK SONGS,
  - 2019 BILLBOARD MUSIC AWARDS ROCK SONG OF THE YEAR, 2× ASCAP Pop Award Winner
- Fitz and the Tantrums "HandClap" (Elektra) (writer)
  - RIAA certified 4× PLATINUM, #5 US HOT AC, #5 US ALTERNATIVE, #8 US ROCK SONGS, BMI Pop Award Winner
- Gym Class Heroes "Cupid's Chokehold" (Decaydance/Fueled By Ramen) (producer)
  - RIAA certified 5× PLATINUM, #1 US TOP 40, #3 UK TOP 40
- BANNERS "Someone To You" (Island) (writer)
  - RIAA certified 2× PLATINUM, BPI certified Platinum, #13 US HOT AC, 1 billion streams Spotify
- Panic! at the Disco "Hey Look Ma, I Made It" (Fueled By Ramen/Atlantic) (writer)
  - RIAA certified 2× PLATINUM, #1 US ROCK SONGS, #3 US HOT AC, #5 US ALTERNATIVE, #6 US TOP 40,
  - 2020 BILLBOARD MUSIC AWARDS ROCK SONG OF THE YEAR, 2019 TEEN CHOICE AWARDS ROCK SONG OF THE YEAR, ASCAP Pop Award Winner
- Metro Station "Shake It" (Columbia) (producer)
  - RIAA certified 2× PLATINUM, #3 US TOP 40
- One Direction "Rock Me" (Columbia/SYCO) (writer)
  - IFPI certified PLATINUM from the RIAA certified 3× PLATINUM album Take Me Home
- James TW "When You Love Someone" (Island Records) (writer)
  - RIAA certified GOLD, BPI certified Platinum
- Boys Like Girls "The Great Escape" (Columbia) (writer)
  - RIAA certified PLATINUM, #8 US TOP 40, BMI Pop Award winner
- We The Kings "Check Yes Juliet" (S-Curve/EMI) (writer/producer)
  - RIAA 3x certified PLATINUM / ARIA certified PLATINUM
- Weezer "Records" (Crush/Atlantic) (writer)
  - #1 US ALTERNATIVE
- Blink-182 "Blame It On My Youth" / "Happy Days" (Columbia) (writer)
  - #9 US ROCK SONGS
- Panic! at the Disco "Emperor's New Clothes" (Fueled By Ramen/Atlantic) (writer)
  - RIAA certified 2× PLATINUM
- Panic! at the Disco "Say Amen (Saturday Night)" (Fueled By Ramen/Atlantic) (writer)
  - RIAA certified PLATINUM, #1 US ALTERNATIVE, #1 US ROCK SONGS
- Train "Save Me San Francisco" (Columbia) (writer)
  - RIAA certified GOLD, #3 US AC, #7 US HOT AC, BMI Pop Award Winner
- Train "Marry Me" (Columbia) (writer)
  - RIAA certified 4× PLATINUM, #4 US HOT AC, BMI Pop Award Winner
- Goo Goo Dolls "Miracle Pill" (Warner Bros.) (writer)
  - #19 US HOT AC
- Boys Like Girls "Love Drunk" (Columbia) (writer)
  - RIAA certified PLATINUM, #8 US TOP 40
- Daughtry "Waiting for Superman" (RCA) (writer)
  - RIAA certified PLATINUM, #11 US HOT AC
- Katy Perry "If You Can Afford Me" (Capitol)
  - from the RIAA certified PLATINUM album One Of The Boys (writer/producer)
- Karmin "Acapella" (Epic) (writer)
  - RIAA certified GOLD / ARIA certified 3× PLATINUM
- Jewel "Grateful" (Crush) (writer)
- Carole King "Love Makes The World" (Koch) (writer/producer)
- Ringo Starr "Teach Me To Tango", "Thank God For Music", "Better Days" (Universal Music) (writer/producer)
- Def Leppard "Fire It Up" (Mercury Records) (writer)
- Billy Idol "Rita Hayworth" (Dark Horse Records) (writer)
- Violent Femmes "Holy Ghost", "Foothills", "Issues" (writer)
- Public Enemy "The Hits Keep On Coming", "March Madness" (writer/producer)
- Tom Morello ft. *Ben Harper "Raising Hell" (mom+pop) (writer)
- Tom Morello ft. *Barns Courtney "Human" (mom+pop) (writer)
- Almost Monday "Can't Slow Down" (Hollywood Records) (writer)
  - #1 US ALTERNATIVE, #21 US TOP 40, #12 US HOT AC
- Walk The Moon "Rise Up" (RCA) (writer)
- Saint Motel "Preach" (Elektra) (writer)
- The Band Camino "I Think I Like You" (Elektra) (writer)
  - #12 US HOT AC
- Panic! at the Disco "Roaring 20s" (Fueled By Ramen/Atlantic) (writer)
  - RIAA certified GOLD
- Panic! at the Disco "Crazy=Genius" (Fueled By Ramen/Atlantic) (writer)
  - RIAA certified GOLD
- Panic! at the Disco "Impossible Year" (Fueled By Ramen/Atlantic) (writer)
  - RIAA certified GOLD
- Panic! at the Disco "Golden Days" (Fueled By Ramen/Atlantic) (writer)
  - RIAA certified GOLD
  - from the GRAMMY-nominated RIAA certified 2× PLATINUM album Death of a Bachelor (writer)
- Panic! at the Disco "King Of The Clouds" (Fueled By Ramen/Atlantic) (writer)
  - RIAA certified GOLD
- Panic! at the Disco "Drunks", "Dancing's Not A Crime", "Old Fashioned" (Fueled By Ramen/Atlantic) (writer)
  - from the RIAA certified 2× PLATINUM album Pray for the Wicked
  - 2019 BILLBOARD MUSIC AWARDS ROCK ALBUM OF THE YEAR
- Gym Class Heroes "As Cruel as School Children" (Decaydance/Fueled By Ramen) (writer/producer)
  - RIAA certified GOLD
- The Academy Is "About A Girl" (Fueled By Ramen/Atlantic) (writer/producer)
  - RIAA certified GOLD
- Metro Station "Seventeen Forever" (Columbia) (producer)
  - RIAA certified GOLD
- Good Charlotte "Sex on the Radio" (Capitol) (writer)
  - ARIA certified PLATINUM
- Weezer "I Love The USA" (Crush/Atlantic) (writer)
- We The Kings "Say You Like Me" (S-Curve/EMI) (writer/producer)
  - RIAA certified PLATINUM
- We The Kings "Secret Valentine" (S-Curve/EMI) (writer/producer)
  - RIAA certified GOLD
- We The Kings "Skyway Avenue" (S-Curve/EMI) (writer/producer)
  - RIAA certified GOLD
- Pentatonix "Sing", "New Year's Day" (RCA) from the RIAA certified GOLD album Pentatonix (writer)
- Kelly Rowland "Daylight" (Columbia) (producer)
  - #5 UK R&B
- Olly Murs "Beautiful To Me" (Epic) from the BPI certified 2× PLATINUM album Never Been Better (writer)
- Delta Goodrem "Encore" (Sony) from the ARIA certified GOLD Wings of the Wild (writer)
- Chiddy Bang "Mind Your Manners" (Polydor) (writer/producer)
  - ARIA certified 2× PLATINUM
- Chiddy Bang "Happening" (Polydor) (writer/producer)
  - ARIA certified GOLD
- Chiddy Bang "Ray Charles" (Polydor) (writer/producer)
  - #13 UK TOP 40
- Macklemore "Next Year" (Bendo Records/Warner Bros.) (writer)
- Aloe Blacc "King Is Born" (Interscope) (writer/producer)
- Arashi Party Starters (J-Storm) (writer/producer) from the RIAJ certified 3× PLATINUM "This Is Arashi"
  - #7 JAPAN HOT 100
- Andy Grammer "Damn It Feels Good To Be Me" (S-Curve) (writer)
  - #14 US HOT AC
- Train "This'll Be My Year" (Columbia)
  - from the RIAA certified GOLD album California 37 (writer)
- The Fray "Same As You" (Epic) (writer)
- 311 "New Heights" (writer)
- Barenaked Ladies "Lookin Up" (Vanguard) (writer)
- Rob Thomas "Ghost" (Republic) (writer)
- Sugar Ray "Girls Were Made To Love" (Pulse) (writer/producer)
- Blues Traveler "Suzie Cracks the Whip" (429) (producer)
- Uncle Kracker "Hot Mess" (Atlantic) (writer/producer)
- Matt Nathanson "Earthquake Weather" "Heart Starts" (Vanguard) (writer)
- Michael Franti & Spearhead "Wherever You Are", "I Don't Wanna Go" (Capitol) (writer)
- Rebelution "Santa Barbara" (Easy Star Records) from the GRAMMY nominated "Falling Into Place (writer)"
- G. Love & Special Sauce f/ Keb Mo & Robert Randolph "Birmingham"
  - from the GRAMMY nominated album "The Juice" (writer)
- Robert Randolph "All Night Lover" from the GRAMMY nominated album "Preacher Kids" (writer)
- The Record Company "How High" (Concord Records) (writer)
  - #4 US AAA
- The Revivalists "How We Move" (Concord Records) (writer)
- Matisyahu "Happy Hannukah," "Champion" (writer)
- O.A.R. "Lay Down" (Lava) (writer)
- Trombone Shorty "Dream On" (Verve) (writer/producer)
- Allen Stone "Symmetrical" (Capitol Records) (writer)
- Brett Dennen "Out Of My Head" (Atlantic) (writer)
- Old 97's "Somebody" (ATO Records) (writer)
- Andrew McMahon in the Wilderness "Canyon Moon" (Vanguard Records) (writer)
- Neon Trees "Your Surrender", "I Am The DJ" (Island Records) (writer)
  - #18 US HOT AC
- DNCE "Can You Feel It" (RCA) for the movie and soundtrack "My Little Pony: The Movie (writer)
- Capital Cities "Venus & River" (Capitol) (writer)
- Coheed and Cambria "The Running Free" (Columbia) (writer)
  - #19 US ALTERNATIVE
- Hollywood Undead "Hear Me Now" (Octone Records) (writer/producer)
  - RIAA certified GOLD
- Owl City "Speed of Love" (Universal Republic) (writer)
- American Authors "Microphone" (Island) (writer)
- Fitz and the Tantrums "Roll Up", "Run It", "Get Right Back" (Elektra Records)(writer)
- The Struts "Freak Like You" (Interscope) (writer/producer)
- Daughtry "Battleships" (RCA) from the RIAA certified GOLD album Baptized (album) (writer)
  - #20 US HOT AC
- Cobra Starship "Bring It (Snakes on a Plane)" (Decaydance/New Line)
  - for the movie and soundtrack "Snakes on a Plane (writer/producer)
- All Time Low "Lost in Stereo" (Interscope)
  - from the RIAA certified GOLD album Nothing Personal (writer/producer)
- All Time Low "Holly (Would You Turn Me On" (Interscope)
  - from the RIAA certified PLATINUM album So Wrong, It's Right (writer)
- Arrested Development "Since The Last Time" (Edel/Pony Canyon) (writer/producer)
- The Virgins "The Virgins" (Atlantic) (producer)
- Bowling For Soup "Only Young" (Jive Records) (writer)
- Hot Chelle Rae "Honestly" (RCA) (writer/producer)
- Big Time Rush "Til' I Forget About You" (Columbia)
  - RIAA certified GOLD (writer/producer)
- Big Time Rush "Big Night" (Columbia)
  - from the RIAA certified GOLD album BTR (writer/producer)
- Descendants 2 "Ways To Be Wicked" (Hollywood) (writer/producer)
  - RIAA certified PLATINUM
- Descendants "Set It Off" (Hollywood)
  - from the RIAA certified GOLD album (writer/producer)
- Glee Cast "Rise" (Columbia) for the show Glee (writer)
- SMASH Cast “Voice In A Dream" (Columbia) for the show SMASH (producer)
  - EMMY NOMINATED
- Static Revenger "Happy People" (Ministry of Sound) (writer)
  - #23 UK TOP 40
- Cooler Kids "All Around The World" (DreamWorks) The Lizzie McGuire Movie
  - RIAA certified PLATINUM (writer/producer)
- Blake Lewis "Heartbreak on Vinyl" Tommy Boy) (writer/producer)
  - #1 US DANCE CLUB PLAY, #1 US DANCE AIRPLAY
- Sadie Stanley "Call Me, Beep Me" (Walt Disney Records) for the TV movie "Kim Possible" (producer)
- Toothpick "Super Size Me" for the ACADEMY AWARD nominated documentary Super Size Me (writer/producer)
- Under the Rug (band) "mad girl's love song", "i don't want to cry in my car anymore", "you are a body" (writer)
