= Jake Sinclair (musician) =

American songwriter (born 1985)

- Born: Jacob Scott Sinclair; March 7, 1985 (age 41); Boise, Idaho, U.S.
- Genres: Pop; pop rock; alternative rock
- Occupations: Musician; singer; songwriter; record producer; audio engineer
- Instruments: Guitar; bass; piano; percussion; vocals
- Years active: 2003–present
- Formerly of: The Films
- Spouse: Kate Micucci (m. 2018)
- Website: jakesinclair.com

Jacob Scott Sinclair (born March 7, 1985) is an American musician, record producer, singer, audio engineer, and songwriter. His production and songwriting credits include Weezer, Fall Out Boy, Panic! at the Disco, 5 Seconds of Summer, Pink, New Politics, Andrew McMahon in the Wilderness, Gin Wigmore, and Train.

== Career ==
After writing and producing his first RIAA Gold single with New Politics ("Harlem"), followed by his first RIAA Platinum single with 5 Seconds of Summer ("She Looks So Perfect"), Sinclair moved into his own studio in Echo Park. There he produced Panic! At the Disco's #1 album Death of a Bachelor and Weezer's White Album. He is performing on tour with Beck.

Sinclair co-wrote and produced Panic! at the Disco's Pray for the Wicked and Death of a Bachelor albums (which debuted at number one on the US Billboard 200) and produced Weezer's 2016 Weezer (White Album). Both were nominated for Best Rock Album at the 59th Annual Grammy Awards. He co-wrote and produced "Uma Thurman" by Fall Out Boy, which debuted at number one on the U.S. iTunes Chart, reached number 22 on the Billboard Hot 100, and was certified 2× Platinum by the RIAA in December 2015. Sinclair received a Grammy nomination for Album of the Year for his work as engineer and bassist on Taylor Swift's "Everything Has Changed" alongside producer Butch Walker. He co-wrote and produced the debut single, "She Looks So Perfect" by 5 Seconds of Summer that peaked at number one in over five countries and won Song of the Year at the 2014 ARIA Awards. Sinclair is the former bassist of the indie/pop rock band The Films and the lead singer and producer of the indie pop duo Alohaha. In November 2018 Sinclair won the Spotify Secret Genius Award for best rock producer.

== Personal life ==
Sinclair is married to actress Kate Micucci. They had a son in January 2020. They live in Los Angeles and New York with their dog Claire.

== Discography ==
Year	Artist	Title	Label	Role
2022	Panic! at the Disco	Viva Las Vengeance	Fueled by Ramen, DCD2	Producer, composer
2022	Weezer	SZNZ: Spring	Atlantic Records	Producer
2021	Weezer	OK Human	Atlantic Records	Producer
2019	Weezer	"Lost In The Woods (Weezer Version)"	Walt Disney Records	Producer
2019	Fall Out Boy	"Bob Dylan"	DCD2, Island	Producer
2019	Panic! at the Disco	"Into The Unknown (Panic! at the Disco Version)"	Walt Disney Records	Producer
2018	Panic! at the Disco	Pray For The Wicked	Fueled by Ramen	Producer
2016	Weezer	Weezer	Atlantic Records	Producer
2016	Panic! at the Disco	Death of a Bachelor	Fueled by Ramen	Producer (all tracks except "Don't Threaten Me with a Good Time" and "Hallelujah"), composer, background vocals ("Victorious", "Hallelujah")
2016	Sia	"Reaper", "House on Fire"	Inertia	Producer
2015	Courtney Love	"Miss Narcissist"	Ghost Ramp	Producer, engineer, guitar, bass
2015	Lolo	Comeback Queen (EP)	DCD2, Universal, Island	Producer, bass, guitar
2015	Fall Out Boy	American Beauty/American Psycho	DCD2, Island	Composer, Producer
2015	Fall Out Boy	"Uma Thurman" (ft. Wiz Khalifa), "Fourth of July" ft. OG Maco	DCD2, Island	Producer, engineer, keyboards, percussion, programming, vocals (background), additional production, mixing
2015	Fall Out Boy	Make America Psycho Again (remix album)	DCD2, Universal, Island	Composer, producer (all tracks except "American Beauty/American Psycho")
2015	Hey Violet	I Can Feel It	Hi or Hey Records	Producer
2015	White Sea	"Stay Young, Get Stoned"	Downey, Obscura	Producer, bass, guitar
2015	Matt Nathanson	Show Me Your Fangs	Vanguard Records	Composer ("Headphones" ft. Lolo), mixer
2015	Alohaha	Welcome to Your New Life	—	Vocals, guitar, bass
2015	Harry Connick, Jr.	That Would Be Me	Marsalis Music	Bass, engineer
2015	New Politics	Vikings	DCD2, Warner Bros. Records	Producer, engineer, mixer, vocal engineer; composer ("Girl Crush," "Lovers in a Song," "15 Dreams," "Pretend We're in a Movie," "Aristocrat")
2014	5 Seconds of Summer	"She Looks So Perfect"	Capitol, Hi or Hey	Composer, producer, engineer, guitar, programming, mixing, vocals (background)
2014	Andrew McMahon	"Cecilia and the Satellite"	Vanguard Records	Mixing, additional production
2014	Henry Jackman	Big Hero 6 (Original Motion Picture Soundtrack)	Walt Disney Records	Mixing, programming, additional Production
2014	Train	"Cadillac, Cadillac," "Angel in Blue Jeans," "Give It All," "Wonder What You're Doing for the Rest of Your Life" (ft. Marsha Ambrosius), "Son of a Prison Guard," "Just a Memory"	Columbia Records	Producer, musician, additional production, engineer
2014	Gavin DeGraw	Finest Hour: The Best of Gavin DeGraw	RCA	Bass, engineer, vocals (background)
2014	Travie McCoy	"Keep On Keeping On"	Decaydance, Fueled by Ramen, Nappy Boy, Atlantic	Engineer, mixing, composer
2014	Christina Perri	Head or Heart	Atlantic Records	Engineer
2014	MAX	"Streets of Gold"	DCD2, Crush	Producer, programming, bass, composer, drums, engineer, keys, mixing, percussion
2013	New Politics	"Harlem"	RCA	Producer, bass, composer, engineer, guitar, mixing, percussion, programming, synthesizer, vocals (background)
2013	Daughtry	"Traitor"	RCA Records	Bass, composer, drums, engineer, producer, programming, vocals (background)
2013	Big B	"Here Comes the Lightning"	Suburban Noize Records	Composer, producer
2013	Keith Urban	"Even the Stars Fall 4 U," "Heart Like Mine"	Capitol Nashville	Bass, engineer, keyboards, percussion, programming
2013	Matt Nathanson	"Mission Bells"	Vanguard Records	Producer, composer, mixing, guitar, drums, programming, vocals (background), bass
2013	Gavin Degraw	"I'm Gonna Try," "Heartbreak"	RCA	Bass, engineer
2013	Fall Out Boy	"My Songs Know What You Did in the Dark (Light Em Up)"	Island Records	Engineer, keyboards, percussion, programming, vocals (background)
2013	Panic! at the Disco	"This Is Gospel"	Decaydance, Fueled by Ramen	Engineer, mixing, composer
2012	Chiddy Bang	"Handclaps & Guitars"	IRS, Parlophone, EMI	Composer, vocals
2012	Train	"Drive By"	Columbia, Syco	Engineer, programming
2012	Shovels & Rope	"Birmingham"	Dualtone, Dine Alone	Mixing
2012	Taylor Swift	"Everything Has Changed"	Big Machine, Republic	Bass, engineer, vocals (background)
2012	The Avett Brothers	"Down With the Shine"	American	Engineer
2012	Pink	"My Signature Move"	RCA	Composer, engineer, mixing, producer, vocals (background)
2012	Lit	The View from the Bottom	Megaforce	Engineer
2011	Avril Lavigne	"Alice"	Buena Vista Records	Engineer
2011	Gin Wigmore	"Black Sheep"	Universal, Mercury Records	Engineer, composer, drums, guitar (bass), organ, percussion, piano, synthesizer, vocals (background), whistle
2011	Weezer and Hayley Williams	"Rainbow Connection"	Walt Disney Records	Engineer
2011	Gavin DeGraw	"Soldier"	RCA Records	Bass, engineer
2011	Eulogies	Tear the Fences Down	Dangerbird	Producer, engineer, mixing
2011	Butch Walker and the Black Widows	"Synthesizers"	Dangerbird	Bass, composer, producer, engineer, piano, vocals (background)
2011	The Wombats	"1996," "Walking Disasters"	14th Floor, Bright Antenna	Engineer
2011	Cary Ann Hearst	"Hell's Bells" (from True Blood: Music from the HBO Original Series, Vol. 3)	Dualtone Records	Main personnel
2011	Panic! at the Disco	Vices & Virtues	Decaydance, Fueled by Ramen	Engineer
2010	Hey Monday	Beneath It All	Decaydance, Columbia	Engineer
2010	Butch Walker and the Black Widows	I Liked It Better When You Had No Heart	One Haven Music	Producer, engineer, percussion, vocals (background), bass
2010	Mishka	Talk About	j.k. livin Records	Assistant engineer, engineer, guitar, mixing
2010	Never Shout Never	"Love is Our Weapon"	Loveway Records, Sire, Warner Bros. Records	Assistant engineer, engineer, guitar, mixing
2009	Plastiscines	"Barcelona"	Virgin France	Producer, composer
2009	Weezer	"(If You're Wondering If I Want You To) I Want You To"	XL, Geffen	Engineer
2009	Train	Save Me, San Francisco	Columbia Records	Engineer
