= Lonely Girl (Weezer song) =

Song by Weezer

from the album Everything Will Be Alright in the End
- Released: October 7, 2014
- Recorded: 2014
- Genre: Alternative rock, power pop
- Length: 2:49
- Label: Republic
- Songwriters: Rivers Cuomo, Josh Alexander
- Producer: Ric Ocasek

"Lonely Girl" is a song by the American rock band Weezer from their ninth studio album Everything Will Be Alright in the End. While the song has not been released as a single, it was the fourth song from the album to be publicly available on stream prior to release, after "Back to the Shack", "Cleopatra" and "The British Are Coming".

== Composition ==
A mid-tempo love song, Carolyn Menyes from Music Times described "Lonely Girl" as having "a "Buddy Holly"-like swing to the beat and the blend of heavy guitars mixed with a soft-singing Rivers Cuomo recalls distinctively The Green Album era". Ian Cohen at Pitchfork Media notes that the song "isolates the second verse of "Only in Dreams" and reworks Cuomo's Japanese curio "Homely Girl" into a legitimate buzzy throwback." Dan Reilly from Spin characterizes the song as more straightforward than "The British Are Coming", and more similar to "Back to the Shack". The song also contains "rowdy hooks and fast-paced gallop".

== Reception ==
Carolyn Menyes at Music Times states "'Lonely Girl' seems to blend together some of the best moments from Weezer's most beloved albums." Tom Breihan from Stereogum described it as "a fine example of the sort of supercharged power-pop that this band does so well when Rivers Cuomo is feeling motivated". Slant Magazine writer Blue Sullivan notes that the song "finds the band finally casting off its slacker straitjacket". Mattison Keesey of AltWire noted that the song is "without a doubt classic Weezer" and compared it to the albums Weezer (1994) and Pinkerton. Allan Raible from ABC News was more critical of the song, noting the "painfully easy rhyming sections".
