= Weezer Cruise =

2012 and 2014 music cruise

- Promotional poster for the 2012 cruise
- Genre: Rock
- Dates: January 19–23, 2012; February 13–17, 2014
- Venue: Carnival Destiny (2012); Carnival Fascination (2014)
- Locations: Miami to Cozumel (2012); Jacksonville, Florida to Freeport and Nassau, The Bahamas (2014)
- Years active: 2012, 2014
- Attendance: 2,200 (2012)
- Organiser: SixthMan

The Weezer Cruise was a music cruise hosted by the American rock band Weezer that was held in 2012 and in 2014. The cruise was organized by the company SixthMan and took place aboard cruise ships operated by the Carnival Cruise Line. The 2012 cruise took place from January 19 to 23 and consisted of a round trip from Miami to Cozumel aboard the Carnival Destiny, while the 2014 edition took place from February 13 to 17 and consisted of a round trip from Jacksonville, Florida, to the Bahamas aboard the Carnival Fascination, with stops in Freeport and Nassau. For both cruises, Weezer was joined by numerous supporting acts, with Ozma being the only other band to participate in both events. The cruises received positive reviews from music publications.

== Background ==
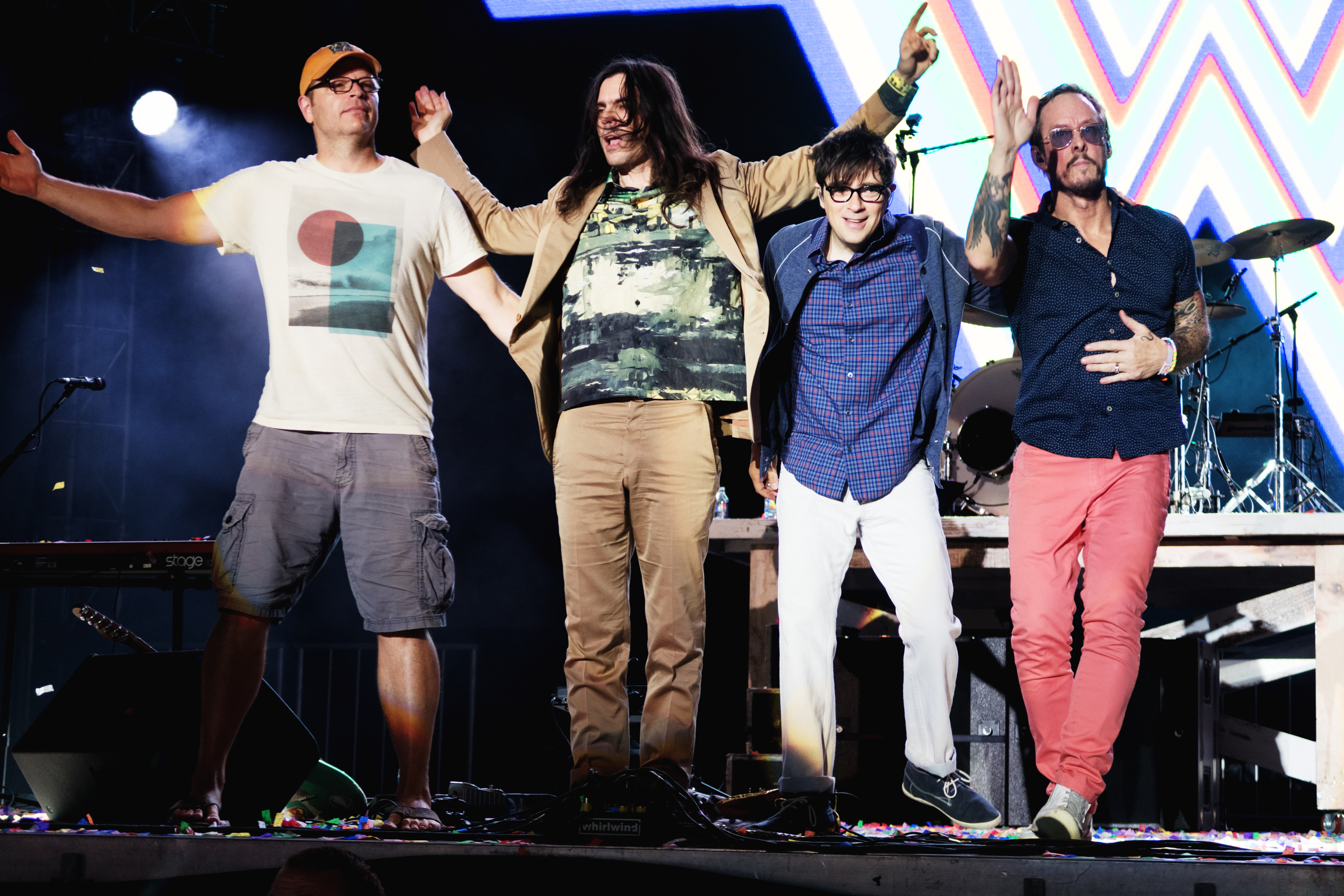
Weezer in 2017

On July 12, 2011, the American rock band Weezer announced plans for a music cruise that would take place in 2012. The cruise, which was organized by the Atlanta-based company SixthMan, would last from Thursday, January 19 to Monday, January 23. It would take place aboard the Carnival Destiny cruise ship, which is operated by the Carnival Cruise Line, and consist of a round trip from Miami in the United States to Cozumel in Mexico. For the cruise, four stages were prepared on the ship, including one that was erected on top of a swimming pool.

Per the initial announcement, the lineup for the concert, in addition to the headlining act of Weezer, would consist of supporting acts The Antlers, Boom Bip, Dinosaur Jr., Free Energy, Gene Ween and Dave Dreiwitz, Keepaway, The Knocks, The Nervous Wreckords, Ozma, Sebadoh, Sleeper Agent, Wavves, Yacht Rock Revue, and Yuck. Additionally, Lou Barlow of Sebadoh and J Mascis of Dinosaur Jr. were scheduled to have solo performances.

At the time that they announced the cruise, Weezer was working on new material and was planning a concert tour with The Flaming Lips. Both Billboard and NME, in their discussions of the cruise, noted that it was part of a trend for Weezer of performing in unconventional venues or touring styles. Discussing this, drummer Patrick Wilson said, "We don't tour the way we used to. We used to go out for months at a time in a bus and kind of lose your mind. Nowadays, we've all got kids, and we just pick our spots. We much prefer it, actually." A pre-sale event for the cruise tickets began on July 21, with regular sales beginning on August 3. Prices started at $799 (equivalent to $1,144 in 2025) per person for a double cabin, or $599 ($857 in 2025) per person for group bookings of four people.

The Weezer Cruise was one of a number of high-profile music cruises that took place in the early 2010s. In a 2012 article for The New York Times, Joe Levy, the editor for Billboard, called music cruises "a quietly thriving corner of the music and cruise industries", further saying, "While the music business has been in decline for over a decade and traditional cruise lines have never quite figured out how to attract the cool crowd, music cruises are both profitable and proliferating." Other musical acts that either had hosted or were planning to host music cruises at the time included Steve Earle, Knife Party, Kid Rock, John Mayer, Motörhead, Paramore, R Kelly, Skrillex, and Loudon Wainwright III, among others. In an interview with Tone Deaf, Weezer highlighted the first cruise as among their top 20 career highlights.

== 2012 cruise ==
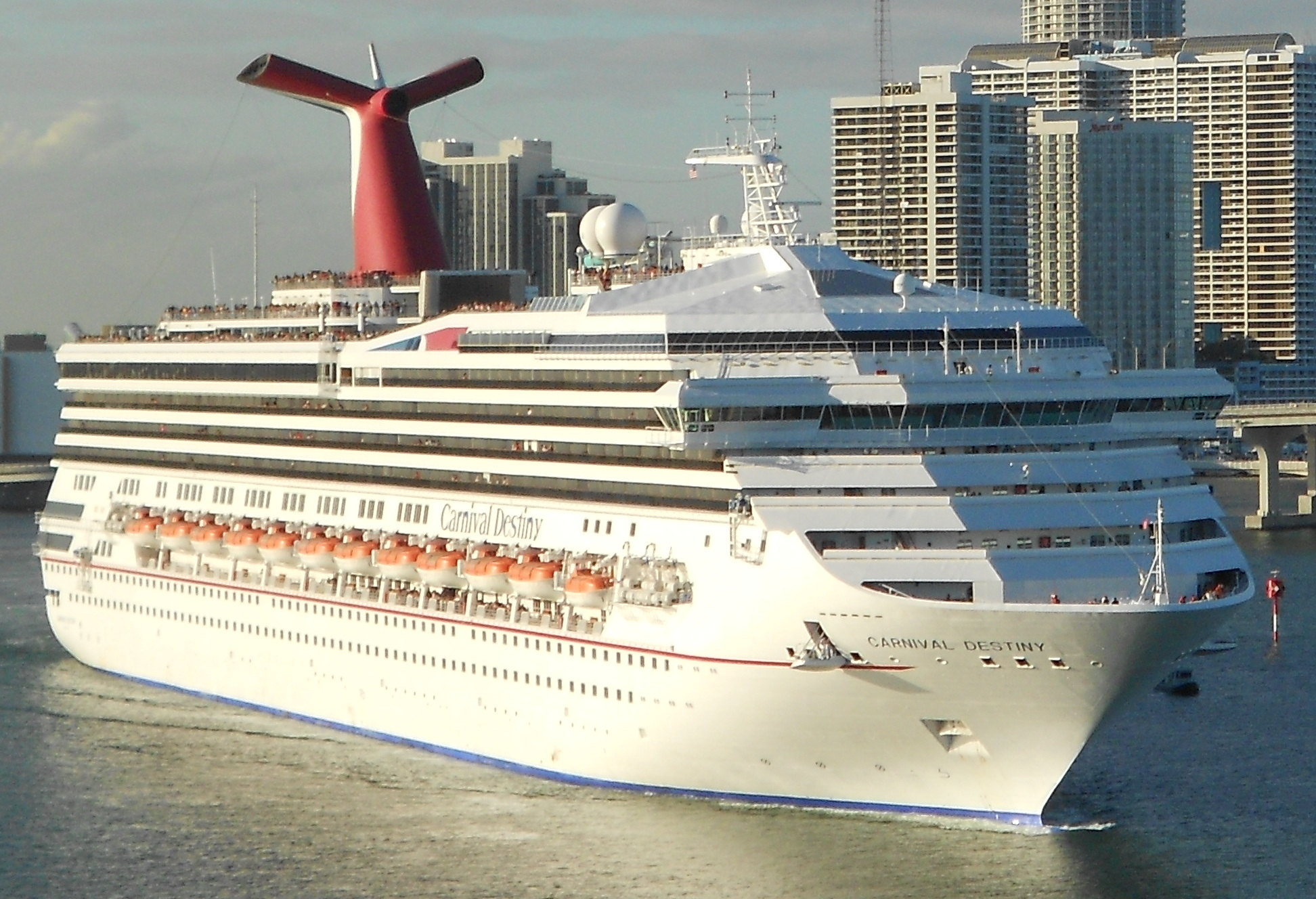
The Carnival Destiny in 2011

On January 19, the cruise departed from PortMiami with approximately 2,200 passengers. At departure, Weezer performed on the top deck of the ship, opening with "Hash Pipe" and continuing with some of their greatest hits, as well as covers "Karma Police" and "Paranoid Android". During this performance, Cuomo stepped down from the stage and interacted with fans. For their next performance, the band played the entirety of their 1994 album Weezer. On Friday, the band put on two performances that included their album Pinkerton and several B-side songs. Rivers Cuomo, the lead singer of Weezer, also read excerpts from The Pinkerton Diaries, which he recorded while making the album. Other events that occurred on Friday included a Weezer-themed party for single people, a Weezer-themed trivia contest with the bandmembers participating, and a cannonball contest with the members of Sebadoh serving as judges.

The ship docked at Cozumel on Saturday. That night, the cruise featured a 1980s-themed prom event. Other events that Weezer bandmembers participated in during the cruise included a midnight movie screening hosted by guitarist Brian Bell, a shuffleboard contest overseen by Wilson, and bassist Scott Shriner presiding over wedding vow renewals. In total, there were sixteen acts from all of the performers who were involved in the cruise. Over the span of four days, Barlow performed seven shows between his solo acts and ensemble performances with Dinosaur Jr. and Sebadoh. The ship returned to Miami on January 23.

== 2014 cruise ==
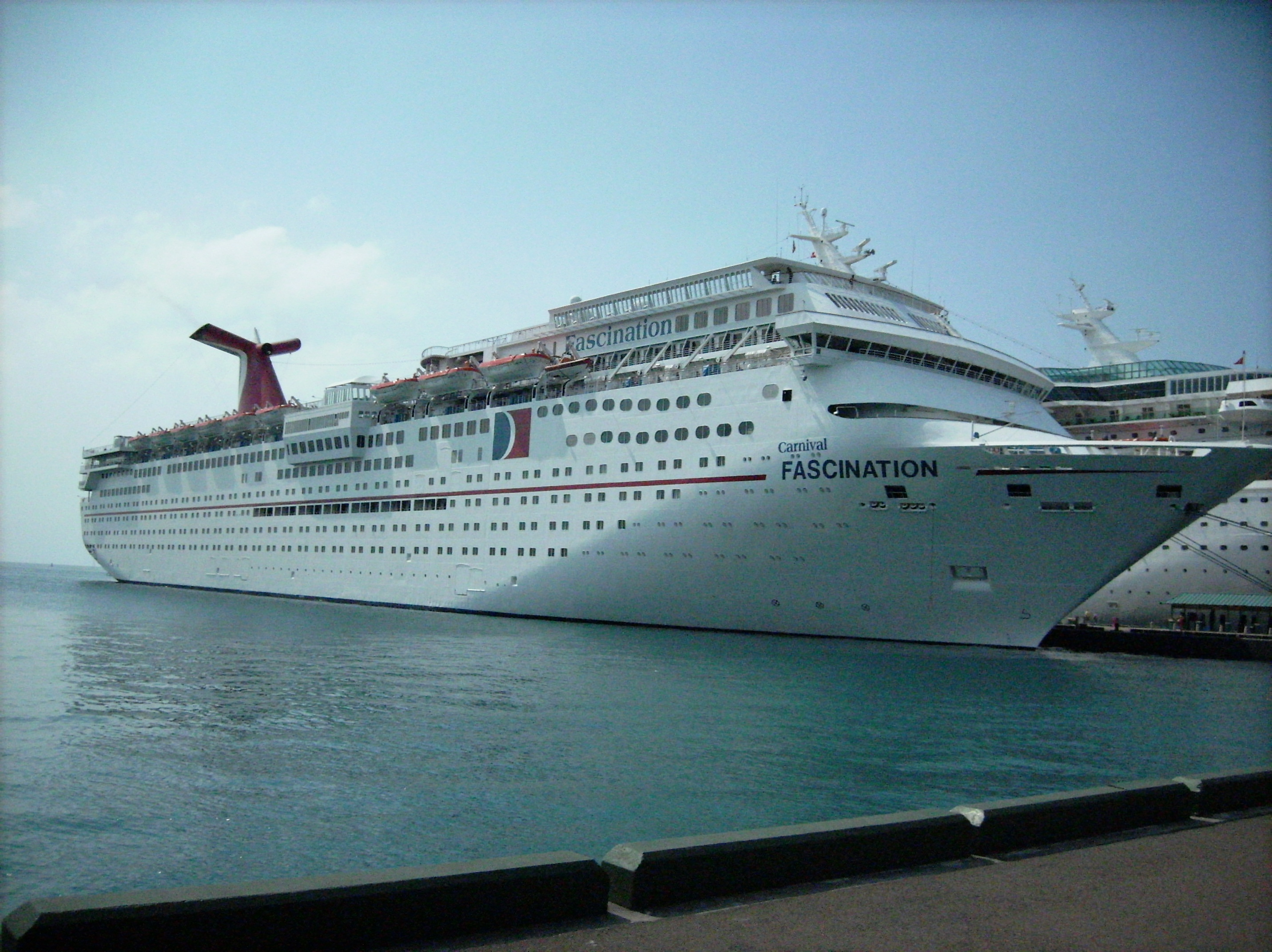
The Carnival Fascination in 2008

A follow-up event to the 2012 cruise was announced on March 11, 2013. The band stated that they would hold three performances of their own during the event, which was scheduled to last from February 13 through February 17, 2014, and consist of a round trip from Jacksonville, Florida, to the Bahamas. Specific stops in the Bahamas would include Freeport and Nassau, with Weezer performing an island beach party in the latter. Unlike the 2012 cruise, this one would take place aboard the Carnival Fascination. The lineup, which was announced later on May 28, included Ash, Bleached, Cat Power, Caveman, The Cribs, Adam DeVine, DIIV, Holy Fuck, The Orwells, Ozma, Palma Violets, The Relationship, and Toro y Moi. Individual tickets for the event had a starting price of $599 ($828 in 2025).

During the cruise, Weezer debuted the song "Back to the Shack", which would later be featured on their 2014 album Everything Will Be Alright in the End. According to Cuomo, the cruises were a major source of inspiration for the album, saying in an interview with the magazine Q, "One of the most inspiring moments for this record was when we did the Weezer Cruises and we were locked up with a bunch of our fans for five days. It was just such a feeling of love and support and passion for the most uniquely Weezer parts of what we do."

== Critical reception ==
In a 2012 article for The Guardian, Wendy Fonarow gave the cruise a positive review. Positive reviews were also given by Danny Cox of Billboard and by NME, with the latter calling it "one of the most surreal holidays in history". Julia Wallace, in a blog for Alan Cross's A Journal of Musical Things, said that the cruise resembled what she imagined "Spring Break at Daytona Beach" would be like.
