= The British Are Coming (song) =

Song by Weezer

from the album Everything Will Be Alright in the End
- Released: October 7, 2014
- Recorded: 2014
- Genre: Alternative rock, power pop
- Length: 4:08
- Label: Republic
- Songwriter: Rivers Cuomo
- Producer: Ric Ocasek

"The British Are Coming" is a song by the American rock band Weezer from their ninth studio album Everything Will Be Alright in the End (2014). While the song has not been released as a single, it was the third song from the album to be publicly available on stream prior to release, after "Back to the Shack" and "Cleopatra", and was made available to download with album pre-orders.

== Composition ==
Josh Terry from Consequence of Sound described "The British Are Coming" as "Rife with anthemic, first-raising choruses and fireworks-like guitar solos". Including acoustic guitars and references to the American Revolutionary War, Carolyn Menyes at Music Times described the guitar solos as "old school Weezer".

== Reception ==
Josh Terry at Consequence of Sound states ""The British Are Coming" highlights Weezer at their very best...the explosive song makes good on its Revolutionary War references." Terry also regards the song to be more promising than "Back to the Shack" and "Cleopatra". Carolyn Menyes of Music Times states "In the same vein as previously released Everything Will Be Alright In The End music, Weezer is all about pleasing the fans and returning to their 1990s glory days, and it's happened once again." Marc Hirsh from The Boston Globe noted that only Weezer can pull off a song like this "without smirking", and highlighted it as an essential track. Chris Schulz of The New Zealand Herald was more critical of the song, calling it "nothing more than mid-album filler."
