= Go Away (Weezer song) =

Promotional single by Weezer featuring Best Coast

from the album Everything Will Be Alright in the End
- Written: 2010
- Released: July 24, 2015
- Recorded: 2014
- Genre: Alternative rock; power pop; garage rock
- Length: 3:13
- Label: Republic
- Songwriters: Rivers Cuomo; Bethany Cosentino
- Producer: Ric Ocasek

Music video
- "Go Away" on YouTube
- "Go Away (Long Lost Edit)" on YouTube

"Go Away" is a song by the American rock band Weezer featuring the rock duo Best Coast. It was released as a single from the former's ninth studio album, Everything Will Be Alright in the End, on July 24, 2015, along with a music video. The song has mostly been positively received, being compared to Weezer's older work. In early 2026, the song experienced a resurgence in popularity on social media and became the band's top song on Spotify. By March 2026, it crossed over to the Billboard Hot 100 at No. 90, the band's first entry since their cover of "Africa" by Toto in 2018.

== Composition ==
"Go Away" features vocals from Bethany Cosentino of Best Coast. Cosentino and Weezer frontman Rivers Cuomo wrote the song in 2010. The song contains fuzzy chords, a 1960s-influenced pop melody, grunge-influenced guitars and a doo-wop chord progression. The song's genre has been described as alternative rock, garage rock, and power pop.

== Critical reception ==
Stephen Thomas Erlewine at AllMusic and Mische Pearlman from NME considers "Go Away" to be the highlight track from Everything Will Be Alright in the End. Similar to the album's fellow single Back to the Shack, Colin Stutz of Spin praised the song as being "catchy and familiar [to Weezer's older material]". Andrew Unterberger opined in Spin "Their voices sound spectacular together, and the two do a credible job of maintaining a 'Sometimes Always'-type push-pull dynamic over sunsoaked guitars and Patrick Wilson’s wave-crashing drums." At PopMatters, Evan Sawdy stated "it feels like [Rivers Cuomo] in his comfort zone: solid-but-not-extraordinary hooks, semi-predictable lyrics, but an overall sense of fun that doesn’t feel as forced as it did on Raditude or Hurley." in regards of the song. By contrast, Paste writer Tyler Kane compared it to Weezer's more recent material, describing it as having "over-glossy approach" and "over-thought" lyrics.

== Music video ==
Cuomo chasing after the "purse snatcher" in attempt to impress Cosentino.

A music video for "Go Away" was released on July 24, 2015. It was directed by Brendan Walter and Greg Yagolnitzer, and produced by Green Glow Films.

The video sees lead vocalist Cuomo as a man trying to win the love of a woman, played by Cosentino. Cuomo attempts posing as several different personas, using the dating app "Winder" (a parody of Tinder), in order to do so. While these attempts are not successful, Cuomo finally impresses Cosentino after saving her purse from a purse snatcher, played by drummer Patrick Wilson, who stole it solely to help Cuomo.

== Personnel ==
Personnel taken from Everything Will Be Alright in the End CD booklet.

Weezer

- Brian Bell
- Rivers Cuomo
- Scott Shriner
- Pat Wilson

Additional musicians

- Bethany Cosentino – guest vocals
- Bobb Bruno – additional guitar arrangements

== Charts ==
Chart performance for "Go Away"
Chart (2026)	Peak position
Canada Hot 100 (Billboard)	56
Canada Mainstream Rock (Billboard Canada)	27
Canada Modern Rock (Billboard Canada)	36
US Billboard Hot 100	63
US Alternative Airplay (Billboard)	3
US Hot Rock & Alternative Songs (Billboard)	13
