= Da Vinci (song) =

Single by Weezer

from the album Everything Will Be Alright in the End
- Released: November 18, 2014
- Recorded: 2014
- Genre: Alternative rock; power pop
- Length: 4:05
- Label: Republic
- Songwriters: Rivers Cuomo; Joshua Berman Alexander
- Producer: Ric Ocasek

Weezer singles chronology
"Cleopatra" (2014)	"Da Vinci" (2014)	"Thank God for Girls" (2015)

"Da Vinci" is a song by the American rock band Weezer. It was released as the third single from the band's ninth studio album, Everything Will Be Alright in the End on November 18, 2014.

== Critical reception ==
Scott Heisel of Alternative Press stated ""Da Vinci" is another example of Cuomo & Co. being absolute masters at their game." Lyrically, Heisel praises it as a love song, saying "The words are clear without being direct, making the lyrics potentially universal." By contrast, Michael Nelson of Stereogum considers the lyrics "cringe-worthy". Nelson, however, praises the chorus and bridge. Matthew McGuire at Crescent Vale considers it "one of the top tracks of the album with pop structured guitar riffs."

== Chart performance ==
Chart (2014)	Peak position
Canada Rock (Billboard)	42
US Alternative Airplay (Billboard)	32
