= Everything Will Be Alright in the End =

Studio album by Weezer
- Released: October 7, 2014
- Recorded: 2011–2014
- Studios: The Village, Los Angeles, California
- Genres: Alternative rock; power pop; pop-punk
- Length: 42:24
- Label: Republic
- Producer: Ric Ocasek

Weezer chronology
Death to False Metal (2010)	Everything Will Be Alright in the End (2014)	Weezer (2016)

Singles from Everything Will Be Alright in the End
- 1. "Back to the Shack" Released: July 22, 2014; 2. "Cleopatra" Released: September 8, 2014; 3. "Da Vinci" Released: November 18, 2014; 4. "Go Away" Released: July 24, 2015

Everything Will Be Alright in the End is the ninth studio album by American rock band Weezer, released on October 7, 2014. It is Weezer's only album released by Republic Records, and the third and final Weezer album produced by Ric Ocasek, who previously produced the Blue Album (1994) and Green Album (2001).

Everything Will Be Alright in the End departs from the electronic pop production of Weezer's previous two albums, Raditude (2009) and Hurley (2010), returning to a sound more reminiscent of the band's earlier albums. The lyrics deal with singer Rivers Cuomo's relationship with his father figures, fans, and women.

The album received positive reviews and became the most acclaimed Weezer album since Pinkerton (1996). It is the band's fifth album to peak in the Billboard 200 top five, reaching No. 5 and selling 34,000 copies its first week. The album was supported by three singles: "Back to the Shack", "Cleopatra", and "Da Vinci". As of early 2016, the album had sold 100,000 copies in the U.S.

== Background and recording ==
In 2010, Weezer released two albums: Hurley, and a collection of unreleased material, Death to False Metal. Shortly after their release, the band announced that work had begun on a ninth studio album, with the intent of a 2011 release. Set to be produced by Shawn Everett, who had worked on the band's previous two releases, the album was shelved. At this time, band frontman Rivers Cuomo stated: "We just started working on our tenth record. I was talking to the producer and he was saying, "These songs sound totally different from Hurley. Hurley was kind of dark, and the new songs sound like you're 16, riding your bicycle to get a Slurpee." The band abandoned work on the album, in order to give primary songwriter Cuomo more time to write more material.

Cuomo wanted to create a "complex, classic album", but hit a creative wall during the hiatus. In May 2013, following his yearly Vipassana meditation trip, Cuomo came up with "a strong vision of the album". He announced plans to begin recording a new album in January 2014, with work continuing through the summer. Ric Ocasek was announced as the album's producer; Ocasek produced the band's self-titled first and third albums, otherwise known as the Blue Album (1994) and the Green Album (2001). The band chose him as the producer based on the feeling that he would best be able to return to "the sound and the vibe and the energy of where [the band] came from", while also allowing them to "explore and try new things". Bassist Scott Shriner described Ocasek's production style as "very serious".

The band recorded the majority of the album in The Village, a recording studio located in Los Angeles, California. On March 19, 2014, Weezer released a clip of two new songs on the band's official YouTube account that ended with the words "in the studio now". On June 13, the album title was announced.

== Writing and composition ==
Over 200 songs were considered for the album, with 20 being tracked and "a dozen or so" being chosen for the album. According to the album's official press release, the album is organized thematically around three groups of songs: "Belladonna", "The Panopticon Artist" and "Patriarchia". Band leader Rivers Cuomo described the album's theme as "an increased awareness of the impermanence of everything we [take] for granted [and] "how to make peace with that." Drummer Patrick Wilson described the album's sound as "bombastic, loose, kind of booming. [The] record sounds like it's going to have the tight structure of the Blue Album with a little bit more abandon like Pinkerton". The band stated the album would feature less "modern pop production" than its previous two albums, Raditude and Hurley. The album as a whole has been described as alternative rock, power pop and pop punk.

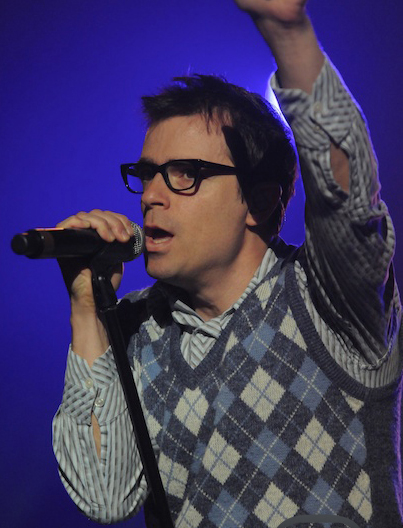
Rivers Cuomo (pictured in 2010) is credited with co-writing the entire album.

"Belladonna" includes the songs "Ain't Got Nobody", "Lonely Girl", "Da Vinci", "Go Away", "Cleopatra" and "Return to Ithaka", all of which deal with Cuomo's relationships with women. "Lonely Girl", written by Cuomo and Joshua Berman Alexander, features a power pop sound and "blend of heavy guitars mixed with a soft-singing Rivers Cuomo" and has been compared Weezer's earlier style on The Green Album. "Da Vinci", also co-written by Cuomo and Alexander, serves as the album's third single. Scott Heisel of Alternative Press compared the song, sonically, to "Pork and Beans", off The Red Album. He also described the song as "a love song of the purest order, directed toward a beautiful woman [...] or perhaps a soothing lullaby to a crying infant." The song also features a prominent whistling hook, which producer Ric Ocasek heavily criticized. The preceding single, "Cleopatra", was written solely by Cuomo. The song features the use of harmonica, acoustic guitar and a heavier sounding middle eight, which Chris Coplan at Consequence of Sound characterized as sounding like Weezer (1994). Cuomo took inspiration for the song from the Shakespeare tragedy, Antony and Cleopatra.

Tracks under "The Panopticon Artist" include "Back to the Shack", "I've Had It Up To Here" and "The Waste Land" all deal with Cuomo's relationships to others, particularly his fans. The album's first single, "Back to the Shack", lyrically deals with the wish to return "to [the band's] 1994 roots", with Rolling Stone describing it as a "nerdy, self-referential [...] guitar-heavy track". HitFix reviewer Dave Lewis found that the song serves as a thematic continuation of two previous Weezer songs: "In The Garage" from The Blue Album and "Memories" from Hurley. "I've Had It Up To Here" features Cuomo bringing "finest mock-operatic metal voice" and a "dexterous syncopation [...] providing a mid-point palate cleanser", and lyrically deals with his frustrations with "unappreciative masses". The bridge to the song was also noted for its "Queen-ly choral flourishes and skyscraping high notes."

The final group of songs are "Patriarchia", "Eulogy for a Rock Band", "The British Are Coming", "Foolish Father" and "Anonymous", which deal with relationships with father figures, "with a new spin". "Eulogy for a Rock Band", deals with the band's relation to "the great rock bands that came before [them] as they are retiring [...] We're kind of in that spot now." "The British Are Coming", written solely by Cuomo, features lyrical references to American Revolutionary War, acoustic guitars and an "old school Weezer" guitar solo.." The verses went through several lyrical changes, with Cuomo debating whether adding a personal angle to the song or purely writing from the point of view of the founding fathers. "Foolish Father" features "plea for paternal forgiveness that crests with a small choir singing" the album's title. The song was initially inspired by the Shakespeare tragedy, King Lear.

Entertainment Weekly reported that the album would feature an "ambitious three-part suite", which includes the song "My Mystery", which was later re-titled "Anonymous". The suite was later revealed to be titled "The Futurescope Trilogy", also featuring "The Waste Land" and "Return to Ithaka", which serves to "close out the album with a cacophony of guitars, percussion, and harmonies" that includes five concurrent guitar solos in "Return to Ithaka". Pitchfork writer Ian Cohen compared the ambitious trilogy to both the band's unfinished rock opera, Songs from the Black Hole and the band's 2008 single, "The Greatest Man That Ever Lived".

== Promotion ==
Starting on March 19, 2014, the band began releasing a weekly video series, with twenty-four installments. Several clips featured the band working in the studio and also revealed several song titles for the then-unnamed album, including "Ain't Got Nobody" and "The Waste Land". The ninth installment of the series eventually revealed the title to the album, while the eleventh revealed the album cover by visual artist Christopher McMahon. The original release date of September 30 was announced through both the web series and Entertainment Weekly, along with a behind-the-scenes look into the recording sessions.

In February 2014, the band performed the first single from the album, titled "Back to the Shack", on the 2014 Weezer Cruise. The studio version of the song premiered on July 21 on the band's YouTube channel, and was released as a single the following day. On July 23, the band performed the live TV debut of the song on The Tonight Show Starring Jimmy Fallon.

On July 21, the band announced the album would be available for pre-order on PledgeMusic. The band also announced plans to perform the entire album, "front to back", in certain small venues. On September 8, the band debuted a second single from the album, "Cleopatra", while also releasing upcoming album art, along with more pre-order information. The full album was made available on iTunes Radio on September 30, 2014, as part of the First Play series. On November 18, a third single from the album was released, "Da Vinci". "Go Away" was released as a promotional single on July 24, 2015, along with a music video. It experienced a resurgence in popularity on social media in early 2026 and became the band's top song on Spotify. By March 2026, it crossed over to the Billboard Hot 100 at No. 90, the band's first entry since their cover of "Africa" in 2018.

In late 2014, the band promoted the album by playing it live in its entirety, mainly in smaller venues that also included acoustic performances of songs from their back catalogue.

== Critical reception ==
Professional ratings
Aggregate scores
Source	Rating
AnyDecentMusic?	6.4/10
Metacritic	77/100
Review scores
Source	Rating
AllMusic	4/5 stars
Alternative Press	5/5 stars
The A.V. Club	B
Entertainment Weekly	B−
The Guardian	3/5 stars
Mojo	4/5 stars
NME	7/10
Pitchfork	6.5/10
Q	4/5 stars
Rolling Stone	4/5 stars

According to the review aggregator Metacritic, Everything Will Be Alright in the End received "generally favorable reviews" based on a weighted average score of 77 out of 100 from 33 critic scores. Stephen Thomas Erlewine at AllMusic states "there's a sense that Weezer made another record of massive, hooky rock not only because that's what the fans want but because they know it's what they do best", citing songs like "The British Are Coming", "Ain't Got Nobody", "Cleopatra" and "Go Away". Scott Heisel of Alternative Press comments that it "might not be the best Weezer album, but most definitely is the perfect Weezer album, at least right now." Heisel points out risks on the album, such as 5/4 to 4/4 time signature shifts heard on "Cleopatra" that eventually feels "right at home". At Billboard, Jillian Mapes declares it the best Weezer album since Maladroit, stating "A handful of tracks strewn with cheesy metaphors shows the impersonality that mars Cuomo's post-Pinkerton songwriting, despite some redeeming musical qualities that reaffirm Weezer as a purveyor of feedback and fuzz."

Consequence of Sound writer Dan Caffrey notes that "Everything Will Be Alright in the End doesn't just transport us to Weezer's younger days — it ushers us into their future. And for the first time in a while, it's looking pretty bright." Mischa Pearlman at NME declares "It's no Pinkerton, but Weezer, finally, are back on track." Pearlman considers "Foolish Father", "Lonely Girl", "Go Away" and "The Futurescope Trilogy" suite to be great tracks. Caryn Ganz of Rolling Stone comments that "the spirit of reconciliation is strong on Everything Will Be Alright in the End." Ganz also notes "The tracks devoted to Weezer's bond with their listeners are the most tormented and theatrical". Sputnikmusic reviewer Adam Thomas describes it as a "return to form", explaining that "a whimsical soundscape of 90's fuzz and the cheesy late 70's arena rock guitar harmonies that made Weezer both so cool and horribly uncool at the start of their career." Rock Sound's David McLaughlin rated the album a 7/10, declaring it to give the band's first two albums a "good go". McLaughlin concluded with that the album "feels like a cohesive, artfully crafted whole."

The album appeared on several annual "best-of" lists in 2014. Rolling Stone named the album the fourteenth best of the year, praising the band for "rediscovering the art of the three-minute girl jam", while also expanding the group's sound. Robin Hilton called it "the record of the year", while Alternative Press labeled it the seventh essential album of the year. The album was included at number 41 on Rock Sound's "Top 50 Albums of the Year" list. The album was included at number 9 on Kerrang!'s "The Top 50 Rock Albums Of 2014" list.

== Commercial performance ==
Everything Will Be Alright in the End debuted at number five on the Billboard 200 with 34,000 units sold, making it Weezer's fifth top five album, as well as the band's seventh top 10 album in a row. The album debuted at number 10 on the Canadian Albums Chart, selling 3,500 copies. The album has sold 100,000 copies in the US as of March 2016. As of September 2016, the album has sold over 225,000 copies worldwide.

== Track listing ==
All tracks are written by Rivers Cuomo, except where noted.

Everything Will Be Alright in the End
No.	Title	Writer(s)	Length
1.	"Ain't Got Nobody"		3:21
2.	"Back to the Shack"	Cuomo; Jacob Kasher	3:05
3.	"Eulogy for a Rock Band"	Cuomo; Daniel Brummel; Ryen Slegr	3:25
4.	"Lonely Girl"	Cuomo; Josh Alexander	2:49
5.	"I've Had It Up to Here"	Cuomo; Justin Hawkins	2:49
6.	"The British Are Coming"		4:08
7.	"Da Vinci"	Cuomo; Alexander	4:05
8.	"Go Away" (featuring Best Coast)	Cuomo; Bethany Cosentino	3:13
9.	"Cleopatra"		3:11
10.	"Foolish Father"	Cuomo; Patrick Stickles	4:31
11.	"The Futurescope Trilogy": I. "The Wasteland"; II. "Anonymous"; III. "Return to Ithaka"		7:32: 1:56; 3:19; 2:17
Total length:			42:24

Note

- Streaming services list "The Wasteland", "Anonymous" and "Return to Ithaka" as individual tracks.

== Personnel ==
Personnel taken from Everything Will Be Alright in the End CD booklet.

Weezer

- Brian Bell
- Rivers Cuomo
- Scott Shriner
- Pat Wilson

Additional musicians

- Daniel Brummel – Prophet keyboard & piano on "Eulogy For a Rock Band"
- Bethany Cosentino – guest vocals on "Go Away"
- Bobb Bruno – additional guitar arrangements on "Go Away"
- Patrick Stickles – guitar on "Foolish Father"
- Weezer Choir on "Foolish Father"
  - Ariel Barber, Kyoko Cuomo, Zach Kanner, W.A.W Parker, Zach Puchtel, Kelsey Worley

Production

- Ric Ocasek – production
- Samuel Bell – recording
- Shawn Everett – additional production and engineering
- Chris Owens – assistant engineer
- Vanessa Wormer – assistant engineer
- Alex Williams – assistant engineer
- Tom Lord-Alge – mixing
- Eddie Rendini – assistant mixing engineer
- Ted Jensen – mastering

Design

- Scott Kinsey – art director
- Chris McMahon – cover painting
- Johannes Gamble – booklet painting
- Richard Downie – booklet photography
- Brian Gallino – booklet photography

== Charts ==
Chart (2014)	Peak position
Australian Albums (ARIA)	45
Belgian Albums (Ultratop Flanders)	166
Belgian Albums (Ultratop Wallonia)	107
Canadian Albums (Billboard)	10
French Albums (SNEP)	138
German Albums (Offizielle Top 100)	95
New Zealand Albums (RMNZ)	33
Swiss Albums (Schweizer Hitparade)	57
UK Albums (Official Charts)	37
US Billboard 200	5
US Top Alternative Albums (Billboard)	2
US Top Rock Albums (Billboard)	2

=== Year-end charts ===
Chart (2014)	Position
US Top Rock Albums	72
US Alternative Albums (Billboard)	44
