= Weezer =

American rock band

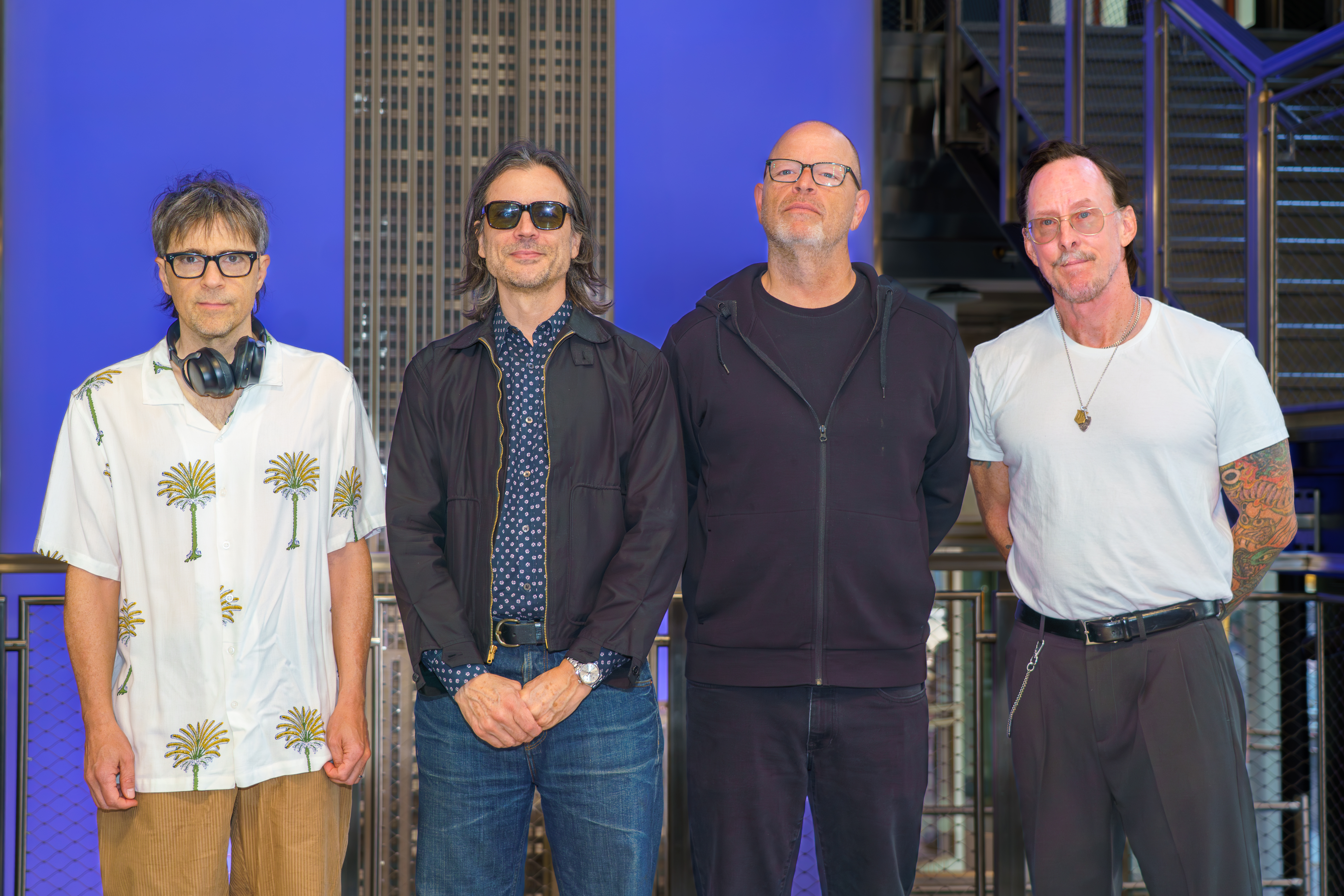
- From left to right: Rivers Cuomo, Brian Bell, Patrick Wilson, and Scott Shriner in 2026

Background information
- Origin: Los Angeles, California, U.S.
- Genres: Alternative rock; power pop; pop rock; pop-punk
- Works: Discography; songs
- Years active: 1992–present (hiatus: 1997–2000, 2006)
- Labels: DGC; Geffen; Interscope; Epitaph; Republic; Crush; Atlantic; Reprise; Warner
- Spinoffs: The Rentals; Homie; Scott & Rivers; The Special Goodness; The Relationship
- Members: Rivers Cuomo; Patrick Wilson; Brian Bell; Scott Shriner
- Past members: Matt Sharp; Jason Cropper; Mikey Welsh
- Website: weezer.com
- Logo

Weezer is an American rock band formed in Los Angeles, California, in 1992. Since 2001, the band has consisted of Rivers Cuomo (lead vocals, guitar, keyboards), Patrick Wilson (drums), Brian Bell (guitar, keyboards, backing vocals), and Scott Shriner (bass, keyboards, backing vocals). They have sold 10 million albums in the United States and over 35 million worldwide.

After signing with Geffen Records in 1993, Weezer released its acclaimed self-titled debut album, also known as the Blue Album, on May 10th 1994. Backed by music videos for the hit singles "Undone – The Sweater Song", "Buddy Holly", and "Say It Ain't So", the Blue Album became a multi-platinum success. Weezer's second album, Pinkerton (1996), featuring a darker, more abrasive sound, was a commercial failure and initially received mixed reviews, but achieved cult status and acclaim later sometime around 2000 before the Green Album. Both the Blue Album and Pinkerton have been cited among the best albums of the 1990s. After the tour for Pinkerton, the founding bassist, Matt Sharp, left the band to pursue his other band, The Rentals, and Weezer went on hiatus.

In 2001, Weezer returned with the Green Album and a new bassist, Mikey Welsh. With a more pop-oriented sound, and promoted by singles "Hash Pipe", "Photograph" and "Island in the Sun", it was a commercial success and received mostly good reviews. After the American leg of the Green Album tour, Welsh left after a nervous breakdown and was replaced by Scott Shriner for the remaining touring. Weezer's fourth album, Maladroit (2002), incorporated a hard rock sound and received mostly good reviews, but weaker sales. Make Believe (2005) received mixed reviews but its single "Beverly Hills" became Weezer's first single to top the US Modern Rock Tracks chart and their first to reach the top ten on the Billboard Hot 100.

In 2008, Weezer released the Red Album. Its lead single, "Pork and Beans", became the third Weezer song to top the Modern Rock Tracks chart, backed by a Grammy-winning music video. Raditude (2009) and Hurley (2010) both featured more modern pop production, along with songs written with other artists, receiving further mixed reviews and moderate sales. Everything Will Be Alright in the End (2014) and the White Album (2016) returned to a rock style reminiscent of the band's 1990s sound, mixed with modern alternative production, and received better reviews, while Pacific Daydream (2017) returned to a more mainstream pop sound. In 2019, Weezer surprise-released an album of covers, the Teal Album, followed by the Black Album. In 2021, it released OK Human, which featured an orchestral pop sound and received acclaim, followed by the hard rock-inspired Van Weezer. In 2022, Weezer released SZNZ, a series of four mini-albums based on the four seasons. Weezer's 20th album, the Gold Album, was released in 2026.

== History ==
=== Formation and first years (1989–1994) ===
Lead vocalist and guitarist Rivers Cuomo moved to Los Angeles from Connecticut, in 1989 with his high school metal band, Avant Garde, which was later renamed Zoom. After the group disbanded, Cuomo met drummer Patrick Wilson and moved in with him and Wilson's friend Matt Sharp. Cuomo moved away from metal and explored alternative rock influences such as Nirvana, the Pixies and Sonic Youth. He and Wilson formed a band, Fuzz, and enlisted Scottie Chapman on bass. Chapman quit after a few early shows; the band reformed as Sixty Wrong Sausages, with Cuomo's friend Pat Finn on bass and Jason Cropper on guitar, but soon disbanded. Cuomo moved to Santa Monica, California, and recorded dozens of demos, including the future Weezer songs "The World Has Turned and Left Me Here" and "Undone – The Sweater Song". Sharp was enthusiastic about the demos, and became the group's bassist and de facto manager.

Cuomo, Wilson, Sharp, and Cropper formed Weezer on February 15, 1992. Their first show was on March 19, 1992, closing for Keanu Reeves' band Dogstar. They took their name from a nickname Cuomo's father gave him, which was based on a character called "Wheezer" from the Our Gang short films. Cuomo gave Sharp one year to get the band a record deal before Cuomo accepted a scholarship at the University of California, Berkeley. In 1992, Weezer recorded a demo, The Kitchen Tape, including a version of the future Weezer single "Say It Ain't So". The demo was heard by Todd Sullivan, an A&R man at Geffen Records, who signed Weezer in June 1993.

=== The "Blue Album" (1994) ===
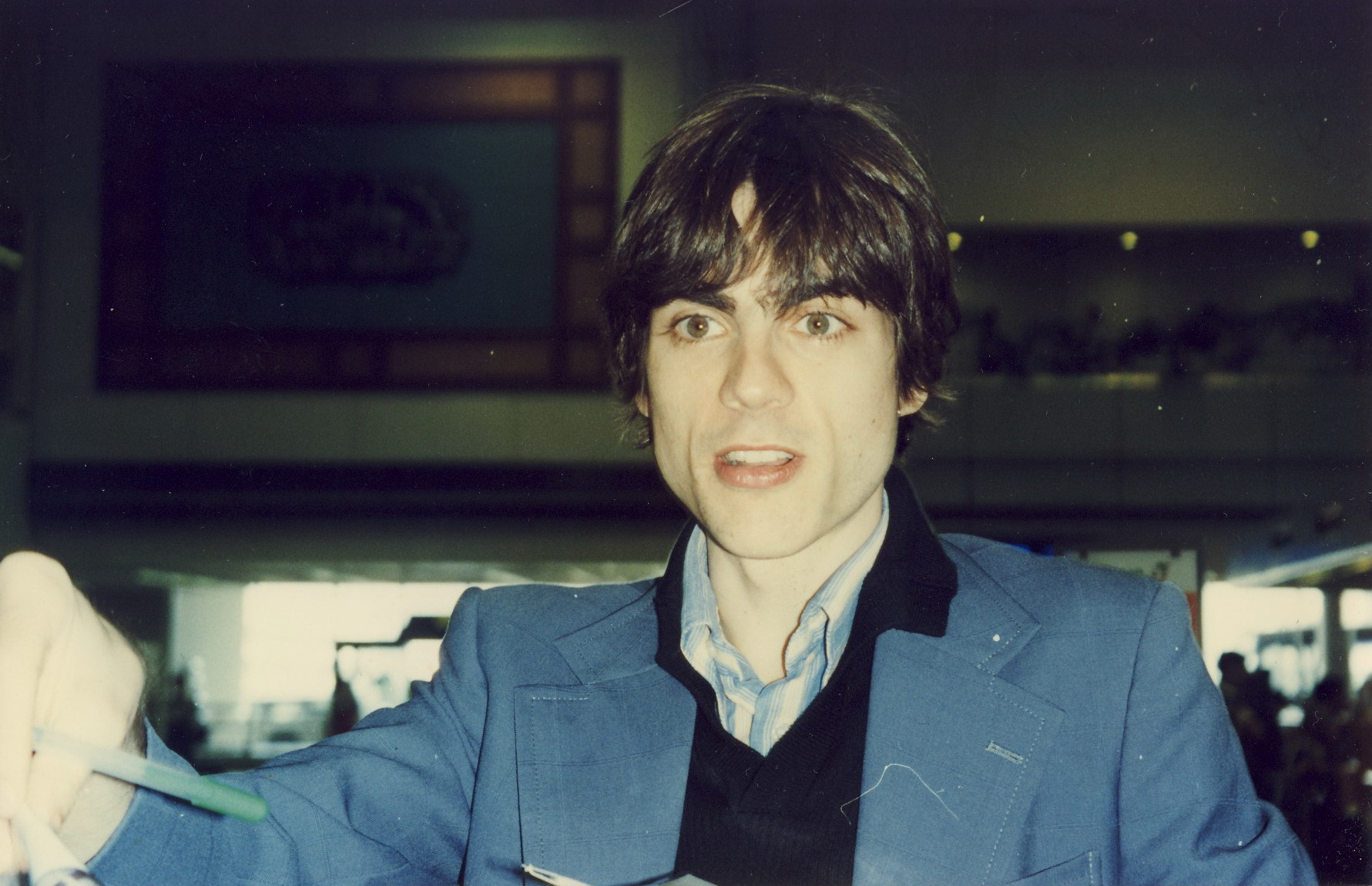
Weezer guitarist Brian Bell (pictured here in 1997) replaced Jason Cropper while recording the Blue Album.

Weezer recorded their debut album with the producer Ric Ocasek at Electric Lady Studios in New York City. Cropper was fired during recording, as Cuomo and Sharp felt he was threatening the band chemistry. He was replaced by Brian Bell. Weezer's self-titled debut album, also known as the "Blue Album", was released in May 1994. Described by Pitchfork as integrating "geeky humor, dense cultural references, and positively gargantuan hooks", it combined alternative rock, power pop, polished production and what AllMusic critic Stephen Thomas Erlewine called an "'70s trash-rock predilection ... resulting in something quite distinctive".

Weezer's first single, "Undone – The Sweater Song", was backed by a music video directed by Spike Jonze; filmed in an unbroken take, it featured Weezer performing on a sound stage with little action, barring a pack of dogs swarming the set. The video became an instant hit on MTV. The song reached No. 57 on the Billboard Hot 100. Jonze also directed Weezer's second video, "Buddy Holly", splicing the band into footage from the 1970s television sitcom Happy Days. The video achieved heavy rotation on MTV and won four MTV Video Music Awards, including Breakthrough Video and Best Alternative Music Video. "Buddy Holly" peaked at No. 18 on the Hot 100 Airplay and No. 2 on the Billboard Modern Rock chart. The song is included on Rolling Stone's 500 Best Songs Of All Time. The single, "Say It Ain't So", reached No. 51 on the Hot 100 Airplay chart and No. 7 on the Billboard Modern Rock chart. Pitchfork later ranked it the tenth-best song of the 1990s and Rolling Stone named it one of the 100 greatest guitar songs. In 2020, Rolling Stone ranked the Blue album number 294 on its list of the 500 Greatest Albums Of All Time. Weezer is certified five-times platinum in the US and quadruple-platinum in Canada, making it Weezer's best-selling album.

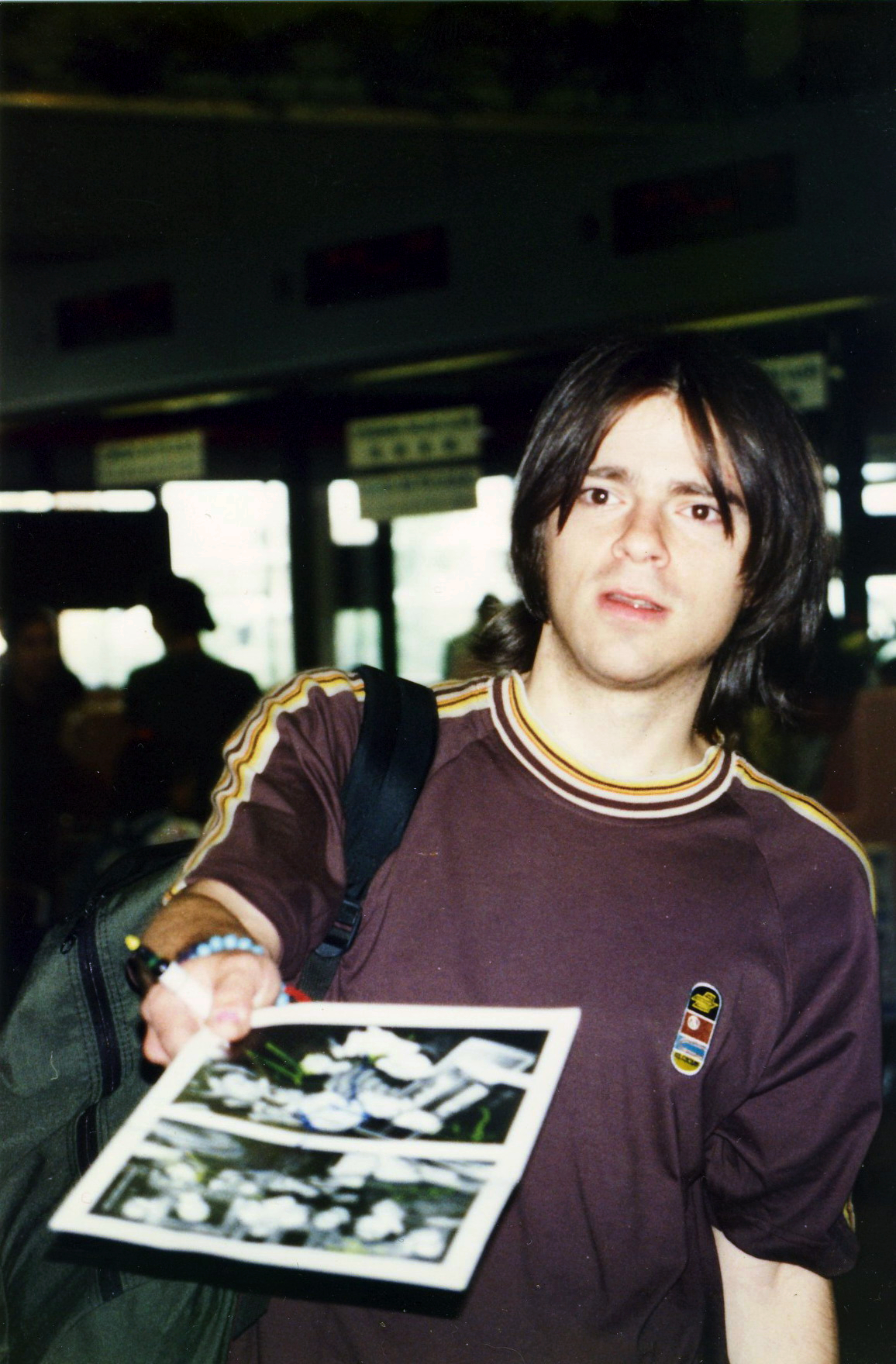
Rivers Cuomo in Thailand in 1997

=== Pinkerton (1994–1997) ===
In 1994, Weezer took a break from touring for the Christmas holidays. Cuomo traveled to his home state of Connecticut and began recording demos for Weezer's next album. His original concept was a space-themed rock opera, Songs from the Black Hole, that would express his mixed feelings about success. Cuomo conceived the story as a metaphor for his conflicted feelings about touring in a successful rock band. Weezer developed the concept through intermittent recording sessions through 1995. At the end of the year, Cuomo enrolled at Harvard University, where his songwriting became "darker, more visceral and exposed, less playful", and he abandoned Songs from the Black Hole. While attending Harvard, Cuomo experienced loneliness and frustration while also undergoing an extensive surgery for his left leg. These experiences influenced his songwriting for the next record. The other members of Weezer decided to embark on their own side projects during this time. Sharp started the Rentals, who released their debut album, Return of the Rentals, in October 1995, also featuring Wilson on drums.

Weezer's second album, Pinkerton, was released on September 24, 1996. Pinkerton is named after the character BF Pinkerton from Madama Butterfly, who marries and abandons a Japanese woman named Butterfly. Calling him an "asshole American sailor similar to a touring rock star", Cuomo felt the character was "the perfect symbol for the part of myself that I am trying to come to terms with on this album". Three singles were released: "El Scorcho", "The Good Life", and "Pink Triangle".

With a darker, more abrasive sound, Pinkerton sold poorly compared to the Blue Album and received mixed reviews; it was voted one of the worst albums of 1996 in a Rolling Stone reader poll. it eventually gained a cult following and came to be considered among Weezer's best work; in 2002, Rolling Stone readers voted Pinkerton the 16th-greatest album of all time. In 2004, Rolling Stone gave the album a new review, awarding it five out of five and adding it to the "Rolling Stone Hall of Fame". Pinkerton was certified platinum in 2016. It is credited for influencing a number of emo bands in the 2000s.

In July 1997, the sisters Mykel, Carli, and Trysta Allan died in a car accident while driving home from a Weezer show in Denver, Colorado. Mykel and Carli ran Weezer's fan club and helped manage publicity for several other Los Angeles bands, and had inspired the "Sweater Song" B-side "Mykel and Carli". Weezer canceled a show to attend their funeral. In August, Weezer and other bands held a benefit concert for the family in Los Angeles. A compilation album, Hear You Me! A Tribute to Mykel and Carli, was dedicated to their memory. The album included "Mykel and Carli", as well as songs by Ozma, That Dog, and Kara's Flowers. In 2001, Jimmy Eat World released "Hear You Me", dedicated to Mykel and Carli.

=== Hiatus (1997–2000) ===
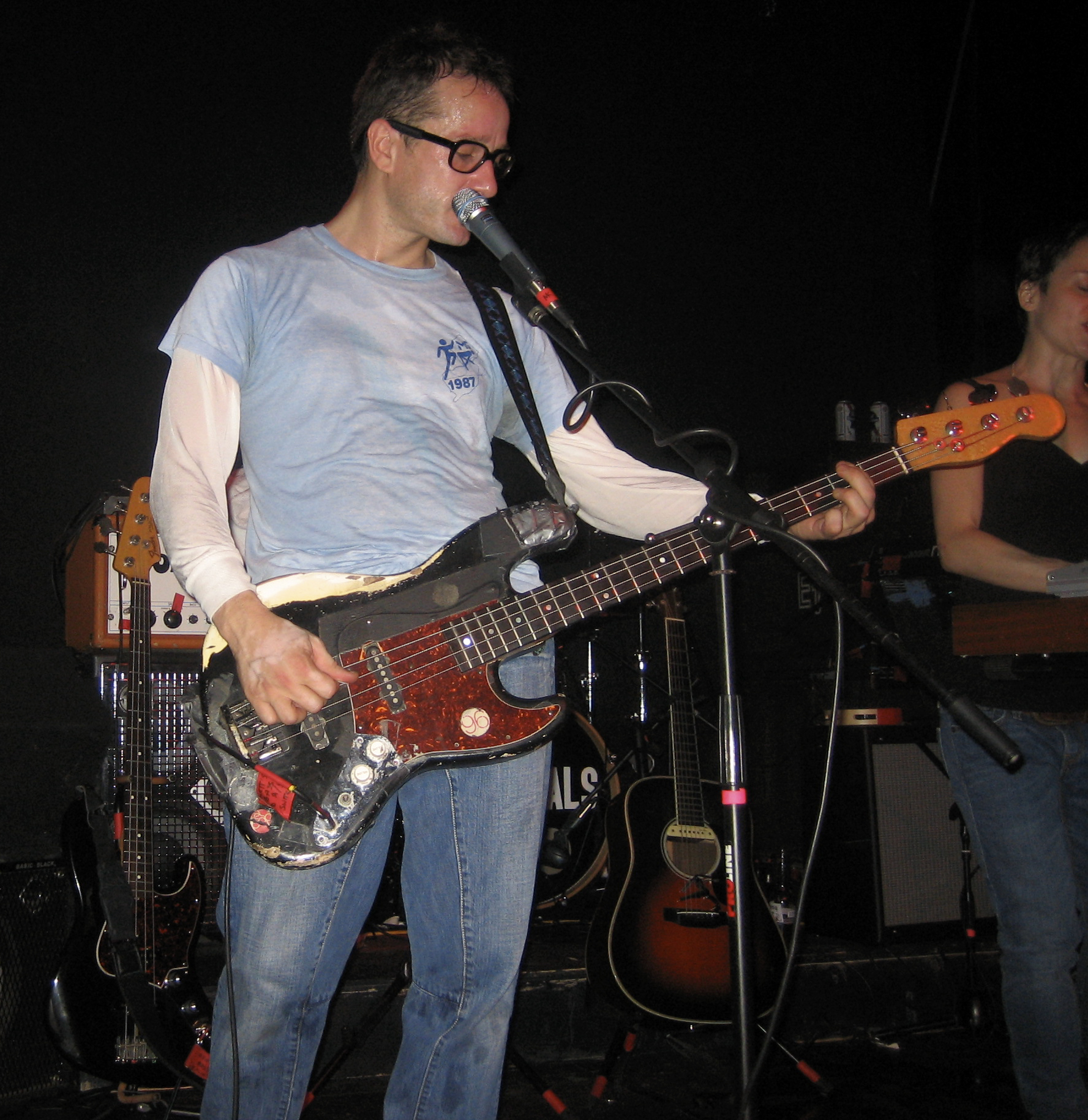
Former bassist Matt Sharp (pictured here with the Rentals in 2007) co-founder of Weezer, left the band after the Pinkerton tour.

Weezer completed the Pinkerton tour in mid-1997 and went on hiatus. Wilson returned to his home in Portland, Oregon to work on his side project, the Special Goodness, and Bell worked on his band Space Twins. In 1998, Sharp left Weezer due to differences with the band members. He said of his departure: "I certainly have my view of it, as I'm sure everybody else has their sort of foggy things. When you have a group that doesn't communicate, you're going to have a whole lot of different stories."

Cuomo returned to Harvard but took a break to focus on songwriting. He formed a new band composed of a changing lineup of Boston musicians, and performed new material. The songs were abandoned, but bootlegs of the Boston shows are traded on the internet. Cuomo formed the side project, Homie. The members were Greg Brown (Cake and Deathray), Matt Sharp, Yuval Gabay (Soul Coughing and Sulfur), Adam Orth (Shufflepuck), and future Weezer bassist Mikey Welsh. Although a Homie album was being recorded, only one song was released, "American Girls", for the 1998 film Meet the Deedles.

In February 1998, Cuomo, Bell and Wilson reunited in Los Angeles to start work on the next Weezer album. Welsh joined as their new bassist. Weezer continued rehearsing and recording demos until late 1998. Frustration and creative disagreements led to a decline in rehearsals, and in late 1998, Wilson left for his home in Portland pending renewed productivity from Cuomo. In November 1998, the band played two club shows with a substitute drummer in California under the name Goat Punishment, consisting entirely of covers of Nirvana and Oasis songs. In the months following, Cuomo entered a period of depression, unplugging his phone, painting the walls of his home black, and putting fiberglass insulation over his windows to prevent light from entering. During this time, Cuomo started experimenting with his music and wrote 121 songs by 1999. In the meantime, Wilson continued to work with the Special Goodness while Bell worked with Space Twins. Welsh resumed touring with Juliana Hatfield.

=== Comeback, the "Green Album" and Maladroit (2000–2002) ===
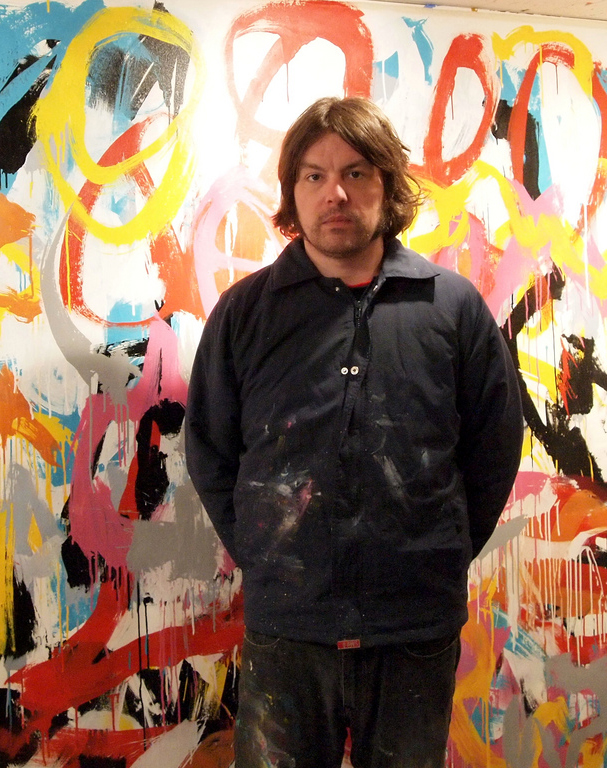
Mikey Welsh (1971–2011; pictured here in 2010) played bass for Weezer from 1998 to 2001.

Weezer reunited in April 2000, when they accepted a lucrative offer to perform at the Fuji Rock Festival. The festival served as a catalyst for Weezer's productivity, and from April to May 2000, they rehearsed and demoed new songs in Los Angeles. They returned to live shows in June 2000, playing small unpromoted concerts once again under the name Goat Punishment. In June 2000, the band joined the American Warped Tour for nine dates.

Eventually, the band returned to the studio to produce a third album, the "Green Album". Due to the mixed reception of Pinkerton, Cuomo wrote less personal lyrics for the Green Album. The band hired Ric Ocasek, who had also produced the band's debut album. Shortly after the release, Weezer went on another American tour. The album was supported by the singles "Hash Pipe", "Island in the Sun", and "Photograph". Executives suggested that "Don't Let Go" should be chosen as the first single. However, Cuomo continued to fight and "Hash Pipe" eventually became the album's first single. "Hash Pipe" peaked at No. 2 on the Billboard Modern Rock chart. "Island In the Sun" was released as the second single and became a radio hit as well as one of their biggest overseas hits. The song has gained increasing popularity over the years as it later joined the digital song sales in 2008, only to peak at No. 18 in 2022. The label tried to postpone the release date of Weezer further until June, but they ended up sticking to the album's original release date of May 15 release date. The album debuted at number 4 on the Billboard 200 and has since been certified platinum.

After suffering a breakdown from the stress of touring, undiagnosed bipolar disorder, and drug abuse, Welsh attempted suicide and left Weezer in 2001. He was replaced by Scott Shriner, who had also played with Vanilla Ice. Jonze returned to film a music video for "Island In the Sun".

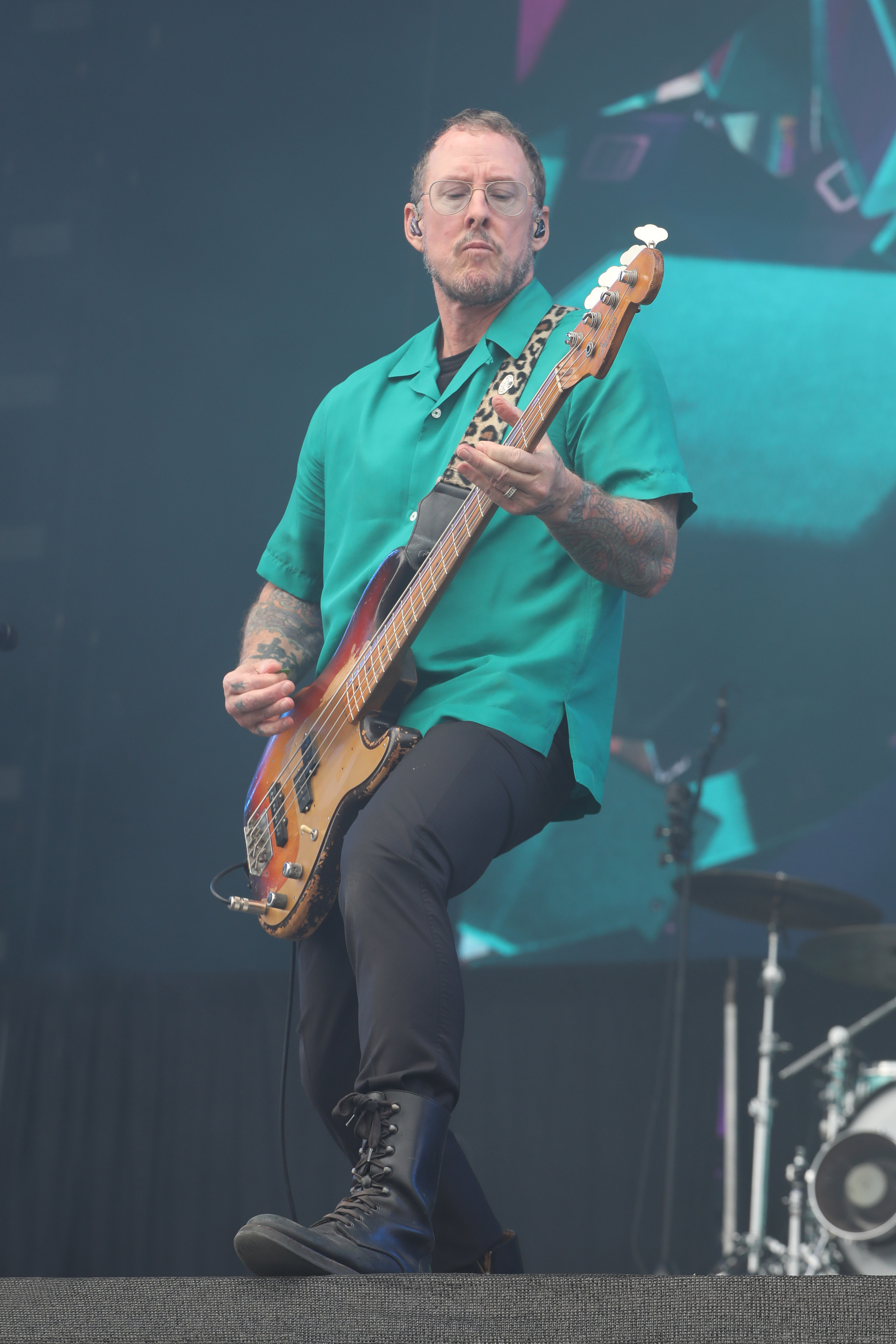
Scott Shriner, pictured in 2022, has been Weezer's bassist since 2001

Weezer took an experimental approach to the recording process of its fourth album by allowing fans to download in-progress mixes of new songs from its official website in return for feedback. After the release of the album, the band said that this process was something of a failure, as the fans did not supply the group with coherent, constructive advice. Cuomo eventually delegated song selection for the album to the band's original A&R rep, Todd Sullivan, saying that Weezer fans chose the "wackiest songs". Only the song "Slob" was included on the album due to general fan advice.

The band's fourth album, Maladroit, was released on May 14, 2002, only one year after its predecessor. Due to issues Cuomo had with record label Geffen/Interscope, Weezer self-funded the recordings for Maladroit. The label wasn't made aware of the recordings until they made it to radio. Cuomo was so excited for people to hear the music that he sent 8 out of the 13 songs on Maladroit to radio stations and various outlets. This situation resulted in a gag order being issued by Geffen Records. They requested Weezer to return the tapes from the Maladroit sessions and apologize to every radio station that played the song. The band members refused since they had funded all the sessions themselves.

The album served as a harder-edged version of the band's music. Rob Mitchum of Pitchfork wrote, "things are harder-edged musically than the sunny Green Album tunes, with guitarists Rivers Cuomo and Brian Bell laying on as much distortion as possible over the crunchy riffs that hold up...pretty much the entire affair. Although met with generally positive critical reviews, its sales were not as strong as those for the Green Album. Two singles were released from the album, "Dope Nose" "Keep Fishin'". "Dope Nose" reached No. 8 on the Billboard Modern Rock chart. The music video for "Keep Fishin'" combined Weezer with the Muppets, and had heavy rotation on MTV. The music videos for both songs were directed by Marcos Siega.

Spin reviewed it as the 6th best album of 2002. A Rolling Stone reader's poll also from that year voted it the 90th greatest album of all time. Weezer released its first DVD on March 23, 2004. The Video Capture Device DVD chronicles the band from its beginnings through Maladroit's Enlightenment Tour. Compiled by the band's assistant Karl Koch, the DVD features home video footage, music videos, commercials, rehearsals, concert performances, television performances, and band commentary. The DVD was certified gold on December 15, 2004.

=== Make Believe (2003–2006) ===
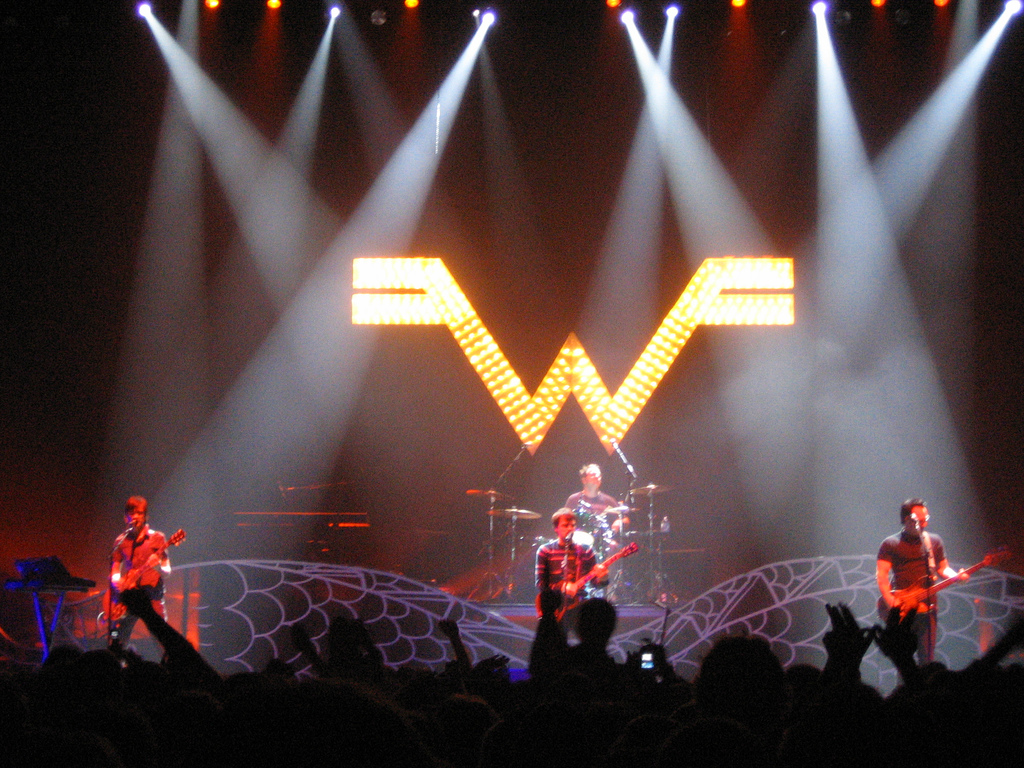
Weezer performing in October 2005

Before working on new material, Cuomo discovered vipassana meditation which became a large influence to his songwriting. He decided to take a more personal approach to his writing once again. One song during this process, "The Other Way", was written for Cuomo's ex-girlfriend Jennifer Chiba after her then-boyfriend, singer-songwriter Elliott Smith, presumably died by suicide. Cuomo said, "I wanted to console her, but I was confused and skeptical about my own motives for wanting to do so, so I wrote that song about that". Before recording material for their fourth album, Bell and Wilson worked on their own projects. Bell's Space Twins released The End of Imagining which Rolling Stone critic, John D. Lueressen named the 7th best album of 2003. Meanwhile, Wilson's the Special Goodness released Land Air Sea.

From December 2003 to the fall of 2004, Weezer recorded a large amount of material intended for a new album to be released in the spring of 2005 with producer Rick Rubin. The band's fifth studio album, titled Make Believe, was released on May 10, 2005. The album debuted at No. 2 on the Billboard 200. Despite commercial success, Make Believe got a mixed reception from critics, receiving an average score of 52 on the review collator Metacritic. Although some reviews, such as AMG's, compared it favorably to Pinkerton, others, among them Pitchfork, panned the album as predictable and lyrically poor.

The album's first single, "Beverly Hills", became a hit in the U.S. and worldwide, staying on the charts for several months after its release. It became the first Weezer song to hit No. 1 on the Billboard Modern Rock chart and No. 10 on the Billboard Hot 100. "Beverly Hills" was nominated for Best Rock Song at the 48th Annual Grammy Awards, the first ever Grammy nomination for the band. The video was also nominated for Best Rock Video at the 2005 MTV Video Music Awards. The second single released from Make Believe was "We Are All on Drugs" which peaked at No. 10 on the Alternative Airplay chart. MTV refused to play the song, so Weezer re-recorded the lyrics by replacing "on drugs" with "in love" and renaming the song "We Are All in Love". In early 2006, it was announced that Make Believe was certified platinum, and "Beverly Hills" was the second most popular song download on iTunes for 2005, finishing just behind "Hollaback Girl" by Gwen Stefani. Make Believe's third single, "Perfect Situation", reached No. 1 U.S. Billboard Modern Rock chart and No. 51 on the Billboard Hot 100. "This Is Such a Pity" was the band's fourth single from the album, but no music video was made for its release.

=== The "Red Album" (2006–2008) ===
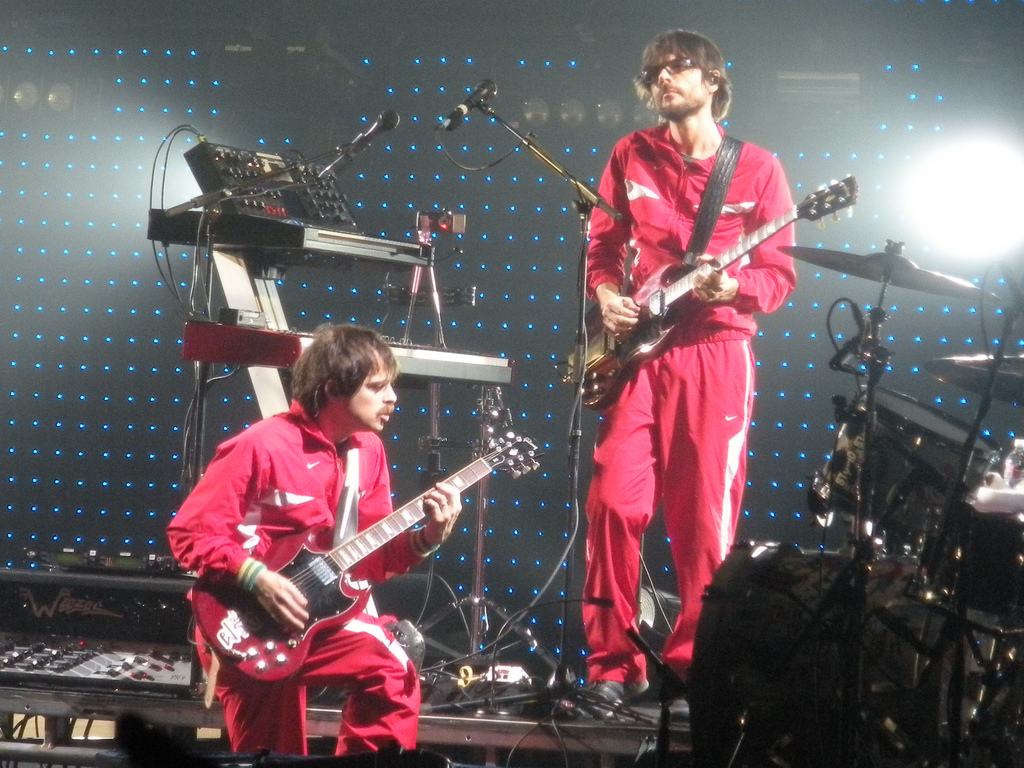
Weezer performing in Arizona in October 2008

After the success of Make Believe, the band decided to take a break. Cuomo returned to Harvard, where he graduated and earned a bachelor’s degree in English. He also earned a spot in the academic honor society Phi Beta Kappa in 2006. Cuomo also married Kyoko Ito on June 18, 2006, a woman he had met at a solo gig in Massachusetts in 1997. The wedding was attended by the current members of the band as well as Matt Sharp and Jason Cropper. During this break, Wilson and Bell appeared in the 2006 film Factory Girl playing John Cale and Lou Reed respectively, as well as contributing a cover of the Velvet Underground song "Heroin" for the film. Also during this time, Bell started a new project, the Relationship.

Weezer (also known as the Red Album) was released in June 2008. The album was produced by Rick Rubin and Jacknife Lee, with Rich Costey mixing it. The record was described as "experimental", and according to Cuomo, who claimed it at the time to be Weezer's "boldest and bravest and showiest album", included longer and non-traditional songs, TR-808 drum machines, synthesizers, Southern rap, baroque counterpoint, and band members other than Cuomo writing, singing, and switching instruments. Wilson said the album cost about a million dollars to make, contrasting it with the $150,000 budget of the Blue Album. The album debuted at No. 4 on the Billboard 200 while receiving generally positive reviews.

Its lead single, "Pork and Beans", topped the Billboard Modern Rock Tracks charts for 11 weeks while also peaking at No. 64 on the Billboard Hot 100. Its music video won a Grammy for Best Short Form Music Video. The second single, "Troublemaker", peaked at No. 2. The music video for "Troublemaker" broke five Guinness World Records. In May 2008, the album's third single, "The Greatest Man That Ever Lived (Variations on a Shaker Hymn)", was released. In 2008, Weezer unveiled the "Hootenanny Tour", in which fans would be invited to bring their own instruments to play along with the band.

The band toured in Japan at the beginning of September and then embarked on what was dubbed the "Troublemaker" tour. Angels and Airwaves and Tokyo Police Club joined the band as support at each show.

=== Raditude and Hurley (2009–2013) ===
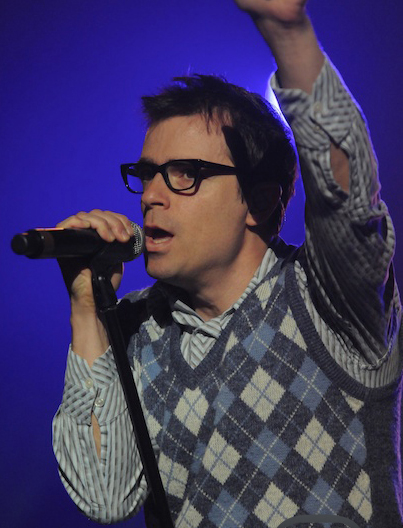
Cuomo performing with Weezer in July 2010

Weezer toured with Blink-182 in 2009, including an August 30 stop at the Virgin Festival at Merriweather Post Pavilion in Columbia, Maryland. Drummer Josh Freese joined Weezer on a temporary basis to play drums on the tour, while Wilson switched to guitar. Wilson said in an interview for Yahoo! Music that Cuomo wanted "to be active and more free on stage and him having guitar on was an impediment". Freese stated he was a Weezer fan and did not want to pass up the opportunity to play with the band.

On August 18, 2009, Weezer released the first single for their upcoming album, "If You're Wondering If I Want You To". The song peaked at No. 81 on the Billboard Hot 100. The album was titled Raditude which was a suggestion from actor Rainn Wilson. Raditude's album artwork was revealed on September 11, featuring a National Geographic contest-winning photograph of a jumping dog named Sidney. Raditude was released on November 3, 2009, where it debuted as the seventh best-selling album of the week on the Billboard 200 chart. The band scheduled tour dates in December 2009 extending into early 2010 to coincide with the new album's release. On December 6, 2009, Cuomo was injured when his tour bus crashed in Glen, New York due to black ice. Cuomo suffered three broken ribs and internal bleeding, and his assistant broke two ribs. His wife, baby daughter, and their nanny were also on the bus, but they escaped injury. Weezer cancelled the remaining 2009 tour dates the following day.

In December 2009, it was revealed that the band was no longer with Geffen Records. The band stated that new material would still be released, but the band members were unsure of the means, whether it be self-released, released online, or getting signed by another label. Eventually, the band was signed to the independent label Epitaph. Weezer co-headlined The Bamboozle, along with Paramore, in May 2010, and performed at the Bonnaroo Music and Arts Festival in Manchester, Tennessee in June. In August 2010, Weezer performed at the Reading and Leeds Festival, and performed at the Voodoo Experience festival in New Orleans, LA in October 2010.

The band's eighth album Hurley was released in September 2010 through Epitaph Records. The title comes from the character Hugo "Hurley" Reyes from the television show Lost. Jorge Garcia, the actor who portrayed Hurley, stated that being featured on the album cover is "one of the biggest honors of [his] career". The first single, "Memories", was chosen as part of the soundtrack for the 2010 film Jackass 3D with the music video featuring members of the cast contributing backing vocals. Weezer used internet streaming service YouTube as a way to promote the album. Weezer loaned itself to 15 amateur online video producers, "going along with whatever plans the creator could execute in about 30 minutes". The band was promoted through popular channels such as Barely Political and Fred Figglehorn. The Gregory Brothers solicited musical and vocal contributions from the band on one of its compositions built around speeches by representative Charles Rangel and U.S. President Barack Obama. Weezer called the promotion "The YouTube Invasion".

In November 2010, Weezer released a compilation album composed of re-recorded versions of unused recordings spanning from 1993 to 2010, Death to False Metal. The lead track, "Turning Up the Radio", was a collaborative effort with many fans on YouTube. On the same day, a deluxe version of Pinkerton, which includes "25 demos, outtakes and live tracks," was also released. A third volume of Cuomo's solo Alone series, titled Alone III: The Pinkerton Years, consisting of demos and outtakes from the Pinkerton sessions, was released on December 12, 2011. The band contributed a cover of the Monkees' "I'm a Believer" for the 2010 film Shrek Forever After as well as a cover of the Cars' "You Might Think" for the 2011 Disney-Pixar film Cars 2.

Weezer began working on their ninth studio album in September 2010 with the intent of a 2011 release, but the year ended without seeing a release. On October 8, 2011, former Weezer bassist Mikey Welsh was found dead from a suspected heroin overdose in a Chicago hotel room. Weezer performed in Chicago the next day and dedicated the concert to Welsh, who was expected to have attended. Welsh had previously joined Weezer on stage for a few performances between 2010 and 2011.

The band headlined a four-day music cruise, the Weezer Cruise, from Miami to Cozumel that set sail on January 19, 2012. In July, Weezer headlined the inaugural Bunbury Music Festival in Cincinnati, Ohio. In early 2013 the band brought its Memories Tour to Australia—the band's first Australian tour since 1996. The band played the Blue Album in full. The band also headlined the Punkspring 2013 tour in Japan and later in the year toured Canada and the United States. They played multiple nights in cities around the U.S. The band performed the Blue Album and Pinkerton in full at the Gibson Amphitheater in Los Angeles.

=== Everything Will Be Alright in the End and the "White Album" (2013–2016) ===
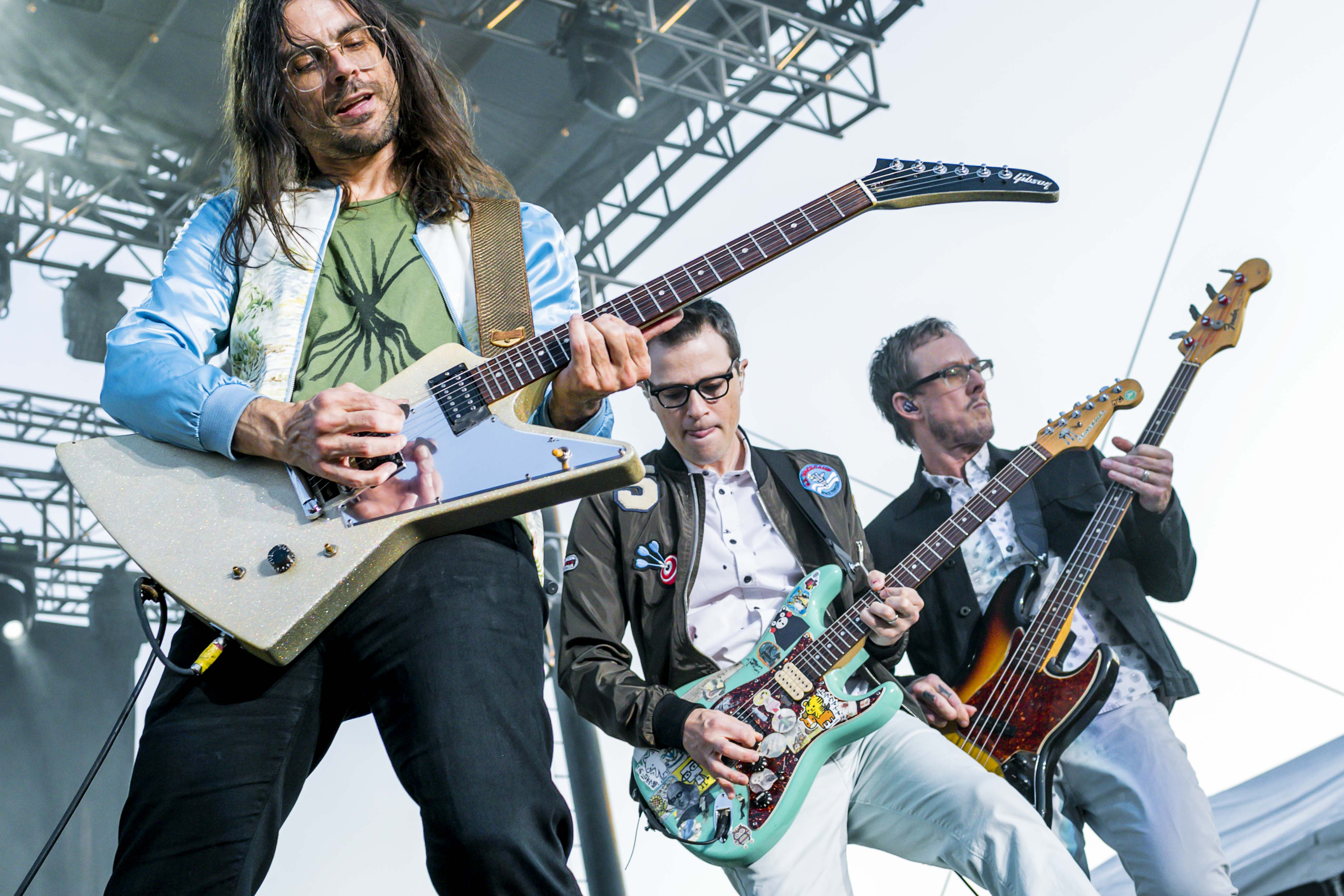
Weezer performing at the City of Trees Musical Festival in September 2016

In January 2014, Weezer began recording with producer Ric Ocasek, who had produced the "Blue Album" and the "Green Album". A clip of a new song was posted on the band's official YouTube account on March 19, 2014, which confirmed previous rumors of the band being in the studio. On June 12, 2014, it was revealed that the album title would be Everything Will Be Alright in the End. It was released on October 7, 2014 to generally favorable reviews, becoming the band's best-reviewed release since Pinkerton. On July 22, 2014, the first single, "Back to the Shack", was released. The song reached No. 5 on the Alternative Airplay chart.

Over 200 tracks were considered for Everything Will Be Alright in the End, but they were able to narrow it down to thirteen. According to the album's official press release, the album is organized thematically around three groups of songs: "Belladonna", "The Panopticon Artist" and "Patriarchia". "Belladonna" includes the songs "Ain't Got Nobody", "Lonely Girl", "Da Vinci", "Go Away", "Cleopatra" and "Return to Ithaka", all of which deal with Cuomo's relationships with women. Tracks under "The Panopticon Artist" include "Back to the Shack", "I've Had It Up To Here" and "The Waste Land" all deal with Cuomo's relationships with fans. The final group of songs, "Patriarchia", are "Eulogy for a Rock Band", "The British Are Coming", "Foolish Father" and "Anonymous", which deal with relationships with father figures, "with a new spin".

On October 26, 2015, the band released a new single, "Thank God for Girls". The following week, the band released a second single, "Do You Wanna Get High?". Cuomo claimed in an interview with Zane Lowe, that the band was not working on a new album. Later, on January 14, 2016, Weezer released a third single, "King of the World", and announced the "White Album", which continued the critical success of the band's previous release. Cuomo joined Tinder to meet with people to get inspired for new songs. He also started to explore other songwriting techniques including a cut-up technique, stream-of-consciousness, and writing melodies with a piano instead of guitar.

Weezer was officially released on April 1, 2016, and peaked at No. 4 on the Billboard 200. The album is considered a concept album exploring the themes of gender dynamics, modern dating experiences and references to religious iconography. It received a Grammy nomination for Best Rock Album for the 59th Annual Grammy Awards. Weezer performed on the Weezer & Panic! at the Disco Summer Tour 2016 with Panic! at the Disco in 2016. They later signed to Atlantic Records as part of a joint venture between Warner Music Group and Crush Management.

=== Pacific Daydream (2017–2018) ===
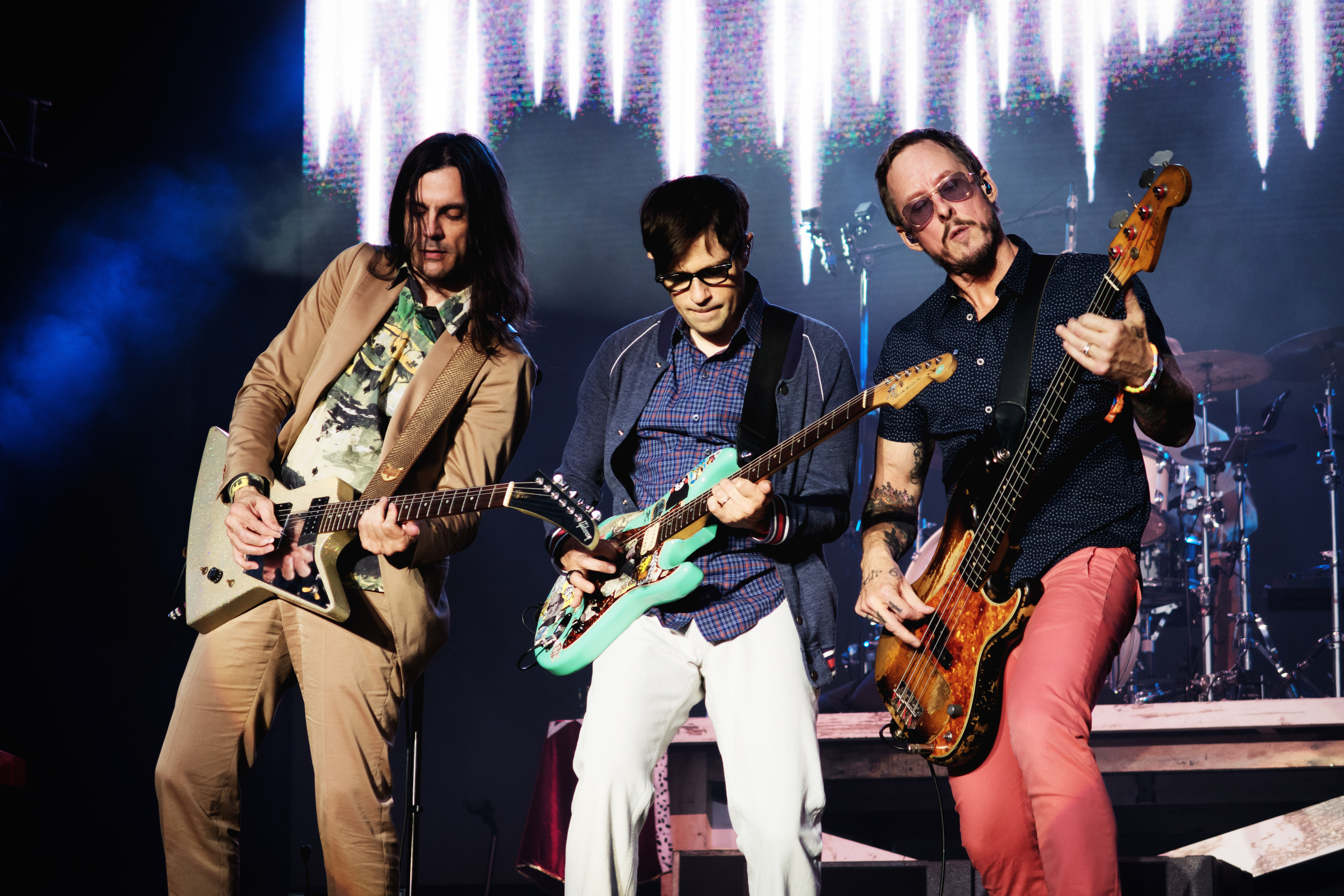
Weezer performing at Bumbershoot in September 2017

Soon after the release of the White Album, Cuomo discussed plans for Weezer's next album, provisionally titled the "Black Album". Cuomo said the album would tackle "more mature topics" and be "less summer day and more winter night", and suggested the band could return to the recording studio as soon as October 2016. Weezer delayed recording after Cuomo felt his new material was more "like reveries from a beach at the end of the world [... as if] the Beach Boys and the Clash fell in love by the ocean and had one hell of an amazing baby".

To write the album, Cuomo used various musical and lyrical fragments he had collected over time. He kept an archive of song ideas and hired programmers to organize a spreadsheet of lyric snippets by beats per minute, syllable, and key to call from whenever stuck. "Instead of trying to force myself to feel inspired, I can just go into the spreadsheet and search [...] I just try them out to see which ones work magically".

On March 16, 2017, Weezer released a new song, "Feels Like Summer", the lead single of the upcoming album. The song became their biggest hit on Alternative radio in a decade (peaking at number 2 on the Alternative Airplay chart ). On August 16, Weezer announced Pacific Daydream, released on October 27. On August 17, the promotional single from the album, "Mexican Fender", was released. The following month, "Beach Boys" was released, and the month after, they released "Weekend Woman" to positive reception. "Happy Hour" was the second single and reached No. 9 on the Alternative Airplay chart. The album received a Grammy nomination for Best Rock Album at the 61st Annual Grammy Awards.

=== The "Teal Album" and the "Black Album" (2018–2019) ===
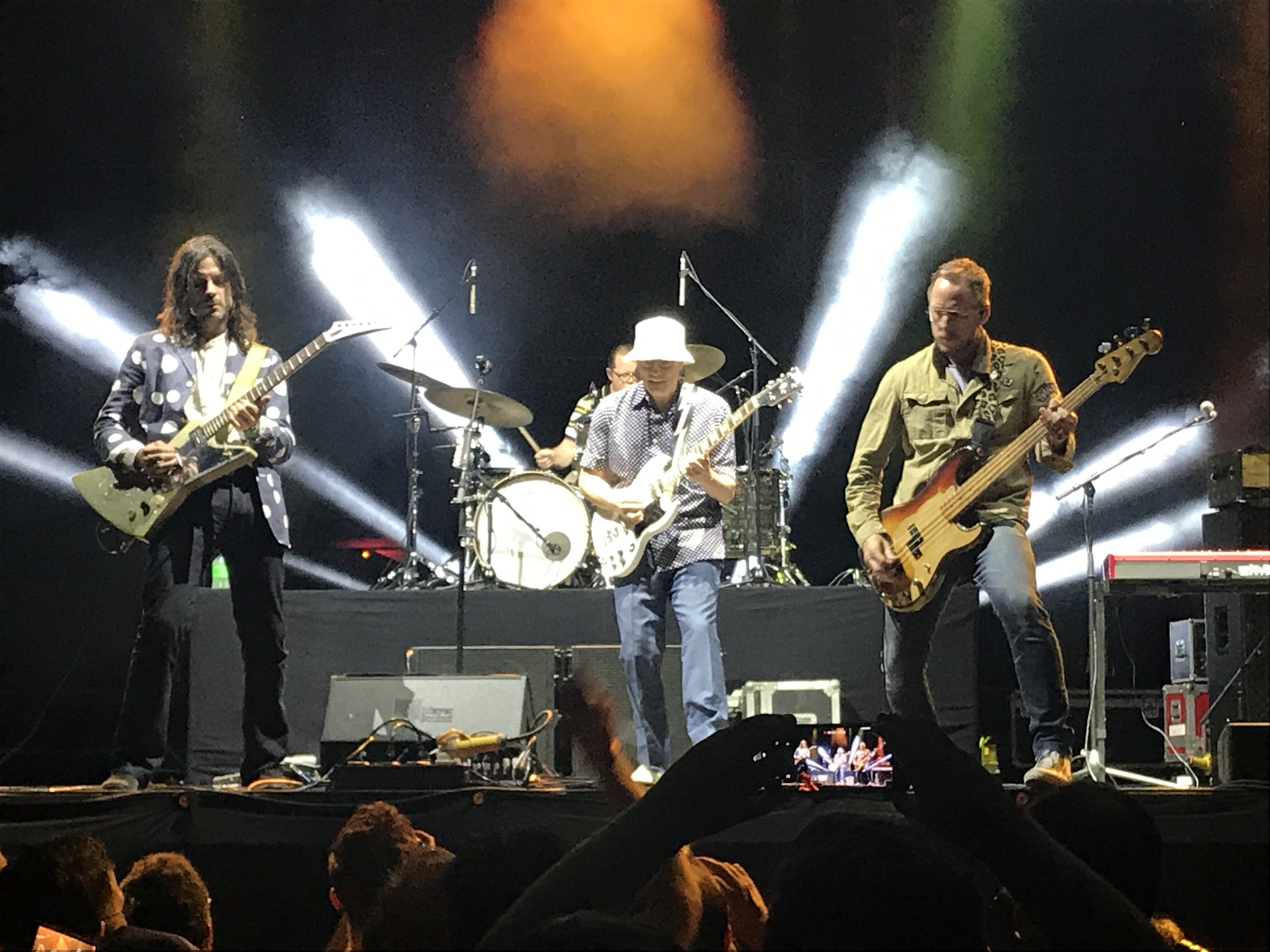
Weezer performing at Musikfest in Bethlehem, Pennsylvania in August 2019

Following a persistent Twitter campaign by a fan, Weezer released a cover of Toto's song "Africa" on May 29, 2018. Prior to this, the band released a cover of "Rosanna" to "troll" their fans. "Africa" reached number one on the Billboard Alternative Songs chart in August 2018, becoming the band's first number-one single since "Pork and Beans" in 2008. Two days later, on August 10, Toto responded by releasing a cover of Weezer's single "Hash Pipe". "Africa" eventually peaked at No. 51 on the Billboard Hot 100. The success of the "Africa" cover led Weezer to record an album of covers, the Teal Album, a surprise album released on January 24, 2019. The album was a commercial success with all tracks charting on the Hot Rock and Alternative Songs chart.

On September 20, 2018, Weezer released "California Snow" as a single for the 2018 film Spell. It was chosen as the closing track for the "Black Album". On October 11, 2018, Weezer released "Can't Knock the Hustle", the lead single from their upcoming album. On November 21, they released the second single, "Zombie Bastards", and announced the "Black Album", produced by Dave Sitek and released on March 1, 2019. An arena tour of the U.S. with the Pixies and supporting and international tour dates were also announced. On February 21, they released "High as a Kite" and "Living in LA" as the next singles. They would later play them on NPR Music to promote the album for their series of Tiny Desk Concerts.

=== OK Human and Van Weezer (2019–2021) ===
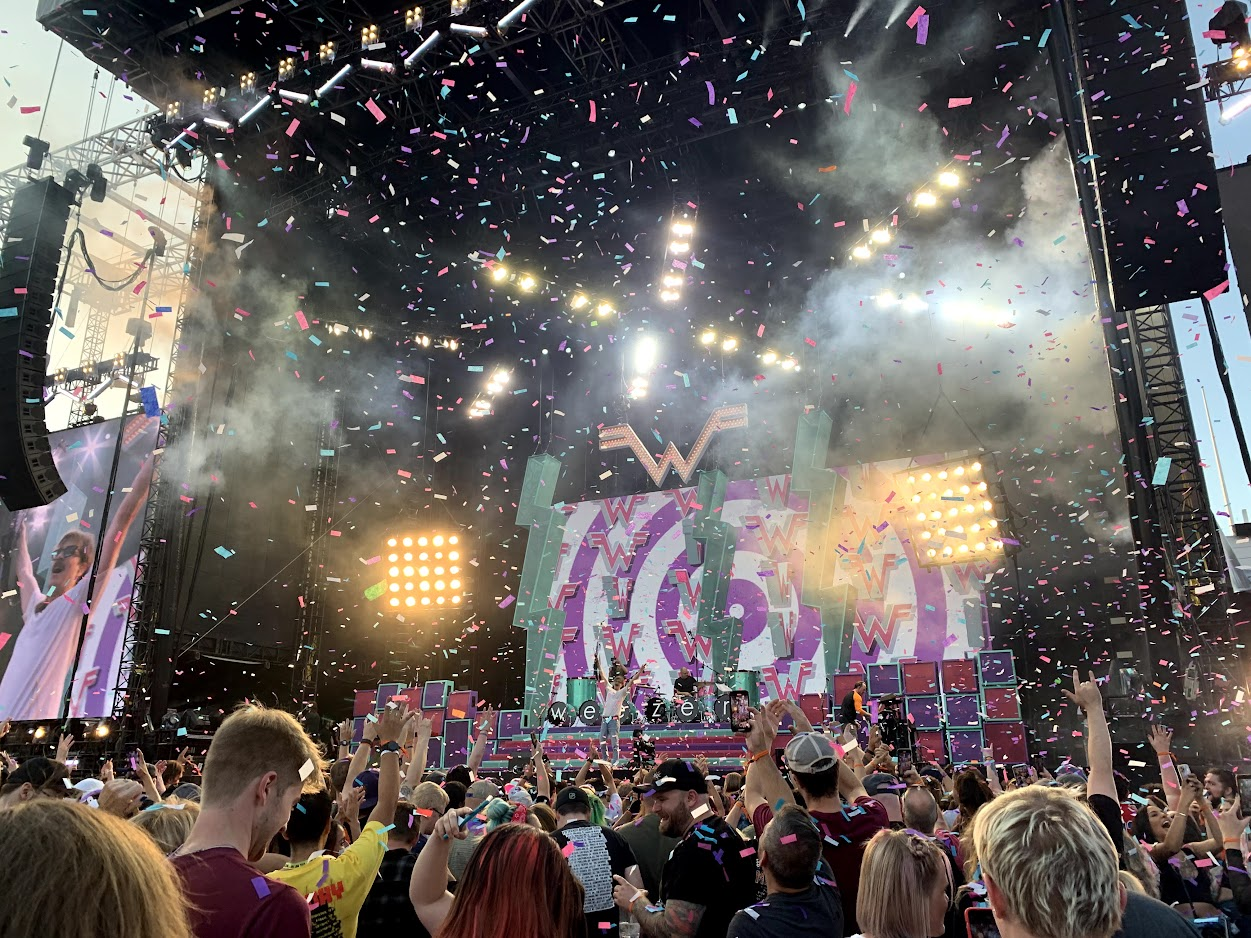
Weezer during the Hella Mega Tour at Dick's Sporting Goods Park in Commerce City, Colorado in August 2021

During a Beats 1 interview by Zane Lowe on Apple Music on January 24, 2019, Cuomo announced that Weezer had already recorded the "basic tracks" to the follow-up album to the "Black Album". The album, produced by Jake Sinclair (who also produced the White Album), would feature piano and strings-based songwriting and had already been recorded at Abbey Road Studios. For the recording process, Weezer departed from the modern "grid music" style (music recorded via modern software using grids to organize and manipulate the individual elements of recorded music) and did not perform to a "click" (i.e., metronome) for a more natural style. Furthermore, Cuomo said he was currently working on an album with the working title Van Weezer that harkened back to their heavier rock sound after noticing how crowds enjoy epic guitar solos at Weezer shows.

On September 10, 2019, the band announced the Hella Mega Tour with Green Day and Fall Out Boy as headliners alongside themselves, with the Interrupters as an opening act. They also released the opening single, "The End of the Game", off their fifteenth studio album, Van Weezer. The song reached No. 2 on the Alternative Airplay chart. Cuomo said that the band would return "back to big guitars". He remarked that when the band would perform "Beverly Hills" live in concert, he would perform a guitar solo that was not present on the recorded version of the song. "We noticed that, recently, the crowd just goes crazy when I do that. So it feels like maybe the audience is ready for some shredding again".

The band recorded a version of "Lost in the Woods" for the 2019 film Frozen II, which was included on the soundtrack album. The music video featuring the band and the Frozen voice actress Kristen Bell. On May 6, 2020, Weezer released the single and music video "Hero" a tribute to essential workers during the COVID-19 pandemic. Simultaneously, they announced the delay of Van Weezer for a time to be determined. The song reached No. 1 on the Alternative Airplay chart. On May 10, Weezer guest-starred on an episode of The Simpsons, "The Hateful Eight-Year Olds", where a snippet of their song "Blue Dream" from Van Weezer was played. On August 14, 2020, the third single, "Beginning of the End", was released as a part of the soundtrack for the 2020 film Bill & Ted Face the Music. On the same day, the band announced that the album had been delayed to May 2021 in order to coincide with the rescheduled Hella Mega Tour. On October 6, 2020, after Eddie Van Halen died, the album was dedicated to him. In addition to Van Halen, the album is also dedicated to Ric Ocasek, who produced the Blue Album, Green Album, and Everything Will Be Alright in the End, as Ocasek had died in September 2019.

On January 18, 2021, the band officially announced their fourteenth studio album, OK Human (a play on Radiohead's OK Computer). The announcement came with a release date of January 29. The album's opening track, "All My Favorite Songs", was released as a single with an alternate version featuring indie pop band AJR. The song reached No.1 on the Alternative Airplay chart and was later nominated for Best Rock Song in the 64th Annual Grammy Awards.

The album was planned to be released following Van Weezer, but when the album suffered a year-long delay following the COVID-19 pandemic, the band decided to shift their focus to completing OK Human first. Work on OK Human began as early as 2017, when the band decided to make an album that combined rock instrumentation with an orchestra. The band hired a 38-piece-orchestra and recorded the album entirely with analog equipment. The album was additionally inspired by the Beach Boys' Pet Sounds (1966) and Harry Nilsson's Nilsson Sings Newman (1970).

The fourth single, "I Need Some of That" was released on April 21, 2021. Van Weezer was released on May 7, 2021, along with an animated music video for "All the Good Ones". The album has been compared to their fourth studio album Maladroit, and is inspired by 1970s and 1980s hard rock and heavy metal bands such as Kiss, Black Sabbath, Metallica and Van Halen (the last of whom inspired the album's title).

=== SZNZ, touring and "Blue Album" 30th anniversary (2021–2026) ===
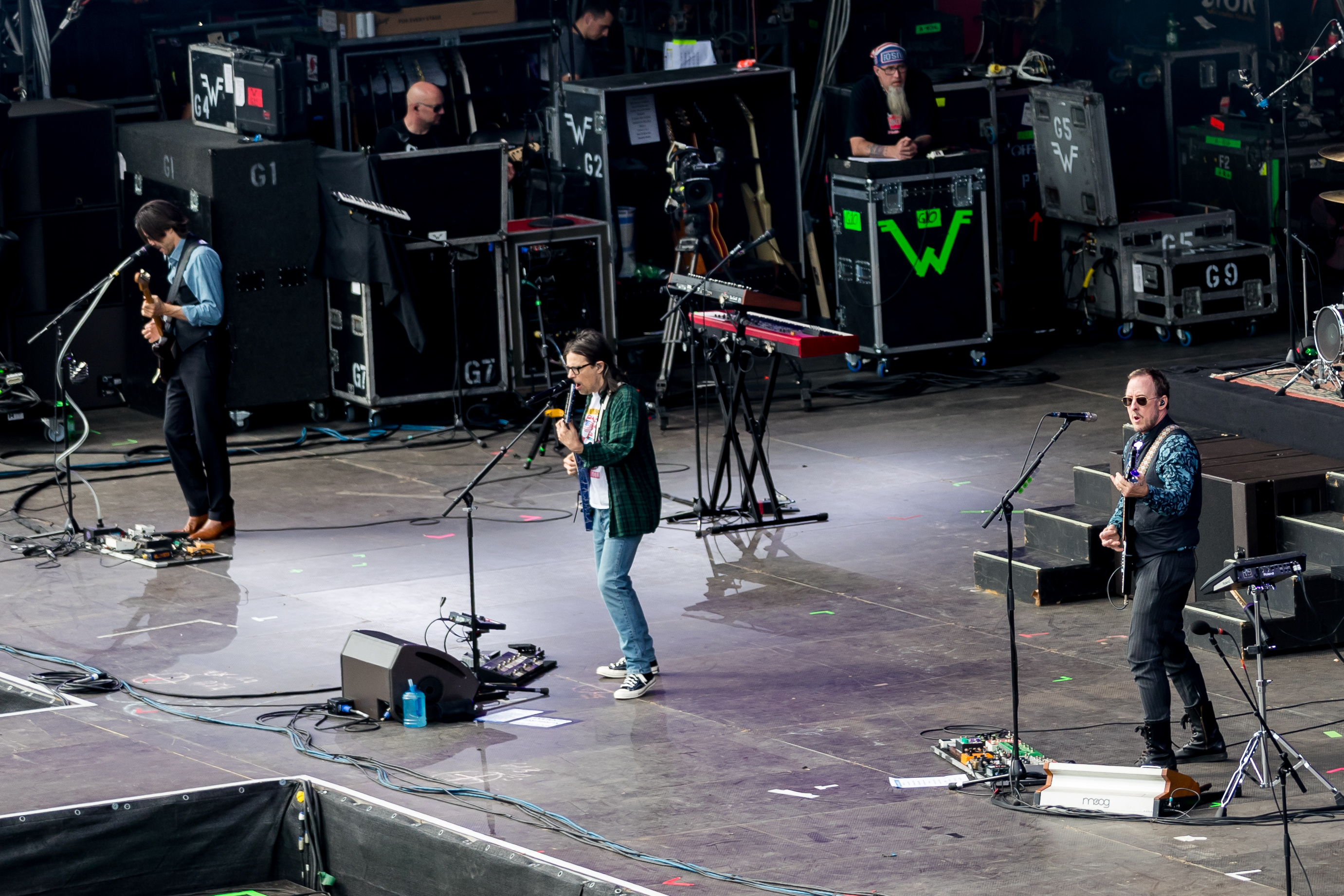
Weezer performing at Rock am Park in June 2022

After delays due to the pandemic, the American leg of the Hella Mega Tour began on July 24, 2021, in Arlington, Texas. The European leg saw Weezer, Green Day and Fall Out Boy performing in Austria, Belgium, the Netherlands, England, Ireland, Scotland and France.

On March 11, 2022, Weezer announced SZNZ, a series of four albums (originally designated as EPs) based on the seasons. The first, SZNZ: Spring, was released on March 20. The lead single, "A Little Bit of Love", was released on March 16, and reached No. 1 on the Alternative Airplay chart. On June 20, 2022, Weezer appeared on Jimmy Kimmel Live!, debuting "Records", the lead single from SZNZ: Summer, which also reached No. 1 on the Alternative Airplay chart. In August, a Broadway Theater residency planned for September 2022 was cancelled due to high expenses and poor ticket sales.

On September 19, 2022, Weezer performed again under the name Goat Punishment at Troubadour, Hollywood, where they played SZNZ: Winter for the first time. They also debuted the single "What Happens After You?" from SZNZ: Autumn, which was released on September 22, 2022. "What Happens After You?" was later performed on Jimmy Kimmel Live!. On December 9, 2022, Weezer released "I Want a Dog", the lead single from the last EP in the SZNZ series, SZNZ: Winter. SZNZ: Winter was released on December 21, 2022, alongside a music video for "Dark Enough To See The Stars". In mid-2023, Weezer performed several shows in North America as part of the Indie Rock Road Trip. In November 2023, Weezer appeared in the Netflix film Family Switch.

In June 2024, Weezer began a tour of the UK and Ireland with Smashing Pumpkins. Reviewing their performance at the O2 Arena, London, The Guardian wrote: "Thirty years on, Weezer still dole out taut, punchy, witty powerpop with self-effacing elan ... They are patently still in love with music". In September, Weezer, along with opening acts Dinosaur Jr. and The Flaming Lips, began their Voyage to the Blue Planet tour, in which they performed the Blue Album in its entirety for its 30th anniversary. On November 1, Weezer released a "Super Deluxe Edition" of the Blue Album. In April 2025, NME reported that Weezer is working on a mockumentary film depicting a rivalry between Weezer and Keanu Reeves's band Dogstar. The band co-headlined Riot Fest in September 2025 Chicago along with "Weird Al" Yankovic, Blink-182, Jack White, Green Day, and Idles. On October 18 and 19, 2025, Weezer performed at the When We Were Young festival in Las Vegas.

=== Gold Album and tour (2026–present) ===
In early 2026, the band's 2014 song "Go Away", featuring Bethany Cosentino, experienced a resurgence online through social media. This culminated in the song charting at 90 on the Billboard Hot 100, which marked the band's seventh song to chart. That March, Weezer announced a new tour titled "The Gathering", featuring openers the Shins and Silversun Pickups. In promotion, the band began "The Gathering – Initiation Week", events held across Los Angeles such as a trivia night and a pickleball tournament against the band themselves before they begin touring that fall. They performed a rooftop concert on March 27 in promotion as well, for which they brought out Cosentino to perform "Go Away". On April 1, the band released "Shine Again" as the lead single from their upcoming twentieth studio album. The band also signed with Reprise Records, which was revealed the same day.

On April 18, former Weezer bassist Matt Sharp released a restored version of the band's first studio recordings from November 1992, aptly titled 1192, for Record Store Day. The album features early recordings of songs from their debut album. On June 3, the band announced that their twentieth album, the Gold Album, would be released on August 21. They also released the album's second single, "We Might as Well Be Strangers", featuring American rock band Wednesday, on the same day. On August 5, the band released the album's third single, "C.E.O.", along with its music video, which included cameos from Rob Riggle, Curry Barker, Tony Hawk, Giovanni Ribisi, Michael Peña, and Christopher Mintz-Plasse, among others.

== Artistry ==
Weezer has been characterized as alternative rock, power pop, pop rock, pop-punk, slacker rock, emo, geek rock, indie rock, and emo pop. (Note: Musical styles: "alternative rock", "power pop", "pop rock", "pop-punk", "slacker rock"; "emo", "geek rock", "indie rock", "emo pop,") They have also incorporated pop, hard rock, heavy metal, arena rock, synth-pop, and orchestral pop. In 2022, James Hickie of Alternative Press dismissed the notion of Weezer as an emo band, writing: "Pinpointing exactly what Weezer are, musically, is harder than ever these days. [...] In the past five years alone, they've made albums of pop covers, orchestral pop and arena rock. Rivers Cuomo and co. are a lot of things [...] — inquisitive, inventive, musically restless — but absolutely not emo." Cuomo described Weezer was "an intentional paring down of guitar technique, song structure and lyrical persona so that it would be so innocent and unintentional and seem like we had just picked up our instruments 12 months before".

The members have listed influences such as Kiss (with direct references in the song "In the Garage"), Nirvana, the Pixies, the Cars (whose member Ric Ocasek produced several Weezer records), Cheap Trick, Pavement, Oasis, the Smashing Pumpkins, Green Day and Wax. Cuomo credited the Beach Boys as a major influence, specifically Pet Sounds (1966); Bell described Weezer's sound as "Beach Boys with Marshall stacks". Operas and musicals such as Madama Butterfly (1904) and Jesus Christ Superstar (1970) influenced Pinkerton and Songs from the Black Hole. The band members' deep appreciation for hard rock and heavy metal music was the source of inspiration behind Van Weezer, including 1970s and 1980s bands like Kiss, Black Sabbath, Metallica, Slayer, Rush, and Van Halen (the last of whom inspired the album's title). Weezer has used outer space as a theme on concert tours, which KTRU-LP likened to "theatre".

=== Instrumentation and lyrics ===
Weezer's music is generally characterized by loud guitars, abundance of hooks, and perceived nerdiness. According to Stephen Thomas Erlewine of AllMusic, the band's style "merges the heavy power pop of arena rockers like Cheap Trick and the angular guitar leads of the Pixies while injecting their melodies with doses of '70s metal". Throughout its career, Weezer has maintained what has been described as a "heavy, guitar-oriented sound [played] over a steady, danceable groove". The band's early material, such as the material on its debut album, was said to have "embodied the self-awareness of the intelligent alternative rock slacker". According to Tim Sendra of AllMusic, the group's debut album "fuses the raucous energy of punk, the loser-friendly geekiness of indie rock, the guitar power of grunge, and the huge hooks of radio rock [combined with] some heavy metal guitar heroics". The sound present on the band's second album, Pinkerton, has been described as "darker [and] messier" than its predecessor. Green was considered to be a return to the "tight" pop sound of Weezer's debut album. According to Erlewine, Maladroit features "a tougher sound -- nowhere near as raw as Pinkerton, yet similarly loud and raucous, overflowing with guitars spitting out riffs and solos with a gleeful abandon". 2005's Make Believe was considered to be a "return to [the] musical, emotional bloodletting" of Pinkerton. On Red, the band began to incorporate longer song forms. Raditude (2009) and Hurley (2010) both featured more modern pop production. Everything Will Be Alright in the End (2014) was considered to be a return to form. White (2016) and Pacific Daydream (2017) retained the band's power pop sound, but also demonstrated influences from the Beach Boys. Black (2019) was described as pop rock, and a "pop/electronic hybrid". OK Human (2021) went for a different sound entirely, being described as orchestral pop, chamber pop, and baroque pop. Van Weezer (2021) went for a hard rock, glam metal, and arena rock sound.

The band's aesthetic and lyrics have been described as "blurring the line between serious and humorous". The lyrical tone on Pinkerton has been described as "confessional". According to Erlewine, "None of the members of Weezer, especially leader Rivers Cuomo, were conventional rockers: they were kids who holed up in their garage to play along with their favorite records when they weren't studying or watching TV. As a result, their music is infused with a quirky sense of humor and an endearing awkwardness".

== Legacy and influence ==
Weezer has sustained a cult following throughout its career. Stephen Thomas Erlewine conferred the title of "alt-rock icons of the '90s" on Weezer, and also called them "one of the most popular groups to emerge in the post-grunge alternative rock aftermath". James Hickie of Alternative Press Magazine stated that the band's second album Pinkerton is "considered something of an emo cornerstone", and stated his belief that it influenced "a generation of emo bands", despite Weezer not being an outright emo band. Weezer has sold 10 million albums in the United States and over 35 million worldwide.

Artists such as Paramore, Fun., Olivia Rodrigo, Pete Wentz, Fall Out Boy, Panic! at the Disco, Blink-182, Steve Lacy, Taylor Swift, Charli XCX, Mac DeMarco, Finn Wolfhard, Real Estate Dinosaur Pile-Up, Cymbals Eat Guitars, DNCE, Ozma, Wavves, Joyce Manor, Origami Angel,, and the Fall of Troy cite Weezer as an influence.

== Solo work and side projects ==
Wilson started his side-project the Special Goodness in 1996, for which he sings and plays guitar and bass. In May 2012, he released his fourth record with the Special Goodness, Natural. Bell started the Space Twins in 1994. They released an album, The End of Imagining, in 2003. In 2006, Bell started a new band called the Relationship, and did not contribute any songs for Weezer's Raditude to save material for the Relationship. The Relationship's self-titled debut was released in 2010, with a follow-up, Clara Obscura, in 2017.

Former bassist Matt Sharp started the Rentals in 1994. After releasing Return of the Rentals in 1995, Sharp went on to quit Weezer in 1998 to focus more on the Rentals. Sharp has also released work under his own name. Mikey Welsh toured with Juliana Hatfield and played bass for the Kickovers. Scott Shriner played bass for Anthony Green's debut studio album Avalon (2008).

On December 18, 2007, Cuomo released Alone: The Home Recordings of Rivers Cuomo, a compilation of his demos recorded from 1992 to 2007, including some demos from the unfinished Songs from the Black Hole album. A second compilation, Alone II: The Home Recordings of Rivers Cuomo, was released on November 25, 2008, and a third, Alone III: The Pinkerton Years, on December 12, 2011. The album was sold exclusively with a book, The Pinkerton Diaries, which collects Cuomo's writings from the Pinkerton era.

On March 20, 2013, Cuomo and Scott Murphy of the band Allister released Scott & Rivers, a Japanese-language album. They released their second album in April 2017. In November 2020, Cuomo released thousands of unreleased songs and demos from throughout Weezer's career on his website for purchase and download.

== Musical contributions ==
In 1994, Weezer contributed the song "Jamie" to DGC Rarities Vol. 1, which is a compilation of demos, B-sides, and covers recorded by bands on the label. It was the first appearance of the song until it was released as a B-side for the single of "Buddy Holly" and again on the Blue Album Deluxe Edition. In 1999, Weezer contributed a cover of the song "Velouria" by The Pixies to the tribute album Where Is My Mind? A Tribute To The Pixies. On July 22, 2003, Weezer contributed an acoustic cover of Green Day's "Worry Rock" to the compilation album A Different Shade of Green: A Tribute to Green Day. On December 5, 2008, Tap Tap Revenge developer Tapulous released the game Christmas with Weezer and six Christmas carols performed by the band. A digital EP featuring the songs, titled Christmas with Weezer, was also released on December 16, 2008.

On March 9, 2010, Weezer appeared on an episode of the children's daytime television show Yo Gabba Gabba! and performed the song "All My Friends Are Insects". The song appeared on a compilation soundtrack album for the show, Yo Gabba Gabba! Music Is...Awesome! Volume 2, as well as a bonus track for the Weezer album Hurley. On June 11, 2010, the band released a new single, "Represent", as an "unofficial" anthem for the US Men's soccer team to coincide with the 2010 FIFA World Cup. Although technically unofficial, the song was embraced by the team, and on June 23, 2010, US Soccer released a music video on their official YouTube channel featuring dramatic footage of the US team spliced with footage of Weezer performing.

In 2010, the band recorded a cover of "I'm a Believer" by the Monkees for the movie Shrek Forever After. Previously, Weezer had planned to include an early version of "My Best Friend" from Make Believe in Shrek 2, but it was replaced by "Accidentally in Love" by Counting Crows. In 2011, the band covered "You Might Think" by The Cars for the Pixar movie Cars 2. The song appears on the movie's official soundtrack. In 2011, Weezer recorded a cover of "Rainbow Connection" with Hayley Williams for Muppets: The Green Album, a cover album of Muppets songs which also included OK Go, The Fray, Alkaline Trio, and others.

On September 20, 2018, Weezer released "California Snow" for the film Spell, which Cuomo also provided voicework for. The song later appeared on the Black Album. In 2019, Weezer recorded a cover of "Lost In the Woods" for the Frozen II soundtrack. In 2020–2021, Weezer released "It's Always Summer in Bikini Bottom" for The SpongeBob Movie: Sponge on the Run's film soundtrack. In June 2021, Weezer contributed the song "Tell Me What You Want" to the video game Wave Break. The song is featured in a special level of the game called "Weezy Mode". In August 2021, Weezer contributed a cover of Metallica's "Enter Sandman" to The Metallica Blacklist, a compilation of Metallica song covers by various artists, with each song getting several covers by different artists. In October 2025, Weezer contributed a cover of Tom Petty and the Heartbreakers' "Here Comes My Girl" to the soundtrack of the Apple TV+ series Bad Monkey.

== Band members ==
Current members

- Rivers Cuomo – lead vocals, guitar (1992–present); keyboards (1993–present)
- Patrick Wilson – drums (1992–present), occasional backing and lead vocals (1993, 2007–2012, 2018–2020, 2025–present); guitar (2007–2012, 2025–present), keyboards (2007–2012)
- Brian Bell – guitar, backing and occasional lead vocals (1993–present), keyboards (2004–present)
- Scott Shriner – bass, backing and occasional lead vocals (2001–present), keyboards (2007–present)

Current touring musicians

- Josh Freese – drums (2007–2012, 2025)

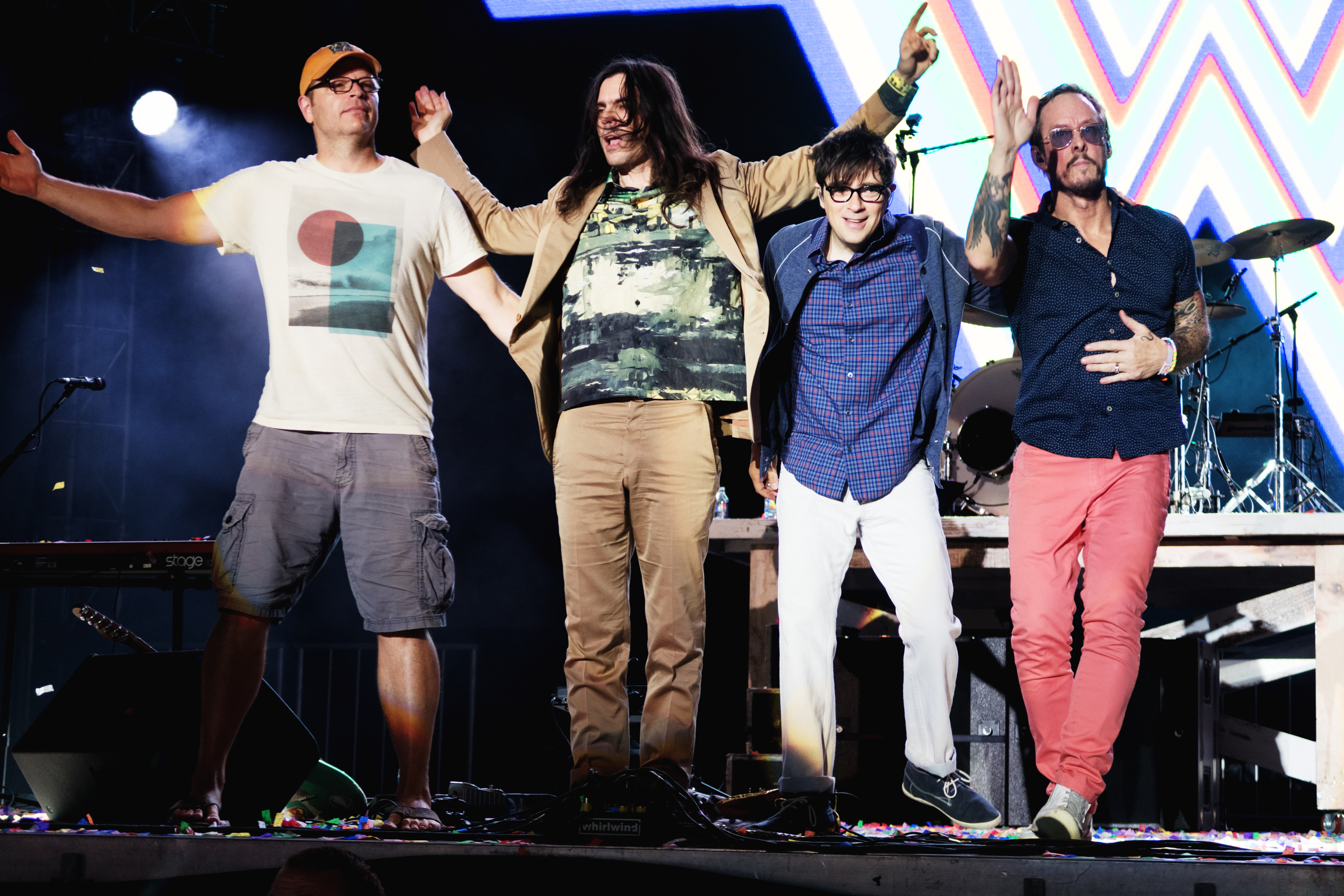
Weezer at the 2017 Bumbershoot music festival. From left to right: Patrick Wilson, Brian Bell, Rivers Cuomo, and Scott Shriner.

Former members

- Jason Cropper – guitar, backing vocals (1992–1993)
- Matt Sharp – bass, backing vocals (1992–1998)
- Mikey Welsh – bass, backing vocals (1998–2001; died 2011)

Former touring musicians

- Bobby Schneck – keyboards, guitar (2000–2005)
- Daniel Brummel – keyboards, guitar (2012–2014)
- Dave Elitch – drums (2022; substitute for Patrick Wilson)

Assistant Karl Koch is generally considered an unofficial "fifth member" of Weezer due to his long-standing association with the band. Since the band's inception, he has assumed multiple different roles, including roadie, concert photographer, webmaster, social media manager, archivist, historian, and art director, in addition to being a percussionist on "Butterfly" from Pinkerton and co-writing "The Show Must Go On" from the Gold Album.

Timeline

== Discography ==
Studio albums

- Weezer (Blue Album) (1994)
- Pinkerton (1996)
- Weezer (Green Album) (2001)
- Maladroit (2002)
- Make Believe (2005)
- Weezer (Red Album) (2008)
- Raditude (2009)
- Hurley (2010)
- Everything Will Be Alright in the End (2014)
- Weezer (White Album) (2016)
- Pacific Daydream (2017)
- Weezer (Teal Album) (2019)
- Weezer (Black Album) (2019)
- OK Human (2021)
- Van Weezer (2021)
- SZNZ (2022) (Note: Four SZNZ releases were classified as individual EPs upon their original releases (SZNZ: Spring, SZNZ: Summer, SZNZ: Autumn, and SZNZ: Winter). All four were initially released in 2022. They were reclassified as studio album(s) following the release of Weezer (Gold Album) in 2026.)
- Weezer (Gold Album) (2026)

== Awards and nominations ==
=== Grammy Awards ===
The Grammy Award is an award presented by the Recording Academy to recognize achievement in the mainly English-language music industry. Weezer has received one award from five nominations, with one pending.

Year	Nominee / work	Award	Result
2006	"Beverly Hills"	Best Rock Song	Nominated
2009	"Pork and Beans"	Best Music Video (Director: Mathew Cullen)	Won
2017	Weezer	Best Rock Album	Nominated
2019	Pacific Daydream	Best Rock Album	Nominated
2022	"All My Favorite Songs"	Best Rock Song	Nominated
2027	Coloring Book	Best Recording Package	Pending

=== iHeartRadio Music Awards ===
The iHeartRadio Music Award was founded by iHeartRadio in 2014. From 2014 to 2018 the event was broadcast live on NBC, and in 2019 the event was broadcast on FOX.

Year	Nominee / work	Award	Result
2019	"Africa"	Alternative Rock Song of the Year	Nominated
2019	"Africa"	Best Cover Song	Nominated
2023	Weezer	Alternative Artist of the Year	Nominated

=== Kerrang! Awards ===
Year	Nominee / work	Award	Result
2008	"Pork and Beans"	Best Video	Nominated

=== MTV Europe Music Awards ===
The MTV Europe Music Award is an award presented by Viacom International Media Networks Europe to honour artists and music in popular culture.

Year	Nominee / work	Award	Result
1995	Weezer	Best New Act	Nominated
1995	"Buddy Holly"	Best Video (Director: Spike Jonze)	Nominated
2008	"Pork and Beans"	Best Video (Director: Mathew Cullen)	Nominated

=== MTV Video Music Awards ===
The MTV Video Music Award is an award presented by the cable channel MTV to honor the best in the music video medium. Weezer has received five awards from eight nominations.

Year	Nominee / work	Award	Result
1995	"Buddy Holly"	Video of the Year	Nominated
1995	"Buddy Holly"	Best Alternative Video	Won
1995	"Buddy Holly"	Breakthrough Video	Won
1995	"Buddy Holly"	Best Direction (Director: Spike Jonze)	Won
1995	"Buddy Holly"	Best Editing (Editor: Eric Zumbrunnen)	Won
2001	"Hash Pipe"	Best Rock Video	Nominated
2005	"Beverly Hills"	Best Rock Video	Nominated
2008	"Pork and Beans"	Best Editing (Editor: Jeff Consiglio and Colin Woods)	Won

=== Teen Choice Awards ===
The Teen Choice Awards were established in 1999 to honor the year's biggest achievements in music, movies, sports and television, being voted by young people aged between 13 and 19.

Year	Nominee / work	Award	Result
2005	"Beverly Hills"	Choice Music: Rock Song	Nominated
