= Cleopatra (Weezer song) =

Single by Weezer

from the album Everything Will Be Alright in the End
- Released: September 8, 2014
- Recorded: 2014
- Genre: Alternative rock; power pop
- Length: 3:13
- Label: Republic
- Songwriter: Rivers Cuomo
- Producer: Ric Ocasek

Weezer singles chronology
"Back to the Shack" (2014)	"Cleopatra" (2014)	"Da Vinci" (2014)

"Cleopatra" is a song by the American rock band Weezer. It was released as the second single from their ninth studio album Everything Will Be Alright in the End on September 8, 2014. Like the previous single "Back to the Shack", the song has received favorable comparisons to Weezer's earlier albums.

== Composition ==
A jangly Egyptian-themed song, "Cleopatra" is described as a throwback to Weezer's classic sound. The song starts with acoustic strums, a harmonica, and subdued vocals. It builds up into a heavier song, containing a guitar solo and dual guitars. Chris Coplan at Consequence of Sound characterized the song as sounding more like Weezer (1994) than Pinkerton.

== Critical reception ==
Carolyn Menyes at Music Times comments that "it seems like the band has finally returned to form after all these years", citing "Cleopatra" as an example. Dandiel Kreps of Rolling Stone declared "The track recalls the band's earlier albums", citing the production by Ric Ocasek. At Consequence of Sound, Chris Coplan states that "Weezer keep things interesting by imbuing the track with a healthy dose of experience and cynicism, adding new layers to a sound that can occasionally be all too familiar." Karina Starobina from Gigwise described the song "as much a perfect soundtrack for a college pool party as any other Weezer song you have ever heard.". Starobina also comments they don't want Weezer to change.
