= Music cruise =

Themed cruise ship experience

A music cruise is a type of cruise ship tourism whose purpose centers around a musician, band, or musical lineup with performances by the act or acts and interaction between the cruise-goers and the stars. Music cruises can be thematic in genre, such as jazz, blues, rock, a musical era such as the 1980s, country, and others, or may center around a particular musician, band or related bands. Music cruises feature musical performances by the act or acts, and involve social activities between fans and cruise performers such as Meet and Greets, question and answer sessions, and parties.

Music cruises have grown in popularity significantly in the United States since the 1990s, to the point of popular music festivals such as Coachella are offering at-sea versions of their concert series and band such as Kiss, Weezer, Motörhead, and solo acts like Kid Rock have done music cruises. While music cruises usually have an older demographic, there are still concerns about alcohol-related incidents taking place on board.

Examples of music cruises include Holy Ship! – held annually since 2012 – and Jam Cruise – held fourteen times since 2004 – both of which sail out of PortMiami.

== See also ==
- Booze cruise
