= Back to the Shack =

Single by Weezer

from the album Everything Will Be Alright in the End
- Released: July 22, 2014
- Recorded: 2014
- Genre: Alternative rock; power pop
- Length: 3:07
- Label: Republic
- Songwriters: Rivers Cuomo; Jacob Kasher Hindlin
- Producer: Ric Ocasek

Weezer singles chronology
"Hang On" (2011)	"Back to the Shack" (2014)	"Cleopatra" (2014)

Music video
- "Back to the Shack" on YouTube

"Back to the Shack" is a song by the American rock band Weezer. It was released as the first single from their ninth studio album Everything Will Be Alright in the End on July 22, 2014. The song was sent to radio stations and uploaded to Weezer's YouTube channel a day before the single's official release. It was written in response to the band's past several albums, with lead vocalist Rivers Cuomo wanting to return to their roots. The song received generally favorable reviews.

== Background and composition ==
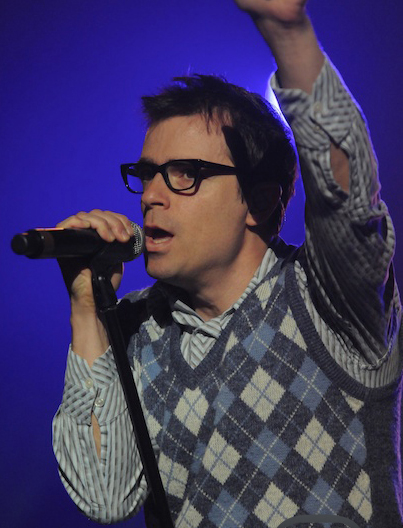
Rivers Cuomo (pictured) co-wrote the song.

"Back to the Shack" was written by Rivers Cuomo and Jacob Kasher Hindlin. The song was produced by Ric Ocasek. Cuomo wrote a majority of the song, with Karl Koch describing Jacob Kasher Hindlin's contribution to the song as "randomly singing out the title while hanging out on the couch listening to [Rivers Cuomo] strumming the song. It doesn't take much to get half a songwriting credit." At one point, the song was performed with the bridge containing the lyric "we belong in the rock zone", before Cuomo, based on fan suggestions changed it from "rock zone" to "rock world". Regarding the composition of the song, Cuomo stated that he "tried to find different melodies and different beats and all these different things". Further, he stated that as he "couldn't crack the code" they had to go ahead and record it anyway. Ocasek introduced a synth melody line to the song during this period.

Cuomo explained that the lyrics refer to how he feels bad for the direction the band has taken on some of their past material. He admitted that sometimes he "went over the edge". He explained his desire to create "a classic alt-rock record". The "shack" serves as a reference to Amherst house, a home where some of the original Weezer members had lived and recorded a few of their demos.

Lyrically, "Back to the Shack" deals with the theme of nostalgia and a wish to return "to [the band's] 1994 roots". Dave Lewis stated the song serves as a thematic continuation of two previous Weezer songs, "In the Garage" and "Memories". It also deals with Weezer's relationship with their fans and serves as "basically an apology for the past two decades and a promise to embrace their nerdy roots." The song's opening lines—"I'm sorry guys, I didn't realize that I needed you so much"—in particular reinforce this theme. The song has been categorized under alternative rock and power pop.

== Critical reception ==
"Back to the Shack" received generally positive reviews from contemporary music critics. Carolyn Menyes from Music Times regarded "Back to the Shack" to be instrumentally similar to the band's second album Pinkerton, and stated that the song "features hooks for days, and the turn of events in the chorus is nothing short of a pure earworm." Mike Ayers of The Wall Street Journal described the song as "three minutes of pure Weezer joy", particularly for "its simple, yet heavy riffs and self-deprecating lyrics", while Spin critic Colin Joyce complimented the song for its "anthemic choruses and guitar anti-heroics". HitFix reviewer Dave Lewis called the song "generic rock", although he went on to compliment the middle eight and considered the song as a whole to be "a lot more promising", than their more recent releases.

Chris Payne of Billboard ranked it as the band's fifth best lead single, beating out "Hash Pipe", "(If You're Wondering If I Want You To) I Want You To", "Pork and Beans", and "Memories". Hilary Hughes of Fuse praised it as a return to the band's old sound, saying "a promising look at what's sure to be a satisfying listen for new and old fans alike." Ian Rogers from The Vine commented that it "Sounds exactly like a highly professional, crassly commercial L.A. rock band performing a Weezer-styled song about Weezer returning to their roots."

== Release and live performances ==
"Back to the Shack" was released as the first single from Everything Will Be Alright in the End on July 22, 2014. The day before its release, the song was sent to radio stations, and uploaded to the band's YouTube channel.

Prior to release, the song was performed in February during the 2014 Weezer Cruise. The band performed it on The Tonight Show Starring Jimmy Fallon on July 23, the song's first performance on television. In August, the song was played during Musikfest.

== Music video ==
The music video for "Back to the Shack" was directed by Warren Fu and released on September 29, 2014. The video features the band performing the song on the moon.

== Chart performance ==
=== Weekly charts ===
Weekly chart performance for "Back to the Shack"
Chart (2014)	Peak position
Canada Hot 100 (Billboard)	72
Canada Rock (Billboard)	1
CIS Airplay (TopHit)	200
Japan Hot 100 (Billboard)	64
Mexico Ingles Airplay (Billboard)	35
US Hot Rock & Alternative Songs (Billboard)	13
US Rock & Alternative Airplay (Billboard)	4

=== Year-end charts ===
Year-end chart performance for "Back to the Shack"
Chart (2014)	Position
US Hot Rock Songs (Billboard)	50
US Rock Airplay (Billboard)	19
