= Indie Rock Road Trip =

2023 concert tour by Weezer

- Tour by Weezer
- Promotional poster for the tour
- Location: Canada; United States
- Associated albums: SZNZ: Spring; Summer; Autumn; Winter
- Start date: June 4, 2023
- End date: September 3, 2023
- Legs: 1
- No. of shows: 30
- Supporting acts: Future Islands; Joyce Manor; Modest Mouse; Momma; Spoon; White Reaper

Weezer concert chronology
- Hella Mega Tour (2021–2022); Indie Rock Road Trip (2023); UK & Ireland Tour (2024)

The Indie Rock Road Trip was a concert tour by the American rock band Weezer. It was announced in February 2023 and lasted from June to September of that year, with 29 concerts in the United States and one in Canada. The tour supported the band's SZNZ project, which saw four EPs released in 2022. Supporting acts included Future Islands, Joyce Manor, Modest Mouse, Momma, Spoon, and White Reaper. The tour received positive reviews from critics.

== Background and development ==
Weezer officially announced a concert tour for mid-2023 on February 27 of that year. It would be their first tour since the Hella Mega Tour in mid-2022, which Weezer co-headlined alongside Fall Out Boy and Green Day. Following that tour, the band had initially planned for a concert residency on Broadway, though this never came to fruition, with the band citing "low ticket sales and unbelievably high expenses". The 2023 tour would support the band's SZNZ project, which involved four EPs released the previous year—Spring, Summer, Autumn, and Winter.

The tour was scheduled to begin on June 4 in Huntsville, Alabama, and conclude on September 3 in San Diego, with a total of 30 shows. Supporting acts for the tour included Future Islands, Joyce Manor, Modest Mouse, Momma, Spoon, and White Reaper. Almost every show would include two of these bands, with Future Islands performing with Joyce Manor, Modest Mouse performing with Momma, and Spoon performing with White Reaper. The sole exception to this was the July 9 performance in Gary, Indiana, which would not feature Future Islands. Tickets, which could be purchased via Ticketmaster, became available on Mach 3, with a presale on March 2.

In addition to the tour, Weezer planned to perform at several music festivals throughout 2023. On April 24, the band performed at the Glass House in Pomona, California, which David Brendan Hall of Uproxx called a "warm-up" for the tour. For about a week prior to their first performance, the band rehearsed at the Orion Amphitheater in Huntsville, which would also be the first location on their tour. On June 3, the day prior to their first show, they performed a set at the Railbird Festival in Lexington, Kentucky.

== Concert synopsis ==
Following the opening acts, an instrumental version of "Africa" by Toto played to announce the beginning of Weezer's performance. Following this, a large curtain dropped to reveal their stage, which was decorated to resemble the dashboard of a station wagon as part of the "road trip" theme for the tour. This included a structure bearing a steering wheel and large knobs for a car radio. During their performance, members of the band sometimes interacted with the structure in a comedic way. Patrick Wilson, the band's drummer, played from atop this structure while the rest of the band played on the stage below it. Behind the "dashboard" was a large screen resembling a car's windshield. While the screen mostly showed cartoonish illustrations of road trip scenes, it sometimes aired live footage of the crowd.

The band opened their performance by playing "My Name Is Jonas", the first song from their debut album. Following this, their next several songs were primarily ones that they had first released in the 1990s, with several from their debut album and follow-up album, Pinkerton. This included some of their most well-known songs, such as "El Scorcho" and "Undone – The Sweater Song". About a third of the way into their performance, lead singer Rivers Cuomo told the crowd they would be performing some of their less well-known songs. Throughout the tour, the band tried to play one unique and lesser-known song from their discography at each venue. At their Pittsburgh performance, Cuomo justified this by telling the crowd, "We've put out 401 songs since we started and we don't get to do a lot of them." This interlude also included some acoustic renditions of their songs, such as "Endless Bummer", and included personal recollections from Cuomo regarding the background for the songs. Following this part, the final stretch of songs included more well-known hits, such as "Say It Ain't So", "Hash Pipe", and "Island in the Sun". In total, their performance lasted about 90 minutes.

While a total of nine albums were represented in the band's set, many of the songs played came from their earlier albums. Only one song was from the band's SZNZ EPs—"Thank You and Good Night". For several of the songs, the band changed the lyrics slightly. For instance, during their performance of "Susanne", Cuomo used the line "even Kurt Cobain and Axl Rose" (which had been the line in the original lyrics) instead of "even Izzy, Slash and Axl Rose" (the lyrics used in the released version of the song). Additionally, in "El Scorcho", Cuomo replaced a reference to Green Day with a self-deprecating reference to themselves. The tour also saw several musicians provide additional support. For instance, in Pittsburgh, Barry Johnson of Joyce Manor provided additional guitar and vocals during "You Gave Your Love to Me Softly", while Serena Ryder provided vocals during the band's performance of "I Just Threw Out the Love of My Dreams" during their Toronto show. Additionally, while he did not perform with the band, Jack White of The White Stripes was present during the band's Huntsville performance.

== Critical reception ==
The tour received positive reviews from critics. Théoden Janes of The Charlotte Observer highlighted the "corny" nature of the concert in a positive way, saying that it resonated well with the fans in attendance. Alex Hudson of Exclaim! called the Toronto concert "pure fan service, highlighting the best of the band's spotty catalogue as they fully embraced their dorkiness". Their show in Pittsburgh received praise from both Scott Mervis of the Pittsburgh Post-Gazette and Mike Palm of the Pittsburgh Tribune-Review. Brittne Lunniss of The Stranger said of their performance in Auburn, Washington, "Weezer's entire set sounded like a recording—flawless, consistent, masterful".

== Set list ==
The following set list was obtained from the July 11 concert held at Stage AE in Pittsburgh. Other concerts may have had slightly different set lists, as Cuomo said that they tried to perform one unique and "infrequently used song" from their discography at each venue.

The final two songs listed here ("Surf Wax America" and "Buddy Holly") were performed as part of an encore.

1. "My Name Is Jonas"
2. "Beverly Hills"
3. "Return to Ithaka"
4. "The Good Life"
5. "Pork and Beans"
6. "Pink Triangle"
7. "El Scorcho"
8. "You Gave Your Love to Me Softly"
9. "Blast Off!"
10. "Undone – The Sweater Song"
11. "Endless Bummer"
12. "Susanne" (acoustic version)
13. "Only in Dreams"
14. "The Greatest Man That Ever Lived (Variations on a Shaker Hymn)"
15. "Island in the Sun"
16. "Perfect Situation"
17. "All My Favorite Songs"
18. "Say It Ain't So"
19. "Hash Pipe"
20. "Thank You and Good Night"
21. "Surf Wax America"
22. "Buddy Holly"

== Shows ==
List of concerts, showing date, city, country, venue, and supporting act(s)
Date	City	Country	Venue	Supporting act(s)
June 4, 2023	Huntsville	United States	Orion Amphitheater	Modest Mouse Momma
June 6, 2023	Irving	United States	The Pavilion at the Toyota Music Factory	Modest Mouse Momma
June 8, 2023	Austin	United States	Germania Insurance Amphitheater	Modest Mouse Momma
June 10, 2023	Oklahoma City	United States	Zoo Amphitheater	Modest Mouse Momma
June 11, 2023	Bonner Springs	United States	Azura Amphitheater	Modest Mouse Momma
June 13, 2023	Minneapolis	United States	Minneapolis Armory	Modest Mouse Momma
June 14, 2023	Madison	United States	Breese Stevens Field	Modest Mouse Momma
June 16, 2023	Cuyahoga Falls	United States	Blossom Music Center	Modest Mouse Momma
June 17, 2023	Indianapolis	United States	Garfield Park (Note: This performance was part of the WonderRoad Festival)	N/A
June 18, 2023	Clarkston	United States	Pine Knob Music Theatre	Modest Mouse Momma
June 23, 2023	Columbia	United States	Merriweather Post Pavilion	Future Islands Joyce Manor
June 24, 2023	Charlotte	United States	PNC Music Pavilion	Future Islands Joyce Manor
June 25, 2023	Alpharetta	United States	Ameris Bank Amphitheatre	Future Islands Joyce Manor
June 27, 2023	Philadelphia	United States	TD Pavilion at the Mann	Future Islands Joyce Manor
June 28, 2023	Bridgeport	United States	Hartford HealthCare Amphitheater	Future Islands Joyce Manor
June 30, 2023	Bangor	United States	Maine Savings Amphitheater	Future Islands Joyce Manor
July 1, 2023	Worcester	United States	The Palladium Outdoors	Future Islands Joyce Manor
July 3, 2023	Canadaigua	United States	Constellation Brands – Marvin Sands Performing Arts Center	Future Islands Joyce Manor
July 4, 2023	Toronto	Canada	Budweiser Stage	Future Islands Joyce Manor
July 6, 2023	Quebec City	Canada	Plains of Abraham (Note: This performance was part of the Festival d'été de Québec)	N/A
July 7, 2023	Ottawa	Canada	LeBreton Flats (Note: This performance was part of Ottawa Bluesfest)	N/A
July 9, 2023	Gary	United States	Hard Rock Casino Northern Indiana	Joyce Manor
July 11, 2023	Pittsburgh	United States	Stage AE	Future Islands Joyce Manor
July 13, 2023	New York City (Note: Promoted as Queens in promotional material.)	United States	Forest Hills Stadium	Future Islands Joyce Manor
August 19, 2023	West Vancouver	Canada	Ambleside Park (Note: This performance was part of the Ambleside Music Festival)	N/A
August 20, 2023	Auburn	United States	White River Amphitheatre	Spoon White Reaper
August 22, 2023	Bend	United States	Hayden Homes Amphitheater	Spoon White Reaper
August 24, 2023	Berkeley	United States	Greek Theatre	Spoon White Reaper
August 27, 2023	Magna	United States	The Great Saltair	Spoon White Reaper
August 28, 2023	Greenwood Village	United States	Fiddler's Green Amphitheatre	Spoon White Reaper
August 30, 2023	Phoenix	United States	Arizona Federal Theatre	Spoon White Reaper
September 1, 2023	Paradise (Note: Promoted as Las Vegas in promotional material.)	United States	Zappos Theater	Spoon White Reaper
September 2, 2023	Irvine	United States	FivePoint Amphitheatre	Spoon White Reaper
September 3, 2023	San Diego	United States	Gallagher Square	Spoon White Reaper
