= The Smashing Pumpkins and Weezer UK & Ireland Tour 2024 =

- Tour by The Smashing Pumpkins and Weezer
- Promotional poster for the tour
- Location: Europe
- Associated album: Atum: A Rock Opera in Three Acts (The Smashing Pumpkins)
- Start date: 7 June 2024
- End date: 14 June 2024
- Legs: 1
- No. of shows: 6
- Supporting acts: Teen Mortgage; Tom Morello
Weezer tour chronology
Indie Rock Road Trip (2023)	The Smashing Pumpkins and Weezer UK & Ireland Tour 2024 (2024)	Voyage to the Blue Planet (2024)
The Smashing Pumpkins tour chronology
The World is a Vampire Tour (2023–2024)	The Smashing Pumpkins and Weezer UK & Ireland Tour 2024 (2024)

The Smashing Pumpkins and Weezer UK & Ireland Tour 2024 was a concert tour co-headlined by the American rock bands The Smashing Pumpkins and Weezer. It ran for six shows in Europe, with five in the United Kingdom and one in Ireland. The tour received positive reviews from critics, with many saying that the pairing seemed odd on paper but worked well in person.

== Background and development ==
On 16 October 2023, the American rock bands The Smashing Pumpkins and Weezer jointly announced a concert tour of the British Isles planned for June 2024, with five shows in the United Kingdom and one in Ireland. The two bands had previously both co-headlined the BeachLife Festival in California in 2022. The tour would be The Smashing Pumpkins' first in the United Kingdom since 2019, and according to the online magazine Consequence, the band was using the tour to promote their latest album, Atum: A Rock Opera in Three Acts. In a June 2024 interview with Kerrang!, The Smashing Pumpkins' lead vocalist Billy Corgan discussed the tour and stated that, despite the fact that both bands were popular in the 1990s, the tour would feature a collection of songs from both their older and more recent albums. Tickets for the show were made available via Ticketmaster, See Tickets, and, later, Viagogo.

== Concert synopsis ==
Teen Mortgage served as an opening act for the tour. Additionally, at the Birmingham show, Tom Morello of Rage Against the Machine served as a supporting act.

Weezer performed first, followed by The Smashing Pumpkins. The decoration on the stage for this act consisted only of a representation of the band's logo. In addition to a number of their original songs, the band also played "Celebrity Skin", a song originally performed by Hole, in reference to the fact that Corgan was a co-writer of the song. In total, Weezer's performance lasted about 75 minutes.

The Smashing Pumpkins were the closing act for the tour. The band's lineup consisted of founding members Corgan, Jimmy Chamberlin, and James Iha alongside Katie Cole and new guitarist Kiki Wong. Additionally, Corgan's children accompanied him onstage for part of the band's performance. In total, the band's performance lasted about two hours.

== Critical reception ==
The tour received mostly positive reviews from critics, with many saying that the bands were an odd pairing. For example, journalist Peter Ormerod wrote that the pair were "two bands seemingly at opposite ends of the alt-rock spectrum", while Joe Goggins of the Manchester Evening News described the collaboration as "perhaps a strange one on paper". Reviewers felt that they worked well together, however. Rich Hobson of the website Louder rated the tour 4.5 out of 5 stars, calling it a "Gen-X wet dream", while Danny Kilmartin similarly called the tour a "Gen-X and millennial alternative rock fan's dream" in a positive review for GoldenPlec. The Birmingham Mail, The Irish Times, and the Manchester Evening News all gave the tour 4-star reviews in their coverage of the events. Jonathan Geddes of The Arts Desk gave the tour a rating of 3 out of 5 stars, commenting that "[b]oth 90s favourites went hard and heavy, if occasionally too bludgeoning". However, Ian Gittins of The Guardian was more critical of the tour, giving the Weezer portion a rating of 3 stars and The Smashing Pumpkins portion 2 stars, criticizing the later band's set list as being "uneven" and calling the co-headliners "mismatched 90s rockers".

== Set list ==
The following set list was obtained from the concert held on 8 June 2024 at The O2 Arena in London.

Weezer

1. "My Name Is Jonas"
2. "Beverly Hills"
3. "Dope Nose"
4. "Undone – The Sweater Song"
5. "Pork and Beans"
6. "All My Favorite Songs"
7. "Pink Triangle"
8. "Island in the Sun"
9. "Perfect Situation"
10. "The Good Life"
11. "Celebrity Skin" (Hole cover)
12. "Burndt Jamb"
13. "In the Garage"
14. "Anonymous"
15. "Say It Ain't So"
16. "Run, Raven, Run"
17. "Hash Pipe"
18. "Only in Dreams"
19. "Surf Wax America"
20. "Buddy Holly"

The Smashing Pumpkins

1. "The Everlasting Gaze"
2. "Doomsday Clock"
3. "Zoo Station" (U2 cover)
4. "Today"
5. "Thru the Eyes of Ruby"
6. "Spellbinding"
7. "Tonight, Tonight"
8. "What Which Animates the Spirit"
9. "Ava Adore"
10. "Disarm"
11. "Springtimes"
12. "Mayonaise"
13. "Bullet with Butterfly Wings"
14. "Empires"
15. "Beguiled"
16. "1979"
17. "Birch Grove"
18. "Panopticon"
19. "Shame" (only a snippet)
20. "Jellybelly"
21. "Rhinoceros"
22. "Gossamer"
23. "Cherub Rock"
24. "Zero"

== Tour dates ==
Locations of the shows

List of 2024 concerts
Date (2024)	City	Country	Venue
7 June	Birmingham	England	Utilita Arena Birmingham
8 June	London	England	The O_{2} Arena
10 June	Dublin	Ireland	3Arena
12 June	Glasgow	Scotland	OVO Hydro
13 June	Manchester	England	Co-op Live
14 June	Cardiff	Wales	Cardiff Castle
