= Voyage to the Blue Planet =

2024 concert tour by Weezer

- Tour by Weezer
- Promotional poster for the tour
- Location: Canada; United States
- Associated album: Weezer (Blue Album)
- Start date: September 4, 2024
- End date: October 12, 2024
- Legs: 1
- No. of shows: 24
- Supporting acts: The Flaming Lips; Dinosaur Jr.
- Producer: Live Nation
- Website: Blue Voyage 2024

Weezer concert chronology
- UK & Ireland Tour (with The Smashing Pumpkins) (2024); Voyage to the Blue Planet (2024); European tour (2025)

Voyage to the Blue Planet was a 2024 concert tour by the American rock band Weezer. The band first teased a 30th anniversary tour for their self-titled debut studio album (commonly known as the Blue Album) in December 2023, and officially announced it in March 2024. It took place in North America and consisted of 24 shows, with 22 in the United States and two in Canada. It was produced by Live Nation and was sponsored by Citigroup.

The show featured The Flaming Lips and Dinosaur Jr. as opening acts, and had an outer space aesthetic. Its plot concerned the band traveling to the dying Blue Planet, which is then saved by them playing every track from the 1994 album in order. Songs from other albums, including Pinkerton, the Green Album, and the Red Album, were also played during the tour. The tour received generally positive reviews from critics who praised the show's camp aesthetic and performance from the band. A concert film showcasing the band's performance in Boston was also released.

== Background and development ==
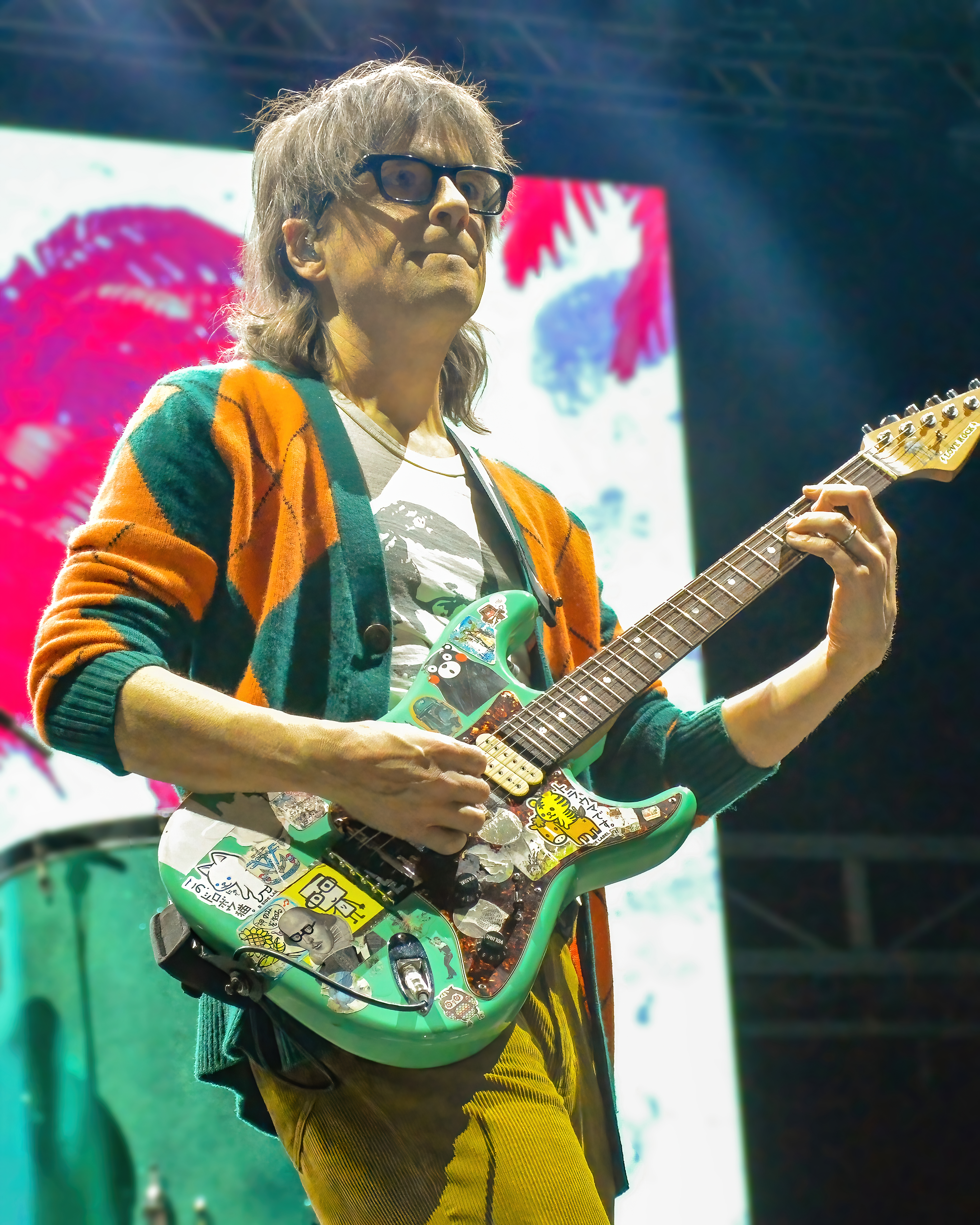
Weezer lead vocalist Rivers Cuomo in 2022

In a December 2023 interview, Steve Weintraub of Collider asked the members of Weezer about plans to commemorate the 30th anniversary of their debut album Weezer (commonly known as the Blue Album), which was first released in May 1994. Rivers Cuomo, the band's lead vocalist, said that, while there had not been a big commemoration for the album's 20th anniversary, the band intended to celebrate the 30th anniversary with "a really amazing deluxe package with a bunch of additional material" and "some kind of epic tour". Cuomo added that their touring schedule was free after June 2024, hinting that an anniversary tour may happen in the following months.

In February 2024, Cuomo made a post on his Facebook account with a link to "BlueVoyage2024.com" along with the caption "Are you prepared for the voyage?" The website asked visitors to sign up for an email mailing list and said, "The voyage takes flight on March 11, 2024". Several news outlets stated that the "Blue Voyage" could be a reference to an anniversary tour for the Blue Album.

On March 11, Live Nation Entertainment announced that presale tickets for the tour, officially called the "Voyage to the Blue Planet", would be available to members of the band's mailing list starting on March 13. The tour was scheduled to begin in Saint Paul, Minnesota, on September 4 and run for 22 shows, concluding in Inglewood, California, on October 11. The tour would be produced by Live Nation and sponsored by Citigroup, with presale tickets also available to Citigroup card holders. General admission tickets would open on March 15, and would be available through Live Nation's sister company Ticketmaster. The rock bands Dinosaur Jr. and The Flaming Lips would serve as opening acts for the tour.

Separate from the tour, Weezer also planned to perform an anniversary concert on March 15 at the Lodge Room in Los Angeles with Dogstar serving as their supporting act. In June 2024, Weezer added another show in Palm Desert, California, on October 12, which would serve as the tour's final show. Additionally, a second show was scheduled for September 15 in Washington, D.C. Following the tour's conclusion, Weezer said that it had been their "best tour ever". The band later played the setlist during the Bumbershoot music festival in Seattle on August 30, 2025.

== Concert synopsis ==
The show began with a breaking news alert announcing a voyage into outer space, before segueing into a countdown. At the end of the countdown, the band appeared on stage, clad in astronaut gear, while a spacecraft lifted up, leaving behind white clouds. Cuomo told the audience that they were embarking on a "very dangerous mission", traveling 30 light years away to save the Blue Planet. Over the course of the show, the band interacts with an alien known as Bokkus, who serves as the main antagonist for the band. (Note: The character Bokkus was originally created by the band in 1992, prior to the release of the Blue Album. Pat Wilson, the band's drummer, created the character's design and drew the character's face on his drumhead, which is visible in a photograph of the band's setup that is included in the inside cover of the Blue Album.)

Throughout the first part of the show, the band played songs from several different albums, such as "Hash Pipe" from the Green Album and "Pork and Beans" from the Red Album. During several of the songs, visual motifs appeared on a large screen behind the band, such as red planets during the Red Album song "Troublemaker" and palm trees during their performance of "Beverly Hills". During "Perfect Situation", the screen on stage showed the band's spacecraft engaged in a fight with Bokkus, who damages the ship. Following this, the band is interrupted by a CGI character on the screen who informed them that they were stranded in the "Pinkerton Asteroid Belt", prompting the band to play several songs from their album Pinkerton, such as "Why Bother?".

About halfway through the show, the band landed on the Blue Planet, which was depicted as a dull and dying planet. Cuomo planted a flag bearing the band's logo and announced, "One small step for Weezer, one giant leap for Weezer-kind". Cuomo also stated that the way to save the planet was to sing the songs from the Blue Album, at which point the band began to play "My Name Is Jonas". During this part of the concert, Bokkus battled with Cuomo and aliens named Weezeroids—resembling Cuomo—appeared on the screen. (Note: In their review of the tour, The Harvard Crimson called the aliens "Weezoids". However, other sources refer to the aliens as "Weezeroids", which is also the name used by the band in the concert film.) Additionally, Cuomo told the audience that both he and the audience themselves were aliens. This announcement was followed by a playing of "Undone – The Sweater Song". Weezer ended the concert with a playing of "Only in Dreams". During the song's crescendo, confetti cannons erupted, after which the band thanked the audience, their opening bands, and their crew before departing the stage. Overall, the show lasted about an hour and a half.

== Critical reception ==
The tour received mostly positive reviews from critics. Evan Minsker of Rolling Stone, in a review of the premier show in Saint Paul, said that the band has "reached new heights as an arena band". He particularly praised the camp approach employed by the band, saying that the show felt like a combination of an Iron Maiden concert and Disneyland's Star Tours attraction. Reviewing the Boston show, Chris Stevens of Boston.com said he agreed with The Flaming Lips' lead vocalist Wayne Coyne in calling the show "effing mind blowing", further stating that the show was "all camp, all fun". Reviewing the same performance, Aiden J. Bowers of The Harvard Crimson praised the band's performance, saying they were "at their best", and said that the last moments of the show "brought out some of Weezer's best musical work". In a positive review of the Nashville show, Audrey Gibbs of The Tennessean praised Cuomo's performance.

Ethan Shanfeld of Variety gave an overall positive review of the tour, but criticized certain aspects. This included the aesthetics, saying that at one point the show resembled a performance by The Wiggles, and song selection, criticizing the inclusion of a song from Pacific Daydream but none from the White Album. James Sullivan of The Boston Globe gave a mixed review where he also criticized the aesthetics, saying that by the time the band began its performance of songs from the Blue Album, "the kitschy video-game backdrop had worn a little thin".

== Broadcasts and recordings ==
A concert film was recorded of Weezer's performance on September 10 at the TD Garden in Boston. It was livestreamed on Moment.co on October 13 and 14. Additionally, The Flaming Lips recorded their September 4 performance at the Xcel Energy Center in Saint Paul, Minnesota.

== Set list ==
The following set list was obtained from the concert held on September 10, 2024, at the TD Garden in Boston.

1. "Anonymous"
2. "Return to Ithaka"
3. "Dope Nose"
4. "Hash Pipe"
5. "Pork and Beans"
6. "Beverly Hills"
7. "Burndt Jamb"
8. "Island in the Sun"
9. "Any Friend of Diane's"
10. "Perfect Situation"
11. "Run, Raven, Run"
12. "Getchoo"
13. "Why Bother?"
14. "Pink Triangle"
15. "You Gave Your Love to Me Softly"
16. "Across the Sea"
17. "My Name Is Jonas"
18. "No One Else"
19. "The World Has Turned and Left Me Here"
20. "Buddy Holly"
21. "Undone – The Sweater Song"
22. "Surf Wax America"
23. "Say It Ain't So"
24. "In the Garage"
25. "Holiday"
26. "Only in Dreams"

== Shows ==
List of concerts, showing date, city, country, and venue
Date	City	Country	Venue
September 4, 2024	Saint Paul, Minnesota	United States	Xcel Energy Center
September 6, 2024	Rosemont, Illinois	United States	Allstate Arena
September 7, 2024	Columbus, Ohio	United States	Nationwide Arena
September 8, 2024	Toronto, Ontario	Canada	Scotiabank Arena
September 10, 2024	Boston, Massachusetts	United States	TD Garden
September 11, 2024	New York City, New York	United States	Madison Square Garden
September 13, 2024	Philadelphia, Pennsylvania	United States	Wells Fargo Center
September 14, 2024	Washington, D.C.	United States	The Anthem
September 15, 2024	Washington, D.C.	United States	The Anthem
September 17, 2024	Nashville, Tennessee	United States	Bridgestone Arena
September 18, 2024	Greenville, South Carolina	United States	Bon Secours Wellness Arena
September 20, 2024	Orlando, Florida	United States	Kia Center
September 21, 2024	Hollywood, Florida	United States	Hard Rock Live
September 27, 2024	Austin, Texas	United States	Moody Center
September 28, 2024	Houston, Texas	United States	Toyota Center
September 29, 2024	Dallas, Texas	United States	American Airlines Center
October 1, 2024	Loveland, Colorado	United States	Blue Arena
October 4, 2024	Seattle, Washington	United States	Climate Pledge Arena
October 5, 2024	Vancouver, British Columbia	Canada	Rogers Arena
October 6, 2024	Portland, Oregon	United States	Moda Center
October 8, 2024	Sacramento, California	United States	Golden 1 Center
October 9, 2024	San Francisco, California	United States	Chase Center
October 11, 2024	Inglewood, California	United States	Intuit Dome
October 12, 2024	Palm Desert, California	United States	Acrisure Arena
