= The Kitchen Tape =

- Cover of the Opposite Sides of the Same Good Ol' Fence release from the Weezer 30th Anniversary box set

Demo album by Weezer
- Released: September 1992; November 1, 2024
- Recorded: August 1, 1992
- Studios: Amherst House, Los Angeles
- Genres: Alternative rock; power pop; indie rock; emo
- Length: 35:45
- Producer: Weezer

Weezer chronology
The Kitchen Tape (1992)	Weezer (1994)

The Kitchen Tape (commonly known as Opposite Sides of the Same Good Ol' Fence) is a demo tape by the American rock band Weezer. It was recorded on August 1, 1992, prior to the band's signing with Geffen Records. Frontman Rivers Cuomo personally made 15 to 20 copies of the demo. One copy, under the title Opposite Sides of the Same Good Ol' Fence, was given to engineer Paul DuGres with a slightly different track listing, which was officially released on the 30th anniversary box set of Weezer (Blue Album) in 2024.

== Overview ==
=== Recording ===
The Kitchen Tape was recorded using frontman Rivers Cuomo's 8-track tape recorder in a rented garage next to the "Amherst House", where Weezer often rehearsed. The name of the tape comes from the fact that the drums were recorded in a kitchen, where the band members felt that they sounded the best.

Band historian Karl Koch has recalled that the demo was recorded "to get shows and also try to make an impression", and that "[there] were no aspirations yet to try to generate real label interest, but the concept of 'creating a buzz' was being thrown around."

=== Release ===
Up until 2024, The Kitchen Tape had not received an official release beyond the original small run of privately distributed demo cassettes. However, it had been bootlegged and spread online. Additionally, the recordings of the songs "Undone – The Sweater Song", "Paperface", and "Only in Dreams" from the demo appear on the 2004 deluxe version of Weezer. The recording of "My Name Is Jonas" was officially released on YouTube by the band in 2024. The full demo tape was released as part of the Weezer 30th anniversary box set the same year, using the Opposite Sides title and track listing as well as a brand new cover.

== Track listing ==
All tracks are written by Rivers Cuomo, except where noted.

No.	Title	Writer(s)	Length
1.	"Thief, You've Taken All That Was Me"	Cuomo; Patrick Wilson	3:40
2.	"My Name Is Jonas^{[I]}"	Cuomo; Wilson; Jason Cropper	3:18
3.	"Let's Sew Our Pants Together"		4:32
4.	"Undone^{[I]}^{[II]}"		5:39
5.	"Paperface"^{[II]}"		3:06
6.	"Say It Ain't So^{[I]}"		4:22
7.	"Only in Dreams^{[I]}^{[II]}"		5:59
8.	"The World Has Turned and Left Me Here^{[I]}"	Cuomo; Wilson	5:09
Total length:			35:45

I. Later re-recorded for the band's debut album.
II. Demo released on the deluxe edition of the band's debut album

== Personnel ==
- Rivers Cuomo – vocals, guitar
- Matt Sharp – bass, vocals
- Jason Cropper – guitar, vocals
- Patrick Wilson – drums
