= You Blue It =

EP by You Blew It!
- Released: July 15, 2014
- Recorded: The Vanguard Room in Lakeland, Florida
- Genres: Emo, indie rock, pop punk
- Label: Topshelf
- Producer: Matt Wilbur

You Blew It! chronology
Keep Doing What You're Doing (2014)	You Blue It (2014)	Abendrot (2016)

You Blue It is a cover EP by American emo band, You Blew It!. The title is a pun on the Blue Album by Weezer (which contains the tracks the band covers) and the band's own name. It was released through Topshelf Records on July 15, 2014.

== Track listing ==
No.	Title	Writer(s)	Length
1.	"In The Garage"	Rivers Cuomo	3:55
2.	"My Name Is Jonas"	Cuomo, Patrick Wilson, Jason Cropper	3:29
3.	"Only in Dreams"	Cuomo	5:23
4.	"Surf Wax America"	Cuomo, Wilson	3:10
5.	"Susanne"	Cuomo	2:46
Total length:			18:42

== Chart positions ==
Chart (2014)	Peak position
US Vinyl Albums (Billboard)	13
