= Rock Music: A Tribute to Weezer =

Compilation album by Various Artists
- Released: January 22, 2002
- Label: Dead Droid Records

Professional ratings
Review scores
Source	Rating
Allmusic	link

Rock Music: A Tribute to Weezer is a 2002 Weezer tribute album released by Dead Droid Records.

== Track listing ==
All tracks are written by Rivers Cuomo, with additional writers noted.

No.	Title	Writer(s)	Performed by	Length
1.	"My Name Is Jonas"	Patrick Wilson; Jason Cropper	Affinity	4:38
2.	"No One Else"		Piebald	3:03
3.	"Holiday"		Glasseater	3:15
4.	"Surf Wax America"	Wilson	Grade	2:45
5.	"Say It Ain't So"		Further Seems Forever	4:10
6.	"The World Has Turned and Left Me Here"	Wilson	Elliott	6:12
7.	"Susanne"		Midtown	2:23
8.	"Jamie"		Dashboard Confessional	4:09
9.	"El Scorcho"		The Stereo	4:19
10.	"Tired of Sex"		Mycomplex	2:52
11.	"The Good Life"		The Impossibles	3:55
12.	"Only in Dreams"		Mock Orange	4:39
13.	"Butterfly"		The Ataris	2:46

The vinyl version contains two versions of "Say it Ain't So", covered by Further Seems Forever. One with the band's original vocalist Chris Carrabba. However, the vinyl sleeve also contains a misprint noting that the version of "Say It Ain't So" sung by Chris Carrabba is track 14, when in fact it is track 5.
