= Susanne (Weezer song) =

1994 song by Weezer

Song by Weezer

from the album Mallrats (soundtrack)
- A-side: "Undone – The Sweater Song"
- Released: June 24, 1994
- Length: 2:47
- Label: DGC Records
- Songwriter: Rivers Cuomo

"Susanne" (also spelled "Suzanne") is a 1994 song by Weezer first released as the B-side of the single, "Undone – The Sweater Song". A remix of "Suzanne" was used on the 1995 Mallrats soundtrack. The song was later included on the 2004 deluxe re-release of the Blue Album.

== Reception ==
The song medaled in a 2016 Rolling Stone readers' poll of Weezer's best deep cuts. "Susanne" has been described as "a devotional song, albeit an anthemic, fist-pumping one...but on the other hand, the chick he's valorizing seems almost too perfect, like the idealized version of a girlfriend of a chronic sad sack—the sort of narcissistic dick who's forever auditioning mommy surrogates. 'Susanne' is almost entirely about what Susanne has done, and can do, for the narrator: feeding him, clothing him, brightening his day, blowing off Guns N' Roses to tend to his needs. When Cuomo howls 'I'm your child, make me blush, drive me wild' on the chorus, the jig is up, but the heretofore established intense sincerity carries the listener through the facade, somehow." The song was written inspired by a "Geffen A&R assistant and huge fan of the band who became their biggest advocate in the early portion of their career."

== In media ==
The song was used in "Bears", a 2025 episode of The Bear TV series.

The song is played at the end of the film Mallrats, while a montage of characters plays and Jay and Silent Bob walk with an orangutan named Susanne.
