= Dikembe (band) =

American rock band

- Origin: Gainesville, Florida
- Genres: Emo, punk rock, indie rock
- Years active: 2010–present
- Label: Skeletal Lightning
- Members: Steven Gray; David Bell; Randy Reddell; Scott Carr; Jon Cody Garwacke
- Past members: Ryan Willems; Andy Anaya; Kenny Jewett; Mike Jones; Max Stern; Evan Weiss; Christian Holden; Nick Nottebaum; Ross Papitto
- Website: dikembedudes.com

Dikembe is an American rock band from Gainesville, Florida.

== History ==
Dikembe formed in December 2010. In 2011, the band embarked on a winter tour with You Blew It!. In 2012, they signed to Tiny Engines and released their debut studio album titled Broad Shoulders. Kenny Jewett left the band in 2013 and was replaced with Randy Reddell. The band went on a summer tour in 2013 with Signals Midwest. They released their second studio album in 2014, titled Mediumship. They released their third studio album, Hail Something, as a 3-piece on their newly formed Death Protector Collective label. In October 2017 Andy Anaya of You Blew It! joined Dikembe on guitar. In 2020 they signed to Skeletal Lightning and released their 4th LP, Muck, their first with guitarist Andy Anaya.

== Band members ==
=== Current members ===
- David Bell - drums (2010–present)
- Steven Gray - guitar/vocals (2010–present)
- Randy Reddell - bass (2013–present)
- Andy Anaya - guitar (2017–present)
- Scott Carr - guitar (2022–present)
- Jon Cody Garwacke - guitar (2025-present)

=== Past members ===
- Ryan Willems - guitar (2010–2016)
- Kenny Jewett - bass (2011–2013)
- Mike Jones - guitar (2015)
- Nick Nottebaum - bass (2018)
- Ross Papitto - bass (2014)
- Max Stern - guitar (2015) Fest 14 only
- Evan Weiss (Into It. Over It.)- vocals (2015) Fest 14 only
- Christian Holden (The Hotelier)- vocals (2015) Fest 14 only

== Discography ==
Studio albums

- Broad Shoulders (2012)
- Mediumship (2014)
- Hail Something (2016)
- Muck (2020)

EPs

- Chicago Bowls (2011)
- Ledge (2015)
- Game Over (2021)
- King (2026)

Live Albums

- Live at Loosey's (2016)

Splits

- Dikembe / You Blew It! - Fulfill the Prophecy (2011)
- Dikembe / Hightide Hotel / Jet Set Sail / Monument (2013)
- Dikembe / The Hotelier / Modern Baseball / Old Gray / Empire! Empire! (I Was a Lonely Estate) / Pentimento - Fest 12"
- Pet Symmetry / Dikembe (2013)
- Dikembe / Jazz June (2014)
- Dikembe / Prince Daddy & The Hyena / Expert Timing / Henrietta - DPC Mixtape #1 (2017)
