= Keep Doing What You're Doing =

Studio album by You Blew It!
- Released: 14 January 2014
- Recorded: Atlas, Chicago, Illinois
- Genre: Emo, indie rock, pop punk
- Length: 34:04
- Label: Topshelf Records
- Producer: Evan Weiss

You Blew It! chronology
Florida Doesn't Suck (2013)	Keep Doing What You're Doing (2014)	You Blue It (2014)

Keep Doing What You're Doing is the second studio album by Floridian emo band, You Blew It! The album was released through Topshelf Records on January 14, 2014. It was the band's first album to chart, charting on the Billboard 200, Independent Albums and Top Heatseekers. In April and May, the group supported The Early November on their tour of the UK and Europe. In September and October, the band supported Citizen on their headlining US tour. In October and November 2015, the group supported The Wonder Years on their headlining US tour.

== Critical reception ==
Professional ratings
Review scores
Source	Rating
AbsolutePunk	8.5/10
AllMusic	Favorable
Alternative Press	4/5 stars
Pitchfork	7.6/10
PopMatters	7/10 stars
Punknews.org	4/5 stars

Keep Doing What You're Doing has received positive reviews from music critics.

== Track listing ==
No.	Title	Length
1.	"Match & Tinder"	2:40
2.	"Award of the Year Award"	2:42
3.	"Strong Island"	3:52
4.	"Regional Dialect"	3:42
5.	"House Address"	3:37
6.	"A Different Kind of Kindling"	4:30
7.	"Rock Springs"	2:50
8.	"You & Me & Me"	3:13
9.	"Grey Matter"	3:32
10.	"Better to Best"	3:26

== Chart positions ==
Chart (2014)	Peak position
US Billboard 200	198
US Heatseekers Albums (Billboard)	2
US Independent Albums (Billboard)	33

== Accolades ==
Publication	Country	Accolade	Year	Rank
Stereogum	US	The 50 Best Albums of 2014	2014	45
