= Chopper One (band) =

- Origin: Los Angeles, California, USA
- Genres: Alternative rock, power pop
- Years active: 1995-1999
- Label: Restless Records

Chopper One were an American alternative rock band from Los Angeles, California. They were active between 1995 and 1999, releasing their sole full-length album Now Playing in 1997.

== History ==
The band was formed in 1995 by former Weezer guitarist Jason Cropper with his then-wife Amy Cropper, along with drummer Tyrone Rio.

After releasing an indie single titled "Free Lunch", the band signed to Warner subsidiary Restless Records, who released their debut Now Playing on June 17, 1997. It was reissued in 1998 under the title Chopper One, with the band breaking up the following year.

== Musical style ==
Chopper One's sound was compared to Cropper's ex-band Weezer. In a 1997 interview with MTV, he stated, "I can live with people saying it sounds a little like Weezer. I was in Weezer from the beginning, and even before that, in the pre-Weezer bands. A lot of what is on that first Weezer album was me."

== Members ==
- Jason Cropper - Vocals, guitar (1995 - 1999)
- Amy Cropper - Bass, vocals (1995 - 1999)
- Tyrone Rio - Drums (1995 - 1997)
- Troy Zeigler - Drums (1998 - 1999)
- Dallan Baumgarten - Guitar (1998 - 1999)

== Discography ==
=== Albums ===
- Now Playing (1997)

=== Singles ===
- "Free Lunch" (1995)
- "Touch My Fuzz" (1997)
- "Hescher with a Gym Bag" (1997)
- "A Punk Named Josh" (1998) AUS #96

=== Music videos ===
- "Touch My Fuzz" (1997)
- ”A Punk Named Josh” (1998)
