= Florida Doesn't Suck =

EP by Fake Problems and You Blew It!
- Released: February 12, 2013
- Recorded: Parkshore Studios in Naples, Florida
- Genre: Indie rock, emo, pop punk, math rock
- Label: Topshelf

Fake Problems chronology
Sugar (2013)	Florida Doesn't Suck (2013)

You Blew It! chronology
Grow Up, Dude (2012)	Florida Doesn't Suck (2013)	Keep Doing What You're Doing (2014)

Florida Doesn't Suck is a split extended play by Floridian indie outfits, Fake Problems and You Blew It!.

== Critical reception ==
Professional ratings
Review scores
Source	Rating
Punknews.org	3.5/5 stars

The extended play was released before either band received much mainstream attention, so there are very few professional reviews on the EP. Tori Pope of Punknews.org gave the extended play three-and-half stars out of five. Pope praised Fake Problems for the reinvention of their sound, stating "their two songs here represent yet another step in their constant evolution." Pope was more critical of You Blew It!'s half of the EP, claiming that their song Batavia, NY is "a drowsy slow-burning song that builds to a climax that never come".

== Track listing ==
Fake Problems
No.	Title	Length
1.	"Small Devil Song"	2:49
2.	"Gone Before Dawn"	4:14

You Blew It!
No.	Title	Length
3.	"Batavia, NY"	3:34
4.	"I'm A Kid, That's My Job"	2:21
