= Grow Up, Dude =

Studio album by You Blew It!
- Released: 24 April 2012
- Genre: Emo, indie rock, math rock
- Length: 34:00
- Label: Topshelf Records
- Producer: Derek Perry

You Blew It! chronology
The Past In Present (2010)	Grow Up, Dude (2012)	Florida Doesn't Suck (2013)

Grow Up, Dude is the debut studio album by Floridian emo band, You Blew It! The album was released through Topshelf Records on April 24, 2012. Released through Topshelf, it was the band's second release on Topshelf, and their first LP through Topshelf. In June and July 2013, the group went on a short US tour with Mixtapes, Modern Baseball and Light Years.

== Critical reception ==
Professional ratings
Review scores
Source	Rating
AbsolutePunk	8.5/10
Alternative Press	3.5/5 stars
Punknews.org	3.5/5 stars
Sanctuary Review	9/10 stars
Sputnikmusic	4/5 stars

Grow Up, Dude has received mostly positive reviews from music critics. Brandon Wall-Fudge of the Sanctuary Review gave a rave review of the album stating that the band "does do the quieter side with great poise, the band really show off some great talent in the more energetic cuts". Drew Beringer of AbsolutePunk praised the album for a nostalgic, but original vibe that the albums gives. Beringer stated that "what makes You Blew It! so endearing is just how real they are. There's nothing fake or insincere with them or this record, as it contains that DIY charm. The raw imperfection – the rough guitar chords, the casual off note – gives the record's twelve tracks a devil-may-care attitude that is at once relatable."

Despite the acclaim, Jason Schreurs of Alternative Press gave the album a more mixed review, stating that the album might have the charm mainly due to its low-budget, do-it-yourself attitude. Schreurs believes that "if (Grow Up, Dude) was polished with big production, it wouldn't be nearly as endearing." Schreurs ended up giving the album three-and-a-half stars out of five.

== Track listing ==
No.	Title	Length
1.	"Grow Up, Dude"	0:51
2.	"Pinball House"	2:39
3.	"The One with David"	3:19
4.	"Terry v. Tori"	3:25
5.	"Medal of Honor"	2:53
6.	"The One with Marc"	3:14
7.	"I Am, I'm Trying"	2:33
8.	"The Fifties"	2:18
9.	"Good for Bond, Bad for You"	3:38
10.	"I'm Bill Paxton"	3:13
11.	"A Noble Black Eye"	2:56
12.	"There's Nothing I Love More Than Baseball"	3:01

== Personnel ==
You Blew It!

- Andy Anaya
- Timothy Flynn
- Nicholas Inman
- Tanner Jones

Additional musicians

- Steven Gray – guest vocals
- Derek Perry – vocal harmony
- Sean Stevenson – keyboards
