= Abendrot (album) =

Studio album by You Blew It!
- Released: November 11, 2016
- Genre: Indie rock
- Length: 36:28
- Label: Triple Crown
- Producer: Evan Weiss, Matt Jordan, Adam beck

You Blew It! chronology
You Blue It (2014)	Abendrot (2016)

Singles from Abendrot
- 1. "Autotheology" Released: September 21, 2016; 2. "Greenwood" Released: October 27, 2016

Professional ratings
Aggregate scores
Source	Rating
Metacritic	80/100
Review scores
Source	Rating
The A.V. Club	B
Pitchfork	7.2/10
Punknews.org	4.5/5 stars
Sputnikmusic	1.5/5

Abendrot is the third and final studio album by American emo band, You Blew It! The album was released through Triple Crown Records on November 11, 2016. It was announced on September 21, 2016. The first single, "Autotheology" was released the same day. In November 16 of the same year the band announced a 2017 US tour in support of the album with All Get Out and Free Throw as their opening acts. The music video for the song "Arrowhead" was released on February 16, 2017 and was directed by Foxing's Josh Coll.

== Track listing ==
No.	Title	Length
1.	"Epaulette"	1:58
2.	"Like Myself"	3:01
3.	"Sundial Song"	2:54
4.	"Greenwood"	3:38
5.	"Autotheology"	2:49
6.	"Hue"	2:49
7.	"Canary"	2:39
8.	"Forecasting"	3:45
9.	"Minorwye"	2:44
10.	"Arrowhead"	4:38
11.	"Basin & Range"	3:23
12.	"Kerning"	2:10
Total length:		36:28

== Personnel ==
Adapted from the Bandcamp page.

- Tanner Jones – vocals, guitar
- Trevor O’Hare – guitar, vocals
- Andrew Anaya – guitar
- Andrew Vila – bass
- Matthew Nissley – drums
- Evan Weiss – synths, piano, organ, vibraphone, other auxiliary instrumentation, select vocal harmonies on "Basin & Range"
- Matt Jordan – auxiliary percussion, engineering wonders
- Adam Beck – auxiliary percussion, assistant engineering wonders

== Charts ==
Chart	Peak position
Billboard Heatseekers Albums	10
Billboard Independent Albums	49
