= You Blew It! =

American emo quintet based in Orlando, Florida

- Origin: Orlando, Florida
- Genres: Emo revival; math rock; pop punk; indie rock
- Years active: 2009–2017; Reunions (2018/2022/2023)
- Labels: Topshelf, Jade Tree, Triple Crown, Big Scary Monsters
- Members: Tanner Jones; Andy Anaya; Trevor O'Hare; Matt Nissley; Andy Vila
- Past members: Timothy Flynn; Matt Messore; Marc Ispass; David Fuentes; Nick Inman
- Website: youblewit.bandcamp.com

You Blew It! was an American emo quintet based in Orlando, Florida. The band was formed in 2009 by Tanner Jones, Timothy Flynn, and Matt Messore.

== History ==
In 2012, the band released their debut LP, Grow Up, Dude under Topshelf Records. Prior to their LP, the band released two EPs: EP in 2009 and The Past in the Present in 2010.

Following Grow Up, Dude the band released a split EP in 2013 entitled Florida Doesn't Suck with fellow Floridian band Fake Problems. Their 2014 LP, Keep Doing What You're Doing, achieved the most commercial success of any of their albums, charting in the Billboard 200, the Billboard Top Heatseekers and the Independent Albums charts. Later that same year, the band released a cover EP, entitled You Blue It, which features covers from Weezer's 1994 album, The Blue Album. The most recent work by the band was a twelve-track LP entitled Abendrot which came out on November 11, 2016.

On October 9, 2017, the band announced their final two shows "for the foreseeable future." The band briefly reunited in August 2018 to play three shows in Florida with the emo band American Football, stating that "passing on the opportunity to play with them would forever rest in the back of our minds," via their Instagram.

The band was inactive from 2018 until early 2022. In September 2021, Tanner Jones formed a band called Couplet with members of Into It. Over It. & Sincere Engineer. The debut album, Lp1, was released on October 1, 2021. On April 25, 2022, the band released four previously unreleased demo tracks from the Grow Up, Dude sessions.

On July 22, 2022, while Anaya's band Pool Kids was supporting Jones' band Couplet, the duo performed an impromptu acoustic You Blew It! set.

On February 11, 2023, the band announced they would be reuniting with the original lineup to perform a one-off reunion show on May 12 performing the band's material from 2009-2012 at Nice Guy's Pizza. Two more shows were added due to overwhelming demand.

== Members ==
- Timothy Flynn, drums (2009–2013, 2023)
- Tanner Jones, vocals/guitar (2009–2018, 2022–2024)
- Matt Messore, vocals/guitar (2009–2010)
- Trevor O'Hare, guitar/backing vocals (2010–2018, 2023)
- Andrew Anaya, guitar/backing vocals (2011–2018, 2022, 2024)
- David Fuentes, bass (2011–2012, 2023, 2024)
- Nick Inman, bass (2012–2013)
- Mark Ispass, bass (2010–2011)
- Matthew Nissley, drums (2013–2018)
- Andrew Vila, bass (2013–2018)
- Steven Gray, bass (2011)
- Randy Reddell, bass (2008)

== Discography ==
=== Studio albums ===
Title	Album details	Peak chart positions		
Title	Album details	US	US Heat	US Indie
Grow Up, Dude	Release: April 24, 2012; Label: Topshelf; Format: CD, DL, LP	—	—	—
Keep Doing What You're Doing	Release: January 14, 2014; Label: Topshelf; Format: CD, DL, LP	198	2	33
Abendrot	Release: November 11, 2016; Label: Triple Crown; Format: CD, DL, LP	—	10	49

=== Extended plays ===
Title	Album details
EP	Release: April 1, 2009; Label: Self-released; Format: CD, DL
The Past in Present	Release: August 3, 2010; Label: Good Friends; Format: CD, DL
Florida Doesn't Suck (split EP with Fake Problems)	Release: February 13, 2013; Label: Topshelf; Format: DL, 7" vinyl
You Blue It	Release: July 15, 2014; Label: Topshelf; Format: DL, 7" vinyl
Pioneer of Nothing	Release: January 27, 2015; Label: Jade Tree; Format: DL, 7" vinyl
Pulse	Release: June 12, 2016; Label: Self-released; Format: DL
