= Teen Mortgage =

American punk rock band

- Origin: Washington, D.C., United States
- Genres: Punk rock; garage rock
- Years active: 2017–present
- Labels: King Pizza Records; Roadrunner
- Members: James Guile; Ed Barkauskas
- Website: www.teenmortgageband.com

Teen Mortgage is an American punk rock duo from Washington, D.C.. The group consists of guitarist/vocalist James Guile and drummer Ed Barkauskas.

== History ==
Teen Mortgage formed in early 2017 after Guile moved from the United Kingdom to Maryland and placed an ad on Craigslist seeking a drummer. The pair booked their first show after playing together for about a month.

Before forming the duo, Guile had led earlier versions of the project while living in Liverpool, England, and had opened for touring acts such as Plague Vendor and Chastity. Barkauskas, who had previously studied at Georgetown University, met Guile after responding to his Craigslist ad. Their first performance as Teen Mortgage took place in January 2017 at the Washington, D.C. venue DC9, supporting Acid Dad and Ian Sweet.

The band's name was inspired by an art piece titled Pocket Money Loans that appeared in Banksy's Dismaland installation. Guile explained that the piece satirized predatory lending aimed at "uneducated people and children".

In a 2025 interview, the band said they initially sounded "like straight garage rock and indie rock" before gradually developing a heavier, stoner-metal-influenced sound.

The band released early material through King Pizza Records, and their music later appeared in placements for Vans and the television series Shameless. They were briefly targeted in an online Pizzagate conspiracy due to playing a show at Comet Ping Pong and releasing an EP on King Pizza Records.

In May 2017, Teen Mortgage released their debut four-track EP through Wiener Records, a cassette imprint associated with Burger Records.

The duo continued developing their sound across the Washington D.C.–Maryland–Virginia area while balancing non-music work, with Guile employed in retail and Barkauskas working as a nurse and frontline ER employee. They released two further EPs, LIFE / DEATH in 2019 and SMOKED in 2021.

Teen Mortgage signed with Roadrunner Records in 2024 and released their debut album, Devil Ultrasonic Dream, the following year. The band have toured with acts such as Weezer, the Smashing Pumpkins, and Alkaline Trio, and performed at the 2025 edition of Download Festival.

== Discography ==
=== EPs ===
- Untitled debut EP (2017, Wiener Records)
- LIFE / DEATH (2019)
- SMOKED (2021)

=== Albums ===
- Devil Ultrasonic Dream (2025)
