= Buddy Holly (song) =

1994 single by Weezer

Single by Weezer

from the album Weezer (The Blue Album)
- B-side: "Jamie"
- Released: September 7, 1994
- Studio: Electric Lady (New York City)
- Genre: Alternative rock; power pop; pop rock; pop-punk
- Length: 2:39
- Label: DGC
- Songwriter: Rivers Cuomo
- Producer: Ric Ocasek

Weezer singles chronology
"Undone – The Sweater Song" (1994)	"Buddy Holly" (1994)	"Say It Ain't So" (1995)

Music video
- "Buddy Holly" on YouTube

Audio sample
- file; help

"Buddy Holly" is a song by the American rock band Weezer. It was written by Rivers Cuomo and released by DGC Records as the second single from the Weezer debut album, Weezer (The Blue Album) (1994). The lyrics reference the 1950s rock-and-roll singer of the same name and the actress Mary Tyler Moore.

Released on September 7, 1994—which would have been Holly's 58th birthday—"Buddy Holly" ranked number two on the US Billboard Modern Rock Tracks chart and number 18 on the Billboard Hot 100 Airplay chart. It reached number six in Canada, number 12 in the United Kingdom (upon release in 1995), number 13 in Iceland, and number 14 in Sweden.

The music video, which features footage from Happy Days and was directed by Spike Jonze, earned considerable exposure when it was included as a bonus media file in Microsoft's initial successful release of the operating system Windows 95.

Rolling Stone ranked "Buddy Holly" number 484 on its list of "The 500 Greatest Songs of All Time" (2021), raising it 15 spots from number 499 (2010), and raised from around 19 years prior, being ranked number 497 (2004). The digital single was certified four-times platinum by the Recording Industry Association of America in 2026. VH1 ranked it the 59th greatest song of the 1990s in December 2007.

== Background and writing ==
Rivers Cuomo was inspired to write "Buddy Holly" after an incident where his Weezer bandmates made fun of his friend from the Santa Monica College Choir. He originally planned to exclude it from the album; he felt it was "cheesy" and perhaps did not represent the sound he was pursuing for Weezer. Producer Ric Ocasek persuaded him to include it. In the book River's Edge, Ocasek is quoted saying: "I remember at one point he was hesitant to do 'Buddy Holly' and I was like, 'Rivers, we can talk about it. Do it anyway, and if you don't like it when it's done, we won't use it. But I think you should try. You did write it and it is a great song.'" Bassist Matt Sharp recalled: "Ric said we'd be stupid to leave it off the album. We'd come into the studio in the morning and find little pieces of paper with doodles on them: WE WANT BUDDY HOLLY."

The song is well known for the distinctive, high-pitched guitar lick at the end of the guitar solo (around 2:09 in the song), which has been used as a bait-and-switch prank in a similar way to Rickrolling. This phenomenon is widely known across the internet as "Weezer rolling" or simply getting "Weezer'd".

Coincidentally, the theme song for The Mary Tyler Moore Show was written by Sonny Curtis, who played with Buddy Holly in Texas and later performed as one of The Crickets.

== Critical reception ==
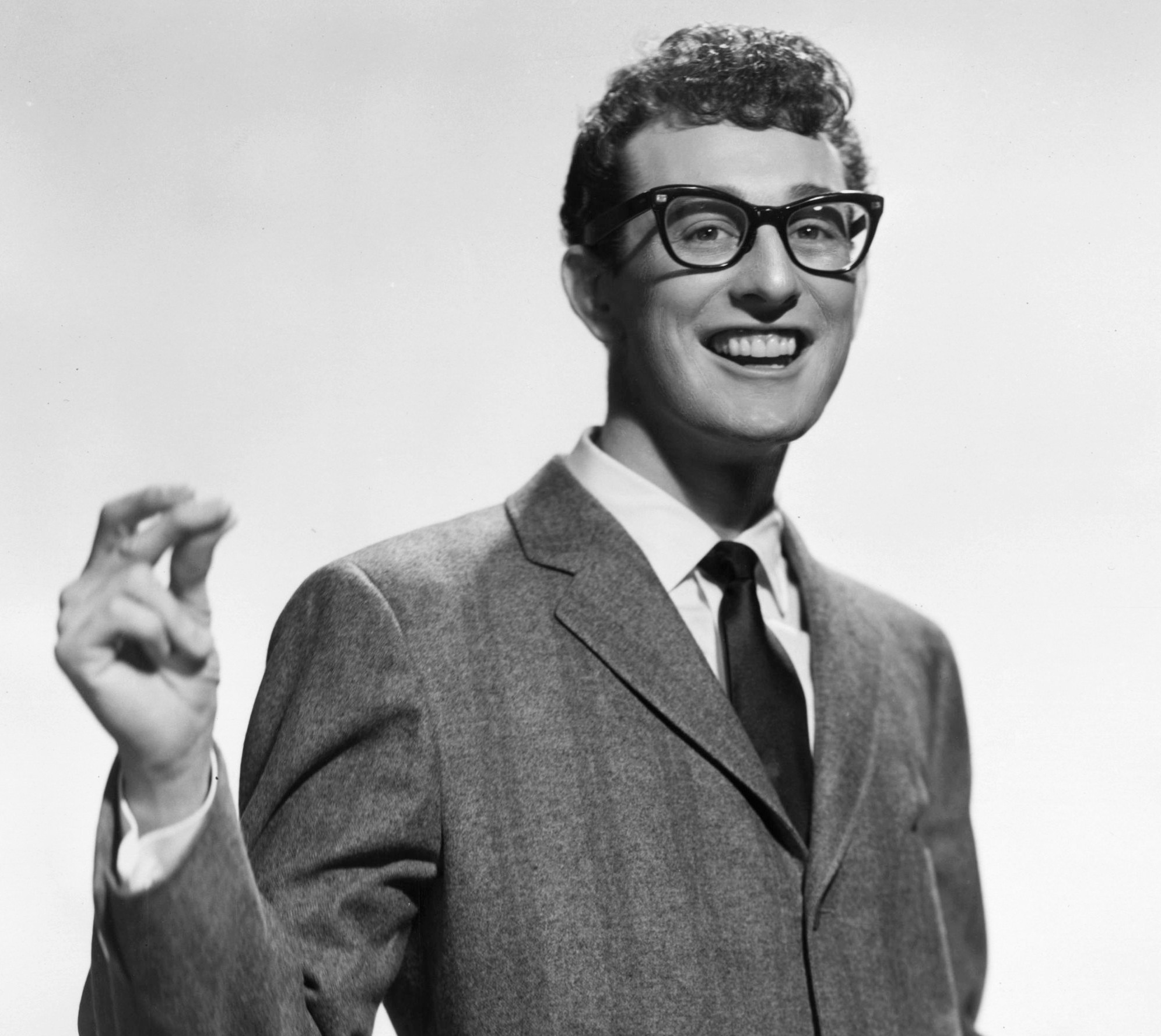
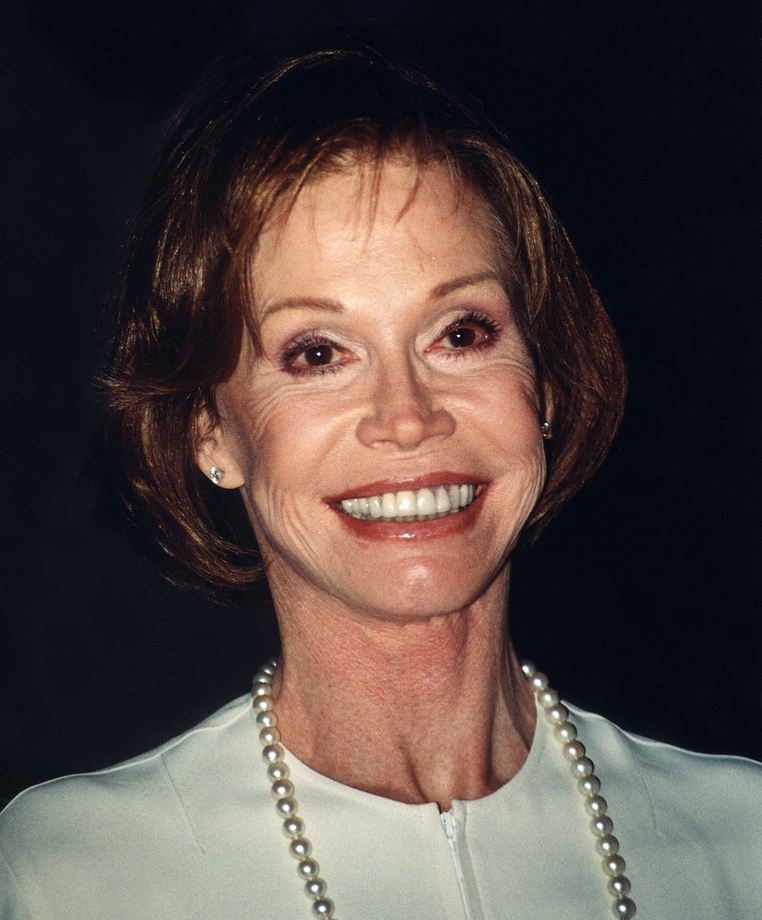
The song was released on what would have been its namesake's (left) 58th birthday. The song also references American actress Mary Tyler Moore (right).

Steve Baltin from Cash Box commented, "You’ve gotta love a song that makes reference to Mary Tyler Moore. Slightly poppier in its guitar sound than their first single, [...], this Ric Ocasek-produced song could help expand their already-growing fan base. Besides that, it mentions Mary, the woman who could turn the world on with her smile. Therefore, it has to be a hit." John Robb from Melody Maker opined, "Weezer sound like The Proclaimers jamming with The Knack. This is pop-punk-by-numbers." Pan-European magazine Music & Media wrote, "Made loud to play loud and sing along, it's the ideal power pop to cruise round this summer. That silly twin synth/guitar, betrays producer Ocasek, the one-time driver of New York's Cars." A reviewer from Music Week gave the song four out of five, adding, "A short and sweet taster from the album which may not have the same quirky appeal of "Undone – The Sweater Song", but has an attractive hook and a video to arouse interest."

Johnny Cigarettes from NME commented, "A touching paean to nerdish social rejection from people who frankly deserve it. [...] But I am totally suckered by the pop majesty of a song that employs the long forgotten phrase Oo-ee-oo and drills an indelible mark on your taste buds such that you can never forget it's [sic] supernaturally banal chorus." NME ranked it number five in their list of the Top 20 of 1995 in December 1995, writing, "Wahey! American rock ditches the pity-poor-me whingeing of grunge in favour of smiling faces, celestial Beach Boys-esque harmonies and The Tune That Ate Daytime Radio. Accompanied by the best video of the year." Paul Evans from Rolling Stone noted "the self-deprecating humor" of lines like "I look just like Buddy Holly/You're Mary Tyler Moore".

== Music video ==
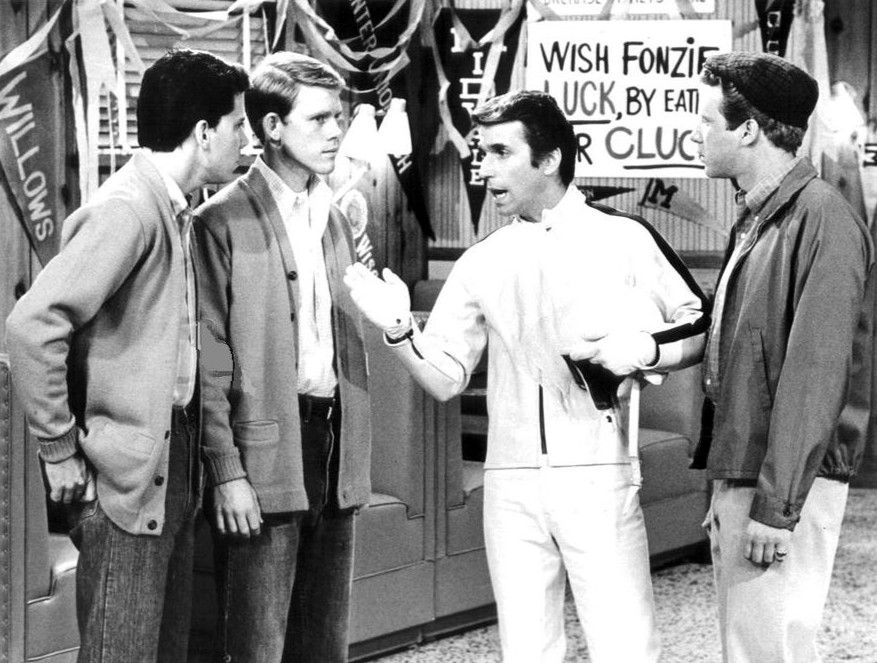
The music video takes place at Arnold's Drive-In on Happy Days (pictured in a 1975 episode).

According to Matt Sharp, Spike Jonze came up with three ideas for the accompanying music video for "Buddy Holly". Sharp stated that two of the ideas "weren't great". When Jonze pitched the idea that came to be the song's video, Sharp told Jonze "I don't think you'll be able to pull it off", but the band agreed to do it. The video was filmed at Charlie Chaplin Studios in Hollywood over a single day and portrays Weezer performing at Arnold's Drive-In from the 1970s television show Happy Days, combining footage of the band with clips from the show. Happy Days cast member Al Molinaro makes a cameo in character as Al Delvecchio, introducing the band and describing them as "Kenosha, Wisconsin's own Weezer". In fact, Molinaro was from Kenosha, while Weezer is from Los Angeles.

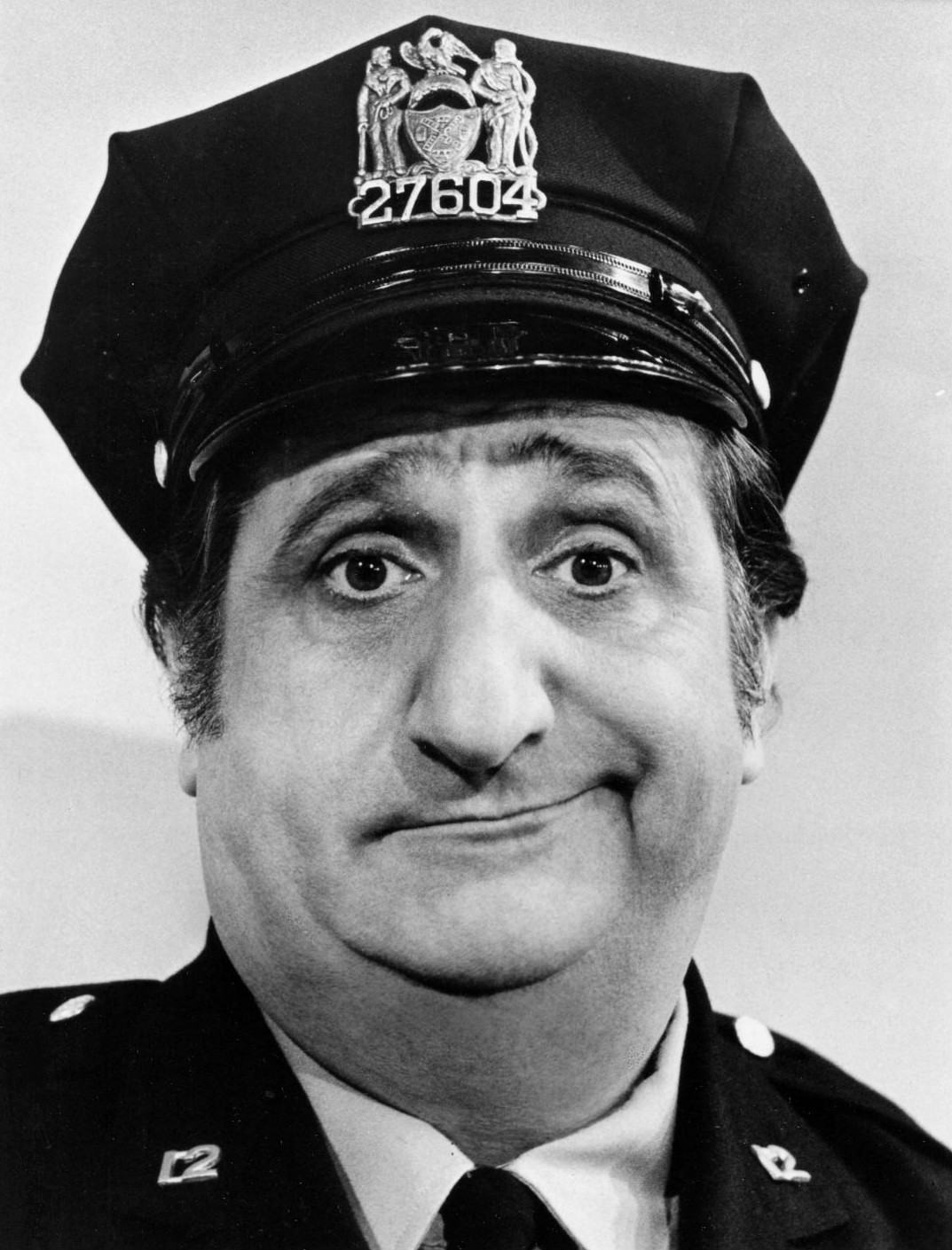
Happy Days cast member Al Molinaro reprises his role as Al Delvecchio in the video. Other cast members make cameos throughout the video.

Stylist Casey Storm acts as a body double in the climax, alllowing Fonzie to dance to the band's performance. The video also features brief cameos by some members of the band as dancers at Arnold's. Anson Williams, who played Potsie on Happy Days, objected to footage of him appearing in the video, but relented after receiving a letter from David Geffen, founder of Geffen Records. According to drummer Pat Wilson, the video was achieved without computer graphics, only "clever" camerawork and editing. At the end of the video, Al is closing up the restaurant after everyone has left for the night, and he asks the band if anyone tried the fish. Sharp replies that it was not very good, after which the band leaves and Al shuts off the lights while grumbling to himself. Sharp stated that the video was "pretty fucking wacky".

The video was met with great popularity, and heavy rotation on MTV. At the 1995 MTV Video Music Awards, it won Best Alternative Video, Breakthrough Video, Best Direction and Best Editing, and was nominated for Video of the Year.

The "Buddy Holly" video was included on the Windows 95 installation CD-ROM, resulting in a skyrocket in popularity and earning Weezer a place in the MTV Music Video Awards. Geffen did not tell Weezer they had negotiated with Microsoft to include the video; the band members, none of whom owned computers, were oblivious to the implications. According to Wilson, "I was furious because at the time I was like, 'How are they allowed to do this without permission?' Turns out it was one of the greatest things that could have happened to us. Can you imagine that happening today? It's like, there's one video on YouTube, and it's your video."

The video also appears in the music exhibit in the Museum of Modern Art. The music video was featured in Season 5, Episode 30 of MTV's Beavis and Butthead entitled "Here Comes the Bride's Butt" on June 9, 1995.

== Impact and legacy ==
In 2004 and 2010, Rolling Stone ranked "Buddy Holly" numbers 497 and 499 in its list of "The 500 Greatest Songs of All Time". In 2021, the song was raised 15 spots in their updated list. In December 2007, VH1 ranked it as the 59th greatest song of the 1990s. In 2024, Forbes magazine ranked it number 45 in their list of "The 50 Best Songs of the 1990s", writing, "Weezer's 'Buddy Holly' isn't your average alt-rock anthem — it's a quirky, nostalgic trip back to the 1950s. With its catchy hooks and geeky charm, it's no wonder it captured the hearts of listeners everywhere. Lead singer Rivers Cuomo was a perfect fit for the song, which seemed to compare him to the late Holly in a fun way."

== Track listings ==
- UK 7-inch and cassette single
1. "Buddy Holly" (LP version) – 2:40
2. "Jamie" (Geffen Rarities LP version) – 4:18
- UK CD single
1. "Buddy Holly" (LP version) – 2:40
2. "My Name Is Jonas" (live version) – 3:40
3. "Surf Wax America" (live version) – 4:09
4. "Jamie" (Geffen Rarities LP version) – 4:18
- Dutch CD single
1. "Buddy Holly" (LP version)
2. "Surf Wax America" (live)
- European maxi-CD single
1. "Buddy Holly" (LP version)
2. "My Name Is Jonas" (live)
3. "Surf Wax America" (live)
- Australian CD and cassette single
1. "Buddy Holly" (LP version) – 2:40
2. "Holiday" (LP version)

== Personnel ==
Weezer

- Rivers Cuomo – lead vocals, guitar, Korg synthesizer, handclaps
- Brian Bell – backing vocals
- Matt Sharp – bass, backing vocals
- Patrick Wilson – drums

Additional performer

- Karl Koch – handclaps

Production

- Ric Ocasek – producer
- Chris Shaw – engineer
- Hal Belknap - assistant engineer
- David Heglmeirer – assistant engineer
- Daniel Smith – assistant engineer
- George Marino – mastering

== Charts ==
=== Weekly charts ===
1994–1995 weekly chart performance for "Buddy Holly"
Chart (1994–1995)	Peak position
Australia (ARIA)	68
Canada Top Singles (RPM)	6
Canada Adult Contemporary (RPM)	26
Europe (Eurochart Hot 100)	33
Iceland (Íslenski Listinn Topp 40)	13
Ireland (IRMA)	19
Netherlands (Dutch Top 40)	31
Netherlands (Single Top 100)	27
Scottish Singles Sales (Official Charts)	10
Sweden (Sverigetopplistan)	14
UK Singles (Official Charts)	12
US Radio Songs (Billboard)	18
US Alternative Airplay (Billboard)	2
US Mainstream Rock Airplay (Billboard)	34
US Pop Airplay (Billboard)	17

2025 weekly chart performance for "Buddy Holly"
Chart (2025)	Peak position
Russia Streaming (TopHit)	97

=== Year-end charts ===
Year-end chart performance for "Buddy Holly"
Chart (1995)	Position
Canada Top Singles (RPM)	46
Sweden (Topplistan)	80
US Hot 100 Airplay (Billboard)	68
US Modern Rock Tracks (Billboard)	40

== Certifications ==
Certifications and sales for "Buddy Holly"
Region	Certification	Certified units/sales
New Zealand (RMNZ)	Platinum	30,000^{‡}
United Kingdom (BPI)	Platinum	600,000^{‡}
United States (RIAA)	4× Platinum	4,000,000^{‡}
^{‡} Sales+streaming figures based on certification alone.
