= Jason Cropper =

American musician (born 1971)

- Born: Jason Rosanoff Cropper; June 27, 1971 (age 54)
- Origin: Oakland, California, U.S.
- Genres: Alternative rock; power pop; pop-punk
- Occupations: Singer; musician; songwriter
- Instruments: Vocals; guitar; bass
- Years active: 1985–present
- Label: Geffen
- Formerly of: Weezer; 22 Jacks; Chopper One; Fliptop

Jason Rosanoff Cropper (born June 27, 1971) is an American musician. He was a founding member and guitarist of the American alternative rock band Weezer, prior to his firing before the release of their self-titled debut album.

== Biography ==
=== Weezer ===
Cropper was the original rhythm guitarist for Weezer, and as such was present at the band's first official band practice on February 14, 1992. He recorded on the band's first three official demo tapes prior to their signing to Geffen Records.

During the recording of their debut album, Weezer (aka The Blue Album) in 1993, Cropper learned that Amy Wellner, his girlfriend in Los Angeles, was pregnant. The ramifications of this news started affecting Cropper's personality and disrupting the band's working environment. When Wellner showed up unannounced in New York with no place to stay, Rivers Cuomo considered it the final straw and informed Cropper that he had to leave the band. Weezer collaborator Karl Koch said: "He wasn't handling it well ... he always said he was fine, and then 20 minutes later he'd be up on the roof of Electric Lady screaming or something." According to Cropper, lead singer Rivers Cuomo told him he could not allow him to jeopardize the band's work and asked him to leave. He was replaced by guitarist Brian Bell.

In 2014, Cropper said Cuomo had made the right decision, later remarking that he felt "weird to be this generation's Syd Barrett or Pete Best. But it's pretty cool too." In 2019, he said he believed Cuomo fired him mainly because of his relationship with his girlfriend, who visited the band while they recorded in New York, defying Cuomo's "no-girlfriends-while-we’re-recording" rule. Bassist Matt Sharp said the decision was not triggered by a single event, but instead a series of "tiny infractions" that threatened the band's chemistry. Cuomo felt that if they were going to change the band, they had to do it before they released their first album and shot the album cover. Cropper received a credit on "My Name Is Jonas" for writing the intro.

The song "Jamie", featured on the 1994 DGC Rarities, Vol. 1 compilation, was recorded in 1993 and features Cropper on guitar and backing vocals. Prior to the expanded deluxe edition of The Blue Album in 2004, this was the only Weezer track released to feature Cropper on guitar and backing vocals.

Despite being fired from the band, Cropper has remained friends with the other members of Weezer and attended Rivers Cuomo's wedding in 2006.

=== Post-Weezer ===
After Cropper left Weezer, he and his then wife, Amy Wellner Cropper, formed the band Chopper One. The pair (along with drummer Tyrone Rio) released the single "Free Lunch" in 1995, followed by the album Now Playing in 1997.

In January 1994, their first child daughter Kiefer Rain Cropper, was born. Their son Jake Hudson Cropper, was born in 1999, and another daughter Devon Jade Cropper, was born in 2001. The couple divorced in 2004–2005.

In 1996, Cropper played guitar on Uncle Bob, an alt-rock album from 22 Jacks, which featured members of Wax, The Ramones, Adolescents and Agent Orange.

=== 2000s ===
After Chopper One ended, Cropper started the pop punk supergroup Fliptop self-releasing a 5-track EP. The band consisted of Cropper on vocals, guitars and piano, Dallan Baumgarten on guitars & vocals, Scott Shiflett on bass and Josh Freese on drums. The band played live shows around LA, and some local Warped Tour Shows.

Cropper sang the theme song for the 2002–2003 American sitcom Andy Richter Controls the Universe and in early 2006 began showing signs of returning to the music business. In addition to posting songs on his MySpace page, he started recording and producing bands, including the Atlanta-based rock band Buffalo Alice, producing their second album Mitchell (2007) and credited for writing at least one song and playing guitar and singing on several songs. He continued to contribute to Buffalo Alice, co-writing and producing their third album Alexander Rosenhoff Testament: A Work Of Fiction (2008), and was listed for a time as bass player on the band's website.

=== 2010s–2020s ===
In 2018, Cropper performed with Cuomo at two separate shows in San Francisco, in their first collaboration since Cropper's departure from Weezer.

In April 2020, Cropper appeared on Cuomo's "Island in the Zoom" shows. Also in April 2020, Cropper appeared on two episodes of the "We'z Talkin' Weez' 2 Thee" podcast; one playing and discussing new music and the other breaking down Weezer's "The Blue Album" track by track. Throughout 2020, Cropper performed livestreams on Facebook called "The Golden Hour." In July 2020, Cropper released his solo debut single "Goodness Knows".

In 2021, Weezer released their fifteenth album, Van Weezer, and the vinyl edition included the bonus track "I've Thrown It All Away" which was a re-recorded version of a song the band had demoed when Cropper was still in the band. He also has a writing credit on the track.

== Discography ==
With Weezer

- The Kitchen Tape (1992)

With 22 Jacks

- Uncle Bob (1996)

With Chopper One

- Now Playing (1997)
