= Only in Dreams (song) =

1994 song by Weezer

Song by Weezer

from the album Weezer (The Blue Album)
- Released: May 10, 1994
- Recorded: August–September 1993
- Studio: Electric Lady (New York City)
- Genre: Alternative rock; power pop; emo pop; post-rock
- Length: 7:59 (Original Master): 8:03 (Remastered)
- Label: DGC
- Songwriter: Rivers Cuomo
- Producer: Ric Ocasek

"Only in Dreams" is a song by American rock band Weezer. It is the tenth and final track on their 1994 self-titled debut album. At 7 minutes and 59 seconds, it is Weezer's longest song to date. It is noteworthy for its three-minute crescendo of the three guitars, bass, and drums, in which the dynamics gradually increase and the timbre builds up layers until the climaxing guitar solo at the end.

== Background ==
The song's lyrics tell of a man’s infatuation with a girl he does not think he can be with, only able to fantasize about being with her in his dreams, hence the title of the song. In a 2010 interview with Rolling Stone, Weezer's Rivers Cuomo stated, "I think most of our audience always thought it was a song about a girl when I'm really singing about my artistic process." In a 2023 interview with Chris Shiflett, Cuomo said the long instrumental portion of the song was inspired by the jam band Phish and their guitarist Trey Anastasio. Cuomo said, "I went to Phish shows and had the tapes, and it was like, man, this is just so transcendent, the way [Anastasio] plays – and that's kind of what I wanted to do." Cuomo recalled that many of their earlier songs ended with lengthy jams because they had not written endings to them, and producer Ric Ocasek had shortened most of them to "normal endings" aside from "Only in Dreams".

== Reception ==
When asked in 2006 which Weezer guitar solo he is the most proud of/likes the most, Cuomo answered, "I'd have to go with 'Only in Dreams' and [Make Believe track] 'Haunt You Every Day' for sheer length. Epic, epic, epic. So few people play these kinds of solos anymore."

IGN included "Only in Dreams" on their "Weezer Ultimate Mix" list, where they listed what songs they want to be compiled into a Weezer collection and called the song "the 'Stairway to Heaven' for Generation X." They also listed the song on their "Top 10 Ambiguously Inspiring Songs" list, where they called it one of Weezer's best songs. Magnet considered "Only in Dreams" to be the third most overrated Weezer song. The song was rated number 8 in Q Magazine's "20 Greatest Guitar Tracks" in September 2007. Melissa Bobbitt at About.com ranked it as the number 1 best Weezer song, stating "This is Weezer at their finest. From the syrupy opening bass line, to the sincere guitar work and the gawking lyrics, the immense closing song on their debut best represents the band".

In an article devoted to the song by Kevin McFarland at The A.V. Club, he described it as "Cuomo's epic masterpiece", as well as a "glorious anomaly in the Weezer canon".

Rolling Stone regarded the song as a "real gem." PopMatters calls the song a "Bohemian Rhapsody"-worthy conclusion."

== Live performances ==
"Only In Dreams" had typically been played at the end of a regular set (before the encore). However, this was not true for the Summer of 2002 Enlightenment tour, when the set lists were determined by the roll of a 20-sided die. The song was played live at The Roxy for the first time since 2015 on March 15, 2023.

== Covers ==
Ash has covered the song as a B-side of their 2001 single "Burn Baby Burn".

Mock Orange has covered the song on the album Rock Music: A Tribute to Weezer.

You Blew It! has covered the song for their Weezer cover album You Blue It.

Japanese artist Saku covered the song in her 2015 release Girls & Boys E.P.

Japanese rock band Asian Kung-Fu Generation covered the song live with former Weezer bassist Matt Sharp in 2013.

Murder by Death covered the song on their fan funded cover album "As You Wish Volume 2".

Frank Dukes, performing as Ging, covered the song for a single release in 2023.

== Personnel ==
Weezer

- Rivers Cuomo – lead vocals, guitar
- Brian Bell – backing vocals
- Matt Sharp – bass, backing vocals
- Patrick Wilson – drums

Production

- Ric Ocasek – producer
- Chris Shaw – engineer
- Hal Belknap - assistant engineer
- David Heglmeirer – assistant engineer
- Daniel Smith – assistant engineer
- George Marino – mastering
