= Undone – The Sweater Song =

1994 single by Weezer

Single by Weezer

from the album Weezer (The Blue Album)
- B-side: "Holiday"; "Mykel & Carli"; "Susanne"; "My Evaline"
- Released: June 7, 1994
- Studio: Electric Lady (New York City)
- Genre: Alternative rock; power pop; emo
- Length: 5:05 (album version); 3:58 (single radio edit)
- Label: DGC
- Songwriter: Rivers Cuomo (Note: On April 19, 2002, bassist Matt Sharp filed a five-count federal lawsuit against Weezer, with one of his allegations being that he co-wrote “Undone – The Sweater Song”. The suit was later settled out of court.)
- Producer: Ric Ocasek

Weezer singles chronology
"Undone – The Sweater Song" (1994)	"Buddy Holly" (1994)

Music video
- "Undone – The Sweater Song" on YouTube

"Undone – The Sweater Song" is a song by American alternative rock band Weezer, released in June 1994 from their self-titled debut album as their debut single. The song is a slower rock song of 80 beats per minute with a length of nearly five minutes. "Undone – The Sweater Song" got acclaim for its hit MTV music video.

== Background ==
The band originally intended to insert various sound clips into "Undone", but were wary of the cost of licensing them. Instead, the studio version of the track features a spoken introduction by bassist Matt Sharp and Karl Koch, a longtime friend of the band. The track also features dialogue between Koch and Mykel Allan, an early supporter of the band. This dialogue is frequently ad-libbed during concerts and other live recordings.

Weezer frontman Rivers Cuomo has commented on the song, saying:

"Undone" is the feeling you get when the train stops and the little guy comes knockin' on your door. It was supposed to be a sad song, but everyone thinks it's hilarious.

Cuomo has also said that it was his attempt at writing "a Velvet Underground-type song," but he later called the song an inadvertent derivative of Metallica's "Welcome Home (Sanitarium)", with the band's metal roots showing through.

The song was originally known as simply "Undone" but the band added "The Sweater Song" to the title after fans at their early shows repeatedly referred to the song as "the sweater song" or "that song about the sweater." As Cuomo thought that song titles with parentheses look "ugly", a dash was used in the title.

== Composition ==
"Undone – The Sweater Song" is a mid-tempo alternative rock song that runs for a duration of five minutes and five seconds. Its musical arrangement utilizes dynamics and thick distortion during the chorus in order to drive home the song's melody. The song is written in the time signature of common time, with a moderately slow rock tempo of 80 beats per minute. "Undone – The Sweater Song" is composed in the key of G♭ major. It has a basic sequence of G♭_{6}–C♭_{7}–D♭_{7}–C♭_{7} during the intro and interludes, changes to G♭–C♭–D♭–C♭ in the verses and follows G♭_{5}–C♭_{5}–D♭_{5}–C♭_{5} at the chorus as its chord progression. During the guitar solo, it modulates up to the key of A major, and follows A_{5}–D_{5}–E_{5}, before returning to the key of G♭ major. The song opens with a circular riff built from picked guitar strings. The spoken dialogue features adolescent characters engaged in frivolous conversation as the band's music gradually rises in the background.

== Critical reception ==
Tom Maginis for AllMusic wrote, "The song is not only meticulously crafted, it's smart, quirky, poignant, and insanely catchy -- all characteristics that would go on to define Weezer as a band and their debut as one of the most successful alternative rock records of the '90s."

== Music video ==
The music video for "Undone" was Weezer's first music video. According to Rivers' Edge: The Weezer Story by John D. Luerssen, the band insisted that the video not have anything to do with a sweater; yet, Geffen received 25 treatments for the video, all involving sweaters. The video marks one of the early directorial efforts of Spike Jonze, whose pitch was simply "A blue stage, a steadicam, a pack of wild dogs." The $60,000 video was shot on a Steadicam in one unbroken shot, featuring the band playing to a sped up version of the song. When played at a slower speed, the illusion is created that the band is playing the song in the correct time, yet moving in slow motion. The one shot was taken over 25 times, and the final version is between take number 15 and take number 20, in which the band had abandoned the idea of taking the video seriously at all. The humor was brought on by the frustration of shooting the same shot over and over to a sped up version of the song as well as the fact that one of the dogs defecated on Patrick Wilson's bass drum pedal. The video also starts out in a corridor with people that leads into the set that seems upside-down; in fact, the set was right-side-up, and the corridor was upside down, with the people in the corridor hanging from the ceiling using ankle hooks.

The video became an instant hit on MTV. An alternate take of the video can be found on the band's Video Capture Device DVD.

For their official video for their cover of "Africa" by Toto, Weezer used a parody of the "Undone" video with stand-ins for themselves, including "Weird Al" Yankovic as Cuomo's stand-in.

== Live performances ==
During live performances in 2005, the band would often invite a fan up to play the acoustic guitar part of "Undone" with the band. On the last night of the Foozer tour, Dave Grohl came up and played it with the band. On the 2008 Troublemaker Tour, Tom DeLonge – lead singer of the tour's opening act Angels & Airwaves – sang it as a duet with Cuomo. On their tour in 2011, the song was performed with the members of the Flaming Lips.

== Track listings ==
US 7-inch and cassette single

A. "Undone – The Sweater Song" (LP version) – 4:55
B. "Holiday" (LP version) – 3:26

Australian CD single

1. "Undone – The Sweater Song" (LP version) – 4:55
2. "Mykel & Carli" – 2:33
3. "Susanne" – 2:46
4. "My Evaline" (erroneously listed as "Sweet Adeline") – 0:46

Australian cassette single

1. "Undone – The Sweater Song" (LP version) – 4:55
2. "Mykel & Carli" – 2:33

UK CD, cassette, and 7-inch blue vinyl single

1. "Undone – The Sweater Song" (LP version) – 4:55
2. "Mykel & Carli" – 2:53
3. "Susanne" – 2:46
4. "Holiday" (LP version) – 3:26

French CD single

1. "Undone – The Sweater Song" (LP version) – 4:55
2. "My Name Is Jonas" (LP version) – 3:23

== Personnel ==
Weezer

- Rivers Cuomo – lead vocals, guitars
- Matt Sharp – bass, backing vocals, dialogue
- Patrick Wilson – drums
- Brian Bell – backing vocals

Additional personnel

- Mykel Allen – dialogue
- Karl Koch – dialogue, piano

Production

- Ric Ocasek – producer
- Chris Shaw – engineer
- Hal Belknap - assistant engineer
- David Heglmeirer – assistant engineer
- Daniel Smith – assistant engineer
- George Marino – mastering

== Charts ==
=== Weekly charts ===
Weekly chart performance for "Undone – The Sweater Song"
Chart (1994)	Peak position
Australia (ARIA)	63
Europe (Eurochart Hot 100)	71
Scottish Singles Sales (Official Charts)	31
UK Singles (Official Charts)	35
US Billboard Hot 100	57
US Alternative Airplay (Billboard)	6
US Mainstream Rock Airplay (Billboard)	30

=== Weekly charts ===
Year-end chart performance for "Undone – The Sweater Song"
Chart (1994)	Position
US Modern Rock Tracks (Billboard)	20

== Certifications ==
Certifications for "Undone – The Sweater Song"
Region	Certification	Certified units/sales
New Zealand (RMNZ)	Gold	15,000^{‡}
United Kingdom (BPI)	Silver	200,000^{‡}
United States (RIAA)	2× Platinum	2,000,000^{‡}
^{‡} Sales+streaming figures based on certification alone.

== Release history ==
Release dates and formats for "Undone – The Sweater Song"
Region	Date	Format(s)	Label(s)	Ref.
United States	June 7, 1994	Modern rock radio	DGC	
Australia	August 29, 1994	CD	Geffen	
United Kingdom	January 30, 1995	7-inch vinyl; CD; cassette	Geffen	

== Cover versions ==
The Offspring covered it in 1994 and 1995. NewFangled Contraption covered it at every show in 2002 and 2003. The Fray, who toured with Weezer in 2005, played a cover version of the song live during 2007 touring. Bloodhound Gang covered it with a mix of Wu-Tang Clan's "Ain't Nuthing ta F Wit". Punk rock band Titus Andronicus have covered the song multiple times on various tours; the band included one of these live covers on their mixtape, Titus Andronicus LLC Mixtape Vol 1. Mac DeMarco performed a version of the song in April 2013 for The A.V. Club's A.V. Undercover series. In May 2013, UK-based label Tiny Lights Recordings released a cover of the song recorded by a number of its artists to commemorate its second birthday. The song was also covered by dream pop band Beach House live in 2015.

== Bibliography ==
- Luerssen, John D. (2004). Rivers' Edge: The Weezer Story. ECW Press. ISBN 978-1-55022-619-5.
