= Say It Ain't So =

1995 single by Weezer

Single by Weezer

from the album Weezer (The Blue Album)
- B-side: "No One Else" (live acoustic); "Jamie" (live acoustic)
- Released: May 15, 1995
- Studio: Electric Lady (New York City)
- Genre: Alternative rock; emo
- Length: 4:18
- Label: DGC
- Songwriter: Rivers Cuomo
- Producer: Ric Ocasek

Weezer singles chronology
"Buddy Holly" (1994)	"Say It Ain't So" (1995)	"El Scorcho" (1996)

Music video
- "Say It Ain't So" on YouTube

"Say It Ain't So" is a song by the American rock band Weezer. It was released as the third and final single from the band's self-titled 1994 debut album on May 15, 1995. Written by frontman Rivers Cuomo, the song came to be after he had all the music finished and one line, "Say it ain't so." Cuomo made a connection to an incident in high school where he came home and saw a bottle of beer in the refrigerator. He believed his mother and father's marriage ended because his father was an alcoholic, and this made him fear the marriage between his mother and stepfather would end this way as well.

"Say It Ain't So" is widely considered one of the band's best songs. In 2015, Loudwire ranked the song number three on their list of the 10 greatest Weezer songs, and in 2021, Kerrang ranked the song number two on their list of the 20 greatest Weezer songs. In 2008, Rolling Stone ranked "Say It Ain't So" number 72 on their list of "The 100 Greatest Guitar Songs of All Time." Pitchfork included the song at number 10 on its "Top 200 Tracks of the 1990s."

== Background and composition ==
"Say It Ain't So" is an alternative rock and emo song with a duration of 4 minutes and 18 seconds. According to the sheet music published at Musicnotes.com by Hal Leonard Music, it is written in the time signature of common time, with a moderate rock tempo of 76 beats per minute in the key of C minor.

In an official Genius annotation made by Cuomo, he said that Patrick Wilson helped him to write the song; he asked Pat what a two-syllable word for refrigerator was and Pat immediately said "Icebox!"

In the Spotify Blue Album 30th Anniversary session, Cuomo stated that when they first wrote the song, it was called “The Classic Rock Song.” It didn’t have any of the ska beats. It was just strumming and “sounded pretty lame.” He then made a second demo that focused only on the arrangement of the guitar and bass parts. His inspirations for this were Wax’s song “Hush” and a Pixies song. The chordal hammering of the intro was influenced by Jimi Hendrix’s “Axis: Bold as Love.”

== Music video ==
The music video for "Say It Ain't So", directed by Sophie Muller, was met with less success than the previous two Weezer videos, which were directed by Spike Jonze. However, the song still successfully climbed to the top 10 of the Modern Rock Tracks chart. As noted in the Weezer DVD collection Video Capture Device and the slip cover of the re-released special edition of the group's debut album, the band filmed the music video at the house where the band used to rehearse and record. The video also features a cameo by the band's webmaster/band photographer/archivist and close friend for many years Karl Koch. A small poster of Mercyful Fate/King Diamond frontman King Diamond is visible several times throughout the video, most clearly during the final chorus, just as Rivers Cuomo turns his mic around.

== Track listing ==
Standard CD, 10-inch, and cassette single

All tracks written by Rivers Cuomo.

1. "Say It Ain't So" (remix) – 4:17
2. "No One Else" (live and acoustic) – 3:15
3. "Jamie" (live and acoustic) – 3:53
- All live acoustic tracks were recorded on 99X in Atlanta, Georgia

== Personnel ==
- Rivers Cuomo – vocals, guitar
- Matt Sharp – bass, backing vocals
- Patrick Wilson – drums

Production

- Ric Ocasek – producer
- Chris Shaw – engineer
- Hal Belknap - assistant engineer
- David Heglmeirer – assistant engineer
- Daniel Smith – assistant engineer
- George Marino – mastering

== Charts ==
=== Weekly charts ===
Chart (1995)	Peak position
Canada Rock/Alternative (RPM)	11
Scottish Singles Sales (Official Charts)	43
UK Singles (Official Charts)	37
US Radio Songs (Billboard)	51
US Alternative Airplay (Billboard)	7

=== Year-end charts ===
Chart (1995)	Position
US Modern Rock Tracks (Billboard)	14

== Certifications ==
Region	Certification	Certified units/sales
New Zealand (RMNZ)	3× Platinum	90,000^{‡}
United Kingdom (BPI)	Gold	400,000^{‡}
United States (RIAA)	7× Platinum	7,000,000^{‡}
^{‡} Sales+streaming figures based on certification alone.

== Release history ==
Region	Date	Format(s)	Label(s)	Ref.
United States	May 15, 1995	Alternative radio	DGC	
United States	June 27, 1995	Contemporary hit radio	DGC	
Australia	July 3, 1995	CD	Geffen	
United States	July 10, 1995	Mainstream rock; active rock radio	DGC	
United Kingdom	July 10, 1995	10-inch vinyl; CD; cassette	Geffen	

== Sample ==
Asher Roth sampled the song for his debut rap single "I Love College". After the song leaked onto the internet, Rivers Cuomo reportedly refused to clear the sample, which prompted Roth to debut a remixed version of his song as his official debut single.

== In popular culture ==
"Say It Ain't So" is a playable track in the video games Rock Band and Rocksmith 2014, in addition to appearing on an episode of the television series Hindsight (2015). In October 2024, "Say It Ain't So" was added to the Epic Games rhythm-based game Fortnite Festival.
