= Weezer (Blue Album) =

1994 studio album by Weezer

Studio album by Weezer
- Released: May 10, 1994
- Recorded: August–September 1993
- Studios: Electric Lady, New York City
- Genres: Power pop; geek rock; pop-punk; alternative rock; indie rock; emo; post-grunge
- Length: 41:36
- Label: DGC
- Producer: Ric Ocasek

Weezer chronology
The Kitchen Tape (1992)	Weezer (1994)	Pinkerton (1996)

Singles from Weezer
- 1. "Undone – The Sweater Song" Released: June 24, 1994; 2. "Buddy Holly" Released: September 7, 1994; 3. "Say It Ain't So" Released: July 13, 1995

Weezer (commonly known as the Blue Album) is the debut studio album by the American rock band Weezer, released on May 10, 1994, by DGC Records. It was produced by Ric Ocasek.

Weezer was formed in Los Angeles in 1992, and initially struggled to engage audiences, who were more interested in grunge. Their demo The Kitchen Tape brought them to the attention of DGC owner Geffen Records. Weezer selected Ocasek because of his work with the Cars.

Most of the album was recorded at Electric Lady Studios in New York City between August and September 1993. The group treated the guitars and bass as a single, 10-string instrument, playing in unison. The guitarist Jason Cropper was fired during recording, as the band felt he was threatening their chemistry; he was replaced by Brian Bell.

Weezer was supported by the singles "Undone – The Sweater Song", "Buddy Holly", and "Say It Ain't So", which were accompanied by music videos. The album received acclaim and reached number sixteen on the Billboard 200, and was certified five-times platinum in the US in 2024. It remains Weezer's best-selling album, with more than 15 million copies sold worldwide by 2009. It has been named one of the best albums of the 1990s by several publications. In 2020, Rolling Stone ranked it number 294 on its list of the "500 Greatest Albums of All Time". In 2026, it was selected by the Library of Congress for preservation in the National Recording Registry.

== Background ==
Weezer was formed on February 14, 1992, in Los Angeles by singer and guitarist Rivers Cuomo, drummer Pat Wilson, bassist Matt Sharp, and guitarist Jason Cropper. Although they performed future hits including "Undone – The Sweater Song" and "Say It Ain't So", Cuomo said they struggled to engage audiences, who wanted to see grunge bands instead.

In an effort to create buzz around Los Angeles, Weezer recorded a demo, The Kitchen Tape. This attracted attention from major-label A&R reps looking for alternative rock bands to perform on the same bill as That Dog. Weezer were signed to DGC Records on June 26, 1993, by Todd Sullivan, an A&R rep from Geffen Records.

== Recording and production ==
While preparing for the studio sessions, Weezer focused on their vocal interplay by practicing barbershop quartet-style songs, which helped Cuomo and Sharp feel more comfortable collaborating during rehearsals. Sharp, who had never sung before joining Weezer, developed his falsetto: "I had to sing an octave higher than Rivers. After a lot of practice, I started to get it down."

Weezer rehearsed 15 songs in New York City in preparation for the Electric Lady Studios sessions. Four songs from this rehearsal were not included on the album: "I Swear It's True", "Getting Up and Leaving", a reprise of "In the Garage", and "Mykel and Carli", an ode to the sisters Mykel and Carli Allan, who ran the Weezer fanclub. Weezer later recorded another version of "Mykel and Carli" as a B-side for the single "Undone – The Sweater Song", with the Weezer collaborator Karl Koch.

Weezer considered self-producing the album, but were pressured by Geffen to choose a producer. They decided on Ric Ocasek, who was the frontman for the Cars. Ocasek was selected because of his work on the Cars' song "Just What I Needed", which Cuomo said sounded similar to the way that he wanted Weezer to sound like. Ocasek convinced them to switch their guitar pickups from the neck to the bridge, resulting in a brighter sound. Sharp and Cuomo imposed several rules on recording, banning reverb and insisting on all downstrokes on guitar. According to the engineer Chris Shaw, the "overriding concept" was to treat the guitars and bass as a single, 10-string instrument, playing in unison. Weezer insisted that the guitars were mixed as loudly as those in Radiohead's 1992 song "Creep", burying some vocals. Aside from delay used in the swells on "Only in Dreams", the album makes no use of guitar effects.

During the recording, Cropper learned that his girlfriend was pregnant and began acting erratically. Koch said: "He wasn't handling it well ... He always said he was fine, and then 20 minutes later he'd be up on the roof of Electric Lady screaming or something." Sharp said later that "whatever it is we were setting out to do, it felt like it was gonna be much more difficult if he stayed". Sharp and Cuomo felt that Cropper would likely leave Weezer eventually and so wanted to remove him before the release of their debut, as they "wanted things to be very stable for the audience". According to Cropper, Cuomo told him he could not allow him to jeopardize the work and asked him to leave. In 2014, Cropper said Cuomo had made the right decision.

Cropper left after recording was complete, and was replaced by Brian Bell. While Bell's vocals appear on some tracks, Cuomo re-recorded all of Cropper's guitar parts. Ocasek recalled: "Rivers came in and said, 'I'm firing the guitar player, and I'm going to do all his guitar parts over.' I said, 'You can't do that!' But he did. In one take." Bell is credited in the liner notes for playing guitar, while Cropper received a credit on "My Name Is Jonas" for writing the intro.

== Music and lyrics ==
Musically, Weezer has been described as power pop, geek rock, pop-punk, alternative rock, indie rock, emo, and post-grunge. The album has been described as a fusion of "chart-angled hook-craft" with "roaring" guitar distortion, confessional lyrics and "unashamedly vibrant" melodies. Andy Price of Guitar.com stated that the album's sound and aesthetic were "distinctly non-alternative", stating that the band instead "took their style cues from the DIY slackers of the lo-fi indie scene, albeit with a broader audience in mind." Stephen Thomas Erlewine of AllMusic described the album's sound as "sunny, heavy guitar pop." According to Tim Sendra, also of AllMusic, the album "skillfully fuses the raucous energy of punk, the loser-friendly geekiness of indie rock, the guitar power of grunge, and the huge hooks of radio rock -- then adds some heavy metal guitar heroics and Rivers Cuomo's oddball lyrical perspective." David Silverberg of Grammy Awards wrote that the album is "brimming with [...] chunky riffs [and] sublime solos."

The first single, "Undone – The Sweater Song", was described by Cuomo as "the feeling you get when the train stops and the little guy comes knockin' on your door. It was supposed to be a sad song, but everyone thinks it's hilarious." "Say It Ain't So" was inspired by Cuomo believing his parents split up when he was four because he thought his father was an alcoholic.

== Artwork ==
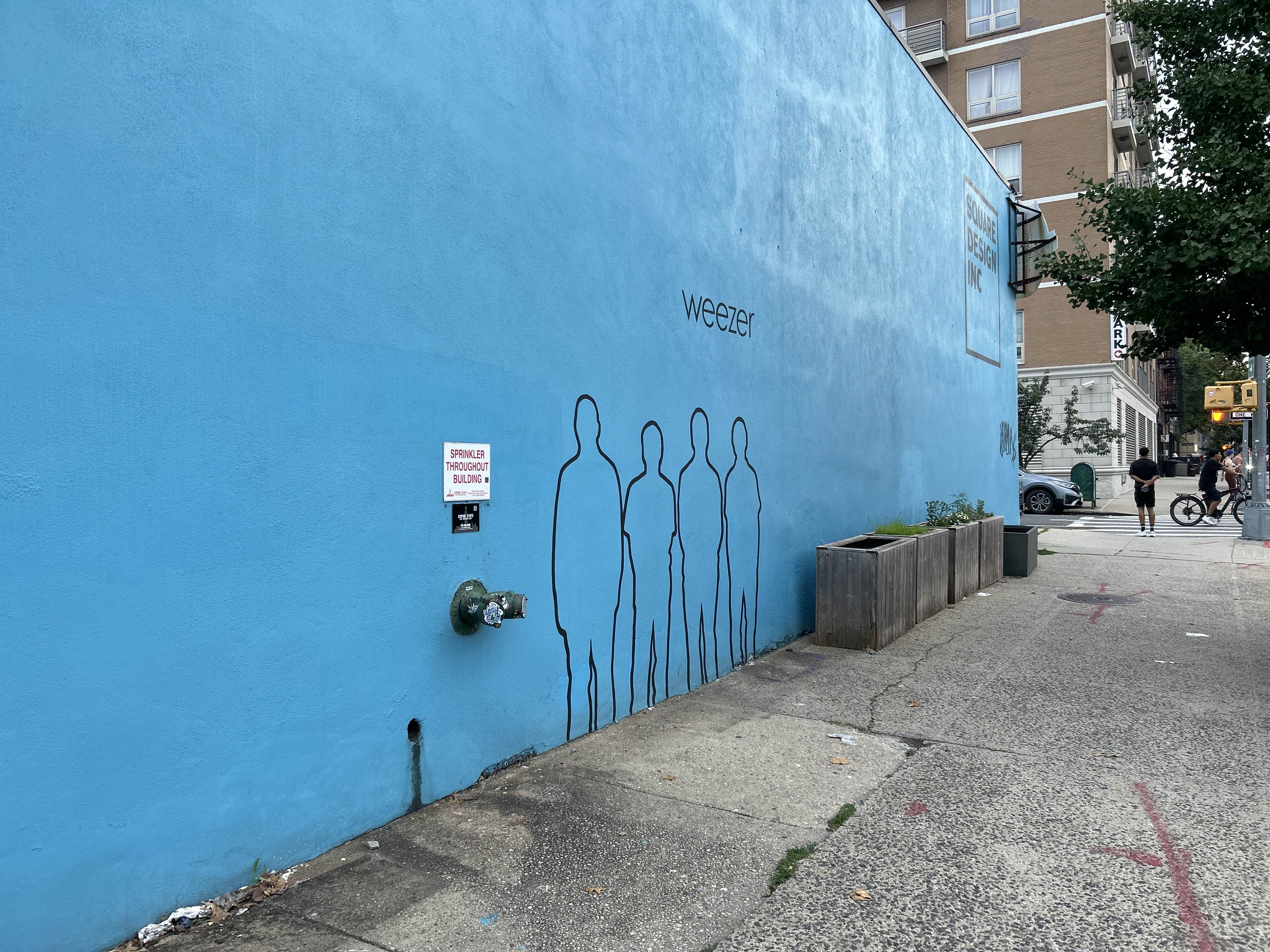
Mural based on the cover art in Brooklyn in 2024

Standing against a wall of blue, the guys in Weezer didn't look like Nirvana; they looked like Pavement, or maybe the Replacements. Without even trying, Weezer represented the mainstreaming of indie rock, even though they never made an independent record.

— Author Chuck Klosterman in the book Spin: 20 Years of Alternative Music (2005)

The album artwork was photographed by Peter Gowland. In it, Wilson, Cuomo, Sharp, and Bell are depicted standing in front of a plain blue background, "simply standing and staring at the camera." According to David Silverburg of the Grammy Awards, the album's front cover "evoked a feeling of awkward geekiness that would eventually lead to the album's designation as being the harbinger of nerd rock and its many acolytes." Cuomo stated that although the band approved of the photo, Sharp expressed dissatisfaction with the way his head was appearing, so a Geffen art director used Adobe Photoshop to replace his head with one from another shot.

The image was used prominently in advertising for the album. The cover was compared to that of the Feelies' album Crazy Rhythms, which Weezer had no prior knowledge of. Instead, according to the Weezer collaborator Karl Koch, Cuomo was inspired by the cover of a cheap Beach Boys greatest-hits cassette, which featured the Beach Boys with striped shirts in front of a blue background. In 2024, the 30th anniversary of the album, Weezer unveiled a mural based on the cover art in Brooklyn, New York City.

== Release and promotion ==
The Blue Album was released on May 10, 1994. "Undone – The Sweater Song" was released as the lead single on June 24, 1994. The video was directed by Spike Jonze, whose pitch was simply "a blue stage, a steadicam, a pack of wild dogs". The video became an instant hit on MTV. The final single, "Say It Ain't So", was released on July 13, 1995. The music video, directed by Sophie Muller, was less successful, and featured the band performing in the garage of their former house and playing hacky sack in the yard.

Weezer was certified gold on December 1, 1994, and was certified platinum on January 13, 1995. It was certified double platinum on August 8, 1995 and triple platinum on November 13, 1998. It reached no. 16 on the Billboard 200. "Undone – The Sweater Song" reached no. 35 on the UK Top 40, and "Buddy Holly" and "Say It Ain't So" reached no. 12 and no. 37 on the UK Top 40. In the U.S., "Buddy Holly" reached no. 17 on the Billboard Hot 100 Airplay chart.

A deluxe edition was released on March 23, 2004, comprising the original album and a second disc, Dusty Gems and Raw Nuggets, containing B-sides and rarities. As of December 2007, it had sold 86,000 copies. A "super deluxe edition" was released on November 1, 2024, for the album's 30th anniversary. It contains a remastered version of the album, along with BBC recordings, a variant of the Kitchen Tapes entitled Opposite Sides of the Same Good Ol' Fence, early live recordings of both released and unreleased songs, and recordings from the LMU sessions (including the previously released B-side "Jamie").

== Critical reception ==
Professional ratings
Review scores
Source	Rating
AllMusic	5/5 stars
Blender	4/5 stars
Chicago Sun-Times	3.5/4 stars
Entertainment Weekly	B (1994); A+ (2014)
NME	7/10
Pitchfork	10/10
Q	4/5 stars
Rolling Stone	4/5 stars
The Rolling Stone Album Guide	4/5 stars
Spin	A

The Blue Album received widespread critical acclaim. Rolling Stone praised the album in its year-end review, saying, "Weezer's Rivers Cuomo is great at sketching vignettes (the Dungeons & Dragons games and Kiss posters that inspire the hapless daydreamer of 'In the Garage'), and with sweet inspiration like the waltz tempo of 'My Name Is Jonas' and the self-deprecating humor of lines like "I look just like Buddy Holly / And you're Mary Tyler Moore", his songs easily ingratiate." Robert Christgau of The Village Voice was less complimentary and awarded the album a "neither" rating. The Washington Post concluded that "Weezer alternates between being agreeably irreverent and merely bratty... 'Buddy Holly' is a pleasant piece of retro-rock—actually, it sounds more like early 10cc than any song the Crickets ever performed."

The "Buddy Holly" video won four awards at the 1995 MTV Video Music Awards, including Breakthrough Video and Best Alternative Video. In 2020, Rolling Stone ranked the album number 294 on its updated "500 Greatest Albums of All Time" list.

== Legacy ==
In its lists of the "500 Greatest Albums of All Time", Rolling Stone ranked the Blue Album number 297 in 2003, number 299 in 2012, and number 294 on its 2020. In 2002, Rolling Stone readers voted it the 21st-greatest of all time. Blender named it among the "500 CDs you must own", calling it "absolute geek-rock, out and proud". In 2003, Pitchfork named it the 26th-best album of the 1990s, writing that it had disregarded grunge and punk music, "rescued the thrilling guitar solo" and "kept joy alive" in arena rock. In 2011, Guitar World named it the third-best guitar album of 1994, behind Bad Religion's Stranger than Fiction and the Offspring's Smash, and ranked it number 25 in its 2014 list of "50 iconic albums that defined 1994".

Reviewing the deluxe edition in 2004, PopMatters wrote that the Blue Album was one of the greatest albums of the preceding twenty years, and Rolling Stone described it as "big, vibrant pop-rock". In 2022, the Pacific Lutheran University editor-in-chief Nolan James wrote: "Weezer are a bit of a joke now, but they were once a critically acclaimed breath of fresh air in a dying alternative rock scene. While the rock genre was struggling to define itself as grunge’s short-lived chokehold on the music industry faded, Rivers Cuomo and co. wrote 10 joyful little rock tunes that seemed far more forward-thinking and far less afraid of its pop sensibilities than many groups at the time." AllMusic critic Stephen Thomas Erlewine gave Weezer a perfect score, commending it as "emblematic of its time" and calling it one of the most essential albums of the 1990s. NME, Rolling Stone and Mikael Wood of AOL credited the Blue Album as an influence on emo.

Weezer performed the album in its entirety during the Memories Tour in 2010. they performed it again during the Voyage to the Blue Planet tour in 2024. On March 15, they performed the album in its entirety at the Lodge Room in the Highland Park neighborhood of Los Angeles as a pre-kickoff of the Voyage Tour, with Dogstar as the opening band. Sharp attended, and Dominic Fike sang and played "Say It Ain't So" with the band as a surprise. In 2026, Weezer was selected by the Library of Congress for preservation in the National Recording Registry for its "cultural, historical or aesthetic importance in the nation's recorded sound heritage".

=== Accolades ===
Publication	Country	Accolade	Year	Rank
Blender	USA	500 CDs You Must Own Before You Die	2003	*
Music Underwater	USA	Top 100 Albums 1990–2003	2004	No. 10
Stylus Magazine	USA	Top 101–200 Albums of All Time	2004	No. 177
Pitchfork Media	USA	Top 100 Albums of the 1990s	2003	No. 26
Rolling Stone	USA	The 500 Greatest Albums of All Time	2020	No. 294
Rolling Stone	USA	The 100 Best Debut Albums of All Time	2022	No. 82
NME	UK	NME's The 500 Greatest Albums of All Time	2013	No. 250

( * ) designates lists which are unordered.

== Track listing ==
All tracks are written by Rivers Cuomo, except where noted.

No.	Title	Writer(s)	Length
1.	"My Name Is Jonas"	Cuomo; Patrick Wilson; Jason Cropper	3:23
2.	"No One Else"		3:14
3.	"The World Has Turned and Left Me Here"	Cuomo; Wilson	4:26
4.	"Buddy Holly"		2:40
5.	"Undone – The Sweater Song"	(Note: On April 19, 2002, bassist Matt Sharp filed a five-count federal lawsuit against Weezer, with one of his allegations being that he co-wrote “Undone – The Sweater Song”. The suit was later settled out of court.)	5:05
6.	"Surf Wax America"	Cuomo; Wilson	3:04
7.	"Say It Ain't So"		4:18
8.	"In the Garage"		3:56
9.	"Holiday"		3:26
10.	"Only in Dreams"		8:03
Total length:			41:25

== Personnel ==
Credits taken from CD booklet, except where noted.

Weezer

- Brian Bell – guitar (credit only); (Note: Despite being credited for guitar and vocals in the liner notes, Bell's late arrival to the recording sessions meant that he only had time to re-record Jason Cropper's backing vocals, while Cuomo re-did all of Cropper's guitar parts.) vocals
- Rivers Cuomo – vocals, guitar; harmonica on "My Name Is Jonas"; Korg synthesizer and handclaps on "Buddy Holly"
- Matt Sharp – bass, vocals
- Patrick Wilson – drums; vocals on "Holiday"

Additional performers

- Mykel Allan – dialogue on "Undone – The Sweater Song"
- Karl Koch – handclaps on "Buddy Holly", dialogue and piano on "Undone – The Sweater Song"

Production

- Ric Ocasek – producer
- Chris Shaw – engineer
- Hal Belknap – assistant engineer
- David Heglmeier – assistant engineer
- Daniel Smith – assistant engineer
- George Marino – mastering
- Peter Gowland – cover photo
- Peter Orth – inside photo
- Karl Koch – design
- Michael Golob – art direction

== Charts ==
=== Weekly ===
Weekly chart performance for Weezer
Chart (1995–96)	Peak position
Austrian Albums (Ö3 Austria)	47
Belgian Albums (Ultratop Flanders)	19
Belgian Albums (Ultratop Wallonia)	40
Canada Top Albums/CDs (RPM)	10
Dutch Albums (Album Top 100)	48
Finnish Albums (Suomen virallinen lista)	22
German Albums (Offizielle Top 100)	61
New Zealand Albums (RMNZ)	6
Norwegian Albums (VG-lista)	35
Swedish Albums (Sverigetopplistan)	8
UK Albums (Official Charts)	23
US Billboard 200	16
US Heatseekers Albums (Billboard)	1

=== Year-end ===
1995 year-end chart performance for Weezer
Chart (1995)	Position
Belgian Albums (Ultratop Flanders)	89
Canada Top Albums/CDs (RPM)	47
Swedish Albums (Sverigetopplistan)	84
US Billboard 200	43

2002 year-end chart performance for Weezer
Chart (2002)	Position
Canadian Alternative Albums (Nielsen SoundScan)	69

=== Singles ===
Year	Song	Peak positions					
Year	Song	US Modern Rock	US Bill- board Hot 100	US Hot 100 Airplay	UK Top 40	Sweden	Nether- lands
1994	"Undone – The Sweater Song"	6	57	74	35	–	–
1994	"Buddy Holly"	2	–	18	12	14	27
1995	"Say It Ain't So"	7	–	51	37	–	–

== Certifications ==
Certifications for Weezer
Region	Certification	Certified units/sales
Canada (Music Canada)	3× Platinum	300,000^{‡}
Denmark (IFPI Danmark)	Platinum	20,000^{‡}
Japan (RIAJ)	Gold	100,000^{^}
New Zealand (RMNZ)	Platinum	15,000^{^}
United Kingdom (BPI)	Gold	100,000^{*}
United States (RIAA)	5× Platinum	5,000,000^{‡}
^{*} Sales figures based on certification alone.^{^} Shipments figures based on certification alone.^{‡} Sales+streaming figures based on certification alone.
