= Chris Shaw (recording engineer) =

American record producer/engineer

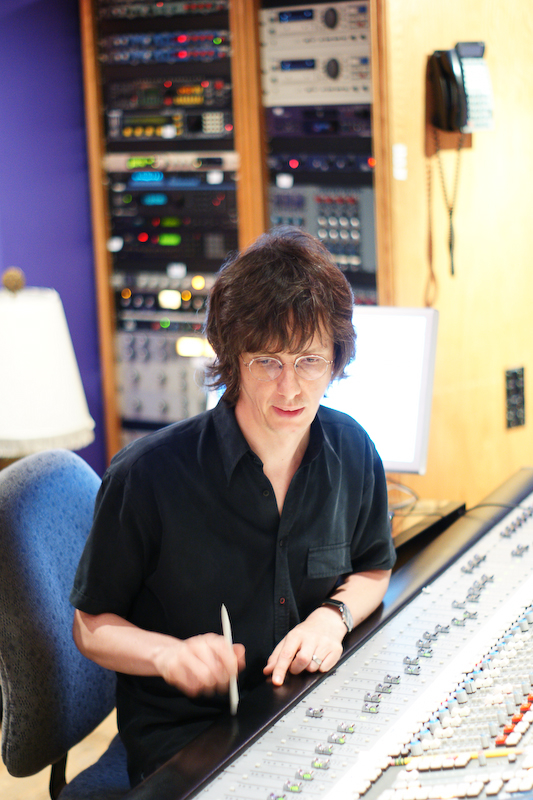
- During the mixing of The Derek Trucks Band's Already Free

Background information
- Born: December 10, 1965 (age 60); The Bronx, New York
- Genres: rock, alternative, hip-hop
- Occupations: record producer, recording engineer, mixer, musician
- Years active: 1980s–present
- Spouse: Melanie Darcey (m. 2002)
- Website: chrisshawmix.com

Chris Shaw is an American record producer, recording engineer, mixer, musician, and four-time Grammy Award winner. Over the course of his career he has worked with a wide range of artists across rock, alternative, and hip-hop genres. Projects he has contributed to have appeared on six albums included in Rolling Stone magazine’s list of the “500 Greatest Albums of All Time.”

== Early life and education ==
Shaw was born on December 10, 1965 to Lawrence D. “Larry” Shaw Jr., a jazz pianist, and Phyliss Maturo Shaw in The Bronx, New York. He is the youngest of the couple's three children, two sons and a daughter. His father's love of playing and listening to music was passed on to his offspring. The household had a large record library. Shaw's dad favored jazz and classical albums, his older brother was a progressive rock buff, while his sister was a pop music fan. All three children played instruments. Chris took up guitar and played in several bands.

As music critic for MIT's student newspaper, Shaw's brother had access to advance copies of new record releases. When he brought home Robert Fripp's Exposure to play for Chris, it would set him on his career path. In particular, the track Water Music I, an otherworldly guitar and spoken word intro to Here Comes the Flood, made a huge impression. The piece features a tape delay/looping technique, known as Frippertronics, that Fripp had developed with Brian Eno.

After seeing a diagram of the setup on the back of Eno's Discreet Music, Shaw attempted to replicate the sound, without Fripp's pricey equipment, using two inexpensive mono tabletop cassette decks. He took apart two cassettes, disposing of the tape from one, and drilled a hole in the left side of one cassette and the right of the other. He ran the tape out of one cassette into the side hole of the other and put them into the two machines, one in record mode, the other in play. In a final step, he took the line out from his guitar amp and put it into the record deck and took the output from the take-up deck and plugged it into the amp. Shaw later described the sound as "awesome," but because the decks ran at different speeds, it would shortly drift out of tune or the tape would snap.

When he graduated high school, Shaw enrolled in the recording program at New York University (NYU).

== Career in music ==
=== Early career ===
Shaw began his career at Greene St. Recording, a New York City hip-hop headquarters, after starting as an intern while attending NYU. Though initially skeptical of fitting in, since his musical sensibilities were so dissimilar stylistically, he discovered they aligned technologically: repeated patterns, sampling, found sounds, music with a strong beat, and lots of sequencing and programming. He progressed from intern to assistant engineer and later became a staff engineer at the studio. During this period, his recording credits include several early influential hip-hop artists, including Public Enemy, A Tribe Called Quest, Run-DMC, and LL Cool J.

In 1991, Shaw performed bass guitar with LL Cool J during the artist’s appearance on MTV Unplugged, which also featured De La Soul, MC Lyte, and A Tribe Called Quest.

=== Production and mixing work ===
After leaving Greene St., Shaw began working independently as a producer, engineer, and mixer. Over the following decades he collaborated with a wide range of artists, including Weezer, Wilco, Bob Dylan, Ween, Jeff Buckley, Soul Asylum, Sheryl Crow, Super Furry Animals, Death Cab for Cutie, Lou Reed, Bad Brains, Ric Ocasek, Cheap Trick, Neon Neon, Elvis Perkins, Guillemots, Joss Stone, The Meat Puppets, Nada Surf, Dashboard Confessional, and The Derek Trucks Band.

Shaw has contributed to albums spanning multiple genres and eras, and has worked on six recordings included in Rolling Stone magazine’s 2023 list (the most recent version) of the “500 Greatest Albums of All Time.” In ascending order of popularity, the albums are Bob Dylan's Love And Theft, Public Enemy's Fear of a Black Planet, Weezer's The Blue Album, Dylan's Modern Times, A Tribe Called Quest's The Low End Theory, and Public Enemy's It Takes a Nation of Millions to Hold Us Back.

=== Working with Bob Dylan ===
In 2000, Dylan hired Shaw based on his prior work with Public Enemy. Their first project together was "Things Have Changed" from the film Wonder Boys. Dylan produced the song himself with Shaw as engineer. Released as a single in May 2000, it won an Academy Award and a Golden Globe for Best Original Song. They followed up with two Dylan-produced albums (under the pseudonym Jack Frost) with Shaw as engineer and mixer, Love and Theft and Modern Times. Both won Grammys.

Since then, Shaw has been part of several more Dylan projects, including the song "Cross The Green Mountain" for the film Gods and Generals, the 2020 album Rough and Rowdy Ways (engineering, mixing), Bob Dylan: The Real Royal Albert Hall 1966 Concert! (mixing, audio restoration). and a number of volumes in the Bootleg Series, collections of rare and previously unreleased material from throughout Dylan's career (mixing, audio restoration).

He also contributed mixes to three Dylan films: No Direction Home, (a Bob Dylan documentary directed by Martin Scorsese); Rolling Thunder Revue: A Bob Dylan Story by Martin Scorsese; and Masked and Anonymous, directed by Larry Charles.

=== Philosophy and approach ===
In an interview for Tape Op magazine, Shaw was asked about his "rules for recording." He briefly summed up his philosophy:

I would rather work with the world's greatest drummer, in the world's worst studio, than the world's worst drummer in the world's greatest studio. It all comes down to the player. People always ask, "How do you get a really great drum sound?" The secret is a really great drummer! Then, after that, it's the drum set, then it's the room and then it's the microphones, console — the last person in the chain is me. Above and beyond the drummer, it's the song and capturing what that song is about. The biggest mistake you can make is not paying attention to what the song is doing. If you're married to your drum sound, but it's not appropriate for the song, then it's the world's worst drum sound.

== Grammy Awards ==
He has been nominated for six Grammys and won four.

| Year | Grammy Ceremony | Album | Artist | Category | Result | Role |
|---|---|---|---|---|---|---|
| 2001 | 44th Grammy Awards | Love and Theft | Bob Dylan | Album of the Year | Nominated | Engineer/mixer |
| | | Love and Theft | Bob Dylan | Best Contemporary Folk Album | Won | Engineer |
| 2004 | 47th Grammy Awards | A Ghost Is Born | Wilco | Best Alternative Music Album | Won | Engineer/mixing contributor |
| 2006 | 49th Grammy Awards | Modern Times | Bob Dylan | Best Contemporary Folk/Americana Album | Won | Engineer/mixing contributor |
| 2009 | 52nd Grammy Awards | Already Free | The Derek Trucks Band | Best Contemporary Blues Album | Won | Engineer/mixer |
| 2024 | 66th Grammy Awards | Fragments – Time Out of Mind Sessions (1996–1997) | Bob Dylan | Best Historical Album | Nominated | Mixer |

== Other work ==
=== Software development ===
Shaw has been a software developer for the SoundFlow automation platform. In 2024, he released a Pro Tools plugin control package called CS Control allowing plug-in control with any standard MIDI controller. He has written popular free scripts on the SoundFlow store.

=== Recording Academy ===
He served as a governor in the Texas chapter of the Recording Academy (NARAS) for five years (2017 - 2022) and served as the committee co-chair of the Producer and Engineers wing.
