= My Name Is Jonas =

1994 song by Weezer

Promotional single by Weezer

from the album Weezer (The Blue Album)
- Released: May 10, 1994
- Recorded: August–September 1993
- Studio: Electric Lady, NYC
- Genre: Alternative rock; power pop
- Length: 3:24
- Label: DGC
- Songwriters: Rivers Cuomo; Patrick Wilson; Jason Cropper
- Producer: Ric Ocasek

"My Name Is Jonas" is a song by the American rock band Weezer. It is the first track on the band's self-titled 1994 debut album, also known as The Blue Album as well as being the only promotional single off of the album. It was written by guitarist/vocalist Rivers Cuomo, drummer Patrick Wilson and guitarist Jason Cropper, and produced by Ric Ocasek. Cropper wrote the song's acoustic intro; it is one of his only Weezer songwriting credits, as he left the band before the release of its first album.

== Background ==
The song was inspired by Cuomo's brother, who was having insurance problems after a serious car crash while at college. According to Cuomo, the song "explains how The Plan is reaming us all, especially my brother."

"My Name Is Jonas" was written in the key of B major. However, as the song is played with guitars tuned a half-step down, it is played as if it were in the key of C.

== Reception ==
Melissa Bobbitt at LiveAbout named "My Name Is Jonas" the seventh best Weezer song, writing that its lyric "the workers are going home" was "a righteous way to kick off a weekend". Michael Gallucci from Diffuser named it the third best Weezer song. In his 2010 book Music: What Happened?, Scott Miller describes the song as "musicality everywhere, theatrical dynamics, little golden lyric details where the subplot reveals the whole mood."

== In other media ==
This song is featured in the video game Guitar Hero III: Legends of Rock as a playable track, and was released as a downloadable song for the Rock Band series and Rocksmith 2014.

== Personnel ==
Personnel taken from Weezer (Blue Album) CD booklet, except where noted.

Weezer

- Brian Bell – guitar (credit only), vocals
- Rivers Cuomo – vocals, guitar, harmonica
- Matt Sharp – bass, vocals
- Patrick Wilson – drums

Production

- Ric Ocasek – producer
- Chris Shaw – engineer
- Hal Belknap - assistant engineer
- David Heglmeirer – assistant engineer
- Daniel Smith – assistant engineer
- George Marino - mastering

== Covers ==
Affinity covered the song on the album Rock Music: A Tribute to Weezer.

In 2021, Taking Back Sunday released a cover of the song as a single.

== Certifications ==
Region	Certification	Certified units/sales
United States (RIAA)	Platinum	1,000,000^{‡}
^{‡} Sales+streaming figures based on certification alone.
