= Pray for the Wicked Tour =

2018–19 concert tour by Panic! at the Disco

- Tour by Panic! at the Disco
- Associated album: Pray for the Wicked
- Start date: July 11, 2018
- End date: October 3, 2019
- Legs: 5
- No. of shows: 84

Panic! at the Disco concert chronology
- Death of a Bachelor Tour (2017); Pray for the Wicked Tour (2018–2019); Viva Las Vengeance Tour (2022–2023)

The Pray for the Wicked Tour was a concert tour by Panic! at the Disco, in support of the project's sixth studio album Pray for the Wicked (2018). The tour began in Minneapolis on July 11, 2018, and concluded in Rio de Janeiro on October 3, 2019. The tour sold over one million tickets. This was also the last Panic! tour where songs off Vices & Virtues were performed.

== Background and development ==
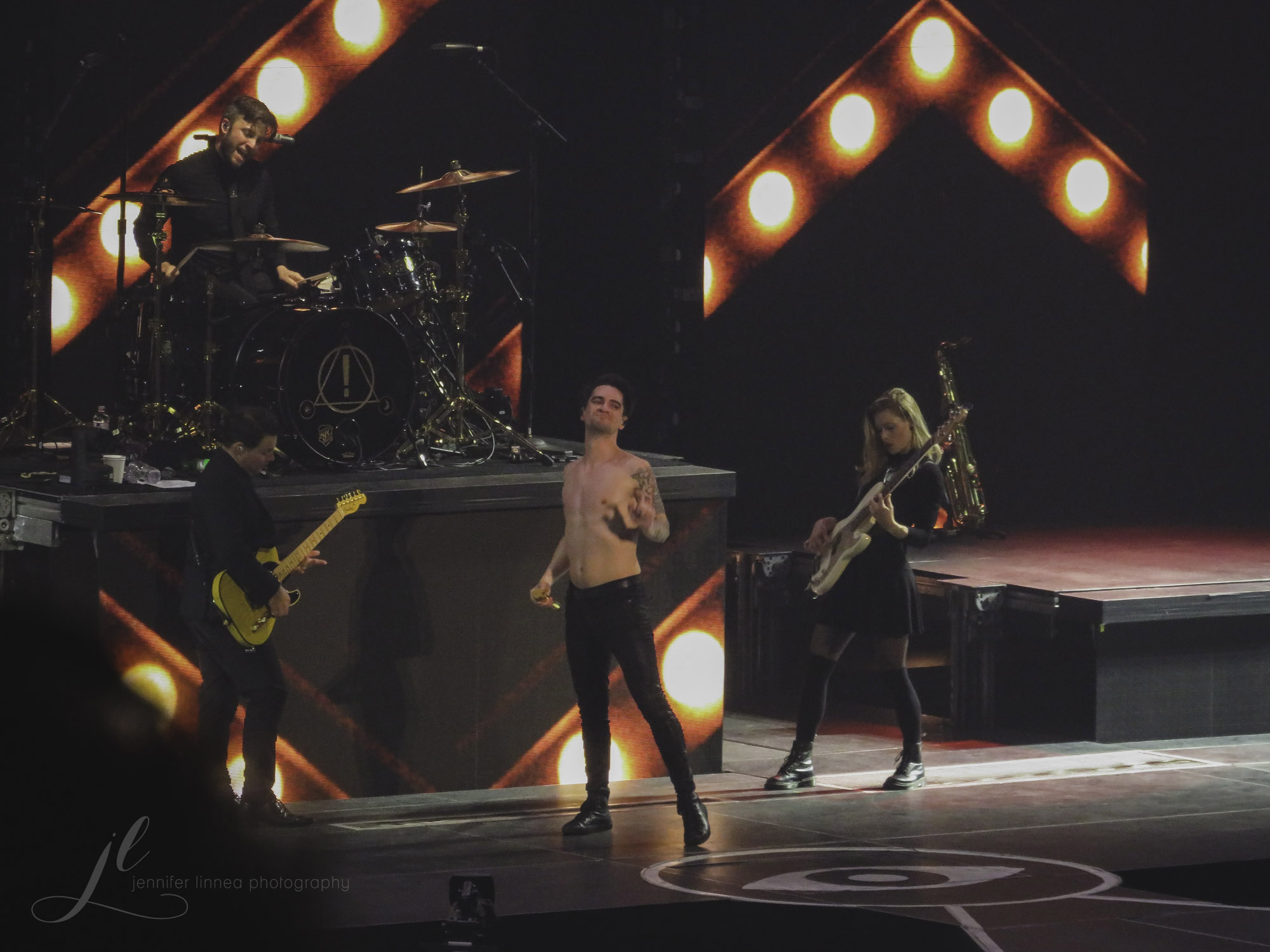
Panic! at the Disco performing at the Pepsi Center during the Pray for the Wicked Tour.

On March 21, 2018, the band released the latest music video for "Say Amen (Saturday Night)" and a new single "(Fuck A) Silver Lining". With the release came the announcement of a summer tour. Arizona and Hayley Kiyoko were announced as the opening acts.

=== Controversy ===
Touring guitarist Kenny Harris officially departed from the band's touring line-up in September 2018. This occurred two days following the surfacing of sexual misconduct claims made against Harris on Twitter. The band said that Harris’ departure was due to "a personal matter" on their Twitter. Harris was replaced by Mike Naran for the remainder of the tour.

== Commercial performance ==
As of March 27, 2019, the "Pray for the Wicked Tour" has totaled $49 million, excluding the European dates yet to be reported, a remarkable 170 percent increase over the Death of a Bachelor Tour's $18.1 million, which was already a giant leap forward from the act's co-headline tour with Weezer and its headline Vices & Virtues Tour.

== Set list ==
The set list was performed on July 11, 2018, in Minneapolis, and is not intended to represent the majority of the shows on the tour.

1. "(Fuck A) Silver Lining"
2. "Don't Threaten Me with a Good Time"
3. "Ready to Go (Get Me Out of My Mind)"
4. "Hey Look Ma, I Made It"
5. "LA Devotee"
6. "Hallelujah"
7. "The Ballad of Mona Lisa"
8. "Nine in the Afternoon"
9. "Golden Days"
10. "Casual Affair"
11. "Vegas Lights"
12. "Dancing's Not a Crime"
13. "This Is Gospel"
14. "Death of a Bachelor"
15. "I Can't Make You Love Me"
16. "Dying in LA"
17. "Girls / Girls / Boys"
18. "Nicotine"
19. "Girls Just Want to Have Fun"
20. "High Hopes"
21. "Miss Jackson"
22. "King of the Clouds"
23. "Crazy=Genius"
24. "Bohemian Rhapsody"
25. "Emperor's New Clothes"

Encore

26. "Say Amen (Saturday Night)"
27. "I Write Sins Not Tragedies"
28. "Victorious"

=== Notes ===
- During the show in Toronto, Hayley Kiyoko joined Urie on stage during the performance of "Girls/Girls/Boys", as she was unable to perform her opening set due to issues getting across the Canadian border.
- During the show in Manchester, a technical glitch temporarily shut down the show in the middle of "Bohemian Rhapsody". However, the fans finished the song with Urie a capella.

== Tour dates ==
Date	City	Country	Venue	Opening act(s)	Attendance	Revenue
North America
July 11, 2018	Minneapolis	United States	Target Center	A R I Z O N A Hayley Kiyoko	12,732 / 12,732	$742,899
July 13, 2018	Indianapolis	United States	Bankers Life Fieldhouse	A R I Z O N A Hayley Kiyoko	12,934 / 12,934	$746,340
July 14, 2018	Detroit	United States	Little Caesars Arena	A R I Z O N A Hayley Kiyoko	16,000 / 16,000	$832,431
July 15, 2018	Columbus	United States	Nationwide Arena	A R I Z O N A Hayley Kiyoko	14,279 / 14,279	$828,299
July 17, 2018	Chicago	United States	United Center	A R I Z O N A Hayley Kiyoko	14,524 / 14,524	$968,318
July 18, 2018	Pittsburgh	United States	PPG Paints Arena	A R I Z O N A Hayley Kiyoko	12,743 / 12,743	$748,467
July 20, 2018	Uniondale	United States	Nassau Coliseum	A R I Z O N A Hayley Kiyoko	11,021 / 11,021	$690,626
July 21, 2018	Baltimore	United States	Royal Farms Arena	A R I Z O N A Hayley Kiyoko	12,202 / 12,202	$744,911
July 22, 2018	Toronto	Canada	Scotiabank Arena	—N/a (Note: A R I Z O N A and Hayley Kiyoko were scheduled to perform but did not due to issues getting across the border.)	13,382 / 13,382	$768,841
July 24, 2018	New York City	United States	Madison Square Garden	A R I Z O N A Hayley Kiyoko	14,608 / 14,608	$961,202
July 25, 2018	Boston	United States	TD Garden	A R I Z O N A Hayley Kiyoko	13,059 / 13,059	$799,178
July 27, 2018	Philadelphia	United States	Wells Fargo Center	A R I Z O N A Hayley Kiyoko	14,769 / 14,769	$933,231
July 28, 2018	Raleigh	United States	PNC Arena	A R I Z O N A Hayley Kiyoko	14,088 / 14,088	$843,493
July 29, 2018	Duluth	United States	Infinite Energy Arena	A R I Z O N A Hayley Kiyoko	10,539 / 10,539	$703,254
July 31, 2018	Sunrise	United States	BB&T Center	A R I Z O N A Hayley Kiyoko	11,521 / 11,521	$612,806
August 1, 2018	Tampa	United States	Amalie Arena	A R I Z O N A Hayley Kiyoko	14,028 / 14,028	$749,165
August 3, 2018	Houston	United States	Toyota Center	A R I Z O N A Hayley Kiyoko	12,496 / 12,496	$791,109
August 4, 2018	Dallas	United States	American Airlines Center	A R I Z O N A Hayley Kiyoko	13,960 / 14,506	$779,057
August 5, 2018	Tulsa	United States	BOK Center	A R I Z O N A Hayley Kiyoko	11,617 / 11,617	$634,092
August 7, 2018	Denver	United States	Pepsi Center	A R I Z O N A Hayley Kiyoko	13,223 / 13,223	$775,079
August 8, 2018	Salt Lake City	United States	Vivint Smart Home Arena	A R I Z O N A Hayley Kiyoko	11,350 / 11,350	$651,787
August 10, 2018	Seattle	United States	KeyArena	A R I Z O N A Hayley Kiyoko	12,117 / 12,117	$700,695
August 11, 2018	Vancouver	Canada	Rogers Arena	A R I Z O N A Hayley Kiyoko	8,805 / 8,805	$497,804
August 12, 2018	Portland	United States	Moda Center	A R I Z O N A Hayley Kiyoko	13,240 / 13,240	$791,330
August 14, 2018	San Jose	United States	SAP Center	A R I Z O N A Hayley Kiyoko	13,823 / 13,823	$741,273
August 15, 2018	Los Angeles	United States	Staples Center	A R I Z O N A Hayley Kiyoko	13,848 / 13,848	$972,676
August 17, 2018	Glendale	United States	Gila River Arena	A R I Z O N A Hayley Kiyoko	13,581 / 13,581	$817,895
August 18, 2018	Las Vegas	United States	T-Mobile Arena	A R I Z O N A Hayley Kiyoko	12,552 / 12,552	$718,447
Europe
August 25, 2018^{[A]}	Reading	England	Little John's Farm	—N/a	—N/a	—N/a
August 26, 2018^{[B]}	Bramham	England	Bramham Park	—N/a	—N/a	—N/a
Oceania
October 6, 2018	Sydney	Australia	Qudos Bank Arena	E^ST	13,150 / 13,546	$850,911
October 9, 2018	Adelaide	Australia	Entertainment Centre Theatre	E^ST	2,926 / 2,926	$177,397
October 11, 2018	Brisbane	Australia	Riverstage	E^ST	8,575 / 8,575	$519,884
October 13, 2018	Melbourne	Australia	Hisense Arena	E^ST	10,907 / 10,907	$661,268
October 16, 2018	Auckland	New Zealand	Spark Arena	Openside	6,337 / 6,337	$401,424
Asia
October 20, 2018	Pasay	Philippines	Mall of Asia Arena	IV of Spades	—N/a	—N/a
October 22, 2018	Tokyo	Japan	Zepp Tokyo	—N/a	—N/a	—N/a
October 23, 2018	Tokyo	Japan	Shinkiba Studio Coast	—N/a	—N/a	—N/a
October 25, 2018	Osaka	Japan	Zepp Osaka Bayside	—N/a	—N/a	—N/a
Latin America
November 17, 2018^{[C]}	Mexico City	Mexico	Autódromo Hermanos Rodríguez	—N/a	—N/a	—N/a
North America
January 10, 2019	Buffalo	United States	KeyBank Center	Two Feet; Betty Who	14,310 / 14,310	$810,443
January 12, 2019	Laval	Canada	Place Bell	Two Feet; Betty Who	8,328 / 8,328	$432,398
January 13, 2019	Manchester	United States	SNHU Arena	Two Feet; Betty Who	9,259 / 9,259	$637,390
January 15, 2019	Albany	United States	Times Union Center	Two Feet; Betty Who	12,071 / 12,071	$640,783
January 16, 2019	Brooklyn	United States	Barclays Center	Two Feet; Betty Who	14,983 / 14,983	$1,053,581
January 18, 2019	Newark	United States	Prudential Center	Two Feet; Betty Who	13,803 / 13,803	$945,692
January 19, 2019	Providence	United States	Dunkin' Donuts Center	Two Feet; Betty Who	10,628 / 10,628	$682,023
January 20, 2019	Washington, D.C.	United States	Capital One Arena	Two Feet; Betty Who	14,888 / 14,888	$1,018,046
January 22, 2019	Charlotte	United States	Spectrum Center	Two Feet; Betty Who	14,987 / 14,987	$934,767
January 23, 2019	Charlottesville	United States	John Paul Jones Arena	Two Feet; Betty Who	12,395 / 12,395	$697,199
January 25, 2019	Nashville	United States	Bridgestone Arena	Two Feet; Betty Who	14,566 / 14,566	$1,020,912
January 26, 2019	Cincinnati	United States	U.S. Bank Arena	Two Feet; Betty Who	12,983 / 12,983	$857,140
January 27, 2019	Milwaukee	United States	Fiserv Forum	Two Feet; Betty Who	12,318 / 12,318	$821,692
January 29, 2019	Grand Rapids	United States	Van Andel Arena	Two Feet; Betty Who	11,142 / 11,142	$650,341
January 30, 2019	Cleveland	United States	Quicken Loans Arena	Two Feet; Betty Who	15,672 / 15,672	$885,600
February 1, 2019	Omaha	United States	CHI Health Center Omaha	Two Feet; Betty Who	14,888 / 14,888	$916,054
February 2, 2019	Kansas City	United States	Sprint Center	Two Feet; Betty Who	14,237 / 14,237	$905,338
February 4, 2019	Rosemont	United States	Allstate Arena	Two Feet; Betty Who	13,653 / 13,653	$998,960
February 5, 2019	St. Louis	United States	Enterprise Center	Two Feet; Betty Who	14,636 / 14,636	$921,028
February 6, 2019	Memphis	United States	FedExForum	Two Feet; Betty Who	10,974 / 10,974	$623,538
February 8, 2019	Austin	United States	Frank Erwin Center	Two Feet; Betty Who	12,808 / 12,808	$849,616
February 9, 2019	New Orleans	United States	Smoothie King Center	Two Feet; Betty Who	13,804 / 13,804	$920,551
February 12, 2019	Albuquerque	United States	Tingley Coliseum	Two Feet; Betty Who	7,543 / 7,543	$512,692
February 14, 2019	Anaheim	United States	Honda Center	Two Feet; Betty Who	12,481 / 12,481	$946,688
February 15, 2019	Inglewood	United States	The Forum	Two Feet; Conan Gray	14,611 / 14,611	$1,080,270
February 16, 2019	San Diego	United States	Pechanga Arena	Two Feet; Conan Gray	10,684 / 10,684	$660,378
February 19, 2019	Oakland	United States	Oracle Arena	Two Feet; Conan Gray	13,273 / 13,273	$775,903
February 20, 2019	Sacramento	United States	Golden 1 Center	Two Feet; Conan Gray	14,012 / 14,012	$925,668
March 3, 2019 ^{[D]}	Houston	United States	NRG Stadium	—N/a	—N/a	—N/a
Europe
March 18, 2019	Amsterdam	Netherlands	AFAS Live	A R I Z O N A	5,915 / 5,915	$262,568
March 19, 2019	Paris	France	Zénith Paris	A R I Z O N A	6,413 / 6,413	$291,974
March 21, 2019	Antwerp	Belgium	Lotto Arena	A R I Z O N A	7,155 / 7,155	$276,272
March 24, 2019	Glasgow	Scotland	SSE Hydro	A R I Z O N A MØ	13,002 / 13,002	$752,033
March 25, 2019	Cardiff	Wales	Motorpoint Arena Cardiff	A R I Z O N A MØ	7,078 / 7,078	$420,410
March 26, 2019	Birmingham	England	Arena Birmingham	A R I Z O N A MØ	15,300 / 15,300	$917,986
March 28, 2019	London	England	The O_{2} Arena	A R I Z O N A MØ	36,078 / 37,236	$2,192,330
March 29, 2019	London	England	The O_{2} Arena	A R I Z O N A MØ	36,078 / 37,236	$2,192,330
March 30, 2019	Manchester	England	Manchester Arena	A R I Z O N A MØ	15,771 / 15,771	$892,238
April 1, 2019 (Note: The concert on April 1, 2019 in Düsseldorf was originally planned to take place on March 16, 2019 at Mitsubishi Electric Halle, but was rescheduled due to high demand.)	Düsseldorf	Germany	ISS Dome	A R I Z O N A	10,973 / 10,973	$492,341
April 3, 2019 (Note: The concert on April 3, 2019 in Berlin was originally planned to take place on March 15, 2019 at Columbiahalle, but was rescheduled due to high demand.)	Berlin	Germany	Mercedes-Benz Arena	A R I Z O N A	8,073 / 8,073	$362,223
April 4, 2019 (Note: The concert on April 4, 2019 in Hamburg was originally planned to take place on March 14, 2019 at Stadthalle Offenbach in Offenbach, but was rescheduled due to high demand.)	Hamburg	Germany	Barclaycard Arena	A R I Z O N A	7,103 / 7,103	$330,742
North America
June 21, 2019^{[G]}	Dover	United States	Dover International Speedway	—N/a	—N/a	—N/a
September 14, 2019^{[F]}	Atlanta	United States	Piedmont Park	—N/a	—N/a	—N/a
Latin America
October 3, 2019 ^{[I]}	Rio de Janeiro	Brazil	Barra Olympic Park	—N/a	—N/a	—N/a
Total					884,584 / 897,734 (98%)	$52,657,305

Festivals and other miscellaneous performances
^{A} This concert is a part of the Reading Festival
^{B} This concert is a part of the Leeds Festival
^{C} This concert is a part of Corona Capital
^{D} This concert is a part of Riptide Music festival.
^{E} This concert is a part of 97X Next Big Thing festival.
^{F} This concert is a part of Houston Livestock Show and Rodeo
^{G} This concert is a part of Firefly Music Festival
^{H} This concert is a part of Music Midtown festival.
^{I} This concert is a part of Rock in Rio festival.

== Personnel ==
- Brendon Urie – lead vocals, guitar, keyboards
- Dan Pawlovich – drums, percussion, backing vocals
- Nicole Row – bass guitar, keyboards, backing vocals
- Kenneth Harris – lead guitar, backing vocals, keyboards (July 11, 2018 – August 26, 2018)
- Mike Naran – lead guitar, backing vocals, keyboards (October 6, 2018 – October 3, 2019)
