= All My Friends We're Glorious =

All My Friends We're Glorious: Death of a Bachelor Tour Live

Live album by Panic! at the Disco
- Released: December 15, 2017
- Recorded: April 14, 2017
- Venue: Amway Center in Orlando, Florida
- Length: 87:06
- Label: Fueled by Ramen

Panic! at the Disco chronology
Death of a Bachelor (2016)	All My Friends We're Glorious: Death of a Bachelor Tour Live (2017)	Pray for the Wicked (2018)

All My Friends We're Glorious: Death of a Bachelor Tour Live (or simply All My Friends We're Glorious) is the fourth live album by Panic! at the Disco and their only live album as a solo project, fronted by Brendon Urie. It was released on December 15, 2017, in digital versions and as a limited edition double vinyl LP, and documents the band's 2017 Death of a Bachelor Tour concert tour following the release of their fifth album, Death of a Bachelor.

Recorded in April 2017, at the Amway Center in Orlando, Florida, video footage from the show was uploaded to the band's YouTube channel. The album debuted at #185 on the Billboard 200.

== Track listing ==
The album comprises 21 tracks from the tour, and the band simultaneously released live concert footage of each track.

No.	Title	Writer(s)	Original release	Length
1.	"Don't Threaten Me with a Good Time"	Jonathan Rotem, Teal Douville, Carl Lehman, Jerker Hansson, Brendon Urie, Jake Sinclair, Amir Salem, Catherine Pierson, Frederick Schneider, Julian Strickland, Cynthia Wilson, Rick Wilson	Death of a Bachelor (2016)	4:45
2.	"LA Devotee"	Urie, White Sea, Sinclair	Death of a Bachelor	3:16
3.	"Ready to Go (Get Me Out of My Mind)"	Urie, Spencer Smith	Vices & Virtues (2011)	3:52
4.	"Golden Days"	Urie, Sam Hollander, Sinclair	Death of a Bachelor	4:15
5.	"Vegas Lights"	Urie, Dallon Weekes, Butch Walker	Too Weird to Live, Too Rare to Die! (2013)	3:19
6.	"A Fever You Can't Sweat Out Medley"	Ryan Ross, Urie, Smith	A Fever You Can't Sweat Out (2005)	4:30
7.	"Hallelujah"	Urie, Aron Wright, Imad Royal, White Sea, Sinclair, Robert William Lamm	Death of a Bachelor	3:57
8.	"Nine in the Afternoon"	Jon Walker, Urie, Ross, Smith	Pretty. Odd. (2008)	3:10
9.	"Miss Jackson"	Urie, Butch Walker, Sinclair, Salem, Lauren Pritchard, Alex Goose	Too Weird to Live, Too Rare to Die!	6:17
10.	"This Is Gospel"	Urie, Weekes, Sinclair	Too Weird to Live, Too Rare to Die!	3:17
11.	"Death of a Bachelor"	Urie, Pritchard, Sinclair	Death of a Bachelor	3:27
12.	"The Ballad of Mona Lisa"	Urie, Smith, B. Walker, John Feldmann	Vices & Virtues	4:45
13.	"Movin' Out (Anthony's Song)" (Billy Joel cover)	Billy Joel	The Stranger (1977)	4:12
14.	"Emperor's New Clothes"	Urie, Sinclair, Pritchard, Hollander, Dan Wilson	Death of a Bachelor	3:09
15.	"Nicotine"	Urie, Weekes, Salem	Too Weird to Live, Too Rare to Die!	3:40
16.	"Crazy=Genius"	Urie, Hollander, Sinclair	Death of a Bachelor	3:56
17.	"Let's Kill Tonight"	Urie, Smith	Vices & Virtues	3:16
18.	"Girls / Girls / Boys"	Urie, Weekes	Too Weird to Live, Too Rare to Die!	4:52
19.	"Bohemian Rhapsody" (Queen cover)	Freddie Mercury	A Night at the Opera (1975)	7:04
20.	"I Write Sins Not Tragedies"	Urie, Ross, Smith	A Fever You Can't Sweat Out	4:04
21.	"Victorious"	Urie, Christopher J. Baran, Mike Viola, White Sea, Sinclair, Alex DeLeon, Rivers Cuomo	Death of a Bachelor	3:54
Total length:				87:06

Notes

- "A Fever You Can't Sweat Out Medley" consists of "The Only Difference Between Martyrdom and Suicide Is Press Coverage", "Camisado" and "But It's Better If You Do".

== Personnel ==
Panic! at the Disco

- Brendon Urie – lead vocals, rhythm guitars, piano

Additional personnel

- Dallon Weekes – bass, backing vocals
- Dan Pawlovich – drums, percussion, backing vocals
- Kenneth Harris – lead guitars, backing vocals
