= Viva Las Vengeance Tour =

2022–23 concert tour by Panic! at the Disco

- Tour by Panic! at the Disco
- Location: Europe; North America
- Associated album: Viva Las Vengeance
- Start date: September 8, 2022
- End date: March 10, 2023
- Legs: 2
- No. of shows: 38
- Supporting acts: Beach Bunny; Jake Wesley Rogers; Marina; Fletcher

Panic! at the Disco concert chronology
- Pray for the Wicked Tour (2018–2019); Viva Las Vengeance Tour (2022–2023)

The Viva Las Vengeance Tour was the final concert tour by American pop rock band Panic! at the Disco. The tour supported the project's seventh and final studio album Viva Las Vengeance. The tour began on September 8, 2022, at the Moody Center in Austin, Texas, and concluded on March 10, 2023, at the AO Arena in Manchester, England. The tour was promoted by Live Nation Entertainment and Crush Management.

On January 24, 2023, frontman Brendon Urie announced that Panic! would be discontinued following the end of the tour, in order to focus on his family.

== Set list ==
This set list is representative of the show on February 20, 2023, in Vienna, Austria and may not be representative of all shows on the tour.

1. "Say Amen (Saturday Night)"
2. "Hey Look Ma, I Made It"
3. "Don't Threaten Me with a Good Time"
4. "This Is Gospel"
5. "Miss Jackson"
6. "Emperor's New Clothes"
7. "Viva Las Vengeance"
8. "Middle of a Breakup"
9. "Don't Let the Light Go Out"
10. "Local God"
11. "Star Spangled Banger"
12. "God Killed Rock and Roll"
13. "Say It Louder"
14. "Sugar Soaker"
15. "Something About Maggie"
16. "Sad Clown"
17. "All by Yourself"
18. "Do It to Death"
19. "Girls / Girls / Boys"
20. "House of Memories"
21. "Nine in the Afternoon"
22. "Death of a Bachelor"
23. "I Write Sins Not Tragedies"
24. "Victorious"
25. "High Hopes"

== Tour dates ==
List of 2022 concerts
Date (2022)	City	Country	Venue	Opening act(s)
September 8	Austin	United States	Moody Center	Beach Bunny; Jake Wesley Rogers
September 10	Houston	United States	Toyota Center	Beach Bunny; Jake Wesley Rogers
September 11	Fort Worth	United States	Dickies Arena	Beach Bunny; Jake Wesley Rogers
September 13	Kansas City	United States	T-Mobile Center	Beach Bunny; Jake Wesley Rogers
September 14	Saint Paul	United States	Xcel Energy Center	Beach Bunny; Jake Wesley Rogers
September 20	Detroit	United States	Little Caesars Arena	Marina; Jake Wesley Rogers
September 21	Columbus	United States	Nationwide Arena	Marina; Jake Wesley Rogers
September 23	New York City	United States	Madison Square Garden	Marina; Jake Wesley Rogers
September 28	Boston	United States	TD Garden	Marina; Jake Wesley Rogers
September 30	Philadelphia	United States	Wells Fargo Center	Marina; Jake Wesley Rogers
October 1	Washington, D.C.	United States	Capital One Arena	Marina; Jake Wesley Rogers
October 2	Raleigh	United States	PNC Arena	Marina; Jake Wesley Rogers
October 4	Sunrise	United States	FLA Live Arena	Marina; Jake Wesley Rogers
October 5	Tampa	United States	Amalie Arena	Marina; Jake Wesley Rogers
October 7	Duluth	United States	Gas South Arena	Marina; Jake Wesley Rogers
October 8	Nashville	United States	Bridgestone Arena	Marina; Jake Wesley Rogers
October 9	St. Louis	United States	Enterprise Center	Marina; Little Image
October 11	Denver	United States	Ball Arena	Marina; Jake Wesley Rogers
October 13	Salt Lake City	United States	Vivint Arena	Marina; Jake Wesley Rogers
October 15	Portland	United States	Moda Center	Marina; Jake Wesley Rogers
October 16	Seattle	United States	Climate Pledge Arena	Marina; Little Image
October 19	Inglewood	United States	Kia Forum	Marina; Jake Wesley Rogers
October 21	Paradise	United States	T-Mobile Arena	Marina; Jake Wesley Rogers
October 23	Phoenix	United States	Footprint Center	Marina; Jake Wesley Rogers
October 25	San Francisco	United States	Chase Center	Marina; Jake Wesley Rogers
October 28	Chicago	United States	United Center	Marina; Jake Wesley Rogers

List of 2023 concerts
Date (2023)	City	Country	Venue	Opening act(s)
February 20	Vienna	Austria	Wiener Stadthalle	Fletcher
February 21	Munich	Germany	Olympiahalle	Fletcher
February 23	Hamburg	Germany	Barclays Arena	Fletcher
February 24	Cologne	Germany	Lanxess Arena	Fletcher
February 25	Rotterdam	Netherlands	Rotterdam Ahoy	Fletcher
February 28	Antwerp	Belgium	Sportpaleis	Fletcher
March 1	Paris	France	Accor Arena	Fletcher
March 3	Glasgow	Scotland	OVO Hydro	Fletcher
March 4	Birmingham	England	Utilita Arena	Fletcher
March 6	London	England	The O_{2} Arena	Fletcher
March 7	London	England	The O_{2} Arena	Fletcher
March 10	Manchester	England	AO Arena	Fletcher

=== Cancelled dates ===
List of cancelled concerts showing date, city, country, venue, and reason for cancellation
Date (2022)	City	Country	Venue	Reason
September 16	Milwaukee	United States	Fiserv Forum	Positive COVID-19 test in a crew member
September 25	Toronto	Canada	Scotiabank Arena	Logistical issues
September 27	Montreal	Canada	Bell Centre	Logistical issues

== Personnel ==
- Brendon Urie – lead vocals, guitar, keyboards, percussion
- Dan Pawlovich – drums, percussion, backing vocals
- Chris Bautista – trumpet
- Erm Navarro – trombone
- Jesse Molloy – saxophone
- Nicole Row – bass guitar, backing vocals
- Mike Naran – guitar
- Kiara Ana Perico – viola
- Leah Metzler – cello
- Michelle Shin – violin
