= Summer Tour 2016 (Weezer and Panic! at the Disco) =

2016 concert tour

- Tour by Weezer and Panic! at the Disco
- Promotional poster for the tour
- Associated albums: Weezer (White Album); Death of a Bachelor
- Start date: June 10, 2016
- End date: August 6, 2016
- Legs: 1
- No. of shows: 42
Weezer tour chronology
Everything Will Be Alright in the End Tour (2014)	Summer Tour 2016 (2016)	Feels like Summer Tour (2017)
Panic! at the Disco tour chronology
The Gospel Tour (2014)	Summer Tour 2016 (2016)	Death of a Bachelor Tour (2017)

Summer Tour 2016 was a co-headlining concert tour by American rock bands Weezer and Panic! at the Disco, supporting their respective albums, the White Album and Death of a Bachelor. Beginning June 2016, the bands played over 40 shows in North America.

== Opening acts ==
- Andrew McMahon and the Wilderness
- Swimming with Bears (Corpus Christi)
- Atlas Genius (Oklahoma City, Brandon, Chula Vista)

== Set lists ==
The following setlists were obtained from the concert held July 2, 2016; at the PNC Bank Arts Center in Holmdel Township, New Jersey. It is not representative of all concerts for the duration of the tour.

Weezer

1. "California Kids"
2. "Hash Pipe"
3. "My Name Is Jonas"
4. "(If You're Wondering If I Want You To) I Want You To"
5. "Jacked Up"
6. "Pork and Beans"
7. "L.A. Girlz"
8. "Perfect Situation"
9. "Thank God for Girls"
10. "Beverly Hills"
11. "Dope Nose"
12. "Back to the Shack" / "Keep Fishin'" / "The Good Life"
13. "Surf Wax America"
14. "Undone – The Sweater Song"
15. "King of the World" / "Only in Dreams"
16. "Island in the Sun"
17. "Say It Ain't So"
18. "El Scorcho"

Encore

19. "Buddy Holly"

Panic! at the Disco

1. "Don't Threaten Me with a Good Time"
2. "Vegas Lights"
3. "The Ballad of Mona Lisa"
4. "Hallelujah"
5. "Time to Dance"
6. "Emperor's New Clothes"
7. "Girls / Girls / Boys"
8. "Ready to Go (Get Me Out of My Mind)"
9. "Nine in the Afternoon"
10. "Crazy=Genius"
11. "Miss Jackson"
12. "Golden Days"
13. "Bohemian Rhapsody"
14. "LA Devotee"
15. "Death of a Bachelor"

Encore

16. "I Write Sins Not Tragedies"
17. "This is Gospel"
18. "Victorious"

== Tour dates ==
Date	City	Country	Venue
June 10, 2016	The Woodlands	United States	Cynthia Woods Mitchell Pavilion
June 11, 2016	Corpus Christi	United States	Old Concrete Street Amphitheater
June 12, 2016	New Orleans	United States	Bold Sphere Music
June 14, 2016	Miami	United States	Klipsch Amphitheatre
June 15, 2016	Tampa	United States	MidFlorida Credit Union Amphitheatre
June 16, 2016	Atlanta	United States	Lakewood Amphitheatre
June 19, 2016	Charleston	United States	Volvo Cars Stadium
June 20, 2016	Charlotte	United States	PNC Music Pavilion
June 21, 2016	Raleigh	United States	Coastal Credit Union Music Park
June 22, 2016	Virginia Beach	United States	Veterans United Home Loans Amphitheater
June 24, 2016	Bristow	United States	Jiffy Lube Live
June 25, 2016	Hopewell	United States	CB-MS Performing Arts Center
June 26, 2016^{[A]}	Scranton	United States	The Pavilion at Montage Mountain
June 28, 2016	Gilford	United States	Bank of New Hampshire Pavilion
June 30, 2016	Wantagh	United States	Nikon at Jones Beach Theater
July 1, 2016	Mansfield	United States	Xfinity Center
July 2, 2016	Holmdel	United States	PNC Bank Arts Center
July 3, 2016^{[B]}	Pittsburgh	United States	Stage AE
July 5, 2016	Camden	United States	BB&T Pavilion
July 6, 2016	Toronto	Canada	Molson Canadian Amphitheatre
July 8, 2016	Clarkston	United States	DTE Energy Music Theatre
July 9, 2016^{[C]}	Milwaukee	United States	Marcus Amphitheater
July 10, 2016	Tinley Park	United States	Hollywood Casino Amphitheatre
July 12, 2016	Noblesville	United States	Klipsch Music Center
July 13, 2016	Nashville	United States	Ascend Amphitheater
July 15, 2016	Dallas	United States	Gexa Energy Pavilion
July 16, 2016	Oklahoma City	United States	Oklahoma Zoo Amphitheater
July 17, 2016	Rogers	United States	Walmart Arkansas Music Pavilion
July 19, 2016	Maryland Heights	United States	Hollywood Casino Amphitheatre
July 20, 2016	Kansas City	United States	Starlight Theatre
July 22, 2016^{[D]}	Brandon	United States	Badlands Motor Speedway
July 23, 2016	Council Bluffs	United States	Stir Concert Cove
July 24, 2016	Greenwood Village	United States	Fiddler's Green Amphitheatre
July 26, 2016	West Valley City	United States	USANA Amphitheatre
July 28, 2016	Burnaby	Canada	Festival Lawn
July 29, 2016	Redmond	United States	Marymoor Park Concert Venue
July 30, 2016	Troutdale	United States	McMenamins Edgefield Amphitheater
July 31, 2016	Mountain View	United States	Shoreline Amphitheatre
August 2, 2016	Phoenix	United States	Ak-Chin Pavilion
August 3, 2016	Chula Vista	United States	Sleep Train Amphitheatre
August 5, 2016	Santa Barbara	United States	Santa Barbara Bowl
August 6, 2016	Irvine	United States	Irvine Meadows Amphitheatre

Festivals and other miscellaneous performances
^{A} 92.1 Fuzz Fest
^{B} X-Fest
^{C} Summerfest
^{D} Chuck's Kegger

=== Box office score data ===
Venue	City	Tickets sold / available	Gross revenue
Volvo Cars Stadium	Charleston	7,206 / 7,549 (95%)	$318,732
Bank of New Hampshire Pavilion	Gilford	6,317 / 7,843 (81%)	$291,477
Xfinity Center	Mansfield	18,589 / 19,887 (93%)	$487,517
PNC Bank Arts Center	Holmdel Township	16,641 / 16,933 (98%)	$515,438
BB&T Pavilion	Camden	18,249 / 25,445 (72%)	$513,150
DTE Energy Music Theatre	Clarkston	14,929 / 15,192 (98%)	$438,102
Hollywood Casino Amphitheatre	Tinley Park	24,610 / 28,630 (86%)	$714,624
Klipsch Music Center	Noblesville	19,334 / 21,260 (91%)	$481,086
Gexa Energy Pavilion	Dallas	17,622 / 20,102 (88%)	$503,385
USANA Amphitheatre	West Valley City	19,006 / 20,006 (95%)	$452,753
Shoreline Amphitheatre	Mountain View	22,272 / 22,542 (99%)	$571,739
TOTAL		184,775 / 205,389 (90%)	$5,288,003
