= Death of a Bachelor Tour =

2017 concert tour by Panic! at the Disco

- Tour by Panic! at the Disco
- Promotional poster for the tour
- Associated album: Death of a Bachelor
- Start date: February 24, 2017
- End date: April 15, 2017
- Legs: 1
- No. of shows: 36

Panic! at the Disco concert chronology
- Weezer & Panic! at the Disco Summer Tour 2016 (2016); Death of a Bachelor Tour (2017); Pray for the Wicked Tour (2018–2019)

The Death of a Bachelor Tour was a concert tour by Panic! at the Disco, in support of the group's fifth studio album Death of a Bachelor (2016). The tour began in Uncasville at the Mohegan Sun Arena on February 24, 2017, and concluded on April 15, 2017, in Sunrise at the BB&T Center. Adding gross estimates from those concerts yet to be reported, the overall box office take was about $17 million when the tour closed. About 350,000 fans saw the Death of a Bachelor Tour during its run.

== Background and development ==
On September 22, 2016, the band released the latest music video for "LA Devotee". With the release came the announcement of an arena tour in 2017. MisterWives and Saint Motel were announced as the opening acts.

== Set list ==
This set list is representative of the show on February 25, 2017 in Philadelphia. It is not representative of all concerts for the duration of the tour.

1. "Don't Threaten Me with a Good Time"
2. "LA Devotee"
3. "Ready to Go (Get Me Out of My Mind)"
4. "Golden Days"
5. "Vegas Lights"
6. "The Only Difference Between Martyrdom and Suicide Is Press Coverage" / "Camisado" / "But It's Better If You Do"
7. "Hallelujah"
8. "Nine in the Afternoon"
9. "Miss Jackson"
10. "This Is Gospel"
11. "Death of a Bachelor"
12. "The Ballad of Mona Lisa"
13. "Movin' Out (Anthony's Song)"
14. "Emperor's New Clothes"
15. "Nicotine"
16. "Crazy=Genius"
17. "Let's Kill Tonight"
18. "24K Magic" / "Bitch Better Have My Money"
19. "Girls / Girls / Boys"
20. "Bohemian Rhapsody"

Encore

21. "I Write Sins Not Tragedies"
22. "Victorious"

== Tour dates ==
List of concerts, showing date, city, country, venue, opening acts, tickets sold, number of available tickets and amount of gross revenue
Date	City	Country	Venue	Opening acts	Attendance	Revenue
February 24, 2017	Uncasville	United States	Mohegan Sun Arena	MisterWives; Saint Motel	6,528 / 6,528	$361,536
February 25, 2017	Philadelphia	United States	Wells Fargo Center	MisterWives; Saint Motel	—N/a	—N/a
February 26, 2017	Portland	United States	Cross Insurance Arena	MisterWives; Saint Motel	—N/a	—N/a
February 28, 2017	Pittsburgh	United States	Petersen Events Center	MisterWives; Saint Motel	—N/a	—N/a
March 2, 2017	New York City	United States	Madison Square Garden	MisterWives; Saint Motel	14,468 / 14,468	$816,524
March 3, 2017	Oxon Hill	United States	MGM National Harbor Theater	MisterWives; Saint Motel	3,840 / 3,983	$194,202
March 4, 2017	Worcester	United States	DCU Center	MisterWives; Saint Motel	10,628 / 10,872	$510,919
March 7, 2017	Columbus	United States	Schottenstein Center	MisterWives; Saint Motel	12,266 / 12,895	$555,057
March 8, 2017	Cleveland	United States	Wolstein Center	MisterWives; Saint Motel	9,772 / 10,021	$392,049
March 10, 2017	Auburn Hills	United States	The Palace of Auburn Hills	MisterWives; Saint Motel	14,023 / 14,170	$666,423
March 11, 2017	Rosemont	United States	Allstate Arena	MisterWives; Saint Motel	12,463 / 12,933	$642,656
March 12, 2017	Saint Paul	United States	Xcel Energy Center	MisterWives; Saint Motel	13,155 / 13,515	$614,715
March 14, 2017	Des Moines	United States	Wells Fargo Arena	MisterWives; Saint Motel	7,878 / 8,037	$334,804
March 15, 2017	Omaha	United States	Baxter Arena	MisterWives; Saint Motel	6,855 / 7,084	$298,924
March 17, 2017	Denver	United States	Pepsi Center	MisterWives; Saint Motel	13,163 / 14,075	$629,983
March 18, 2017	Orem	United States	UCCU Center	MisterWives; Saint Motel	6,246 / 8,366	$303,685
March 19, 2017	Boise	United States	Taco Bell Arena	MisterWives; Saint Motel	—N/a	—N/a
March 21, 2017	Seattle	United States	WaMu Theater	MisterWives; Saint Motel	7,057 / 7,200	$323,767
March 22, 2017	Portland	United States	Moda Center	MisterWives	11,104 / 11,294	$464,822
March 24, 2017	Las Vegas	United States	Mandalay Bay Events Center	MisterWives	8,845 / 8,845	$463,599
March 25, 2017	Oakland	United States	Oracle Arena	MisterWives; Saint Motel	13,505 / 13,804	$625,785
March 26, 2017	San Diego	United States	Viejas Arena	Saint Motel	8,779 / 9,238	$434,168
March 28, 2017	Inglewood	United States	The Forum	MisterWives; Saint Motel	13,446 / 13,446	$647,541
March 29, 2017	Phoenix	United States	Talking Stick Resort Arena	MisterWives; Saint Motel	11,990 / 11,990	$469,606
March 31, 2017	Allen	United States	Allen Event Center	MisterWives; Saint Motel	6,271 / 6,432	$343,639
April 1, 2017	Houston	United States	Toyota Center	MisterWives; Saint Motel	12,040 / 12,040	$629,559
April 2, 2017	Austin	United States	Frank Erwin Center	MisterWives; Saint Motel	10,634 / 10,634	$521,837
April 4, 2017	Tulsa	United States	BOK Center	MisterWives; Saint Motel	—N/a	—N/a
April 5, 2017	St. Louis	United States	Scottrade Center	MisterWives; Saint Motel	—N/a	—N/a
April 7, 2017	Birmingham	United States	Legacy Arena	MisterWives; Saint Motel	—N/a	—N/a
April 8, 2017	Memphis	United States	FedExForum	MisterWives; Saint Motel	—N/a	—N/a
April 9, 2017	Louisville	United States	KFC Yum! Center	MisterWives; Saint Motel	—N/a	—N/a
April 11, 2017	Greensboro	United States	Greensboro Coliseum	MisterWives; Saint Motel	—N/a	—N/a
April 12, 2017	Duluth	United States	Infinite Energy Arena	MisterWives; Saint Motel	9,884 / 9,884	$526,883
April 14, 2017	Orlando	United States	Amway Center	MisterWives; Saint Motel	—N/a	—N/a
April 15, 2017	Sunrise	United States	BB&T Center	MisterWives; Saint Motel	—N/a	—N/a
Total					234,956 / 251,754 (93%)	$11,772,683
