= Panic! at the Disco =

American pop rock band

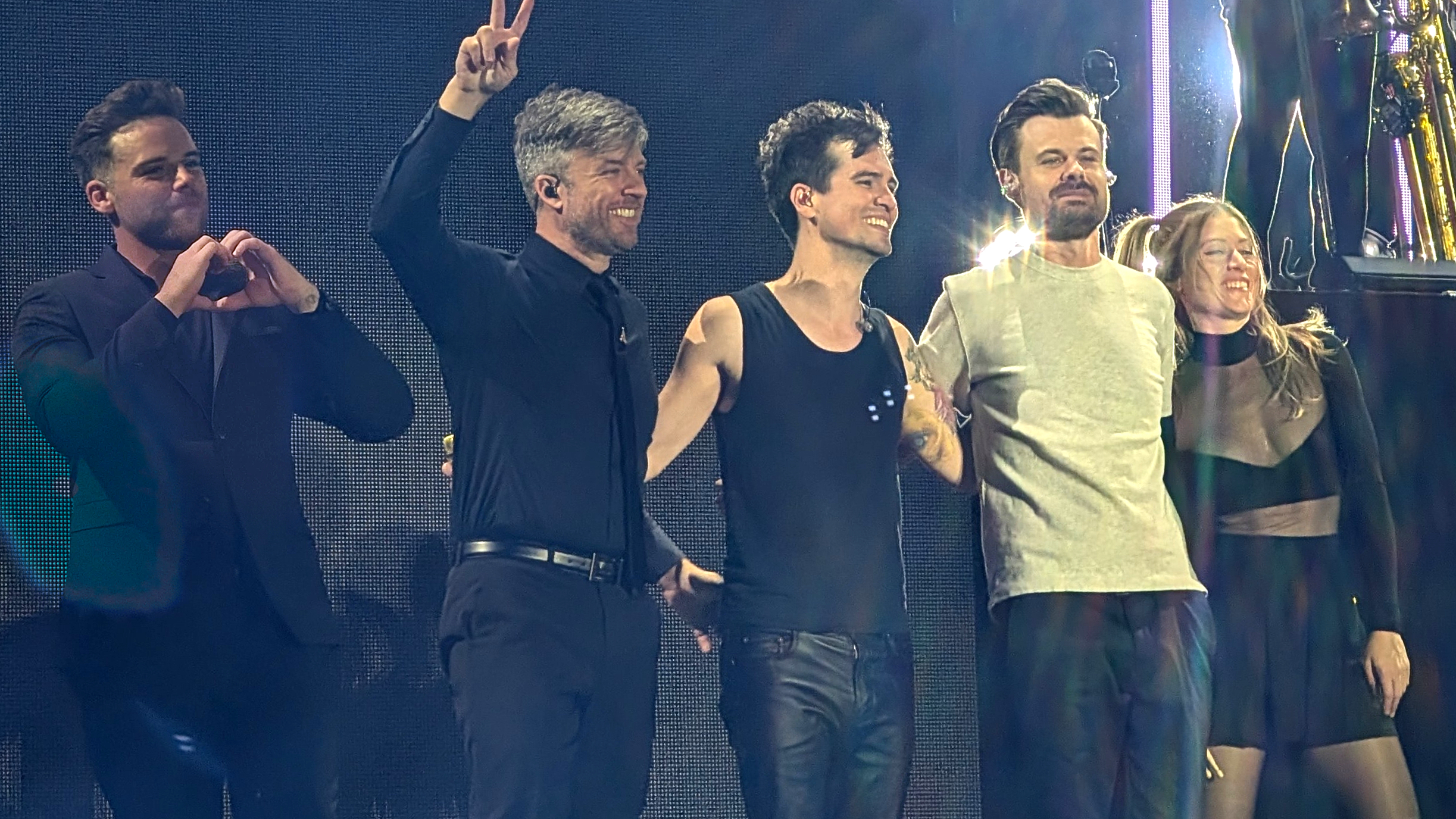
- Panic! at the Disco at When We Were Young 2025. From left to right: Mike Naran, Dan Pawlovich, Brendon Urie, Spencer Smith, and Nicole Row.

Background information
- Also known as: Panic at the Disco (2008–2009)
- Origin: Las Vegas, Nevada, U.S.
- Genres: Pop rock; baroque pop; electropop; alternative rock; pop-punk; emo
- Works: Discography
- Years active: 2004–2023 (Note: Panic! at the Disco briefly reunited in 2025 to perform at the When We Were Young festival.)
- Labels: DCD2; Fueled by Ramen
- Spinoffs: The Young Veins
- Past members: Ryan Ross; Spencer Smith; Brent Wilson; Brendon Urie; Jon Walker; Dallon Weekes
- Website: panicatthedisco.com

Panic! at the Disco (Note: Usually abbreviated as P!ATD. The band went by Panic at the Disco with no exclamation point for the duration of the Pretty. Odd. album campaign from January 2008 to July 2009.) was an American pop rock band formed in Las Vegas, Nevada, in 2004 by high school friends Ryan Ross (guitar, vocals) and Spencer Smith (drums), who recruited classmates Brendon Urie (vocals, guitar) and Brent Wilson (bass). Following several lineup changes, Panic! at the Disco operated as the solo project of frontman Urie from 2015 until its discontinuation in 2023.

The band recorded their first demos while they were in high school. Shortly after, they recorded and released their debut studio album, A Fever You Can't Sweat Out (2005). Popularized by the second single, "I Write Sins Not Tragedies", which was certified diamond in the US, the album was certified quadruple platinum in the US. In 2006, Wilson was fired from the band during an extensive world tour and subsequently replaced by Jon Walker. The band's second album, Pretty. Odd. (2008), was preceded by the single "Nine in the Afternoon". The album marked a significant departure from the sound of the band's debut. Ross and Walker, who favored the band's new direction, departed because Urie and Smith wanted to make further changes to the band's style. Ross and Walker subsequently formed a new band, the Young Veins, leaving Urie and Smith as the sole remaining members of Panic! at the Disco.

Continuing as a duo, Urie and Smith released a new single, "New Perspective", for the film Jennifer's Body (2009), and recruited bassist Dallon Weekes and guitarist Ian Crawford as touring musicians for live performances. Weekes was later inducted into the band's lineup as a full-time member in 2010. The band's third studio album, Vices & Virtues (2011), was recorded solely by Urie and Smith in 2010, produced by John Feldmann and Butch Walker. Crawford departed once the tour cycle for Vices & Virtues ended in 2012. As a three-piece, Urie, Smith, and Weekes recorded and released the band's fourth studio album, Too Weird to Live, Too Rare to Die!, in 2013. Prior to the release of the album, Smith unofficially left the band due to health- and drug-related issues, leaving Urie and Weekes as the remaining members. The duo recruited guitarist Kenneth Harris and drummer Dan Pawlovich as touring musicians for live performances.

In 2015, Smith officially left the band after not performing live with them since his departure in 2013. Shortly thereafter, Weekes reverted to being a touring musician once again, resulting in Panic! becoming Urie's solo project. In January 2016, Panic! at the Disco released their fifth studio album, Death of a Bachelor. In December 2017, Weekes officially announced his departure from the band, with Nicole Row replacing him in the touring lineup. In June 2018, Panic! at the Disco released their sixth studio album, Pray for the Wicked, featuring their highest charting single "High Hopes". Panic! at the Disco's seventh studio album, Viva Las Vengeance, was released on August 19, 2022. Following the conclusion of the Viva Las Vengeance Tour in March 2023, Urie disbanded Panic! at the Disco.

== History ==
=== 2004–2005: Formation as rock band and early years ===
Panic! at the Disco was formed in 2004 in the suburban area of Summerlin, Las Vegas, by high school friends Ryan Ross, who played guitar, and Spencer Smith, who played drums. They both attended Bishop Gorman High School, and they began playing music together in ninth grade. They recruited bassist Brent Wilson from Palo Verde High School, who then invited his friend and classmate Brendon Urie to join the band. The quartet soon began rehearsing in Smith's grandmother's living room. Ross initially was the lead singer for the group, but after hearing Urie sing during rehearsals, the group decided to make him the lead. Initially, Panic! at the Disco was a Blink-182 cover band. The quartet decided to model their name after a line in Name Taken's song "Panic".

The band, which aimed to feature a lighter and more accessible sound when in comparison to Las Vegas' heavier music scene, signed a recording contract without having performed a live show. Urie began working at Tropical Smoothie Cafe in Summerlin to afford rent for the band's new practice space. Urie has stated that he sang for tips during his time working, thus indicating he had some prestige as a singer. The four left their educations behind to concentrate on music; Ross had a falling-out with his father when he dropped out of college, and when Urie dropped out of high school, his parents kicked him out of the house.

Ross and Urie sent a demo to Fall Out Boy bassist Pete Wentz via a LiveJournal account. Wentz, who was in Los Angeles at the time with the rest of Fall Out Boy working on the band's major-label debut, From Under the Cork Tree, drove to Las Vegas to meet with the young, unsigned band. Upon hearing "two to three" songs during band practice, Wentz was impressed and immediately wanted the band to sign to his Fueled by Ramen imprint label Decaydance Records, which made the band the first on the new label. Around December 2004, the group signed to the label. As news broke that Wentz had signed Panic! (who had yet to perform a single live show), fans on the Internet began to bash the group. "Almost right away we knew what was going to happen," Ross explained in a 2006 interview. "We had two songs online and people were already making assumptions on what kind of band we were and what we were going to sound like."

Meanwhile, Wentz began to hype the band wherever possible: from wearing "Pete! at the Disco" T-shirts onstage to mentioning the group in interviews. Wentz gave a quick shout-out to the band during a press junket on the day before the 2005 MTV Video Music Awards: "I've got a couple of bands coming out soon on Decaydance, one being this band called Panic! at the Disco," Wentz said. "Their record is going to be your next favorite record. It's called A Fever You Can't Sweat Out – get it before your little brother does." At the time of the band's signing, all of the band members were still in high school (with the exception of Ross, who was forced to quit UNLV). Urie graduated in May 2005, and Wilson and Smith finished school online as the band left for College Park, Maryland, to record their debut record.

=== 2005–2007: A Fever You Can't Sweat Out ===
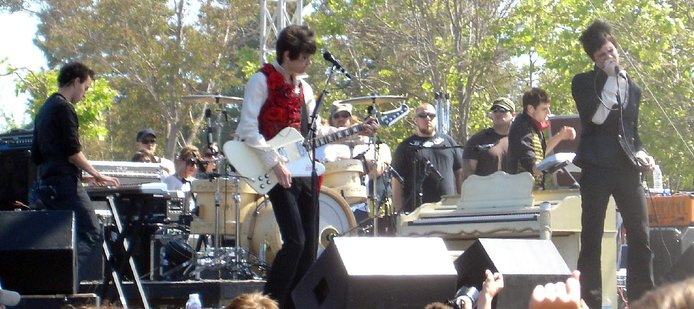
In 2006, the band headlined their first tour and achieved platinum status on their debut album.

The band relocated to College Park, Maryland, to record its debut album from June to September 2005. Although they only had shells of songs when they arrived, the rest of the album shaped up fast through the marathon session. "We didn't have a day off in the five-and-a-half weeks we were there, 12 or 14 hours a day," Ross said in a 2005 interview. "We were making things up in our heads that weren't there, and on top of the stress of trying to finish the record, we were living in a one-bedroom apartment with four people on bunk beds," recalled Ross. "Everyone got on everybody's nerves. Someone would write a new part for a song and someone else would say they didn't like it just because you ate their cereal that morning."

The album is split into two halves: the first half is mostly electronic dance punk, while the second half features Vaudevillian piano, strings, and accordion. The band grew tired of writing only with drum machines and keyboards and, inspired by film scores (specifically the works of Danny Elfman and Jon Brion) decided to write a completely different half. "By the end of that, we were completely exhausted," said Ross of the studio sessions. After its completion, "we had two weeks to come home and learn how to be a band," Ross said. The group played its first live show during the summer of 2005 at local Las Vegas music venue The Alley on West Charleston. Afterwards, the band toured nationally on the Nintendo Fusion Tour with mentors Fall Out Boy, as well as Motion City Soundtrack, the Starting Line, and Boys Night Out for the rest of 2005.

The band's debut album, A Fever You Can't Sweat Out, was released September 27, 2005. Sales began relatively slow. It debuted at No. 112 on the Billboard 200 album chart, No. 6 on the Billboard Independent Albums chart, and No. 1 on the Billboard Top Heatseekers chart, with nearly 10,000 albums sold in the first week of release. Within a span of four months, Panic! would release the video for its second single, "I Write Sins Not Tragedies", rocket up the Billboard Hot 100 as sales of Fever passed the 500,000 mark. At the end of March 2006, the band announced a headlining tour. By August, the group's debut record was certified platinum by the Recording Industry Association of America (RIAA), and the music video for "I Write Sins Not Tragedies" won Video of the Year at the 2006 MTV Video Music Awards. "Some aspects of the fame are annoying, but at the end of the day it's something we're most grateful for. It's certainly opened the door to a whole new batch of opportunities," Ross said of the band's newfound fame and instant success.

On May 17, 2006, Panic! at the Disco announced that original bassist Brent Wilson had left the band, "posting a statement that was both diplomatic and entirely inscrutable […] yet [failing] to mention any reason why Wilson is leaving Panic," according to MTV News. He was replaced in the band by Jon Walker. In June, Wilson asserted to MTV News that he was kicked out of the band via a phone call. "It was done as a phone call and the only person who spoke was Spencer. Apparently, Brendon and Ryan were on the speakerphone too, but they didn't say a word. They never even said they were sorry," explained Wilson. Smith wrote a lengthy e-mail back to James Montgomery of MTV News, stating, in part, "We made the decision based on Brent's lack of responsibility and the fact that he wasn't progressing musically with the band," and revealed that Wilson did not write nor play any bass present on Fever. Instead, Urie recorded these parts. Wilson demanded a cut in royalties, and threatened to take his former band to court.

In 2006, the band supported the Academy Is... on the band's worldwide Ambitious Ones and Smoking Guns Tour from January to May. Beginning in June, the group headlined its first unnamed national tour, that would last until August. During the group's performance at the 2006 Reading Festival in August, the band was greeted by excessive bottling, one of which hit Urie in the face that knocked him unconscious. Despite this, the band continued with its set after Urie recovered. The band's second headlining tour, dubbed the Nothing Rhymes with Circus Tour, began in November. In roughly one year, Panic! at the Disco went from being the opening act on a five-band bill to the headliners on a massive arena tour.

The Nothing Rhymes with Circus Tour feature the band's first highly theatrical live shows, which featured every song with dance numbers, skits, and tricks performed by a six-member troupe, as the band donned intricate costumes, loosely re-enacting moments from the songs. Kelefa Sanneh of The New York Times noted the sudden success and circus-inspired tour of the young band in a concert review: "There's something charming about watching a band trying to navigate sudden success, aided by a contortionist, a ribbon dancer and all the rest of it." MTV News favorably likened its theme and wardrobe to "Janet Jackson's audience-dividing, hypersexual The Velvet Rope Tour." The group, fresh off the major success of A Fever You Can't Sweat Out, took a break after non-stop touring, and the group members began formulating ideas for their next album together during the winter of 2006.

=== 2007–2009: Pretty. Odd. ===
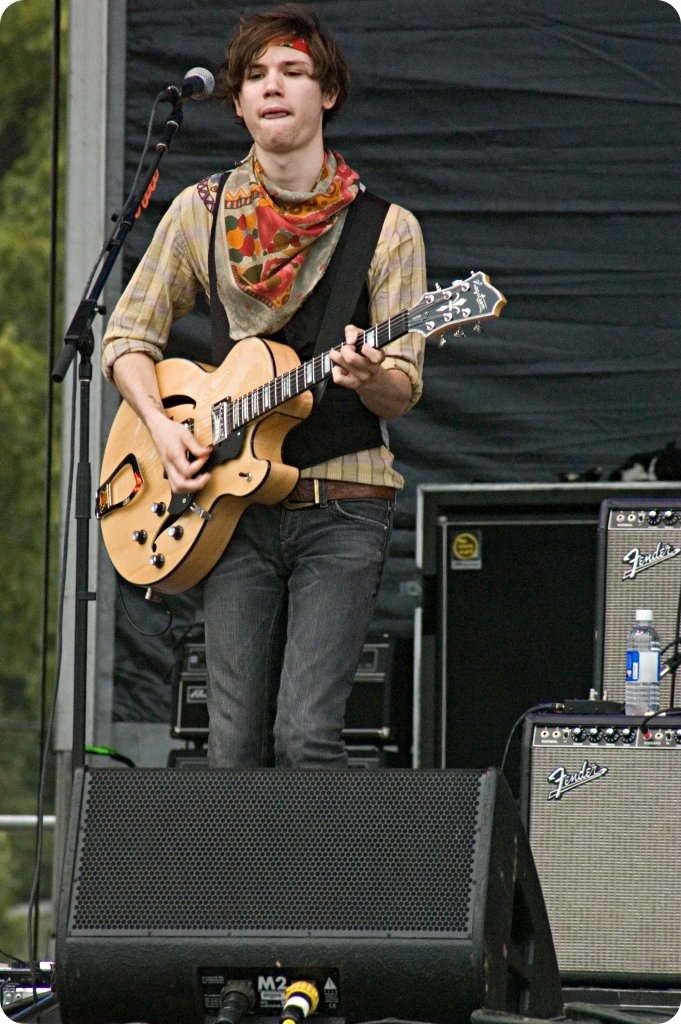
Former guitarist and vocalist Ryan Ross performing with the band in 2007. Ross was responsible for writing most of the music and lyrics until his departure in 2009.

In March 2007, after a short period of development regarding the ideas of the album, the band arrived at a cabin in the rural mountains of Mount Charleston, Nevada and began the writing process for the new album, Cricket & Clover. After recording the new tracks and performing them live over the summer, the band returned to its native Las Vegas as well as the group's old rehearsal studio, where the band members wrote their debut record. Songs such as "Scarlet" and "It's True Love" have had lyrics found. One track from Cricket & Clover, "Nearly Witches", was later featured on Vices & Virtues in 2011. The band grew uninterested in the songs previously written and by August scrapped the entire new album (which Ross later revealed was "three-quarters" done) and started over. "We wanted to approach these songs in the most basic form," Ross said. "We wrote them all on one acoustic guitar and with someone singing. I think that we kind of skipped that part of songwriting on the first record, and this time we're sort of paying attention to that. […] We've written a bunch of songs since we've been home [Las Vegas]. I think it's the most fun and the happiest we've been since we started." With simplicity the new focus and the old album shelved, the group settled in and began recording what would become Pretty. Odd. In October, the band entered the Studio at the Palms at the Palms Casino Resort in Las Vegas to begin recording the album.

In January 2008, the band unveiled a new logo and dropped the exclamation point from the group's name, becoming Panic at the Disco. Released on March 21, 2008, Pretty. Odd. was described by the band as "more organic and mellower" than A Fever You Can't Sweat Out, as well as unintentionally and coincidentally similar to music of the Beatles, in both songwriting and scope. The record debuted at number two on the US Billboard 200 chart, with first-day sales of 54,000, and first-week sales of 139,000 copies in the United States. Those figures marked the band's biggest sales week to that date, beating a previous record held by A Fever You Can't Sweat Out (which sold 45,000 during the winter of 2006). The record also debuted at Current Alternative Albums chart and No. 2 on the Digital Albums chart, the latter of which accounted for 26 percent of the disc's overall sales. The album charted high in various other countries and was eventually certified gold in the United Kingdom, however, Pretty. Odd. received relatively disappointing sales in the face of its predecessor. Pretty. Odd. was, however, critically acclaimed in contrast to Fever: Barry Walters of Spin called Panic's debut album "embarrassing" while regarding the new record as "[daring] to be optimistically beautiful at a time when sadness and ugliness might have won them easier credibility."

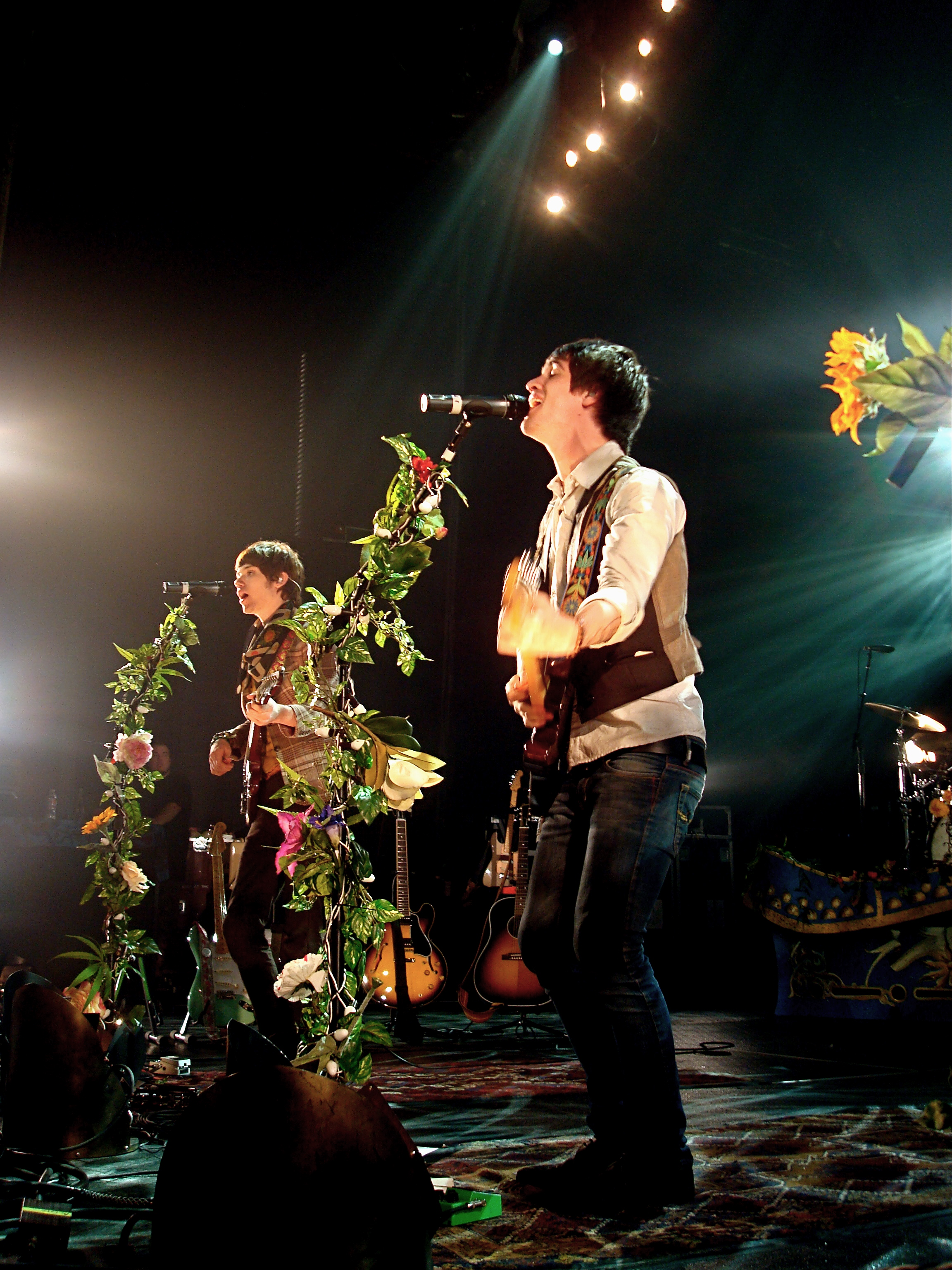
The band's musical style changed after the release of their psychedelic-inspired album Pretty. Odd.

The band announced plans to headline the 2008 Honda Civic Tour in January 2008, which took up the majority of early touring for the album. Motion City Soundtrack, the Hush Sound and Phantom Planet opened for the tour, which performed across North America from April 10 to July 14, 2008 . Throughout October and November 2008, the band toured with Dashboard Confessional and the Cab on the Rock Band Live Tour promoting the video game Rock Band 2.

As expected and predicted by several music publications, the band adopted a very different style for the touring in support of Pretty. Odd., in contrast to the dark, circus-themed elements of the band's previous stage shows. Each show contained "woodsy set pieces, projections of flora and fauna, and mic stands wrapped in lights and flowers," and each band member dressed in a vest. While reflecting on the theatrical nature of A Fever You Can't Sweat Out touring, Urie commented: "We did it and it was a lot of fun when we did it, but this time around I think we wanted to get back to a more intimate, personal setting, and scale it down a little bit." Ryan Ross explained that: "It's more about connecting with the audience and seeing what's gonna happen every night. It's not as scripted out and pre-planned. It makes it more exciting for us, and less monotonous every night." A live album, ...Live in Chicago, based on live recordings from Chicago during the Honda Civic Tour, was released December 2, 2008. An accompanying DVD contains photos from the tour, each music video from the album as well as behind-the-scenes footage of the videos and the tour, the short film Panic! at the Disco In: American Valley, and the documentary feature based on the tour, All in a Day's.

Pretty. Odd.'s touring was also defined by a larger effort to remain environmentally conscious. On the tour, the band worked with two non-profit eco organizations: Reverb, which facilitates environmentally friendly touring; and Global Inheritance, which seeks to inspire more eco-activism. In a 2008 interview, Ross revealed that the band began traveling on a biodiesel bus, re-using plastics, and recycling more backstage. The band went as far as to print tour booklets on recycled paper, with soy ink, and organize an "eco-contest", in which profits from the tour went straight to environmental organizations.

=== 2009–2015: Lineup change, Vices & Virtues and Too Weird to Live, Too Rare to Die! ===
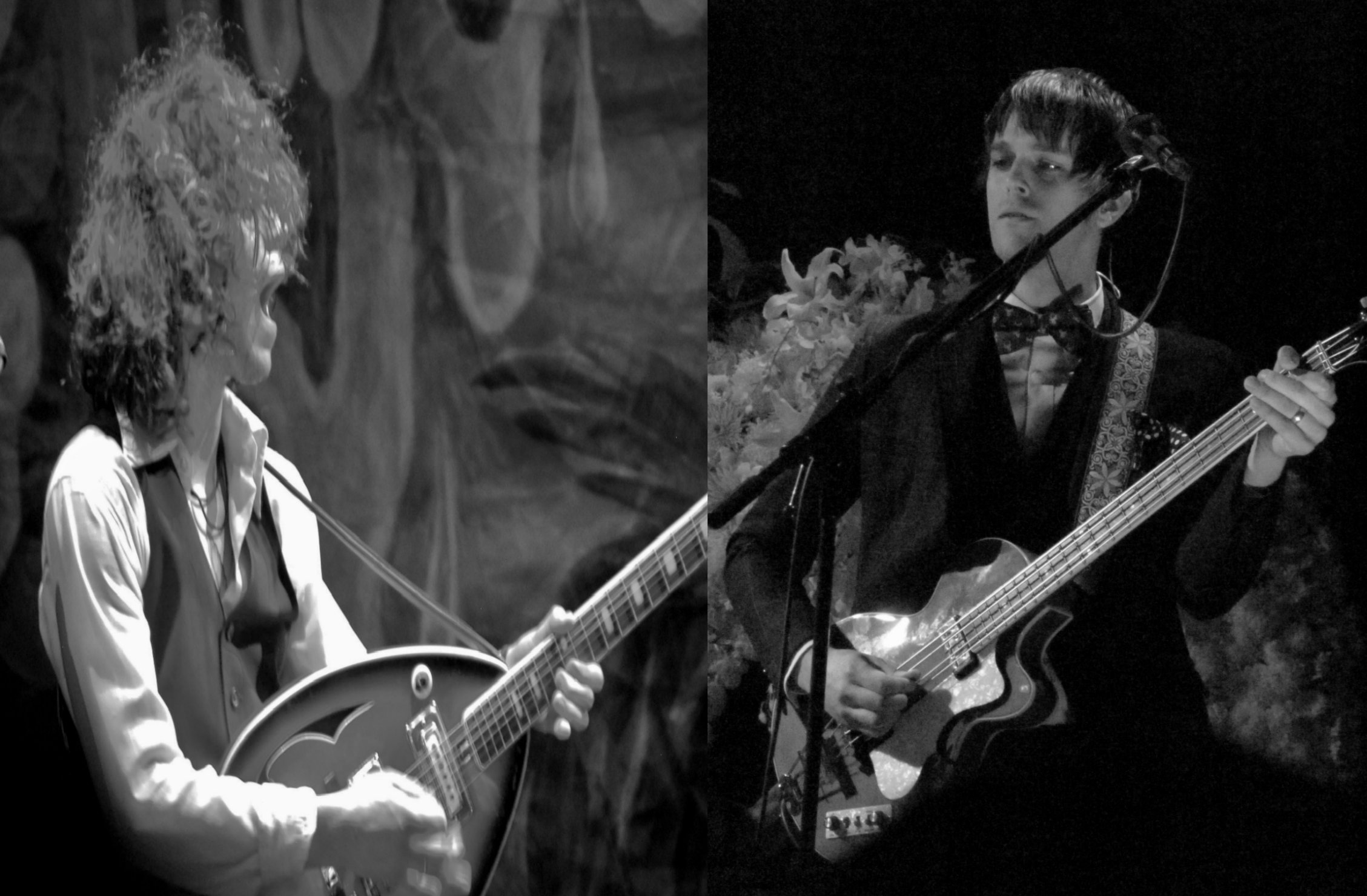
Ian Crawford (left) and Dallon Weekes (right) replaced Ross and Walker ahead of the Blink-182 Summer Tour.

In spring 2009, the band began recording material for its third studio album. However, on July 6, 2009, Ryan Ross and Jon Walker announced via the band's official website that the two were leaving the band. In an interview following the split, Ross explained that he first brought the idea to Smith in late June 2009 over lunch: "Spencer and I had lunch and caught up for a while, and then the big question came up, like, 'Well, what do you want to do?' and I said, 'Well, I think it might be best if we kind of do our own thing for a while,' and he said, 'I'm glad you said that, because I was going to say the same thing,'" Ross recalled. "And there was really no argument, which is really the best way that could've worked out." Ross said the split was largely due to creative differences between him and Urie. Urie wanted the band to explore a more polished pop sound, while Ross – and, by extension, Walker – was interested in making retro-inspired rock. Walker and Ross went on to form The Young Veins, which only released one album, Take a Vacation!.

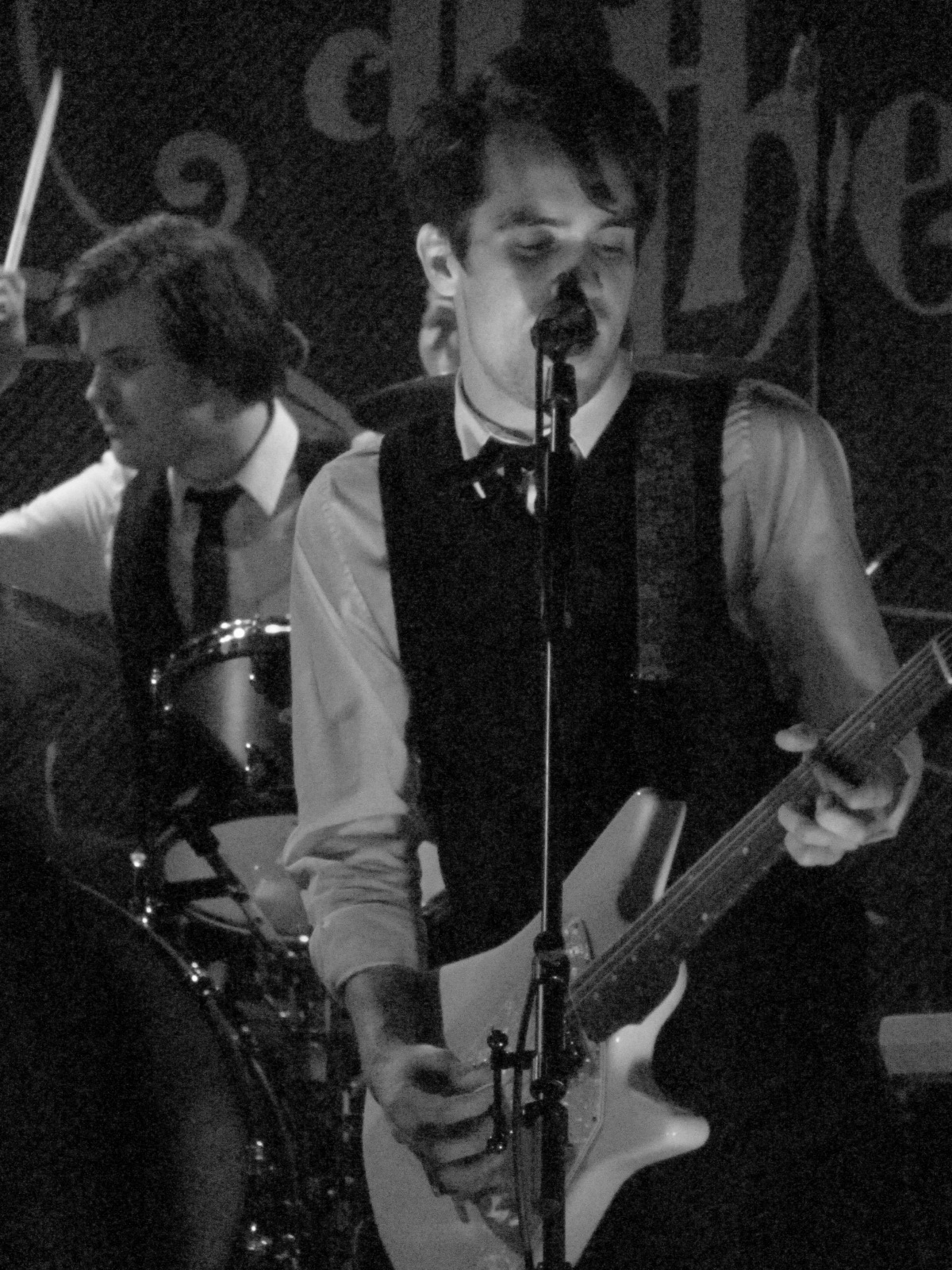
Smith and Urie became the remaining original members of the band after the departure of Ross and Walker.

The news asserted that both tour plans with Blink-182 in August 2009 and new album production "will continue as previously announced." The following day, Alternative Press broke the news that "New Perspective", the first song recorded without Ross and Walker, would debut the following month on radio and as a part of the soundtrack to the film Jennifer's Body. On July 10, 2009, Alternative Press also reported that the band had regained the exclamation point, becoming, once again, Panic! at the Disco. "New Perspective" was released on July 28, 2009. Former guitarist of pop rock band the Cab, Ian Crawford and Dallon Weekes, frontman of indie rock band the Brobecks, filled in for Ross and Walker on tour during the Blink-182 Summer Tour in August 2009.

The band re-entered the studio in early 2010 and spent much of the year recording the group's third studio album. During this time, touring bassist Dallon Weekes joined the band's official lineup along with Urie and Smith, making the band a three-piece. Although Weekes did not perform on the upcoming album, he was responsible for the conceptualization of the album's cover art and was also featured on the album cover, masked and standing in the background behind Smith and Urie. On January 18, 2011, the band revealed that an album titled Vices & Virtues would officially be released on March 22, 2011. The album was produced by Butch Walker and John Feldmann. The record's first single, "The Ballad of Mona Lisa", was released digitally on February 1, 2011, with the music video being released February 8, 2011. Vices & Virtues was officially released on March 22, 2011, to relatively positive critical reviews.

The band began touring in support of the album, christened the Vices & Virtues Tour, in earnest beginning in February 2011. The tour has sported the same electric, over-the-top theatricality the band was known for during the Fever era. "I really miss wearing costumes and makeup," Urie told Spin. "I love throwing a big production. I've recently been reading about Tesla coils and I'm trying to figure out how I can get one that sits on the stage and shoots sparks without hurting anybody." The group was scheduled to play the Australian Soundwave Revolution festival in September/October but the festival was canceled. The band performed at the Counter-Revolution mini-festival, the festival that took its place.

On May 12, 2011, the band collaborated with indie pop band Fun. and the two groups embarked on an American tour, releasing a single together titled "C'mon". Panic! at the Disco contributed a new song, "Mercenary", to the soundtrack for the video game Batman: Arkham City.

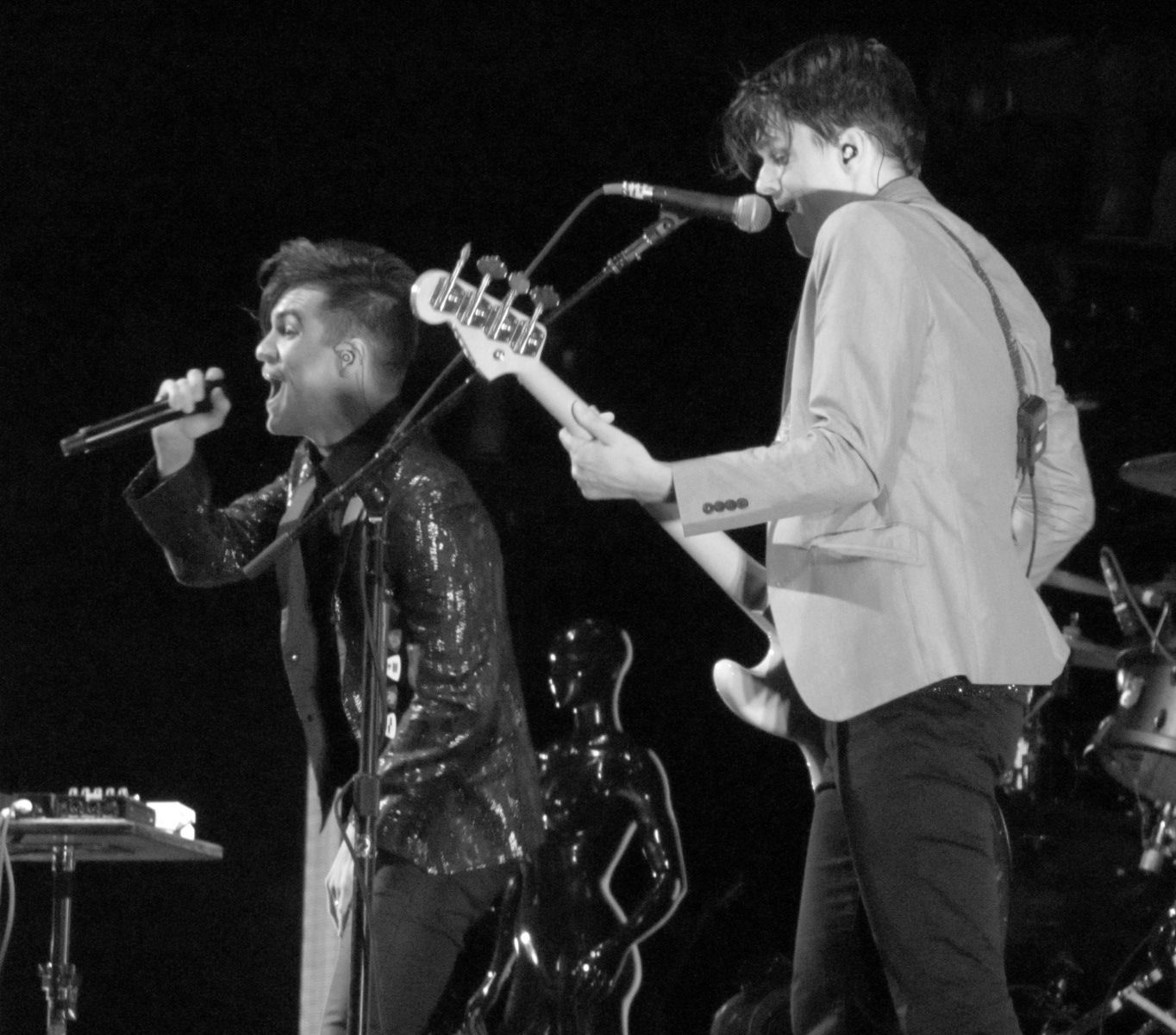
After the unofficial departure of Smith due to drug addiction problems, Urie and Weekes were the remaining members of the band from 2013 to 2015.

After the Vices & Virtues tour cycle, Urie, Smith, and Weekes began writing and preparing for a fourth album. During the recording of the album, touring guitarist Ian Crawford, who joined the band in 2009 after the departure of Ryan Ross and Jon Walker, left the band citing his desire to make "real, genuine" music. On July 15, 2013, the album was announced as Too Weird to Live, Too Rare to Die!, with a scheduled release date of October 8, 2013. The first single, "Miss Jackson", was released on July 15, 2013, along with its music video to promote the album. Panic! at the Disco opened for Fall Out Boy on the Save Rock And Roll Arena Tour.

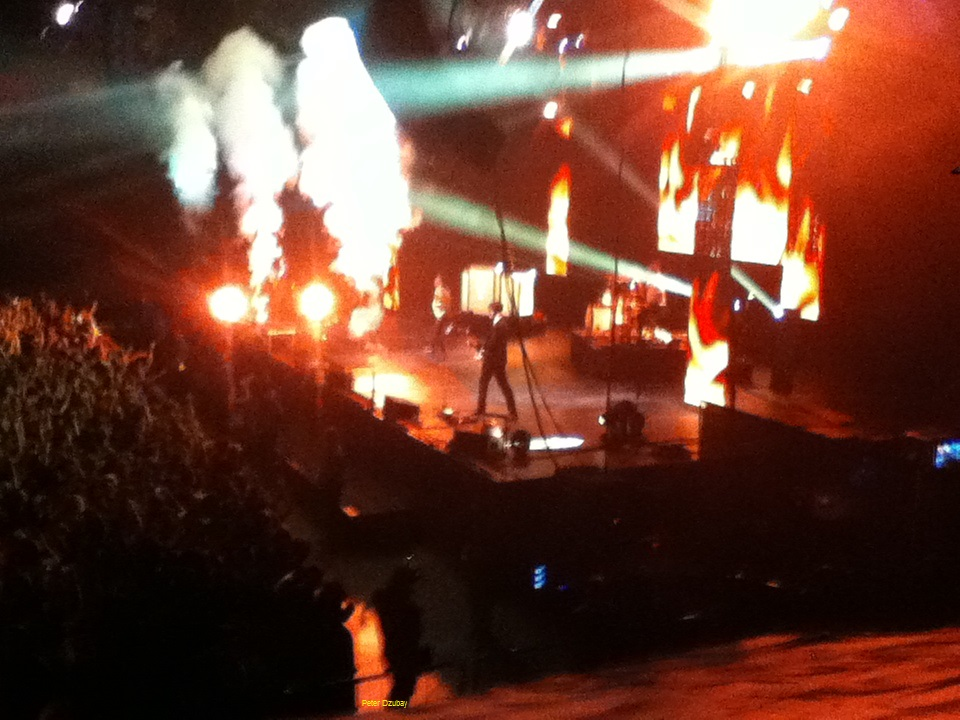
Panic! at the Disco performing in Uncasville, Connecticut at the Mohegan Sun Arena during the Gospel Tour

Shortly before the band began its first tour in support of the album, Smith wrote an open letter to fans regarding his abuse of alcohol and prescription medications since the recording of Pretty. Odd. Although Smith joined the band for the first handful of dates, he left the tour to "continue fighting addiction." Urie posted on the band's official website on August 7, 2013, that "It's become evident that Spencer still needs more time to take care of himself. I can't expect him to be fighting addiction one minute and be fully immersed in a national tour the next. With that said, the tour will continue without Spencer while he is away getting the help he needs." With Spencer's leave of absence, Dan Pawlovich of the band Valencia filled in on tour.

In an interview with Pure Fresh on September 23, 2014, Urie stated that he had already thought about ideas on the fifth studio album; however, he was not sure if it would be a Panic! at the Disco album, or a solo album. Urie also stated there were no plans for Smith to return to the band.

=== 2015–2019: Transition to solo project, Death of a Bachelor and Pray for the Wicked ===
On April 2, 2015, Smith announced that he had officially left the band. That same month, Urie revealed in an interview with Kerrang! that he was working on new material for the band's fifth studio album.

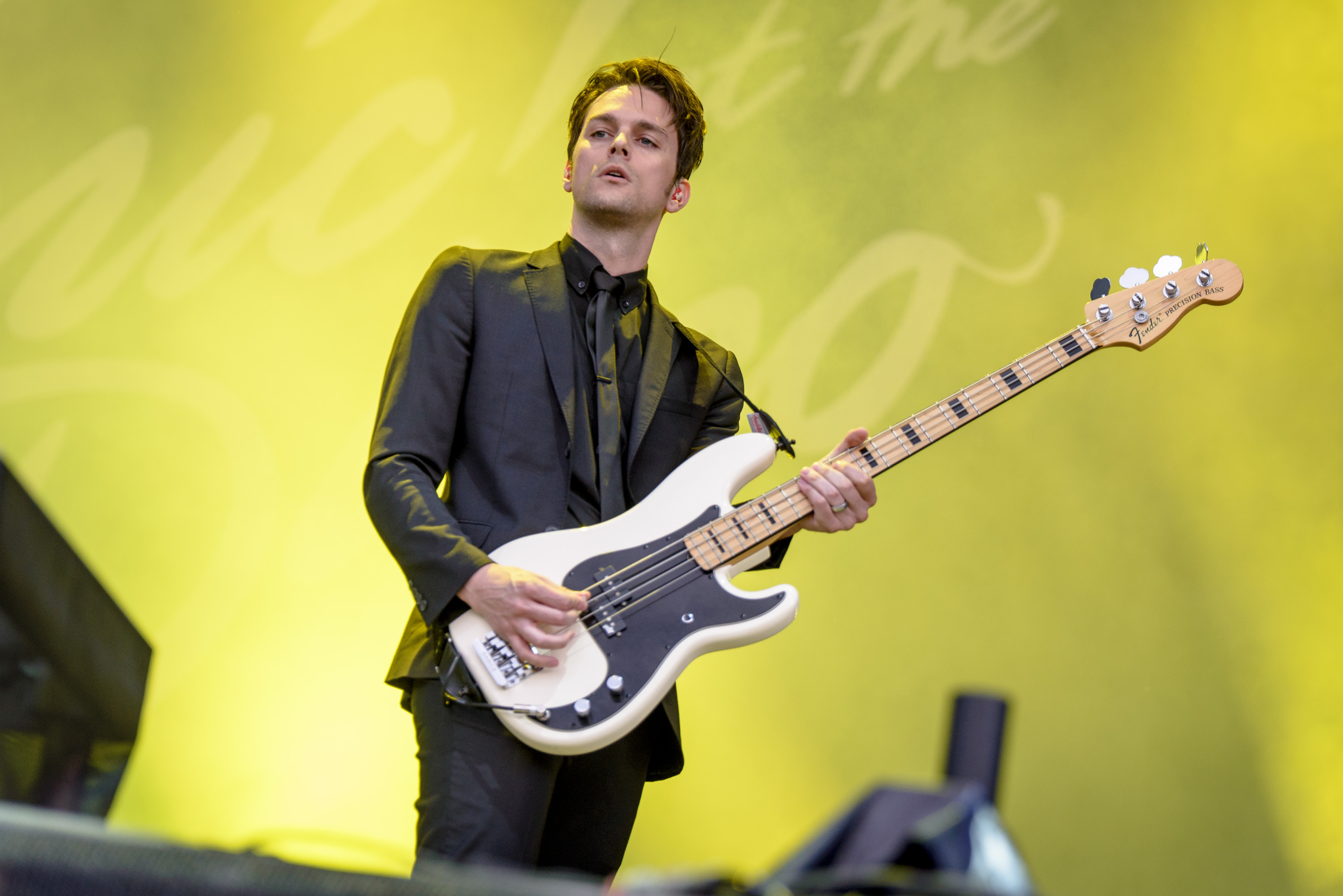
After Smith's departure, Weekes was the only remaining member since their first major lineup change to not leave the band.

On April 20, 2015, Urie released "Hallelujah" as a single without any previous formal announcements. It debuted on the Billboard Hot 100 at No. 40, the band's second highest ever after "I Write Sins Not Tragedies". The band performed at the KROQ Weenie Roast on May 16, 2015. On September 1, 2015, another song from the fifth studio album, "Death of a Bachelor", premiered on an Apple Music broadcast hosted by Pete Wentz. The second single, "Victorious" was released at the end of the month. On October 22, 2015, through the band's official Facebook page, Urie announced the new album as Death of a Bachelor with a scheduled release date of January 15, 2016. It is the first album written and composed by Urie with a team of writers, as the status of Weekes was announced to have changed from an official member to that of a touring musician once again. Weekes' status was rumored during the promotion of Death of a Bachelor that he was no longer an official member. The third single "Emperor's New Clothes" was released on the same day, along with the official music video. "LA Devotee" was released November 26 as a promotional single. On December 31, 2015, the band released "Don't Threaten Me with a Good Time".

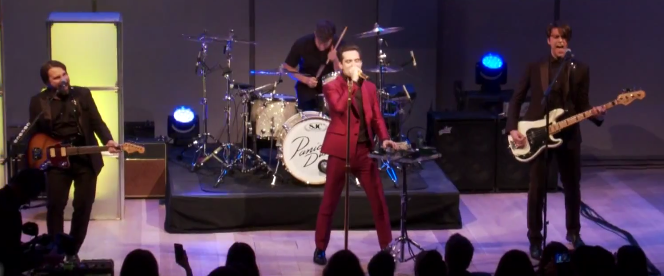
Panic! at the Disco at the Shorty Awards in 2015, where they first performed as a solo project.

The band co-headlined the Weezer & Panic! at the Disco Summer Tour 2016 with Weezer from June to August 2016. The band released a cover of Queen's "Bohemian Rhapsody" in August 2016, on the Suicide Squad soundtrack album.

On September 22, 2016, the band released the music video for "LA Devotee". With the release came the announcement of the Death of a Bachelor Tour in 2017. MisterWives and Saint Motel were announced as the opening acts. In a December 2016 interview, Urie said that he hoped to make a music video for every song on the album Death of a Bachelor.

On December 15, 2017, the band released their fourth live album All My Friends We're Glorious: Death of a Bachelor Tour Live. It was released as a limited-edition double-vinyl and digital download. Five days later, the band released a non-album Christmas song titled "Feels Like Christmas". On December 27, bassist Dallon Weekes officially announced his departure from Panic! at the Disco after over eight years of performing in the band, subsequently shifting his focus as the frontman of the band (now solo project) I Dont Know How but They Found Me. On March 19, 2018, the band played a surprise show in Cleveland, Ohio, with new touring bassist, Nicole Row. On March 21, 2018, the band released two new songs "Say Amen (Saturday Night)" and "(Fuck A) Silver Lining". At the same time, the band also announced the Pray for the Wicked Tour and a new album called Pray for the Wicked.

On June 7, 2018, the band performed at the fountains at the Bellagio prior to game five of the Stanley Cup Final. The performance is said to have had sentimental value to the band as they took to the stage in their hometown. The band also performed as a headliner at the Reading and Leeds Festival 2018 which lasted over the weekend from August 24 to 26, 2018. On August 27, 2018, the band dropped the music video for the single "High Hopes". In fall of 2018, "High Hopes" became the highest placing single from the band, becoming number 4 on the Billboard Hot 100.

On September 22, 2018, the band announced that longtime touring guitarist Kenneth Harris would be dismissed following multiple allegations of sexual misconduct involving underage fans. Harris' replacement was announced to be former Sparks the Rescue guitarist Mike Naran on October 6, 2018.

The band's version of the song "Into the Unknown" is featured on the soundtrack to the 2019 film Frozen II and in the end credits. The song appears in the film as performed by Idina Menzel.

=== 2019–2023: Viva Las Vengeance and disbandment ===
In May 2019, Urie revealed in an interview with Billboard that he began working on ideas for another Panic! at the Disco album, saying "I thought I would take a little more time off and I'm already starting music. Not with anything planned in mind, but just working on some ideas. I can't help myself so I don't think it'll be too long before another Panic! record."

On May 14, 2022, the band set up a website called "Shut Up and Go to Bed" to tease new music. On May 29, it was announced that Panic would be returning with a new single called "Viva Las Vengeance" on June 1, alongside hints of future material. With the release of the music video, it was announced that Panic's seventh album would also be titled Viva Las Vengeance with a release date of August 19, and future tour dates in fall 2022. On July 20, 2022, the second single "Middle Of A Breakup" was released. On August 5, 2022, the third single "Local God" was released. On August 16, 2022, the fourth single "Don't Let the Light Go Out" was released. On the same day as the album release, a music video for the song "Sad Clown" was released. On November 15, 2022, it was announced that the Chicago show from the Viva Las Vengeance Tour would be streamed as a digital concert on December 7 and 8, 2022, under the name Everybody Needs a Place to Go: An Evening with Panic! at the Disco. On October 28, 2022, the band re-released their 2016 song "House of Memories" along with its slowed-down and sped-up versions, after the song went viral on TikTok.

On January 24, 2023, Urie revealed that he and his wife were expecting a child together, and that he would be discontinuing Panic! at the Disco in order to focus on his family, following the conclusion of the Viva Las Vengeance Tour on March 10 in Manchester, England.

==== Post-disbandment activity (2024–present) ====
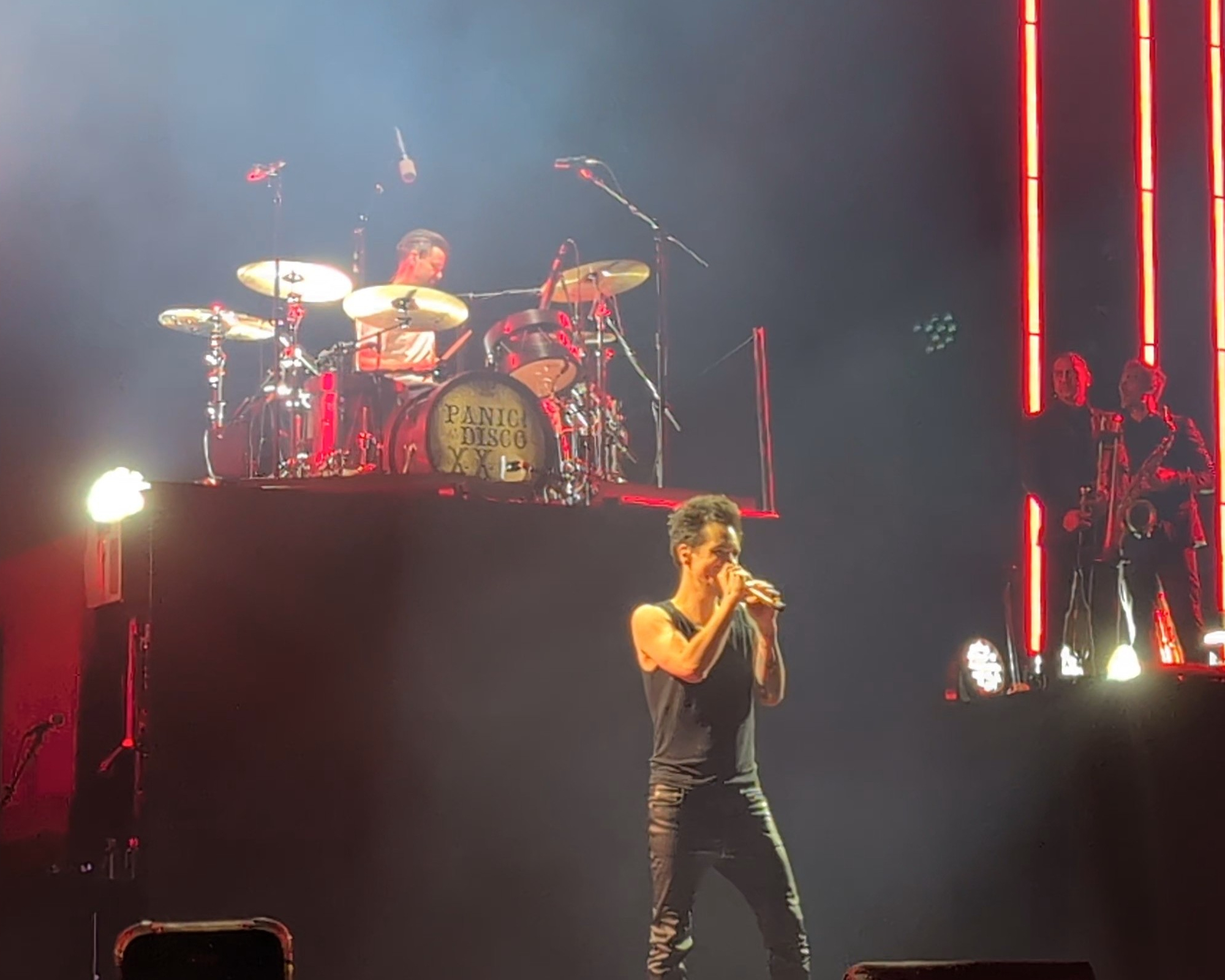
Urie and Smith performing "I Write Sins, Not Tragedies".

On October 29, 2024, it was announced that Panic! would return to perform as one of the headliners of the When We Were Young festival on October 18 and 19, 2025, to perform A Fever You Can't Sweat Out in its entirety. On both nights of the festival, Smith briefly joined Panic! on stage to play drums for a second, closing performance of "I Write Sins Not Tragedies". The day after the festival, details were revealed for a 20th anniversary deluxe edition of A Fever You Can't Sweat Out, along with the 2006 live album Live in Denver being released on vinyl and streaming for the first time.

On February 1, 2025, former members Ryan Ross and Dallon Weekes performed together for the first time at a Phantom Planet benefit concert for the Los Angeles fires, performing the band's song "Do the Panic".

== Musical style and influences ==
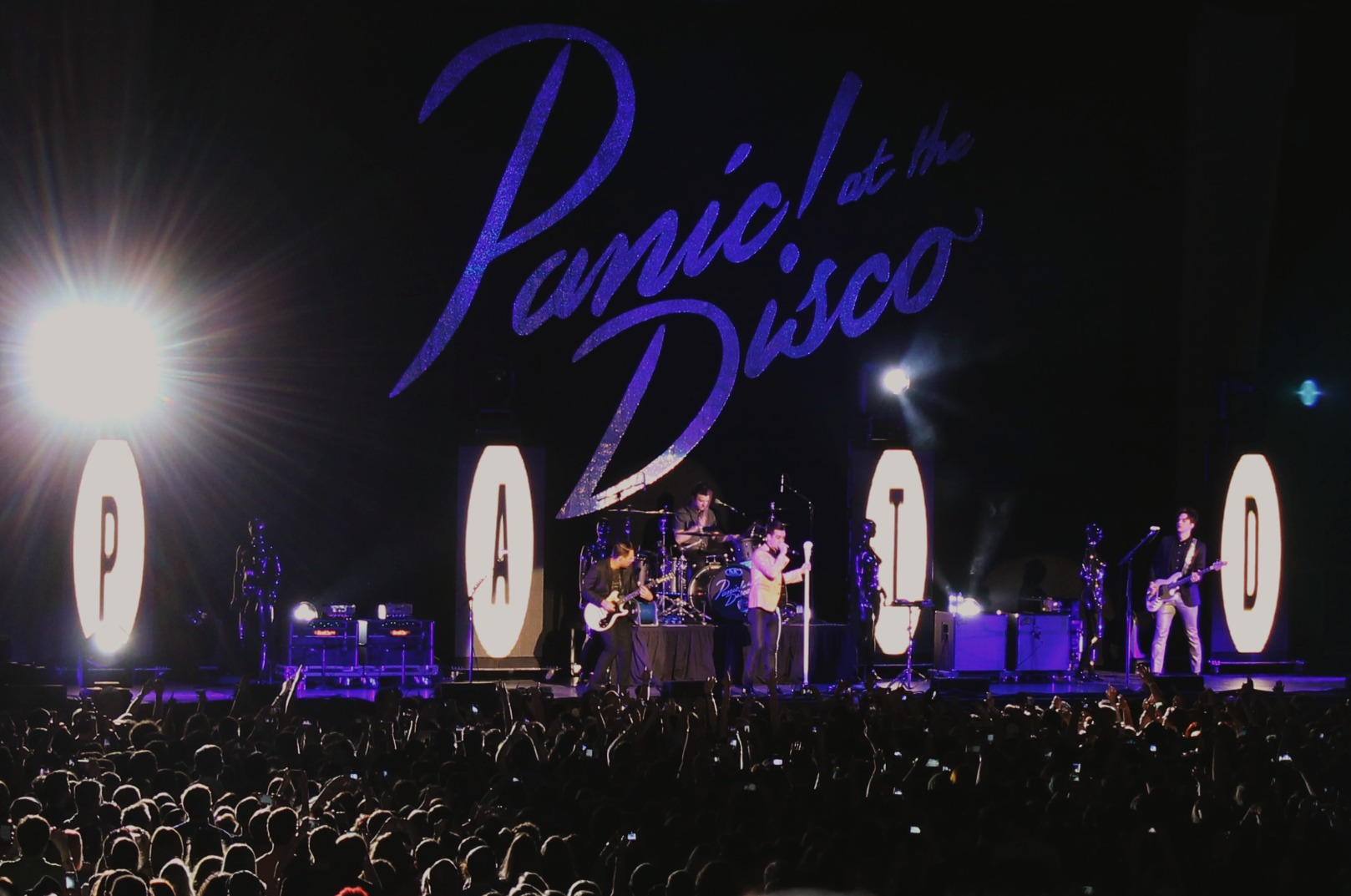
Panic! at the Disco performing in 2013.

Panic! at the Disco has been described as pop rock, baroque pop, electropop, alternative rock, pop-punk, emo, emo pop, dance-punk, pop, dance-pop, and synth-pop. (Note: Musical styles: "pop rock"; "baroque pop"; "electropop"; "alternative rock"; "pop-punk"; "emo"; "emo pop"; "dance punk"; "pop"; "dance-pop"; "synth-pop")

Urie has cited bands/artists such as Frank Sinatra, Queen, David Bowie, Tom DeLonge, Weezer, Green Day, and My Chemical Romance as his biggest influences.

== Band members ==
Final lineup

- Brendon Urie – lead vocals, guitars, keyboards (2004–2023, 2025); bass (2005–2018); drums, percussion (2015–2023)

Touring

- Dan Pawlovich – drums, percussion, backing vocals (2013–2023, 2025)
- Chris Bautista – trumpet (2016–2023, 2025)
- Erm Navarro – trombone (2016–2023, 2025)
- Jesse Molloy – saxophone (2016–2023, 2025)
- Nicole Row – bass, backing vocals (2018–2023, 2025)
- Mike Naran – guitars, backing vocals (2018–2023, 2025)
- Kiara Ana Perico – viola (2018–2023, 2025)
- Leah Metzler – cello (2018–2023, 2025)
- Laurann Angel – violin (2025)

Former

- Ryan Ross – guitars, vocals, keyboards (2004–2009)
- Spencer Smith – drums, percussion, occasional backing vocals (2004–2015, guest 2025) (Note: Although Smith would not formally depart from the band until April 2015, he had not been a part of the band's touring ensemble since August 2013.)
- Brent Wilson – bass (2004–2006)
- Jon Walker – bass, keyboards, guitars, backing vocals (2006–2009)
- Dallon Weekes – bass, keyboards, guitars, vocals (2010–2015; touring 2009–2010, 2015–2017)

Touring

- Bartram Nason – cello, keyboards, electronic drums, percussion (2006)
- Eric Ronick – keyboards, percussion, backing vocals (2006–2008, 2009)
- Adrian Hibbs – keyboards, percussion, backing vocals (2008)
- Ian Crawford – guitars, percussion, backing vocals (2009–2012)
- Kenneth Harris – guitars, backing vocals (2013–2018)
- Desiree Hazley – violin (2018–2019)
- Michelle Shin – violin (2022–2023)
- Jake Sinclair – guitars, keytar, percussion, backing vocals (2022–2023)
- Mike Viola – guitars, backing vocals (2022–2023)
- Rachel White – guitars, backing vocals (2022–2023)

== Discography ==
Studio albums

- A Fever You Can't Sweat Out (2005)
- Pretty. Odd. (2008)
- Vices & Virtues (2011)
- Too Weird to Live, Too Rare to Die! (2013)
- Death of a Bachelor (2016)
- Pray for the Wicked (2018)
- Viva Las Vengeance (2022)

== Tours ==
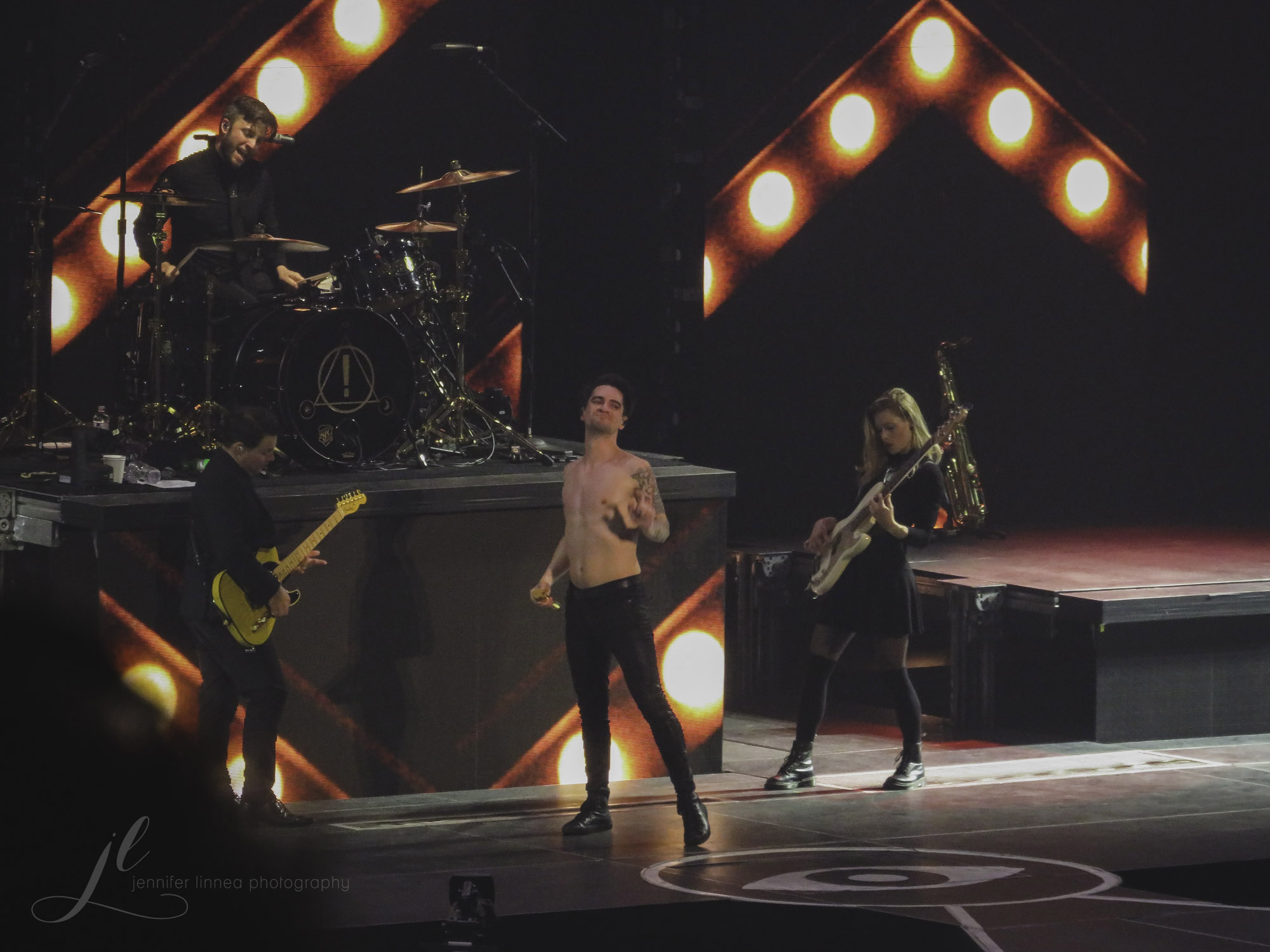
Panic! at the Disco performing at the Pepsi Center during the Pray for the Wicked Tour in 2018.

Headlining

- 2005 Tour (2005)
- Nothing Rhymes with Circus Tour (2006)
- Vices & Virtues Tour (2011–2012)
- 2013 Tour (2013)
- Too Weird to Live, Too Rare to Die! Tour (2014)
- The Gospel Tour (2014)
- Death of a Bachelor Tour (2017)
- Pray for the Wicked Tour (2018–2019)
- Viva Las Vengeance Tour (2022–2023)

Co-headlining

- Nintendo Fusion Tour (with Fall Out Boy, The Starting Line, Motion City Soundtrack and Boys Night Out) (2005)
- Honda Civic Tour (with Motion City Soundtrack, Death Cab for Cutie, Phantom Planet and The Hush Sound) (2008)
- Rock Band Live Tour (with Dashboard Confessional) (2008)
- Summer Tour 2016 (with Weezer) (2016)

Opening Act

- Take Cover Tour (for Acceptance and The Receiving End of Sirens) (2005)
- Ambitious Ones and Smoking Guns Tour (for The Academy Is...) (2006)
- Truckstops & Statelines Tour (for The Academy Is...) (2006)
- Blink-182 in Concert (Blink-182) (2009)
- Save Rock and Roll Tour (for Fall Out Boy) (2013)

== Awards and nominations ==
=== American Music Awards ===
Year	Category	Nominated work	Result	Ref.
2018	Alternative Artist	Panic! at the Disco	Won	
2019	Alternative Artist	Panic! at the Disco	Nominated	
2019	Favorite Pop/Rock Band/Duo/Group	Panic! at the Disco	Nominated	
2019	Favorite Pop/Rock Song	"High Hopes"	Nominated	

=== Billboard Music Awards ===
Year	Category	Nominated work	Result	Ref.
2018	Top Rock Album	Death of a Bachelor	Nominated	
2019	Top Duo/Group	Panic! at the Disco	Nominated	
2019	Top Rock Artist	Panic! at the Disco	Nominated	
2019	Top Rock Album	Pray for the Wicked	Won	
2019	Top Rock Song	"High Hopes"	Won	
2020	Top Duo/Group	Panic! at the Disco	Nominated	
2020	Top Rock Artist	Panic! at the Disco	Won	
2020	Top Rock Song	"Hey Look Ma, I Made It"	Won	

=== GLSEN Annual Respect Awards ===
Year	Nominee / work	Award	Result	Ref.
2019	Brendon Urie	Inspiration Award	Won	

=== Grammy Awards ===
Year	Category	Nominated work	Result	Ref.
2009	Best Boxed or Special Limited Edition Package	Pretty. Odd.	Nominated	
2017	Best Rock Album	Death of a Bachelor	Nominated	

=== iHeartRadio Music Awards ===
Year	Category	Nominated work	Result	Ref.
2019	Best Duo/Group of the Year	Panic! at the Disco	Nominated	
2019	Alternative Rock Artist of the Year	Panic! at the Disco	Nominated	
2019	Alternative Rock Song of the Year	"High Hopes"	Won	
2019	Alternative Rock Album of the Year	Pray for the Wicked	Won	

=== MTV Europe Music Awards ===
Year	Category	Nominated work	Result	Ref.
2018	Best Alternative	Panic! at the Disco	Won	
2019	Best Rock	Panic! at the Disco	Nominated	
2019	Best Video	"Me!" (Taylor Swift featuring Brendon Urie of Panic! at the Disco)	Won	
2022	Best Alternative	Panic! at the Disco	Nominated	

=== MTV Video Music Awards ===
Year	Category	Nominated work	Result	Ref.
2006	Video of the Year	"I Write Sins Not Tragedies"	Won	
2006	Best New Artist in a Video	"I Write Sins Not Tragedies"	Nominated	
2006	Best Group Video	"I Write Sins Not Tragedies"	Nominated	
2006	Best Rock Video	"I Write Sins Not Tragedies"	Nominated	
2006	Best Art Direction	"I Write Sins Not Tragedies"	Nominated	
2008	Best Pop Video	"Nine in the Afternoon"	Nominated	
2008	Best Direction	"Nine in the Afternoon"	Nominated	
2016	Best Rock Video	"Victorious"	Nominated	
2018	Best Rock Video	"Say Amen (Saturday Night)"	Nominated	
2019	Best Rock Video	"High Hopes"	Won	
2019	Best Collaboration	"Me!" (Taylor Swift featuring Brendon Urie of Panic! at the Disco)	Nominated	
2019	Best Visual Effects	"Me!" (Taylor Swift featuring Brendon Urie of Panic! at the Disco)	Won	
2019	Best Cinematography	"Me!" (Taylor Swift featuring Brendon Urie of Panic! at the Disco)	Nominated	
2022	Best Alternative	Viva Las Vengeance	Nominated	
2023	Best Choreography	"Middle of a Breakup"	Nominated	

=== Teen Choice Awards ===
Year	Category	Nominated work	Result	Ref.
2008	Choice Rock Track	Nine in the Afternoon	Nominated	
2018	Rock Artist	Panic! at the Disco	Nominated	
2018	Rock/Alternative Song	"High Hopes"	Nominated	
2019	Choice Music Group	Panic! at the Disco	Nominated	
2019	Choice Rock Artist	Panic! at the Disco	Won	
2019	Choice Song: Group	Hey Look Ma, I Made It	Nominated	
2019	Choice Rock Song	Hey Look Ma, I Made It	Won	
2019	Choice Song: Female Artist	"Me!" (Taylor Swift featuring Brendon Urie of Panic! at the Disco)	Nominated	
2019	Choice Pop Song	"Me!" (Taylor Swift featuring Brendon Urie of Panic! at the Disco)	Nominated	

=== Tony Awards ===
Year	Category	Nominated work	Result	Ref.
2018	Best Original Score	SpongeBob SquarePants	Nominated	

=== Other awards ===
Year	Award	Category	Nominated work	Result	Ref.
2006	TMF Awards	Best Video International	"I Write Sins Not Tragedies"	Won	
2006	GAFFA Awards (Denmark)	Best International New Artist	Panic! at the Disco	Nominated	
2007	Los Premios MTV Latinoamérica	Best International Rock Group	Panic! at the Disco	Nominated	
2007	Kerrang! Awards	Best International Band	Panic! at the Disco	Nominated	
2008	Los Premios MTV Latinoamérica	Best International Rock Group	Panic! at the Disco	Nominated	
2008	MTV Asia Awards	The Style Award	Panic! at the Disco	Won	
2011	Kerrang! Awards	Best Single	"The Ballad of Mona Lisa"	Nominated	
2014	Alternative Press Music Awards	Best Vocalist	Brendon Urie	Won	
2014	Alternative Press Music Awards	Artist of the Year	Panic! at the Disco	Nominated	
2015	Alternative Press Music Awards	Best Bassist	Dallon Weekes	Nominated	
2015	Alternative Press Music Awards	Best Live Band	Panic! at the Disco	Nominated	
2015	Rock Sound Readers Poll	Video of the Year	"Emperor's New Clothes"	Won	
2016	Alternative Press Music Awards	Best Music Video	"Emperor's New Clothes"	Won	
2016	Alternative Press Music Awards	Song of the Year	"Hallelujah"	Won	
2016	Alternative Press Music Awards	Artist of the Year	Panic! at the Disco	Nominated	
2017	Alternative Press Music Awards	Artist of the Year	Panic! at the Disco	Won	
2017	People's Choice Awards	Favorite Group	Panic! at the Disco	Nominated	
2018	Rock Sound Awards	Artist of the Year	Panic! at the Disco	Won	
2018	Outer Critics Circle Awards	Outstanding New Score	SpongeBob SquarePants	Won	
2019	Kerrang! Awards	Best International Band	Panic! at the Disco	Nominated	
2019	LOS40 Music Awards	International New Artist of the Year	Panic! at the Disco	Nominated	
2019	LOS40 Music Awards	International Song of the Year	"High Hopes"	Nominated	
2019	Key to the City of Las Vegas	Key to the City	Brendon Urie	Won	
2022	People's Choice Awards	Favorite Group	Panic! at the Disco	Nominated	
