= House of Memories (song) =

- EP cover

Song by Panic! at the Disco

from the album Death of a Bachelor
- Released: January 15, 2016 (album version); October 28, 2022 (EP)
- Genre: Electro rock; electropop; alternative rock; pop rock
- Length: 3:28
- Label: Fueled by Ramen
- Songwriters: Brendon Urie; Morgan Kibby; Jake Sinclair
- Producer: Jake Sinclair

Audio video
- "House of Memories" on YouTube

"House of Memories" is a song by American rock solo project Panic! at the Disco. It was released on January 15, 2016, as the tenth track on the band's fifth studio album, Death of a Bachelor (2016). The song gained popularity in April 2022, causing it to chart in multiple countries, including Austria, Germany, the Netherlands, Norway, Portugal, Sweden and Switzerland.

On October 28, 2022, the song was released as an EP along with slowed down and sped up versions, as a result of the song's success earlier that year on TikTok.

== Critical reception ==
Upon release in 2016, the song received lukewarm reviews from critics. Nate Chinen at New York Times called it a song "about being lonely while in love", "with an intriguing frisson".

However, Lisa Henderson of Clash thought the song was "misplaced", causing the album to end "on a slightly underwhelming note".

== Composition ==
The song is written in the key of F♯ minor. The verses consist of a chord progression of F♯m, B, E, and A. The end of each verse resolves with C♯7 and C♯7sus4 chords back to back, with the latter a half step down from the former. The chorus consists of modulated mixes of the verse chords, a chord progression of F♯m, D, A, and C♯7.

== Charts ==
=== Weekly charts ===
2016 weekly chart performance for "House of Memories"
Chart (2016)	Peak position
US Hot Rock & Alternative Songs (Billboard)	27

2022 weekly chart performance for "House of Memories"
Chart (2022)	Peak position
Austria (Ö3 Austria Top 40)	11
Czech Republic Singles Digital (ČNS IFPI)	13
Germany (GfK)	12
Global 200 (Billboard)	106
Greece International (IFPI Greece)	29
Hungary (Single Top 40)	15
Hungary (Stream Top 40)	13
Lithuania (AGATA)	54
Netherlands (Single Top 100)	92
Norway (VG-lista)	30
Portugal (AFP)	156
Slovakia Singles Digital (ČNS IFPI)	20
Sweden (Sverigetopplistan)	76
Switzerland (Schweizer Hitparade)	32
UK Audio Streaming (Official Charts)	79

=== Year-end charts ===
2022 year-end chart performance for "House of Memories"
Chart (2022)	Position
Austria (Ö3 Austria Top 40)	53
Germany (Official German Charts)	78
Hungary (Stream Top 40)	89

== Certifications ==
Certifications for "House of Memories"
Region	Certification	Certified units/sales
Canada (Music Canada)	Platinum	80,000^{‡}
Denmark (IFPI Danmark)	Gold	45,000^{‡}
France (SNEP)	Platinum	200,000^{‡}
Italy (FIMI)	Gold	50,000^{‡}
New Zealand (RMNZ)	Platinum	30,000^{‡}
Poland (ZPAV)	2× Platinum	100,000^{‡}
Spain (Promusicae)	Gold	30,000^{‡}
United Kingdom (BPI)	Platinum	600,000^{‡}
United States (RIAA)	Platinum	1,000,000^{‡}
^{‡} Sales+streaming figures based on certification alone.
