= Death of a Bachelor =

2016 studio album by Panic! at the Disco

Studio album by Panic! at the Disco
- Released: January 15, 2016
- Recorded: April 2015
- Studio: Urielectric Studios
- Genres: Pop rock; jazz; alternative rock; power pop; R&B
- Length: 36:06
- Labels: Fueled by Ramen; DCD2; Crush
- Producers: Jake Sinclair; J.R. Rotem; Imad Royal

Panic! at the Disco chronology
Too Weird to Live, Too Rare to Die! (2013)	Death of a Bachelor (2016)	All My Friends We're Glorious (2017)

Singles from Death of a Bachelor
- 1. "Hallelujah" Released: April 20, 2015; 2. "Victorious" Released: September 29, 2015; 3. "Emperor's New Clothes" Released: October 21, 2015; 4. "Death of a Bachelor" Released: December 9, 2015

Death of a Bachelor is the fifth studio album by Panic! at the Disco, and their first as a solo project, released on January 15, 2016, by Fueled by Ramen and DCD2. It is the follow-up to the band's fourth studio album, Too Weird to Live, Too Rare to Die! (2013), with the entire album written and recorded by vocalist and multi-instrumentalist Brendon Urie, who collaborated with other writers including Jake Sinclair, Morgan Kibby, Lolo, and Sam Hollander. It is the band's first album to not feature drummer Spencer Smith and also follows bassist Dallon Weekes' departure from the official line-up, having become a touring member once again.

Death of a Bachelor debuted at number one on the US Billboard 200, with 190,000 album units, earning Panic! its best sales week and first number one album. The album has been certified double platinum by the Recording Industry Association of America (RIAA) for sales of at least 2,000,000 copies. It was nominated for the Grammy Award for Best Rock Album at the 59th Annual Grammy Awards.

== Writing and composition ==
In an interview with Entertainment Tonight, Urie stated that Death of a Bachelor was lyrically inspired by his wife Sarah Urie and his lifestyle, stating: "This whole album was written at my house where she and I live and it reflects very much the lifestyle I was living [while writing it], which is so different from who I used to be." In an interview with Alt 98.7 in mid-2015, he had to say about the album: "It's going to be a little bit different, it's this mix between Sinatra and Queen, if that makes any sense...Every time we do a new album, for me, it's always evolving and changing—in the best way. There's going to be a new energy live."

In April 2015, Urie began recording Death of a Bachelor. A small studio had been built and a piano was bought specifically for the album's production. Production was handled by Jake Sinclair and Urie. Sinclair, who is a friend of Urie's, helped him view the music in "different ways". Urie said he "loved" working in the studio, often running between that and the piano. He played every instrument minus the horns, which he also "love[d]". His views had "all changed from [Too Weird to Live, Too Rare to Die!]", having "different things" he wanted to discuss.

On October 22, 2015, Brendon Urie released a statement through the band's Facebook page on the background of the album:

When I was a little kid and I heard a song I liked on TV, I would jump up and run to the piano to try and figure it out by ear. When I was 10 or 11, I built myself a drum kit in the garage made out of empty laundry detergent buckets, old lawn chairs, paint cans, and old trash cans. Around that time, my parents got me my first guitar. A baby acoustic. I jumped between all of these instruments constantly to satisfy the ideas I heard in my head. At this young age, I realized that music would play a huge part in my life. I had no idea.

'Death of a Bachelor' is in honor of those times I spent alone as a kid. Allowing music to consume me. Playing everything myself just to get the idea right and out of my head. It's a beginning to a new era. And an homage to how it all began.

This album is me. Running to the piano. Building a drum kit. Strumming a guitar.

Some things never change.

On January 6, 2016, in an interview with Mixdown magazine, Urie commented on bassist Dallon Weekes' move from the official lineup.

Dallon has been playing with us for a long time, and I'm so grateful for that. Sometimes, you try working creatively with people, and it doesn't always work out the way you think it will. In this case, it ended up just being better to have someone to tour with. It's an oversight sometimes, but you have to have people that you connect with and get along with. Touring can be long and it can be intense – you need people that will see you through that. Dallon has been that for me.

On the day of the titular track's premiere Brendon Urie said on social media:

Frank Sinatra turns 100 this year. I attach his music to so many memories: Opening presents on Christmas day, my grandparents teaching the rest of the family to swing dance, watching Who Framed Roger Rabbit with my siblings (Sinatra makes a cameo in the form of a cartoon sword singing "Witchcraft"). His music has been a major player in the soundtrack of my life. So it's only right that I return the favor and/or pay it forward. I wrote a new album this year and even in the few songs that don't sound remotely similar to any of his music I still felt his influence in the writing and the need to relate so personally to each song. "Death Of A Bachelor" is very important to me. It expresses the bittersweet (but mostly sweet) end of an era. A look back at a part of my life now deceased. An "It's A Wonderful Life"-esque look into a possibly different future. But mostly an appreciation for the present.

Urie also stated in an interview with Upset magazine that he feels that the song is "very jazzy, very Sinatra esque.. but then put it with this beat that sounds like Beyoncé's Drunk in Love". The song is also where Urie got the album title from.

Only one song was cut from the album, "Night Birds" described as a "...Driving arena-rocker with a flashy guitar solo". Urie described the song as "A little too early Butch Walker, but definitely not as good" in an interview with Alternative Press.

== Release ==
"Hallelujah" was released as the lead single on April 20, 2015, and serviced to alternative radio. A lyric video was uploaded on the same day and the official music video premiered on July 7, 2015. "Death of a Bachelor" was premiered on Beats 1 on Apple Music by Pete Wentz on September 1, 2015. "Victorious", co-written and produced by CJ Baran, was released for digital download on September 29, 2015, as the second single from the album "Emperor's New Clothes" and its music video was released for digital download on October 21, 2015, as the third official single to coincide with the album's announcement.

The official music video for "Death of a Bachelor" was released on YouTube on December 24, 2015. On December 31, 2015, the band made "Don't Threaten Me with a Good Time" available for streaming. On January 15, 2016, the band premiered the rest of its tracks on its YouTube channel at the same time the album was released. The band went on the Weezer & Panic! at the Disco Summer Tour 2016 with Weezer to promote both of their new albums. On September 22, 2016, the official music video for LA Devotee was released on the band's YouTube channel to coincide with the announcement of the Death of a Bachelor Tour.

== Critical reception ==
Professional ratings
Aggregate scores
Source	Rating
AnyDecentMusic?	5.9/10
Metacritic	69/100
Review scores
Source	Rating
AllMusic	4.5/5 stars
Alternative Press	4/5 stars
The A.V. Club	B
DIY	4/5 stars
Entertainment Weekly	B−
The Guardian	2/5 stars
PopMatters	7/10
Q	2/5 stars
Rolling Stone	3/5 stars
USA Today	2.5/4 stars

Death of a Bachelor received generally positive reviews from music critics. It holds an average score of 69/100 on Metacritic, indicating "generally favorable reviews". In a positive review, The New York Times commented on the album's second single, "Victorious", writing that "[Urie] evokes both the flamboyant swagger of Queen and the mechanized gleam of Daft Punk". Evan Lucy in Alternative Press writing, "For all of its precocious, borderline bratty moments, Death of a Bachelor is a remarkably nuanced affair...it's hard not to break out in goosebumps and marvel at the moving songwriting."

Conversely, The Guardian called the album "hollow and shapeless", also stating that "Urie affects a Vegas croon, indicating a desire to reinvent himself as an edgy Michael Bublé", and how "it's unlikely to pay off". Q wrote, "It's a confusing affair, where [Urie] foolishly tries to croon like Frank Sinatra on the title track and never quite nails down whatever the big idea was supposed to be. Still, there are moments to cherish." AbsolutePunk writer Aaron Mook scored the album a 6/10, noting, "It's been a while since I've heard an album that's so divisive in its quality, so manic on one end and so lazy on the other." Consequence of Sound panned the songs "Don't Threaten Me With a Good Time" and "Crazy=Genius", stating that "['Don't Threaten Me With a Good Time'] lazily squashes together a sample of the B-52s' "Rock Lobster" with lackluster lyrics ("Who are these people/ I just woke up in my underwear") out of tune with their surroundings" and that "'Crazy=Genius'...only serves to remind of how many days have gone by and stand in the way of any musical progress".

== Awards and nominations ==
Year	Organization	Award	Result	Ref.
2017	Grammy Awards	Best Rock Album	Nominated	
2018	Billboard Music Awards	Top Rock Album	Nominated	

== Commercial performance ==
The album debuted at number one on the Billboard 200 chart dating February 6, 2016, with 190,000 album-equivalent units. It also earned Panic! at the Disco its best sales week yet for an album, as it sold 169,000 in pure album sales. In its second week, the album fell to number 5 on the Billboard 200 while selling 39,000 equivalent album units (down 79 percent). It was the twelfth best-selling album of 2016 with 506,000 copies sold, which also made it the second best selling rock album of 2016. Including streams and tracks sales, the album has totaled 845,000 units in the United States in 2016. The album was also certified 2× platinum by the Recording Industry Association of America (RIAA) for combined sales and album-equivalent units of over two million units in the United States.

== Track listing ==
Songwriting credits per booklet.

No.	Title	Writer(s)	Producer(s)	Length
1.	"Victorious"	Brendon Urie; Christopher J. Baran; Mike Viola; White Sea; Jake Sinclair; Alex DeLeon; Rivers Cuomo	Sinclair; Suzy Shinn^{[a]}	2:58
2.	"Don't Threaten Me with a Good Time"	Jonathan Rotem; Teal Douville; Carl Lehman; Jerker Hansson; Urie; Sinclair; Amir Salem; Catherine Pierson; Frederick Schneider; Julian Strickland; Cynthia Wilson; Rick Wilson	J.R. Rotem; Sinclair	3:33
3.	"Hallelujah"	Urie; Aron Wright; Imad Royal; White Sea; Sinclair; Robert William Lamm	Sinclair	3:00
4.	"Emperor's New Clothes"	Urie; Sinclair; Lauren Pritchard; Sam Hollander; Dan Wilson	Sinclair	2:38
5.	"Death of a Bachelor"	Urie; Pritchard; Sinclair	Sinclair; Shinn^{[a]}	3:23
6.	"Crazy=Genius"	Urie; Hollander; Sinclair	Sinclair; Shinn^{[a]}	3:18
7.	"LA Devotee"	Urie; White Sea; Sinclair	Sinclair; Shinn^{[a]}; White Sea^{[a]}	3:16
8.	"Golden Days"	Urie; Hollander; Sinclair	Sinclair; Shinn^{[a]}	4:14
9.	"The Good, the Bad and the Dirty"	Urie; Pritchard; Sinclair	Sinclair; Shinn^{[a]}	2:50
10.	"House of Memories"	Urie; White Sea; Sinclair	Sinclair; White Sea^{[a]}	3:28
11.	"Impossible Year"	Urie; Hollander; Sinclair	Sinclair	3:22
Total length:				36:06

Notes

- ^{^[a]} signifies an additional producer.
- "Don't Threaten Me with a Good Time" samples "Rock Lobster" by The B-52's
- "Hallelujah" samples "Questions 67 and 68" by Chicago

== Personnel ==
Adapted from the album booklet.

Panic! at the Disco

- Brendon Urie – vocals, guitar, bass, keyboards, drums on all songs except "Hallelujah", background vocals on "Hallelujah", creative and art direction

Additional musicians and production

- Rob Mathes – horn arrangement, conductor, piano on "Impossible Year"
- Andy Snitzer – tenor saxophone
- Dave Mann – tenor saxophone
- Aaron Heick – alto saxophone
- Dave Riekenberg – baritone saxophone
- Mike Davis – tenor trombone
- Randy Andos – bass trombone
- Jeff Kievit – trumpet
- Tony Kadleck – trumpet on "Death of a Bachelor", "Crazy=Genius", "LA Devotee", "Golden Days" and "Impossible Year"; flugelhorn
- Dylan Schwab – trumpet on "Victorious", "The Good, the Bad and the Dirty" and "House of Memories"
- White Sea – background vocals on "Victorious", "Hallelujah", additional production on "LA Devotee" and "House of Memories"
- Mark Stepro – drums on "Hallelujah"
- Nicole Guice – creative and art direction
- Zack Cloud Hall – cover photography
- Shervin Lainez – portrait photography
- The Visual Strategist – layout
- Jake Sinclair – producer on all tracks, background vocals on "Victorious", "Hallelujah"
- JR Rotem – producer on "Don't Threaten Me with a Good Time"
- Imad Royal – producer on "Hallelujah"
- Suzy Shinn – additional production on "Victorious", "Death of a Bachelor", "Crazy=Genius", "LA Devotee", "Golden Days" and "The Good, the Bad and the Dirty", engineer, background vocals on "Victorious", "Death of a Bachelor", "Crazy=Genius", "LA Devotee", "Golden Days" and "The Good, the Bad and the Dirty"
- Claudius Mittendorfer – mixing on all songs except "Hallelujah"
- Michael Brauer – mixing on "Hallelujah"
- Pete Lyman – mastering on all songs except "Hallelujah"
- Joe LaPorta – mastering on "Hallelujah"

== Charts ==
=== Weekly charts ===
Chart (2016–21)	Peak position
Australian Albums (ARIA)	3
Austrian Albums (Ö3 Austria)	15
Belgian Albums (Ultratop Flanders)	14
Belgian Albums (Ultratop Wallonia)	88
Canadian Albums (Billboard)	3
Dutch Albums (Album Top 100)	14
Finnish Albums (Suomen virallinen lista)	22
German Albums (Offizielle Top 100)	23
Hungarian Albums (MAHASZ)	25
Irish Albums (IRMA)	4
Italian Albums (FIMI)	66
New Zealand Albums (RMNZ)	4
Norwegian Albums (VG-lista)	20
Scottish Albums (Official Charts)	4
Spanish Albums (Promusicae)	46
Swedish Albums (Sverigetopplistan)	27
Swiss Albums (Schweizer Hitparade)	41
UK Albums (Official Charts)	4
US Billboard 200	1
US Top Rock Albums (Billboard)	1
US Top Alternative Albums (Billboard)	1

=== Year-end charts ===
Chart (2016)	Position
Australian Albums (ARIA)	78
UK Albums (OCC)	48
US Billboard 200	23
US Top Rock Albums (Billboard)	3
Chart (2017)	Position
US Billboard 200	49
US Top Rock Albums (Billboard)	6
Chart (2018)	Position
US Billboard 200	106
US Top Rock Albums (Billboard)	13
Chart (2019)	Position
US Top Rock Albums (Billboard)	38

== Certifications ==
Region	Certification	Certified units/sales
Canada (Music Canada)	Platinum	80,000^{‡}
Denmark (IFPI Danmark)	Platinum	20,000^{‡}
New Zealand (RMNZ)	Platinum	15,000^{‡}
United Kingdom (BPI)	Platinum	300,000^{‡}
United States (RIAA)	2× Platinum	2,000,000^{‡}
^{‡} Sales+streaming figures based on certification alone.

== See also ==
- List of Billboard 200 number-one albums of 2016
- Weezer & Panic! at the Disco Summer Tour 2016
- Death of a Bachelor Tour
