= Death of a Bachelor (song) =

Single by Panic! at the Disco

from the album Death of a Bachelor
- Released: December 9, 2015
- Recorded: 2015
- Genre: EDM; jazz; soul; synth-pop
- Length: 3:23
- Label: Fueled by Ramen; DCD2
- Songwriters: Brendon Urie; Lauren Pritchard; Jake Sinclair
- Producer: Jake Sinclair

Panic! at the Disco singles chronology
"Emperor's New Clothes" (2015)	"Death of a Bachelor" (2015)	"Say Amen (Saturday Night)" (2018)

Music video
- "Death of a Bachelor" on YouTube

"Death of a Bachelor" is a song by American solo project Panic! at the Disco from the solo project's fifth studio album of the same name. The song premiered during an Apple Music broadcast hosted by Pete Wentz on September 1, 2015. A music video for the song was uploaded to Fueled by Ramen's YouTube channel on December 24, 2015. It was later sent to alternative, hot adult contemporary and pop radio as the album's fourth and final single.

== Background ==
The introduction features a sample of "Gettin' It In" by Jadakiss. Vocalist Brendon Urie stated, "Frank Sinatra turns 100 this year. I attach his music to so many memories: Opening presents on Christmas day, my grandparents teaching the rest of the family to swing dance, watching Who Framed Roger Rabbit with my siblings (Sinatra makes a cameo in the form of a cartoon sword singing 'Witchcraft'). His music has been a major player in the soundtrack of my life. So it's only right that I return the favor and/or pay it forward. I wrote a new album this year and even in the few songs that don't sound remotely similar to any of his music I still felt his influence in the writing and the need to relate so personally to each song. 'Death Of A Bachelor' is very important to me. It expresses the bittersweet (but mostly sweet) end of an era. A look back at a part of my life now deceased. An 'It's A Wonderful Life'-esque look into a possibly different future. But mostly an appreciation for the present." The song's sound has been described as "Sinatra-gone-EDM", "jazz/soul", and synth-pop.

Urie also stated in an interview with Upset magazine that he feels that the song is "very jazzy, very Sinatra esque.. but then put it with this beat that sounds like Beyoncé's 'Drunk in Love'".

== Music video ==
A music video for the track was released on December 24, 2015. As of December 2022, the music video has surpassed 164 million views.

== Promotion ==
Brendon Urie performed the song on Good Morning America on October 20, 2016, along with "LA Devotee," and on The Ellen DeGeneres Show on February 9, 2017.

== Charts ==
=== Weekly charts ===
Chart (2016)	Peak position
US Billboard Hot 100	92
US Hot Rock & Alternative Songs (Billboard)	11

=== Year-end charts ===
Chart (2016)	Position
US Hot Rock Songs (Billboard)	31

== Certifications ==
Region	Certification	Certified units/sales
Canada (Music Canada)	Platinum	80,000^{‡}
New Zealand (RMNZ)	Platinum	30,000^{‡}
United Kingdom (BPI)	Gold	400,000^{‡}
United States (RIAA)	3× Platinum	3,000,000^{‡}
^{‡} Sales+streaming figures based on certification alone.
