= Emperor's New Clothes (song) =

2015 single by Panic! at the Disco

Single by Panic! at the Disco

from the album Death of a Bachelor
- Released: October 21, 2015
- Recorded: 2015
- Genre: Dance-rock
- Length: 2:38
- Label: DCD2
- Songwriters: Brendon Urie; Jake Sinclair; Lauren Pritchard; Sam Hollander; Dan Wilson
- Producer: Jake Sinclair

Panic! at the Disco singles chronology
"Victorious" (2015)	"Emperor's New Clothes" (2015)	"Death of a Bachelor" (2016)

Music video
- "Emperor’s New Clothes" on YouTube

"Emperor’s New Clothes" is a song by American solo project Panic! at the Disco released as the third single from the project's fifth studio album, Death of a Bachelor, on October 21, 2015 through Fueled by Ramen and DCD2.

The song was written by Brendon Urie, Jake Sinclair, Lauren Pritchard, Sam Hollander and Dan Wilson. It was produced by Jake Sinclair. The music video for the song was uploaded to YouTube the day of its release, and serves as a sequel to the music video of "This Is Gospel". "Emperor's New Clothes" was nominated for Best Track at the 2016 Kerrang! Awards.

== Music video ==
The music video for the song "Emperor's New Clothes" was uploaded to Fueled by Ramen's official YouTube page on October 21, 2015. The video was directed by Daniel "Cloud" Campos, who produced and directed Panic! at the Disco's music video for "This is Gospel", from the album Too Weird to Live, Too Rare to Die! (2013). The music video takes place following the events that happened in the video for "This is Gospel" and sees Urie's transition at the moment when his body dies and his soul heads off into a white light. "Emperor's New Clothes" takes over as Brendon is in Heaven searching through the white light and fog, only to fall through a trap door down into Hell. He becomes the new devil from materials (dust) around him; turning his skin grey, and at the end is smiling evilly while the red light surrounds him as screams of the damned and loud thumping is heard from off screen.

"Emperor's New Clothes" was named Video of the Year on Rock Sound's annual reader's poll in 2015. "Emperor's New Clothes" won the award for Best Music Video at the 2016 Alternative Press Music Awards. The music video has over 300 million views as of June 2023, making it the most watched video of Death of a Bachelor.

== Charts ==
=== Weekly charts ===
Chart (2015–2016)	Peak position
Canada Hot 100 (Billboard)	89
Scottish Singles Sales (Official Charts)	49
UK Singles (Official Charts)	88
US Billboard Hot 100	68
US Hot Rock & Alternative Songs (Billboard)	5

=== Year-end charts ===
Chart (2015)	Position
US Hot Rock Songs (Billboard)	81
Chart (2016)	Position
US Hot Rock Songs (Billboard)	25

== Certifications ==
Region	Certification	Certified units/sales
Canada (Music Canada)	Gold	40,000^{‡}
New Zealand (RMNZ)	Gold	15,000^{‡}
United Kingdom (BPI)	Gold	400,000^{‡}
United States (RIAA)	2× Platinum	2,000,000^{‡}
^{‡} Sales+streaming figures based on certification alone.
