= LA Devotee =

Promotional single by Panic! at the Disco

from the album Death of a Bachelor
- Published: Listen to This Shhhh, Songs Music Publishing, BMG Platinum Songs, Manes and Reins Publishing
- Released: November 26, 2015
- Recorded: 2015
- Genre: Alternative rock; power pop; ska
- Length: 3:16
- Label: Fueled by Ramen; DCD2
- Songwriters: Brendon Urie; White Sea; Jake Sinclair
- Producer: Jake Sinclair

Music video
- "LA Devotee" on YouTube

"LA Devotee" is a song by American rock solo project Panic! at the Disco. It was released as the first promotional single from the project’s fifth studio album, Death of a Bachelor, on November 26, 2015 (Thanksgiving Day) through Fueled by Ramen and DCD2. The song was written by Brendon Urie, White Sea and Jake Sinclair and was produced by Sinclair.

== Background ==
The song's inspiration derives from Urie's passion for Los Angeles and is about someone who has fallen in love with L.A. and will stop at nothing to survive and succeed in the city. A video of the audio for "LA Devotee" was uploaded to Fueled by Ramen's official YouTube channel on the day of its release, November 26, 2015. It has been streamed over 55 million times on YouTube and over 262 million times on Spotify as of December 2022.

== Music video ==
The song's official music video was released September 22, 2016, starring Noah Schnapp, a child actor known for his role as Will Byers in the Netflix series Stranger Things. The video starts with a young girl played by Anna Sachtleben nervously trying to cross a field with a dog barking in the background. The girl falls down and gets kidnapped by an unknown cloaked figure as the camera shows a shot of the mysterious "Join Us" logo cropped into the field. The next scene shows a young boy (Schnapp) being strapped to a chair singing the song while experiencing bizarre things, with Brendon also singing the song on a screen. The young girl also makes an appearance forcing the boy to drink a Eucharist. The last scene shows four cloaked figures strapping two mechanisms to the boy, causing him to be electrocuted and then suffer a seizure. Afterwards, the video ends with Brendon walking up to him with rubber gloves in a menacing manner. It is unknown what Brendon is to do next.

Between shots of Schnapp being tortured, several disturbing images can be seen, including men with animal heads, blood poured over a skull, children with black holes for their eyes, and a symbol of the Church of Satan (featuring Baphomet's head inside an inverted pentagon) projected over Urie's face.

== Other references ==
The song references multiple places in the Great Los Angeles area, including:

- Mulholland Drive
- Hollywood Shrine

== Charts ==
=== Weekly charts ===
Chart (2015–16)	Peak position
US Hot Rock Songs (Billboard)	15

=== Year-end charts ===
Chart (2016)	Position
US Hot Rock Songs (Billboard)	57

== Certifications ==
Region	Certification	Certified units/sales
Canada (Music Canada)	Gold	40,000^{‡}
New Zealand (RMNZ)	Gold	15,000^{‡}
United Kingdom (BPI)	Silver	200,000^{‡}
United States (RIAA)	Platinum	1,000,000^{‡}
^{‡} Sales+streaming figures based on certification alone.
