= Victorious (Panic! at the Disco song) =

Single by Panic! at the Disco

from the album Death of a Bachelor
- Released: September 29, 2015
- Recorded: 2015
- Genre: Pop; pop rock; power pop; synth-pop
- Length: 2:59
- Label: Fueled by Ramen; DCD2
- Songwriters: Brendon Urie; Mike Viola; White Sea; Jake Sinclair; Alexander DeLeon; Rivers Cuomo; CJ Baran
- Producers: Jake Sinclair; Suzy Shinn^{[a]}

Panic! at the Disco singles chronology
"Hallelujah" (2015)	"Victorious" (2015)	"Emperor's New Clothes" (2015)

Music video
- "Victorious" on YouTube

"Victorious" is a song by American solo project Panic! at the Disco released as the second single from the band's fifth studio album, Death of a Bachelor, on September 29, 2015 by Fueled by Ramen and DCD2. The song was written by Brendon Urie, CJ Baran, Mike Viola, White Sea, Jake Sinclair, Alex DeLeon, and Rivers Cuomo and was produced by Sinclair with additional production by Suzy Shinn. A music video for the song was released on YouTube on November 13, 2015. It was the final song released during Dallon Weekes's tenure in the band, though it was never confirmed if he played bass on the single. Notably, "Victorious" was the band's first single in almost 10 years to chart on Billboard Pop Songs chart, since 2006's "I Write Sins Not Tragedies".

== Music video ==
The music video for "Victorious" was released onto Fueled by Ramen's official YouTube page on November 13, 2015. It was directed by Brandon Dermer. The video depicts Panic! at the Disco's lead vocalist Brendon Urie in a boxing match against a large brute, and winning. However, after not calling his girlfriend, she breaks up with him. He loses his self esteem, but wins a large check for it. He then becomes the victor in more situations, such as helping an elderly lady across the street, and despite losing a dodgeball game, taking home a young lady. As of December 2022, the music video has over 84 million views.

== Personnel ==
Personnel taken from Death of a Bachelor liner notes, and Sound on Sound.

Panic! at the Disco

- Brendon Urie – vocals, guitar, bass, keyboards, drums

Additional musicians and production

- Rob Mathes – horn arrangement, conductor
- Andy Snitzer – tenor saxophone
- Dave Mann – tenor saxophone
- Aaron Heick – alto saxophone
- Dave Riekenberg – baritone saxophone
- Mike Davis – tenor trombone
- Randy Andos – bass trombone
- Jeff Kievit – trumpet
- Dylan Schwab – trumpet
- Tony Kadleck – flugelhorn
- White Sea – background vocals
- Jake Sinclair – producer, background vocals
- Suzy Shinn – additional production, engineer, background vocals
- Claudius Mittendorfer – mixing
- Pete Lyman – mastering

== Charts ==
=== Weekly charts ===
Chart (2015–2016)	Peak position
US Billboard Hot 100	89
US Adult Pop Airplay (Billboard)	31
US Pop Airplay (Billboard)	30
US Hot Rock & Alternative Songs (Billboard)	7

=== Year-end charts ===
Chart (2015)	Position
US Hot Rock Songs (Billboard)	67
Chart (2016)	Position
US Hot Rock Songs (Billboard)	23

== Certifications ==
Region	Certification	Certified units/sales
Canada (Music Canada)	Gold	40,000^{‡}
New Zealand (RMNZ)	Gold	15,000^{‡}
United Kingdom (BPI)	Gold	400,000^{‡}
United States (RIAA)	2× Platinum	2,000,000^{‡}
^{‡} Sales+streaming figures based on certification alone.

== Release history ==
United States	October 1, 2015	Alternative radio	Fueled by Ramen
United States	February 2, 2016	Mainstream radio	DCD2; Atlantic
