= Don't Threaten Me with a Good Time =

Promotional single by Panic! at the Disco

from the album Death of a Bachelor
- Released: December 31, 2015
- Recorded: 2015
- Genre: Pop rock; surf rock; synth-pop; hip hop
- Length: 3:33
- Label: Fueled by Ramen; DCD2
- Songwriters: J.R. Rotem; Teal Douville; Carl Lehman; Jerker Hansson; Brendon Urie; Jake Sinclair; Amir Salem; Kate Pierson; Frederick Schneider; Julian Strickland; Cynthia Wilson; Ricky Wilson
- Producers: J.R. Rotem; Jake Sinclair

Music video
- "Don't Threaten Me with a Good Time" on YouTube

"Don't Threaten Me with a Good Time" is a song by American rock band Panic! at the Disco released as the second promotional single from the band's fifth studio album, Death of a Bachelor (2016), released on December 31, 2015. The song features a sample of "Rock Lobster" by new wave band The B-52's. The song is featured in the NBA 2K18 soundtrack.

== Background ==
"Don't Threaten Me with a Good Time" was announced on New Year's Eve 2015 through Panic! at the Disco's official Twitter account. The video of the audio track was uploaded to Fueled By Ramen's official YouTube channel on the same day of its release. An official music video for the song was uploaded on May 10, 2016. As of January 2025, the music video has surpassed 64 million views.

== Charts ==
=== Weekly charts ===
Chart (2016)	Peak position
UK Rock & Metal (OCC)	1
US Bubbling Under Hot 100 (Billboard)	6
US Hot Rock & Alternative Songs (Billboard)	10

=== Year-end charts ===
Chart (2016)	Position
US Hot Rock Songs (Billboard)	29

== Certifications ==
Region	Certification	Certified units/sales
Canada (Music Canada)	Gold	40,000^{‡}
New Zealand (RMNZ)	Gold	15,000^{‡}
United Kingdom (BPI)	Gold	400,000^{‡}
United States (RIAA)	2× Platinum	2,000,000^{‡}
^{‡} Sales+streaming figures based on certification alone.
