= Panic! at the Disco discography =

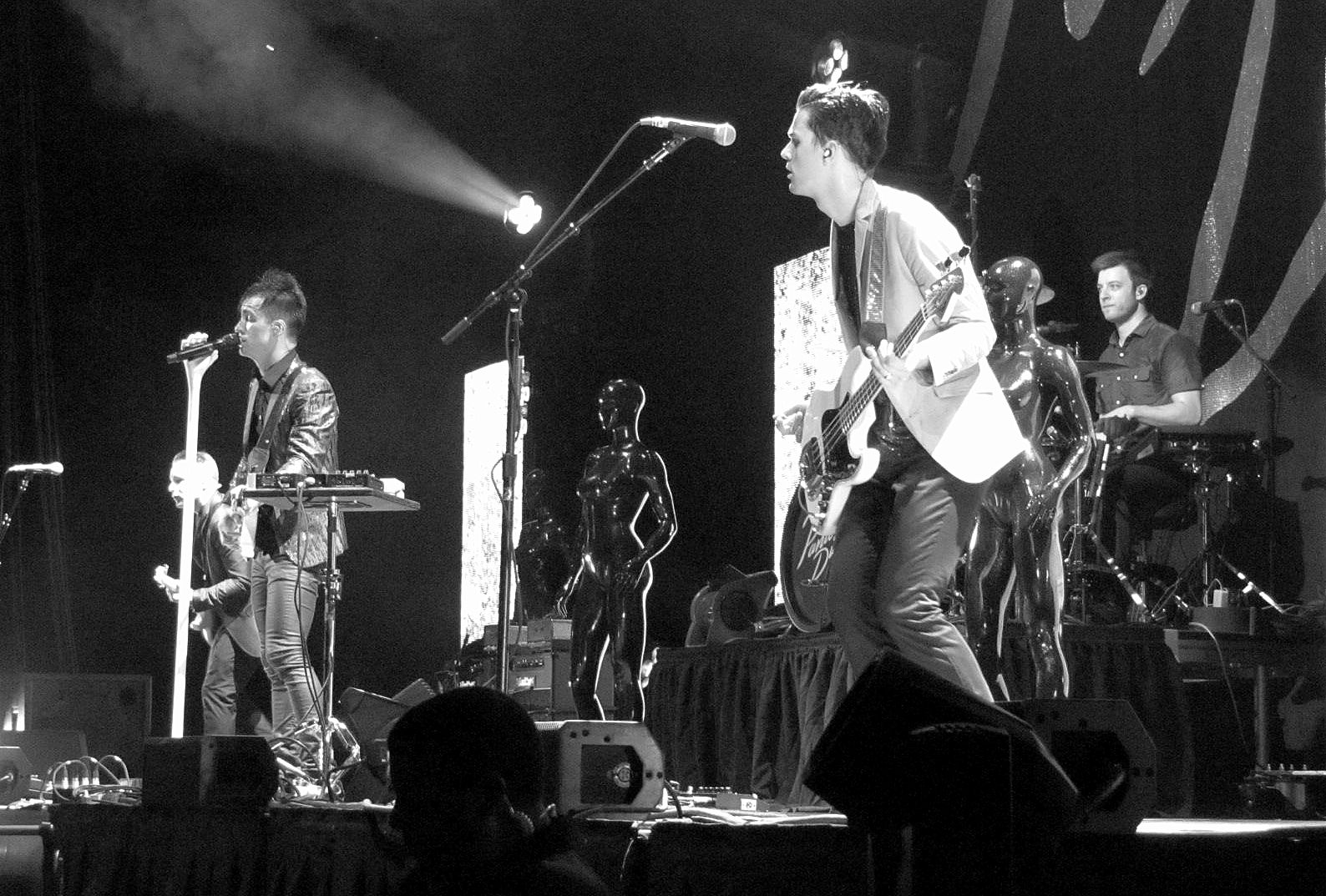
- Panic! at the Disco performing in 2013
- Studio albums: 7
- Extended plays: 1
- Live albums: 4
- Compilation albums: 2
- Singles: 29
- Music videos: 36
- Promotional singles: 6

The American pop rock band Panic! at the Disco has released seven studio albums, one extended play, two compilation albums, four live albums, 29 singles, 36 music videos, and six promotional singles. Their 2005 debut album, A Fever You Can't Sweat Out, reached number 13 on the US Billboard 200, and has been certified 4× platinum by the RIAA for sales of four million copies in the United States since its September 2005 release, spearheaded by the 8× platinum top-10 hit single, "I Write Sins Not Tragedies". The band's second album, Pretty. Odd., was released on March 25, 2008, debuting and peaking at number 2 and was certified platinum by RIAA.

Their third effort, Vices & Virtues, was released on March 22, 2011, and peaked at number 7 in the US and was certified gold by RIAA, following lead single "The Ballad of Mona Lisa". Their fourth album, 2013's Too Weird to Live, Too Rare to Die!, entered and peaked at number 2 on the US chart, and contained successful singles "Miss Jackson", "This Is Gospel", and "Girls / Girls Boys", which all were certified platinum or higher in the US. The band's fifth studio album, Death of a Bachelor, was released in January 2016 and became their first number-one album in the US and was certified 2× platinum by the RIAA. Their sixth album, Pray for the Wicked, was released on June 22, 2018, and debuted at number one on the US Billboard 200. It has been certified 2× platinum by RIAA. Their seventh and final album, Viva Las Vengeance was released in August 2022, preceding Panic! at the Disco's dissolution the following year.

== Albums ==
=== Studio albums ===
List of studio albums, with selected chart positions, sales figures and certifications
Title	Album details	Peak chart positions										Sales	Certifications
Title	Album details	US	AUS	AUT	BEL (FL)	CAN	GER	NLD	NZ	SWI	UK	Sales	Certifications
A Fever You Can't Sweat Out	Released: September 27, 2005; Label: Decaydance/Fueled by Ramen (4513-12077); Format: CD, CS, DL, LP	13	11	37	43	—	98	41	7	63	17	UK: 402,983	RIAA: 4× Platinum; ARIA: Platinum; BPI: Platinum; MC: Platinum; RMNZ: 2× Platinum
Pretty. Odd.	Released: March 25, 2008; Label: Decaydance/Fueled by Ramen (430524); Format: CD, DL, LP	2	1	5	34	2	13	41	5	71	2		RIAA: Platinum; BPI: Gold; MC: Gold
Vices & Virtues	Released: March 22, 2011; Label: Decaydance/Fueled by Ramen (526748); Format: CD, DL, LP	7	6	51	71	17	64	76	21	90	29		RIAA: Gold; BPI: Silver
Too Weird to Live, Too Rare to Die!	Released: October 8, 2013; Label: Decaydance/Fueled by Ramen (536949); Format: CD, DL, LP	2	26	70	79	8	99	77	15	—	10		RIAA: Platinum; BPI: Gold; MC: Gold; RMNZ: Gold
Death of a Bachelor	Released: January 15, 2016; Label: Fueled by Ramen/DCD2 (553138); Format: CD, DL, LP	1	3	15	14	3	23	14	4	41	4		RIAA: 2× Platinum; BPI: Platinum; MC: Platinum; RMNZ: Platinum
Pray for the Wicked	Released: June 22, 2018; Label: Fueled by Ramen/DCD2 (B07BMDQMQX); Format: CD, DL, LP, CS	1	1	3	10	1	8	6	2	13	2		RIAA: 2× Platinum; ARIA: Gold; BPI: Gold; MC: Platinum; NVPI: Gold; RMNZ: Platinum
Viva Las Vengeance	Released: August 19, 2022; Label: Fueled by Ramen/DCD2, Warner; Format: CD, DL, LP	13	10	46	20	70	18	34	—	46	5		
"—" denotes a release that did not chart.

=== Live albums ===
List of live albums
Title	Album details	Peak chart positions
Title	Album details	US
Live Session (iTunes Exclusive)	Released: June 13, 2006; Label: Decaydance Records/Fueled by Ramen; Format: DL	—
...Live in Chicago	Released: December 2, 2008; Label: Decaydance Records/Fueled by Ramen; Format: CD+DVD-V, DL	—
iTunes Live	Released: September 27, 2011; Label: Decaydance Records/Fueled by Ramen; Format: DL	—
All My Friends, We're Glorious: Death of a Bachelor Tour Live	Released: December 15, 2017; Label: Decaydance Records/Fueled by Ramen; Format: DL, LP	185
Live in Denver	Released: October 20, 2025; Label: Decaydance Records/Fueled by Ramen; Format: DL, LP	—

=== Compilation albums ===
List of compilation albums
Title	Album details
Introducing... Panic at the Disco	Released: May 19, 2008; Label: Decaydance Records/Fueled by Ramen; Format: DL
Panic! at the Disco Video Catalog	Released: March 1, 2011; Label: Decaydance Records/Fueled by Ramen; Format: DL

== Extended plays ==
List of extended plays
Title	EP details
Nicotine EP	Released: May 6, 2014; Label: Decaydance/Fueled by Ramen; Format: DL
Live in the Studio	Released: July 6, 2018; Label: Decaydance/Fueled by Ramen; Format: DL
House of Memories EP	Released: October 28, 2022; Label: Decaydance/Fueled by Ramen; Format: DL

== Singles ==
List of singles, with selected chart positions and certifications, showing year released and album name
Title	Year	Peak chart positions										Certifications	Album
Title	Year	US	AUS	BEL (FL)	CAN	GER	IRL	NLD	NZ	POR	UK	Certifications	Album
"I Write Sins Not Tragedies"	2006	7	12	— (Note: "I Write Sins Not Tragedies" did not enter the Flanders Ultratop 50, but peaked at number 12 on the Ultratip chart.)	— (Note: "I Write Sins Not Tragedies" did not enter the Billboard Canadian Hot 100, but peaked at number 20 on the Canada All-Format Airplay chart.)	66	50	45	5	16	25	RIAA: Diamond; BPI: 2× Platinum; BVMI: Gold; MC: 4× Platinum; RMNZ: 3× Platinum	A Fever You Can't Sweat Out
"But It's Better If You Do"	2006	— (Note: "But It's Better If You Do" did not enter the US Billboard Hot 100, but peaked at number four on the Bubbling Under Hot 100 Singles chart.)	15	—	—	—	—	89	10	—	23	RIAA: Platinum; BPI: Silver	A Fever You Can't Sweat Out
"Lying Is the Most Fun a Girl Can Have Without Taking Her Clothes Off"	2006	— (Note: "Lying Is the Most Fun a Girl Can Have Without Taking Her Clothes Off" did not enter the US Billboard Hot 100, but peaked at number four on the Bubbling Under Hot 100 Singles chart.)	26	—	—	—	—	—	33	—	39	RIAA: Platinum; BPI: Gold; RMNZ: Gold	A Fever You Can't Sweat Out
"Build God, Then We'll Talk"	2007	—	—	—	—	—	—	—	—	—	—	RIAA: Gold	A Fever You Can't Sweat Out
"Nine in the Afternoon"	2008	51	19	— (Note: "Nine in the Afternoon" did not enter the Flanders Ultratop 50, but peaked at number four on the Ultratip chart.)	48	—	39	86	28	13	13	RIAA: 3× Platinum; ARIA: Gold; BPI: Gold; MC: Gold; RMNZ: Gold	Pretty. Odd.
"Mad as Rabbits"	2008	—	—	—	—	—	—	—	—	—	—		Pretty. Odd.
"That Green Gentleman (Things Have Changed)"	2008	— (Note: "That Green Gentleman (Things Have Changed)" did not enter the Billboard Hot 100, but peaked at number five on the Hot Singles Sales chart.)	—	—	—	—	—	—	—	—	96		Pretty. Odd.
"Northern Downpour"	2008	—	—	—	—	—	—	—	—	—	—		Pretty. Odd.
"New Perspective"	2009	— (Note: "New Perspective" did not enter the US Billboard Hot 100, but peaked at number four on the Bubbling Under Hot 100 Singles chart.)	69	—	78	—	—	—	—	—	—	BPI: Silver	Jennifer's Body soundtrack
"The Ballad of Mona Lisa"	2011	89	21	—	—	—	—	—	—	—	43	RIAA: Platinum; ARIA: Gold; BPI: Gold; RMNZ: Gold	Vices & Virtues
"C'mon" (with fun.)	2011	— (Note: "C'mon" did not enter the Billboard Hot 100, but peaked at number 12 on the Hot Singles Sales chart.)	—	—	—	—	—	—	—	—	—		non-album single
"Ready to Go (Get Me Out of My Mind)"	2011	—	69	—	—	—	—	—	—	—	—	RIAA: Gold	Vices & Virtues
"Mercenary"	2011	—	—	—	—	—	—	—	—	—	—		Batman: Arkham City – The Album
"Let's Kill Tonight"	2011	—	—	—	—	—	—	—	—	—	—	RIAA: Gold	Vices & Virtues
"Miss Jackson" (featuring Lolo)	2013	68	—	—	73	—	—	—	—	—	61	RIAA: 2× Platinum; BPI: Silver; MC: Gold	Too Weird to Live, Too Rare to Die!
"This Is Gospel"	2013	87	—	—	95	—	—	—	—	—	159	RIAA: 3× Platinum; BPI: Gold; MC: Gold; RMNZ: Gold	Too Weird to Live, Too Rare to Die!
"Girls / Girls / Boys"	2013	—	—	—	—	—	—	—	—	—	—	RIAA: Platinum; BPI: Silver	Too Weird to Live, Too Rare to Die!
"Hallelujah"	2015	40	—	—	72	—	—	—	—	—	81	RIAA: Platinum; BPI: Silver; MC: Gold; RMNZ: Gold	Death of a Bachelor
"Victorious"	2015	89	—	—	—	—	—	—	—	—	194	RIAA: 2× Platinum; BPI: Gold; MC: Gold; RMNZ: Gold	Death of a Bachelor
"Emperor's New Clothes"	2015	68	116	—	89	—	—	—	—	—	88	RIAA: 2× Platinum; BPI: Gold; MC: Gold; RMNZ: Gold	Death of a Bachelor
"Death of a Bachelor"	2015	92	—	—	—	—	—	—	—	—	143	RIAA: 3× Platinum; BPI: Gold; MC: Platinum; RMNZ: Platinum	Death of a Bachelor
"Say Amen (Saturday Night)"	2018	60	90	—	— (Note: "Say Amen (Saturday Night)" did not enter the Billboard Canadian Hot 100, but peaked at number 48 on the Canadian Digital Song Sales chart.)	—	—	—	— (Note: "Say Amen (Saturday Night)" did not enter the NZ Top 40 Singles Chart, but peaked at number two on the NZ Heatseeker Singles Chart.)	—	48	RIAA: Platinum; ARIA: Gold; BPI: Silver; MC: Gold; RMNZ: Gold	Pray for the Wicked
"High Hopes"	2018	4	7	2	5	5	13	5	16	23	12	RIAA: Diamond; ARIA: 5× Platinum; BPI: 4× Platinum; BVMI: 3× Gold; BRMA: Platinum; MC: 9× Platinum; NVPI: Platinum; RMNZ: 5× Platinum; SNEP: Diamond	Pray for the Wicked
"Hey Look Ma, I Made It"	2019	16	127	— (Note: "Hey Look Ma, I Made It" did not enter the Flanders Ultratop 50, but peaked at number six on the Ultratip chart.)	51	—	—	68	— (Note: "Hey Look Ma, I Made It" did not enter the NZ Top 40 Singles Chart, but peaked at number six on the NZ Heatseeker Singles Chart.)	—	86	RIAA: 2× Platinum; BPI: Silver; MC: 2× Platinum; RMNZ: Gold	Pray for the Wicked
"Viva Las Vengeance"	2022	—	—	—	—	—	—	—	— (Note: "Viva Las Vengeance" did not enter the NZ Top 40 Singles Chart, but peaked at number 32 on the NZ Hot Singles Chart.)	—	—		Viva Las Vengeance
"Middle of a Breakup"	2022	—	—	—	—	—	—	—	—	—	—		Viva Las Vengeance
"Local God"	2022	—	—	—	—	—	—	—	—	—	—		Viva Las Vengeance
"Don't Let the Light Go Out"	2022	— (Note: "Don't Let the Light Go Out" did not enter the US Billboard Hot 100, but peaked at number 46 on the Digital Song Sales chart.)	—	—	—	—	—	—	—	—	— (Note: "Don't Let the Light Go Out" did not enter the UK Singles Chart, but peaked at number 12 on the UK Singles Sales Chart.)		Viva Las Vengeance
"—" denotes a release that did not chart or was not released in that territory.

=== Promotional singles ===
List of promotional singles, with selected chart positions and certifications, showing year released and album name
Title	Year	Peak chart positions										Certifications	Album
Title	Year	US	AUS	CAN	IRL	ISR	JPN	KOR	SCO	SGP	UK	Certifications	Album
"The Only Difference Between Martyrdom and Suicide Is Press Coverage"	2005	77	—	—	—	—	—	—	—	—	—	RIAA: Platinum; BPI: Gold	A Fever You Can't Sweat Out
"LA Devotee"	2015	—	—	—	—	—	—	—	—	—	189	RIAA: Platinum; BPI: Silver; MC: Gold	Death of a Bachelor
"Don't Threaten Me with a Good Time"	2015	— (Note: "Don't Threaten Me with a Good Time" did not enter the US Billboard Hot 100, but peaked at number six on the Bubbling Under Hot 100 Singles chart.)	—	—	—	—	—	—	—	—	154	RIAA: 2× Platinum; BPI: Gold; MC: Gold	Death of a Bachelor
"(Fuck A) Silver Lining"	2018	—	—	—	—	—	—	—	91	—	—	RIAA: Gold	Pray for the Wicked
"King of the Clouds"	2018	—	—	—	—	—	—	—	—	—	—	RIAA: Gold	Pray for the Wicked
"The Greatest Show"	2018	— (Note: "The Greatest Show" did not enter the US Billboard Hot 100, but peaked at number five on the Bubbling Under Hot 100 Singles chart.)	120	— (Note: "The Greatest Show" did not enter the Billboard Canadian Hot 100, but peaked at number 40 on the Canadian Digital Song Sales chart.)	82	—	—	—	44	—	39	RIAA: Gold; BPI: Silver	The Greatest Showman: Reimagined
"Into the Unknown"	2019	98	— (Note: "Into the Unknown" did not enter the ARIA Top 100 Singles Chart, but peaked at number 36 on the ARIA Digital Track Chart.)	— (Note: "Into the Unknown" did not enter the Billboard Canadian Hot 100, but peaked at number 33 on the Canadian Digital Song Sales chart.)	88	21	47	2	32	5	74	RIAA: Platinum; BPI: Silver; RMNZ: Gold	Frozen II
"—" denotes a release that did not chart or was not released in that territory.

== Other charted and certified songs ==
List of songs, with selected chart positions and certifications, showing year released and album name
Title	Year	Peak chart positions										Certifications	Album
Title	Year	US	AUS	CZR	GER	NLD	NOR	SWE	SWI	UK	WW	Certifications	Album
"Camisado"	2005	—	—	—	—	—	—	—	—	—	—	RIAA: Gold	A Fever You Can't Sweat Out
"Time to Dance"	2005	—	—	—	—	—	—	—	—	—	—	RIAA: Gold	A Fever You Can't Sweat Out
"There's a Good Reason These Tables Are Numbered Honey, You Just Haven't Thought of It Yet"	2005	—	—	—	—	—	—	—	—	—	—	RIAA: Gold	A Fever You Can't Sweat Out
"Sarah Smiles"	2011	—	—	—	—	—	—	—	—	—	—	RIAA: Gold	Vices & Virtues
"Casual Affair"	2013	—	—	—	—	—	—	—	—	—	—	RIAA: Gold	Too Weird to Live, Too Rare to Die!
"Collar Full"	2013	—	—	—	—	—	—	—	—	—	—	RIAA: Gold	Too Weird to Live, Too Rare to Die!
"Nicotine"	2013	—	—	—	—	—	—	—	—	—	—	RIAA: Platinum	Too Weird to Live, Too Rare to Die!
"Vegas Lights"	2013	—	—	—	—	—	—	—	—	—	—	RIAA: Gold	Too Weird to Live, Too Rare to Die!
"Crazy=Genius"	2016	—	—	—	—	—	—	—	—	194	—	RIAA: Gold; BPI: Silver	Death of a Bachelor
"Golden Days"	2016	—	—	—	—	—	—	—	—	—	—	RIAA: Gold	Death of a Bachelor
"The Good, the Bad, and the Dirty"	2016	—	—	—	—	—	—	—	—	—	—	RIAA: Gold	Death of a Bachelor
"House of Memories"	2016	—	—	13	12	92	30	76	32	— (Note: "House of Memories" did not enter the UK Singles Chart, but peaked at number 79 on the UK Streaming Chart.)	106	RIAA: Platinum; BPI: Platinum; RMNZ: Platinum; SNEP: Platinum	Death of a Bachelor
"Impossible Year"	2016	—	—	—	—	—	—	—	—	—	—	RIAA: Gold	Death of a Bachelor
"Bohemian Rhapsody" (Queen cover)	2016	64	64	—	—	—	—	—	—	80	—	RIAA: Gold	Suicide Squad: The Album
"Roaring 20s"	2018	—	—	—	—	—	—	—	—	—	—	RIAA: Gold	Pray for the Wicked
"—" denotes a release that did not chart or was not released in that territory.

== Other releases ==
List of songs formally released but absent from streaming services
Song	Year	Notes
"The Only Difference Between Martyrdom and Suicide Is Press Coverage" (Tommie Sunshine Brooklyn Fire Remix)	2006	Snakes on a Plane: The Album
"This Is Halloween"	2006	The Nightmare Before Christmas
"It's Almost Halloween"	2008	Original Halloween music video for Fueled by Ramen's Myspace and YouTube channel.
"Feels Like Christmas"	2017	Only released on the band's website and YouTube channel.

== Guest appearances ==
Song	Year	Release	Artist
"7 Minutes in Heaven (Atavan Halen)"	2005	From Under the Cork Tree	Fall Out Boy
"The Exit"	2008	Razia's Shadow	Forgive Durden
"The End at the Beginning"	2008	Razia's Shadow	Forgive Durden
"Open Happiness"	2008	Advertisement for Coca-Cola, featured with members of Fueled By Ramen	
"One of THOSE Nights"	2008	Whisper War	The Cab
"Nearly Witches" (as The Paul Revere Jumpsuit Apparatus)	2008	CitizensFOB Mixtape: Welcome to the New Administration	Fall Out Boy
"20 Dollar Nosebleed"	2009	Folie à Deux	Fall Out Boy
"What a Catch, Donnie"	2009	Folie à Deux	Fall Out Boy
"Love in the Middle of a Firefight"	2014	Money Sucks, Friends Rule	Dillion Francis
"Keep on Keeping On"	2014	Non-album single	Travie McCoy
"Molly"	2015	Professional Rapper	Lil Dicky
"West End Kids"	2015	Vikings	New Politics
"It Remembers"	2016	Low Teens	Every Time I Die
"Roses" (with Juice Wrld)	2018	Friends Keep Secrets	Benny Blanco
"Earth"	2019	Non-album single	Lil Dicky
"Me!"	2019	Lover	Taylor Swift
"Into the Unknown"	2019	Frozen 2	
"Neon", "Lights On", "Your Tears Are Mine"	2022	Luxury Disease	One Ok Rock

== Unreleased songs ==
Title	Length	Year	Notes
"It's True Love"		2007	This song was written and scrapped before the release of Pretty. Odd. It was performed live on July 7, 2007 at Summerfest.
"Lullaby"	2:01	2009	Demo written for Pete Wentz's son.
"Freckles"		2010	Song co-written with Rivers Cuomo of Weezer. Cuomo has said of the song, "Brendon brought some text from one of his co-writers or friends. A kind of free form poem thingy. It was about a girl with freckles." It was recorded but has never been leaked, aside from its lyrics in June 2023. It was intended for the album Vices & Virtues.
"Back Around"	3:26	2013	Unreleased song from around the time of Too Weird to Live, Too Rare to Die!'s recording.
"Hooked on a Feeling"	3:34	2013	Unreleased song from around the time of Too Weird to Live, Too Rare to Die!'s recording.
"Little Secret"	3:06	2013	Unreleased song from around the time of Too Weird to Live, Too Rare to Die!'s recording.
"One This Time"	3:00	2013	Unreleased song from around the time of Too Weird to Live, Too Rare to Die!'s recording. (Leaked December 10, 2023) This song was accidentally played at the House of Memories VIP lounge in 2017, prior to being fully leaked.
"If I Were You (I Really Wouldn't Do That)"	4:09	2014	Unreleased song from Death of a Bachelor. (Leaked June 29, 2023)
"Night Birds"	3:23	2014	Unreleased song from Death of a Bachelor. (Leaked June 29, 2023) This song was pulled from the track list shortly before the album's release.
"Praying"	3:01	2014	Unreleased song from Death of a Bachelor. (Leaked June 29, 2023)
"Tied to the Tracks"	3:40	2014	Unreleased song from Death of a Bachelor. (Leaked June 29, 2023)
"Exes on TV"	1:25	2016	Unreleased song played on one of Brendon Urie's Periscopes. Possibly a demo of High Hopes due to musical similarities.
"My Bloody Valentine"	3:01	2016	An experimental song played during Brendon Urie's Twitch stream.
"Diamonds and Daggers"	3:19	2017	Unreleased song from Pray for the Wicked. (Leaked June 29, 2023); The song's intro is lifted from the film Goodfellas. The lyric "My tell-tale heart's a hammer in my chest, cut me a silk-tie tourniquet" was repurposed in "Roaring 20s."
"Metal Song"	2:00	2019	Previewed on Urie's charity livestream for the Highest Hopes Foundation.
"Doesn't Feel Like Christmas Time"	2:12	2020	Unreleased song played during Brendon Urie's Twitch stream. (December 24, 2020)
"California"	2:44	2022	Unreleased song from around the time of Viva Las Vengeance's recording.
"Y-O-U Don't Want Me"	3:25	2022	Unreleased song from around the time of Viva Las Vengeance's recording.

== Music videos ==
Year	Song	Director
2006	"I Write Sins Not Tragedies"	Shane Drake
2006	"But It's Better If You Do"	Shane Drake
2006	"Lying Is the Most Fun a Girl Can Have Without Taking Her Clothes Off"	Travis Kopach
2007	"Build God, Then We'll Talk"	Unknown
2008	"Nine in the Afternoon"	Shane Drake
2008	"Mad as Rabbits"	Shane Valdés
2008	"That Green Gentleman (Things Have Changed)"	Alan Ferguson
2008	"Northern Downpour"	Behn Fannin
2008	"It's Almost Halloween"	Unknown
2009	"New Perspective"	Kai Regan
2011	"The Ballad of Mona Lisa"	Shane Drake
2011	"The Overture"	Shane Drake
2011	"Ready to Go (Get Me Out of My Mind)"	Shane Drake
2011	"Let's Kill Tonight"	Unknown
2013	"Miss Jackson"	Jordan Bahat
2013	"This Is Gospel"	Daniel Cloud Campos
2013	"Girls / Girls / Boys"	DJay Brawner
2014	"Nicotine"	Kai Regan
2014	"This Is Gospel (Piano Version)"	Scantron & Mel Soria
2015	"Hallelujah"	NORTON
2015	"Emperor's New Clothes"	Daniel Cloud Campos
2015	"Victorious"	Brandon Dermer
2015	"Death of a Bachelor"	Scantron & Mel Soria
2016	"Don't Threaten Me with a Good Time"	Tim Hendrix
2016	"LA Devotee"	Scantron & Mel Soria
2018	"Say Amen (Saturday Night)"	Daniel Cloud Campos & Spencer Susser
2018	"Hey Look Ma, I Made It"	Brandon Dermer
2018	"High Hopes"	Brendan Walter & Mel Soria
2019	"Dancing's Not a Crime"	Brandon Dermer
2019	"Into the Unknown"	Janell Shirtcliff
2022	"Viva Las Vengeance"	Brendan Walter
2022	"Middle Of A Breakup"	Brendan Walter
2022	"Don't Let The Light Go Out"	Brendan Walter
2022	"Sad Clown"	Brendan Walter
2022	"Sugar Soaker"	Brendan Walter
2022	"Do It To Death"	Brendan Walter

=== Guest appearances ===
Year	Song	Artist	Director
2007	"Clothes Off!!"	Gym Class Heroes	
2008	"Open Happiness"	Coca-Cola Company	
2008	"One of THOSE Nights"	The Cab	
2009	"What a Catch, Donnie"	Fall Out Boy	Alan Ferguson
2009	"A Weekend At Pete Rose's" ("Headfirst Slide into Cooperstown on a Bad Bet")	Fall Out Boy	Shane Valdés
2010	"Pretty Melody"	Butch Walker	
