= ...Live in Chicago =

Live album by Panic at the Disco
- Released: December 2, 2008
- Recorded: May 23 and 24, 2008
- Length: 59:52
- Labels: Decaydance; Fueled by Ramen
- Producer: Rob Mathes

Panic at the Disco chronology
Pretty. Odd. (2008)	...Live in Chicago (2008)	Vices & Virtues (2011)

Professional ratings
Review scores
Source	Rating
Allmusic	3.5/5 stars

...Live in Chicago is a live album and concert film by American pop rock band Panic at the Disco. Released on December 2, 2008, it documents the band's performances at the Congress Theater in Chicago, Illinois, on May 23 and 24 on the 2008 Honda Civic Tour. At the time of its release the band dropped the exclamation mark from its band name; this would be the last release by the band with the exclamation name dropped.

== Track listing ==
=== CD content ===
All lyrics by Ryan Ross, except "Folkin' Around" by Brendon Urie. All music by Ross, Spencer Smith, Urie, and Jon Walker, except where noted.

No.	Title	Music	Original release	Length
1.	"We're So Starving"		Pretty. Odd. (2008)	1:50
2.	"Nine in the Afternoon"		Pretty. Odd. (2008)	2:53
3.	"But It's Better If You Do"	Ross, Smith, Urie	A Fever You Can't Sweat Out (2005)	3:49
4.	"Camisado"	Ross, Smith, Urie	A Fever You Can't Sweat Out (2005)	3:23
5.	"She's a Handsome Woman"		Pretty. Odd. (2008)	3:23
6.	"The Only Difference Between Martyrdom and Suicide Is Press Coverage"	Ross, Smith, Urie	A Fever You Can't Sweat Out (2005)	3:13
7.	"Behind the Sea"		Pretty. Odd. (2008)	4:19
8.	"Lying Is the Most Fun a Girl Can Have Without Taking Her Clothes Off"	Ross, Smith, Urie	A Fever You Can't Sweat Out (2005)	3:05
9.	"I Constantly Thank God for Esteban"	Ross, Smith, Urie	A Fever You Can't Sweat Out (2005)	4:13
10.	"That Green Gentleman (Things Have Changed)"		Pretty. Odd. (2008)	3:14
11.	"There's a Good Reason These Tables Are Numbered Honey, You Just Haven't Thought of It Yet"	Ross, Smith, Urie	A Fever You Can't Sweat Out (2005)	4:06
12.	"Folkin' Around"		Pretty. Odd. (2008)	1:54
13.	"I Write Sins Not Tragedies"	Ross, Smith, Urie	A Fever You Can't Sweat Out (2005)	3:18
14.	"Northern Downpour"		Pretty. Odd. (2008)	4:54
15.	"Time to Dance"	Ross, Smith, Urie	A Fever You Can't Sweat Out (2005)	3:54
16.	"Pas de Cheval"		Pretty. Odd. (2008)	2:49
17.	"Mad as Rabbits"		Pretty. Odd. (2008)	5:42
Total length:				59:52

Deluxe edition
No.	Title	Length
18.	"Do You Know What I'm Seeing?" (alternate version)	3:57
19.	"Behind the Sea" (alternate version)	2:26
20.	"She Had the World" (alternate version)	3:45
21.	"The Piano Knows Something I Don't Know" (alternate version)	2:21
Total length:		72:19

=== DVD content ===
- Live performance
- In the Days – This is a documentary-like segment which includes a sneak-peek behind the scenes during the Chicago stop on the tour.
- Music videos
1. "Nine in the Afternoon"
2. "That Green Gentleman (Things Have Changed)"
3. "Mad as Rabbits"
4. "Northern Downpour"
- The making of music videos
1. "Nine in the Afternoon"
2. "That Green Gentleman (Things Have Changed)"
3. "Northern Downpour"

== Personnel ==
Panic at the Disco

- Brendon Urie – vocals, guitars, tambourine; bass guitar on "Mad as Rabbits"
- Ryan Ross – vocals, guitars, tambourine
- Jon Walker – bass guitar, backing vocals; guitar on "Mad as Rabbits"
- Spencer Smith – drums, percussion, tambourine, backing vocals on "Northern Downpour"

Additional personnel

- Eric Ronick (of Black Gold) – keyboards, backing vocals, percussion
