= That Green Gentleman (Things Have Changed) =

Single by Panic at the Disco

from the album Pretty. Odd.
- B-side: "She Had the World" (alternate version): "When The Day Met The Night"
- Released: May 2, 2008
- Recorded: 2007
- Genre: Rock; pop
- Length: 3:15
- Label: Fueled by Ramen; Decaydance
- Composers: Ryan Ross; Jon Walker; Brendon Urie; Spencer Smith
- Lyricist: Ryan Ross
- Producer: Rob Mathes

Panic at the Disco singles chronology
"Mad as Rabbits" (2008)	"That Green Gentleman (Things Have Changed)" (2008)	"It's Almost Halloween" (2008)

Alternative cover
- Promotional single cover

Music video
- "That Green Gentleman (Things Have Changed)" on YouTube

"That Green Gentleman (Things Have Changed)" (often shortened to "That Green Gentleman") is a song by American rock band Panic! at the Disco, from their second studio album Pretty. Odd. The song was the second song written by the band after they decided to scrap an album's worth of material, but was not played with "When the Day Met the Night" and "Nine in the Afternoon" at the various festivals Panic performed at during the summer of 2007.

The title of the album was already decided before the line, "Things are shaping up to be pretty odd" was written.

The song was performed (as well as "She's a Handsome Woman", and "Mad as Rabbits") on every date of the European tour prior to the album's release.

The song was also performed during the June 12, 2008, episode of FNMTV, hosted by Fall Out Boy's Pete Wentz.

== Music video ==
On February 10, 2008, MTV released an interview with Panic announcing "That Green Gentleman (Things Have Changed)" as the third single from Pretty. Odd. They also stated that the music video will include the band at different stages in their lives.

The video was recorded as part of a deal with Nokia, a deal comparable to that of Fall Out Boy's "Thnks fr th Mmrs" video, The Academy Is...' "We've Got a Big Mess on Our Hands" and Paramore's "That's What You Get". The video premiered exclusively on Nokiausa.com on May 2, 2008.

The video, directed by Alan Ferguson, begins with a child version of band member Ryan Ross (played by Cameron Boyce) opening matryoshka dolls. When he opens the last doll, the members of the band come out and jump off the desk. They then land in a field and find various musical instruments. After playing them for a while, they suddenly open up (in the style of matryoshka dolls) themselves and child versions of themselves come out.

The child versions of the band start running in the hills, while older versions ride penny-farthings and sing in a row boat. The child versions of the band start rolling down a hill in a life-sized matryoshka doll and then opening once more to be elderly versions of the band, who, according to the director of the video, are "the old '06 Panic!". The versions in the rowboat, he said, would be considered "the new Pretty. Odd. Panic". The video ends with the band members rowing the boat into the sunset, along with a zoom-out scene of the matryoshka dolls.

== Track listing ==
All lyrics by Ryan Ross, all music by Panic at the Disco.

=== UK 3" CD single ===
1. "That Green Gentleman (Things Have Changed)"

=== UK Digipak CD single ===
1. "That Green Gentleman (Things Have Changed)"
2. "She Had the World" (Alternate version)

=== US 7" single ===
1. "That Green Gentleman (Things Have Changed)"
2. "When the Day Met the Night"

=== US promotional single ===
1. "That Green Gentleman (Things Have Changed)" (album version) – 3:15

=== UK promotional single ===
1. "That Green Gentleman (Things Have Changed)" (album version) – 3:15

== Charts ==
Chart (2008)	Peak position
UK Singles (Official Charts)	96
US Hot Singles Sales (Billboard)	16
