= It's Almost Halloween =

2008 song by Panic! at the Disco

Single by Panic! at the Disco
- Released: October 28, 2008
- Recorded: October 2008
- Genre: Halloween music
- Length: 3:54
- Label: Decaydance; Fueled by Ramen

Panic! at the Disco singles chronology
"That Green Gentleman (Things Have Changed)" (2008)	"It's Almost Halloween" (2008)	"Northern Downpour" (2008)

Music video
- "It's Almost Halloween" on YouTube

"It's Almost Halloween" is a song by American rock band Panic! at the Disco. The song was released as a digital download on October 25, 2008, through Decaydance and Fueled by Ramen.

== Background and recording ==
It was our version of doing a Christmas song. Halloween definitely fit Panic! better at that time, and with Halloween you don't have to compete with Mariah Carey and Josh Groban.

— Panic! at the Disco drummer Spencer Smith on "It's Almost Halloween".

"It's Almost Halloween" features lead vocals by Panic! at the Disco guitarist Ryan Ross and vocalist Brendon Urie. According to the band's drummer, Spencer Smith, the song's vocals were recorded in a bathroom, as "purely a result of being on tour and having to make the most of what you have to work with." Describing the genesis of the song, Smith stated, "We were really just trying to have fun. Doing something less composed and orchestrated felt different and unexpected for us at that point. Also, around that time Ryan was wanting to sing more, so doing that on a casual, fun song seemed like a low pressure way to ease into it."

== Music video ==
A music video for the song was uploaded on YouTube on October 25, 2008, by Panic! at the Disco's label, Fueled by Ramen. Filmed outside of St. Louis in Defiance, Missouri, in a forested area and at an indoor Halloween party, the video features the members of the band dressed in Halloween costumes purchased from a local Party City.

== Critical reception ==
In 2018, the song was ranked number 57 on a PopBuzz list of every Panic! at the Disco song "ranked from worst to best". In 2019, Brii Jamieson of Rock Sound wrote that, "Over the past 11 years, 'It's Almost Halloween' has transcended its cultural bounds, and become a scene staple – a cult classic, the likes of which we haven't seen since."
