= Nine in the Afternoon =

2008 single by Panic! at the Disco

Single by Panic at the Disco

from the album Pretty. Odd.
- B-side: "Pas de Cheval"
- Released: January 29, 2008 (digital)
- Recorded: 2007
- Studio: Studio at the Palms (Las Vegas); Legacy Recording (New York)
- Genre: Pop rock; baroque pop
- Length: 3:11 (album version); 3:12 (radio mix); 3:13 (single version)
- Label: Fueled by Ramen; Decaydance
- Composers: Ryan Ross; Brendon Urie; Jon Walker; Spencer Smith
- Lyricist: Ryan Ross
- Producer: Rob Mathes

Panic at the Disco singles chronology
| "Build God, Then We'll Talk" (2007) | "Nine in the Afternoon" (2008) | "Mad as Rabbits" (2008) |

Music video
- "Nine in the Afternoon" on YouTube

"Nine in the Afternoon" is a song by the American rock band Panic at the Disco, and the lead single from the group's second album Pretty. Odd.. It was the band's first song release that did not include the exclamation mark at the end of the "Panic" in the group's name.

It was the first song written after the band decided to scrap an entire album of songs that the members had been planning to release in autumn 2007. Panic at the Disco's first performance of "Nine in the Afternoon" was at Virgin Festival 2007. The song has undergone changes in key and lyrics since first being performed. This song was number 44 on Rolling Stone's list of the 100 Best Songs of 2008.

On January 29, 2008, at 9:00pm, Panic at the Disco released "Nine in the Afternoon" via the group's MySpace page. Soon after, the band removed the song from that page and added a demo of another song from the new album, "We're So Starving". The following day, Apple added the single for download. The song impacted radio on February 19. As of March, "Nine in the Afternoon" had received moderate radio airplay. It has also been featured in the episode of the NBC television series Heroes titled "Cautionary Tales" and was included in the official television soundtrack album released in early 2008.

The song was covered by The Academy Is..., another Decaydance band, on Warped Tour 2008.

The song is a playable song in the music video game Rock Band 2. It was included on the soundtrack for the video game NHL 09, and was released as downloadable content for the games Just Dance 2 and Lips. It is also on the guitar game Guitar Rock Tour 2.

On the deluxe LP of Pretty. Odd., the song does not have the cymbal hit from the previous track. Instead, it starts with piano.

The song's title comes from an event during a practice session. After playing for a while and not knowing what time it was, Spencer Smith suggested that it was "seven in the afternoon". It was later changed to "nine in the afternoon" to mesh better with the other lyrics.

On the spine of the Australian CD single, the title of the song was misprinted as "Nine in the Morning".

== Music video ==
Screen captures from the music video

According to an advertisement, the concept of the video for the song is a "series of bizarre yet fundamentally recognizable events with the band members." The video contains 40 extras and people will be featured as there are different periods, looks, wardrobe and hair changes. In an MTV interview, it is said that in the video "there are gratuitous fake mustaches involved and a rather bizarre parade being led by the members of the band, who are dressed in what could only be described as 'Sgt. Pepper's-meets-ice-fishing' attire (lots of epaulettes and thermal underwear). Each of them also wears a sash printed with the phrase 'Pretty Odd'." Originally, some of the scenes were supposed to be filmed in a "desert wasteland", but in the writing process, the director made a typing error and spelled out "dessert wasteland". The group decided to adapt that idea. The dessert wasteland shows the band in animal masks. The band members also wear black, red and other colored turtleneck sweaters. The turtlenecks covered up the mask necks and made it seem the band actually had animal heads. The video was filmed from December 20-21, 2007 in Los Angeles, California. It was directed by Shane Drake, who worked on "I Write Sins Not Tragedies" and "But It's Better If You Do".

Many elements of the video relate it to the Beatles. Already mentioned is the Sgt. Pepper attire. The members of the band also each wake up in a different colored room, much like the Beatles had in their movie Help!. The members of the band also wear animal costumes like the Beatles had done for their "I Am the Walrus" video. The sequence where the members run away from a crowd of screaming girls is reminiscent of "A Hard Day's Night".

MTV premiered the music video of "Nine in the Afternoon" on February 10, 2008, at 9:00pm. This date was confirmed earlier during Panic's Final Challenge on MTV's website. The video made its TRL debut the next day.

In July on MTV, it was announced that "Nine in the Afternoon" was nominated for a MTV Video Music Award for Best Pop Video.

== Chart performance ==
In its first week of release, "Nine in the Afternoon" was the most added track at modern rock radio. For the chart week of February 16, 2008, the song debuted at number 29 on the Modern Rock Tracks, at number 79 on the Hot 100, at number 58 on the Canadian Hot 100 and at number 24 on the Australian ARIA Singles Chart. The single debuted at number 13 on the UK Singles Chart on downloads alone, becoming the band's highest charting single in that country at the time. On July 30, 2008, the song was certified gold by the RIAA.

== Personnel ==
Personnel taken from Nine in the Afternoon liner notes.

Panic at the Disco

- Brendon Urie – lead vocals, piano
- Ryan Ross – guitar, vocals
- Jon Walker – bass, vocals
- Spencer Smith – drums, percussion, vocals

Additional musicians

- Rob Mathes – orchestral arrangements
- Sandra Park – concertmaster
- Jeff Kievit – trumpet, piccolo trumpet
- Tony Kadleck – trumpet

Production

- Rob Mathes – producer
- Claudius Mittendorfer – engineer, recording (Studio at the Palms)
- Alex Venguer – orchestra engineer (Legacy Recording)
- Mark Gray – assistant engineer (Studio at the Palms)
- Peter Cobbin – mixing
- Richard Lancaster – mix assistant
- Peter Hutchings – second mix assistant
- Scott Hull – mastering

== Charts ==
| Chart (2008) | Peak position |
|---|---|
| Australia (ARIA) | 19 |
| Belgium (Ultratip Bubbling Under Flanders) | 4 |
| Canada Hot 100 (Billboard) | 48 |
| Canada Rock (Billboard) | 38 |
| Ireland (IRMA) | 39 |
| Netherlands (Single Top 100) | 86 |
| New Zealand (Recorded Music NZ) | 28 |
| Scotland Singles (OCC) | 13 |
| Switzerland Airplay (Schweizer Hitparade) | 68 |
| UK Singles (OCC) | 13 |
| US Billboard Hot 100 | 51 |
| US Adult Pop Airplay (Billboard) | 20 |
| US Alternative Airplay (Billboard) | 8 |

== Certifications ==
| Region | Certification | Certified units/sales |
|---|---|---|
| Australia (ARIA) | Gold | 35,000^{^} |
| Canada (Music Canada) | Gold | 40,000^{‡} |
| New Zealand (RMNZ) | Gold | 15,000^{‡} |
| United Kingdom (BPI) | Gold | 400,000^{‡} |
| United States (RIAA) | 3× Platinum | 3,000,000^{‡} |
^{^} Shipments figures based on certification alone.^{‡} Sales+streaming figures based on certification alone.

== Release history ==
Release dates and formats for "Nine in the Afternoon"
| Region | Date | Format | Label(s) | Ref. |
|---|---|---|---|---|
| United States | March 18, 2008 | Mainstream airplay | Fueled By Ramen | |
