= Downpour =

Downpour may refer to:

- Heavy rain
- Downpour (film), 1971 film by Bahram Beyzai
- Downpour (album), a 1999 music album by Mannafest
- "Downpour", a song from Unbreakable (Backstreet Boys album)
- "Downpour" (song), a 2017 song by I.O.I
- A fictional superhero in the animated series Justice League Unlimited based on the character Zan
- Silent Hill: Downpour, the eighth installment in video game series Silent Hill
- "Northern Downpour", the fourth and final single from Panic! at the Disco's second album, Pretty. Odd.
