= Northern Downpour =

Single by Panic at the Disco

from the album Pretty. Odd.
- B-side: "The Piano Knows Something I Don't Know" (Alternate Version)
- Released: November 14, 2008
- Recorded: 2007–08
- Studio: Studio at the Palms (Las Vegas); Abbey Road Studios (London); Legacy Recording Studios (New York)
- Genre: Folk rock; emo
- Length: 4:07
- Label: Fueled by Ramen; Decaydance
- Composers: Ryan Ross; Spencer Smith; Jon Walker; Brendon Urie
- Lyricist: Ryan Ross
- Producer: Rob Mathes

Panic at the Disco singles chronology
"It's Almost Halloween" (2008)	"Northern Downpour" (2008)	"New Perspective" (2009)

Music video
- "Northern Downpour" on YouTube

"Northern Downpour" is a song by American rock band Panic at the Disco from their second studio album, Pretty. Odd. (2008). The song was released on November 14, 2008, as the fourth and final single from the album. The song was written by guitarist Ryan Ross and bassist Jon Walker, and was their final single with the band.

== Background ==
The lyrics were based on the band's touring cycle, their girlfriends, and "everything that's been important to us in the past few years." In an interview, Ross noted that "There's a line in the song that goes, 'I know the world's a broken bone, but melt your headaches, call it home.' I told Brendon Urie to pay special attention to that line." He characterized it as the album's "most meaningful" song.

== Reception ==
Sarah Rodman at The Boston Globe wrote that the song "combine[s] trippy imagery and dreamy melodies that pay homage without naked, outright theft." The Washington Post's J. Freedom du Lac interpreted the "plaintive ballad" as a reference to the Beatles' "A Day in the Life". Rob Harvilla of The Village Voice felt it "actually quite stirring." Andrew Blackie of PopMatters praised Urie's vocal performance, writing that "he peels off a new timbre to his panting swank entirely, serving an emotionally bare, Robert Smith-esque performance that doesn’t sound like him at all."

James Montgomery of MTV News ranked it among the best songs of 2008, writing that the song is "genuinely pretty [...] and probably the best thing Panic will ever do."

== Music video ==
At the MTV Video Music Awards on September 7, 2008, the band stated that "Northern Downpour" would be the next single released from Pretty. Odd. and that they were working on the concept for the music video. The black and white video was directed by Behn Fannin and produced by Refused TV. It was filmed in Los Angeles in late September 2008.

The music video, which is in black-and-white and directed by Behn Fannin, begins with Ryan Ross playing his guitar and someone digging with a spade. The camera zooms out to reveal the band playing the song in a field. Then the lyrics "Fantastic posing greed" are seen painted on a billboard in the middle of a city, with a man looking up towards it. The lyrics "We should feed our jewelry to the sea" also appear on a billboard. The lyrics "Fabled Foreign Tongues" appear on the front page of a newspaper that a man sitting on a park bench is reading. The lyrics "Northern Downpour" are written on a mirror in a public restroom.

Spencer Smith then tapes "Hey moon" onto everybody's car bumper in a parking lot and runs away. Spray cans are then seen being dropped by Ross, who runs around a corner, after having spray-painted the lyrics "I missed your skin when you were east" on a wall, which soon appears on the news with the headline "Strange Graffiti in the Tri-County Area". A news reporter interviews an eyewitness about it, who has "You clicked your heels and wished for me" printed on his shirt. After this, there are more shots of the band playing, while young people are digging around them. More lyrics appear in even more places.

Afterwards, Jon Walker is seen attaching the lyrics "My one and lonely", which are painted on plastic tags, to security cameras in parking lots, then he runs away. Lyrics are now painted on streets and freeways by Brendon Urie, and the band sneak into two skyscrapers, turning on the lights in such a way that they form the lyrics "Hey moon". The band gets hold of a searchlight and project the lyrics "Hey moon" onto the night sky. The final shot takes place in the field where the band is playing. The lyrics "Never yawn" are seen carved into the field.

== Credits and personnel ==
Credits adapted from the liner notes of Pretty. Odd., Fueled by Ramen and Decaydance Records.

Recording locations

- Music recording – Studio at the Palms (Las Vegas); Abbey Road Studios (London); Legacy Recording Studios (New York)
- Mixing – Abbey Road Studios (London)

Personnel

- Songwriting – Ryan Ross (lyrics), Panic at the Disco (music)
- Production – Rob Mathes
- Engineering – Mark Everton Gray
- Assistant engineer – Claudius Mittendorfer
- Mixing – Peter Cobbin
- Mixing assistants – Richard Lancaster, Peter Hutchings
