= Pretty. Odd. =

2008 album by Panic at the Disco

Studio album by Panic at the Disco
- Released: March 21, 2008
- Recorded: September 2007 – February 2008
- Studios: Studio at the Palms (Paradise, Nevada); Abbey Road (London); Legacy Recording (New York)
- Genres: Psychedelic pop; baroque pop; pop rock; psychedelic rock; folk rock
- Length: 48:46
- Labels: Decaydance; Fueled by Ramen
- Producer: Rob Mathes

Panic at the Disco chronology
A Fever You Can't Sweat Out (2005)	Pretty. Odd. (2008)	...Live in Chicago (2008)

Singles from Pretty. Odd.
- 1. "Nine in the Afternoon" Released: January 29, 2008; 2. "Mad as Rabbits" Released: March 25, 2008; 3. "That Green Gentleman (Things Have Changed)" Released: May 2, 2008; 4. "Northern Downpour" Released: November 14, 2008

Pretty. Odd. is the second studio album by American pop rock band Panic at the Disco, first released in the Netherlands on March 21, 2008, and released in the US on March 25, 2008, by Decaydance and Fueled by Ramen. Recorded at the Studio at the Palms in Paradise, Nevada with additional production at Abbey Road Studios in London with producer Rob Mathes, the album was inspired by baroque pop and the works of the Beach Boys and the Beatles, with its psychedelic-styled rock sound differing greatly from the techno-influenced pop-punk of the band's previous album A Fever You Can't Sweat Out (2005). It is the band's only major release to not feature an exclamation point in their name, being credited as "Panic at the Disco" for all major activities until summer the following year.

To begin work on the record, Panic at the Disco retreated to a cabin in the rural mountains of Mount Charleston, in the group's native state of Nevada. Upon growing dissatisfied with their final product, the band scrapped the entire album and spent time writing and recording Pretty. Odd. throughout the following winter. Production came together quickly and each song written made the cut. Additional recording, such as strings and horns, were produced at Abbey Road Studios. It is the only album to feature bassist Jon Walker, and last to feature lead guitarist and primary songwriter Ryan Ross as both left the band in 2009, a year after the album's release.

The record received a generally positive critical response, but under-performed commercially in the aftermath of its quadruple-platinum-selling predecessor, instead only achieving platinum status. The album spent 18 weeks on the Billboard 200, peaking at number two, and the album's lead single "Nine in the Afternoon" was certified triple platinum by the RIAA. The album has since gathered a cult following and sold 600,000 copies worldwide by June 2008.

== Background ==
=== Cricket & Clover ===
The group, fresh off the major success of their debut A Fever You Can't Sweat Out, took a break after non-stop touring and began formulating ideas for their next record together during the winter of 2006. After a short period of development regarding the ideas of the album, the band arrived at a cabin in the rural mountains of Mount Charleston, Nevada in March 2007 to begin the writing process for the new album. At the time, the band set a tentative release date for autumn and had not yet settled on a producer. By April, the band had four songs completed and planned to leave the cabin to head to Los Angeles to continue work on what Ross called "a modern fairy tale with a romantic twist." Shortly before departing from the area, bassist Jon Walker remarked the album would be similar to a concept album and that the entire band would be involved in writing (all previous material had been composed by guitarist Ryan Ross). "Nearly Witches (Ever Since We Met...)" was also written for this album; however, it was rejected for inclusion for Pretty. Odd., due to not fitting within the concept of the album. Urie and Smith later finished the song for the band's next studio album Vices & Virtues (2011).

=== Pretty. Odd. ===
When the group began settling back in Los Angeles in June 2007, they began tracking the album, and at that point, eight new songs had been written. After recording the new tracks and performing them live over the summer, the band returned to their native Las Vegas as well as their old rehearsal studio, where they had written their debut record. During this time, the band picked producer Rob Mathes to work on the album, who had previously worked with them on a cover of "This Is Halloween" from The Nightmare Before Christmas (1993). The band grew uninterested in the songs previously written and by August scrapped the entire new album (which Ross later revealed was "three-quarters" done) and started over. "We wanted to approach these songs in the most basic form," Ross said. "We wrote them all on one acoustic guitar and with someone singing. I think that we kind of skipped that part of songwriting on the first record, and this time we're sort of paying attention to that. […] We've written a bunch of songs since we've been home [Las Vegas]. I think it's the most fun and the happiest we've been since we started." With simplicity the new focus and the old album shelved, the group settled in and began recording what would become Pretty. Odd.

== Recording and production ==
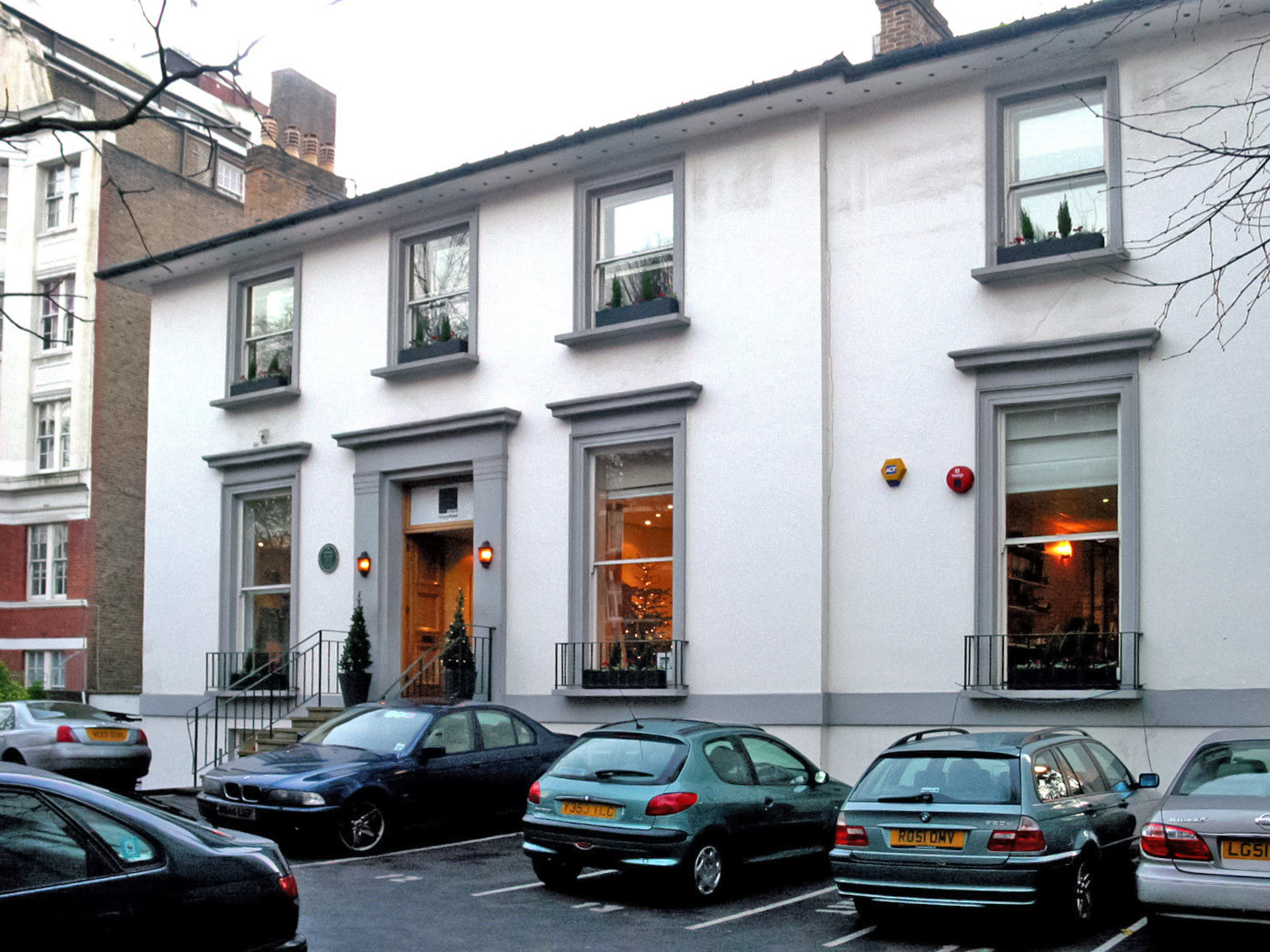
Abbey Road Studios, where Pretty. Odd. completed production and was mixed.

The band continued writing for their follow-up in September 2007. In one month, the band had completed writing "six or seven songs" that contained a much more positive outlook to them, according to Ross. In October, the band entered the Studio at the Palms Casino Resort in Las Vegas to begin recording the album. Ross became the primary spokesman for the band, remarking to MTV the band was "working backwards" for the release, stripping down its sound and going for a more classic rock approach. With Pretty. Odd. the band was not concerned with succumbing to the pressures of living up to the success of their debut, instead writing and recording songs that made them happy.

The first song written for the album was actually a hold-over from the scrapped record, "Nine in the Afternoon". "We wanted to have a song people could just get on the first listen. ... It was one of those spur-of-the-moment songs that came together in a couple of hours. It's just a fun song; it's not really meant to be taken seriously," said Ross of the song. The song inspired the band to write happier tracks, and, from there, the band buckled down, ripping through eight new songs in a little more than six weeks, then writing a couple more while ensconced at the Palms. By the end of the year, the group was well on their way to finishing production on the album. The album came together quickly and each song written made the cut, with "Mad as Rabbits" being the final recorded.

In January 2008, the band wrapped up recording at their home studio over one week, and headed to London's Abbey Road Studios to record strings and horns, which the band regarded as "truly a dream come true for us". While there, the band also mixed the album with Peter Cobbin. Mathes was involved in the instrumentation of the album, performing additional guitars, keyboards, acoustic piano, and mandolin. Mathes arranged and conducted the orchestra at Abbey Road for all tracks except "Nine in the Afternoon" where the orchestra was recorded as Legacy Recording. A Wurlitzer can be found on "Mad as Rabbits", played by Rick Ronick.

== Music ==
"When the Day Met the Night"
A sample of "When the Day Met the Night", an acclaimed track from Pretty. Odd.

"Behind the Sea"
A sample of "Behind the Sea". This "dense" track emphasizes bells and marching drums, part of the sparse instrumentation used on Pretty. Odd.

Musically the album has been described as psychedelic pop, psychedelic rock, baroque pop, pop, pop rock, and folk rock. The sound of the album was described by the band as "more organic and mellower" than A Fever You Can't Sweat Out, as well as unintentionally and coincidentally similar to music of the Beatles, in both songwriting and scope. "We all like all of that, from Rubber Soul to The White Album and all of that, but even before, we were into that theatrical element of things. We didn't want to do a Sgt. Pepper's thing," explained Ross. The band never had the intention of music similar to the Beach Boys and the Beatles, according to both Ross and Walker. "It was like before we were writing these songs, we were writing things that were almost entirely orchestrated - and it kind of carried over into this stuff," continued Ross. "And I do think that half this record does sort of have that kind of 'fantastical instrumentation' thing, but we were just trying to fit the mood of each song. And in some cases, we just thought, 'We've got to have this.'" The difference in age did not take negative effect on the band, instead inspiring them to look through a more mature perspective, according to singer Brendon Urie.

Although there was no "clear vision" behind Pretty. Odd., the band knew that they "wanted to write songs differently in the sense that not all the songs sounded the same or were part of one set genre, you know, just doing something different. With this record, we listened to a bunch of different stuff, too, so that kind of helped broaden our musical taste." Thanks to the new collaborative relationship with producer Rob Mathes, the roles within the band became blurred. Although most songs on the record are attributed to Ryan Ross, the entire band collaborated on each track, with Urie writing two tracks himself and Walker and Smith adding additional lyrics to several tracks. The Washington Post reviewed the new sound of Panic positively: "Everything is new, if old, from the baroque instrumentation (the use of a fluegelhorn), songwriting (less wordy, more obtuse) and vocal phrasing (streamlined) to the Beatlesque chord progressions, melodies, hooks and stacked vocal harmonies, which also owe a minor debt to Brian Wilson." The lyrics mingle ruined romances and neo-psychedelic aphorisms.

"Nine in the Afternoon" received positive reviews and critics noted the change in direction from the band's debut and Pretty. Odd. James Montgomery of MTV regarded the song similar to The Band's Music from Big Pink, and called final single "Northern Downpour" reminiscent of "an Abbey Road outtake". "When the Day Met the Night", the record's eighth track, was heavily praised by music publications. Spin regarded it as the centerpiece of the record, calling it "a sunshine pop sing-along that's as blindingly bright" and a stark contrast to the "embarrassing" A Fever You Can't Sweat Out. Gigwise called the song "the track everyone will want to see the band play live," and noting that its "brass backing and glorious string-based crescendo are that of Pet Sounds-era Beach Boys." National Public Radio commented that Pretty. Odd. "experimented with psychedelic pop, vaudeville and unusual instrumentation."

== Promotion ==
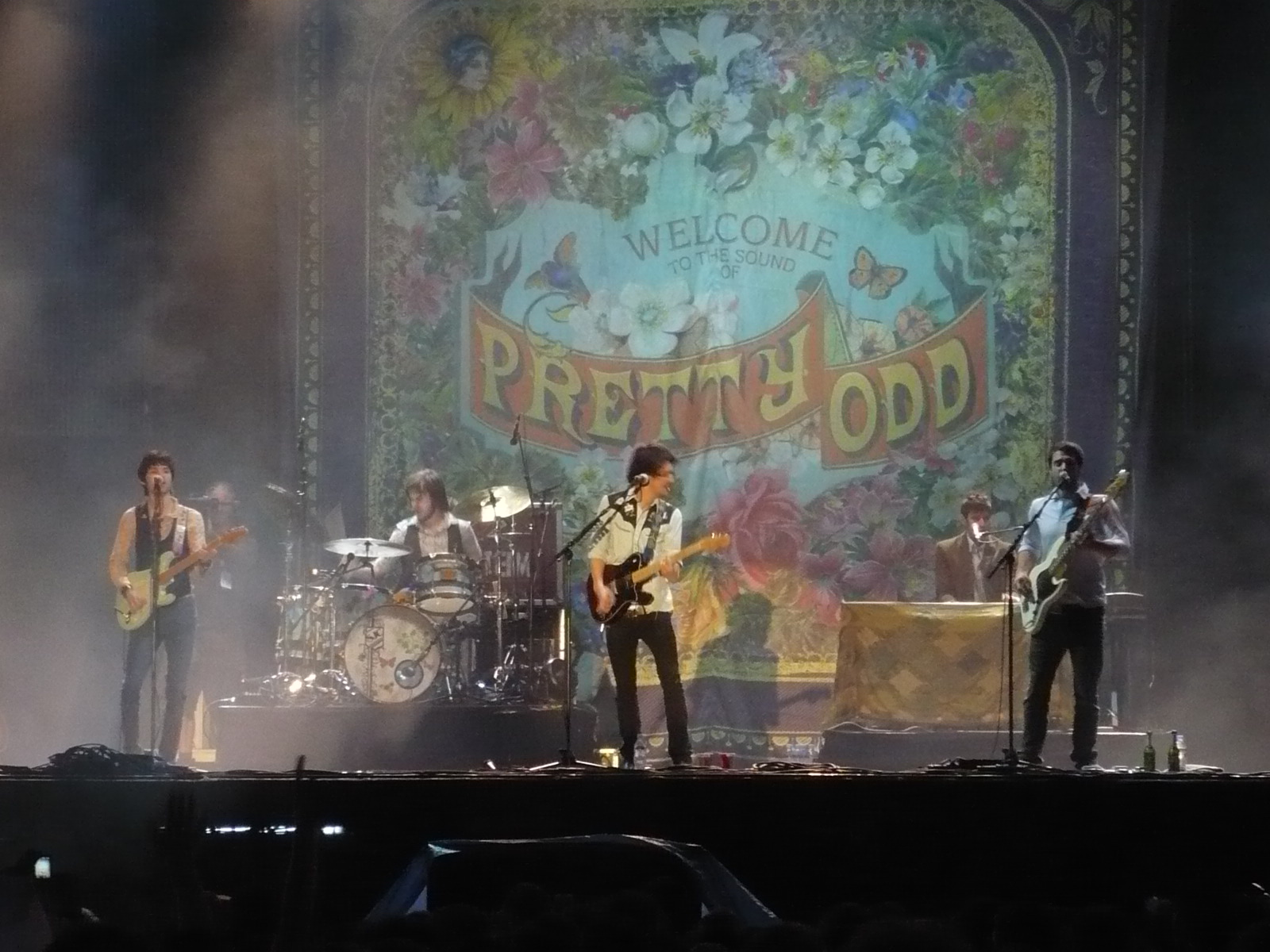
Panic at the Disco, performing live at the Hurricane festival in Germany, June 2008.

The entire marketing campaign for Pretty. Odd. was based solely on grassroots and viral marketing. The band's original intention with the record, according to drummer Spencer Smith, was to have a single out by Christmas 2007 and the album out by February. The band first began promotion for the album in November 2007, with a snippet of "Nine in the Afternoon" audible in the Heroes episode "Cautionary Tales". On December 12, 2007, the group released a cryptic MySpace bulletin containing a link to their website and a message mysteriously stating "And so it begins …" The link led to the band's official website, where a puzzle revealed what most seemed to agree read "You Don't Have to Worry." Inspired by an idea when the band got drunk while recording according to manager Bob McLynn, the viral marketing campaign was the first clues to what would reveal several more clues over the following weeks, including the album title, artwork and first single.

"Nine in the Afternoon" was revealed as the first single from Pretty. Odd. through the puzzle aforementioned on December 14, 2007. The original message was revealed to be a disclaimer in the record's first track, "We're So Starving", which debuted in a rough mix on the band's MySpace on January 2, 2008. The demo gained 45,000 listens by the end of the day, before it was removed. The album's title, Pretty. Odd., was hinted at during the music video shoot for "Nine in the Afternoon" on December 22, where each band member wore a sash bearing the title. The title was revealed by a spokesperson for Atlantic Records on January 9, 2008. On the same date, the band unveiled a new logo and dropped the exclamation point from their name, effectively becoming Panic at the Disco, which soon caused outrage among the band's fanbase. In April 2008, the band released a short film to promote the album, titled Panic at the Disco in: American Valley.

== Artwork and title ==
"It seems like [Panic have] put some thought into the changes ... they're not just changes for changes' sake. Pretty. Odd. works because it conjures up images of something that is both pretty and odd, which is interesting, And it's grammatically interesting, because without the period, the word 'pretty' would be modifying the word 'odd.' So it takes on a completely different context."

— Geraldine Woods

The album's title, Pretty. Odd., was conceived randomly while recording and the name stuck. "It just happened one night. We were working on a new song, and we weren't even talking about album titles, but it was just something I wrote down, and I brought it up to the guys," Ross explained. "Like, Pretty. Odd. And then they all liked it, and that was a couple of months ago, so we just kept it since then." Smith added that the band thought it was "more fun" with the punctuation present in the title. Meanwhile, the lack of punctuation in the band's name outraged fans and brought about a strange amount of press. Geraldine Woods compared the punctuation to e.e. cummings and likened it to a form of "rebellion for creative people."

The entirety of the art direction for Pretty. Odd. was headed by Alex Kirzhner, with inspiration from Panic at the Disco. The inside liner notes, which include the lyrics to each song, were illustrated by graphic designer Connie Makita, and the majority of the rest of the illustrations were designed by Kirzhner with designer Tanapan "Bang" Puangpakdee. The album art was revealed via the band's official website on January 23, 2008. The album cover art consists of painted flowers and butterflies, which Slant regarded as a tribute to the Beach Boys. The deluxe edition vinyl package was nominated for Best Boxed Or Special Limited Edition Package at the 2009 Grammy Awards, but lost to Radiohead's In Rainbows (2007).

== Release and commercial performance ==
Pretty. Odd. was released on March 25, 2008, in the United States and Canada, as well as various other dates for other countries. The album debuted at number two on the US Billboard 200 chart, with first-day sales of 54,000, and first-week sales of 139,000 copies in the United States. Those figures marked the band's biggest sales week to that date, beating a previous record held by A Fever You Can't Sweat Out (which sold 45,000 during the winter of 2006). The record also debuted at "Current Alternative Albums" chart and number two on the "Digital Albums" chart, the latter of which accounted for 26 percent of the disc's overall sales. Online sales were very important to the early success of Pretty. Odd.; when the iTunes Store allowed customers to pre-order the album two months ahead of its release, it had already sold 8,000 copies the day before it was released. By May, the album had sold 235,280 copies according to Nielsen SoundScan. By June, it had sold over 500,000 copies through online music services. The number one position on the Billboard 200 chart was the self-titled debut from Day26, enjoying its second week at the top of the chart.

The album also debuted at number two on the UK Albums Chart, and eventually went gold in the UK. However, weekly sales for the album sharply declined and the album dropped from number two to eleven within the next week, and it spent only six weeks within the top 100. Pretty. Odd. debuted at number two on both the Canada's Albums Chart and the Mexican Albums Chart. The album peaked within the top 10 of the charts of New Zealand, Austria, and Ireland. The album debuted at number one in Australia. The album was less commercially successful in countries such as Sweden and France, where the album barely cracked the top 40.

Although the album has been commercially viable and was eventually certified platinum in the United States, the record failed to match the sales of the band's debut, A Fever You Can't Sweat Out. Pretty. Odd. received relatively poor sales in competition with its predecessor, which was certified platinum in a matter of months, while Pretty. Odd. was certified platinum eleven years after its release. "It's really hard to judge how the album is doing based on record sales, you know?" Ross told MTV News. "We look at that, and we don't really know what that even means. All we can go off is being on [the Honda Civic Tour] and seeing that people are getting into the new stuff, and that's the only way we can tell firsthand if things are going well or not." "It's a really weird time for music, and it's hard to tell where you stand, and all the things that used to tell you about your band have kind of gone away. So how you perceive yourself has changed," Smith added. "Luckily for us, rock bands have always been about playing live, [which is] good for us, because we're a real band who plays our own instruments, so we love being able to do it. And luckily that's always going to be there, because you can't download the concert ticket." As of June 2008, the album has sold 600,000 copies worldwide.

== Reception ==
Professional ratings
Aggregate scores
Source	Rating
Metacritic	70/100
Review scores
Source	Rating
AllMusic	4/5 stars
The A.V. Club	B−
Entertainment Weekly	B+
Mojo	2/5 stars
NME	7/10
Q	3/5 stars
Rolling Stone	3.5/5 stars
Spin	4/5 stars
Uncut	4/5 stars
USA Today	3/4 stars

Pretty. Odd. created fan confusion and received a mostly mixed critical response, so much so that in 2011 Rolling Stone called the record one of the boldest moves in rock history. At Metacritic, it currently holds a score of 70 out of 100 based on 22 reviews from mainstream critics, indicating "generally favourable reviews". Of the original reviews, Spin generally was the most enthusiastic: "Pretty. Odd. lives up to its title because it dares to be optimistically beautiful at a time when sadness and ugliness might have won them easier credibility." Billboard also was generally positive, calling the record "15 tracks of welcomed live drum sounds, symphonies and stacked harmonies." Time called the record's songs smarter and said it provided a more exciting outcome for the band's future: "Where this band goes now is unclear, but the journey is a lot more interesting." British publication NME viewed the album in a positive light, calling it a "victory for artistic ambition over cynical careerism" and "one of the feel-good psych-pop albums of the year."

Alternative Press called Pretty. Odd. ambitious, while Blender called several songs on the record a "brush with greatness." Rob Sheffield of Rolling Stone agreed with the latter statement, calling the songs "often beautiful," rounding out a less-than-impressed review with "Even when it's over the top, which is basically always, Pretty. Odd. sounds cheerful." Entertainment Weekly's Leah Greenblatt called it "more pretty than odd," calling it a "headphones album, a dense, largely enjoyable layer cake of ideas and instrumentation that might actually alienate its teenage fans." The A.V. Club's Aaron Burgess stated that Pretty. Odd. deserves "far more than a casual listen," praising the baroque orchestration and multilayered harmonies. Stephen Thomas Erlewine of AllMusic called the album "a deliriously jumbled, left field delight." Paul Schrodt of the online Slant Magazine dismissed the record as generic, but commended the "exuberant delivery" of the pop hooks.

Mojo called the LP "too clinical and calculated" considering the young age of band members. Fellow British music magazine Q expressed similar sentiments: "Ultimately, you're left wishing that Panic at the Disco had more to say about their own generation, instead of mimicking that of their parents'." The Boston Globe reviewer Matthew Shaer agreed: "Pretty borrows liberally from the things that made those bands superficially interesting - the practiced eccentricity, the constant innovation - without paying tribute to the cultural and political sensibilities that made them great." The New York Times called the record "wildly elaborate" and a "brave change," but offered less kind words to summarize: "For all its craftsmanship, Pretty. Odd. comes across as mannered and overbearing, more studied than exuberant." The Village Voice called the record earnest and triumphant, but criticized the "hard to grasp" overarching narrative strand. Uncut held that the album "tried too hard to be obtuse," but praised the band's artistic evolution.

James Montgomery of MTV News has described Pretty. Odd. in retrospect as overlooked, writing that, "Give this one a decade ... we could have another Pinkerton on our hands," referencing the Weezer album that received a mixed response upon release but was heralded as a classic in later years.

== Touring ==
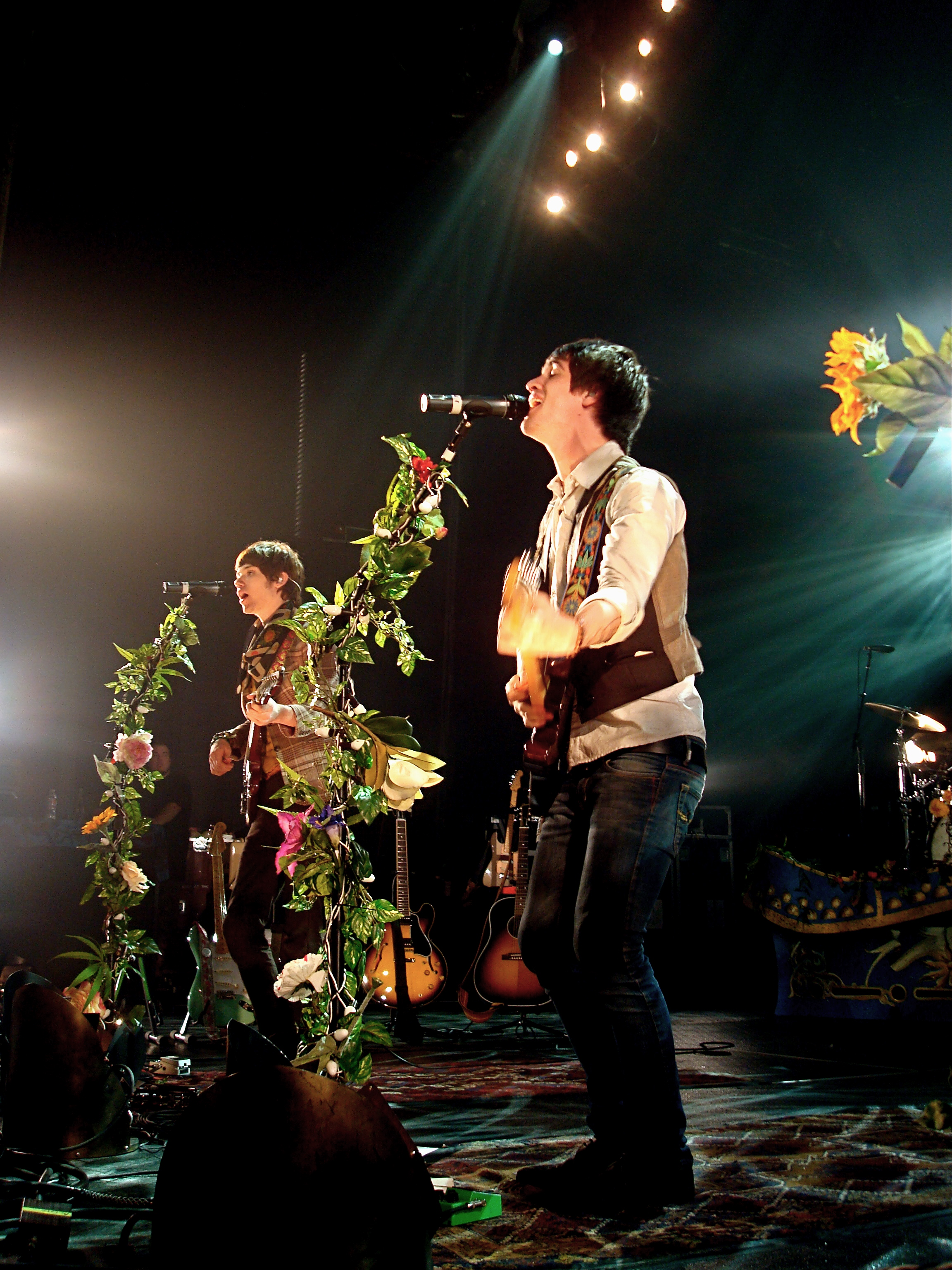
Urie and Ross performing in support of Pretty. Odd., April 2008.

The band announced plans to headline the 2008 Honda Civic Tour in January 2008, which took up the majority of early touring for the album. Motion City Soundtrack, The Hush Sound and Phantom Planet opened for the tour, which ran April 10 to July 14, 2008, across North America. Throughout October and November 2008, the band toured with Dashboard Confessional and The Cab on the Rock Band Live Tour promoting the video game Rock Band 2.

As expected and predicted by several music publications, Panic at the Disco adopted a very different style for the touring in support of Pretty. Odd., in contrast to the dark, circus-themed elements of their previous stage shows. Each show contained "woodsy set pieces, projections of flora and fauna, and mic stands wrapped in lights and flowers," and each band member dressed in a vest. While reflecting on the theatrical nature of A Fever You Can't Sweat Out touring, Urie commented "We did it and it was a lot of fun when we did it, but this time around I think we wanted to get back to a more intimate, personal setting, and scale it down a little bit." Ryan Ross explained that "It's more about connecting with the audience and seeing what's gonna happen every night. It's not as scripted out and pre-planned. It makes it more exciting for us, and less monotonous every night." A live album, ...Live in Chicago, based on live recordings from Chicago during the Honda Civic Tour, was released December 2, 2008. An accompanying DVD contains photos from the tour, each music video from the album as well as behind-the-scenes footage of the videos and the tour, the short film Panic at the Disco In: American Valley, and the documentary feature based on the tour, All In A Day's.

Pretty. Odd.'s touring was also defined by a larger effort to remain environmentally conscious. On the tour, the band worked with two non-profit eco organizations: Reverb, which facilitates environmentally friendly touring; and Global Inheritance, which seeks to inspire more eco-activism. In a 2008 interview, Ross revealed that the band was traveling on a biodiesel bus, re-using plastics, and recycling more backstage. The band also printed tour booklets on recycled paper, with soy ink, and organized an "eco-contest," in which profits from the tour went straight to environmental organizations.

== Track listing ==
All lyrics are written by Ryan Ross, except where noted. Additional lyrics by Jon Walker and Spencer Smith; all music is composed by Panic at the Disco (Ross, Brendon Urie, Walker, Smith).

No.	Title	Lyrics	Length
1.	"We're So Starving"		1:21
2.	"Nine in the Afternoon"		3:11
3.	"She's a Handsome Woman"		3:12
4.	"Do You Know What I'm Seeing?"		4:14
5.	"That Green Gentleman (Things Have Changed)"		3:15
6.	"I Have Friends in Holy Spaces"	Urie	1:56
7.	"Northern Downpour"		4:07
8.	"When the Day Met the Night"		4:53
9.	"Pas de Cheval"		2:39
10.	"The Piano Knows Something I Don't Know"		3:43
11.	"Behind the Sea"		3:33
12.	"Folkin' Around"	Urie	1:55
13.	"She Had the World"		3:47
14.	"From a Mountain in the Middle of the Cabins"		3:02
15.	"Mad as Rabbits"		3:48
Total length:			48:46

Japanese bonus tracks
No.	Title	Length
16.	"Do You Know What I'm Seeing?" (alternate version)	3:55
17.	"Nine in the Afternoon" (music video)	3:17
Total length:		55:58

iTunes deluxe version bonus tracks
No.	Title	Length
16.	"Nine in the Afternoon" (radio mix)	3:12
17.	"Nine in the Afternoon" (music video)	3:17
18.	"Behind the Sea" (alternate version)	2:23
19.	"Mad as Rabbits" (music video)	3:48
Total length:		61:27

== Personnel ==
All credits for Pretty. Odd. are adapted from the album's liner notes, and Tidal.

Panic at the Disco

- Brendon Urie – vocals, guitars, piano, keyboards, organ, bass, harpsichord, ukulele
- Ryan Ross – guitars, vocals, harmonica, keyboards, piano, creative direction
- Jon Walker – bass, guitars, backing vocals
- Spencer Smith – drums, percussion, backing vocals

Additional musicians

- Rob Mathes – additional guitars, keyboards, mandolin, piano, orchestral arrangements
- Rick Ronick – Wurlitzer on "Mad As Rabbits"
- Perry Montague-Mason – 1st violin
- Warren Zielinski – 2nd violin
- Peter Lale – viola
- Tony Pleeth – cello
- Chris Laurence – double bass
- David Andrew Mann – alto saxophone, clarinet
- Andy Snitzer – tenor saxophone
- Roger Rosenberg – baritone saxophone
- Michael Davis – trombone
- Jeff Kievit – trumpet, flugelhorn; piccolo trumpet on "Nine in the Afternoon"
- Tony Kadleck – trumpet on "Nine in the Afternoon"
- Sandra Park – concertmaster on "Nine in the Afternoon"

Production

- Rob Mathes – producer
- Claudius Mittendorfer – engineer, recording (Studio at the Palms)
- Jonathan Allen – orchestra engineer (Abbey Road)
- Alex Venguer – orchestra engineer on "Nine in the Afternoon" (Legacy Recording)
- Mark Gray – assistant engineer (Studio at the Palms)
- Lewis Jones – assistant engineer (Abbey Road)
- Peter Cobbin – mixing
- Richard Lancaster – mix assistant
- Peter Hutchings – second mix assistant
- Scott Hull – mastering
- Panic at the Disco – creative direction, art direction
- Alex Kirzhner – art direction, creative director, illustrations
- Connie Makita – illustrations
- Jennifer Tzar – photography
- Tanapan "Bang" Puangpakdee – illustrations

== Charts ==
=== Weekly charts ===
Chart (2008)	Peak position
Australian Albums (ARIA)	1
Austrian Albums (Ö3 Austria)	5
Belgian Albums (Ultratop Flanders)	34
Belgian Albums (Ultratop Wallonia)	99
Canadian Albums (Billboard)	2
Danish Albums (Hitlisten)	38
Dutch Albums (Album Top 100)	41
Finnish Albums (Suomen virallinen lista)	17
French Albums (SNEP)	58
German Albums (Offizielle Top 100)	13
Irish Albums (IRMA)	7
New Zealand Albums (RMNZ)	5
Scottish Albums (OCC)	2
Swedish Albums (Sverigetopplistan)	35
Swiss Albums (Schweizer Hitparade)	71
UK Albums (Official Charts)	2
US Billboard 200	2
US Top Rock Albums (Billboard)	1

=== Year-end charts ===
Chart (2008)	Position
US Billboard 200	122
US Top Rock Albums (Billboard)	25

== Certifications ==
Region	Certification	Certified units/sales
Canada (Music Canada)	Gold	50,000^{‡}
United Kingdom (BPI)	Gold	100,000^{^}
United States (RIAA)	Platinum	1,000,000^{‡}
^{^} Shipments figures based on certification alone.^{‡} Sales+streaming figures based on certification alone.
