= Brendon Urie =

American musician and songwriter (born 1987)

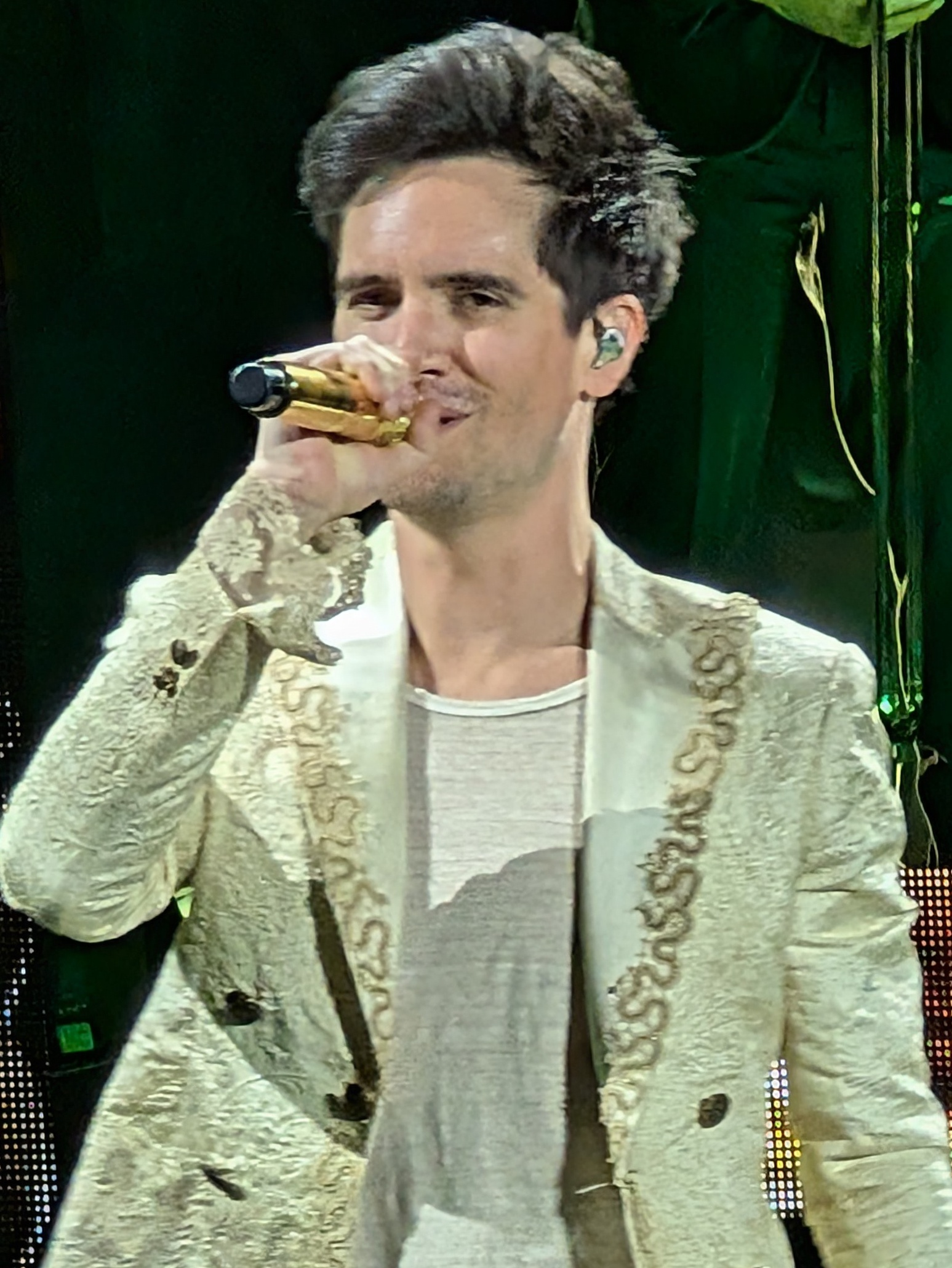
- Urie at When We Were Young 2025

Background information
- Born: Brendon Boyd Urie; April 12, 1987 (age 39); St. George, Utah, U.S.
- Origin: Las Vegas, Nevada, U.S.
- Genres: Pop rock; pop-punk; alternative rock; baroque pop; pop; emo; electropop
- Occupations: Singer; songwriter; musician
- Instruments: Vocals; guitar; piano; keyboards; bass; drums; percussion
- Years active: 2004–present
- Labels: DCD2; Fueled by Ramen
- Formerly of: Panic! at the Disco
- Spouse: Sarah Orzechowski (m. 2013)
- Children: 1
- Website: panicatthedisco.com

Signature
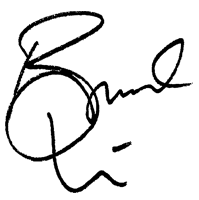

Brendon Boyd Urie (born April 12, 1987) is an American singer, songwriter, and musician who is best known as the lead vocalist and frontman of Panic! at the Disco, the only constant member throughout the band's 19-year run.

Many of his songs have achieved commercial success, reaching high spots on Billboard charts and millions of sales. On January 24, 2023, Urie announced that he would disband Panic! at the Disco in order to raise his then-forthcoming child with his wife. He currently plays drums in a band led by former Panic! At the Disco touring guitarist, Mike Viola.

== Early life ==
Urie was born in St. George, Utah, and his family moved to Las Vegas, Nevada, when he was two years old. He is the fifth and youngest child born to Boyd and Grace Urie. He is of about one quarter Polynesian descent from Hawaii, through his mother's side. He was raised in an LDS family but renounced his faith around 17 due to displeasure with the church and not believing in its ideology.

Urie attended Palo Verde High School in Las Vegas; he described himself as a "spaz in high school," and explained that one student would always bully him. He worked at Tropical Smoothie Cafe to pay his band's rent for their practice space. At the café, Urie often sang for customers. Urie graduated high school in 2005.

"I would sing anything I was listening to at the time, but I was down to take requests. I remember singing some Scorpions songs. Some W.A.S.P. 80s anthems are usually good for tips. It was a huge range of stuff. Some people liked it, and some people didn't. I had to respect other people's wishes, but I had a couple people come in who would ask me to sing for a tip. That's always fun."
– Brendon Urie recalls his experience working at Tropical Smoothie Cafe (March 22, 2011)

== Career ==
=== Panic! at the Disco ===
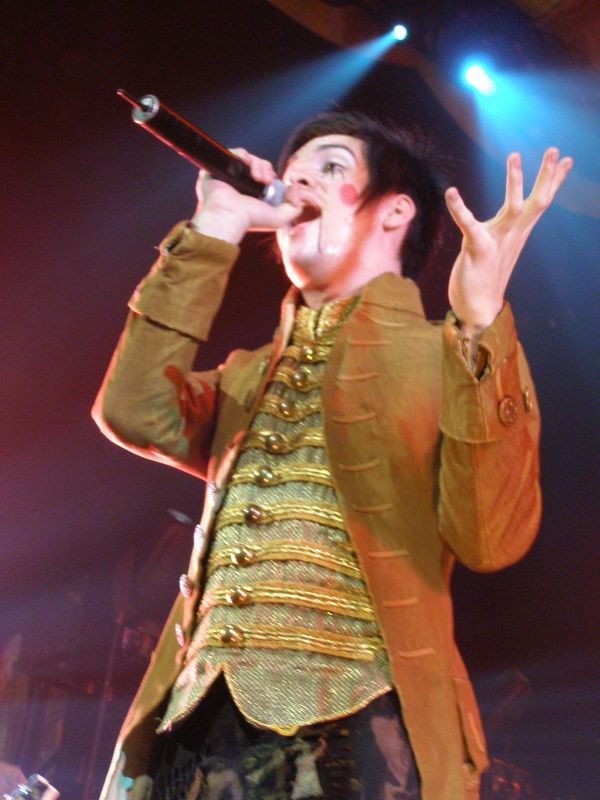
Urie in 2006

In 2004, Urie was recruited into Panic! at the Disco by Palo Verde High School classmate and friend Brent Wilson as a guitarist/vocalist. Originally, the band's founder Ryan Ross was their lead singer. When Urie filled in for Ross during a band rehearsal, they were impressed with Urie's vocal abilities and he was chosen as their lead singer. He officially joined the band in 2004.

From then on, Panic! at the Disco released seven studio albums with Urie as lead vocalist. A Fever You Can't Sweat Out was released in 2005 with the hit lead single "I Write Sins Not Tragedies" propelling it to 1.8 million sales. For their second album, Pretty. Odd. (2008), Urie also took lyrical responsibility and wrote two of the tracks on the record by himself: "I Have Friends in Holy Spaces" and "Folkin' Around". He also wrote "New Perspective" for the soundtrack to the motion picture Jennifer's Body.

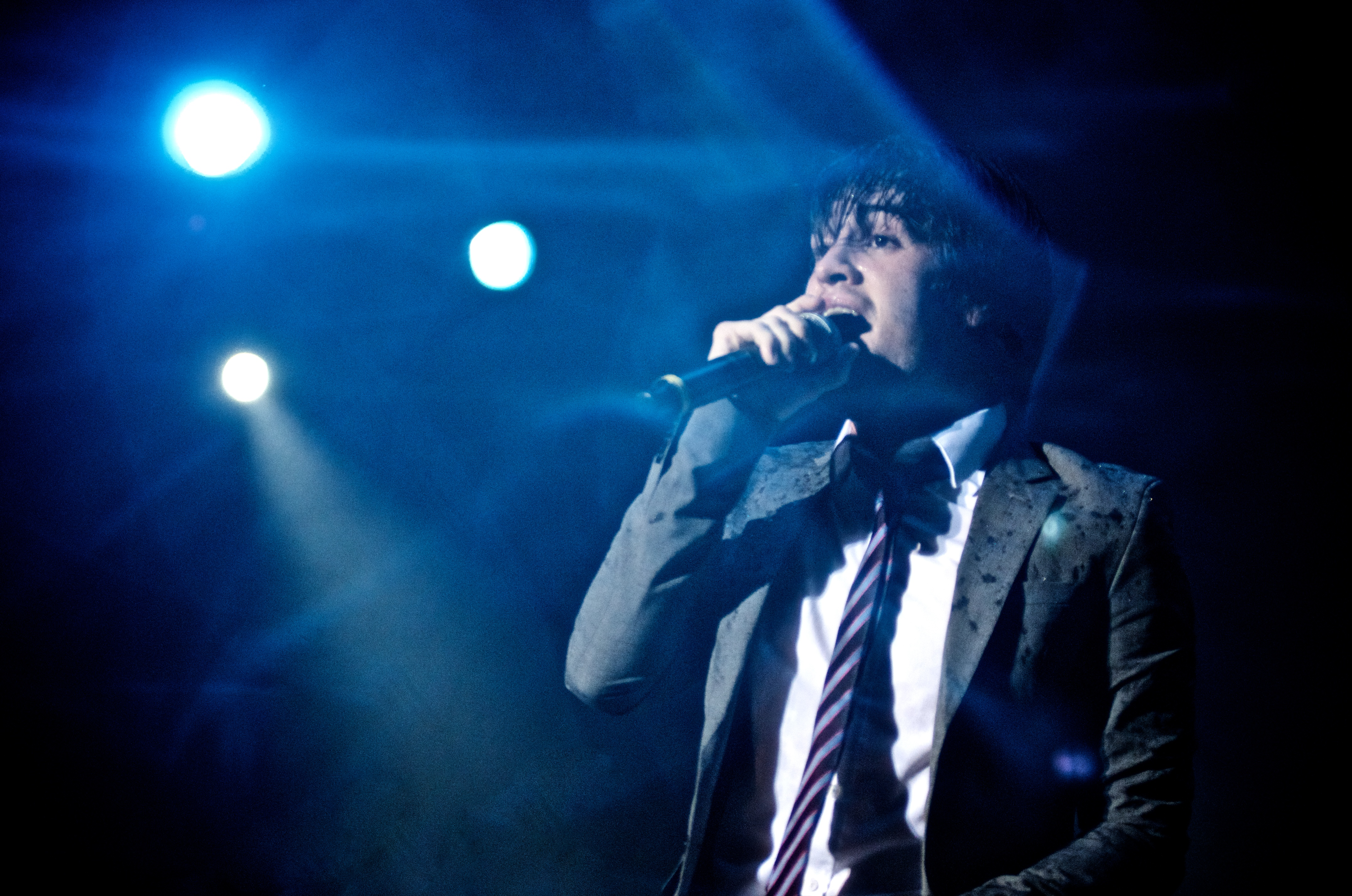
Urie performing with Panic! at the Disco in 2009

On March 22, 2011, the band released their third album Vices & Virtues following the departure of Ross and Walker. On October 8, 2013, the fourth album, Too Weird to Live, Too Rare to Die! was released. It debuted at No. 2 on the Billboard 200. On July 21, 2014, Urie won "Best Vocalist" at the Alternative Press Music Awards. In 2015, founding drummer Spencer Smith left the band and bassist Dallon Weekes departed from the official lineup, being downgraded to a touring member, leaving Urie as the only member of the official lineup.

On January 15, 2016, Panic! at the Disco released their fifth studio album, Death of a Bachelor, eventually earning the band its best sales week and first number one album. On March 21, 2018, the band released two new songs "Say Amen (Saturday Night)" and "(Fuck A) Silver Lining". At the same time, the band also announced a tour, and a new album called Pray for the Wicked. On June 6, 2022, Panic! at the Disco announced their seventh studio album Viva Las Vengeance and released the title single along with announcing a tour.

On January 24, 2023, Urie announced that he would be discontinuing Panic! at the Disco to focus on his family following the conclusion of the Viva Las Vengeance Tour.

=== Other musical projects ===
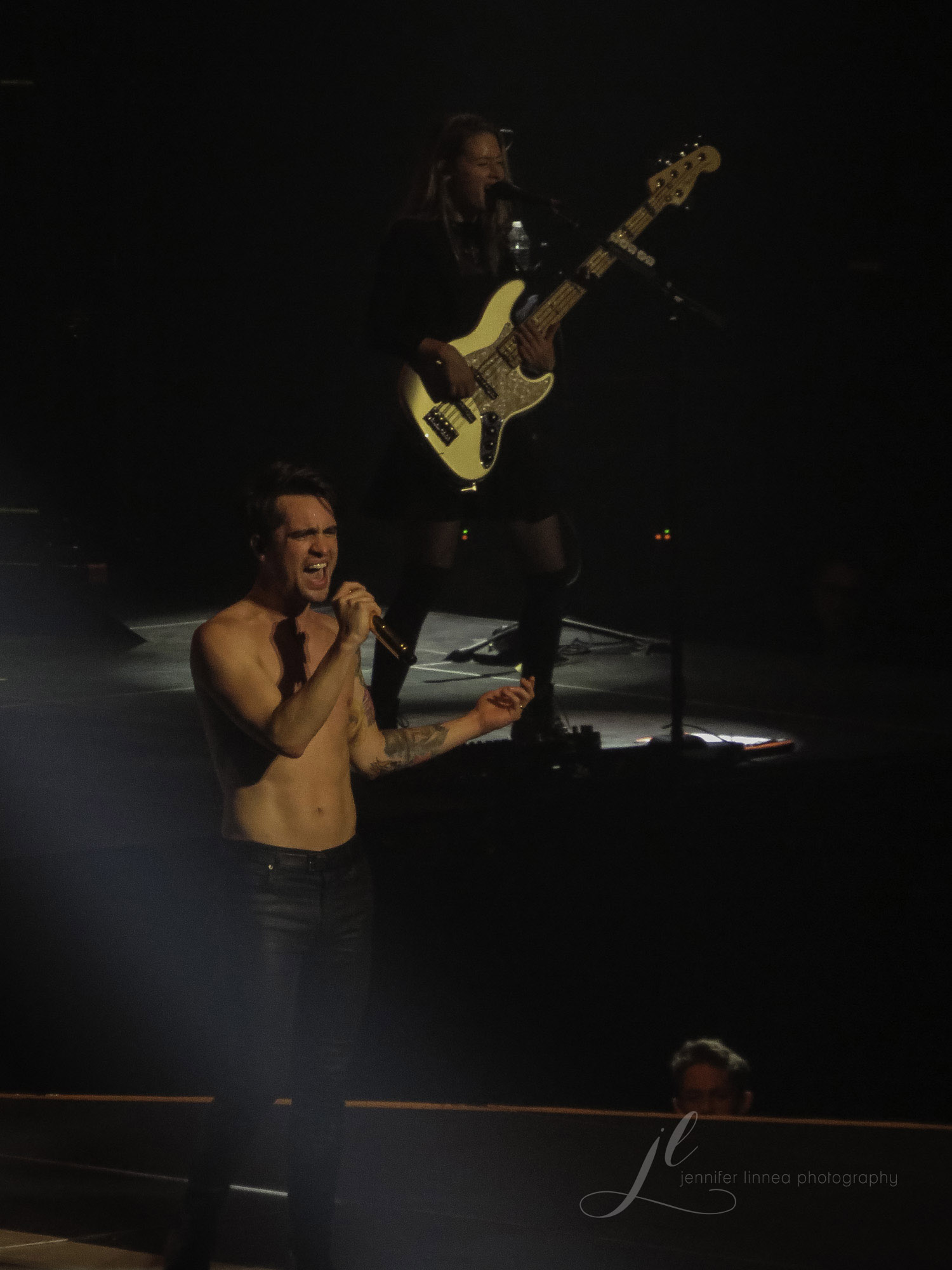
Urie performing with Panic! at the Disco in during the Pray for the Wicked Tour

Urie provided guest vocals alongside Patrick Stump on The Cab's song "One Of THOSE Nights" from their debut album, Whisper War.

Urie has also been involved with several songs and other projects by former labelmates Fall Out Boy. He provided vocals on the songs "What a Catch, Donnie" and "20 Dollar Nose Bleed" from Fall Out Boy's 2008 album, Folie à Deux. Urie also sang back vocals on the track "7 Minutes In Heaven" off of Fall Out Boy's From Under The Cork Tree.

In 2008, Urie became involved with a song for the Coca-Cola Company, called "Open Happiness". Urie sings the chorus of the song, which also features labelmate Patrick Stump of Fall Out Boy, labelmate Travis McCoy of Gym Class Heroes, Cee-Lo Green, and Janelle Monáe. The song was written and produced by Butch Walker, co-written by Cee-Lo Green and remixed by Polow Da Don. Urie was also featured as an elated news reporter in the music video for the song, which was released on July 16, 2009.

Urie appeared in the music videos "A Little Less Sixteen Candles, a Little More Touch Me," "What A Catch, Donnie" and "Headfirst Slide into Cooperstown on a Bad Bet" by Fall Out Boy. Urie appears in the Gym Class Heroes video for the song "Clothes Off!!" alongside former Panic! at the Disco band members Ryan Ross, Spencer Smith and Jon Walker. The members are seen dancing in animal costumes, Urie being in a dog suit. Urie also appears in "One of THOSE Nights" by The Cab, which also features Ryan Ross, Jon Walker, Pete Wentz, Patrick Stump and Spencer Smith. In 2010 Urie and bandmate Spencer Smith appeared in Butch Walker's music video "Pretty Melody", appearing as ninjas. Urie and Smith also appeared in Butch Walker's Panic! at Butch Walker's, a parody in which Urie discovers Walker is a psychotic homicidal cannibal.

In 2011, Urie co-wrote a song with Rivers Cuomo of the band Weezer. Rivers has said that "If Panic! wants it, they have first dibs, but if not, it could work for Weezer."

In December 2013, Urie sang "Big Shot" in front of Billy Joel, President Obama, and an audience, when Billy Joel received the Kennedy Center Honors.

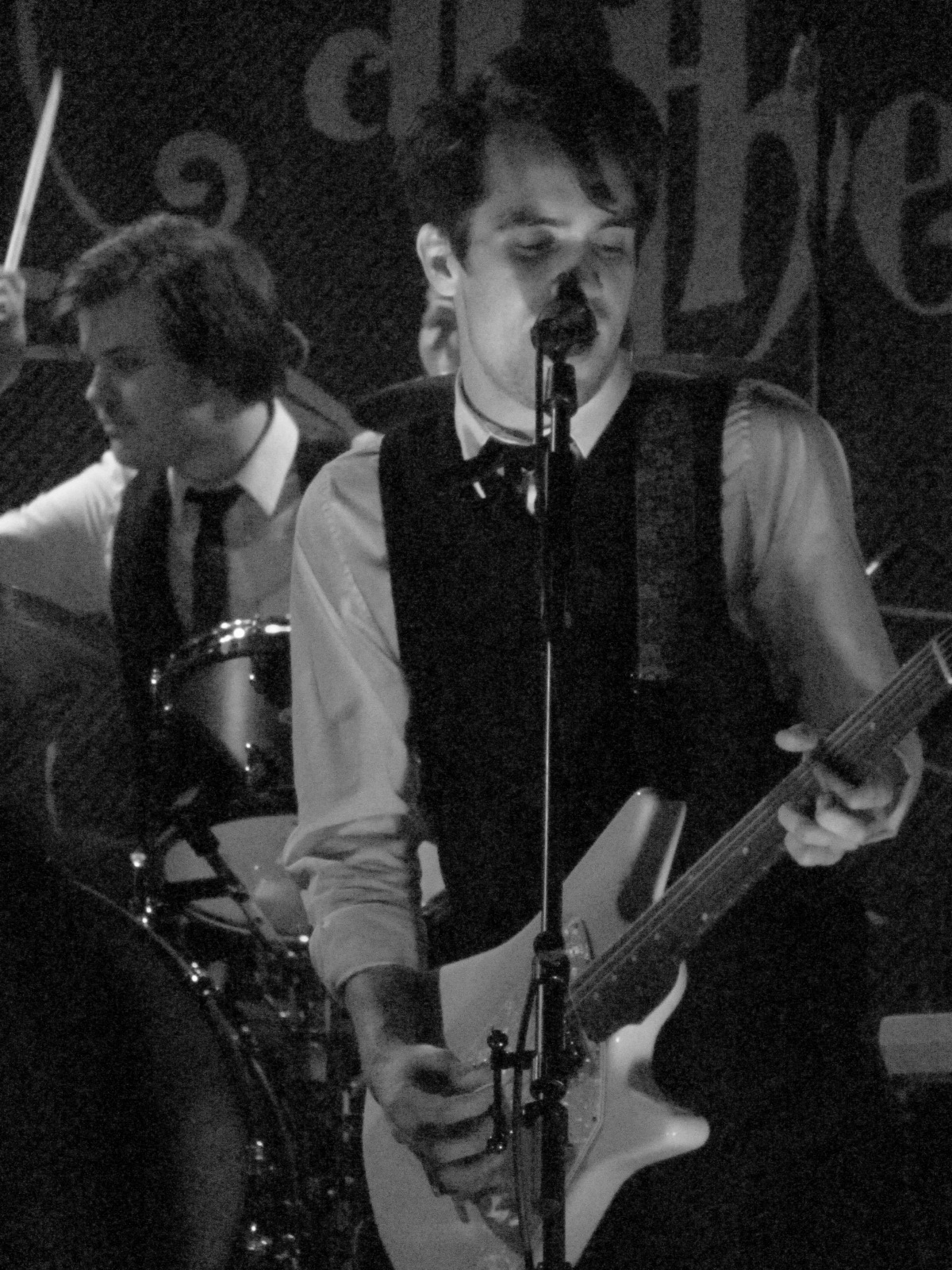
Urie performing with Panic! at the Disco in 2011 at the Bowery Ballroom in New York City

On March 24, 2014, Brendon Urie was featured on Travie McCoy's single "Keep On Keeping On" off his upcoming album Rough Waters. Urie featured on the entirety of the song "Love in the Middle of a Firefight" for Dillon Francis's album Money Sucks, Friends Rule. Francis called it his favorite track on the album. Urie also was featured on the Lil Dicky track "Molly" on his debut studio album Professional Rapper.

In 2016, Urie was featured on the song "It Remembers" by the band Every Time I Die, from their album Low Teens.

On April 11, 2017, Urie announced that he would star in Cyndi Lauper's Tony Award-winning Broadway musical, Kinky Boots, in which he played one of the lead roles, Charlie Price. He played the role from May 26, 2017, to August 6, 2017.

In 2015, Urie wrote the song "Not A Simple Sponge" for the SpongeBob SquarePants musical. The musical made its debut in Chicago in the summer of 2016 and returned to the Palace Theater on Broadway in the winter of 2017. Nickelodeon released a video in the spring of 2016 that includes details about the artists that they worked with to bring the score to life. For his contributions, Urie was nominated for the Tony Award for Best Original Score.

On April 26, 2019, Urie collaborated with singer Taylor Swift and Joel Little on "Me!" which is the lead single of her seventh studio album, Lover. The song obtained commercial success, reaching No. 2 on the Billboard Hot 100, and it also charted in many other countries including the United Kingdom, Canada, Australia and New Zealand.

In 2022, Urie joined the band of friend and Viva Las Vengeance collaborator Mike Viola alongside Jake Sinclair, making the act a three-piece. Viola and Urie wrote the song "Diamonds of New York" about Adam Schlesinger, performing it on April 19, 2022. Over the summer, the band recorded together, in February 2023, the band performed in Hamburg, Germany, and on April 23, 2023, their album Paul McCarthy was released. Urie performed drums and percussion on every track of the project and is pictured in the album's cover artwork. Urie served as inspiration for the song "I Think I Thought Forever Proof." Urie appears in the music videos for Viola's songs "Scientist Alexis" and "Water Makes Me Sick", playing the drums. In 2022, he also worked with Japanese rock band One Ok Rock on the song "Neon". Over the winter of 2023, Urie worked with Viola and Sinclair again on Viola's album, Rock of Boston, which was released on September 20, 2024. Their song "Diamonds of New York" appeared on the album.

== Influences ==
Urie has cited artists and bands such as Frank Sinatra, Queen, David Bowie, Tom DeLonge, Weezer, Green Day, and My Chemical Romance as his biggest influences.

He also praised Taylor Swift as a songwriter.

== Personal life ==
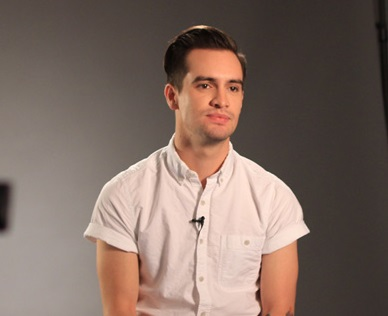
Urie in 2013

Urie was diagnosed with ADHD at a young age and has since been prescribed medication for the condition. He says that he likes to be open about his mental health to his fans. In a 2016 interview with Rolling Stone, Urie stated that he has synesthesia. He has a wide assortment of tattoos; two of them depicted singers Freddie Mercury and Frank Sinatra.

In 2009, Urie met esthetician and actress Sarah Orzechowski at one of his concerts in Detroit; she was in a relationship at the time. They were reintroduced eight months later through Hayley Williams from Paramore and they began dating. The song "Sarah Smiles" from Vices & Virtues (2011) was inspired by Orzechowski. The couple announced their engagement in September 2011, and were married on April 27, 2013, in Malibu, California. They moved from Los Angeles to an undisclosed location in February 2017, stating that "visits and constant harassment" from Urie's fans at their house led him to feel unsafe. On January 24, 2023, Urie and Orzechowski announced that they were expecting their first child; Urie discontinued Panic! at the Disco to focus on his family. Their child was born thirteen days later.

In 2013, Urie said that he had "experimented" with men but stated, "I guess if I had to classify myself, I'd say I'm straight." In July 2018, Urie described himself as pansexual and stated, "I'm married to a woman and I'm very much in love with her but I'm not opposed to a man because to me, I like a person. If a person is great, then a person is great." Urie has been recognized for his vocal and charitable support of the LGBTQ community.

=== Activism and philanthropy ===
Urie has been recognized for various philanthropic efforts, including his own Highest Hopes Foundation. He has campaigned and donated to several organizations and causes, including Planned Parenthood, the Human Rights Campaign, SisterSong and Everytown for Gun Safety, and several youth group organizations. In 2020, during the aftermath of the murder of George Floyd, Urie directed funds to several anti-racist organizations such as the Black Visions Collective and the Minnesota Freedom Fund.

In June 2018, Urie pledged $1 million in partnership with GLSEN to create gay–straight alliance clubs in high schools across the United States. In November 2019, he raised over $134,000 during a 24-hour charity Twitch stream. In early 2020, Urie funded the construction of a recording studio for the Henderson Boys & Girls Club.

== Discography ==
=== Singles ===
==== As featured artist ====
List of singles as featured artist, with selected chart positions, showing year released and album name
Title	Year	Peak chart positions									Certifications	Album
Title	Year	US	US Dance	AUS	CAN	IRE	NOR	NZ	SWE	UK	Certifications	Album
"What A Catch, Donnie" (Fall Out Boy featuring Brendon Urie, Gabe Saporta, Travis McCoy, Doug Neumann, Alexander DeLeon, William Beckett)	2008	94										
"Love in the Middle of a Firefight" (Dillon Francis featuring Brendon Urie)	2014	—	45	—	—	—	—	—	—	—		Money Sucks, Friends Rule
"Roses" (Benny Blanco and Juice Wrld featuring Brendon Urie)	2018	85	—	—	58	81	38	— (Note: "Roses" did not enter the NZ Top 40 Singles Chart, but peaked at number 10 on the NZ Hot Singles Chart.)	— (Note: "Roses" did not enter the Swedish Singellista Chart, but peaked at number five on the Swedish Heatseeker Chart.)	—	RIAA: 2× Platinum; BPI: Silver; MC: Platinum	Friends Keep Secrets
"Me!" (Taylor Swift featuring Brendon Urie)	2019	2	8	2	2	5	9	3	11	3	RIAA: 2× Platinum; ARIA: 5× Platinum; BPI: Platinum; MC: Platinum	Lover
"—" denotes a release that did not chart or were not released in that territory.

=== Promotional singles ===
Title	Year	Album
"Keep On Keeping On" (Travie McCoy featuring Brendon Urie)	2014	Non-album single

=== Guest appearances ===
List of guest appearances, with other performing artists, showing year released and album name
Title	Year	Other artist(s)	Album
"20 Dollar Nose Bleed"	2008	Fall Out Boy	Folie à Deux
"Molly"	2015	Lil Dicky	Professional Rapper
"It Remembers"	2016	Every Time I Die	Low Teens
"Earth"	2019	Lil Dicky	Non-album single

=== With Mike Viola ===
Album	Year
Paul McCarthy	2023
Rock of Boston	2024
