= Spencer Smith (musician) =

American musician and talent agent

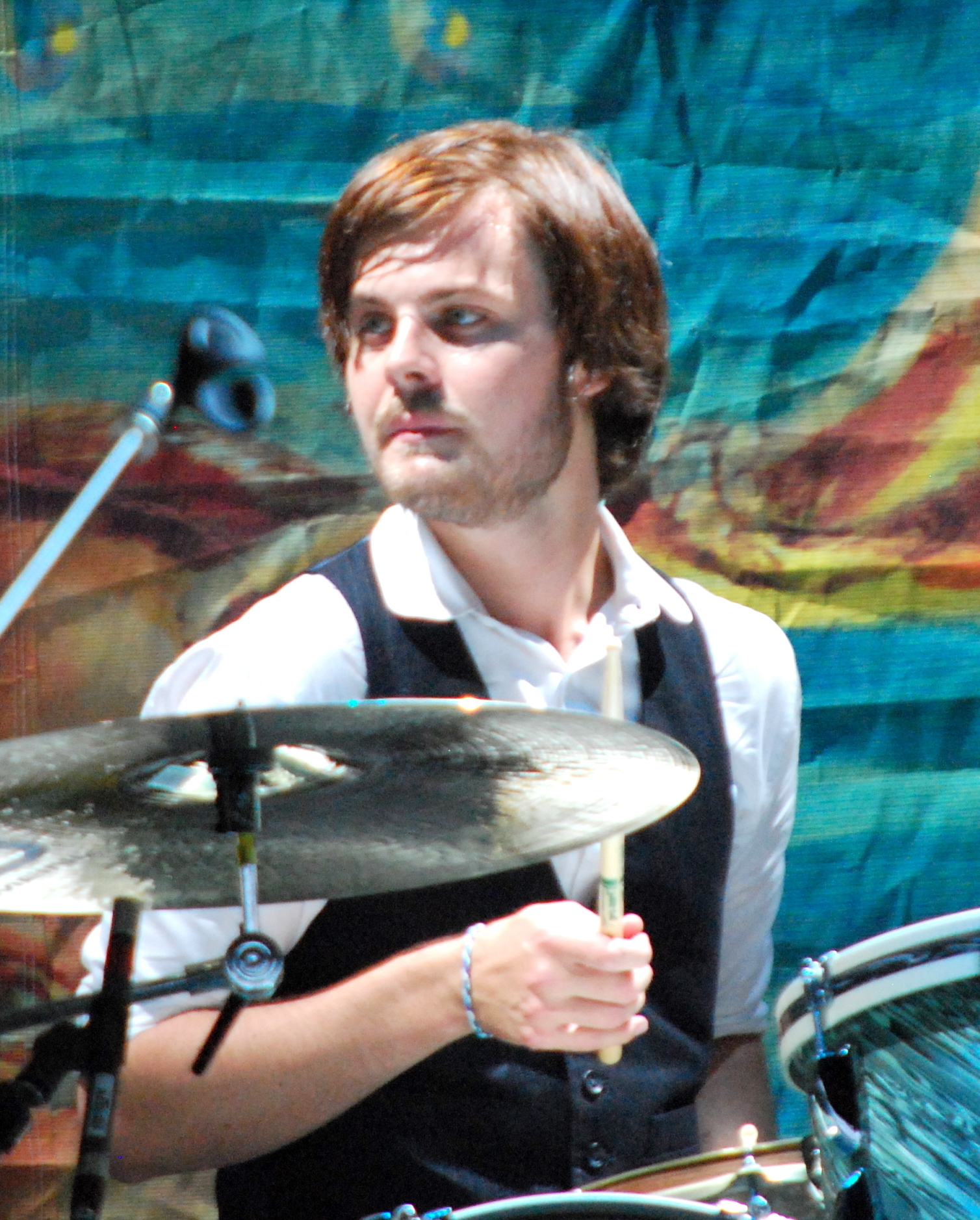
- Smith performing in 2009

Background information
- Born: Spencer James Smith; September 2, 1987 (age 39)
- Origin: Las Vegas, Nevada, U.S.
- Genres: Pop rock; pop; pop punk; baroque pop; emo pop; alternative rock
- Occupations: Musician; songwriter; talent agent
- Instruments: Drums; percussion
- Years active: 2004–2015; 2025 (musician); 2018–present (talent agent)
- Labels: DCD2; Fueled by Ramen
- Formerly of: Panic! at the Disco
- Spouse: Linda Ignarro (m. 2016)

Spencer James Smith (born September 2, 1987) is an American talent agent and former musician and songwriter. He is best known as a co-founding member and the former drummer of the rock band Panic! at the Disco. He recorded four studio albums with the band: A Fever You Can't Sweat Out (2005), Pretty. Odd. (2008), Vices & Virtues (2011), and Too Weird to Live, Too Rare to Die! (2013). The band's debut album went quadruple platinum and charted at No. 13 on the US Billboard 200, spearheaded by the hit single "I Write Sins Not Tragedies", which peaked at No. 7 in the Billboard Hot 100.

After recording four albums with the band, he announced his departure from Panic! on April 2, 2015, via the band's official website, citing a need to settle his drug issues. As of February 7, 2018, Smith works as an official manager and talent finder at DCD2 Records.

== Early life ==
Smith was raised in Las Vegas, Nevada, and attended Bishop Gorman High School, with former bandmate Ryan Ross.

== Panic! at the Disco (2004–2015) ==
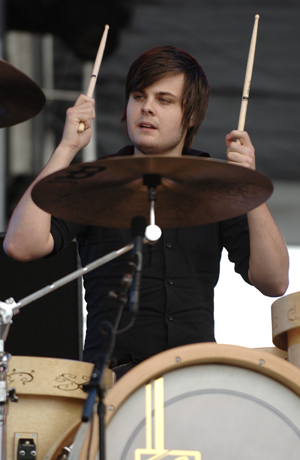
Smith performing with Panic! at the Disco in 2006.

Smith was the drummer for American rock band Panic! at the Disco, formed in 2004. Fall Out Boy bassist Pete Wentz discovered the band through the Internet and quickly signed them to his Decaydance Records label before the band had even played a single show. Smith has played the percussion parts on the band's first four studio albums, A Fever You Can't Sweat Out (2005), Pretty. Odd. (2008), Vices & Virtues (2011) and Too Weird to Live, Too Rare to Die! (2013). A Fever You Can't Sweat Out has sold over four million units worldwide, spurred on by the album's second single "I Write Sins Not Tragedies" which became the band's second most successful song, reaching #7 on the US Billboard Hot 100 chart and becoming the band's mainstream breakthrough so early in their career. The 2008 album Pretty. Odd. debuted at #2 on the Billboard 200, however it was less widely received in comparison to Fever and quickly fell off the charts.

In 2007, members of The Cab sent Smith a demo and he helped sign them to Pete Wentz's record label, Decaydance. Smith appears in the music videos "What a Catch, Donnie" and "Headfirst Slide into Cooperstown on a Bad Bet" by Fall Out Boy, and also appears in the Gym Class Heroes video for the song "Clothes Off!!" alongside bandmate Brendon Urie, and former Panic! at the Disco band members Ryan Ross and Jon Walker. The members are seen dancing in animal costumes, Smith being in a seal suit. In 2010, Smith and bandmate Brendon Urie appeared in Butch Walker's music video "Pretty Melody", appearing as ninjas.

In 2009, founding member and guitarist Ryan Ross and bassist Jon Walker left the band, leaving Smith and vocalist Brendon Urie as the sole remaining members. Smith completed work on Panic! at the Disco's third studio album Vices & Virtues with bandmate Brendon Urie, which was released in March 2011. Prior to the release of Vices & Virtues, Smith co-starred with Brendon Urie in a seven-minute short film, called The Overture, directed by Shane Drake. The short film addressed the departure of two former Panic! at the Disco members, founding member and guitarist Ryan Ross and bassist Jon Walker.

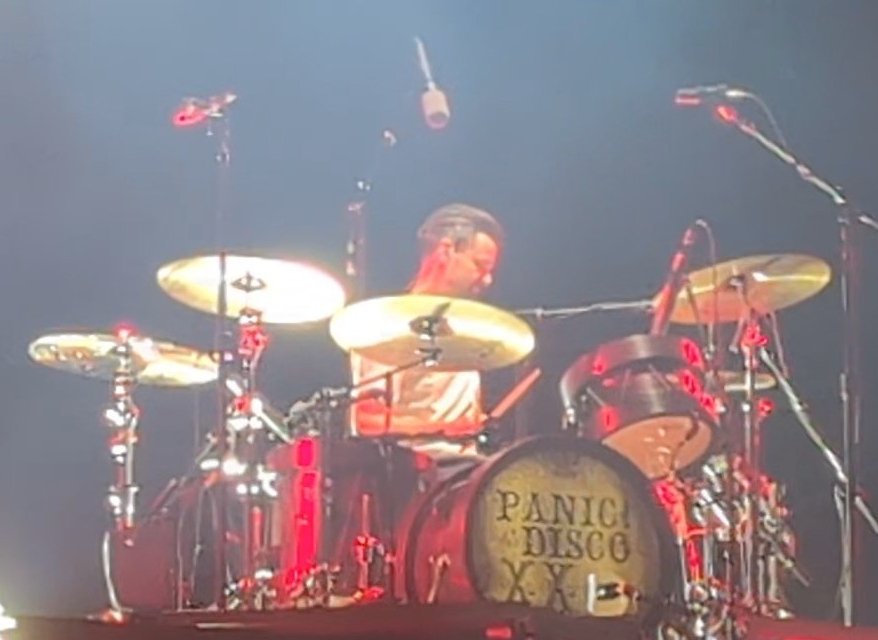
Smith performing at the When We Were Young Festival in 2025.

In an April 2011 interview with Blogcritics, Smith revealed plans to expand Panic! at the Disco from the current duo with the addition of new band members saying, "We knew it would be just me and Brendon, but we have also left the option open to work with other people." Smith also stated that being on tour is his favorite part of the musical process, though that would be impossible without work in the recording studio. On August 2, 2013, he released an open letter to his fans, coming clean about his battle with alcohol and prescription pills. On August 7, 2013, Brendon Urie announced via the band's website that Smith would no longer be taking part in the tour, stating that "He is away getting the help that he needs." On April 2, 2015, Smith announced his departure from Panic! at the Disco due to his addictions.

On October 18, 2025, Smith made a surprise appearance at When We Were Young to perform "I Write Sins Not Tragedies" with Panic! at the Disco. The show commemorated the 20th anniversary of A Fever You Can't Sweat Out, and marked Smith's first performance with the band in 12 years.
