= Jon Walker =

American musician (born 1985)

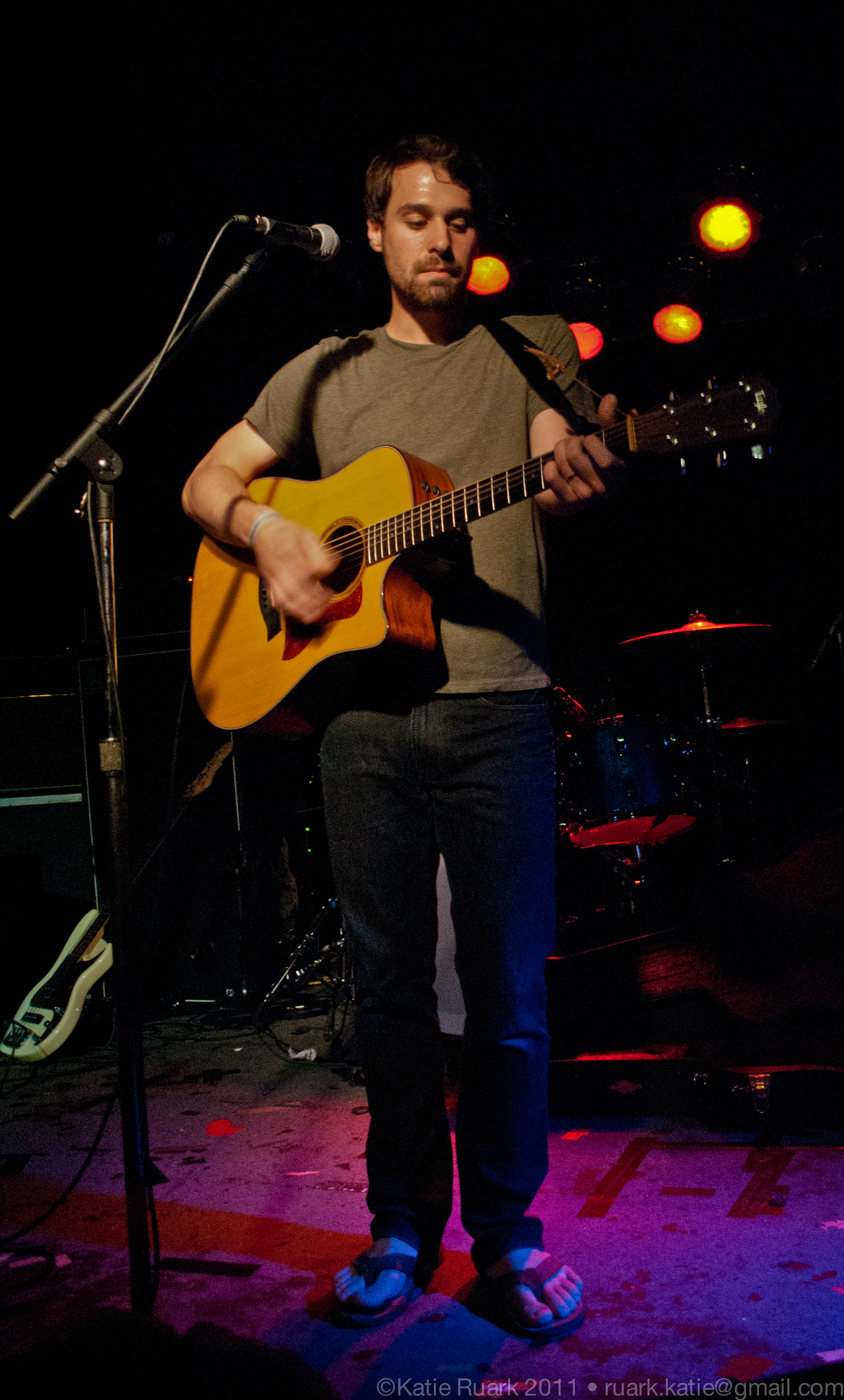
- Jon Walker performing at the Beat Kitchen, Chicago in 2011.

Background information
- Born: Jonathan Jacob Walker; September 17, 1985 (age 41)
- Origin: Hanover Park, Illinois, U.S.
- Genres: pop rock; psychedelic rock; pop
- Occupations: Singer-songwriter; musician; record producer
- Instruments: Vocals; guitar; bass; piano; keyboards
- Years active: 2003–present
- Formerly of: The Young Veins; Panic! at the Disco
- Spouse: Cassie Walker (m. 2011)
- Website: jonwalkermusic.com

Jonathan Jacob Walker (born September 17, 1985) is an American musician, singer, songwriter, and record producer. Formerly the bassist of Panic! at the Disco, Walker was also the guitarist and co-vocalist of The Young Veins (which he founded with former Panic! at the Disco guitarist and songwriter Ryan Ross), which is now on indefinite hiatus. Having gone on to release several solo recordings, he is now mostly songwriting and producing.

== Musical career ==
Walker attended Bartlett High School in Bartlett, Illinois and first became known in the Chicago scene in 2003 when he was just 17 years old as the replacement bass player for 504 Plan. Walker then toured with The Academy Is... as a guitar tech and a videographer. Walker joined Panic! at the Disco in May 2006, replacing former bassist Brent Wilson. At the time he joined, he was 20 years old, making him the oldest band member. Walker was with Panic! at the Disco when they won the video of the year award at the 2006 MTV Video Music Awards for their song "I Write Sins Not Tragedies". He co-wrote and released one studio album with the band, Pretty. Odd., and one live album, ...Live in Chicago.

In July 2009, he and fellow band member Ryan Ross left Panic! at the Disco, citing creative differences, and formed another band, The Young Veins. The Young Veins completed two tours in 2010, one with Foxy Shazam and one with Rooney. On December 10, 2010, Walker announced via Twitter that The Young Veins would be on hiatus, later noting in interviews that the creative and personal differences of the past carried over to the new project.

Since 2011, he has self-released three studio albums and four EPs, all of which are currently available for free download from his official Bandcamp page. He has also released a song with Victoria Asher, formerly of Cobra Starship, titled "When Push Comes to Shove" on December 15, 2016. On July 24, 2018, the short film Intermission was released, for which Walker composed the original score. In an interview with Valentino Petrarca from The Aquarian, he confirmed that he has not seen Panic! at the Disco live since his departure.

== Discography ==
Studio albums:

- New Songs (2011)
- Connections (2014)
- Different (2021)

EPs:

- Home Recordings (2011)
- Crazy Dream (2012)
- Real Life (2015)
- Impending Bloom (2019)

=== Panic! at the Disco ===
Studio albums:

- Pretty. Odd. (2008)

Live albums:

- ...Live in Chicago (2008)
- Live in Denver (2025)

=== The Young Veins ===
Studio albums:

- Take a Vacation! (2010)
