= Ryan Ross =

American guitarist (born 1986)

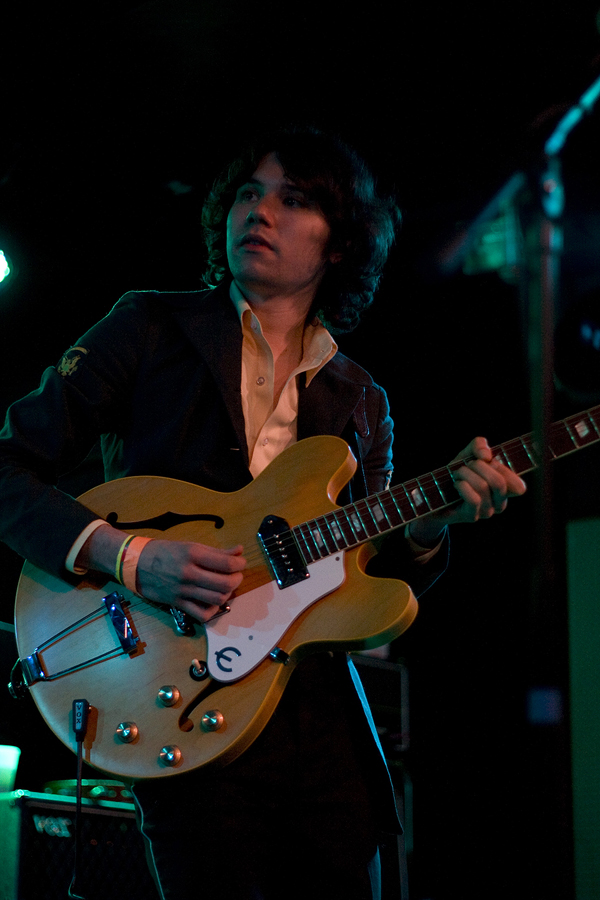
- Ross performing in 2010

Background information
- Born: George Ryan Ross III; August 30, 1986 (age 39); Las Vegas, Nevada, U.S.
- Genres: Baroque pop; pop rock; psychedelic rock; pop punk; emo pop
- Occupations: Singer; songwriter; musician
- Instruments: Vocals; guitar
- Years active: 2004–2010; 2013–2021; 2025
- Formerly of: Panic! at the Disco; The Young Veins

George Ryan Ross III (born August 30, 1986) is an American musician, singer, and songwriter best known for his work as the former lead guitarist, backing and lead vocalist, and primary songwriter of the American rock band Panic! at the Disco before his departure in 2009. He alongside former Panic! bassist Jon Walker formed the Young Veins later that same year, in which Ross was the lead vocalist and guitarist.

== Biography ==
=== Musical beginnings (1998–2004) ===
Born in Las Vegas, Nevada, Ross received a guitar for Christmas when he was 12, and began collaborating with best friend Spencer Smith who received a drum kit. Ross and Smith mostly covered Blink-182 songs with Ross on vocals. Their two-piece band was originally called Pet Salamander. Ross wrote lyrics to his first song when he was 14 years old.

They teamed up with Brent Wilson and another boy named Trevor Howell on guitar to make "Summer League" before they met Brendon Urie and formed Panic! at the Disco.

=== Panic! at the Disco (2004–2009) ===
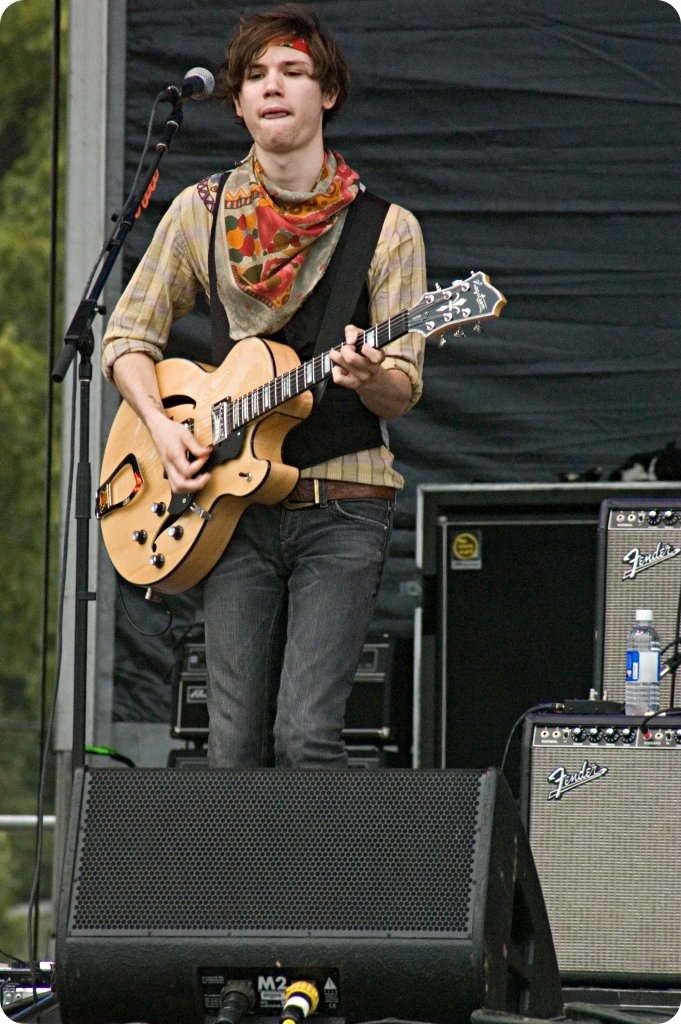
Ross performing with Panic! at the Disco in 2007

Ross, along with Spencer Smith, Brendon Urie and Brent Wilson, formed Panic! at the Disco in 2004. The band's debut album, A Fever You Can't Sweat Out was recorded between the time frame of mid-June to mid-July 2005 and was released on September 27, 2005.

With much success and touring of their debut album, the band went back into the studio in October 2007 to record what came to be the band's second studio album, Pretty. Odd., which was released on March 25, 2008; the sound greatly differed to the band's debut album. This was the last studio album Ross has contributed to with Panic!, though he was given a writing credit on "Nearly Witches (Ever Since We Met...)," from the band's third studio album, Vices & Virtues, as the song's origins date back to before the departure of Ross and Walker from the band.

=== The Young Veins (2009–2010) ===
On July 13, 2009, Ross spoke with MTV about his split from the Panic! at the Disco. He stated that "the split had been in the cards for sometime now. It just took everyone a while to realize it". Ross told MTV that he and the remaining members of Panic! at the Disco are still good friends and had recently spoken over the Fourth of July weekend. Ross spoke about his and Walker's upcoming project as well. "He and Walker are writing and recording songs (with Pretty. Odd. producer Rob Mathes) at a lightning-quick pace, and they'll soon be revealing the fruits of their labor". On July 28 the group's name was revealed to be The Young Veins and the single "Change" was released onto the Internet.

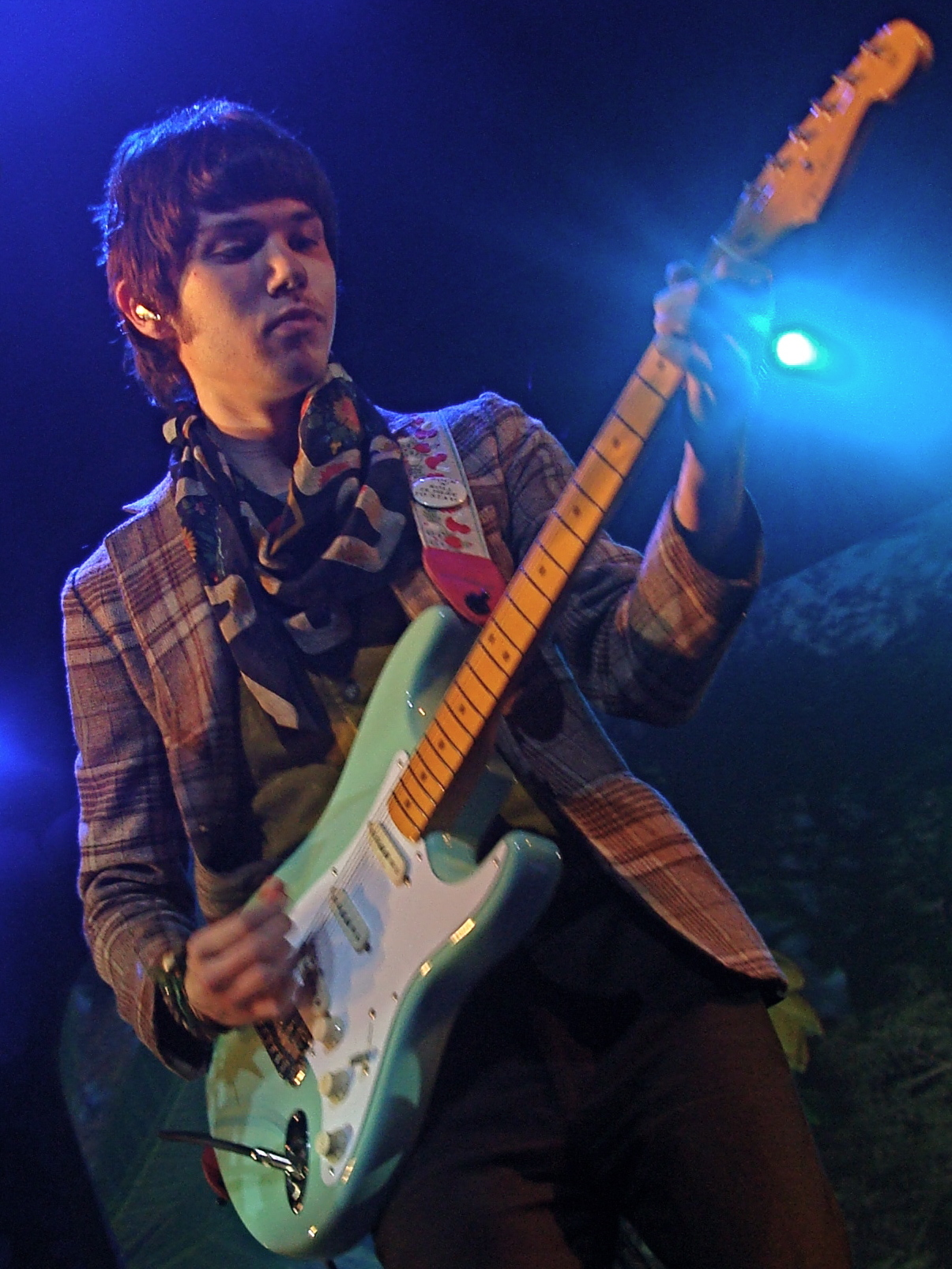
Ross performing with Panic! at the Disco in 2008

On July 15, 2009, Ross told MTV that the new sound he and Walker are working on is, "They're more, uh, I wouldn't want to say 'heavy,' but I guess I would have to, in the sense of, like, early garage music and Kinks and stuff. The songs are shorter and faster, and I guess they're more rock and roll than flowery stuff". In the same interview, he mentioned a lack of orchestration on the album, unlike Pretty. Odd., which was loaded with orchestration. He and Walker also recorded with the help of Alex Greenwald from Phantom Planet along with Panic!'s former touring keyboard player, Eric Ronick. According to Ross, he and Walker were attempting to release their new single tentatively titled, "Change". However, Ross was contractually bound to Fueled by Ramen to provide new music whereas Walker was not. Ross hoped to be released from his contract with Fueled by Ramen "because it doesn't seem like it's going to be the right place for this stuff, and I think everybody knows that, on both sides, [FBR President] John Janick included. It's just been taking some time to get worked out."

On October 16, Ross had an interview with MTV saying that their first record, Take a Vacation!, was done, and that they were working to find a record company willing to release it.

The Young Veins were signed to One Haven Music and their debut was released on June 8, 2010. On December 10, 2010, the Young Veins entered on a hiatus period.

=== Solo project (2013–present) ===
In 2013, Ross released a two-track untitled demo EP as well as a couple of other songs through his official SoundCloud page. The description of the page says: "Thanks for waiting. I'm back now."

In 2018, Ross collaborated with Z Berg on the Christmas single "The Bad List". In an interview with Alternative Press regarding the single, Ross stated that he "...will be in the studio recording songs for his next solo release over the next few weeks and into [2019]."

== Other projects ==
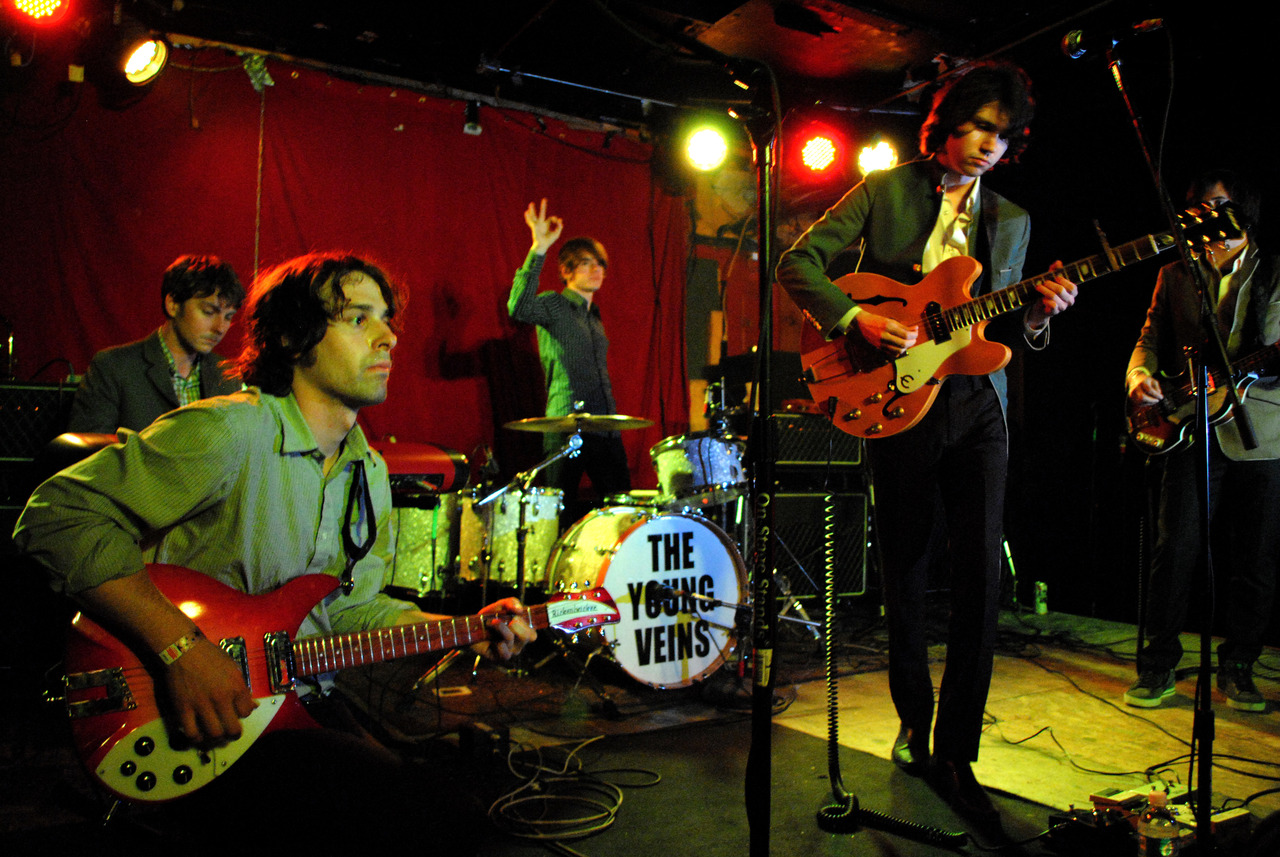
The Young Veins performing in 2010

Ross appeared along with former bandmates Brendon Urie, Spencer Smith, and Jon Walker in the Gym Class Heroes music video for the song "Clothes Off!!". He also appears with them in The Cab's music video for "One of THOSE Nights", along with Fall Out Boy members Patrick Stump and Pete Wentz.

In 2011, Ross was credited as a composer on ex-band Panic! at the Disco album Vices & Virtues for the track "Nearly Witches (Ever Since We Met...)", a song that was originally created while Ross and Walker were still in the band. He also recorded a song titled "Superbowl Hero" with Alex Greenwald and Michael Runion under a new band, RAM (Ryan, Alex, Michael).

Ross also provided backing vocals for "Stuck In Love", a song from William Beckett's solo EP What Will Be in autumn 2012.

In 2012, Ross featured on More Amor's single "Beach Bones".

In 2019, it was announced Ross was in The Dead End Kids Club alongside Z Berg, Dan Keyes, and Palm Springsteen. They toured for seven shows together which concluded on October 31, 2019.

Ross performed alongside former Panic! at the Disco member Dallon Weekes at a Phantom Planet benefit concert for the Los Angeles fires on February 1, 2025, performing the band's song "Do the Panic".

== Discography ==
With Panic! at the Disco

- A Fever You Can't Sweat Out (2005)
- Pretty. Odd. (2008)

With The Young Veins

- Take a Vacation! (2010)

Guest Performances

- "The Take Over, The Breaks Over" (by Fall Out Boy, guitar solo, 2007)
- Taisez moi (by Didier Wampas, guitars, 2011)
- "Beach Bones" (by More Amor, vocals, 2012)
- "Stuck in Love" (by William Beckett, vocals, 2012)
- "The Bad List" (by Z Berg, vocals, 2018)
- "Lonesome Town" (by Z Berg, vocals, 2021)

Other Appearances

- "You Can't Put Your Arms Round a Memory" (from The Dead End Kids Club compilation, 2019)

Remixes

- "The Grey Cardinal - Ryan Ross Remix" (by Collapsing Scenery, remix, 2021)
