= The Brobecks =

American indie pop band

- Origin: Salt Lake City, Utah, U.S.
- Genres: Indie pop; pop rock; electropop; power pop
- Years active: 2002–2013; 2024–present
- Spinoffs: I Dont Know How but They Found Me
- Spinoff of: 1000 West
- Members: Dallon Weekes; Michael Gross; Matt Glass; Bryan Szymanski
- Past members: See band members

The Brobecks are an American indie pop band formed in 2002 in Salt Lake City, Utah. Led by vocalist and bassist Dallon Weekes, the band experienced numerous lineup changes throughout the 2000s and reunited in 2024. Its current members include Weekes, vocalist and guitarist Michael Gross, drummer Matt Glass, and keyboardist Bryan Szymanski. The Brobecks have released four studio albums: Understanding the Brobecks (2003); Happiest Nuclear Winter (2005); Goodnight, and Have a Pleasant Tomorrow (2006); and Violent Things (2009).

== History ==
=== 1996–2002: 1000 West and band formation ===
In 1996, the band 1000 West was formed by multi-instrumentalist and lead vocalist Scott Jones, bassist Dallon Weekes, drummer Matt Glass, and guitarist Cory Rowley. Starting as cover band for the Beatles, they released multiple original albums through the late 1990s. Two of their albums include the track "School Bell", which was later repurposed into the song "Monday Morning" for the Brobecks and "Far Too Young to Die" for Panic! at the Disco. After cycling through different band members, they disbanded in the early 2000s. In 2002, most of the original members of 1000 West formed a new band named the Brobecks, swapping Rowley for guitarist Michael Gross. The band name was inspired by when the members heard the name Jamie Brobeck via a school intercom. This sparked curiosity as to who she was, but nobody knew. The band was named after Brobeck as an "homage to the unpopular".

=== 2003: The 4th of JuLive and Understanding the Brobecks ===
The Brobecks began writing their first album throughout 2003, recording it in early July and titling it The 4th of JuLive. On July 14, Jones left the band and took the songs he had written and sung with him. The sudden lack of material led the band to scrap the album. Keyboardist Bryan Szymanski and guitarist Casey Durrans were recruited following the event, while Weekes and Gross became the lead members. The Brobecks began constructing a new album in September, releasing Understanding the Brobecks on December 19 as their debut studio album. Recording and production were primarily done using an 8-track recorder in the band's garage. The Brobecks' first concert was performed at Kilby Court in Salt Lake City, Utah, which was attended solely by family members and coworkers of the band. The album's online promotion was handled by Glass, who was proficient in technology and created a website to host music videos. He additionally ran the band's MySpace page, furthering their audience reach.

=== 2004–2005: Happiest Nuclear Winter ===
The Brobecks recorded and produced their second studio album in 2004, titled Happiest Nuclear Winter. They partnered with Never Break Records to release it on January 22, 2005, additionally performing an album release show at Kilby Court. The concert was their first major show, with prior performances in the venue and other concerts primarily including family and friends. This became a motivating factor for Weekes to pursue music, feeling appreciated for his work professionally. The album received favorable reviews upon release; Bill Frost of Salt Lake City Weekly highlighted the album's memorable energy and tone, while Nate Martin of SLUG complimented its somber lyricism and juxtapositioning instrumentation. During this time, the band began receiving interest from record labels. They were offered a contract from an imprint of Drive-Thru Records, and Weekes was offered solo record contracts by Sony BMG and Interscope Records if he would drop his bandmates, but all offers were declined as the band wished to remain independent and unsigned.

=== 2005–2006: Lineup changes and Goodnight, and Have a Pleasant Tomorrow ===
On June 28, 2005, Glass and Szymanski left the Brobecks, who were later replaced by keyboardist and trumpeter Dave Chisholm and drummer Nate Leslie. They released a self-titled EP with the new members on August 20, 2005, which prominently featured songs to be included on their third studio album. They began recording their next project in early January 2006, finishing it in February and releasing Goodnight, and Have a Pleasant Tomorrow on April 15. It features the tracks "Heartbreak or Death" and "I'll Be Fine", which, alongside the single "Aeroplanes", are the only songs recorded by the Brobecks that Weekes sang but didn't write. Weekes retroactively disliked the album, stating "I guess I just didn't have my heart in it when we made it" on the album's Bandcamp release page.

=== 2007–2013: Violent Things and dissolvement ===
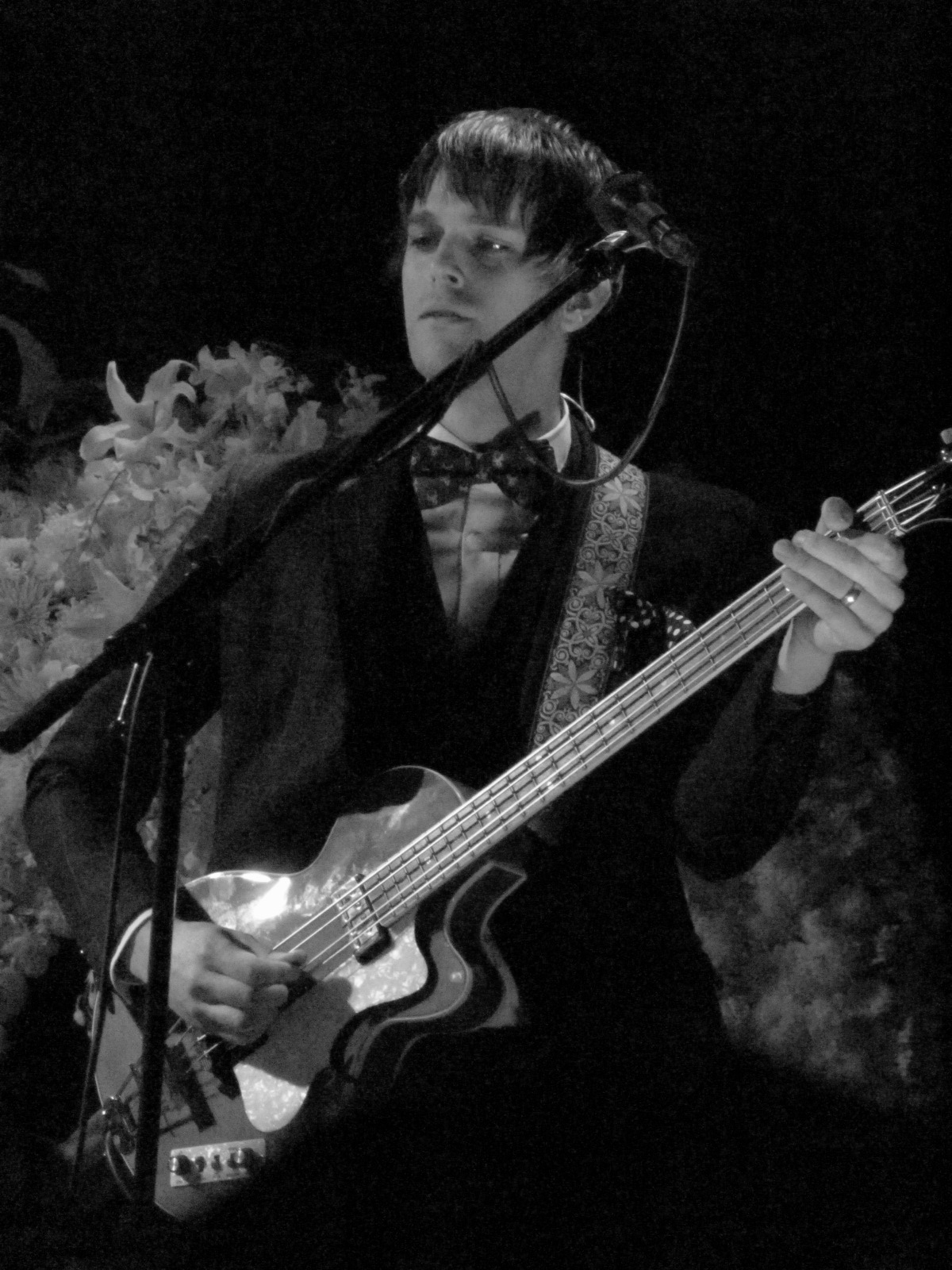
Weekes performing with Panic! at the Disco in 2011

In early 2007, all members besides Weekes left the Brobecks. Chisholm described the band's tastes as growing distant and felt an overall lack of interest in the music industry, leading him to pursue a career as a cartoonist. As the sole member, Weekes moved to California and recruited guitarist Matt Seppi and drummer Drew Davidson. They released the EP Small Cuts on September 29, 2007, followed later in the year by the holiday single "Christmas Drag", which was available through the band's MySpace page. On June 3, 2008, Ryan Seaman joined the Brobecks as a drummer. The band then released the EP I Will, Tonight on September 27. Both extended plays featured various songs for their fourth studio album, Violent Things, which was released on April 25, 2009.

Produced by Casey Crescenzo, the album was left unfinished due to time and money constraints. Multiple songs included are re-recorded from other albums by the Brobecks, specifically picking out tracks Weekes wrote. Violent Things acted as a replacement for the Brobecks' other albums, which were taken down from streaming services following its release. It is the only album by the band to feature Weekes as lead vocalist of every song, and overall received widespread positive reception. One of its songs, "Second Boys Will Be First Choice", was added to KXRK's daily rotation and became number one on the radio station following its addition.

Feeling that the Brobecks had grown stale, Weekes considered starting over under the name I Dont Know How but They Found Me. This plan was put on hold, however, as record executive John Janick of record label Fueled by Ramen suggested that he audition to join the band Panic! at the Disco. He was subsequently recruited on July 30, 2009, initially as a touring musician. Weekes released a cover of "Skid Row (Downtown)" from Little Shop of Horrors (1982) on September 3, 2010, featuring additional vocals from Brendon Urie. On November 5, 2012, the Brobecks released the EP Quiet Title. Featuring the songs "Anyone I Know" and "Clusterhug", it was recorded and produced by former member Matt Glass. The Brobecks performed their final show on May 4, 2013.

=== 2017–2024: Whisperhawk and I Dont Know How but They Found Me ===
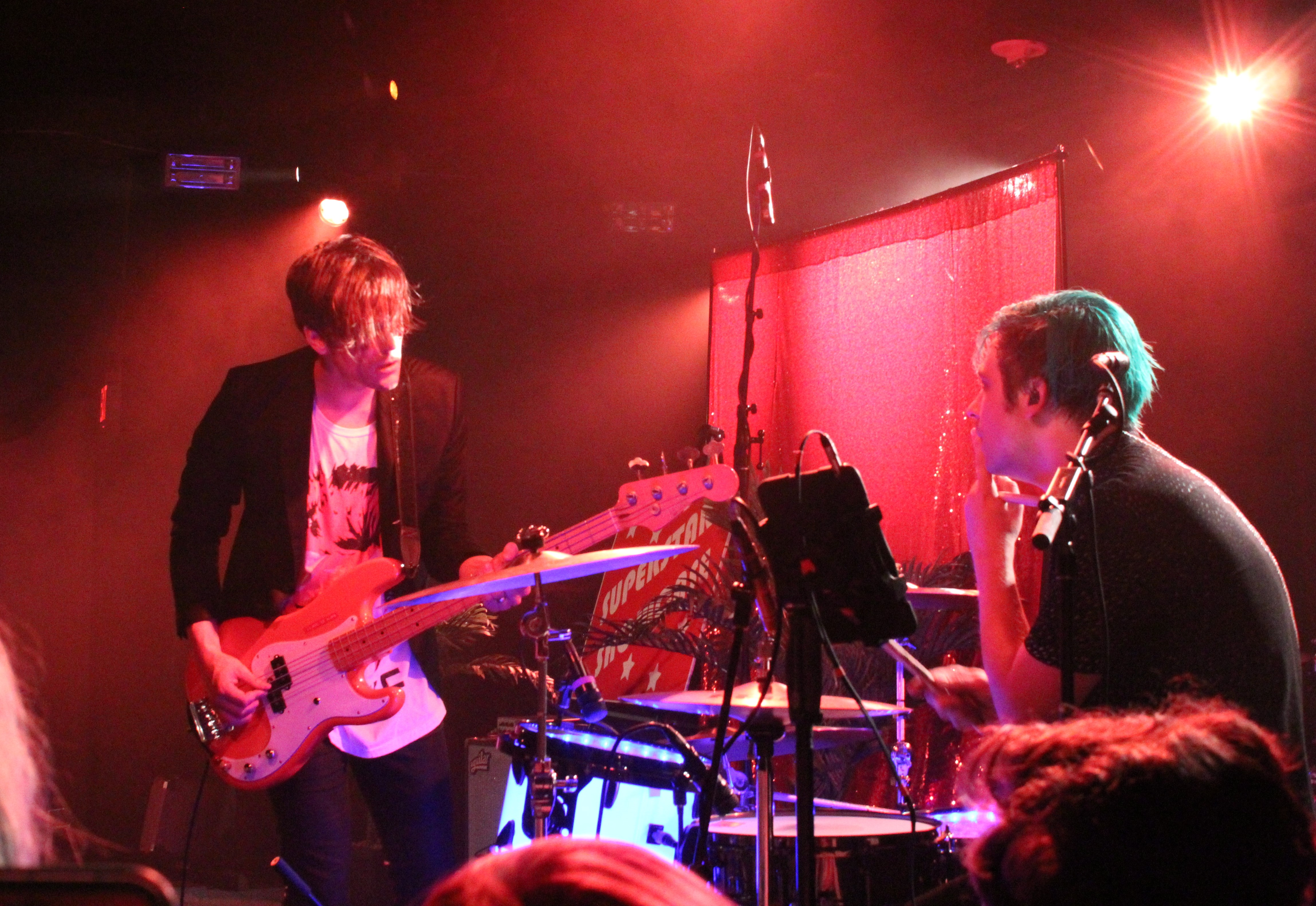
I Dont Know How but They Found Me at Union Stage in Washington, D.C. in 2018

Michael Gross began a solo project under the name Whisperhawk, releasing an EP in 2017 and his debut album Larks in 2018. The album features collaborations from Matt Glass and Art Webb, the latter being a member of a band the Brobecks opened for in the past. Simultaneously, Dallon Weekes began recording new material after departing from Panic! at the Disco in 2017. He had kept in contact with Seaman since the Brobecks' original dissolution, leading to the two becoming bandmates again to form the duo I Dont Know How but They Found Me. They described their style as picking up from where the band left off, incorporating power pop and new wave.

Weekes and Seaman additionally found it freeing to perform the Brobecks' music for an expanded audience, including the songs "Bike Ride", "Anyone I Know", "Boring", "A Letter" and "Visitation of the Ghost" in concerts. The latter two are performed with varying aspects of audience participation, with Weekes orchestrating harmonies for "A Letter" by dividing the crowd into sections and having them sing along. For "Visitation of the Ghost", the band parts the crowd to perform the song's bridge in the center. Weekes uses a megaphone to create a call and response system with its lyrics, ending the track by covering songs such as Chappell Roan's "Hot to Go!", Sabrina Carpenter's "Please Please Please", and Sophie Ellis-Bextor's "Murder on the Dancefloor".

In 2017, Weekes stated a desire to revisit a few songs made with the Brobecks as I Dont Know How but They Found Me. The first picked was "Christmas Drag", which would be re-recorded as the title track for the holiday EP Christmas Drag (2019). This was followed by "Clusterhug", re-recorded for the duo's debut studio album Razzmatazz (2020). Weekes later re-recorded the song "A Letter" for his second studio album, Gloom Division (2024), additionally collaborating with Matt Glass on the album. In April of the same year, Whisperhawk released a remastered version of Understanding the Brobecks (2003), including the seven out of twelve tracks he wrote and sang for it. Yonni Uribe of SLUG positively reviewed the new edition, commending its new level of clarity and smoothness in instrumentation and overall production.

=== 2024–present: Reunion and Not Dead Yet ===
Through the early 2020s, the Brobecks began trending online due to TikTok and Spotify, described by Weekes to be a breakthrough against the band's career plateau in their initial run. Until 2024, the only album available on streaming services was Violent Things. Other albums remained unavailable due to a lack of agreements for royalty distribution. In June 2024, Happiest Nuclear Winter was illegally uploaded to Spotify by a third-party, setting back a then-announced plan to re-release it officially. On December 10, 2024, the album was announced to be remastered and released onto streaming services for the first time on January 1, 2025, with participation from all four band members originally involved.

Alongside Happiest Nuclear Winter's re-release, the band announced Not Dead Yet, a documentary film that features interviews and archival footage of the Brobecks' first two albums. During an interview with Rock Sound in March 2025, the band confirmed they were back together and working on at least two new songs. They also entertained the possibility of a deluxe version of Happiest Nuclear Winter with demos and alternate mixes of songs. Not Dead Yet was screened at Megaplex Theatres in Salt Lake City on December 12. On April 16, 2026, Whisperhawk released an extended play of acoustic selections from Goodnight, and Have a Pleasant Tomorrow celebrating its 20th anniversary. Not Dead Yet had a limited Patreon release available from May 14 to June 15, and a DVD release that began pre-orders on June 24. A remastered edition of Understanding the Brobecks was released on August 17, 2026.

== Musical style and influences ==
The primary members of the Brobecks grew up in Salt Lake City, Utah, being exposed to various local hard rock bands. The band's distance from urban life led to a lack of pressure to match this sound, instead adapting a pop style with a focus on melodies. They've cited the Flaming Lips, Talking Heads, and Built to Spill as influences, refraining from making their music too conventional. Weekes has individually cited David Bowie, Sparks, Queen, Elvis Costello, Weezer, and the Beatles as influences for songwriting. The band has been described as indie pop, indie rock, electropop, and power pop.

The Brobecks have been an opening band or co-headliner for the Elected, Yellowcard, Hawthorne Heights, Soul Asylum, She Wants Revenge, the Red Jumpsuit Apparatus, Neon Trees, Phantom Planet, Snow Patrol, Fall Out Boy, the Ataris, Ludo, Trapt, Shiny Toy Guns, Atreyu, Jack's Mannequin, Mindless Self Indulgence, Local H, From First to Last, 10 Years, Hoobastank, Anberlin, Ben Kweller, and the Bravery.

== Discography ==
Studio albums

- Understanding the Brobecks (2003)
- Happiest Nuclear Winter (2005)
- Goodnight, and Have a Pleasant Tomorrow (2006)
- Violent Things (2009)

Remastered re-issues

- Happiest Nuclear Winter (2025)
- Understanding the Brobecks (2026)

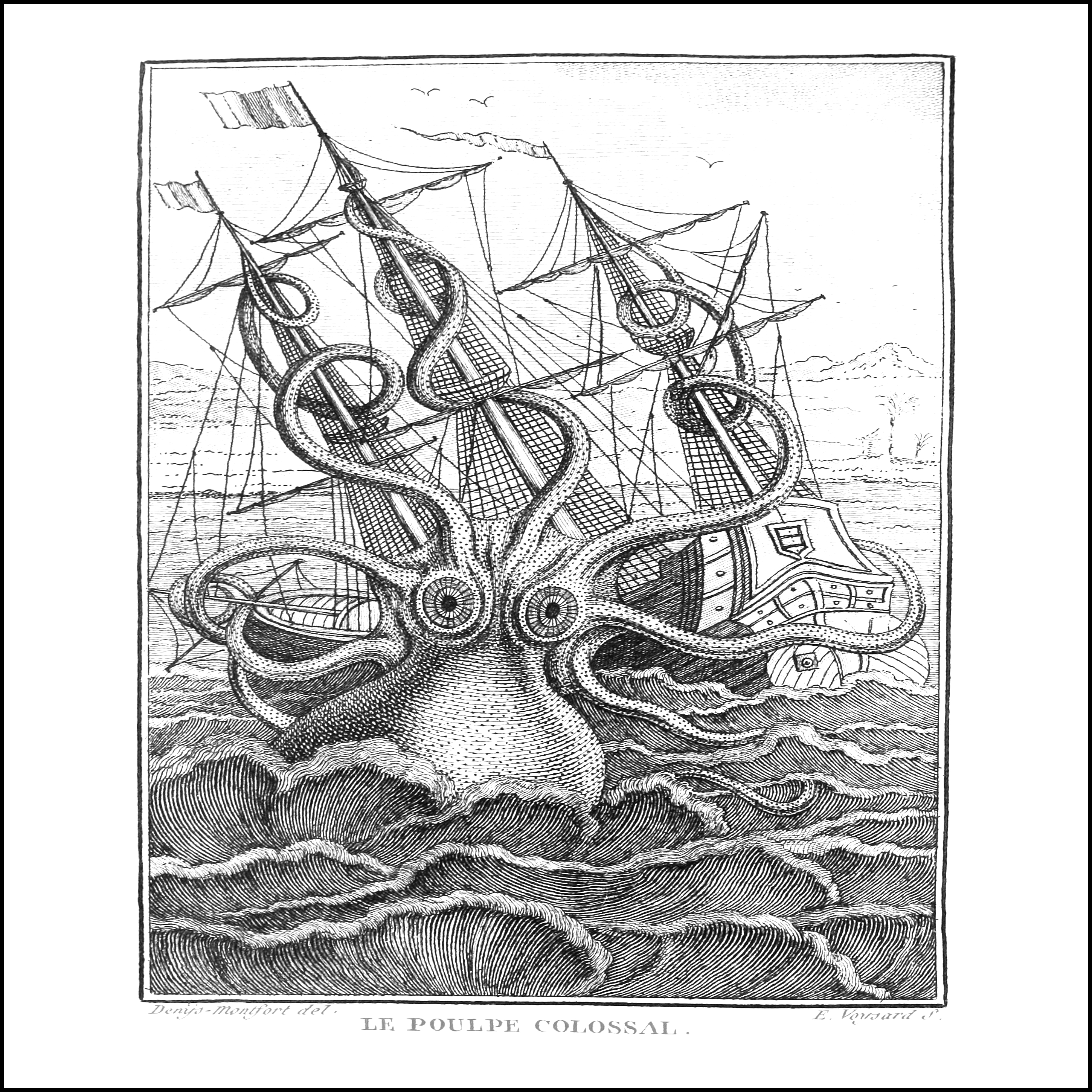
Your Mother Should Know #1, depicting Colossal Octopus

Extended plays

- Understanding the Brobecks Step 1: (2003)
- A Very Brobeck Christmas (2003)
- Remixing the Brobecks (2004)
- The Brobecks (2005)
- Small Cuts (2007)
- I Will, Tonight (2008)
- Your Mother Should Know #1 (2010)
- Quiet Title (2012)
- Boring (2020)

== Band members ==
Current members

- Dallon Weekes – lead vocals, bass guitar (2002–2013, 2024–present)
- Michael Gross – lead vocals, guitar (2002–2007, 2024–present)
- Matt Glass – drums, production (2002–2005, 2024–present)
- Bryan Szymanski – keyboards (2003–2005, 2024–present)

Former members

- Scott Jones – guitar, keyboards, vocals, drums (2002–2003)
- Casey Durrans – guitar (2003–2004)
- Nate Leslie – drums (2005–2007)
- Dave Chisholm – keyboards, trumpet (2005–2007)
- Drew Davidson – drums (2007–2009)
- Matt Seppi – keyboards, guitar (2007–2008)
- Josh Rheault – keyboards, guitar (2008–2009)
- Connor Doyle – guitar (2008–2009)
- Ryan Seaman – drums (2008–2009)

Note: this list is incomplete.
