= Hallelujah (Panic! at the Disco song) =

2015 single by Panic! at the Disco

Single by Panic! at the Disco

from the album Death of a Bachelor
- Released: April 20, 2015
- Genre: Pop rock; power pop; pop
- Length: 3:00
- Label: Fueled by Ramen; DCD2
- Songwriters: Brendon Urie; Aron Wright; Imad-Roy El-Amine; Morgan Kibby; Robert Lamm; Jake Sinclair
- Producers: Imad Royal; Jake Sinclair

Panic! at the Disco singles chronology
| "Nicotine" (2014) | "Hallelujah" (2015) | "Victorious" (2015) |

Music video
- "Hallelujah" on YouTube

"Hallelujah" is a song by American solo project Panic! at the Disco. It was released as a single on April 19, 2015 through Fueled by Ramen as the first single from their fifth studio album Death of a Bachelor. "Hallelujah" debuted at number 40 on the Billboard Hot 100 selling over 71,000 copies, becoming the band's second top-40 hit single and the first in nine years since "I Write Sins Not Tragedies" was released in 2006. It is the first single not to include drummer Spencer Smith and bassist Dallon Weekes, thus making "Hallelujah" Panic! at the Disco's first single as a solo project.

It has been digitally streamed over 165 million times on Spotify alone. "Hallelujah" was nominated for Song of the Year at the 2016 Alternative Press Music Awards.

== Background ==
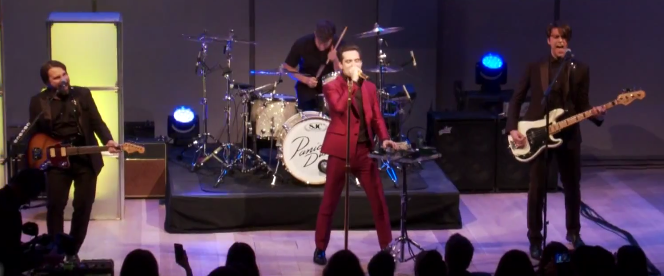
Panic! at the Disco at the 2015 Shorty Awards, where they first performed the song live.

When asked about the meaning of the song, Brendon Urie responded saying, "I mean, I grew up in a religious family and, like, that was a very big part of my life, and still, very much, is even though I don't affiliate with any specific religion. It's just, for me, you know, the spirituality of being able to own up to your sins, as they're called, and take responsibility for your actions really hit me this time around, and so that song really is about that, it's, you know, taking responsibility for things that you felt guilty for in the past and just owning it, because, now, that's a piece of you and you can't get rid of that history, so, that's really what it was. But it was a chance to, kind of also, you know, there's a little tagline in there that I throw out to our fans, I like to call them 'my sinners', and I'm a fellow sinner, and so I think that's a little special little throw-out to them." Urie later stated, "When you have to own up to your mistakes, you know, praise that; as long as you take responsibility for your actions, everything else seems it can fall into place if you have that same attitude, so, that's really what it was, it's kind of a play on just, 'yeah, you know, hallelujah, I'm not a sinner', but we are, I mean the song is definitely about that".

The opening of the song is taken from the Chicago song "Questions 67 and 68".

The song was performed live for the first time at the 7th annual Shorty Awards on Monday, April 20, 2015. At the Shorty Awards, the band also performed the single "Miss Jackson". The band also performed the single at the 2015 Alternative Press Music Awards along with a cover of "Bohemian Rhapsody" by Queen.

== Music video ==
The audio video for the single features the two hands raised emoji.

An audio video was uploaded to Fueled by Ramen's YouTube channel featuring racially diverse iOS preaching emoji.

On July 7, 2015, a music video was released for the song. The video is inspired by the game Monument Valley. As of December 2022, the music video has surpassed 73 million views.

== Track listing ==
All tracks written by Brendon Urie, Jake Sinclair, Morgan Kibby, Aron Wright and Imad-Roy El-Amine. "Hallelujah" samples "Questions 67 and 68" written by Robert Lamm and performed by Chicago.

Digital download
| No. | Title | Length |
|---|---|---|
| 1. | "Hallelujah" | 3:00 |

== Personnel ==
Panic! at the Disco

- Brendon Urie – lead and backing vocals, guitar, bass guitar, keyboards

Additional personnel

- Jake Sinclair – background vocals
- White Sea – background vocals
- Mark Stepro – drums
- Rob Mathes – horn arrangement

== Chart performance ==
=== Weekly charts ===
| Chart (2015–2016) | Peak position |
|---|---|
| Canada Hot 100 (Billboard) | 72 |
| UK Singles (Official Charts) | 81 |
| UK Rock & Metal (Official Charts) | 1 |
| US Billboard Hot 100 | 40 |
| US Hot Rock & Alternative Songs (Billboard) | 3 |

=== Year-end charts ===
| Chart (2015) | Position |
|---|---|
| US Hot Rock Songs (Billboard) | 21 |
| US Rock Airplay (Billboard) | 49 |

== Certifications ==
| Region | Certification | Certified units/sales |
|---|---|---|
| Canada (Music Canada) | Gold | 40,000^{‡} |
| New Zealand (RMNZ) | Gold | 15,000^{‡} |
| United Kingdom (BPI) | Silver | 200,000^{‡} |
| United States (RIAA) | Platinum | 1,000,000^{‡} |
^{‡} Sales+streaming figures based on certification alone.
