= Happiest Nuclear Winter =

Studio album by The Brobecks
- Released: January 22, 2005
- Recorded: May 14 – December 2, 2004
- Genre: Indie pop; electropop
- Length: 50:32
- Label: Never Break; None You Jerk
- Producer: Matt Glass

The Brobecks chronology
Understanding the Brobecks (2003)	Happiest Nuclear Winter (2005)	The Brobecks EP (2005)

Happiest Nuclear Winter is the second studio album by American indie pop band the Brobecks. Recorded and produced by Matt Glass, it was released by Never Break Records on January 22, 2005. One of the album's songs, "A Letter", was later re-recorded for I Dont Know How but They Found Me's second album, Gloom Division. The Brobecks released a remastered version of Happiest Nuclear Winter on January 1, 2025, distributing it through None You Jerk Records.

== Content and reception ==
Pretty ambitious for kids who still didn't know what they were doing. Recorded in my garage. Produced by a young upstart named Matt Glass.

—Dallon Weekes

Happiest Nuclear Winter contains 12 songs, primarily consisting of upbeat electropop instrumentation and juxtapositioning depressed lyrics. Bill Frost of Salt Lake City Weekly praised the album's combination of guitar, synth, piano, and vocals "sweet enough to make fillings ache in Albuquerque", likening it to music in the TV series The O.C. and The Atomic Cafe (1982). Nate Martin of SLUG echoed similar sentiments, complimenting its "near-jazz piano ditties" and favoring it to other indie albums. He additionally compared it to the works of Weezer, They Might be Giants, the Flaming Lips, and Alkaline Trio.

=== "A Letter" ===
"A Letter" is a song written by bassist Dallon Weekes, acting as a love letter. The track begins with a solo synth that transitions into a fully-backed instrumental, with Weekes vocalizing. It prominently features spoken word by drummer Matt Glass. Weekes wrote the song with harmonies intended to be replicated by concert attendees, but found that the Brobecks' fanbase was too small to meet his vision. It was additionally inspired by Dave Fridmann's music. Ed Walton of Distorted Sound Magazine compared the song's soundscape to Baz Luhrmann's "Everybody's Free (To Wear Sunscreen)".

After the formation of I Dont Know How but They Found Me between Weekes and Ryan Seaman, the duo initially had a short catalog of music. They chose to perform cover songs to lengthen concerts, including songs originally by the Brobecks. One of these was "A Letter", which stayed in their setlist as they wrote newer songs. Weekes noted that they had a large enough crowd song to perform the song properly, placing more importance in the unity of the audience than the song's original meaning. In 2024, a re-recorded version was included as the ninth track on the project's second studio album, Gloom Division (2024), produced and mixed by Fridmann. Glass' voice is edited to be deeper in tone, while the instrumental features more bells and a choir, made up of a crowd from a concert at The Depot that later closes the song.

== Release ==
Happiest Nuclear Winter released on January 22, 2005, issued physically on CD. An album release concert coincided with this at Kilby Court in Salt Lake City. Due to a lack of agreements for royalty payment distribution, the album wasn't re-issued after release, leading it to only be available in full on YouTube unofficially. On September 9, 2012, Weekes made the five songs he wrote and sang for the album available for purchase on Bandcamp. In June 2024, Happiest Nuclear Winter was illegally uploaded to Spotify and other streaming services. This set back an official re-release that was in development, and Weekes discouraged fans from supporting the upload before it was taken down later in the month. On December 10, 2024, the label's Instagram page posted a video teasing an official re-release of Happiest Nuclear Winter with the date January 1, 2025. Alongside its release, an upcoming documentary film titled Not Dead Yet was announced, featuring interviews and archival footage of the Brobecks' first two albums.

== Track listing ==
All songs written and arranged by Dallon Weekes and Michael Gross.

Happiest Nuclear Winter track listing
No.	Title	Length
1.	"C'mon Vietnam"	5:25
2.	"Better Than Me"	4:57
3.	"Everyone's a Jerk"	3:38
4.	"One Minute of Fun"	1:39
5.	"You Stole My Head"	5:49
6.	"Ollie"	3:59
7.	"A Letter"	2:50
8.	"And Shoot the Sun"	6:37
9.	"Boring"	1:42
10.	"File Code No. 1459"	4:52
11.	"Die Alone"	3:32
12.	"She's a Robot"	5:29
Total length:		50:32

B-Sides
No.	Title	Length
1.	"Christmas Drag"	3:54
2.	"Globular"	1:45
Total length:		56:11

== Personnel ==
Credits adapted from Matt Glass' website.

- Matt Glass – drums, orchestration, production, recording engineer
- Michael Gross – vocals, guitar
- Bryan Szymanski – keyboard, piano, synths
- Dallon Weekes – vocals, bass guitar
