= Clusterhug =

2012 song by the Brobecks

Song by The Brobecks

from the EP Quiet Title
- A-side: "Anyone I Know"
- Released: November 5, 2012
- Genre: Indie pop
- Length: 3:20
- Songwriter: Dallon Weekes
- Producer: Matt Glass

"Clusterhug" is a song written by Dallon Weekes. Originally intended for Panic! at the Disco's fourth studio album Too Weird to Live, Too Rare to Die! (2013), it was scrapped and released by indie pop band the Brobecks on November 5, 2012. It appears as the B-side of the extended play Quiet Title and a bonus track of their fourth studio album Violent Things (2009). The song was notably covered by American duo I Dont Know How but They Found Me.

== History ==
After becoming a member of Panic! at the Disco in 2009, Dallon Weekes wrote various songs for the band and released their demos as the Brobecks. One of these, "Far Too Young to Die", would be included on Panic! at the Disco's fourth studio album, Too Weird to Live, Too Rare to Die! (2013). Another song from the sessions was "Clusterhug", which was rejected as "too weird" for compositionally straying from modern pop song structures. After recording and producing a demo with Matt Glass, the Brobecks released it as the B-side of Quiet Title on November 5, 2012.

== Personnel ==
- Dallon Weekes – lead vocals, bass guitar, piano
- Matt Glass – drums, recording engineer, production
- Ian Crawford – lead guitar, harmonies, tambourine
- Augustine Rampolla – harmonies
- Breezy Douglas-Weekes – yelling
- Amelie Weekes – yelling
- Knox Weekes – yelling

== I Dont Know How but They Found Me version ==
"Clusterhug"

Song by I Dont Know How but They Found Me

from the album Razzmatazz
- Released: October 23, 2020
- Genre: Pop rock
- Length: 3:12
- Label: Fearless Records
- Songwriter: Dallon Weekes
- Producer: Dallon Weekes

Audio
- "Clusterhug" on YouTube

American rock duo I Dont Know How but They Found Me recorded a cover of "Clusterhug" for their debut studio album, Razzmatazz (2020). As a member of the duo, Weekes intended to give the song a second chance with higher-end production quality and adjusted lyricism. The cover was met with favorable reviews upon release.

=== Reception ===
Neil Yeung of AllMusic likened its intricate harmonies to Queen while commending the song's sparkly composition, equating it to Muse's song "Starlight". Katie Conway-Flood of Bring the Noise made a similar comparison to Muse, additionally mentioning the Killers and highlighting the track as a standout on Razzmatazz. Tina Benitez-Eves of Flood Magazine described its orchestration as "more lovelorn balladry", while Spencer Fleming of Stories from the Crowd called "Clusterhug" his favorite song of the band for its 1950s musical style. Initially a fan of the Brobecks' demo, Danielle Tierney of Raider Reader praised the song's refined bassline and elegant lyricism.

Jack Rogers of Rock Sound extensively praised the cover, labeling it a "shimmering masterpiece" for its captivating combination of bass and piano. He additionally accentuated its chorus as anthemic and the ending crescendo as elevating. Kelsey Trevan of Wall of Sound felt similarly about the ending, feeling bittersweet about its solemn fade out with a crash cymbal. During shows by I Dont Know How but They Found Me, "Clusterhug" is performed with soft lighting and placed around other moody songs. It has often been cited as a highlight in the band's setlist, receiving the most applause compared to other performances.

=== Personnel ===
- Dallon Weekes – lead vocals, piano, production
- Ryan Seaman – tambourine, jingle bell
- Tim Pagnotta – recording engineer, mixing engineer
- Brian Phillips – recording engineer, mixing engineer
- Michelle Mancini – mastering engineer
- Taylor Reyes – assistant engineer
