= What Love? =

What Love? may refer to:

- "What Love?", a single from I Dont Know How but They Found Me's album Gloom Division
- "What Love?", a song from Moby's album Everything Is Wrong
