= This Is Gospel =

2013 single by Panic! at the Disco

Single by Panic! at the Disco

from the album Too Weird to Live, Too Rare to Die!
- Released: August 12, 2013
- Recorded: November 2012 – March 2013
- Genre: Pop rock; emo
- Length: 3:07
- Label: Decaydance; Fueled by Ramen
- Songwriters: Brendon Urie; Dallon Weekes; Jake Sinclair
- Producer: Butch Walker

Panic! at the Disco singles chronology
| "Miss Jackson" (2013) | "This Is Gospel" (2013) | "Girls / Girls / Boys" (2013) |

Music videos
- "This Is Gospel" on YouTube; "This Is Gospel" (piano version) on YouTube

"This Is Gospel" is a song by American rock band Panic! at the Disco. It was released as the second single from their fourth studio album, Too Weird to Live, Too Rare to Die!, on August 12, 2013. A music video for the song, directed by Daniel "Cloud" Campos, was also released on the same day. It peaked at number 87 on the Billboard Hot 100 singles chart.

== Music video ==
The music video for "This Is Gospel" was released on August 12, 2013, coinciding with the song's single release, through Fueled by Ramen's YouTube channel. It was directed by Daniel "Cloud" Campos.

The music video for the band's song "Emperor's New Clothes" is a direct continuation of this video, just as the music video for the band's song "Say Amen (Saturday Night)" is the prequel to this video.

== Charts ==
=== Weekly charts ===
Weekly chart performance for "This Is Gospel"
| Chart (2013–2014) | Peak position |
|---|---|
| Canada Hot 100 (Billboard) | 95 |
| UK Singles (Official Charts Company) | 179 |
| US Billboard Hot 100 | 87 |
| US Hot Rock & Alternative Songs (Billboard) | 12 |
| US Rock & Alternative Airplay (Billboard) | 45 |

=== Year-end charts ===
Year-end chart performance for "This Is Gospel"
| Chart (2013) | Position |
|---|---|
| US Hot Rock Songs (Billboard) | 87 |

== Certifications ==
Certifications for "This Is Gospel"
| Region | Certification | Certified units/sales |
|---|---|---|
| Canada (Music Canada) | Gold | 40,000^{‡} |
| New Zealand (RMNZ) | Gold | 15,000^{‡} |
| United Kingdom (BPI) | Gold | 400,000^{‡} |
| United States (RIAA) | 3× Platinum | 3,000,000^{‡} |
^{‡} Sales+streaming figures based on certification alone.

== Release history ==
Release dates and formats for "This Is Gospel"
| Country | Date | Format | Label |
|---|---|---|---|
| United States | August 12, 2013 | Digital download | Decaydance Records, Fueled by Ramen |
| United States | February 4, 2014 | Alternative radio | Decaydance Records, Fueled by Ramen |
