= WNYO =

WNYO may refer to:

- WNYO (FM), a radio station (88.9 FM) licensed to Oswego, New York, United States
- WNYO-TV, a television station (channel 16, virtual 49) licensed to Buffalo, New York, United States
