= Violent Things =

Studio album by The Brobecks
- Released: April 25, 2009
- Recorded: 2009
- Genres: Indie rock; indie pop; alternative rock; pop; pop rock; baroque pop
- Length: 49:57
- Labels: None, You Jerk
- Producers: Casey Crescenzo; Dallon Weekes

The Brobecks chronology
I Will, Tonight (2008)	Violent Things (2009)	Your Mother Should Know #1 (2010)

Violent Things is the fourth studio album by American indie pop band the Brobecks. Written by lead vocalist and bassist Dallon Weekes, with production by Casey Crescenzo, it was independently released on April 25, 2009.

== Background ==
In contrast to the Brobecks' previous three albums, Dallon Weekes is the sole writer of Violent Things. Weekes recorded the album's 15 songs over a week-and-a-half period with producer Casey Crescenzo in his home basement studio in Boston, Massachusetts. It was published without mixing or mastering due to budget constraints, leading to a retroactive dissatisfaction with the album.

== Reception ==
Although the album had little success upon release, it became a trend on TikTok in the early 2020s. The song "Better Than Me" received particular attention for its self-deprecating content, amassing over 85 million streams on Spotify. Claire Cicero of The Red & Black praised the distorted bass, harmonies, and lyricism of "All of the Drugs", complimenting its momentum from a minimalistic start. Davy Washington of The Bullet highlighted the track "Boring" as an anthemic encapsulation of the album's sorrow, building from soft piano and vocals into an electronic instrumental burst.

== Re-recordings ==
In 2011, "Visitation of the Ghost" was re-recorded for a planned Brobecks EP, but this was scrapped after Weekes joined Panic! at the Disco as a bassist. It was later released as a single. Re-recorded editions of "Love at First Sight" and "Second Boys Will Be First Choice" were leaked on multiple occasions under an EP titled This Is Heavy along with a demo for "Far Too Young To Die," used later on the Panic! at the Disco album Too Weird to Live, Too Rare to Die! (which was leaked on SoundCloud prior). Weekes has stated that these were released without his consent, by a third-party, to make money off of his old songs and demos, and requested they not be streamed online.

After the formation of I Dont Know How but They Found Me between Weekes and Ryan Seaman, the duo initially had a short catalog of music. They chose to perform cover songs to lengthen concerts, including songs originally by the Brobecks. Three of these are from Violent Things: "Visitation of the Ghost", "Boring", and "Clusterhug". The latter was proposed as a demo to Panic! at the Disco, but the band declined. It would eventually appear re-recorded on I Dont Know How but They Found Me's debut album, Razzmatazz (2020).

== Track listing ==
Violent Things track listing
No.	Title	Length
1.	"Goodnight Socialite"	3:19
2.	"Better Than Me"	4:27
3.	"Love at First Sight"	3:10
4.	"Second Boys Will Be First Choice"	3:15
5.	"Small Cuts"	4:02
6.	"If You Like It or Not"	3:30
7.	"Le Velo Pour Deux"	3:56
8.	"I Will, Tonight"	3:48
9.	"Visitation of the Ghost"	4:23
10.	"All of the Drugs"	1:59
11.	"Bike Ride"	3:25
12.	"The Nerve"	3:59
13.	"Boring"	6:44
Total length:		49:57

Reissue bonus tracks
No.	Title	Length
14.	"Anyone I Know"	2:40
15.	"Clusterhug"	3:20
Total length:		55:57

Bandcamp anniversary bonus track
No.	Title	Length
14.	"Visitation of the Ghost" (2011 fancy studio version)	4:07
Total length:		54:04

Alternate streaming tracklist
No.	Title	Length
1.	"If You Like It or Not"	3:30
2.	"Small Cuts"	4:02
3.	"All of the Drugs"	1:59
4.	"Better Than Me"	4:27
5.	"Love at First Sight"	3:10
6.	"Visitation of the Ghost"	4:23
7.	"The Nerve"	3:59
8.	"I Will, Tonight"	3:48
9.	"Goodnight Socialite"	3:19
10.	"Bike Ride"	3:25
11.	"Le Velo Pour Deux"	3:56
12.	"Second Boys Will Be First Choice" (radio version)	3:15
13.	"Boring"	6:44
Total length:		49:57

== Personnel ==
Credits adapted from the album's Bandcamp page.

- Dallon Weekes – lead vocals, bass, guitar, keyboards
- Drew Davidson – drums
- Casey Crescenzo – production, guitar, piano
- Lyndsey Lesh – album artwork
- Bill Ferenc – typography
