= Gloom Division =

Studio album by I Dont Know How but They Found Me
- Released: February 23, 2024
- Recorded: November 9, 2022–January 2023
- Studio: Tarbox Road Studios
- Genres: Art-pop; post-punk; R&B; indie pop; glam rock; electronic rock
- Length: 39:21
- Label: Concord Records
- Producers: Dave Fridmann; Dallon Weekes

I Dont Know How but They Found Me chronology
Razzmatazz B-Sides (2021)	Gloom Division (2024)

Singles from Gloom Division
- 1. "What Love?" Released: October 5, 2023; 2. "Gloomtown Brats" Released: December 7, 2023; 3. "Infatuation" Released: January 11, 2024; 4. "Downside" Released: February 23, 2024

Gloom Division (stylized in all caps) is the second studio album by American indie pop solo project I Dont Know How but They Found Me. It was released through Concord Records on February 23, 2024. The album marks the first release by I Dont Know How but They Found Me as a solo act fronted by Dallon Weekes after drummer Ryan Seaman was fired from the band. Gloom Division was co-produced by Weekes and Dave Fridmann.

== Background ==
Following the positive reception of their debut album, Razzmatazz, the project began working on their sophomore effort. Dallon Weekes drew inspiration from a variety of sources as the creative force, including his personal experiences and influences ranging from 70s glam rock to 90s R&B. Weekes embarked on a journey of introspection, particularly following an Autism and ADHD diagnosis, which influenced the themes explored in Gloom Division. The album reflects Weekes' growth as a musician and songwriter, showcasing a blend of dark lyrics with upbeat melodies.

Gloom Division features collaborations with various musicians, including Will Joseph Cook, Charlie Brand, and members of Louis XIV. Dallon Weekes also worked with producer Dave Fridmann, known for his work with artists such as the Flaming Lips and MGMT, to realize his vision for the album. Fridmann's expertise helped shape the sound of the record, allowing Weekes to explore a diverse range of musical styles while maintaining a cohesive sonic identity.

"A Letter", the ninth track on the album, originally appeared on the Brobecks' album Happiest Nuclear Winter (2005). Written by Weekes, the song has been performed by I Dont Know How but They Found Me since tours supporting the band's 1981 Extended Play (2018), eventually being re-recorded for Gloom Division.

== Promotion ==
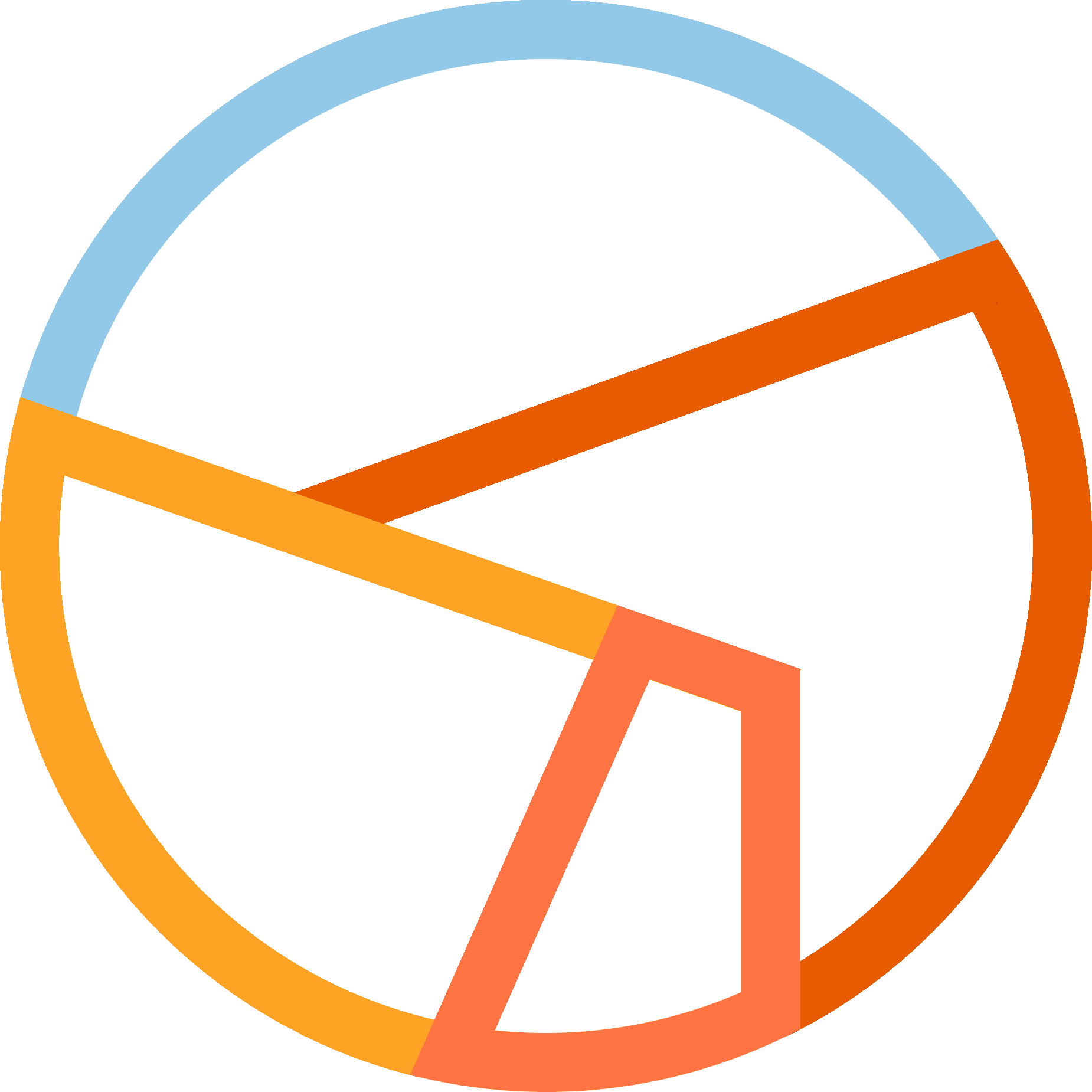
Abstract logo used for the Gloomtown Tour.

On September 16, 2023, Weekes announced the new album via Instagram, along with the departure of bandmate and drummer Ryan Seaman after "a series of broken trusts". The project also signed a deal with Concord Records, which handled the release of Gloom Division.

On September 28, 2023, IDKHow announced "What Love?", a new single to be released the following week. When the song and its music video released on October 5, it was revealed that it was the first single from the upcoming album, Gloom Division. "Gloomtown Brats" was released as the album's second single on December 7. "Infatuation" released on January 11, 2024, as the third single before Gloom Division released on February 23.

Alongside the release of "Gloomtown Brats", the Gloomtown Tour was announced on December 7, 2023. Tickets became available via pre-sale the same day, with the general public receiving access the next day. I Dont Know How but They Found Me began the Gloomtown Tour on March 15, 2024, with 27 dates across the United States and Canada. Lead vocalist Weekes was accompanied on-stage by guitarist Anthony Purpura, bassist Isaac Paul, and drummer Ronnie Strauss.

In January 2024, shows were announced to take place in Europe with 14 dates across June and July. These tickets became available on February 2. Days before the European leg started, the band's tour bus exploded and was subsequently replaced with a bus gifted by Troye Sivan. This tour was followed by the Impending Gloom Tour, with 21 dates across the United States between October 26 and November 25.

== Reception ==
Professional ratings
Review scores
Source	Rating
AllMusic	3.5/5 stars
Distorted Sound	8/10 stars
DORK	4/5 stars
Kerrang!	4/5 stars
NARC.	5/5 stars
The Oswegonian	5/5 stars
The Post	4.5/5 stars
The Ramapo News	2/5 stars
Rolling Stone	4/5 stars
StereoBoard	3/5 stars

Gloom Division received generally favorable reviews. Lucy Carter of The Indiependent described the album as a "more mature release" than the project's debut, highlighting the sound as "sway[ing] between soft and sad to bold and bombastic". Distorted Sound, DORK, Kerrang!, and Rolling Stone each gave the album a rating of 8/10 or 4/5, with Ed Walton praising the album for its "infectious indie pop/emo bangers", Ali Shutler commending it for offering "escapism and joy in equal measure", James Hingle highlighting Weekes' evolution as a musician, and Frank Lähnemann lauding its varying soundscapes and glamour, respectively.

Laura Doyle of NARC. cites Seaman's departure for Weekes ability to "get more personal than ever before", giving Gloom Division a rating of 5/5. Juliana Lechtanski of The Oswegonian gave the same rating for Weekes' "creative liberties to give each song its own personality and sound", while The Post closely followed in a rating of 4.5/5 with Brooke Phillips describing the album as a "whacky pop soundscape".

Neil Z. Yeung of AllMusic gave the median rating of 3.5/5, complimenting it for "stylistic diversity and genre experimentation" but also stating that it's "bogged down by midtempo lounge-act material". StereoBoard gave similar positives and negatives in a review by Jacob Brookman, rating it a 3/5. He called the instrumentation excellent while disapproving the youthful lyricism in contrast to Weekes' age of 42 at the time of release. The Ramapo News reviewed Gloom Division less positively, as Jessica Hammer criticized the songs for not having "much distinguishable variation instrumentally" and giving a rating of 2/5.

== Track listing ==
All tracks produced by Dave Fridmann and Dallon Weekes. All tracks are stylized in all caps except "Idiots of Oz" (stylized as "iDIOTS OF Oz").

Gloom Division
No.	Title	Writer(s)	Length
1.	"Downside"	Dallon Weekes; Chad Murphy	3:32
2.	"Gloomtown Brats"	Weekes; Jason Hill	3:13
3.	"Infatuation"	Weekes; Hill; Daniel Michael Armbruster; Rick Alvin Schaier	3:27
4.	"What Love?"	Weekes; Murphy; Charlie Brand; Stuart Maxfield	3:15
5.	"Spkothdvl"	Weekes	3:01
6.	"Sixft"	Weekes; Josh Rheault	3:24
7.	"Find Me"	Weekes; Johnny Lucas; Ryan Seaman	3:21
8.	"Kiss & Tell"	Weekes; Will Joseph Cook; Emiliano Melis	3:28
9.	"A Letter"	Weekes	3:13
10.	"Satanic Panic"	Weekes; Armbruster; Wenzl McGowen; Michael Wilbur	3:06
11.	"Sunnyside" (featuring Will Joseph Cook)	Weekes; Cook; Noah Bobrow	3:16
12.	"Idiots of Oz"	Weekes; Brian Laurence Bennett; Alan Parker	3:00
Total length:			39:21

== Personnel ==
I Dont Know How but They Found Me

- Dallon Weekes – lead vocals, bass, background vocals, production, recording arranger (all tracks); piano (1), guitar (2, 3, 5, 8, 9, 11, 12)

Technical

- Dave Fridmann – production, mixing, recording engineer, recording producer
- Jon Fridmann – assistant recording engineer
- Mike Fridmann – assistant recording engineer
- Greg Calbi – mastering engineer
- Steve Fallone – mastering engineer
- @makenoisemusic – samples (7)
- Ian Mail – samples (7)
- Emiliano Melis – samples (8)

Additional musicians

- Matt Glass – drums (1, 5–11), narration (9)
- Matt Blitzer – guitar (1, 6, 7, 9–12), piano (1)
- Breezy Douglas-Weekes – additional vocals (1)
- Jason Hill – guitar (2–3), horns, percussion (2), keyboards (3)
- Daniel Michael Armbruster – background vocals (3)
- Rick Alvin Schaier – background vocals (3)
- Charlie Brand – vocals (4)
- Stuart Maxfield – guitar (4)
- Lord Birthday – keyboards (4)
- Chad Murphy – background vocals (4)
- Josh Rheault – guitar (6)
- Matt Appleton – horns (7)
- Will Joseph Cook – lead vocals (11), guitar (8, 11)
- SLC (Thought Reform 2022 Tour crowd) – crowd vocals (9)
- Amelie Weekes – yelling (10)
- Knox Weekes – yelling (10)
- Moon Hooch – saxophone (10)
- Noah Bobrow – keyboards (11)

== Charts ==
Weekly chart performance for Gloom Division
Chart (2024)	Peak position
Scottish Albums (Official Charts)	32
US Heatseekers Albums (Billboard)	7
US Top Album Sales (Billboard)	25
US Top Current Album Sales (Billboard)	20
US Indie Store Album Sales (Billboard)	17
US Vinyl Albums (Billboard)	23
