= The Bigger Lights =

American rock band

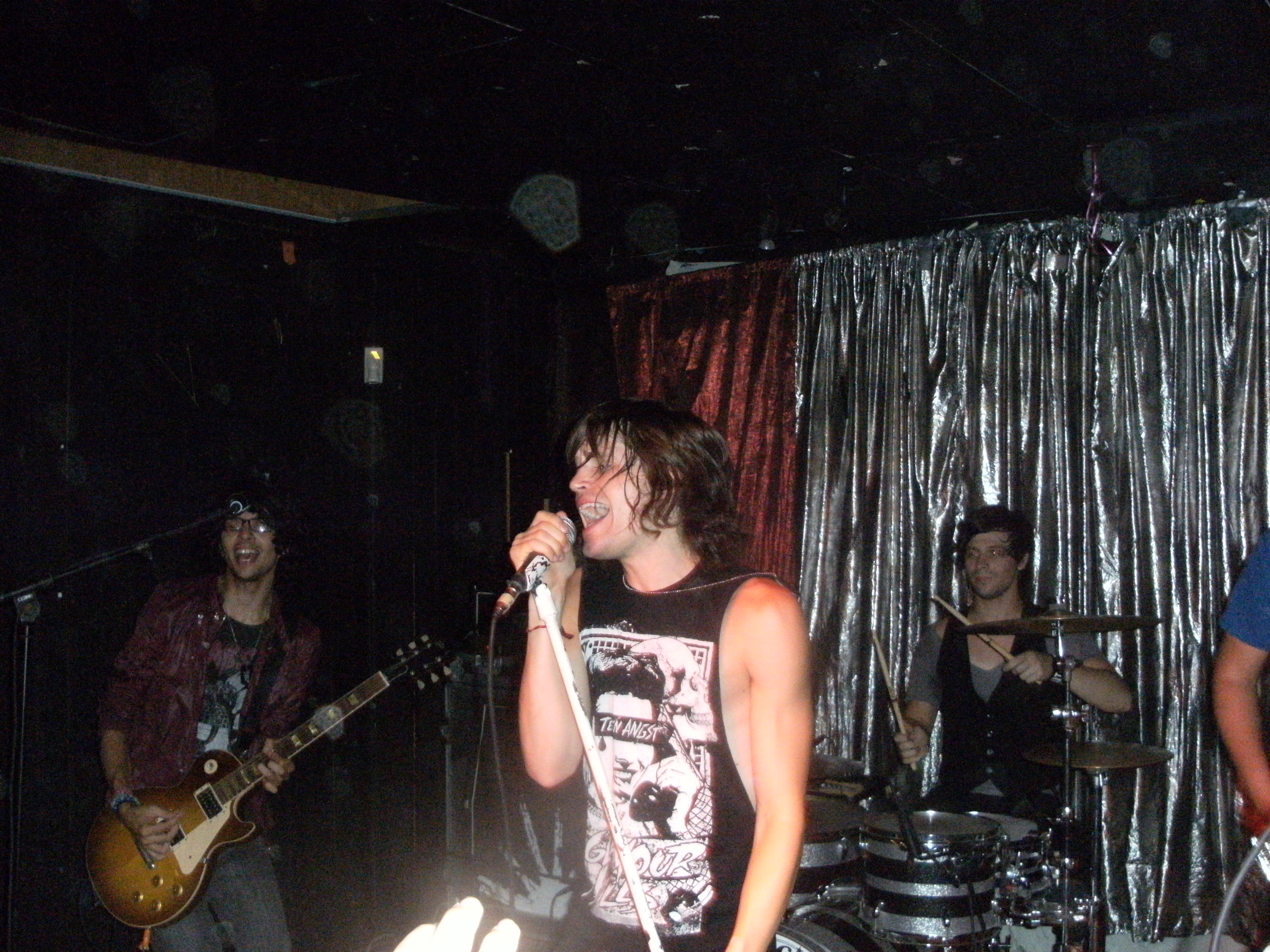
- The Bigger Lights in 2010

Background information
- Origin: Vienna, Virginia, U.S.
- Genres: Alternative rock; emo pop; emo; pop rock; power pop
- Years active: 2007–2011
- Label: Doghouse
- Past members: Christopher "Topher" Talley; John Kendall "JK" Royston; Dan Mineart; Chris McPeters; Mikey Davis; John Paul Holt; Ryan Seaman
- Website: thebiggerlights.net

The Bigger Lights was an American rock band based in Vienna, Virginia. The band signed with Doghouse Records less than one year after forming. Fiction Fever was released on October 7, 2008. Their self-titled debut album was released on March 30, 2010. The Bigger Lights announced on Twitter and Facebook on July 5 that they will be releasing their second full-length album, Battle Hymn, on July 12.

== History ==
"The band started with JK and Dan. They were in another band for five years together and they weren't happy with the way that it was going and they searched for a singer for about seven or eight months and then they ended up seeing me (Topher) at a show and stealing me from my band that I had just started and that's how I got started with them. We went through a couple people as far as drummers and guitarists and stuff and then we ended up, one of our good friends, Aaron Stern who played for a band called matchbook romance actually hooked us up with the guy that's our permanent drummer now, his name's Ryan Seaman and he actually used to drum for a band called I Am Ghost and he did stuff with Jeffree Star, which is silly and awesome I guess but now he's with us full time and we did another tour with this band called Tyler Read it was the Atticus Clothing Tour and we actually meshed really well with this one guitarist named Chris who played for Tyler Read and we thought he was the best guitar player we'd ever seen live and we had the opportunity to bring out a second guitarist. We wanted him hands down. He was at the top of the list so that's how that got set up and we love everyone and we're very very happy with the people we have." -Topher Talley

As of March 2011, The Bigger Lights were listed on Doghouse Records website as Alumni. They released their second album, Battle Hymn, in July 2011.

But in of May 2011 Ryan Seaman left the band. He was part of the band I Don't Know How But They Found Me but was kicked out in 2023 and faced allegations of defrauding his fellow members.

== Band members ==
- Christopher "Topher" Talley – lead vocals (2007–2011)
- John Kendall "JK" Royston – rhythm guitar (2007–2011)
- Dan Mineart – bass guitar (2007–2011)
- Chris McPeters – lead guitar (2009–2011)
- Mikey Davis – drums, percussion (2007–2009)
- John Paul Holt – lead guitar (2007–2008)
- Ryan Seaman – drums, percussion (2009–2011)

== Discography ==
- Third Act Stories EP (2007) – Independent – Produced/Mixed by John Kendall Royston & Daniel Mineart
- Fiction Fever EP (2009) – Doghouse Records – Produced/Mixed by Kenneth Mount & Zack Odom
- The Bigger Lights (2010) – Doghouse Records – Produced by Paul Barber & Mixed by Jeff Juliano
- Battle Hymn (2011) – Independent – Produced/Mixed by John Kendall Royston & Daniel Mineart

== Tours ==
This is a list of tours that The Bigger lights have participated on, or will be participating on; individual concerts are not included.

Tour name	Participating bands	Continent	Participating from – to
The April Nights & Highway Lights Tour	My Favorite Highway, The Bigger Lights	(United States) North America	April 11–21, 2008
The Get Rich Slow Tour	The Scenic, Sparks The Rescue, The Bigger Lights	(United States) North America	October 9–18, 2008
Stereo Bear Presents... Tour	Hey Monday, There For Tomorrow, My Getaway, The Bigger Lights	(United States) North America	December 26–30, 2008
Come See Fight Fair On Tour	Fight Fair, Thieves & Villains, School Boy Humor, The Bigger Lights	(United States) North America	January 25 – February 7, 2009
The Let's Get Happy Tour	Never Shout Never, The Honorary Title, The Scene Aesthetic, The Bigger Lights	(United States) North America	February 26 – March 26, 2009
No Parents, No Rules Tour	The Secret Handshake, The Morning Of, The Dangerous Summer, The Bigger Lights	(United States) North America	May 5–28, 2009
Let's Make a Mess Tour	Hey Monday, This Providence, Stereo Skyline, The Friday Night Boys, The Bigger Lights	(United States) North America	June 10 – July 24, 2009
Cartel/ This Providence Fall Tour 2009	Cartel, This Providence, The Summer Set, The Bigger Lights	(United States) North America	October 22 – November 27, 2009
Once It Hits Your Lips Tour	The Friday Night Boys, Anarbor, The Bigger Lights, The Ready Set	(United States) North America	January 22 – February 13, 2010
'Bout Damn Time Tour	This Providence, Anarbor, The Bigger Lights, Artist Vs. Poet	(United States) North America	March 25 – May 1, 2010
Cute Is What We Aim For Spring Tour 2010	Cute Is What We Aim For, The Friday Night Boys, The Bigger Lights, Down With Webster	(United States) North America	May 11 – June 19, 2010
Warped Tour 2010	Kevin Says Stage	(United States) North America	July 15–17, 2010
Reach For The Sun Tour 2010	The Dangerous Summer, The Morning Of, C!ty L!ghts, The Bigger Lights	(United States) North America	August 10–15, 2010
The Caffeine And Skinny Jeans Tour (First Headlining Tour)	The Bigger Lights, The Graduate, You, Me, And Everyone We Know, Weatherstar	(United States) North America	August 18–29, 2010
The Bigger Lights Winter Tour	The Bigger Lights, The Scenic, For The Foxes	(United States) North America	December 11–19, 2010
