= Better Than Me =

Better Than Me may refer to:

- "Better Than Me", a song by Doja Cat from Hot Pink
- "Better Than Me" (Hinder song)
- "Better Than Me", a song by Metro Station from Savior
- "Better Than Me" (Terry Dexter song)
- "Better Than Me", a song by The Brobecks from Violent Things
- "Better Than Me" (Wonho song)
