= Girls / Girls / Boys =

Single by Panic! at the Disco

from the album Too Weird to Live, Too Rare to Die!
- Released: October 7, 2013
- Genre: New wave; electropop; pop
- Length: 3:26
- Label: Fueled by Ramen
- Songwriters: Brendon Urie; Dallon Weekes
- Producer: Butch Walker

Panic! at the Disco singles chronology
"This Is Gospel" (2013)	"Girls / Girls / Boys" (2013)	"Nicotine" (2014)

Music videos
- "Girls/Girls/Boys" on YouTube; "Girls/Girls/Boys" (Director's Cut) on YouTube

"Girls / Girls / Boys" is a song by American rock band Panic! at the Disco. It was released as the third single from their fourth studio album, Too Weird to Live, Too Rare to Die!, on October 7, 2013. The music video for the song, directed by DJay Brawner, was also released on the day after. It peaked at number 31 on the Billboard Hot Rock Songs chart.

== Writing and composition ==
"Girls / Girls / Boys" was co-written by Brendon Urie and Dallon Weekes. The lyrics have been described as "racy", as the song depicts a love triangle complicated by the female love interest's attraction to women, described by Urie in an interview as being "barsexual" rather than bisexual. In a 2018 interview with Paper, Urie stated the song was a recollection of his first threesome experience.

The bass line of "Girls / Girls / Boys" was written and performed by Weekes, who was compared to Duran Duran bassist, John Taylor.

In an interview with Bass Player in December 2013, Weekes commented on the song's bass line.

"I wrote that on my own, and nobody really wanted to use it for the album. I was actually going to give it to a friend of mine in the band Neon Trees to use. But as we moved on with the writing, I tried to figure out what it was that I liked so much about the song, and I realized it was the bass line. So I took that from it, and we ended up writing a totally different song around it."

== Music video ==
The music video for "Girls / Girls / Boys" was directed by DJay Brawner and released the day after the single. The video was compared to the music video of D'Angelo's, "Untitled (How Does It Feel)", which Urie cited as an inspiration to the video. The video uses the same black background as Untitled, and is also done in a single shot, pulling back to show a nude Urie, and stopping just before showing the pubic region; there has been a rumour that he was wearing very low pants. A director's cut of the music video was released on July 28, 2014. The version is identical to the original, except it includes two women kissing each other and heavily touching Urie near the end of the video.

== Chart performance ==
Chart (2013)	Peak position
US Hot Rock & Alternative Songs (Billboard)	31

== Certifications ==
Region	Certification	Certified units/sales
United Kingdom (BPI)	Silver	200,000^{‡}
United States (RIAA)	Platinum	1,000,000^{‡}
^{‡} Sales+streaming figures based on certification alone.
