= Liang Lawrence =

- Born: 2001/2002
- Origin: Devon, England
- Genres: Soft rock; indie folk; indie pop; alt pop
- Instruments: Vocals; guitar; ukulele
- Years active: 2020–present
- Labels: FrtyFive; The Other Songs

Liang Lawrence (born 2001/2002) is a singer-songwriter based in East London, having started off in Devon. She was nominated for Rising Star at the 2025 Ivor Novello Awards.

== Early life ==
Lawrence is half-English, half-Chinese and lived in eight different countries growing up due to her father's work. These included stints in the Midlands and London, as well as Japan, New Zealand, Malaysia, Kuwait and San Francisco. Lawrence was given piano and violin lessons at a young age, but preferred to teach herself ukulele, songwriting and guitar later on. Lawrence graduated with a degree in biology from the University of Exeter in 2022.

== Career ==
Lawrence made an "impulsive lockdown decision" to self-release her first song "Santa Cruz" in 2020, with production help and support from her sister's husband. She gained an online following uploading videos to TikTok. Her next singles "Turns Out" and "Undercover Martyn" followed in 2022. She was invited to support James Gillespie at his Bristol concert that March.

In August 2023, Lawrence released her debut EP letters to myself. She collaborated with Will Joseph Cook on a track titled "(not) a love song". Lawrence had listened to Cook from a young age, and described the experience of working with him as "insane". She featured on the track "Indefinitely", part of Riley Pearce's album Your Turn Now.

Lawrence's second EP What's Dead and Gone followed the next August, published via The Other Songs. The EP's singles included "Eulogy", "Use Me", "If Only" and "Backseat". Lawrence was contacted by the alt-pop duo Honne, who invited her to join their China tour and feature as a vocalist on their August 2024 single "Say Thar You Will Wait for Me". Lawrence would reunite with the duo for their North America tour. She and Ella Jinks supported Matilda Mann at War Child's Day of the Girl event. Later that year in December, Lawrence released the single "Kiss My Apocalypse". She was nominated for Rising Star at the 2025 Ivor Novello Awards.

== Artistry ==
Growing up, Lawrence listened to Eagles and Genesis through her parents, the former being the first artist Lawrence saw live, as well as The Beatles, Mika, and Oasis. As a teenager, Lawrence became interested in indie and alt rock and bonded with a friend over it, discovering the likes of Two Door Cinema Club, Phoenix, Bombay Bicycle Club, Cage the Elephant, The Kooks, and The Snuts. Lawrence also cites Dodie Clark as an early songwriting inspiration, and drew upon the aforementioned Gallaghers and the Beatles as well as Blossoms when approaching songwriting professionally.

Lawrence has further named The Japanese House, Joni Mitchell, Beabadoobee, Clairo, Spacey Jane, and Holly Humberstone as sonic and writing influences. Other artists she has praised include Wunderhorse, Flyte, and The Cardigans.

== Discography ==
=== EPs ===
- letters to myself (2023)
- What's Dead and Gone (2024)
- It’s A Funny Thing (2025)

=== Singles ===
- "Santa Cruz" (2020)
- "Turns Out" (2022)
- "Undercover Martyn" (2022)
- "stuck" (2023)
- "unposted letters" (2023)
- "Eulogy" (2024)
- "Use Me" (2024)
- "If Only" (2024)
- "Backseat" (2024)
- "Out Loud" (2024)
- "Kiss My Apocalypse" (2024)
- "A Day Off in Margaritaville" (2025)
- "Endless Sundays" (2026)
- "Leave Me There" (2026)

=== Collaborations ===
- "(not) a love song" (2023), with Will Joseph Cook
- "Indefinitely" (2024), with Riley Pearce
- "Say That You Will Wait for Me" (2024), Honne featuring Liang Lawrence
- "COMING HOME 2 U" (2025), Jo Hill featuring Liang Lawrence
- "Favourite Idiot" (2026), Orla Gartland featuring Liang Lawrence
