= Miss Jackson =

Single by Panic! at the Disco featuring Lolo

from the album Too Weird to Live, Too Rare to Die!
- Released: July 15, 2013
- Recorded: November 2012 – March 2013
- Genre: Pop rock, Arena Rock
- Length: 3:12
- Label: Fueled by Ramen
- Songwriters: Brendon Urie; Lauren Pritchard; Jake Sinclair; Amir Jerome Salem; Alex Goose
- Producer: Butch Walker

Panic! at the Disco singles chronology
"Let's Kill Tonight" (2011)	"Miss Jackson" (2013)	"This Is Gospel" (2013)

Music video
- "Miss Jackson" on YouTube

"Miss Jackson" is a song by American rock band Panic! at the Disco, released on July 15, 2013, as the first single for the band's fourth studio album, Too Weird to Live, Too Rare to Die! (2013). The song features vocals from Lolo. A music video directed by Jordan Bahat accompanied the song's announcement as well as the album's title and release date, and headlining tour dates. It was the band's first release since 2011, and the first release to feature Dallon Weekes on bass. The Butch Walker-produced track has been described as "darkly anthemic". It reached the top 10 on iTunes on its release and sold 56,000 digital downloads in its first week to debut at No. 68 on the Billboard Hot 100 and No. 27 on Digital Songs. It also became Panic! at the Disco's first top ten hit on the Alternative Songs chart since "Nine in the Afternoon" in 2008. In January 2015, it was certified Gold by the RIAA.

== Writing and composition ==
"Miss Jackson" is titled after Janet Jackson and refers to her hit "Nasty" in the line "Miss Jackson, are you nasty?" during its chorus. "Nasty" is notorious for the line "My first name ain't baby, it's Janet - Miss Jackson if you're nasty", which became widely used in pop culture in various forms and is an iconic catchphrase. The song is one of Jackson's signature hits and was released as the second single from her breakthrough album Control.

The song was originally titled "Bad Apple" as it contained a sample from Fiona Apple's tune "Every Single Night", but when the band played it for her she denied them publishing rights to use her melody. Lead singer Brendon Urie confessed to being 'pretty pissed' by the refusal, but also admitted he prefers the band's new approach to the song. Urie called Apple a "bitch" over her decision, which Apple later explained was because another singer had also recently sampled the song.

In an interview with MTV, the lead singer Brendon Urie, says the lyrics were based on personal experiences:

"'Miss Jackson' is about something that actually happened to me when I was younger. I hadn't really talked about it, and I felt that if I didn't, I would keep thinking about it, it would drive me crazy. When I was younger, I would mess around; I'd sleep with one girl one night, sleep with her friend the next night, and not care about how they felt, or how I made them feel. And then it happened to me and I realized 'Wow, that's what that feels like?'"

== Release ==
Regarding the band's decision to release "Miss Jackson" as the lead single from their fourth studio album, Too Weird to Live, Too Rare to Die!, vocalist and guitarist Brendon Urie stated, "Every song on the album is pretty different from one another, but there are a lot of the sounds of the other songs are kind of mixed together in ["Miss Jackson"]. There are songs that range from something personal to something fictitious to a song about where I grew up in Vegas. This really sums up the vibe of the record, of this party record that we’re excited about." The song impacted alternative radio on July 30, 2013, and released to mainstream radio on November 11, 2013.

== Music video ==
The music video for "Miss Jackson" was directed by Jordan Bahat and released on Fueled by Ramen's YouTube channel. It features American actress Katrina Bowden, who is known for playing Cerie on the NBC sitcom 30 Rock. The motel scene was filmed in Barstow, California. The video features Urie (as the male lead) first in his house, while a burning tire is rolling. Urie smokes cigarettes as he walks outside, where he finds the leader of Barstow (Miss Jackson) and she reveals that she also smokes. The two trade breaths as other people watch. Finally Miss Jackson attempts suicide: she tries to convince Urie to kill her and gives him a knife. While no violence is shown on-screen, the woman’s head is shown bleeding and smoking. The crowd then celebrates Urie as their new leader.

== Chart performance ==
=== Weekly charts ===
Chart (2013)	Peak position
Canada (Canadian Hot 100)	73
UK Singles (Official Charts)	61
UK Rock & Metal (Official Charts)	2
US Billboard Hot 100	68
US Hot Rock Songs (Billboard)	11
US Rock Airplay (Billboard)	18
US Alternative Songs (Billboard)	7

=== Year-end charts ===
Chart (2013)	Position
US Hot Rock Songs (Billboard)	34
US Alternative Songs (Billboard)	39

Chart (2014)	Position
US Hot Rock Songs (Billboard)	83

== Certifications ==
Region	Certification	Certified units/sales
Canada (Music Canada)	Gold	40,000^{‡}
United Kingdom (BPI)	Silver	200,000^{‡}
United States (RIAA)	2× Platinum	2,000,000^{‡}
^{‡} Sales+streaming figures based on certification alone.

== Release history ==
Release dates and formats for "Miss Jackson"
Region	Date	Format	Label(s)	Ref.
United States	November 5, 2013	Mainstream airplay	Fueled By Ramen	
