= I Am Ghost =

American band

- Origin: Long Beach, California, United States
- Genres: Post-hardcore, gothic rock, emo
- Years active: 2004–2010, 2016
- Label: Epitaph
- Past members: Steven Juliano; Tim Rosales III; Ron Ficarro; Justin McCarthy; Chad Kulengosky; Brian Telestai; Kerith Telestai; Ryan Seaman; Gabriel Iraheta; Victor Angel Camarena

I Am Ghost was an American post-hardcore band from Long Beach, California, United States, conceived of and founded by Steven Juliano in 2004. They were signed to Epitaph Records from 2005 to 2010, before splitting up in July 2010. They briefly reunited on April 28, 2016.

== History ==
Singer Steve Juliano utilized his knowledge of MySpace to attract prospective members to I Am Ghost and formed the original members that included lead guitarist Timoteo Rosales III; rhythm guitarist Gabe Iraheta; violinist Kerith Telestai and her husband, bassist/keyboardist Brian Telestai, and drummer, Victor Camarena. Before the band began touring, Camarena was replaced by Ryan Seaman.

After signing to Epitaph Records, the band's self-recorded and self-released EP entitled We Are Always Searching was remastered and re-released by the label. Epitaph issued the band's first album, Lovers' Requiem, on October 10, 2006. Juliano explains, "It's essentially a rock opera but for hardcore or Goth kids."

I Am Ghost toured with Biffy Clyro, TheAUDITION and The Bronx on the Kerrang! Tour 2007, the Epitaph Tour 2007 with Escape the Fate, The Matches, and The Higher, the Take Action Tour in 2006, and played on Warped Tour 2006 and Warped Tour 2007 in support of their first album.

Band violinist/vocalist Kerith Telestai released an official statement on June 29, 2007, stating that she would be unable to continue touring and would be leaving I Am Ghost for health reasons after being hospitalized in both Spokane, WA and Denver, CO on their tour with The Chariot. A few days after Kerith's departure, her husband, Brian Telestai, announced that he too would be leaving the band after the 2007 Warped Tour and their tour with Aiden. According to Juliano, there was a conflict among the members about how much they would tour and what was sustainable for the health of their members. The band decided to prioritize their touring schedule and the Telestai's left as a result. During the 2007 Warped Tour, bassist/vocalist Ron Ficarro was invited to join the band and replace Brian Telestai.

The band's second album, Those We Leave Behind, was released on October 7, 2008. Their second album was met with mixed reviews. Some people felt their new distilled sound was meaner, more aggressive, and only a slight departure from their previous sound, while a lot of their fan base still expected to hear the classic elements of violin and choral voices that had become part of their signature sound. "[Their new sound] has become a big debate between I Am Ghost fans" "[Kerith] helped provide life to the band, and she's sorely missed. The guitar work of Gabe Iraheta and the drumming of Ryan Seaman are also missed; it's evident that their musicianship was much better than those who have replaced them". Some have speculated that Juliano wrote the song "Smile of A Jesus Freak" specifically about Kerith Telestai. Fan reviews were mixed: "[Their music is] less epic than before, which I felt had been my favorite appeal to them, but their style and sound of We Are Always Searching is defiantly there. Their key choruses and pounding breakdowns and bridges remain untampered, and the drumming is still right on track." Another review stated, "They might be one of the few remaining screamo bands who've yet to change their sound or move onto greener pastures. It's both commendable and stupid in some aspects."

I Am Ghost toured Europe and the United States in support of the album, most recently supporting The Birthday Massacre.

On July 17, 2010 Juliano announced the band's break-up. He stated that the band had "...matured and grown up."

== Members ==
Final line-up

- Steven Juliano – lead vocals, programming (2004–2010, 2016)
- Tim Rosales III – lead guitar (2004–2010, 2016)
- Chad Kulengosky – rhythm guitar, backing vocals (2007–2010, 2016)
- Justin McCarthy – drums, percussion (2007–2010, 2016)
- Ron Ficarro – bass, backing vocals (2007–2010, 2016)

Former members

- Brian Telestai – bass, guitars, keyboard, programming, backing vocals, choral vocals (2004–2007)
- Kerith Telestai – violin, strings, backing vocals, choral vocals (2004–2007)
- Victor Angel Camarena – drums (2004–2005)
- Ryan Seaman – drums (2005–2007)
- Gabe Iraheta – rhythm guitar, programming (2004–2007)

== Discography ==
Studio albums

- Lovers' Requiem (2006)
- Those We Leave Behind (2008)

EPs

- We Are Always Searching (2005)

Live albums

- Live in Orange County (2009)

== Videography ==
- "Civil War and Isolation Thirst" (2005)
- "Our Friend Lazarus Sleeps" (2006)
- "Saddest Story Never Told" (2009)

== Post band ==
As of September 2010, Steve Juliano (vocals) formed a new band with Guitarist Ty Oliver "Requiem for the Dead". The band released its debut album, "Always and Forever" September 2, 2011. In 2014 Steve Juliano announced on his Facebook page that the band's name would be shortened to "Requiem".

As of April 20, 2011, Tim Rosales III(guitar) formed a group called "GHZT:DGTL", which consists of collaborations with artists he met around the world including Ace Midas, Chamber of Echoes, Soy Suspenso, Llaves de la Calle and many more.

As of December 2011, founding member Victor Angel Camarena (drums) plays for the djent band Emissary. The EP entitled "Sentinels" was released in 2012.

As of May 2011, Ryan Seaman (drums) was playing drums for Falling In Reverse But departed early 2017. He since started a band with former Panic! At the Disco member Dallon Weeks called I Dont Know How but They Found Me, but was fired in 2023.

On January 15, 2012, Ron Ficarro (bass) was playing bass for Falling In Reverse, after the departure of their previous bassist Mika Horiuchi. Ron has since left Falling In Reverse and now plays for Camryn.

As of August 2013, Kerith Telestai is teaching 5th grade in the Meridian, Idaho school district. Brian & Kerith Telestai founded Idaho Rising Stars Performing Arts Camps in 2010 to teach kids the basics of singing, acting, and dancing.

Justin McCarthy now plays drums for XO Stereo.
