= WNYO (FM) =

- Oswego, New York; United States
- Broadcast area: Oswego County, New York
- Frequency: 88.9 MHz
- Branding: WNYO 88.9 FM Oswego, NY

Programming
- Language: English
- Format: College radio
- Affiliations: NPR; Public Radio Exchange

Ownership
- Owner: State University of New York at Oswego; (State University of New York)

History
- First air date: November 1, 1968
- Former call signs: WOCR, WOZZ, WOSR
- Former frequencies: 640AM

Technical information
- Licensing authority: FCC
- Facility ID: 63122
- Class: A
- ERP: 100 watts
- HAAT: 3 meters (9.8 ft)
- Transmitter coordinates: 43.4520°N 76.5441°W

Links
- Public license information: Public file; LMS
- Webcast: www.internet-radio.com/station/wnyo/
- Website: www.wnyo889.org

WNYO is a college radio station broadcasting from the State University of New York at Oswego in the City of Oswego, New York. It is a 24/7 radio station operated and managed by the students of SUNY Oswego. Broadcasting from the SUNY Oswego Marano Campus Center, WNYO broadcasts primarily alternative and hip-hop music throughout the day, as well as a fair amount of talk and sports-oriented programming.

WNYO also runs news segments, conducts interviews with artists, and plays syndicated NPR programs when students do not have shows. It broadcasts Oswego State Lakers sporting events live for the City of Oswego and on the internet.

== History ==
=== 1960s ===
In 1967 a group of Seneca Hall students begin broadcasting music via 1/2 watt transmitter. Dubbed "WSEH", the signal reaches the students in some, but not all of the floors in the dorm. The staff consisted of John Long, John Krauss and Randy Risk. John Long's record player served as the station's only turntable. The students responsible for WSEH organized the Oswego State Broadcasting Service and proposed to the Student Association for a commercial college radio station which would reach the entire campus, with a starting budget of $8500. The Student Association authorized an initial expenditure of $6000, the balance to be made up by the sale of advertising and profits of station-sponsored events.

OSBS obtained a space dubbed by many as "The Closet" which was located Room 211 of the new Hewitt Union. The Executive Board was hoping to obtain a license from the Federal Communications Commission (FCC) for an FM radio station in 1968, but in the interim transmitted their signal to the dorms via telephone lines and carrier current transmitters which utilize a building's electrical wiring as a broadcast antenna. The system, as devised, required no FCC license.

The station would be identified by the call letters "WOCR", signifying Oswego College Radio.

On November 1, 1968, at 5 p.m., WOCR signed on. The station affiliated with the Intercollegiate Broadcasting System. World and national news and information programming came via ABC's American Contemporary Network. As a 24-hour service, the signal of WHFM in Rochester was simulcast over the station from midnight until 6 a.m.

In 1969 the station moved into more spacious quarters in rooms 201 and 224 of the Hewitt Union. Station members construct a master control and production studios. Night Shift programming replaces WHFM during the overnight hours as live local announcers would go on-air.

=== 1970s ===
In 1971 WOCR becomes available on TelePrompTer cable channel 6 in the city of Oswego, doubling the audience and improving opportunities for advertising sales.

In 1974 a memorandum from college president James Purdue to Student Association President is leaked to WOCR. "Steps will be taken next year to prevent the student campus radio station from soliciting paid advertising. This they have done in the past without permission, and the result has been an over solicitation of people in the community for support of an unauthorized campus activity... I don't think the radio station is a good radio station and this bothers me because it does get out into the community." Additionally, the Student Association zeroes out the requested $10,000 budget request from WOCR, the Treasurer stating that President Purdue would veto the entire S.A. budget if WOCR was allocated funds before he had seen and approved the proposed WOCR programming structure for 1974-75. After Purdue has reviewed the station's plans for 1974-75 operation plans, the S.A. approves a $7500 austerity budget. The station was ordered off cable and the ability to sell advertising to the Oswego community was banned. At the time of the memo, annual advertising revenue was currently approximately $10,000. In 1977 acting College President Virginia Radley and SUNY approve a plan, allowing WOCR to once again sell commercial advertising to the Oswego community.

=== 1990s ===
In 1991, the State University of New York system applied for a construction permit for a new FM station at 88.9 MHz. The station received the call sign WNYO on December 13, 1991; it signs on April 29, 1992, serving as a successor to the carrier current station (which, in addition to WSEH and WOCR, had subsequently gone by WOZZ and WOSR).

=== 21st century ===
In 2011 WNYO moved from Simian Automation System to ENCO's DAD automation system. In 2018, WNYO renovated its studio in the Marano Campus Center. This renovation included a new main studio, two production studios, and keycard, 24-hour access door, making it a world class station in terms of equipment. WNYO began airing WRVO's Take Care on Sunday mornings and has started uploading podcasts to YouTube at this time as well.

In 2021 WNYO transitioned from ENCO's DAD automation system to WideOrbit's Automation for Radio.

== The Ozzie awards ==
The Ozzies, is an annual award show put on by the SUNY Oswego Department of Communication Studies in the spring semester. The executive board of the three media organizations (WNYO, WTOP-TV, and The Oswegonian) creates the categories and then nominates shows and members. The board of professors then selects the winners.

== National awards and nominations ==
Year	Award	Category	Result	Citation
2019	CBI National Student Production Awards	Best Sports Play-By-Play (Audio)	Won	
2020	BEA Festival of Media Arts; Student Audio Competition	Best Comedy or Drama	Nominated	
2020	NYSBA Awards for Excellence in Broadcasting; College Radio Division	Outstanding Radio Show	Won	
2020	NYSBA Awards for Excellence in Broadcasting; College Radio Division	Outstanding Social Media Personality	Won	
2020	NYSBA Awards for Excellence in Broadcasting; College Radio Division	Outstanding Classroom Digital Project	Won	
2021	NYSBA Awards for Excellence in Broadcasting; College Radio Division	Outstanding Radio Show	Won	
2021	NYSBA Awards for Excellence in Broadcasting; College Radio Division	Outstanding Social Media Personality	Won	
2022	NYSBA Awards for Excellence in Broadcasting; College Radio Division	Outstanding Sports Coverage	Won	
2022	NYSBA Awards for Excellence in Broadcasting; College Radio Division	Outstanding Editorial/Commentary	Won	

== Notable alumni ==
- Steve Levy '87, sports journalist
- Linda Cohn '81, sports journalist
- Al Roker '76, weather forecaster, journalist, and television personality
