= Nicotine (song) =

2014 single by Panic! at the Disco

Single by Panic! at the Disco

from the album Too Weird to Live, Too Rare to Die!
- Released: May 6, 2014
- Length: 3:06
- Label: Fueled by Ramen
- Songwriters: Brendon Urie; Dallon Weekes
- Producer: Butch Walker

Panic! at the Disco singles chronology
"Girls / Girls / Boys" (2013)	"Nicotine" (2014)	"Hallelujah" (2015)

Music video
- "Nicotine" on YouTube

"Nicotine" is a song by American rock band Panic! at the Disco. It appears as the fifth song on the band's fourth studio album, Too Weird to Live, Too Rare to Die!, which released on October 8, 2013. A music video for the song released in early 2014, with "Nicotine" becoming the album's fourth single on May 6, 2014, alongside a promotional EP. It was the final single to feature members Dallon Weekes and Spencer Smith, and the final Panic! at the Disco song to be released as a band, with further releases being made as Urie's solo project.

== Background and composition ==
While in New York, Panic! at the Disco's frontman Brendon Urie began writing "Nicotine" with Amir Salem and band member Dallon Weekes. During this time, Urie was quitting smoking and Salem was going through relationship issues, so they merged the two concepts and wrote about a girl metaphorically being a cigarette.

"Nicotine" personifies addiction, lyrically describing continuing to be in a relationship despite knowing the negative consequences that will follow. In an interview with Rolling Stone, Urie stated "it's that drunk text you know you shouldn’t answer. It feels good in the moment but the next day, you know, you get that shame hangover". This is instrumentally backed by house-style drums with "catchy hooks and powerful guitar riffs".

== Music video ==
A music video for "Nicotine", directed by Kai Regan, was released on February 28, 2014. The video alternates between black-and-white shots of Urie walking and driving through snow and Urie sulking in a hotel room. On YouTube, the song's video has received over 21 million views.

== Track listing ==
Nicotine EP

1. "Nicotine" – 3:06
2. "Can't Fight Against the Youth" – 2:44
3. "All the Boys" – 3:12
4. "Nicotine" (Instrumental) – 3:06

== Personnel ==
Credits adapted from Tidal.

Panic! at the Disco

- Brendon Urie – lead vocals, guitar, keyboards, piano, synthesizer, programming, composer
- Dallon Weekes – bass guitar, backing vocals, composer
- Spencer Smith – drums, percussion

Production

- Butch Walker – producer
- Jake Sinclair – audio engineer, mixing engineer, recording engineer
- Amir Salem – audio engineer, recording engineer
- Todd Stopera – audio engineer, recording engineer
- Chris Barrett – assistant recording engineer
- Ted Jensen – mastering engineer
- Jonathan Allen – additional engineer
- Julian Leaper – concert master
- Rob Mathes – conductor

Additional musicians

- Butch Walker – additional guitar, backing vocals
- Dave Daniels – cello
- Rob Mathes – strings
- Peter Lale – viola
- Emlyn Singleton – violin
- Azeem – composer

== Certifications ==
Certifications for "Nicotine"
Region	Certification	Certified units/sales
United States (RIAA)	Platinum	1,000,000^{‡}
^{‡} Sales+streaming figures based on certification alone.
