= Those We Leave Behind =

Studio album by I Am Ghost
- Released: October 7, 2008
- Recorded: Valencia Recording, Fell's Point, Maryland
- Genre: Post-hardcore, screamo, gothic rock
- Length: 48:12
- Label: Epitaph
- Producer: Paul Leavitt

I Am Ghost chronology
Lovers' Requiem (2006)	Those We Leave Behind (2008)

Professional ratings
Review scores
Source	Rating
Alt Press	link
Kerrang!	4/5 stars
Rocklouder	link
Rockmidgets.com	link

Those We Leave Behind is the second and final studio album by post-hardcore band I Am Ghost, and was released on October 7, 2008. The sound of the album is considerably different: after the departure of the band's female vocalist/violinist Kerith Telestai, I Am Ghost recorded more melodic, yet lyrically darker songs, with a stronger indication towards punk.

== Album information ==
I Am Ghost parted ways with their band members, Brian Telestai (bass, keys, vocals) and his wife Kerith Telestai (violin, vocals) parted ways with I Am Ghost after health problems arose for Kerith on their national tour with The Chariot. Kerith said goodbye during a show at warped tour, while Brian left after the West Coast Revival tour with Aiden. After the two members left, Ron Ficarro joined filling in for bass, and no replacement was made for Kerith Telestai.

Lead singer Steve Juliano discussed the new direction of the album:

We went through a spiritual journey these past six months. Call it a band cliché, but it doesn't really bother me to say that. I sat in my room with these songs and really just let everything out. It was a cleansing of all the bad thoughts and ideals that had stuck in my head for almost three years. The past will always haunt you, and I know this. For awhile [sic] I was a very angry pissed off guy who hated a lot of people. This new album made me think. Why was I letting other people take control of my life? This album saved my life more than once. I don't know where I would be without these songs, the new members of this band and my family. Lyrically this is the darkest album I have ever written. Musically it's the most beautiful music we have ever done. We were not afraid any more. I am not afraid anymore. We wrote this entire album with our blood, sweat and tears. I wrote this album so I could stay alive and continue living again...

— Steven Juliano,

Juliano wrote all of the lyrics on Those We Leave Behind. The album's music was primarily written by bassist Ron Ficarro with additional compositions from guitarist Tim Rosales III. On August 12, I Am Ghost uploaded "Bone Garden" onto their Myspace.

== Track listing ==
No.	Title	Length
1.	"Intro: We Dance with Monsters"	0:45
2.	"Don't Wake Up"	4:46
3.	"Those We Leave Behind"	4:02
4.	"Buried Way Too Shallow"	3:51
5.	"Bone Garden"	4:16
6.	"Saddest Story Never Told"	3:51
7.	"Smile of a Jesus Freak"	3:39
8.	"So, I Guess This Is Goodbye"	3:47
9.	"Interlude: Remember This Face, Baby"	1:29
10.	"Burn the Bodies to the Ground"	3:42
11.	"Rock n' Roll High School Murder"	2:55
12.	"Make Me Believe This Is Real"	4:07
13.	"They Always Come Back"	3:35
14.	"Set Me Free"	3:34

== Personnel ==
Band

- Steven Juliano
- Ron Ficarro
- Tim Rosales III
- Justin McCarthy

Additional musicians

- Jon LaLopa – additional guitar
- Sharon Wang – violins (tracks: 1, 2, 4, 6, 10, 13)
- Justin Chapman – cello (tracks: 1, 2, 4, 6, 10, 13)
- Alison Murphy – reading (track: 1)
- Cody Leavitt – additional vocals (tracks: 2, 8)
- Ron Ficarro – orchestra arrangement

Artwork and design

- Nick Pritchard – art director, designer
- Bryan Sheffield – photography

Production and technical

- Paul Leavitt – producer, recording, engineer, mixing
- Cory Gable – additional Pro Tools engineer
- Michael Fossenkemper – mastering

== Chart positions ==
Chart	Peak position
US Top Heatseekers	12
