= My Favorite Highway =

American pop rock band

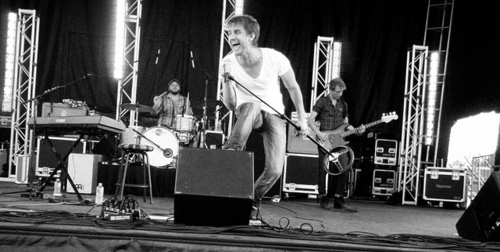

Background information
- Origin: Fairfax, Virginia, U.S.
- Genre: Pop rock
- Years active: 2004–2010
- Label: Virgin
- Past members: Dave Cook; Will Cook; Pat Jenkins; Bobby Morgenthaler

My Favorite Highway was an American pop rock band, originally formed in 2004 by cousins Dave Cook and Will Cook in the city of Fairfax, Virginia. While still unsigned the band recorded and released two EPs and one full-length album, selling over 100,000 digital singles independently before signing a major label record deal with Virgin Records in 2008. In 2009, Virgin Records re-released the band's record, "How To Call A Bluff", with the addition of two new songs, "Go" and Dreamer". Their song, "Say So", received moderate radio airplay throughout the U.S. during 2009. Many of the band's songs have appeared on popular TV shows such as MTV's The Hills, Laguna Beach, The City and The CW's Fly Girls and 90210. They played at The Bamboozle in 2009 and 2010 and have toured with artists such as The Cab, Hellogoodbye, Fun, Forever The Sickest Kids, The Rocket Summer, and Kelly Clarkson, among others. My Favorite Highway disbanded in September 2010.

On Tuesday, August 10th 2026, lead singer Dave Cook took to his Instagram account to announce that My Favorite Highway is playing a 20 Year Reunion Show after almost 16 years since last playing on stage as a band. They will be performing Saturday, October 24th at Jammin' Java Music Venue in Vienna, Virginia. "We’ll be playing all of our favorite songs from How To Call A Bluff, Anywhere But Here, and maybe even something new…", Cook writes of the event.

== Members ==
- Dave Cook - Vocals, Guitar, Piano
- Will Cook - Bass
- Pat Jenkins - Guitar, Backup Vocals
- Bobby Morgenthaler - Drums
- Chris Loizou - Drums
- Andrew Goldstein - Guitar
- Brian Morgenthaler - Guitar
- Ryan Seaman - Drums (touring only)

== Discography ==
- The Pre-Release (Independent - August 30, 2005)
- Anywhere But Here (Independent - November 14, 2006)
- How to Call a Bluff (Independent - July 13, 2008)
- How to Call a Bluff (Virgin Records - May 5, 2009)
