= Will Joseph Cook =

British singer-songwriter

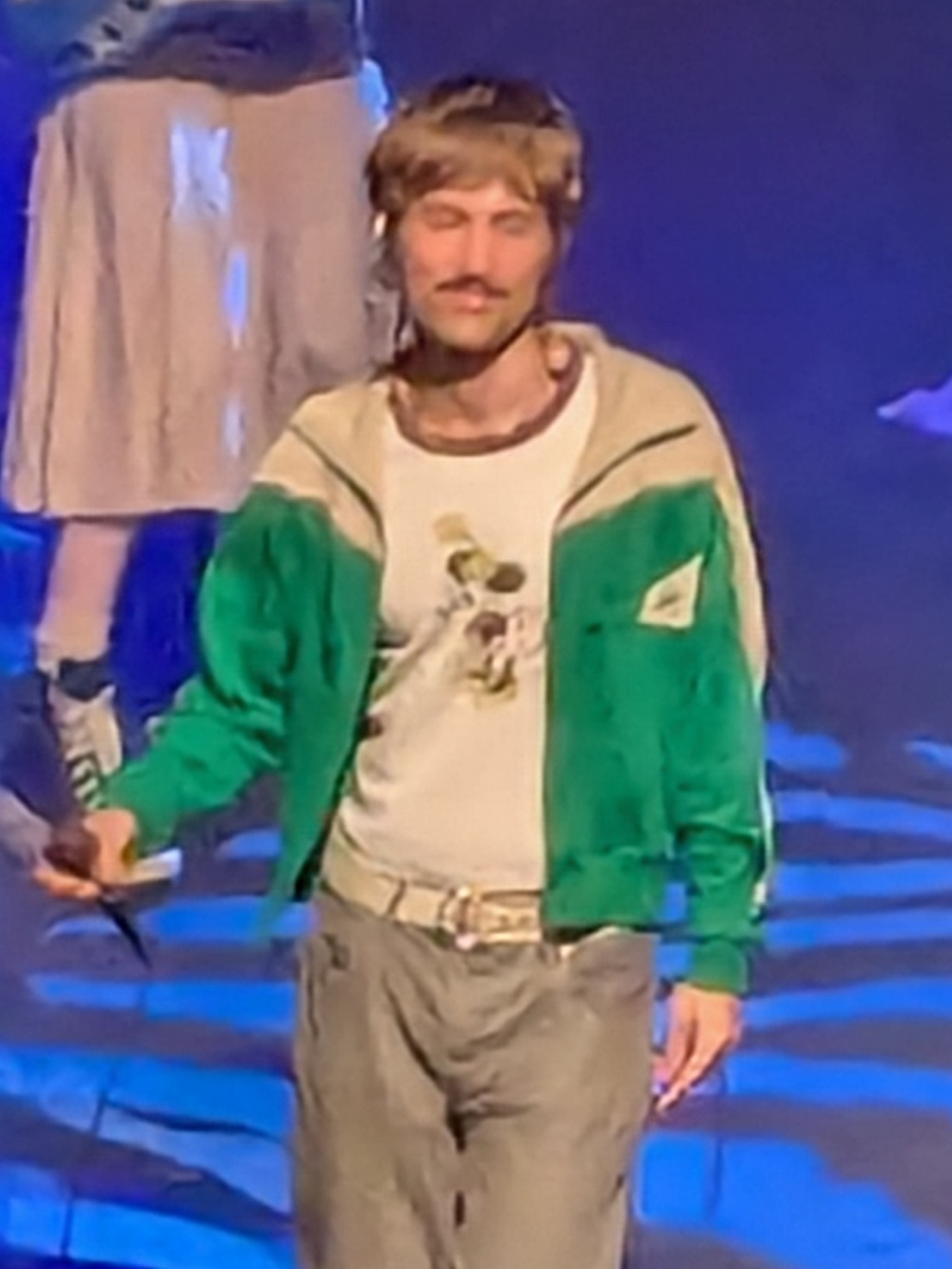
- Cook with I Dont Know How but They Found Me in 2024

Background information
- Born: 21 May 1998 (age 28)
- Origin: Tunbridge Wells, Kent, United Kingdom
- Genres: Indie pop; Dance pop
- Occupations: Singer; Songwriter; Producer
- Years active: 2015– present
- Labels: Atlantic Records; Bad Hotel; Duly Noted Records

Will Joseph Cook is an English singer-songwriter based in London. Specializing in guitar-based indie pop music, he is best known for his viral songs "Be Around Me" and "Girls Like Me".

== Early life ==
Cook was born and raised in Tunbridge Wells, Kent. He grew up in a creative household and often attended live music shows. He was introduced by his father to music acts such as MGMT, Vampire Weekend, Empire of the Sun and Darwin Deez. Cook acknowledges these artists as later having influenced his music.

== Career ==
In 2015, Will Joseph Cook released two extended plays, You Jump, I Run and Proof Enough. The artist then released the single "Girls Like Me" on February 12, 2016. It was his first hit, and he was signed to Atlantic Records immediately at the age of 17. Under the label, he released his debut album Sweet Dreamer in 2018 to critical praise.

Cook then took a break for two years before returning with the album Something to Feel Good About in 2020, which was released on his own label, Bad Hotel. The independently released album was produced in Los Angeles and London. The track "Be Around Me" from the album became a viral hit on TikTok when its bridge was used in thousands of TikTok clips. It is his biggest hit to date.

This was followed by his third studio album, Every Single Thing in 2022, and was also an independent release. It featured a remake of the viral "Be Around Me", and featured American singer Chloe Moriondo.

In 2023, Cook released the mixtape Novella. Novella was marked by a European tour, with him performing in cities including London, Manchester, Amsterdam and Paris.

The artist has collaborated with notable indie artists such as Deaton Chris Anthony, Tessa Violet and Chloe Moriondo, as well as Liang Lawrence, Artemas and Jean Tonique. In 2022, Cook opened for Declan McKenna at Elysée Montmartre, Paris.

His work has been widely covered by magazines and indie music websites such as Clash, The Line of Best Fit, The Guardian, DIY, Dork and Notion.

He is now performing as one half of Aki Oke.

== Discography ==
=== Studio albums ===
List of albums with selected details
Title	Album details
Sweet Dreamer	Released: April 14, 2017; Label: Atlantic Records; Format: LP, CD, download, streaming
Something to Feel Good About	Released: November 27, 2020; Label: Bad Hotel; Format: LP, download, streaming
Every Single Thing	Released: June 12, 2022; Label: Bad Hotel; Format: LP, Cassette, download, streaming

=== Extended plays ===
List of extended plays/mixtapes with selected details
Title	Extended play details
You Jump, I Run	Released: April 21, 2015; Label: Duly Noted Records; Format: Download, streaming
Proof Enough	Released: August 11, 2015; Label: Atlantic Records; Format: Download, streaming
Novella	Released: October 20, 2023; Label: Bad Hotel; Format: Download, streaming
