= Lovers' Requiem =

Studio album by I Am Ghost
- Released: October 10, 2006
- Recorded: Bavon, VA @ Studio Barbarossa
- Genre: Post-hardcore, screamo, gothic rock, emo
- Length: 45:04
- Label: Epitaph
- Producer: Michael "Elvis" Baskette

I Am Ghost chronology
We Are Always Searching (2005)	Lovers' Requiem (2006)	Those We Leave Behind (2008)

Singles from Lovers' Requiem
- 1. "Our Friend Lazarus Sleeps" Released: 2006; 2. "Killers Like Candy" Released: 2007

Professional ratings
Review scores
Source	Rating
Kerrang!	4/5 stars
Allmusic	3.5/5 stars
HM Magazine	3/5 stars

Lovers' Requiem is the debut album by the rock band I Am Ghost. It was released on October 10, 2006 by Epitaph Records, and is the band's first full-length album. It is a concept album of "a love story between angels and demons, heaven and hell, good and evil."

== Track listing ==
All tracks are written by I Am Ghost.

No.	Title	Length
1.	"Crossing the River Styx"	1:56
2.	"Our Friend Lazarus Sleeps"	2:55
3.	"Killer Likes Candy"	3:33
4.	"Dark Carnival of the Immaculate"	3:16
5.	"Pretty People Never Lie, Vampires Never Really Die"	4:33
6.	"Of Masques and Martyrs"	3:38
7.	"Lovers' Requiem"	4:15
8.	"We Are Always Searching"	3:29
9.	"The Ship of Pills and Needed Things"	3:42
10.	"The Denouement"	3:19
11.	"This Is Home"	4:26
12.	"Beyond the Hourglass"	5:57
13.	"The Malediction" (Australian and Japanese bonus track)	3:47

== Chart positions ==
Year	Chart	Peak position
2008	Top Independent	39
2008	Top Heatseekers	39

== Credits ==
- Michael "Elvis" Baskette - producer & mixing
- Dave Holderedge - engineer & mixing
- Jef Moll - digital editing
- Steve Juliano - Lead Vocals, Screams, and Gang Vocals
- Kerith Telestai - Vocals, Violin, Strings, Choral Vocals, Operatic Solo on "The River Styx", Orchestral and Choral Composition
- Tim Rosales III - Lead Guitar and Gang Vocals
- Gabe Iraheta - Rhythm Guitar, Programming, and Gang Vocals
- Brian Telestai - Bass, Vocals, Piano, Keyboard, Choral Vocals, Operatic Solo on "The River Styx", Orchestral and Choral Composition
- Ryan Seaman - Drums and Gang Vocals

== Making of the album ==
- Studio Diary Part 1 (Teaser)
- Studio Diary Part 2 (Production)
- Studio Diary Part 3 (Bass)
- Studio Diary Part 4 (Guitar)
- Studio Diary Part 5 (Violin)
- Studio Diary Part 6 (Vocals)
