= Christmas Drag =

EP by I Dont Know How but They Found Me
- Released: November 15, 2019
- Genres: Christmas; indie pop
- Length: 11:27
- Label: Fearless Records
- Producer: Dallon Weekes

I Dont Know How but They Found Me chronology
| 1981 Extended Play (2018) | Christmas Drag (2019) | Razzmatazz (2020) |

Christmas Drag is the second extended play from the American musical duo I Dont Know How but They Found Me. It was released through Fearless Records on November 15, 2019.

== Background and recording ==
In 2007, Dallon Weekes wrote the song "Christmas Drag" and recorded it with his band the Brobecks onto an 8-track cartridge. It would later be re-recorded for I Dont Know How but They Found Me by Weekes in mid-2019, stating "I’ve always been a sucker for Christmas music, and this was one of the first Christmas songs I ever wrote for myself".

The second song on the EP is a cover of Slade's "Merry Christmas Everybody", which Weekes discovered through the television series Doctor Who. While discussing the original song, Weekes stated "it's a crime that it isn’t as popular in the States. It's a fantastic song". The band intended to additionally create a cover of David Bowie and Bing Crosby's "Peace on Earth/Little Drummer Boy", but wasn't finished due to a failure to schedule a collaboration with Puddles Pity Party.

Specifically for the Christmas Drag EP, Weekes wrote the song "Oh Noel" with Nate Pifer. The song was recorded in one take by Weekes and Stuart Maxfield, with the former recalling the moment: "After we did the first pass, the engineer asked us if we wanted another take. We looked at each other and said no at the same time". In an interview with Alternative Press, Weekes described the song's meaning, stating "a lot of people seem to have or at least come across, at some point in their life, people on a more troubled path than they are. That's what ["Oh Noel"] ended up being about".

== Music videos ==
A music video was released for each song on Christmas Drag, beginning with a video for "Merry Christmas Everybody" on November 18, 2019. In the video, Weekes sings while drummer Ryan Seaman lies motionless in a chair with various people setting up Christmas decorations behind them. A music video for "Oh Noel" was released on November 29, 2019, with Weekes singing the song alone in front of a fireplace with a bottle of alcohol. The final video released on December 2, 2019, with Weekes singing "Christmas Drag" while Seaman decorates him with Christmas-themed items. All three videos were directed by Weekes and filmed in a singular take each with a still shot. Weekes used a "30-plus-year-old VHS camera" for filming and passed it off to an engineer for digital transfer.

== Track listing ==
Christmas Drag
| No. | Title | Writer(s) | Length |
|---|---|---|---|
| 1. | "Christmas Drag" | Dallon Weekes | 4:20 |
| 2. | "Merry Christmas Everybody" (Slade cover) | Noddy Holder; Jim Lea | 3:25 |
| 3. | "Oh Noel" | Weekes; Nate Pifer | 3:42 |
| Total length: | | | 11:27 |

== Personnel ==
Credits adapted from Tidal.

I Dont Know How but They Found Me

- Dallon Weekes – lead vocals, piano (3), recording producer (all tracks)
- Ryan Seaman – vocals (2)

Additional personnel

- Jed Jones – recording engineer
- Stuart Maxfield – guitar (1), vocals (2), piano (3)
- Ted Merritt – bass (2)
- Walter Hamen – cello (2)
- Emily Barrett Brown – viola (2)
- John Shin – violin (2)
- Rebecca Moench – violin (2)
- Skyler Patzer – piano (3)
