= The Oswegonian =

Newspaper

- The Independent Student Newspaper of Oswego State
- Type: Weekly student newspaper
- Format: Broadsheet
- Editor-in-chief: Dan Rys
- Managing editor: Emma Deloff
- News editor: Evan Youngs
- Opinion editor: Gabby Paterson
- Founded: 1935; 90 years ago
- Headquarters: 139A Campus Center; SUNY Oswego; Oswego, New York 13126
- City: Oswego, New York
- Circulation: 1,000 Weekly
- OCLC number: 24944762
- Website: oswegonian.com

The Oswegonian is the student-run newspaper of the State University of New York at Oswego. It was established in 1935, and currently distributes 1,000 copies around the campus and to selected locations off-campus on a weekly basis.

The Oswegonian was honored by the Society of Professional Journalists in 2002, and was recognized as a National Finalist in the category of "Best All-Around Non-Daily Student Newspaper (published less than twice a week)." The publication subsequently captured national runner-up honors.

The newspaper distinguishes itself from other student-run publications by being an independent club of the school, administered by the student government for Oswego State, rather than being a direct offshoot of the host school's School of Communication, Media and the Arts.

In previous years, The Oswegonian has broken national headlines, including the State University of New York revoking Charlie Rose's Doctorate of Humane Letters in early 2018, keeping up with other well-known student-run newspapers and other local newspapers in the area.
