= Ryan Seaman =

American drummer

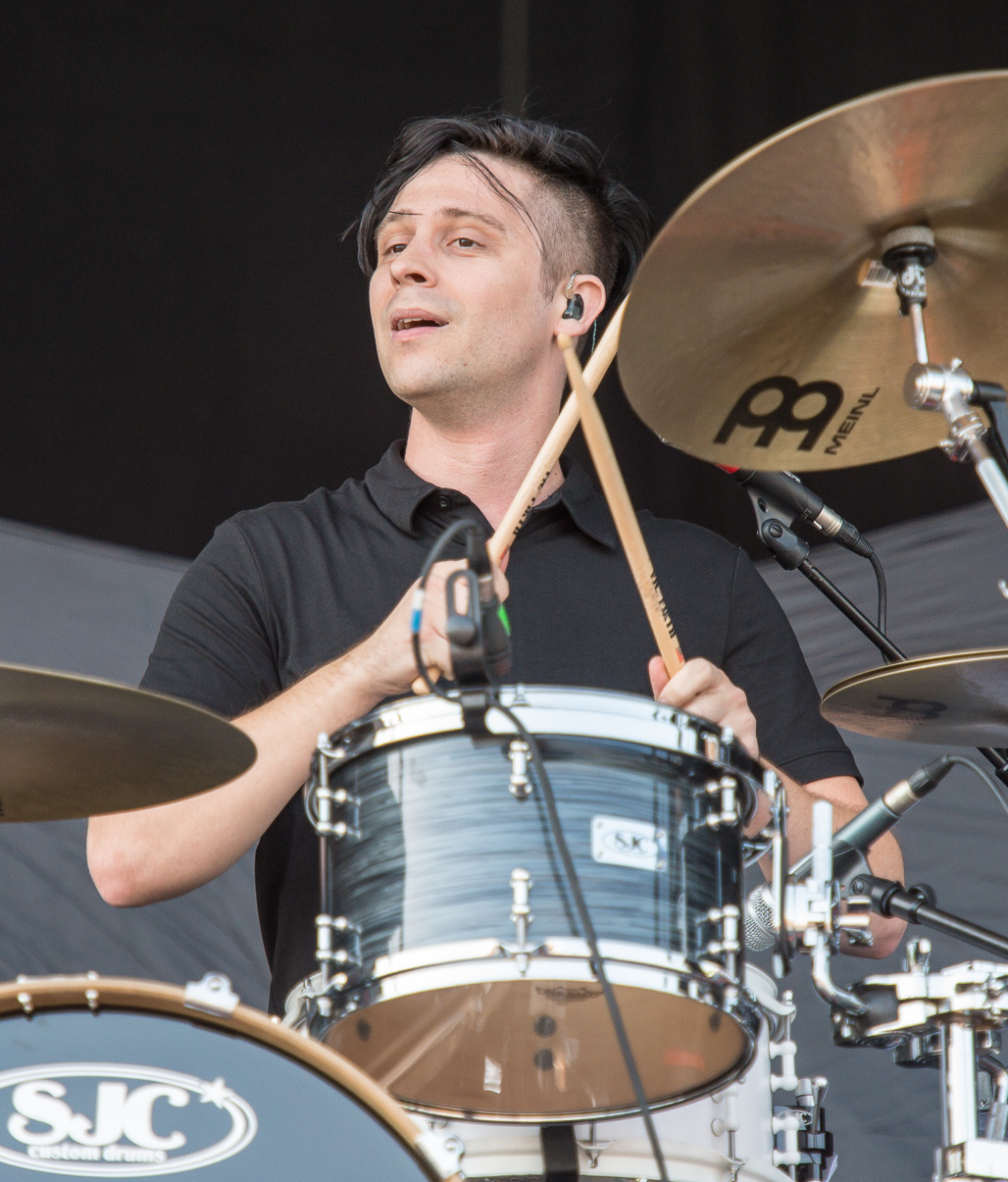
- Seaman at Rock im Park 2014

Background information
- Born: Ryan Eric Seaman; September 23, 1983 (age 43); Oxnard, California, U.S.
- Origin: Park City, Utah, U.S.
- Genres: Post-hardcore; hard rock; pop-punk; pop rock; emo; alternative rock
- Occupations: Musician
- Instrument: Drums
- Years active: 2002–present
- Member of: Mercy Music; The Juliana Theory
- Formerly of: I Dont Know How but They Found Me; The Brobecks; I Am Ghost; The Bigger Lights; Falling in Reverse

Ryan Eric Seaman (born September 23, 1983) is an American musician who currently serves as the touring drummer for Letlive. He is best known as the longest tenured drummer for the band Falling in Reverse. He also formerly served as drummer and backing vocalist of the pop duo I Dont Know How but They Found Me.

== Career ==
=== Early years (2002–2011) ===
In 2002, Seaman got his first touring opportunity to play on the Vans Warped Tour, drumming for Lookout Records artist The Eyeliners.

In 2005, Seaman joined the post-hardcore band I Am Ghost, recording some tracks for their debut album, Lovers' Requiem, released in 2006. In April 2009 he joined the pop rock band The Bigger Lights, participating in two albums and an EP, leaving the band in May 2011. He has also participated as a drummer with artists such as The Brobecks, My Favorite Highway, Matchbook Romance, TR/ST, Weathers, Mest, Jeffree Star, Vanna, The Higher,Kiev, Cry Venom, Kill Paradise, Icon For Hire, and Aiden.

=== Falling in Reverse (2011–2017) ===
In late May 2011, Seaman officially joined the post-hardcore band, Falling in Reverse, replacing Scott Gee. The band released their first album, The Drug in Me Is You on July 26. Although he did not participate in the recording of the album, he is credited as part of the band. Seaman performed on the band's second studio album Fashionably Late, released on June 18, 2013. The band released their third studio album Just Like You on February 24, 2015.

Around the time of the band's fourth and more recent release with Seaman, Coming Home, it was rumored that he had parted ways with the band. This was confirmed when the band performed on May 8, without Seaman and with Chris Kamrada now playing drums for the band.

=== Icon for Hire (2017–2018) ===
Prior to his departure from Falling in Reverse, Seaman announced on April 6, 2017, that he would play supporting drums for rock band Icon for Hire starting May 3, 2017.

=== I Dont Know How but They Found Me (2014–2023) ===
Seaman performed drums on Dallon Weekes' various solo efforts, which led to Weekes proposing the idea to present themselves as a duo under the name I Dont Know How but They Found Me. Seaman and Weekes started playing small shows in late 2016, but kept the group secret. They officially debuted at Emo Nite Los Angeles' 2-year anniversary event on December 6, 2016. After the show, different sources wrote about a "new side project" by Seaman and Weekes, and confirmed the band name. Even when confronted with photos and videos taken at the shows, the duo denied the whole project for months, as they did not want to exploit their name recognition and association with the well-known bands they played in. In September 2023, Weekes made a statement via social media announcing Seaman's departure from the band, citing a "series of broken trusts" as being the reason for separation. After his departure, he went on to form the band Mercy Music.

=== The Juliana Theory & Mercy Music (2023–present) ===
Seaman is now an active member of The Juliana Theory, Mercy Music and touring drummer for letlive.

=== Other projects ===
In November 2014, Seaman was featured on Dallon Weekes' Christmas song titled "Sickly Sweet Holidays". Seaman also performed on Weekes' second Christmas single titled "Please Don't Jump (It's Christmas)", released in November 2016.

== Discography ==
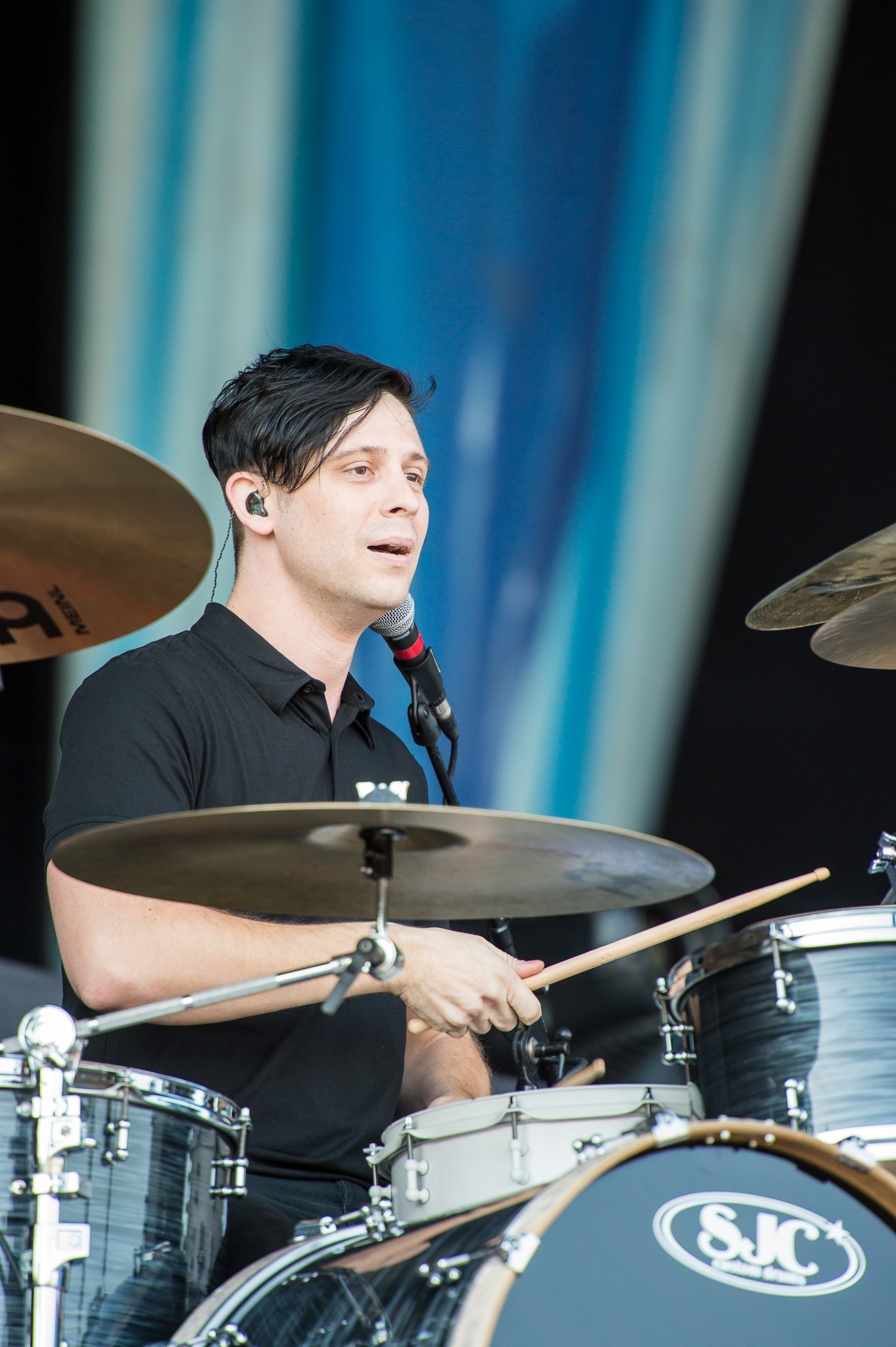
Seaman with Falling in Reverse in 2014

With Aiden

- Aiden (2016)

With I Am Ghost

- Lovers' Requiem (2006) – Tracks 2–12

With The Bigger Lights

- The Bigger Lights (2010)
- Battle Hymn (2011)

With Dallon Weekes

- Xmas Jambz (2015)

With Falling in Reverse

- The Drug in Me Is You (2011; credit only)
- Fashionably Late (2013)
- Just Like You (2015)
- Coming Home (2017)

With I Dont Know How but They Found Me

- 1981 Extended Play (2018)
- Christmas Drag (2019)
- Razzmatazz (2020)
