= Too Weird to Live, Too Rare to Die! =

2013 studio album by Panic! at the Disco

Studio album by Panic! at the Disco
- Released: October 8, 2013
- Genres: Pop rock; synth-pop; electropop; dance-pop; alternative rock
- Length: 32:32
- Labels: Decaydance; Fueled by Ramen
- Producer: Butch Walker

Panic! at the Disco chronology
Vices & Virtues (2011)	Too Weird to Live, Too Rare to Die! (2013)	Death of a Bachelor (2016)

Singles from Too Weird to Live, Too Rare to Die!
- 1. "Miss Jackson" Released: July 15, 2013; 2. "This Is Gospel" Released: August 12, 2013; 3. "Girls / Girls / Boys" Released: October 8, 2013; 4. "Nicotine" Released: May 6, 2014 (EP)

Too Weird to Live, Too Rare to Die! is the fourth studio album by American pop rock band Panic! at the Disco. The album was released on October 8, 2013 by Decaydance and Fueled by Ramen. Recorded as a trio, the album was produced by Butch Walker, and is the only album to feature bassist Dallon Weekes since he officially joined the band in 2011. This was also the final album to feature drummer Spencer Smith, thus making this Panic!'s final album as a rock band, with further releases being made as a solo project fronted by Brendon Urie.

Described as a "party record", Too Weird to Live, Too Rare to Die! was preceded by the singles "Miss Jackson" and "This Is Gospel", with "Girls / Girls / Boys" and Nicotine EP following after its release. The album's overall aesthetic is influenced by dance music, electronica and hip hop. Too Weird to Live, Too Rare to Die! debuted at number two on the US Billboard 200, earning the band their second career number two after Pretty. Odd. (2008). The song "Vegas Lights" would later be used as the Vegas Golden Knights' goal song.

== Writing and composition ==
Musically, Too Weird to Live, Too Rare to Die! is inspired by hip hop in that "there are no rules". In an extension of that mantra, the album is an eclectic affair that varies wildly from song to song. Other inspirations for the album were drawn from electronic composers such as Kraftwerk, and Wendy Carlos (composer of the soundtrack of Tron and A Clockwork Orange). The album's sound has been described as pop, dance-pop, synth-pop, electropop, indie rock, alternative rock, pop rock, and emo.

=== Name origin ===
The name of the album was lifted from Fear and Loathing in Las Vegas, a book based on a Gonzo Journalism account of author Hunter S. Thompson's trip to Las Vegas to cover the Mint 400 - a desert race held yearly just outside Las Vegas. It was also a 1998 film directed by Terry Gilliam featuring Johnny Depp. It is a reference to the central idea of the album, which was inspired by lead singer Brendon Urie, and drummer Spencer Smith's home city of Las Vegas.

=== Lyrics ===
Urie's lyrical contributions to Too Weird to Live, Too Rare to Die! were further inspired by the band's city. Prior to the album's release, he noted: "When we did our first record, we were really bitter toward the whole Vegas scene. We weren't old enough to experience all of what Vegas is really known for. Even the shows, most of them were twenty-one and over. There was a lot of hostility, but over the past couple years, I've started to get rid of that cynicism and see it in a new light [...] I wanted to celebrate it." He penned much of the album's lyrics in the city itself: "There's some glitz, some glamour, but there's also the dingy, old Vegas side to the music."

The record's lyrics are very personal in nature. The first track, "This is Gospel" (written by Urie and bassist Dallon Weekes), talks about Smith's drug addiction. The original demo sat on Urie's laptop for months before he finally shared it with the rest of the band. The album's lead single, "Miss Jackson", was written about Urie's first sexual experiences during his youth. "When I was younger, I would mess around; I'd sleep with one girl one night, sleep with her friend the next night, and not care about how they felt, or how I made them feel. And then it happened to me, and I realized 'Wow, that's what that feels like? I feel really shitty.'" A hidden preview of "Vegas Lights" was featured in the announcement video of Fall Out Boy's Save Rock and Roll fall arena tour. "Vegas Lights" was intended as an anthem for carefree nights in Las Vegas, that most prominently reflected how Urie felt clubbing. "I felt this weird energy where everybody was having a good time, and it didn't matter," he remarked. "Dancing like nobody's watching. It was kind of beautiful.". The song also uses a sample from "Number 5" (a song used on Sesame Street in the 1970s) at the beginning of the song. "Girl That You Love" was originally written in French following a five-day vacation in France. Bassist Dallon Weekes, who also performed lyrical duties for the album, later penned the English lyrics for the song based on Urie's French demo.

The album's third single, "Girls / Girls / Boys", has been described by Dallon Weekes as being centered on a love triangle complicated by differing sexual orientations. When commented on about the video for "Girls / Girls / Boys", lead singer Brendon Urie said "It's inspired by D'Angelo's 'Untitled (How Does It Feel)' video."

The YouTube release of "Casual Affair" samples the quote "Looks innocent enough, doesn't it? But sometimes there are dangers involved that never meet the eye. No matter where you meet a stranger, be careful if they are too friendly" taken from the 1961 public domain anti-gay film Boys Beware. This quote is not present in the official album release.

"The End of All Things" was written about Urie's wife Sarah Urie, and is written as Urie's vows in their wedding. The song was written two days before they got married.

== Promotion ==
In August 2012, the band's last tour cycle, it was announced during a show that a new album was in the works. Soon, pictures of the band busy in the studio were posted on the band's Tumblr, Facebook, and Instagram. On July 15, 2013 the band announced Too Weird To Live, Too Rare to Die! for a release date of October 8 as an addition a new single "Miss Jackson" and music video.

On July 18, 2013 a small tour was announced to support the album with New Politics opening for them, starting on August 1, 2013, and ending August 22, 2013. On August 7, it was announced that drummer Spencer Smith would no longer be touring with the band, stating that "He is away getting the help that he needs." His final performance with the band was at the Canal Club in Richmond on August 5, 2013. With Spencer's leave of absence, Dan Pawlovich of the band Valencia filled in on tour.

On October 11, 2013, the band played a release show in Las Vegas at the Cosmo Pool. It was also announced that they would go on the Save Rock and Roll tour with Fall Out Boy. On October 14, 2013, 6 days after the album was released, the band announced a Too Weird to Live, Too Rare to Die! tour, starting on January 14, 2014, and ending on February 16, 2014. The band continued to tour until May 13, 2014, and announced a new tour, titled, The Gospel Tour beginning on July 18, 2014, and ending August 31, 2014.

== Artwork ==
The album's cover art features a black and white photograph of vocalist and guitarist Brendon Urie smoking a cigarette emitting rainbow-colored fumes. Drummer Spencer Smith and bassist Dallon Weekes appear in photographs within the album's supplemental artwork. Regarding the decision to feature a photograph of himself on the cover, Urie noted, "I love being the center of attention, I'm shameless about it. And being the lead singer, everyone thought it made sense, for me to be front and center. It felt right, since I was so close to these songs." In another interview, Urie said "[the album] really was just about times I had growing up in Vegas. I wanted to create that character. The person I am on the cover is not who I am. Even the smoking cigarettes — I've quit since then. But when I was a kid, that was the guy who ran around Vegas and owned it. He had a Liberace jacket and he was smoking a cigarette. He was owning the desert, he didn't give a fuck, and the smoke was colored — that to me was the quintessential Vegas guy."

== Commercial performance ==
In the United States, the album made its debut on the Billboard 200 at number 2, on the chart issue dated October 26, 2013, selling 84,000 copies. In its second week of selling, the album fell 17 spots, from number 2, to 19. After 108 weeks of charting on the Billboard 200, the album fell off.

The Vegas Golden Knights of the National Hockey League have used one of the songs from the album, "Vegas Lights," as their goal song since the team's debut in 2017.

== Critical reception ==
Professional ratings
Aggregate scores
Source	Rating
AnyDecentMusic?	6.1/10
Metacritic	72/100
Review scores
Source	Rating
AllMusic	3.5/5 stars
Alternative Press	4/5 stars
American Songwriter	3.5/5 stars
DIY	8/10
Evening Standard	2/5 stars
Kerrang!	4/5
Newsday	A−
PopMatters	4/10
Rolling Stone	3/5 stars
Time Out	4/5 stars

Too Weird to Live, Too Rare to Die! received generally positive reviews from music critics. On Metacritic, which assigns a normalized rating out of 100 from reviews from critics, the album received a 72 based on 8 reviews.

In a positive review, Matt Collar of AllMusic praised the album's exploration of different genres. In another positive review, Eric Allen of American Songwriter stated that while the album seems to be extremely dissimilar in the first listen, Brendon Urie's personal lyrics thematically tie them all together. In a mixed review, Jordan Blum of PopMatters wrote that the album felt like a continuation of Vices & Virtues and came off as obnoxious, generic, and too uninvolving to listen to.

== Track listing ==
All songwriting credits are adapted from the album's liner notes and the Global Music Rights database. (Note: The album's liner notes credit all songs to Panic! at the Disco, not noting individual members. Frontman Brendon Urie has stated that co-founding member and drummer Spencer Smith was absent during much of the album's sessions and didn't contribute to the songwriting of the record. This is supported by the Songview and Global Music Rights database, which don't attribute Smith to co-writing any tracks. Instead, most of the songs were written by Urie and the band's bassist Dallon Weekes, who were joined by other co-writers on several tracks.)

No.	Title	Writer(s)	Length
1.	"This Is Gospel"	Brendon Urie; Dallon Weekes; Jake Sinclair	3:07
2.	"Miss Jackson" (featuring Lolo)	Urie; Butch Walker; Sinclair; Amir Salem; Lauren Pritchard; Alex Goose	3:12
3.	"Vegas Lights"	Urie; Weekes; Walker; Jim Henson; Joseph Raposo	3:10
4.	"Girl That You Love"	Urie; Weekes	3:09
5.	"Nicotine"	Urie; Weekes; Salem	3:06
6.	"Girls / Girls / Boys"	Urie; Weekes	3:26
7.	"Casual Affair"	Urie	3:17
8.	"Far Too Young to Die"	Weekes; Urie	3:17
9.	"Collar Full"	Urie; Weekes	3:18
10.	"The End of All Things"	Urie	3:32
Total length:			32:32

Japanese and Target bonus tracks
No.	Title	Writer(s)	Length
11.	"Can't Fight Against the Youth"	Urie; Walker	2:45
12.	"All the Boys"	Weekes	3:12
Total length:			38:29

== Personnel ==
Credits for Too Weird to Live, Too Rare to Die! adapted from the album's liner notes and Tidal.

Panic! at the Disco

- Brendon Urie – lead vocals, guitar, piano, keyboards, synthesizers, programming, vocoder; songwriting (except 12)
- Dallon Weekes – bass, backing vocals, keyboards, synthesizers, bass synthesizer; songwriting (1, 3-6, 8, 9, 12)
- Spencer Smith – drums, percussion

Additional musicians

- Butch Walker – production, additional guitars, backing vocals; songwriting (2, 3, 11)
- Lolo – vocals and songwriting on "Miss Jackson"
- Rob Mathes – string arrangements, conductor
- Julian Leaper – concertmaster
- Emlyn Singleton – 2nd violin's leader
- Peter Lale – viola leader
- Dave Daniels – cello leader
- Tom Pigott-Smith – violin
- Alex Goose – songwriting (2)

Recording personnel

- Jake Sinclair – mixing, engineering; songwriting (1, 3)
- Todd Stopera – assistant engineer
- Amir Salem (Azeem) – additional engineering; songwriting (2, 5)
- Jonathan Allen – strings recording
- Chris Barrett – strings recording assistant
- Ted Jensen – mastering

Artwork

- Alex R. Kirzhner – creative direction, photography and design
- Panic! at the Disco – creative direction
- Chris Phelps – additional photos

== Charts ==
=== Weekly charts ===
Chart (2013)	Peak position
Australian Albums (ARIA)	26
Austrian Albums (Ö3 Austria)	70
Belgian Albums (Ultratop Flanders)	79
Belgian Albums (Ultratop Wallonia)	175
Canadian Albums (Billboard)	8
Dutch Albums (Album Top 100)	77
Finnish Albums (Suomen virallinen lista)	46
German Albums (Offizielle Top 100)	99
Irish Albums (IRMA)	23
New Zealand Albums (RMNZ)	15
Scottish Albums (Official Charts)	8
UK Albums (Official Charts)	10
US Billboard 200	2
US Top Alternative Albums (Billboard)	1
US Top Rock Albums (Billboard)	1

=== Year-end charts ===
Chart (2013)	Position
US Billboard Alternative Albums	31
US Billboard Rock Albums	51
Chart (2014)	Position
US Billboard Alternative Albums	37
US Billboard 200	177
US Billboard Rock Albums	40
Chart (2016)	Position
US Billboard 200	171

== Certifications ==
Region	Certification	Certified units/sales
Canada (Music Canada)	Gold	40,000^{‡}
New Zealand (RMNZ)	Gold	7,500^{‡}
United Kingdom (BPI)	Gold	100,000^{‡}
United States (RIAA)	Platinum	1,000,000^{‡}
^{‡} Sales+streaming figures based on certification alone.

== Release history ==
Region	Date	Format
Australia	October 4, 2013	Digital download
Australia	October 11, 2013	CD
