= Dallon Weekes =

American musician and singer-songwriter (born 1981)

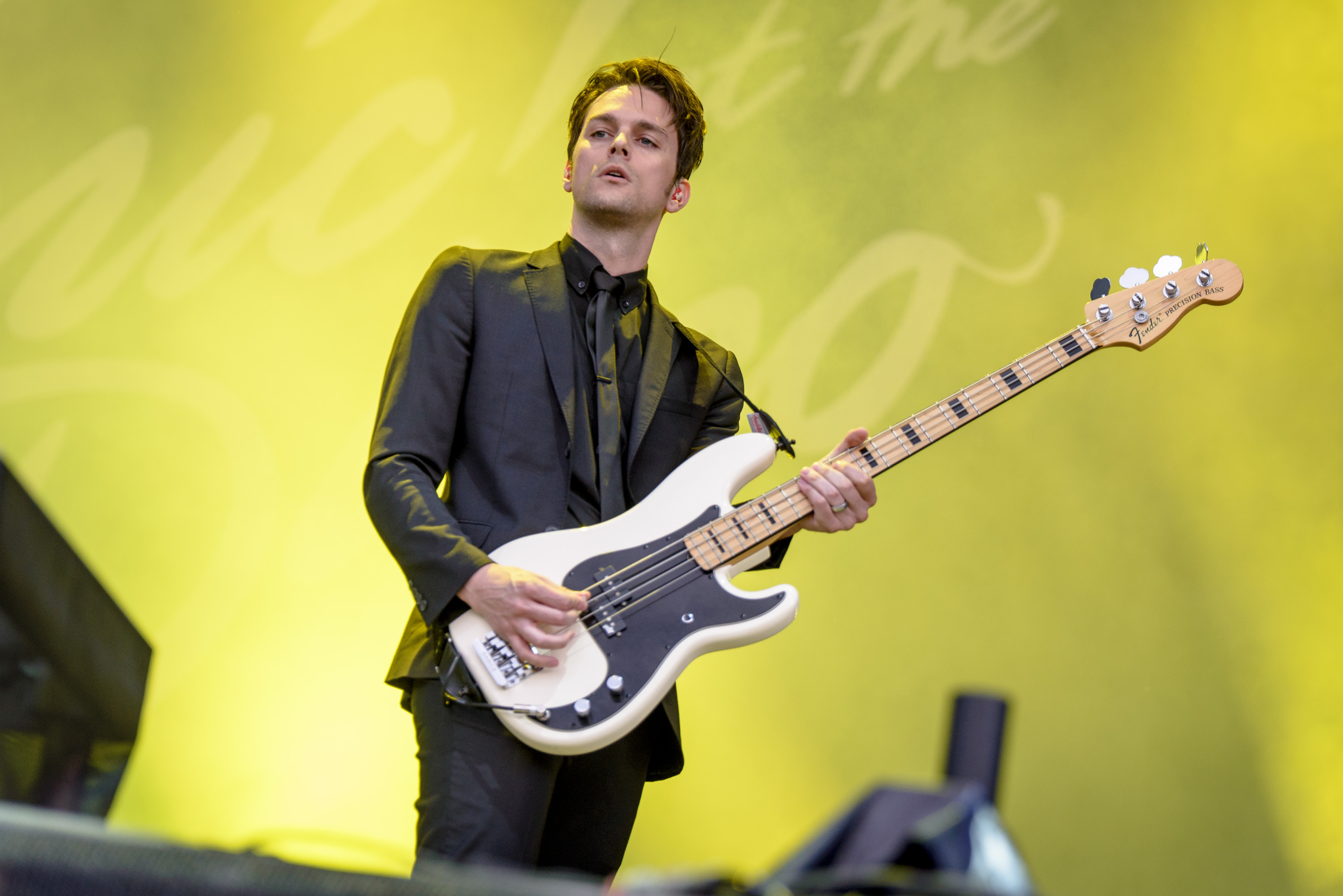
- Weekes in 2016
- Born: Dallon James Weekes; May 4, 1981 (age 45); Verona, Missouri, U.S.
- Occupations: Singer; songwriter; musician; record producer
- Years active: 2002–present
- Spouse: Breezy Douglas (m. 2006)
- Children: 2
- Musical career
- Origin: Salt Lake City, Utah, U.S.
- Genres: Pop rock; indie pop; new wave; alternative rock; power pop
- Instruments: Vocals; bass guitar; keyboards; guitar
- Labels: Concord; Fearless; DCD2; Fueled by Ramen; None You Jerk
- Member of: The Brobecks; I Dont Know How but They Found Me
- Formerly of: Panic! at the Disco

Dallon James Weekes (born May 4, 1981) is an American singer, songwriter, musician, and record producer. He was the frontman of the indie pop band the Brobecks, which temporarily operated as a solo project through the late 2000s. He was then a member of Panic! at the Disco from 2009 to 2017, performing in the band as a bassist, keyboardist, and backing vocalist. Weekes currently performs as the frontman of I Dont Know How but They Found Me.

== Music career ==
=== The Brobecks (2002–2013, 2024-present) ===
Weekes cofounded indie pop band the Brobecks in 2002 with former members of his previous group, 1000 West. Following the departure of original vocalist Scott Jones in 2003, Weekes became the band's primary songwriter alongside Michael Gross. The group self-recorded their debut album Understanding the Brobecks in 2003, performing their first concert at Kilby Court in Salt Lake City, Utah. Their second album, Happiest Nuclear Winter, was released through Never Break Records in 2005. It received favorable reviews from local press in Utah, followed by the band's first major headlining show. During this period, Weekes declined solo contract offers from Sony BMG and Interscope Records to keep the band independent. They underwent multiple lineup changes throughout their initial run, with Weekes becoming the sole member after Goodnight, and Have a Pleasant Tomorrow (2006).

The Brobecks released their fourth studio album in 2009 as Violent Things. On all its tracks, Weekes features as the sole writer and lead vocalist. The album included reworked versions of earlier songs alongside new material. Weekes released the EP Quiet Title in 2012, including the song "Clusterhug". The band performed their final show in 2013. On December 10, 2024, the band announced a remastered streaming release of Happiest Nuclear Winter, which was released on January 1, 2025. With collaboration from all four members originally involved with the album, they announced Not Dead Yet, an upcoming documentary film covering their early albums. In a March 2025 Rock Sound interview, the reunited band confirmed work on new material and discussed a potential deluxe edition of Happiest Nuclear Winter with unreleased demos and alternate mixes.

=== Panic! at the Disco (2009–2017) ===
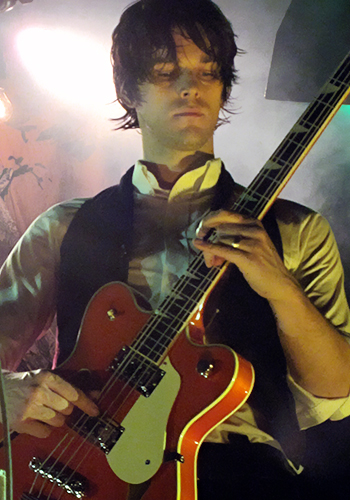
Weekes performing with Panic! at the Disco in 2011

After the departure of Ryan Ross and Jon Walker in 2009, Weekes and Ian Crawford were hired to replace Ross and Walker for Panic! at the Disco on a temporary, touring basis for their second studio album Pretty. Odd. (2008). Weekes' 'touring only' status changed in mid-2010, while on tour with the band in China. It was then that he was asked by Brendon Urie and Spencer Smith to join them indefinitely. However, his permanent status within the band remained publicly unknown until Weekes confirmed in mid-2012 via Twitter his involvement with the band as a full-time member.

During his tenure as an official member of Panic! at the Disco, Weekes was responsible for the conceptualization of the cover art for the band's third studio album, Vices & Virtues (2011), and was also featured on the album cover, masked and standing in the background behind Smith and Urie. He was credited with writing all but three songs on the band's fourth studio album, Too Weird To Live, Too Rare To Die! (2013). Weekes was also nominated for Best Bassist at the 2015 Alternative Press Music Awards. During the promotion of the band's fifth studio album Death of a Bachelor, it was rumored that Weekes' status has changed to that of a touring member once again. In October 2015, Weekes confirmed his departure from the official line-up of the band via Twitter, stating that he was "not contributing creatively anymore". Weekes elaborated on the situation in a September 2020 interview: "I did one record with Panic! and after that they started hiring hit-makers to create their records, so they didn't really need me anymore." After finishing up the tour for Death of a Bachelor, Weekes announced he was leaving Panic! at the Disco on December 27, 2017. He made this announcement via Instagram.

=== I Dont Know How but They Found Me (2016–present) ===
Initially a solo effort, Weekes had been writing and recording songs while on the road with Panic! at the Disco for several years. Former Brobecks bandmate Ryan Seaman performed drums on the record, which led to Weekes proposing the idea to present it as a duo under the name I Dont Know How but They Found Me (IDKHow).

Weekes and Seaman started playing small shows in late 2016, but kept it secret. They debuted at Emo Nite Los Angeles' 2-year anniversary event on December 6, 2016. After the show, different sources wrote about a "new side project" by Weekes and Seaman, and confirmed the band name. Even when confronted with photos and videos taken at the shows, Weekes and Seaman denied the whole project for months. Weekes later stated that they did not want to exploit both his and Seaman's name recognition and association with the well-known bands they played in. They announced their signing to Fearless Records in August 2018. In November 2018, they released their debut EP, 1981 Extended Play. The band released a Christmas EP, Christmas Drag, on November 15, 2019. The band's debut album, Razzmatazz, was released on October 23, 2020, and it was the only studio album to feature Seaman before he was fired from IDKHow by late-2023.

=== Solo musical projects ===
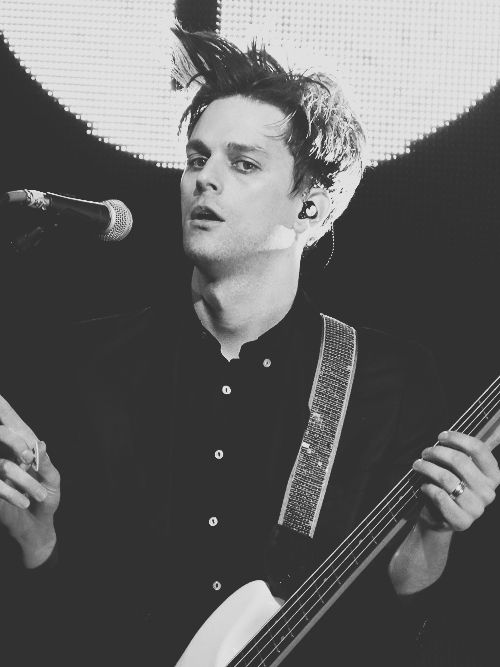
Weekes pictured in 2014

In September 2010, Weekes posted a free online download of "Skid Row", a song from the film/play Little Shop of Horrors, featuring Brendon Urie of Panic! at the Disco, Matt Glass and Ian Crawford, the touring guitarist of Panic! at the Disco from 2009 to 2012, and former member of such bands as The Cab and Stamps.

In November 2014, Weekes released a Christmas song titled "Sickly Sweet Holidays", featuring former Brobecks and Falling In Reverse drummer Ryan Seaman, and backing vocals performed by Twenty One Pilots vocalist Tyler Joseph. The song initially featured an entire verse by Joseph, but it was excluded due to Joseph's label.

In October 2015, Weekes started a cover series titled "TWOMINCVRS", where he self-releases covers of "lesser-known" songs, with a length of two minutes or less, through his personal YouTube channel. In 2016, Weekes released his second Christmas single titled "Please Don't Jump (It's Christmas)" on November 25, again featuring Seaman performing drums.

== Personal life ==
On March 18, 2006, Weekes married his girlfriend of over a year, Breezy Douglas. They have two children. Weekes was raised in Mormonism, but has since stated he is no longer practicing the religion. He has ADHD and autism.

== Discography ==
=== The Brobecks ===
- Understanding the Brobecks (2003)
- A Very Brobeck Christmas (2003)
- Remixing the Brobecks (2004)
- Happiest Nuclear Winter (2005)
- The Brobecks (2005)
- Goodnight, and Have a Pleasant Tomorrow (2006)
- Small Cuts (2007)
- I Will, Tonight (2008)
- Violent Things (2009)
- Your Mother Should Know #1 (2010)
- Quiet Title (2012)

=== Panic! at the Disco ===
- Vices & Virtues (2011) (artwork concept)
- iTunes Live (2011)
- Too Weird to Live, Too Rare to Die! (2013)
- Nicotine (2014)
- All My Friends We're Glorious: Death of a Bachelor Tour Live (2017)

=== Solo ===
- Xmas Jambz EP (2015)
- TWOMINCVRS EP (2016)

=== I Dont Know How but They Found Me ===
- 1981 Extended Play (2018)
- Christmas Drag (2019)
- Razzmatazz (2020)
- Gloom Division (2024)
