= The Ballad of Mona Lisa =

2011 single by Panic! at the Disco

Single by Panic! at the Disco

from the album Vices & Virtues
- Released: February 1, 2011
- Recorded: 2010
- Genre: Alternative rock; pop-punk; pop rock; power pop; baroque pop; emo
- Length: 3:47 (album version); 3:34 (music video version)
- Label: Fueled by Ramen; Decaydance
- Songwriters: Brendon Urie; Spencer Smith; Butch Walker; John Feldmann
- Producers: John Feldmann; Butch Walker

Panic! at the Disco singles chronology
"New Perspective" (2009)	"The Ballad of Mona Lisa" (2011)	"C'mon" (2011)

Music video
- "The Ballad of Mona Lisa" on YouTube

"The Ballad of Mona Lisa" (commonly referred to as simply "Mona Lisa") is a song by American alternative rock band Panic! at the Disco, released February 1, 2011, as the first single from the group's third studio album, Vices & Virtues (2011). Vocalist Brendon Urie wrote the song to express personal struggles and convictions many years prior to its official production for Vices & Virtues. The song impacted radio on February 15, 2011. The song has received positive critical reviews upon its release and reached number 89 on the Billboard Hot 100.

== Background ==
"The Ballad of Mona Lisa", written by lead singer Brendon Urie, was one of the first tracks composed for the band's third album, Vices & Virtues. As a song written before the band even began recording their second album, Pretty. Odd., it proved to be an inspiration for the production of Vices & Virtues. "A few of the ideas — like "The Ballad of Mona Lisa", specifically — was from an idea I had probably four years ago, before we even started touring on Pretty. Odd., and it was just sitting in my laptop collecting figurative dust on my hard drive, not really doing much," said Urie. "That ended up being a really good intro to the whole process." "I showed the band a couple times," said Urie, "but it just fell to the wayside, we never did anything with it. Other ideas beat it out or whatever reason it was.” He wrote the song dealing with his own personal convictions and struggles. "On the surface it can seem like just the story of drama between a guy and a girl," explains Urie. "But it's really about what I've been going through, an inner-struggle within myself, and fighting the dualities of my personality -- the side that fucks everything up and destroys everything and the other side that tries to pick up the slack. It's all growing pains." The song was also inspired by Urie's move from Las Vegas, Nevada, where he's lived his entire life, to Santa Monica, California, with Panic! drummer Spencer Smith. Urie notes that the move was "a huge part of growing up."

Musically, the song is similar to those produced for the band's debut album, A Fever You Can't Sweat Out (2005); however, Urie explained in a 2011 interview that the song represented more of a new beginning. Urie said "It was a new start when Spencer Smith and I started writing, so it was gonna end up sounding different, sonically." The music has been described as a combination of buzzsaw riffs, punchy percussion and literate, multi-layered lyrics. The song's title is an allusion to Mona Lisa, the famous Renaissance-era oil painting by Leonardo da Vinci. In a 2011 interview, Urie regarded the name and theme of the song as neither male nor female. “That whole thing with Mona Lisa was the idea that there is this character. For us, you look at the painting, and you can’t tell what this person is thinking. Not showing too much emotion, there’s this Mona Lisa smile masking what’s going on in that person’s head," he explained. "The song is about a battle in yourself […] an inner struggle in oneself. The duality in nature, where you see yourself as a bad person, and the good person trying to correct your bad habits. That’s what it was about. We thought that would be an easy way to describe how we were masking our own emotions and trying to figure out how we can solve the bad choices we make."

== Release ==
The single was announced in the December 2010 issue of Alternative Press. The track was originally titled "Mona Lisa", and was originally due for January 2011. On January 17, 2011, Fueled by Ramen posted a 30-second clip of the track on their Tumblr and YouTube accounts. On January 21, 2011, the song leaked in its entirety, and Panic! at the Disco released a lyric video on YouTube on January 24, 2011. Shortly after its February 1 debut on the iTunes Store, the single shot to #1 on iTunes' "Top Alternative Songs" chart, and remained a top ten favorite for the weeks following. The music video has had an even greater success: the video debuted at #1 on iTunes' "Top Alternative Music Videos" ranking, having also recently entered into heavy rotation across the MTV Networks: MTV, MTV2, mtvU, MTV Hits, and Logo's NewNowNext PopLab. The video received 120,000 streams on MTV.com within the week of its debut there and, as of April 3, 2022, has over 189.85 million views on Fueled By Ramen's official YouTube Channel. In Australia, "The Ballad of Mona Lisa" held the top position on iTunes' "Top Alternative Songs" chart for months following its release. The single's greatest charting success was in Australia where it reached #21 on the ARIA singles chart, spending eleven weeks on it.

== Critical reception ==
Stylistically, "The Ballad of Mona Lisa" has been labeled as alternative rock, pop punk, pop rock, power pop, baroque pop, and emo. The song has received positive reviews upon its release. Two journalists from Spin reviewed the song positively. William Goodman of Spin, regarding the single, described the song as "an anthemic power-rock ballad with dark and personal undertones," while John MacDonald, in a review of the band's first official live show of the Vices & Virtues Tour, commented "At the Bowery, Panic! swung the song's sinister faux-cabaret verses into an absolutely towering chorus -- one that's destined to get blasted out of every sports bar and strip mall in the country over the next few months." USA Today called the track a "midtempo rocker" in lieu of a "ballad." Many journalists have noted the similarities between "The Ballad of Mona Lisa" and A Fever You Can't Sweat Out. Prior to the song's official release, Wendy Rollins, disc jockey for Philadelphia's WRFF (Radio 104.5) described the song via her Twitter account as "sounding a whole lot like A Fever You Can't Sweat Out." Emily Tan of AOL Music regarded the song's sound as "bringing fans back to the sound they were introduced to when the band first broke onto the scene." The track was described by Alternative Press as "[having] the upbeat pop energy of A Fever You Can't Sweat Out, with the focus and clarity of Pretty. Odd." The song was nominated for the Kerrang! Award for Best Single.

In the UK on BBC Radio 1, the song, which was not released until 27 March, was Scott Mills' record of the week and went on to make the Radio 1 A-list on Wednesday 23 March.

"The Ballad of Mona Lisa" re-entered the Billboard Hot Digital Songs chart at #142 upon the release of Vices & Virtues.

== Music video ==
Urie in steampunk attire in the music video for "The Ballad of Mona Lisa".

The video of "The Ballad of Mona Lisa" was directed by Shane Drake (who previously directed the video for the band's breakthrough hit "I Write Sins Not Tragedies") and produced by Brandon Bonfiligo. The video was released on February 8, 2011, on MTV's website shortly after midnight. In a review of the video, MTV News' James Montgomery remarked, "In a lot of ways, "Mona Lisa" is as much about saying goodbye to the band's past as it is about embracing its future ... which sort of makes sense, and not just because the video takes place at a wake."

The steampunk-themed video bears many similarities to the video for "I Write Sins Not Tragedies", from the church setting to various camera shots (The top hat used in the clip of the dusty pews, is the same one used years prior for the music video for "I Write Sins Not Tragedies"). The video documents the steps for preparing and displaying a body before burial in the Victorian era, from shutting the windows and covering up mirrors to laying the body out in white so loved ones could mourn. This also serves as a way to stop communication between the dead and the living. The similarities to "I Write Sins Not Tragedies" were not lost on Smith and Urie. "When we were talking about the concept, somebody had the idea to kind of tie in to the beginning of the "Sins" video, and we realized it would work with it", Smith said. "It was a nice homage to some of the first stuff that we had done with Shane", Urie added. "And also, for us, mostly, it was closure."

The video's main feature was Urie encouraging a little girl to open the dead body's hand and find a note. She picks it up and opens it, exposing it to the others at the funeral. The note says, “Mary did it,” saying that one woman from the crowd who had been trying to stop communication with Urie had murdered the man and she is captured by a net.

The League of STEAM's full ensemble cast appear in key roles in the video. They also brought in additional cast members to further populate the scene and create a richer atmosphere with a unified aesthetic. With a newcomer by the name of Misty Rose acting as the betrothed of the deceased in which the wake is for. In addition, The League's Creative Director Nick Baumann acted as the production's primary steampunk consultant. On the set for the video, shot in Newhall, California, in January 2011, nods to Panic! at the Disco's past were present, from a clock on the wall (the main one set to nine o'clock, in honor of their "Nine in the Afternoon" video) to the dusty top hat resting on a church pew and the closing of the church's door (recalling "I Write Sins Not Tragedies"). Urie plays two separate characters, one "inspired by Sweeney Todd and very Johnny Depp," which Urie insists "was all [Shane Drake]'s direction." The ranch at which the video was shot was once the set for the HBO series Deadwood.

== Charts ==
Chart (2011)	Peak position
Australia (ARIA)	21
UK Singles (Official Charts)	43
US Billboard Hot 100	89
US Alternative Songs (Billboard)	24
US Rock Songs (Billboard)	50

== Certifications ==
Region	Certification	Certified units/sales
Australia (ARIA)	Gold	35,000^{^}
New Zealand (RMNZ)	Gold	15,000^{‡}
United Kingdom (BPI)	Gold	400,000^{‡}
United States (RIAA)	Platinum	1,000,000^{‡}
^{^} Shipments figures based on certification alone.^{‡} Sales+streaming figures based on certification alone.
