= Vices & Virtues =

Studio album by Panic! at the Disco
- Released: March 22, 2011
- Recorded: April 20 – July 26, 2010
- Genres: Pop rock; pop-punk; alternative rock; emo pop; baroque pop; synth-pop
- Length: 38:02
- Labels: Decaydance; Fueled by Ramen
- Producers: John Feldmann; Butch Walker

Panic! at the Disco chronology
...Live in Chicago (2008)	Vices & Virtues (2011)	Too Weird to Live, Too Rare to Die! (2013)

Singles from Vices & Virtues
- 1. "The Ballad of Mona Lisa" Released: February 1, 2011; 2. "Ready to Go (Get Me Out of My Mind)" Released: June 6, 2011; 3. "Let's Kill Tonight" Released: August 29, 2011

Vices & Virtues is the third studio album by American pop rock band Panic! at the Disco, released on March 22, 2011, by Fueled by Ramen. Produced by John Feldmann and Butch Walker, the album was recorded as a duo by vocalist and multi-instrumentalist Brendon Urie and drummer Spencer Smith, following the departure of lead guitarist, backing vocalist and primary lyricist Ryan Ross and bassist/backing vocalist Jon Walker in July 2009.

While Walker and Ross' exit left a hole in the Panic! songwriting regime, the experience became the catalyst for Urie deciding to take over as the band's principal songwriter. The lyrics touch on themes of manipulation and confusion. Vices & Virtues took over two years to create, and the increased time in the studio brought forth new musical experimentation. The album's artwork was conceptualized by touring bassist Dallon Weekes, who was inducted as a full-time member of the band near the end of recording.

Upon release, the album received mixed to positive reviews. Critics praised the album's wide variety of musical stylings, while criticism was aimed at the compositional simplicity and Urie's verbose lyricism. Preceded by its lead single, "The Ballad of Mona Lisa", the album debuted at number seven on the Billboard 200, selling 56,000 copies within its first week.

== Background ==
Material for a follow-up to Pretty. Odd. dates back to at least April 2008, just one month after the release of the record. Former guitarist and primary songwriter Ryan Ross told NME the band had "nine or ten new songs going right now," which picked up in the same direction of Pretty. Odd. "It was pretty much the same with the last record," bassist Jon Walker said. "We haven't stopped writing songs since we stopped recording Pretty. Odd., because we have a lot to write about [...] It's sounding 'pretty awesome,' which is probably what we're going to call the next record," Ross joked. "We've got quite a few new ideas and songs we've been working on, and we're hoping to record some of that stuff by the end of the year." The article explained that Walker said the band would be taking time off for the holidays and then re-entering the studio to record new music. In June 2009, singer Brendon Urie revealed the band had been writing for "roughly half a year now" at Ross' Topanga Canyon, California, home, and continued to take the band "further down the sun-dappled, retro-pop path [they] began exploring on Pretty. Odd.": "We've always been a pop band. We've always been fans of pop music, whether it's The Beatles – which is, like, the beginning of pop music – we've always been fans of good catchy melodies and lighthearted music." Spencer Smith, drummer, added, "We moved to California since the last record, so that's inspiration. We started surfing, too, so maybe we'll get a little Beach Boys vibe on this one." During this time, Smith moved in with Urie, while Ross began writing his own material with Walker at his home.

On July 6, 2009, Ryan Ross and Jon Walker announced via the band's official website that the two were leaving the band. The statement, in part, read: "Ryan Ross and Jon Walker will be leaving Panic at the Disco to embark on a musical excursion of their own. Though the four of us have made music together in the past, we’ve creatively evolved in different directions which has compromised what each of us want to personally achieve. Over the years, we have remained close and honest with each other, which helped us to realize that our goals were different and that parting ways is truly what is best for each of us." In an interview following the split, Ross explained that he first brought the idea to Smith in late June 2009 over lunch: "Spencer and I had lunch and caught up for a while, and then the big question came up, like, 'Well, what do you want to do?' and I said, 'Well, I think it might be best if we kind of do our own thing for a while,' and he said, 'I'm glad you said that, because I was going to say the same thing,' " Ross recalled. "And there was really no argument, which is really the best way that could've worked out." Ross said the split was largely due to creative differences between him and Urie. Urie wanted the band to explore a more polished pop sound, while Ross — and, by extension, Walker — was interested in making retro-inspired rock. Many of the songs originally created by Ryan and Jon for Panic!'s third album were later recorded and released as part of their new band, The Young Veins.

The news asserted that both tour plans with Blink-182 in August 2009 and new album production "will continue as previously announced," and the announcement ended with the teaser for a "surprise" soon to come. The following day, Alternative Press broke the news that "New Perspective", the first song recorded without Ross and Walker, debuted the following month on radio and as a part of the soundtrack to the film Jennifer's Body. "New Perspective" was recorded in spring 2009, when the band had just moved out to Topanga. Smith explained the song was inspired by the band's new experiences when there: "We're living near the ocean and going surfing every day, which we've never done before. We tried to get that out in the song, I guess." The band reinserted the exclamation mark into its name a few days after the departure of Ross and Walker.

== Recording and production ==
The writing and recording process for Vices & Virtues took much longer than the band intended. The band was "very confused" after the split from Ross and Walker, desiring instead to go on tour to understand better. As evidenced above, "Oh Glory" and "New Perspective" were largely recorded during the summer of 2009 with producer John Feldmann. "These songs are just Brendon and I having fun, because that's what we want to do," Smith told MTV News. Shortly after the departure of Ross and Walker, Smith revealed the band was recording: "We're working on an album now that, hopefully, takes the best parts from both of our records ... because we love them both and are really proud of them." While on the Blink-182 Reunion Tour, Smith showed Blink-182 singer/bassist Mark Hoppus several demos for the album, in hopes that he would produce a song or two. Hoppus confirmed in August 2009 that he was committed to producing one "really strong" track on the record, as well as possible others if allowed. During this time, Urie told news outlets the band had "about 10 songs" ready to consider for the band's third album. In the beginning stages, a song featuring Rivers Cuomo of Weezer, whom Urie later described as "super nice," was set to appear on the new album, but the song is absent from the final track listing. The band initially planned to record the album in fall 2009, to be released the beginning of 2010.

However, recording did not begin until April 2010. Friend and Pretty. Odd. producer Rob Mathes was "like family" to Smith and Urie, inspiring them to be excited to record despite the duo's initial beginning. He encouraged them to love the work they do, and "... Just get out of bed in the morning, don’t loathe the things that you actually love doing, because it’s just going to keep you down," for which Urie recalled the band "owed a lot" for. After working with the demos produced during the summer with Feldmann for several months afterward, the duo decided they weren't satisfactory, so the band started over with new material. The biggest difference for the band was that it was now half the previous band, with Urie and Smith writing everything. The album was produced by Feldmann and Butch Walker. Urie recalled that they were initially nervous to experiment with new producers, but instead regarded Feldmann and Walker's input positively, regarding their help as "Hey, this is your record, I want to help you with your ideas. So you bring me the ideas, and we’ll help you do that. I don’t want to write anything for you, this is your record, it has to be your voice." The band continued working with Feldmann for four months in early 2010, later going to Walker to finalize and improve the songs.

On May 7, 2010, the band posted a batch of photos during recording sessions for Vices & Virtues. All guitars and bass for the album were completed by early July, and, by the end of the month, Urie confirmed that recording of the album was complete and mixing would follow soon. Near the end of the writing process, the band looked back upon the lyrics and noticed that "some of the motion was pining for something, or some of it was vanity, or some of it touched on subversion or overthrowing of somebody or manipulation." Urie likened it to the seven deadly sins, and, after research, settled on the title Vices & Virtues. "In the Biblical sense, there's all that stuff and then there’s just morals that we live by every day and human behavior", Urie said. "I guess this record was really a study in human behavior—mostly for us personally what we had been going through, and noticing all of that."

== Music ==
Musically, Vices & Virtues has been described as pop rock, pop-punk, alternative rock, emo pop, baroque pop, synth-pop, pop, arena rock, and new wave.

The album features a variety of different musical styles in its tracks. As a testament to the amount of time of production, each song "sounds different from the next," according to Urie. In the beginning, the band had no direction for music or lyrics. However, after returning to the studio and restarting production, the band became excited to start with a second chance. "We've been working on music for about a year and a half, so I think that partly adds to why some of the songs have some varying styles," Smith said. "Part of it was us, at the beginning, trying to figure out what we wanted to do – we had a new opportunity with just the two of us – and as we sort of got a better hold on what that was, just kind of went from there." The duo picked the best songs out of 30 written as time went on. Urie said the most exciting part of the recording process was "...You get all the work done, record the song, arrange it and then you can add the fun little stuff, little pieces of voices and talking and weird instruments you hadn’t used before." The band's musical experimentation stretched as far as employing an iPad to record synthesizers on the record. The band got to work with French band The Plastiscines, and a children's choir on the track "Nearly Witches (Ever Since We Met...)"

A majority of the band's previous material was written by former guitarist Ryan Ross. For Vices & Virtues, Urie had "to step up and take the reins lyrically," which he regarded as having not much experience in prior. The biggest inspiration for lyricism was keeping busy and going out, instead of locking themselves in and writing. Urie has regarded the lyrics as very honest and straightforward, as well as very fantastical with elements of storytelling. Urie explained "We were so self-conscious about everything, hyper-aware of what we’re doing, that when we’re writing I go, "Okay, I don't want this to be Barry Manilow’s "Mandy", but I want it to be as romantic and cute ...’ There's a lot of that fighting within yourself. But it ended up being great, and I'm glad that we were able to figure out what we wanted to write about." The lyrics also reflect the confusion after the departure of Ross and Walker. The sessions with Feldmann at his home studio led to experimentation with new sounds. "We really loved Paul Simon and got into using marimbas and string instruments," explains Urie. "We ended up buying some synths and messing around with them. It was two kids in a candy store… and we listened to Arcade Fire's The Suburbs on repeat for me for the past… well, since it came out [laughs]."

"The Ballad of Mona Lisa" has been described by Alternative Press as "[having] the upbeat pop energy of A Fever You Can't Sweat Out, with the focus and clarity of Pretty. Odd." Urie has explained that he and Smith desired to achieve a sound that is more similar to the former: "We missed a couple things from our first record in terms of sonically, with these little instruments that we hadn’t really used on our second record. There [were] a lot of organic instruments and not a lot of electronics or synthesizers. So we wanted to get back to some of that." Smith agreed, and stated "I think there's stuff from the first album that we kind of got away from on the second record that people who were fans of the first one will enjoy." "The Calendar", originally written about an intimate relationship between a male and a female, soon began to resemble the friendships in former members Ross and Walker; the song was finished as a direct response to their departure from the group. "Sarah Smiles" was written for Urie's wife. "'Sarah Smiles' is about my girlfriend, actually, as sappy as that is," he told Spin in 2011. "When I met her I wrote this song to try and impress her. I was infatuated with her. I played it for her and we've been dating ever since. That was a huge step for me, personally." "Nearly Witches (Ever Since We Met...)" was rejected for inclusion on Pretty. Odd. due it not fitting within the concept of the album; Urie and Smith finished the song for Vices & Virtues.

== Promotion ==
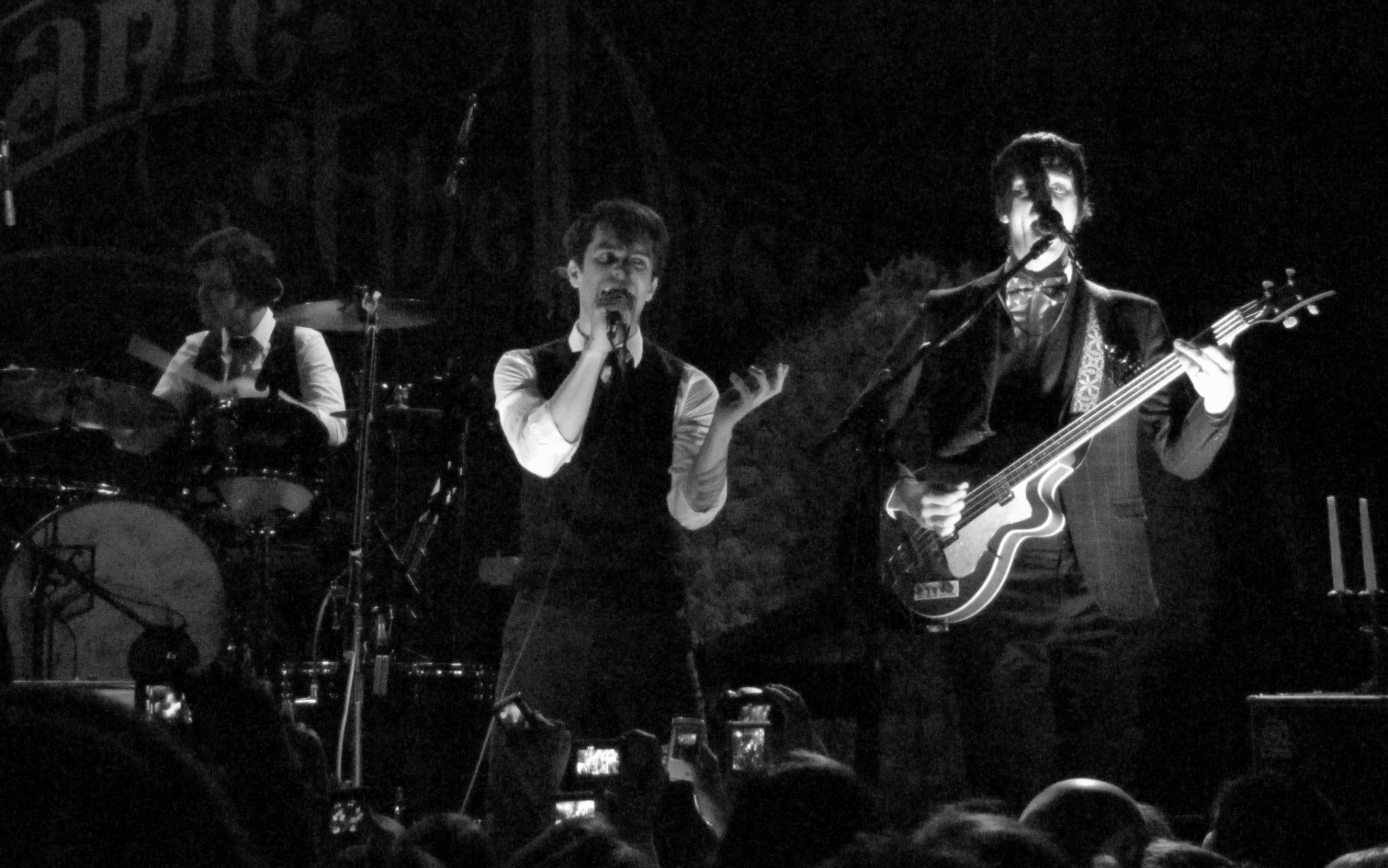
Panic! at the Disco performing on the first show of the Vices & Virtues Tour in New York City, February 1, 2011.

The album's title and other early information was announced in Alternative Press in its December 2010 issue: it set the album for a March 2011 release, "with the first single tentatively titled 'Mona Lisa' due out in January 2011." The band did a promotional Vices & Virtues photoshoot with designer Anthony Franco on the January 8, 2011. On January 18, the band revealed via a post on their website that the record would be released on March 29, 2011, and on January 25, the cover art was revealed. A behind the scenes video of the photoshoot revealed that Dallon Weekes, a touring only member at the time, featured on the album cover, masked and standing in the background behind Smith and Urie. On February 15, 2011, responding to eager public demand, the release date for Vices & Virtues was moved up to March 22 by the band.

The first single "The Ballad of Mona Lisa" was released on February 1, 2011. The music video for the single was released February 8, 2011, and entered heavy rotation across the MTV Networks. The single received positive reviews, many noting the similarity in sound to A Fever You Can't Sweat Out.

The deluxe edition of the album includes the demo "Oh Glory", which was initially released via the band's official website in July 2009 as a 30-second sample. Like Pretty. Odd., Vices & Virtues received heavy popularity through online music stores; by February 2011, the record was already up to the top five overall on the "Top Albums" chart. Promotion for Vices & Virtues included an appearance on Conan a week after the record's release on March 28, and Lopez Tonight a week after that on April 4, 2011.

In promotion of the record, Smith and Urie filmed a short film to accompany the album, titled The Overture. Directed by Shane Drake, the film was released on March 9, 2011, and contains several musical snippets from the record. The nearly seven-minute mini-film, features Urie and Smith with a score of actors ranging from identical twins to a little people couple. The film is filled with symbolism regarding the departure of Ross and Walker, and the process of moving on without them.

In March 2011, the band began streaming the album in its entirety (with the exception of bonus tracks) from the official Panic! at the Disco Facebook page, along with an accompanying introductory video from Urie and Smith.

== Release ==
Vices & Virtues was released March 18, 2011, in the United States, Brazil, and Canada, as well as multiple other dates for other countries. The record debuted at number seven on the US Billboard 200 chart, with first-week sales of 56,000 copies in the United States. This is in stark contrast to the group's previous effort, Pretty. Odd., which debuted in 2008 with first-week sales of 139,000. The album also came in second on Billboard's Alternative Albums chart and fifth on the Digital Albums ranking. As of January 2016, it has sold 194,000 copies in the United States.

In 2018, the album was certified Gold by the RIAA, indicating 500,000 albums shipped.

== Critical reception ==
Professional ratings
Aggregate scores
Source	Rating
AnyDecentMusic?	5.3/10
Metacritic	62/100
Review scores
Source	Rating
AllMusic	3.5/5 stars
Alternative Press	4/5 stars
American Songwriter	3/5 stars
Entertainment Weekly	B−
Evening Standard	4/5 stars
The Guardian	2/5 stars
PopMatters	7/10
Rolling Stone	3/5 stars
Spin	6/10
USA Today	3/4 stars

At Metacritic, which assigns a normalized rating out of 100 to reviews from mainstream critics, Vices & Virtues has received an average score of 62 out of 100, which indicates "generally favourable reviews" based on 15 reviews. Jarett Wieselman of the New York Post called the record "one of 2011's best and most captivating albums," calling "Sarah Smiles" the "stand-out" and noting the wise change in tone to high-energy with the second track, "Let's Kill Tonight". Alternative Press also welcomed the new version of Panic! at the Disco. "Perhaps Smith and Urie's biggest success on Vices is their disinterest in simply recreating either of their previous albums, instead choosing to meld the youthful exuberance of their debut with the restraint and maturity of 2008's Pretty. Odd.," wrote critic Evan Lucy. "The duo sound absolutely recharged, likely a result of the lineup shuffling, but also perhaps a realization that the '70s were a nice place to visit for a couple years, but life in the 21st century is much more fun." He went on to praise the "Elfman-esque string arrangements, creepy undertones and twinkling pianos" on several tracks and enjoy the "scaled-back," more personal tracks, such as "The Calendar" and "Memories". James Montgomery of MTV News said of the album, "Vices is at its very core a studio album, one stuffed with ideas and instrumentation, which not only positions Panic! as perhaps this generation's Brian-Wilsons-on-a-budget, but serves as a solid starting point for wherever Urie and Smith choose to go from here." He complimented the new sound of the band: "It's not exactly new, not exactly old, but it's definitely something. Call it a fresh start, a return to form, a re-imaging of the past, just don't call it Pretty. Odd. because that ship has sailed. Panic! are back to their old tricks, exclamation point and all ... and perhaps that was the secret ingredient all along."

Negative criticism for the album mostly came regarding the inexperienced lyricism of Urie. William Goodman of Spin criticized Urie's lyrics of the album ("the result is verbose and generic diary-entry romance") but praised the musical experimentation, remarking, "Vices & Virtues's saving grace, though, is the varied instrumentation – marimbas, xylophones, accordion, synths, and digital atmospherics." Jody Rosen of Rolling Stone concurred with Goodman and also focused positive opinion upon the arrangements of the album, recommending "Nearly Witches" and calling the album "emo retropop", commenting, "It's the closest emo has come to the sound of old-school pop and rock, with Beach Boys harmonies and even gypsy-style swing flavoring the usual hopped-up confessions." Mikael Wood of Entertainment Weekly agreed with these sentiments, recommending "The Ballad of Mona-Lisa" and the "harmony-drenched" "Sarah Smiles".

== Vices and Virtues tour ==
In support of the record, Panic! at the Disco announced multiple tours. Dubbed thus far as "An Intimate Evening with Panic! at the Disco", the short North American tour ran from January 23 to April 4, 2011. A full-fledged European tour took place May 2–17, 2011. Panic! had another tour of North America from May 20 to June 30, 2011. Continuing the album's theme of getting back to their roots, the tour took them back to the small stages they first played during their A Fever You Can't Sweat Out era. Joining them for the jaunt were to be their labelmates fun., with Foxy Shazam and Funeral Party splitting duties as the third act on the bill.

The tour sported the same electric, over-the-top theatricality the band was known for during the Fever era. "I really miss wearing costumes and makeup," Urie told Spin. "I love throwing a big production. I've recently been reading about Tesla coils and I'm trying to figure out how I can get one that sits on the stage and shoots sparks without hurting anybody."

== Uses in media ==
The song "Ready to Go (Get Me Out of My Mind)" was used as the end credit song for the 2011 film The Smurfs. It is also featured in three Diet Coke commercials in 2011, a commercial for Sky TV in the UK, a commercial promoting Universal Studios, and commercials for the 20th season of The Amazing Race. It has been used in The Block in Australia.

== Track listing ==
All tracks are written by Brendon Urie, Spencer Smith, and John Feldmann, except where noted.

No.	Title	Writer(s)	Length
1.	"The Ballad of Mona Lisa"	Urie; Smith; Butch Walker; Feldmann	3:47
2.	"Let's Kill Tonight"	Urie; Smith	3:33
3.	"Hurricane"		4:25
4.	"Memories"		3:26
5.	"Trade Mistakes"		3:36
6.	"Ready to Go (Get Me Out of My Mind)"	Urie; Smith	3:37
7.	"Always"		2:34
8.	"The Calendar"		4:43
9.	"Sarah Smiles"		3:33
10.	"Nearly Witches (Ever Since We Met...)"	Urie; Smith; Feldmann; Ryan Ross	4:16
Total length:			38:02

Shockhound bonus track
No.	Title	Writer(s)	Length
11.	"Kaleidoscope Eyes"	Urie	3:20
Total length:			41:22

Deluxe edition bonus tracks
No.	Title	Writer(s)	Length
11.	"Stall Me"		3:10
12.	"Oh Glory" (Demo)		3:03
13.	"I Wanna Be Free"	Urie; Smith	2:45
14.	"Turn Off the Lights"		4:00
Total length:			50:25

Japanese bonus tracks
No.	Title	Writer(s)	Length
11.	"Kaleidoscope Eyes"	Urie	3:20
12.	"Stall Me"		3:10
13.	"Oh Glory" (Demo)		3:03
14.	"I Wanna Be Free"	Urie; Smith	2:45
15.	"Turn Off the Lights"		4:00
Total length:			58:18

iTunes pre-order bonus track
No.	Title	Writer(s)	Length
11.	"Bittersweet"	Urie; Greg Kurstin	3:34
Total length:			41:36

== Personnel ==
Credits adapted from Vices & Virtues CD booklet.

Panic! at the Disco

- Brendon Urie – lead and backing vocals, guitar, bass guitar, piano, keyboards, synthesizers
- Spencer Smith – drums, percussion

Additional musicians

- Mike Bolger – trumpet & accordion on "Sarah Smiles"
- Plastiscines – vocals on "Nearly Witches (Ever Since We Met...)"
- The West Los Angeles Children's Choir – vocals on "Nearly Witches (Ever Since We Met...)"

=== Production ===
- Butch Walker – production (all tracks), recording, programming, additional guitars & backing vocals
- John Feldmann – production (all except "Let's Kill Tonight", "Memories", and "Ready to Go (Get Me Out of My Mind)") recording, programming, additional engineering
- Jake Sinclair – engineering
- Brandon Paddock – additional engineering
- Erik Ron – additional engineering
- Fred Archambault – additional engineering
- Matt Appleton – additional engineering
- Claudius Mittendorfer – mixing (all except "The Ballad of Mona Lisa")
- Rich Costey – mixing on "The Ballad of Mona Lisa"
- Pete Lyman – mastering
- Rob Mathes – string arrangements, conductor
- Jonathan Allen – string recording
- Lewis Jones – string recording assistance
- Joe Napolitano – editing
- Colette Barber – studio manager
- Brian Ranney – package production
- Anthony Franco – stylist
- Jennifer Tzar – photography
- Dallon Weekes – artwork conception, cover art

== Charts and certifications ==
=== Weekly charts ===
Chart (2011)	Peak position
Australian Albums (ARIA)	6
Austrian Albums (Ö3 Austria)	51
Belgian Albums (Ultratop Flanders)	71
Canadian Albums (Billboard)	17
Dutch Albums (Album Top 100)	76
German Albums (Offizielle Top 100)	64
Irish Albums (IRMA)	34
New Zealand Albums (RMNZ)	21
Scottish Albums (Official Charts)	33
Swiss Albums (Schweizer Hitparade)	90
UK Albums (Official Charts)	29
UK Rock & Metal Albums (Official Charts)	2
US Billboard 200	7
US Top Alternative Albums (Billboard)	2
US Top Rock Albums (Billboard)	2

=== Year-end charts ===
Chart (2011)	Position
US Top Rock Albums (Billboard)	56

=== Certifications ===
Region	Certification	Certified units/sales
United Kingdom (BPI)	Silver	60,000^{‡}
United States (RIAA)	Gold	500,000^{‡}
^{‡} Sales+streaming figures based on certification alone.

== Release history ==
Region	Date
Australia	March 17, 2011
Brazil	March 22, 2011
United States	March 22, 2011
Canada	March 22, 2011
Germany	March 25, 2011
United Kingdom	March 28, 2011
Japan	April 13, 2011
