= Jennifer's Body (soundtrack) =

Jennifer's Body (Music from the Motion Picture)

Soundtrack album by various artists
- Released: August 25, 2009
- Genres: Pop punk; indie rock; alternative rock; electropop; pop rock
- Labels: Fueled by Ramen; Fox Music
- Producers: Josh Abraham; Bernard Butler; Ed Butler; Dave Cooley; JD Cronise; Max Dingel; Andy Ernest; John Feldmann; John Janick; Greg Kurstin; Larry Livermore; Randall Poster; Lissy Trullie; Kevin Weaver; Josh Wilbur; Hayley Williams

Singles from Jennifer's Body (Music from the Motion Picture)
- 1. "New Perspective" Released: August 4, 2009; 2. "Celestial Crown" Released: September 2, 2009

Jennifer's Body (Music from the Motion Picture) is the soundtrack to the film Jennifer's Body. Released by Fueled by Ramen and Fox Music on August 25, 2009, it featured previously released music that consisted a range of genres such as indie rock, alternative rock, electropop, pop rock and pop-punk. Contributions to the soundtrack included music from bands such as White Lies, Florence + The Machine, Silversun Pickups, Black Kids, All Time Low, Cobra Starship and solo artists such as Little Boots and Paramore's lead singer Hayley Williams. The band Wilding contributes songs performed by the film's fictional band, Low Shoulder. The soundtrack was led by the singles "New Perspective" by Panic! at the Disco and "Celestial Crown" by The Sword. A deluxe edition with three more tracks also released on the same date.

== Background ==
According to Robert Kraft, vice president of Fox Music, the film "always had a musical sensibility from the start" and continued that as the music supervisors, continued to temp music for the film, it went clear with the Fueled by Ramen label having an array of bands, that matched the film's rhythm and attitude. The film further marked the independent label's soundtrack venture. The label's executive head, John Janick admitting that they did not pay a particular amount to secure rights for the soundtrack but agreed to spend the money to get the right music, even though declining the music supervision budget. The unpublished songs from the label's artists, were compiled into the album, that was intended to appeal the teen audience, following the success of Juno's soundtrack in 2007.

== Singles ==
"New Perspective" was the leading single for the soundtrack of Jennifer's Body, which was Panic! at the Disco's first single after the departure of guitarist Ryan Ross and bassist Jon Walker, both of whom were not involved in the track. The song was recorded during the spring of 2009, and few months later, the producers of Jennifer's Body asked the band for a song. Brendon Urie and Spencer Smith did not get to see a screening of the film beforehand at all, which left them wondering if the song would fit the film. Eventually, the two saw an early screening of it and found the song in a scene when the characters are getting ready for prom, in the background of a montage. After a solo acoustic performance of the song debuted at San Diego Comic-Con, the song was released as a single on August 4, 2009 through digital platforms. Another single, "Celestial Crown" by The Sword was released on September 2, a week after the album.

== Promotion ==
Tapulous, the now-defunct software and video game developer and publisher had developed an iPhone music game Tap Tap Revenge in partnership with 20th Century Fox to promote the film. The game had users developing a separate theme with the stills from the film, and the winners of the game might have their own theme alongside the track "New Perspective" as a part of the soundtrack.

== Reception ==
Professional ratings
Review scores
Source	Rating
Allmusic	3/5 stars
BBC	(unfavorable)

The album received a 3 out of 5 review from Allmusic, who described the album as having "a slightly different spin, mixing indie with the more expected punk, emo, and metal". Mike Diver at the BBC wrote an unfavorable review of the album, stating that "This assortment of acts says nothing of its parent film, beyond the occasional reference to school days and nods to something nasty coming this way". Writing for the Daily Athanaeum, Mackenzie Mays said "The energetic instrumentals on the tracks do a great job of incorporating the movie's evil cheerleader vibe, creating perfect songs to be played during any cliche, slow motion high school hallway scene. Many songs contain racy lyrics to contribute to the film, and most are undeniably catchy."

A review from Afterglow summarised "What makes this soundtrack superior to that of other dark comedy films is the songs’ entwinement with the movie's premise, just like how a fictional band with an indie anthem includes indirect lyrics about their satanic background. Unique tracks like "New Perspective'' and "Teenagers" complement the film’s satanic cults and man-eating-vixens by emphasizing the story’s teenage melodrama. Unlike any other horror soundtrack, Jennifer's Body provides temperamental emo-kid tracks that reflect the experience of anyone's teenage years — raging hormones and stubborn angst."

== Track listing ==
In total, the film features 22 songs, out of which only 17 tracks were included in the soundtrack. The first release had fifteen tracks featured in the album, while the deluxe edition additionally contributed two more tracks with a cue from Theodore Shapiro's score. Some of the tracks, such as "Urgent" by Foreigner, "Two Tickets to Paradise" by Eddie Money, "One More Night" by Ryan Levine, "I Wanna Love You" by Akon and "867-5309/Jenny" by Tommy Tutone, were played in the film, but not included in the soundtrack.

Original track list
No.	Title	Writer(s)	Artist	Length
1.	"Kiss with a Fist"	Matt Allchin, Florence Welch	Florence + the Machine	2:04
2.	"New Perspective"	John Feldmann, Brendon Urie	Panic! at the Disco	3:47
3.	"Teenagers"	Hayley Williams	Hayley Williams	2:05
4.	"New in Town"	Victoria Hesketh, Greg Kurstin	Little Boots	3:16
5.	"Finishing School"	Chris Carrabba	Dashboard Confessional	3:25
6.	"Through the Trees"	Andrew Ampaya, Ryan Levine	Low Shoulder	5:04
7.	"Time"	Cute Is What We Aim For, Feldmann	Cute Is What We Aim For	3:57
8.	"I Can See Clearly Now"	Johnny Nash	Screeching Weasel	2:17
9.	"Chew Me Up and Spit Me Out"	Cobra Starship, Sam Hollander, Dave Katz	Cobra Starship	3:57
10.	"Toxic Valentine"	Alex Gaskarth, Jimmy Harry, Tony Kanal	All Time Low	2:52
11.	"I'm Not Gonna Teach Your Boyfriend How to Dance with You"	Black Kids	Black Kids	3:37
12.	"Death"	Jack Brown, Charles Cave, Harry McVeigh	White Lies	5:00
13.	"Celestial Crown"	JD Cronise	The Sword	2:00
14.	"Little Lover's So Polite"	Brian Aubert, Christopher Guanlao, Joseph Lester, Nicole Monninger	Silversun Pickups	4:59
15.	"Ready for the Floor"	Alexis Benjamin Taylor, Owen Clarke, Al Doyle, Joseph Goddard, Felix Martin	Lissy Trullie	4:00
Total length:				52:12

Deluxe edition
No.	Title	Artist	Length
16.	"Violet"	Hole	3:25
17.	"In the Flesh"	Low Shoulder	2:41
18.	"Running After Chip"	Theodore Shapiro	2:29
Total length:			60:47

== Charts ==
Chart (2009)	Peak position
US Billboard 200	186
US Soundtrack Albums (Billboard)	13

== Personnel ==
Credits adapted from AllMusic.

- A&R (Fueled by Ramen) – Lesley Melincoff
- Art direction, design – Zachariah Mattheus
- Music co-ordinator – Jim Dunbar
- Soundtrack executive producer – John Janick, Kevin Weaver, Randall Poster
- Business affairs (Fox Music) – Tom Cavanaugh
- Legal affairs – Erica Bellarosa
- Music clearance (Fox Music) – Ellen Ginsburg
- Executive in charge of music (Fox Music) – Robert Kraft
- Executive in charge of soundtracks (Fueled by Ramen) – Kevin Weaver, John Janick
- Marketing director – Katie Robinson
- Mastering – Tal Miller
- Soundtrack producer – Josh Wilbur
- Art manager – Kristie Borgmann
- Packaging manager – Michelle Piza
- Music supervision (Fox Music) – Amy Driscoll
