= Wildling =

Wildling may refer to:

- Wildling (band), an indie rock band from Los Angeles, previously known as Test Your Reflex
- Wildling (character), one of a group of characters in George R. R. Martin's A Song of Ice and Fire series and the TV adaptation Game of Thrones
- Wildling (film), a 2018 film starring Bel Powley, Liv Tyler, and Brad Dourif
