= Let's Kill Tonight =

Single by Panic! at the Disco

from the album Vices & Virtues
- Released: August 29, 2011
- Length: 3:33
- Label: Fueled by Ramen; Decaydance
- Songwriters: Brendon Urie; Spencer Smith
- Producers: Butch Walker; John Feldmann

Panic! at the Disco singles chronology
"Ready to Go (Get Me Out of My Mind)" (2011)	"Let's Kill Tonight" (2011)	"Miss Jackson" (2013)

Music video
- "Let's Kill Tonight" on YouTube

"Let's Kill Tonight" is a song by the American rock band Panic! at the Disco, released on August 29, 2011, as the third and final single from their third studio album, Vices & Virtues (2011). The band released a tour video on August 23, 2011. The song was first revealed along with three other songs from the album on February 1, 2011, when the band performed at the Bowery Ballroom in Manhattan. The studio version made its debut in the band's short film The Overture, released 9 days before the album.

Brendon Urie has said of the song that it is about having fun. In an interview with Hollywire TV, he said, "The lyrics kind of talk about just the idea of, you know, when you’re like feeling cocky and you’re out with your friends, and you’re like "Yeah! We’re gonna kill it tonight, this is gonna be awesome”, and that's really what it was about, just, you know, one of those good times, the party times."

== In popular culture ==
"Let's Kill Tonight" is used during the climax of the 2024 superhero comedy film The Thundermans Return.

== Music video ==
The music video was uploaded to their official YouTube channel on August 23, 2011. It shows black-and-white clips of the band performing live in New York City, as well as other clips of the band touring on the road. The video was not intended to be an official video, but a second version remains unreleased. As of June 2026, the video has around 17 million views on YouTube.

== Reception ==
Matt James of PopMatters said it "is more indicative of Vice & Virtues' strengths." Josh Hall of Drowned in Sound thought the track was "simultaneously encouraging and disconcerting," but "nowhere near as gripping as any of those [songs] taken from A Fever You Can't Sweat Out." The song was listed as a track pick on AllMusic's review of the album.

== Track listing ==
All tracks are written by Brendon Urie and Spencer Smith.

Digital download
No.	Title	Length
1.	"Let's Kill Tonight"	3:34

== Certifications ==
Region	Certification	Certified units/sales
United States (RIAA)	Gold	500,000^{‡}
^{‡} Sales+streaming figures based on certification alone.
