= The Only Difference Between Martyrdom and Suicide Is Press Coverage =

Promotional single by Panic! at the Disco

from the album A Fever You Can't Sweat Out
- Released: 2005
- Studio: SOMD! (College Park, Maryland)
- Length: 2:54
- Label: Fueled by Ramen; Decaydance
- Composers: Brendon Urie; Ryan Ross; Spencer Smith
- Lyricist: Ryan Ross
- Producer: Matt Squire

Panic! at the Disco singles chronology
"The Only Difference Between Martyrdom and Suicide Is Press Coverage" (2005)	"I Write Sins Not Tragedies" (2006)

Audio video
- "The Only Difference Between Martyrdom and Suicide Is Press Coverage" on YouTube

"The Only Difference Between Martyrdom and Suicide Is Press Coverage" is a song by the American rock band Panic! at the Disco, from their debut studio album A Fever You Can't Sweat Out (2005). Promotional recordings of the song were issued in 2005. Although never officially serviced as a single, the song reached number 77 on the US Billboard Hot 100 and was certified Platinum by the Recording Industry Association of America (RIAA). The song also hit number 38 on the Pop Airplay chart and number 5 on the Alternative Airplay chart.

Like several of Panic! at the Disco's song titles on A Fever You Can't Sweat Out, the title of this track is paraphrased from the novel Survivor by Chuck Palahniuk.

== Remix ==
The Tommie Sunshine Brooklyn Fire Remix of the song is featured in the film Snakes on a Plane and appears on the film's soundtrack with contributions from Sunshine. It is also featured as the B-side to the group's next singles "I Write Sins Not Tragedies" and "But It's Better If You Do".

== Charts ==
=== Weekly charts ===
Weekly chart performance for "The Only Difference Between Martyrdom and Suicide Is Press Coverage"
Chart (2006)	Peak position
US Billboard Hot 100	77
US Alternative Airplay (Billboard)	5
US Pop Airplay (Billboard)	38

=== Year-end charts ===
Year-end chart performance for "The Only Difference Between Martyrdom and Suicide Is Press Coverage"
Chart (2006)	Position
US Modern Rock Tracks (Billboard)	30

== Certifications ==
Certifications for "The Only Difference Between Martyrdom and Suicide Is Press Coverage"
Region	Certification	Certified units/sales
United States (RIAA)	Platinum	1,000,000^{‡}
^{‡} Sales+streaming figures based on certification alone.
