= New Perspective (song) =

2009 single by Panic! at the Disco

Single by Panic! at the Disco

from the album Jennifer's Body: Original Motion Picture Soundtrack
- Written: 2007
- Released: July 28, 2009
- Recorded: 2009
- Length: 3:47
- Label: Fueled by Ramen; Decaydance
- Songwriters: Brendon Urie; John Feldmann
- Producers: Brendon Urie; John Feldmann

Panic! at the Disco singles chronology
"Northern Downpour" (2008)	"New Perspective" (2009)	"The Ballad of Mona Lisa" (2011)

Audio sample
- file; help

Music video
- "New Perspective" on YouTube

"New Perspective" is a song by American rock band Panic! at the Disco, released on July 28, 2009, as a single promoting the film Jennifer's Body. Vocalist Brendon Urie began writing the song two years prior to its recording regarding a lucid dream he had. The song was completed in the summer of 2009, and was co-written by producer John Feldmann. "New Perspective" was Panic! at the Disco's first single in aftermath of the departure of guitarist Ryan Ross and bassist Jon Walker, both of whom had no involvement in the track. It also saw the return of the exclamation point in their name, after it was retired during the Pretty. Odd. era.

The song made its radio debut in August 2009, but charted poorly in North America. It was a better success in Australia, where it peaked at number 69.

== Background ==
On July 6, 2009, Ryan Ross and Jon Walker announced via the band's official website that the two were leaving the band. In an interview following the split, Ross explained that he first brought the idea to Smith in late June 2009 over lunch: "Spencer and I had lunch and caught up for a while, and then the big question came up, like, 'Well, what do you want to do?' and I said, 'Well, I think it might be best if we kind of do our own thing for a while,' and he said, 'I'm glad you said that, because I was going to say the same thing,' " Ross recalled. "And there was really no argument, which is really the best way that could've worked out." Ross said the split was largely due to creative differences between him and Urie. Urie wanted the band to explore a more polished pop sound, while Ross — and, by extension, Walker — was interested in making retro-inspired rock. The departures came at a peculiar time for the band, reportedly in the final stages of completing the writing process of their third album. The news asserted that both tour plans with Blink-182 in August 2009 and new album production "will continue as previously announced."

"New Perspective" was recorded in the spring of 2009 with producer John Feldmann. Brendon Urie wrote the song two years prior after waking up from a dream. "I had this really lucid dream—it was so vivid I wanted to write it down before I forgot about it. I was never the best at explaining anything, so it wound up being random [lines] that ended up as the first verse," he said at the time. Urie wrote the first verse of the song and worked on the rest with Feldmann. Ross and Walker had no involvement in the track. The songs were described by drummer Spencer Smith as "Brendon and I having fun, because that's what we want to do." "New Perspective" was mentioned by Smith as a "side" of the new songs, 10 that were demoed in the summer of 2009. Smith described the styles as similar to that of both Frank Sinatra and Queen, with the electronic presence first found on the band's debut record, A Fever You Can't Sweat Out. Eventually, the producers of the film Jennifer's Body asked the band for a song. Urie and Smith did not get to see a screening of the film beforehand at all, which left them wondering if the song would fit the film. Eventually, the two saw an early screening of it and found the song in a scene when the characters are getting ready for prom, in the background of a montage.

== Release ==
The song was first announced by Alternative Press on July 7, 2009. The song was debuted in a solo acoustic performance at San Diego Comic-Con. "New Perspective" officially premiered on the band's MySpace page on July 28, 2009. Meanwhile, Ross and Walker debuted music from their new band, The Young Veins, at the same time, releasing their first track, "Change", through their MySpace as well. While Panic! announced the date in advance, the Veins did not. MTV credited The Young Veins with "attempting to steal [Panic!'s] thunder," to which Smith responded with "No, I wasn't shocked or mad at all. We had about three weeks of people not knowing what was going on with the bands, and it's kind of nice that the music was released at the same time."

"New Perspective" was shipped to radio August 18. The line "Can we fast-forward till you go down on me?" was edited out of the song's radio version and accompanying music video.

== Music video ==
The music video was filmed on July 22, 2009, with director Kai Regan. The video was released on iTunes on August 24, 2009.

The video was filmed at Alexander Hamilton High School, with students in different cliques such as cheerleaders, goths, etc. The video starts with Brendon Urie and Spencer Smith walking into the school in plain black suits and black sunglasses. They walk past the students, not paying attention even when fighting breaks out around them. The pair continues walking as the fire alarm sounds and the sprinklers activate. They take off their sunglasses and a few seconds later the scene rewinds, returning to the start off the video, and again showing Urie and Smith as they enter the school. The next part of the music video is shown in photographs rather than film. The pictures depict the pair getting shouted at by teachers, and being taken towards the front doors only to be attacked by the same students involved in the fight earlier. Urie and Smith get pushed and beaten through the hallways and down a staircase to where they are finally shown alone and in film again, limping away from the school, with bruises and damaged clothing. Throughout the music video are Jennifer's Body references, such as shirts that read, "I eat boys" and "Jennifer's Body", as well as clips from the film.

== Personnel ==
Credits for "New Perspective" are adapted from Tidal.

Panic! at the Disco

- Brendon Urie – lead vocals, guitar, piano, songwriting
- Spencer Smith – drums, additional vocals

Additional personnel

- John Feldmann – production, additional programming, additional vocals, recording, audio engineering, songwriting
- Erik Ron – engineering, additional vocals
- Steve Poon – engineering
- Gersh – engineering

== Charts ==
Chart performance for "New Perspective"
Chart (2009)	Peak position
Australia (ARIA)	69
Canada Hot 100 (Billboard)	78
US Bubbling Under Hot 100 Singles (Billboard)	4

== Release history ==
Release history and formats for "New Perspective"
Country	Date	Label
United States	July 28, 2009	Fueled by Ramen; Decaydance
United Kingdom	November 2, 2009	Fueled by Ramen; Decaydance
