= The Burning Hour =

Studio album by Test Your Reflex
- Released: 2007
- Genre: Indie rock/pop, Alternative rock
- Length: 49:13
- Label: RCA Records
- Producer: Pat Regan, Ryan Levine, Karl Louis

Professional ratings
Review scores
Source	Rating
Allmusic	2.5/5 stars

The Burning Hour is the debut album from California indie rock band Test Your Reflex. It was released on April 24, 2007 on RCA Records. It peaked at No. 46 on Billboard's Top Heatseekers chart (week of May 12, 2007)
.

== Track listing ==
1. I'm Not Sorry (5:09)
2. Pieces of the Sun (3:45)
3. Thinking of You (3:37)
4. New Year (3:53)
5. I Am Alive (5:11)
6. Black Hearts (3:17)
7. Do We Belong (4:36)
8. I Won't Follow (4:29)
9. This Year (If We Fall in Love) (3:47)
10. I Know You're Lonely (4:26)
11. Painted Red (7:04)

== Quotes ==
Making of
"We wrote for two years before we went into the studio, and we were really inspired by records that sounded big. We started out listening to a lot of danceable stuff, but we'd always go back to U2's Joshua Tree and Peter Gabriel's So -- two albums that are just rock solid from beginning to end and that just go for it. Because of that, we didn't shy away from big choruses or big production -- we wanted every song to be a journey." - Ryan Levine (The Official Homepage of RCA Records )

Album Review
CMJ (p. 43) - "Embracing the playful pity and sultry tenderness of iconic Cure, this SoCal combo produces consistently invigorating tracks..."

== Videos ==
Pieces of the Sun (YouTube)

== Charts ==
Chart (2007)	Peak position
U.S. Billboard Top Heatseekers	46
