= I Write Sins Not Tragedies =

2006 single by Panic! at the Disco

Single by Panic! at the Disco

from the album A Fever You Can't Sweat Out
- Released: January 16, 2006
- Studio: SOMD! (College Park, Maryland)
- Genre: Pop-punk; emo; alternative rock; baroque pop; pop rock
- Length: 3:06
- Label: Fueled by Ramen; Decaydance
- Composers: Brendon Urie; Ryan Ross; Spencer Smith
- Lyricist: Ryan Ross
- Producer: Matt Squire

Panic! at the Disco singles chronology
"The Only Difference Between Martyrdom and Suicide Is Press Coverage" (2005)	"I Write Sins Not Tragedies" (2006)	"But It's Better If You Do" (2006)

Music video
- "I Write Sins Not Tragedies" on YouTube

"I Write Sins Not Tragedies" is a song by American rock band Panic! at the Disco. It is the lead single and first single overall from their debut studio album, A Fever You Can't Sweat Out (2005), and was released in the United States as a digital download on January 16, 2006. The song is built upon a pizzicato cello motif that was played by session musician Heather Stebbins. It reached a peak of No. 7 on the US Billboard Hot 100, the band's only top-40 hit until the release of "Hallelujah" in 2015, and only top-10 hit until "High Hopes" in 2018. While the song failed to reach the top 10 of the Modern Rock Tracks chart, peaking at No. 12, the song's success on the Hot 100 and Mainstream Top 40 (at No. 2) made the song one of the biggest modern rock hits of 2006, and it is still one of the band's most-played songs on alternative radio stations.

In the United Kingdom, the song was released on February 27, 2006, as a limited-edition single with a free sticker. Because the sticker was included with the CD single, the song was not eligible for the UK Singles Chart; Official Charts Company rules state that stickers are not allowed in single releases. Later, due to the popularity of the track and following further single releases of "Lying Is the Most Fun a Girl Can Have Without Taking Her Clothes Off" and "But It's Better If You Do" reaching the top 40, the single was re-released on October 30, 2006. Despite receiving significant radio airplay upon its re-release, the single reached only No. 25 on the UK Singles Chart.

Many US radio stations, in response to the language found in the song, wanted an edited version. The lyrics "The poor groom's bride is a whore" and "Haven't you people ever heard of closing a goddamn door?" were changed by replacing "whore" with a "shhh" sound and removing "god" in "goddamn". Some stations – generally modern rock stations – still play the original version. "I Write Sins Not Tragedies" was ranked No. 3 in Billboard's Best 2000s Video poll, and Variety ranked it as one of the best emo songs of all time in 2022. The song was covered by Fall Out Boy, fellow Decaydance band, for their live album, Live in Phoenix. Fall Out Boy commonly uses the song's chorus as a lead-in to "This Ain't a Scene, It's an Arms Race" in concert.

== Composition ==
Musically, the song has been described as pop-punk, emo, alternative rock, baroque pop, and pop rock. The song is in the key of A minor and runs at a tempo of 88 beats per minute, with Urie's vocals ranging from the key of C4 to A5.

== Title ==
The title of the song, while not mentioned in the lyrics, refers to Douglas Coupland's novel Shampoo Planet, wherein the main character, Tyler Johnson, says: "I am writing a list of tragic character flaws on my dollar bills with a felt pen. I am thinking of the people in my universe and distilling for each of these people the one flaw in their character that will be their downfall – the flaw that will be their undoing. What I write are not sins; I write tragedies."

== Music video ==
Brendon Urie and Daniel Isaac McGuffey in the music video.

"I Write Sins Not Tragedies" is Panic! at the Disco's first single to have a music video, and the video was published on Fueled by Ramen's YouTube channel on July 18, 2006. (Note: "The Only Difference Between Martyrdom and Suicide Is Press Coverage" was the first single, but no video was filmed.) The video for the song takes place at a strange, circus-themed wedding played by the Lucent Dossier Vaudeville Cirque.

The video starts as the bride, played by Jessica Preston Gatena, and groom, Daniel Isaac McGuffey, are about to be married. Her family dress and behave formally, but they are revealed later to have fallen asleep and have eyes painted on their eyelids. The groom's family are lower-class entertainers and carnival folk, who interrupt the wedding. The ringmaster, played by vocalist Brendon Urie, acts as narrator and disrupts the events. After an argument between the two families, the bride runs out and is followed by one of her guests. The ringmaster drags the groom outside by his tie, where his fiancée is kissing the guest who followed her out of the church. The groom straightens up, looking shocked, and Urie and the groom bow to the camera. The ringmaster is revealed to be the groom's alter ego.

The music video, filmed by director Shane Drake, won the award for Video of the Year during the 2006 MTV Video Music Awards. This marked the first occasion since the 1989 VMAs that the winner of Video of the Year did not win in any other categories. The video was also ranked No. 7 on VH1's list of the Top 100 Videos of 2006.

The video was shot in December 2005. According to vocalist Brendon Urie, he and guitarist Ryan Ross suffered from the flu while filming the video clip. In August 2011, the video won Best VMA-Winning Video of All Time, in a worldwide poll on MTV's website.

== Credits and personnel ==
Credits are adapted from the liner notes of A Fever You Can't Sweat Out and Apple Music.

Panic! at the Disco

- Brendon Urie – lead and background vocals and guitar, songwriter, bass guitar (uncredited) (Note: Although Wilson is credited for playing bass, Smith has stated that Wilson did not participate in the album's recording and that Urie played those parts.)
- Ryan Ross – keyboards, songwriter
- Spencer Smith – drums, songwriter
- Brent Wilson – bass guitar (disputed)

Additional personnel

- Matt Squire – producer, mixing engineer, recording engineer, engineer
- Heather Stebbins - cello
- Samantha Bynes - violin

== Charts ==
=== Weekly charts ===
Chart (2006)	Peak position
Australia (ARIA)	12
Belgium (Ultratip Bubbling Under Flanders)	12
Canada AC (Billboard)	39
Canada CHR/Top 40 (Billboard)	8
Canada Hot AC (Billboard)	36
Germany (GfK)	66
Ireland (IRMA)	50
Mexico Ingles Airplay (Billboard)	38
Netherlands (Dutch Top 40)	29
Netherlands (Single Top 100)	45
New Zealand (Recorded Music NZ)	5
Scottish Singles Sales (Official Charts)	23
UK Singles (Official Charts)	25
US Billboard Hot 100	7
US Adult Pop Airplay (Billboard)	16
US Alternative Airplay (Billboard)	12
US Pop Airplay (Billboard)	2

=== Year-end charts ===
Chart (2006)	Position
Australia (ARIA)	50
US Billboard Hot 100	20

== Certifications ==
Region	Certification	Certified units/sales
Canada (Music Canada)	4× Platinum	320,000^{‡}
Denmark (IFPI Danmark)	Gold	4,000^{^}
Germany (BVMI)	Gold	300,000^{‡}
New Zealand (RMNZ)	3× Platinum	90,000^{‡}
United Kingdom (BPI)	2× Platinum	1,200,000^{‡}
United States (RIAA)	Diamond	10,000,000^{‡}
Ringtone
United States (RIAA)	Gold	500,000^{*}
^{*} Sales figures based on certification alone.^{^} Shipments figures based on certification alone.^{‡} Sales+streaming figures based on certification alone.

== Release history ==
Region	Date	Format(s)	Label(s)	Ref.
United States	January 16, 2006	Digital download	Fueled by Ramen; Decaydance	
United Kingdom	February 27, 2006	7-inch vinyl; CD	Fueled by Ramen; Decaydance	
Australia	May 22, 2006	CD	Fueled by Ramen; Decaydance	
United Kingdom (re-release)	October 30, 2006	7-inch vinyl; CD	Fueled by Ramen; Decaydance	
