= Ready to Go (Get Me Out of My Mind) =

Single by Panic! at the Disco

from the album Vices & Virtues
- Released: June 7, 2011
- Recorded: Summer 2010
- Genre: Power pop; pop rock; synth-pop; new wave; electropop
- Length: 3:37 (album version); 3:22 (music video version)
- Label: Fueled by Ramen; Decaydance
- Songwriters: Brendon Urie; Spencer Smith
- Producers: John Feldmann; Butch Walker

Panic! at the Disco singles chronology
"C'mon" (2011)	"Ready to Go (Get Me Out of My Mind)" (2011)	"Let's Kill Tonight" (2011)

Music video
- "Ready to Go (Get Me Out of My Mind)" on YouTube

"Ready to Go (Get Me Out of My Mind)" (commonly referred to as simply "Ready to Go") is a song by the American rock band Panic! at the Disco, released on June 7, 2011, as the second single from the group's third studio album Vices & Virtues (2011). A clip of the song was used on the band's short film, The Overture. The song received positive critical reviews on its release.

The song was used in the credits of The Smurfs. It was also on a preview of Ready Jet Go! with part of the song.

== Music video ==
On May 2, 2011, the video was premiered on the group's Facebook page. The video shows the band re-enacting old musical films such as Grease, Mary Poppins and Singin' In The Rain. The YouTube celebrity and dancer Dominic "D-Trix" Sandoval makes a cameo as a chimney sweep. The video was directed by Shane Drake.

As of April 2026, the video has had over 40 million views on YouTube.

== Track listing ==
All tracks are written by Brendon Urie and Spencer Smith.

Digital download
No.	Title	Length
1.	"Ready to Go (Get Me Out of My Mind)"	3:37

== Chart performance ==
Chart (2011)	Peak position
Australia (ARIA)	69

== Certifications ==
Region	Certification	Certified units/sales
United States (RIAA)	Gold	500,000^{‡}
^{‡} Sales+streaming figures based on certification alone.

== Release history ==
Country	Release date	Format(s)
United Kingdom	20 May 2011	Digital download
