= Lying Is the Most Fun a Girl Can Have Without Taking Her Clothes Off =

2006 single by Panic! at the Disco

Single by Panic! at the Disco

from the album A Fever You Can't Sweat Out
- Released: August 7, 2006
- Studio: SOMD! (College Park, Maryland); Dang! (Lewisville, Texas)
- Genre: Emo
- Length: 3:20 (album version); 2:57 (radio edit)
- Label: Fueled by Ramen; Decaydance
- Composers: Brendon Urie; Ryan Ross; Spencer Smith
- Lyricist: Ryan Ross
- Producer: Matt Squire

Panic! at the Disco singles chronology
"But It's Better If You Do" (2006)	"Lying Is the Most Fun a Girl Can Have Without Taking Her Clothes Off" (2006)	"Build God, Then We'll Talk" (2007)

Music video
- "Lying Is the Most Fun a Girl Can Have Without Taking Her Clothes Off" on YouTube

"Lying Is the Most Fun a Girl Can Have Without Taking Her Clothes Off", often shortened to "Lying Is the Most Fun...", is a song by American rock band Panic! at the Disco from their debut studio album, A Fever You Can't Sweat Out (2005). The song's title was taken from a line of dialog in the 2004 film Closer (based on a 1997 play of the same name). The line, spoken by Natalie Portman's character, Alice, is, "Lying is the most fun a girl can have without taking her clothes off, but it's better if you do." "But It's Better If You Do" is the name of another Panic! at the Disco song, and was released as a single before "Lying".

Released on August 7, 2006, "Lying" was the third single from the album. In the United States, the song impacted radio on October 17, 2006, and peaked at number 28 on the Billboard Alternative Songs chart, number 96 on the Pop 100, and number four on the Bubbling Under Hot 100 Singles chart. Internationally, the song reached number 39 on the UK Singles Chart, number 26 on the Australian Singles Chart, and number 33 in New Zealand Singles Chart.

== Background ==
"Lying Is The Most Fun a Girl Can Have Without Taking Her Clothes Off" was mainly written by Ryan Ross as his way of coping after finding out his girlfriend of 3 years had been cheating on him. He later said "At the time, it felt like the world had ended. I hated everything. I guess it's good I wrote it down. I might have stabbed someone."

The song's lyrics reference concepts such as infidelity, comparing one's self to an affair partner, and irrational decisions made by hormonal impulses.

== Music video ==
The music video was directed by Travis Kopach and filmed on June 19, 2006 in Los Angeles, California. The video premiered on MTV2 on July 14, 2006 and was uploaded to YouTube on September 29th, 2006. It features people with fish tanks on their heads. In it, Molly D'Amour's character picks up a stray fish and places it in her tank, which was meant to symbolize cheating. The video only shows the band in one scene (the paramedics are the band members), because the band felt that their looks were distracting from their music.

Panic! at the Disco has stated that the music video is simply a 1950s period short film and the man (Daniel Gomez) and woman (Molly D'Amour) are a couple, but not necessarily married. The music video includes a 15-second intro instead of starting the vocals right at the beginning. The band explained on Steven's Untitled Rock Show that they chose Kopach for the video because they felt his treatment was the most unconventional of the ones they had been offered.

== Charts ==
Chart (2006–2007)	Peak position
Australia (ARIA)	26
New Zealand (Recorded Music NZ)	33
UK Singles (Official Charts)	39
US Bubbling Under Hot 100 (Billboard)	4
US Alternative Airplay (Billboard)	28
US Pop 100 (Billboard)	96

== Certifications ==
Region	Certification	Certified units/sales
New Zealand (RMNZ)	Gold	15,000^{‡}
United Kingdom (BPI)	Gold	400,000^{‡}
United States (RIAA)	Platinum	1,000,000^{‡}
^{‡} Sales+streaming figures based on certification alone.

== Release history ==
Region	Date	Format(s)	Label(s)	Ref.
United Kingdom	August 7, 2006	CD	Fueled by Ramen; Decaydance	
United States	October 17, 2006	Alternative radio	Fueled by Ramen; Decaydance	
Australia	January 22, 2007	CD	Fueled by Ramen; Decaydance	
