= But It's Better If You Do =

2006 single by Panic! at the Disco

Single by Panic! at the Disco

from the album A Fever You Can't Sweat Out
- Released: May 1, 2006
- Recorded: Dang! (Lewisville, Texas)
- Studio: SOMD! (College Park, Maryland)
- Genre: Pop-punk; baroque pop
- Length: 3:25
- Label: Fueled by Ramen; Decaydance
- Composers: Brendon Urie; Ryan Ross; Spencer Smith
- Lyricist: Ryan Ross
- Producer: Matt Squire

Panic! at the Disco singles chronology
"I Write Sins Not Tragedies" (2006)	"But It's Better If You Do" (2006)	"Lying Is the Most Fun a Girl Can Have Without Taking Her Clothes Off" (2006)

Music video
- "But It's Better If You Do" on YouTube

"But It's Better If You Do" is a song by American rock band Panic! at the Disco, released on May 1, 2006, as the second single from their debut album A Fever You Can't Sweat Out (2005). Taking its title from a quote said by Natalie Portman's character in the 2004 film Closer, which the third single from the album, Lying Is the Most Fun a Girl Can Have Without Taking Her Clothes Off, also takes from. The song was written by band members Ryan Ross, Brendon Urie and Spencer Smith, and is about being in and not enjoying the location of a strip club. "But It's Better If You Do" failed to recreate the success the previous single "I Write Sins Not Tragedies" had in the United States but found chart prominence in Europe and Oceania, peaking at number 10 in New Zealand, number 15 in Australia and number 23 in the UK. The accompanying music video for the song, directed by Shane Drake, features the band performing at a masquerade-style strip club.

== Song information ==
Written by Ryan Ross and released on May 1, 2006, in the United Kingdom as a CD single, "But It's Better If You Do" is the third single to be released by Panic! at the Disco, and the second with an accompanying video. The song was released in the United States on May 16, 2006.

According to Ross, it is "a song about being in a strip club but not actually liking being in there. So I wanted it to be about the sort of complex inner-monologue. It's not completely fiction, though. It's based on a scenario when I was going through a breakup with a girl. Because in reality, I don't like strip clubs. I think they're kinda perverted." Ross went on to say, "When I wrote it, I never thought about it being played in strip clubs. But I guess it would be kind of a change from what they usually play in there", he said. "It would be a surreal experience, for sure. I think the tempo is too fast, though. So maybe someone would have to do a chopped-and-screwed version or something."

=== Title ===
The title is a quote from the film Closer in which the character portrayed by Natalie Portman says, "Lying is the most fun a girl can have without taking her clothes off... but it's better if you do". "Lying Is the Most Fun a Girl Can Have Without Taking Her Clothes Off" is also the title of another song by Panic! at the Disco, preceding it before the intermission on the album. In the UK iTunes the title is "But It's Better When We Do".

== Chart performance ==
Following its release in the United States, the song debuted at number 4 on Billboard's Bubbling Under Hot 100 Singles chart, before dropping to number 8 on the chart dated September 23, 2006. It peaked at number 81 on the Pop 100 and number 74 on the Hot Digital Songs chart.

In Europe, the song had better success. On the UK Singles Chart, it peaked at number 23; and, in the Netherlands, it peaked at number 89 on the Dutch Singles Chart. It also reached number 1 on the UK Rock Chart on May 14, 2006. The song also found success in the Oceanic regions; on the Australian Singles Chart, it peaked at number 15, and on the New Zealand Singles Chart, it reached number 10.

== Music video ==
The music video takes place in a masquerade-style strip club.

At the beginning of the song's music video, the song playing in the background is "Intermission", the song preceding "But It's Better If You Do" on the A Fever You Can't Sweat Out CD.

The music video begins with a black-and-white introduction of a man (played by the band's lead singer, Brendon Urie), arguing with his girlfriend. She is worried about him always singing at illegal strip clubs; he says he doesn't go to illegal strip joints, but he goes anyway.

The music video continues with the song in the overview of the strip joint. Urie performs onstage with the other members of Panic! at the Disco and a Las Vegas showgirls dance group. Urie sees a woman who seems to be unusually interested in him. They retreat to a private room. The two begin to kiss and Urie removes his mask. The woman likewise removes her mask to reveal that she was in fact his girlfriend. His girlfriend slaps him and turns to leave. As she gains headway, however, the police bust into the club and arrest her. Urie brawls with the chief, but is apprehended. They both are put into a police car, smirk knowingly at one and another, and the scene fades in the same black-and-white color as the intro. This was the last video to feature Brent Wilson on bass, released 2 and a half weeks before his removal from the band.

The video for "But It's Better If You Do" debuted on Total Request Live daily countdown on June 29, 2006, at number 8 and was directed by Shane Drake.

== Charts ==
=== Weekly charts ===
Chart (2006)	Peak position
Australia (ARIA)	15
Netherlands (Single Top 100)	89
New Zealand (Recorded Music NZ)	10
UK Singles (Official Charts)	23
UK Rock & Metal (Official Charts)	1
US Bubbling Under Hot 100 (Billboard)	4
US Digital Song Sales (Billboard)	74
US Pop 100 (Billboard)	81

=== Year-end charts ===
Chart (2006)	Position
Australia (ARIA)	97

== Certifications ==
Region	Certification	Certified units/sales
United Kingdom (BPI)	Silver	200,000^{‡}
United States (RIAA)	Platinum	1,000,000^{‡}
^{‡} Sales+streaming figures based on certification alone.

== Release history ==
Region	Date	Format(s)	Label(s)	Ref.
United Kingdom	May 1, 2006	CD	Fueled by Ramen; Decaydance	
United States	May 16, 2006	Digital download	Fueled by Ramen; Decaydance	
Australia	October 2, 2006	CD	Fueled by Ramen; Decaydance	
