= Wildling (band) =

American indie rock band

- Also known as: Test Your Reflex, No Country, Low Shoulder
- Origin: Thousand Oaks, California, U.S.
- Genres: Indie rock, indie pop, alternative rock
- Years active: 2014–present
- Label: RCA Records (until 2009)
- Members: Ryan Levine – vocals, bass, and guitar Justin Levine – bass Erik Janson – guitar Andrew Ampaya – keyboards Casey Wojtalewicz – drums
- Past members: Sal Cortez – drums, backing vocals Ryan Clark – lead guitar Agustin Sanchez – bass, backing vocals

Wildling is an indie rock band from Los Angeles, California signed to Warner Bros. Records. The band was formed in 2014 by members Ryan Levine and Andrew Ampaya, who were originally signed to RCA Records as the band Test Your Reflex from 2004 to 2009. They have also recorded music under the names No Country and Low Shoulder from 2009 to 2014.

== History ==
Wildling is the current name for the musical collaboration involving key members Ryan Levine and Andrew Ampaya. They have been recording music and touring under different band names since 2004.

=== Test Your Reflex (2004–2009) ===
The original group was composed of five musicians (Ryan Levine, Andrew Ampaya, Sal Cortez, Ryan Clark, and Augustin Sanchez), all between the ages of 19 to 21 at the time. As Test Your Reflex, they started out in the rehearsal rooms of a teen center in Thousand Oaks, California. They came together in early 2004.

Having played in various electronic and rock bands since grammar school, lead singer Levine decided he wanted to try something new. Inspired by classic albums like U2's The Joshua Tree, Peter Gabriel's So and Joni Mitchell's Blue, after experimenting in his garage, Levine gradually developed the sound that would become Test Your Reflex.

Levine met drummer Sal Cortez through an ex-girlfriend. The two then began searching for others to join them. After many months they finally found guitarist RC (a.k.a. Ryan Clark), a former guitarist of Los Angeles punk band R.O.H. Then came keyboardist Andrew Ampaya, a classically trained pianist with similar musical influences. Bassist Agustin Sanchez joined shortly after. This would be the first and final lineup of Test Your Reflex.

The band's debut release was The Burning Hour (released April 24, 2007) on RCA Records. The album has been described as having an 80s sound with hints of U2, The Cars, Simple Minds, The Cure, and The Killers.

The band featured on the MySpace Tribute to the Smashing Pumpkins album released on MySpace Records and distributed in the July 2007 issue of SPIN Magazine. They liken themselves to other bands on the Pumpkins tribute, such as The Bravery. All tracks appeared on each band's MySpace page from May 14, 2007. Test Your Reflex opened for The Smashing Pumpkins on July 22, 2007 at The Fillmore in San Francisco. Before that, from March 22, 2007 to May 12, 2007, Test Your Reflex toured the US with the Detroit-based band Electric Six.

Television performances include two appearances with Carson Daly. On June 22, 2007, the band appeared on Last Call with Carson Daly. The following month, they performed on the Carson Daly Show (aired July 12, 2007).

The complete list of media coverage/online releases for Test Your Reflex was as follows:

- Last Call with Carson Daly – July 12, 2007
- Rhapsody Ones To Watch for May – May 7, 2007
- LA Weekly Digital Jukebox – April 19, 2007
- LA Times "Buzz Bands" – April 19, 2007
- VH1 Hear Music First – April 17, 2007
- Artist Direct – April 12, 2007
- Pre-RCA Release of "Pieces of the Sun" on iTunes – April 10, 2007
- SPIN Magazine/SPIN.com "Artist of the Day" – January 5, 2007
- USA Today's Pop Candy Blog – December 5, 2006

Their song "Thinking of You" was featured as the background music of a radio commercial for Michelob Golden Light beer, heard in the Twin Cities and other markets in the midwest where the beer is sold.

=== No Country and Low Shoulder (2009–2014) ===
With the conclusion of their contract with RCA Records in 2009, the group changed its name to No Country. Ryan Levine and Sal Cortez appeared as members of the fictional band Low Shoulder in the 2009 film Jennifer's Body. The band performed the songs "Through the Trees" (written by Ryan Levine and Andrew Ampaya) and "One More Night" (written by Ryan Levine) as well as Blondie's "In the Flesh" in the film. The film's soundtrack includes the song "Through the Trees" by Low Shoulder.

=== Wildling (2014–present) ===
In November 2014, Ryan Levine and Andrew Ampaya formed a new five-member band with the name Wildling, made up of new members: songwriter and producer Erik Janson on guitar, previous member of indie California beach band Cayucas Casey Wojtalewicz on drums, and Ryan's younger brother Justin Levine on bass.

Wildling performed their first show at The Satellite in Los Angeles. They were immediately invited to headline The Satellite's residency in January 2015, and the next week, they were invited to support Young the Giant, who had attended the show. A few months later they performed in Austin for SXSW, and by summer 2015, they were recording their debut EP. The band has worked with different producers on different songs, including Doug Boehm (French Kicks, Dr. Dog), Caleb Shreve (Phantogram, Bear Hands), Ted Gowans (Tegan & Sara), and Ben Greenspan (Fences).

Ryan sent lead single "Hummingbird," directly to DJ Kat Corbett of KROQ, who added it to the regular rotation on her show, "Locals Only." The debut EP was released in October 2015.

Wildling is signed to Warner Bros. Records.

== Discography ==
=== As Wildling ===
==== Wildling EP ====
1. Hummingbird (YouTube) " The Song is Available on Spotify " 8 October 2014 (YouTube)
2. Doesn't Really Matter (SoundCloud) 2015
3. We Go All The Way (SoundCloud) 2015
4. Wolves (SoundCloud) 2015
5. Anywhere We Are (SoundCloud) 2015
6. Palindrome (SoundCloud) 2015

==== Non-EP Singles ====
"Like You Do" ft. Grace Kelly (SoundCloud) (iTunes) 2014
"Heart of Gold" (Neil Young cover) (SoundCloud) (iTunes) 2016

=== As No Country ===
Singles
"Right Time" on MySpace, July 14, 2010
"Faithful" on MySpace, July 14, 2010

=== As Low Shoulder ===
Single
"Through the Trees" on the Jennifer's Body soundtrack, August 25, 2009

=== As Test Your Reflex ===
Albums
The Burning Hour (RCA Records) April 24, 2007 – U.S. Billboard Heatseekers peak No. 46

Compilations
MySpace Tribute to The Smashing Pumpkins|Helio Presents: The Smashing Pumpkins Tribute CD, July 2007

Videos
Pieces of the Sun (YouTube)
