= A Fever You Can't Sweat Out =

2005 album by Panic! at the Disco

Studio album by Panic! at the Disco
- Released: September 27, 2005
- Recorded: June – August 2005
- Studio: SOMD! (College Park)
- Genres: Pop-punk; emo; baroque pop; dance-punk; alternative rock
- Length: 39:42
- Labels: Decaydance; Fueled by Ramen
- Producer: Matt Squire

Panic! at the Disco chronology
A Fever You Can't Sweat Out (2005)	Pretty. Odd. (2008)

Singles from A Fever You Can't Sweat Out
- 1. "I Write Sins Not Tragedies" Released: January 16, 2006; 2. "But It's Better If You Do" Released: May 1, 2006; 3. "Lying Is the Most Fun a Girl Can Have Without Taking Her Clothes Off" Released: August 7, 2006; 4. "Build God, Then We'll Talk" Released: March 26, 2007

A Fever You Can't Sweat Out is the debut studio album by the American pop rock band Panic! at the Disco, released on September 27, 2005, through Decaydance and Fueled by Ramen. It was produced by Matt Squire and recorded at SOMD! Studios in College Park, Maryland, over several weeks between June and August 2005.

The group formed in Las Vegas in 2004 and began posting demos online, which caught the attention of Fall Out Boy bassist Pete Wentz. Wentz signed the group to his own imprint label, Decaydance Records. It is the only album released during original bassist Brent Wilson's time in the band, but the exact nature of his involvement in the writing and recording process became a source of contention upon his dismissal from the group in mid-2006. The group had only graduated from high school one month before. With lyrics written by lead guitarist and backing vocalist Ryan Ross, the album is divided into halves stylistically; the first half is primarily pop-punk with elements of electronic music, while the second half is more baroque pop-influenced, employing more traditional instrumentation.

Upon its release, A Fever You Can't Sweat Out became a commercial success, peaking at number 13 on the Billboard 200. Its lead single, "I Write Sins Not Tragedies", peaked at No. 7 on the Billboard Hot 100, helping to bolster the album's sales to 1.8 million in the United States by 2011, thus making it the group's best-selling release. Three other singles were released for the album: "But It's Better If You Do", "Lying Is the Most Fun a Girl Can Have Without Taking Her Clothes Off", and "Build God, Then We'll Talk". While never officially released as a single, "The Only Difference Between Martyrdom and Suicide Is Press Coverage", also received airplay and charted in the United States, peaking at number 77 on the Billboard Hot 100 chart.

Despite its sales, the album polarized music critics, with many praising the album's catchiness and others criticizing its perceived lack of creativity. In late 2015, it received a double platinum certification from the Recording Industry Association of America (RIAA) for 2 million US shipments. It then received a quadruple platinum certification in June 2023. A 20th anniversary deluxe edition of the album, with all of the original tracks remastered, 11 previously unreleased demos, and the Live In Denver performance, was released on January 23, 2026.

== Background ==
Panic! at the Disco was formed in 2004 by high school friends Ryan Ross and Spencer Smith in Las Vegas. Both teens attended Bishop Gorman High School and they began playing music together in ninth grade. They recruited their friend Brent Wilson to join on bass guitar, and Wilson invited his classmate Brendon Urie to try out on guitar. The group soon began rehearsing in Smith's grandmother's living room. Urie grew up in a Mormon family, and often skipped rehearsals to go to church. The quartet decided to model their name after a line in Name Taken's song "Panic".

Ross and Urie soon began to record demos on their laptops, and posted them on PureVolume. They later sent a demo to Fall Out Boy bassist Pete Wentz via a LiveJournal account. Wentz, who was in Los Angeles at the time with the rest of Fall Out Boy working on the band's major-label debut, From Under the Cork Tree, drove to Las Vegas to meet with the young, unsigned band. Upon hearing "two to three" songs during band practice, Wentz was impressed and immediately wanted the band to sign to his Fueled by Ramen imprint label Decaydance Records. As news broke that Wentz had signed Panic! (who had yet to perform a single live show), fans on the Internet began to bash the group. In a 2006 interview, Ross stated "We had two songs online and people were already making assumptions on what kind of band we were and what we were going to sound like."

== Recording and production ==
After finishing high school, the members boarded a van and drove from Las Vegas to College Park, Maryland, to record the album. Although they only had demos when they arrived, the rest of the album shaped up fast through the recording session. Fueled by Ramen wanted the band to enter the studio earlier in the year, but Ross was attending college at UNLV and the others were still in high school. Urie graduated in May 2005 and the band pushed recording back to June. Smith and Wilson completed school online during production. They picked producer Matt Squire based on his production on several independent albums the group liked. The label had hoped they would pick Mike Green, who had worked with Paramore on All We Know Is Falling (2005).

A Fever You Can't Sweat Out was created in only "three and a half weeks" between June and August 2005, including mixing and mastering on a budget of $11,000. Urie's voice was blown after tracking the album. Squire remembered that most of the album's choruses and high harmonies were recorded in one session. By the end of production, the band hadn't had a day off and were exhausted. After its completion, "We had two weeks to come home and learn how to be a band," Ross said.

In the fallout of Wilson's firing from the band in May 2006 due to "lack of responsibility" and "not progressing musically with the band", the remaining members also alleged that Wilson did not participate in the writing and recording of the album, with Urie and Ross writing bass parts that were simplified so that Wilson could play them live, and Urie recording them in the studio. Wilson denied their statement, insisting that he was present in the studio every day, participating in writing, and teaching Urie how to play certain parts. He also sued the band for 25% of royalties from the album's sales, as stipulated in the original contract.

== Composition and lyrics ==
"Every song that we wrote for the first album made it. We didn't think about writing a bunch of songs and picking the best ones. We had to just make the best songs we ever wrote."

— Urie on the album's songs

A Fever You Can't Sweat Out is considered a pop-punk, emo, alternative rock, emo pop, baroque pop, and dance-punk album, with elements of electronica and doo-wop. The album is split into two halves: the first half is driven by synthesizers and drum machines, while the second half features Vaudevillian piano, strings, and accordion. The ambitious quality of the album's content was representative of the band's desire to "do whatever we wanted," according to Urie. Urie specifically cited the Beatles, Queen, the Smiths, Name Taken, and Keane's debut album, specifically its single "Everybody's Changing", as influences on the album. The band noticed that bands in the pop-punk scene, such as Fall Out Boy and Name Taken, were using long song titles. The band decided to take this a step further, creating increasingly long titles partially as an inside joke.

=== Songs ===
"London Beckoned Songs About Money Written by Machines"
"London Beckoned Songs About Money Written by Machines" takes a preliminary aim at webzines' criticism.

A Fever You Can't Sweat Out consists of 13 songs. The album opens up with "Introduction", before transitioning into "The Only Difference Between Martyrdom and Suicide Is Press Coverage", an initially acoustic guitar-led song which breaks down halfway through to an electronic, dance-oriented section. The third track on the album, "London Beckoned Songs About Money Written by Machines" is about calling out the music industry for "playing it safe" and "selling out". It contains quotes taken from the novel "Diary" written by Chuck Palahniuk, whom Ross greatly admired. The fourth track on the album is "Nails for Breakfast, Tacks for Snacks". "Camisado" is about a vengeful look at addiction, without some perspective that may come with age. "Time to Dance" re-tells the story of Invisible Monsters, also written by Palahniuk, and includes quotes such as "Give me envy, give me malice, give me your attention". Other references and quotes can be found throughout the album, such as "Just for the record, the weather today is..." "Lying Is the Most Fun a Girl Can Have Without Taking Her Clothes Off" tells a story about a lover cheating on her partner, and was based on a true story Ross experienced. The title of the song is taken from the 2004 film "Closer".

The album then leads into "Intermission", which begins as a techno loop and then transitions into a piano solo. It is then followed by "But It's Better If You Do", which is about being in a strip club, but not actually liking being in there. After that song, it is then followed by the tenth track on the album, "I Write Sins Not Tragedies". "I Constantly Thank God for Esteban" was a reference to an infomercial for Esteban Guitars the group found humorous. "There's a Good Reason These Tables Are Numbered Honey, You Just Haven't Thought of It Yet" is the second to last track. The album closes with "Build God, Then We'll Talk", with the track interpolating lyrics from the song "My Favorite Things" from The Sound of Music, written by Oscar Hammerstein II.

== Release ==
A Fever You Can't Sweat Out was released on September 27, 2005, through Decaydance and Fueled by Ramen. "The Only Difference Between Martyrdom and Suicide Is Press Coverage", was a success for the band at the time despite not being released as a single, peaking at number 77 on the US Billboard Hot 100 and number 5 on the Alternative Airplay charts. Additionally, it was certified platinum by the Recording Industry Association of America (RIAA). The lead single from the album, "I Write Sins Not Tragedies", was released on January 16, 2006, and fared much more successful, peaking at number 7 on the Billboard Hot 100 and making it onto the charts of 9 other countries, including its highest position at number 2 on the US Pop Airplay charts, additionally being certified diamond by the RIAA, 4× platinum by Music Canada (MC), and 2× platinum by the British Phonographic Industry (BPI) and Recorded Music NZ (RMNZ).

The second single, "But It's Better If You Do" was released on May 1, 2006, and was less successful than "I Write Sins Not Tragedies", although it did make the charts in five countries, peaking at its highest position, number 4, on the US Bubbling Under Hot 100 charts and being certified silver by the BPI. The third single, "Lying Is the Most Fun a Girl Can Have Without Taking Her Clothes Off" was released on August 7, and achieved similar success to "But It's Better If You Do", making the charts in four countries and was certified platinum by the RIAA and gold by both the BPI and the RMNZ respectively. The fourth and final single, "Build God, Then We'll Talk" was released on March 26, 2007. Although the song did not chart, the song was certified gold by the RIAA. Two other songs from the album, "Camisado", and "Time to Dance", were also certified gold by the RIAA, despite not being released as singles.

== Commercial performance ==
Sales of the album began relatively slow. It debuted at No. 112 on the Billboard 200 album chart and later peaked at number 13, spending 88 weeks on the chart in total. The album has sold over two million copies in the United States, receiving a double platinum certification from the RIAA, before receiving a quadruple platinum certification in June 2023. In Australia, the album peaked at number 11 on the ARIA Charts, alongside certifying platinum by the Australian Recording Industry Association itself. In Austria, the album peaked at number 37 on the Ö3 Austria Top 40. In Belgium, the album peaked at number 43 on the Ultratop charts.

In Canada, although the album did not chart, it was certified platinum by Music Canada (MC). In Germany, the album peaked at number 98 on the GfK Entertainment charts, its lowest chart entry. In the Netherlands, the album peaked at number 41 on the Dutch Charts. In New Zealand, the album peaked at number 7 on the Official Aotearoa Music Charts, its highest peak on any chart the album entered. The album was also certified platinum by Recorded Music NZ, In Switzerland, the album peaked at number 63 on the Swiss Hitparade. In the United Kingdom, the album peaked at number 17 on the Official Albums Chart and was certified platinum by the British Phonographic Industry (BPI), specifically selling 402,983 copies. By June 2011, the album had sold over 1.8 million copies in the United States.

== Critical reception ==
Professional ratings
Review scores
Source	Rating
AllMusic	2/5 stars
Drowned in Sound	6/10
Entertainment Weekly	B
Mojo	4/5 stars
MusicOMH	4/5 stars
Pitchfork	1.5/10
PopMatters	4/10
Rolling Stone	3.5/5 stars
The Skinny	3/5 stars
Stylus Magazine	D

A Fever You Can't Sweat Out divided music critics at the time of its release. Billboard, ten years after its release, deemed it "one of the most polarizing albums of our time". Cory D. Byrom of Pitchfork criticized the state of contemporary emo and bemoaned the album's apparent lack of "sincerity, creativity, or originality". Johnny Loftus of AllMusic was similarly negative, writing, "This is a band in love with making a record — making a statement — but there's nothing unique inside, neither in their formula nor the vaunted and sticky production." Lauren Gitlin of Rolling Stone complimented the album's sound, commenting, "What makes Panic different (and excellent) is their use of dance-floor synths and roboto drums, which redeems the album's whininess." A 2005 review for Sputnikmusic praised the album, stating that it is easy to dislike, but succeeds as catchy pop music with very little filler. Mike Diver, writing for Drowned in Sound wrote "What Panic! At The Disco have done, and cleverly, is steer clear of the carbon-copy format of their peers' records – each of these tracks sounds remarkably creative within the narrow channels of the stream they’ve chosen to sail down." David Bernard of PopMatters stated "It's an embodiment of a genre instead of an artistic achievement." In 2016, Rolling Stone listed it among the "40 Greatest Emo Albums of All Time", with James Montgomery dubbing it a "genre-defying blueprint" and commenting "it's difficult to argue that it's not a snapshot of where "emo" was at in 2005, right down to the sentence-long song titles."

=== Accolades ===
Accolades for A Fever You Can't Sweat Out
Year	Publication	Country	Rank	List	Ref.
2012	Rock Sound	United Kingdom	16	101 Modern Classics	
2016	Kerrang!	United Kingdom	16	The 50 Best Rock Albums of the 2000s	
2016	Rolling Stone	United States	39	40 Greatest Emo Albums of All Time	

== Deluxe edition re-issues ==
Live In Denver
- Directed by: Michael Drumm
- Produced by: Panic! at the Disco; Anthony Delia; Philip Botti
- Starring: Brendon Urie; Ryan Ross; Jon Walker; Spencer Smith
- Music by: Brendon Urie; Ryan Ross; Spencer Smith
- Distributed by: Fueled by Ramen
- Release date: 2006
- Country: United States
- Language: English

Live In Denver

Live album by Panic! at the Disco
- Released: October 20, 2025
- Recorded: July 22, 2006
- Venues: Fillmore Auditorium, Denver, Colorado, USA
- Length: 59:57
- Label: Fueled by Ramen

Panic! at the Disco chronology
Viva Las Vengeance (2022)	Live In Denver (2025)	A Fever You Can't Sweat Out (20th Anniversary Deluxe) (2026)

In 2006, A Fever You Can't Sweat Out was re-released as a Limited Edition Collectible Deluxe Box, packaged in a cigar box-shaped box set. The box set was limited to 25,000 copies. It included the original album on CD, a live concert titled Live in Denver on DVD, tarot cards for each song with lyrics printed on individual cards, 2006 tour program, poster of the band, live photo shots, a phenakistoscope, circus-styled mask, fake newspaper article and a blank notebook.

On October 20, 2025, Panic! at the Disco announced a 20th anniversary deluxe edition of the album, which was released on January 23, 2026. It includes a remastered version of the album, 11 previously unreleased demos, and Live in Denver on vinyl for the first time. On December 5, 2025, the demo version of "Lying Is the Most Fun a Girl Can Have Without Taking Her Clothes Off" was released as a digital single, along with a lyric video on the band's YouTube channel.

=== Live in Denver ===
Live in Denver is a live album and concert movie that was recorded on July 22, 2006, during the band's first headlining tour at the Fillmore Auditorium in Denver, Colorado. It primarily features songs from A Fever You Can't Sweat Out, along with two cover songs; "Karma Police" by Radiohead, and "Tonight, Tonight" by the Smashing Pumpkins. It is the group's first release with Jon Walker; Walker replaced Wilson in early 2006 as the group's bassist.

Live In Denver was initially released as a part of a limited edition box set of A Fever You Can't Sweat Out in 2006. On October 20, 2025, the live album was released on YouTube. It is also included on the A Fever You Can't Sweat Out 20th Anniversary Deluxe edition.

== Track listing ==
=== Original release ===
All lyrics are written by Ryan Ross; all music is composed by Brendon Urie, Ross, and Spencer Smith.

No.	Title	Length
1.	"Introduction"	0:37
2.	"The Only Difference Between Martyrdom and Suicide Is Press Coverage"	2:54
3.	"London Beckoned Songs About Money Written by Machines"	3:23
4.	"Nails for Breakfast, Tacks for Snacks"	3:23
5.	"Camisado"	3:11
6.	"Time to Dance"	3:22
7.	"Lying Is the Most Fun a Girl Can Have Without Taking Her Clothes Off"	3:20
8.	"Intermission"	2:35
9.	"But It's Better If You Do"	3:25
10.	"I Write Sins Not Tragedies"	3:06
11.	"I Constantly Thank God for Esteban"	3:30
12.	"There's a Good Reason These Tables Are Numbered Honey, You Just Haven't Thought of It Yet"	3:16
13.	"Build God, Then We'll Talk"	3:40
Total length:		39:42

=== Japanese edition ===
Japanese edition bonus track
No.	Title	Length
14.	"I Write Sins Not Tragedies" (live in Denver)	3:11
Total length:		42:57

Japanese edition enhanced material
No.	Title	Length
1.	"I Write Sins Not Tragedies" (music video)	3:06
2.	"But It's Better If You Do" (music video)	3:36
3.	"Lying Is the Most Fun a Girl Can Have Without Taking Her Clothes Off" (music video)	3:16
Total length:		9:58

=== 20th Anniversary Deluxe Edition ===
Disc 2 – Demos
No.	Title	Length
1.	"The Only Difference Between Martyrdom and Suicide Is Press Coverage" (demo)	3:16
2.	"London Beckoned Songs About Money Written by Machines" (demo)	3:46
3.	"Nails for Breakfast, Tacks for Snacks" (demo)	3:55
4.	"Camisado" (demo)	3:47
5.	"Time to Dance" (demo)	4:11
6.	"Lying Is the Most Fun a Girl Can Have Without Taking Her Clothes Off" (demo)	3:07
7.	"But It's Better If You Do" (demo)	3:11
8.	"I Write Sins Not Tragedies" (demo)	3:30
9.	"I Constantly Thank God for Esteban" (demo)	3:06
10.	"There's a Good Reason These Tables Are Numbered Honey, You Just Haven't Thought of It Yet" (demo)	3:19
11.	"Build God, Then We'll Talk" (demo)	3:35

Disc 3 – Live in Denver
No.	Title	Writer(s)	Length
1.	"Introduction" (live in Denver)		1:29
2.	"The Only Difference Between Martyrdom and Suicide Is Press Coverage" (live in Denver)		2:49
3.	"Time to Dance" (live in Denver)		3:41
4.	"London Beckoned Songs About Money Written by Machines" (live in Denver)		3:49
5.	"Karma Police" (Radiohead cover) (live in Denver)	Thom Yorke; Jonny Greenwood; Ed O'Brien; Colin Greenwood; Philip Selway	3:26
6.	"Camisado" (live in Denver)		3:37
7.	"Nails for Breakfast, Tacks for Snacks" (live in Denver)		3:50
8.	"Lying Is the Most Fun a Girl Can Have Without Taking Her Clothes Off" (live in Denver)		5:38
9.	"But It's Better If You Do" (live in Denver)		4:40
10.	"I Write Sins Not Tragedies" (live in Denver)		3:21
11.	"Tonight, Tonight" (The Smashing Pumpkins cover) (live in Denver)	Billy Corgan	4:07
12.	"There's a Good Reason These Tables Are Numbered Honey, You Just Haven't Thought of It Yet" (live in Denver)		4:24
13.	"I Constantly Thank God for Esteban" (live in Denver)		4:21
14.	"Build God, Then We'll Talk" (live in Denver)		5:05
Total length:			54:08

== Personnel ==
Credits are adapted from the album's liner notes, except where noted.

Panic! at the Disco

- Brendon Urie – vocals, guitar, keyboards, piano, organ, accordion; bass (uncredited) (Note: Although Wilson is credited for playing bass, Smith has stated that Wilson did not participate in the album's recording and that Urie played those parts.)
- Ryan Ross – guitar, keyboards, piano, accordion, organ; creative direction
- Brent Wilson – bass (disputed)
- Spencer Smith – drums, percussion

Additional musicians

- William Brousserd – trumpet (tracks 9, 12)
- Heather Stebbins – cello (tracks 8, 10, 12, 13)
- Samantha Bynes – violin (tracks 10, 12)

Production

- Matt Squire – production, engineering, mixing
- Panic! at the Disco – additional production
- UE Nastasi – mastering
- Emeka@Visualkoncepts.com – design
- Alan Ferguson – photography

=== Personnel (Live in Denver) ===
Personnel taken from the A Fever You Can't Sweat Out 2006 boxset liner notes.

Panic! at the Disco

- Brendon Urie – vocals, guitar, piano
- Ryan Ross – guitar, vocals, banjo, mandolin
- Spencer Smith – drums
- Jon Walker – bass, keyboards

Additional musicians

- Eric Ronick – keyboards
- Bartram Nason – cello
- Katie Kay – performer
- Erin "Dusty" Maxick – performer
- Roger Fojas – performer

Production

- Philip Botti – production; documentary direction and editing
- Anthony Delia – production
- Michael Drumm – production & direction
- El Armstrong – editing
- Matt James – editing
- Amy Weller – editing
- Kevin Clock – recording engineer
- Matt Squire – mixing engineer
- Emily Lazar – mastering

== Charts ==
=== Weekly charts ===
Weekly chart performance for A Fever You Can't Sweat Out
Chart (2006)	Peak position
Australian Albums (ARIA)	11
Austrian Albums (Ö3 Austria)	37
Belgian Albums (Ultratop Flanders)	43
Danish Albums (Hitlisten)	19
Dutch Albums (Album Top 100)	41
German Albums (Offizielle Top 100)	98
Irish Albums (IRMA)	59
Japan (Oricon)	20
Norwegian Albums (VG-lista)	37
New Zealand Albums (RMNZ)	7
Scottish Albums (Official Charts)	16
Swedish Albums (Sverigetopplistan)	26
Swiss Albums (Schweizer Hitparade)	63
UK Albums (Official Charts)	17
US Billboard 200 (Billboard)	13
US Top Rock Albums (Billboard)	2

=== Year-end charts ===
Year-end chart performance for A Fever You Can't Sweat Out
Chart (2006)	Position
Australian Albums (ARIA)	39
UK Albums (OCC)	88
US Billboard 200	32
US Top Rock Albums (Billboard)	4

== Certifications ==
Certifications for A Fever You Can't Sweat Out
Region	Certification	Certified units/sales
Australia (ARIA)	Platinum	70,000^{^}
Canada (Music Canada)	Platinum	100,000^{^}
New Zealand (RMNZ)	2× Platinum	30,000^{‡}
United Kingdom (BPI)	Platinum	402,983
United States (RIAA)	4× Platinum	4,000,000^{‡}
^{^} Shipments figures based on certification alone.^{‡} Sales+streaming figures based on certification alone.
