= I Dont Know How but They Found Me discography =

List of recordings by American duo

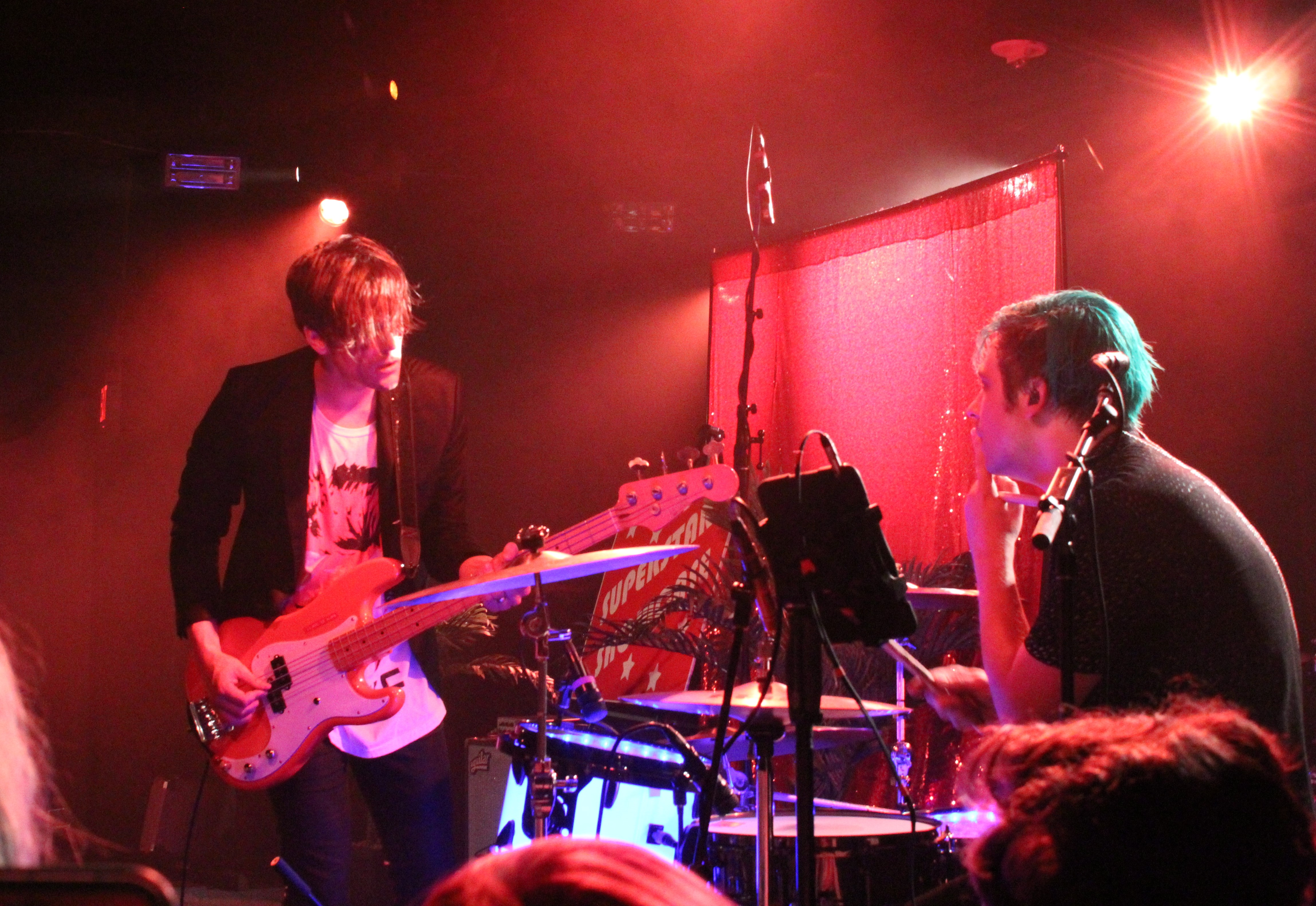
- I Dont Know How but They Found Me performing in June 2018; Dallon Weekes (left) and Ryan Seaman (right)
- Studio albums: 2
- EPs: 3
- Singles: 14
- Music videos: 15
- Promotional singles: 5

The discography of American indie-pop solo project I Dont Know How but They Found Me consists of two studio albums, three extended plays, fourteen singles, fifteen music videos, and six promotional singles. The project is also featured on two songs.

== Albums ==
=== Studio albums ===
List of studio albums, with selected chart positions
Title	Album details	Peak chart positions			
Title	Album details	US	US Alt.	SCO	UK
Razzmatazz	Released: October 23, 2020; Labels: Fearless; Formats: CD, digital download, LP	122	11	35	87
Gloom Division	Released: February 23, 2024; Labels: Concord; Formats: CD, CS, download, LP	— (Note: Gloom Division did not enter the US Billboard 200, but peaked at number 7 on the US Heatseekers Albums Chart.)	—	32	—

== Extended plays ==
List of extended play, with selected chart positions
Title	Extended play details	Peak chart positions			
Title	Extended play details	US	US Alt.	US Heat.	US Rock
1981 Extended Play	Released: November 9, 2018; Labels: Fearless; Formats: CD, CS, download, 12" EP	148	14	1	26
Christmas Drag	Released: November 15, 2019; Labels: Fearless; Formats: Digital download	—	—	—	—
Razzmatazz B-Sides	Released: June 12, 2021; Labels: Fearless; Formats: LP	— (Note: Razzmatazz B-Sides did not enter the US Billboard 200, but peaked at number 91 on the US Top Current Albums Chart.)	—	—	—

== Singles ==
List of singles as lead artist, with selected chart positions, showing year released and album name
Title	Year	Peak chart positions						Certifications	Album
Title	Year	US AAA	US Alt.	US Rock	US Rock Airplay	CAN Rock	JPN Over.	Certifications	Album
"Modern Day Cain"	2017	—	—	—	—	—	—		Non-album single
"Choke"	2017	—	13	29	22	—	—	RIAA: Platinum; MC: Gold	1981 Extended Play
"Do It All the Time"	2018	—	—	—	—	—	—	RIAA: Gold	1981 Extended Play
"Bleed Magic"	2018	—	—	—	—	—	—		1981 Extended Play
"Leave Me Alone"	2020	7	1	46	8	12	—		Razzmatazz
"Razzmatazz"	2020	—	—	—	—	—	—		Razzmatazz
"New Invention"	2020	—	27	—	—	—	—		Razzmatazz
"Lights Go Down"	2020	—	—	—	—	—	—		Razzmatazz
"Debra" (Beck cover)	2021	—	—	—	—	—	—		Razzmatazz B-Sides
"Mx. Sinister"	2021	—	—	—	—	—	—		Razzmatazz B-Sides
"What Love?"	2023	—	32	—	—	—	20		Gloom Division
"Gloomtown Brats"	2023	—	—	—	—	—	—		Gloom Division
"Infatuation"	2024	—	—	—	—	—	—		Gloom Division
"Downside"	2024	—	—	—	—	—	—		Gloom Division

=== Promotional singles ===
Title	Year	Album
"Nobody Likes the Opening Band"	2018	Razzmatazz
"Choke" (acoustic)	2019	Non-album single
"Leave Me Alone" (piano version)	2021	Razzmatazz B-Sides
"New Invention" (clubhouse session)	2021	Non-album single
"New Invention" (featuring Tessa Violet)	2021	Razzmatazz (Deluxe Edition)
"Turn to Stone" (ELO cover)	2026	Non-album single

=== As featured artist ===
Title	Year	Album
"Simple" (De'Wayne featuring I Dont Know How but They Found Me)	2022	My Favorite Blue Jeans
"Forever" (De'Wayne featuring I Dont Know How but They Found Me)	2025	June

== Music videos ==
List of music videos, showing year released and director
Title	Year	Director(s)	Album
"Modern Day Cain"	2017	Dallon Weekes	Non-album single
"Nobody Likes the Opening Band"	2018	Awesome Forces	Razzmatazz
"Do It All the Time"	2018	Raúl Gonzo	1981 Extended Play
"Choke"	2019	Raúl Gonzo	1981 Extended Play
"Social Climb"	2019	Christian Jacobs	1981 Extended Play
"Merry Christmas Everybody"	2019	—N/a	Christmas Drag
"Oh Noel"	2019	—N/a	Christmas Drag
"Christmas Drag"	2019	—N/a	Christmas Drag
"Leave Me Alone"	2020	Raúl Gonzo	Razzmatazz
"Razzmatazz"	2020	Everett Fitch	Razzmatazz
"Debra" (Beck cover)	2021	—N/a	Razzmatazz B-Sides
"Boys Don't Cry" (The Cure cover)	2021	—N/a	Razzmatazz (Deluxe Edition)
"What Love?"	2023	Raúl Gonzo	Gloom Division
"Infatuation"	2024	Matt Glass	Gloom Division
"Downside"	2024	Aiden Weber	Gloom Division
