= List of Billboard Alternative Airplay number ones of the 2020s =

Alternative Airplay is a record chart published by the music industry magazine Billboard that ranks the most-played songs on American modern rock radio stations. Introduced in September 1988, the chart is based on airplay data compiled from a panel of national rock radio stations, with songs being ranked by their total number of spins per week. Stations on the panel are electronically monitored by Mediabase, who replaced Broadcast Data Systems in this capacity beginning with the chart dated November 12, 2022. The first number-one song of the 2020s on the chart was "Orphans" by Coldplay.

== Number-one songs ==
Key

† – Billboard year-end number-one song
↑ – Return of a song to number one

Song	Artist(s)	Reached number one	Weeks at number one	Ref.
"Orphans"	Coldplay	December 21, 2019	4	
"Dissolve"	Absofacto	January 18, 2020	2	
"Running Up That Hill"	Meg Myers	February 1, 2020	2	
"Might Be Right"	White Reaper	February 15, 2020	1	
"Everything I Wanted"	Billie Eilish	February 22, 2020	3	
"Novocaine"	The Unlikely Candidates	March 14, 2020	2	
"Cradles"	Sub Urban	March 28, 2020	1	
"Everything I Wanted" ↑	Billie Eilish	April 4, 2020	2	
"Oh Yeah!"	Green Day	April 18, 2020	1	
"Caution"	The Killers	April 25, 2020	2	
"Level of Concern" †	Twenty One Pilots	May 9, 2020	14	
"Honeybee"	The Head and the Heart	August 15, 2020	1	
"Hero"	Weezer	August 22, 2020	1	
"Hallucinogenics"	Matt Maeson	August 29, 2020	3	
"Monsters" †	All Time Low featuring Blackbear	September 19, 2020	17	
"Leave Me Alone"	I Dont Know How but They Found Me	January 16, 2021	1	
"Monsters" ↑ †	All Time Low featuring Blackbear	January 23, 2021	1	
"Fire for You"	Cannons	January 30, 2021	1	
"Therefore I Am"	Billie Eilish	February 6, 2021	1	
"Skin and Bones"	Cage the Elephant	February 13, 2021	4	
"My Ex's Best Friend"	Machine Gun Kelly featuring Blackbear	March 13, 2021	1	
"Heat Waves"	Glass Animals	March 20, 2021	3	
"My Ex's Best Friend" ↑	Machine Gun Kelly featuring Blackbear	April 10, 2021	2	
"Follow You"	Imagine Dragons	April 24, 2021	1	
"Shy Away"	Twenty One Pilots	May 1, 2021	8	
"Follow You" ↑	Imagine Dragons	June 26, 2021	4	
"All My Favorite Songs"	Weezer	July 24, 2021	4	
"We Are Between"	Modest Mouse	August 21, 2021	2	
"Saturday"	Twenty One Pilots	September 4, 2021	5	
"Beggin'"	Måneskin	October 9, 2021	11	
"Brightside"	The Lumineers	December 25, 2021	4	
"The Outside"	Twenty One Pilots	January 22, 2022	3	
"Enemy" †	Imagine Dragons and JID	February 12, 2022	7	
"Black Summer"	Red Hot Chili Peppers	April 2, 2022	4	
"Enemy" ↑ †	Imagine Dragons and JID	April 30, 2022	2	
"Wild Child"	The Black Keys	May 14, 2022	2	
"Love Brand New"	Bob Moses	May 28, 2022	3	
"A Little Bit of Love"	Weezer	June 18, 2022	2	
"Toxic"	BoyWithUke	July 2, 2022	1	
"Viva Las Vengeance"	Panic! at the Disco	July 9, 2022	3	
"Supermodel"	Måneskin	July 30, 2022	5	
"Boy"	The Killers	September 3, 2022	6	
"Tippa My Tongue"	Red Hot Chili Peppers	October 15, 2022	1	
"Here to Forever"	Death Cab for Cutie	October 22, 2022	1	
"Sex, Drugs, Etc."	Beach Weather	October 29, 2022	1	
"Edging"	Blink-182	November 5, 2022	13	
"This Is Why"	Paramore	February 4, 2023	1	
"Sleepwalking"	All Time Low	February 11, 2023	2	
"Records"	Weezer	February 25, 2023	1	
"Love from the Other Side"	Fall Out Boy	March 4, 2023	3	
"Lost" †	Linkin Park	March 25, 2023	3	
"Love from the Other Side" ↑	Fall Out Boy	April 15, 2023	3	
"Lost" ↑ †	Linkin Park	May 6, 2023	3	
"Rescued"	Foo Fighters	May 27, 2023	10	
"Emergency Contact"	Pierce the Veil	August 5, 2023	1	
"Rescue Me"	Dirty Heads	August 12, 2023	4	
"Just Pretend"	Bad Omens	September 9, 2023	1	
"Dial Drunk"	Noah Kahan and Post Malone	September 16, 2023	2	
"Under You"	Foo Fighters	September 30, 2023	3	
"One More Time"	Blink-182	October 21, 2023	20	
"Landmines" †	Sum 41	March 9, 2024	2	
"Beautiful People (Stay High)"	The Black Keys	March 23, 2024	2	
"Neon Pill"	Cage the Elephant	April 6, 2024	4	
"Dilemma"	Green Day	May 4, 2024	8	
"Too Sweet" † (2025)	Hozier	June 29, 2024	11	
"Rainbow"	Cage the Elephant	September 14, 2024	2	
"Stargazing"	Myles Smith	September 28, 2024	1	
"The Emptiness Machine"	Linkin Park	October 5, 2024	5	
"That's How I'm Feeling"	Jack White	November 9, 2024	3	
"Dopamine"	Sum 41	November 30, 2024	1	
"Sad in Carolina"	Dexter and the Moonrocks	December 7, 2024	8	
"Can't Slow Down"	Almost Monday	February 1, 2025	2	
"The Line"	Twenty One Pilots	February 15, 2025	3	
"Neverender"	Justice featuring Tame Impala	March 8, 2025	1	
"Same Old Song"	The Lumineers	March 15, 2025	2	
"So Cold"	Balu Brigada	March 29, 2025	1	
"Messy"	Lola Young	April 5, 2025	1	
"Metaverse"	Cage the Elephant	April 12, 2025	2	
"Rushmere"	Mumford & Sons	April 26, 2025	2	
"The Night Before"	The Black Keys	May 10, 2025	2	
"God Needs the Devil"	Jonah Kagen	May 24, 2025	1	
"Up from the Bottom"	Linkin Park	May 31, 2025	2	
"Back to Friends"	Sombr	June 14, 2025	5	
"Nice to Meet You"	Myles Smith	July 19, 2025	1	
"Basic Being Basic"	Djo	July 26, 2025	1	
"The Contract"	Twenty One Pilots	August 2, 2025	2	
"Never Enough"	Turnstile	August 16, 2025	2	
"Better Days"	Yellowcard	August 30, 2025	3	
"Ensenada"	Sublime	September 20, 2025	8	
"So Far So Fake"	Pierce the Veil	November 15, 2025	3	
"The Weather"	All Time Low	December 6, 2025	2	
"City Walls"	Twenty One Pilots	December 20, 2025	1	
"Downstairs"	Matt Maeson	December 27, 2025	4	
"Get the Message"	The Paradox	January 24, 2026	2	
"Dracula"	Tame Impala	February 7, 2026	2	
"Zombie"	Yungblud	February 21, 2026	2	
"The Great Divide"	Noah Kahan	March 7, 2026	6	
"Doubletake"	Edgehill	April 18, 2026	2	
"Drag Path"	Twenty One Pilots	May 2, 2026	1	
"Bedroom Posters"	Yellowcard featuring Good Charlotte	May 9, 2026	2	
"Different Kind of Love"	Young the Giant	May 23, 2026	1	
"Until the Sun Explodes"	Sublime	May 30, 2026	3	
"Freakin' Out"	Dexter and the Moonrocks	June 20, 2026	5	
"Self Aware"	Temper City	July 25, 2026	8	
"Beaches in Tennessee"	Cage the Elephant	September 19, 2026	4	
"Self Aware" ↑	Temper City	October 17, 2026	2	
"We Might as Well Be Strangers"	Weezer featuring Wednesday	October 31, 2026	3	
"Babydoll"	Dominic Fike	November 21, 2026	1	
