= Razzmatazz B-Sides =

EP by I Dont Know How but They Found Me
- Released: June 12, 2021
- Recorded: 2018–2021
- Genre: Alternative rock; synth-pop; funk; jazz
- Length: 20:23
- Label: Fearless Records
- Producer: Dallon Weekes; Tim Pagnotta

I Dont Know How but They Found Me chronology
Razzmatazz (2020)	Razzmatazz B-Sides (2021)	Gloom Division (2024)

Razzmatazz B-Sides is the third extended play by American rock duo I Dont Know How but They Found Me. It features scrapped songs, demos, and alternate recordings of their debut studio album Razzmatazz (2020), as well as the album's lead single "Leave Me Alone". It was released through Fearless Records exclusively on vinyl for Record Store Day on June 12, 2021.

== Background ==
On August 18, 2017, I Dont Know How but They Found Me released their debut single "Modern Day Cain". Created by lead singer and bassist Dallon Weekes with drummer Ryan Seaman, the new wave band's formation led the former to leave Panic! at the Disco in December 2017 and pursue his new project. That same year, the duo began performing another song in setlists: "Mr. Sinister". Although Weekes described it as the least-favorite song he wrote, it became a favorite among fans. He later changed the title to "Mx. Sinister", allowing the song's obsessive narrative to be about anyone.

Following the release of their debut EP, 1981 Extended Play (2018), IDKHow amassed a large fanbase. Headlining tours became commercially viable for them, but the duo's discography was too short to fill a standard show time. They chose to include various covers in their sets, primarily of songs written by Weekes with the Brobecks. Another cover among these was of Beck's song "Debra", chosen for his connection to it and a desire to perform its exaggerated falsetto.

== Writing and production ==
Inspired by a horror movie director's interview, Weekes wrote ambiguous lyrics for "Mx. Sinister" to let listeners' imaginations create eerie tension. He additionally found its prolonged release to benefit the song's production, allowing further development for its final studio recording. It sonically focuses on distorted bass and synthesizer, described by Desh Kapur of All Music Magazine as dreamy and dynamic. After establishing a new songwriting method, Weekes felt detached from "Modern Day Cain" for its resemblance to his work with Panic! at the Disco. The duo subsequently recorded a new version subtitled "(Slow Jam version)", releasing a music video for it on YouTube.

Shortly after the formation of IDKHow, Weekes shared the concept of "From the Gallows" with Seaman. They created a jazz ballad song inspired by the film Logan's Run (1976) and the songwriting of 1930s swing group the Ink Spots, focusing on minimalistic piano instrumentation with barbershop harmonies. The duo presented this demo to producer Tim Pagnotta, who suggested that they deconstruct it and start over. They then re-recorded it to align with other songs on their debut studio album, Razzmatazz (2020), retrospectively comparing the final version to music by Lawrence Welk.

In 2020, "Leave Me Alone" was released as the lead single of Razzmatazz. The song's commercial success led them to perform it on television multiple times, additionally recording an acoustic piano version as a promotional single in 2021. A studio version of "Debra" was recorded after, and released as a single on February 25. The cover retains a similar structure to the original version, following its funk style. The duo additionally published a performance video for it to YouTube on the same day.

== Release ==
On April 7, 2021, IDKHow announced Razzmatazz B-Sides as part of Record Store Day 2021. The EP was announced to be limited to 2,000 copies and pressed onto a 10" picture disc LP. On June 9, the band teased "Mx. Sinister" via Twitter, releasing it as a single on June 11. On June 12, the EP released through Fearless Records. Four of its six songs were available as digital singles upon release, while two were exclusive to the vinyl: "Modern Day Cain" (Slow Jam version) and "From the Gallows" (Demo). These two later appeared as bonus tracks of Razzmatazz's digital deluxe edition, released on November 19.

== Track listing ==
All tracks are written and produced by Dallon Weekes, except where noted.

Side one
No.	Title	Producer(s)	Length
1.	"Mx. Sinister"		3:02
2.	"Modern Day Cain" (Slow Jam version)		2:58
3.	"Leave Me Alone"	Tim Pagnotta	3:44
Total length:			9:44

Side two
No.	Title	Writer(s)	Length
1.	"Debra" (Beck cover)	Beck Hansen; Ed Green; John King; Michael Simpson	4:36
2.	"From the Gallows" (Demo)		2:31
3.	"Leave Me Alone" (Piano version)		3:32
Total length:			10:39

== Personnel ==
Credits adapted from Tidal.

I Dont Know How but They Found Me

- Dallon Weekes – lead vocals (all tracks), bass guitar (1, 3–5), keyboard (1, 3, 4, 5), piano (5, 6), glockenspiel (5)
- Ryan Seaman – drums (1–4), percussion (5)

Additional musicians

- James Gallardo – double bass (2)
- Wyatt Wakefield – piano (2)
- Pete Schroeder III – spoken word (2)
- Doug Kessinger – background vocals (2)
- Milan Vrajich – background vocals (2)
- Ian Walsh – guitar (3)
- Mikel Ross – guitar (4)
- Matt Appleton – horns (4)

Technical

- Dallon Weekes – recording engineer (1, 2, 4–6), production (1, 2, 4–6), mixing engineer (1, 2, 5, 6), programming (1, 4)
- Michelle Mancini – mastering engineer
- Jed Jones – mixing engineer (1, 4)
- Tyler Tedeschi – engineer (2)
- Tim Pagnotta – recording engineer, production, mixing engineer, recording producer (3)
- Brian Phillips – recording engineer, mixing engineer (3)
- Taylor Reyes – assistant engineer (3)

== Charts ==
Chart performance for Razzmatazz B-Sides
Chart (2021)	Peak position
UK Independent Album Breakers (OCC)	20
US Top Current Album Sales (Billboard)	91
