= Social Climb =

2018 song by I Dont Know How but They Found Me

- Lyric booklet page

Song by I Dont Know How but They Found Me

from the EP 1981 Extended Play
- Released: November 9, 2018
- Genre: Alternative rock; art-pop; new wave
- Length: 2:56
- Label: Fearless Records
- Songwriter: Dallon Weekes
- Producers: Dallon Weekes; Jason Hill

Music video
- "Social Climb" on YouTube

"Social Climb" is a song by American rock duo I Dont Know How but They Found Me. It appears as the third track on their debut EP, 1981 Extended Play, released through Fearless Records on November 9, 2018. The song was written by bassist and vocalist Dallon Weekes and co-produced with Jason Hill. On August 8, 2019, a music video filmed at the Alfred McCune Home was published for the track, symbolizing feeling alone in a crowd.

== Background ==
Following a decade of living in Los Angeles, Dallon Weekes felt isolated amidst an energetic life in the city. He started writing a song with the theme, finishing it in 2017 as "Social Climb" and performing it live thereafter with drummer Ryan Seaman as I Dont Know How but They Found Me. The song begins with a central synth melody, built around by Weekes' vocals and alternative rock instrumentation. It lyrically advocates for maintaining independence and fighting toxic influences. The track released as part of 1981 Extended Play on November 9. Sophie Walker of DIY compared the song's to Fall Out Boy's work, highlighting "chant-worthy choruses, thunderous drum beats and arena-tailored hooks". Anna Rose of Hysteria Magazine was enticed by its varied sound and debauched lyricism, classing it with music used in the animated sitcom Rick and Morty. Weekes called it his favorite track of the EP, particularly for the equipment used on it by co-producer Jason Hill.

== Music video ==
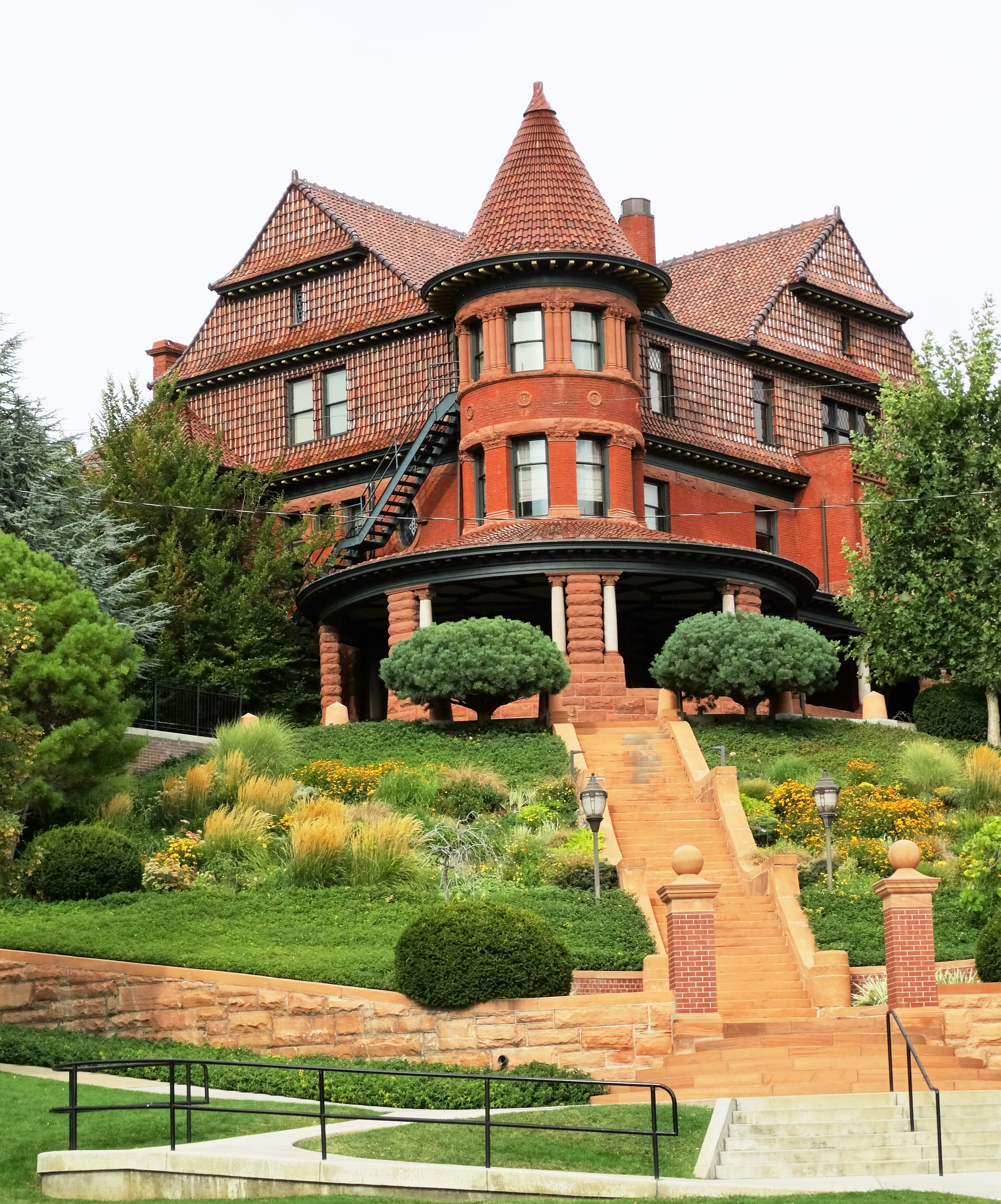
The Alfred McCune Home was used to film the music video for "Social Climb".

On August 8, 2019, a music video for "Social Climb" premiered on YouTube at midnight EST, teased the day before via Instagram. The video features Weekes and Seaman wandering a mansion surrounded apathetic partygoers, performing the song among them. The duo later participates in activities such as a séance and viewing various talents. Intermittently, fictitious information appears as on-screen text. As the video ends, a phone number for the Harvard sentences is displayed. Collin Goeman of Alternative Press likened this to a "70s-era mystery film", while Carly Tagendye of Heart Eyes Magazine compared it to sets from American Horror Story.

The video was directed by Christian Jacobs and filmed at the Alfred McCune Home in Salt Lake City, Utah. Due to time constraints, it was recorded across eight hours instead of the duo's typical two-day schedule. Resources were additionally limited, so they opted to use modern equipment instead of the older technology presented in I Dont Know How but They Found Me's previous videos. To compensate, various filters are used to make the footage appear dated. Weekes took inspiration from the film The Shining (1980) for the video's location and style, while his wife, Breezy Douglas-Weekes, did casting. The cast attendees acted lifeless to mimic feeling alone while surrounded by people, representing the song's meaning.

== Personnel ==
Credits adapted from the EP's liner notes.

- Dallon Weekes – lead vocals, instruments, production
- Ryan Seaman – drums
- Matt Appleton – horns
- Jason Hill – production
- WZRD BLD – mixing engineer
- Michelle Mancini – mastering engineer
