= New Invention =

New Invention may refer to:

== Places ==
- New Invention, Shropshire, a village in South Shropshire, England.
- New Invention, Willenhall, a suburban village of Willenhall in the Metropolitan Borough of Walsall, England.

== Music ==
- "New Invention" (song), by I Dont Know How But They Found Me
