= Rádio – Top 100 (Slovakia) =

Slovakia's national airplay chart

Rádio – Top 100 (originally Rádio Top 100 Oficiálna) is the Slovak national airplay chart published by the IFPI Czech Republic on a weekly basis since the cancellation of the Slovak national section (SNS IFPI) on December 31, 2009. Besides the Top 100 record chart, also the component Rádio Top 50 is effective, featuring exclusively song releases by Slovak and/or Czech artists. Online versions of the charts are released at ifpicr.cz/hitparada/40, featuring Top 100, respectively Top 50 positions.

As of the issue dated November 16, 2026 the current number-one single on the chart is "Self Aware" by Temper City.

== List of number-one songs ==
- List of number-one songs (Slovakia)

== See also ==
- Czech Rádio – Top 100 airplay chart
