= List of Billboard number-one alternative hits =

This is a list of number-one alternative hits as recorded by Billboard's Alternative Airplay chart—a weekly national survey of popular songs on U.S. modern rock radio stations.

The Alternative Airplay chart is based solely on radio airplay. As of 2006, approximately eighty radio stations are electronically monitored twenty-four hours a day and seven days a week by Nielsen Broadcast Data Systems. Songs are ranked by a calculation of the total number of spins per week with its "audience impression", which is based upon exact times of airplay and each station's Arbitron listener data.

== Lists of number-one songs ==
- 1980s
- 1990s
- 2000s
- 2010s
- 2020s
