= New Invention (song) =

2020 single by I Dont Know How but They Found Me

Single by I Dont Know How but They Found Me

from the album Razzmatazz
- Released: October 2, 2020
- Recorded: February 2020
- Genre: Alternative rock; power pop; dance-pop
- Length: 3:11; 3:51 (physical)
- Label: Fearless
- Songwriters: Dallon Weekes; Chad Walsh; David Walsh; Tim Pagnotta
- Producer: Tim Pagnotta

I Dont Know How but They Found Me singles chronology
"Razzmatazz" (2020)	"New Invention" (2020)	"Lights Go Down" (2020)

Lyric video
- "New Invention" on YouTube

"New Invention" is a song by American rock duo I Dont Know How but They Found Me. It was released through Fearless Records on October 2, 2020, as the third single for their debut studio album, Razzmatazz (2020). The song was written by bassist and vocalist Dallon Weekes, Chad Walsh, David Walsh, and Tim Pagnotta, with production by the latter. Lyrically, it explores themes of anxiety and belonging, complemented by a bass-driven, synth-heavy power pop sound consistent with their base alternative rock style.

A lyric video was released alongside the single, featuring the duo interacting with an old supercomputer on the same set of "Leave Me Alone". Following its release, the song gained traction, charting at number 27 on Billboard's Alternative Airplay chart and achieving virality on TikTok in Australia. Other renditions of "New Invention" were released throughout 2021, including a remix featuring Tessa Violet and a live performance.

== Production ==
In February 2020, I Dont Know How but They Found Me began recording sessions for their debut studio album Razzmatazz (2020). With limited time available, bassist and vocalist Dallon Weekes began stressing that later scheduled tracks would have incomplete lyricism and composition. He began writing a song during and inspired by the experience, lyrically tackling his struggles with anxiety and belonging to create "New Invention". He additionally interpreted his recent nightmares and included references to the songs "Choke" and "Leave Me Alone". After completion, Weekes worked with musician Fisch Loops to create a transition track for physical releases, titled "Space Force". Primarily consisting of samples, its experimental production was inspired by the work of composer Raymond Scott.

== Release ==
On October 1, the band announced that Razzmatazz would be delayed a week from its original release date of October 16 due to the COVID-19 pandemic. As compensation for the delay, "New Invention" was released as a single on October 2, alongside a lyric video. The album later released on October 23, featuring the song as its fourth track. Since its release, "New Invention" has become the second-most streamed song of Razzmatazz, behind "Leave Me Alone". The track later went viral in Australia via TikTok, commercially boosting it. The song additionally received radio airplay on stations such as WAQX-FM, leading it to peak at number 27 on Billboard's Alternative Airplay chart.

On June 4, 2021, the duo released a live recording of "New Invention" subtitled "(Clubhouse Session)", additionally publishing the performance as a music video. Later in 2021, I Dont Know How but They Found Me began teasing a collaboration for a new version of the song, later to be revealed with Tessa Violet. The new rendition was released on November 5, featuring piano, a choir, and vocals co-led by Violet on top of the original track. While recording her parts, Violet interpreted her voice as changing the song's narrative into a conversation format. On November 19, 2021, the duo released a digital deluxe version of Razzmatazz. It featured Tessa Violet's remix of "New Invention" as a bonus track, additionally including an electronic remix of the song by Fisch Loops.

== Reception ==
Jack Rogers of Rock Sound complimented the dually modern and vintage aesthetic of "New Invention", likening it to Kraftwerk and Gary Numan's music. Danielle Tierney of Raider Reader named the bass and harmonies of "New Invention" as highlights, commending their distinct and abundant sound. Tatiana Whybrow of Melodic Magazine similarly praised its anthemic bass and vocal performance, while Katie Conway-Flood of Bring the Noise lauded Ryan Seaman's drumming and the burst of energy within each chorus. Jennifer Dill of Second Society Report described its synthesizer as catchy and groovy, comparing the song to 80s music. Kelsey Trevan of Wall of Sound compared the song to the soundtrack of the film 10 Things I Hate About You (1999), enjoying its funk component and citing the track as a favorite.

== Lyric video ==
On October 2, 2020, a lyric video directed by Raúl Gonzo was released for "New Invention", accompanying the single. In it, Weekes sings while wearing a helmet of old electronics. Seaman paces around him interacting with technology, with various videos on TV screens. The camera remains still throughout, shot in a singular take. After filming the music video for "Leave Me Alone", the duo had several spare hours on the set, leading them to film the lyric video for "New Invention" due to the two songs sharing technological themes.

== Track listings ==
"New Invention" streaming single

1. "New Invention" – 3:11

"New Invention" (Clubhouse Session) streaming single

1. "New Invention" (Clubhouse Session) – 3:13
2. "New Invention" – 3:11

"New Invention" [Feat. Tessa Violet] streaming single

1. "New Invention" (featuring Tessa Violet) – 3:11
2. "New Invention" – 3:11

Razzmatazz digital deluxe edition bonus tracks

13. "New Invention" (featuring Tessa Violet) – 3:11
16. "New Invention" (Fisch Loops Remix) – 3:06

== Personnel ==
I Dont Know How but They Found Me

- Dallon Weekes – lead vocals, bass guitar, (Note: All versions) synthesizer, (Note: All versions except "New Invention" (Clubhouse Session)) "Space Force" outro, (Note: "New Invention" only) production, recording producer (Note: "New Invention" (Clubhouse Session) only)
- Ryan Seaman – drums

Additional musicians

- Tessa Violet – lead vocals (Note: "New Invention" (featuring Tessa Violet) only)
- Ian Walsh – guitar
- Anthony Purpura – guitar
- Bri Ray – choir (Note: "New Invention" (Clubhouse Session) and "New Invention" (featuring Tessa Violet) only)
- Oyoyo Joi Bonner – choir
- Raven Flowers – choir
- Fisch Loops – "Space Force" outro

Technical

- Tim Pagnotta – recording engineer, production, mixing engineer, (Note: "New Invention" and "New Invention" (featuring Tessa Violet) only) recording producer
- Brian Phillips – recording engineer, mixing engineer
- Michelle Mancini – mastering engineer, recording producer
- Johann Meyer – mastering engineer, mixing engineer
- Andy Patterson – mastering engineer, mixing engineer (Note: "New Invention" (Fisch Loops Remix) only)
- Eric Stoddard – recording engineer
- Taylor Reyes – assistant engineer
- Fisch Loops – production, remixer, mixing engineer, recording producer

== Charts ==
Chart performance for "New Invention"
Chart (2021)	Peak position
US Alternative Airplay (Billboard)	27
