= Bleed Magic =

2018 song by I Dont Know How but They Found Me

Single by I Dont Know How but They Found Me

from the EP 1981 Extended Play
- Released: October 26, 2018
- Genre: Alternative rock; art-pop; electropop
- Length: 3:23
- Label: Fearless Records
- Songwriters: Dallon Weekes; David Pramik; WZRD BLD
- Producers: Dallon Weekes; David Pramik; WZRD BLD

I Dont Know How but They Found Me singles chronology
"Do It All the Time" (2018)	"Bleed Magic" (2018)	"Leave Me Alone" (2020)

Lyric video
- "Bleed Magic" on YouTube

"Bleed Magic" is a song by American rock duo I Dont Know How but They Found Me. It was released through Fearless Records on October 26, 2018, as the third and final single for their debut EP 1981 Extended Play (2018). The song was written and produced by bassist and vocalist Dallon Weekes with David Pramik and WZRD BLD. The song discusses preying on Hollywood celebrities with an upbeat soundscape to offset it and was positively received upon release.

== Production ==
In 2018, Dallon Weekes began writing a song about a stalker attempting to obtain magical blood from a victim, metaphorically representing agencies preying on talents in Hollywood. Simultaneously, Weekes began composing a pick bassline inspired by the guitarwork of Robert Sledge and Matt Sharp. Evolving around it, he began to create a juxtapositioning sound with the lyrics, additionally using breathing noises inspired by Louis XIV's music. He later asked the band for permission once discovering that he had recreated a beat by them, and received approval. Weekes named the song "Bleed Magic" after finishing its lyrics, and then attached a slow instrumental ending to the song to help it flow with the EP.

On October 16, 2018, I Dont Know How but They Found Me performed live at the Hotel Café in Hollywood. After the concert, the duo discovered that all of their equipment had been stolen from their hotel room. Totaling over $10,000 ($12,821 in 2025), this included Weekes' laptop and backups, resulting in song files being lost. An image of a possible suspect was released the next morning, who was later apprehended with some of the equipment such as the backups still in his possession Subsequently, the band continued work on "Bleed Magic", finishing it soon after. Weekes' recent sinus surgery led him to sing a line wrong, but the song had since been submitted to Fearless Records and was unable to be fixed once noticed.

== Release ==
"Bleed Magic" was released as the third single of 1981 Extended Play (2018) on October 26 through Fearless Records, following "Choke" and "Do It All the Time". A lyric video was published alongside it, visualizing the song's waveforms as bars. The track saw its live debut in November during a tour in support of the EP, being saved for the occasion alongside "Absinthe". Anna Rose of Hysteria Magazine reminisced it to Weekes' work with the band Panic! at the Disco, calling it a standout track for its synth and beat patterns. Juan Delgado of DOD Magazine highlighted the song's use of rhythmic breathing as innovative, while Emily Swingle of Bittersweet Press likened the song's vocals to the Hoosiers' style, additionally praising Ryan Seaman's consistent drumming and audibility.

== Personnel ==
Credits adapted from the EP's liner notes.

- Dallon Weekes – lead vocals, instruments, production
- Ryan Seaman – drums
- David Pramik – production
- WZRD BLD – production, mixing engineer
- Michelle Mancini – mastering engineer
