= Rainbow (Cage the Elephant song) =

2024 song by Cage the Elephant

Single by Cage The Elephant

from the album Neon Pill
- Released: May 17, 2024
- Recorded: 2023
- Genre: Alternative rock
- Length: 3:17
- Label: RCA
- Songwriter: Cage The Elephant
- Producer: John Hill

Cage The Elephant singles chronology
"Metaverse" (2024)	"Rainbow" (2024)	"Beaches in Tennessee" (2026)

"Rainbow" is a song by American alternative rock band Cage The Elephant. It comes off their sixth studio album Neon Pill. The song was accompanied with an official lyric video upon release. It became the bands 12th song to reach number one on the US Alternative Airplay chart, and also reached number one on the US Adult Alternative Airplay chart.

== Background ==
In an interview with Flood Magazine lead singer Matt Shultz spoke on the song stating:

"Rainbow," I believe, was the very first song we wrote, and that song I wrote about my wife. She stuck through me through thick and thin, through everything I went through the past couple of years, and is a tremendously loving person. To call her a hero is an understatement. But sometimes I find the parallels in life between the ones I love and God, and God being love. So it was really this song about the genesis of love and continuously being lifted up by that. It’s one of my favorite songs on the album.

== Reception ==
IHeartRadio wrote "The band begins "Rainbow" with the beat of the drums and then brings in a snazzy guitar strumming before lead singer Matthew Shultz begins to captivate the audience with the lyrics." Arin Chandra of The Daily Cardinal stated the song "offers an uplifting contrast to the darker moments of the album. Its hopeful lyrics remind listeners of the light that can pierce through life’s shadows, making it one of the album’s standout tracks. It also formally introduces Schulz’s struggles with trying to find happiness within his battle with mental health, again contributing to a bittersweet mood throughout the song."

== Live performances ==
Cage the Elephant played the world premiere of the song on Jimmy Kimmel Live on May 9, 2024. On September 5, 2024, Cage the Elephant played "Rainbow" on The Tonight Show Starting Jimmy Fallon, "Rainbow" was also performed at the official IHeartRadio Neon Pill release party celebrations on May 20, 2024.

== Charts ==
Chart (2023)	Peak position
Canada Rock (Billboard)	2
US Hot Rock & Alternative Songs (Billboard)	40
US Alternative Airplay (Billboard)	1
US Adult Alternative Airplay (Billboard)	1
