= Zankou Chicken =

California based fast casual restaurant chain

Coordinates: 34.09839°N 118.300266°W

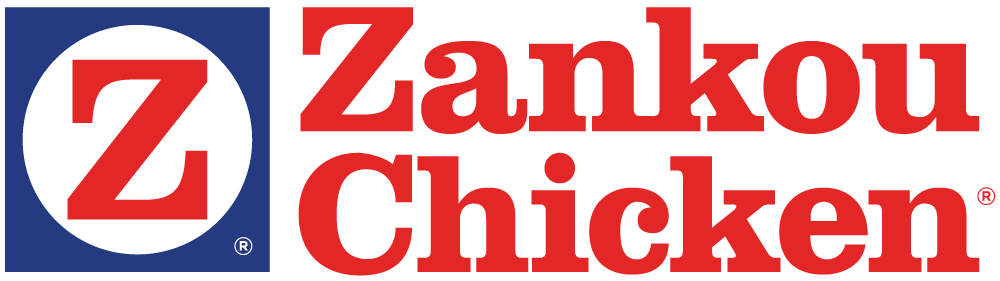

- An order of rotisserie chicken (halved) with cups of garlic sauce
- Type: Private
- Industry: Casual dining restaurant
- Founded: 1962; 64 years ago in Beirut, Lebanon
- Founder: Vartkes Iskenderian
- Headquarters: Vernon, California, U.S.
- Number of locations: 17
- Area served: Los Angeles metropolitan area
- Website: zankouchicken.com zankouchicken.la

Zankou Chicken is the name of 3 family-owned Armenian and Mediterranean fast casual restaurant chains located in the Los Angeles area. The restaurants are especially known for their rotisserie chicken, shawarma, falafel, tahini, and a signature garlic sauce.

All of the locations operated by Rita Iskenderian serve halal-certified chicken, but the Anaheim location, near Little Arabia, also serves halal beef.

== History ==
=== Origin ===
The first Zankou Chicken was opened in 1962 in the Bourj Hammoud neighborhood of Beirut, Lebanon, by Armenian Vartkes Iskenderian and his family. The name "Zankou" comes from a river in Armenia.

After Vartkes Iskenderian's son, Mardiros, was shot over a dispute with a tenant, the family closed the restaurant and fled the Lebanese Civil War.

=== Move to America ===
Mardiros Iskenderian re-established within the United States in 1983, after the family moved to Los Angeles, California. After considering to open a dry cleaning business or selling men's suits, Iskenderian noticed the lack of restaurants catering to the growing Middle Eastern immigrant population in Los Angeles. This included Armenian and Lebanese compatriots who fled Lebanon during the civil war.

The first restaurant in Los Angeles opened in an East Hollywood neighborhood called Little Armenia, and is located at the corner of Sunset Boulevard and Normandie Avenue. The restaurant is especially known for its thick, pasty garlic sauce, created by Iskenderian's wife Markrid, and widely imitated.

In 1991, the family agreed to divide the business when Mardiros wanted to open more locations. The new locations would be owned by Mardiros, while the original Sunset and Normandie location would be owned by his parents and two sisters. Vartkes Iskenderian died the following year.

=== Division of business ===
On January 14, 2003, after a heated argument, Mardiros fatally shot his sister, Dzovig Marjik, and his mother, before fatally shooting himself in a double-murder suicide. Madiros was in the late stages of colon and brain cancer, which is believed to have affected his mental faculties. The repercussions of this event, and the lasting division of the brand into two family factions, impeded the continuing growth of the business despite the restaurants' popularity. In the California Court of Appeal case Iskenderian v. Iskenderian in 2006, Mardiros' widow Rita unsuccessfully sought to attain sole control of the Zankou Chicken trademark.

In 2013, Zankou Chicken was one of the contributors for Green Armenia, which brings attention to environmental problems faced by the people of Armenia.

== Locations ==
Zankou Chicken in Granada Hills

Since opening, Zankou Chicken has expanded throughout the greater Los Angeles area. The restaurant chain's ownership is split into three: one group is operated by Haygan Iskenderian, daughter of founder Vartkes Iskenderian; another group is operated by Rita Iskenderian, wife of Vartkes Iskenderian's late son, Mardiros Iskenderian; and one restaurant is operated by Vartkes Marjik, son of Vartkes Iskenderian's late daughter, Dzovig Marjik.

Starting in East Hollywood, the brand first expanded into other areas with sizable Armenian populations before expanding beyond such areas.

Vartkes Iskenderian's restaurants, now operated by his daughter Haygan Iskenderian:

- Granada Hills
- Little Armenia
- Tarzana
- Thousand Oaks

Mardiros Iskenderian's restaurants, now operated by his widow Rita Iskenderian:

- Anaheim
- Burbank
- Downtown Los Angeles
- Glendale
- Hollywood (branded as "West Hollywood")
- Huntington Beach
- Lawndale (branded as "South Bay")
- Long Beach
- Pasadena
- Toluca Lake (branded as "North Hollywood")
- Valencia
- Van Nuys
- Vernon
- West Los Angeles

Vartkes Marjik's restaurant:

- Montebello

== In popular culture ==
- The restaurant is mentioned by Beck (rhyming "Zankou Chicken" with "ripe for the pickin'") in his song "Debra", from the album Midnite Vultures.
- Zankou Chicken inspired a fictional Palestinian chicken restaurant in Curb Your Enthusiasm, so good that "it could end the rift in the Middle East".
- Zankou Chicken is a subject in Rob Delaney's book Rob Delaney: Mother. Wife. Sister. Human. Warrior. Falcon. Yardstick. Turban. Cabbage.
- Adam Richman of Man v. Food called Zankou Chicken a "can't miss".
- The Zankou Chicken Murders are featured in the 32nd episode of My Favorite Murder
- The music video for Childish Gambino's song "Sober" from his EP Kauai was filmed in the original Hollywood location.
- The restaurant was mentioned in an episode of the talk show Conan.
- Zankou Chicken is mentioned as a directional landmark in an installment of the recurring Saturday Night Live sketch The Californians.

== See also ==
- History of the Armenian Americans in Los Angeles
- List of fast-food chicken restaurants
- List of Lebanese restaurants
