= Vlad Holiday =

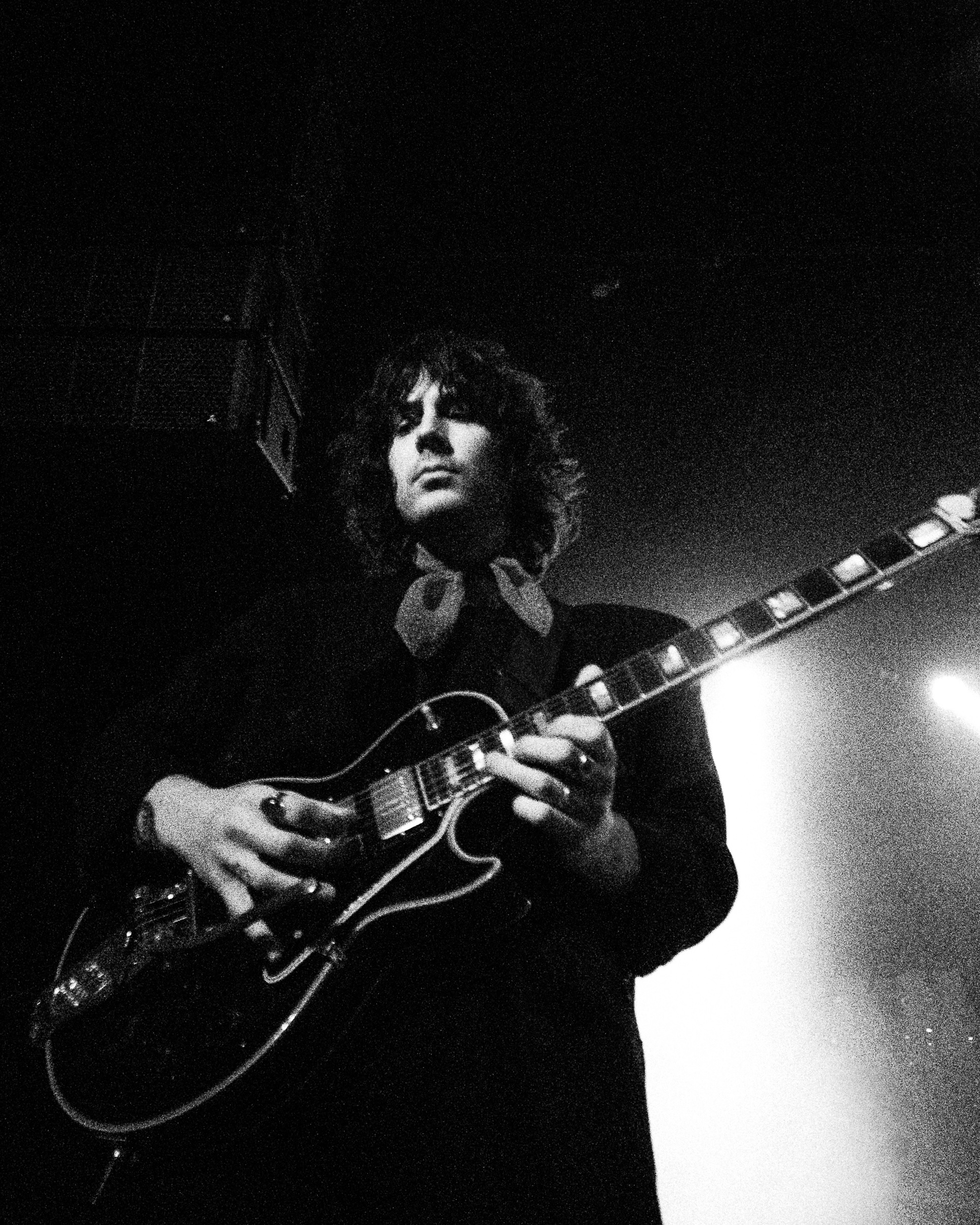

Background information
- Born: May 24, 1989 (age 36); Bucharest, Romania
- Origin: New York City, Nashville, TN
- Genres: Indie; Lo-fi; Alternative; Bedroom pop; Dream pop; Psychedelic rock; New wave revival; Chillwave; Neo Soul; Jazz
- Occupations: Singer, Songwriter, Producer, Musician
- Instruments: Vocals, Guitar, Bass, Drums, Keyboards, Violin, Tape Machine
- Years active: 2017–present

Vlad Holiday (born May 24, 1989) is a Romanian American singer, songwriter, producer, and multi-instrumentalist. He began his solo artist career in 2017 in New York City, blending multiple genres including lo-fi, bedroom pop, psych rock, dream pop and jazz, often over hip-hop-inspired drums. He's also produced and written with other artists, including Cage The Elephant’s Neon Pill, which was nominated for Best Alternative Music Performance at the 67th Annual Grammy Awards. His debut album "My Favorite Drug" saw collaborations with Matt Shultz of Cage The Elephant as well as Kacey Musgraves.

== Early life ==
Holiday was born in Bucharest, Romania, on May 24, 1989, and moved to America with his family in September of 1999. He started as a self-taught guitarist at age 12, and began writing songs shortly after. He spent the majority of his career in New York City, before moving to Nashville, Tennessee, in 2023. Vlad is the grandson of the late Romanian actor Petre Gheorghiu who was a well-known figure in Romanian theatre and film.

== Artist career ==
=== Early singles (2017–2019) ===
Channeling a downtown NYC lo-fi sound, while writing and producing everything by himself at his studio in Greenwich Village, Holiday started releasing songs as they were being written. Deliberately avoiding the pressures of full-length albums, EP's and other music industry constructs at the time, he began releasing singles independently, one by one. On July 28, 2017, Nylon premiered his debut track, "Quit Playing Cool".

His song "So Damn Into You", released July 12, 2019, has gathered over 18 million streams to date. The recording features background vocals by longtime friend and collaborator Charlotte Kemp Muhl.

=== First EP's (2020-2023) ===
Right around the time of the COVID-19 pandemic, on March 27, 2020, Holiday released his debut EP, "Fall Apart With Me," which featured songs like "Phonograph" and "Addiction." Many artists were hurt by releasing music as the pandemic hit since touring was no longer an option. After a few more single-only releases, on November 5, 2021, Holiday released his "Write Me Off The Show" EP, on which he toured a number of times across the US, as well as small club shows in Paris, London and Istanbul.

=== My Favorite Drug (2024-present) ===
On November 15, 2024, Holiday released his debut album "My Favorite Drug." The album features collaborations with Kacey Musgraves and Matt Shultz of Cage The Elephant.

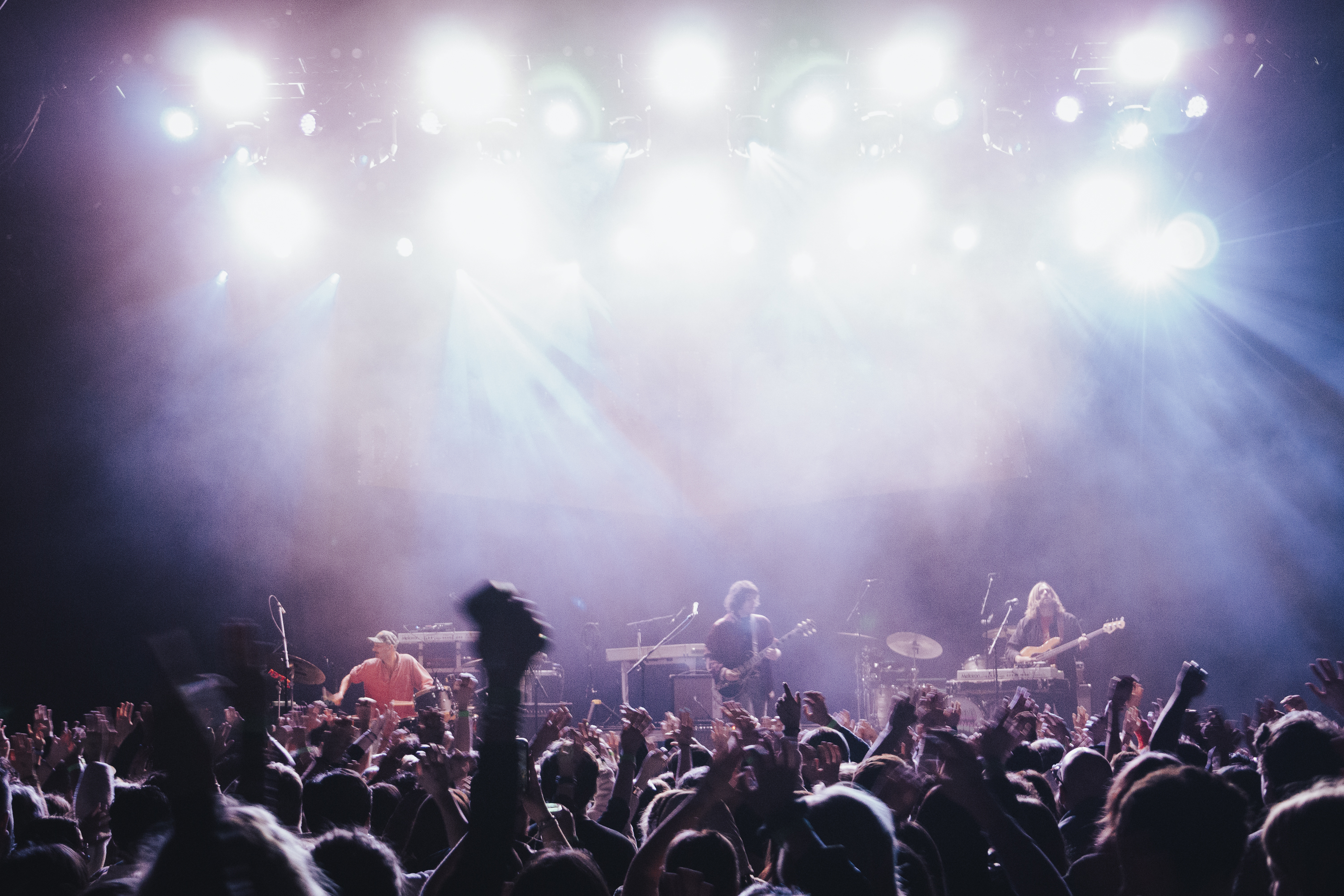
Vlad Holiday crowd 2024

"My Favorite Drug (album)" peaked at No. 9 on the Sub-Modern Albums Radio Chart, while "Closer" peaked at No. 14 at Alternative Specialty Radio.

Holiday supported the album on national tours with Cage The Elephant, Declan McKenna, a festival slot at Austin City Limits 2024, as well as his first headline tours in the US, Canada, Europe and UK.

== Additional Work ==
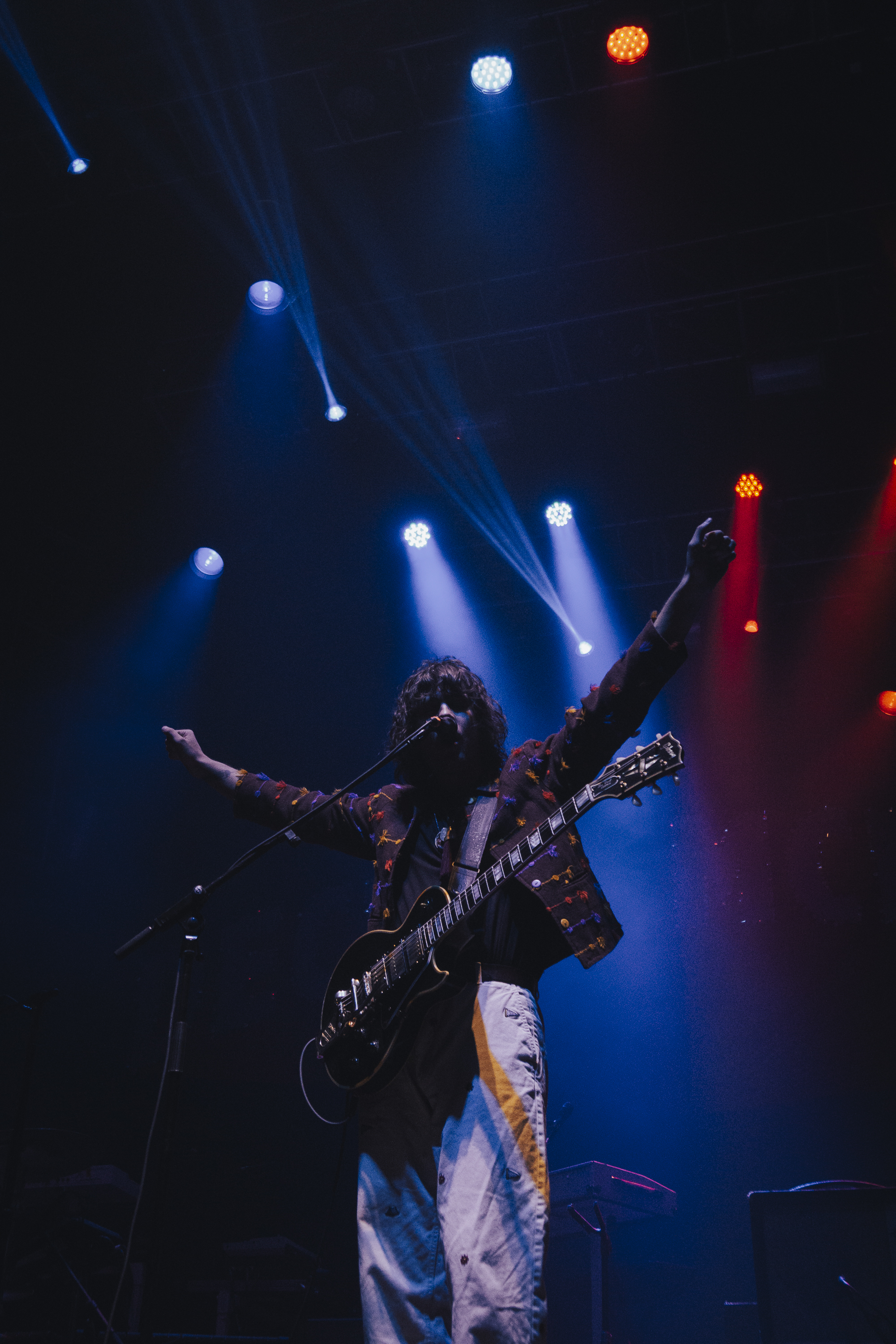
Vlad Holiday live 2024

While finishing his debut album, Holiday was also co-writing a number of songs for Cage The Elephant's album Neon Pill at Electric Lady Studios and Flux Studios in New York City. The title track was nominated for Best Alternative Music Performance at the 67th Annual Grammy Awards. The band also landed their 11th and 13th No. 1 songs on Billboard's Alternative Airplay radio chart with "Neon Pill" and "Metaverse," both Vlad Holiday co-writes.

== Selected Credits ==
Year	Artist	Release	Credits
2024	Vlad Holiday	My Favorite Drug (album)	Producer / engineer / songwriter / vocals / guitar / bass / violin / mellotron / percussion / drums
2024	Vlad Holiday feat. Matt Shultz	Closer (single)	Producer / engineer / songwriter / vocals / guitar / bass / mellotron / percussion
2024	Vlad Holiday feat. Kacey Musgraves	I Don't Wanna Party Anymore (single)	Producer / engineer / songwriter / vocals / guitar / bass / violin / mellotron / percussion / additional drums
2024	Cage the Elephant	Neon Pill (single)	Co-writer, Background Vocals
2024	Cage the Elephant	Metaverse (single)	Co-writer, Background Vocals
2024	Cage the Elephant	Over Your Shoulder (single)	Co-writer
2024	Cage the Elephant	Same (single)	Background Vocals
2023	Vlad Holiday	Downtown Baby (single)	Producer / engineer / mixer / songwriter / vocals / guitar / bass / violin / mellotron / percussion / additional drums
2023	Vlad Holiday	Two Steps Back (single)	Producer / engineer / mixer / songwriter / vocals / nylon acoustic guitar / mellotron
2022	The Brummies	Cosmic Space Girl (single)	Co-writer / additional guitar
2021	Vlad Holiday	Write Me Off The Show (EP)	Producer / engineer / mixer / songwriter / vocals / guitar / bass / drums / mellotron / additional percussion
2021	Sunglasses For Jaws	Everybody's Made Of Bones (album)	Moog bass synth / mellotron / additional guitar / additional bass / additional percussion
2020	Vlad Holiday	I'll Probably Never Be Somebody (single)	Producer / engineer / mixer / songwriter / vocals / guitar / bass / drums / mellotron
2020	Vlad Holiday	Rain (single)	Producer / engineer / mixer / songwriter / vocals / guitar / bass / drums / mellotron / vibes
2020	Vlad Holiday	Fall Apart With Me (EP)	Producer / engineer / mixer / songwriter / vocals / guitar / bass / drums / keyboards
2019	Vlad Holiday	So Damn into You (single)	Producer / engineer / mixer / mastering engineer / songwriter / vocals / guitar / bass / drums / keyboards
2019	Vlad Holiday	Bad Influence (single)	Producer / engineer / mixer / mastering engineer / songwriter / vocals / guitar / bass / drums / keyboards
2018	Elanor Friedberger	Are We Good (Cate Le Bon remix) (single)	Mastering engineer
2018	Vlad Holiday	Like in the Movies (single)	Producer / engineer / mixer / mastering engineer / songwriter / vocals / guitar / bass / drums / keyboards
2018	Vlad Holiday	Obscurity (single)	Producer / engineer / mixer / mastering engineer / songwriter / vocals / guitar / bass / drums / Casio CT-370
2018	Vlad Holiday	Tunnel Vision (single)	Producer / engineer / mixer / mastering engineer / songwriter / vocals / guitar / bass / drums / keyboards
2018	Lissy Trullie	Here (single)	Producer / engineer / mixer / co-writer / guitar / programming
2018	Vlad Holiday	Children (single)	Producer / engineer / mixer / mastering engineer / songwriter / vocals / guitar / bass / drums / keyboards
2018	The Britanys	When I'm With You (single)	Mixing / additional production
2017	Vlad Holiday	Quit Playing Cool (single)	Producer / engineer / mixer / songwriter / vocals / guitar / bass / drums / keyboards
2016	Public Access TV	Never Enough (album)	Producer / engineer on "In Our Blood," "Sudden Emotion," and "Sell You On A Lie"
2015	The Virgins	Rich Girls (single)	TV mix
2015	Donald Cumming	Out Calls Only (album)	Producer / engineer / programming
