= Rainbow Passage =

Test phrases for voice recording

The Rainbow Passage is a speech stimulus text used in safety tests, experiments and transgender voice therapy.

The passage's earliest documented instance, in Voice and Articulation Drillbook (1937), describes it as a Selection for Determination of Habitual Pitch. Grant Merle Fairbanks (1910–1964) was an Assistant Professor of Speech at the State University of Iowa.

The Rainbow Passage is commonly used in respirator fit tests, being specified in OSHA regulations.

== Text ==
When the sunlight strikes raindrops in the air, they act like a prism and form a rainbow. The rainbow is a division of white light into many beautiful colors. These take the shape of a long round arch, with its path high above, and its two ends apparently beyond the horizon. There is, according to legend, a boiling pot of gold at one end. People look, but no one ever finds it. When a man looks for something beyond reach, his friends say he is looking for the pot of gold at the end of the rainbow.

== In popular culture ==
A 2020 documentary by Cadance Bell, The Rainbow Passage, was released by Network 10 and Screen Australia. It details the gender affirmation experiences of three rural Australians, Cadance, Amanda and Hannah.

== See also ==
- Harvard sentences, another test phrase also used in voice training
- Pangram, a sentence which uses every letter of a language's alphabet
