= Do It All the Time =

2018 single by I Dont Know How but They Found Me

Single by I Dont Know How but They Found Me

from the EP 1981 Extended Play
- A-side: "Choke"
- Released: August 24, 2018
- Recorded: July 2018
- Genre: Alternative rock; indie pop; new wave
- Length: 2:47
- Label: Fearless Records
- Songwriters: Dallon Weekes; David Pramik; WZRD BLD; Micah Premnath
- Producers: Dallon Weekes; David Pramik; WZRD BLD

I Dont Know How but They Found Me singles chronology
"Choke" (2017)	"Do It All the Time" (2018)	"Bleed Magic" (2018)

Lyric video
- "Do It All the Time" on YouTube

Music video
- "Do It All the Time" on YouTube

"Do It All the Time" is a song by American rock duo I Dont Know How but They Found Me. It was released on August 24, 2018, as the second single for their debut EP, 1981 Extended Play. The song was written and produced by bassist and vocalist Dallon Weekes, David Pramik, and WZRD BLD, with additional writing by Micah Premnath. The track additionally marked the band's signing with Fearless Records, previously releasing two singles while unsigned.

== Background ==
In 2018, Dallon Weekes began writing a song inspired by Thelema's philosophy of "do what thou wilt". Finding it to be selfish and disregarding others, he attempted to mock songs that advocate for it with a sarcastic mimicry, becoming "Do It All the Time". He recorded the song with Ryan Seaman in July as the duo I Dont Know How but They Found Me, and publicly signed to Fearless Records on August 24, following the success of their singles "Modern Day Cain" and "Choke". Alongside the announcement, "Do It All the Time" was released as a double A-side single with a remastered version of "Choke". They began playing the song live after despite limited rehearsal time, performing five shows in the United Kingdom through the end of August. On November 9, it appeared as the final track of the duo's debut EP 1981 Extended Play (2018). Sophie Walker of DIY highlighted the song's bass and trumpets as funky and thrilling, while Hysteria Magazine described the song as "a send up of the entitled attitude that has permeated our society".

== Music videos ==
Alongside the single's release, a lyric video for "Do It All the Time" was released, showing the lyrics changing color as they're sung with the cover art above it. On October 12, 2018, a music video directed by Raúl Gonzo was released for the song. The video features Weekes and Seaman performing vocals, synthesizer, and drums on an orange backdrop while several mannequins behind them hold brass & woodwind instruments. The song appears programmed, as several instruments are switched on and off with Seaman later using a clipboard and camera to document Weekes' guitar performance. In the video's YouTube description, the band fictionally describes it as a conceptual art piece that had been used in public school curriculums from 1964 to 1984.

== Personnel ==
Credits adapted from the EP's liner notes.

- Dallon Weekes – lead vocals, instruments, production
- Ryan Seaman – drums
- Alex Nauth – horns
- Matt Appleton – horns
- David Pramik – production
- WZRD BLD – production, mixing engineer
- Michelle Mancini – mastering engineer

== Certifications ==
Region	Certification	Certified units/sales
United States (RIAA)	Gold	500,000^{‡}
^{‡} Sales+streaming figures based on certification alone.
