= Razzmatazz (album) =

Studio album by I Dont Know How but They Found Me
- Released: October 23, 2020
- Recorded: 2020 (Note: All tracks except for "Nobody Likes the Opening Band")
- Studios: Pagzilla Sound (North Hollywood, California)
- Genres: Indie pop; new wave; synth-pop; pop rock; alternative rock; electronic rock
- Length: 37:15 (digital); 41:59 (physical)
- Label: Fearless
- Producers: Tim Pagnotta; Dallon Weekes; Brian Phillips

I Dont Know How but They Found Me chronology
Christmas Drag (2019)	Razzmatazz (2020)	Razzmatazz B-Sides (2021)

Singles from Razzmatazz
- 1. "Leave Me Alone" Released: August 5, 2020; 2. "Razzmatazz" Released: September 16, 2020; 3. "New Invention" Released: October 2, 2020; 4. "Lights Go Down" Released: October 14, 2020

Razzmatazz (stylized in all caps; sometimes as RΛZZMΛTΛZZ) is the debut studio album by American musical duo I Dont Know How but They Found Me (often shortened to iDKHOW). It was originally set to be released by Fearless Records on October 16, 2020, but was pushed back to October 23, 2020, due to the COVID-19 pandemic. It is the band's only studio album to feature Ryan Seaman before he was fired in 2023.

== Promotion ==
Over two years prior to the album's release, the song "Nobody Likes The Opening Band" was released as a free download on iDKHOW's website on March 14, 2018, accompanied with a music video. On August 5, 2020, the band released a lyric video for the album's lead single "Leave Me Alone" along with the announcement of the album's title and release date. On September 16, the title track "Razzmatazz" and accompanying lyric video were released. Following a video on October 1 explaining the need to push back the album, the band released the third single "New Invention" the next day alongside a lyric video.

The band continued promoting the album long after release and performed "Leave Me Alone" on Jimmy Kimmel Live! the following January and on The Ellen DeGeneres Show in February. For Record Store Day 2021, the band released Razzmatazz B-Sides as an exclusive picture disc. This EP included one new track: "Mx. Sinister", a cover of "Debra" by Beck, and reimagined versions of "Leave Me Alone" and "Modern Day Cain".

On November 19, the band released Razzmatazz: Deluxe Edition. Included in the bonus tracks were a cover of "Boys Don't Cry" by The Cure, a revision of "New Invention" featuring Tessa Violet, various live performances of tracks from Razzmatazz, and material previously only found on their limited B-Side release.

Starting in mid-2021 the band toured internationally to support the album and were featured in various festivals. The tour was split into two parts: the "Razzmatazzmatour" (late 2021) and "The Thought Reform Tour" (early 2022).

== Critical reception ==
Professional ratings
Aggregate scores
Source	Rating
Metacritic	84/100
Review scores
Source	Rating
AllMusic	4/5 stars
DIY	4/5 stars
Kerrang!	4/5
The Line of Best Fit	8.5/10

Razzmatazz received positive reviews from music critics. On Metacritic, which assigns a normalized rating out of 100 from reviews from critics, the album has an average score of 84, which indicates "universal acclaim" based on 4 reviews. DIY described the album as "melding together '80s synths, baroque piano and pithy, self-deprecating choruses", while adding that it is "fun, flamboyant, and entirely of its time". The Line of Best Fit praised frontman Dallon Weekes' lyricism in the songs "Mad IQs" and "Clusterhug", as well as his bass guitar work in "Sugar Pills" and "New Invention".

== Track listing ==
All tracks are written by Dallon Weekes and produced by Tim Pagnotta, except where noted.

Razzmatazz – Digital edition
No.	Title	Writer(s)	Producer(s)	Length
1.	"Leave Me Alone"			3:35
2.	"Mad IQs"	Weekes; Pagnotta; Brian Phillips	Pagnotta; Phillips	3:02
3.	"Nobody Likes the Opening Band"		Weekes	2:15
4.	"New Invention"	Weekes; Pagnotta; Chad Walsh; David Walsh		3:11
5.	"From the Gallows"			2:42
6.	"Clusterhug"			3:12
7.	"Sugar Pills"	Weekes; Stu Maxfield		3:07
8.	"Kiss Goodnight"			3:50
9.	"Lights Go Down"	Weekes; Jason Hill		3:24
10.	"Need You Here"	Weekes; Andrew Goldstein		3:07
11.	"Door"		Weekes	1:32
12.	"Razzmatazz"	Weekes; Pagnotta; Phillips		4:18
Total length:				37:15

Razzmatazz – Digital deluxe edition bonus tracks
No.	Title	Writer(s)	Producer(s)	Length
13.	"New Invention" (featuring Tessa Violet)	Weekes; Pagnotta; C. Walsh; D. Walsh	Pagnotta	3:11
14.	"Boys Don't Cry" (The Cure cover)	Robert Smith; Lol Tolhurst; Michael Dempsey	Weekes	3:15
15.	"Leave Me Alone" (Live From A TV Studio)	Weekes	Weekes	3:40
16.	"New Invention" (Fisch Loops Remix)	Weekes; Pagnotta; C. Walsh; D. Walsh	Fisch Loops	3:06
17.	"From the Gallows" (Demo)	Weekes	Weekes	2:29
18.	"Modern Day Cain" (Slow Jam version)	Weekes	Weekes	2:58
19.	"Sugar Pills" (Live From London / 2021)	Weekes; Maxfield	Weekes	3:57
Total length:				59:51

Razzmatazz – Physical edition (CD and Vinyl)
No.	Title	Writer(s)	Producer(s)	Length
1.	"Leave Me Alone"			3:44
2.	"Indoctrination"			1:11
3.	"Mad IQs"	Weekes; Pagnotta; Phillips	Pagnotta; Phillips	3:02
4.	"Nobody Likes the Opening Band"		Weekes	2:15
5.	"New Invention"	Weekes; Pagnotta; C. Walsh; D. Walsh		3:51
6.	"From the Gallows"			2:42
7.	"Clusterhug"			3:35
8.	"Sugar Pills"	Weekes; Maxfield		3:33
9.	"Kiss Goodnight"			3:50
10.	"Lights Go Down"	Weekes; Hill		3:43
11.	"Need You Here"	Weekes; Goldstein		3:29
12.	"Door"		Weekes	1:29
13.	"Tomorrow People"			1:19
14.	"Razzmatazz"	Weekes; Pagnotta; Phillips		4:18
Total length:				41:59

== Personnel ==
I Dont Know How but They Found Me

- Dallon Weekes – vocals and bass (all tracks), synthesizer (1, 2, 4–10, 12); piano (3, 9, 10, 12), ukulele (11), production
- Ryan Seaman – drums (except tracks 3 and 11), percussion

Additional personnel

- Ian Walsh – guitar (except tracks 3, 7 and 11)
- Stu Maxfield – guitar (track 7)
- Alex Nauth – trumpet (track 5)
- Matt Appleton – saxophone (track 12)

=== Production ===
- Tim Pagnotta – engineering and production
- Brian Phillips – engineering and production

== Charts ==
Chart performance for Razzmatazz
Chart (2020)	Peak position
Scottish Albums (Official Charts)	35
UK Albums (Official Charts)	87
UK Album Downloads (Official Charts)	33
US Billboard 200	122
US Heatseekers Albums (Billboard)	2
US Independent Albums (Billboard)	26
US Top Alternative Albums (Billboard)	11
US Top Rock Albums (Billboard)	22
US Vinyl Albums (Billboard)	23

== Release history ==
Region	Date	Label	Format	Catalog
Various	October 23, 2020	Fearless	CD, LP, digital download, streaming	FEAR01397
