= Harvard sentences =

Test phrases for voice recording

The Harvard sentences, or Harvard lines, is a collection of 720 sample phrases, divided into lists of 10, used for standardized testing of Voice over IP, cellular, and other telephone systems. They are phonetically balanced sentences that use specific phonemes at the same frequency they appear in English.

Selection of Harvard Sentences used as benchmark for audio companding and file compression
16-bit linear PCM
Original recording using 16 bit integers at 48 ksps, i.e., a bitrate of 768 kb/s

8-bit A-law PCM
Recording companded using the A-Law algorithm, 8 bit samples, 384 kb/s

OPUS at low bitrate
Recording compressed using the Opus codec at a bitrate of 7 kb/s

IEEE Recommended Practice for Speech Quality Measurements sets out seventy-two lists of ten phrases each, described as the "1965 Revised List of Phonetically Balanced Sentences (Harvard Sentences)." They are widely used in research on telecommunications, speech, and acoustics, where standardized and repeatable sequences of speech are needed. The Open Speech Repository provides some freely usable, prerecorded WAV files of Harvard Sentences in American and British English, in male and female voices.

Harvard lines are also used to observe how an actor's mouth can move when they are talking. This can be used when creating more realistic CGI models.

Andrea James has identified Harvard sentences as a useful voice training resource for transgender individuals.

== Sample Harvard sentences ==
The first three lists are as follows:

=== List 1 ===
1. The birch canoe slid on the smooth planks.
2. Glue the sheet to the dark blue background.
3. It's easy to tell the depth of a well.
4. These days a chicken leg is a rare dish.
5. Rice is often served in round bowls.
6. The juice of lemons makes fine punch.
7. The box was thrown beside the parked truck.
8. The hogs were fed chopped corn and garbage.
9. Four hours of steady work faced us.
10. A large size in stockings is hard to sell.

=== List 2 ===
1. The boy was there when the sun rose.
2. A rod is used to catch pink salmon.
3. The source of the huge river is the clear spring.
4. Kick the ball straight and follow through.
5. Help the woman get back to her feet.
6. A pot of tea helps to pass the evening.
7. Smoky fires lack flame and heat.
8. The soft cushion broke the man's fall.
9. The salt breeze came across from the sea.
10. The girl at the booth sold fifty bonds.

=== List 3 ===
1. The small pup gnawed a hole in the sock.
2. The fish twisted and turned on the bent hook.
3. Press the pants and sew a button on the vest.
4. The swan dive was far short of perfect.
5. The beauty of the view stunned the young boy.
6. Two blue fish swam in the tank.
7. Her purse was full of useless trash.
8. The colt reared and threw the tall rider.
9. It snowed, rained, and hailed the same morning.
10. Read verse out loud for pleasure.

== See also ==
- Pangram, a sentence which uses every letter of a language's alphabet
- Rainbow Passage
