= Dexter and the Moonrocks =

American rock band

- Origin: Throckmorton, Texas, U.S.
- Genres: Alternative rock; indie rock; grunge; country rock
- Years active: 2021–present
- Labels: Who's Dexter; Severance; Big Loud
- Members: James Tuffs; Ryan Fox; Ryan Anderson; Ty Anderson
- Website: dexterandthemoonrocks.com

Dexter and the Moonrocks are an American rock band from Throckmorton, Texas formed in 2021. Combining elements of country and rock music, they have described their genre as "Western space grunge", which they chose to name their 2024 EP after. The band gained traction after a clip for their song "Couch" went viral on TikTok. Their song "Freakin' Out" peaked at number 33 on the Billboard Hot 100.

== History ==
=== 2021–2024: Formation and early years ===
James Tuffs had been friends with cousins Ryan and Ty Anderson since they were in 8th grade. After the three of them graduated high school, they all pursued jobs and higher education, until Tuffs' parents entered him into a songwriting contest without him knowing. Although Tuffs did not win, after some encouragement, he decided to form a band with the Andersons. Originally going by the name "James Tuffs and the Southern Trouble", the band would recruit drummer Ryan Fox from an ad online in late 2021 and change their name to Dexter and the Moonrocks. Explaining the name, the band has stated that it was a nod to Hootie & the Blowfish "but with way more drugs"- Drummer Ryan Fox has stated that the "Moonrocks" part of the name is a reference to marijuana.None of the members of the band are named Dexter, with lead singer James Tuffs explaining "I was thinking of something cool. My name is James. And Dexter and the Moonrocks sounds way cooler than James and the Moonrocks. There wasn't much thought put in. It was about that quick".

While various media sources have listed their hometown as being Abilene, they are from rural Throckmorton County, which is 70 miles northeast. By the band's own admission, their hometown has no local music scene to speak of, with Fox stating: "We had to drive like two-and-a-half hours just to get into a scene... and even then they'd pay us 300 bucks and tell us to go fuck off". The band has described early shows before they got signed as being very lightly attended affairs, with Tuffs recalling: "There was one where we showed up... and the only person there is the bartender. That's the one person there. And even the bartender, while we're playing, is like, 'Could you kind of keep it down?'... We booked a show there. We didn't keep it down. So, it was an experience, but those are the shows that you really learn from. It's good for you. We've played many of those".

In 2023, the band signed with Severance Records, an offshoot of Big Loud Records, where they would be the flagship artist. Severance Records was founded by Mike Easterlin and Steve "Stevo" Robertson, both of whom have had careers in bringing rock bands to prominence, with Robertson having signed acts like Paramore and Shinedown to major labels, while Easterlin had done talent development with bands like Blur, the Smashing Pumpkins, and Nickelback. This opportunity meant that the band would have industry veterans promoting them, while also ensuring that they would not be lost in the shuffle of a bigger label. They agreed immediately to the signing.

=== 2024–present: Rise to the mainstream and Friends That I Don't Like ===
In late 2024, Dexter and the Moonrocks began seeing minor success. That December, their song "Sad in Carolina" topped the Billboard Alternative Airplay charts, their first time on any Billboard chart. The next year, the band released the single "Ritalin", which also hit the top 10 on the same radio chart. Outside of alternative rock radio, though, these songs didn't get traction elsewhere. The band themselves have even stated "the radio success didn’t feel like it was moving my personal needle".

The band's proper commercial breakthrough was "Freakin' Out", which became not only their first Billboard Hot 100 entry, but also their first top 40 hit. This rise has been attributed by Severance Records president Steve Robertson to the band's use of social media to promote themselves, saying of the band's drummer Ryan Fox "he understands internet culture better than anyone, as evidenced by the worldwide explosion of 'Freakin' Out'".

As "Freakin' Out" started getting traction in the US, it also started gaining success in the rest of the Anglosphere, hitting the top 40 in Canada, Australia, and New Zealand, as well as scraping onto the charts in the UK. Capitalizing off of this movement, the band was invited to play at Strummingbird Festival 2026, representing not only the first time they had scheduled a show in Australia, but also the first time they played any show outside of North America.

On May 27, 2026, the band released their follow up to "Freakin' Out", "12 Steps", featuring the band Treaty Oak Revival.

While the band originally had no plans for a full record, the success of "Freakin' Out" led to them wanting to capitalize and create a proper debut album. In July, Ryan Fox stated on the Whiskey Riff podcast that the band was working on their debut album, saying that the goal was having it released before the end of the year. That same month, they also dropped a new single, "If You Could Talk". It was also announced that month the band would be playing at Hopscotch Music Festival in Raleigh later that year.

In August 2026, Dexter and the Moonrocks formally announced their debut album, Friends That I Don't Like, with a release date of October 2, 2026. The announcement came with another advanced single, "It's a Lot". On August 20, 2026, the band made their debut on late night TV, playing on The Tonight Show Starring Jimmy Fallon.

Upon release, the Friends That I Don't Like debuted at number 26 on the Billboard Top 200, and it yielded the band's second single to chart on the hot 100, "Why Don't You Say So". That said, the album did not stay on the charts for long, as it fell off the Top 200 after just 5 weeks.

Critically, the album got mixed reviews. In a positive review, the AU Review giving the album 4 out of 5 stars and saying "There are no real low points here, and while I would have loved a little more of the closing track’s energy throughout, the band’s ability to balance grungy rock with more vulnerable moments makes this an incredibly enjoyable listen. I love what these guys are doing, and if this is what they’re capable of on their first album, I can’t wait to see what comes next.". In a negative review, Vice Media gave the album a 2 out of 10, stating "The debut record from this TikTok-friendly Texan four-piece is like being locked in a truck and driven from one side of the Lone Star State to the other with a nonstop soundtrack of Staind, Puddle of Mudd, and Nickelback for company, and nothing to eat but Cheez-Its. It doesn’t take much “western space grunge” to start plotting murder from the passenger seat. After faking a medical episode to make the car stop on the side of Route 1, I’m now going to need you to fuck off into this arid, moonlike landscape before I smash you in the head with this big old rock."

== Styles and influences ==
The band has consistently described their style as "western space grunge". Stated influences include Foo Fighters, Deftones, Blink-182, Nirvana, Zach Bryan, Tyler Childers, Charles Wesley Godwin and the Turnpike Troubadours. The band has also done covers of songs by Black Sabbath, Green Day, Queens of the Stone Age, and Surf Curse, either in the studio or in their live shows.

== Attempted Cheez-Its sponsorship ==
In their live shows, the band has made a ritual of throwing Cheez-Its at their audience due to it being their favorite snack. They did this for their first couple of years in the hopes of getting a sponsorship from the snack company, until Cheez-Its asked them to stop, prompting them to instead start getting their audiences to chant "fuck Cheez-Its".

== Discography ==
=== Albums ===
List of albums, with selected details and peak chart positions shown
Title	Details	Peak chart positions		
Title	Details	US	US Rock	CAN
Friends That I Don't Like	Released: October 2, 2026; Label: Who's Dexter; Formats: CD, digital download, streaming	26	5	58

=== EPs ===
- Dexter and the Moonrocks (2021)
- Western Space Grunge (2024)
- Happy to Be Here (2025)
- Donkey Flats (2025)

=== Singles ===
List of singles, with year released and album name shown
Title	Year	Peak chart positions										Certifications	Album
Title	Year	US	US Alt.	US Rock	AUS	CAN	CAN Rock	IRE	NZ Hot	UK	WW	Certifications	Album
"Sad in Carolina"	2024	—	1	— (Note: "Sad in Carolina" did not enter the Hot Rock & Alternative Songs chart, but peaked at number nine on the Rock & Alternative Airplay chart.)	—	—	10	—	—	—	—		Western Space Grunge
"Ritalin"	2025	—	4	— (Note: "Ritalin" did not enter the Hot Rock & Alternative Songs chart, but peaked at number 25 on the Rock & Alternative Airplay chart.)	—	—	29	—	—	—	—		Happy to Be Here
"Freakin' Out"	2026	33	1	7	30	35	12	84	27	76	86	RIAA: Platinum; RMNZ: Gold	Friends That I Don't Like
"12 Steps" (featuring Treaty Oak Revival)	2026	— (Note: "12 Steps" did not enter the Billboard Hot 100, but peaked at number 14 on the Bubbling Under Hot 100 chart.)	—	25	—	—	—	—	—	—	—		Friends That I Don't Like
"If You Could Talk"	2026	—	—	48	—	—	—	—	—	—	—		Friends That I Don't Like
"It's a Lot"	2026	—	—	46	—	—	—	—	—	—	—		Friends That I Don't Like
"Why Don't You Say So" (featuring Avery Anna)	2026	98	—	23	—	88	—	—	10	—	—		Friends That I Don't Like
"—" denotes a recording that did not chart or was not released in that territory.

== Music videos ==
Year	Title	Director
2023	"Space Invader"	Trent Starks
2024	"For Once"	Michael Herrick
2024	"Messed Up Kid"	Michael Herrick
2025	"Say I..."	Michael Herrick
2025	"Happy to Be Here"	Michael Herrick
2026	"Flavorless"	Ilona Donovan
2026	"Freakin' Out"	Ilona Donovan
2026	"If You Could Talk"	Ilona Donovan, Ryan Fox and Derek Hockemeyer
2026	"It's a Lot"	Ryan Fox
2026	"Why Don't You Say So"	Ryan Fox
