= Nobody Likes the Opening Band =

2018 song by I Dont Know How but They Found Me

Song by I Dont Know How but They Found Me

from the album Razzmatazz
- Released: March 14, 2018
- Genre: Pop rock
- Length: 2:15
- Label: Fearless Records
- Songwriter: Dallon Weekes
- Producer: Dallon Weekes

Music video
- "Nobody Likes the Opening Band" on YouTube

"Nobody Likes the Opening Band" is a song by American rock duo I Dont Know How but They Found Me. It was published as a music video on March 14, 2018, and is their third and final independent release. The song was written and produced by bassist and vocalist Dallon Weekes. It later appeared as the third track on their debut studio album, Razzmatazz, released through Fearless Records on October 23, 2020.

== Background ==
While travelling to one of his first shows as I Dont Know How but They Found Me, bassist and vocalist Dallon Weekes considered the effort required to please his audience without exploiting his previous association with Panic! at the Disco. He began writing a song inspired by the feelings, advocating for the audience to try new things and ease pressure off of opening bands. The song solely consists of piano and a tambourine, focusing on Weekes' high-ranging vocal performance. This was done to make the track minimalistic, as he found that his and Ryan Seaman's traditional instruments of bass and drums weren't fitting for its message. It has a duration of two minutes and fifteen seconds, making it their third-shortest song.

== Release ==
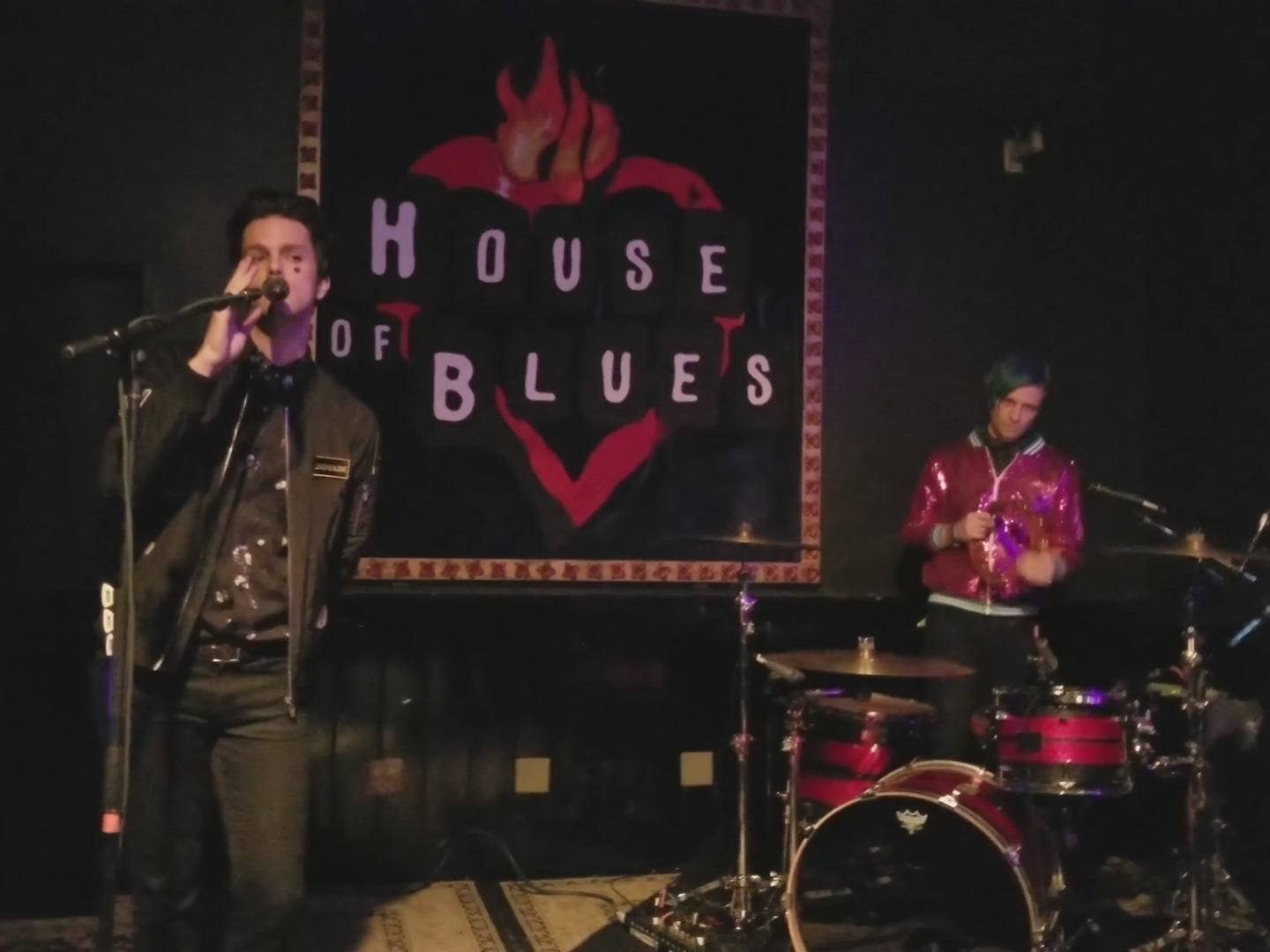
"Nobody Likes the Opening Band" performed live in 2017.

The duo began performing "Nobody Likes the Opening Band" live in 2017, typically opening with the track as an opening band. When headlining concerts, they abstain from playing it unless their opener approves. On March 14, 2018, the song was made available as a free download on the band's website, and a music video for the track directed by Awesome Forces was published to YouTube. The video features the duo performing the song at a talent show, with Ryan Seaman playing percussion and an elderly woman playing piano. After the song ends, the audience pelts Weekes with fruit. Filming was done in a 19th century church in Salt Lake City, Utah, using two modern cameras and an older VHS camcorder. Despite having a music video, "Nobody Likes the Opening Band" had no official release until it appeared as the third track on the band's debut studio album, Razzmatazz. The album was released on October 23, 2020, and distributed through Fearless Records.

== Reception ==
Angie Piccirillo of Ones to Watch complimented the song's "depressing joys" and theatrical elements derived from the minimalism, likening it to Frank Sinatra's style. Tiana Speter of The Soundcheck similarly praised its theatrics as a ballad, additionally highlighting its charming sound and Weekes' vocal range. Danielle Tierney of Raider Reader found the studio recording of "Nobody Likes the Opening Band" to be enjoyable, but found it to lack purpose when compared to the spirit of its live performances. Katie Conway-Flood of Bring the Noise commended the track's succinctness and bittersweet lyricism, appreciating the serious approach to the subject.

== Personnel ==
- Dallon Weekes – lead vocals, piano, production
- Ryan Seaman – tambourine, jingle bell
- Tim Pagnotta – recording engineer, mixing engineer
- Brian Phillips – recording engineer, mixing engineer
- Michelle Mancini – mastering engineer
- Taylor Reyes – assistant engineer
