= Freakin' Out (Dexter and the Moonrocks song) =

2026 single by Dexter and the Moonrocks

Single by Dexter and the Moonrocks

from the album Friends That I Don't Like
- Released: March 11, 2026
- Genre: Alternative rock
- Length: 3:37
- Label: Who's Dexter; Severance; Big Loud
- Songwriters: James Tuffs; Ryan Fox; Ryan Anderson; Ty Anderson
- Producer: Taylor Kimball

Dexter and the Moonrocks singles chronology
"Flavorless" (2026)	"Freakin' Out" (2026)	"12 Steps" (2026)

Music video
- "Freakin' Out" on YouTube

"Freakin' Out" is a single by American rock band Dexter and the Moonrocks, released on March 11, 2026. It is their first song to reach the Billboard Hot 100, debuting at number 91 and peaking at number 33.

== Composition ==
The song incorporates elements of 1990s alternative rock and 2000s pop-punk and emo. It has been described as "sadboi country".

== Critical reception ==
Sam B. of Raised Rowdy gave a positive review, writing that the song "builds exactly the way you want it to, stacking crescendos, booming riffs, and driving rhythms on top of melodies that just don't miss". He additionally remarked, "The lyrics are fantastic as always, hitting that sweet spot between raw and relatable, while the production is absolutely dialed – letting every layer breathe while still packing a punch". Stephen Andrew Galiher of Vice praised the song's sound and energy, commenting that it "hits like a cold garage beer on a Saturday night". On the song's success, Jon Caramanica of The New York Times stated "What it is is very similar to the radio rock of the 2000s – Drugs. Depression. Self-deprecation – that lived comfortably side by side with all the great shiny pop of that era. I wasn't familiar with this band previously, but I went back and dug through a bunch of their old catalog. Turns out they've been writing perfect pop songs for most of the last five years. ...Beautifully structured. Real, robust sense of narrative building into a chorus. Great breakdowns. It's as if they studied with Max Martin. And so the real thing that this has in common with all that great '90s and 2000s rock is, even though there's morbidity in the tone, even though the lyrics are dark, it feels triumphant".

== Charts ==
Chart performance for "Freakin' Out"
Chart (2026)	Peak position
Australia (ARIA)	30
Canada (Canadian Hot 100)	35
Canada Mainstream Rock (Billboard Canada)	10
Canada Modern Rock (Billboard Canada)	13
Global 200 (Billboard)	86
Ireland (IRMA)	84
New Zealand Hot Singles (RMNZ)	27
UK Singles (Official Charts)	76
US Billboard Hot 100	33
US Hot Rock & Alternative Songs (Billboard)	6
US Pop Airplay (Billboard)	34

== Certifications ==
Certifications for "Freakin' Out"
Region	Certification	Certified units/sales
New Zealand (RMNZ)	Gold	15,000^{‡}
United States (RIAA)	Platinum	1,000,000^{‡}
^{‡} Sales+streaming figures based on certification alone.
