= De'Wayne =

American musician, singer and songwriter (born 1995)

- Born: De'Wayne Jackson; June 27, 1995 (age 31); Spring, Texas, U.S.
- Genres: Alternative rock; punk rock; pop; hip-hop (early)
- Occupations: Musician; singer; songwriter
- Years active: 2009–present
- Labels: MDDN; Hopeless; Fearless
- Website: yeahdewayne.com

De'Wayne Jackson (born June 27, 1995), known professionally as De'Wayne, is an American musician, singer and songwriter from Spring, Texas. He released his debut album Stains in 2021, a second album My Favorite Blue Jeans in 2022 and a third album June in 2025. His music encompasses a combination of rock, funk, and hip-hop.

== Early life and education ==
De'Wayne Jackson was born on June 27, 1995 in Houston. He grew up in a large family in the Houston suburb of Spring, Texas. From 12 to 17, he sang in his church choir. De'Wayne moved from Spring to Los Angeles in 2015, when he was 19 years old.

== Career ==
Four months after arriving in Los Angeles, he met his first manager, Naveed, who would help him get signed to the Madden Brothers' music company MDDN. While attempting to launch his music career, De'Wayne worked odd jobs. In 2016, he released the single, "Best Friend".

In May 2017, he released the EP, Don't Be Afraid. In 2018, he released a collaborative single with Chase Atlantic, "Adios". In November 2019, he dropped his surname from his stage name and was the subject of a mini-documentary commissioned by Dr. Martens, De'Wayne: Tough As You. The same month, he joined Waterparks on tour across the United States.

In 2020, he signed with Hopeless Records, for a two-album record deal. During the COVID-19 pandemic, he completed work on his debut album, Stains. The album's lead single, "National Anthem", was released in June 2020, in the backdop to the George Floyd killing and Black Lives Matter protests. Stains was released in June 2021.

After appearing at the Reading and Leeds Festivals in August 2022, De'Wayne released his second studio album, My Favorite Blue Jeans, in October 2022. In late 2022, he released his second album, My Favorite Blue Jeans. The album features guest appearances from Poorstacy, Grandson, Good Charlotte, and I Don't Know How But They Found Me. Shortly afterwards he signed with Concord and Fearless Records.

In June 2024, he released another EP, I Want You More Than Anybody Wants You. In July 2025, De'Wayne released his third album, June. To promote the album, he toured North America with Red Leather in June 2025.

== Critical reception ==
Of his performance at the Warehouse Live in 2013, the Houston Press said "the youthful nods of opener Dewayne Jackson seemed to liven things up. Never in my life have I ever seen a rapper’s debut performance pack so much energy into every single word."

Of his album Stains, Ones to Watch said "The eleven-track album blends the incendiary nature of his live show, a story that needs to be told, and genreless freedom.... Stains is driven by energy, emotion, excitement....The record dives into themes of identity, love, loss, and the come-up journey." Kerrang! said the album "will leave a mark on you, through a set of songs unremitting in their urgency and potency" and named it as one of the 50 best albums of 2021. Clash said the album was a "lifetime in the making... visceral, incendiary, emotionally-charged" and "blends multiple palettes of sound to become so much more than any label".

Of his second album, My Favorite Blue Jeans, NME said it "injects buckets of confidence and charisma into a stale radio-rock landscape" and "No matter the vibe of the song, though, rock is unmistakably his home base, demonstrated by the unapologetically massive choruses throughout."

Of this third album, June, Classic Rock said it "finds him mining the sounds of the 80s and 90s for inspiration. A deeply loved-up record, it stands to reason that the imprints of Prince are stamped into the yelps, raw sexiness and rooster strut of much of it." Meanwhile, Dork said it "feels the most vibrantly De'Wayne... he's fully embracing his forefathers in the Black lineage of rock and everything beyond".

GR8T magazine wrote: "DE’WAYNE does not just perform—he detonates. With a sound that fuses funk, rock, hip-hop, and alternative soul, his music channels the creative cords of rebellion and the clarity of purpose. It’s an electrifying collision of styles, much like the artist himself.

== Awards and nominations ==
Houston Press Music Awards
Year	Nominee / work	Award	Result	Ref.
2014	Themselves	Best New Act	Nominated	

== Discography ==
Studio albums

- Stains (2021)
- My Favorite Blue Jeans (2022)
- June (2025)

EPs

- Halftime (with Donnie Houston) (2014)
- Don't Be Afraid (2017)
- Top Man (2019)
- I Want You More Than Anybody Wants You (2024)

== Bibliography ==
- Loftin, Steve (June 26, 2024). "De'Wayne is graduating with honours and spreading some love on his new EP, 'I Want You More Than Anybody Wants You'". Dork. Archived from the original on June 26, 2024.
- Loftin, Steven (September 21, 2020). "De'Wayne's world: "I could rock a crowd, and people took to that"". Upset. Archived from the original on October 2, 2020.
- Hosken, Patrick (July 14, 2020). "De'Wayne Is Feeling Mad Beautiful For This Interview". MTV News. Archived from the original on August 15, 2020.
- Garcia, Pamela (August 7, 2022). "Alt-Rock has no bounds for De'Wayne". High School Insider. Los Angeles Times.
- "Digital Cover: De'Wayne". GR8T Magazine. July 30, 2025. Archived from the original on November 30, 2025.
- Robertson, Devin (September 18, 2025). ""I'm My Mom's Son": Rock star De'Wayne talks new album "june" and identity". Newsweek. Archived from the original on September 18, 2025.
