= 1981 Extended Play =

EP by I Dont Know How but They Found Me
- Released: November 9, 2018
- Genre: Indie pop; new wave; alternative rock
- Length: 15:56
- Label: Fearless
- Producer: Dallon Weekes; David Pramik; WZRD BLD; Jason Hill; Pat Morrissey; David Dahlquist

I Dont Know How but They Found Me chronology
1981 Extended Play (2018)	Christmas Drag (2019)

Singles from 1981 Extended Play
- 1. "Choke" Released: October 26, 2017; 2. "Do It All the Time" Released: August 24, 2018; 3. "Bleed Magic" Released: October 26, 2018

Professional ratings
Review scores
Source	Rating
DIY	4/5 stars

1981 Extended Play is the debut EP by American rock duo I Dont Know How but They Found Me, released on November 9, 2018 via Fearless Records.

== Background ==
On October 26, 2017, the duo released the single “Choke" as a follow-up to their debut single “Modern Day Cain”. “Choke” would later be re-released with new artwork alongside the next single, “Do It All the Time” in August 2018. On March 14, 2018 the song "Nobody Likes The Opening Band" and accompanying music video were released as a free download on the band’s website, but would not appear on any official releases until 2020's Razzmatazz.

1981 EP was officially announced on October 12, 2018, the same day the music video for “Do It All the Time” was released. The third and final single from the EP, "Bleed Magic", was released on October 26, 2018. On physical copies of the EP, the track "Choke" has a sample of the 1973 British Public Information short film, Lonely Water, at the very end.

== Track listing ==
No.	Title	Writer(s)	Producer(s)	Length
1.	"Introduction"	Dallon Weekes	Weekes	0:32
2.	"Choke"	Weekes	Weekes	3:15
3.	"Social Climb"	Weekes	Weekes; Jason Hill	2:56
4.	"Bleed Magic"	Weekes; David Pramik; Drew Fulk	Weekes; Pramik; WZRD BLD	3:23
5.	"Absinthe"	Weekes; Tim Anderson; Pat Morrissey	Weekes; Morrissey; David Dahlquist	3:03
6.	"Do It All the Time"	Weekes; Pramik; Fulk; Micah Premnath	Weekes; Pramik; WZRD BLD	2:47
Total length:				15:56

== Personnel ==
- Dallon Weekes – lead vocals, guitars, bass guitar, keyboards, programming, production
- Ryan Seaman – drums, percussion, backup vocals

== Charts ==
Chart (2018)	Peak position
US Billboard 200	148
US Heatseekers Albums (Billboard)	1
US Top Album Sales (Billboard)	32
US Top Alternative Albums (Billboard)	14
US Top Rock Albums (Billboard)	26

== Release history ==
Region	Date	Label	Format	Catalog
Various	November 9, 2018	Fearless	CD, vinyl, Cassette, digital download, streaming	FEAR00693
