= Metaverse (song) =

2024 single by Cage the Elephant

Single by Cage The Elephant

from the album Neon Pill
- Released: May 3, 2024
- Recorded: 2023
- Genre: Alternative rock
- Length: 2:15
- Label: RCA
- Songwriter: Cage The Elephant
- Producer: John Hill

Cage The Elephant singles chronology
"Good Time" (2024)	"Metaverse" (2024)	"Rainbow" (2024)

"Metaverse" is a song by American alternative rock band Cage The Elephant. It was released on May 3, 2024, as the fourth and final single from their album Neon Pill. The song became the bands 13th song to reach number one on the US Alternative Airplay chart, tying them with Green Day and Linkin Park for second-most number-one hits.

The song was featured in the soundtrack to NHL 25.

== Background ==
In an interview with New Hampshire public radio lead singer Matt Shultz spoke on the song stating:

It's one of the first songs where we've opened up the music to collaborate on. And there's an artist out of New York who goes by Danny Switchblade. He put together a mix tape and sent it over. And lyrically, it's kind of like this - I don't know if I'd say a coming-of-age, but it's a song of being on this journey and finding yourself within that in spite of any turbulent times in between.

The song was accompanied with an official lyric video upon release.

== Reception ==
James Reed of mxdwn wrote on the song "The band evokes their inner turmoil and struggles with lyrics like “every day spent far from my family” and “underneath a dark cloud / the spell you pull me under / try to steal my thunder." Arin Chandra of The Daily Cardinal stated the song "serves to emphasize the bittersweet nature of reality and the ever-growing need for escapism, accompanied by exceptional instrumental and vocal performances."

== Charts ==
Chart (2025)	Peak position
Canada Rock (Billboard)	3
US Rock & Alternative Airplay (Billboard)	6
US Alternative Airplay (Billboard)	1
US Adult Alternative Airplay (Billboard)	5
