= Self Aware =

2026 single by Temper City

Single by Temper City
- Released: 15 February 2026
- Genre: Indie rock; alternative rock
- Length: 3:00
- Label: Thirty Knots
- Songwriters: Chen Kordova; Aviv Barenholtz; Eytan Peled
- Producers: Kordova; Barenholtz

Temper City singles chronology
"Self Aware" (2026)	"Reverse Psychology" (2026)

Music video
- "Self Aware" on YouTube

"Self Aware" is the debut single by the Israeli-American alternative rock band Temper City, released on 15 February 2026. Upon its release, the song went viral on the video-sharing app TikTok.

== Background ==
Temper City was formed by three musicians, Chen Kordova and Aviv Barenholtz of the duo "Sync", and Eytan Peled in Los Angeles, California. Kordova and Barenholtz have worked together since they were 12 years old, and previously produced songs for prominent Israeli artists such as Noa Kirel and Netta Barzilai. The three have previously collaborated on the songs "Why So Serious" and "Where We Are" on British label NoCopyrightSounds.

The song combines influences from indie rock and alternative pop. It is characterized by a "dark" and rhythmic sound, which has been compared to the works of Steve Lacy, Hozier, Cage the Elephant, and The Neighbourhood.

== TikTok virality ==
Temper City began teasing the song on TikTok on 28 January 2026, via clips of them recording the song in the middle of the desert. The snippets highlighted the second half of the pre-chorus and the first half of the chorus. The song quickly gained widespread recognition, due to its stylistic similarities to 2010s indie rock bands such as Cage the Elephant and The Neighbourhood, as well as its emotional lyrics.

== Commercial performance ==
According to Luminate, the song earned 128,000 official on-demand streams in the United States during the week of its release (13–19 February 2026). The figure rose to 388,000 the following week, an increase of 201%, before climbing to 849,000 (up 118%) in the week of 27 February – 5 March. By 6–12 March, the song exceeded 1.12 million weekly streams, marking a further 32% increase.

"Self Aware" first entered the Billboard Hot 100 on 18 April 2026 at number 91. It has spent over 7 months on the chart, seeing a peak of number 35. The song topped the Alternative Airplay chart in its 14th week on the chart (25 July 2026) and peaked at No. 2 on the Hot Rock & Alternative Songs (with 4.4 million audience impressions), after debuting at No. 36 in March 2026.

"Self Aware" became a notable hit in other countries. It has spent 6 months on the Australia ARIA charts, peaking at number 10; spent 6 months on the UK charts, peaking at number 23; 5 months on the New Zealand charts, peaking at number 11; 7 months on the Austrian charts peaking at number 3.

== Charts ==
=== Weekly charts ===
Weekly chart performance
Chart (2026)	Peak position
Australia (ARIA)	10
Australia Airplay (RCS)	1
Austria (Ö3 Austria Top 40)	3
Austria Airplay (IFPI)	1
Austria Airplay (MusicTrace)	1
Belarus Airplay (TopHit)	7
Belgium (Ultratop 50 Flanders)	10
Belgium (Ultratop 50 Wallonia)	3
Canada (Canadian Hot 100)	25
Central America Anglo Airplay (Monitor Latino)	14
Colombia Anglo Airplay (Monitor Latino)	14
Croatia International Airplay (Top lista)	27
CIS Airplay (TopHit)	3
Czech Republic Airplay (ČNS IFPI)	50
Czech Republic Singles Digital (ČNS IFPI)	7
Denmark Airplay (Tracklisten)	12
Ecuador Anglo Airplay (Monitor Latino)	11
Estonia Airplay (TopHit)	34
Finland (Suomen virallinen lista)	25
France (SNEP)	30
France Airplay (SNEP)	3
Germany (GfK)	3
Germany Airplay (MusicTrace)	5
Global 200 (Billboard)	12
Greece International (IFPI)	27
Hungary (Editors' Choice Top 40)	21
Hungary (Single Top 40)	16
India International (IMI)	8
Ireland (IRMA)	23
Israel (Mako Hitlist)	28
Israel Airplay (Media Forest)	5
Italy (FIMI)	44
Italy Airplay (EarOne)	24
Italy Airplay (EarOne) Ian Asher version	74
Kazakhstan Airplay (TopHit)	40
Latvia Airplay (LaIPA)	5
Latvia Streaming (LaIPA)	5
Lithuania (AGATA)	8
Lithuania Airplay (TopHit)	6
Luxembourg (Billboard)	7
Mexico Anglo Airplay (Monitor Latino)	10
Moldova Airplay (TopHit)	5
Netherlands (Dutch Top 40)	5
Netherlands (Single Top 100)	22
New Zealand (Recorded Music NZ)	11
Nicaragua Anglo Airplay (Monitor Latino)	5
Norway (VG-lista)	15
Norway Airplay (IFPI)	22
Panama Anglo Airplay (Monitor Latino)	5
Panama Streaming (PRODUCE)	90
Poland Airplay (OLiS)	1
Poland Airplay (OLiS) Lumix version	53
Poland Streaming (OLiS)	17
Portugal (AFP)	29
Romania Airplay (TopHit)	77
Russia Airplay (TopHit)	9
Russia Streaming (TopHit)	97
San Marino Airplay (SMRTV Top 50)	31
Serbia Airplay (Radiomonitor)	20
Singapore (RIAS)	16
Slovakia Airplay (ČNS IFPI)	1
Slovakia Singles Digital (ČNS IFPI)	7
Slovenia Airplay (Radiomonitor)	2
Sweden (Sverigetopplistan)	14
Sweden Airplay (Radiomonitor)	6
Switzerland (Schweizer Hitparade)	3
Switzerland Airplay (MusicTrace)	1
Turkey International Airplay (Radiomonitor Türkiye)	1
Ukraine Airplay (TopHit)	6
UK Singles (Official Charts)	23
UK Independent (Official Charts)	4
Uruguay Anglo Airplay (Monitor Latino)	12
US Billboard Hot 100	35
US Hot Rock & Alternative Songs (Billboard)	8
US Pop Airplay (Billboard)	30
Venezuela Airplay (Record Report)	41
Venezuela Rock Airplay (Record Report)	1

=== Monthly charts ===
Monthly chart performance
Chart (2026)	Peak position
Belarus Airplay (TopHit)	9
CIS Airplay (TopHit)	6
Estonia Airplay (TopHit)	36
Kazakhstan Airplay (TopHit)	38
Latvia Airplay (TopHit)	40
Lithuania Airplay (TopHit)	6
Moldova Airplay (TopHit)	8
Panama Streaming (PRODUCE)	104
Russia Airplay (TopHit)	11
Ukraine Airplay (TopHit)	6

== Certifications ==
Certifications
Region	Certification	Certified units/sales
Italy (FIMI)	Gold	100,000^{‡}
New Zealand (RMNZ)	Gold	15,000^{‡}
Portugal (AFP)	Gold	12,000^{‡}
Streaming
Czech Republic (ČNS IFPI)	Gold	2,500,000^{†}
Slovakia (ČNS IFPI)	Gold	850,000^{†}
^{‡} Sales+streaming figures based on certification alone.^{†} Streaming-only figures based on certification alone.

== Release history ==
Release history
Region	Date	Format(s)	Label	Ref.
United States	August 18, 2026	Contemporary hit radio	Thirty Knots	
