= Neon Pill =

Studio album by Cage the Elephant
- Released: May 17, 2024
- Length: 38:35
- Label: RCA
- Producer: John Hill

Cage the Elephant chronology
Social Cues (2019)	Neon Pill (2024)	Dying in Reverse (2027)

Singles from Neon Pill
- 1. "Neon Pill" Released: January 19, 2024; 2. "Out Loud" Released: February 29, 2024; 3. "Good Time" Released: April 5, 2024; 4. "Metaverse" Released: May 3, 2024

Neon Pill is the sixth studio album by American rock band Cage the Elephant. It was released on May 17, 2024, by RCA Records. Neon Pill follows Social Cues (2019), which marks the longest gap between two Cage the Elephant studio albums. The title track was nominated for Best Alternative Music Performance at the 67th Annual Grammy Awards.

== Background ==
The album's full track listing was announced by Cage the Elephant on social media on March 19, 2024.

The album material was written over a long, eventful period about five years after Social Cues. The band's unusually long period between albums was due to lead singer Matt Shultz experiencing a severe mental health crisis triggered by an adverse reaction to prescribed ADHD medication, which led to paranoid delusions and a break from reality. This ultimately resulted in him being arrested for firearm possession, but he was able to recover, after which he reunited with the band and they continued to work on the album. Guitarist Brad Shultz stated "Every record has its journey and this was the longest amount of time it took us to make a record, but it was meant to be what it was," while remarking that the recording process "had a lot of starts and stops but when we actually started making the record, it was maybe a month and we were done." He also explained that some of the songs were inspired by their father who was also a musician, and emphasized that their influences for Neon Pill were less about "what's trending" or "discovering new music" and more about channeling what was inside them.

== Musical style and lyrical inspirations ==
A majority of the album's material was written over a four year period in which lead singer Matt Shultz was in and out of his psychosis. In an interview Shultz stated:

Much of the lyrics were written while I was actually in psychosis. At that time, the lyrics had a profound meaning to me. Obviously, once I was well into my recovery, coming back to them, that meaning totally shifted and many of the songs' profound meanings had no basis in reality. So I had to kind of decipher what the songs were about, and for many of them it was about finding the sentiment in the song and then reapproaching from that place. There were some lyrics that were left as-is—I think that's where some of the more colorful turns of phrase came from.

The album features lyrics reflecting Shultz's psychological descent and recovery, blending confessional songwriting with the band's evolving, genre-fluid sound. "Rainbow" was the first song written for the album and is about Shultz wife Eva. He commented "it was really this song about the genesis of love and continuously being lifted up by that. "Out Loud" and "Over Your Shoulder" are references to Matt and Brad Shultz's father who died in 2020.

In an interview with IHeartRadio, Shultz explained why Neon Pill was chosen for the name of the album, "I definitely went through a really difficult time where I was prescribed a medication and unknowingly went into psychosis — it can happen, it's a terrible thing if it does — but I'm a living miracle right now, so that's probably the biggest reason why we chose that as the title track."

While writing the song "Float Into the Sky" Shultz noted he felt very isolated and had trouble communicating what he was going through. "That song is definitely confronting isolation and at this deep feeling of lonerism. Going through what I was going through, I was completely unrelatable to most of the people who were around me, and trying to relate was a real battle. It was difficult." When asked about the song "Metaverse" Shultz stated "That song was written about feeling like I was far from anyone that actually loves me and the people that then started to gather around me were more of these vulture type of people who prey on people who are vulnerable and in a bad place."

Some tracks are more glam / swaggering rock (e.g. "Ball and Chain"). Others are more restrained or emotional soft ballads, piano-led and alt-rock textures. In some cases it pulls together elements from across their past albums not leaning heavily into one era or style, but blending them together. Unlike previous releases the band did not draw direct inspiration from other artists while working on the album. Shultz commented on the process stating "We weren't reaching for much outside of the pure experience of self-expression, and simultaneously not necessarily settling either. We just found a uniqueness in simply existing."

== Release and promotion ==
The album was preceded by the release of the title track as the lead single on January 19, 2024. The song was the band's first release in five years. The second single, "Out Loud", was released on February 29, 2024, simultaneously with the album's announcement. The third and fourth singles, "Good Time" and "Metaverse", were released on April 5 and May 3 respectively. A music video for "Neon Pill" was later released on May 20. The songs "Neon Pill", "Rainbow" and "Metaverse" all topped the Billboard Alternative Songs chart. This brought the band's total number one hits on the chart to 13, tying both Green Day and Linkin Park for second-most all time. They debuted "Rainbow" on Jimmy Kimmel Live! on May 8.

On May 20, 2024, Cage the Elephant held an album release party in collaboration with IHeartRadio. The concert was held exclusively in VR only in Meta Horizon Worlds, along with being played on Alternative Rock stations in the US.

In the U.S. Neon Pill sold roughly 15,330 units in its first week. Around half of those units were actual sales, as the title sold 8,972 copies after it arrived. It debuted at number 57 on the Billboard 200, 15 on the Top Rock & Alternative Albums and 12 on the Top Rock Albums. Internationally it debuted at 47 on the Scottish Albums chart and 67 on Portuguese Albums chart.

The band then went on the Neon Pill tour in support of the album, making their first tour in nearly two years in alongside Young the Giant and Bakar. The album took place in the fall of 2024 consisting of 47 dates in North America. This tour went on to become the highest grossing of their career, with sales of over 440,000 tickets, generating $25 million. They also made an appearance on The Tonight Show Starring Jimmy Fallon, playing their song "Rainbow".

== Critical reception ==
Professional ratings
Aggregate scores
Source	Rating
Metacritic	74/100
Review scores
Source	Rating
AllMusic	3.5/5 stars
Clash	7/10
Paste	7.8/10
Rolling Stone	4/5 stars
The Daily Cardinal	7/10
Blabbermouth.net	9/10
Howl Magazine	Very positive

Upon release, Neon Pill received generally positive reviews from critics. At Metacritic, which assigns a normalized rating out of 100 based on reviews from mainstream publications, the album has an average score of 74 based on seven reviews, indicating "generally favorable reviews". Stephen Thomas from AllMusic gave the album a positive review, stating "The album may have been written during a dark night of the soul but it was recorded with precision and concentration, ultimately obscuring the pain at the point of origin." Arin Chandra of The Daily Cardinal wrote "Although it is not as strong as the band's other albums in terms of instrumental power and catchiness, the themes of self-struggle and acceptance ring true in their latest work. It marks another addition to their impressive and unique discography and is a solid return to form after a five-year hiatus." Blabbermouth.net added "While Neon Pill is a modern album, musically, it's very retro, embracing sounds from the '60s, '70s and '80s. Throughout the album, Shultz is passionate without sounding over the top, which is a good fit for the band's low-fi backings. "Neon Pill" is a blend of trademark Cage the Elephant along with sounds that span different eras of music. Its hooky, melodic nature fits the Cage the Elephant aura."

The title track was nominated for Best Alternative Music Performance at the 67th Annual Grammy Awards, marking the band's fourth nomination.

== Track listing ==
All tracks are written by Matt Shultz, Brad Shultz, Nick Bockrath, Matthan Minster, Daniel Tichenor, and Jared Champion, except where noted.

Neon Pill track listing
No.	Title	Length
1.	"HiFi (True Light)"	3:22
2.	"Rainbow"	3:15
3.	"Neon Pill" (Bockrath, Champion, Minster, B. Schulz, M. Schulz, Tichenor, Vlad Holiday)	3:21
4.	"Float Into the Sky"	3:58
5.	"Metaverse" (Bockrath, Champion, Minster, B. Schulz, M. Schulz, Tichenor, Jermaine Armstead, Holiday)	2:14
6.	"Out Loud" (M. Shultz, Caitlyn Smith)	3:20
7.	"Ball and Chain"	2:46
8.	"Good Time"	3:07
9.	"Shy Eyes"	3:12
10.	"Silent Picture"	3:45
11.	"Same"	2:58
12.	"Over Your Shoulder" (Bockrath, Champion, Minster, B. Schulz, M. Schulz, Tichenor, Holiday)	3:17
Total length:		38:35

== Personnel ==
Cage the Elephant

- Matt Shultz – vocals, guitar
- Brad Shultz – guitar, synthesizer
- Nick Bockrath – guitar, synthesizer
- Matthan Minster – piano, synthesizer, backing vocals, drums
- Daniel Tichenor – bass
- Jared Champion – drums

Additional contributors

- John Hill – production
- Randy Merrill – mastering
- Manny Marroquin – mixing
- Jeremy Ferguson – engineering
- John Mueller – engineering
- Jon Yeston – engineering
- Jonny Bell – engineering
- Chris Galland – engineering assistance
- Eli Epstein – engineering assistance
- Jeremie Inhaber – engineering assistance
- Josue San Martin – engineering assistance
- Kenny Harrington – engineering assistance
- Lauren Marquez – engineering assistance
- Mario Ramírez – engineering assistance
- Robin Florent – engineering assistance
- Skyler Chuckry – engineering assistance
- Rob Moose – strings on "Neon Pill", "Out Loud", and "Good Time"
- Katie Schecter – background vocals on "Neon Pill" and "Good Time"
- Nick Winegardner – background vocals on "Neon Pill" and "Good Time"
- Paige MacKinnon – background vocals on "Neon Pill" and "Good Time"

== Charts ==
Chart performance for Neon Pill
Chart (2024)	Peak position
French Physical Albums (SNEP)	86
Portuguese Albums (AFP)	67
Scottish Albums (Official Charts)	47
UK Album Downloads (Official Charts)	50
US Billboard 200	57
US Top Rock & Alternative Albums (Billboard)	15
US Top Rock Albums (Billboard)	12
