= Temper City =

Israeli alternative rock band

- Temper City's logo

Background information
- Genre: Alternative rock
- Years active: 2026–present
- Labels: Thirty Knots; Interscope
- Spinoff of: Sync
- Members: Eytan Peled; Aviv Barenholtz; Chen Kordova
- Website: tempercity.com

Temper City is an Israeli alternative rock band made up of vocalist Eytan Peled and producers Chen Kordova and Aviv Barenholtz. They first came to public attention in 2026 with their debut single "Self Aware".

== History ==
In 2021, singer-songwriter Eytan Peled met the production duo Sync comprising Aviv Barenholtz and Chen Kordova. The three friends had previously written songs for pop and EDM artists such as Zeds Dead, Dimitri Vegas, and Barns Courtney. After composing songs together, they decided to make a band of their own.

=== Initial success ===
On February 15, 2026, the band released its debut single, "Self Aware", under the Thirty Knots label. The song went viral on social media, and appeared on the viral charts of Spotify and TikTok in 42 countries, including the United States, the UK, Israel, and Australia. Additionally, the song entered the US Billboard Hot 100, peaking at number 60, making the band the first Israeli band to appear on that chart. This success was accompanied by thousands of uses of the song's audio on TikTok and streams across various platforms.

== Singles ==
List of singles, with selected chart positions, showing year released and album name
Year	Title	Peak chart positions										Certifications	Album
Year	Title	ISR	AUS	AUT	CAN	GER	IND Int.	IRE	UK	US	WW	Certifications	Album
"Self Aware"	2026	28	10	8	25	4	8	23	23	35	12	RMNZ: Gold; AFP: Gold	TBA
"Reverse Psychology"	2026	—	—	—	—	—	—	—	—	—	—		TBA
"Sex & Drugs"	2026	—	—	—	—	—	—	—	—	—	—		TBA
"—" denotes a recording that did not chart or was not released in that territory.

== Music videos ==
List of music videos, showing director(s) and year released
Title	Year	Director
"Self Aware"	2026	Temper City and Tsuf Kazaz
"Reverse Psychology"	2026	Temper City and Ryan Simmons
