= Choke (I Dont Know How but They Found Me song) =

2017 single by I Dont Know How but They Found Me

Single by I Dont Know How but They Found Me

from the album 1981 Extended Play
- A-side: "Do It All the Time"
- Released: October 26, 2017; August 24, 2018 (re-release)
- Recorded: 2017
- Genre: Indie rock; indie pop; alternative rock; new wave
- Length: 3:13
- Label: None You Jerk; Fearless (re-release)
- Songwriter: Dallon Weekes
- Producer: Dallon Weekes

I Dont Know How but They Found Me singles chronology
"Modern Day Cain" (2017)	"Choke" (2017)	"Do It All the Time" (2018)

Music video
- "Choke" on YouTube

"Choke" is a song by American rock band I Dont Know How but They Found Me. It was originally released independently on October 26, 2017. The song was written and produced by bassist and vocalist Dallon Weekes. On August 24, 2018, the band re-released "Choke" alongside a new song titled "Do It All the Time" as a double A-side single for their debut EP 1981 Extended Play (2018), marking their first release under Fearless Records.

== Background ==
After the single "Modern Day Cain" was released, the band announced that a new single would be released.

== Music video ==
The music video for the song was released on January 11, 2019, and was directed by Raúl Gonzo. The video shows current band member Dallon Weekes and former band member Ryan Seaman in a "short-lived music television program that aired briefly in Eastern Europe in the early 1980s".

== Charts ==
Chart performance for "Choke"
Chart (2019)	Peak position
US Hot Rock & Alternative Songs (Billboard)	29
US Rock & Alternative Airplay (Billboard)	22

== Certifications ==
Certifications for "Choke"
Region	Certification	Certified units/sales
Canada (Music Canada)	Gold	40,000^{‡}
United Kingdom (BPI)	Silver	200,000^{‡}
United States (RIAA)	Platinum	1,000,000^{‡}
^{‡} Sales+streaming figures based on certification alone.
