= Debra (song) =

Song by Beck

from the album Midnite Vultures
- Released: November 16, 1999
- Recorded: 1998
- Studio: Conway Studios, G-Son Studios, Sunset Sound (Los Angeles), The Shop (Arcata)
- Genre: Soul, funk
- Length: 5:43; 13:46 (with hidden track)
- Label: DGC
- Songwriters: Ed Green, Hansen, John King, Michael Simpson
- Producers: Beck, Dust Brothers

"Debra" is a song by the American musician Beck. It was released on his 1999 album Midnite Vultures.

== Background ==
Beck had originally attempted to record and release "Debra" with the Dust Brothers for 1996's Odelay, but he thought that it was too tongue-in-cheek. It debuted mainstream in 1996, and, as Beck noted, "it became the centerpiece of the whole set. It was the song that people would react to more than the songs that they'd heard on the radio. So we kept playing it and playing it". The song finally made it on to Midnite Vultures in 1999.

== Composition ==
The lyrics include a reference to the Los Angeles-based restaurant chain Zankou Chicken, as well as a mention of car manufacturer Hyundai and a reference to another song on Midnite Vultures, "Sexx Laws".

Debra contains samples of two songs; "Win" by David Bowie and "My Love for You" by Ramsey Lewis.

== In popular culture ==
Many music critics consider "Debra" to be one of Beck's greatest songs, with Ty Kulik claiming that "Midnite Vultures is a tremendous record, and "Debra" is the highlight of the whole record." The song was used in the 2017 Edgar Wright film Baby Driver and appeared on its soundtrack and as inspiration for music by Flight of the Conchords.

== Cover versions ==
The song was covered by German industrial artist Kompressor on his 2003 album Industrial Archives. Kompressor's version is called "Kompressor Want to Get with You".

Additionally, the song has been covered in live shows by the US band I Dont Know How but They Found Me. This version was released digitally on 26 February 2021 and appeared on their EP Razmatazz B-Sides.

The jam band Umphrey’s McGee also covers "Debra" in live shows, most notably at Sweetwater 420 Fest in Atlanta in 2022.
