= I Dont Know How but They Found Me =

American pop/rock music project

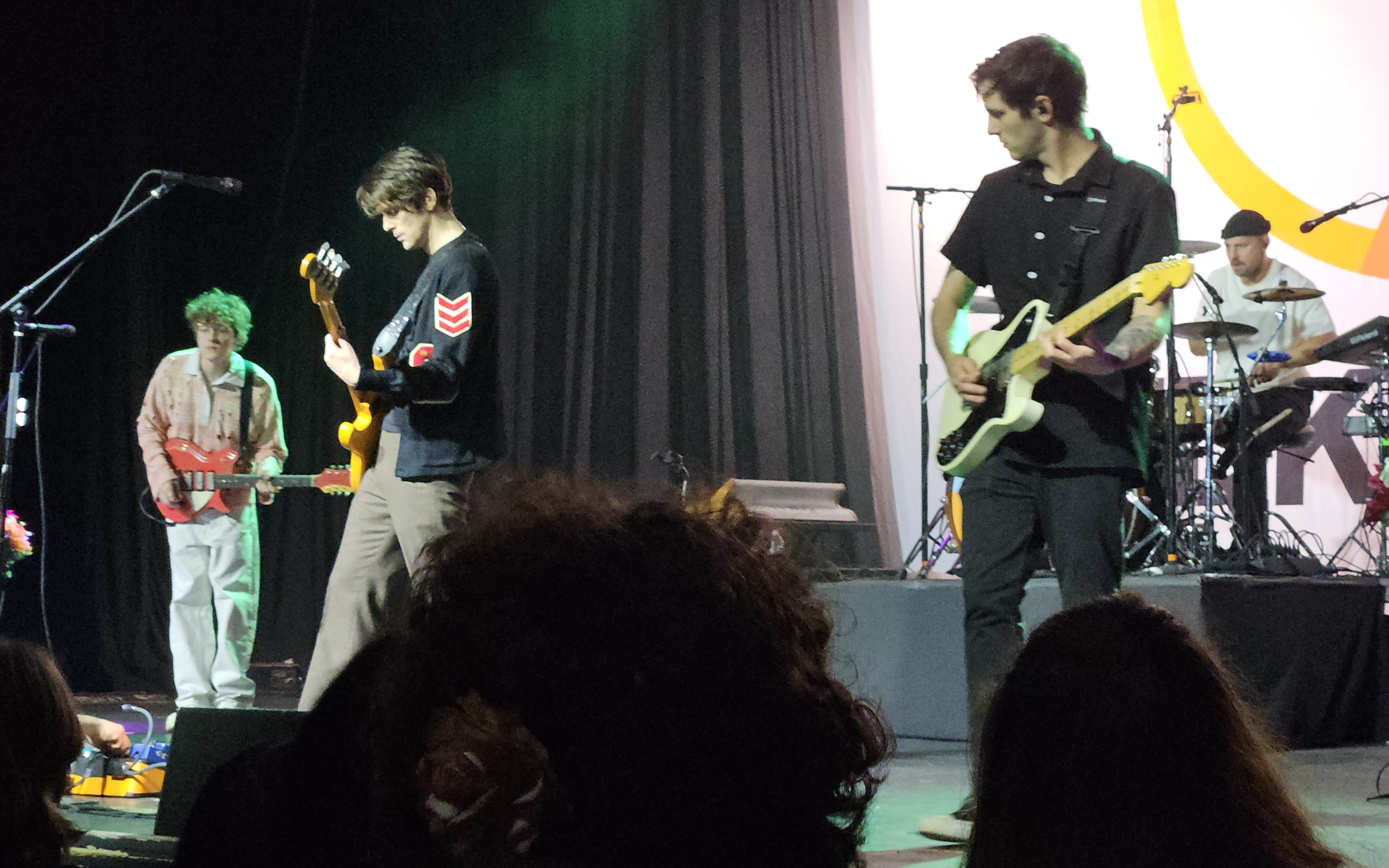
- I Dont Know How but They Found Me performing at Old National Center, Indianapolis, 2024

Background information
- Origin: Salt Lake City, Utah, U.S.
- Genres: Indie pop; new wave; pop rock; electronic rock; alternative rock
- Years active: 2016–present
- Labels: Concord; Fearless; None You Jerk
- Spinoff of: The Brobecks
- Members: Dallon Weekes
- Past members: Ryan Seaman
- Website: idkhow.com

I Dont Know How but They Found Me, often shortened to IDKHow (stylized as iDKHOW), is an American indie pop solo project based in Salt Lake City, Utah, fronted by singer-songwriter Dallon Weekes. It was originally formed as a duo in 2016 consisting of Weekes and drummer Ryan Seaman, a former member of Weekes' previous project The Brobecks, until the latter was let go in 2023.

Formed in secrecy, Weekes and Seaman denied the band's existence before promoting their debut EP 1981 Extended Play, released in 2018. The duo was described as "the hottest unsigned band in the world" on the cover of Rock Sound in March 2018, before signing with Fearless Records. The band released their debut studio album Razzmatazz in 2020, with their second album, Gloom Division, following four years later.

== History ==
=== Formation and secrecy (2016–2017) ===
Prior to the formation of the band, Dallon Weekes and Ryan Seaman were longtime friends who had worked together in the past. Seaman joined Weekes' former band The Brobecks in 2008 and played drums for Weekes' solo projects, including the songs "Sickly Sweet Holidays" and "Please Don't Jump (It's Christmas)."

Initially a solo act, Weekes had been writing and recording songs for several years while on the road with Panic! at the Disco. Seaman performed drums on these songs, which eventually became their debut EP 1981 Extended Play, and Weekes proposed that they present themselves as a duo.

The "I Dont Know How but They Found Me" moniker and project idea has existed since 2009. Uniquely, the punctuation of the band name is intentionally incorrect, with no apostrophe in "don't" and no comma after "how." Weekes credited it to his time in Panic! at the Disco, stating that in the band, "punctuation was a big deal, so I just wanted to take the opposite approach and get rid of it all." The band's name was inspired by a quote from the movie Back to the Future.

Weekes and Seaman began secretly performing in small venues from late 2016 to mid-2017. They debuted at Emo Nite Los Angeles's 2-year anniversary event on December 6, 2016. After the show, different sources wrote about a "new side project" by Weekes and Seaman and confirmed the band name. Even when confronted with photos and videos taken at the shows, Weekes and Seaman denied the project's existence for months. Weekes later stated that they did not want to exploit his and Seaman's name recognition and association with the well-known bands they played in. Seaman would depart his band Falling in Reverse in May 2017, followed by Weekes leaving Panic! at the Disco in December.

=== Touring and 1981 Extended Play (2017–2020) ===
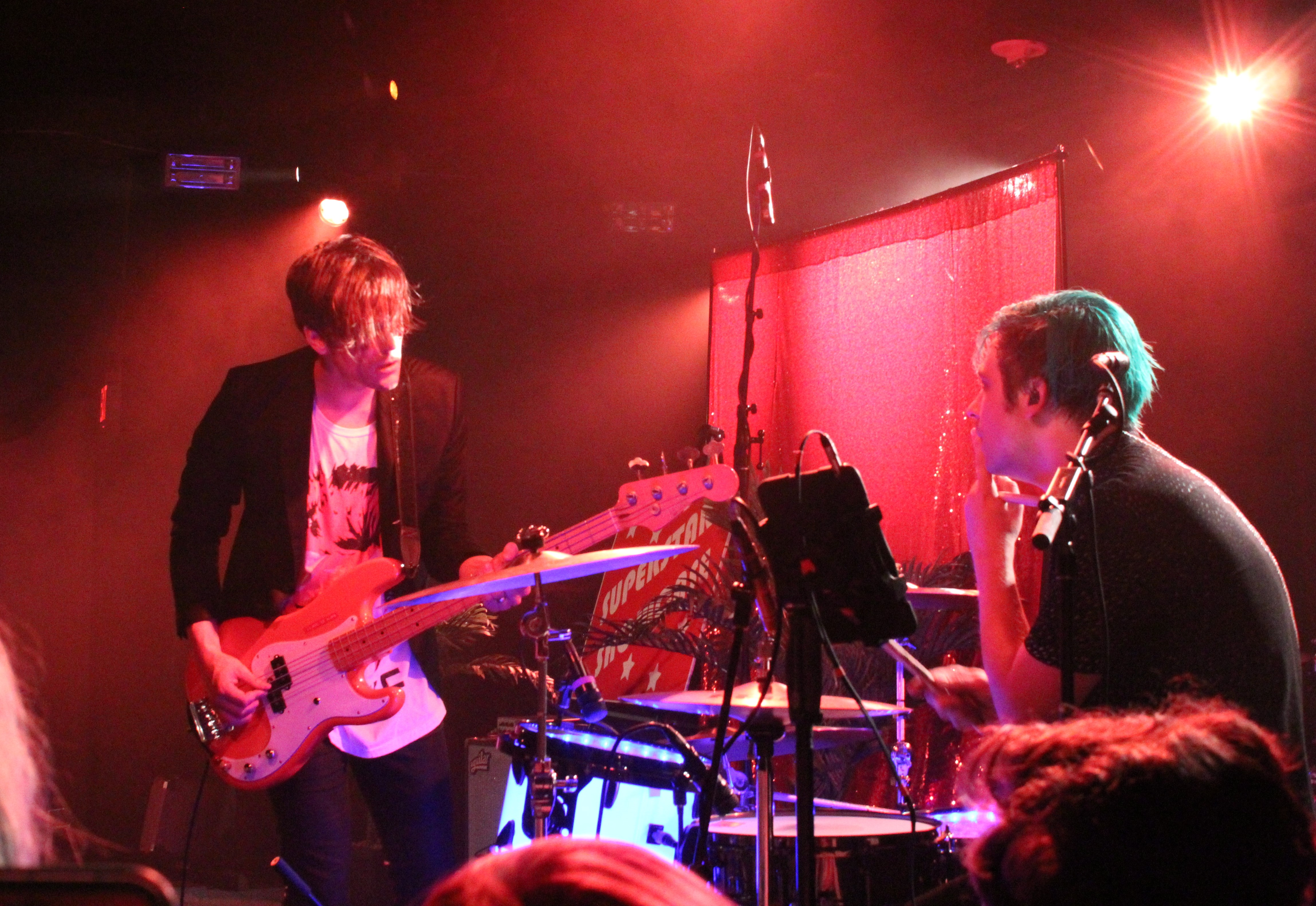
I Dont Know How but They Found Me performing in June 2018; Dallon Weekes (left) and Ryan Seaman (right)

The duo teased the release of their first song "Modern Day Cain" one day prior with a post on their Instagram account. On August 18, 2017, the full song was self-released on iTunes and Spotify, and followed up with a music video on the same day. The single reached number 8 of the Top 10 Alternative Music Charts on iTunes on the day of release. The duo's second single "Choke" was released on October 26, 2017. It was again self-published and accompanied by a lyric video. The single peaked at number 7 of the iTunes Top 100 Alternative Music Charts. The band went on a few short tours between July and December 2017, playing shows in Utah, California, and other neighboring states, as well as one show in New York. They also performed as the opening act for The Aquabats and Dashboard Confessional. On March 14, 2018, they released the song "Nobody Likes The Opening Band" as a free download on their website accompanied with a music video. On March 28, it was announced that the band would perform at the Reading and Leeds Festivals.

On August 24, the duo re-released "Choke" alongside a new song titled "Do It All The Time" as a double A-side single via Fearless Records. In October, the duo announced their debut EP titled 1981 Extended Play, with a release date of November 9. Later that month, they released a single from the EP titled "Bleed Magic". Upon its release, the EP topped the US Billboard Heatseekers chart. In March, 2019, the duo announced "Night Heat", a headlining tour consisting of 17 stops across North America as well as music festivals from April 28 to May 18 with the band Superet supporting headlining dates.

On April 26, 2019, the duo released the single "Choke (Acoustic)" which features a cabaret style version of their hit single. The band also released a Christmas EP titled Christmas Drag on November 15, 2019, which includes a cover of "Merry Christmas Everybody". This was followed by three music videos, one for each song on the EP.

=== Razzmatazz (2020–2023) ===
On August 5, 2020, IDKHow released a lyric video for the single "Leave Me Alone" and announced the coming release of their debut album, Razzmatazz. On September 16, the title track "Razzmatazz" was released, along with a lyric video. On October 2, "New Invention" and an accompanying lyric video were released. The album was released on October 23, 2020.

The duo made several television appearances the following year, including their television debut on Jimmy Kimmel Live! on January 25, a performance on The Ellen DeGeneres Show on February 23, and CBS This Morning's Saturday Sessions. They also released a cover of the Beck song "Debra" alongside the Ellen performance, and later released a new single called "Mx. Sinister" which had previously performed live under the title "Mr. Sinister."

IDKHow performed their first non-televised live show since the start of the COVID-19 pandemic at Utah's Fork Fest in June, which was followed by four headlining dates in the UK in August. These included sold-out shows at Glasgow's SWG3 and London's Kentish Town Forum as well as a set on the Main Stage of the Reading and Leeds Festivals. The band then announced the Razzmatazzmatour, which ran from November 2–20, 2021, as well as the Thought Reform Tour, which ran from January 18 – February 26, 2022. A remix of "New Invention" featuring Tessa Violet was released on November 5, 2021 and preceded the release of a deluxe version of Razzmatazz. This version included seven additional tracks, including a cover of the Cure song "Boys Don't Cry", a demo version of "From the Gallows", live renditions of "Sugar Pills" and "Leave Me Alone" and the previously released remix of "New Invention".

On May 31, 2022, the band announced The Welcome to Hellvetica Tour, a North American co-headlining tour with Joywave. Later that year, De'Wayne released the song "Simple" featuring IDKhow as a single ahead of his album My Favorite Blue Jeans.

=== Seaman's firing and Gloom Division (2023–present) ===
On September 16, 2023, Weekes announced the band's signing to Concord Records, as well as the firing of Ryan Seaman after "a series of broken trusts," leaving Weekes as the sole member of the project. He later stated on Bluesky that there are currently no plans to find a permanent replacement for Seaman.

On October 5, 2023, IDKHow released a new single titled "What Love?" and its accompanying music video, and announced their sophomore album, Gloom Division, to be released February 23, 2024. The band also announced that they would be performing a holiday-themed hometown show later that year alongside an international Gloomtown Tour announcement to support the new album in 2024. On December 7, 2023, a second single was released, titled "Gloomtown Brats". On January 11, 2024, a third single titled "Infatuation" was released, as well as its music video. Gloom Division was officially fully released on February 23, 2024, with "Downside" as the fourth single. Following the Gloomtown Tour, IDKhow embarked on the iMPENDiNG GLOOM tour later that year.

Throughout the beginning of 2025, IDKhow performed multiple one-off shows across the United States, including the Salt Lake City stop of Bernie Sanders' Fighting Oligarchy Tour. In March 2025 they announced a short run of headlining tour dates in between their sets at the Kilby Block Party and Boston Calling festivals, followed by a tour with Phantom Planet during the summer. On July 30, 2025, IDKhow collaborated with De'Wayne again, featuring on the song "Forever" off of De'Wayne's album June.

Several more tour and festival dates were announced for the latter half of 2025, including the Limited Engagement Tour in September, opening for Waterparks on three dates of The Prowler Tour, and Warped Tour in Orlando. They also announced that they would be opening for Boys Like Girls on their The Soundtrack of Your Life Tour in 2026 along with Arrows in Action.

== Musical style and influences ==
The band's style has mainly been described as indie pop. Weekes has also described their musical style as indie pop, as well as "hipster nonsense" and "Glam Wham". They have also been described as new wave, alternative, electronic rock, "electro pop rock", and a pop rock-influenced mix of "sixties garage, seventies glam, eighties new wave, and the early days of Britpop".

Around the time of its inception, the band described itself as "...a band out of time. One who faded away into obscurity after struggling to find success in the late 70's and early 80's". The music, appearance, and social media presence of the group were strongly influenced by the style of the 1980s, and Weekes has stated that he draws inspiration from the pop culture of the time.

Among others, Weekes has named Marc Bolan, David Bowie, Oingo Boingo, Elvis Costello, The Ink Spots, and Joe Jackson as musical influences for the band's sound.

== Band members ==
Current members

- Dallon Weekes – lead vocals, bass, guitar, synthesizers, piano, keyboards, ukulele (2016–present)

Touring members

- Anthony Purpura – guitar, keyboards, bass, backing vocals (2021–present)
- Isaac Paul – guitar, keyboards, bass, backing vocals (2023–present)
- Ronnie Strauss – drums, backing vocals (2023–present)

Former members

- Ryan Seaman – drums, backing vocals (2016–2023)

== Discography ==
Studio albums

- Razzmatazz (2020)
- Gloom Division (2024)

Extended plays

- 1981 Extended Play (2018)
- Christmas Drag (2019)
- Razzmatazz B-Sides (2021)

== Tours ==
- Content Tour (2018)
- Entertainment Tour: North America (2018; as supporting act for Waterparks)
- Night Heat Tour (2019)
- Silversun Pickups Tour (2019; as supporting act for Silversun Pickups)
- Razzmatazzmatour (2021)
- Thought Reform Tour (2022)
- Welcome to Hellvetica Tour (2022; co-headlining with Joywave)
- Gloomtown Tour (2024)
- iMPENDiNG GLOOM Tour (2024)
- Summer Gloom Division Tour with Phantom Planet (2025)
- Limited Engagement Tour (2025)
- The Prowler Tour (2025; as support for Waterparks)
- Soundtrack of Your Life Tour (2026; as support for Boys Like Girls)
