= Leave Me Alone (I Dont Know How but They Found Me song) =

2020 single by I Dont Know How but They Found Me

Single by I Dont Know How but They Found Me

from the album Razzmatazz
- Released: August 5, 2020
- Recorded: January–March 2020
- Genre: Indie rock; indie pop; alternative rock; new wave
- Length: 3:35
- Label: Fearless Records
- Songwriter: Dallon Weekes
- Producer: Tim Pagnotta

I Dont Know How but They Found Me singles chronology
"Bleed Magic" (2018)	"Leave Me Alone" (2020)	"Razzmatazz" (2020)

Lyric video
- "Leave Me Alone" on YouTube

Music video
- "Leave Me Alone" on YouTube

"Leave Me Alone" is a song by American rock duo I Dont Know How but They Found Me. The song was written by bassist and vocalist Dallon Weekes, with production by Tim Pagnotta. It was released on August 5, 2020, as the lead single for the project's debut studio album, Razzmatazz. "Leave Me Alone" reached number one on Billboard's Alternative Airplay chart, making it the first song of the group to do so.

== Background ==
Following the duo's 2018 and 2019 EPs, I Dont Know How but They Found Me announced their debut studio album, Razzmatazz on August 5, 2020, alongside releasing its lead single, "Leave Me Alone". The song was vaguely teased in June 2020, with the band tweeting a lyric to it.

When asked about the song, lead singer Dallon Weekes stated "when you're in a toxic situation, the phrase 'Leave Me Alone' is the last civil thing you say before things get uncivil". Weekes additionally cited his "distaste for all things Los Angeles" as an influence for the album's general tone. The song's demo was created by Weekes in January 2020. It was then passed to the song's producer, Tim Pagnotta, in February before a later studio recording. In an interview with American Songwriter, Weekes mentioned David Bowie, Prince, and Don Henley as influences for the song.

An acoustic piano version of "Leave Me Alone" was released on January 22, 2021, shortly before I Dont Know How but They Found Me began performing the song live on various shows. The duo made their television debut on Jimmy Kimmel Live! on January 26, 2021, which additionally was the fifth anniversary of Weekes' appearance on the show with Panic! at the Disco. They would later perform the song at the Gateway in Salt Lake City for the Ellen DeGeneres Show on February 23, 2021.

== Music videos ==
IDKHow uses old technology in the song's videos to depict retro-futurism.

On the single's release day, a lyric video for "Leave Me Alone" was released, featuring the lyrics appearing on an old computer at a desk. Preceding each verse and chorus, a source code is run to make pre-timed lyrics appear with the song. The computer screen is cleaned after the first chorus by an off-screen person. Weekes described the lyric video's aesthetic as "retro-futurism", stating "there's something special about old technology to me. It was almost always like a living thing that you had to wrestle and fight with in order to get it to do what you want" on the set of the video.

On September 2, 2020, a music video directed by Raúl Gonzo was released for the song. The video depicts Weekes and Seaman performing the song in plastic cubes and bubbles while surrounded by various medical workers and technicians, who later use technology to transport Weekes into a computer. The plastic cells that the band performs in were inspired by a scene from E.T. the Extra-Terrestrial, and the helmet with various technological parts on it was inspired by an outfit Christopher Lloyd wore in Back to the Future.

The video's imagery is heavily influenced by the COVID-19 pandemic, as Weekes stated the decision to "incorporate a lot of things from the state of the world as it is now. Social distancing, sterile isolation … it all seemed to fit with the song’s themes of wanting to quarantine yourself from toxic people and situations". Concerning the making of the video, the group stated that "making a video in the middle of a pandemic was a challenge". The video was filmed in Los Angeles, with the video's production crew following safety protocol for COVID-19 with a Covid Compliance Officer onsite.

== Track listings ==
Digital download

1. "Leave Me Alone" – 3:35

Digital download (2021)

1. "Leave Me Alone (Piano version)" – 3:32

Razzmatazz B-Sides

1. "Mx. Sinister" – 3:02
2. "Modern Day Cain" (Slow Jam version) – 2:58
3. "Leave Me Alone" – 3:44
4. "Debra" – 4:36
5. "From the Gallows" (Demo) – 2:31
6. "Leave Me Alone" (Piano version) – 3:32

== Personnel ==
Credits adapted from Tidal.

- Dallon Weekes – lead vocals, bass guitar, synthesizer, composer
- Ryan Seaman – drums
- Tim Pagnotta – producer, recording engineer, recording producer, composer
- Brian Phillips – recording engineer
- Ian Walsh – guitar

"Leave Me Alone (Piano Version)"

- Dallon Weekes - lead vocals, piano, mixing, recording engineer, recording producer
- Michelle Mancini – mastering engineer

== Charts ==
Chart performance for "Leave Me Alone"
Chart (2020–2021)	Peak position
Canada Rock (Billboard)	12
US Adult Alternative Airplay (Billboard)	7
US Alternative Airplay (Billboard)	1
US Hot Rock & Alternative Songs (Billboard)	46
US Rock & Alternative Airplay (Billboard)	8

== See also ==
- List of Billboard Alternative Airplay number ones of the 2020s
