= Cage the Elephant discography =

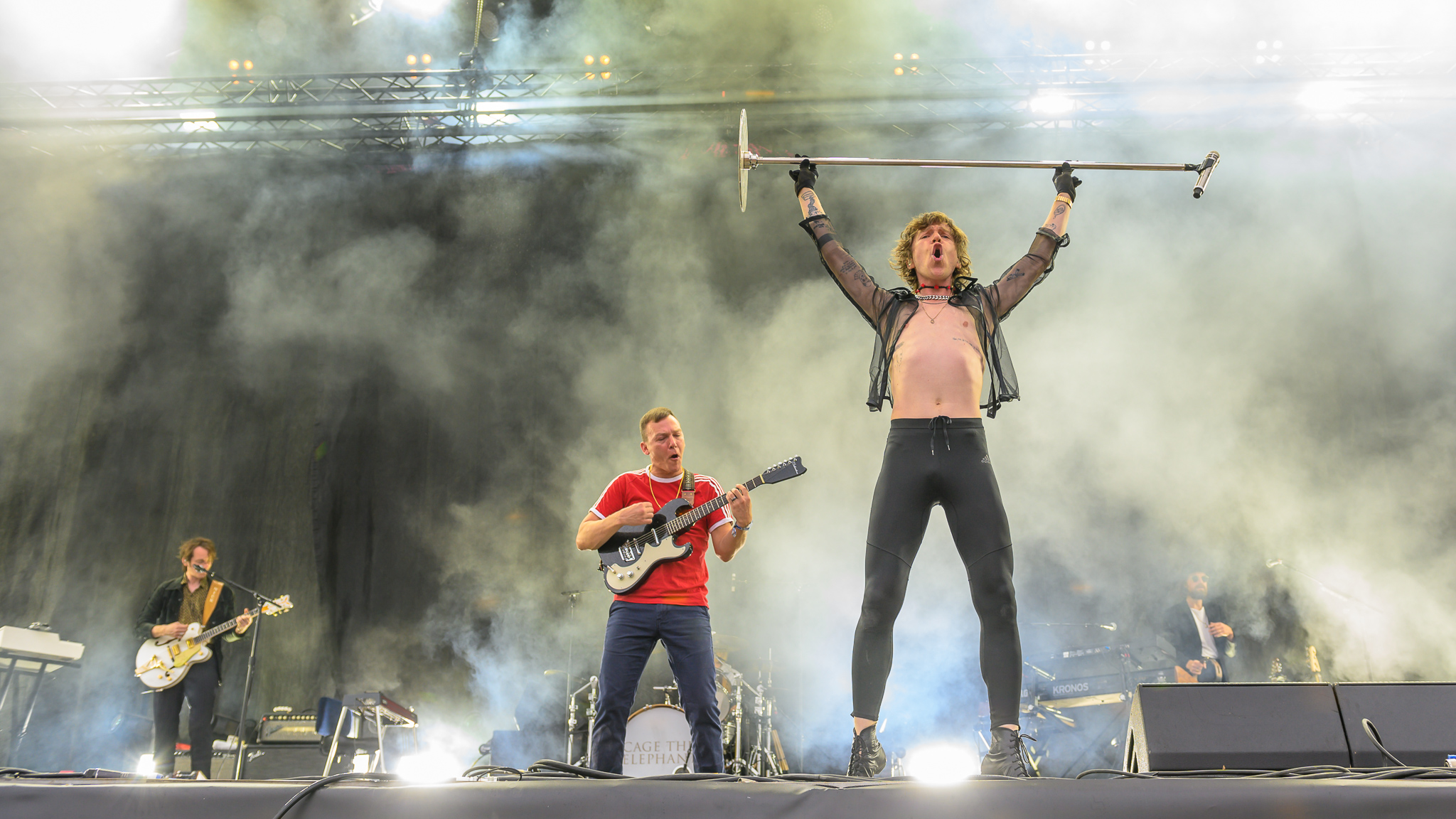
- Cage the Elephant performing in 2019
- Studio albums: 6
- Extended plays: 2
- Live albums: 2
- Singles: 22
- Music videos: 23

The discography of American rock band Cage the Elephant consists of six studio albums, two live albums, 22 singles and 23 music videos. The band released their self-titled debut album in June 2008. It peaked at number 59 on the United States Billboard 200 and at number 18 on the Billboard Top Alternative Albums chart. The album has been certified platinum by the Recording Industry Association of America (RIAA). "Ain't No Rest for the Wicked", the album's third single, peaked at number 83 on the Billboard Hot 100 and became a top 50 hit in Canada and the United Kingdom. The singles "In One Ear" and "Back Against the Wall" both topped the Billboard Alternative Songs chart.

Thank You, Happy Birthday, the band's second studio album, was released in January 2011. It peaked at number two on the Billboard 200, as well as on the Top Alternative Albums and Top Rock Albums charts. "Shake Me Down", the album's lead single, peaked at number 78 on the Billboard Hot 100 and became the band's third number-one hit on the Alternative Songs chart and its first on the Canadian Rock Charts. The album's remaining singles—"Around My Head" and "Aberdeen" both entered the latter chart, as did album track "Always Something." The album has been certified gold by the RIAA. In 2012 they released their first live album Live from the Vic in Chicago which peaked at number 6 on the Music Video Sales chart.

Their third album Melophobia (2013) peaked at number 15 on the Billboard 200 and number 6 on the Top Alternative Albums and Top Rock Albums. In 2015 the album was nominated for Best Alternative Music Album at that years Grammys. It featured hit singles such as "Cigarette Daydreams" and "Come a Little Closer" both peaking a number one on the Alternative songs chart. It has since been certified platinum by the Recording Industry Association of America (RIAA).

In 2015, they released their fourth studio album Tell Me I'm Pretty. The songs "Mess Around", "Trouble" both topped the Alternative airplay with the ladder also topping the Canadian Rock Charts. It peaked at number 26 on the Billboard 200 and number 3 on both Top Alternative Albums and Top Rock Albums. The album won the band their first Grammy in the Best Rock Album category at the 59th Annual Grammy Awards. It has been certified gold by the RIAA. In 2017 they released their second live album titled Unpeeled which peaked at number 61 on the Billboard 200, and 9 on the US Top Alternative Albums

On November 26, 2018, they announced their fifth studio album, Social Cues, which was released on April 19, 2019. The albums peaked at number 21 on the US Billboard 200 along with charting in 11 other countries outside the US which is the most in the band’s history. It featured popular singles such as Ready to Let Go, Skin and Bones and the title track Social Cues which all peaked at number one on the Alternative songs chart. The album also took home best Rock Album at the 62nd Annual Grammy Awards.

On May 17, 2024, they released their sixth studio album Neon Pill. The album peaked at number 57 on the Billboard 200, number 7 on Top Alternative Albums and number 12 on the Top Rock Albums chart. The album also featured three singles: "Rainbow", "Metaverse" and "Neon Pill", the latter topping the Alternative Airplay chart. The title track was nominated for Best Alternative Music performance at the 67th Annual Grammy Awards.

== Albums ==
=== Studio albums ===
List of studio albums, with selected chart positions, sales figures and certifications
Title	Album details	Peak chart positions										Certifications
Title	Album details	US	AUS	AUT	CAN	FRA	NLD	POR	SCO	SWI	UK	Certifications
Cage the Elephant	Released: June 23, 2008 (UK); March 24, 2009 (US); Label: Jive; Formats: CD, LP, digital download	59	—	—	69	—	—	—	62	—	38	RIAA: Platinum; BPI: Silver
Thank You, Happy Birthday	Released: January 11, 2011 (US); Label: Jive; Formats: CD, LP, digital download	2	—	—	7	—	—	—	31	—	26	RIAA: Gold
Melophobia	Released: October 8, 2013 (US); Label: RCA; Formats: CD, LP, digital download	15	— (Note: Melophobia did not enter the Australian ARIA Albums Chart but peaked at number four on the ARIA Hitseekers Chart.)	—	21	—	—	—	—	—	117	RIAA: Platinum; PMB: Gold
Tell Me I'm Pretty	Released: December 18, 2015 (US); Label: RCA; Formats: CD, LP, digital download	26	— (Note: Tell Me I'm Pretty did not enter the Australian ARIA Albums Chart but peaked at number three on the ARIA Hitseekers Chart.)	—	30	—	—	—	—	—	135	RIAA: Gold
Social Cues	Released: April 19, 2019 (US); Label: RCA; Formats: CD, LP, digital download	21	77	47	21	146	59	31	22	38	79	
Neon Pill	Released: May 17, 2024 (US); Label: RCA; Formats: CD, LP, digital download	57	—	—	—	198	—	67	47	—	— (Note: Neon Pill did not enter the UK Albums Chart, but peaked at number 51 on the UK Albums Sales Chart.)	
"—" denotes a recording that did not chart or was not released in that territory.

=== Live albums ===
List of live albums
Title	Album details	Peak chart positions				
Title	Album details	US	US Alt.	US Rock	CAN	NZ Heat
Live from the Vic in Chicago	Released: January 17, 2012 (US); Label: RCA; Formats: Digital download, LP	— (Note: "Live from the Vic in Chicago" did not enter the Billboard 200, but peaked at number six on the Music Video Sales chart.)	—	—	—	—
Unpeeled	Released: July 28, 2017 (US); Label: RCA; Formats: CD, LP, digital download	61	9	11	50	10
"—" denotes a recording that did not chart or was not released in that territory.

== Extended plays ==
List of extended plays
Title	Details
Live at Grimey's	Released: April 17, 2010 (US); Label: Jive; Formats: CD
Deep Hands: Live Session	Released: October 6, 2014; Label: RCA; Formats: digital download

== Singles ==
List of singles, with selected chart positions and certifications, showing year released and album name
Title	Year	Peak chart positions										Certifications	Album
Title	Year	US	US Rock	AUS	CAN	CAN Rock	ICE	JPN	MEX Air.	SCO	UK	Certifications	Album
"In One Ear"	2008	— (Note: "In One Ear" did not enter the Billboard Hot 100, but peaked at number 95 on the US Airplay Top 100 chart.)	3	—	—	24	—	—	—	9	51	RIAA: Platinum	Cage the Elephant
"Ain't No Rest for the Wicked"	2008	83	6	99	42	2	—	90	—	24	32	RIAA: 8× Platinum; BPI: Platinum	Cage the Elephant
"Back Against the Wall"	2009	— (Note: "Back Against the Wall" did not enter the Billboard Hot 100, but peaked at number 44 on the Heatseekers Songs chart.)	12	—	56	2	—	—	—	33	127	RIAA: Platinum	Cage the Elephant
"Shake Me Down"	2010	78	1	—	51	1	—	—	—	56	55	RIAA: Platinum	Thank You, Happy Birthday
"Around My Head"	2011	—	27	—	—	36	—	—	41	—	—	RIAA: Gold	Thank You, Happy Birthday
"Aberdeen"	2011	—	22	—	—	24	—	—	40	—	—		Thank You, Happy Birthday
"Come a Little Closer"	2013	— (Note: "Come a Little Closer" did not enter the Billboard Hot 100, but peaked at number seven on the Bubbling Under Hot 100 Singles chart.)	15	—	72	2	—	—	41	—	— (Note: "Come a Little Closer" did not enter the UK Singles Chart, but peaked at number 37 on the UK Physical Singles Chart.)	RIAA: 3× Platinum; BPI: Silver	Melophobia
"Take It or Leave It"	2014	— (Note: "Take It or Leave It" did not enter the Billboard Hot 100, but peaked at number 17 on the Hot Singles Sales chart.)	46	—	—	26	—	—	39	—	—	RIAA: Gold	Melophobia
"Cigarette Daydreams"	2014	— (Note: "Cigarette Daydreams" did not enter the Billboard Hot 100, but peaked at number two on the Bubbling Under Hot 100 Singles chart.)	9	—	—	6	—	—	—	—	—	RIAA: 5× Platinum; BPI: Platinum	Melophobia
"Mess Around"	2015	—	16	—	93	1	—	—	—	—	—	RIAA: Gold	Tell Me I'm Pretty
"Trouble"	2016	—	12	—	—	9	—	—	—	—	—	RIAA: 2× Platinum	Tell Me I'm Pretty
"Cold Cold Cold"	2017	—	22	—	—	4	—	—	49	—	—	RIAA: Platinum; AMPROFON: Gold	Tell Me I'm Pretty
"Whole Wide World"	2017	—	25	—	—	17	—	—	—	—	—		Unpeeled
"Ready to Let Go"	2019	—	7	—	— (Note: "Ready to Let Go" did not enter the Billboard Canadian Hot 100, but peaked at number 45 on the Canadian All-format Airplay chart.)	1	6	—	—	—	—	RIAA: Gold; MC: Gold	Social Cues
"Social Cues"	2019	—	5	—	—	5	—	—	—	—	—	RIAA: Gold	Social Cues
"Black Madonna"	2020	—	10	—	—	19	—	—	—	—	—		Social Cues
"Skin and Bones"	2020	—	31	—	—	16	40	—	—	—	—		Social Cues
"Neon Pill"	2024	—	31	—	—	2	—	—	—	—	—		Neon Pill
"Metaverse"	2024	—	— (Note: "Metaverse" did not enter the Hot Rock & Alternative Songs chart, but peaked at number six on the Rock & Alternative Airplay chart.)	—	—	9	—	—	—	—	—		Neon Pill
"Rainbow"	2024	—	40	—	—	4	—	—	—	—	—		Neon Pill
"Beaches in Tennessee"	2026	—	34	—	—	1	—	—	—	—	—		Dying in Reverse
"Dying in Reverse"	2026	—	—	—	—	—	—	—	—	—	—		Dying in Reverse
"Make It Easy"	2026	—	— (Note: "Make It Easy" did not enter the Hot Rock & Alternative Songs chart, but peaked at number 41 on the Rock & Alternative Airplay chart.)	—	—	—	—	—	—	—	—		Dying in Reverse
"—" denotes a recording that did not chart or was not released in that territory.

=== Promotional singles ===
List of promotional singles, with selected chart positions, showing year released and album name
Title	Year	Peak chart positions			Album
Title	Year	US Alt. DL	US Rock	BEL (FL)	Album
"Free Love"	2007	—	—	—	Cage the Elephant
"2024"	2010	—	—	—	Thank You, Happy Birthday
"Right Before My Eyes"	2012	—	—	—	Thank You, Happy Birthday
"Cry Baby"	2016	—	—	—	Tell Me I'm Pretty
"House of Glass"	2019	—	—	—	Social Cues
"Night Running" (with Beck)	2019	—	29	—	Social Cues
"Goodbye"	2019	—	35	—	Social Cues
"Broken Boy" (featuring Iggy Pop)	2020	22	— (Note: "Broken Boy" did not enter the Hot Rock Songs chart, but peaked at number 20 on the Rock Digital Songs chart.)	— (Note: "Broken Boy" did not enter the Flanders Ultratop 50, but charted as an "extra tip" on the Ultratip chart.)	Non-album single
"The Unforgiven"	2021	—	—	—	The Metallica Blacklist
"Out Loud"	2024	—	—	—	Neon Pill
"Good Time"	2024	—	—	—	Neon Pill
"—" denotes a recording that did not chart or was not released in that territory.

== Other charted and certified songs ==
List of songs, with selected chart positions and certifications, showing year released and album name
Title	Year	Peak chart positions			Certifications	Album
Title	Year	US Alt. Air.	US Rock	MEX Air.	Certifications	Album
"Always Something"	2012	39	—	—		Thank You, Happy Birthday
"Telescope"	2013	—	—	—	RIAA: Gold	Melophobia
"Spiderhead"	2014	—	—	50	RIAA: Gold	Melophobia
"Too Late to Say Goodbye"	2016	—	44	—		Tell Me I'm Pretty
"—" denotes a recording that did not chart or was not released in that territory.

== Guest appearances ==
List of non-single guest appearances, showing year released and album name
Title	Year	Album
"The Lonesome Death of Hattie Carroll"	2012	Chimes of Freedom
“The Unforgiven”	2021	The Metallica Blacklist

== Music videos ==
List of music videos, showing year released and directors
Title	Year	Director(s)
"In One Ear" (version 1)	2008	—N/a
"In One Ear" (version 2)	2008	D.A.R.Y.L.
"Ain't No Rest for the Wicked"	2008	D.A.R.Y.L.
"Back Against the Wall"	2009	Isaac Rentz
"In One Ear" (version 3)	2010	Isaac Rentz
"Shake Me Down"	2011	Isaac Rentz
"Flow"	2011	—N/a
"Around My Head"	2011	Chris Marrs Piliero
"Aberdeen"	2011	Isaac Rentz
"Come a Little Closer"	2013	Matt Shultz
"Take It or Leave It"	2014	Isaac Rentz
"Cigarette Daydreams"	2014	Mark Pellington
"Mess Around"	2015	Georges Méliès
"Cry Baby"	2016	—N/a
"Trouble"	2016	Matthew Shultz & Juliette Buchs Shultz
"Cold Cold Cold"	2017	Matthew Shultz
"Ready to Let Go"	2019	Matthew Shultz
"Night Running"	2019	Jennifer Juniper Stratford
"Social Cues"	2019	Matthew Shultz
"Black Madonna"	2020	Matthew Shultz
"Neon Pill"	2024	Loris Russier
"Out Loud"	2024	Loris Russier
"Beaches In Tennessee"	2026	Matthew Shultz
