= Neon Pill Tour =

2024–2025 concert tour by Cage the Elephant

- Tour by Cage the Elephant
- Promotional poster for the tour
- Location: Europe; North America
- Associated album: Neon Pill
- Start date: June 20, 2024
- End date: February 26, 2025
- Legs: 2
- No. of shows: 56
- Box office: 25 million

Cage the Elephant concert chronology
- Night Running Tour (2019); Neon Pill (2024–2025); Fall Tour (2025)

The Neon Pill Tour was a headlining concert tour by American alternative rock band Cage the Elephant, in support of their sixth studio album Neon Pill. The tour began on June 20, 2024, and lasted till February 26, 2025 spanning 56 dates across North America and Europe.

== Overview ==
On February 29, 2024, Cage the Elephant announced the 47 date North American leg of the tour with Young the Giant and Bakar serving as support on select dates. On November 11, 2024, they announced additional tour dates in Europe in 2025 alongside Sunflower Bean and Girl Tones. During the tour Cage the Elephant also made an appearance on The Tonight Show Starring Jimmy Fallon, playing their song "Rainbow".

In early August 2024, lead singer Matt Shultz broke his foot while performing, this led to him performing on a scooter for the remainder of the tour.

== Commercial performance ==
The Neon Pill Tour was a success for the band becoming the highest grossing of their career, with sales of over 440,000 tickets, generating $25 million, including multiple sold out shows in cities such as Seattle, Vancouver, Santa Barbara, Austin, Chicago, and Montreal, as well as California’s Kia Forum and Colorado’s Red Rocks Amphitheatre.

== Reception ==
The tour was met with positive reception Holy Gustavsen writing for Boston University stated "With just lights and the occasional flame to decorate the stage, the band’s performance really shined. Even if you only know "Cigarette Daydreams" or "Ain’t No Rest for the Wicked", you should try to see Cage the Elephant live, and expect to leave a bigger fan than when you arrived."

Commenting on lead singer Matt Shultz performance while injured the Aquarian wrote "Cage the Elephant’s frontman, Matt Shultz was rocking out on the stage as expected, but rolling in a more literal sense than ever before. Due to his broken foot, the singer was on a mobility knee walker, which did nothing to affect his stage presence, and did everything to make the night even more impressive."

== Setlist ==
The tours setlist consisted typically consisted of 3-4 songs of Neon Pill with the rest of the songs coming off their previous albums.

The following set list was performed in Cleveland, Ohio, and is not intended to be representative of the entirety of the shows on the tour.

1. "Broken Boy"
2. "Cry Baby"
3. "Spiderhead"
4. "Too Late to Say Goodbye"
5. "Good Time"
6. "Cold Cold Cold"
7. "Ready to Let Go"
8. "Neon Pill"
9. "Social Cues"
10. "Halo"
11. "Mess Around"
12. "Trouble"
13. "Ain’t No Rest for the Wicked"
14. "Skin and Bones"
15. "Rainbow"
16. "Telescope"
17. "House of Glass"
18. "Back Against the Wall"
19. "In One Ear"
20. "Sabertooth Tiger"
  Encore
21. "Shake Me Down"
22. "Cigarette Daydreams"
23. "Come a Little Closer"

== Tour dates ==
| Date | City | Country | Venue |
North American Leg supported by: Young the Giant, Bakar
| June 20, 2024 | Salt Lake City | United States | FCU Amphitheater |
| June 22, 2024 | Seattle | United States | Climate Pledge Arena |
| June 23, 2024 | Ridgefield | United States | RV Inn Style Resorts |
| June 24, 2024 | Bend | United States | Hayden Homes Amphitheater |
| June 26, 2024 | Vancouver | Canada | Rodger’s Arena |
| June 28, 2024 | Edmonton | Canada | Rogers Place |
| June 30, 2024 | Spokane | United States | BECU Live at Northern Quest |
| July 2, 2024 | San Francisco | United States | Bill Graham Civic Auditorium |
| July 3, 2024 | Santa Barbara | United States | Santa Barbara Bowl |
| July 5, 2024 | Phoenix | United States | Talking Stick Resort Amphitheater |
| July 6, 2024 | San Diego | United States | The Viejas Arena |
| July 7, 2024 | Los Angeles | United States | Kia Forum |
| July 9, 2024 | Albuquerque | United States | Isleta Amphitheater |
| July 11, 2024 | Austin | United States | Moody Center |
| July 12, 2024 | Houston | United States | Cynthia Woods Mitchell Pavilion |
| July 13, 2024 | Fort Worth | United States | Dickies Arena |
| July 15, 2024 | Rogers | United States | Walmart AMP |
| August 2, 2024 | Alpharetta | United States | Ameris Bank Amphitheater |
| August 3, 2024 | Raleigh | United States | The Costal Credit Union Music Park |
| August 4, 2024 | Charlotte | United States | PNC Music Pavillion |
| August 7, 2024 | Noblesville | United States | Ruoff Music Center |
| August 8, 2024 | Madison | United States | Breese Stevens Field |
| August 10, 2024 | Winnipeg | Canada | Canada Life Centre |
| August 12, 2024 | Minneapolis | United States | Target Center |
| August 14, 2024 | Chicago | United States | Credit Union 1 Arena |
| August 16, 2024 | Grand Rapids | United States | Van Andel Arena |
| August 18, 2024 | Saratoga Springs | United States | Broadview Stage at SPAC |
| August 19, 2024 | Bridgeport | United States | Hartford HealthCare Amphitheater |
| August 21, 2024 | Gilford | United States | BankNH Pavillion |
| August 22, 2024 | Mansfield | United States | Xfinity Center |
| August 24, 2024 | Holmdel | United States | PNC Bank Arts Center |
| August 26, 2024 | Montreal | Canada | Bell Centre |
| August 27, 2024 | Toronto | Canada | Budweiser Stage |
| August 29, 2024 | Burgettstown | United States | The Pavilion at Star Lake |
| August 30, 2024 | Cincinnati | United States | Riverbend Music Center |
| September 5, 2024 | New York | United States | Madison Square Garden |
| September 6, 2024 | Philadelphia | United States | TD Pavilion at the Mann |
| September 7, 2024 | Buffalo | United States | Artpark Mainstage Theater |
| September 9, 2024 | Cleveland | United States | Blossom Music Center |
| September 10, 2024 | Detroit | United States | Pine Knob Music Theatre |
| September 12, 2024 | St. Louis | United States | Hollywood Casino Amphitheater |
| September 13, 2024 | Des Moines | United States | Wells Fargo Arena |
| September 14, 2024 | Kansas City | United States | Starlight Theatre |
| September 16, 2024 | Omaha | United States | CHI Center Health Center |
| September 18, 2024 | Morrison | United States | Red Rocks Amphitheater |
| September 27, 2024 | Ocean City | United States | Oceans Calling |
European Leg supported by: Sunflower Bean and Girl Tones
| February 13, 2025 | Glasgow | Scotland | 02 Academy Glasgow |
| February 14, 2025 | Manchester | England | O2 Apollo Manchester |
| February 16, 2025 | Wolverhampton | England | University of Wolverhampton |
| February 17, 2025 | London | England | 02 Academy Brixton |
| February 20, 2025 | Cologne | Germany | Palladium |
| February 21, 2025 | Berlin | Germany | Columbiahalle |
| February 23, 2025 | Amsterdam | Netherlands | AFAS Live |
| February 24, 2025 | Brussels | Belgium | Ancienne Belgique |
| February 26, 2025 | Paris | France | Zenith |

== Opening acts ==
=== 2024 ===
- Willow Avalon (all dates on North American leg)
- Bakar (all dates on North American leg)
- Young the Giant (all dates on North American leg)

=== 2025 ===
- Sunflower Bean (all dates on European leg)
- Girl Tones (all dates on European leg)

== Personnel ==
- Matt Shultz – vocals
- Brad Shultz – guitar
- Nick Bockrath – guitar
- Matthan Minster – piano, backing vocals
- Daniel Tichenor – bass
- Jared Champion – drums
