= Unpeeled (Cage the Elephant album) =

Live album by Cage the Elephant
- Released: July 28, 2017
- Genre: Rock
- Length: 79:15
- Label: RCA
- Producer: Ben Baptie, Cage the Elephant

Cage the Elephant chronology
Tell Me I'm Pretty (2015)	Unpeeled (2017)	Social Cues (2019)

Singles from Unpeeled
- 1. "Whole Wide World" Released: June 21, 2017; 2. "Sweetie Little Jean" Released: July 7, 2017; 3. "Rubber Ball" Released: July 21, 2017; 4. "Cry Baby" Released: August 25, 2017

Professional ratings
Aggregate scores
Source	Rating
Metacritic	72/100
Review scores
Source	Rating
AllMusic	4/5 stars
Rolling Stone	3/5 stars
The Skinny	3/5 stars
Under The Radar	8/10

Unpeeled is the second live album by American rock band Cage the Elephant. The album was released on July 28, 2017, and features the single "Whole Wide World". The album was recorded on tour during their "Live and Unpeeled" shows in cities such as Los Angeles, Washington DC, Nashville, and Knoxville where the band performed stripped-down renditions of some of the rock band's most beloved songs. The album has 21 tracks: 18 curated songs from past albums and three cover versions, including the lead single.

Guitarist Brad Shultz explained: "We connected with the songs in a way we hadn't before. It was really all about the balance of the intimacy and the delicacy of how we approach playing these songs live acoustically and with strings as we hadn't done before."

== Singles ==
"Whole Wide World", the cover of a song by Wreckless Eric, was the first single of the album and was released on June 21, 2017. A music video for the song was released the following day on June 22, and features the band playing live. A music video on July 7, 2017, for "Sweetie Little Jean" was released.

== Recording ==
Unpeeled produced by RCA Records, doesn't sound like a traditional live album. The reworkings are polished and sound as if it was recorded in a studio. The three covers on the album, include The Stranglers' "Golden Brown", Daft Punk's "Instant Crush" and "Whole Wide World" by Wreckless Eric. It was recorded to show how versatile their music can be. The band describes the acoustic covers accompanied with string, and a choir as "refreshing" and a fun "change in pace". It was recorded while the band was on tour during their "live and unpeeled" shows in Los Angeles, Washington DC, Nashville and Knoxville.

== Critical reception ==
Unpeeled received high reviews from music critics. According to review aggregator Metacritic, the album has an average critic review score of 72/100, based on 4 reviews. Writing for Under the Radar, Matt Raven describes the album as "daring" and states that "These new versions demonstrate the band's uncanny ability to construct alluring compositions that all start from a strong melodic framework."

== Track listing ==
All tracks are written by Cage the Elephant unless otherwise noted.

Unpeeled
No.	Title	Length
1.	"Cry Baby"	4:20
2.	"Whole Wide World" (Eric Goulden)	3:25
3.	"Sweetie Little Jean"	3:26
4.	"Spiderhead"	3:34
5.	"Take It or Leave It"	3:24
6.	"Too Late to Say Goodbye"	3:52
7.	"Punchin' Bag"	3:25
8.	"Shake Me Down"	3:26
9.	"Telescope"	3:51
10.	"Instant Crush" (Thomas Bangalter, Julian Casablancas, Guy-Manuel de Homem-Christo)	5:09
11.	"Trouble"	4:02
12.	"Ain't No Rest for the Wicked"	2:59
13.	"Rubber Ball"	3:55
14.	"Aberdeen"	2:53
15.	"Golden Brown" (Hugh Cornwell, Jean-Jacques Burnel, Dave Greenfield, Jet Black)	3:57
16.	"Cold Cold Cold"	3:27
17.	"How Are You True"	4:39
18.	"Come a Little Closer"	3:45
19.	"Back Against the Wall"	3:45
20.	"Cigarette Daydreams"	3:26
21.	"Right Before My Eyes"	4:40
Total length:		79:21

== Credits ==
Cage the Elephant

- Matt Shultz – lead vocals, acoustic guitar
- Brad Shultz – acoustic guitar
- Jared Champion – drums
- Daniel Tichenor – bass, acoustic guitar
- Nick Bockrath – acoustic guitar, pedal steel guitar, backing vocals, string arrangements

Additional musicians

- Emma Kleinberg Singers – choir
- Matthan Minster – keyboards, acoustic guitar, percussion, vibraphone, backing vocals
- Kyle Davis – additional percussion
- Gina Corso, Carl Larson, Avery Bright, Emily Nelson, Alexander F. Grimes, Kristin Weber, Austin Hoke, Andrea Vogt, Ryan Knotl, Preston Barbare, Natalie Spehar, Michael Polonchak, Kaitlin Moreno, Charles Callahan – strings

== Charts ==
Chart (2017)	Peak position
Canadian Albums (Billboard)	50
New Zealand Heatseekers Albums (RMNZ)	10
US Billboard 200	61
US Top Alternative Albums (Billboard)	9
US Top Rock Albums (Billboard)	11
