= List of Billboard number-one adult alternative singles of the 2010s =

Adult Alternative Airplay, also known as Triple A, is a record chart that ranks the most-played songs on American adult album alternative radio stations. Currently published by the music industry magazine Billboard, the chart is formulated based on electronically monitored airplay data compiled by Nielsen Broadcast Data Systems. from a panel of 32 stations. It was introduced in January 1996 as a feature in Radio & Records magazine, which was later purchased by Billboard parent company Nielsen. Billboard appropriated the Radio & Records adult alternative chart in July 2008 and became its sole publisher after Radio & Records ceased publication in June 2009. The first number-one single of the 2010s on the Adult Alternative Songs chart was "Chasing Pirates" by American recording artist Norah Jones, which spent six weeks at the top spot from December 2009 to January 2010.

== Number-one singles ==
Key
† – Billboard year-end number-one single (Note: George Ezra's "Blame It on Me" peaked at number two on the chart dated July 4, 2015, but was ranked the number-one single of that year.)
↑ – Return of a single to number one

Single	Artist	Reached number one	Weeks at number one
"Chasing Pirates"	Norah Jones	December 26, 2009	6
"Just Breathe"	Pearl Jam	February 6, 2010	13
"Kandi" †	One Eskimo	May 8, 2010	1
"You and Your Heart"	Jack Johnson	May 15, 2010	11
"The Sound of Sunshine"	Michael Franti & Spearhead	July 31, 2010	8
"Beg, Steal or Borrow"	Ray LaMontagne and the Pariah Dogs	September 25, 2010	6
"At or with Me"	Jack Johnson	November 6, 2010	2
"Angel Dance"	Robert Plant	November 20, 2010	2
"Radioactive"	Kings of Leon	December 4, 2010	7
"Dog Days Are Over"	Florence and the Machine	January 22, 2011	3
"Rolling in the Deep" †	Adele	February 12, 2011	14
"You Are a Tourist"	Death Cab for Cutie	May 21, 2011	8
"Every Teardrop Is a Waterfall"	Coldplay	July 16, 2011	3
"Rumour Has It"	Adele	July 9, 2011	1
"Every Teardrop Is a Waterfall" ↑	Coldplay	July 16, 2011	4
"The Adventures of Raindance Maggie"	Red Hot Chili Peppers	September 10, 2011	3
"Lost in My Mind"	The Head and the Heart	October 1, 2011	2
"Paradise"	Coldplay	October 15, 2011	8
"Lucky Now"	Ryan Adams	December 10, 2011	1
"Lonely Boy"	The Black Keys	December 17, 2011	7
"Shake It Out"	Florence and the Machine	February 4, 2012	3
"Somebody That I Used to Know" †	Gotye featuring Kimbra	February 25, 2012	13
"Little Talks"	Of Monsters and Men	May 26, 2012	4
"Hold On"	Alabama Shakes	June 23, 2012	1
"Ho Hey"	The Lumineers	June 30, 2012	8
"Mercy"	Dave Matthews Band	August 25, 2012	2
"I Will Wait"	Mumford & Sons	September 8, 2012	11
"Home"	Phillip Phillips	November 24, 2012	6
"Stubborn Love" †	The Lumineers	January 5, 2013	4
"Mountain Sound"	Of Monsters and Men	February 2, 2013	1
"Stubborn Love" ↑ †	The Lumineers	February 9, 2013	4
"Mountain Sound" ↑	Of Monsters and Men	March 9, 2013	2
"Lover of the Light"	Mumford & Sons	March 23, 2013	4
"Hero"	Family of the Year	April 20, 2013	2
"Gone, Gone, Gone"	Phillip Phillips	May 4, 2013	1
"Stompa"	Serena Ryder	May 11, 2013	8
"Red Hands"	Walk off the Earth	July 6, 2013	4
"Recovery"	Frank Turner	August 3, 2013	2
"I Got You"	Jack Johnson	August 17, 2013	2
"Royals"	Lorde	August 31, 2013	8
"Wake Me Up"	Avicii	October 26, 2013	4
"Sirens"	Pearl Jam	November 23, 2013	3
"Let Her Go"	Passenger	December 14, 2013	4
"Pompeii"	Bastille	January 11, 2014	4
"Team"	Lorde	February 8, 2014	4
"Come a Little Closer"	Cage the Elephant	March 8, 2014	2
"Invisible"	U2	March 22, 2014	2
"Blue Moon"	Beck	April 5, 2014	2
"Magic"	Coldplay	April 19, 2014	1
"Fever" †	The Black Keys	April 26, 2014	10
"Stay with Me"	Sam Smith	July 5, 2014	6
"Take Me to Church"	Hozier	August 16, 2014	1
"Stolen Dance"	Milky Chance	August 23, 2014	8
"Do You"	Spoon	October 18, 2014	2
"Gotta Get Away"	The Black Keys	November 1, 2014	2
"Do You" ↑	Spoon	November 15, 2014	1
"The Miracle (of Joey Ramone)"	U2	November 22, 2014	2
"Budapest"	George Ezra	December 6, 2014	10
"Make You Better"	The Decemberists	February 14, 2015	1
"I Bet My Life"	Imagine Dragons	February 21, 2015	1
"Lampshades on Fire"	Modest Mouse	February 28, 2015	4
"Black Sun"	Death Cab for Cutie	March 28, 2015	2
"Believe"	Mumford & Sons	April 11, 2015	5
"What Kind of Man"	Florence and the Machine	May 16, 2015	3
"Crystals"	Of Monsters and Men	June 6, 2015	3
"Sedona"	Houndmouth	June 27, 2015	2
"Dreams"	Beck	July 11, 2015	12
"Ship to Wreck"	Florence and the Machine	October 3, 2015	3
"S.O.B."	Nathaniel Rateliff and the Night Sweats	October 24, 2015	4
"Hello"	Adele	November 21, 2015	4
"Adventure of a Lifetime"	Coldplay	December 19, 2015	1
"Fire and the Flood"	Vance Joy	December 26, 2015	1
"Adventure of a Lifetime" ↑	Coldplay	January 2, 2016	1
"Fire and the Flood" ↑	Vance Joy	January 9, 2016	1
"Adventure of a Lifetime" ↑	Coldplay	January 16, 2016	3
"Mess Around"	Cage the Elephant	February 6, 2016	2
"Adventure of a Lifetime" ↑	Coldplay	February 20, 2016	1
"Smooth Sailin'"	Leon Bridges	February 27, 2016	2
"Pretty Pimpin"	Kurt Vile	March 12, 2016	1
"Ophelia"†	The Lumineers	March 19, 2016	11
"Off the Ground"	The Record Company	June 4, 2016	2
"Dark Necessities"	Red Hot Chili Peppers	June 18, 2016	2
"Ain't No Man"	The Avett Brothers	July 2, 2016	5
"All We Ever Knew"	The Head and the Heart	August 6, 2016	8
"Wish I Knew You"	The Revivalists	October 1, 2016	2
"White Flag"	Joseph	October 15, 2016	1
"Waste a Moment"	Kings of Leon	October 22, 2016	14
"Shine"	Mondo Cozmo	January 28, 2017	1
"Waste a Moment" ↑	Kings of Leon	February 4, 2017	1
"Human"	Rag'n'Bone Man	February 11, 2017	5
"Hot Thoughts"	Spoon	March 18, 2017	7
"Feel It Still"†	Portugal. The Man	May 6, 2017	9
"Shine on Me"	Dan Auerbach	July 8, 2017	1
"Feel It Still"↑†	Portugal. The Man	July 15, 2017	2
"Everything Now"	Arcade Fire	July 29, 2017	2
"The System Only Dreams in Total Darkness"	The National	August 12, 2017	2
"Everything Now"↑	Arcade Fire	August 26, 2017	4
"The Man"	The Killers	September 23, 2017	1
"Lay It on Me"	Vance Joy	September 30, 2017	3
"You're the Best Thing About Me"	U2	October 21, 2017	7
"Up All Night"	Beck	December 9, 2017	2
"All on My Mind"	Anderson East	December 23, 2017	1
"No Roots"	Alice Merton	December 30, 2017	4
"Pain"	The War on Drugs	January 20, 2018	1
"Live in the Moment"	Portugal. The Man	January 27, 2018	2
"You Worry Me"†	Nathaniel Rateliff and the Night Sweats	February 10, 2018	9
"Severed"	The Decemberists	April 14, 2018	2
"Lottery"	Jade Bird	April 28, 2018	3
"Bad Bad News"	Leon Bridges	May 19, 2018	5
"Hunger"	Florence and the Machine	June 23, 2018	4
"Life to Fix"	The Record Company	July 21, 2018	1
"Gold Rush"	Death Cab for Cutie	July 28, 2018	8
"All My Friends"	The Revivalists	September 22, 2018	3
"Shame"	Elle King	October 13, 2018	1
"Nina Cried Power"	Hozier featuring Mavis Staples	October 20, 2018	2
"Guiding Light"	Mumford and Sons	November 3, 2018	10
"Light On"	Maggie Rogers	January 12, 2019	3
"Hey Mama"	Nathaniel Rateliff and the Night Sweats	February 2, 2019	1
"Northern Lights"	Death Cab for Cutie	February 9, 2019	3
"Harmony Hall"	Vampire Weekend	March 2, 2019	4
"Ready to Let Go"	Cage the Elephant	March 30, 2019	1
"Harmony Hall" ↑	Vampire Weekend	April 6, 2019	3
"Lo/Hi"	The Black Keys	April 27, 2019	5
"Missed Connection" †	The Head and the Heart	June 1, 2019	1
"Gloria"	The Lumineers	June 8, 2019	5
"Alligator"	Of Monsters and Men	July 13, 2019	2
"This Life"	Vampire Weekend	July 27, 2019	1
"Go"	The Black Keys	August 3, 2019	9
"Social Cues"	Cage The Elephant	October 5, 2019	1
"Stay High"	Brittany Howard	October 12, 2019	3
"Peach Fuzz"	Caamp	November 2, 2019	3
"Life in the City"	The Lumineers	November 23, 2019	4
"Uneventful Days"	Beck	December 21, 2019	2
