= Social Cues =

Studio album by Cage the Elephant
- Released: April 19, 2019
- Recorded: 2018
- Studios: Battle Tapes (Nashville, Tennessee); Blackbird (Nashville, Tennessee); Sound Emporium (Nashville, Tennessee); The Village (Los Angeles, California)
- Genres: Art rock; garage rock; alternative rock
- Length: 44:35
- Label: RCA
- Producer: John Hill

Cage the Elephant chronology
Unpeeled (2017)	Social Cues (2019)	Neon Pill (2024)

Singles from Social Cues
- 1. "Ready to Let Go" Released: January 31, 2019; 2. "Social Cues" Released: July 6, 2019; 3. "Black Madonna" Released: January 14, 2020; 4. "Skin and Bones" Released: October 13, 2020

Social Cues is the fifth studio album by American rock band Cage the Elephant. Announced on January 31, 2019, the album was released on April 19, 2019. Social Cues won the award for Best Rock Album at the 62nd Annual Grammy Awards, making it the band's second album to win the award after Tell Me I'm Pretty.

== Background ==
On November 26, 2018, the band announced on Twitter that their new album was "Done. Mixed. Mastered." On January 31, 2019, the band officially released "Ready to Let Go", the first single from Social Cues. On March 8, 2019, "House of Glass", the second advance track from the album was released. A collaboration with Beck, "Night Running" was released on March 28, 2019. The final song released in advance of the album was "Goodbye", released on April 8, 2019. Many of the songs (Such as "Goodbye", "Ready to Let Go", and "Love's the Only Way") were based on the divorce that Matt Shultz went through with his ex-wife, Juliette Buchs. In an interview Shultz stated “A lot of the songs came from trying to process heartbreak and personal change,” he said, adding that writing the album became a way to “hide real stories inside fictional narratives.”

In another interview guitarist Brad Shultz described the album stating “We wanted to explore darker textures and cinematic elements,” calling Social Cues “a natural evolution” that still retained the band’s core energy.” “We always wanted this record to be cinematic,” “Like, dark cinema. Horror scores. John Carpenter.”

The album’s name reflects themes of social anxiety, perception, disillusionment, and how people read/misread each other in a social context. Shultz explores what it means to put on a public face and “perform,” while also dealing with deeply private feelings. Shultz described it as “unspoken legalism” in Western civilization, which he explains as “a drive to make judgments about your own behavior based on the smallest details of what someone else is doing.”

== Music and lyrical themes ==
Producer John Hill pushed the band toward cleaner, more atmospheric production, contrasting the raw, vintage sound of Tell Me I’m Pretty. He also pushed for them to step out of their comfort zone and build a world around each song. The sessions featured analog synthesizers, ambient effects, along with live band takes and studio experimentation. This once again led to the band having a completely different sound from their previous album. It also seen them exploring more intricate arrangements also bringing in influences like electronic pop, glam and even some reggae.

The band also brought in David Campbell, a well-known composer, arranger, and the father of the musician Beck, to contribute to Social Cues. That family connection eventually led to Beck himself stepping in and helping the group complete “Night Running”, a track they had been struggling to finish. Matt Shultz stated “We’d had it pretty close to completion,” “All the arrangements were finished, or most of it, the chorus was feeling pretty nice. We were just struggling to find a personality for the verses. Brad had a hunch that Beck would be the right person to find it, so he sent it off, not telling the rest of us. A day or two later Beck came back with verses, and it was just the right thing at the right time.”

Thematically, the record oscillates between bleak introspection and sonic vibrancy, a contrast often underscored by Shultz's lyrical ambiguity and vocal delivery. Tracks such as "Broken Boy" and "What I'm Becoming" delve into existential confusion, while others, like "Night Running", embrace a funk-driven surrealism that masks darker undertones. In interviews, Shultz emphasized the importance of engaging with the full emotional spectrum, resisting the pull of melodrama to instead "acknowledge all angles of emotion."—from frustration and anger, as in "Tokyo Smoke", to the quiet resignation and fragile hope of "Goodbye".

== Release and promotion ==
The first single "Ready to Let Go" was released on January 31, 2019, and was accompanied by an official music video directed by lead singer Matt Shultz. A music video for the title track "Social Cues" was released on October 24, 2019. Additional music videos were also made for the songs "Night Running" and "Black Madonna". The singles "Ready to Let Go" "Social Cues" and "Skin and Bones" all topped the Billboard Alternative Songs chart.

On May 4, 2019 Cage the Elephant performed the albums title track on Adult Swims FishCenter Live. During the Summer of 2019, the band went on "Night running tour" alongside Beck in support of the album.

The album it self peaked at number 21 on the Billboard 200, number 2 on the Top Rock Albums and number 3 on the Top Alternative Albums. On top of this it made the charts in 11 different countries.

== Reception ==
Professional ratings
Aggregate scores
Source	Rating
AnyDecentMusic?	6.7/10
Metacritic	75/100
Review scores
Source	Rating
AllMusic	3.5/5 stars
Consequence of Sound	B−
DIY	2/5 stars
The Independent	4/5 stars
The Line of Best Fit	4.5/10
NME	4/5 stars
The New York Times	4/5 stars
Rolling Stone	4/5 stars
The Skinny	3/5 stars
Under the Radar	8/10 stars

Social Cues received generally positive reviews upon its release. At Metacritic, which assigns a normalized rating of reviews from mainstream publications, it received a 75 out of 100 - indicating "generally favorable reviews". Social Cues has an average rating of 6.7 on AnyDecentMusic?. David Fricke writing for Rolling Stone gave the album a 4/5 stating “One of most promising rock bands, Cage the Elephant's singer Matt Shultz's life fell apart — and they made their best album yet.” Matt writing for Under The Radar gave the album a positive review calling it a “power-packed collection of raucous rhythms, bouncy beats, and rough riffs delivered with an emotional intensity akin to Cherry Glazerr, Wolf Alice, and The Kills.” “Social Cues has plenty of spectacular music to make it a 2019 Top 10 contender.” Stephen Thomas writing for AllMusic wrote “CTE wind up dampening the squalls of White Stripes, Strokes, and Pixies that defined their first decade of records, but that change also emphasizes how the group are at heart pop-pastiche artists, favoring style and sound over a finely honed song. Consequence of Sound added "Thematically, Social Cues centers on Shultz’s recent divorce from his wife, and much of the record carries a somber weight. Though exploring dark motifs is nothing novel for a band like Cage the Elephant, divorce is a new topic for Shultz. It’s from this perspective that this album feels most distinct from its predecessor."

Social Cues won Best Rock Album at the 62nd Annual Grammy Awards on January 26, 2020.

== Track listing ==
All tracks are written by Brad Shultz, Daniel Tichenor, Jared Champion, Matt Shultz, Matthan Minster & Nick Bockrath, except where noted.

Social Cues track listing
No.	Title	Writer(s)	Length
1.	"Broken Boy"	B. Shultz, Tichenor, Champion, M. Shultz, Minster, Bockrath, John Hill	2:43
2.	"Social Cues"	B. Shultz, Tichenor, Champion, M. Shultz, Minster, Bockrath, Hill	3:39
3.	"Black Madonna"		3:47
4.	"Night Running" (with Beck)	B. Shultz, Tichenor, Champion, M. Shultz, Minster, Bockrath, Beck Hansen, Natalie Belle Bergman	3:28
5.	"Skin and Bones"		3:16
6.	"Ready to Let Go"		3:08
7.	"House of Glass"		2:35
8.	"Love's the Only Way"		4:01
9.	"The War Is Over"		3:16
10.	"Dance Dance"	B. Shultz, Tichenor, Champion, M. Shultz, Minster, Bockrath, Hill	3:10
11.	"What I'm Becoming"		3:50
12.	"Tokyo Smoke"		3:26
13.	"Goodbye"		4:16
Total length:			44:35

== Personnel ==
Cage the Elephant

- Nick Bockrath – lead guitar, pedal steel guitar, lap steel guitar, keyboards, celeste, cello
- Jared Champion – drums, percussion
- Matthan Minster – piano, keyboards, rhythm guitar, vibraphone, backing vocals
- Brad Shultz – rhythm guitar, keyboards
- Matt Shultz – lead vocals, rhythm guitar
- Daniel Tichenor – bass

Additional musicians

- Elliot Bergman – horn
- Jacob Braun – cello
- Charlie Bisharat – violin
- David Campbell – string arrangements, conductor
- Matt Combs – cello, violin, viola
- Gina Corso – violin
- Kyle Davis – percussion
- Mario Deleon – violin
- Lisa Dodlinger – violin
- Andrew Duckles – viola
- Beck – vocals
- John Hill – keyboards
- Leah Katz – viola
- Ginger Murphy – cello
- Sara Parkins – violin
- Kerenza Peacock – violin
- Katie Schecter – backing vocals
- Dave Stone – bass
- Steve Trudell – string contractor
- The W. Crimm Singers – backing vocals

Production

- Rob Cohen – engineering
- Tom Elmhirst – mixing
- Jeremy Ferguson – engineering
- David Greenbaum – engineering
- John Hill – production
- Randy Merrill – mastering

== Charts ==
Chart performance for Social Cues
Chart (2019)	Peak position
Australia Albums (ARIA)	77
Austrian Albums (Ö3 Austria)	47
Belgian Albums (Ultratop Flanders)	72
Canadian Albums (Billboard)	21
Dutch Albums (Album Top 100)	59
French Albums (SNEP)	146
Lithuanian Albums (AGATA)	36
Portuguese Albums (AFP)	31
Scottish Albums (Official Charts)	22
Swiss Albums (Schweizer Hitparade)	38
UK Albums (Official Charts)	79
US Top Rock Albums (Billboard)	2
US Billboard 200	21
US Top Rock & Alternative Albums (Billboard)	2
