= Mess Around (Cage the Elephant song) =

Single by Cage the Elephant

from the album Tell Me I'm Pretty
- Released: October 29, 2015
- Recorded: Spring 2015
- Studio: Easy Eye Sound (Nashville, Tennessee)
- Length: 2:53
- Label: RCA
- Songwriters: Jared Champion; Brad Shultz; Matt Shultz; Daniel Tichenor
- Producer: Dan Auerbach

Cage the Elephant singles chronology
| "Cigarette Daydreams" (2014) | "Mess Around" (2015) | "Trouble" (2016) |

"Mess Around" is a song by American rock band Cage the Elephant. It was produced by Dan Auerbach of the Black Keys and was released as the lead single from the band's fourth studio album Tell Me I'm Pretty on October 29, 2015. It topped the Billboard Alternative Songs chart in the United States, becoming the band's sixth overall chart-topper. In 2016, it was featured in Acura's Summer of Performance Event TV spot, "Weekends: RDX".

== Background ==
The song's foundation was laid by guitarist Brad Shultz, who was inspired by the aggressive riffs of Jay Reatard. Shultz was initially hesitant to include the song on Tell Me I'm Pretty, feeling it didn't fit the album's overall direction. However his brother Matt convinced his Shultz to pursue the song, drawn to the "rapid-fire delivery" and energy he had heard in OutKast's music.

== Music video ==
The official music video for "Mess Around" was released on October 29, 2015. The video consists of footage from films by French filmmaker Georges Méliès, including A Trip to the Moon and The Impossible Voyage.

== Reception ==
Consequence stated that the song "is both immediately satisfying and entirely familiar, a unity of experiment and expectation. Fuzzed-out guitars collide with an instantly singable hook." Billboard added that "It features a full, rich rock sound with electric guitars and a solid beat. Matt Shultz's vocals wrap around the distorted guitars for the familiar sound."

== Charts ==
=== Weekly charts ===
| Chart (2016) | Peak position |
|---|---|
| Canada Hot 100 (Billboard) | 93 |
| Canada Rock (Billboard) | 1 |
| US Hot Rock & Alternative Songs (Billboard) | 16 |
| US Rock & Alternative Airplay (Billboard) | 1 |

=== Year-end charts ===
| Chart (2016) | Position |
|---|---|
| US Hot Rock Songs (Billboard) | 43 |
| US Rock Airplay (Billboard) | 12 |

== Certifications ==
| Region | Certification | Certified units/sales |
|---|---|---|
| United States (RIAA) | Gold | 500,000^{‡} |
^{‡} Sales+streaming figures based on certification alone.

== Release history ==
| Region | Date | Format | Label |
|---|---|---|---|
| United States | November 3, 2015 | Modern rock radio | RCA Records |
