= Cigarette Daydreams =

Single by Cage the Elephant

from the album Melophobia
- Released: August 26, 2014
- Recorded: 2012–2013
- Studio: St. Charles, Nashville, Tennessee
- Genre: Alternative rock
- Length: 3:28
- Label: RCA
- Songwriters: Matthew Shultz, Lincoln Parish, Brad Shultz, Daniel Tichenor, Jared Champion
- Producer: Jay Joyce

Cage the Elephant singles chronology
"Take It or Leave It" (2014)	"Cigarette Daydreams" (2014)	"Mess Around" (2015)

Music video
- "Cigarette Daydream" on YouTube

"Cigarette Daydreams" is a song by American alternative rock band Cage the Elephant. Produced by Jay Joyce, it was released as the third single from the band's third studio album Melophobia (2013) on August 26, 2014. It topped the Billboard Alternative Songs chart in the United States, becoming the second number-one single from Melophobia, following the album's single "Come a Little Closer", and the band's fifth overall chart-topper.

In late 2024 it became the band's first song to reach 1 billion streams on Spotify.

== Writing and background ==
Singer Matt Shultz has stated that the song is inspired by a "personal experience" and that the words came to him naturally. After he began writing, Shultz phoned the album's producer who stated "Matt, finish the song right now! Just do it." Shultz also noted that the song came from a desire to "be transparent and speak from naked honesty".

The song's background is rooted in a softer, more melancholic, brooding sound distinct from the band's typical style, incorporating nostalgic black and white imagery in its music video, which depicts a fractured, hallucinatory love story.

== Music video ==
The official music video for "Cigarette Daydreams" was directed by Mark Pellington and released on September 5, 2014. The video stars actress Juliette Buchs – who later became the wife of Cage the Elephant frontman Matthew Shultz – as a woman struggling to find peace in her life, interspersed with various scenes of her running away from an unknown entity.

== Charts ==
=== Weekly charts ===
Chart (2015)	Peak position
Canada Rock (Billboard)	6
US Bubbling Under Hot 100 (Billboard)	2
US Adult Pop Airplay (Billboard)	40
US Hot Rock & Alternative Songs (Billboard)	9
US Rock & Alternative Airplay (Billboard)	2

=== Year-end charts ===
Chart (2015)	Position
US Hot Rock Songs (Billboard)	39
US Rock Airplay Songs (Billboard)	18

== Certifications ==
Region	Certification	Certified units/sales
Brazil (Pro-Música Brasil)	2× Platinum	120,000^{‡}
Denmark (IFPI Danmark)	Gold	45,000^{‡}
Italy (FIMI)	Gold	50,000^{‡}
United Kingdom (BPI)	Platinum	600,000^{‡}
United States (RIAA)	5× Platinum	5,000,000^{‡}
^{‡} Sales+streaming figures based on certification alone.

== Release history ==
Region	Date	Format	Label
United States	August 26, 2014	Modern rock radio	RCA Records
