= Tell Me I'm Pretty =

Studio album by Cage the Elephant
- Released: December 18, 2015
- Recorded: Spring 2015
- Studio: Easy Eye Sound (Nashville)
- Genres: Alternative rock; garage rock; blues rock
- Length: 38:11
- Label: RCA
- Producer: Dan Auerbach

Cage the Elephant chronology
Melophobia (2013)	Tell Me I'm Pretty (2015)	Unpeeled (2017)

Singles from Tell Me I'm Pretty
- 1. "Mess Around" Released: October 29, 2015; 2. "Trouble" Released: April 26, 2016; 3. "Cold Cold Cold" Released: January 17, 2017

Tell Me I'm Pretty is the fourth studio album by American rock band Cage the Elephant. It was released on December 18, 2015, and was announced online on October 5, 2015. The album was recorded in the spring of 2015 at Easy Eye Sound in Nashville, Tennessee. Vocalist Matt Shultz stated: "With this record, we wanted to be more transparent. We wanted to capture the sentiment of each song, and whatever emotional response it provoked, to be really honest to that."

On October 29, 2015, the band released the first single from the album, "Mess Around", accompanied by a music video which was created using footage from the 1902 film A Trip to the Moon and other films by Georges Méliès. Two other songs, "Trouble" and "Too Late to Say Goodbye", were made available for download before the album's release. The second single "Trouble" was sent to alternative radio on April 26, 2016. The album won the award for Best Rock Album at the 59th Grammy Awards.

== Recording ==
Cage the Elephant recruited Dan Auerbach of The Black Keys to produce Tell Me I'm Pretty, with Matt describing him as "reactive" and keeping the band second-guessing themselves, urging scratch vocals and emphasizing first takes.

The band said they "just wanted to experiment with sounds. While you start experimenting with sound and you get out there a little bit, away from the norm, I think people will see that as psychedelic." This album reached farther than their usual work. Most of the songs off the album feature a more vintage 1960s/1970s sound.

The band was praised for their song writing with lyrics being more mature, emotional, and character-driven, showing the band’s growth as songwriters and storytellers.

== Composition ==
The first single, "Mess Around", was initially criticized by some for sounding too similar to material by the Black Keys; however, after the song "Trouble" was released as a preview in November, vocalist Matt Shultz told Alternative Nation, "...the songs have so much diversity in them that I don’t feel like any song is representative of the entire album, kind of like each sound has its own personality." He also said that the band found inspiration in David Bowie for his eclectic and ever-changing style.

The woman pictured on the album cover is the model Rachel Sykes. In an interview, Shultz said "When I looked at her, she was immediately beautiful to the eye but also there was some sense that she'd lived some real life in a way that I could relate to. She was this girl who was very beautiful but she had this kind of 'touched' look to her.”

== Release and commercial performance ==
The lead single, “Mess Around,” made its live debut on October 29, 2015, and the band later revealed on social media that its sound drew influence from groups like Outkast and The Black Keys. The song topped the Billboard Alternative Songs chart and broke into the Canadian Hot 100. The songs music video was released two days later on the 31st. This was followed by the release of the second single, “Trouble” which also topped the Alternative Songs chart. "Trouble" music video was released on April 25, 2016, and follows a Wild West esthetic. Ahead of the album’s official launch, Cage the Elephant also shared “Too Late to Say Goodbye” as a preview track to build anticipation. Another music video for the song "Cold Cold Cold" was later released on January 12, 2017.

The full album was released on December 18, 2015. Following the album’s release Cage the Elephant toured in support of the album taking part in the AF 2016 tour and then going on a North American headlining tour in support of the album from May to the June of 2016 with Portugal. The Man and Twin Peaks serving as support.

The album peaked at number 26 on the Billboard 200 and number 3 on both Top Alternative Albums and Top Rock Albums. The record was certified gold by the Recording Industry Association of America (RIAA) on November 10, 2022.

== Critical reception ==
Professional ratings
Aggregate scores
Source	Rating
Metacritic	73/100
Review scores
Source	Rating
Exclaim!	8/10
The Guardian	4/5 stars
AllMusic	3.5/5 stars
Consequence of Sound	B−
The Observer	3/5 stars
The A.V. Club	B
Rolling Stone	3.5/5 stars
Drowned in Sound	8/10

Tell Me I'm Pretty received generally favorable reviews from music critics. According to review aggregator Metacritic, the album has an average critic review score of 73/100, based on 16 reviews. Writing for Exclaim!, Daniel Sylvester said that frontman Matthew Shultz "has hit the mark lyrically and vocally here, inviting listeners into the emotionally charged and honest world that Cage the Elephant inhabit." Dave Simpson writing for The Guardian gave it a 4/5 stating “ The producer’s trademarks – slightly psychedelic 60s garage rock given a postmodern sound – are all over Tell Me I’m Pretty, but the band never abandon their own singular, brattish energy. There are Stonesy and Kinksy riffs and classic themes about worried parents, ruckuses, self-doubt and at least one visit to the doctor “’cause I don’t feel right”. The band are operating in an ever more overcrowded field, but their songwriting has never been sharper.” Neil Young of AllMusic wrote with this album "Cage the Elephant are maturing and their songs have a new heft to them, which may drive away some old diehards but will certainly attract new followers."

Consequence of Sound added "The band’s musicality shines far greater than ever, even when blended together into a psychedelic soup: Brad Shultz has perfected his pedal work (“Too Late to Say Goodbye”, “Mess Around”), drummer Jared Champion has strengthened his grip on Starr quality (“Sweetie Little Jean”), and Daniel Tichenor is determined to make bass line love to each and every harmony on wax. Most importantly, Auerbach’s leadership acts like an epic spotlight, differentiating the fourth Cage album from everything else in their catalog."

Andrew Harrison writing for Drowned in sound stated “Tell Me I’m Pretty sits very much in the same league as Melophobia – a confident, eclectic rock record with heaps of personality and charm. It smacks of a band who, having finally found their identity, are starting to explore new territory with remarkable confidence.”

Tell Me I'm Pretty won Best Rock Album at the 59th Annual Grammy Awards on February 12, 2017, marking the band’s first Grammy win.

== Track listing ==
All tracks are written by Cage the Elephant.

No.	Title	Length
1.	"Cry Baby"	4:07
2.	"Mess Around"	2:53
3.	"Sweetie Little Jean"	3:44
4.	"Too Late to Say Goodbye"	4:12
5.	"Cold Cold Cold"	3:34
6.	"Trouble"	3:45
7.	"How Are You True"	4:40
8.	"That's Right"	3:52
9.	"Punchin' Bag"	3:47
10.	"Portuguese Knife Fight"	3:37
Total length:		38:11

== Personnel ==
Personnel adapted from album liner notes.

Cage the Elephant

- Matt Shultz − lead vocals; acoustic guitar (all but 4 and 10)
- Brad Shultz − rhythm guitar
- Daniel Tichenor − bass
- Jared Champion − drums

Additional musicians

- Dan Auerbach − additional guitar, backing vocals, keyboards
- Nick Bockrath − lead guitar, backing vocals
- Matthan Minster − keyboards, backing vocals, percussion; additional guitar (tracks 1 and 2)

Production

- Dan Auerbach − production, arrangements
- Ira Chernova − photography
- Emily Davis − hand tinting
- Collin Dupuis − engineering
- Tom Elmhirst − mixing
- Meghan Foley − art direction
- Brian Lucey – mastering
- Moses Moreno − styling
- Juliette Buchs Shultz − additional design, additional photography
- Matt Shultz − art direction
- Kane Stewart − senior design graphic artist
- Danny Tomczak – assistant production

== Charts ==
=== Weekly charts ===
Chart (2015–16)	Peak position
Australia (ARIA Hitseekers)	3
Canadian Albums (Billboard)	30
US Billboard 200	26
US Top Rock Albums (Billboard)	3
US Top Alternative Albums (Billboard)	3
UK Albums (Official Charts)	135

=== Year-end charts ===
Chart (2016)	Position
US Top Rock Albums (Billboard)	44

== Certifications ==
Region	Certification	Certified units/sales
United States (RIAA)	Gold	500,000^{‡}
^{‡} Sales+streaming figures based on certification alone.
