= Neon Pill (Cage the Elephant song) =

2024 single by Cage the Elephant

Single by Cage The Elephant

from the album Neon Pill
- Released: January 19, 2024
- Recorded: 2023
- Genre: Alternative rock
- Length: 3:21
- Label: RCA
- Songwriter: Cage The Elephant
- Producer: John Hill

Cage The Elephant singles chronology
"Skin and Bones" (2020)	"Neon Pill" (2024)	"Out Loud" (2024)

"Neon Pill" is a song by American alternative rock band Cage The Elephant. It is the title track of their 6th studio album, Neon Pill, and was released as the first single on January 19, 2024. A music video was later released on May 20, 2024. In the U.S., it peaked at number 25 on the Mainstream Rock chart and topped the Alternative Airplay chart. The track was nominated for Best Alternative Music Performance at the 67th Annual Grammy Awards.

== Background ==
The song touches upon lead singer Matt Shultz psychosis that led to his eventual arrest. In an interview with IHeartRadio Matt Shultz stated why the song was picked as the title track “I definitely went through a really difficult time where I was prescribed a medication and unknowingly went into psychosis — it can happen, it's a terrible thing if it does — but I'm a living miracle right now, so that's probably the biggest reason why we chose that as the title track.”

== Charts ==
Chart (2024)	Peak position
Canada Rock (Billboard)	2
US Hot Rock & Alternative Songs (Billboard)	31
US Rock & Alternative Airplay (Billboard)	3
US Alternative Airplay (Billboard)	1
US Mainstream Rock (Billboard)	25
