= Melophobia =

Studio album by Cage the Elephant
- Released: October 8, 2013
- Recorded: 2012–2013
- Studios: St. Charles, Nashville, Tennessee
- Genres: Alternative rock; garage rock; psychedelic rock; indie rock; blues rock; surf punk
- Length: 37:23
- Labels: RCA (US); Universal (Canada); Virgin EMI (UK)
- Producer: Jay Joyce

Cage the Elephant chronology
Thank You, Happy Birthday (2011)	Melophobia (2013)	Tell Me I'm Pretty (2015)

Singles from Melophobia
- 1. "Come a Little Closer" Released: August 13, 2013; 2. "Take It or Leave It" Released: March 24, 2014; 3. "Cigarette Daydreams" Released: August 26, 2014

Melophobia is the third studio album by American rock band Cage the Elephant. Recorded at St. Charles in Nashville, Tennessee and produced by Jay Joyce, the album was released on October 8, 2013, through RCA Records. It is the last album that features lead guitarist Lincoln Parish.

The album was nominated for Best Alternative Music Album at the 57th Annual Grammy Awards. It was certified platinum by the Recording Industry Association of America (RIAA) on November 10, 2022.

== Background ==
For Melophobia, Cage the Elephant attempted to distance themselves from comparisons to the sounds that influenced them, shutting themselves off from as much recorded music as possible. Melophobia means "fear of music;" the band did not view the term literally, but rather thought of the term as "a fear of creating music to project premeditated images of self, like catering to cool, or making music to project an image of being intellectual or artistic or poetic, rather than just trying to be an honest communicator."

Frontman Matthew Shultz viewed the record as a battle "to remain transparent and to remain honest." Isaac Brock (frontman of Modest Mouse) once told his friend Tiger Merritt (of Morning Teleportation) that "if you're not slightly embarrassed to sing the lyrics, you're probably not writing a good song," and encouraged him to refrain from attempting to write poetically but rather naturally. Shultz said this made sense to him. When writing new tracks, Shultz would often doodle an image alongside his lyrics for visual reference.

During the winter when writing Melophobia, the band was moving between their home state of Kentucky and Nashville. They also spent time in a cabin in Portland, Tennessee where they worked on the songs.

== Album cover ==
The album cover was designed by artist R. Clint Colburn. During the process of making the artwork, Colburn sculpted a series of surreal, slightly grotesque miniature characters (plasticine / modeled figures), photographed them and placed them on a bold monochrome striped background that is seen in the final result. The visual treatment (clay figures + stark stripes) was selected from a set of characters Colburn produced; the band and art director chose the final figure and photographic arrangement. Several "making of" / behind-the-scenes clips show Colburn molding and photographing the figures for the sleeve.

== Composition ==
"Come a Little Closer" was inspired by a morning on which Shultz woke up in a São Paulo hotel and opened his window to watch the sunrise over the favelas. Finding the makeshift housing comparable to an anthill, he soon found himself wondering what each soul inside each borough felt, whether it be heartache, love, loss or joy. Shultz viewed "Telescope" as the breakthrough song in writing honestly; he based it on his loneliness. During a bout of seasonal depression, he spent time in his new home for the first time after nonstop touring and found himself "doing life's meaningless tasks to fill the void to pass the time", including obsessively decorating and feeling obligated to spend time in each room.

"Black Widow" features the usage of brass horns which Brad had been anxious to use for a while; however, Matt was against the inclusion of such instrumentation, which eventually led to a "big argument".

Many riffs started raw; Brad and Matt would keep them if the feeling was there rather than polishing them to perfection. Many songs were are built around tension between quiet and loud, space and saturation. They emphasized letting songs breathe. They used horns, odd chord voicings, off-beat rhythms, and unusual tunings to add color and avoid songs sounding too similar.

Melophobia saw the band move beyond their usual garage rock and funky blues rock sound. They incorporated numerous sounds and instruments, which resulted in a more dark and mellow sound along with elements of psychedelic rock while still keeping some of the blues style seen in their first two albums. With a strong vocal performance by Shultz, it all came together to completely reinvent the band's sound.

== Release and promotion ==
The album's lead single "Come a Little Closer" was teased via their YouTube channel on August 1, 2013, and premiered in full on August 8, 2013. It was released on iTunes for purchase on August 13. The song topped the Billboard Alternative Songs chart, peaked at number 7 on the Mainstream Rock chart and broke into the Canadian Hot 100 at number 72. The song's official music video was released on November 13 of that year.

“Take it or Leave It" was then released, and appeared at number 7 on the Billboard Alternative Songs chart. A music video for the song was later released on April 30. 2014. "Cigarette Daydreams" was the final single and was released on August 26, 2013. It also topped the Alternative Songs chart. Its music video was released on September 4, 2014, featuring lead singer Matt Shultz's ex-wife.

On September 20, 2013, Cage the Elephant performed multiple songs from the album on the Los Angeles radio station 106.7 KROQ.

The full album was officially released on October 8, 2013.

=== Commercial performance ===
The album debuted at No. 15 on the Billboard 200 albums chart on its first week of release, with around 18,000 copies sold in the United States. It also debuted at No. 6 on both the Top Rock Albums and the Alternative Albums charts. Internationally the album peaked at number 4 in the US. The album was officially certified platinum by the Recording Industry Association of America (RIAA) on November 10, 2022, for selling over 1,000,000 copies in the United States. The album also received platinum certification in New Zealand and gold certification in Brazil.

=== Touring ===
Following the release of the album, in January 2014 Cage the Elephant announced an extensive tour in support of the album. The tour started on February 3, 2014, in London and ended on May 20 in Oakland, California. The tour saw them make stops in Europe in the UK, France, Belgium, Ireland and Denmark. The second leg of the tour took place in South America with shows in Argentina, Chile and Brazil. The final leg of the tour strictly took place in the United States. They made multiple festival appearances at the Coachella Music Festival, Lollapalooza Brazil, Chile and Argentina.

== Critical reception ==
Professional ratings
Aggregate scores
Source	Rating
Metacritic	73/100
Review scores
Source	Rating
AllMusic	4/5 stars
Alternative Press	3.5/5 stars
Consequence of Sound	C+
Los Angeles Times	3/4 stars
Paste	8.0/10
Rolling Stone	3.5/5 stars
USA Today	3.5/4 stars
The Music	4/5 stars
Ox-Fanzine	4.5/5 stars
Ultimate Guitar	7.7/10

Melophobia has received positive reviews from contemporary music critics. Brian Mansfield of USA Today designated it "Album of the Week," summarizing that "Melophobia may mean 'fear of music,' but there's nothing to be afraid of: Its glorious chaos makes for thrilling listening." August Brown of the Los Angeles Times viewed Melophobia as "a bit more stoned and mellow" than its predecessor, "they're in a class of their own [...] Let's just be glad to have such imagination on our drive time rock radio again."

Holly Gleason of Paste described the album as "post-modern glam revival," praising Jay Joyce's production and opining that "Melophobia is united in both the urgency of the performances and the seemingly toxic love affairs that populate these songs." Rolling Stone's Jon Dolan considered the record a combination of "Sixties garage rock, Seventies punk and Eighties alt-rock into excellently weird new shapes." Doug McCausland of Alternative Nation said Melophobia was Cage's strongest record at the time.

Ox-Fanzine praised the album's change in sound compared to their previous releases, stating, "Melophobia is by no means boring. It is the magnificent evolution of a band that has realized how to move forward." A reviewer from Ultimate Guitar added, "The band has some kind of knack at creating a certain mood with their music that I can't quite define, but makes me feel more carefree than before I listened to the album."

Alternative Press's Jason Schreurs wrote that Melophobia "is, at its best, ambitious and teeming with ideas and, at worst, one heck of a mish-mash of sounds."

The album was the band's first to be nominated for a Grammy in Best Alternative Music Album category at the 57th Annual Grammy Awards.

== Track listing ==
All tracks are written by Cage the Elephant.

No.	Title	Length
1.	"Spiderhead"	3:42
2.	"Come a Little Closer"	3:49
3.	"Telescope"	3:48
4.	"It's Just Forever" (featuring Alison Mosshart)	3:30
5.	"Take It or Leave It"	3:27
6.	"Halo"	2:57
7.	"Black Widow"	3:07
8.	"Hypocrite"	4:08
9.	"Teeth"	5:27
10.	"Cigarette Daydreams"	3:28
Total length:		37:23

=== B-sides ===
No.	Title	Length
1.	"Baby Blue"	3:41
2.	"Jesse James"	2:53

== Personnel ==
Cage the Elephant

- Matthew Shultz – lead vocals
- Lincoln Parish – lead guitar, keyboards
- Brad Shultz – rhythm guitar, keyboards
- Daniel Tichenor – bass, backing vocals
- Jared Champion – drums

Additional musicians

- Jeff Coffin – saxophone on "Black Widow", "Hypocrite" and "Teeth"
- Roy Agee – trombone on "Black Widow", "Hypocrite" and "Teeth"
- Mike Haynes – trumpet on "Black Widow", "Hypocrite" and "Teeth"
- Alison Mosshart – vocals on "It's Just Forever"

Production

- Jay Joyce – production
- Tom Elmhirst – mixing engineer
- Ben Baptie – assistant mixing engineer
- Jason Hall – engineer
- Matt Wheeler – assistant engineer
- Tom Coyne – mastering

Artwork

- R. Clint Colburn – cover art

== Charts ==
Chart (2013)	Peak position
Australia (ARIA Hitseekers)	4
Canadian Albums (Billboard)	21
US Billboard 200	15
US Top Alternative Albums (Billboard)	6
US Top Hard Rock Albums (Billboard)	3
US Top Rock Albums (Billboard)	6
US Indie Store Album Sales (Billboard)	5
UK Albums (Official Charts)	117

== Certifications ==
Region	Certification	Certified units/sales
Brazil (Pro-Música Brasil)	Gold	20,000^{‡}
New Zealand (RMNZ)	Platinum	15,000^{‡}
United States (RIAA)	Platinum	1,000,000^{‡}
^{‡} Sales+streaming figures based on certification alone.
