= Cold Cold Cold =

Single by Cage the Elephant

from the album Tell Me I'm Pretty
- Released: January 17, 2017
- Recorded: Spring 2015
- Studio: Easy Eye Sound (Nashville, Tennessee)
- Length: 3:34
- Label: RCA
- Songwriters: Cage the Elephant; Dan Auerbach
- Producer: Dan Auerbach

Cage the Elephant singles chronology
"Trouble" (2016)	"Cold Cold Cold" (2017)	"Ready to Let Go" (2019)

"Cold Cold Cold" is a song by American alternative rock band Cage the Elephant. It was produced and co-written by Dan Auerbach of the Black Keys and was released as the third single from the band's fourth studio album Tell Me I'm Pretty (2015) on January 17, 2017. It reached number five on Billboard Alternative Songs chart in the United States.

== Music video ==
The songs music video was the first to be directed by lead singer Matt Shultz. The video tells the story of a man going into a mental institution, while the band plays in the background with a black and white filter over theme.

== Use in other media ==
"Cold Cold Cold" was used on the premiere episode of the fourth season of ABC television series How to Get Away with Murder.

== Charts ==
The song was a hit on the Billboard Alternative Songs chart, peaking at number five and staying on the chart for a total of 21 weeks. It was also a hit on the Adult Alternative Songs chart, peaking at four and charting for 28 weeks. The song also charted on several other charts, mainly charting in North America.

=== Weekly charts ===
Chart (2017)	Peak position
Canada Rock (Billboard)	4
Czech Republic Modern Rock (IFPI)	15
Mexico Ingles Airplay (Billboard)	49
US Hot Rock & Alternative Songs (Billboard)	22
US Rock & Alternative Airplay (Billboard)	6

=== Year-end charts ===
Chart (2017)	Position
US Hot Rock Songs (Billboard)	65
US Rock Airplay Songs (Billboard)	35

== Certifications ==
Region	Certification	Certified units/sales
Mexico (AMPROFON)	Gold	30,000^{‡}
New Zealand (RMNZ)	Gold	15,000^{‡}
United States (RIAA)	Platinum	1,000,000^{‡}
^{‡} Sales+streaming figures based on certification alone.

== Release history ==
Region	Date	Format	Label
United States	January 17, 2017	Modern rock radio	RCA Records
