= Trouble (Cage the Elephant song) =

Single by Cage the Elephant

from the album Tell Me I'm Pretty
- Released: April 26, 2016
- Recorded: Spring 2015
- Studio: Easy Eye Sound (Nashville, Tennessee)
- Genre: Dream-folk; psychedelic pop
- Length: 3:45
- Label: RCA
- Songwriters: Cage the Elephant; Dan Auerbach
- Producer: Dan Auerbach

Cage the Elephant singles chronology
| "Mess Around" (2015) | "Trouble" (2016) | "Cold Cold Cold" (2017) |

Music video
- "Trouble" on YouTube

"Trouble" is a song by American alternative rock band Cage the Elephant, released as the second single from the band's fourth studio album Tell Me I'm Pretty (2015) on April 26, 2016. Produced and co-written by Dan Auerbach of the Black Keys, it topped the Billboard Alternative Songs chart in the United States, becoming the band's seventh overall chart-topper.

== Background ==
Lead singer Matt Shultz said the song is "about honesty and adversity and struggle".

Shultz explained to ABC Radio that the song was inspired by a conversation he had with someone close to him. "We were both presenting ourselves as being very honest in the conversation. And I felt there were several places where I was holding back, or kind of curating the idea of what I wanted projected pretty heavily as inside the conversation. So I was curious at what level they were doing the same."

== Music video ==
The official music video for "Trouble" was released on April 21, 2016. The video combines the story of a western-style duel and its delusional results with shots of the band performing in the desert. Schultz wanted to suggest the likes of John Wayne and Clint Eastwood, and present "A metaphorical journey that hopefully people could read between the lines." It was filmed at the Joshua Tree National Park and it also marks Shultz' directorial debut.

== Charts ==
The song was a hit on the Billboard Alternative Songs chart, peaking at number one and staying on the chart for a total of 51 weeks. It was also a hit on the Adult Alternative Songs chart, peaking at four and charting for 28 weeks. The song also charted on several other charts, mainly charting in North America.

=== Weekly charts ===
| Chart (2016) | Peak position |
|---|---|
| Canada Rock (Billboard) | 9 |
| US Hot Rock & Alternative Songs (Billboard) | 12 |
| US Rock & Alternative Airplay (Billboard) | 2 |

=== Year-end charts ===
| Chart (2016) | Position |
|---|---|
| US Hot Rock Songs (Billboard) | 33 |
| US Rock Airplay Songs (Billboard) | 11 |
| Chart (2017) | Position |
| US Rock Airplay Songs (Billboard) | 8 |

== Certifications ==
| Region | Certification | Certified units/sales |
|---|---|---|
| United Kingdom (BPI) | Silver | 200,000^{‡} |
| United States (RIAA) | 2× Platinum | 2,000,000^{‡} |
^{‡} Sales+streaming figures based on certification alone.

== Release history ==
| Region | Date | Format | Label |
|---|---|---|---|
| United States | April 26, 2016 | Modern rock radio | RCA Records |

== Reception ==
Rolling Stone praised "Trouble" as the standout song of the album, saying it "sounds gorgeously burnt, with a vaguely hounded feel that evokes red eyes hidden behind mirror-shades." DrownedInSound called it "a wickedly left-field dirge that sees Shultz hush up his usually manic delivery" and The A.V. Club called it "uncharacteristically restrained". The Guardian noted the obvious influence of 1990s era Frank Black.

== In media ==
- The song plays during the final scene of the first season of The Lincoln Lawyer.
- It plays at the end of season one, episode eleven of Bull and season one, episode two of Santa Clarita Diet.
- In May 2023, the song was featured in an Amazon commercial where two brothers are bickering and their mother orders them space-themed tents for their beds to get them to stop their bickering.
- In 2024, the song was featured in the trailer for The Strangers: Chapter 1.
