= Come a Little Closer (Cage the Elephant song) =

Single by Cage the Elephant

from the album Melophobia
- B-side: "Baby Blue"
- Released: August 13, 2013
- Recorded: 2012–2013
- Studio: St. Charles, Nashville, Tennessee
- Genre: Alternative rock; indie rock; psychedelic rock
- Length: 3:49
- Label: RCA
- Songwriters: Jared Champion, Lincoln Parish, Brad Shultz, Matt Shultz, Daniel Tichenor
- Producer: Jay Joyce

Cage the Elephant singles chronology
"Aberdeen" (2011)	"Come a Little Closer" (2013)	"Take It or Leave It" (2014)

Music video
- "Come a Little Closer" on YouTube

"Come a Little Closer" is a song by American rock band Cage the Elephant. Written by lead singer Matthew Shultz and produced by Jay Joyce, it was released as the lead single from the band's third studio album Melophobia on August 13, 2013. It topped the Billboard Alternative Songs chart in the United States, giving the band their fourth number-one hit on the chart.

== Background ==
Cage the Elephant lead singer Matthew Shultz wrote "Come a Little Closer", taking inspiration from an occasion in which he woke up in a São Paulo hotel in the early morning and opened his window to watch the sunrise over the favelas. Finding the makeshift housing comparable to an anthill, he soon found himself wondering what each soul inside each borough felt, whether it be heartache, love, loss or joy.

== Music video ==
The music video for "Come a Little Closer" was directed by Matthew Schultz and released on November 12, 2013. A mix of animation and live-action footage, it depicts the members of Cage the Elephant being transported to an alien planet and trying to escape from several monstrous beings, and in Schultz's case, having to navigate out of the stomach of a giant whale and evade being devoured by a group of birds. Schultz then rides a flaming lion and makes his way to a different planet made of skulls, traveling into its core and managing to escape death by destroying it. Scenes of the band performing the song is interspersed throughout.

== Reception ==
Philip Lickley of All-Noise Uk wrote that the song "gets its rewards for its intriguing production, complimentary instrument lines and a determination to build up to something through its singable chorus and indie stylings." Chad Childers of Nosiecreep noted that "The track comes off as a more haunting and melodic Cage the Elephant than we're used to, with a mid-tempo opening feature Matt Shultz's affected vocals." As for the vocals Rolling Stone stated "frontman Matt Shultz scales back his usually gritty vocals for a spacey, psychedelic croon."

== Track listing ==
- Digital download
1. "Come a Little Closer" – 3:49
- 7" vinyl
1. "Come a Little Closer" – 3:49
2. "Baby Blue" – 3:57

== Charts ==
=== Weekly charts ===
Weekly chart performance for "Come a Little Closer"
Chart (2013–2014)	Peak position
Canada Hot 100 (Billboard)	72
Canada Rock (Billboard)	2
CIS Airplay (TopHit)	195
Mexico Ingles Airplay (Billboard)	41
US Bubbling Under Hot 100 (Billboard)	7
US Adult Pop Airplay (Billboard)	24
US Hot Rock & Alternative Songs (Billboard)	15
US Rock & Alternative Airplay (Billboard)	1

=== Year-end charts ===
2013 year-end chart performance for "Come a Little Closer"
Chart (2013)	Position
US Hot Rock Songs (Billboard)	46
US Rock Airplay (Billboard)	23

2014 year-end chart performance for "Come a Little Closer"
Chart (2014)	Position
US Hot Rock Songs (Billboard)	35
US Rock Airplay (Billboard)	3

== Certifications ==
Certifications for "Come a Little Closer"
Region	Certification	Certified units/sales
Brazil (Pro-Música Brasil)	Platinum	60,000^{‡}
United Kingdom (BPI)	Silver	200,000^{‡}
United States (RIAA)	3× Platinum	3,000,000^{‡}
^{‡} Sales+streaming figures based on certification alone.

== Release history ==
Release dates and formats for "Come a Little Closer"
Region	Date	Format	Label
United States	August 13, 2013	Digital download	RCA Records
United States	August 13, 2013	Active rock radio	RCA Records
United States	August 13, 2013	Modern rock radio	RCA Records
United Kingdom	February 3, 2014	7" vinyl	Virgin EMI Records
