= Cage the Elephant =

American rock band from Kentucky

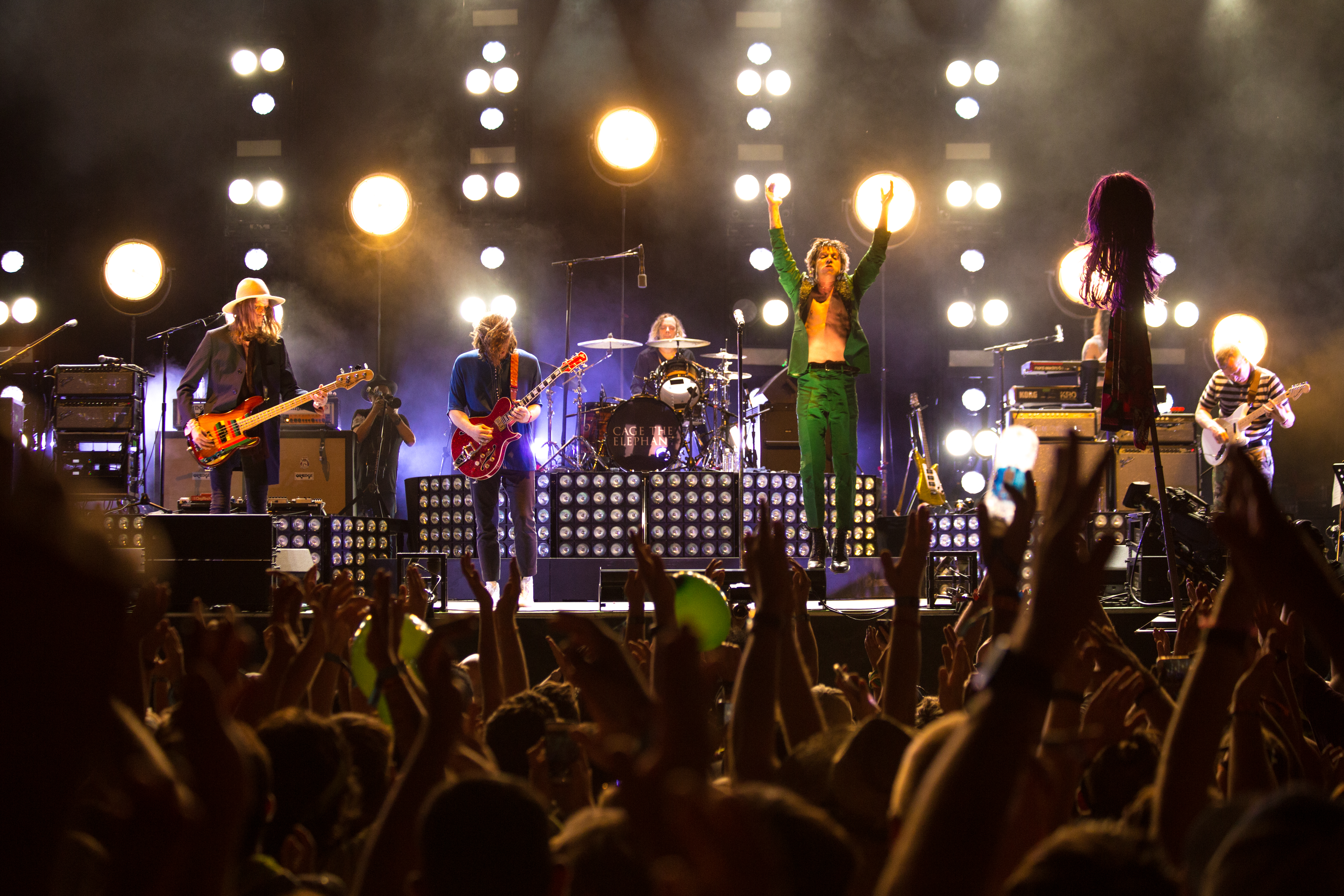
- Cage the Elephant performing at the 2017 Bonnaroo Music & Arts Festival

Background information
- Origin: Bowling Green, Kentucky, U.S.
- Genres: Alternative rock; indie rock; psychedelic rock; garage rock; punk blues; post-punk
- Years active: 2006–present
- Labels: Relentless Records; RED Ink Records; Jive Records; RCA Records
- Members: Matt Shultz; Brad Shultz; Nick Bockrath; Matthan Minster; Daniel Tichenor; Jared Champion
- Past members: Lincoln Parish
- Website: cagetheelephant.con

Cage the Elephant is an American rock band formed in 2006 in Bowling Green, Kentucky. They moved to England and settled in London in 2008, shortly before their self-titled first album was released. As of 2017, the band's personnel were Matt Shultz (vocals), his older brother Brad Shultz (rhythm guitar), Nick Bockrath (lead guitar), Matthan Minster (guitar, keyboards), Daniel Tichenor (bass), and Jared Champion (drums). The band's self-titled debut album was released in 2008 and included several radio singles in the United States and the United Kingdom. It was influenced by classic rock, '90s alternative, blues, punk rock, and funk music. Lincoln Parish served as the band's lead guitarist from 2006 until 2013, when he left to pursue a career in production.

The band's second album, Thank You, Happy Birthday, was released in 2011 and was heavily influenced by punk rock as well as bands such as Pixies and Nirvana. The band's third album, Melophobia, was released in 2013. The band's fourth album, Tell Me I'm Pretty, was produced by Dan Auerbach and released in 2015. The band released a live album, Unpeeled, in 2017. Their fifth studio album, Social Cues, was released in 2019, and their sixth, Neon Pill, was released on May 17, 2024.

They have achieved 14 number one hits on the Billboard Alternative Airplay chart and won the Grammy Award for Best Rock Album twice, in 2017 for Tell Me I'm Pretty and in 2020 for Social Cues.

== History ==
=== Previous careers ===
Prior to joining Cage the Elephant, Matt Shultz worked in construction as a plumber. In an interview with the "Rock It Out!" blog for Consequence of Sound, he said he felt like if he did not quit that job, he would be stuck there for the rest of his life. He left to work at a sandwich bar with his brother, Brad Shultz, who had previously worked in telemarketing. Daniel Tichenor held a job at Lowe's and Jared Champion worked in a pet store.

Nick Bockrath is part of the band Nicos Gun and previously played bass with Morning Teleportation. Cage got to know him through their friendship with that band. Matthan Minster formed a band called YOURS in 2010.

=== Formation and name ===
Members of Cage the Elephant had previously been involved in the band Perfect Confusion when they were in high school and released a self-titled LP in 2005. Matt Shultz was also in an experimental punk band in middle school called Left Nostril.

The band's name, according to lead singer Matt Shultz, came from an incident in 2006 when a mentally disabled man approached the band after a show. He hugged Shultz and kept repeating the sentence "You have to cage the elephant" over and over again. This explanation has been the subject of debate, as Schultz has given contradictory explanations in various interviews. Despite this, the encounter with the mentally disabled man remains the most widely cited and consistently reported account by media outlets.

=== Early years and Cage the Elephant (2007–2010) ===
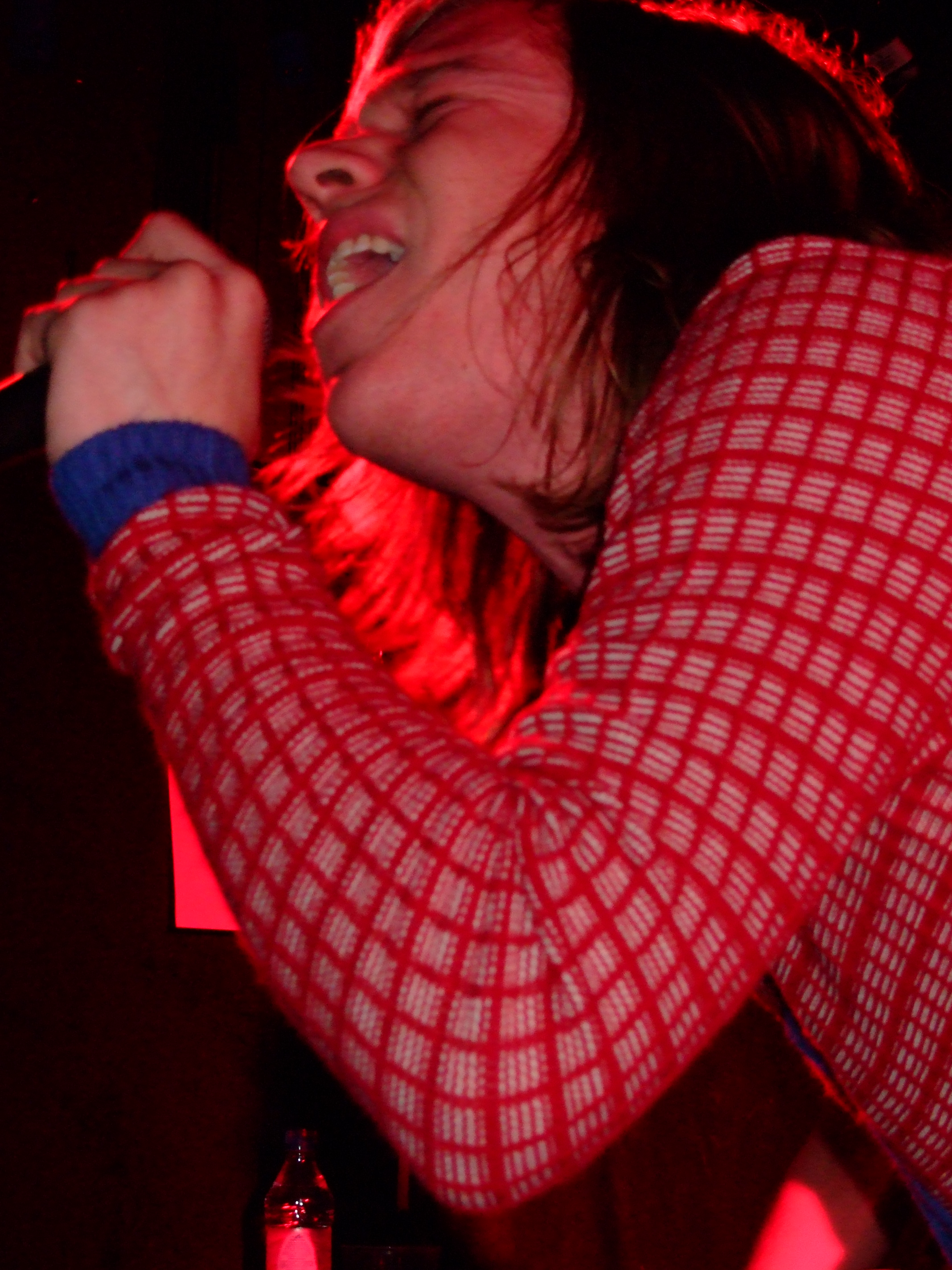
Matt Shultz performing at the Barfly in London, England in 2008

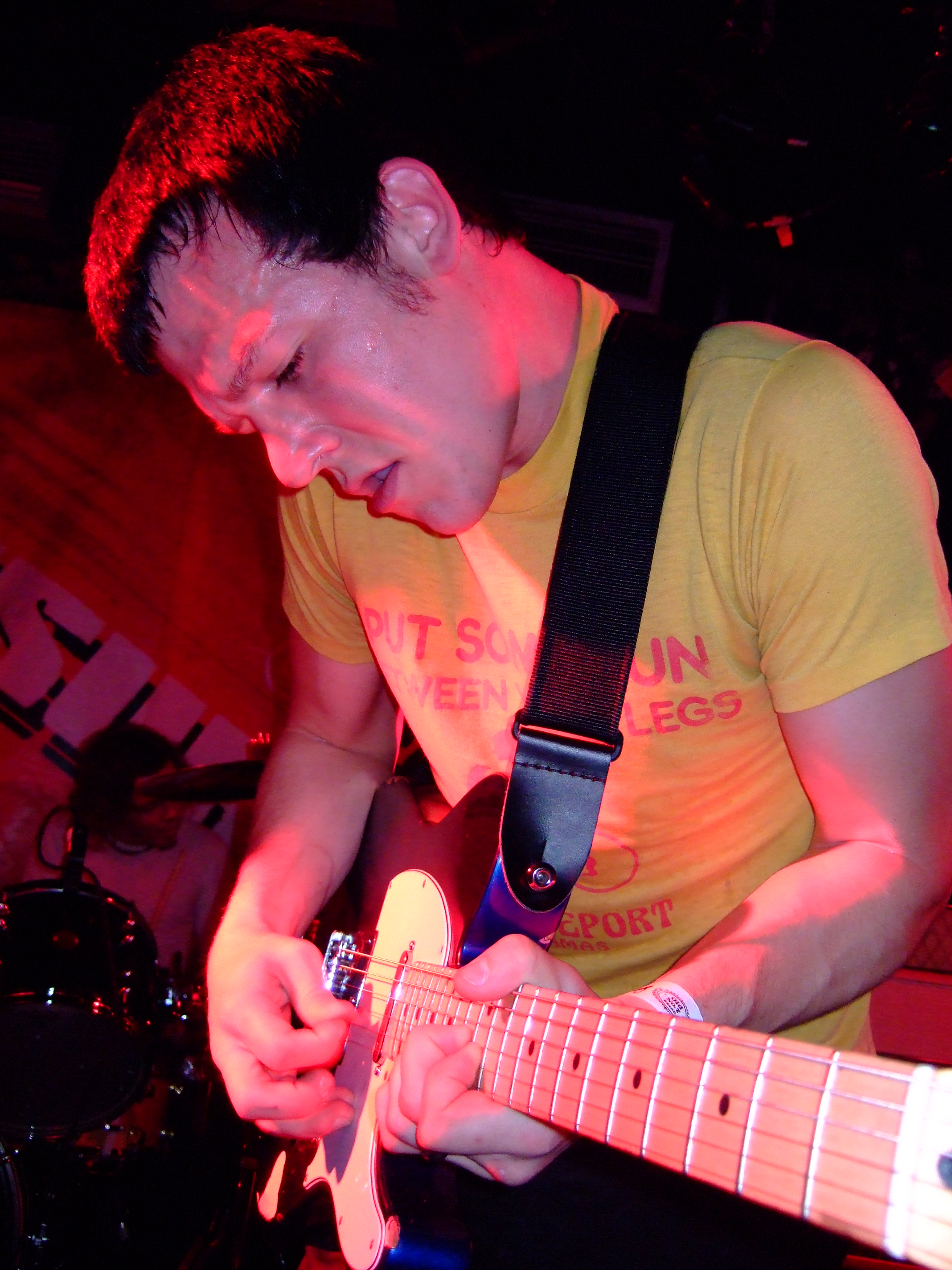
Brad Shultz at the Barfly in 2008

The band signed with Relentless Records after showcasing at the 2007 South by Southwest music festival. Their first tour was as a support act for Queens of the Stone Age in Canada. They then moved to London, England, to the Leyton area on the outskirts of the city. At the time, Lincoln Parish was only 16 years old, so in order to be able to move, his parents had to sign over parental guardianship to the band. In 2008, they appeared on the British show Later... with Jools Holland with Coldplay, Sia, Glen Campbell, John Mellencamp, and Amy LaVere. They released their eponymous debut album, Cage the Elephant, on June 23, 2008, in the United Kingdom and April 21, 2009, in the United States, Japan, Australia, and Canada, to mostly favorable reviews. Their single "Ain't No Rest for the Wicked" reached number 32 on the UK Singles Chart and number 83 on the Billboard Hot 100. The song was featured in the Gearbox Software video game Borderlands, as well as in the 2010 movie The Bounty Hunter. It was also featured as iTunes' free single of the week for the week of April 12, 2009. In 2009 the song "Back Against the Wall" became the band's first track to chart at the number 1 position on the alternative charts. The album has since been certified platinum by the RIAA.

Cage the Elephant appeared as a support act on tour with The Pigeon Detectives in early 2008, and for Silversun Pickups and Manchester Orchestra in 2009. They appeared on Everybody Loves Lil' Chris in October 2008. The group made a national TV appearance on the Late Show with David Letterman, performing "Ain't No Rest for the Wicked" in July 2009. In August 2009, Cage the Elephant played for the first time at Lollapalooza in Chicago, as well as San Francisco's Outside Lands Music and Arts Festival on August 30, 2009. Prior to their return to Lollapalooza, the band also performed twice at Bonnaroo, once in June 2007 and in 2009. They released the single "Back Against the Wall" which was later included in a Wii game, called We Cheer, We Cheer 2. The band continued to tour heavily in 2010 hitting the festival circuit along with headlining dates.

=== Thank You, Happy Birthday (2011–2012) ===
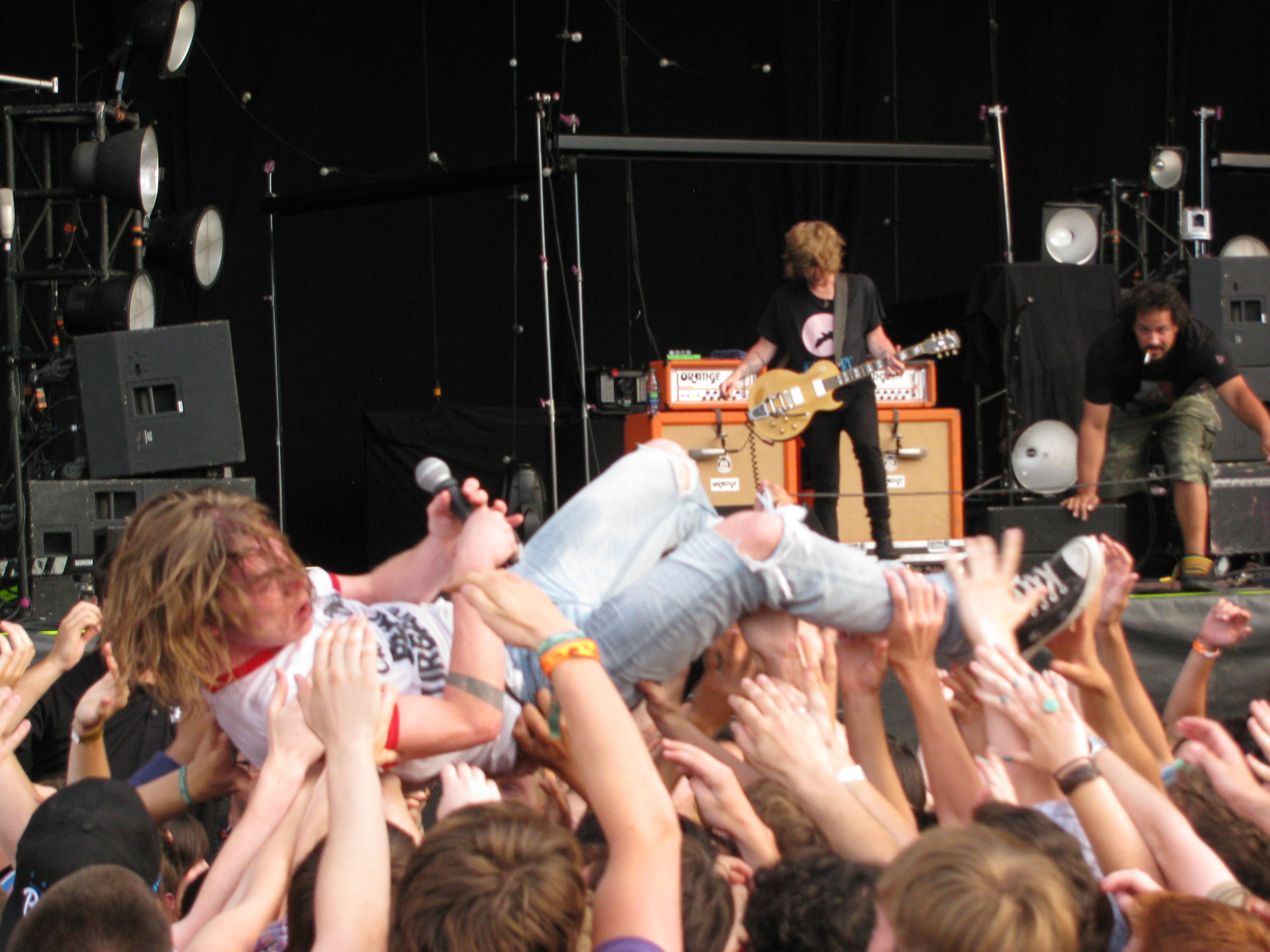
Matt Shultz crowd surfing at Bluesfest in 2011

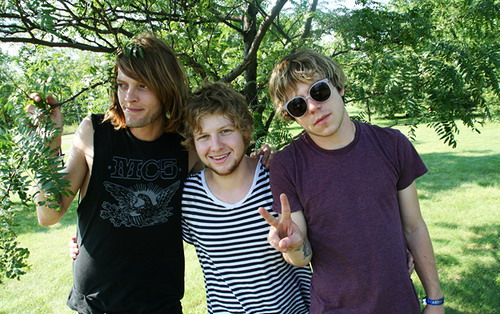
Daniel Tichenor, Lincoln Parish and Matt Shultz in 2010

The band announced their sophomore album in July 2009 (when the band had stated that they would release it in early 2010), with the title Computer Says Move. However, after recording over 80 songs, they decided to scrap all of them due to none of them being into any of the ideas. They then took ideas that they had saved for "side projects" and decided to use those songs for the album, and came up with the new title Thank You Happy Birthday. The group was able to work out twelve songs for the album, stating: "We want each of our songs to sound like it's been written by a different band."

Thank You, Happy Birthday, was officially released in January 2011. The album sold 39,000 copies during its first week in the U.S., debuting at Number 2 on the Billboard 200, losing to the band Cake's Showroom of Compassion. The album received positive reception from most critics, with Alternative Press calling it "an alarmingly good album". The song "Shake Me Down" dominated the alternative charts stating at the number one position for 6 weeks while also reaching number 78 on the Billboard Hot 100. It was also the band's first song to top the Canada Rock Billboard and as of 2025 the band's only song to reach number 1 on the Hot Rock and Alternative songs chart. The album has since been certified gold.

Throughout the year, Cage the Elephant supported the album by playing live. The group landed multiple late night shows, such as the Late Show with David Letterman and The Tonight Show with Jay Leno. Cage the Elephant also landed the bill for music festivals such as Coachella and the Glastonbury Festival. On August 6, 2011, Cage the Elephant performed at the Kansas Speedway for the first annual Kanrocksas music festival. In the later half of the year, the band supported the Foo Fighters, who were on tour supporting their new album Wasting Light. In October, drummer Jared Champion's appendix suddenly burst, requiring immediate medical attention. Dave Grohl, the Foo Fighters' frontman and former drummer of Nirvana, temporarily filled in for Champion while he was recuperating.

The band's hit song "Shake Me Down" was nominated for a MTV Video Music Award for Best Rock Video in September 2011.

The group's audience expanded widely throughout 2011. Although they were formed in the 2000s, the band earned the top spot in Rolling Stone's "Reader's Poll: The Best New Artist of 2011". The band Sleeper Agent, another Bowling Green music group and close friends with Cage the Elephant, came in second place. The magazine also named Thank You, Happy Birthday as the 15th best album of the year. That year, Cage the Elephant and Manchester Orchestra embarked on a co-headlining tour with Sleeper Agent as the opening band.

In January 2012, the band released their first live album Live from The Vic in Chicago, recorded during their 2011 tour, and also played at the Big Day Out music festival.

=== Melophobia (2013–2015) ===
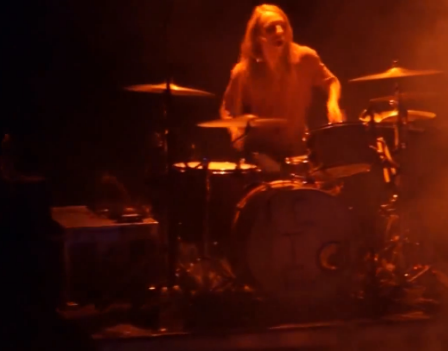
Former touring musician Kyle Davis in Columbus, Ohio in December 2014

Cage the Elephant regrouped in the studio to record their third album Melophobia (meaning "fear of music"). The album's lead single "Come a Little Closer" was teased via their YouTube channel on August 1, 2013, and premiered in full on August 8, 2013. It was released on iTunes for purchase on August 13. In an interview with iHeartRadio during Lollapalooza 2013, Matt Shultz revealed the title of the upcoming album. Melophobia was released on October 8, 2013, The album debuted at No. 15 on the Billboard 200 albums chart on its first week of release to largely positive reviews. Brian Mansfield of USA Today designated it "Album of the Week," summarizing that "Melophobia may mean 'fear of music,' but there's nothing to be afraid of: Its glorious chaos makes for thrilling listening. However Shultz mentioned in an interview with Billboard that Melophobia is not a fear of music, rather, "It's a fear of creating music under false pretenses, catering to cool, or writing to project some sort of image that's based upon social standards...[It's] trying to sound artistic, poetic or intellectual, rather than just trying to communicate an honest thought or feeling or story." "Take It or Leave It" and "Cigarette Daydreams" were released on March 24, 2014, and August 26, 2014, respectively. "Come a Little Closer" and "Cigarette Daydreams" both went on to claim the number 1 position on the alternative airplay. The band toured with Muse as an opening act in the fall of 2013. On August 24, 2013, the band performed Melophobia in its entirety live at Soundcheck Nashville in front of an intimate audience of friends and family. The band also performed the songs "Spiderhead" and "Come A Little Closer" live on Los Angeles radio station KROQ.

Lead guitarist Lincoln Parish left the band early in December 2013 to focus on his production company, TalkBoxRodeo. In an interview, Parish said that he "wanted to be a producer before anything else. And then [Cage the Elephant] obviously took off and did more than what any of us could have expected." Guitarist Nick Bockrath filled in as lead guitarist on Jimmy Kimmel Live! on December 9 and on subsequent shows. The Melophobia tour continued into 2014, including a stop at the Lollapalooza music festival on August 3. The band also toured with The Black Keys on their Turn Blue tour, and then with Foals on their 2014 UK and US tours.

In August 2013, Brad Shultz and his wife Lindsay had a child named Etta Grace, and on November 12, 2014, Jared Champion and his partner Alicia had a child named Rosalyn. Kyle Davis filled in for Champion during the December 2014 tour, while he spent time with his family.

On February 8, 2015, Cage the Elephant earned their first Grammy nomination for Best Alternative Music Album category at the 57th Annual Grammy Awards. The album has since been certified platinum.

=== Tell Me I'm Pretty (2015–2017) ===
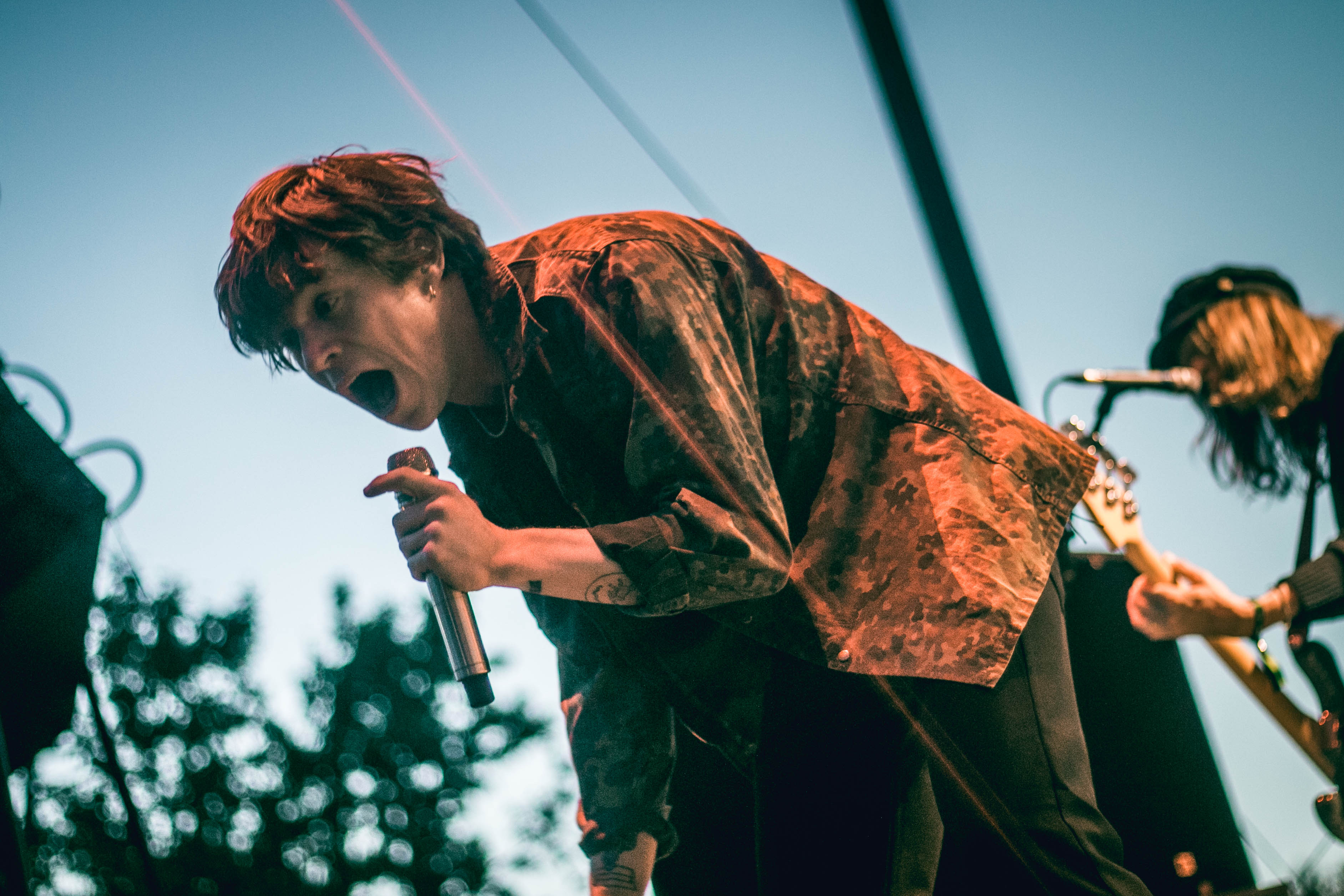
Cage the Elephant performing in 2017

Cage the Elephant released their fourth album, Tell Me I'm Pretty, on December 18, 2015, with Dan Auerbach, a member of The Black Keys, as the producer. The band said they "just wanted to experiment with sounds. While you start experimenting with sound and you get out there a little bit, away from the norm, I think people will see that as psychedelic." This project reached farther than their usual work, with most of the songs off the album featuring a more vintage 1960s sound. The album's first single, "Mess Around", was first performed by the band on October 29, 2015. The band posted on Twitter stating that the song was inspired by the band Outkast and The Black Keys. The band then released their second single from the album, "Trouble". To promote the album, "Too Late To Say Goodbye" was put out to the public before the band released the full album. Trouble and Mess Around would both peak at number 1 position on the alternative airplay charts.

The woman pictured on the cover of the album is model Rachel Sykes. In an interview, lead singer Matt Shultz said "When I looked at her, she was immediately beautiful to the eye but also there was some sense that she'd lived some real life in a way that I could relate to..." He then continued to say that she looked as if she had been "touched" and he was delighted to see how she acted in real life, when she was not being photographed or on camera. The album debuted at number 26 on the Billboard 200 and received positive reception from critics and fans alike. Andrew Harrison writing for Drowned in Sound stated "Tell Me I'm Pretty sits very much in the same league as Melophobia – a confident, eclectic rock record with heaps of personality and charm. It smacks of a band who, having finally found their identity, are starting to explore new territory with remarkable confidence."

In January 2016 the band appeared on The Tonight Show Starring Jimmy Fallon and performed "Mess Around". On February 7, 2016, the band opened for Metallica at a Super Bowl eve concert at AT&T Park. They then joined Foals and Silversun Pickups on the "Spring Rock AF 2016" Tour. They then went on their own summer headlining tour in support of Tell Me I'm Pretty with Portugal. The Man providing support.

Tell Me I'm Pretty won Best Rock Album at the 59th Annual Grammy Awards on February 12, 2017, marking the band's first Grammy win. The album has also been certified gold by the RIAA.

On July 28, 2017, the band released a live album titled Unpeeled. It was recorded while band was on tour during their "live and unpeeled" shows in Los Angeles, Washington DC, Nashville and Knoxville. The album included 18 curated songs from past albums and 3 cover songs. The band described the acoustic covers accompanied with a string section as "refreshing" and a "change in pace". It received high reviews from music critics.

=== Social Cues (2018–2023) ===
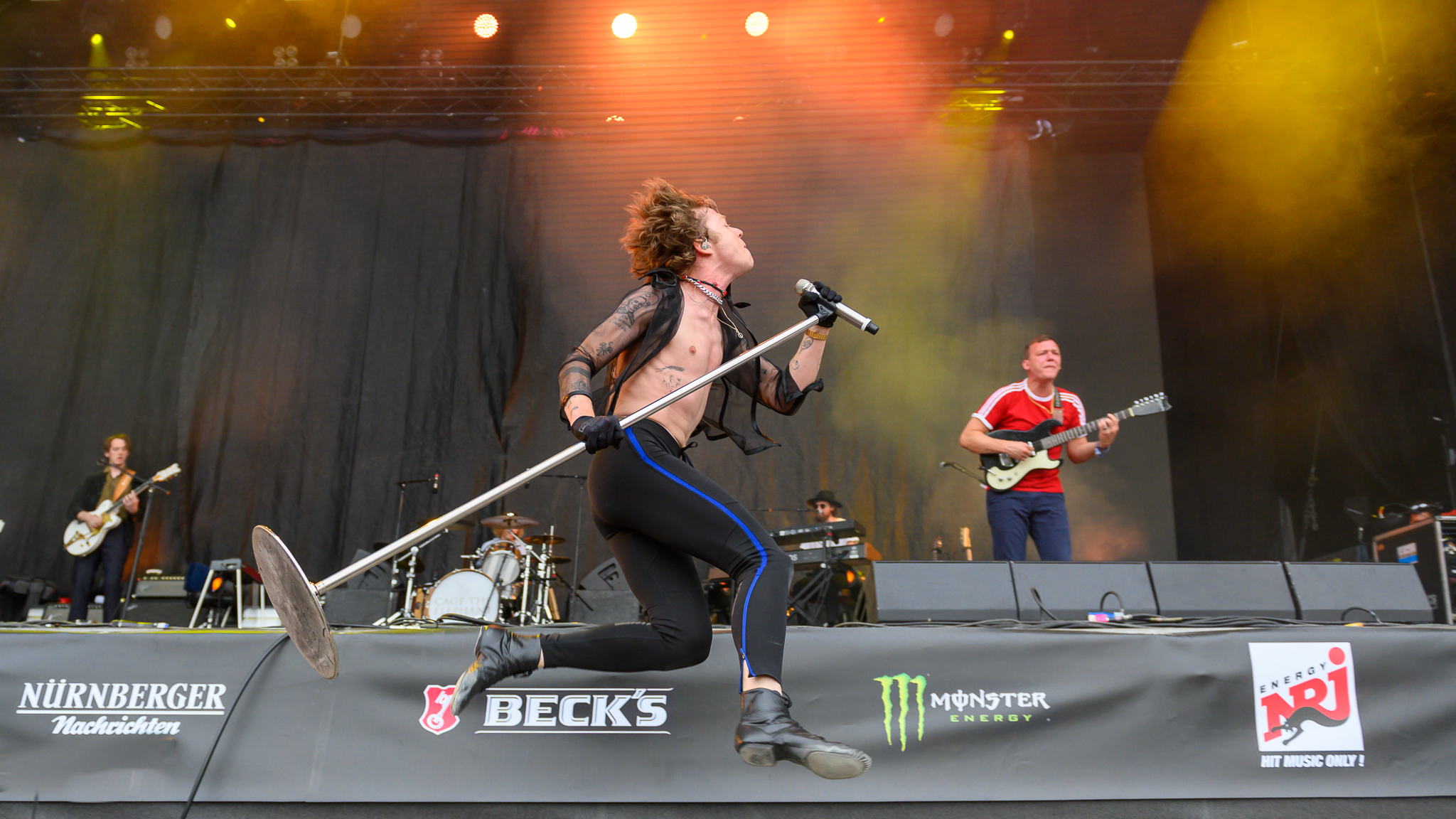
Cage the Elephant performing in 2019

On November 26, 2018, the band announced on Twitter that their new album was "Done. Mixed. Mastered." On January 7, 2019, they released a sample of a song titled "Ready to Let Go" on their Instagram story. On January 31, the band officially released "Ready to Let Go", the first single off their new album. Social Cues was heavily influenced by lead singer Matt Shultz's divorce from his wife, Juliette Buchs, which occurred in the years leading up to the album's 2019 release. Shultz has stated that the difficult divorce, combined with the deaths of friends, resulted in one of the band's darkest and most personal records. His brother Brad added "We wanted to explore darker textures and cinematic elements," calling Social Cues "a natural evolution" that still retained the band's core energy." The album debuted at number 21 on the Billboard 200 and charted in the top 100 in 10+ other countries. The album was met with positive reception, David Fricke writing for Rolling Stone stated "One of most promising rock bands, Cage the Elephant's singer Matt Shultz's life fell apart — and they made their best album yet." Skin and Bones, Ready To Let Go and Social Cues would all reach number 1 of the alternative charts.

On February 11, 2019, Cage the Elephant announced the "Night Running" summer 2019 co-headlining tour with Beck, who is featured on the Social Cues track "Night Running." It was also featured in the soundtrack to the PlayStation 4 game MLB The Show 19. The album Social Cues was released on April 19, 2019, via RCA Records. A Matt Shultz directed music video for "Ready to Let Go" was released on January 31 as well. The band had to cancel tour dates during their European tour from June 12–20 due to an injury guitarist Nick Bockrath suffered. On September 23, Cage the Elephant announced tour dates in February and March 2020, in the UK and Europe. Supporting acts included Post Animal for the UK leg and SWMRS for the remainder of the European tour. On October 24, Cage the Elephant released a music video for the song "Social Cues" from their album Social Cues. It was shot at Adult Swim's FishCenter Live in Atlanta, Georgia with additional direction from Matt Shultz.

In 2020, Social Cues won the band's second Grammy Award for Best Rock Album at the 62nd Annual Grammy Awards. The band contributed a cover of the Metallica song "The Unforgiven" to the charity tribute album The Metallica Blacklist, released in September 2021. they also played a show alongside Metallica and Greta Van Fleet that same year. In December 2021 Cage the Elephant released limited edition T-shirts, with all the proceeds going to support tornado victims and relief in Kentucky.

In 2022 Cage the Elephant hardly toured, this was a result of frontman Matt Shultz experiencing a severe mental health crisis triggered by an adverse reaction to prescribed ADHD medication, which led to paranoid delusions and a break from reality. This ultimately resulted in an event on January 5, 2023, where Shultz was arrested in New York on charges of felony firearm possession. Shultz was staying at The Bowery Hotel in Manhattan, where a hotel employee reportedly saw him carrying a firearm into the bathroom and called 9-1-1. In June, he made a plea deal, avoiding jail time, as well as allowing him to wipe the charges from his record should he "stay out of trouble for one year."

=== Neon Pill (2024–2025) ===
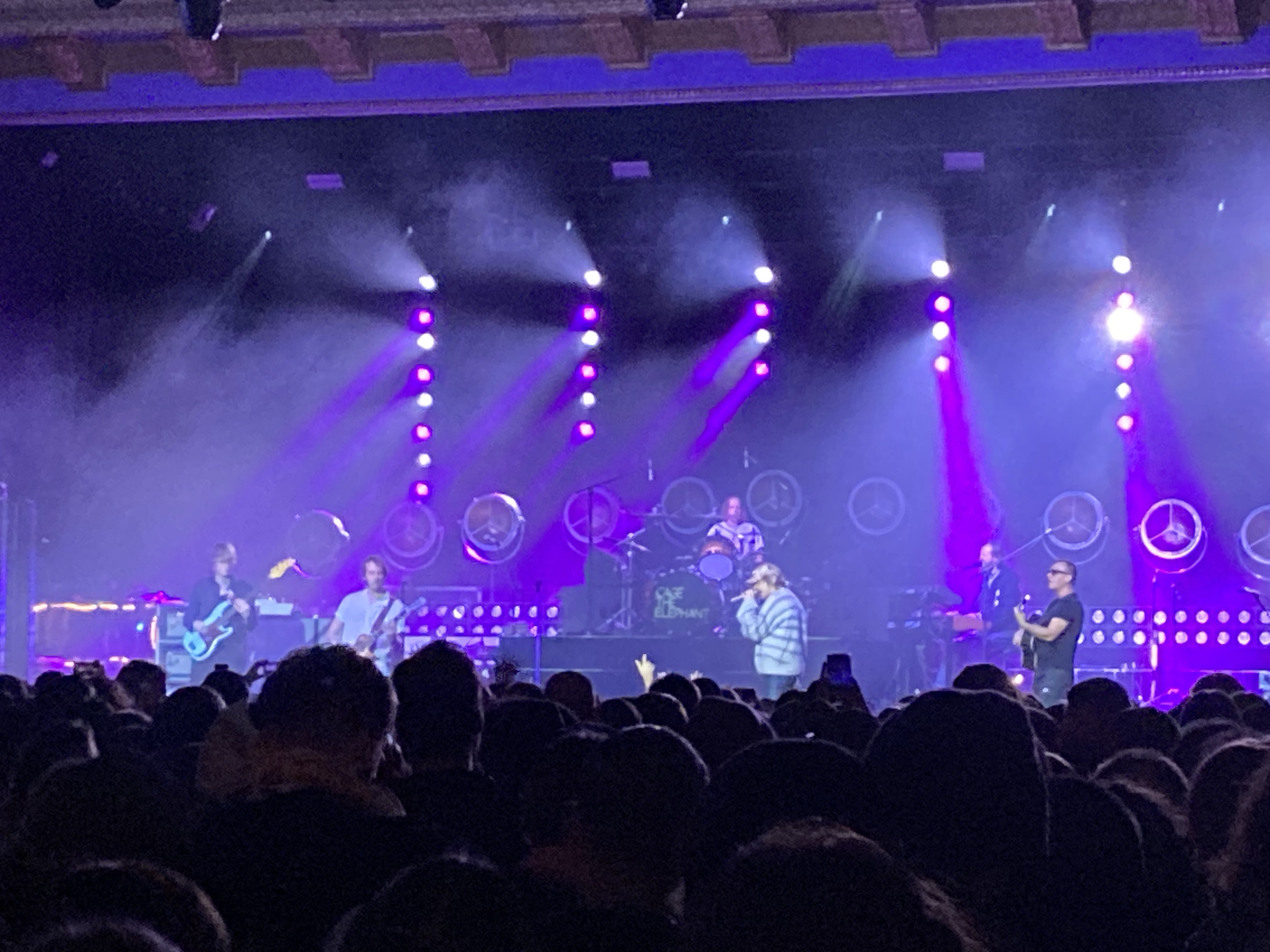
Cage the Elephant performing at FM 102/1 Big Snow Show 18 2024

Following Shultz's arrest he went into recovery after which he reunited with the band and they continued to work on the album that they had started working on years prior. On January 19, 2024, after five years without releasing new music, the band released the single "Neon Pill". It was produced with John Hill and recorded at Sonic Ranch in Tornillo, Texas and was followed by the single "Good Time" on April 4, 2024. They debuted the third single "Rainbow" on Jimmy Kimmel Live! on May 8. Their sixth studio album of the same name as the former was then released on May 17, 2024. Guitarist Brad Shultz commented on the album stating "Every record has its journey and this was the longest amount of time it took us to make a record, but it was meant to be what it was." He also stated that the recording process "had a lot of starts and stops but when we actually started making the record, it was maybe a month and we were done." The album debuted at number 57 on the Billboard 200 and was met with generally positive reviews. The song Metaverse was featured in the soundtrack of NHL 25. Three songs from the album reached number 1 on the Billboard Alternative Airplay charts: Neon Pill, Metaverse and Rainbow. This brought the band's total to 13, tying both Green Day and Linkin Park for second-most.

The band then embarked on the "Neon Pill tour" marking their first tour nearly two years in support of the album the American leg was supported by Young the Giant and Bakar and the European leg was supported by Sunflower Bean. This tour became the highest grossing of their career, with sales of over 440,000 tickets, generating $25 million. They also made an appearance on The Tonight Show Starring Jimmy Fallon, playing their song "Rainbow". In late 2024 the band's song "Cigarette Daydreams" became their first song to reach 1 billion streams on Spotify. On October 10, 2024, CBS Mornings aired a segment featuring Matt and Brad where Matt opened up about his psychosis.

Neon Pill was nominated for Best Alternative Music Performance at the 67th Annual Grammy Awards in 2025. From late August to early September 2025 Cage The Elephant opened for all stops of the North American leg of the Oasis Live '25 reunion tour. They then went on their own North American headlining tour in the Fall with hey, nothing serving as support.

=== Dying in Reverse (2026–present) ===
On July 10, 2026, it was announced the band had signed with Big Loud Rock, and released a new single "Beaches in Tennessee". On the same day, it was announced the band had a new "full-length... LP" in the works with the label. In early 2027, the band will embark on the "Dying in Reverse" European tour. On November 5, 2026, the band released a new single "Make it Easy" and announced the album's title Dying in Reverse, set for release on February 5, 2027.

== Members ==
Current

- Matt Shultz – lead vocals (2006–present), rhythm guitar (2015–present)
- Brad Shultz – rhythm guitar, keyboards (2006–present)
- Daniel Tichenor – bass, backing vocals (2006–present)
- Jared Champion – drums, percussion (2006–present)
- Nick Bockrath – lead guitar, keyboards, backing vocals (2017–present)
- Matthan Minster – keyboards, rhythm guitar, backing vocals (2017–present)

Former

- Lincoln Parish – lead guitar, keyboards (2006–2013)

== Style and lyrical themes ==
During their early years the band was influenced by classic rock and folk bands such as The Rolling Stones, Jimi Hendrix and The Beatles. But later on during the band's time in London, their exposure to bands such as Nirvana, Foals and Gang of Four helped shape their early alt rock and punk sound. Lead singer Matt Shultz cites bands such as the Pixies as influential on his vocal style.

Throughout the band's tenure they have been known for their evolving sound and ability to fuse genres together. Starting out with their debut self titled album that had more of a garage rock sound. But with every new album that came out after the band has intentionally taken a different direction in sound and style. This change can be heard in the band's third studio album Melophobia, in which the band moved beyond their usual garage rock and funky blues rock sound. They incorporated numerous sounds and instruments, which resulted in a more dark and mellow sound along with elements of psychedelic rock while still keeping some of the blues style seen in their first two albums. These elements contributed to a change in the band's sound. On top of this, the band values immediacy where they often forego over polished production resulting in a more emotional impact. This was exemplified in the band's fourth studio album Tell Me I'm Pretty, where they worked alongside Dan Auerbach, who pushed the band to embrace first takes and avoid overthinking.

Some of the themes the band covered in their first two albums had to do with not selling out. The album Thank You, Happy Birthday made this point with tracks like "Sell Yourself" and "Shake Me Down". Many of the band's songs especially from their more recent albums are rooted in experiences of the lead singer Matt Shultz. This is most prominently seen in their fifth studio album Social Cues, which was written in the aftermath of his divorce. The album channeled Shultz's grief and emotional fragmentation into lyrics exploring identity, melancholy, isolation and disconnection. The death of close friends and family, including Matt and Brad's cousin and Brad's father-in-law, deeply influenced not only the lyrics but also the instrumentation of the record. Throughout the album they also critique the superficiality and pressures that come with fame, while also showing how it can lead to destructive behavior and distort one's perception of success. The band's most recent album Neon Pill touches upon mental health problems, addiction and resilience, including Shultz's own personal battle of trying to find happiness while struggling with his mental health problems alongside his arrest.

== Discography ==
Studio albums

- Cage the Elephant (2008)
- Thank You, Happy Birthday (2011)
- Melophobia (2013)
- Tell Me I'm Pretty (2015)
- Social Cues (2019)
- Neon Pill (2024)
- Dying in Reverse (2027)

== Awards and nominations ==
Grammy Awards

Year	Work/nominee	Award	Result
2015	Melophobia	Best Alternative Music Album	Nominated
2017	Tell Me I'm Pretty	Best Rock Album	Won
2020	Social Cues	Best Rock Album	Won
2025	"Neon Pill"	Best Alternative Music Performance	Nominated

iHeartRadio Music Awards

Year	Work/nominee	Award	Result
2016	"Cigarette Daydreams"	Alternative Rock Song of the Year	Nominated
2017	Cage the Elephant	Alternative Rock Artist of the Year	Nominated
2017	"Trouble"	Alternative Rock Song of the Year	Nominated
2020	Cage the Elephant	Alternative Rock Artist of the Year	Nominated
2020	"Ready to Let Go"	Alternative Rock Song of the Year	Nominated
2021	Cage the Elephant	Alternative Rock Artist of the Year	Nominated
2025	Cage the Elephant	Alternative Rock Artist of the Year	Nominated
2025	"Neon Pill"	Alternative Rock Song of the Year	Nominated
2026	Cage the Elephant	Alternative Artist of the Year	Nominated

MTV Video Music Awards

Year	Work/nominee	Award	Result
2011	"Shake Me Down"	Best Rock Video	Nominated

Teens choice awards

Year	Work/nominee	Award	Result
2019	"Ready to Let Go"	Choice Rock/Alternative Song	Nominated
2019	Cage the Elephant	Choice Rock Artist	Nominated

Rolling Stone reader's poll

Year	Work/nominee	Award	Result
2011	Cage the Elephant	Best New Artist	Won

== Tours ==
- The Cage The Elephant Tour 2010 (23 shows)
- Thank You, Happy Birthday Tour 2012 (48 shows)
- The Melophobia Tour 2013 into 2014 (49 shows)
- The Tell Me I'm Pretty Tour 2015 (34 shows)
- The Spring Rock AF 2016 Tour (16 shows)
- Live and Unpeeled Acoustic Tour 2017 (11 shows)
- The Night Running Tour 2019 (featuring Beck) (31 shows)
- The Neon Pill Tour 2024 into 2025 (65 shows)
- Cage the Elephant Fall tour (featuring hey, nothing) (2025)
