= Brad Shultz =

American guitarist

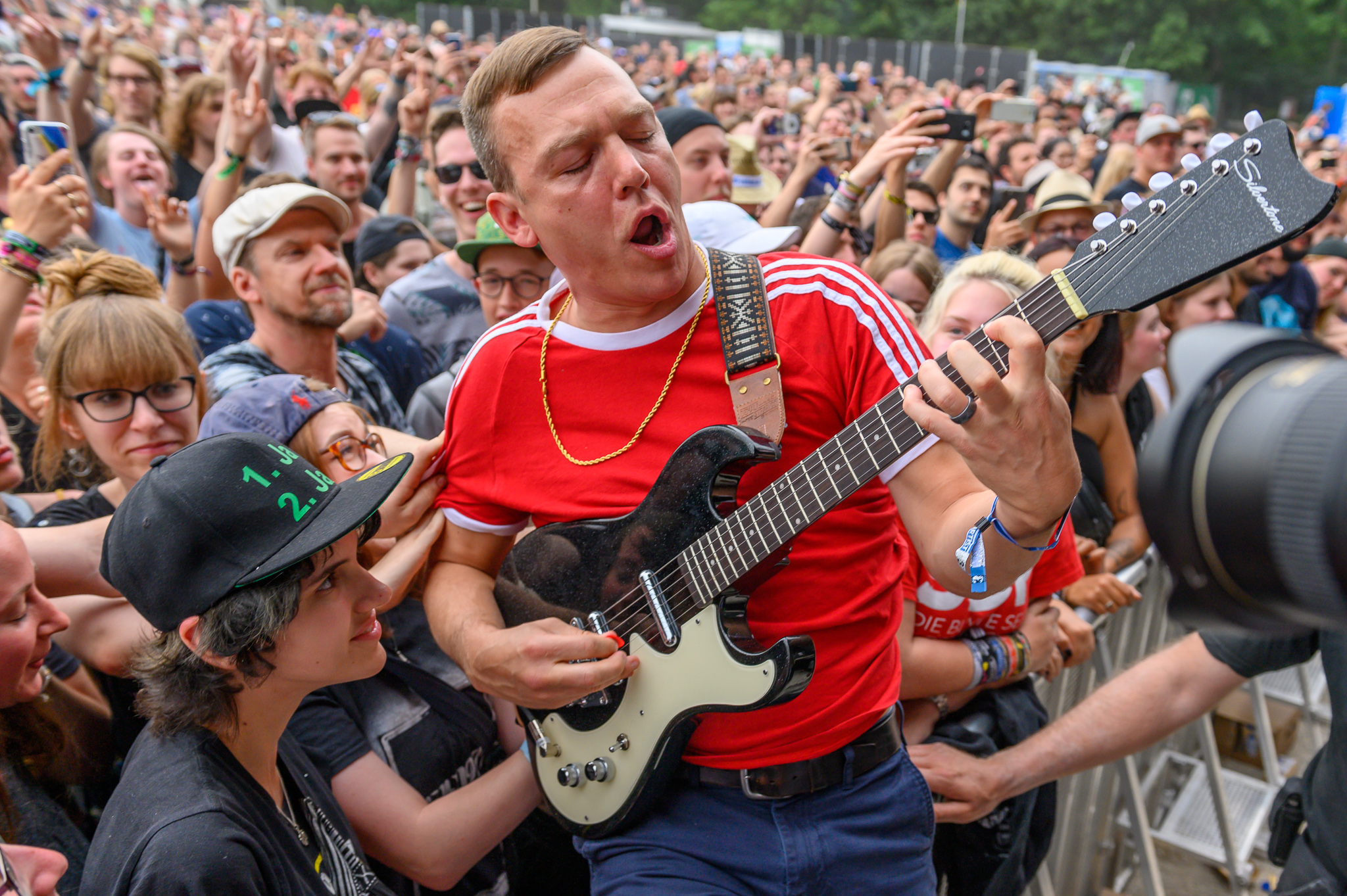
- Brad Shultz performing at Rock im Park 2019

Background information
- Born: May 15, 1982 (age 44); Bowling Green, Kentucky, U.S.
- Occupations: Musician; songwriter; producer
- Instruments: Guitar; keyboards

Donald Bradley Shultz Jr. (born May 15, 1982) is an American musician. He is the rhythm guitarist and one of the founding members of the band Cage the Elephant, and is also a record producer. He is the older brother to current Cage the Elephant bandmate, Matt Shultz.

== Early life ==
Donald Bradley Shultz Jr. was born on May 15, 1982, and was raised in Bowling Green, Kentucky. His father, Donald Bradley Shultz Sr., was also a singer-songwriter. Growing up, Shultz came from a poor background alongside his younger brother, Matthew, which subjected them to teasing from their peers at school. The first music he was exposed to was gospel music. However, as he got older he started listening to different genres, stating, "When I was 12 or 13, I would actually start sneaking music like Nirvana, Pearl Jam, shit like that. I actually had a Jimi Hendrix cassette tape, and my dad would find it and take it away from me, and then I'd steal it back from him." Their parents divorced, which inspired them to begin writing music while they lived with their grandparents in a trailer park. He attended Greenwood High School.

== Career ==
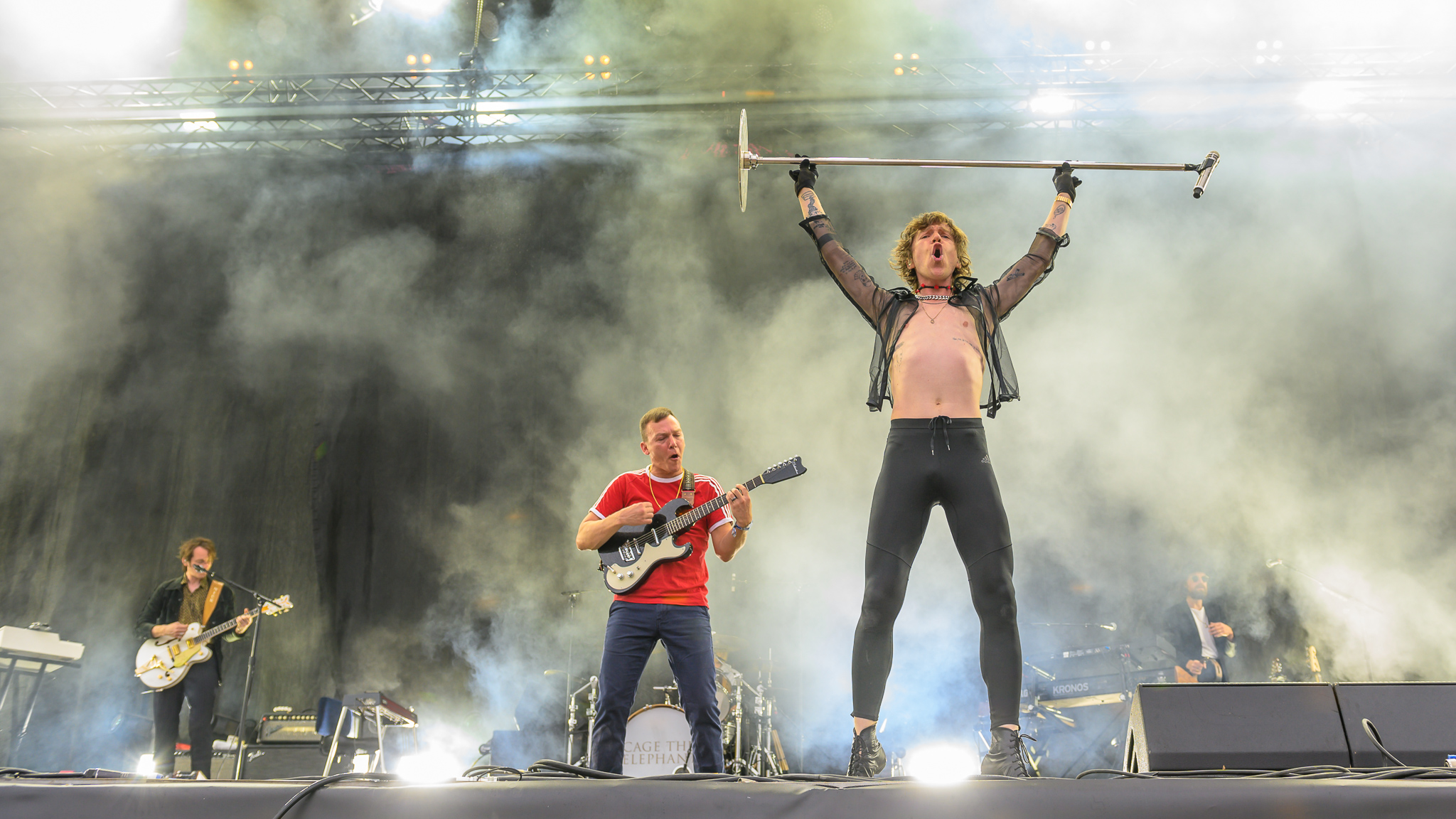
Shultz in red performing alongside his brother Matt and fellow guitarist Nick Bockrath

Before Cage the Elephant, Shultz was in a band with current bandmates Jared Champion and Matt Shultz known as Perfect Confusion. Perfect Confusion formed in 2001, and played smaller music venues around their hometown, Bowling Green, Kentucky, and released one self-titled album. The band broke up in 2005, but the former members occasionally have reunions and performances.

After Cage the Elephant formed in 2006, Shultz, along with the rest of the band, moved to the United Kingdom to gain moderate success with their self-titled debut LP, releasing in Europe on June 23, 2008, and in the United States on March 24, 2009. The group has since released five more studio albums. Shultz is known for his dynamic performances during live shows, including "signature jumps" and high-energy antics.

Along with being a member of Cage the Elephant, he is a record producer. He has produced Juliette Lewis' Future Deep EP; Nashville band Bad Cop/Bad Cop's The Light On EP; Bowling Green band Dan Luke and The Raid's debut LP, Out Of The Blue; and most recently Tampa Bay band Glove's debut album Boom Nights, which one Rolling Stone staffer picked as the sixth-best album of 2022.

In 2025 Shultz joined with Daniel Oakley and Darren Potuck to form the record label Parallel Vision.

Shultz features on and produced the song "Chasing The Good Times" by The Runarounds which was released on November 14, 2025.

== Gear and influences ==
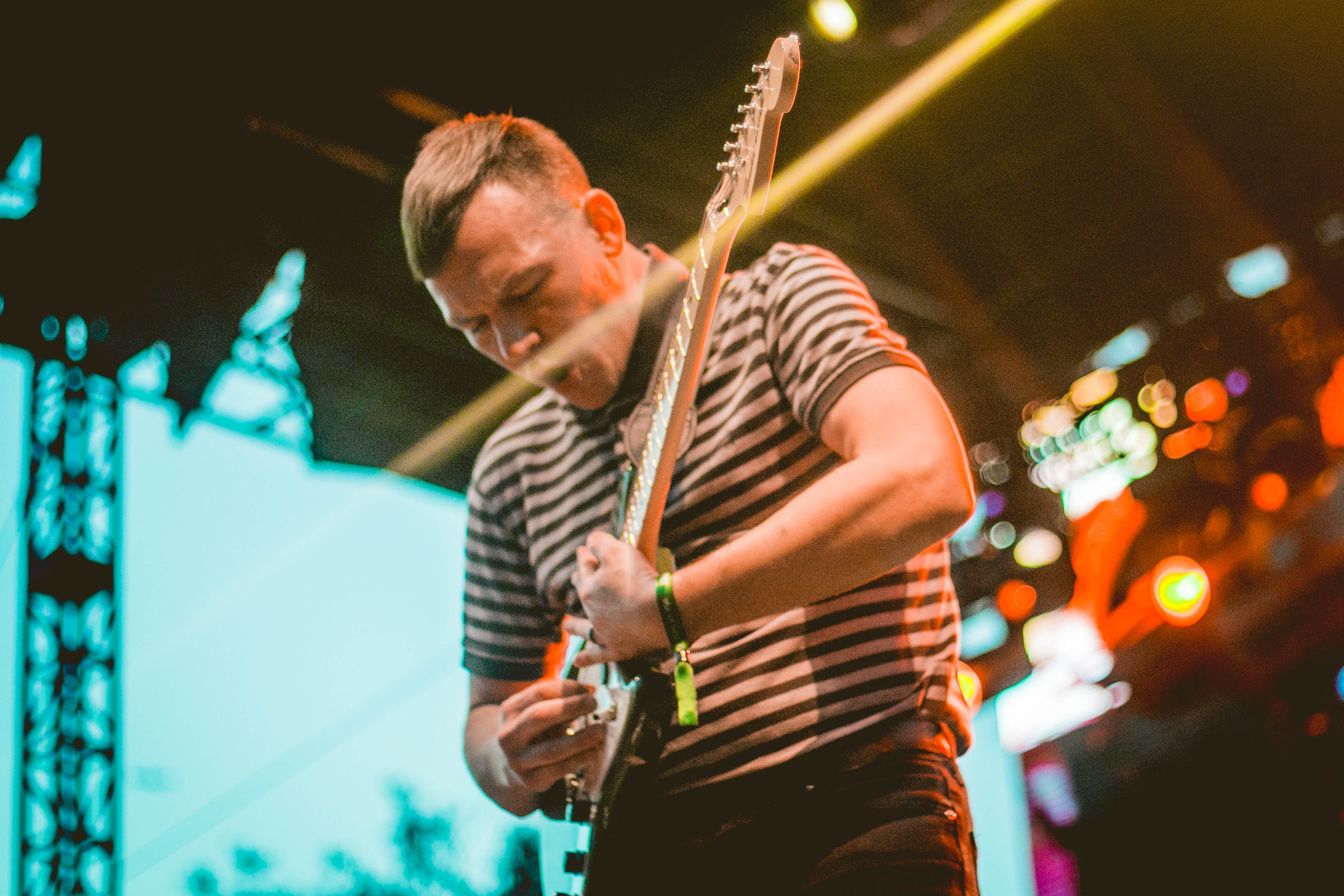
Shultz in 2017

During Cage the Elephant's earlier years Shultz used Fender Mustangs, Telecasters and Jazzmasters, most being heavily modified or glued together due to the band's more raucous music. In 2019 Shultz started using a Silverstone 1149. He also uses multiple fenders and a couple of Gibsons.

Shultz sometimes rewires or selects guitar wiring differently in the studio versus live. For live, he might simplify (e.g. disconnect some pickups) so switches do not get in the way when he is moving around. To get his recording tone, he uses preamps and compressors in rack units, rather than just cranking the amp. These help him preserve clarity, especially with heavy effects or fuzz.

Shultz has stated that he started using Fender guitars due to seeing Jimi Hendrix use them. Other guitarists and bands he cites as an influence include Kurt Cobain, Dinosaur Jr., The Pixies, and Gang of Four, specifically Andy Gill. More recently Shultz has cited his own father as an influence; in a 2024 interview he stated, "One thing that I didn't necessarily expect in reflecting on my father's life is that I would be very inspired by his music."

== Personal life ==
In May 2007, Shultz married his wife, Lindsay. In September 2013, the Shultzes' first child was born. In November 2019, the couple welcomed their second child.

On August 2, 2017, Shultz threw out the ceremonial first pitch at a Chicago Cubs game.

== Accolades ==
Cage the Elephant has been nominated for Grammy Awards four times, winning twice, but as a solo artist Shultz has not been nominated as a solo artist or producer.

== Discography ==
=== Perfect Confusion ===
- Perfect Confusion (2005)

=== Cage the Elephant ===
- Cage the Elephant (2008)
- Thank You, Happy Birthday (2011)
- Melophobia (2013)
- Tell Me I'm Pretty (2015)
- Social Cues (2019)
- Neon Pill (2024)

=== Guest appearances ===
- "The Lonesome Death of Hattie Carroll" (2012 Chimes of Freedom)
- "The Unforgiven" (2021 The Metallica Blacklist)

=== Production discography ===
Producing credits for Brad Shultz
Year	Artist	Work
2013	Bad Cop	The Light On EP
2016	Juliette Lewis	Future Deep EP
2019	Seratones	Power LP
2019	Dan Luke and The Raid	Out Of The Blue LP
2022	Glove	Boom Nights LP
2025	Girl Tones	Got It EP
2025	The Runarounds	Chasing The Good Times Single
2026	Common People	Games EP
