= Jared Champion =

American drummer

- Born: February 27, 1983 (age 43); Bowling Green, Kentucky, United States
- Genres: Alternative rock; garage rock; punk blues; blues rock; indie rock
- Occupations: Musician; songwriter
- Instruments: Drums; percussion; guitar
- Years active: 2001–present
- Label: RCA Records

Jared Lloyd Champion (born February 27, 1983) is the drummer for American rock band Cage the Elephant.

== Early life and career ==
Champion was born and raised in Bowling Green, Kentucky. In high school, Champion, with current bandmate Matt Shultz, were in a cover band called Liquid Twilight. Champion needed a singer for the cover band, so Shultz agreed to do it. It is unknown when they broke up. However, Champion and Shultz left Liquid Twilight because they wanted to write original music.

Champion competed for Greenwood High School in Bowling Green in 100 butterfly and 200 individual medley.

== Career ==
After Liquid Twilight came to an end, Champion—along with Matt and Brad Shultz—were in a band that formed in 2001 called Perfect Confusion, which also included members Thomas Bullen (lead guitar)–who later joined Bowling Green band Sleeper Agent–and David Kem (bass) The group released one self titled album in 2005. Although the band broke up in 2005, the members occasionally have reunions and perform at Tidball's, a Bowling Green bar and local music venue.

He then formed Cage the Elephant in 2006 alongside Matt and Brad Shultz, Champion, along with the rest of the band, moved to the United Kingdom to gain moderate success with their self-titled debut LP, releasing in Europe on June 23, 2008, and in the United States on March 24, 2009.

Following the release of the band's second studio LP, Thank You, Happy Birthday, Champion's appendix burst during a concert while touring with Foo Fighters. Former Nirvana drummer and Foo Fighters' frontman, Dave Grohl, took Champion's place as the drummer for 3 shows during the tour while Champion was being hospitalized. In 2014, while touring to promote Cage the Elephant's third studio LP, Melophobia, Champion took family leave. Kyle Davis, drummer for Nashville band Chrome Pony, took his place during the shows Champion missed.

In March, 2014, Champion played drums on Juliette Lewis' EP, Future Deep, that was produced by bandmate Brad Shultz.

From June 5 to 8, 2017, Champion played with The 8G Band on the late-night show Late Night with Seth Meyers.

Champion is an endorser of Masters of Maple drums, using a custom made kit and Zildjian cymbals plus Promark sticks and Evans heads.

Champion also has a musical act with his daughter and one of his friends called Castle Champ. It has an experimental feel with several genres mixed in. They released their first album on May 19, 2023.

== Personal life ==
In November 2014, Champion's first daughter was born. In June 2016, he proposed to his now wife, Alicia. In July 2017, Champion and Alicia got married. In January 2019, the couple welcomed their second daughter.

Outside of Cage the Elephant, Champion composes instrumental and hip-hop pieces as a hobby. In late 2015 to early 2016, he scored a short film featured in the Nashville Film Festival. Champion is a keen soccer fan and an avid supporter of Arsenal F.C.

== Accomplishments ==
In 2014, Cage the Elephant was nominated for the Best Alternative Music Album for Melophobia, at the 57th Annual Grammy Awards. In 2016, Cage the Elephant won the Grammy Award for Best Rock Album for Tell Me I'm Pretty, winning again in 2019 for Social Cues. In 2025 the band's song "Neon Pill" was nominated for best Alternative Music Performance at the 67th annual Grammys.

== Discography ==
=== Perfect Confusion ===
- Perfect Confusion (2005)

=== Cage the Elephant ===
Main article: Cage the Elephant discography

- Cage the Elephant (2008)
- Thank You, Happy Birthday (2011)
- Melophobia (2013)
- Tell Me I'm Pretty (2015)
- Social Cues (2019)
- Neon Pill (2024)

Guest appearances

- “The Lonesome Death of Hattie Carroll” (2012 Chimes of Freedom)
- "The Unforgiven" (2021 The Metallica Blacklist)

=== Juliette Lewis ===
- Future Deep (2016)

=== Castle Camp ===
- “The Little Drummer Boy” (Single 2023)
- “Best Xmas Song Ever” (Single 2023)
- No We Go (2023)
- Parenting l0l. (2023)
- Castle Champ 3 (2024)
- The Hellabaloo Holdup at Castle Champ (2024)
- 4 the Feelers (2025)
