= List of Billboard Alternative Songs number ones of the 2010s =

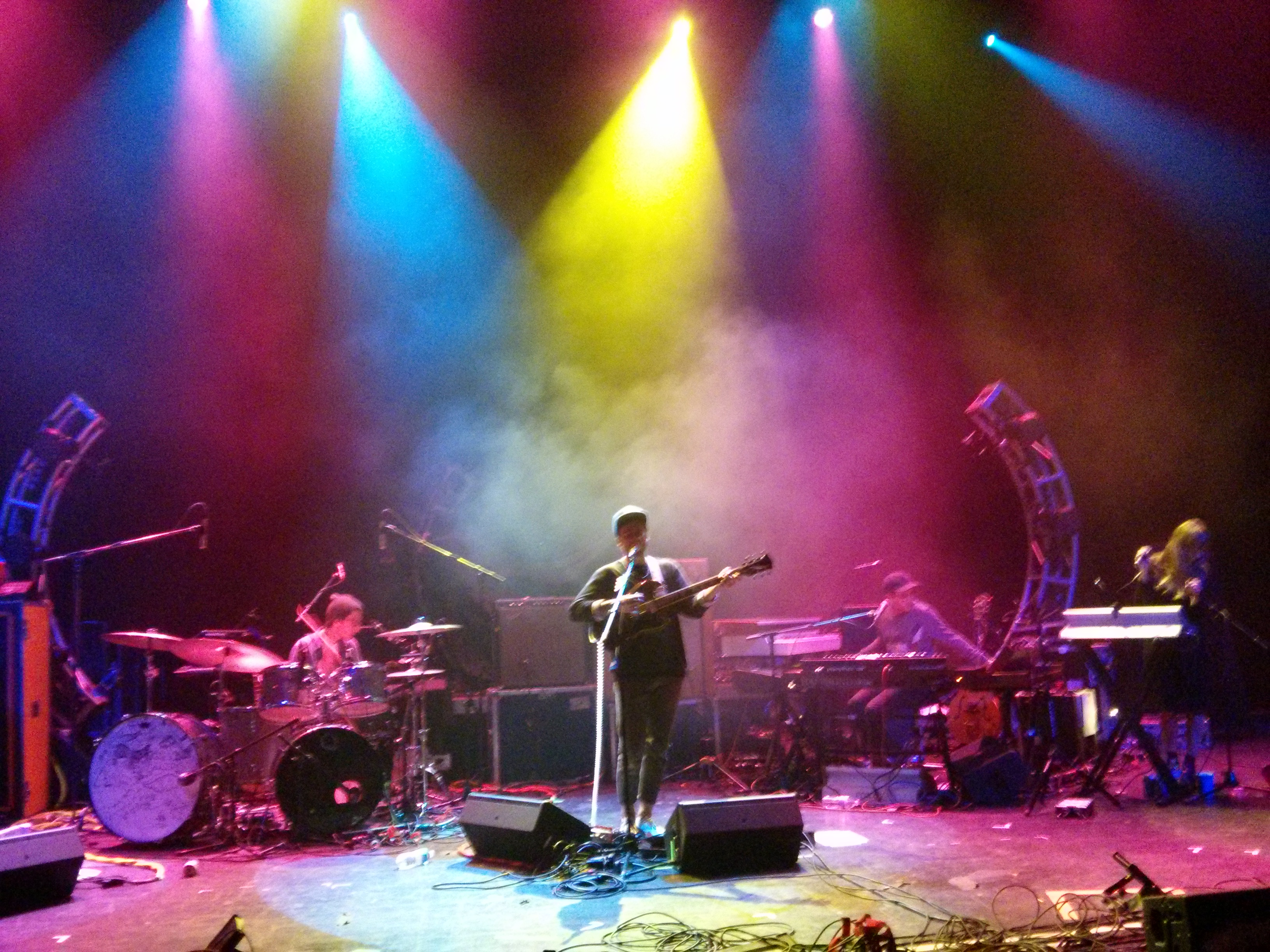
American rock band Portugal. The Man performed "Feel It Still", which spent a record-breaking 20 weeks atop the Alternative Songs chart.

Alternative Airplay is a record chart published by the music industry magazine Billboard that ranks the most-played songs on American modern rock radio stations. It was introduced by Billboard in September 1988. During the 2010s, the chart was named Alternative Songs and based on electronically monitored airplay data compiled by Nielsen Broadcast Data Systems from a panel of national rock radio stations, with songs being ranked by their total number of spins per week.

115 songs topped the Alternative Songs chart during the 2010s. The first number one of the 2010s was "Uprising" by Muse, while the last was "Orphans" by Coldplay. From October 2012 to February 2013, Muse's song "Madness" topped the chart for 19 non-consecutive weeks, breaking the record for the most weeks spent at number one by a song in the chart's history. In 2017, "Feel It Still" by Portugal. The Man broke this record by topping the chart for 20 weeks. The American band Cage the Elephant attained nine Alternative Songs number-one hits during the 2010s, the most by any artist within the decade.

== Number-one songs ==
Key

† – Billboard year-end number-one song
↑ – Return of a song to number one

Song	Artist	Reached number one	Weeks at number one
"Uprising" †	Muse	October 17, 2009	15
"Kings and Queens"	Thirty Seconds to Mars	January 30, 2010	3
"1901"	Phoenix	February 20, 2010	2
"Back Against the Wall"	Cage the Elephant	March 6, 2010	2
"Resistance"	Muse	March 20, 2010	3
"Mountain Man"	Crash Kings	April 10, 2010	1
"Resistance" ↑	Muse	April 17, 2010	1
"Between the Lines"	Stone Temple Pilots	April 24, 2010	3
"Lay Me Down"	The Dirty Heads featuring Rome Ramirez	May 15, 2010	11
"This Is War"	Thirty Seconds to Mars	July 31, 2010	1
"In One Ear"	Cage the Elephant	August 7, 2010	4
"The Catalyst"	Linkin Park	September 4, 2010	4
"Animal"	Neon Trees	October 2, 2010	1
"Little Lion Man"	Mumford & Sons	October 9, 2010	1
"Radioactive"	Kings of Leon	October 16, 2010	3
"Tighten Up"	The Black Keys	November 6, 2010	9
"Waiting for the End"	Linkin Park	January 8, 2011	3
"Tighten Up" ↑	The Black Keys	January 29, 2011	1
"Waiting for the End" ↑	Linkin Park	February 5, 2011	1
"Shake Me Down"	Cage the Elephant	February 12, 2011	6
"Rope"	Foo Fighters	March 26, 2011	13
"Pumped Up Kicks" †	Foster the People	June 25, 2011	2
"You Are a Tourist"	Death Cab for Cutie	July 9, 2011	1
"Pumped Up Kicks" ↑ †	Foster the People	July 16, 2011	3
"Walk"	Foo Fighters	August 6, 2011	2
"The Adventures of Rain Dance Maggie"	Red Hot Chili Peppers	August 20, 2011	4
"Walk" ↑	Foo Fighters	September 17, 2011	6
"The Sound of Winter"	Bush	October 29, 2011	5
"Paradise"	Coldplay	December 3, 2011	1
"The Sound of Winter" ↑	Bush	December 10, 2011	1
"Lonely Boy"	The Black Keys	December 17, 2011	11
"Somebody That I Used to Know" †	Gotye featuring Kimbra	March 3, 2012	7
"We Are Young"	Fun featuring Janelle Monáe	April 21, 2012	2
"Somebody That I Used to Know" ↑ †	Gotye featuring Kimbra	May 5, 2012	5
"Gold on the Ceiling"	The Black Keys	June 9, 2012	3
"Tongue Tied"	Grouplove	June 30, 2012	1
"Gold on the Ceiling" ↑	The Black Keys	July 7, 2012	2
"Little Talks"	Of Monsters and Men	July 21, 2012	2
"Burn It Down"	Linkin Park	August 4, 2012	1
"Some Nights"	Fun	August 11, 2012	2
"Too Close"	Alex Clare	August 25, 2012	4
"Some Nights" ↑	Fun	September 22, 2012	1
"Ho Hey"	The Lumineers	September 29, 2012	2
"Madness"	Muse	October 13, 2012	1
"I Will Wait"	Mumford & Sons	October 20, 2012	1
"Madness" ↑	Muse	October 27, 2012	18
"Radioactive" †	Imagine Dragons	March 2, 2013	13
"Sweater Weather"	The Neighbourhood	June 1, 2013	2
"Safe and Sound"	Capital Cities	June 15, 2013	1
"Sweater Weather" ↑	The Neighbourhood	June 22, 2013	9
"Royals"	Lorde	August 24, 2013	7
"Out of My League"	Fitz and the Tantrums	October 12, 2013	2
"Pompeii"	Bastille	October 26, 2013	4
"Come a Little Closer"	Cage the Elephant	November 23, 2013	10
"Do I Wanna Know?" †	Arctic Monkeys	February 1, 2014	10
"Come with Me Now"	Kongos	April 12, 2014	3
"The Walker"	Fitz and the Tantrums	May 3, 2014	1
"Come with Me Now" ↑	Kongos	May 10, 2014	2
"Fever"	The Black Keys	May 24, 2014	11
"I Wanna Get Better"	Bleachers	August 9, 2014	1
"Dangerous"	Big Data featuring Joywave	August 16, 2014	1
"Riptide"	Vance Joy	August 23, 2014	5
"Stolen Dance"	Milky Chance	September 27, 2014	10
"Something from Nothing"	Foo Fighters	December 6, 2014	8
"Cigarette Daydreams"	Cage the Elephant	January 31, 2015	4
"Shut Up and Dance"	Walk the Moon	February 28, 2015	4
"Lampshades on Fire"	Modest Mouse	March 28, 2015	3
"Believe"	Mumford & Sons	April 18, 2015	3
"Hollow Moon (Bad Wolf)"	Awolnation	May 9, 2015	2
"Dead Inside"	Muse	May 23, 2015	5
"Renegades" †	X Ambassadors	June 27, 2015	11
"First"	Cold War Kids	September 12, 2015	1
"Ex's & Oh's"	Elle King	September 19, 2015	3
"First" ↑	Cold War Kids	October 10, 2015	6
"Stressed Out"	Twenty One Pilots	November 21, 2015	12
"Mess Around"	Cage the Elephant	February 13, 2016	1
"Adventure of a Lifetime"	Coldplay	February 20, 2016	2
"Mess Around" ↑	Cage the Elephant	March 5, 2016	2
"Mountain at My Gates"	Foals	March 19, 2016	1
"Trip Switch"	Nothing but Thieves	March 26, 2016	2
"Ride"	Twenty One Pilots	April 9, 2016	6
"Spirits"	The Strumbellas	May 21, 2016	2
"Ride" ↑	Twenty One Pilots	June 4, 2016	1
"Ophelia" †	The Lumineers	June 11, 2016	4
"Bored to Death"	Blink-182	July 9, 2016	5
"Dark Necessities"	Red Hot Chili Peppers	August 13, 2016	1
"Way Down We Go"	Kaleo	August 20, 2016	2
"Trouble"	Cage the Elephant	September 3, 2016	1
"Heathens"	Twenty One Pilots	September 10, 2016	9
"Bang Bang"	Green Day	November 12, 2016	1
"Heathens" ↑	Twenty One Pilots	November 19, 2016	2
"Waste a Moment"	Kings of Leon	December 3, 2016	1
"All We Ever Knew"	The Head and the Heart	December 10, 2016	1
"Waste a Moment" ↑	Kings of Leon	December 17, 2016	3
"Take It All Back"	Judah & the Lion	January 7, 2017	4
"Still Breathing"	Green Day	February 4, 2017	5
"Cleopatra"	The Lumineers	March 11, 2017	2
"Human"	Rag'n'Bone Man	March 25, 2017	1
"Believer" †	Imagine Dragons	April 1, 2017	7
"Wish I Knew You"	The Revivalists	May 20, 2017	1
"Believer" ↑ †	Imagine Dragons	May 27, 2017	6
"Feel It Still"	Portugal. The Man	July 8, 2017	17
"Thunder"	Imagine Dragons	November 4, 2017	3
"Feel It Still" ↑	Portugal. The Man	November 25, 2017	3
"Up All Night"	Beck	December 16, 2017	7
"One Foot"	Walk the Moon	January 27, 2018	4
"No Roots"	Alice Merton	February 24, 2018	1
"Sober Up"	AJR featuring Rivers Cuomo	March 3, 2018	2
"Whatever It Takes"	Imagine Dragons	March 17, 2018	2
"Live in the Moment"	Portugal. The Man	March 31, 2018	2
"Whatever It Takes" ↑	Imagine Dragons	April 14, 2018	1
"Broken" †	Lovelytheband	April 21, 2018	7
"Thought Contagion"	Muse	June 9, 2018	1
"Broken" ↑ †	Lovelytheband	June 16, 2018	2
"Say Amen (Saturday Night)"	Panic! at the Disco	June 30, 2018	1
"I Feel Like I'm Drowning"	Two Feet	July 7, 2018	2
"Say Amen (Saturday Night)" ↑	Panic! at the Disco	July 21, 2018	1
"Jumpsuit"	Twenty One Pilots	July 28, 2018	2
"Africa"	Weezer	August 11, 2018	3
"Jumpsuit" ↑	Twenty One Pilots	September 1, 2018	1
"Natural"	Imagine Dragons	September 8, 2018	9
"Happier"	Marshmello and Bastille	November 10, 2018	1
"High Hopes"	Panic! at the Disco	November 17, 2018	10
"Guiding Light"	Mumford & Sons	January 26, 2019	1
"High Hopes" ↑	Panic! at the Disco	February 2, 2019	6
"Ready to Let Go"	Cage the Elephant	March 16, 2019	6
"Chlorine"	Twenty One Pilots	April 27, 2019	3
"Lo/Hi"	The Black Keys	May 18, 2019	1
"Bury a Friend"	Billie Eilish	May 25, 2019	2
"Trampoline" †	Shaed	June 8, 2019	2
"Gloria"	The Lumineers	June 22, 2019	5
"Missed Connection"	The Head and the Heart	July 27, 2019	2
"Bad Guy"	Billie Eilish	August 10, 2019	2
"Cringe"	Matt Maeson	August 24, 2019	4
"3 Nights"	Dominic Fike	September 21, 2019	1
"Doin' Time"	Lana Del Rey	September 28, 2019	3
"Social Cues"	Cage the Elephant	October 19, 2019	2
"The Hype"	Twenty One Pilots	November 2, 2019	7
"Orphans"	Coldplay	December 21, 2019	4
