= In One Ear (song) =

Single by Cage the Elephant

from the album Cage the Elephant
- Released: March 24, 2008; August 7, 2010 (re-release)
- Recorded: 2008
- Length: 4:01
- Label: Relentless (UK); Jive/RED (US)
- Songwriters: Jared Champion, Lincoln Parish, Brad Shultz, Matt Shultz, Daniel Tichenor
- Producer: Jay Joyce

Cage the Elephant singles chronology
"Free Love" (2008)	"In One Ear" (2008)	"Ain't No Rest for the Wicked" (2008)

"In One Ear" is a song by American rock band Cage the Elephant. It was released as the second, then re-released as the fifth single from the band's 2008 self-titled debut album. In the re-issue dated August 7, 2010, the single peaked at number one on the Billboard Alternative Songs chart, the band's second number one single on that chart. There was an American version and UK version of the music video.

== Release and reception ==
"In One Ear" was originally released in March 2008 as the second single from the band's self-titled debut album. The single's B-side included an acoustic performance of their song, "Ain't No Rest for the Wicked", recorded for Radio 1's Live Lounge.

The song peaked at number one on Billboard's Alternative Songs chart in August 2010. It also reached number 3 on the Rock Songs chart, and number 56 on the Canadian Hot 100.

== Music video ==
There are three music videos for this song. The first two versions were released in 2008 one as the US version and the other as the UK version. The third music video premiered on April 1, 2010, on Vevo. It was directed by Isaac Rentz and shot on location in Bowling Green, Kentucky.

== In pop culture and performances ==
In 2008 the band performed the song live on Later... With Jools Holland. The song was featured on the season 8 episode of Bevis and Butthead titled Holy Cornholio. It was also used in the season 6 episode 5 of the television show Bones.

== Chart performance ==
=== Weekly charts ===
Chart (2008–2010)	Peak position
Canada Rock (Billboard)	24
Scotland Singles (OCC)	9
UK Singles (OCC)	51
US Hot Rock & Alternative Songs (Billboard)	3

=== Year-end charts ===
Chart (2010)	Position
US Hot Rock Songs (Billboard)	24

== Certifications ==
Region	Certification	Certified units/sales
United States (RIAA)	Platinum	1,000,000^{‡}
^{‡} Sales+streaming figures based on certification alone.

== See also ==
- List of Billboard Alternative Songs number ones of the 2010s
