= Aberdeen (song) =

Single by Cage the Elephant

from the album Thank You, Happy Birthday
- Released: September 15, 2011
- Recorded: 2010–2011
- Studio: Tragedy Studios, Nashville, Tennessee
- Genre: Alternative rock
- Length: 3:12
- Label: Jive (U.S.); Universal (Canada)
- Songwriters: Jared Champion; Lincoln Parish; Brad Shultz; Matt Shultz; Daniel Tichenor
- Producer: Jay Joyce

Cage the Elephant singles chronology
| "Around My Head" (2011) | "Aberdeen" (2011) | "Come a Little Closer" (2013) |

Music videos
- "Aberdeen" on YouTube

"Aberdeen" is a song by American rock band Cage the Elephant. It is the third single from their second studio album, Thank You, Happy Birthday (2011). The song was originally named "Maybelline", but was later changed to "Aberdeen" because Cage the Elephant's lead singer Matt Shultz found himself repeatedly singing the latter city's name while rehearsing in Aberdeen, Scotland.

== Music video ==
The music video is a clay animation video about a clumsy, lonely dragon-like monster who travels to a busy city at night trying to make friends. Instead, he indirectly causes the deaths of three people and a dog, and is eventually killed by the military.

== Track listing ==
Track written by Cage the Elephant.

| No. | Title | Length |
|---|---|---|
| 1. | "Aberdeen" | 3:12 |
| 2. | "Doctor Doctor Doctor Help Me Help Me Help Me" | 2:14 |

== Charts ==
=== Weekly charts ===
Weekly chart performance for "Aberdeen"
| Chart (2011–2012) | Peak position |
|---|---|
| Mexico Ingles Airplay (Billboard) | 40 |
| Canada Rock (Billboard) | 24 |
| US Hot Rock & Alternative Songs (Billboard) | 22 |
| US Rock & Alternative Airplay (Billboard) | 22 |

=== Year-end charts ===
Year-end chart performance for "Aberdeen"
| Chart (2012) | Position |
|---|---|
| US Hot Rock Songs (Billboard) | 71 |
