= Shake Me Down =

Single by Cage the Elephant

from the album Thank You, Happy Birthday
- Released: November 22, 2010
- Recorded: 2010
- Genre: Alternative rock
- Length: 3:32
- Label: Relentless (UK); Jive/RED (US)
- Songwriters: Jared Champion, Lincoln Parish, Brad Shultz, Matt Shultz, Daniel Tichenor
- Producer: Jay Joyce

Cage the Elephant singles chronology
"Back Against the Wall" (2009)	"Shake Me Down" (2010)	"Around My Head" (2011)

Music video
- "Shake Me Down" on YouTube

"Shake Me Down" is the first single and fourth track on Cage the Elephant's second album Thank You, Happy Birthday. A music video for the single was released on January 11, 2011. Both the song and the video gained much critical acclaim, and earned a nomination for Best Rock Video at the 2011 MTV Video Music Awards Rolling Stone described the song as a "all dreamy Beatlesque psychedelia."

== Composition ==
The song features Cage the Elephant percussionist Jared Champion playing on a set of toy drums. The guitar riff was borrowed from a song that bassist Daniel Tichenor's father had written and the bass line was inspired by the Shins. The song is Matthew Shultz singing about life's many depressing aspects in the verses, while the chorus is a short burst of optimism. The song features quiet verses broken by loud drum interludes.

== Music video ==
In the music video, directed by Isaac Rentz, a middle-aged jogger relives vivid memories of his life through a surreal, nostalgic journey. At the end of the video, the man sees his deceased friends and family members, including his wife. The video then shows that the man was dreaming the entire time, and died in his sleep. As his wife cries by his side, the video fades with a blurred view of the man standing next to the shore at a beach. Singer Matthew Shultz is occasionally seen singing in a tent in the man's childhood hideout, while the rest of the band plays through various cut scenes. The music video achieved critical acclaim, and garnered a nomination for Best Rock Video at the 2011 MTV Video Music Awards.

== Reception ==
Tikicobra of Sputnikmusic wrote that the song "is significantly less sarcastic" compared to other songs on the album adding it "features a great opening. And the way it picks up, just so that it can slow down abruptly and then pick up again at the end, is fantastic." The Guardian described the song as a "turbulent daydream” whilst Rolling Stone wrote the song is a "all dreamy Beatlesque psychedelia."

== Chart performance ==
The single proved to be their most successful in the UK despite not being their highest charting; it spent 6 weeks in the top 100 at number 99, 87, 78, 58, 55, then a final week at number 67. "In One Ear" and "Ain't No Rest for the Wicked" both spent 2 weeks in the top 100.

=== Weekly charts ===
Chart (2011)	Peak position
Canada Hot 100 (Billboard)	51
Canada Rock (Billboard)	1
Scotland Singles (Official Charts)	56
UK Singles (Official Charts)	55
US Billboard Hot 100	78
US Hot Rock & Alternative Songs (Billboard)	1

=== Year-end charts ===
Chart (2011)	Position
US Hot Rock Songs (Billboard)	2

== Certifications ==
Region	Certification	Certified units/sales
United States (RIAA)	Platinum	1,000,000^{‡}
^{‡} Sales+streaming figures based on certification alone.
