= Around My Head =

Single by Cage the Elephant

from the album Thank You Happy Birthday
- Released: May 4, 2011
- Length: 3:11
- Label: Jive, Relentless
- Songwriters: Jared Champion, Lincoln Parish, Brad Shultz, Matt Shultz, Daniel Tichenor
- Producer: Jay Joyce

Cage the Elephant singles chronology
"Shake Me Down" (2010)	"Around My Head" (2011)	"Aberdeen" (2011)

"Around My Head" is the second single and ninth track on American rock band Cage the Elephant's second album, Thank You Happy Birthday. The single was released globally on May 4, 2011. A music video for the single was released on June 7, 2011.

== Live performances ==
The song was performed live on 92 occasions, including Lollapalooza 2012. It has not been performed live since September 2012.

== Background and composition ==
The song starts on a soft guitar riff, over which lead singer Matthew Shultz sings a melody which matches that of the riff. The influence behind the song has been attributed to the Pixies, and Shultz has stated that he wanted his yells to "sound like Black Francis", who is the band's lead singer.

== Music video ==
A music video for the song, directed by Chris Marrs Piliero, was released on June 7, 2011. The video features the band attending a funeral for a woman. Later, at night time, lead singer Matthew Shultz, has trouble sleeping. He goes to the graveyard and digs up the woman's grave, and then takes the woman's zombie-like carcass to parties, restaurants and barbecues. His band-mates, friends and other bystanders take great amusement in the slapstick humor that ensues. Throughout the video, Shultz accidentally grills her face and loses her arm. At the end of the video, it is revealed that Shultz was dreaming. After he wakes, he actually goes to the graveyard and digs up the grave. When he presents it to his bandmates at the end of the video, however, they are disgusted; rhythm guitarist Brad Shultz vomits when he sees the carcass, and drummer Jared Champion asks Matthew Shultz "What the fuck is wrong with you, dude?" Matthew then reluctantly states that he would put her back where he found her.

== Reception ==
Reception to the single was generally mixed. Music review site AllMusic recommended the track as one of the best tracks of the album. However, writer Nikita Miller of music and photography site Hive Magazine states that "the song doesn’t seem thought about at all, basically just a quick in and out of the studio"., although she goes on to say that "it’s a fun song to listen to, in that they’ve added those “oohs” and “aahs” and used the guitars cleverly enough to convey an almost “Weezer-like” happiness in this song." Bradley Ray of The Celebrity Cafe criticized the video, saying "it fails to be shocking and it isn’t really that funny either." The song was not as commercially successful as the first single from the album, "Shake Me Down."

== Chart performance ==
=== Weekly charts ===
Chart (2011)	Peak position
Mexico Ingles Airplay (Billboard)	41
Canada Rock (Billboard)	36
US Hot Rock & Alternative Songs (Billboard)	27
US Rock & Alternative Airplay (Billboard)	27

=== Year-end charts ===
Chart (2011)	Position
US Alternative Songs (Billboard)	48

== Certifications ==
Region	Certification	Certified units/sales
United States (RIAA)	Gold	500,000^{‡}
^{‡} Sales+streaming figures based on certification alone.
