= Let's Be Still =

Studio album by The Head and the Heart
- Released: October 15, 2013
- Genres: Indie folk, indie pop, indie rock
- Label: Sub Pop

The Head and the Heart chronology
The Head and the Heart (2011)	Let's Be Still (2013)	Signs of Light (2016)

Let's Be Still is the second studio album by American band The Head and the Heart, following the 2011 release of their self-titled first album. It was officially released on October 15, 2013. Two months prior to this release, track six on the album, "Shake" was released as a single in late July 2013. The band also gave a performance of the second track, "Another Story" on Late Night with Jimmy Fallon on August 6, 2013. The band has scheduled a Fall of 2013 tour following the release of Let's Be Still.

== Track listing ==
Let's Be Still track listing
No.	Title	Length
1.	"Homecoming Heroes"	3:46
2.	"Another Story"	4:34
3.	"Springtime"	0:53
4.	"Summertime"	2:53
5.	"Josh McBride"	5:13
6.	"Shake"	4:01
7.	"Cruel"	4:59
8.	"Let's Be Still"	4:28
9.	"My Friends"	3:22
10.	"10,000 Weight in Gold"	4:12
11.	"Fire/Fear"	4:15
12.	"These Days are Numbered"	4:14
13.	"Gone"	6:26

Target exclusive bonus tracks
No.	Title	Length
14.	"Twilight"
15.	"Fire/Fear" (Live @ KEXP Seattle)
16.	"Homecoming Heroes" (Live @ KEXP Seattle)

== Personnel ==
The Head and the Heart

- Charity Rose Thielen – vocals, percussion, violin, etc.
- Josiah Johnson – vocals, guitar, percussion, etc.
- Jonathan Russell – vocals, guitar, percussion, etc.
- Tyler Williams – drums, percussion, etc.
- Chris Zasche – bass
- Kenny Hensley – keyboards, etc.

Additional musicians

- Peter Katis – additional instruments
- Kit Karlson – piano and organ on These Days Are Numbered

== Commercial performance ==
Let's Be Still debuted at number 10 with 42,000 copies sold on Billboard 200. As of July 29, 2016, it has sold 201,000 copies to date.

== Charts ==
Chart (2013)	Peak position
US Billboard 200	10
US Americana/Folk Albums (Billboard)	1
Canadian Albums (Billboard)	13
US Digital Albums (Billboard)	5
US Independent Albums (Billboard)	1

== Certifications ==
Region	Certification	Certified units/sales
United States (RIAA)	Gold	500,000^{‡}
^{‡} Sales+streaming figures based on certification alone.
