= Final Warning (Skylar Grey song) =

Single by Skylar Grey

from the album Don't Look Down
- Released: April 16, 2013
- Genre: Pop
- Length: 3:38
- Label: Kidinakorner; Interscope
- Songwriters: Holly Hafermann; Alex da Kid
- Producer: Alex da Kid

Skylar Grey singles chronology
"C'mon Let Me Ride" (2012)	"Final Warning" (2013)	"Wear Me Out" (2013)

Music video
- "Final Warning" on YouTube

"Final Warning" is a song by the American singer-songwriter Skylar Grey from her second studio album, Don't Look Down (2013). Grey wrote the song with its producer, Alex Da Kid. Kidinakorner and Interscope Records released it as the album's second single on April 16, 2013. "Final Warning" is a mid-tempo pop song, on which Grey scornfully addresses an unfaithful lover.

== Background ==
While Skylar Grey was living in a cabin in Oregon, she said that she was coming into a new version of herself. Grey said she wrote "Final Warning" in that cabin the same week she had written the chorus to "Love the Way You Lie." The song is also about the same relationship as "Love the Way You Lie".

Grey wrote the song around the same time she wrote "Love the Way You Lie" and it was originally intended for her scrapped 2012 studio album Invinsible. The song, originally titled "This Is Your Final Warning", was written in two hours.

== Critical reception ==
Sam Lansky from Idolator described the song as "a skittering midtempo ballad that’s not playful or ironic — it’s just dark" and compared its lyrics to Grey's biggest hit as a songwriter, "Love the Way You Lie".

== Track listings ==
Digital download

1. "Final Warning" - 3:41

Remix Versions

1. "Final Warning" (Faustix & Imanos Remix) - 3:22
2. "Final Warning" (MisterMike Remix featuring Thurz) - 5:10
3. "Final Warning" (featuring Corey Pieper & Nathan Allan) - 3:29

== Music video ==
On April 17, lyric video for the song was released on Grey's Vevo account. On May 13, Grey released the official musical video, which "tells the story of a mistress whose lover attempts to put her to rest for good, so he can live happily ever after with his pretty blond wife. However, Grey, who plays the other woman, resurfaces, and confronts her would-be murderer at home, in front of his family during his birthday party". The music video has over 6 million views.

== Legacy ==
Billie Eilish cited "Final Warning" as an inspiration for her song "Bellyache".

== Credits and personnel ==
Credits are adapted from the liner notes of Don't Look Down.

- Holly Hafermann – songwriter, recording
- Alex da Kid – producer, songwriter
- Jeff Ellis – recording
- J Browz – additional bass, additional guitar
- Adam Iscove – fighting
- Lourdes Iscove – fighting
- Manny Marroquin – mixing
- Joe LaPorta – mastering

== Charts ==
Chart (2013)	Peak position
Ukraine	15
