= Aperture (The Head and the Heart album) =

Studio album by the Head and the Heart
- Released: May 9, 2025
- Length: 45:08
- Label: Every Shade of Music; Verve; Universal
- Producer: The Head and the Heart

The Head and the Heart chronology
Every Shade of Blue (2022)	Aperture (2025)

Singles from Aperture
- 1. "Arrow" Released: October 17, 2024; 2. "Time With My Sins" Released: January 24, 2025; 3. "After The Setting Sun" Released: February 27, 2025; 4. "Blue Embers" Released: April 11, 2025

Aperture is the sixth studio album by American band the Head and the Heart. It was released on May 9, 2025, by the band's own label Every Shade of Music under exclusive licensing to Verve Label Group.

== Background ==
Aperture is the Head and the Heart's first studio album since Every Shade of Blue (2022) and their first to be entirely self-produced. In a press release, the band stated that the album's title was a reflection of themselves as a band and the individual band members, further adding that the album's title was also a metaphor for "represent[ing] the choice[s] we all face: to close ourselves off to the darkness or to open up and let the light in. [Aperture is] about hope, resilience, and seeing the world—and ourselves—more clearly."

== Promotion ==
The album was preceded by the release of the lead single "Arrow" on October 17, 2024 prior to the album's announcement. A music video for the song was released on October 24, 2024; WFPK featured the song as their Song of the Day the same day. The second single, "Time with My Sins", was released on January 24, 2025. The band performed the song on CBS Saturday Morning on May 10, 2025 as part of promotion for the album. The third single, "After the Setting Sun", was released on February 27, 2025 simultaneously with the album announcement. The fourth and final single, "Blue Embers", was released on April 11, 2025.

== Track listing ==
All tracks are written by Matthew Gervais, Kenny Hensley, Jonathan Russell, Charity Thielen, Tyler Williams, and Chris Zasche.

Aperture track listing
No.	Title	Length
1.	"After the Setting Sun"	4:30
2.	"Time with My Sins"	3:59
3.	"Arrow"	3:14
4.	"Beg, Steal, Borrow"	4:05
5.	"Cop Car"	3:28
6.	"Blue Embers"	3:30
7.	"Fire Escape"	3:27
8.	"Pool Break"	3:14
9.	"Jubilee"	3:05
10.	"West Coast"	3:46
11.	"Finally Free"	4:31
12.	"Aperture"	4:19
Total length:		45:08

== Personnel ==
Credits adapted from Tidal.

=== The Head and the Heart ===
- Matt Gervais – vocals, guitar, mandolin, production
- Kenny Hensley – vocals, keyboards, piano, production
- Jonathan Russell – vocals, guitar, piano, production
- Charity Rose Thielen – vocals, violin, production
- Tyler Williams – vocals, drums, percussion, production
- Chris Zasche – vocals, bass, synthesizer, production

=== Additional contributors ===
- Shawn Simmons – co-production, mixing, engineering
- Mike Reina – co-production, mixing engineering
- Greg Calbi – mastering
- Michael H. Brauer – mixing
- Nathaniel Hawkins – Pro Tools, engineering assistance
- Curtis Fye – engineering assistance
- Jon Roberts – engineering assistance
- Eric Neuser – production coordination
- Eric Van Caulil – production coordination
- Jasper Graham – creative direction, cover photo, design
- Clare Gillen – creative direction, design
- Tai Linzie – art coordination
