= C'mon Let Me Ride =

Single by Skylar Grey featuring Eminem

from the album Don't Look Down
- Released: December 11, 2012
- Genre: Synth-pop; hip hop
- Length: 3:40
- Label: Kidinakorner; Interscope
- Songwriters: Holly Hafermann; Marshall Mathers; Alexander Grant; Freddie Mercury
- Producers: Alex da Kid; Mike Del Rio; Eminem

Skylar Grey singles chronology
| "Room for Happiness" (2011) | "C'mon Let Me Ride" (2012) | "Final Warning" (2013) |

Eminem singles chronology
| "My Life" (2012) | "C'mon Let Me Ride" (2012) | "Berzerk" (2013) |

Music video
- "C'mon Let Me Ride" on YouTube

"C'mon Let Me Ride" is a song by American singer Skylar Grey, released December 11, 2012 as the first single from her major-label debut album Don't Look Down (2013). The song, produced by frequent collaborator and longtime producer Alex da Kid and Mike Del Rio, features a guest appearance from American rapper Eminem, who also mixed the record. The song was released to contemporary hit radio in January 2013.

It samples the chorus of the 1978 hit song "Bicycle Race" by the British rock band Queen.

== Music video ==
A music video was shot for the track in October in Detroit and released on December 11, 2012 on Vevo and MTV. Skylar Grey stated that she's poking fun at widespread and excessive sexualization and she also told MTV, "The video is a combined effort between director Isaac Rentz, me and Eminem, and we just wanted to make sure it was very clear that it's a sarcastic song."

There's one scene in the music video where I'm dressed up in this Red swimming suit with a pink wig, pink nails, a pink bicycle with an ice-cream cone on the back of it and it's totally girly — and not me at all. I think that's clear, because that scene happens over the bridge of the song, where I say, 'I'm only f--king with you, and f--k you for thinking it's true,' and that's when I have the pink polka-dot thing on, so it's saying, "This isn't really me".'

— Skylar Grey

The video also sponsored Dr. Dre portable speaker beats in three scenes.

== Critical response ==
AllMusic highlighted the song and wrote: "Grey is clever enough to allow herself some measure of silliness – there is absolutely no other way to describe the Queen-quoting "C'mon Let Me Ride"—a move that reveals the seams in her goth-princess persona and makes a good chunk of Don't Look Down come across as nothing more than bubblegum Lana Del Rey." HitFix wrote: "there are times when there's such a disparity between the strength of the beats vs. the strength of the lyrics that miles separate them, no more so than on "C'mon Let Me Ride," the first single that came out in December featuring Eminem. The beats are ridiculously infectious and even though the song is meant to be lightheaded, tongue-in-cheek and full of sexual innuendo, the lyrics are so inane: "I'm not like the sluts in this town/They make me blah in my mouth," it's hard to get through it without grimacing." Knoxville News Sentinel wrote: "More than anything, the Wisconsin native is bold. She made that much clear with the previously released single "C'Mon Let Me Ride," a grainy carnival of a song in which she coos endless innuendo as Eminem himself channels Pee-wee Herman singing Queen's "Bicycle Race." Glenn Gamboa of Newsday was disappointed in her emotionless delivery and he added: "The closest we get to one is playful in the oddly defiant "C'mon, Let Me Ride." New York Post wrote: "They can sound hollow, like "C'mon Let Me Ride," a silly promise of oral sex. (Eminem's surprisingly crafty guest verse is the highlight.)" Now magazine noted that the song is inane but predictable, too.

The Oakland Press called this song "goofy." Rolling Stone was mixed: "even a goofy Eminem cameo (the "Allen Iverson of safe sex") can't save "C'mon Let Me Ride" from sounding like an over-the-top hookup plea." Ted Scheinman of Slant Magazine wrote a favorable overview: "When she's having fun you can tell: "C'mon Let Me Ride," featuring Eminem, is a high-camp glory of a song, as Grey expresses her libido through the usual perverse childish metaphors and Mathers apes Freddie Mercury's "Bicycle" before dropping a zig-zagging verse that turns the beat on its head. It's the funniest fuck song of the year so far." The New York Times called this song "sarcastic flirtation." The Boston Globe was positive: "One minute she's getting silly with Eminem, who co-executive produced the set with "Lie" co-writer Alex da Kid, on the throwaway innuendo happy jam "C'mon Let Me Ride."

== Track listings and formats ==
- Digital download
1. "C'mon Let Me Ride" featuring Eminem – 3:50
- Digital download (Remixes)
1. "C'mon Let Me Ride" (Valentino Khan Remix) – 3:08
2. "C'mon Let Me Ride" (Mikael Weermets & Danny Avila's Trapstep Remix) – 4:14

== Chart performance ==
The song debuted and peaked at number 82 on the Canadian Hot 100.

== Charts ==
| Chart (2012–13) | Peak position |
|---|---|
| Belgium (Ultratip Bubbling Under Flanders) | 47 |
| Belgium (Ultratip Bubbling Under Wallonia) | 37 |
| Canada Hot 100 (Billboard) | 82 |
| Czech Republic Airplay (ČNS IFPI) | 51 |
| Ireland (IRMA) | 52 |
| New Zealand (Recorded Music NZ) | 17 |
| Poland (Polish Airplay New) | 3 |
| US Pop Airplay (Billboard) | 33 |

== Certifications ==
Certification for "C'mon Let Me Ride"
| Region | Certification | Certified units/sales |
|---|---|---|
| New Zealand (RMNZ) | Gold | 7,500^{*} |
^{*} Sales figures based on certification alone.

== Release history ==
| Country | Date | Format | Label |
|---|---|---|---|
| Canada | December 11, 2012 | Digital download | Interscope |
| France | December 11, 2012 | Digital download | Interscope |
| Germany | December 11, 2012 | Digital download | Interscope |
| United States | December 11, 2012 | Digital download | Interscope |
| United States | January 15, 2013 | Contemporary hit radio | Kidinakorner; Interscope |
