= Isaac Rentz =

Japanese-born American visual media director

- Born: August 21, 1982 (age 43); Hokkaido, Japan
- Occupations: Commercial director; film director; music video director

Isaac Rentz (born August 21, 1982) is an American feature film, music video, and commercial director.

== Biography ==
Rentz was born in Japan, and was raised in Tempe, Arizona. He was signed to Draw Pictures for UK and US music video representation until 2010. He is currently signed to Hound Content.

Rentz's work has been featured in Pitchfork Media, Spin magazine, Boards, and TV Guide. Rentz's body of work includes music videos for groups such as Katy Perry, Machine Gun Kelly, 5 Seconds of Summer, Nick Jonas, Cage The Elephant, Paramore, Tegan and Sara, Eminem and Linkin Park, as well as promotional campaigns for Nike, Jack in the Box, and The Gap.

His video for Pistol Youth's "In My Eyes" was included in the Los Angeles Film Festival's 2009 music video showcase. His video for Manchester Orchestra's "Shake It Out" was included in Spin's list of the top videos of 2009.

In 2011, Rentz directed a promotional music video for the feature film Take Me Home Tonight. The video featured actors Topher Grace, Anna Faris, and Demetri Martin reenacting iconic scenes from classic 1980s films. Huffington Post described the video as "like IMDB at a rave".

On July 20, 2011, Rentz's Cage The Elephant video for "Shake Me Down" was nominated for a 2011 MTV Video Music Award in the Best Rock Video category. On May 21, 2013, Rentz's Tegan and Sara video for "Closer" was nominated for a 2013 Much Music Video Award. In 2015, Rentz's video for "She's Kinda Hot" won an MTV video music award for Song of The Summer.

In 2015, Rentz was attached to direct Opening Night, an independent musical comedy starring Topher Grace, Taye Diggs, Anne Heche, Rob Riggle, Alona Tal, and Lauren Lapkus. It debuted at the 2016 Los Angeles Film Festival and is slated for a 2017 release.

== Music videos ==
- Portugal the Man – "AKA M80 the Wolf" (2008)
- Hot Rod Circuit – "Stateside" (2008)
- Uh Huh Her – "Not A Love Song" (2008)
- Rosie And The Gold Bug – "You've Changed" (2008)
- Great Lake Swimmers – "Pulling On A Line" (2009)
- Cage The Elephant – "Back Against The Wall" (2009)
- Fun. – "All the Pretty Girls" (2009)
- Manchester Orchestra – "Shake It Out" (2009)
- Pistol Youth – "In My Eyes" (2009)
- Cage The Elephant – "In One Ear" (2010)
- Motion City Soundtrack – "Her Words Destroyed My Planet" (2010)
- Lissie – "When I'm Alone" (2010)
- Cage the Elephant – "Shake Me Down" (2011)
- Blink 182 – "Up All Night" (2011)
- Cage The Elephant – "Aberdeen" (2011)
- Blink 182 – "After Midnight" (2012)
- The All-American Rejects – "Beekeeper's Daughter" (2012)
- MGK ft. Ester Dean – "Invincible" (2012)
- Tegan and Sara – "Closer" (2012)
- Skylar Grey ft. Eminem – "C'mon Let Me Ride" (2012)
- Chris Cornell – "The Keeper" (2013)
- Paramore – "Still Into You" (2013)
- Family of the Year – "Hero" (2013)
- Skylar Grey – "Wear Me Out" (2013)
- Cage The Elephant – "Take It or Leave It" (2014)
- A Great Big World – "Already Home" (2014)
- 5 Seconds of Summer – "Don't Stop" (2014)
- 5 Seconds of Summer – "Amnesia" (2014)
- 5 Seconds of Summer – "Good Girls" (2014)
- 5 Seconds of Summer – "She's Kinda Hot" (2015)
- Jazmine Sullivan ft. Meek Mill – "Dumb" (2015)
- 5 Seconds of Summer – "Hey Everybody!" (2015)
- Echosmith – "Let's Love" (2015)
- Walk the Moon – "Work This Body" (2016)
- 5 Seconds of Summer – "Girls Talk Boys" (2016)
- Wrabel – "11 Blocks" (2016)
- Leann Rimes – "The Story" (2016)
- Michael Buble ft. Black Thought – "Nobody But Me" (2016)
- Wrabel – "Bloodstain" (2017)
- Linkin Park ft. Pusha T & Stormzy – "Good Goodbye" (2017)
- Nick Jonas ft. Anne Marie & Mike Posner – "Remember I Told You" (2017)
- OneRepublic – "Rich Love" (2017)
- Katy Perry – "Hey Hey Hey" (2017)
- Bleachers – "Alfie's Song (Not So Typical Love Song)" (2018)
- Ava Max – "So Am I" (2019)
- Luke Bryan – "Knockin Boots" (2019)
- Freya Ridings – "Castles" (2019)
- Tiesto and Mabel – "God is a Dancer" (2019)
- Prettymuch and CNCO – "Me Necesita" (2019)
- Joywave – "Half Your Age" (2020)
- Blackbear – "Me & Ur Ghost" (2020)
- Mabel – "Boyfriend" (2020)
- Ava Max – "Kings & Queens" (2020)
- Jonas Blue ft. Max – "Naked" (2020)
- Ava Max – "Who's Laughing Now" (2020)
- A$AP Ferg ft. Nicki Minaj & MadeinTYO – "Move Ya Hips" (2020)
- Why Don't We – "Fallin' (Adrenaline)" (2020)
- Why Don't We – "Slow Down" (2020)
- Machine Gun Kelly ft. Kellin Quinn & Travis Barker – "Love Race" (2021)
- Mabel – "Let Them Know" (2021)
- OneRepublic – "Someday" (2021)
- Norah Jones – "Christmas Calling" (2021)
- Jonas Blue ft. Why Don't We – "Don't Wake Me Up" (2022)
- Shania Twain – "Waking Up Dreaming" (2022)
- David Guetta and OneRepublic – "I Don't Wanna Wait" (2024)

== Filmography ==
- Opening Night (2017)
