= Signs of Light =

Studio album by The Head and the Heart
- Released: September 9, 2016
- Genres: Indie folk; indie pop; indie rock
- Length: 49:13
- Label: Warner Bros.
- Producer: Jay Joyce

The Head and the Heart chronology
Let's Be Still (2013)	Signs of Light (2016)	Living Mirage (2019)

Singles from Signs of Light
- 1. "All We Ever Knew" Released: June 3, 2016; 2. "Rhythm & Blues" Released: 2016

Signs of Light is the third studio album by American band The Head and the Heart, and first album released through Warner Bros. Records. It was officially released on September 9, 2016. "All We Ever Knew" was released as the first single on June 3, 2016.

== Development ==
Signs of Light is The Head and the Heart's first studio album since 2013's Let's Be Still. After signing with Warner Bros. Records, the band reached out to Jay Joyce to help produce the album. The album is named after the final track of the album, "Signs of Light" which was written by Josiah Johnson, who went on hiatus from the band in March 2016.

== Release and promotion ==
Signs of Light debuted at number five on the US Billboard 200, selling 40,000 equivalent-album units in its first week, with 37,000 coming from pure album sales. This is their second consecutive top 10 album, when Let's Be Still peaked at number 10 in 2013. The album also debuted at the top spot on the Top Rock Albums chart, which ranks the week's best-selling rock albums.

=== Singles ===
On June 3, 2016, "All We Ever Knew" was released as the album's lead single and was made available for purchase and streaming. The music video released on the July 21, 2016, which was directed by Marc Klasfeld. On its seventh week, the song reached the top spot on the Billboard Adult Alternative Songs chart, the band's first since "Lost in My Mind" in 2011. Jonathan Russell told Esquire that "All We Ever Knew" was chosen as the lead single because, "it felt like a bridge between what we have been doing musically and what we're leaning towards. There are definitely songs on the record that are more examples of a direction that people haven't seen us go in. It felt like this record had a foot in the past and a foot in the future."

On September 14, 2016, they performed "All We Ever Knew" on The Late Show with Stephen Colbert. The song was also performed on the series premiere of Showtime's Roadies.

== Track listing ==
Signs of Light track listing
No.	Title	Length
1.	"All We Ever Knew"	3:46
2.	"City of Angels"	3:57
3.	"Rhythm & Blues"	4:00
4.	"False Alarm"	4:08
5.	"Dreamer"	3:13
6.	"Library Magic"	3:14
7.	"Turn It Around"	3:43
8.	"Colors"	4:12
9.	"Take a Walk"	3:41
10.	"Oh My Dear"	2:26
11.	"I Don't Mind"	2:34
12.	"Your Mother's Eyes"	4:10
13.	"Signs of Light"	6:09
Total length:		49:13

Japanese bonus track
No.	Title	Length
14.	"Wandering Albatross"

== Charts ==
=== Weekly charts ===
Chart (2016)	Peak position
Canadian Albums (Billboard)	26
US Billboard 200	5
US Top Rock Albums (Billboard)	1

=== Year-end charts ===
Chart (2016)	Position
US Top Rock Albums (Billboard)	52
