= Don't Look Down (Skylar Grey album) =

2013 studio album by Skylar Grey

Studio album by Skylar Grey
- Released: July 5, 2013
- Genres: Pop; hip-hop
- Length: 45:30
- Labels: Kidinakorner; Interscope
- Producers: Alex da Kid; Holly Hafermann; Mike Del Rio; Jayson DeZuzio; Illfactor; J.R. Rotem

Skylar Grey chronology
Like Blood Like Honey (2006)	Don't Look Down (2013)	Natural Causes (2016)

Singles from Don't Look Down
- 1. "C'mon Let Me Ride" Released: December 11, 2012; 2. "Final Warning" Released: April 16, 2013; 3. "Wear Me Out" Released: June 4, 2013; 4. "White Suburban" Released: July 2, 2013

Don't Look Down is the second studio album by American singer-songwriter Skylar Grey. Kidinakorner and Interscope Records released the album on July 5, 2013. Grey worked with producers including J. R. Rotem, Alex da Kid, Jayson DeZuzio, and Mike Del Rio. Featured artists include Big Sean, Travis Barker, Eminem, and Angel Haze. A pop album with hip-hop influences, it is a departure from Grey's previous musical output as Holly Brook.

== Background ==
Don't Look Down was scheduled to be released in the fall of 2011, under the title Invinsible, a portmanteau of "invisible" and "invincible", an idea which was given to her by American musician Marilyn Manson. Grey had said that the album would be a complete departure from any of her previous work, stating in interviews with Los Angeles Times and Rap-Up, that the album's sound is "...commercial, yet avant-garde...", with "...cinematic beats and atmospheric hooks...", and "...sonically I can tell you that every song sounds different and it's really diverse, kind of going from cinematic to fun to dark. Alex and I really push each other creatively...". In an October 2012 interview with Rolling Stone, Grey re-titled the album to its current namesake and announced that American rapper Eminem, would executive produce the album. She also said she had been working with J. R. Rotem.

== Promotion and singles ==
The album's lead single, "C'mon Let Me Ride" was released on December 11, 2012, and features rapper Eminem. The official music video for the single was released on VEVO the same day. The song peaked at #33 on Pop Songs in the United States. In the meanwhile, Grey released "Final Warning" on April 16, 2013; it was the album's second single. The official music video was released on May 14, 2013. On June 4, 2013, "Wear Me Out" was premiered online. The music video was released a week later. On the US iTunes Store during the week of release, the album's title song "Tower (Don't Look Down)" was featured as "single of the week"; it was released as a promotional single for free. "White Suburban" is the fourth song from the album to receive the music video treatment. The video premiered on July 3, 2013. In August, Grey confirmed that she had filmed a music video for "Back from the Dead" featuring Big Sean and Travis Barker.

== Critical reception ==
Professional ratings
Aggregate scores
Source	Rating
Metacritic	58/100
Review scores
Source	Rating
Allmusic	2.5/5 stars
HitFix	B−
Knoxville News Sentinel	3.5/5 stars
Newsday	B−
New York Post	2.5/4 stars
Now	2/5 stars
The Oakland Press	2.5/4 stars
Rolling Stone	2.5/5 stars
Slant Magazine	3/5 stars
USA Today	2.5/4 stars

Don't Look Down garnered generally mixed reception from music critics. At Metacritic, they assign a weighted score to ratings and reviews from selected music critics, and the album has a Metascore of 58, which is based upon six reviews. This means it has been given "mixed or average" reception. At The New York Times, Jon Pareles gave it a positive review, and affirmed that "angst, melody and a hip-hop backbone are a promising combination." Sarah Rodman of The Boston Globe gave a positive review, and stated "if the music gods smile favorably upon her, Grey will soon be known as a solo artist in her own right, thanks to the gifts for melody and turning a phrase displayed on this captivating debut under her current nom de pop."

At Knoxville News Sentinel, Chuck Campbell feels the release "may not clearly define who Grey is, but it's fitfully gutsy." Melinda Newman of HitFix told the album "sounds like Grey made the album she wanted to: one that shows her many different sides: lover, fighter, muse... but your appreciation for it will depend upon your tolerance for the often misplaced reliance on beats." At Newsday, Glenn Gamboa alluded to how the listener will "keep waiting for her to show some emotion -- any emotion." At New York Post, Michaelangelo Matos affirmed while "the occasional misfire aside, the R&B-leaning pop rocker knows how to write a hook". Gary Graff of The Oakland Press stated that this is a "somewhat messy 12-song set that seems to pit what Grey wants to be — or thinks she should — against her natural creative leanings." At USA Today, Elysa Gardner told that Grey "has successfully collaborated [with] other artists", but without her collaborators, Grey "conveys less a personality than a variety of poses evoking clichés reinforced by her accessible but unremarkable hip-hop-fueled pop." But, Ted Scheinan of Slant Magazine was against this notion, when he wrote that in "complicating matters further, executive producer Eminem allows far too many cooks in the kitchen, a reflexive inclusivity that leaves the album feeling over-processed."

Scheinan of Slant Magazine feels "Don't Look Down is the sound of an artist negotiating with her own MC impulses, of a talented lyricist whose pop instincts tell her to abridge herself." In addition, Scheinan noted "at heart, Don't Look Down is a vaguely hip-hop-inflected homage to '90s pop, not so much uninteresting as underwhelming and repetitive in its orchestration." At Allmusic, Stephen Thomas Erlewine said the release "come[s] across as nothing more than bubblegum Lana Del Rey." Will Hermes at Rolling Stone called "Final Warning" mere "tabloid fodder and "C'mon Let Me Ride" sounds "like an over-the-top hookup plea", however he wrote "you've gotta love a pop star who titles a song about unplanned pregnancy 'Shit, Man!'" In concluding, Hermes noted the "stirring 'White Suburban' suggests Grey might, in the end, make a more convincing good girl." At Now, Tabassum Siddiqui feels "given Grey's connection to music's biggest headline-makers, it's ironic that her own output isn't all that memorable.". Mark Grondin from Spectrum Pulse gave it a 5/10 said that she struggled to come out from Eminem's shadow and struggled to match the production. And that the album was bland.

It was placed at No. 79 on Amazon's Best Albums of 2013 list.

== Commercial performance ==
In its first week of release Don't Look Down debuted at number 8 on the Billboard 200, selling 24,000 copies in the United States. The album has sold 62,000 copies in the United States as of August 2016.

== Track listings ==
Don't Look Down – Digital / CD Standard edition (Catalog #602537424795)
No.	Title	Writer(s)	Producer(s)	Length
1.	"Back from the Dead" (featuring Big Sean and Travis Barker)	Holly Hafermann; J.R. Rotem; Ross Golan; Sean Anderson; Barker	J.R. Rotem; Golan^{[a]}	4:23
2.	"Final Warning"	Hafermann; Alexander Grant	Alex da Kid	3:40
3.	"Wear Me Out"	Hafermann; Rotem	Rotem	3:30
4.	"Religion"	Hafermann; Rotem; Ivan Corraliza	Rotem; Illfactor^{[a]}	3:09
5.	"C'mon Let Me Ride" (featuring Eminem)	Hafermann; Grant; Mike Del Rio; Marshall Mathers; Freddie Mercury	Alex da Kid	3:38
6.	"Sunshine"	Hafermann; Grant; Jayson DeZuzio	Alex da Kid; DeZuzio; Hafermann^{[a]}	3:46
7.	"Pulse"	Hafermann; Rotem; DeZuzio	Rotem; Hafermann^{[a]}; DeZuzio^{[a]}	3:39
8.	"Glow in the Dark"	Hafermann; Grant; Del Rio	Alex da Kid; Del Rio	3:44
9.	"Shit, Man!" (featuring Angel Haze)	Hafermann; Grant; DeZuzio; Raykeea Wilson	Alex da Kid; Dezuzio	3:27
10.	"Clear Blue Sky"	Hafermann; Grant; Lauren Christy; Clare Maguire	Alex da Kid	3:49
11.	"Tower (Don't Look Down)"	Hafermann; Grant	Alex da Kid	4:02
12.	"White Suburban"	Hafermann	Hafermann	4:43

Don't Look Down – iTunes version
No.	Title	Writer(s)	Producer(s)	Length
1.	"Back from the Dead" (featuring Big Sean and Travis Barker)	Holly Hafermann; Jonathan Rotem; Ross Golan; Sean Anderson; Barker	J.R. Rotem; Golan^{[a]}	4:23
2.	"Final Warning"	Hafermann; Alexander Grant	Alex da Kid	3:40
3.	"Wear Me Out"	Hafermann; Rotem	Rotem	3:30
4.	"Religion"	Hafermann; Rotem; Ivan Corraliza	Rotem; Illfactor^{[a]}	3:09
5.	"C'mon Let Me Ride" (featuring Eminem)	Hafermann; Grant; Mike Del Rio; Marshall Mathers; Freddie Mercury	Alex da Kid	3:38
6.	"Love the Way You Lie Part III" (Original demo bonus track)	Hafermann; Grant; Mathers	Hafermann	4:11
7.	"Sunshine"	Hafermann; Grant; Jayson DeZuzio	Alex da Kid; DeZuzio; Hafermann^{[a]}	3:46
8.	"Pulse"	Hafermann; Rotem; DeZuzio	Rotem; Hafermann^{[a]}; DeZuzio^{[a]}	3:39
9.	"Glow in the Dark"	Hafermann; Grant; Del Rio	Alex da Kid; Del Rio	3:44
10.	"Shit, Man!" (featuring Angel Haze)	Hafermann; Grant; DeZuzio; Raykeea Wilson	Alex da Kid; Dezuzio	3:27
11.	"Clear Blue Sky"	Hafermann; Grant; Lauren Christy; Clare Maguire	Alex da Kid	3:49
12.	"Tower (Don't Look Down)"	Hafermann; Grant	Alex da Kid	4:02
13.	"Ticking Time Bomb" (bonus track)	Hafermann; Grant	Alex da Kid	4:14
14.	"White Suburban"	Hafermann	Hafermann	4:43
15.	"Coming Home, Pt. II" (bonus track)	Hafermann	Hafermann	2:44
Total length:				53:59

Don't Look Down – Spotify edition
No.	Title	Writer(s)	Producer(s)	Length
1.	"Back from the Dead" (featuring Big Sean and Travis Barker)			4:22
2.	"Final Warning"			3:40
3.	"Wear Me Out"			3:28
4.	"Religion"			3:08
5.	"C'mon Let Me Ride" (featuring Eminem)			3:38
6.	"Only Thing I Hear" (featuring Travis Barker)	Hafermann; Grant; Barker	Alex da Kid	3:21
7.	"Sunshine"			3:45
8.	"Pulse"			3:38
9.	"Glow in the Dark"			3:44
10.	"Shit, Man!" (featuring Angel Haze)			3:25
11.	"Clear Blue Sky"			3:49
12.	"Tower (Don't Look Down)"			4:00
13.	"White Suburban"			4:41
Total length:				48:39

Don't Look Down – Target exclusive edition
No.	Title	Writer(s)	Producer(s)	Length
1.	"Back from the Dead" (featuring Big Sean and Travis Barker)			4:22
2.	"Final Warning"			3:40
3.	"Wear Me Out"			3:28
4.	"Religion"			3:08
5.	"C'mon Let Me Ride" (featuring Eminem)			3:38
6.	"Weirdo"	Hafermann; Grant	Alex da Kid	2:37
7.	"Sunshine"			3:45
8.	"Pulse"			3:38
9.	"Glow in the Dark"			3:44
10.	"Beautiful Nightmare"	Hafermann; Grant	Alex da Kid	3:29
11.	"Shit, Man!" (featuring Angel Haze)			3:25
12.	"Clear Blue Sky"			3:49
13.	"Tower (Don't Look Down)"			4:00
14.	"White Suburban"			4:41
Total length:				51:24

Notes

- ^[a] denotes co-producer
- "C'mon Let Me Ride" contains portions of "Bicycle Race", written by Freddie Mercury.

== Personnel ==
Musicians

- Skylar Grey – vocals

Additional musicians

- Travis Barker – drums (track 1)
- Big Sean – vocals (track 1)
- Eminem – vocals (track 5)
- Angel Haze – vocals (track 10)

Additional personnel

- Alex da Kid – executive producer
- Eminem – executive producer
- Mike Del Rio - Producer (Tracks 5, 9)
- Jayson DeZuzio – producer (tracks 7, 9 and 10), co-producer (track 8)
- Ross Golan – co-producer (track 1)
- Skylar Grey – producer (track 10), co-producer (tracks 6–8)
- Ill Factor – co-producer (track 4)
- J.R. Rotem – producer (tracks 1, 3, 4 and 8)

== Charts ==
Weekly chart performance for Don't Look Down
Chart (2013)	Peak position
Canadian Albums (Billboard)	25
US Billboard 200	8

== Release history ==
Region	Date	Format	Label
Belgium	July 5, 2013	Digital download	Universal Music
Italy	July 5, 2013	Digital download	Universal Music
Netherlands	July 5, 2013	Digital download	Universal Music
Spain	July 5, 2013	Digital download	Universal Music
United Kingdom	July 8, 2013	Digital download	Interscope Records
Canada	July 9, 2013	Digital download	CD
United States	July 9, 2013	CD, digital download	KidinaKorner, Interscope
United States	July 10, 2013	CD + autographed Snapback	KidinaKorner, Interscope
Australia	July 12, 2013	CD	Universal Music

== iTunes Session ==
iTunes Session

EP by Skylar Grey
- Released: October 15, 2013
- Recorded: 2013
- Genre: Acoustic pop
- Labels: KIDinaKORNER; Interscope

Skylar Grey chronology
Don't Look Down (2013)	iTunes Session (2013)

iTunes Session is the fifth extended play by American singer-songwriter Skylar Grey. It contains nine songs. The EP was released exclusively to the iTunes store on October 15, 2013.

=== Track listing ===
No.	Title	Writer(s)	Length
1.	"Back from the Dead (iTunes Session)"	Holly Hafermann; J.R. Rotem; Ross Golan; Sean Anderson; Travis Barker	3:43
2.	"Wear Me Out (iTunes Session)"	Hafermann; Rotem	3:28
3.	"Room for Happiness (iTunes Session)"	Hafermann	3:49
4.	"All I Want (iTunes Session)"	Joni Mitchell	3:45
5.	"C'mon Let Me Ride"	Hafermann; Grant; Mike Del Rio; Marshall Mathers; Freddie Mercury	3:02
6.	"Sunshine (iTunes Session)"	Hafermann; Grant; Jayson DeZuzio	3:19
7.	"White Suburban (iTunes Session)"	Hafermann	4:25
8.	"S**t, Man! (iTunes Session)"	Hafermann; Grant; DeZuzio; Raykeea Wilson	2:22
9.	"Love the Way You Lie (iTunes Session)"	Hafermann; Grant; Mathers	4:19
