= Every Shade of Blue (album) =

Studio album by The Head and the Heart
- Released: April 29, 2022
- Length: 58:42
- Label: Warner; Reprise
- Producer: Jesse Shatkin; John Hill; Sammy Witte; Andrew Sarlo; Matt Gervais

The Head and the Heart chronology
Living Mirage (2019)	Every Shade of Blue (2022)	Aperture (2025)

Singles from Every Shade of Blue
- 1. "Every Shade of Blue" Released: January 21, 2022; 2. "Virginia (Wind in the Night)" Released: February 11, 2022; 3. "Tiebreaker" Released: March 25, 2022

Every Shade of Blue is the fifth studio album by American band The Head and the Heart. It was released on April 29, 2022, by Warner Records and Reprise Records.

== Background ==
On January 21, 2022, the Head and the Heart announced details about the album, revealing its title Every Shade of Blue and its release date of April 29, 2022. In a press release, the band stated that the album "conveys a spectrum of emotions and how we live with them", while further adding that "The closer we get the more shades we see. The more shades we see the more responsibility we hold. We all want to feel loved and protected. The question is will we be supported and seen by the ones we love in every shade of blue."

== Singles ==
The album's title track was released simultaneously with the album announcement on January 21, 2022, accompanied by a music video which was filmed primarily underwater. The second single from the album, "Virginia (Wind in the Night)" was released on February 11, 2022. Of the song, vocalist Jonathan Russell said that it "represents a long and winding relationship to place — a place that is grounding", while further elaborating that his reflection of life through symbolism is "part of my search for a deeper connection without having to compare our experiences directly." The third single "Tiebreaker" was released on March 25, 2022.

== Critical reception ==
Upon release, Every Shade of Blue was met with mixed reviews from critics. At Metacritic, which assigns a normalized rating out of 100 based on reviews from mainstream publications, the album received a score of 60 based on four reviews, indicating "mixed or average reviews". Clash Music was mixed in their reception of the album, writing that the album's production at various points were overshadowed by "an overabundance of sonic elements" and questioned whether all of the 16 songs merited inclusion on the record despite calling the album's runtime "an impressive feat that nods towards [The Head and the Heart's] prolificism". Mary Siroky of Consequence criticized the album's lack of cohesiveness, specifically highlighting songs "Family Man" and "GTFU", and concluding that the album as a whole had nothing new to add to the "specific strain of indie-pop" that has been pioneered by similar artists and bands of the genre. Anthony Mark Happel of Under the Radar expressed similar sentiments, writing: "There is a ghostly sonic aspect to this album that does stay with you after the fact, with every song here being the sound of a certain "shade of blue," and there is always an intimacy and an emotional immediacy to what they do as a band, but more often than not it stays too much in that one place, their comfort zone. It causes an album like this to come across like a collection of demo tracks by a very accomplished band that lays out their aural plan, but doesn't ever fully color in all of the spaces available to them. It doesn't evolve into what it could be."

== Track listing ==
Every Shade of Blue track listing
No.	Title	Length
1.	"Every Shade of Blue"	3:33
2.	"Tiebreaker"	3:59
3.	"Paradigm"	3:24
4.	"Virginia (Wind in the Night)"	3:25
5.	"Same Hurt"	3:44
6.	"Hurts (But It Goes Away)"	3:15
7.	"Don't Show Your Weakness"	3:54
8.	"Love We Make"	4:30
9.	"Starstruck"	2:51
10.	"Love Me Still"	2:33
11.	"Shut Up"	3:30
12.	"Family Man"	3:50
13.	"Taking My Time (Wrong Woman)"	2:53
14.	"Enemy Lines"	3:23
15.	"Shadows"	4:38
16.	"GTFU"	4:20

== Chart performance ==
Chart (2022)	Peak position
US Folk Albums (Billboard)	21
