= Thank You, Happy Birthday =

Thank You Happy Birthday

Studio album by Cage the Elephant
- Released: January 11, 2011
- Recorded: Tragedy Studios, Nashville, Tennessee 2009–2010
- Genres: Alternative rock; garage rock; indie rock; noise rock; post-hardcore
- Length: 45:20
- Labels: Jive (US); Universal (Canada); Relentless (UK)
- Producer: Jay Joyce

Cage the Elephant chronology
Cage the Elephant (2008)	Thank You Happy Birthday (2011)	Melophobia (2013)

Singles from Thank You Happy Birthday
- 1. "Shake Me Down" Released: November 22, 2010; 2. "Around My Head" Released: May 4, 2011; 3. "Aberdeen" Released: September 15, 2011; 4. "Always Something" Released: September 11, 2011

Thank You, Happy Birthday is the second studio album by American rock band Cage the Elephant. It was released on January 11, 2011 to positive critical reception. The album was produced by Jay Joyce, who also produced the band's eponymous debut album.

The album debuted at number 2 on the Billboard 200.. It sold over 39,000 copies in the US in its first week of release, making it the band’s highest charting effort to date.

The band released three singles from the album. "Shake Me Down" reached number 78 on the Billboard Hot 100. " Around My Head" went to number 27 and " Aberdeen" peaked at number 22 on the magazine's Hot Rock chart. Album track, "Always Something" reached number 39 on Billboard's Alternative Airplay chart, as well.

== Recording and production ==
The album was originally announced in July 2009 when the band had stated that they would release it in early 2010 with the title Computer Says Move. The group had recorded over eighty songs but shelved all of them when they realized that "nobody was really into" any of the ideas. The group then took ideas that they had saved for "side projects" and decided to use those songs for the album, which was then given the current title. The band once again worked with Jay Joyce, who had helped them record their first album. The band had trouble recording the songs, with lead singer Matt Shultz, in particular, having trouble finding the inspiration to write the lyrics for songs such as "Flow." The group was able to work out twelve songs for the album, stating: "We want each of our songs to sound like it's been written by a different band."

== Music ==
The album also took a more experimental approach. Some songs were even angrier than their first album. The Tampa Bay Times wrote “Thank You Happy Birthday, goes insane. Like a bipolar schizophrenic, the album is constantly changing.”

Guitarist Brad Shultz, cited guitar duo Santo & Johnny to R&B vocal group the Coasters as key influences on the album. Many of the records clouds of backward guitar noise were created with a Boomerang III Phrase Sampler pedal.

The album lyrics touched upon not selling out as seen in tracks like "Sell Yourself" and "Shake Me Down". This attitude largely lent to the songs' poignant sound and connected them with an audience that is more concerned with principle than catchiness. Also touching upon inner turmoil, identity along with critiquing materialism and fame.

== Singles ==
The first single, titled "Shake Me Down", was released on November 22, 2010, and was announced by the band via their Twitter account as being played on radio stations from November 17 onward. Also on November 17, they released an unofficial video for the song. On January 11, 2011, the official video was released. For the week of February 25 through March 5, 2011, the single was number 1 on Billboard Rock Songs chart. In the week of January 11 the band was named the MTV PUSH artist of the week. The song also cracked the Billboard Hot 100 peaking at number 78, which is the highest any of their songs has charted.

On the November 18, 2010, "2024" was made a free download on Filter magazine's website.

On December 27, 2010, "Around My Head" was released as the free song of the week on iTunes. The song was later released as an official single on 4 May 2011. In the week of 6 July 2011, the single charted at number 18 on Billboard Alternative Songs.

The second track on the album, "Aberdeen" was released as a single on September 15, 2011. The songs music video was later released which was made completely out of clay animation which followed a clumsy, lonely dragon-like monster.

== Release ==
The album was released on January 11, 2011, and on its first day debuted at number 1 on the iTunes Top Downloads chart. That same night, the group appeared on the Late Show with David Letterman. During its first week of release, the album sold over 39,000 copies in the US, debuting at number 2 on the Billboard 200. The album also peaked at number 2 on U.S Top Rock Albums, Top Alternative Albums and Independent Albums. Internationally the album is their highest charting on the Billboard Canadian Album peaking at number 7, additionally it reached number 26 on the UK Albums Chart.

On 27 January 2011 the band promoted the album even further, performing "Shake Me Down" and "Aberdeen" on Jimmy Kimmel Live! for the Jimmy Kimmel Live! Concert Series on ABC. Shortly after this, the group performed "Shake Me Down" on Fuel TV program The Daily Habit. The album was released in the UK on March 21, 2011.

On November 17, 2023, a vinyl version of the album was released, included in the package was a 7-inch single of the acoustic version of "Right Before My Eyes", simply titled "Shiver", due to the original working title being "Timber Me Shivers".

== Reception ==
Professional ratings
Aggregate scores
Source	Rating
Metacritic	76/100
Review scores
Source	Rating
AllMusic	3.5/5 stars
Consequence of Sound	C−
The Music Cycle	link
Rolling Stone	3.5/5 stars
The Guardian	4/5 stars
Popmatters	6/10 stars
RockFreaks.net	7/10 stars
Ultimate Guitar	9/10
Sputnikmusic	4/5

The reception for the album has been generally positive. Metacritic, which assigns a normalized rating out of 100, currently gives it a score of 76/100 based on twenty-two critics' reviews. Alternative Press stated that the record was "an alarmingly good album." Jon Pareles of The New York Times added that "the new album is more abrasive, rowdier, more unstable and pushier in the right ways," going on to say that when the album is "[p]layed quietly, like a Beatles ballad, it's brave enough to set bravado aside." Jody Rosen of Rolling Stone said of lead singer Matt Shultz: "Shultz coos, 'All I got is nothing but a little bit of love.' He's got another thing, actually: one of rock's best young bands."

Betty Clark writing for The Guardian wrote “layering exhilarating darkness and sinister sweetness, and some of the catchiest melodies you'll hear all year.” adding “Derivative? Absolutely, but brilliant nonetheless.” Guitar World wrote that the album "is a nonstop sonic joyride through jungles of wild guitar tones. An air of mystery pervades the disc. Guitars materialize out of nowhere, then vaporize into oblivion. Blasts of alt-rock grunge give way to passages of reverberating film-noir Duane Eddy twang." A reviewer for Ultimate Guitar commented on the albums change in sound stating "The profound difference in style from their previous album will leave many listeners unsatisfied. However, I found it refreshing that the band sort of felt like "Been there, done that," and moved on to a new idea."

== Legacy ==
Matt Shultz would later look back on the album five years after the release of "Shake Me Down", in an interview with Alternative Nation. He said, "There are definitely some times where I look back and wish I had let more of myself into the album. Earlier in my life, I had so much stock in the persona, and believed too much in 'the character' in the realm of pop and rock music, whatever pedal you want to put on it. The modern... whatever. It's part of the story, and it is what it was."

== Track listing ==
No.	Title	Length
1.	"Always Something"	3:41
2.	"Aberdeen"	3:12
3.	"Indy Kidz"	5:02
4.	"Shake Me Down"	3:31
5.	"2024"	3:10
6.	"Sell Yourself"	2:11
7.	"Rubber Ball"	3:47
8.	"Right Before My Eyes"	3:14
9.	"Around My Head"	3:11
10.	"Sabertooth Tiger"	2:51
11.	"Japanese Buffalo"	3:03
12.	"Flow"	3:27
13.	"Right Before My Eyes (alternate take)" (Hidden track)	3:56
Total length:		45:20

=== Acoustic Bonus Disc ===
No.	Title	Length
14.	"Aberdeen (Acoustic)"	3:11
15.	"2024 (Acoustic)"	3:12
16.	"Around My Head (Acoustic)"	3:14
17.	"Shake Me Down (Acoustic)"	3:38
18.	"Right Before My Eyes (Acoustic)"	3:28

=== B-Sides ===
No.	Title	Length
1.	"Carry Me In"	5:58
2.	"Doctor Doctor Doctor, Help Me Help Me Help Me"	2:14
3.	"Shiver"	3:56

== Personnel ==
=== Cage the Elephant ===
- Matt Shultz – lead vocals
- Brad Shultz – rhythm guitar
- Jared Champion – drums
- Daniel Tichenor – bass guitar, backing vocals
- Lincoln Parish – lead guitar

=== Technical personnel ===
- Andrew Schubert — mixing
- Brad Townsend — mixing
- Chris Lord-Alge — mixing
- Howie Weinberg — mastering
- Jason Hall — engineer
- Jay Joyce — producer
- Keith Armstrong — mixing assistant
- Nik Karpen — mixing assistant
- Matt Wheeler — assistant engineer
- Meghan Foley — art direction
- R. Clint Colburn — illustrations and logo
- Sandy Kim — Photography

== Charts ==
Charts	Peak Position
US Billboard 200	2
US Top Rock Albums (Billboard)	2
US Top Alternative Albums (Billboard)	2
Billboard Canadian Albums	7
US Independent Albums (Billboard)	2
UK Albums Chart	26
UK Album Downloads Chart	13
UK Physical Albums	36
Scottish Singles and Albums Charts	31

== Certifications ==
Region	Certification	Certified units/sales
United States (RIAA)	Gold	500,000^{‡}
^{‡} Sales+streaming figures based on certification alone.
