= The Head and the Heart (album) =

Studio album by The Head and the Heart
- Released: April 19, 2011
- Genres: Americana; chamber pop; orchestral pop; folk rock; indie folk
- Length: 39:26
- Label: Sub Pop

The Head and the Heart chronology
The Head and the Heart (2011)	Let's Be Still (2013)

Professional ratings
Review scores
Source	Rating
AllMusic	4/5 stars
Pitchfork	3.8/10
The Guardian	2/5 stars

The Head and the Heart is the debut studio album by folk rock band The Head and the Heart, released on April 19, 2011, on Sub Pop. A deluxe edition of the album was released in August 2011 and included "Chasing A Ghost" (live), "Josh McBride" (Live), and "Rivers and Roads" (live).

Initially, the band had self-released the album in June 2009, selling it at concerts, by word of mouth, and through local record stores. In the ensuing months the album sold 10,000 copies. Their music plays heavily on the trio of vocal harmonies, piano and violin melodies, and prominent drums and percussion. It was the top-selling album of the year 2010 for the independent Sonic Boom Records in the band's home neighborhood of Ballard, Seattle.

The song "Rivers and Roads" was used in the series finale of NBC's Chuck, in the 16th episode of the seventh season of CBS's comedy How I Met Your Mother, 19th episode of the season finale of Netflix's Manifest, at the season finale of the fourth season of Fox's series New Girl, and in The Good Doctor.

== Track listing ==
All songs by Josiah Johnson, Jon Russell, Charity Thielen, Kenny Hensley, Chris Zasche, and Tyler Williams.

The Head and the Heart track listing
No.	Title	Length
1.	"Cats and Dogs"	1:55
2.	"Coeur D'Alene"	4:21
3.	"Ghosts"	4:18
4.	"Down in the Valley"	5:03
5.	"Rivers and Roads"	4:44
6.	"Honey Come Home"	3:21
7.	"Lost in My Mind"	4:19
8.	"Winter Song"	2:43
9.	"Sounds Like Hallelujah"	3:10
10.	"Heaven Go Easy on Me"	5:40

== Personnel ==
- Charity Rose Thielen – vocals, violin, percussion
- Josiah Johnson – vocals, guitar, percussion
- Jonathan Russell – vocals, guitar, percussion
- Tyler Williams – drums, percussion, vocals
- Chris Zasche – bass, vocals
- Kenny Hensley – piano, vocals
- Chelsey Duff, Colin Isler, Kevin Matley, Yakup Trana – Additional Instrumentation
- Steven James Aguilar – producer, recorded by, mixed by
- Shawn Simmons – producer, recorded by
- Kevin Matley – producer

== Commercial performance ==
The Head and the Heart peaked at number 109 with 4,000 copies sold on Billboard 200.

== Charts ==
Chart (2011–12)	Peak position
U.S. Billboard 200	109
U.S. Billboard Folk Albums	3
U.S. Billboard Rock Albums	23
U.S. Billboard Alternative Albums	18
U.S. Billboard Independent Albums	14

== Certifications ==
Region	Certification	Certified units/sales
Canada (Music Canada)	Gold	40,000^{‡}
United States (RIAA)	Platinum	1,000,000^{‡}
^{‡} Sales+streaming figures based on certification alone.
