= Cage the Elephant (album) =

Studio album by Cage the Elephant
- Released: 23 June 2008
- Genres: Punk blues; alternative rock; garage rock; indie rock
- Length: 37:47
- Labels: Jive (US); Universal (Canada); Relentless (UK)
- Producer: Jay Joyce

Cage the Elephant chronology
Perfect Confusion (2005)	Cage the Elephant (2008)	Thank You, Happy Birthday (2011)

Singles from Cage the Elephant
- 1. "Free Love" Released: 2008; 2. "In One Ear" Released: 17 March 2008; 3. "Ain't No Rest for the Wicked" Released: 16 June 2008; 4. "Back Against the Wall" Released: 27 July 2009

Cage the Elephant is the debut studio album by American rock band Cage the Elephant. The album was produced by Jay Joyce and released on 23 June 2008, in Europe by Relentless Records, and on 24 March 2009, in the United States by RCA/Jive Label Group. It was certified platinum by the RIAA and spawned four singles.

== Background and music ==
In 2006, after the band had played extensively in their local scene in Bowling Green they signed with Relentless Records, and relocated to London where they recorded their first album, seeking a broader audience in the UK’s indie rock market. The album was recorded in a very short period of time with producer Jay Joyce later noting that it was "very live and done very quickly.”

The album featured a garage rock sound with gritty guitar riffs and loose, energetic rhythms. The album also featured some elements of blues as well. The lyrics touch upon rebellion, individuality, and morality, along with a search for meaning and authenticity, while also taking shots at the music industry.

== Chart performance ==
Cage the Elephant debuted on the UK Albums Chart at number 38 in its week of release, and debuted at number 171 on the Billboard 200, later rising to number 67. On the release of the band's second album, Thank You, Happy Birthday, Cage the Elephant reappeared on the Billboard 200, this time reaching number 59. It also peaked at number 69 on the Billboard Canadian Albums.

== Singles ==
The first and second singles from the album, "Free Love" and "In One Ear", did not make significant impact on any charts. However, the third single "Ain't No Rest for the Wicked" (from its original 2008 release) reached number 32 on the UK Singles Chart, and a later 2009 US release reached number 3 on the Alternative Songs chart, number 8 on the Mainstream Rock Tracks chart, and number 83 on the Billboard Hot 100 pop chart. Although it was their most successful and most popular single to date, it did not reach number one on the Alternative Songs chart like "In One Ear" and "Back Against the Wall", but it actually had more airplay on alternative rock radio stations than the other two and it was also the most played Cage the Elephant song on the radio. It was also used in numerous television spots, becoming their most popular single so far. "Back Against the Wall" was the fourth single from the album and reached number one on the Billboard Alternative Songs chart, number 26 on the Mainstream Rock Tracks chart, and number 12 on the Rock Songs chart. The song "Ain't No Rest for the Wicked" was used in the opening cutscene to the video game Borderlands.

== Reception ==
Professional ratings
Aggregate scores
Source	Rating
Metacritic	64/100
Review scores
Source	Rating
AllMusic	4/5 stars
BBC Music	(favorable)
The Fly	3.5/5 stars
NME	(7/10)
Rolling Stone	3/5 stars

The album was met with positive reviews. Alex Henderson writing for AllMusic stated that “there are major parallels between Cage the Elephant's influences even though their influences come from different eras. But instead of trying to sound exactly like those influences, Cage the Elephant have developed their own sound -- a sound that is hardly groundbreaking by 2000s standards, but is nonetheless their own sound. And they show considerable promise on this excellent album.” Susie Goldring writing for BBC Music simply stated “If you want to release some good time rock 'n' roll, listen to this album.”

== Track listing ==
All tracks are written by Cage the Elephant.

No.	Title	Length
1.	"In One Ear"	4:01
2.	"James Brown"	3:20
3.	"Ain't No Rest for the Wicked"	2:55
4.	"Tiny Little Robots"	4:10
5.	"Lotus"	3:16
6.	"Back Against the Wall"	3:48
7.	"Drones in the Valley"	2:27
8.	"Judas"	3:26
9.	"Back Stabbin' Betty"	3:39
10.	"Soil to the Sun"	3:17
11.	"Free Love"	3:28
Total length:		37:47

CagetheElephant.com bonus track
No.	Title	Length
12.	"Cover Me Again"	3:15

== Personnel ==
=== Cage the Elephant ===
- Matt Shultz – lead vocals
- Brad Shultz – rhythm guitar
- Jared Champion – drums
- Daniel Tichenor – bass guitar, backing vocals
- Lincoln Parish – lead guitar

=== Technical personnel ===
- Jay Joyce – producer
- Jason Hall – engineer
- Howie Weinberg – mastering

== Charts ==
=== Weekly charts ===
Chart (2008–2011)	Peak position
Scottish Albums (Official Charts)	60
UK Albums (Official Charts)	38
US Top Hard Rock Albums (Billboard)	6
US Billboard 200	59
US Independent Albums (Billboard)	7
US Top Alternative Albums (Billboard)	18
US Top Rock Albums (Billboard)	23

=== Year-end charts ===
Chart (2010)	Position
US Billboard 200	189
US Top Rock Albums (Billboard)	50

== Certifications and sales ==
Region	Certification	Certified units/sales
United Kingdom (BPI)	Silver	60,000^{^}
United States (RIAA)	Platinum	1,000,000^{‡}
^{^} Shipments figures based on certification alone.^{‡} Sales+streaming figures based on certification alone.

== Release history ==
Region	Date	Label	Format	Catalogue
Europe	23 June 2008	Relentless Records	CD	CDRELX17, 50999 206399 2 1
United States	24 March 2009	RCA/Jive Label Group	CD	
