= Opening Night (2016 film) =

- Directed by: Isaac Rentz
- Written by: Gerry De Leon; Greg Lisi
- Produced by: Daniel Posada; Jason Tamasco; Alex Garcia; Topher Grace
- Starring: Topher Grace; Anne Heche; Taye Diggs; Alona Tal; Rob Riggle; Paul Scheer; JC Chasez
- Cinematography: Andre Lascaris
- Edited by: Lauren Connelly
- Music by: PJ Hanke
- Production companies: Dark Factory Entertainment; Itaca Films; Globecom
- Distributed by: Instrum International
- Release dates: June 3, 2016 (Los Angeles Film Festival); June 2, 2017 (United States)
- Running time: 90 minutes
- Country: United States
- Language: English

Opening Night (formerly One Shot) is an American musical comedy film directed by Isaac Rentz and written by Gerry De Leon and Greg Lisi. The film takes place in real time, backstage on the opening night of a Broadway musical.

The film centers on a failed Broadway actor (Topher Grace) turned production manager who must save the show on opening night by wrangling together his eccentric cast and crew. The film had its world premiere at the Los Angeles Film Festival on June 3, 2016. It was later given a limited theatrical release on June 2, 2017.

== Plot ==
Nick is a former Broadway actor who now works as a production manager for the stage musical "One Hit Wonderland", a musical journey through one-hit wonders of the past. His ex-girlfriend Chloe happens to be an understudy, making run-ins backstage between them awkward.

As part of the show’s opening night on Broadway, Nick must deal with a seemingly never-ending list of dilemmas and crises, including helping his anxious assistant Alex, consoling a dancer who has a meltdown over a deceased pet, and keeping watch on Brooke, a quirky, unstable former Broadway star. In addition, an argument breaks out between dancers Brandy and Malcolm over men, just minutes before the opening curtain. Nick has to get the show headliner JC Chasez, a former member of boy band NSYNC who is now a self-absorbed womanizer, to focus by ousting chorus girls from his dressing room.

Nick is upset to learn Chloe has had sex with JC, albeit while drunk. He confides to Malcolm that he broke up with Chloe a year ago, when she wanted them to move in after four years together. Meanwhile, Brooke is accidentally knocked out by Ron from props, so Chloe has to take her place onstage. Nick, wary of Chloe's involvement with JC, is not very encouraging of her debut. When she comes onstage, Chloe seems briefly frozen, but becomes unstuck and nails her performance. When Nick congratulates her, she snubs him.

Malcolm goes into detail with Nick about his hookup with Brandy's boyfriend. Brandy confronts Malcolm, and she proposes a competition to see who can seduce someone first. Malcolm chooses fellow dancer Xavier, who he says is bisexual.

JC asks Nick to send Chloe to his dressing room to "rehearse" during intermission, with the implication he has other intentions. While checking on Brooke, Nick gives her two pills that he believes are aspirin from stage medic Lee’s jacket, but are actually ecstasy. When Nick realizes his mistake, he tries to get Brooke to vomit the pills back up, but he is unsuccessful and leaves Ron to watch her in the dressing room.

Malcolm attempts to seduce Xavier under the guise of massaging him. Xavier resists Malcolm’s advances, which delights Brandy, but Malcolm insists he's still in the running to win the competition. Brooke, now underneath the drug’s influence, manages to escape from Ron. Brooke makes it to a small stage lift. Nick tries to get Brooke out of the lift but inadvertently ends up onstage himself.

During intermission, Chloe goes into JC's dressing room as requested. JC tries to serenade her, but she is not impressed. He confesses that he puts up a front of being a confident guy, when really he knows he is washed-up. Chloe says she is not interested in him romantically, but appreciates his candidness. Malcolm and his crew face off with Brandy's for Xavier, who chooses Malcolm.

Goldmeyer, a producer and Nick’s boss, gives a coveted job offer to Chloe; she is initially dazed but swiftly accepts. Nick is dismayed to learn she's leaving NYC. Chloe confesses she still loves him, but he doesn't meet her halfway. While she goes to say her goodbyes to the crew and dancers, Nick complains about the situation to Malcolm. Malcolm, fed up with Nick’s negativity, tells Nick if he does not take chances, he will never move ahead with his life.

Finally inspired, Nick takes to the stage, which he has not performed on since his acting days. He serenades Chloe with the song "To Be with You" and they kiss.

== Cast ==
- Topher Grace as Nick
- Alona Tal as Chloe
- Anne Heche as Brooke
- Taye Diggs as Malcolm
- Rob Riggle as Goldmeyer
- Paul Scheer as Ron
- JC Chasez as himself
- Lauren Lapkus as Alex Bean
- Lesli Margherita as Brandy
- Brian Huskey as Lee
- Zach Cregger as Micky
- Johnny Ray Gill as Eric
- Diego de Tovar as Xavier
- Peter Serafinowicz as Waldo (voice)

== Production ==
In November 2014, it was revealed that Taye Diggs had joined the cast of One Shot, with shooting set to begin in Mexico City.

Director Isaac Rentz said, "Topher and I tried to come up with a musical theme that would work on an indie budget. We thought 'one hit wonder' was perfect because it matched the theme of the movie and there are so many songs to choose from. We made a huge list-probably a couple hundred- and then begged every record label in town. It was a lot of favors. I think at one point, Topher had to show up at someone’s birthday party to get the rights to 'To Be With You'".

In 2016, the name of the film was changed to Opening Night, before its premiere at the Los Angeles Film Festival as part of the Limelight section. On October 26, 2016, the first official red band trailer was released to the internet.

== Reception ==
Gary Goldstein of the Los Angeles Times wrote Opening Night "proves a funny and sexy, if decidedly slight, backstage comedy. Anchored by an engaging turn by Topher Grace as Nick, a failed Broadway performer turned stage manager, the film, directed by Isaac Rentz from a script by Gerry De Leon and Greg Lisi, packs plenty of music and mischief into its brief running time." Goldstein praised the "enjoyable musical numbers, both on stage and off". Writing for GayEssential, Alistair Ryder said, "With a plethora of memorable characters in ridiculous situations all co-existing in the same breathing space, the film easily manages to be consistently funny, never running out of steam in its race to the finish line."

Chasez received praise for playing "an over-exaggerated version of himself with NSYNC memorabilia plastered all over his dressing room walls and a life-sized and shirtless cardboard cutout in the corner. He is both goofy and earnest, poking fun at his boy band past much to the enjoyment of the audience".
