= Back Against the Wall (song) =

Single by Cage the Elephant

from the album Cage the Elephant
- Released: February 2, 2009 (UK); July 28, 2009 (US)
- Recorded: 2008
- Genre: Rock
- Length: 3:45
- Label: Relentless (UK); Jive/RED (US)
- Songwriter: Cage the Elephant
- Producer: Jay Joyce

Cage the Elephant singles chronology
"Ain't No Rest for the Wicked" (2008)	"Back Against the Wall" (2009)	"Shake Me Down" (2010)

"Back Against the Wall" is a song by the American rock band Cage the Elephant. It was released as the fourth single from the band's 2008 first album, Cage the Elephant. In the issue dated March 6, 2010, the single topped the Billboard Alternative Songs chart, becoming the band's first number 1 single.

== Release and reception ==
Cage the Elephant re-recorded "Back Against the Wall" from their debut album for the release of the single. Released in February 2009 in the United Kingdom, the single's B-sides include the acoustic track "Cover Me Again", a cover version of MGMT's "Kids" recorded for Radio 1's Live Lounge, and a cover version of Pavement's "False Skorpion", a B-side to their 1995 "Rattled by la Rush" single. On iTunes, an exclusive cover of Iodine's Monkey Disease is available as the B-side.

The song peaked at number one on Billboard's Alternative Songs chart in March 2010. It also reached number 12 on the Rock Songs chart, number 92 on the Canadian Hot 100, and number 127 on the UK Singles Chart. Robin Murray of Clash magazine described the song as a "raucous blast of grimy rock 'n' roll". Aysha Hussain of This Is Fake DIY says that while the song "chugs along pleasantly enough", it sounds "a little contrived" and "finds itself too comfortable, in danger of being throwaway".

The song was featured in an episode of the television show "One Tree Hill" and "The Vampire Diaries".

== Music video ==
In the song's music video, the band members wage war against some gnomes. The grandmother of the Shultz brothers had several gnomes in her yard, which used to 'creep out' Matt Shultz. The video was directed by Isaac Rentz and shot in Los Angeles, CA.

== Track listing ==
7" Vinyl

1. "Back Against the Wall" (Cage the Elephant) – 3:46
2. "False Skorpion" (Malkmus) – 2:09

Digital single, CD

1. "Back Against the Wall" (Cage the Elephant) – 3:46
2. "Cover Me Again" (Cage the Elephant) – 3:10
3. "Kids" (VanWyngarden, Goldwasser) (Radio 1 Lounge version) – 3:39
4. "False Skorpion" (Malkmus) – 2:09

iTunes version

1. "Back Against the Wall" – 3:46
2. "Monkey Disease (Iodine cover) – 1:26

== Chart performance ==
=== Weekly charts ===
Chart (2009–2010)	Peak position
Canadian Hot 100	72
UK Singles Chart	127
US Billboard Alternative Songs	1
US Billboard Mainstream Rock Tracks	26
US Billboard Rock Songs	12

=== Year-end charts ===
Chart (2010)	Position
US Hot Rock Songs (Billboard)	32
US Alternative Songs (Billboard)	12

== Certifications ==
Region	Certification	Certified units/sales
United States (RIAA)	Platinum	1,000,000^{‡}
^{‡} Sales+streaming figures based on certification alone.

== See also ==
- List of number-one Billboard Alternative Songs of 2010
