= Ain't No Rest for the Wicked =

2008 single by Cage the Elephant

Single by Cage the Elephant

from the album Cage the Elephant
- Released: June 16, 2008
- Genre: Alternative rock; blues rock; southern rock
- Length: 2:55
- Label: Relentless
- Songwriters: Jared Champion, Lincoln Parish, Brad Shultz, Matt Shultz, Daniel Tichenor
- Producer: Jay Joyce

Cage the Elephant singles chronology
"In One Ear" (2008)	"Ain't No Rest for the Wicked" (2008)	"Back Against the Wall" (2009)

Audio sample
- file; help

"Ain't No Rest for the Wicked" is the third single by the American rock band Cage the Elephant. It was released as a CD single on June 16, 2008, by Relentless Records and became the first Top 40 hit for the band in the UK. A music video was filmed for this song which was directed by D.A.R.Y.L of Pulse Films. A later re-release in North America the following year reached number 92 on the Billboard Hot 100, reached number 3 on the Alternative Songs chart and number 8 on the Mainstream Rock Tracks chart.

== Composition ==
The song talks about three particular instances in which the narrator realizes "there ain't no rest for the wicked." First, he encounters a prostitute asking if he desires to spend the night with her. The narrator proceeds to ask her why she does what she does. The chorus (her response) analyzes the main reasons why individuals follow the paths they follow ("...Money don't grow on trees, I've got bills to pay, I've got mouths to feed..."). The narrator, less than fifteen minutes later, is held at gunpoint by a criminal, whom he asks the same question and from whom he receives the same answer. Finally, upon arriving home and turning on the television, the narrator sees a preacher being arrested for stealing the funds of his church. This is followed by a third chorus saying that everyone is the same and we all have no rest "until we close our eyes for good."

Lead singer Matt Shultz stated the song was inspired by an old co-worker of his who at the time was a drug dealer. When Shultz asked him why he dealt drugs, the co-worker told him that "There's no rest for the wicked." Shultz was a plumber at the time, and said that he wrote the lyrics on a piece of drywall which he found while working at his co-worker's house.

== Reception ==
BBC Music wrote that the song "certainly makes you sit up and take notice. It's a sing-along rhythm and blues anthem for the disaffected. Expect to be hearing this blast out of cars for weeks." Charles Ubaghs of Drowned in Sound added "Ain’t No Rest for the Wicked" may read like the title for some rollicking slice of southern-rock hellfire, the actual result is something more akin to a mutant hybrid of Kid Rock and the chart fodder of McFly. It’s a fatal flaw that rears itself again and again as a bastardised version of blue-collar Americana is force-fed a mass-produced strain of bland modern rock throughout all eleven tracks."

== Commercial performance ==
The song became the band’s first hit single reaching number 32 on the UK Singles chart, 37 on the singles download chart and number 8 on the physical singles chart. It also reached number 24 on the Scottish Singles chart and 42 on Canada Hot 100. It became the bands first song to make the Billboard Hot 100, peaking at number 83 it also reached number 3 on the Alternative Songs chart and number 8 on the Mainstream Rock Tracks chart. It has been certified platinum in both Brazil and the UK, as of 2026 it is their best selling song in the US having been certified platinum 8x by the RIAA.

== Usage in media ==
The song appeared in the opening and closing sequences of the first Borderlands game; a commercial for the TNT series Leverage; in the 2010 film The Bounty Hunter; in an episode of The Vampire Diaries ("Isobel"); in a third-season episode of Jersey Shore; as the opening song of Canadian reality television series Yukon Gold; and Cage the Elephant performed the song on television on the Late Show with David Letterman. In the pilot episode for Fox's Lucifer, the song is in both the opening and closing scenes of the episode. It was also used in the Netflix series 13 Reasons Why and in Hawaii Five-0. Internationally, it was used in the background of the Australian series, Packed to the Rafters. In 2021 it appeared in an episode of the Outer banks.

A live version of the song appears on their 2012 album Live from the Vic in Chicago and their 2017 album Unpeeled.

== Track listings ==
1. "Ain't No Rest for the Wicked" – 2:52
2. "Ain't No Rest for the Wicked" (Acoustic Version) – 3:02

== Charts ==
=== Weekly charts ===
Weekly chart performance for "Ain't No Rest for the Wicked"
Chart (2008–2009)	Peak position
Canada Hot 100 (Billboard)	42
Canada Rock (Billboard)	2
Scottish Singles Sales (Official Charts)	24
UK Singles (Official Charts)	32
US Billboard Hot 100	83
US Hot Rock & Alternative Songs (Billboard)	6

=== Year-end charts ===
Year-end chart performance for "Ain't No Rest for the Wicked"
Chart (2009)	Position
US Hot Rock Songs (Billboard)	13

== Certifications ==
Certifications for "Ain't No Rest for the Wicked"
Region	Certification	Certified units/sales
Brazil (Pro-Música Brasil)	Platinum	60,000^{‡}
United Kingdom (BPI)	Platinum	600,000^{‡}
United States (RIAA)	8× Platinum	8,000,000^{‡}
^{‡} Sales+streaming figures based on certification alone.
