= All We Ever Knew =

Single by the Head and the Heart

from the album Signs of Light
- Released: June 3, 2016
- Length: 3:46
- Label: Warner Bros.
- Songwriters: The Head and the Heart
- Producer: Jay Joyce

The Head and the Heart singles chronology
| "Let's Be Still" (2014) | "All We Ever Knew" (2016) | "Rhythm & Blues" (2016) |

Music video
- "All We Ever Knew" on YouTube

"All We Ever Knew" is a song written and recorded by American folk band the Head and the Heart, released as the lead single for their third studio album Signs of Light by Warner Bros. Records. The song was written by the band and produced by Jay Joyce.

== Commercial performance ==
"All We Ever Knew" spent eight weeks at number one on Billboard's Adult Alternative Songs chart, and became their first song to chart on the Alternative Songs chart. The song is also their highest-peaking song on the Hot Rock Songs chart.

== Charts ==
=== Weekly charts ===
| Chart (2016–17) | Peak position |
|---|---|
| Belgium (Ultratip Bubbling Under Flanders) | 48 |
| Canada Rock (Billboard) | 32 |
| Switzerland Airplay (Schweizer Hitparade) | 72 |
| US Adult Pop Airplay (Billboard) | 24 |
| US Hot Rock & Alternative Songs (Billboard) | 13 |
| US Rock & Alternative Airplay (Billboard) | 4 |

=== Year-end charts ===
| Chart (2016) | Position |
|---|---|
| US Hot Rock Songs (Billboard) | 44 |
| US Rock Airplay (Billboard) | 17 |

== Certifications ==
| Region | Certification | Certified units/sales |
|---|---|---|
| Canada (Music Canada) | Platinum | 80,000^{‡} |
| United States (RIAA) | Platinum | 1,000,000^{‡} |
^{‡} Sales+streaming figures based on certification alone.
