= Living Mirage =

Studio album by The Head and the Heart
- Released: May 17, 2019
- Genre: Indie folk; indie pop; indie rock
- Length: 41:42
- Label: Warner Bros., Reprise
- Producer: Tyler Johnson, Alex Salibian

The Head and the Heart chronology
Signs of Light (2016)	Living Mirage (2019)	Every Shade of Blue (2022)

Singles from Living Mirage
- 1. "Missed Connection" Released: March 14, 2019; 2. "Honeybee" Released: April 5, 2019; 3. "See You Through My Eyes" Released: 2019

Professional ratings
Review scores
Source	Rating
Rolling Stone	2.5/5 stars

Living Mirage is the fourth studio album by American band The Head and the Heart, and second album released through Warner Bros. Records. It was announced on March 14, 2019, and officially released on May 17, 2019. "Missed Connection" was released as the first single on the same day of the album announcement.

On June 26, 2020, the band released a digital deluxe version of the album titled Living Mirage: The Complete Recordings featuring four new songs.

== Development ==
Living Mirage is The Head and the Heart's first studio album since 2016’s Signs of Light. The album was initially considered by the band during a retreat to Joshua Tree National Park. The writing and recording process continued across the country, with sessions in Wisconsin, Seattle, Nashville and Los Angeles. Living Mirage is also the first album that does not feature co-founder Josiah Johnson.

== Release and promotion ==
Living Mirage peaked at number sixteen on the US Billboard 200. On May 22, 2019, the band announced the North American Living Mirage Tour consisting of thirty-nine dates. The tour kicked-off in Buffalo, New York on June 21, 2019.

=== Singles ===
On March 14, 2019, "Missed Connection" was released as the album's lead single and was made available for purchase and streaming. The music video was released on April 9, 2019. The second single, "Honeybee" was released on April 5, 2019.

On May 16, 2019, they performed "Missed Connection" on The Tonight Show Starring Jimmy Fallon.

== Track listing ==
Living Mirage track listing
No.	Title	Length
1.	"See You Through My Eyes"	3:54
2.	"Missed Connection"	3:15
3.	"People Need a Melody"	4:12
4.	"Honeybee"	3:16
5.	"Brenda"	3:48
6.	"Running Through Hell"	3:39
7.	"Up Against the Wall"	3:33
8.	"Saving Grace"	3:38
9.	"I Found Out"	3:53
10.	"Living Mirage"	5:14
11.	"Glory of Music"	3:20
Total length:		41:42

Living Mirage: The Complete Recordings – 2020 deluxe edition
No.	Title	Length
1.	"Living Mirage"	5:14
2.	"See You Through My Eyes"	3:54
3.	"Missed Connection"	3:15
4.	"Sun Is Rising"	3:25
5.	"Glory of Music II"	4:41
6.	"People Need a Melody"	4:12
7.	"Honeybee"	3:16
8.	"Brenda"	3:48
9.	"Backwards Breathing"	4:39
10.	"Running Through Hell"	3:39
11.	"Up Against the Wall"	3:33
12.	"Saving Grace"	3:38
13.	"I Found Out"	3:53
14.	"One Big Mystery"	3:37
15.	"Glory of Music"	3:20
Total length:		58:08

== Charts ==
Chart (2019)	Peak position
Canadian Albums (Billboard)	28
US Billboard 200	16
US Top Rock Albums (Billboard)	3
