= Ready to Let Go =

Single by Cage the Elephant

from the album Social Cues
- Released: January 31, 2019
- Genre: Alternative rock
- Length: 3:08
- Label: RCA
- Songwriter: Cage the Elephant
- Producer: John Hill

Cage the Elephant singles chronology
"Cold Cold Cold" (2017)	"Ready to Let Go" (2019)	"Social Cues" (2019)

"Ready to Let Go" is a song by American alternative rock band Cage the Elephant. It was produced by John Hill and was released as the lead single from the band's fifth studio album Social Cues on January 31, 2019. It reached number five on Billboard Alternative Songs chart in the United States.

== Background ==
The song was born from frontman Matt Shultz's as he was inspired to write the song after a trip to Pompeii with his former wife, during which he realized their relationship was falling apart. The song is characterized by its indie-rock sound with a haunting Pompeii-inspired theme and a theme of moving on from a broken relationship. Its composition features a signature indie-rock style with a catchy, rhythmic texture, a chugging bassline, and a distorted guitar melody that contribute to its hypnotic sound.

== Music video ==
The songs official music video was directed by lead singer Matt Shultz, the video features several horror themes throughout.

When asked about the video Shultz stated:

I think the truth is just scary as hell, Things you think about — betrayal, murder, redemption, forgiveness, love, hate — evoke all these actions and words. So at first I was really leaning into symbolism and I think we bring to light some pretty heavy truths, pretty scary. I'm glad it came across that way.

== Reception ==
Laura Anaya-Morga of Highlander News noted that the song features "the bands signature indie-rock sound" adding "The song’s scrappy electric guitar and rhythmic texture make it a catchy tune for anyone to enjoy." Similarly Abbie Jennings of When the Horn Blows wrote "it is a seriously catchy, toe tapping come back single. The song itself could easily be a forgotten B-side from their previous album ‘Tell Me I’m Pretty’, or earlier material. Their distinct sound is instantly recognizable." The Independent dubbed "Ready to let Go" "the most explicit song" on the album describing it as "a moody swamp-rock jam where Shultz comes to terms with his impending divorce."

However Consequence gave the song a more negative review stating its "Predictable and innocuous, it doesn’t do anything to advance Cage the Elephant’s stylistic evolution."

== Charts ==
Chart performance for "Ready to Let Go"
Chart (2019)	Peak position
Canada All-format Airplay (Billboard)	45
Canada Rock (Billboard)	1
Iceland (RÚV)	6
US Hot Rock & Alternative Songs (Billboard)	7
US Rock & Alternative Airplay (Billboard)	1

== Certifications ==
Certifications for "Ready to Let Go"
Region	Certification	Certified units/sales
Canada (Music Canada)	Gold	40,000^{‡}
United States (RIAA)	Gold	500,000^{‡}
^{‡} Sales+streaming figures based on certification alone.

== Release history ==
Release history and formats for "Ready to Let Go"
Region	Date	Format	Label
United States	January 31, 2019	Modern rock radio	RCA
