= Wear Me Out =

Single by Skylar Grey

from the album Don't Look Down
- Released: June 4, 2013
- Recorded: 2013
- Genre: Pop
- Length: 3:29
- Songwriter(s): Skylar Grey; Jonathan Rotem

Skylar Grey singles chronology
"Final Warning" (2013)	"Wear Me Out" (2013)	"White Suburban" (2013)

"Wear Me Out" is a pop song recorded by American recording artist Skylar Grey for her second studio album Don't Look Down. The song was released on iTunes on June 4, 2013. The song was written by Skylar Grey and J.R. Rotem while its production was handled by the latter. The song was released onto digital outlets on June 4, 2013.

== Music video ==
=== Development ===
The music video for "Wear Me Out" was filmed in the woods and directed by Isaac Rents. The behind-the-scenes video was directed by Peter Harding. It was released onto VEVO and YouTube on June 11, 2013.

=== Analysis and reception ===
The video begins with Grey walking to a camp site with a group of friends. It then to multiple different clips of Grey singing in front of a fire and an ax. Then multiple clips show Grey and her love interest (Noah Segan) being intimate and close in front of the fire and in their tent. Grey is also playing a red piano in the woods. It the features Grey's love interest feeding her pills. Yams sponsored the video, apparently due to Grey wearing a Yams hat and being involved in a Yams promotion shortly after the video was released.

The video has accumulated over 2 million views on video sharing site YouTube.

== Track listing ==
Digital download

1. "Wear Me Out" – 3:29
