= The Head and the Heart =

American indie folk band

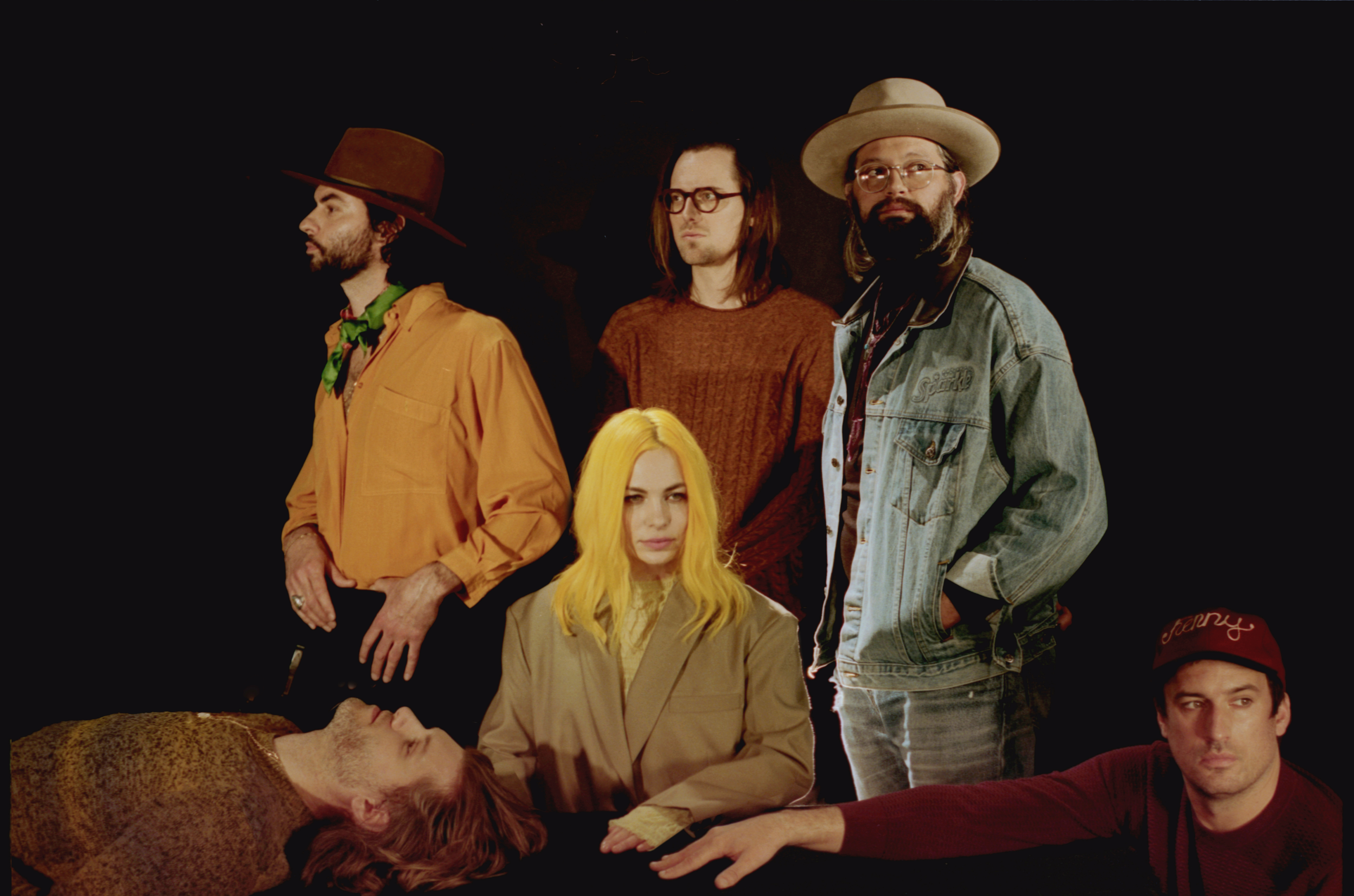

Background information
- Origin: Seattle, Washington, U.S.
- Genres: Indie folk; folk rock; indie rock
- Years active: 2009–present
- Labels: Verve; Warner Bros.; Heavenly (UK); Kobalt (UK); Sub Pop (US)
- Members: Jonathan Russell; Charity Rose Thielen; Matt Gervais; Chris Zasche; Kenny Hensley; Tyler Williams
- Past members: Josiah Johnson
- Website: www.theheadandtheheart.com

The Head and the Heart is an American indie folk band. They were formed in the summer of 2009 by Josiah Johnson (vocals, guitar, percussion) and Jonathan Russell (vocals, guitar, percussion). The band currently includes Russell, Charity Rose Thielen (violin, guitar, vocals), Chris Zasche (bass), Kenny Hensley (piano), Tyler Williams (drums), and Matt Gervais (guitar, vocals). The band is signed to Verve Records and have released six albums. Their sixth studio album, Aperture, was released on May 9, 2025.

== History ==
The members met and the band was formed through a series of open mic nights at Seattle's Conor Byrne pub in Ballard, Seattle. Josiah Johnson had moved to Seattle from Southern California to attend graduate school, and Jonathan Russell had recently relocated from Richmond, Virginia. They met keyboardist Kenny Hensley, who had also moved to Seattle to pursue musical score-writing, and Charity Rose Thielen, who had recently returned from a year studying abroad in Paris at Sciences Po. Drummer Tyler Williams had been in the band Prabir and The Substitutes in Richmond, Virginia and moved to Seattle to be a part of the Head and The Heart after hearing a demo that Russell sent of the song "Down In The Valley". Chris Zasche was bartending at the Conor Byrne Pub, working aftercare shifts at The Perkins School, and playing in Seattle bands The Maldives and Grand Hallway. He was the last to be added to original lineup.

Johnson explained how the name of the band was chosen: "Your head is telling you to be stable and find a good job, you know in your heart that this [the band] is what you're supposed to do even if it's crazy."

== Albums ==
=== The Head and the Heart ===
Self-burned copies of The Head and the Heart in handmade denim sleeves were being sold at shows within a few weeks, and soon local record stores Easy Street and Sonic Boom couldn't keep them in stock. After a "feeding frenzy" of interest from record labels and managers, the band signed with Sub Pop in November 2010. Sub Pop remastered the album, expanded it with a studio version of their traditional concert closer "Rivers and Roads", and re-recorded one song ("Sounds Like Hallelujah"). The album was re-released in CD format, and for the first time on vinyl LP, on Record Store Day 2011. The band is signed with Heavenly Recordings in the United Kingdom and Europe.

The band toured extensively through 2010 and 2011 in both the United States and Europe, and opened for Vampire Weekend, The Walkmen, Dr. Dog, Dave Matthews, The Low Anthem, The Decemberists, Iron & Wine, My Morning Jacket, and Death Cab For Cutie, as well as headlining their own shows. In March 2011, Seattle's City Arts Magazine named them "Seattle's Best New Band", and the band made their network television debut on April 21, 2011, on Conan. The album reached the Billboard 200 Album Charts at No. 110 and the record stayed on the chart for ten weeks.

=== Let's Be Still ===
The band's second album Let's Be Still was released on October 15, 2013. Recorded in Seattle and produced together with Shawn Simmons, the first track, "Shake," was aired on the August 5, 2013. Frontman Johnson said of it "...this is the first time that we produced as a full band. This one is everyone's influences equally present and prevalent throughout the album". James Christopher Monger of AllMusic said of the album: "The group's predilection for heartfelt, Avett Brothers-meets-Fleet Foxes roots rock is apparent right out of the gate with "Homecoming Heroes" and "Another Story," both of which utilize familiar folk-rock architecture to spin earnest and familiar tales concerning the two body parts from which the group takes its name." On November 2, 2013, Let's Be Still reached number 10 on the Billboard 200 albums chart. The band spent much of 2014 touring in support of the album. Thielen also spent time writing for other artists, including Mavis Staples. Thielen and Matt Gervais got married in 2015.

=== Signs of Light ===
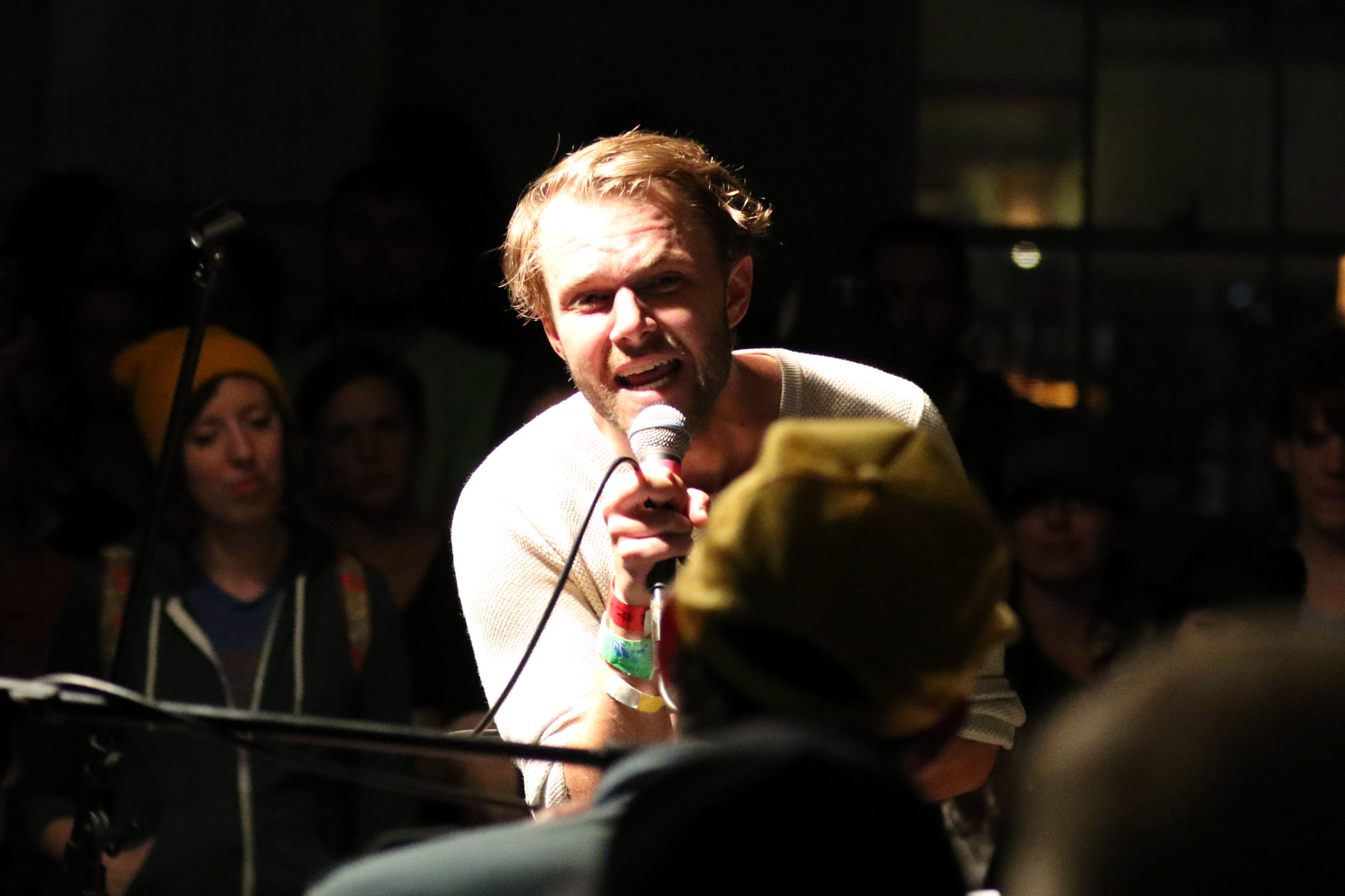
Josiah Johnson, vocalist for The Head and the Heart, performing in 2015.

The band released their third studio album, Signs of Light, in September 2016, and toured in North America and Europe following its release.

In the middle of 2015, Johnson and Russell began the writing process for the third album at Montecito Heights in Los Angeles. The band continued recording for much of the year, it was announced in March 2016 that Johnson would not feature in the touring plans of the band and instead do his best to manage his drug addiction. He was replaced by Thielen's husband Matt Gervais. In September 2016 the band released their third album Signs of Light. It was preceded by the single "All We Ever Knew".

The band toured throughout 2017 with performances at Coachella, Red Rocks Amphitheatre, Hinterland Music Festival, and Lollapalooza.

=== Living Mirage ===
On March 14, 2019, the band announced their fourth album, Living Mirage, would be released on May 17, and the first single "Missed Connection". On April 5, the band released a second single from the album, titled "Honeybee". They also revealed a March 21 livestream performance at The Belasco in Los Angeles, CA. The band announced a spring/autumn 2019 tour that consists of 38 North American shows.

=== Every Shade of Blue ===
On January 21, 2022, the band released a single, "Every Shade of Blue" from their fifth studio album of the same name, which was released April 29, 2022.

=== Aperture ===
Their sixth studio album, Aperture, was released on May 9, 2025 through Verve Forecast Records. It is self-produced and reflects a shift toward more introspective songwriting and expansive arrangements.

== In popular culture ==
"Rivers and Roads", one of the band's singles, was used in the series finale of the American television program Chuck. It was played in the sitcom How I Met Your Mother, at the end of the 16th episode of the 7th season, in the last scene of the season 4 finale of New Girl, and in the last two scenes of the 14th episode, titled "She", of the TV show The Good Doctor. It can also be heard at the end of the New Amsterdam season 2 episode "Hiding Behind My Smile".

Their single, "Down in the Valley", was played in the season finale of the British television program Beaver Falls, was also featured in Sons of Anarchy in the 5th-season episode 9 "Andare Pescare", and was used at the end of episode 5 of the first season of Battle Creek.

The band made a cameo appearance in the series Hart of Dixie, performing their song, "Shake", in episode 3 of the 3rd season. Their song "Lost in My Mind" was played in the same series' episode "Hairdos & Holidays". "Lost in My Mind" was also the backing track for the theatrical trailer of Silver Linings Playbook.

The first episode of season two of BYUtv's AUDIO-FILES centered on the band and featured live performances of "Winter Song" (performed atop a Ferris wheel), "Sounds Like Hallelujah", etc. The song "Let's Be Still" appears in a 2015 television commercial for Corona. "Let's Be Still" was also featured in an episode of the second season of The Night Shift and at the end of season one, episode three of Heartbeat.

The band is featured in the first episode Showtime television comedy drama Roadies created by Cameron Crowe. The Head and the Heart is the opening act in the first episode of the series, opening for the band that a fictionalized road crew, managed by Luke Wilson's character "Bill", dutifully supports as they make their way across the country in a major multi-city tour.

On February 6, 2026 the band played a sold-out show with the Seattle Symphony at Benaroya Hall in Seattle, Washington to kick off a year of celebrating the 15th anniversary of their debut album.

== Films ==
The band is featured in a club scene in the 2013 film Lucky Them, performing their song "Shake".

Their song "No One to Let You Down" is heard over the end credits of the 2014 film Wish I Was Here.

Their song "Rivers and Roads" was featured prominently in the 2016 documentary Gleason, which chronicles the life of ex-NFL player Steve Gleason and his living with ALS. Gleason and his wife sing a line from the song to their newborn son Rivers. The song also plays at the end of the film.

== Discography ==
=== Albums ===
==== Studio albums ====
List of studio albums, with selected chart positions, sales figures and certifications
Title	Details	Peak chart positions							Certifications
Title	Details	US	US Folk	US Rock	AUS Hit.	CAN	NLD Alt.	SWE	Certifications
The Head and the Heart	Released: April 19, 2011; Label: Sub Pop	109	3	23	—	—	27	15	RIAA: Platinum; MC: Gold
Let's Be Still	Released: October 15, 2013; Label: Sub Pop	10	1	5	13	13	—	—	RIAA: Gold
Signs of Light	Released: September 9, 2016; Label: Warner Bros.	5	1	1	8	26	—	—	
Living Mirage	Released: May 17, 2019; Label: Warner Bros., Reprise	16	1	3	—	28	—	—	
Every Shade of Blue	Released: April 29, 2022; Label: Warner, Reprise	— (Note: Every Shade of Blue did not enter the US Billboard 200, but peaked at number 54 on the US Top Album Sales Chart.)	21	—	—	—	—	—	
Aperture	Released: May 9, 2025; Label: Verve Forecast	—	—	—	—	—	—	—	
"—" denotes a recording that did not chart or was not released in that territory.

==== Live albums ====
List of EPs, with selected chart positions
Title	Details	Peak chart positions
Title	Details	US Current
Live from Pike Place Market	Released: April 22, 2017; Label: Reprise	64

=== EPs ===
List of EPs, with selected chart positions
Title	Details	Peak chart positions		
Title	Details	US	US Folk	US Rock
iTunes Session	Released: November 29, 2011; Label: Sub Pop	— (Note: iTunes Session did not enter the US Billboard 200, but peaked at number five on the US Heatseekers Albums Chart.)	6	47
Stinson Beach Sessions	Released: April 22, 2017; Label: Warner	— (Note: Stinson Beach Sessions did not enter the US Billboard 200, but peaked at number 20 on the Vinyl Albums Chart.)	—	—
"—" denotes a recording that did not chart or was not released in that territory.

=== Singles ===
List of singles, with selected chart positions and certifications, showing year released and album name
Title	Year	Peak positions									Certifications	Album
Title	Year	US AAA	US Adult	US Alt.	US Rock	BEL (FL)	BEL (WA)	CAN Rock	ICE	SWI Air	Certifications	Album
"Lost in My Mind"	2011	1	—	—	24	—	—	—	—	—	RIAA: Platinum; MC: Platinum	The Head and the Heart
"Down in the Valley"	2011	14	—	—	—	—	—	—	—	—	RIAA: Platinum; MC: Gold	The Head and the Heart
"Ghosts"	2012	—	—	—	—	—	—	—	—	—		The Head and the Heart
"Shake"	2013	4	—	—	— (Note: "Shake" did not enter the Rock Songs chart, but peaked at number 43 on the Rock Airplay chart.)	—	—	—	—	—	RIAA: Gold	Let's Be Still
"Another Story"	2013	10	—	—	— (Note: "Another Story" did not enter the Rock Songs chart, but peaked at number 39 on the Rock Digital Songs chart.)	—	—	—	—	—	RIAA: Gold; MC: Gold	Let's Be Still
"Let's Be Still"	2014	9	—	—	—	—	—	—	—	—	RIAA: Gold	Let's Be Still
"All We Ever Knew"	2016	1	24	1	13	95	—	32	—	72	RIAA: Platinum; MC: Platinum	Signs of Light
"Rhythm & Blues"	2016	2	—	21	— (Note: "Rhythm & Blues" did not enter the Rock Songs chart, but peaked at number 41 on the Rock Airplay chart.)	—	—	—	—	—		Signs of Light
"City of Angels"	2017	10	—	—	—	—	—	—	—	—		Signs of Light
"Don't Dream It's Over"	2017	—	—	—	—	—	—	—	—	—		Non-album single
"Missed Connection"	2019	1	—	1	11	—	— (Note: "Missed Connection" did not enter the Wallonie Ultratop Top 50, but charted as an "extra tip" on the Wallonie Ultratop Bubbling Under chart.)	20	39	—		Living Mirage
"Honeybee"	2019	2	29	1	12	—	—	38	—	—	RIAA: Platinum; MC: Platinum	Living Mirage
"See You Through My Eyes"	2019	13	—	36	— (Note: "See You Through My Eyes" did not enter the Rock Songs chart, but peaked at number 44 on the Rock Airplay chart.)	—	—	—	—	—		Living Mirage
"Our House"	2021	—	—	—	—	—	—	—	—	—		Non-album single
"Every Shade of Blue"	2022	40	—	—	—	—	—	—	—	—		Every Shade of Blue
"Virginia (Wind in the Night)"	2022	1	—	20	— (Note: "Virginia (Wind in the Night)" did not enter the Rock Songs chart, but peaked at number 19 on the Rock Airplay chart.)	—	—	—	—	100		Every Shade of Blue
"Tiebreaker"	2022	—	—	—	—	—	—	—	—	—		Every Shade of Blue
"Hurts (But It Goes Away)"	2022	36	—	—	—	—	—	—	—	—		Every Shade of Blue
"Arrow"	2024	1	26	1	—	—	—	—	—	—		Aperture
"After the Setting Sun"	2025	5	—	—	—	—	—	—	—	—		Aperture
"—" denotes a recording that did not chart or was not released in that territory.

=== Other charting songs ===
Title	Year	Peak positions		Certifications	Album
Title	Year	US Rock	BEL (FL)	Certifications	Album
"Rivers and Roads"	2011	— (Note: "Rivers and Roads" did not enter the Rock Songs chart, but peaked at number 48 on the Rock Digital Songs chart.)	—	RIAA: 2× Platinum; MC: Platinum	The Head and the Heart
"Homecoming Heroes"	2013	—	136		Let's Be Still
"—" denotes a recording that did not chart or was not released in that territory.

=== Compilation appearances ===
- "No One to Let You Down" (Sub Pop Records, Please To Enjoy: Terminal Sales Vol. 4 Sampler, 2011)
- "What Are You Doing New Year's Eve?" (Holidays Rule)
- "Don't Forget Me" (Sweetheart 2014)
