= Social Cues (song) =

Single by Cage the Elephant

from the album Social Cues
- Released: July 6, 2019
- Genre: Alternative rock
- Length: 3:39
- Label: RCA Records
- Songwriter: Cage the Elephant
- Producer: John Hill

Cage the Elephant singles chronology
"Ready to Let Go" (2019)	"Social Cues" (2019)	"Black Madonna" (2020)

"Social Cues" is a song by American alternative rock band Cage the Elephant. The title track to their fifth studio album Social Cues, it was released as the second single from the album on July 6, 2019. The song reached number one on the Billboard Alternative Airplay and Hot Rock & Alternative Songs charts.

== Reception ==
pancakesandwhisky.com stated the song “is brutally honest and exposed in the verses, but somehow drifts on air with a bright and shiny chorus.”

== Music video ==
On May 4, 2019 Cage the Elephant performed the song on Adult Swims FishCenter Live. They then used some of the footage from this performance for the song's official music video which was released on October 24, 2019 with additional directing came from front man Matt Shultz. The video leans into the albums semi-psychedelic sound, featuring multiple trippy colors and effects affecting both the scene behind the band.

== Charts ==
Chart (2019)	Peak position
Canada Rock (Billboard)	5
US Hot Rock & Alternative Songs (Billboard)	5
US Rock & Alternative Airplay (Billboard)	1
US Alternative Airplay (Billboard)	1

== Certification ==
Certifications for "Social Cues"
Region	Certification	Certified units/sales
United States (RIAA)	Gold	500,000^{‡}
^{‡} Sales+streaming figures based on certification alone.
