= Matt Shultz =

American singer

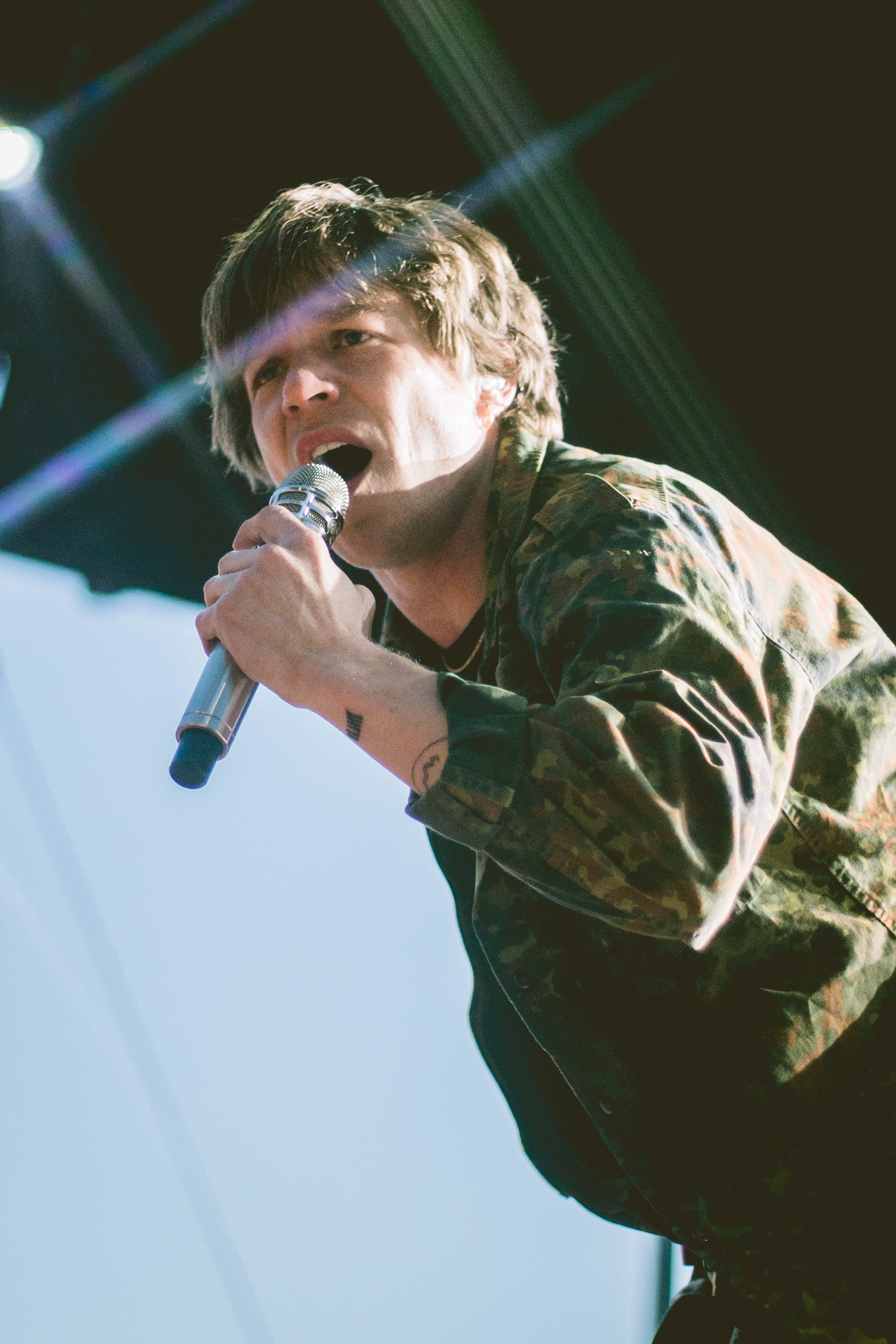
- Shultz performing in 2017

Background information
- Born: Matthew Ray Shultz; October 23, 1983 (age 42); Bowling Green, Kentucky, U.S.
- Genres: Alternative rock; garage rock; punk blues; blues rock; indie rock
- Occupations: Singer; songwriter
- Instruments: Vocals; guitar
- Member of: Cage the Elephant; Perfect Confusion

Matthew Ray Shultz (born October 23, 1983) is an American singer, songwriter and musician, best known as the lead singer and primary songwriter for the rock band Cage the Elephant.

== Early life ==
Matthew Ray Shultz was born on October 23, 1983, and raised in Bowling Green, Kentucky. His father, Donald Bradley Shultz Sr, was also a musician. Growing up, Shultz came from a poor background alongside his brother, Donald Bradley "Brad" Shultz Jr, which subjected them to teasing from their peers at school. Their parents separated when the brothers were young, which inspired them to begin writing music while they lived with their grandmother in a trailer park. Their mother disapproved of their passion for music and began dating his football coach after the divorce, and which prompted him to quit the team and play music as an act of rebellion. He attended Greenwood High School.

Before starting Cage the Elephant, Shultz worked in construction as a plumber. He said in an interview that he felt if he didn't quit that job, he would be stuck there for the rest of his life. He therefore quit and worked at a sandwich bar with Brad, who had previously worked in telemarketing.

== Career ==
=== Perfect Confusion ===
Before Cage the Elephant, Shultz was in a band with current bandmates Jared Champion and Brad Shultz known as Perfect Confusion. Perfect Confusion formed in 2001, and played smaller music venues around their hometown, Bowling Green. They released one self titled album in 2005, however the band broke up the same year, but the former members occasionally have reunions and performances.

=== Cage the Elephant ===
Shultz is best known as the lead singer and primary songwriter for the rock band Cage the Elephant. The band has released several albums, including Melophobia, Thank You, Happy Birthday, Tell Me I'm Pretty, and Social Cues, with the latter two winning Grammy Awards for Best Rock Album in 2016 and 2019, respectively.

==== 2006–2014: early years ====
In 2008, Shultz and his fellow band members moved to London, England, to gain a broader audience for their indie rock market after being discovered at the South by Southwest (SXSW) music festival in 2007. The move coincided with the release of their self-titled first album in the UK in June of that year. In 2011 their sophomore album Thank You Happy Birthday was released. In 2013 Melophobia was released, Shultz viewed the record as a battle "to remain transparent and to remain honest." Isaac Brock (frontman of Modest Mouse) once told his friend Tiger Merritt (of Morning Teleportation) that "if you're not slightly embarrassed to sing the lyrics, you're probably not writing a good song," and encouraged him to refrain from attempting to write poetically but rather naturally. Shultz said this made sense to him. When writing new tracks, Shultz would often doodle an image alongside his lyrics for visual reference.

==== 2015–2016: Depression, Memories, and the Making of Tell Me I'm Pretty ====
Released in 2015, Tell Me I'm Pretty marked a stylistic and emotional evolution for Cage the Elephant. Shultz described the album's title as both ironic and unsettling, capturing a generation's obsession with self-presentation amid emotional dislocation.

The track "Sweetie Little Jean" stands out as a deeply personal meditation on depression and childhood trauma. Matt revealed that the song weaves together the story of a young girl abducted from their neighborhood with his own struggles with memory and grief, making it a haunting reflection on presence and loss. He noted that depression can rob a person of emotional closeness, even when someone is physically near: "It's as if they are a ghost." Musically, he drew from a rich palette of influences—The Zombies, Motown, the Ramones, Neil Young, and Iggy Pop—while intentionally moving away from rock clichés and toward emotional transparency. Matt spoke of shedding performative personas in favor of authenticity, acknowledging the discomfort of creative vulnerability: "Allowing yourself to be naked… can be pretty painful."

Despite differing perspectives within the band, particularly between Matt and his brother Brad, their creative friction ultimately forged a more honest and nuanced record. As Matt put it, they sought to blend character with honesty—a kind of artistic duality he likened to combining Iggy Pop's energy with Neil Young's sincerity.

==== 2019–2020: Social Cues and personal turmoil ====
Cage the Elephant's fifth studio album, Social Cues (2019), marked a deeply personal and stylistically ambitious chapter in Matt Shultz's career. Written in the aftermath of his divorce, the album channeled his grief and emotional fragmentation into lyrics exploring identity, melancholy, and disconnection. The death of close friends and family, including Matt and Brad's cousin and Brad's father-in-law, deeply influenced not only the lyrics but also the instrumentation of the record.

Thematically, the record oscillates between bleak introspection and sonic vibrancy, a contrast often underscored by Shultz's lyrical ambiguity and vocal delivery. Tracks such as "Broken Boy" and "What I'm Becoming" delve into existential confusion, while others, like "Night Running", embrace a funk-driven surrealism that masks darker undertones. In interviews, Shultz emphasized the importance of engaging with the full emotional spectrum, resisting the pull of melodrama to instead "acknowledge all angles of emotion."—from frustration and anger, as in "Tokyo Smoke", to the quiet resignation and fragile hope of "Goodbye".

Critics praised the album's raw vulnerability and its textured musical palette, which incorporated electronic and psychedelic elements alongside the band's rock foundation. Social Cues would go on to win the Grammy Award for Best Rock Album, further cementing the band's reputation for blending accessibility with emotional depth.

==== 2020–2024: Mental health crisis and Neon Pill ====
In the early 2020s, Matt Shultz experienced a severe mental health crisis triggered by an adverse reaction to prescribed ADHD medication, which led to paranoid delusions and a break from reality. His condition culminated in a high-profile arrest in January 2023 in New York, where he was found with two loaded firearms. Shultz later avoided jail time through a plea deal and underwent extensive treatment, which he has credited with saving his life.

This turbulent period deeply influenced Cage the Elephant's sixth studio album, Neon Pill (2024). The album features lyrics reflecting Shultz's psychological descent and recovery, blending confessional songwriting with the band's evolving, genre-fluid sound. Songs like "Neon Pill" and "Rainbow" trace his personal trauma, including a temporary divorce from his wife Eva. In interviews, Shultz has spoken candidly about the dangers of blurring performance personas with personal identity and has since adopted a more grounded public presence. The band's return to touring in 2024 was met with critical acclaim, and Shultz has described the experience as a profound reset, offering new perspective on fame and artistic identity. On October 10, 2024, CBS Mornings aired a segment featuring Shultz and his brother Brad where Matt opened up about his psychosis.

== Personal life ==
Shultz was previously married to Juliette Buchs from 2014 until they separated in 2018. He then married fellow Kentucky-based actress, dancer and musician Eva Ross in early February 2020. "Love's The Only Way" was a song written by Matt for Eva while they were dating. Eva announced on December 1, 2021, that the couple had separated and were filing for divorce; however, they were remarried on October 24, 2023. Matt explained in an interview with CBS that he filed for divorce from Eva out of fear for her safety while experiencing psychosis and that she saved his life many times. Eva gave birth to their first child, a son, Huxley Shultz in June 2025.

Shultz has spoken about his three-year struggle with psychosis, triggered by ADHD medication. He described it as a "nightmarish" state of panic, paranoia and delusions. On January 6, 2023, Shultz was arrested in New York on charges of felony firearm possession. He was staying at The Bowery Hotel in Manhattan, where a hotel employee reportedly saw him carrying a firearm into the bathroom and called 9-1-1. In a plea bargain, Shultz pleaded guilty to three charges in exchange for avoiding jail time. Shultz called the arrest a "miracle", leading to hospital treatment and therapy.

== Discography ==
=== Perfect Confusion ===
- Perfect Confusion (2005)

=== Cage the Elephant ===
- Cage the Elephant (2008)
- Thank You, Happy Birthday (2011)
- Melophobia (2013)
- Tell Me I'm Pretty (2015)
- Social Cues (2019)
- Neon Pill (2024)

Guest appearances

- “The Lonesome Death of Hattie Carroll” (2012 Chimes of Freedom)
- "The Unforgiven" (2021 The Metallica Blacklist)

== Musical influences and style ==
Shultz cites bands such as the Pixies as influential on his vocal style, explaining that he discovered them alongside other punk bands while living in England during the recording of Thank You, Happy Birthday. His stage persona is inspired by punk pioneers such as Iggy Pop.

During the first two Cage the Elephant albums Shultz's lyrics touched upon not selling out. The album Thank You, Happy Birthday made this point with tracks like "Sell Yourself" and "Shake Me Down". However, since their 3rd studio album the lyrics have been more focused on Shultz's personal experiences, exploring his grief, depression, existential questioning and dealing with fame. When writing the lyrics for the band's album Melophobia, Shultz stated "You don't really write a song, you let a song find you." In the album Neon Pill Shultz's lyrics focus heavily on his mental health struggles.

== Art ==
Shultz began his art career as the lead singer and a founding member of Perfect Confusion in 2001. Later, he would also do the same with Cage the Elephant.

Beyond music, Shultz has explored various artistic fields, including dance, fashion design, visual art, and performance art. In March 2019, he collaborated with The Frye Company to release a boot collection inspired by archetypes such as the Punk Rocker, Cowboy, and Harlequin. Later that year, in August 2019, he threw his debut art show in Greenpoint, Brooklyn with New York artist Danny Cole, Beck, and other friends. The event was captured by Rolling Stone in a photo journal.

Shultz has also directed music videos for the multiple Cage the Elephant songs including "Cold Cold Cold", "Ready to Let Go", "Social Cues" and "Black Madonna".

== Stage presence ==
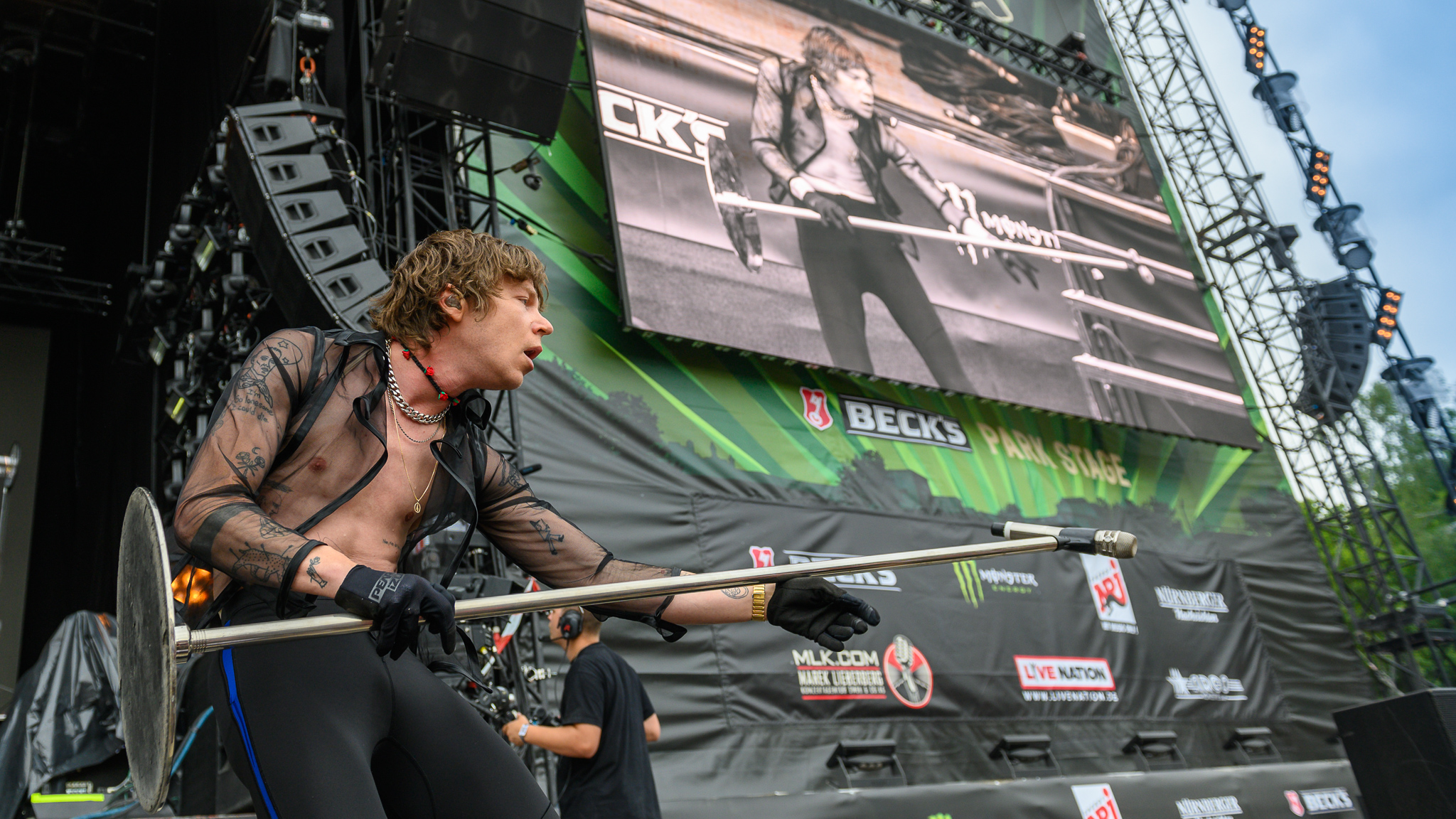
Shultz performing in 2019

Shultz is known for his showmanship during live shows, with energetic movements, dancing, crowd interactions, along with “signature jumps”, high energy antics including the occasional stage dive. He is also known to wear unique outfits.

The bands manager Peter Mensch has stated that Shultz performance is what makes the band special stating “He’s the guy. He’s Axl Rose, he’s Mick Jagger, he’s around the stage. We’ve got great players, but what elevates Cage The Elephant is Matt Shultz.” The Nashville scene described him as “the love child of David Bowie and Mick Jagger “throws his wiry frame around, hair flailing, with arrhythmic reckless abandon, aping Iggy antics like walking atop the outstretched hands of the crowd.”

Even when he suffered a foot injury during the band's 2024 tour and was on a scooter with one foot elevated and housed in a medical boot, he still managed to put on a show for the crowd popping wheelies and making sudden banks and turns.

== Accomplishments ==
Cage the Elephant's first nomination came in 2011, when the music video for "Shake Me Down" was nominated for the Best Rock Video at the 2011 MTV Video Music Awards. In 2014, Cage the Elephant was nominated for the Best Alternative Music Album for Melophobia, at the 57th Annual Grammy Awards. In 2016, Cage the Elephant won the Grammy Award for Best Rock Album for Tell Me I'm Pretty, winning again in 2019 for Social Cues. In 2025 the band's song "Neon Pill" was nominated for best Alternative Music Performance at the 67th annual Grammys.
