= Future Deep =

2017 album by Juliette Lewis

EP by Juliette Lewis
- Released: September 22, 2017
- Recorded: October 18, 2016
- Genres: Pop; pop rock; alternative rock
- Length: 24:44
- Label: Juliette Lewis
- Producers: Cage the Elephant, Isabella Summers

Juliette Lewis chronology
Terra Incognita (2009)	Future Deep (2017)

Future Deep is Juliette Lewis's first non-single release since the 2009 album Terra Incognita. The EP is co-written and co-produced by Lewis along with Isabella Summers of Florence and the Machine, Brad Shultz, Jared Champion and Matthan Minster from Cage the Elephant.

Future Deep could be considered a culmination of everything Lewis has been doing musically over a seven-year period (2009-2016). "Any Way You Want" was previously released as a single in September 2016. The same is true of the EP's fifth track, "Hello Hero", which was released in April 2016. Lewis added five new songs.

== Track listing ==
No.	Title	Length
1.	"Any Way You Want"	3:00
2.	"Losing My Mind"	3:02
3.	"I Know Trouble"	4:59
4.	"Future Deep"	2:42
5.	"Hello Hero"	3:22
6.	"Mean Machine"	2:32
7.	"Ode to Hollywood"	5:07

== Personnel ==
- Juliette Lewis - vocals
- Isabella Summers - producing (5 to 7), keyboards (5 to 7)
- Brad Shultz - producing (1 to 4), guitar (1 to 4)
- Matthan Minster - bass, keyboards, vocals, percussion (tracks: 1 to 4)
- Denny Weston - drums (tracks: 5 to 7)
- Jared Champion - drums (tracks: 1 to 4)
- Chris Wonzer - engineer (tracks: 5 to 7)
- Jason Hall - engineer, mixing (tracks: 1 to 4)
- James Walbourne - guitar (tracks: 7)
- Ron McElroy - guitar (tracks: 6)
- Todd Morse - guitar (tracks: 5)
- Ali Helnwein - strings (tracks: 7)
- Paul Ill - bass (tracks: 5 to 7)
- Jason LaRocca - mastering
