= List of awards and nominations received by Juliette Lewis =

Juliette Lewis awards and nominations
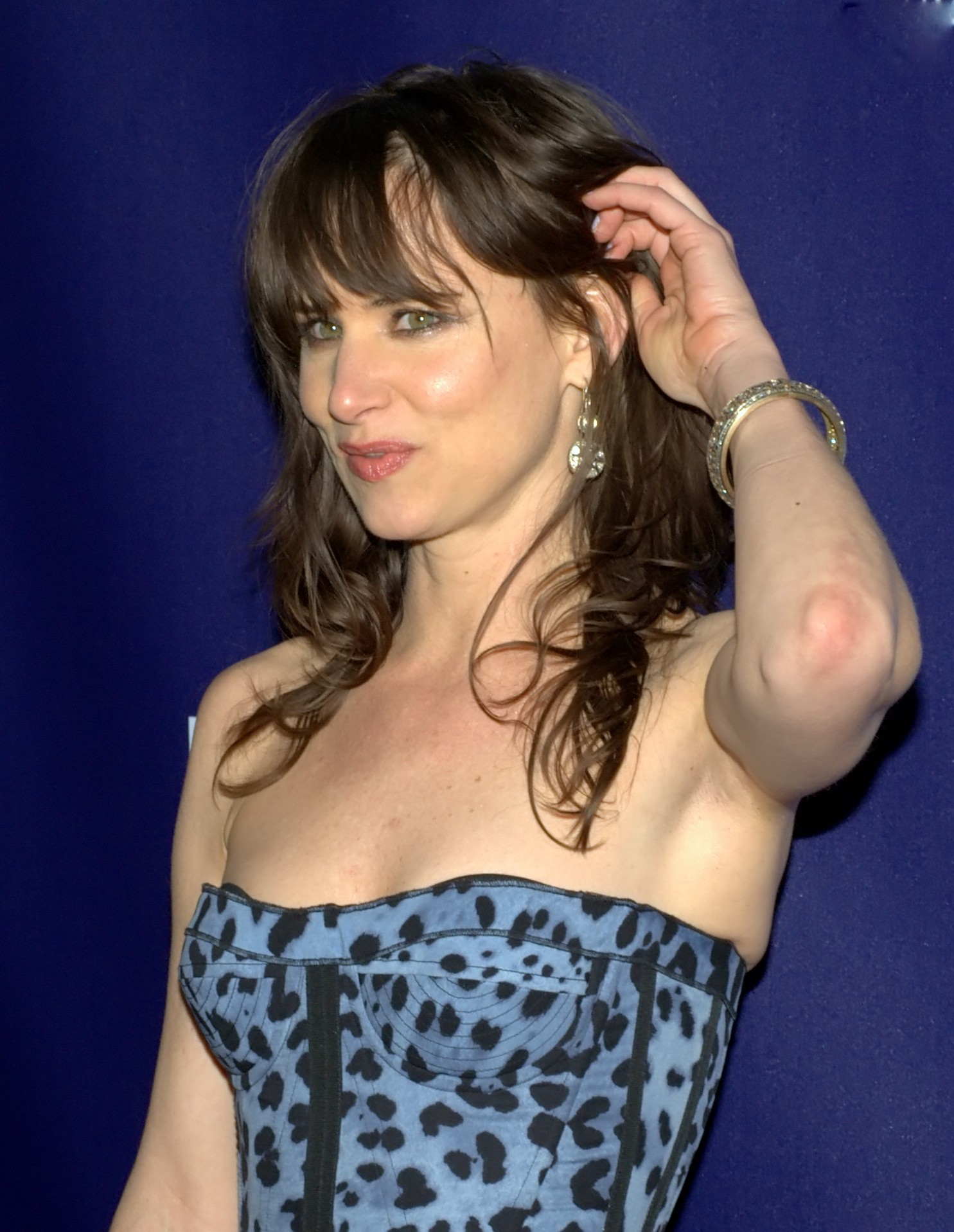
- Lewis in 2010
Awards and nominations
Award	Wins	Nominations
Academy Awards	0	1
Emmy Awards	0	3
Golden Globe Awards	0	1
Screen Actors Guild Awards	0	1

Totals (Note: Certain award groups do not simply award one winner. They acknowledge several different recipients, have runners-up, and have third place. Since this is a specific recognition and is different from losing an award, runner-up mentions are considered wins in this award tally. For simplification and to avoid errors, each award in this list has been presumed to have had a prior nomination.)
- Wins: 12
- Nominations: 57

Juliette Lewis is an American film actress who has received numerous nominations and awards throughout her career. Over her career she has worked with filmmakers such as Martin Scorsese, Woody Allen, Oliver Stone, Lasse Hallström, Nora Ephron, and Kathryn Bigelow and has received nominations for an Academy Award, three Emmy Awards, a Golden Globe Award, and a Screen Actors Guild Award.

Her acting career began in 1987, when she first received critical recognition for her role on the television series I Married Dora (1987–1988), for which she was nominated for a Young Artist Award for Best Actress. Lewis subsequently garnered significant acclaim for her performance as a rebellious teenager in Martin Scorsese's neo-noir psychological thriller Cape Fear (1991), for which she was nominated for an Academy Award for Best Supporting Actress, a Golden Globe Award for Best Supporting Actress, and recognition from the Chicago Film Critics Association, the National Society of Film Critics, and the New York Film Critics Circle. She subsequently won the Pastinetti Award for Best Actress at the Venice Film Festival for her performance as a woman in love with a mass murderer in Oliver Stone's romantic crime satire Natural Born Killers (1994).

In 2002, Lewis played a single mother in 1980s New Jersey in the HBO television film Hysterical Blindness for which she was nominated for the Primetime Emmy Award for Outstanding Lead Actress in a Miniseries or a Movie and the Independent Spirit Award for Best Supporting Female. In 2013, she acted in the family drama August: Osage County for which she was nominated for the Screen Actors Guild Award for Outstanding Performance by a Cast in a Motion Picture. In 2022, she played Denise Coughlan, a vibrant and eccentric costume designer in the Hulu limited series Welcome to Chippendales for which she was nominated for the Primetime Emmy Award for Outstanding Supporting Actress in a Limited or Anthology Series or Movie. From 2021 to 2023, she portrayed Natalie "Nat" Scatorccio in the Showtime thriller series Yellowjackets, where she earned nominations for the Hollywood Critics Association Award and Astra TV Award for Best Supporting Actress in a Drama Series.

== Major associations ==
=== Academy Awards ===
Year	Category	Nominated work	Result	Ref.
1991	Best Supporting Actress	Cape Fear	Nominated	

=== Emmy Awards ===
Year	Category	Nominated work	Result	Ref.
2003	Outstanding Supporting Actress in a Miniseries or a Movie	Hysterical Blindness	Nominated	
2023	Outstanding Supporting Actress in a Limited or Anthology Series or Movie	Welcome to Chippendales	Nominated	
Daytime Emmy Award
2001	Outstanding Performer in a Children's Special	My Louisiana Sky	Nominated	

=== Golden Globe Awards ===
Year	Category	Nominated work	Result	Ref.
1992	Best Supporting Actress – Motion Picture	Cape Fear	Nominated	

=== Screen Actors Guild Awards ===
Year	Category	Nominated work	Result	Ref.
2013	Outstanding Cast in a Motion Picture	August: Osage County	Nominated	

== Miscellaneous awards ==
Organizations	Year	Category	Work	Result	Ref.
Astra TV Awards	2024	Best Actress in a Broadcast Network or Cable Drama Series	Yellowjackets	Nominated	
Blockbuster Entertainment Awards	1996	Best Supporting Actress – Drama	The Evening Star	Won	
Blockbuster Entertainment Awards	1996	Best Supporting Actress – Adventure	From Dusk till Dawn	Nominated	
Golden Nymph Awards	2012	Outstanding Actress in a Drama Series	The Firm	Nominated	
Golden Raspberry Awards	2000	Worst Supporting Actress	The Other Sister	Nominated	
Hollywood Film Awards	2014	Best Ensemble	August: Osage County	Won	
Hollywood Critics Association TV Awards	2022	Best Actress in a Broadcast Network or Cable Series, Drama	Yellowjackets	Nominated	
Independent Spirit Awards	2002	Best Supporting Female	Hysterical Blindnesss	Nominated	
MTV Movie Awards	1992	Best Kiss (with Robert De Niro)	Cape Fear	Nominated	
MTV Movie Awards	1995	Best Kiss (with Woody Harrelson)	Natural Born Killers	Nominated	
MTV Movie Awards	1995	Best On-Screen Duo (with Woody Harrelson)	Natural Born Killers	Nominated	
Saturn Awards	1996	Best Supporting Actress	From Dusk till Dawn	Nominated	
Venice Film Festival	1994	Pasinetti Award for Best Actress	Natural Born Killers	Won	
Young Artist Award	1988	Best Actress – New Television Comedy Series	I Married Dora	Nominated	

== Critics associations ==
Organizations	Year	Category	Work	Result	Ref.
Chicago Film Critics Association	1992	Most Promising Actress	Cape Fear	Won	
Chicago Film Critics Association	1992	Best Supporting Actress	Cape Fear	Nominated	
Kansas City Film Critics Circle	1992	Best Supporting Actress	Cape Fear	Won	
National Society of Film Critics	1992	Best Supporting Actress	Cape Fear	2nd place	
New York Film Critics Circle	1992	Best Supporting Actress	Cape Fear	2nd place	
Boston Society of Film Critics	2010	Best Supporting Actress	Conviction	Won	
Hollywood Critics Association TV Awards	2023	Best Actress in a Broadcast Network or Cable Drama Series	Yellowjackets	Nominated	
