= Emilio Cueto =

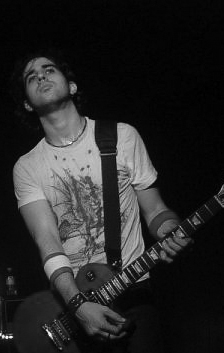

Background information
- Born: Emilio Raul Cueto; September 10, 1977 (age 48); Miami, Florida, United States
- Genres: Alternative rock, Latin
- Instruments: Guitar, Vocals
- Years active: 1999 - present
- Labels: Hollywood Records, The Militia Group,
- Website: Official

Emilio Raul Cueto (born September 10, 1977) is a guitarist who has played in the rock bands Rama Duke and Juliette and the Licks.

== Biography ==
=== Early life ===
Cueto was born in Miami, Florida on September 10, 1977. He has one brother, Mathew, and two sisters, Irene and Gabriella. He began playing the guitar at age 11 and got his start professionally at the age of 21. As a guitarist, Cueto's influences are extremely broad ranging from Eddie Van Halen and Scott Henderson to Al Di Meola and Benny Moré.

=== Career ===
Cueto's professional career began in June 1999 when he began working as a musician for The Walt Disney Company. Since then Emilio has performed with many of the most talented and respected Latin artists in the world, with televised performances being broadcast both nationally and internationally. Among these artists have been La India, Sheila E., Julio Iglesias Jr. and Obie Bermúdez.

Cueto moved to Los Angeles, California in February 2006 to perform with Hollywood Records recording artist Rama Duke. Since his relocation, he has also starred in 2 independent films, Razor and 87 as well as national commercials for BBC America and Comcast. In August 2007, Cueto joined the rock act Juliette and the Licks to complete their world tour running through October 2008. During this time he performed at the MTV Music Awards Australia, MTV Music Awards Brasil as well as The Late Late Show with Craig Ferguson in the United States.

Cueto has been endorsed by the Ernie Ball/Music Man since 2001.

In 2012, Cueto co-founded LiveNinja, a modern communications company helping brands better serve their customers. LiveNinja was acquired in 2017 by Net2Phone, a subsidiary of IDT Corp. for an undisclosed amount.

=== Personal life ===
Born of Cuban parents, Cueto grew up and still has family in Miami, Florida, where he currently resides.
