= Juliette Lewis =

American actress and singer (born 1973)

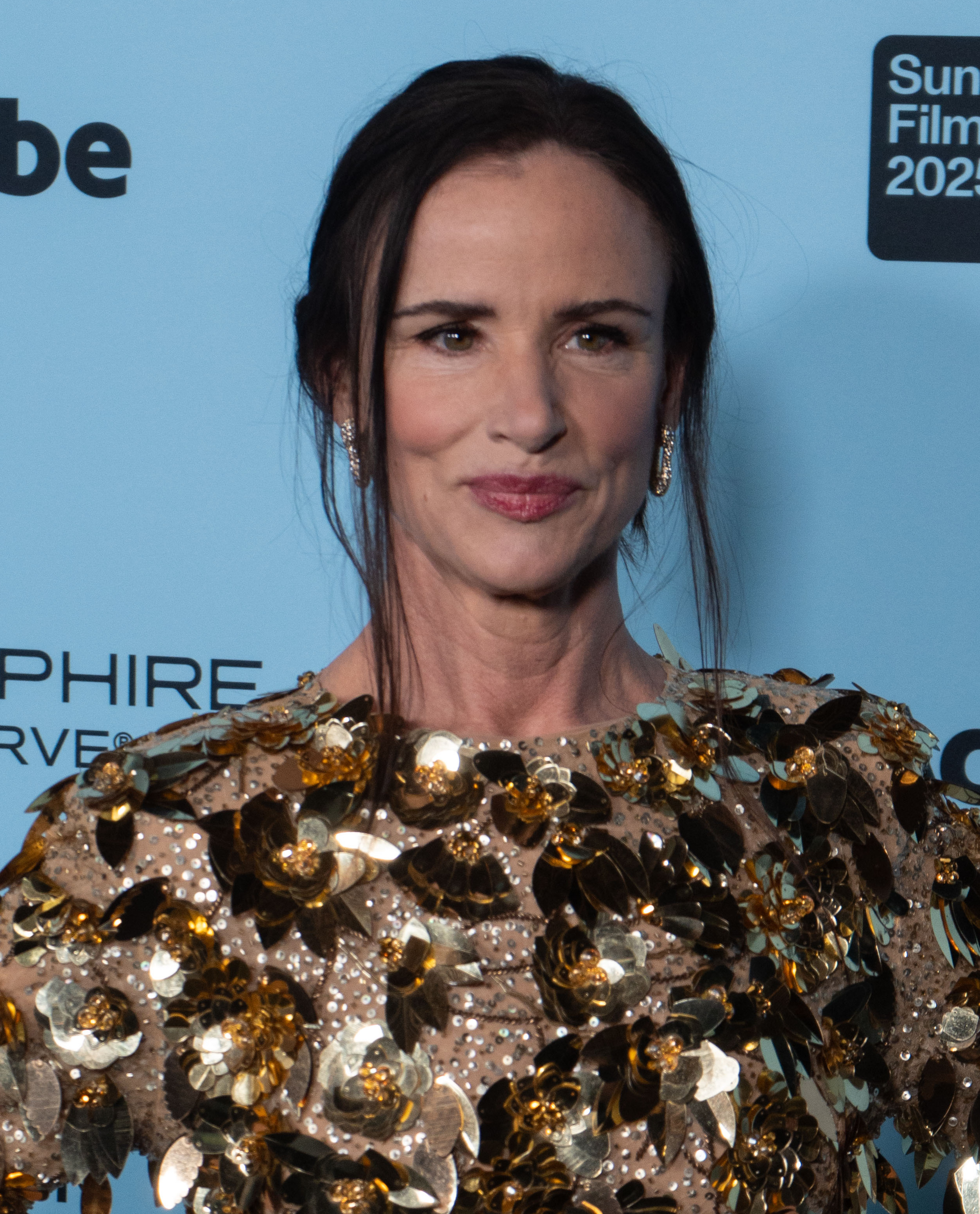
- Lewis in 2025
- Born: Juliette Lake Lewis; June 21, 1973 (age 53); Los Angeles, California, U.S.
- Occupations: Actress; singer; songwriter; record producer
- Years active: 1980–present
- Spouse: Steve Berra (m. 1999; div. 2003)
- Father: Geoffrey Lewis
- Awards: Full list
- Musical career
- Genre: Alternative rock
- Instrument: Vocals
- Labels: Fiddler; Hassle; The Militia Group; The End
- Formerly of: Juliette and the Licks

Juliette Lake Lewis (born June 21, 1973) is an American actress, singer, and musician. She is known for her portrayals of offbeat characters, often in films with dark plots, themes, and settings. Lewis gained prominence in American cinema during the early 1990s, appearing in various independent and arthouse films. Lewis's accolades include nominations for an Academy Award, a Golden Globe Award, and two Primetime Emmy Awards.

The daughter of actor Geoffrey Lewis, Lewis began her career in television at age 14 before making her film debut in My Stepmother Is an Alien (1988). This was followed by bigger parts in National Lampoon's Christmas Vacation (1989) and Martin Scorsese's Cape Fear (1991), the latter of which earned her an Oscar nomination for Best Supporting Actress. Subsequent credits included Husbands and Wives (1992), Kalifornia, What's Eating Gilbert Grape (both 1993), Natural Born Killers (1994), Strange Days (1995) and From Dusk till Dawn (1996).

Lewis received an Emmy Award nomination for the television film Hysterical Blindness (2002), and went on to co-star in the mainstream features Enough (2002), Cold Creek Manor, Old School (both 2003) and Starsky & Hutch (2004). She embarked on a musical career in 2003, forming the rock band Juliette and the Licks. Since 2009, she has been releasing material as a solo artist. Her film credits during the 2010s included Conviction (2010), The Switch (2010), August: Osage County (2013) and Ma (2019). Lewis has worked more frequently in television since the mid-2010s, appearing in major roles on series such as Wayward Pines (2015), Secrets and Lies (2015–2016), Queer as Folk, Welcome to Chippendales (both 2022) and Yellowjackets (2021–2023). She has since returned to film, appearing in The Thicket (2024), By Design (2025), Opus (2025), Over Your Dead Body (2026), and Dreamquil (2026).

== Early life ==
Juliette Lake Lewis was born June 21, 1973, in Los Angeles to actor Geoffrey Lewis and his first wife, Glenis (née Duggan) Batley, a graphic designer. She has eight siblings, which include a step-sister.

Lewis's parents divorced when she was two years old, and she spent her childhood living between both their homes in the Los Angeles area. She also lived for a brief period with actress Karen Black, who was a mentor to her. Lewis dropped out of high school at age 15.

== Career ==
=== 1987–1999: Early career and success ===
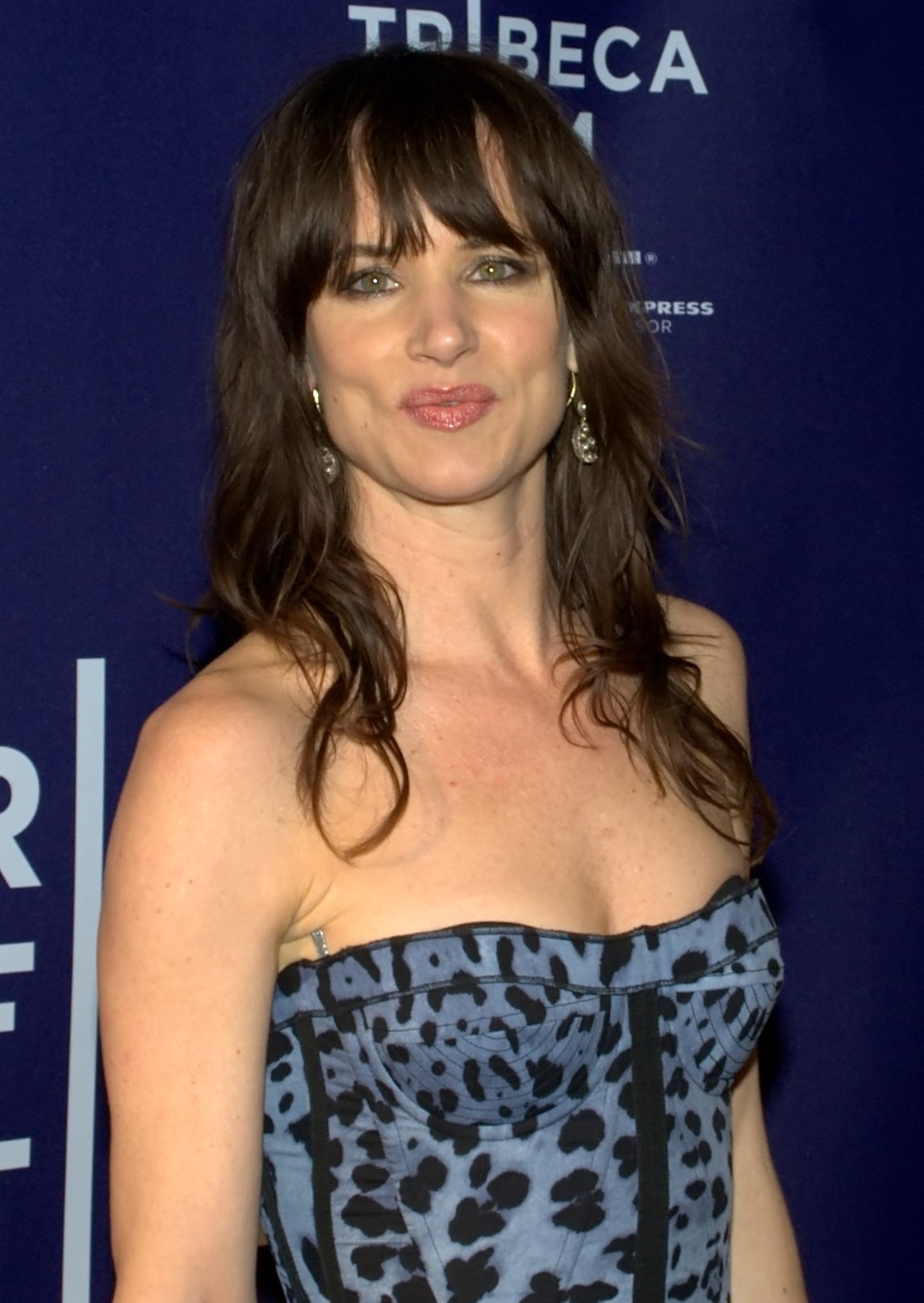
Lewis in 2010

Following an uncredited role in Bronco Billy (1980), Lewis made her first major screen appearance in the television film Home Fires (1987). Howard Rosenberg of the Los Angeles Times praised her performance in the latter, writing that she "lights up the screen". She then starred as Kate Farrell on the ABC sitcom I Married Dora, which ran between 1987 and 1988. At age 14, she was legally emancipated from her parents—with their approval—enabling her to work more freely. She later recalled, "I know that sounds all radical, but when you start acting when you're younger, you talk to other actor kids and their moms, and they're like, 'Yeah, if you want to get a job, they like [your] resume to say emancipated minor versus minor, because you then can work [longer hours]'".

Lewis had a minor part in the science fiction comedy My Stepmother Is an Alien (1988)—playing Lexie, the best friend of main character Jessie—before landing her first major supporting role as Audrey Griswold in National Lampoon's Christmas Vacation (1989), which is now regarded as a "classic" in its genre. Regarding her involvement with the film and the opportunity to work with co-star Chevy Chase, Lewis later reflected, "even at [age] 15, I knew it was a big deal". She followed this with appearances in the comedies Meet the Hollowheads and The Runnin' Kind, as well as a guest-starring role as Delores on the coming-of-age drama series The Wonder Years (all 1989).

In 1990, Lewis co-starred with Brad Pitt, whom she would go on to date for four years, in the Lifetime television film Too Young to Die?, a crime drama based loosely on the case of Attina Marie Cannaday. Lewis played Amanda, a troubled teenager who falls into a world of prostitution and drugs. In his review for the Los Angeles Times, Ray Loynd felt that the film worked due to its "compelling script [and Lewis'] authentic portrayal of the young and abused murderess whose first question to her public defender [is] whether he has any sugar-coated candies".

Lewis garnered international attention when she beat out 500 other actresses to play Danielle Bowden, the daughter of a family targeted by psychopathic criminal Max Cady, in Martin Scorsese's 1991 remake of Cape Fear (1962). Vincent Canby of The New York Times lauded her performance, calling her "a new young actress of stunning possibilities", while The Hollywood Reporter's Duane Byrge commented, "Perhaps providing the strongest real counterbalance to De Niro's crazy Cady is Juliette Lewis, whose [performance] shows the most sinewy fiber". She went on to receive Golden Globe and Academy Award nominations for the role. Retrospectively, the sequence in which her character is seduced by Cady was named one of the most unforgettable scenes in film history by Entertainment Weekly and Complex. On working with Scorsese, Lewis has since said, "I liken that period of time to being anointed, or getting my creative wings ... [the experience] changed me [and] gave me a confidence ... It wasn't [about] the outside accolades. It was [Scorsese] nurturing my ingredients as a performer".

In 1992, Lewis had a supporting role in Woody Allen's Husbands and Wives, with Rita Kempley of The Washington Post describing her portrayal of Rain—a "Lolita"-esque college student—as "sumptuous". She headlined the romantic drama That Night the same year, a coming-of-age story set in the 1960s. Lewis appeared in several films in 1993, including Peter Medak's neo-noir thriller Romeo Is Bleeding, where she played the mistress of a corrupt cop. She then reunited with Brad Pitt in Kalifornia, co-starring as the girlfriend of a serial killer. Critic Roger Ebert deemed Lewis's portrayal of the childlike Adele one of "the most harrowing and convincing performances I've ever seen". At the time of filming Kalifornia, Lewis and Pitt had been in a relationship since 1990, though they separated the year of its release. Next, she appeared as a psychiatric patient in the music video for Melissa Etheridge's "Come to My Window", and starred in the Lasse Hallström-directed What's Eating Gilbert Grape (also 1993), playing Becky, a free-spirited drifter who befriends a young man and his disabled brother in a small Midwestern town.

Lewis received the Pasinetti Award for Best Actress at the 1994 Venice Film Festival for her portrayal of Mallory Knox, a murderous woman who embarks on a killing spree with her psychotic lover, in Oliver Stone's satiric, controversial crime film Natural Born Killers. Though criticized for its excessive violence and influencing of copycat crimes, with Lewis later admitting that playing a woman who displays such "volatility and repulsive behavior" had had a detrimental effect on her career, her performance in Killers was roundly praised, with Rolling Stone's Peter Travers deeming it "sensational":

Mickey and Mallory are a Bonnie and Clyde for the '90s, Stone's '90s; they're damaged goods—haunted, horny and out for blood. Harrelson and Lewis ... play the dysfunctional hell out of them ... Women don't [usually] dominate Stone films [but] Lewis towers over Killers, finding the wildcat and the bruised child in Mallory.

Lewis had a supporting role that same year in Nora Ephron's Christmas-themed black comedy Mixed Nuts. She then starred as rock singer Faith Justin in Kathryn Bigelow's experimental science-fiction film Strange Days (1995), doing her own singing on covers of two songs written by PJ Harvey. Though a box-office failure, Days went on to develop a cult following in later years. Next, Lewis made a "massively disturbing" appearance as a heroin addict in The Basketball Diaries (also 1995), a crime drama based on Jim Carroll's memoir of the same name.

In 1996, Lewis had supporting roles in comedy-drama The Evening Star—a sequel to Terms of Endearment (1983)—and the Quentin Tarantino/Robert Rodriguez action horror film From Dusk till Dawn. Writing for The New York Times, Janet Maslin pointed out that the role of "clean-living ingenue" Kate Fuller in Dawn was an ironic departure for Lewis. She next appeared in the romantic comedy Some Girl (1998), followed by The Other Sister (1999), in which she portrayed a woman with an intellectual disability attempting to achieve independence. The film received largely unfavorable reviews, though Stephen Holden of The New York Times felt that it was "beautifully acted", noting, "Carla is played by Ms. Lewis with enormous heart and sensitivity, and with body language so precise that you soon forget it is a performance". Lewis later admitted to having been "scared" by the challenge of portraying somebody with a neurological disorder, saying that it was "the hardest role I have ever had to play".

=== 2000–2010: Film, television and music ===
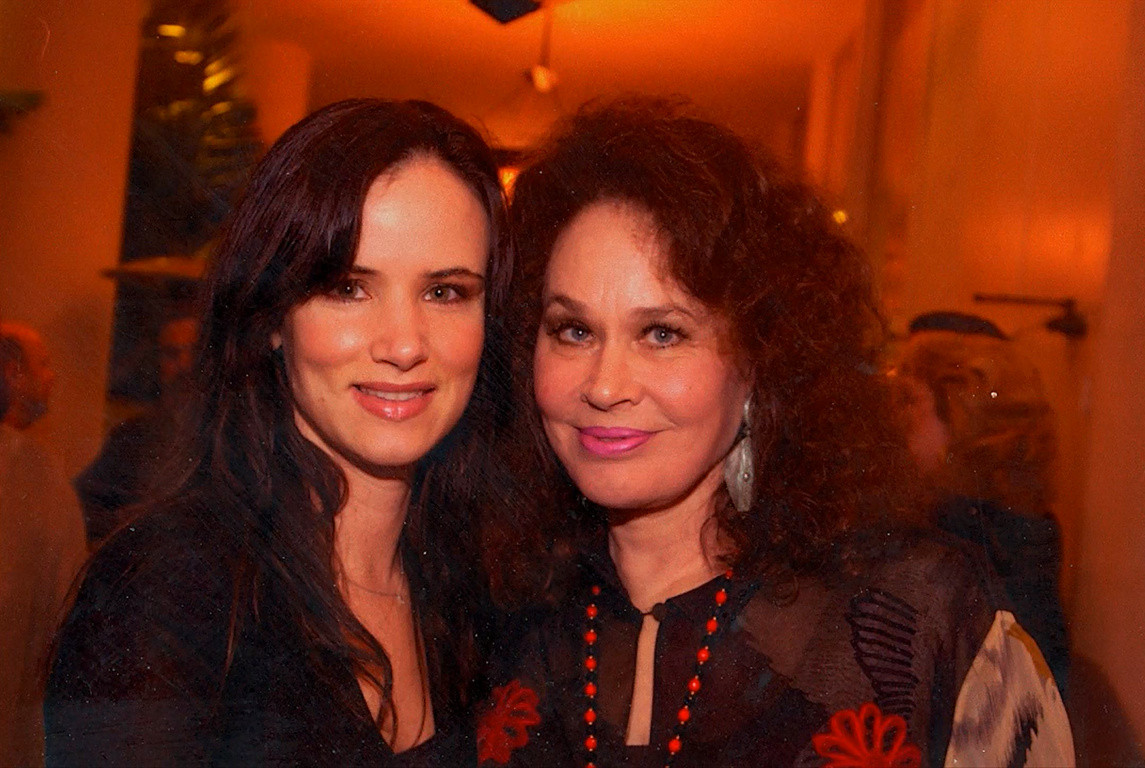
Lewis with Karen Black, circa 2004

Lewis received praise for her performance in The Way of the Gun (2000), the directorial debut of Christopher McQuarrie. Writing for The Austin Chronicle, Marjorie Baumgarten felt her portrayal of pregnant kidnap victim Robin was imbued "with rich veins of honesty and truth". That same year, she provided vocals for the track "Bad Brother" by Infidels, which featured on the soundtrack to The Crow: Salvation. She then headlined the neo-noir crime film Picture Claire (2001), followed by a supporting role in the independent lesbian-themed comedy Gaudi Afternoon (2001). The latter received unfavorable reviews, with A. O. Scott of The New York Times writing that Lewis and co-star Lili Taylor "overact like second-string sketch performers on Saturday Night Live". Next, she played the concerned best friend of a woman trapped in a violent relationship in Enough (2002), a big-budget thriller directed by Michael Apted.

Lewis received Emmy and Independent Spirit Award nominations for her performance in the 2002 television film Hysterical Blindness, where she co-starred as the friend of a woman in 1980s New Jersey who receives an unfortunate diagnosis. She then appeared in the poorly received Cold Creek Manor (2003), a thriller directed by Mike Figgis, playing the battered "white-trash" girlfriend of an unstable villain. Next, she featured in the music video for HIM's "Buried Alive By Love" and played the supporting role of Heidi in Todd Phillips's 2003 comedy Old School.

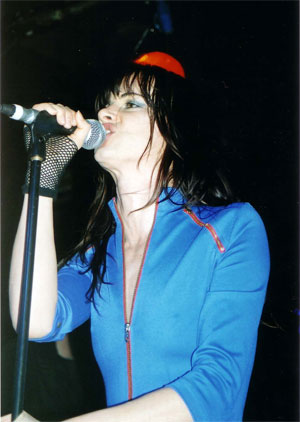
Lewis performing with Juliette and the Licks in London, 2005

Beginning in 2003, Lewis embarked on a musical career, forming the rock band Juliette and the Licks with former Hole drummer Patty Schemel. The band released their debut EP, ...Like a Bolt of Lightning, in late 2004 through Fiddler Records. That same year, she featured as a guest vocalist on The Prodigy's album Always Outnumbered, Never Outgunned, played the supporting role of Kitty in the big-budget action comedy Starsky & Hutch, and headlined Blueberry, a French acid Western directed by Jan Kounen. She subsequently starred in comedy-drama Daltry Calhoun (2005), playing the girlfriend of a Tennessee entrepreneur, and in the romantic drama Aurora Borealis (also 2005), playing the live-in assistant of an elderly couple. In May 2005, Juliette and the Licks released their debut studio album, You're Speaking My Language. The band toured internationally in support of the album, receiving a favorable concert review from The Guardian's David Peschek, who wrote that Lewis is "exactly the kind of iconic presence that boringly boy-saturated rock needs".

Lewis had supporting parts in two comedies released in 2006: The Darwin Awards and Catch and Release. Around the same time, Juliette and the Licks recorded their second studio album—Four on the Floor—which was released in 2007. Lewis appeared in Rockstar Games' Grand Theft Auto IV the following year, providing the voice of "Juliette", the host of fictional radio station Radio Broker. Next, she played a key role in Drew Barrymore's directorial debut, the 2009 comedy-drama Whip It!, and provided voice work for the animated science fiction film Metropia (also 2009), directed by Tarik Saleh. Describing her portrayal of an aggressive roller derby captain in Whip It, The Guardian commented that Lewis was "all grimy attitude and slinky rock-chick insouciance". She released her first solo studio album that same year, titled Terra Incognita, through The End Records.

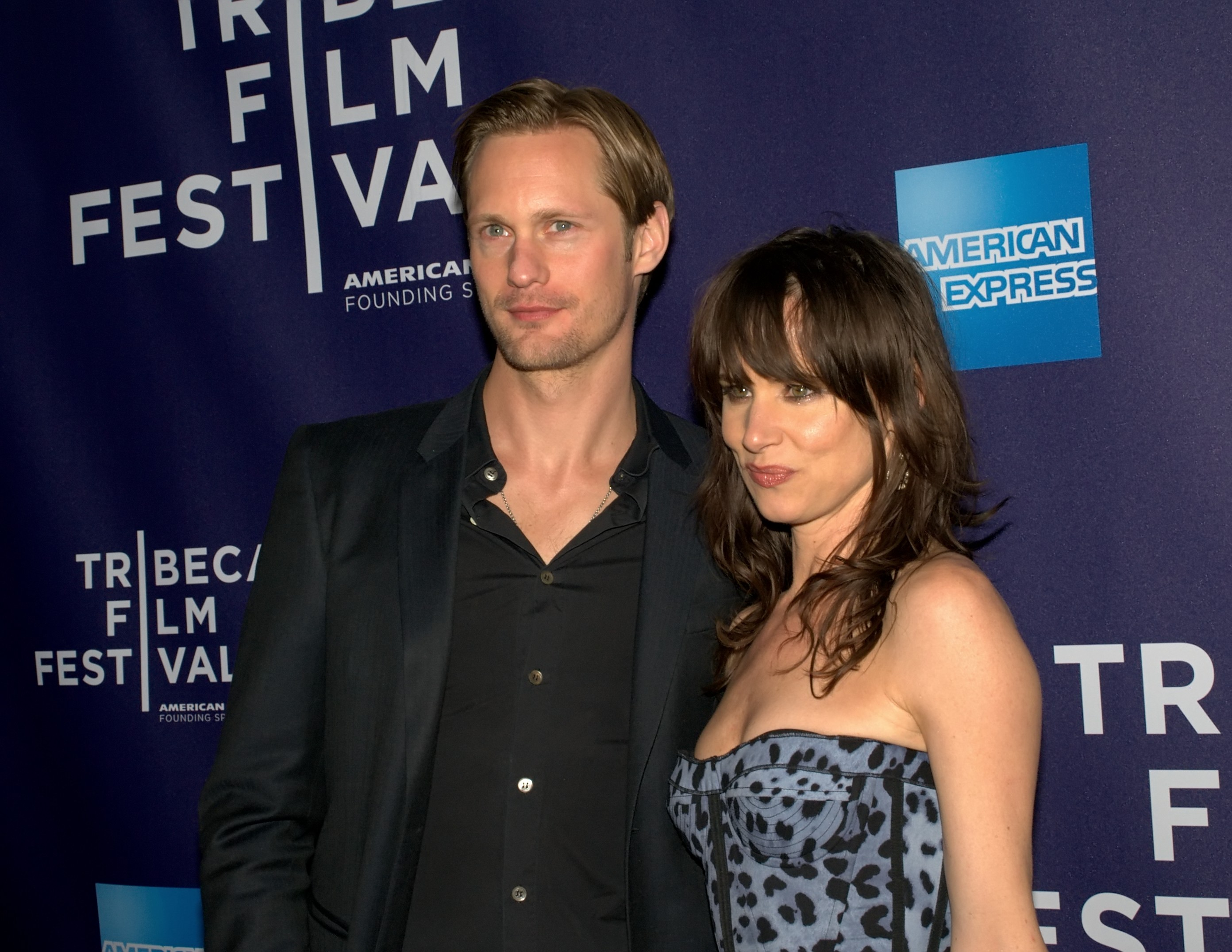
Lewis with Alexander Skarsgard at the 2010 Tribeca Film Festival

In 2010, Lewis starred in a number of films, first appearing in Mark Ruffalo's directorial debut Sympathy for Delicious, followed by romantic comedy The Switch, in which she appeared as the best friend of a woman trying to conceive a child through artificial insemination. She also portrayed a murder witness in the biographical crime drama Conviction, with The Wall Street Journal calling her a "scene-stealer", and the Boston Society of Film Critics awarding her Best Supporting Actress. She reprised the role of Heidi—her character in Old School—that same year in the black comedy Due Date.

=== 2011–present: Television and film roles ===
Lewis's first film of 2011 was the independent drama Hick, in which she starred as the alcoholic mother of a young girl in 1980s Nebraska. She subsequently had a minor role in the Canadian drama Foreverland, followed by the 2012 thriller Open Road and the short-lived NBC legal drama series The Firm, on which she co-starred as secretary Tammy Hemphill. Next, Lewis had a central role in August: Osage County (2013), playing one of several sisters who reunite with their dysfunctional mother in the wake of their father's suicide. A tragicomedy based on the Tracy Letts play of the same name, the film was met with mixed reviews, but critics singled out Lewis as one of its strengths, with SFGate's Mick LaSalle feeling that her portrayal of youngest sibling Karen was the only performance to have "a complete grasp of the material's proper tone". Osage was a box-office success, grossing over $74 million worldwide.

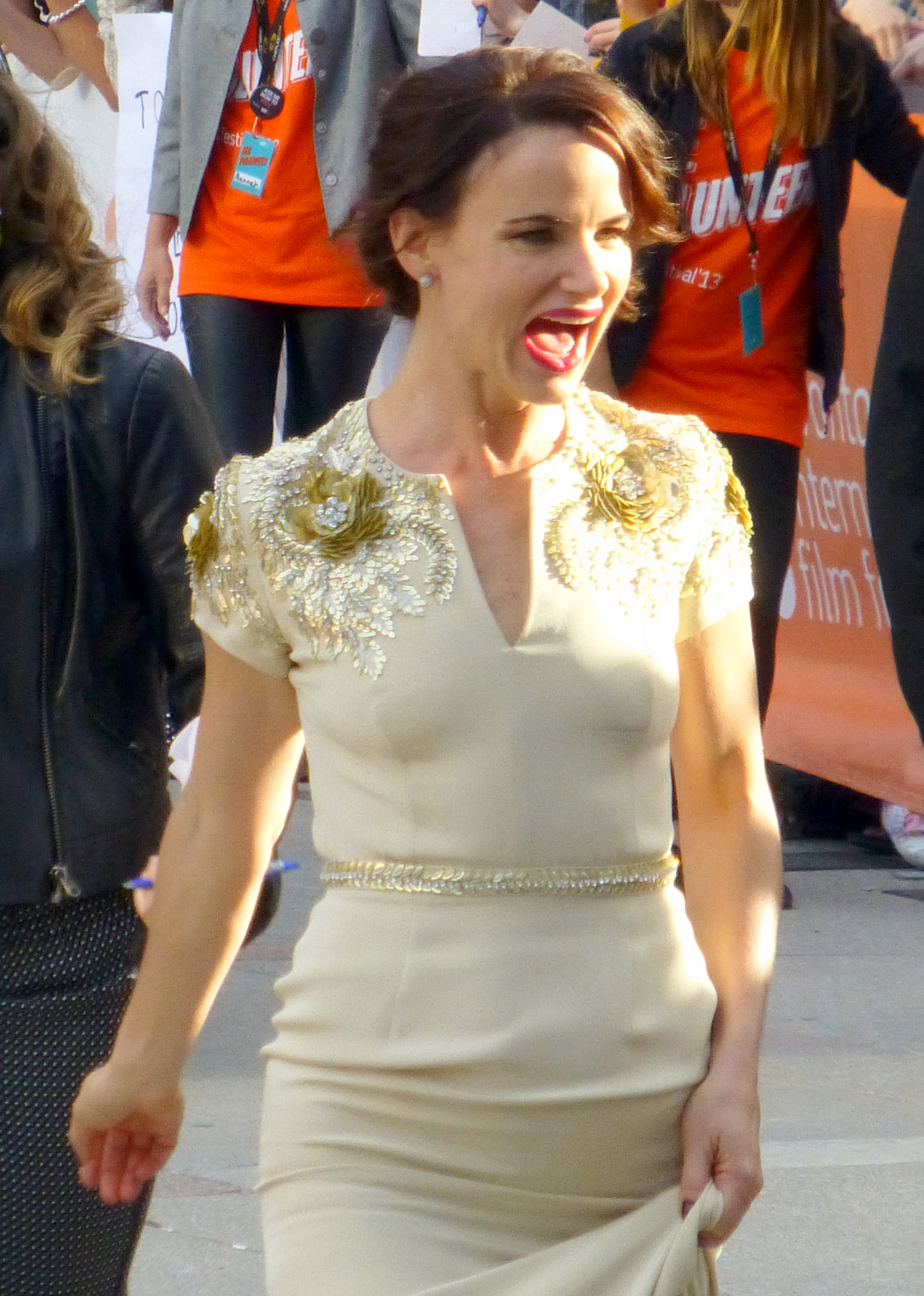
Lewis at the 2013 Toronto International Film Festival

Lewis was involved in musical projects in 2013, providing backing vocals on Joseph Arthur's album The Ballad of Boogie Christ and appearing in the music video for "City of Angels" by Thirty Seconds to Mars. Her next film roles were the 2014 independent features Hellion, for which she received positive notices, and Kelly & Cal, where she starred as a punk rocker-turned-suburban housewife. Her portrayal of Kelly in the latter was particularly well received, with The New York Times commenting that it "crackle[s] with authenticity", adding:

The distance between riot grrrl and suburban mom is quite a stretch. But as middle age approaches, time has a way of landing mouthy young rebels in roles they never expected to inhabit. Take Juliette Lewis, the personification of scary defiance [in] Natural Born Killers ... In Kelly & Cal, [she] conveys the excruciating discomfort of a slightly crumpled former upstart struggling to adapt to a staid, middle-class existence. That means reining in the anarchic impulses of her youth and tolerating polite, buttoned-up in-laws.

Lewis's next role was in Jem and the Holograms (2015), an adaptation of the 1980s animated series Jem, where she played a music producer. The film was a financial disappointment for Universal and received a largely negative response from critics. She followed this with a starring role as a small-town detective on the ABC crime drama series Secrets and Lies, which ran for two seasons. The show received a mixed reception, with Neil Genzlinger commenting in his review for The New York Times, "Ms. Lewis's dour detective character, Andrea Cornell, is a cliché stretched beyond the point of believability". Next, she had a recurring guest role on the first season of the science fiction mystery series Wayward Pines (2015), contributed vocals to the song "Stickup" by Karma Fields and Morten, and played the mother of a high schooler in techno-thriller Nerve (2016).

In November 2016, the independently released EP Future Deep marked Lewis's first solo musical project in seven years. She guest-starred as Bailey Todd on the second season of Epix's Graves the following year, and subsequently appeared as a fun-loving reiki healer on the HBO comedy series Camping (2018), a remake of the British show of the same name. Judy Berman of Time gave the latter an unfavorable review, writing that Lewis is "underutilized, as usual". She co-starred in the independent feature Back Roads that same year, a drama about a young man trapped by circumstance in rural Pennsylvania after his mother—Lewis—murders his father. Writing for The Hollywood Reporter, Frank Scheck said it offered "many powerful moments" and featured an "excellent" performance from Lewis. Next, she played a supporting role in Sam Taylor-Johnson's A Million Little Pieces, adapted from the book of the same name. In late 2018, Lewis was cast in the recurring role of Blue on the debut season of ABC's The Conners—a spin-off from Roseanne—where she appeared for three episodes.

In Tate Taylor's 2019 psychological horror film Ma, Lewis played the mother of a teenage girl who grows close to a disturbed woman in their neighborhood. The Blumhouse production was a box-office success, grossing over $60 million worldwide. Lewis reunited with Taylor for the same year's Breaking News in Yuba County, co-starring as Gloria Michaels, and appeared in the guest role of Kathy on Hulu's strongly reviewed crime series The Act, a drama based on the murder of Dee Dee Blanchard.

Lewis starred on the Showtime mystery thriller series Yellowjackets between November 2021 and May 2023, portraying Natalie Scatorccio, a plane crash survivor haunted by painful secrets. The show was received enthusiastically by critics, with The Guardian's Leila Latif calling Lewis "sublime", noting that "[she] stunningly performs the nuances of tentative empathy and glimmers of optimism within a deep chasm of grief". Of her involvement with the series, Lewis said, "I was so in fear of being typecast that I worried people wouldn't know what goes into a character like this. Natalie is nothing like myself. But because there's certain things, like 'tough' and 'wrong side of the tracks' or whatever, people think it's something I've played before, but I haven't. [It has taken] me like 30 years for people to go, 'Wow, she does unpredictable stuff, and it's high quality'". During that same period, Lewis appeared as Judy on Peacock's reboot of Queer as Folk (2022) and co-starred in the biographical Hulu miniseries Welcome to Chippendales (also 2022). Richard Roeper called the latter "colorful and shiny but increasingly dark and twisted" in his review for the Chicago Sun-Times, adding that Lewis's portrayal of forthright costume designer Denise Coughlan was "outstanding".

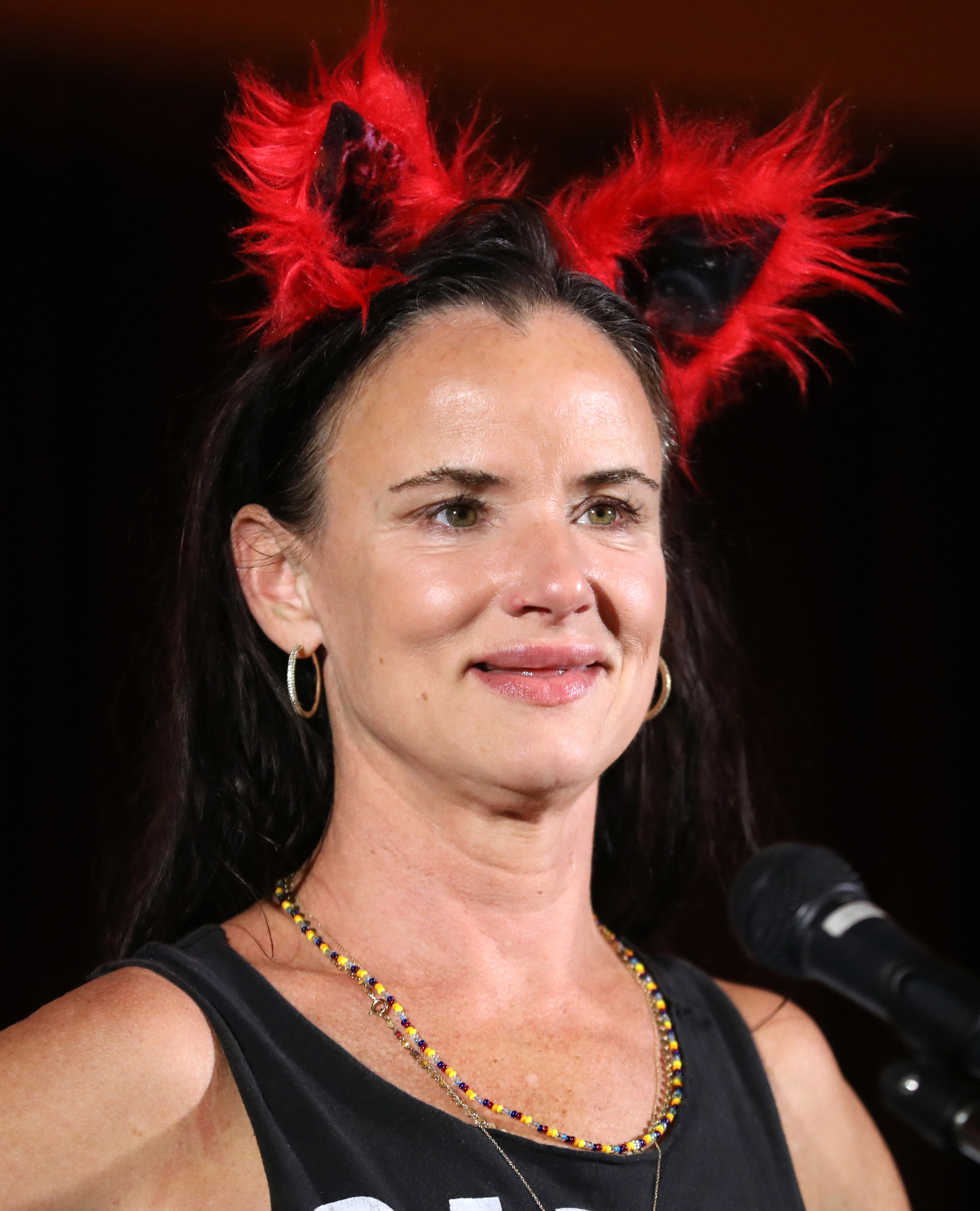
Lewis in 2024

In 2026, Lewis co-stars as Magenta in the Broadway revival of Richard O’Brien’s The Rocky Horror Show. This performance marks her Broadway debut.

== Personal life ==
In 1989, Lewis was arrested at age 16 for entering a bar unlawfully, later being charged with underage drinking.

Lewis was born into Scientology and started practicing it in the 1990s. She credited Scientology's Narconon program for helping her rehabilitate after a years-long addiction to cocaine and prescription medication in her early adult years. When asked in 2010 by Vanity Fair if she was a Scientologist, Lewis responded that she practiced Scientology but also identified as a Christian.

In an interview with Time in 2015, Lewis remarked about protecting her freedom of choice and religion, and being annoyed at people's misconceptions about Scientology: "Whatever people's conceptions are of me, I think it's cute. I roll with it". By 2021, she began to distance herself from Scientology, telling The New York Times and The Washington Post that she identifies as spiritual and does not identify as a Scientologist.

Lewis married professional skateboarder Steve Berra in September 1999. She filed for divorce in April 2003. Lewis described the divorce as "amicable", later commenting, "Steve would be the first to admit he was a workaholic. You have to be ready to have a partnership. And sometimes you're like, 'Whoa, this is too much. I only actually have enough steam to focus on my own thing'".

Lewis has supported Little Kids Rock, an American nonprofit organization that works to restore and revitalize music education in disadvantaged U.S. public schools, by painting a Fender Stratocaster guitar and donating it to an auction to raise money for the organization.

== Acting credits and accolades ==
Lewis is known for acting in films such as National Lampoon's Christmas Vacation (1989), Cape Fear (1991), Husbands and Wives (1992), What's Eating Gilbert Grape (1993), Natural Born Killers (1994), From Dusk till Dawn, The Evening Star (1996), The Other Sister (1999), Old School (2003), Conviction (2010), August: Osage County (2013) and Nerve (2016). On television, she began her career acting in the ABC sitcom I Married Dora (1987–1988). She later acted in the legal series The Firm (2012), the mystery series Secrets and Lies (2015–2016), the comedy series Camping (2018) and the miniseries I Know This Much Is True (2019). She earned acclaim for playing Natalie Scatorccio in the Showtime thriller series Yellowjackets from 2021 to 2023. She appeared in the shows I'm a Virgo (2023), It's Florida Man (2024), and Cape Fear (2026). She acted in the films The Thicket (2024), By Design (2025), Opus (2025), Over Your Dead Body (2026), and Dreamquil (2026).

Over her career Lewis has received nominations for an Academy Award, a Golden Globe Award, two Primetime Emmy Awards, a Daytime Emmy Award and a Screen Actors Guild Award. She earned a nomination for the Academy Award for Best Supporting Actress for playing a rebellious teenager in the Martin Scorsese thriller Cape Fear (1991). She was also nominated for a Primetime Emmy Award for Outstanding Supporting Actress in a Limited or Anthology Series or Movie for her role playing a flirty teenager in the HBO film Hysterical Blindness (2002) and as an outspoken costume designer in the Hulu miniseries Welcome to Chippendales (2022).

== Discography ==
=== Juliette and the Licks ===
Albums

- You're Speaking My Language (2005)
- Four on the Floor (2006)

EP

- ...Like a Bolt of Lightning (2004)

=== Juliette Lewis ===
Album

- Terra Incognita (2009)

EP

- Future Deep (2017)

Other appearances

- "Born Bad" (1994) from Natural Born Killers
- "Hardly Wait" (1995) PJ Harvey cover from Strange Days
- "Come Rain or Come Shine" (1999) from The Other Sister
- "Danny Boy Song" (2004) from Blueberry
- "Hotride", "Spitfire", "Get Up Get Off" (2004) from the Prodigy album Always Outnumbered, Never Outgunned
- "You'll Be Sorry" (2011) from the Boots Electric album Honkey Kong
- "Stickup" (2015) from the Karma Fields album New Age | Dark Age
- "Bad Brother" (2000) by The Infidels (feat. Juliette Lewis) from The Crow: Salvation – samples "Born Bad"
