= Terra Incognita (Juliette Lewis album) =

Studio album by Juliette Lewis
- Released: August 31, 2009
- Recorded: 2009
- Genre: Rock
- Length: 51:52
- Label: The End
- Producer: Omar Rodríguez-López

Juliette Lewis chronology
Four on the Floor (2006)	Terra Incognita (2009)	Future Deep (2017)

Terra Incognita is the debut full-length solo album by American singer Juliette Lewis, released in August 2009. Produced by Omar Rodríguez-López of The Mars Volta, it was her first album after parting with backing band the Licks, replaced by the New Romantiques. "‘Terra Incognita’ means unknown territory," she said, "and that’s where I wanted to go musically. The guitars are more wild and atmospheric. The groove is dark and deep and allows for a lot of sonic contrasts."

== Background ==
"There were a lot of breakups and pain and betrayal going on when I wrote the songs…" Lewis explained. "So that's what's up lyrically. Sound-wise, I just had a vision in my head of something more textured and richer than the straight-ahead rock from before." Of Rodríguez-López, she said, "We're both communicators, so we got along really well. And we had a lot of similar interests: film, art. We recorded at his place in Brooklyn, and also in Mexico."

== Track listing ==
	Song	Length
1	"Intro"	1:00
2	"Noche Sin Fin"	4:05
3	"Terra Incognita"	3:20
4	"Hard Lovin' Woman"	4:54
5	"Fantasy Bar"	4:03
6	"Romeo"	4:11
7	"Ghosts"	2:57
8	"All Is for God"	2:28
9	"Female Persecution"	5:45
10	"Uh Huh"	3:09
11	"Junkyard Heart"	4:54
12	"Suicide Dive Bombers"	4:54
13	"The Devil Knows (Bonus Track)"	3:29
14	"Gold & Mud (Bonus Track)"	3:43

== Reception ==
Professional ratings
Review scores
Source	Rating
Antiquiet	link
Metacritic	(56%) link

The album received mixed reviews, earning an average rating of 56%, based on seven reviews, on Metacritic. Simon Price of The Independent described it as a "frazzled and bluesy beast". Allmusic's Stephen Thomas Erlewine gave the album three stars out of five, stating that "her love for PJ [Harvey] and Patti [Smith] is still transparent", but it "still relies too heavily on awkward gutter poetry".

The A.V. Club gave the album a C+ rating, with Chris Mincher stating, "Lewis convincingly mixes guttural aggression and haunting sonic effects. However, the songwriting is mostly nonexistent." Hugh Montgomery of The Observer viewed the album as displaying "a more varied tone, ranging from the woozily psychedelic to the feverishly gothic, and melodies to match her raspingly alluring vocals." Rock Sound gave it 7/10 but called it "incoherent". Stephen Dalton of Uncut described it as "thick with atmosphere and variety", calling it "a rich, rowdy and mostly rewarding listen."

== Personnel ==
- Juliette Lewis - Lyrics, Music, Vocals, Organ (Rhodes)
- Omar Rodríguez-López - Producer, Guitar, Bass, Organ (Rhodes)
- Marcel Rodriguez-Lopez - Clavinet, Synthesizer, Percussion, Music (2, 3, 5 to 11)
- BC Coldwell - Album Design
- Thomas Pridgen - Drums
- Chris Watson - Guitar (1−3, 5 to 11), Music (2–6, 10, 11)
- Howie Weinberg - Mastering
- Rich Costey, Charlie Stavish (Assistant), Noah Goldstein (Assistant) - Mixing
- Jennifer Tzar - Photography (Album Photos)
- Hadas - Photography (Inside Photo With Omar)
- Isaiah Abolin, Joe Montanez, Lars Stalfors - Recording
