= You're Speaking My Language =

Studio album by Juliette and the Licks
- Released: May 17, 2005
- Recorded: 2005
- Genre: Garage punk Indie rock
- Length: 40:40
- Label: Hassle Records
- Producer: Juliette Lewis

Juliette and the Licks chronology
...Like a Bolt of Lightning (2004)	You're Speaking My Language (2005)	Four on the Floor (2006)

Professional ratings
Review scores
Source	Rating
Allmusic	3/5 stars

You're Speaking My Language is the first full-length album by Juliette and the Licks, released on May 17, 2005.

== Track listing ==
1. "Intro" – 0:23
2. "You're Speaking My Language" – 2:14
3. "Money in My Pocket" – 3:08
4. "American Boy, Vol. 2" – 3:47
5. "I Never Got to Tell You What I Wanted To" – 4:33
6. "This I Know" – 3:57
7. "Pray for the Band Latoya" – 2:49
8. "So Amazing" – 2:19
9. "By the Heat of Your Light" – 2:56
10. "Got Love to Kill (Remix)" – 3:42
11. "Seventh Sign" – 3:57
12. "Long Road Out of Here" – 6:39
13. "Shelter Your Needs" (Bonus track, only on Japanese release)
14. "Get Your Tongue Wet" (Bonus track, only on Japanese release)

Produced by Juliette and the Licks.
© 2005 Lake Enterprises under exclusive licence to Hassle Records.

== Single track listing ==
=== You're Speaking My Language (single) ===
1. "You're Speaking My Language"
2. "Hey You, Hey Man (B-Side)"
3. "Get Your Tongue Wet (B-Side)"

=== You're Speaking My Language (DVD single) ===
1. "You're Speaking My Language (Audio)"
2. "You're Speaking My Language (Video)"
3. "You're Speaking My Language (Video Outtakes)"
4. "You're Speaking My Language (Lyrics Sheet)"

=== Got Love to Kill (single) ===
1. "Got Love To Kill"
2. "I Never Got To Tell You What I Wanted To (XFM Radio Session)"
3. "Got Love To Kill (Virgin Radio Session)"
4. "Got Love To Kill (Remix)" Enhanced Video

== Personnel ==
- Juliette Lewis – vocals, design, layout design
- Todd Morse – guitarist
- Kemble Walters – guitarist
- Paul Ill – bass guitarist
- Jason Morris – drummer
- Jason Harris – engineer
- Jasmine Chang – administration
- Juliette and the Licks – producer
- Buck Snow – engineer, mixing assistant
- Jaymz Todd – design, layout design
- Shannon Turgeon – photo stylist
- Steve Churchyard – mixing
- Bernie Grundman – mastering
