= Too Young to Die? =

- Genre: Crime; Drama
- Written by: David Hill; George Rubino
- Directed by: Robert Markowitz
- Starring: Michael Tucker; Juliette Lewis; Brad Pitt; Alan Fudge
- Theme music composer: Charles Bernstein
- Country of origin: United States
- Original language: English

Production
- Executive producers: Robert M. Sertner; Frank von Zerneck
- Producers: Susan Weber-Gold; Julie Anne Weitz
- Production location: Taft, California
- Cinematography: Eric Van Haren Noman
- Editors: Harvey Rosenstock; Eric A. Sears
- Running time: 92 minutes
- Production companies: Frank & Bob Films II; Von Zerneck Sertner Films

Original release
- Network: NBC
- Release: February 26, 1990

Too Young to Die? is a 1990 television movie starring Brad Pitt and Juliette Lewis. It touches on the debate concerning the death penalty. It is based on a true story. Three years later, Pitt and Lewis would reunite, portraying somewhat similar characters, in Kalifornia.

== Plot ==
Juliette Lewis plays Amanda, age 15, a girl who has always been let down by all the adults around her. Her mother and stepfather abandon her after she tells her mother about the sexual abuse her stepfather has inflicted on her. After an unsuccessful marriage, she leaves town and falls prey to a hustler, Billy (Brad Pitt). He introduces Amanda to the world of drugs and strip clubs, abusing her and forcing her to give him part of her paychecks. After a chance encounter with a soldier, Mike (Michael O'Keefe), he offers Amanda a place to stay while she gets back on her feet. Even though she is still a child, Amanda and Mike begin a romantic relationship. After the relationship is revealed to his commanding officer, Mike breaks off the relationship, leaving Amanda back on the streets to fend for herself. Not long before Billy finds her and forces her to stay with him again. After a night of multiple drugs, Billy convinces Amanda to take revenge on Mike by killing him. The two break into Mike's house, where they kidnap Mike and his girlfriend. After taking them into out-of-town oilfields, Amanda, wielding Billy's knife, stabs Mike. Amanda is eventually arrested and tried as an adult, despite her young age. The prosecuting lawyer is relentless and convinces the jury to see her as an emblem of the new breed of youth, the evil young people who need to be given a warning. Despite the best efforts of Amanda's lawyer (Michael Tucker), who points out that it is society that let Amanda down and not only her choice that led her to this moment, the jury is unsympathetic and convicts Amanda of murder. Amanda is, thus, sentenced to death by lethal gas. The movie ends with her anguished face as she realizes she's going to die.

== Basis ==
Although set in Oklahoma, the film is loosely based on Attina Marie Cannaday, who along with David Gray killed Ronald Wojcik with a knife, in Harrison County, Mississippi, on June 3, 1982.

Cannaday (born September 8, 1965) was charged with robbery, kidnapping, and homicide. At the time of her trial, she was a sixteen-year-old divorcee, who had married at thirteen and divorced at fourteen. She was convicted in Harrison County Circuit Court of the kidnapping and murder of U.S. Air Force Sergeant Ronald Wojcik and the jury sentenced her to death by lethal injection. The guilty verdict was upheld, but the sentence was reversed in 1984, Cannaday v. State, 455 So.2d 713, 720 (Miss. 1984), and she was re-sentenced to one life sentence and two 25-year sentences at Central Mississippi Correctional Facility (inmate number 42451). She was released on parole on March 9, 2008.

Her co-defendant, David Randolph Gray (born May 29, 1954) was charged with aggravated assault, grand larceny, and homicide. He, too, was sentenced to death by lethal injection. His sentence was reversed in May 1987 by the U.S. Supreme Court, in Gray v. Mississippi, 481 U.S. 648, on the basis that "a qualified juror was excluded from his trial". He is currently serving a life sentence in Central Mississippi Correctional Facility (inmate number 01440).

== Cast ==
- Juliette Lewis as Amanda Sue Bradley
- Brad Pitt as Billy Canton
- Michael Tucker as Buddy Thornton
- Alan Fudge as D.A. Mark Calhoun
- Emily Longstreth as Jean Glessner
- Laurie O'Brien as Wanda Bradley Sledge
- Yvette Heyden as Annie Meacham
- Tom Everett as Judge Harper
- Michael O'Keefe as Mike Medwicki
- Dean Abston as Harvey Sledge
- J. Stephen Brady as Brian
- Mark Davenport as Mickey
- Lew Hopson as Star
- Annabelle Weenick as Birdie Jewel
- Charles C. Stevenson Jr. as Pastor
