= Attina Marie Cannaday =

American murderer

- Born: September 8, 1965 (age 61); Mobile, Alabama, U.S.
- Status: Paroled
- Convictions: Capital murder Kidnapping; Robbery
- Penalty: Death; commuted to life imprisonment

Details
- Victims: USAF Sergeant Ronald Wojcik

Attina Marie Cannaday (born September 8, 1965) was charged with robbery, kidnapping, and homicide and is the inspiration for the film Too Young to Die? She was convicted of the kidnapping and murder of U.S. Air Force Sergeant Ronald Wojcik and was initially sentenced to death. The guilty verdict was upheld, but the sentence was reversed in 1984, Cannaday v. State, 455 So.2d 713, 720 (Miss. 1984). Cannaday was re-sentenced to one life sentence and two 25-year sentences at Central Mississippi Correctional Facility. She was released on parole on March 9, 2008.

== Early life ==
Cannaday's mother worked as a stripper in Mobile, Alabama. During her childhood, Cannaday was sexually abused by her father. She was married at age thirteen and divorced by age fourteen, which gave her the opportunity to leave home. After her divorce, Cannaday worked as a sex worker and dancer. Cannaday was said to be handicapped due to her IQ of 71.

== Crimes ==
In 1982, Sixteen-year-old Cannaday met Ronald Wojcik, a twenty-nine year old divorcee with two children. Wojcik pursued Cannaday, and they eventually married. She and Wojcik separated when his military superiors discovered their relationship and uncovered Cannaday's age.

Later that year, Cannaday, David Randolph Gray (a twenty-eight year old unemployed man), and Dawn Bushart (a fifteen-year old) kidnapped Wojcik and his girlfriend, Sandra Sowash. Cannaday stopped the van near a wooded area and Sowash escaped and called the Harrison County Sheriff's Department. Initially, Cannaday told the police that Gray was solely responsible for killing Wojcik but later told a jailer of her involvement in the murder.

== Trial ==
Cannaday was charged with robbery, kidnapping, and homicide in the state of Mississippi in 1982. Cannaday's trial began September 20, 1982. She, Gray, and Bushart were all tried separately. The jury found Cannaday guilty of murder and sentenced her to death by lethal injection on September 23, 1982. On appeal, the Supreme Court of Mississippi affirmed the guilty verdict but granted her a resentencing hearing since she made incriminating statements to a deputy sheriff without her attorney present.

Bushart pleaded guilty to manslaughter and was sentenced to 10 years in prison.

In 1984, Cannaday was resentenced to life in prison. She was released on parole in 2008.

== Legacy ==
Cannaday's crimes and subsequent trial are partly the inspiration for the 1990 TV movie Too Young to Die?. Juliette Lewis played a character loosely based on Cannaday.

The Cannaday v. State trial has been cited as influential in its interpretation of the Eighth Amendment, the prohibition of cruel and unusual punishment. The United States' Supreme Court did not rule sentencing a minor to death as unconstitutional until 2005, but the Mississippi Supreme Court's decision to reverse Cannaday's sentence in 1984 explicitly cited the Eighth Amendment as the basis for its decision.
