= Four on the Floor (Juliette and the Licks album) =

Studio album by Juliette and the Licks
- Released: October 2, 2006
- Recorded: 2006
- Genre: Garage punk Indie rock
- Length: 49:58
- Label: The Militia Group
- Producer: Juliette and the Licks

Juliette and the Licks chronology
You're Speaking My Language (2005)	Four on the Floor (2006)	Terra Incognita (2009)

Four on the Floor is the second full-length album by Juliette and the Licks.

The follow-up to You're Speaking My Language, this album was released on October 2, 2006, in the UK, and later re-released with a bonus DVD featuring documentaries, live performances and music videos. It was released on July 24, 2007, in the US with two bonus tracks.

The first single, "Hot Kiss", was released on September 25, 2006, and the second single "Sticky Honey" was released in 2007. A remix of "Inside the Cage" can be heard in the video game Grand Theft Auto IV on the Radio Broker station.

Before this album began production, both Jason Morris (drummer) and Paul Ill (bass guitarist) left the band for more 'studio-based' work. Jason Womack recorded bass guitar and Dave Grohl recorded the drums. The new live drummer for the supporting tour was Ed Davis.

It was awarded a silver certification from the Independent Music Companies Association which indicated sales of at least 30,000 copies throughout Europe.

Professional ratings
Review scores
Source	Rating
Allmusic	link

== Track listing ==
No.	Title	Writer(s)	Length
1.	"Smash and Grab"	Lewis, Morse	2:47
2.	"Hot Kiss"	Lewis, Morse	2:44
3.	"Sticky Honey"	Lewis, Morse	2:21
4.	"Killer"	Wormack, Lewis	2:18
5.	"Death of a Whore"	Lewis, Morse	3:55
6.	"Purgatory Blues"	Womack, Lewis, Walters, Morse	3:34
7.	"Get Up"	Lewis, Walters	4:58
8.	"Mind Full of Daggers"	Lewis, Walters, Morse	3:43
9.	"Bullshit King"	Lewis, Morse	3:21
10.	"Inside The Cage"	Womack, Lewis	3:59
Total length:			33:40

2007 US release bonus tracks
No.	Title	Writer(s)	Length
11.	"Are You Happy?"	Womack, Lewis, Walters, Morse	5:56
12.	"Lucky For You" (Hidden track)	Womack, Lewis, Walters, Morse	5:00
Total length:			44:36

== Personnel ==
- Juliette Lewis - Lead vocals, executive producer
- Todd Morse - Guitar, backing vocals
- Kemble Walters - Guitar, synthesizer, rhodes, backing vocals
- Jason Womack - Bass guitar
- Dave Grohl - Drums, percussion
- Dylan Mclaren - Producer
