= Juliette and the Licks =

American rock band

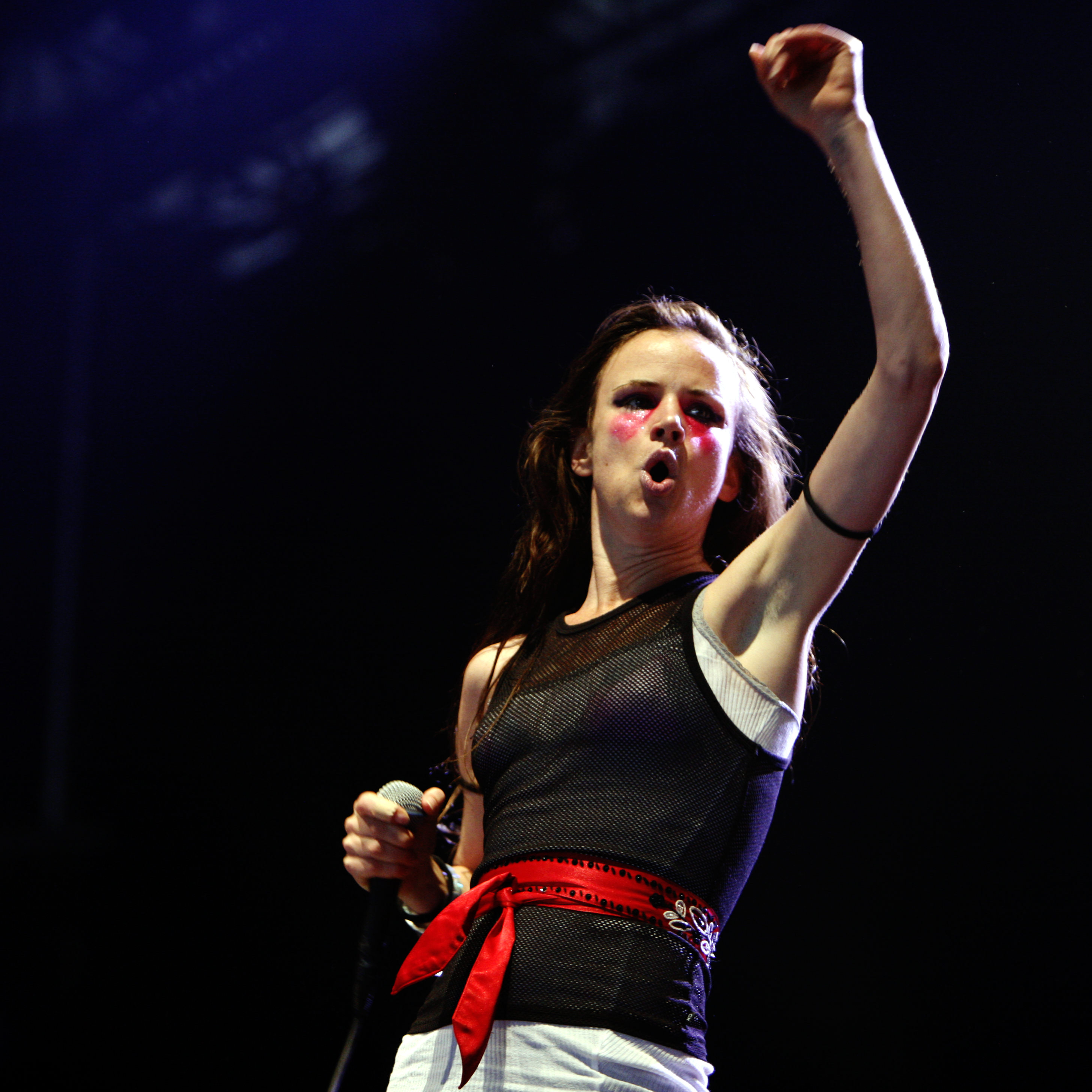
- Juliette Lewis in 2007

Background information
- Origin: United States
- Genres: Indie rock
- Years active: 2003–2009, 2015–2016
- Labels: Hassle; The Militia Group; Fiddler
- Past members: Juliette Lewis; Todd Morse; Craig Fairbaugh; Paul Ill; Patty Schemel; Jason Morris; Jason Womack; Kemble Walters; Ed Davis; Emilio Cueto

Juliette and the Licks were an American rock band led by actress and singer Juliette Lewis. Other band members have included guitarists Todd Morse, Craig Fairbaugh, Emilio Cueto, bassist Jason Womack and drummer Ed Davis. Their popular songs include "You're Speaking My Language" and "Hot Kiss". The band broke up in 2009. They reunited for a Los Angeles show in 2015, followed by extensive touring in 2016. In June 2016, Juliette Lewis announced a solo tour leaving the future of The Licks undetermined.

== History ==
Lewis accompanied Patty Schemel, drummer for Hole, to a Blondie concert and decided to find musicians to accompany herself and Patty. The Licks became Juliette (vocals), Patty Schemel (drums), Todd Morse (guitar) and Paul Ill (bass). The band released their first EP, …Like a Bolt of Lightning, in 2004, which was shortly followed by the debut album, You're Speaking My Language, whose title track became their most successful single, followed by the less successful, disco-influenced "Got Love to Kill". The released version of the second single was a remix of the original song, which had a more rock influence.

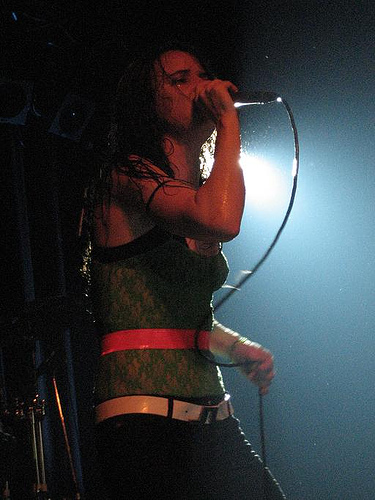
Juliette Lewis in 2007

Schemel left the band before sessions for the second album had begun, so Foo Fighters frontman Dave Grohl filled the gap. The album was recorded by Lewis, Grohl, Morse, Kemble Walters and Jason Womack. Grohl then asked the Licks to be a guest act at the Foo Fighters' sell-out Hyde Park performance in June 2006, to around 85,000 people (other acts were Angels & Airwaves, Queens of the Stone Age and Motörhead). At the same event, Lewis and Moa Holmsten from Meldrum sang backing vocals on one of Motörhead's songs.

Their second album, Four on the Floor, was released in late 2006. "Hot Kiss", which was one of the Licks' most successful singles, was the first release from the album, though the following single, "Sticky Honey", proved less commercially successful. The band then toured America and Europe, including opening for Muse and Chris Cornell.

Kemble Walters left in 2007 to rejoin his original band, The Rise. The band recruited a temporary player before guitarist Emilio Cueto was recruited to fill the spot permanently. The band performed and presented awards at MTV Brasil's music awards that year, and did the same at the 2008 MTVAAs in Sydney, Australia, after which Todd Morse left the band. Craig Fairbaugh replaced Morse on tour, before the band ceased operations in 2009.

The band's track "Inside the Cage" was featured on the Grand Theft Auto IV soundtrack on fictional in-game radio station Radio Broker.

=== Break-Up ===
In a 2009 MySpace blog, Lewis announced the band was at the "end of its run". Explaining that she needed a change to grow as an artist, the singer formed a new band and released a studio album called Terra Incognita in 2009. Of the Licks, she said, "There were only two of them left. They split. Nobody wants to tour all the time. I mean, I do, but not them… It looks like the famous singer fired the whole band, but that's not how it happened."

=== Reunion and new music ===
Since disbanding Juliette and the Licks in 2009, Juliette Lewis has focused mostly on her Hollywood career. Juliette and the Licks announced they would reunite for a special show at the El Rey Theatre in Los Angeles on July 23, 2015. What's more, the indie rockers are currently working on a new album — their first since 2006's Four on the Floor — that was due to arrive in 2016. In a press release, Lewis explained how the idea for a reunion came to fruition. “While recording music with Brad Shultz of Cage the Elephant [she appeared in the band’s recent video for “Take It or Leave It”], I knew I eventually had to put together a killer band. And I thought … Why don’t I get the best band I ever had back together again – The Licks.” “At our peak we were known for our insane chemistry and energy onstage,” she continued. “The last venue I played as a solo act with my other band was El Ray [sic]. I have always loved that venue. I figured let's start with an amazing hometown reunion show with guest musicians. And take it from there.” The reunion show occurred on July 23, followed by an extensive European tour through 2016.

== Band members ==
=== Final members ===
- Juliette Lewis – lead vocals, production (2003–2009, 2015–2016)
- Todd Morse – lead guitar, backing vocals (2003–2008, 2015–2016)
- Jason Womack – bass (2006–2009, 2015–2016)
- Kemble Walters – rhythm guitar, backing vocals (2006–2007, 2015–2016)
- Ed Davis – drums (2006–2009, 2015–2016)

=== Former members ===
- Paul Ill – bass (2003–2006), keyboards, synthesizer, rhodes piano, backing vocals (2006–2007)
- Patty Schemel – drums (2003–2004)
- Jason Morris – drums (2004–2006)
- Emilio Cueto – rhythm guitar (2007–2009)
- Craig Fairbaugh – lead guitar (2008–2009)

=== Session musicians ===
- Dave Grohl – drums on Four on the Floor (2006)

=== Touring members ===
- Brad Wilk – drums (2016)
- Juan Alderete - bass (2016)

== Discography ==
=== Studio albums ===
Title	Details	Peak chart positions		
Title	Details	UK	UK Indie	SCO
You're Speaking My Language	Released: May 17, 2005; Label: Hassle; Format: LP, CD	—	14	95
Four on the Floor	Released: October 2, 2006; Label: TMG; Format: LP, CD	88	4	58

=== Extended plays ===
- ...Like a Bolt of Lightning (2004)

=== Singles ===
Year	Title	Chart positions – UK Singles Chart	Album
2005	"You're Speaking My Language"	No. 35	You're Speaking My Language
2005	"Got Love To Kill"	No. 56	You're Speaking My Language
2006	"Hot Kiss"	No. 50	Four On The Floor
2007	"Sticky Honey"	No. 76	Four On The Floor

== Bibliography ==
- Janne Hietanen: Juliette and the Licks. Pop-magazine Pop-lehti. Records Collectors Magazine, ISSN 1456-1964, n:o 29 pages 36–37.
