= Effects unit =

Electronic device that alters audio

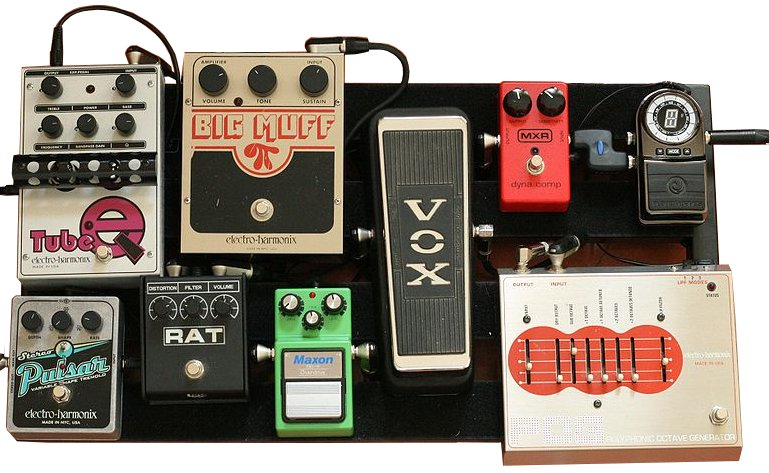
A guitar pedalboard allows a performer to create a ready-to-use chain of multiple pedals to achieve certain types of sounds. Signal chain order: tuner, compressor, octave generator, wah-wah pedal, overdrive, distortion, fuzz, EQ and tremolo.

An effects unit, effects processor, or effects pedal is an electronic device that alters the sound of a musical instrument or other audio source through audio signal processing.

Common effects include distortion/overdrive, often used with electric guitar in electric blues and rock music; dynamic effects such as volume pedals and compressors, which affect loudness; filters such as wah-wah pedals and graphic equalizers, which modify frequency ranges; modulation effects such as chorus, flangers and phasers; pitch effects such as pitch shifters; and time effects such as reverb and delay, which create echoing sounds and emulate the sound of different spaces.

Most modern effects use solid-state electronics or digital signal processors. Some effects, particularly older ones such as Leslie speakers and spring reverbs, use mechanical components or vacuum tubes. Effects are often used as stompboxes, typically placed on the floor and controlled with footswitches. They may also be built into guitar amplifiers, instruments (such as the Hammond B-3 organ), tabletop units designed for DJs and record producers, and rackmounts, and are widely used as audio plug-ins in such common formats as VST, AAX, and AU.

Musicians, audio engineers, and record producers use effects units during live performances or in the studio, typically with electric guitar, bass guitar, electronic keyboard or electric piano. While effects are most frequently used with electric or electronic instruments, they can be used with any audio source, such as acoustic instruments, drums, and vocals.

== Terminology ==
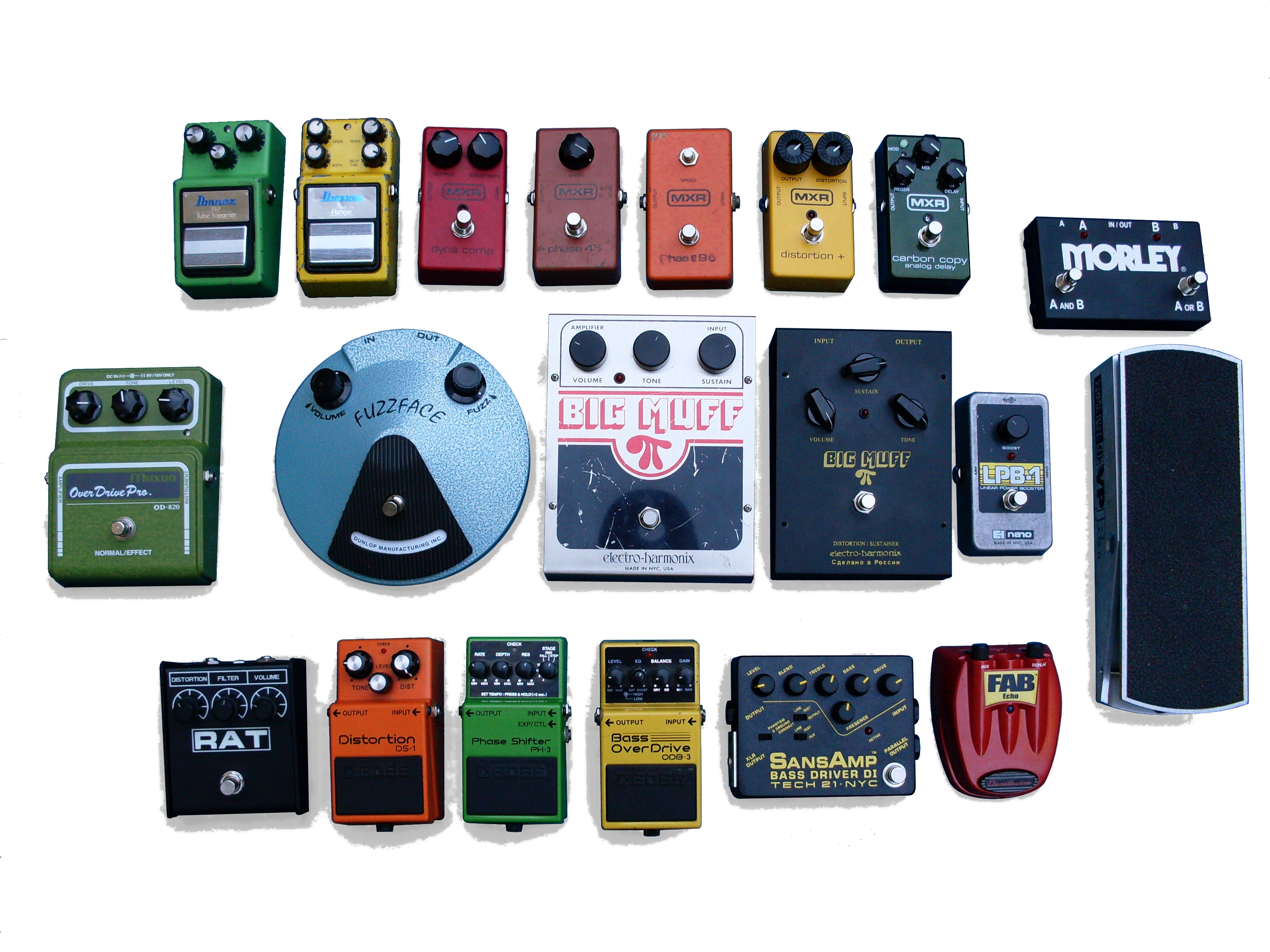
Various type of guitar and bass effect pedals

An effects unit is also called an effect box, effects device, effects processor or simply an effect. The abbreviation F/X or FX is sometimes used. A pedal-style unit may be called a stomp box, stompbox, effects pedal or pedal. Unprocessed audio coming into an effects unit is referred to as dry, while the processed audio output is referred to as wet.

A musician bringing many pedals to a live show or recording session often mounts the pedals on a guitar pedalboard, to reduce set-up and tear-down time and, for pedalboards with lids, protect the pedals during transportation. When a musician has multiple effects in a rack mounted road case, this case may be called an effects rack or rig. When rack-mounted effects are mounted in a road case, this also speeds up a musician's set-up and tear-down time, because all of the effects can be connected together inside the rack case.

== Form factors ==
Effects units are available in a variety of form factors. Stompboxes are used in both live performance and studio recording. Rackmount devices saw a heavy usage during the later 20th century, due to their superior processing power and desirable tones as compared to pedal-style units. However, by the 21st century, with the advent of digital plugins and more powerful stompboxes for live usage, the use of rack-mounted effect units has declined. An effects unit can consist of analog or digital electronics or a combination of the two. During a live performance, the effect is plugged into the electrical signal path of the instrument. In the studio, an instrument or another sound source — possibly an auxiliary output of a mixer or a DAW — is patched into the effect. Whatever the form factor, effects units are part of a studio or musician's outboard gear.

=== Stompboxes ===
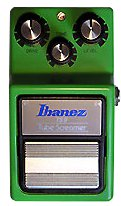
Ibanez Tube Screamer TS9 overdrive pedal

Stompboxes are small plastic or metal chassis that usually lie on the floor or in a pedalboard to be operated by the user's feet. Pedals are often rectangle-shaped, but there is a range of other shapes (e.g., the circular Fuzz Face). Typical simple stompboxes have a single footswitch, one to three potentiometers for controlling the effect, and a single LED that indicates if the effect is on. A typical distortion or overdrive pedal's three potentiometers, for example, control the level or intensity of the distortion effect, the tone of the effected signal and the output level of the effected signal. Depending on the type of pedal, the potentiometers may control different parameters of the effect. For a chorus effect, for example, the knobs may control the depth and speed of the effect. Complex stompboxes may have multiple footswitches, many knobs, additional switches or buttons that are operated with the fingers, and an alphanumeric LED display that indicates the status of the effect with short acronyms (e.g., DIST for "distortion").

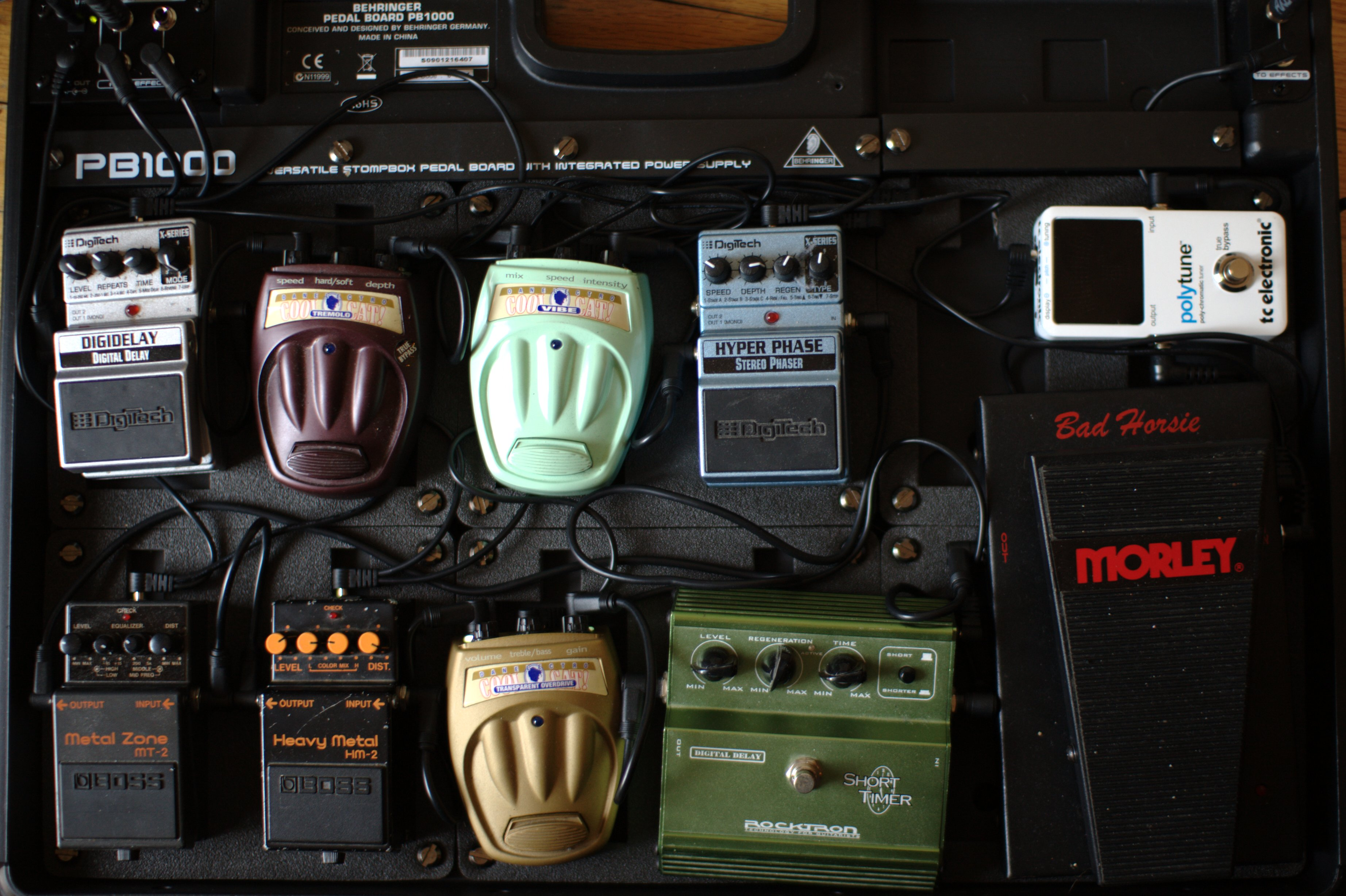
An example of an effects chain. From the input [right] to the output [left]: Tuner [upper right] (tc electronic Polytune) ⇒; Wah pedal [lower right] (Morley Bad Horsie Wah) ⇒; Overdrives/distortion [lower row] (Rocktron Short Timer Delay → Danelectro CTO-1 Transparent Overdrive → Boss HM-2 → Boss MT-2) ⇒; Modulations/delay [upper row] (Digitech Hyper Phase → Danelectro CV-1 Vibe → Danelectro CT Tremolo → Digitech Hyper Delay)

An effects chain is formed by connecting two or more stompboxes forming a signal chain. Effect chains are typically created between the guitar and the amp or between the preamplifier and the power amp. When a pedal is off or inactive, the electric audio signal coming into the pedal diverts onto a bypass, an unaltered dry signal that continues on to other effects down the chain. In this way, a musician can combine effects within a chain in a variety of ways without having to reconnect boxes during a performance. A controller or effects management system lets the musician create multiple effect chains, so they can select one or several chains by tapping a single switch. The switches are usually organized in a row or a simple grid.

It is common to put compression, wah and overdrive pedals at the start of the chain; modulation (chorus, flanger, phase shifter) in the middle; and time-based units (delay/echo, reverb at the end. When using many effects, unwanted noise and hum can be introduced into the sound. Some performers use a noise gate pedal at the end of a chain to reduce unwanted noise and hum introduced by overdrive units or vintage gear.

=== Rackmounts ===
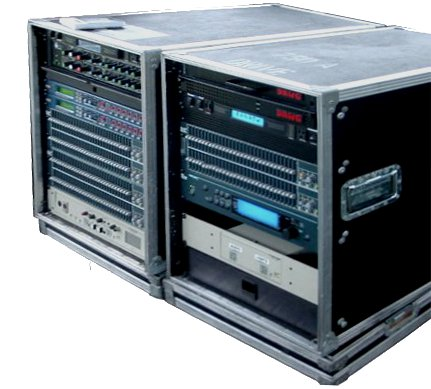
Rackmounted effects in road cases. These road cases have the front protective panels removed so the units can be operated. The protective panels are put back on and latched shut to protect the effects during transportation.

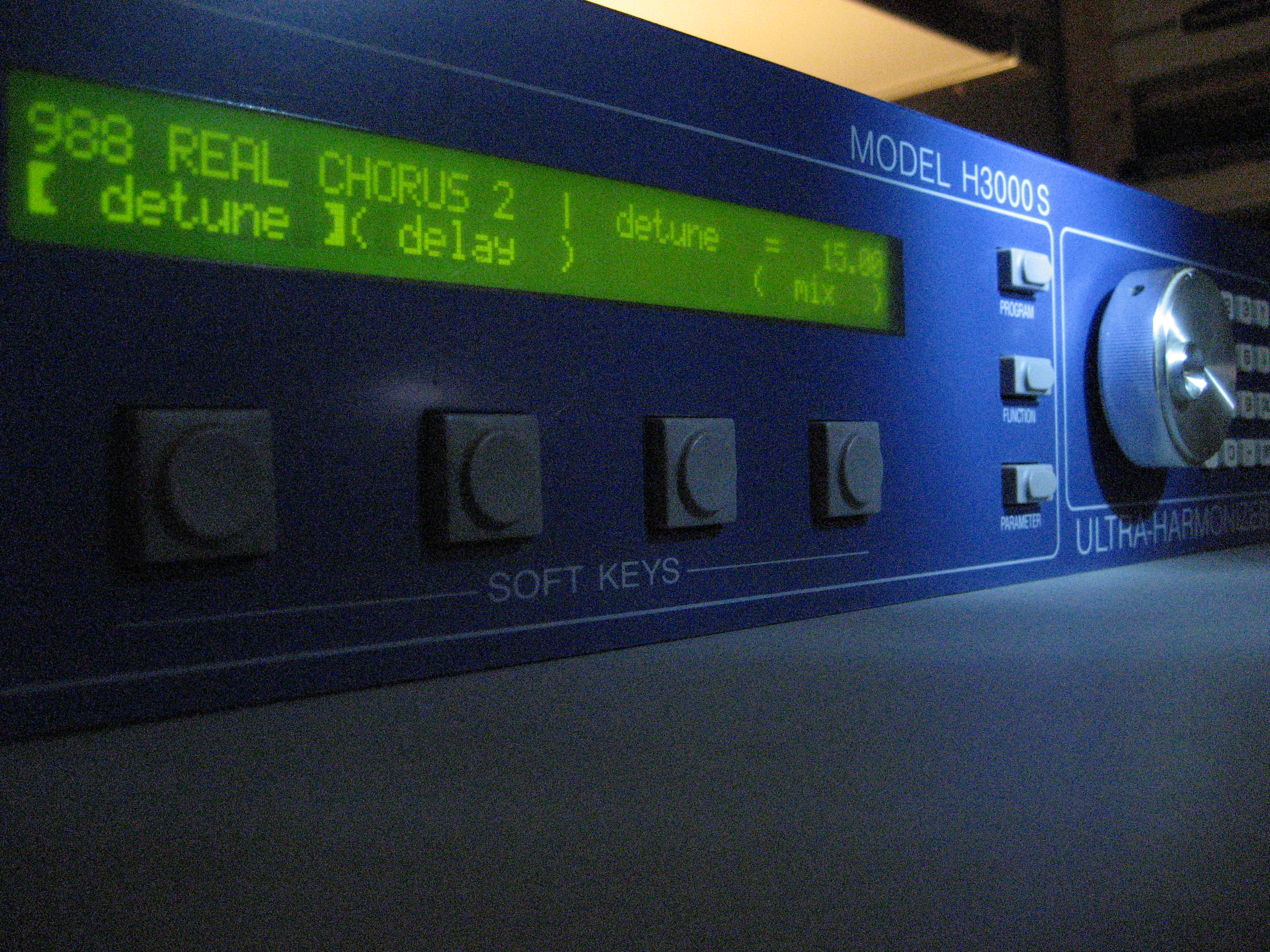
The Eventide HE3000 Ultra-Harmonizer pictured here displays the entire name of an effect or setting, which helps users to find their preferred settings and effects.

Rackmount effects units are typically built in a thin metal chassis with rack ears designed to be screw-mounted into the rack rails of a 19-inch rack that is standard to the music technology industry. Rackmount effects have a standardized 19-inch width, and height of 1 or more rack unit(s). Devices that are less than 19 inches wide can sometimes be made rackmount-compatible via special rackmount adapters.

A rackmount effects unit may contain electronic circuitry identical to a stompbox's, although its circuits are typically more complex. Unlike stompboxes, rackmounts usually have several different types of effects. Rackmount effects units are controlled by knobs, switches or buttons on their front panel, and often remote-controllable by a MIDI digital control interface or pedal-style foot controller.

Rackmount effects units are most commonly used in recording studios and front of house live sound mixing situations. Musicians may use them in place of stompboxes, as use of a rack can offer space for conveniently mounting additional rackmount equipment or accessories. Rackmounted effects units are typically mounted in a rack, which may be housed within a road case, a durable case with removable access panels that protect the equipment within during transportation. Because of this, rackmount effect units are not always designed with durable protective features such as corner protectors which are used on stompboxes and amps that are designed to be transported as standalone units.

=== Multi-effects and tabletop units ===
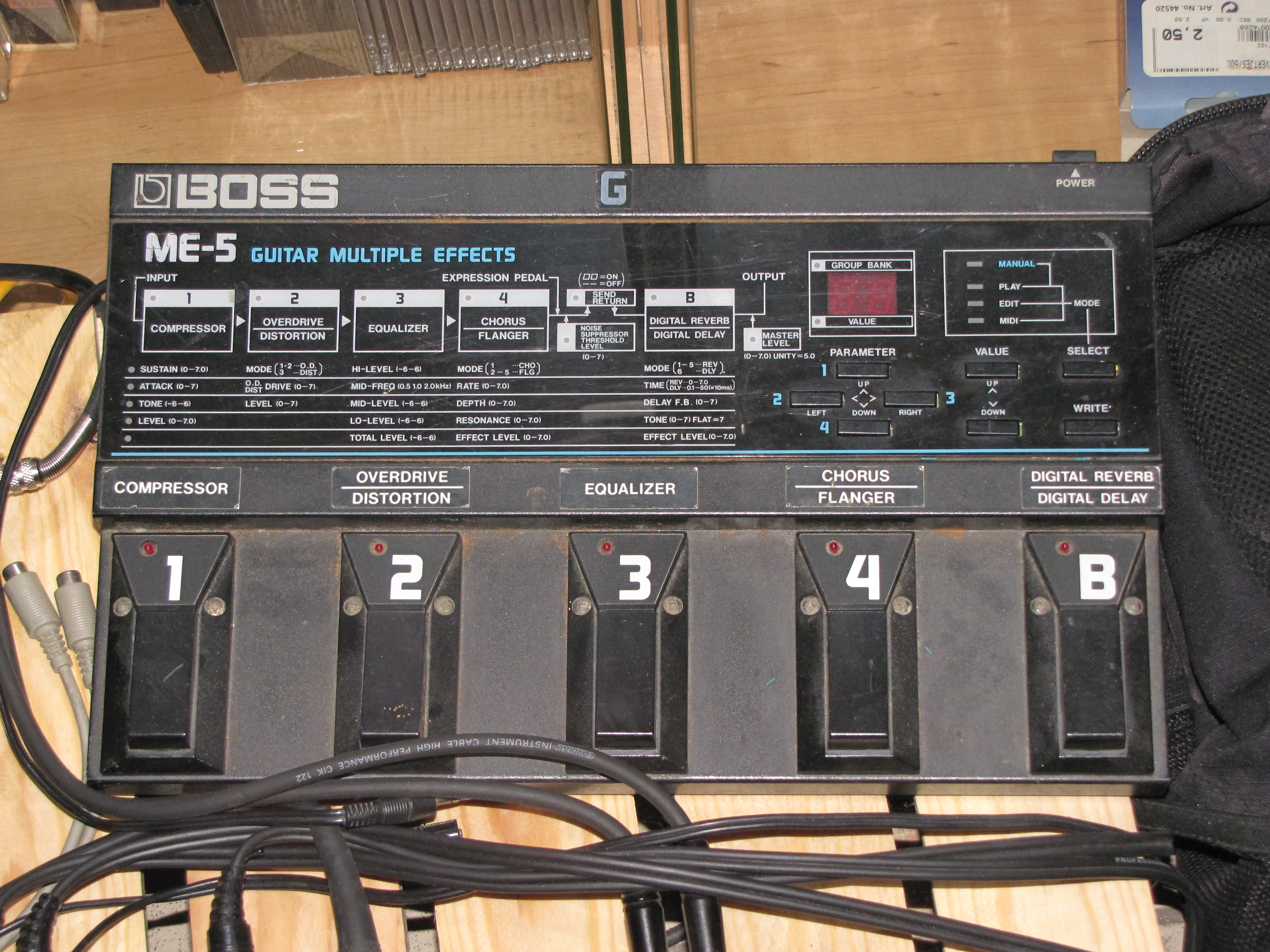
Boss ME-5 multi-effects from 1988 included several pedal effects in one unit, with the ability to write and recall presets.

A multi-effects (MFX) device is a single electronics effects pedal or rackmount device that contains many different electronic effects. multi-effects devices allow users to preset combinations of different effects, allowing musicians quick on-stage access to different effects combinations. Multi-effects units typically have a range of distortion, chorus, flanger, phaser, delay, looper and reverb effects. Pedal-style multi-effects range from fairly inexpensive stompboxes that contain two pedals and a few knobs to control the effects to large, expensive floor units with many pedals and knobs. Rack-mounted multi-effects units may be mounted in the same rack as preamplifiers and power amplifiers.

A tabletop unit is a type of multi-effects device that sits on a desk and is controlled manually. One such example is the Pod guitar amplifier modeler. Digital effects designed for DJs are often sold in tabletop models, so that the units can be placed alongside a DJ mixer, turntables and scratching gear.

=== Built-in units ===
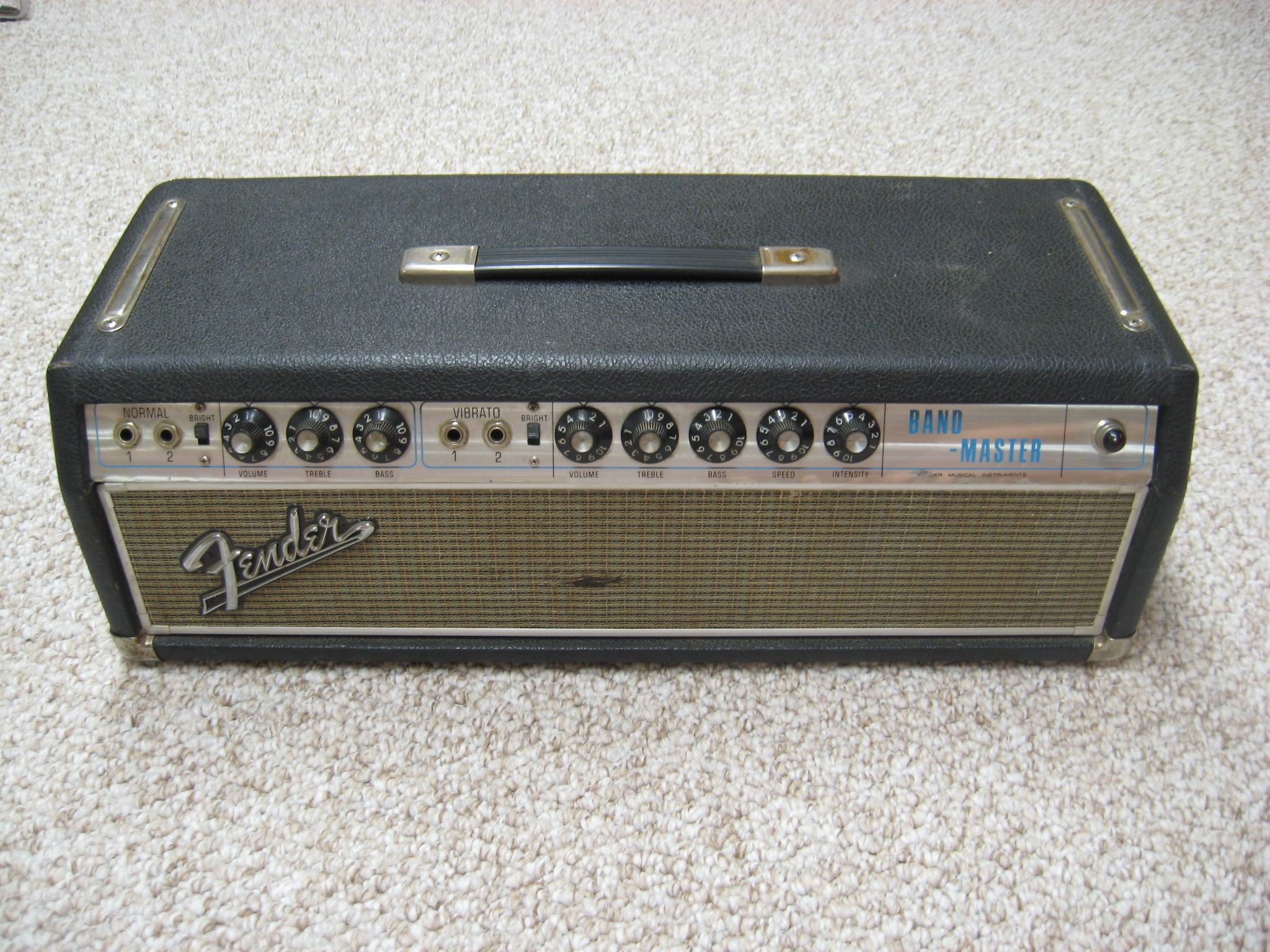
A 1968 Fender Bandmaster amplifier. Note the four inputs, two for regular sound and two which are run through the onboard tremolo effect unit.

Effects are often incorporated into instrument amplifiers and even some types of instruments. Electric guitar amplifiers often have built-in reverb, chorus and distortion, while acoustic guitar and keyboard amplifiers tend to only have built-in reverb. Some acoustic instrument amplifiers have reverb, chorus, compression and equalization (bass and treble) effects. Vintage guitar amps typically have tremolo and vibrato effects, and sometimes reverb. The Fender Bandmaster Reverb amp, for example, had built-in reverb and vibrato. Built-in effects may offer the user less control than standalone pedals or rackmounted units. For example, on some lower- to mid-priced bass amplifiers, the only control on the audio compression effect is a button or switch to turn it on or off, or a single knob. In contrast, a pedal or rackmounted unit would typically provide ratio, threshold and attack controls or other options to allow the user additional control over the compression.

Some guitar amplifiers have built-in multi-effects units or digital amplifier modeling effects. Bass amplifiers are less likely to have built-in effects, although some may have a compressor/limiter or fuzz bass effect.

Instruments with built-in effects include Hammond organs, electronic organs, electronic pianos and digital synthesizers. Built-in effects for keyboards typically include reverb, chorus and, for Hammond organ, vibrato. Many clonewheel organs include an overdrive effect. Occasionally, acoustic-electric and electric guitars will have built-in effects, such as a preamp or equalizer.

== History ==
=== Studio effects and early stand-alone units ===
The earliest sound effects were strictly used in studio productions. Microphones placed in echo chambers with specially designed acoustic properties simulated the sound of live performances in different environments. In the mid to late 1940s, recording engineers and experimental musicians such as Les Paul began manipulating reel-to-reel recording tape to create echo effects and unusual, futuristic sounds. In 1941, DeArmond released the Model 601 Tremolo Control, the first commercially available stand-alone effects unit. This device produced a tremolo by passing an instrument's electrical signal through a water-based electrolytic fluid. Most stand-alone effects of the 1950s and early 1960s such as the Gibson GA-VI vibrato unit and the Fender reverb box, were expensive and impractical, requiring bulky transformers and high voltages. The original stand-alone units were not especially in-demand as many effects came built into amplifiers. The first popular stand-alone was the 1958 Watkins Copicat, a relatively portable tape echo effect made famous by the British band, The Shadows.

=== Amplifiers ===
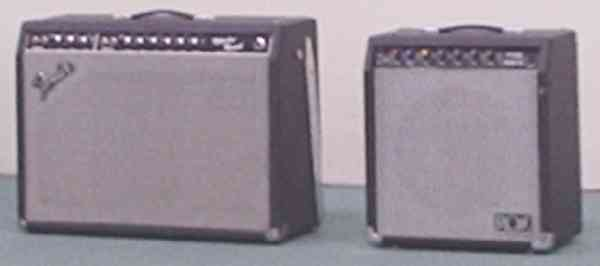
A Fender Vibrolux Reverb amp and a ROSS amp

Effects built into tube-powered guitar amplifiers were the first effects that musicians used regularly outside the studio. From the late 1940s onward, the Gibson began including vibrato circuits in combo amplifiers that incorporated one or more speakers with the amp. The 1950 Ray Butts EchoSonic amp was the first to feature a tape echo, which quickly became popular with guitarists such as Chet Atkins, Carl Perkins, Scotty Moore, Luther Perkins, and Roy Orbison. Both Premier and Gibson built amplifiers with spring reverb. Fender began manufacturing the tremolo amps Tremolux in 1955 and Vibrolux in 1956.

Distortion was not an effect originally intended by amplifier manufacturers, but could often easily be achieved by overdriving the power supply in early tube amplifiers. In the 1950s, guitarists began deliberately increasing gain beyond its intended levels to achieve warm distorted sounds. Among the first musicians to experiment with distortion were Willie Johnson of Howlin' Wolf, Goree Carter, Joe Hill Louis, Ike Turner, Guitar Slim, and Chuck Berry.

In 1954, Pat Hare produced heavily distorted power chords for several recordings (including James Cotton's "Cotton Crop Blues"), creating "a grittier, nastier, more ferocious electric guitar sound," accomplished by turning the volume knob on his amplifier "all the way to the right until the speaker was screaming." Link Wray's 1958 recording "Rumble" inspired young musicians such as Pete Townshend of The Who, Jimmy Page of Led Zeppelin, Jeff Beck, Dave Davies of The Kinks, and Neil Young to explore distortion by various means. In 1966, the British company Marshall Amplification began producing the Marshall 1963, a guitar amplifier capable of producing the distorted crunch that rock musicians were starting to seek.

=== Stompboxes ===
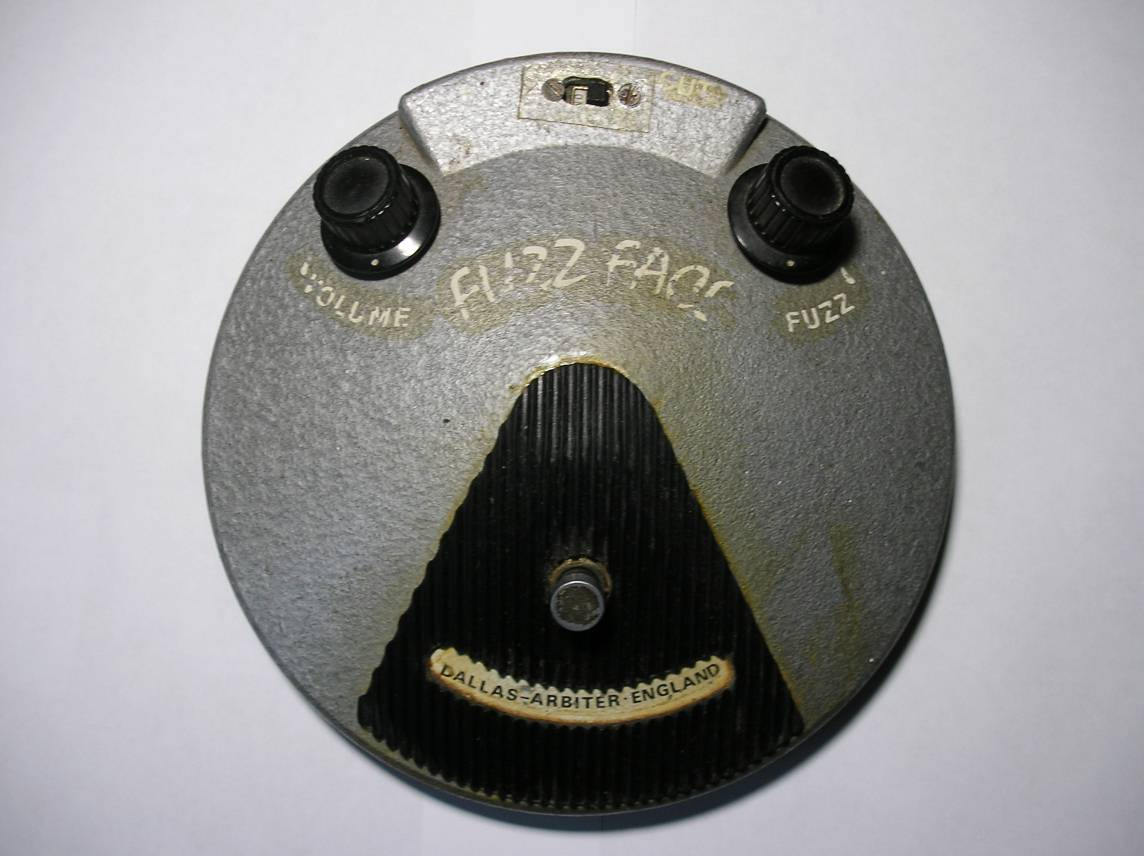
The Fuzz Face effect pedal

The electronic transistor finally made it possible to fit effects circuitry into highly portable stompbox units. Transistors replaced vacuum tubes, allowing for much more compact formats and greater stability. The first transistorized guitar effect was the 1962 Maestro Fuzz Tone pedal, which became a sensation after its use in the 1965 Rolling Stones hit "(I Can't Get No) Satisfaction".

Warwick Electronics manufactured the first wah-wah pedal, The Clyde McCoy, in 1967 and that same year Roger Mayer developed the first octave effect, which Jimi Hendrix named "Octavio". Upon first hearing the Octavia, Hendrix reportedly rushed back to the studio and immediately used it to record the guitar solos on "Purple Haze" and "Fire". In 1968, Univox began marketing Shin-ei's Uni-Vibe pedal, an effect designed by noted audio engineer Fumio Mieda that mimicked the odd phase shift and chorus effects of the Leslie rotating speakers used in Hammond organs. The pedals soon became favorite effects of guitarists Jimi Hendrix and Robin Trower. In 1976, Roland subsidiary Boss Corporation released the CE-1 Chorus Ensemble, the first chorus pedal, created by taking a chorus circuit from an amplifier and putting it into a stompbox. By the mid-1970s a variety of solid-state effects pedals including flangers, chorus pedals, ring modulators and phase shifters were available.

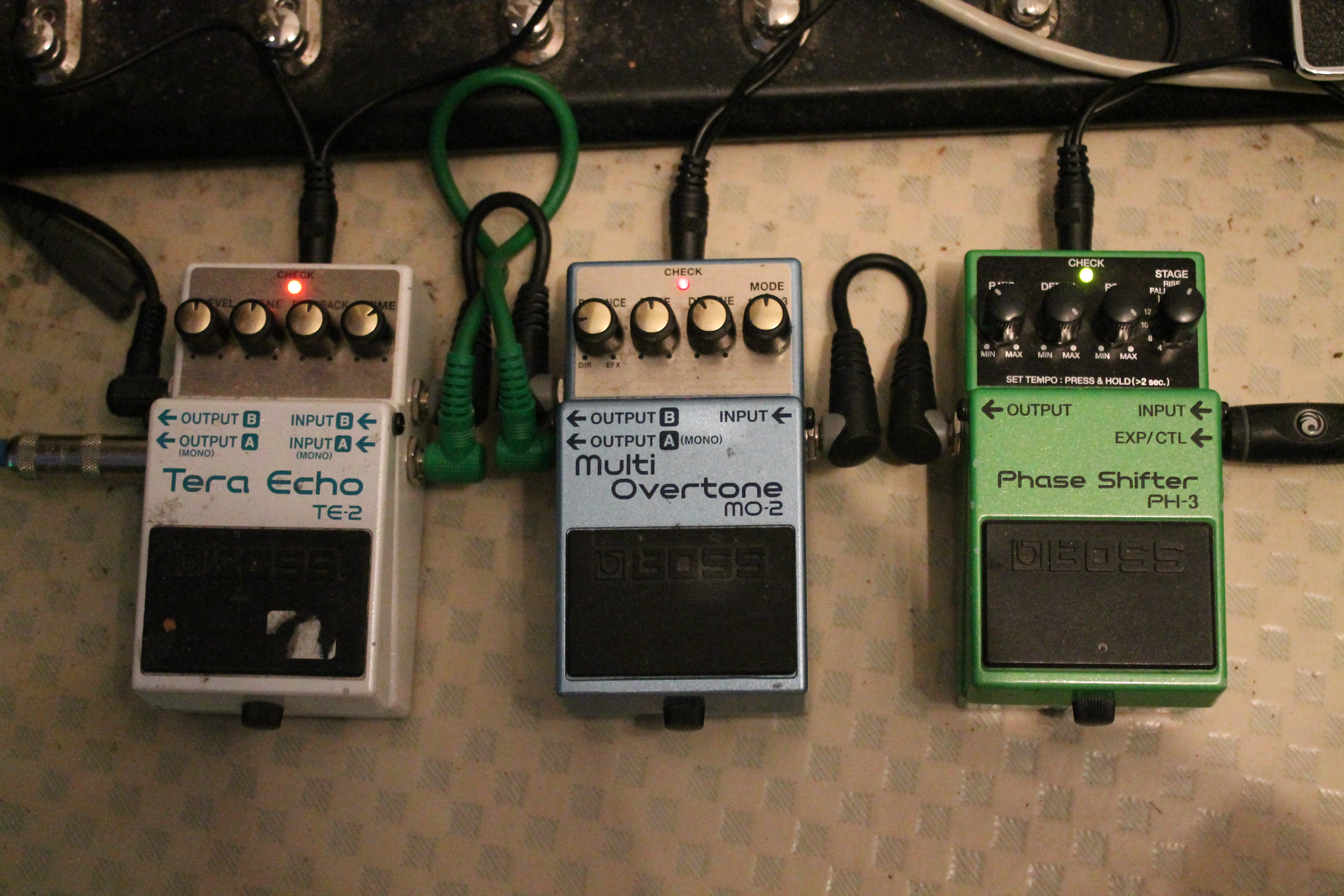
Several Boss pedals connected together

In the 1980s, digital rackmount units began replacing stompboxes as the effects format of choice. Often musicians would record dry, unaltered tracks in the studio and effects would be added in post-production. The success of Nirvana's 1991 album Nevermind helped to re-ignite interest in stompboxes. Some grunge guitarists would chain several fuzz pedals together and plug them into a tube amplifier. Throughout the 1990s, musicians committed to a lo-fi aesthetic such as J Mascis of Dinosaur Jr., Stephen Malkmus of Pavement and Robert Pollard of Guided by Voices continued to use analog effects pedals.

Effects and effects units—stompboxes in particular—have been celebrated by pop and rock musicians in album titles, songs and band names. The Big Muff, a fuzzbox manufactured by Electro-Harmonix, is commemorated by the Depeche Mode song "Big Muff" and the Mudhoney EP Superfuzz Bigmuff. Nine Inch Nails, Pink Floyd, George Harrison, They Might Be Giants and Joy Division are among the many musicians who have referenced effects units in their music.

== Techniques ==
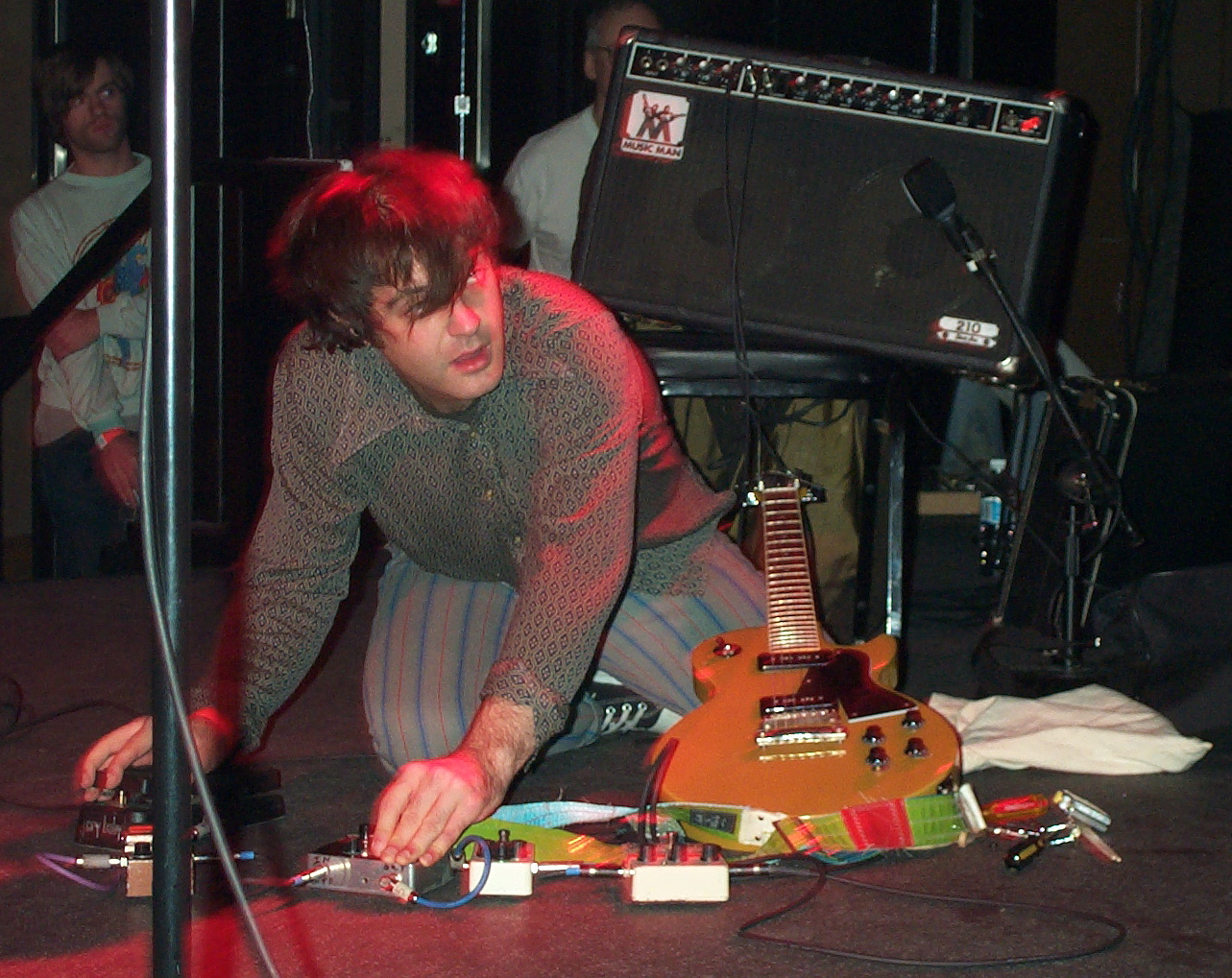
Jim O’Rourke kneeling while operating two stompboxes with his hands

=== Distortion ===
Distortion effect
Electric guitar played first clean (no effects), then with distortion pedal.

Clipping an instrument's audio signal produces distortion

Distortion, overdrive, and fuzz effects units add a warm, gritty, or fuzzy character to an audio signal by re-shaping or clipping it, which distorts the shape of its waveform by flattening its peaks, creating warm sounds by adding harmonics or gritty sounds by adding inharmonic overtones. Distortion effects are sometimes called gain effects, as distorted guitar sounds were first achieved by increasing the gain of tube amplifiers.

While distortion effects units produce perfectly flattened peaks or hard clipping, overdrive effects units produce soft tube-like distortion by compressing the waveform without completely flattening it. Much like guitar tube amplifiers, overdrive effects units are capable of producing clean sounds at lower volumes and distorted warm sounds at higher volumes.

Notable examples of distortion and overdrive pedals include the Boss DS-1 Distortion, Ibanez Tube Screamer, Marshall ShredMaster, MXR Distortion +, and Pro Co RAT.

A fuzz pedal, or fuzzbox, is a type of overdrive effects unit that clips a signal until it is nearly a square wave, resulting in a heavily distorted or fuzzy sound. Fuzzboxes may contain frequency multiplier circuitry to achieve a harsh timbre by adding complex harmonics. The Rolling Stones' song "(I Can't Get No) Satisfaction", with a fuzz effect featured prominently on the main electric guitar riff played by Keith Richards, greatly popularized the use of fuzz effects. Fuzz bass (also called bass overdrive) is a style of playing the electric bass that produces a buzzy, overdriven sound via a tube or transistor amp or by using a fuzz or overdrive pedal.

Notable examples of fuzz effect units include the: Arbiter Fuzz Face, Electro-Harmonix Big Muff, Shin-ei Companion FY-2, Univox Super-Fuzz, Vox Tone Bender, Z.Vex Fuzz Factory.

While distortion effect units are most associated with electric and bass guitar, they are also commonly used on keyboard instruments (i.e. synthesizers, combo and tonewheel organs, electric piano), as well as drums and vocals.

=== Dynamics ===
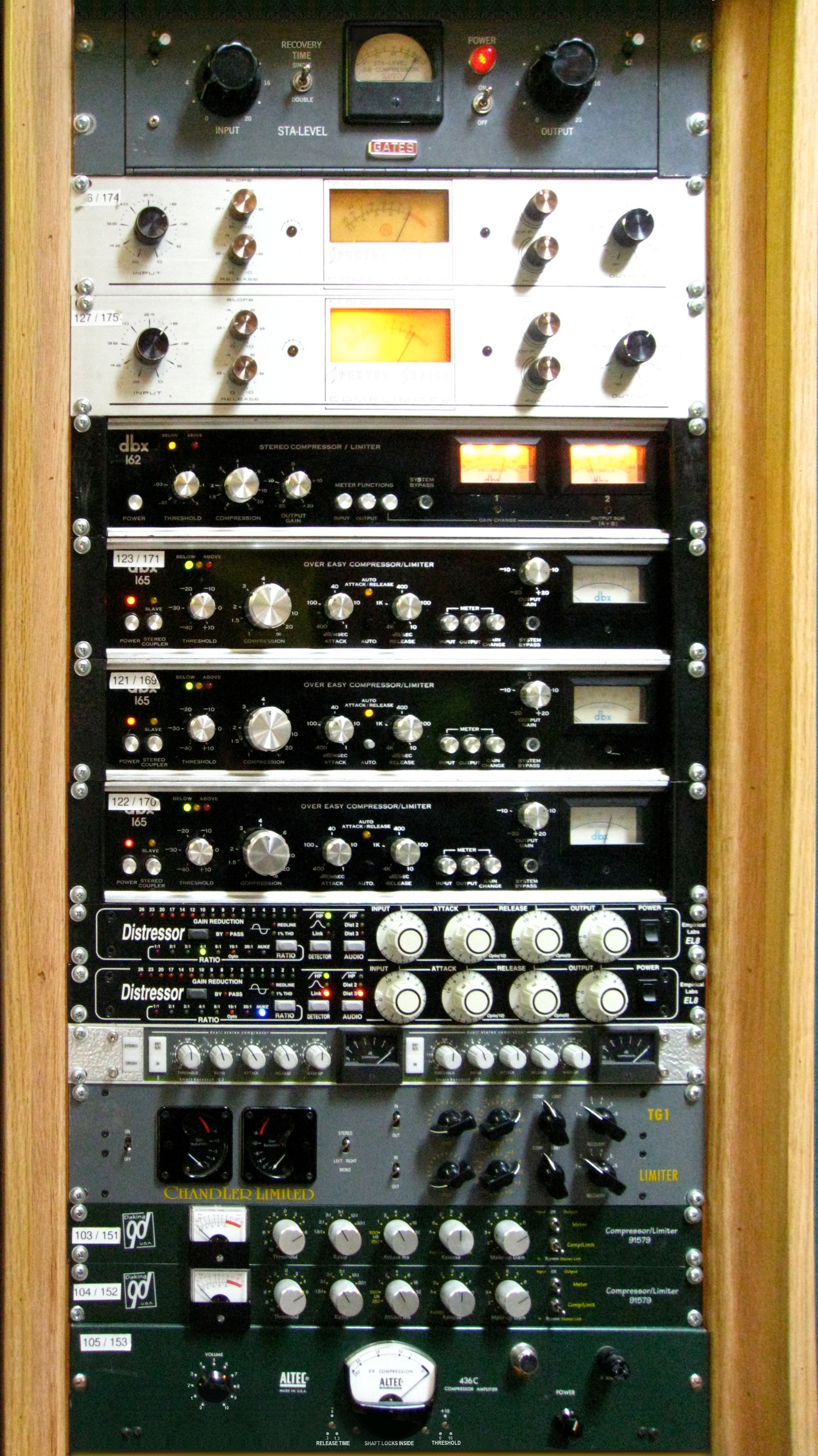
A rack of rackmount audio compressors in a recording studio. From top to bottom: Retro Instruments/Gates STA level; Spectra Sonic; Dbx 162; Dbx 165; Empirical Labs Distressor; Smart Research C2; Chandler Limited TG1; Daking FET (91579); and Altec 436c.

Also called volume and amplitude effects, dynamics effects modify the volume of an instrument. Dynamics effects were among the first effects introduced to guitarists.

Boost/volume pedal: When activated, a boost or clean boost pedal amplifies the volume of an instrument by increasing the amplitude of its audio signal. These units are generally used for boosting volume during solos and preventing signal loss in long effects chains. A guitarist switching from rhythm guitar to lead guitar for a guitar solo may use a boost to increase the volume of their solo.

Volume effects: Electro-Harmonix LPB-1, Fender Volume Pedal, MXR Micro Amp, Ernie Ball Volume Pedal. Treadle-based volume pedals are used by electric instrument players (guitar, bass, keyboards) to adjust the volume of their instrument with one foot while their hands are being used to play their instrument. Treadle-style volume pedals are often also used to create swelling effects by removing the attack of a note or chord, as popularised by pedal steel guitar players. This enables electric guitar and pedal steel players to imitate the soft swelling sound that an orchestra string section can produce, in which a note or chord starts very softly and then grows in volume. Treadle-based volume pedals do not usually have batteries or require external power.

Compressor: Compressors make loud sounds quieter and quiet sounds louder by decreasing or compressing the dynamic range of an audio signal. A compressor is often used to stabilize volume and alter the sound of a note's attack. With extreme settings of its controls, a compressor can function as a limiter.

Compressor effects: Keeley Compressor, MXR Dyna Comp, Boss CS-3 Compression Sustainer.

Noise gate: Noise gates attenuate hum, hiss, and static in the signal by greatly diminishing the volume when the signal falls below a set threshold. Noise gates are expanders—meaning that, unlike compressors, they increase the dynamic range of an audio signal to make quiet sounds even quieter. If used with extreme settings and combined with reverb, they can create unusual sounds, such as the gated drum effect used in 1980s pop songs, a style popularized by the Phil Collins song In the Air Tonight.

Noise gate effects: Boss NS-2 Noise Suppressor.

=== Filter ===
Filter effects alter the frequency content of an audio signal that passes through them by either boosting or weakening specific frequencies or frequency regions.

Equalizer: An equalizer is a set of linear filters that strengthen (boost) or weaken (cut) specific frequency regions. While basic home stereos often have equalizers for two bands, to adjust bass and treble, professional graphic equalizers offer much more targeted control over the audio frequency spectrum. Audio engineers use highly sophisticated equalizers to eliminate unwanted sounds, make an instrument or voice more prominent, and enhance particular aspects of an instrument's tone.

Equalizer effects: Boss GE-7 Equalizer, MXR 10-band EQ Pedal.

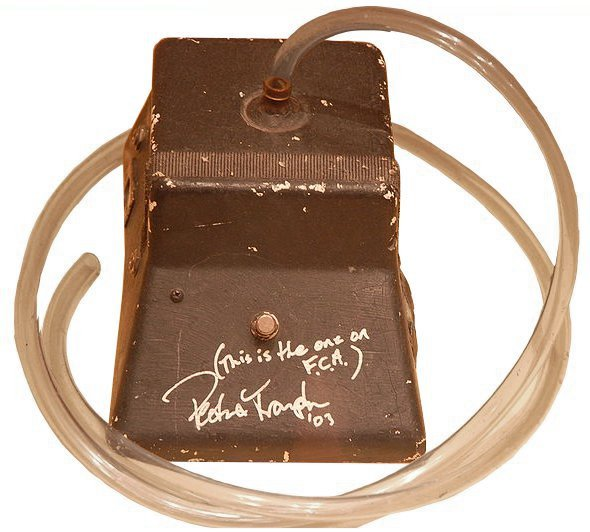
Peter Frampton's Talk box

Talk box: A talk box directs the sound from an electric guitar or synthesizer into the mouth of a performer using a tube, allowing the sound to be shaped into vowels and consonants with movements of the mouth. The modified sound is then picked up by a microphone. In this way, the guitarist is able create the effect that the guitar is talking. Some famous uses of the talkbox include Bon Jovi's "Livin' on a Prayer", Stevie Wonder's "Black Man", Mötley Crüe's "Kickstart My Heart", Joe Walsh's "Rocky Mountain Way", Alice in Chains's "Man in the box" and Peter Frampton's "Show Me the Way".

Talk boxes: Dunlop HT1 Heil Talk Box, Rocktron Banshee.

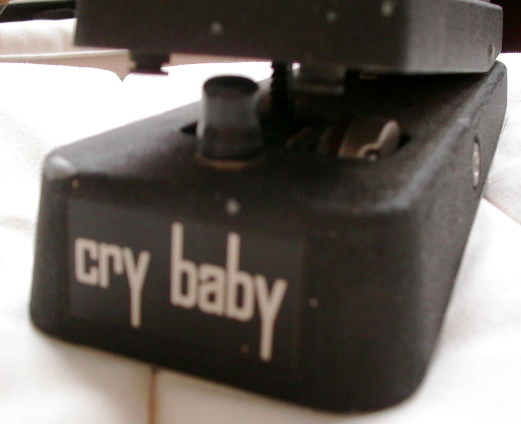
Thomas Organ Cry Baby Wah-wah pedal (1970) manufactured by JEN

Wah-wah: A wah-wah pedal creates vowel-like sounds by altering the frequency spectrum produced by an instrument—i.e., how loud it is at each separate frequency—in what is known as a spectral glide or sweep. The device is operated by a foot treadle that manipulates a potentiometer or other electronic control. Wah-wah pedals are often used by funk and rock guitarists.

Wah effects: Dunlop Cry Baby, Morley Power Wah, Vox.

Auto-wah or, more generally, envelope filter effects: A filter effect that is controlled by the volume of the input signal. The most common filter type used for this effect pedal is the low-pass filter, although many designs include a toggle for band-pass or high-pass filters as well. Additionally, some designs can switch between a down filter mode and an up filter. This effect is commonly used in funk, reggae and jam band music.

Envelope filter effects: Musitronics Mu-Tron III, Electro-Harmonix Q-Tron Plus, DOD Envelope Filter 440.

=== Modulation ===
Chorus effect
Chorus effect on guitar, coming from an Electro-Harmonix Small Clone

Flanging effect
A short synthesizer sample followed by two flanging versions

Phaser effect
Unprocessed organ followed by different phasing effects

Ring modulation effect
Bell-like sound

Tremolo effect
A low-frequency oscillator modulating a tremolo (synthesizer)

Vibrato effect
A low-frequency oscillator modulating a vibrato (synthesizer)

Modulation, in general electronics, means the altering of one signal based on another. In audio effects, modulation is a control feature that varies the strength or other attribute of the effect over time to alter tonal properties. Some modulation effects modulate an instrument's audio signal with a signal generated by the effect called a carrier wave. Other modulation effects split an instrument's audio signal in two, altering one portion of the signal and mixing it with the unaltered portion.

Chorus: Chorus pedals mimic the effect choirs and string orchestras produce naturally, by mixing similar sounds with slight differences in timbre and pitch. A chorus effect splits the audio signal and adds a slight delay and frequency variations or vibrato to one version while leaving the rest unaltered. A well-known usage of chorus is the lead guitar in "Come As You Are" by Nirvana.

Chorus effects: Boss CE-1 Chorus Ensemble, Electro-Harmonix Small Clone, TC Electronic Stereo Chorus.

Flanger: A flanger creates a whooshing, jet plane or spaceship sound, simulating a studio effect that was first produced by recording a track on two synchronized tape decks and periodically slowing one tape by pressing the edge of its reel (the flange). When the two tapes' audio signals are later mixed, a comb filter effect can be heard. Flanger units add a variably delayed version of the audio signal to the original or signal, creating a comb filter or Doppler effect. Some famous uses of flanger effects include "Walking on the Moon" by The Police, the intro to "Ain't Talkin' 'Bout Love" by Van Halen, and "Barracuda" by Heart.

Flanger effects: Electro-Harmonix Electric Mistress, MXR Flanger, Boss BF-3 Flanger.

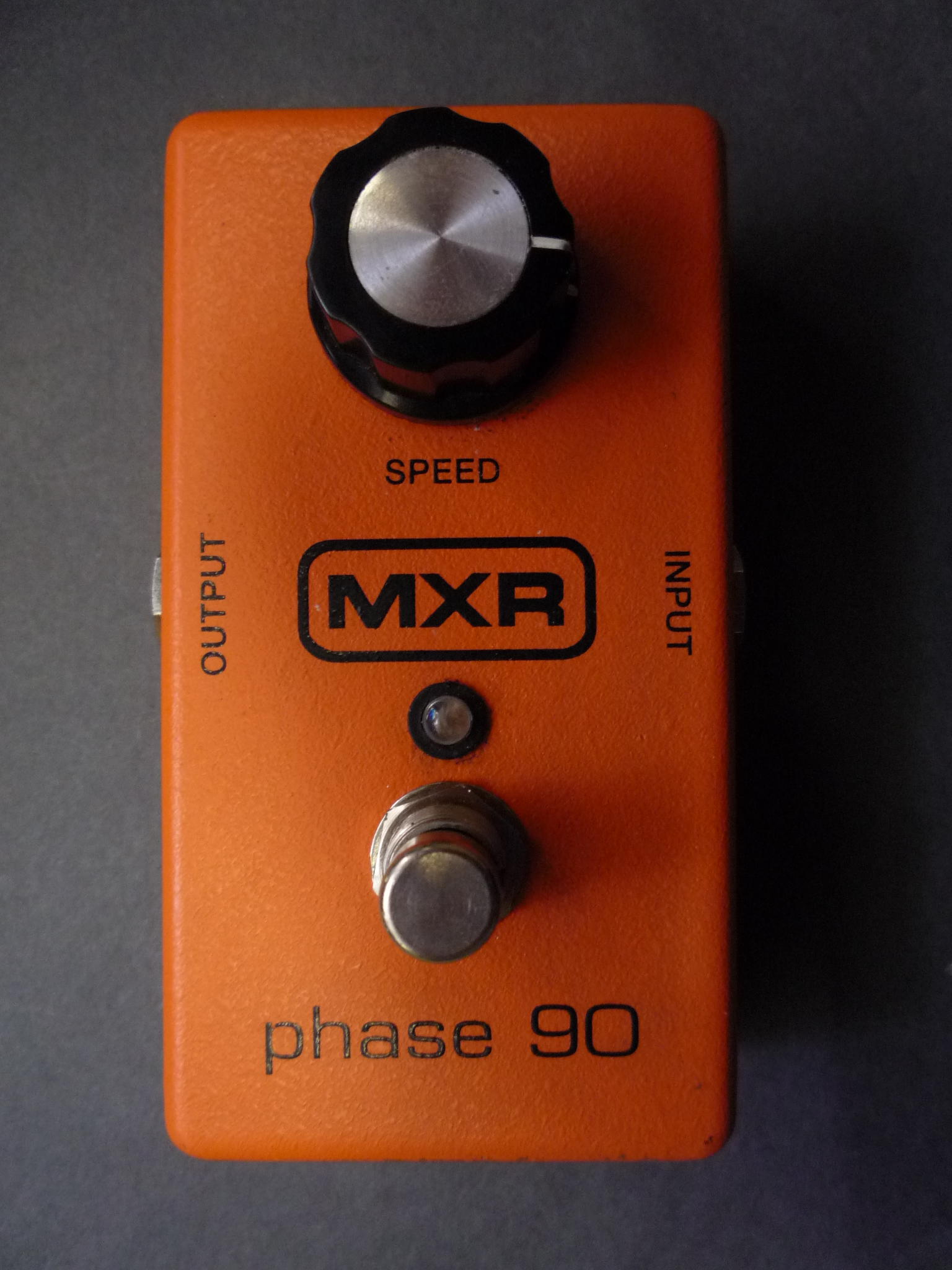
An MXR-101 Phaser pedal

Phaser: A phaser or phase shifter creates a slight rippling effect—amplifying some aspects of the tone while diminishing others—by splitting an audio signal in two and altering the phase of one portion. Three well-known examples of phaser are the two-handed tapping part on the Van Halen instrumental "Eruption" and the keyboard parts on Billy Joel's "Just the Way You Are" and Paul Simon's "Slip Slidin' Away".

Phase shift effects: Uni-Vibe, Electro-Harmonix Small Stone, MXR Phase 90.

Ring modulator: A ring modulator produces a resonant, metallic sound by frequency mixing an instrument's audio signal with a carrier wave generated by the device's internal oscillator. The original sound wave is suppressed and replaced by a ring of inharmonic higher and lower pitches or sidebands. A notable use of ring modulation is the guitar in the Black Sabbath song "Paranoid".

Ring modulator effects: Moogerfooger MF-102 Ring Modulator.

Tremolo: A tremolo effect produces a variation in the volume of a signal. The tremolo effect should not be confused with the misleadingly-named tremolo bar, a device on a guitar bridge that creates a vibrato or pitch-bending effect. In electronic effects, a tremolo is produced by modulating an instrument's audio signal with a sub-audible carrier wave in such a way that generates amplitude variations in the sound wave. Tremolo effects are built-in effects in some vintage guitar amplifiers. The guitar intro in the Rolling Stones' "Gimme Shelter" features a tremolo effect.

Tremolo effects: Demeter TRM-1 Tremulator, Fender Tremolux.

Slicer: Combines a modulation sequence with a noise gate or envelope filter to create a percussive and rhythmic effect like a helicopter.

Vibrato: Vibrato effects produce slight, rapid variations in pitch, mimicking the fractional semitone variations produced naturally by opera singers and violinists when they are prolonging a single note. Vibrato effects often allow the performer to control the rate of the variation as well as the difference in pitch (depth). A vibrato with an extreme depth setting (e.g., half a semitone or more) will produce a dramatic, ululating sound. In transistorized effects, vibrato is produced by mixing an instrument's audio signal with a carrier wave in such a way that generates frequency variations in the sound wave. Guitarists often use the terms vibrato and tremolo misleadingly. A so-called vibrato unit in a guitar amplifier may actually produces tremolo, while a tremolo arm or whammy bar on a guitar produces vibrato.

Vibrato effects: Boss VB-2 Vibrato.

=== Pitch and frequency ===
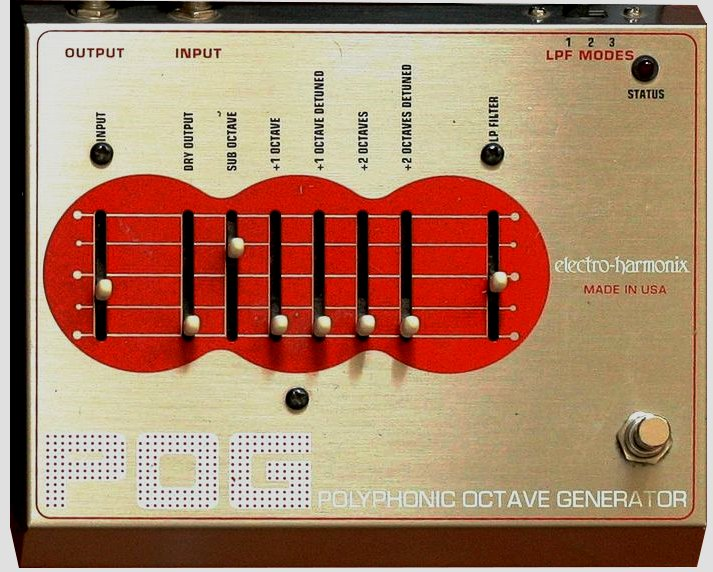
An Electro-Harmonix Polyphonic Octaver Generator (POG)

A pitch shifter (also called an octaver for effects that shift pitch by an octave) raises or lowers (i.e. transposes) each note a performer plays by a pre-set interval. For example, a pitch shifter set to increase the pitch by a fourth will raise each note four diatonic intervals above the notes actually played. Simple, less expensive pitch shifters raise or lower the pitch by one or two octaves, while more sophisticated devices offer a range of interval alterations. A pitch shifter can be used by an electric guitarist to play notes that would normally only be available on an electric bass. As well, a bass player with a four string electric bass can use an octave pedal to obtain low notes that would normally only be obtainable with a five-string bass with a low B string.

A harmonizer is a type of sophisticated pitch shifter that combines the altered pitch with the original pitch to create a two or three note harmony based on the original pitch. Some hamonizers are able to create chorus-like effects by modulating of small shifts in pitch.

The first mass-market digital pitch shifter was the DigiTech Whammy, introduced in 1989. It creates a "strange and artificial" sound, with distinctive "wobbly" artifacts. Its users include Jonny Greenwood and Ed O'Brien of Radiohead, Matt Bellamy of Muse, Tom Morello of Rage Against the Machine and Audioslave, David Gilmour of Pink Floyd and Jack White of the White Stripes. Guitar World described the Whammy as one of the most iconic guitar pedals.

=== Time-based ===
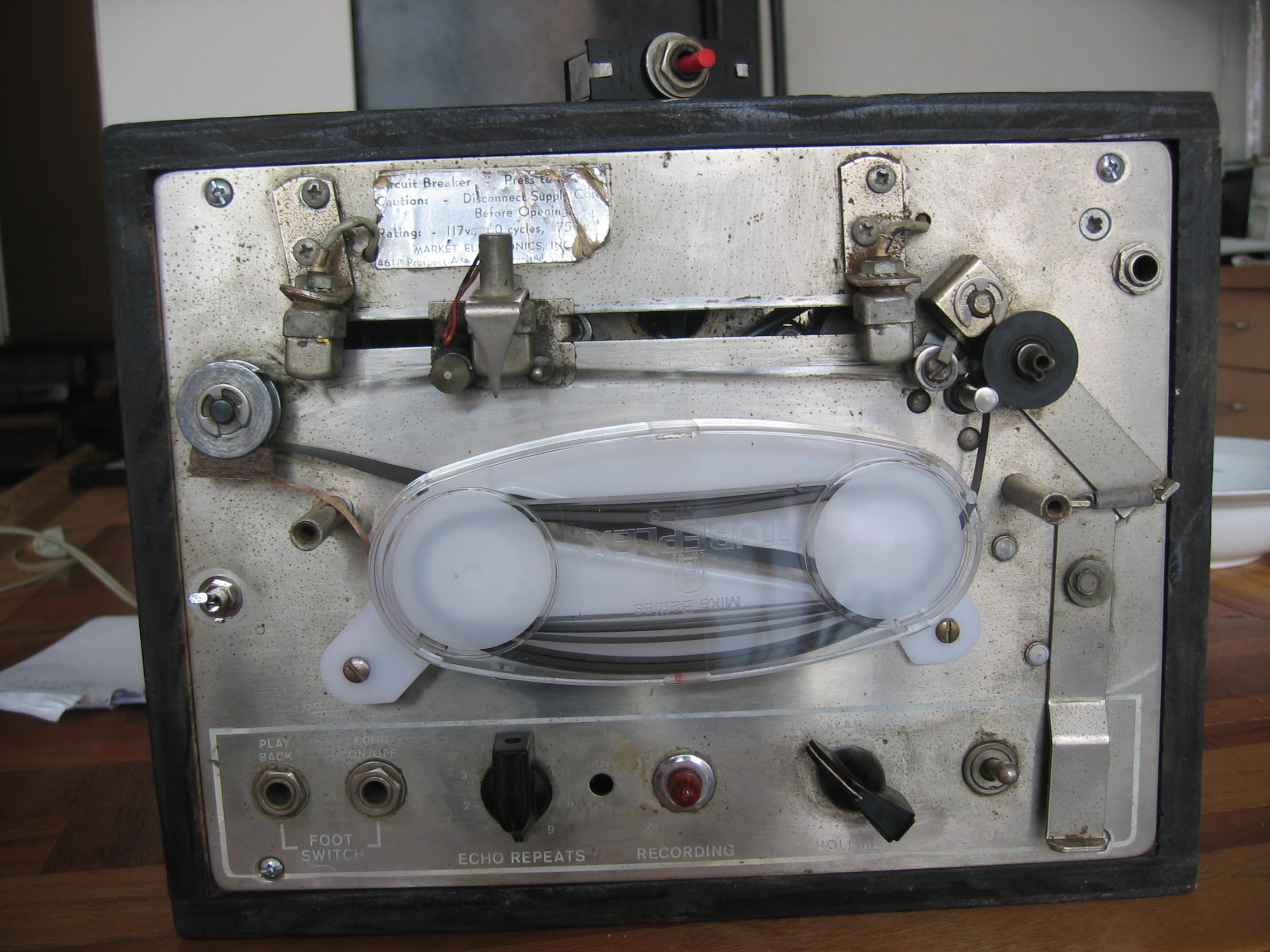
A vintage Echoplex EP-2 delay effect

Delay effect
A flute before and after delay

Reverberation effect
Reverb with increasingly longer delay

Time-based effects delay the sound signal, add reverb or echos, or enable musicians to record and play back loops.

Delay/echo: Delay/echo units produce an echo effect by adding a duplicate to the original signal at a slight time delay. The effect can either be a single echo (called a slap or slapback), or multiple echos. A well-known use of delay is the lead guitar in the U2 song "Where the Streets Have No Name", and also the opening riff of "Welcome to the Jungle" by Guns N' Roses.

Delay effects: Boss DD-3 Digital Delay, MXR Carbon Copy, Electro-Harmonix Deluxe Memory Man, Line 6 DL4, Roland RE-201.

Looper pedal: A looper pedal or phrase looper allows a performer to record and later replay a phrase, riff or passage from a song. Loops can be created on the spot during a performance (live looping) or they can be pre-recorded. By using a looper pedal, a singer-guitarist in a one person band can play the backing chords to a song, loop them with the pedal, and then sing and do a guitar solo over the chords. Some units allow a performer to layer multiple loops, enabling the performer to create the effect of a full band. The first loop effects were created with reel-to-reel tape using a tape loop.

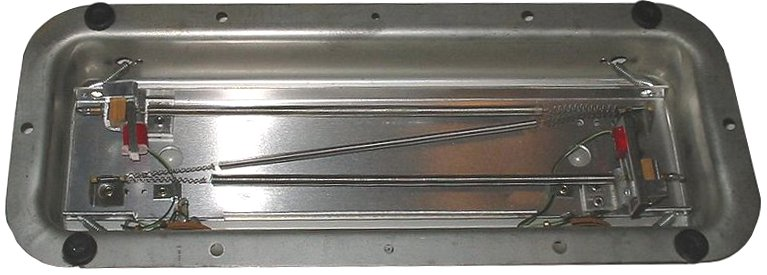
Folded line spring reverberation

Reverb: Reverb units simulate the spacious sounds produced naturally in any acoustic space, from hall or room to a huge stone cathedral. This is done by creating a large number of echoes that gradually fade away in volume or decay. One early technique for creating a reverb effect was to send an amplified signal of the music via a speaker to another room with reflective surfaces, such as a tile bathroom, and then record the natural reverberations that were produced. A plate reverb system uses an electromechanical transducer to create vibrations in a plate of metal. Spring reverb systems, which are often used in guitar amplifiers, use a transducer to create vibrations in a spring. Digital reverb effects use various signal processing algorithms to create the reverb effect, often by using multiple feedback delay circuits. Rockabilly and surf guitar are two genres that make heavy use of reverb.

Reverb effects: Electro-Harmonix Holy Grail, Fender Reverb Unit.

=== Feedback and sustain ===
Audio feedback is an effect produced when amplified sound is picked up by a microphone or guitar pickup and played back through a guitar amplifier, initiating a feedback loop, which usually consists of high-pitched sound. Feedback that occurs from a vocal mic into a PA system is almost always avoided. However, in some styles of rock music, electric guitar players intentionally create feedback by playing their instrument directly in front of the speaker enclosure of a guitar amplifier set up with sufficient gain. The creative use of feedback effects was pioneered by guitarists such as Jimi Hendrix in the 1960s. This technique creates sustained, high-pitched overtones and unusual sounds not possible through regular playing techniques. Guitar feedback effects can be difficult to perform, because it is difficult to determine the sound volume and guitar position relative to a guitar amp's loudspeaker necessary for achieving the desired feedback sound. Guitar feedback effects are used in a number of rock genres, including psychedelic rock, heavy metal music and punk rock.

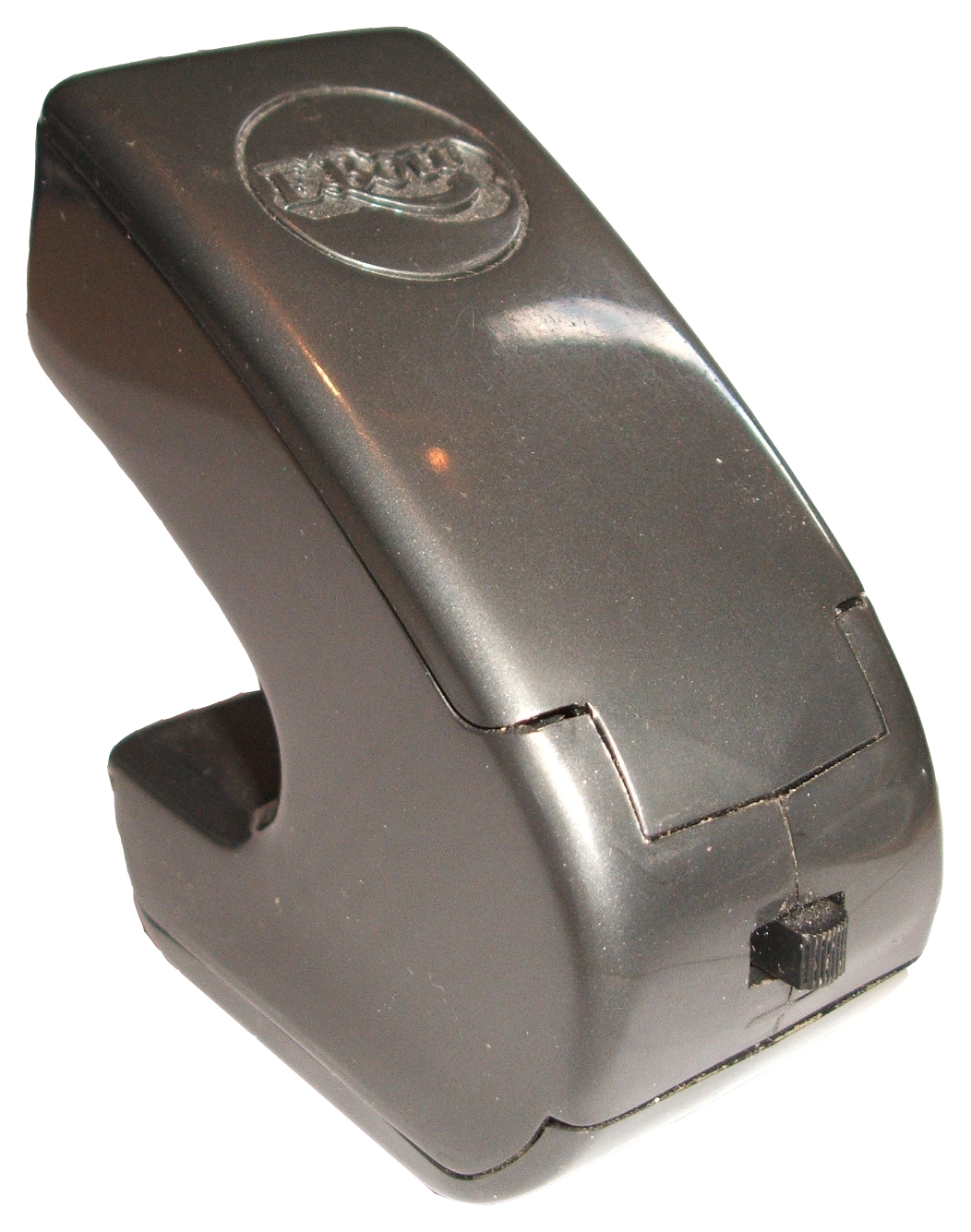
An EBow guitar string resonator

EBow is a brand name of Heet Sound Products, of Los Angeles, California, for a small, handheld, battery-powered resonator. The Ebow was invented by Greg Heet, as a way to make a note on an electric guitar string resonate continuously, creating an effect that sounds similar to cello or violin. The resonator uses a pickup feedback circuit, including a sensor coil, driver coil, and amplifier, to induce forced string resonance. The Ebow is monophonic, so it drives only one string at a time.

Other handheld and mounted guitar and bass resonators produced in Germany under the SRG brand were on the market since the early 1990s through 2016. These were available in both monophonic (one string at a time) and polyphonic (multiple strings at a time) models, and included multiple onboard trigger switch effects, such as HPF (high pass filter) for enhancing harmonics and producing feedback effects, and LPF (low pass filter), producing a bass boost with a cello sound on heavy gauge strings. Later EBow models, such as the plus Ebow, contain a mode slide switch on the back, which allows the player to either produce just sustain or overtone feedback in addition to sustain. Pedals such as the Boss DF-2 and FB-2 use an internally generated signal matched to the pitch of the guitar that can be sustained indefinitely by depressing the pedal. Many compressor pedals are often also marketed as sustainer pedals. As a note is sustained, it loses energy and volume due to diminishing vibration in the string. The compressor pedal boosts its electrical signal to the specified dynamic range, prolonging the duration of the note. This, combined with heavy distortion and the close proximity of the guitar and the speaker cabinet, can lead to infinite sustain at higher volumes.

=== Other effects ===
Envelope follower: An envelope follower activates an effect once a designated volume is reached. One effect that uses an envelope follower is the auto-wah, which produces a wah effect depending on how loud or soft the notes are being played.

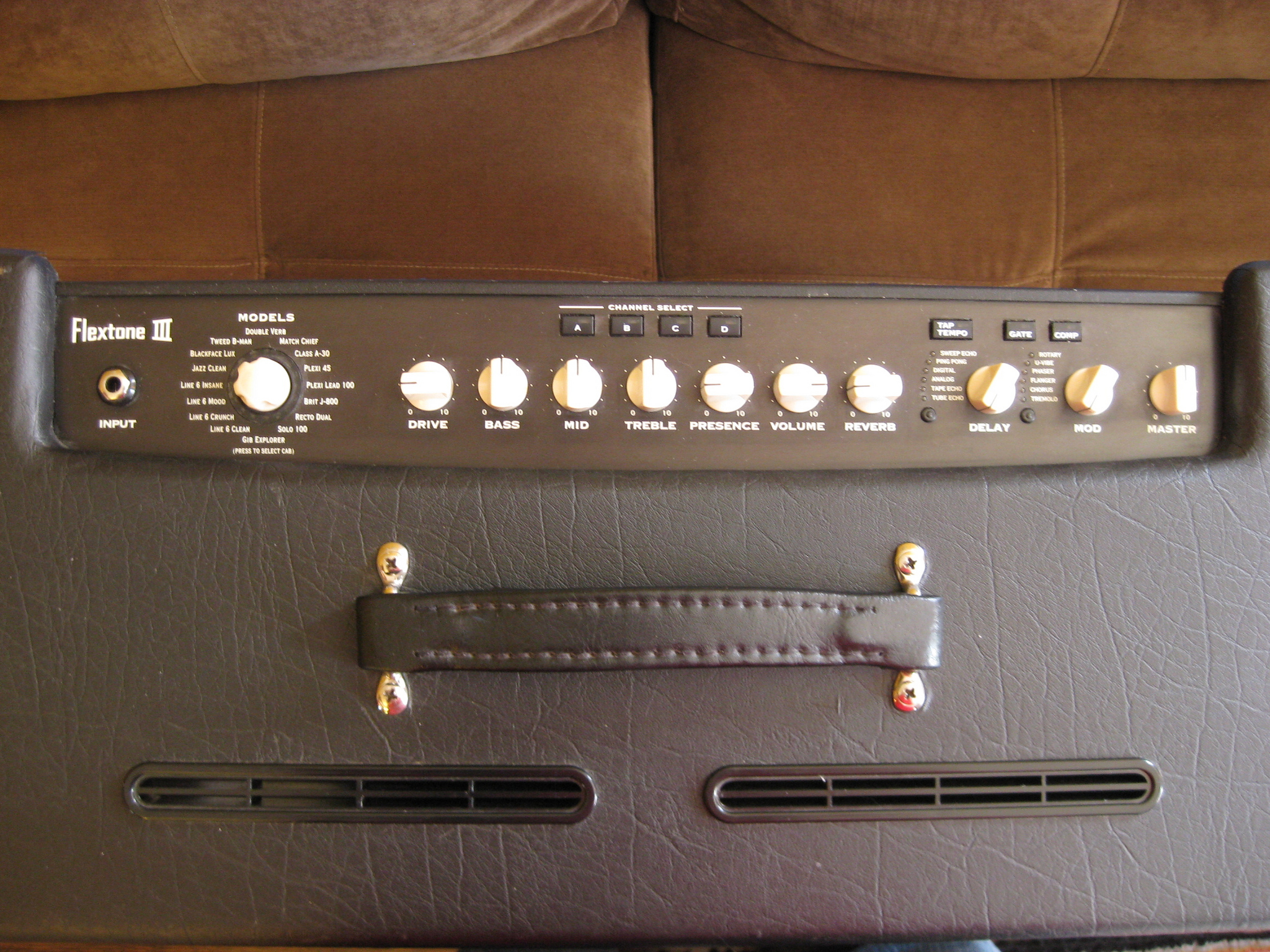
A Line 6 modeling amplifier shown from above. Note the various amplifier and speaker emulations selectable via the rotary knob on the left.

Guitar amplifier modeling: Amplifier modeling is a digital effect that replicates the sound of various amplifiers, most often vintage tube amplifiers and famous brands of speaker cabinets. Sophisticated modeling effects can simulate different types of speaker cabinets (e.g., the sound of an 8x10 inch cabinet) and miking techniques. A rotary speaker simulator mimics the doppler and chorus effect sound of a vintage Leslie speaker system by replicating its volume and pitch modulations, overdrive capacity and phase shifts.

Pitch correction and related vocal effects: Pitch correction effects use signal-processing algorithms to re-tune faulty intonation in a vocalist's performance or create unusual vocoder-type vocal effects. One of the best known examples of this is Autotune, a software program and effect unit which can be used to both correct pitch and add vocal effects.

Simulators: Simulators enable electric guitars to mimic the sound of other instruments such as acoustic guitar, electric bass and sitar. Pick up simulators used on guitars with single-coil pick ups replicate the sound of guitars with humbucker pick ups, or vice versa. A de-fretter is a bass guitar effect that simulates the sound of a fretless bass. The effect uses an envelope-controlled filter and voltage-controlled amplifier to soften a note's attack both in volume and timbre.

Bitcrusher filters: Bitcrushers rely on an analog to digital conversion of the audio signal and the reduction of sound fidelity by utilizing bit depths and sample rates low enough to cause significant colouration and filtering within the audible frequency range.

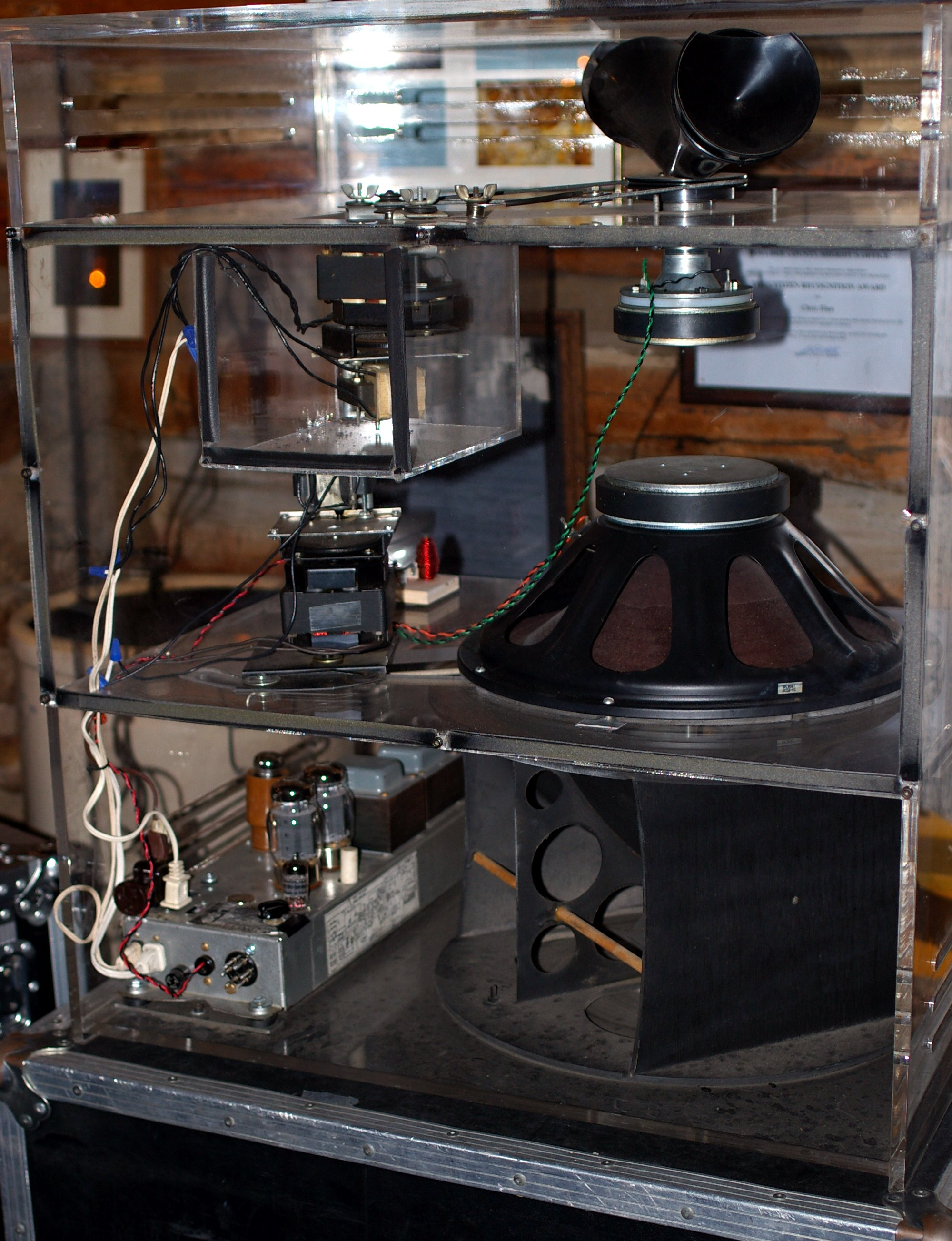
A Leslie rotary speaker in a clear plastic cabinet. Typically, the Leslie is housed in a wooden cabinet.

Leslie speakers are specially constructed amplifier and loudspeakers used to create special audio effects by rotating the speakers or a sound-directing duct to introduce the Doppler effect and other sound reflections. The rotating speaker baffle creates a chorus-type effect. Named after its inventor, Donald Leslie, it is particularly associated with the Hammond organ but is used with a variety of instruments as well as vocals. The Hammond/Leslie combination has become an element in many genres of music.

The Korg Kaoss Pad is a small MIDI controller, sampler, and effects processor for audio and musical instruments. The Kaoss Pad's touchpad can be used to control its internal effects engine, which can be applied to a line-in signal or to samples. Effects types include pitch shifting, distortion, filtering, wah-wah, tremolo, flanging, delay, reverberation, auto-panning, gating, phasing, and ring modulation.

== Bass effects ==
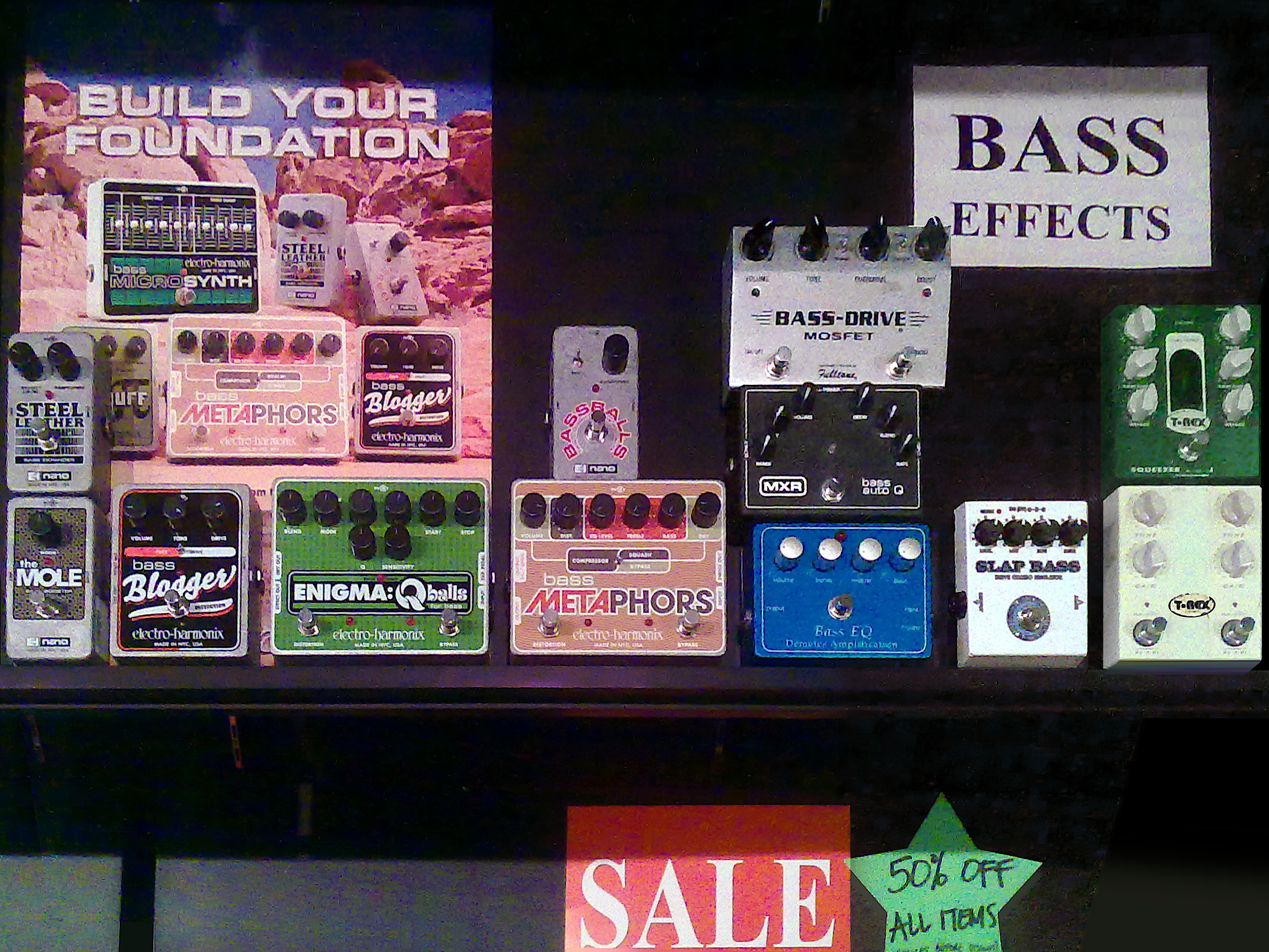
A selection of bass effect pedals at a music store

Bass effects are electronic effects units that are designed for use with the low pitches created by an electric bass or for an upright bass used with a bass amp or PA system. Two examples of bass effects are fuzz bass and bass chorus. Some bass amplifiers have built-in effects, such as overdrive or chorus. Upright bassists in jazz, folk, blues and similar genres may use a bass preamplifier, a small electronic device that matches the impedance between the piezoelectric pickup and the amp or PA system. Bass preamps also allow for the gain of the signal to be boosted or cut. Some models also offer equalization controls, a compressor, and a DI box connection.

== Boutique pedals ==
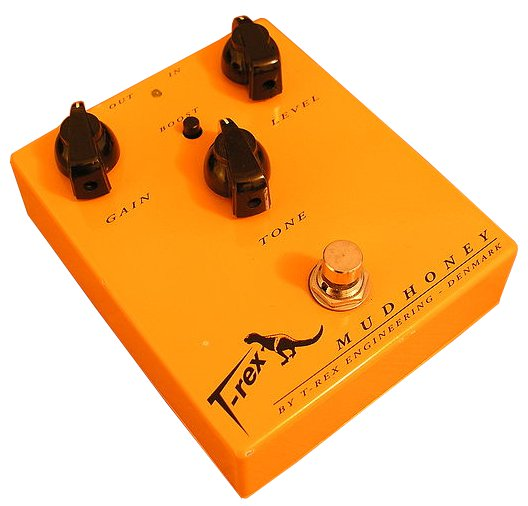
T-Rex brand "Mudhoney" overdrive pedal

Boutique pedals are designed by smaller, independent companies and are typically produced in limited quantities. Some may even be hand-made, with hand-soldered connections. These pedals are mainly distributed online or through mail-order, or sold in a few music stores. They are often more expensive than mass-produced pedals and offer higher-quality components, innovative designs, in-house-made knobs, and hand-painted artwork or etching. Some boutique companies focus on re-creating classic or vintage effects.

Examples of boutique pedal manufacturers include: BJFE, Pete Cornish, Emlyn Crowther, Death By Audio, Robert Keeley, Roger Linn, Roger Mayer, Strymon, T-Rex Engineering, ToadWorks, and Z.Vex Effects.

There is also a niche market for modifying or modding effects. Vendors provide either custom modification services or sell new effects pedals they have already modified. The Ibanez Tube Screamer, Boss DS-1, Pro Co RAT and DigiTech Whammy are some of the most often-modified effects. Common modifications include value changes in capacitors or resistors, adding true-bypass so that the effect's circuitry is no longer in the signal path, substituting higher-quality components, replacing the unit's original operational amplifiers (op-amps), or adding functions to the device, such as allowing additional control of some factor or adding another output jack.

== Other pedals and rackmount units ==
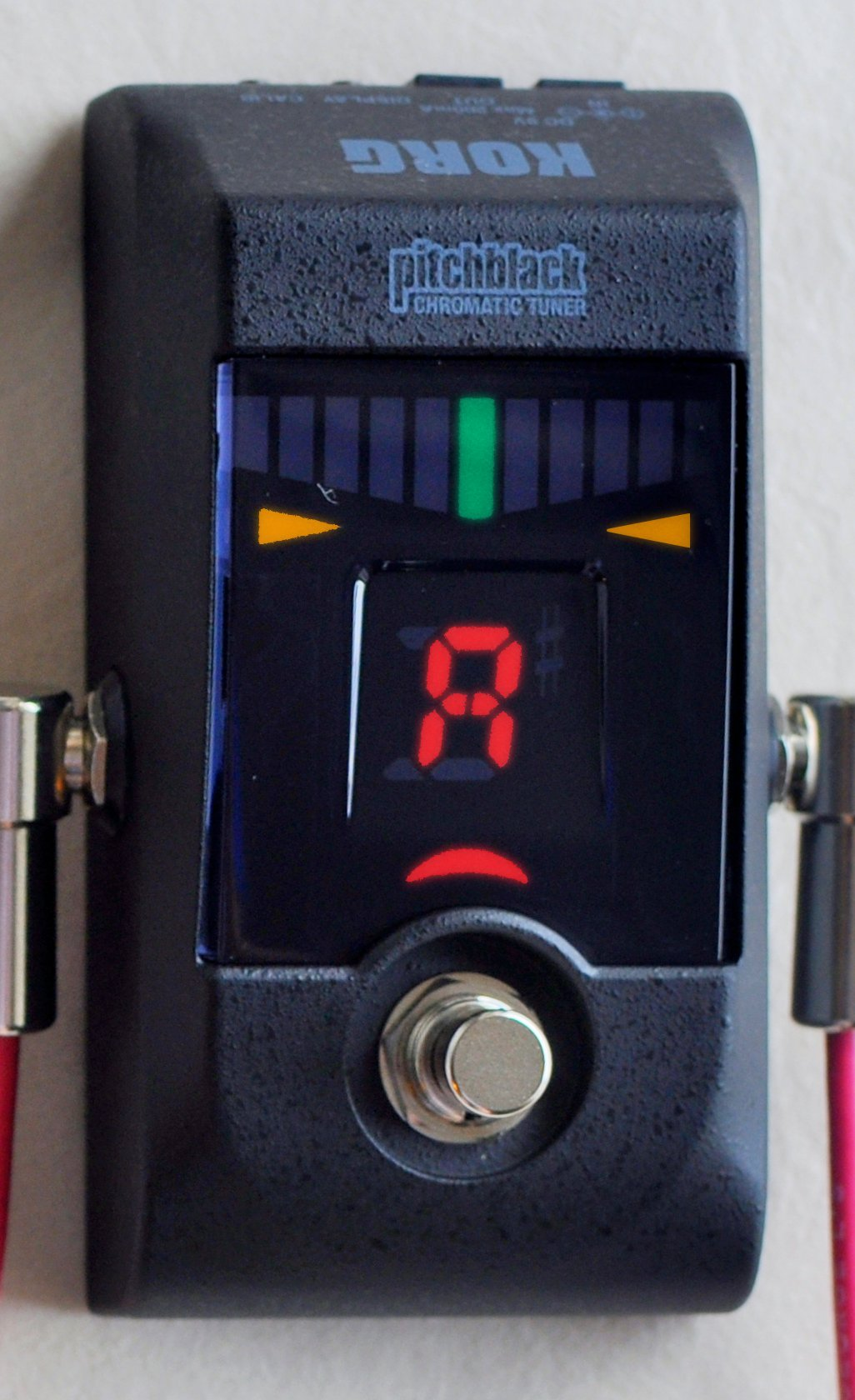
Some rock and pop guitarists and bassists use stompbox format electronic tuners.

Not all stompboxes and rack-mounted electronic devices designed for musicians are effects. Strobe tuner and regular electronic tuner pedals indicate whether a guitar string is too sharp or flat. Stompbox-format tuner pedals route the electric signal for the instrument through the unit via a 1/4-inch patch cable. These pedal-style tuners usually have an output so that the signal can be plugged into a guitar amp to produce sound.

Rack-mount power conditioner devices deliver a voltage of the proper level and characteristics to enable equipment to function properly (e.g., by providing surge suppression). A rack-mounted wireless receiver unit is used to enable a guitarist or bassist to move around on stage without being connected to a cable. A pedal routing switch routes a guitar signal to an amplifier or enables a performer to switch between two guitars or between two amplifiers.

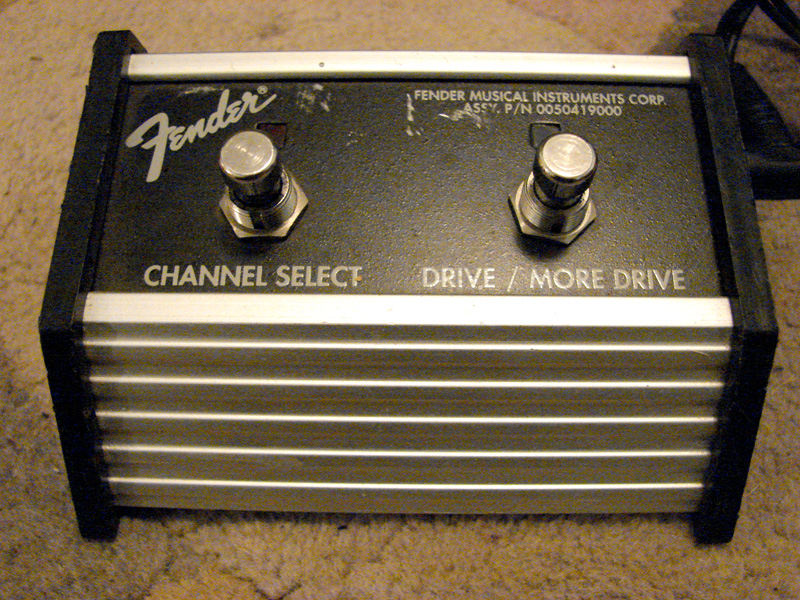
This footswitch controls an effect (distortion), but it is not an effects pedal as the case does not contain effects circuitry; it is just a switch.

Guitar amplifiers and electronic keyboards may have switch pedals for turning built-in reverb and distortion effects on and off; the pedals contain only a switch, with the circuitry for the effect being housed in the amplifier chassis.

Some musicians who use rackmounted effects or laptops employ a MIDI controller pedalboard or armband remote controls to trigger sound samples, switch between different effects or control effect settings.

A pedal keyboard uses pedals, but it is not an effect unit; it is a foot-operated musical keyboard typically used to play basslines.

== Notable manufacturers ==
- BJFE/One Control/Mad Professor (Note: Also an amplifier manufacturer)
- Chase Bliss Audio
- Danelectro (Note: Also an instrument and amplifier manufacturer)
- Darkglass Electronics
- DOD Electronics/DigiTech
- Dunlop Manufacturing/Way Huge/Cry Baby/MXR
- EarthQuaker Devices
- Electro-Harmonix
- Eventide Inc.
- Fender
- Frantone Electronics
- Fulltone
- Ibanez
- JHS Pedals
- Keeley Electronics
- Maxon Effects
- Meris
- Mooer Audio
- Morley Pedals
- Mu-Tron
- Roland/Boss Corporation
- Seymour Duncan
- Source Audio
- Strymon
- Supro
- T-Rex Engineering
- TC Electronic/Behringer
- Tech 21
- Teisco
- Universal Audio
- Vox
- Wampler Pedals
- Z.Vex Effects
- Zoom Corporation

No note indicates that the manufacturer specializes in effects only

== See also ==
- Acoustic wave § See also — a list of non-electronic audio effects
- Category:Audio effects
- Frequency divider
- Frequency mixer
- Nonlinear filter
- Outboard gear — effects units used in the context of audio mixing
- Sound effect
- Vintage musical equipment
