= Meris (company) =

Audio effects manufacturer

- Type: Private
- Industry: Guitar Effects Pedals
- Founded: 2013; 13 years ago in Los Angeles, California, U.S.
- Founders: Terry Burton
- Headquarters: Los Angeles, California, U.S.
- Products: Effects pedals
- Website: meris.us

Meris is a maker of 500 series modules and effects pedals. The company is based in Los Angeles and manufactures its products in the United States.

== 500 series ==
Meris makes audio modules in the Automated Processes 500 series form factor, including a mic preamp, a reverb, and a decimation effect.

== Pedals ==
Meris also makes effects pedals, including an award-winning version of their 500 series reverb effect, as well as a pitch shifter, a delay, and a synthesizer.

In 2020 a reverb pedal created in collaboration with Chase Bliss was announced.

In 2022, Meris released the LVX, a modular delay system, allowing users to build their own delay effects, customizable with modulation, filtering, preamps, and effects. Along with additional effects, the user can route control signals to different parameters. The LVX won FutureMusic's Gear of the Year and Power Award for its modular abilities.

== Products ==
- Enzo: Multi-voice Synthesizer
- Polymoon: Modulated Delay [inspired by rack delays]
- Hedra: 3 Voice Pitch Shifting Delay
- Ottobit Jr.: Bitcrusher
- Mercury 7: Ambient reverb [inspired by Vangelis' Blade Runner soundtrack]
- MercuryX: Modular Reverb system, an expansion on the Mercury 7 in the LVX form-factor.
- LVX: Modular Delay System
- CXM 1978 [in collaboration with Chase Bliss Audio]: a modern take on the Lexicon 224
- Enzo X: Expansion from the original Enzo

== Bibliography ==
- Bjørn, Kim; Harper, Scott (2019). Pedal Crush. Bjooks. pp. 352–354. ISBN 9788799999521.
