= Line 6 DL4 =

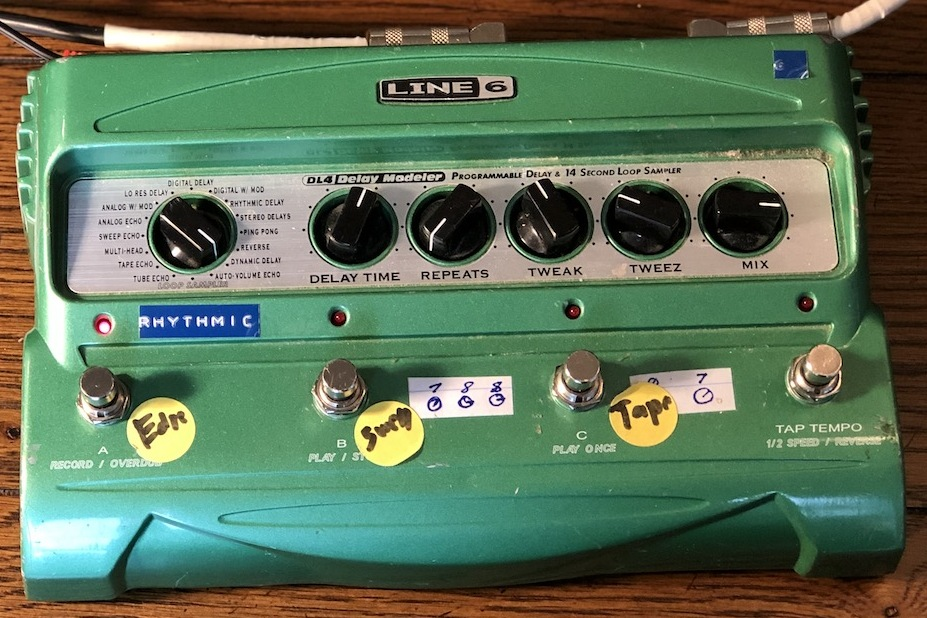
Line 6 DL4 Delay with handwritten notes about the various presets on the pedal.

The DL4 Delay Modeler by Line 6, introduced in 1999, is a digital delay pedal. It is one of the first digital modeling effects units. The DL4 features models of 16 vintage delay effects, including the Echoplex, Roland Corporation's Space Echo, and the Electro-Harmonix Deluxe Memory Man. It also has a 14 second looping function. According to a May/June 2000 review in Canadian Musician, it "delivers a cavalcade of features for a reasonable price." In 2018, Pitchfork called it "quietly the most important guitar pedal of the last 20 years."

The DL4 was spearheaded by product designers by Greg Westall, Jeff Slingluff, and Patrick O’Connor. The original concept was a four preset design modeled in size and shape after the BOSS CE-1. Later, Jeorge Trips, who was originally hired to procure vintage pedals for study, made the suggestion that the fourth pedal be used for a built in tap tempo button instead of using an external jack.

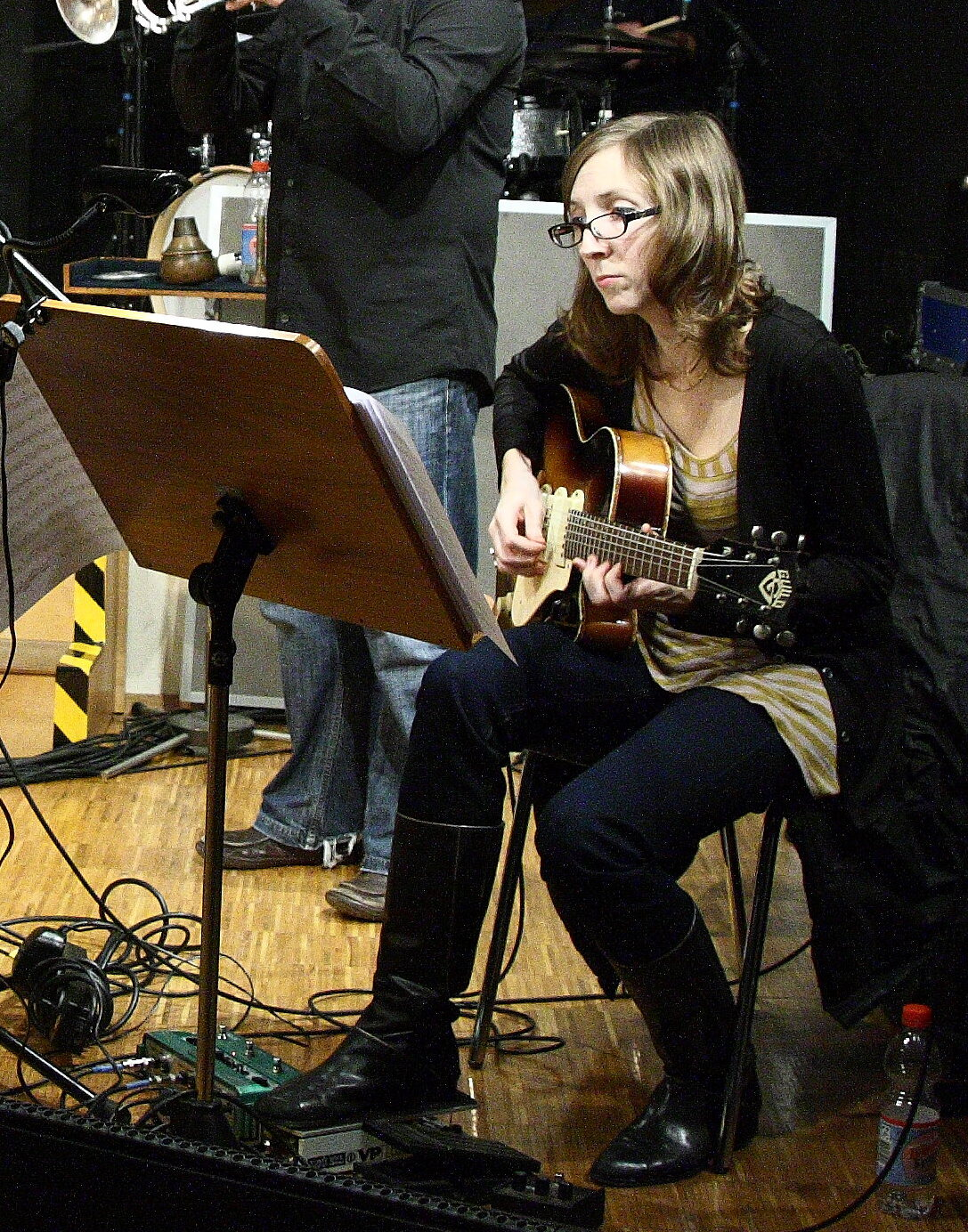
Mary Halvorson using a DL4 with an expression pedal

The engineering team for the DL-4 consisted of Michel Doidic, Nigel Redmon, and Jeff Slingluff. All of the Sound Design was created by Jeff Slingluff including original and often imitated sounds like Sweep Echo. Towards the later stages of the DL-4 development Jeorge Trips was hired as Product Manager for the DL-4. In addition to the concept of the built in tap tempo button Jeorge played a key role in spearheading the looper functionality.
