= T-Rex Engineering =

Danish manufacturer of electric guitar effects pedals

Coordinates: 55.6785°N 9.5811°E

T-Rex Effects
- Company type: Anpartsselskab
- Industry: Guitar effects
- Founded: 1996; 30 years ago
- Founder: Lars Dahl-Jorgensen; Sebastian Jensen
- Headquarters: Vejle, Jutland, Denmark
- Area served: Global
- Key people: Lars Dahl-Jorgensen; Sebastian Jensen; Steen Meldgaard Laursen
- Products: Electric guitar effects pedals
- Website: t-rex-effects.com

T-Rex ApS is a manufacturer of handmade electric guitar effects pedals.

Based in the town of Vejle, Denmark, T-Rex Engineering was founded in 1995 or 1996 (Note: While company brochures give 1995 as the year of T-Rex's founding, the company website alternates between 1995 and 1996.) by Lars Dahl-Jorgensen and Sebastian Jensen.
