= Fender Reverb Unit =

Spring reverb effects unit

The Fender Reverb Unit (6G15) was a vacuum tube, spring reverb-equipped effects unit made by Fender. The Reverb Unit was originally introduced in 1961. It was discontinued in 1966 and was replaced by a solid-state model, the FR1000. The unit features three controls: Dwell, Mixer and Tone and includes a 12AT7 tube as a preamplifier; a 6K6 tube as the reverb driver; and a 12AX7 as the reverb recovery tube. The rectifier is a diode-type solid state unit. The circuit board, like Fender's Brownface, Blackface and Silverface amplifiers is an eyelet board and the unit its completely hand wired.

The spring reverb “tank” is mounted on the interior side of the front baffle in a vertical position. Tanks were supplied by Gibbs and Accutronics in the original version. The vertically mounted tank should be a 4AB3C1C (last letter in Accutronics model designation indicates tank orientation) but most actually shipped with 4AB3C1B tanks which are designed for horizontal mounting; these are the same ones found in the Fender combo amps where it is mounted on the floor in a horizontal configuration.

Physically, the unit looks like a small amplifier head and since the early 1960s the unit has become synonymous with surf music.

== 1976–1978 ==
The "Tube Reverb" was reintroduced in 1976 with a silver control panel ("Silverface"). It was discontinued in 1978. This reissue differs significantly from the original 6G15 circuit. The unit has 4 tubes: V1 (Input/preamplifier, a 12AX7 as opposed to a 12AT7 in the earlier three-tube version), V2 (reverb driver, a 6V6 as opposed to a 6K6 in the original), V3 (reverb recovery, a 12AX7), and V4 (a buffer stage, using another 12AX7). V4 acts to reduce changes in output impedance when the wet-dry mix is varied, ameliorating the “tone suck” (loss of volume and some high frequency signal) seen with the original and later reissue 3 tube versions. Further, the 6V6 driver was wired with fixed bias (as opposed to cathode biased in the 6G15 circuit) and in triode mode (with plate and grid connected).

== Reissue (1994-2016) ==
A reissue of the original tube reverb was introduced in 1994 and manufactured through 2016. Some changes in the circuit were made to accommodate a 6V6 reverb driver tube, replacing the obsolete 6K6. Reissues also have two printed circuit boards (potentiometers are mounted on the smaller of the two) and a mix of hand wiring and spade connectors. It is available with white, black or brown tolex. Fender also now makes a tweed-covered Reverb Unit to match its Tweed amplifiers of the 1950s.
