= Frantone Electronics =

Effects pedal manufacturer

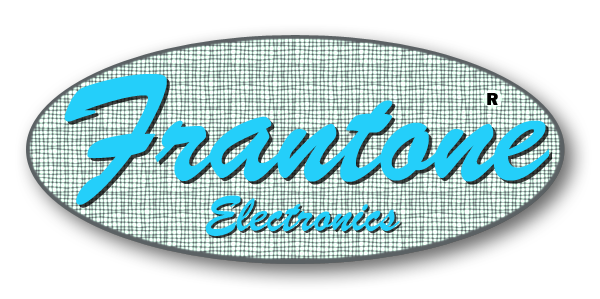
- Company type: Sole proprietorship
- Industry: Music technology
- Founded: 1994; 32 years ago in Lancaster, Pennsylvania
- Founder: Fran Blanche
- Headquarters: Philadelphia, Pennsylvania, United States
- Area served: Worldwide
- Products: Effects units
- Website: www.frantone.com

Frantone Electronics is an American Philadelphia-based hand-made effects pedal manufacturer founded and run by Fran Blanche. Blanche operates a YouTube channel where she discusses the company's history and showcases various electronics projects.

== History ==
Frantone Electronics was founded in 1994 in Lancaster, Pennsylvania by Fran Blanche, a self-taught electronic engineer. The company was one of the world's first boutique guitar effects companies. Over the years, the company's boutique pedals would be used by notable musicians including Lou Reed and R.E.M. The company's growth was never steady; Blanche moved Frantone repeatedly, being gentrified out of several NYC-area locations.

In the early 1990s, Blanche built an effects pedal for herself named the "Fuzzy-Wuzzy". She subsequently founded Frantone and designed the Hep Cat, the company's first commercial product, which was followed by more pedal designs in the years to follow. Blanche took a hiatus from operating Frantone and worked at Electro-Harmonix, from about 1997 through 2000, where she designed the company's 2000 version of the Big Muff pedal. Blanche also went on hiatus from Frantone in 2009, but revived the company in a 2016 Kickstarter campaign to restart production of her Cream Puff pedal.

After some years out of production, the company announced the release of new pedals in 2017 as well as reintroductions of the Peach Fuzz and Cream Puff designs as limited editions. In 2021, Fran announced in a video on her channel that she will no longer be manufacturing the pedals herself, although she is open to a licensing deal.

== Fran Blanche ==
Blanche is a trans woman and strong supporter of the LGBTQ+ community. In the video "When Google Calls you a Slur" in which she demonstrates Google's search engine auto populating the suggested term "Is Fran Blanche a tranvestite?"; she addresses this as a slur, prompting her subscriber and fanbase to mass contact Google to rectify the search results. The video got the attention of Google and as of May 1, 2022, this term no longer appears in Google searches for Fran Blanche or Frantone.

She is a Senior Member of the IEEE since April 2021.

She has two Youtube channels: One is FranLab, where she discusses and demonstrates vintage electronics, and the other is Frantone, which includes the making and maintenance of her Frantone guitar pedals, along with some music she and others have performed with them.

Fran has played guitar for many years and has previously performed as lead guitarist in a band called the Mysterons.
