= Strymon (company) =

Audio equipment manufacturer

- Type: Music Instruments
- Industry: Guitar Effects Pedals
- Founded: 2004
- Headquarters: Westlake Village, California, United States
- Website: strymon.net

Strymon is an American manufacturer of audio equipment, originally called Damage Control Engineering. It is best known for its line of high-end guitar effects pedals that use a mixture of analog circuitry and digital signal processing. The company is based in Westlake Village, California, and manufactures products in the United States.

== Products ==
Under the Damage Control name, the company's product line included several guitar preamps, distortions, multi-effects, and delays that utilized tubes within the pedals themselves.

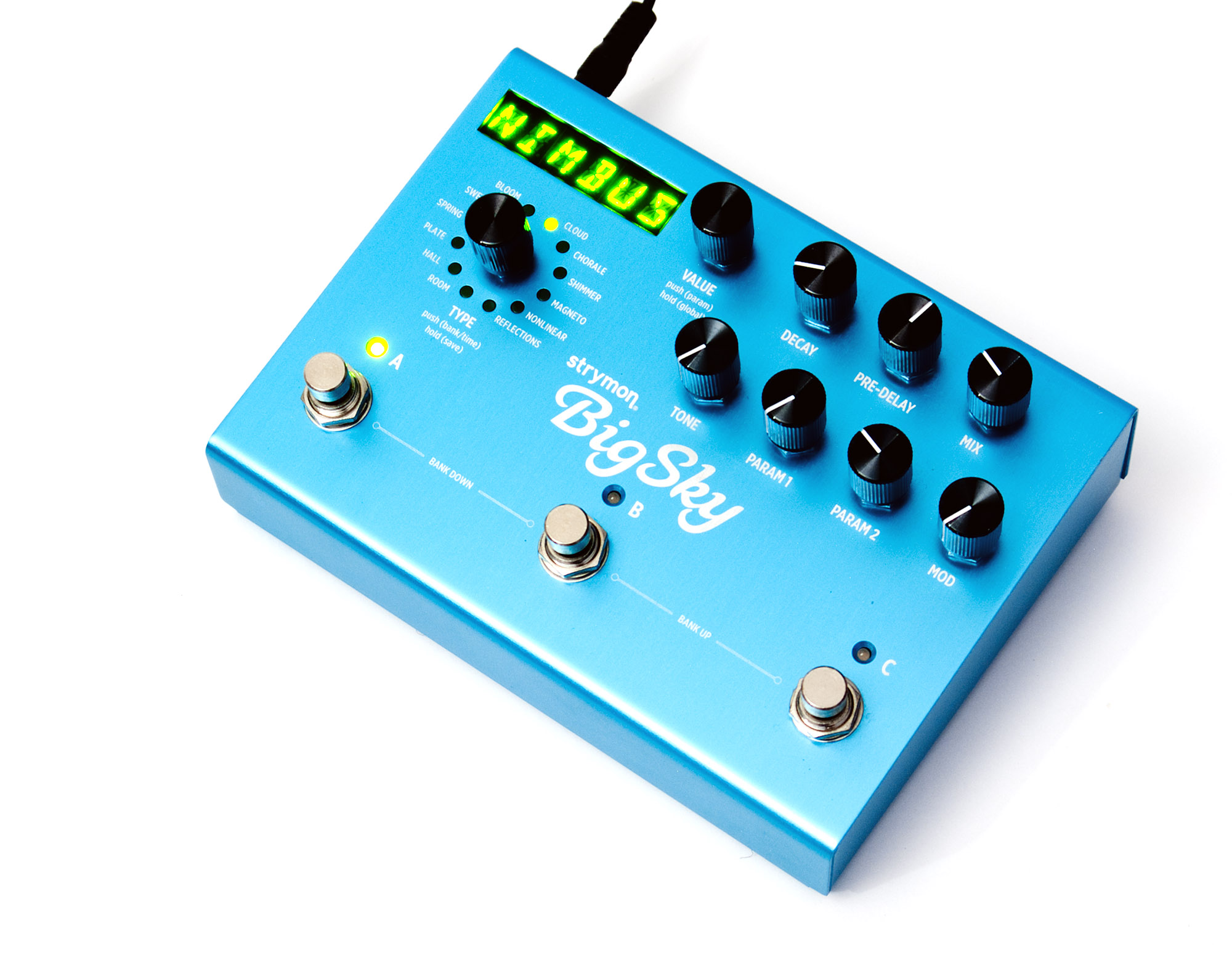
A Strymon BigSky reverb pedal

The Strymon product line includes distortion, delay, reverb, chorus, flanger, and compressor pedals for guitar.

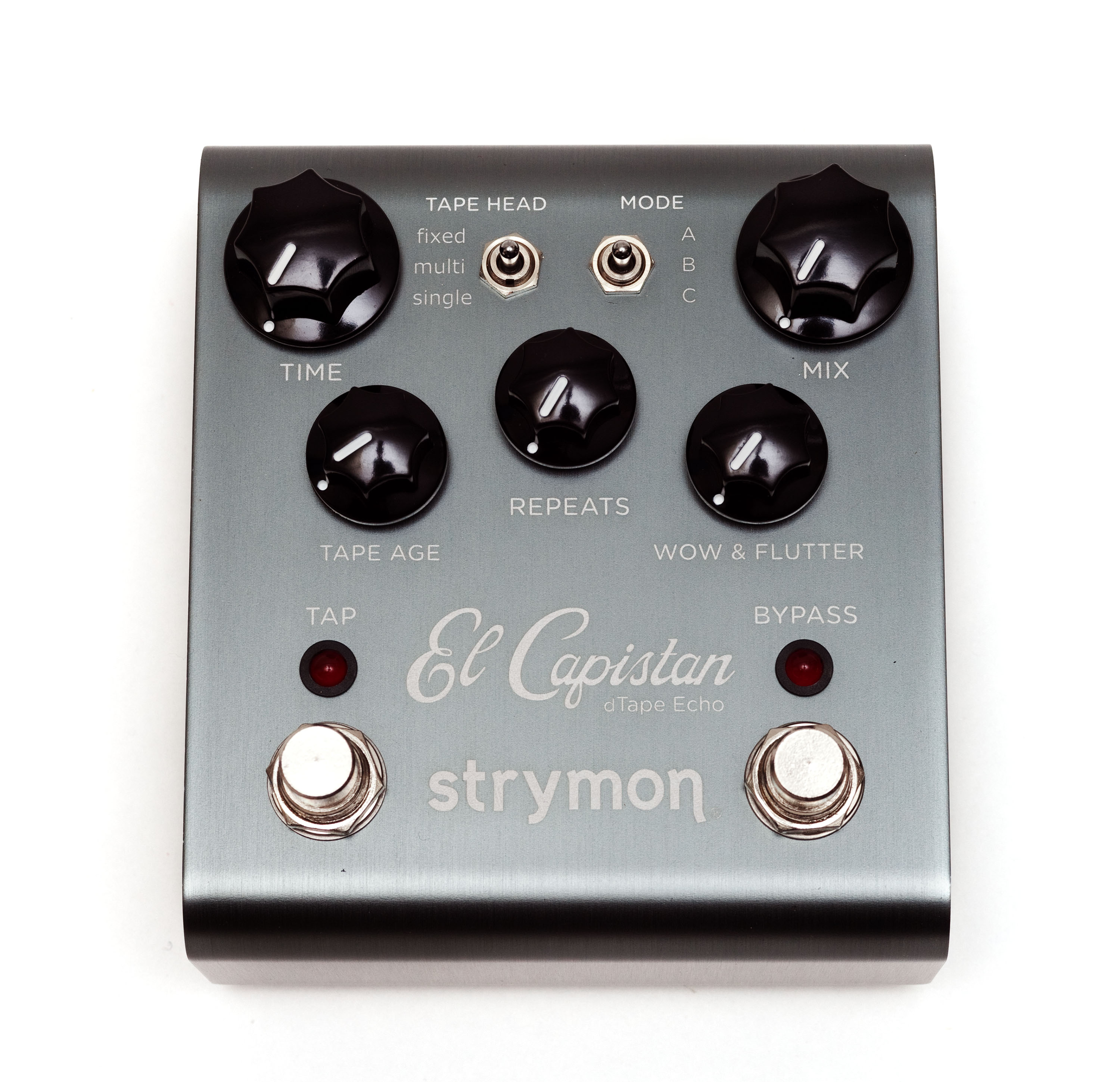
A Strymon El Capistan delay pedal
