= Slicer (guitar effect) =

Percussive and rhythmic effect

A slicer is an effects unit which is similar to a tremolo, vibrato, phaser, or autopan. It combines a modulation sequence with a noise gate or envelope filter to create a percussive and rhythmic effect like a helicopter, with rapid cutting out and coming in—on and off. Most have variable speeds and depths, creating different sounds. It may be implemented through an effects unit or a VST. The Boss SL-20 is an example of a slicer effect in a guitar pedal.
