= BJFE =

Swedish manufacturing company

- Company type: Limited liability company
- Industry: Guitar effects pedals
- Founded: 2000
- Founder: Björn Juhl
- Headquarters: Stockholm, Sweden
- Website: https://one-control.com/

BJFE is a Swedish company that manufactures effects pedals for use with electric guitar and bass. Founded in 2000 by Björn Juhl, "BJFE" stands for Björn Juhl Förstärkarelektronik (Swedish for Björn Juhl Amplifier Electronics). Pedal types include distortion, overdrive, vibrato, compression, and equalization. The company's pedals are handmade by Juhl, while his wife Eva paints the lettering and pictures. BJFE pedals typically follow a color-based naming scheme and an adjective to describe the sound. Due to their being hand-built in limited quantities, these pedals are considered "boutique" guitar effects.

== History ==
BJF Electronics initially started in June 1999 as an amp repair business. Juhl often handled difficult cases that other repairmen considered hopeless. In 2000, Juhl displayed three effects pedals at a trade show and then teamed up with Custom Sounds in Stockholm to begin a distribution partnership. Juhl has partnered with other companies to distribute models based on his designs in order to reach a larger market, including One Control and Mad Professor.
