= Univox Super-Fuzz =

Fuzzbox produced by the Univox company

The Univox Super-Fuzz was a fuzzbox produced by the Univox company, primarily for use with the electric guitar or bass.

== History ==
=== Origin ===
The circuit was designed in the late 1960s by the Japanese company Honey, in the form of a multi effect called the Honey Psychedelic Machine. Later on, Honey was taken on by Shin-ei, who produced the effect separately (who also produced another well known fuzz box, the Shin-ei Companion FY-2) and imported in the USA by Unicord. The first Super-Fuzzes were made in 1968, and production continued until the late 70s.

=== Design ===
The first units were made in a simple stamped sheet metal box, painted grey, with a blue metal Univox sticker on the top. Around 1970 production was changed to a die-cast metal box, with a large pedal featuring a rubber cover that had the words "Super-Fuzz" embossed on it. The first die cast units were either grey or black, with a green or black foot pedal. Around 1973 or so, they were all produced with an orange pedal, with a green or blue foot pedal. The later models also featured an internal trim pot for controlling the octave balance.

=== Alternative manufacturers ===
Although the Univox units are the most well-known incarnation of this circuit, Shin-ei licensed this circuit out to dozens of manufacturers.

== Sound ==
This fuzz is an octave fuzz using two germanium diodes to produce square wave clipping.

The controls are 'Balance' (volume), 'Expander' (fuzz amount), a two position 'tone' switch, and an on/off footswitch on top.

There are two unique features of this device that set it apart from other distortion and fuzz pedals. The first is that the full-wave rectification of the circuit produces an upper octave as well as a slight lower octave. This also gives the sound a lot of compression and gives a mild ring modulator effect. The second unique feature is a tone switch that engages a 1 kHz filter that "scoops" the mids, giving a very fat, almost bassy tone, unique to this circuit.

== Super-Fuzz users ==
Notable musicians who have used the Super-Fuzz include:

- Adam Yauch of Beastie Boys
- Billy Corgan of Smashing Pumpkins
- Billy Cox of Jimi Hendrix
- Chris Walla of Death Cab for Cutie
- Elliott Frazier of Ringo Deathstarr
- Gary Louris of The Jayhawks
- Hillel Slovak of Red Hot Chili Peppers
- J Mascis of Dinosaur Jr.
- Joe Denardo of Growing
- Jon Niederbrach of The Untold Fables
- Joe Preston of Thrones
- Josh Homme of Them Crooked Vultures, Queens of the Stone Age and Kyuss
- Jus Oborn of Electric Wizard
- Kurt Cobain of Nirvana
- Mark Arm and Steve Turner of Mudhoney
- Pete Townshend of The Who
- Poison Ivy of The Cramps
- Scott Hill of Fu Manchu
- Steve Hackett of Genesis (rebranded as the Shaftesbury Duo-Fuzz)
- Dave Stewart of Hatfield and the North (rebranded as the Shaftesbury Duo-Fuzz)
- Tony McPhee of The Groundhogs
- Paul Vinegar of Jahbulong
- David Shannon of Cheater Slicks
- Josh Hamby of From Zero To Zed

== See also ==
- List of distortion pedals
