= Keeley Electronics =

American manufacturer of effect units for electric guitars

- Company type: Private
- Industry: Musical instruments
- Founded: 2001; 25 years ago
- Headquarters: Oklahoma City, Oklahoma
- Key people: Robert Keeley
- Products: Effects units
- Website: RobertKeeley.com

Keeley Electronics is an American manufacturer of effect units for electric guitars. The company, founded by Robert Keeley and operating from Oklahoma City, Oklahoma, started with the Keeley Compressor pedal along with modifications for effects by Boss and Ibanez.

== History ==
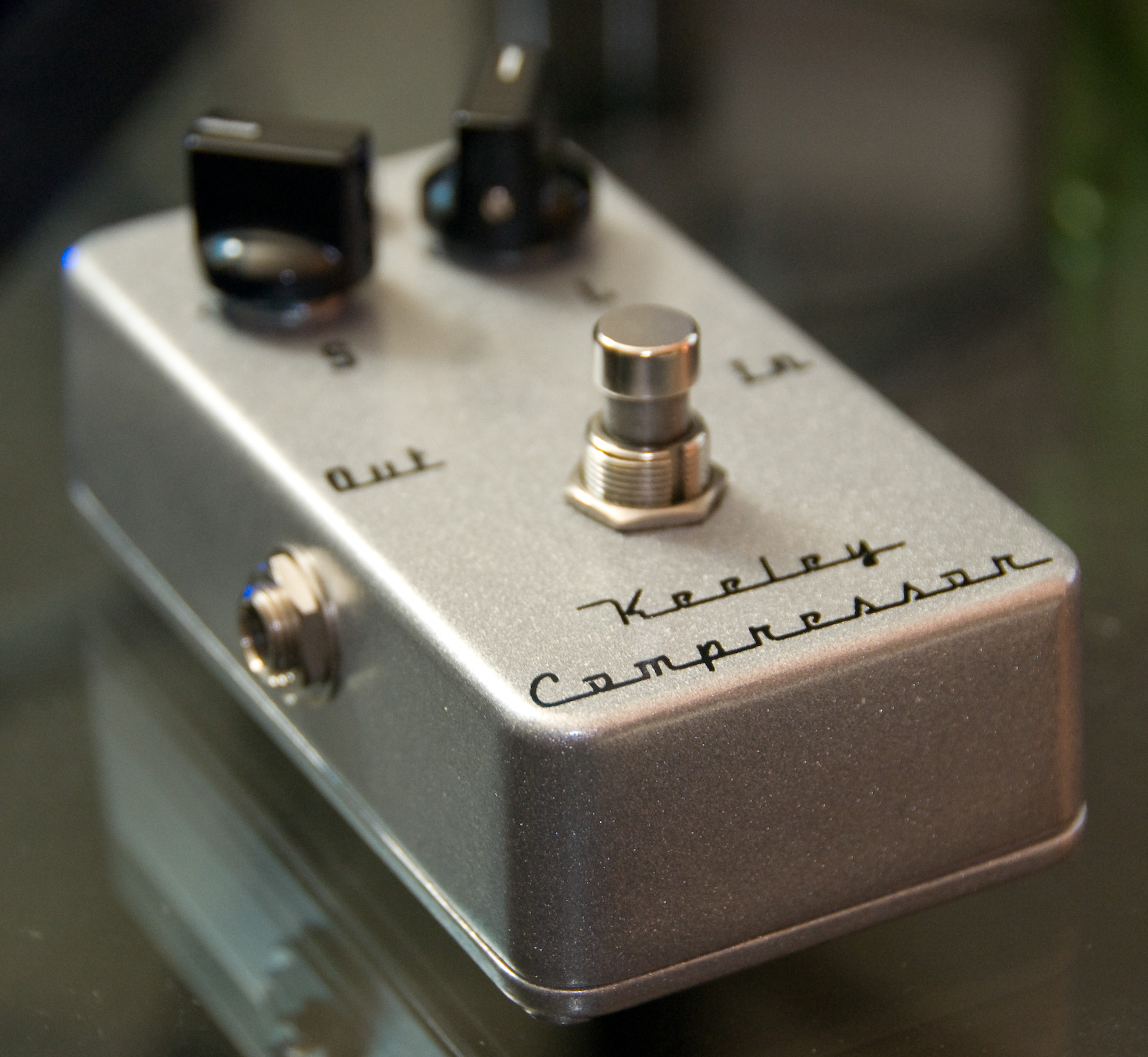
Keeley Compressor

After graduating in electrical engineering from the University of Oklahoma, Robert Keeley started his company from his home in Oklahoma City in 2001. He initially hoped to build guitar amplifiers (he tweaked his father's Peavey Deuce), but found the market "highly saturated and becoming more so every day". Instead, while teaching at a small technical college and employing "some of his best students", he rebuilt and modified old effects units, starting with a Ross compressor. The industry for makers of hand-built effects at the time had few major players (Keeley named Mike Piera of Analog Man and Mike Fuller from Fulltone as his only competitors), and his business soon took off, aided by a reputation for quality and customers such as Brad Paisley. Rebuilt versions of the Ibanez TS9 were used by Peter Frampton, Jon Herington and Ike Willis; Keeley said he got his ideas for improving and tweaking existing effect pedals by reading commentary on various forums for guitar players. Since then, he develops his own pedals, starting with a boost pedal; his most popular effect is a compressor (first built in 2001), selling more than 27,000 copies.

According to Guitar World, Keeley Electronics has grown into "one of the world’s top sellers of guitar effects pedals". Keeley claims that part of his success is due to carefully selecting electronic components with low tolerance. They opened up a second factory, where they make flight cases and guitar pickups; in 2009, the company briefly moved production of effect pedals there after a fire in the first factory.

Keeley still builds custom-ordered and modified effects; assignments include tweaking an MXR Phase 90 for Donald Fagen and building a combined distortion/blues driver/wah for Neil Zaza.

== Notable products ==
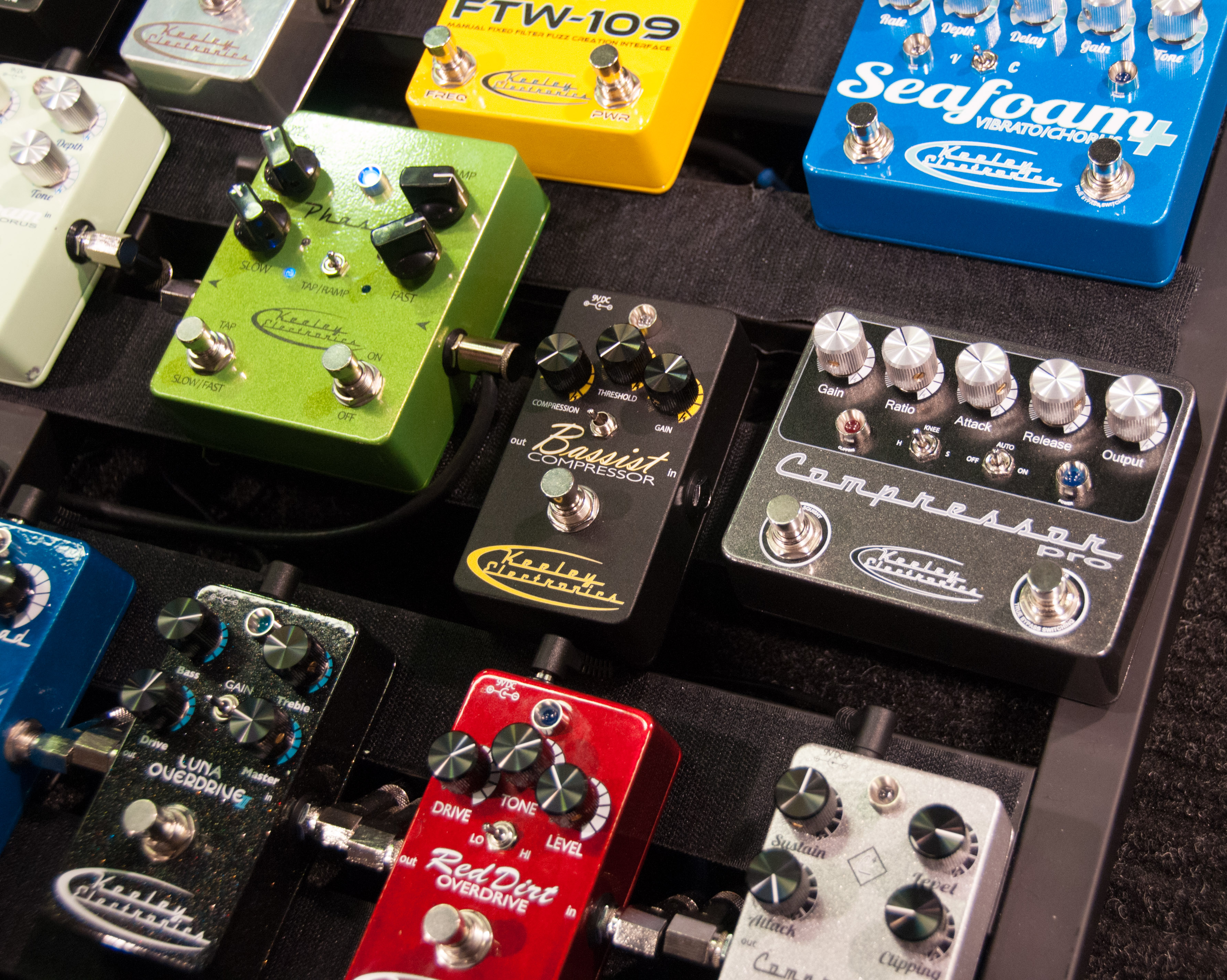
Keeley pedals at the 2014 NAMM Show: FTW-109 (Fuzz), Seafoam+ VibratoIChorus, Phaser (6 stage), Bassist Compressor, Compressor Pro, Luna II Overdrive, Red Dirt Overdrive, 4 Knob Compressor

- Compressor
- Dark Side, a multi-effect unit inspired by the work of David Gilmour and Pink Floyd.
- Framptone, an amplifier switcher and talk box developed in cooperation with Peter Frampton
- Fuzz Head, a fuzzbox
- Katana Clean Boost, Keeley's first self-made pedal, is a pre-amplifier used by Billy Gibbons and Dan Spitz
- Loomer, containing fuzz and reverb in one pedal. Its name and design were influenced by a song by the shoegaze band My Bloody Valentine
- Luna Overdrive, containing a Baxandall tone circuit, an op-amp, and a JFET circuit "voiced like a Fender or Marshall preamplifier circuit"
- Phaser, a digitally controlled six-stage analog Phaser

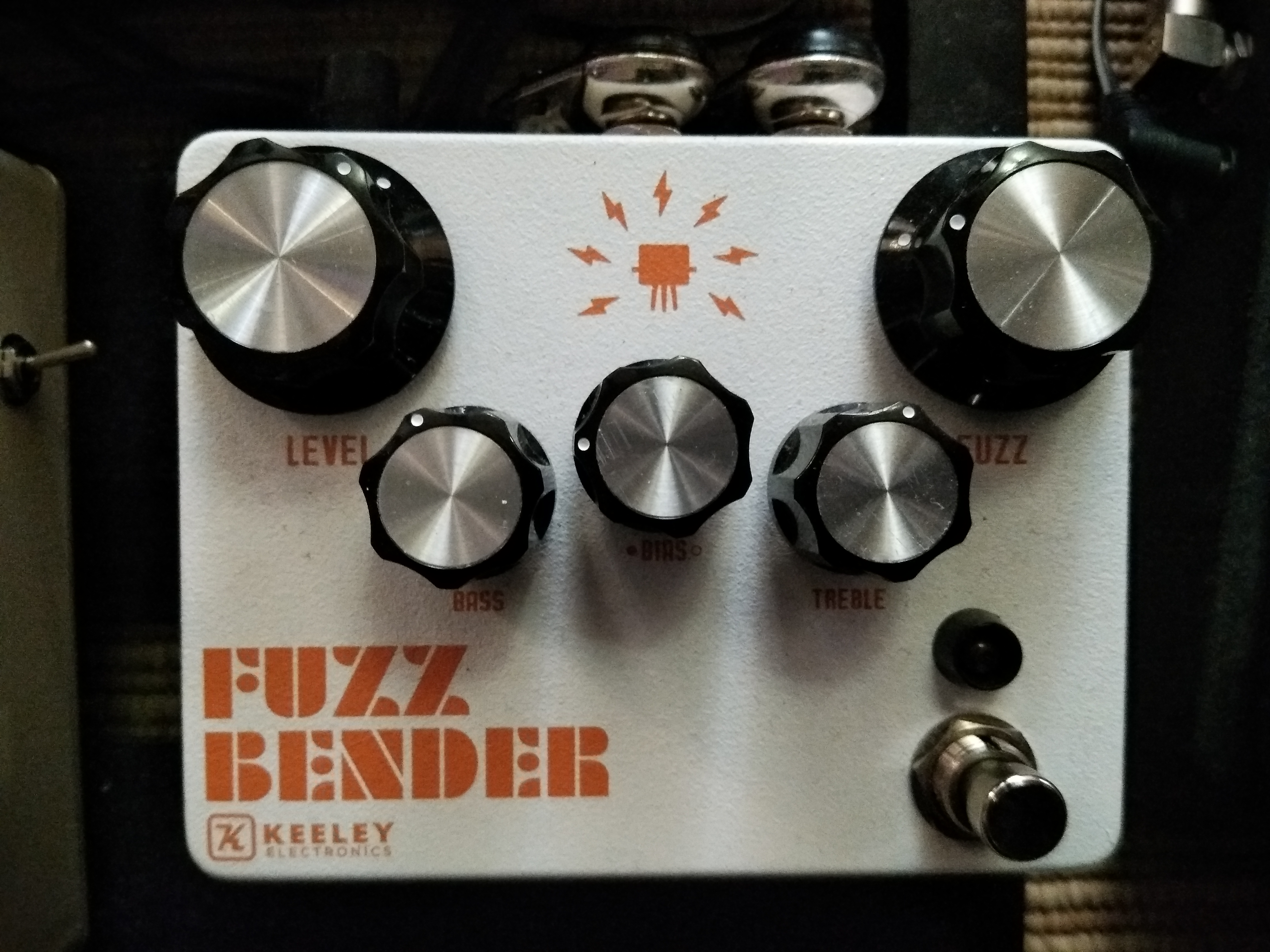
Keeley Fuzz Bender

== Modifications ==
- Boss BD-2 Blues Driver
- Ibanez Tube Screamer
- Mello Wah, modification to Dunlop Cry Baby
