= Shin-ei Companion FY-2 =

The Shin-ei Companion FY-2 is a discontinued fuzz pedal, made by the Japanese Shin-ei effects pedal company from the late 1960s to the early 1970s. The pedal is known for its raw, distinctive, gated fuzz. FY-2 pedals are now rare.

Different versions were made, most using silicon transistors and having a mid-cutting tone circuit that lowered the volume. An earlier, rarer, version used germanium transistors, which did not have the tone circuit, and therefore had a louder output. The sound from this version is very rich, fluid and thick.

The pedal has two knobs:

- "Volume" (controls overall level)
- "Fuzz" (tone)

== FY-2 Users ==
Notable musicians who have used the FY-2 include:

- Colin Greenwood of Radiohead, who used the pedal on "Exit Music (For a Film)" from the album OK Computer, and on "Myxomatosis" from Hail to the Thief.
- Graham Coxon
- Dan Auerbach
- Stephen Morris of Joy Division and New Order
- Ross Knight of Cosmic Psychos
- Nick Tyler of Driveblind
- Andrew Wilson of Die! Die! Die!
- Christian Bland of The Black Angels
- Ian Chestnutt of Percolator and Art Slug
- Kevin Bayly of The Dance Party
- William Reid of The Jesus and Mary Chain
