= Chase Bliss Audio =

American audio products company

Chase Bliss
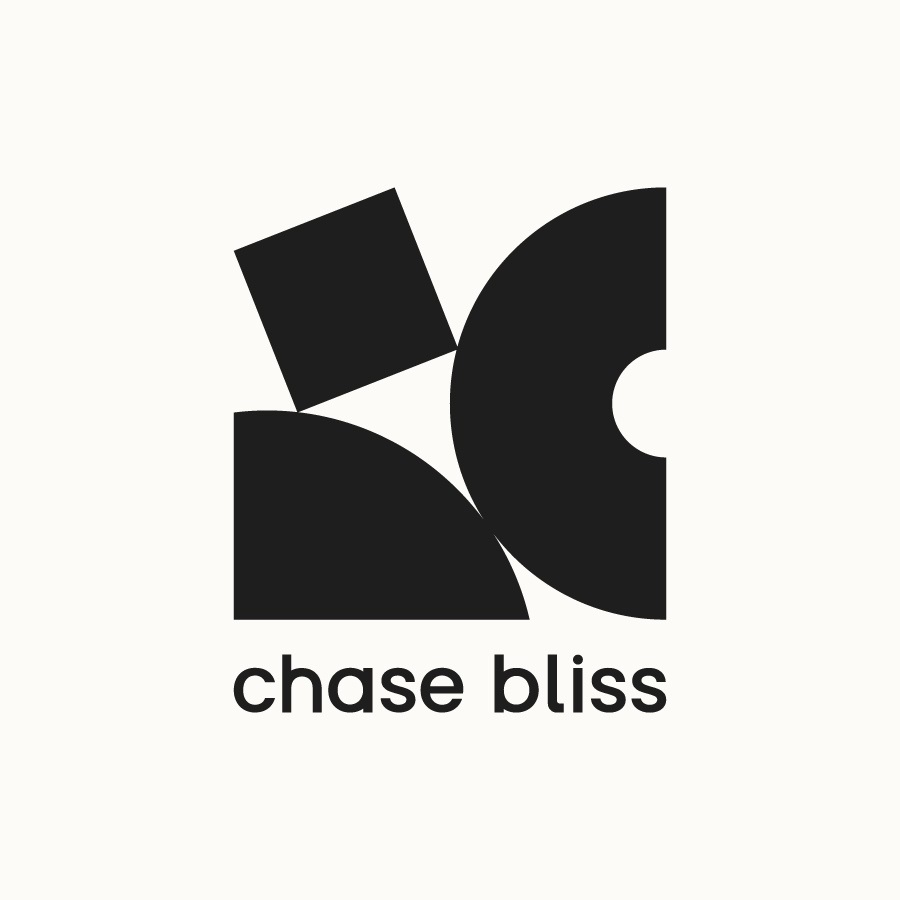
- Company type: Private
- Industry: Consumer electronics, professional audio
- Founded: 2013; 13 years ago
- Founder: Joel Korte
- Headquarters: Anoka, Minnesota, United States
- Products: Effects pedals
- Website: www.chasebliss.com

Chase Bliss is a Minnesota-based company that makes high-end electronic audio processors, known as effects pedals, used for the electric guitar, synthesizer, or for manipulating audio in a recording studio.

== History ==
Chase Bliss was founded in 2013 by Joel Korte in Anoka, Minnesota. The company is named after the founder's brother, Chase Korte, who died in 2007 after his car was struck by a drunk driver, and after a favourite quote of Chase's, "Follow Your Bliss" by Joseph Campbell.

== Pedals ==
Chase Bliss released the Warped Vinyl, its first pedal, at the end of 2013. The company's pedals contain multiple circuit boards and are manufactured in Minnesota and California. Premiere Guitar wrote of the pedals that they “are notable for their kitchen-sink approach—analog guts, digital brains, multiple knobs and toggles, and a bevy of DIP switches—with no parameter left untweakable.” Each has an analog signal path, controlled by digital microprocessors. Bands that have used the pedals include Nine Inch Nails, A-ha, Soul Asylum, and Radiohead.

In addition to the Warped Vinyl pedal and its predecessors, several other pedals have been produced by the company. In 2014 they released the Wombtone phaser pedal, in 2015 they released the Gravitas and the Spectre flanger pedal. In 2016 the company then released the Tonal Recall delay pedal. In 2017 the company released the Brothers pedal. Additionally, in 2018 they released the Thermae delay and harmonization pedal, and the Condor analog EQ pedal.

Notable later releases include the Dark World dual-channel digital reverb, the Mood micro-looper and ambience generator, the Blooper bottomless looper, and the Habit Echo Collector, which was the top-selling new pedal release in 2022 on Reverb.com. In 2020, the company introduced the Automatone series with the Preamp MKII, featuring motorized faders and deep preset integration, developed in collaboration with Benson Amps. Other recently launched pedals include the Lossy lo-fi bit crusher (in partnership with Goodhertz), the Clean stereo compressor, and the Brothers AM dual overdrive and distortion, a collaboration with Analog Man released in 2025.

=== Stompboxes ===
Most Chase Bliss units are in the familiar stompbox format, playing off of the tradition of effect pedals being in a rectangular chassis designed to be toggled by the musician's feet. Similar to guitar pedal giant BOSS, Chase Bliss tends to fit their different units into the same chassis, providing a format that is unique to their brand. This format consists of 6 knobs, 4 toggle switches, two foot-switchable buttons, an input, an output, CV/ expression pedal input, and MIDI input. Another feature unique to Chase Bliss are the DIP switches at the top of the stompbox. These are used to change, automate, or reverse the values of knobs.

In January 2019, at the 2019 NAMM Show, Chase Bliss revealed their plans on releasing the first of a new line of pedal format that they called the Automatone, called the Preamp mkii, a collaboration with Benson Amps.

== Notable Users ==
- Tycho: Dark World, Thermae, Condor, Warped Vinyl, Tonal Recall, Brothers, Gravitas, Wombtone
- Ed O'Brien (Radiohead): Tonal Recall RKM
- John Mayer: Tonal Recall, Warped Vinyl
- Kid Koala: Condor
- Tony Berg: Brothers, Tonal Recall, Warped Vinyl, Dark World, Thermae, Mood, Condor, Gravitas
