= King of Tone =

Guitar overdrive pedal

- Brand: Analog Man
- Dates: 2003–present

Technical specifications
- Effects type: Overdrive pedal

Controls
- Pedal control: Volume (x2), Tone (x2), Drive (x2); Treble (internal); Clean, OD, Distortion modes (internal DIP switches)

Input/output
- Inputs: Mono
- Outputs: Mono

The King of Tone is an overdrive pedal manufactured by boutique electric guitar effects pedal maker Mike Piera under the moniker Analog Man. Released in 2003, the King of Tone is a heavily-modified, dual-sided version of the then-discontinued Marshall Bluesbreaker pedal. The King of Tone is highly coveted among guitarists, with a years-long waiting list and prices on the used market greatly exceeding the cost of a new pedal. To help meet demand, Piera released a single-sided, lower-cost version, the Prince of Tone, as well as collaborated with the brand MXR on a mini-format, mass-produced version of the Prince of Tone, the Duke of Tone.

== History ==
=== Analog Man ===
In the 1980s, Mike Piera of Bethel, Connecticut was a software engineer in Japan, where he discovered a high demand for vintage American electric guitars. Because the U.S. vintage market was not yet established, Piera was able to create a successful side hustle importing such guitars and selling them on consignment to Japanese dealers. Acquiring these guitars, however, became difficult as availability dried up, so Piera—fascinated with audio electronics since childhood—turned to fixing and selling vintage effects pedals instead. He placed ads in Vintage Guitar magazine and offered pedals for sale at U.S. guitar shows under the name "Analog Man", a name he began using in 1993. Piera then turned to modding overdrive pedals like the Ibanez Tube Screamer, sourcing parts during trips to Tokyo and sharing his work on Usenet before the widespread use of the World Wide Web.

Piera's first handmade pedal was an Electro-Harmonix Small Clone style pedal, followed by his take on a Ross compressor. Piera's strategy of building modified versions of older effect pedals helped reestablish the popularity of several such circuits and set a trend that other small-scale, "boutique" builders would follow.

Tired of software engineering and unable to keep up with customer demand for his pedals as a part-time builder, Piera went full-time building pedals in 2000. He set up shop in his hometown of Bethel and created one of the internet's first websites to sell pedals—at a time when major companies like Fender and Gibson did not have websites. Many of the boutique brands that followed Piera's example went out of business within a few years or began manufacturing their pedals in factories once they achieved popularity. Piera, though, maintained his by-the-order business model, and his work has remained in-demand in large part thanks to the degree of customization he offers and his willingness to take on special orders.

=== King of Tone ===
A common theme of the Analog Man product line is that his pedals are based on classic effects long out of production. One such out-of-production pedal that came to Piera's attention was the Bluesbreaker overdrive, Marshall's attempt to recreate the tone of their famous Bluesbreaker amplifier in a pedal. While later regarded as a classic overdrive circuit, the Bluesbreaker pedal was considered at the time limited in its gain and tonal range and failed to sell well, with its discontinuation coming a few years after its introduction. Jim Weider of the Band acquired a modified Bluesbreaker pedal, which Piera played, and while Piera found it superior to the stock pedal, he still felt the circuit could be improved. Piera purchased his own Bluesbreaker pedal and ended up swapping out almost all of its components, resulting in a much different pedal. He was still dissatisfied with the Bluesbreaker's simplicity though and turned from modding it further to building his own version from the ground up.

The first King of Tone was released in 2003. This early version of Piera's pedal used a single overdrive circuit with the typical volume, drive, and tone controls, but expanded on the Bluesbreaker pedal's format with a second channel consisting of another volume control and footswitch. The King of Tone also used internal DIP switches for selecting between clean boost, overdrive, and distortion clipping modes. In 2005, Piera updated the King of Tone to use two independent overdrive circuits within a larger case, each with their own volume, tone, and drive controls, plus DIP switches. An internal treble trim pot was also added for more control of the high frequencies.

Of his pedal, Piera said, "It's not a heavy overdrive—it's less gain than a Tube Screamer, so it's not going to change your amp. If you like your guitar and want to keep your guitar tone, and if you like your amp and you want to keep your amp tone, that's what this is designed for." The King of Tone sold well upon release, with Piera initially building units himself by hand. His pedal developed a more significant following after Piera appeared on the YouTube channel "That Pedal Show" in 2017. Orders soon reached 200 per day—far more than Piera could keep up with—and the King of Tone developed a famously years-long waiting list, while prices on the used market far exceeded the cost of a new pedal. Guitar.com partly attributed this to Piera being so meticulous in his builds that he would rely on components even if they were already out of production and inevitably difficult to source. Piera has since released multiple versions of the King of Tone and offers additional features such as a higher-gain option, external toggle switches instead of the internal DIP switches, and custom colors.

In 2025, the waiting list for a new King of Tone stood at approximately four years, with 20 to 30 people adding their names to the list each day, while Piera and his team of around a dozen employees produce about 50 to 60 per week. Used versions of the pedal from the early 2000s can surpass $2,000, the highest secondhand prices for an overdrive pedal behind only the Klon Centaur. Piera has rejected theories that the waiting list is a marketing strategy designed to create hype around the King of Tone, stating that maintaining the list was an administrative hassle he had to hire another employee just to deal with. Piera has also rejected the notion of large price increases in response to public demand for his pedal, as Piera does not want to price the pedal out of the average player's reach. In 2019, the price of a standard King of Tone was $245. That price had risen to $335 by 2025 due to tariffs and the increasing costs of difficult-to-source parts.

=== Variants ===
Unable to meet demand and unwilling to cut corners to speed up manufacturing of the King of Tone, Piera developed a single-sided variation, the Prince of Tone, that would be manufactured in China. The Prince of Tone incorporated several revisions to the King of Tone design, such as increasing the gain and improving the distortion mode. However, Piera's preferred components remain scarce and the pedal is made in limited numbers that still sell out quickly.

In 2022, Piera partnered with MXR to release a mini-format, mass-produced version of the Prince of Tone, dubbed the Duke of Tone. The collaboration began when Jeorge Tripps, founder of Way Huge and MXR's chief designer, suggested pairing Piera's design with MXR's global manufacturing capacity. In response to the pedal's impending release, the "online guitar world lost their collective shit", according to Guitar.com. By the next year, the Duke of Tone was already MXR's bestselling pedal. Piera engaged in a second collaboration on a King of Tone-style pedal, this time in 2025 with Chase Bliss Audio on their Brothers AM overdrive, which combines analog and digital architecture to give the user extended control over the pedal's tone.

== Reception ==
The King of Tone is one of the most celebrated overdrive pedals ever made, with Vintage Guitar dubbing it one of a few "holy grail" overdrives and Guitar.com attributing it "near-mythical" status within the industry. The latter wrote:

...the KOT is adored for its dynamic and touch-sensitive responsive, alloyed with very tonally open gain and boost capabilities. At gig volume, the KOT shines with unparalleled clarity, integrating seamlessly with your rig. Offering more volume, more gain, and wider tonal flexibility than the Bluesbreaker, its more cultured midrange voice and delicate bass roll off demand more from a player but the rewards are sonic bliss—especially with the flexibility of two separate circuits.

In exploring the history of the Bluesbreaker pedal, JHS Pedals founder Josh Scott wrote that any claims of the King of Tone being a Bluesbreaker "clone" are incorrect: he noted that while the King of Tone's topology is based on that of the Bluesbreaker, the end result of Piera's changes is a "very, very different" pedal; he went on to say that the King of Tone inspired many boutique builders like himself to follow suit with their own Bluesbreaker-style offerings. In 2025, Guitar World included the King of Tone in its list of the 50 greatest pieces of guitar gear of the century so far.

Notable fans of the King of Tone include Ed O'Brien, Brad Whitford, Tom Bukovac, and Noel Gallagher.

== See also ==
- List of distortion pedals
