= Pro Co RAT =

Guitar distortion pedal

ProCo RAT
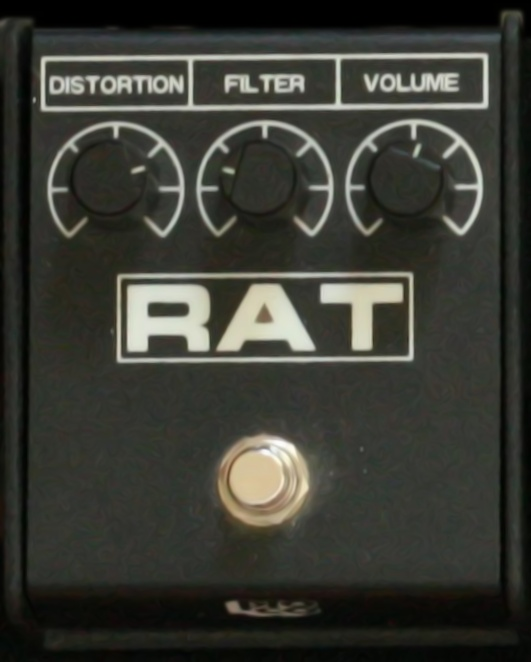
- Brand: ProCo
- Dates: 1978—present

Technical specifications
- Effects type: Distortion pedal

Controls
- Pedal control: Distortion, Filter, Volume

Input/output
- Inputs: Mono
- Outputs: Mono

The ProCo RAT is a distortion pedal produced by ProCo Sound for use with electric guitar. The RAT has become one of the industry's most popular effects pedals due to its tone and versatility, producing an aggressive style of distortion that can cross over into overdrive or fuzz depending on the pedal's settings. Prototypes were designed by ProCo engineer Scott Burnham in the company's rat-infested basement in Kalamazoo, Michigan, with early units made to order for customers and full production starting in 1979. The current production model, the RAT2, was released in 1988 and multiple variations of the circuit have since been released by ProCo, such as the TurboRAT and You Dirty RAT. Many other pedal companies produce clones of or homages to the RAT circuit. Guitar World credited the RAT with creating "the template for what distortion sounds like to this day."

== History ==
=== Development ===
ProCo engineer Scott Burnham began designing what became the RAT circuit in the mid-1970s, possibly as early as 1974, with the assistance of fellow engineer Steve Kiraly. This was around the same time "hard-clipping" distortion pedals like the MXR Distortion+ were hitting the market. While experimenting with his design, Burnham accidentally used a 47 ohm resistor instead of a 470 ohm resister value to bias the op-amp, resulting in much higher levels of gain. Combined with a diode clipping section, this allowed for more aggressive distortion than was available at the time. Author Pagan Kennedy describes Burnham's accidental invention:

"One day, as he was soldering parts, he picked up a resistor of the wrong size—this was his lucky mistake—and attached it to a circuit board. The machine began shrieking and moaning. And that's how he heard a new sound; it was beautiful, haunting, ugly, and full of soul. He immediately recognized this as a major discovery, and he built that sound into a distortion pedal he named the Rat. Attached to a guitar, the Rat turned every note into a blast of outrage."

The earliest physical prototypes of the RAT—named for the rodent-infested basement of the ProCo facility in Kalamazoo, Michigan it was designed in—were made in 1977 or 1978. These dozen or so units used premade Bud Box enclosures, which led to them being known as "Bud Box RATs," and they were made-to-order for customers. ProCo owner Charlie Wicks liked the RAT enough to make it a full production model and it first appeared in 1979's ProCo product catalog.

=== Original versions ===
==== The RAT ====
ProCo's first production model RAT used a large, wrap-around metal enclosure painted black with white, silk-screened text and logos. The earliest of these so-called "Big Box" RATs went through multiple cosmetic changes in 1979: the logos changed slightly and different knobs were used. In 1981, ProCo made its first design change to the RAT, albeit a small one. ProCo reversed the contact points on the PCB connecting to the tone control's potentiometer to reverse the direction of its sweep so that the pedal's tone became darker as the control was turned clockwise. The "Tone" control label was also changed to "Filter."

Living Colour's Vernon Reid, a "Big Box" RAT user, said of the music scene's reaction to the RAT, "People were freaking out. Hard-rock dudes, metal dudes, funk dudes—everybody. It was insane." Reid described the RAT as producing "amplifier-like overdrive but even more extreme" and noted that it could make a clean Fender amp sound like a Marshall or Mesa/Boogie.

By the early 1980s, ProCo was seeing RAT sales drop as competitors like Boss, MXR, and DOD offered pedals in smaller, pedalboard-friendly enclosures. ProCo sought to keep up by releasing a compact version of the RAT in 1984. Cosmetically, the new RAT used a block logo that was white with black text inside it and it became known as the "White Face" RAT. The new logo was difficult to produce however and ProCo opted to change the design in 1986 so that the white block was reduced to a thin border around white "RAT" text in an otherwise black logo. Consequently, this update became known as the "Black Face" RAT.

==== RAT2 ====
In 1988, the RAT2 was introduced to replace the original RAT model. The RAT2 included an LED on/off status light and the screen-printed labels were replaced with glow-in-the-dark mylar. The RAT2 remained popular enough among players that ProCo was struggling to keep up with demand by the early 2000s. To ease his factory's workload, Wicks struck a deal with parts supplier Neutrik to produce the RAT2 in Neutrik's Chinese factory. These overseas-made RAT2s came to market in 2008 with sloped enclosures (introduced with the TurboRAT) and using the OD07DP op-amp, which ProCo had replaced the original LM308 with by 1996 since the LM308 had been declared obsolete by Texas Instruments.

In 2011, ProCo released the Lil' RAT, which was the RAT2 circuit in a 2"-wide enclosure that omitted battery usage.

=== Variations ===
==== Juggernaut ====
In 1979, ProCo also introduced a version of the RAT intended for bass players, the Juggernaut. It featured an effects loop, a master volume, and a mix control, which allowed users to blend the unaffected signal into the distorted signal to restore any low end loss that occurs because of the effect's clipping. Despite the Juggernaut's large enclosure, there was no battery compartment. The Juggernaut was made until 1983 as a custom-order product. The brand reissued it in 2003.

==== TurboRAT ====
ProCo released its first major change to the RAT topology in 1989 with the TurboRAT. The brand was facing new competition from the early "boutique" effect pedal makers and needed a new product. Employee Gerry Carpenter (known as "Grape") disliked the tone of the RAT when used with an already-overdriven Marshall amplifier and decided to alter how the pedal clipped. He removed the silicon diodes and replaced them with 5mm red status indicator LEDs that ProCo already stocked. The effect was drastic, allowing the pedal to act more effectively as a boost with the gain low and level high. Its tone was also less compressed. As with the RAT2, the TurboRAT's LM308 op-amp was changed to the OD07DP in 1996.

==== Roadkill and BRAT ====
In 1996, Wicks was contacted by Guitar Center, who wanted an inexpensive and exclusive RAT model to sell through their Musician's Friend catalog. Carpenter's design, the Roadkill, represented a significant departure from the stock RAT, with changes like the use of an input buffer and soft-clipping inside the op amp's feedback loop (like an Ibanez Tube Screamer) in addition to the RAT's otherwise hard-clipping circuit. Demand, however, failed to meet expectations and—not wanting to waste the excess parts that had been intended for the Roadkill—ProCo released the BRAT as a pink-colored version of the Roadkill for the larger market.

==== Deucetone and You Dirty RAT ====
ProCo went with a larger, more complex pedal for its next release. The Deucetone RAT of 2002 was effectively a pedal version of the company's short-lived, dual-circuit rackmount RAT made in the 1980s, known as the R2DU (RAT2 Dual Unit). Wicks wanted to reissue this "Rack RAT" but ProCo employees argued against this in favor of a pedal version instead. This pedal, the Deucetone, used two stackable RAT circuits (Channels A and B), each with three clipping modes. Both channels had LED and silicon diode modes; channel A's third mode was Dirty RAT and channel B's third mode was Clean.

In 2004, the Deucetone's Dirty RAT clipping mode was released as a standalone pedal, the You Dirty RAT. ProCo however switched to germanium diodes for the new pedal, which created a more saturated and compressed version of the RAT sound.

==== FATRAT ====
Throughout its history, the RAT has been a popular pedal for modifications. With the FATRAT, first offered in 2014, ProCo implemented several common mods into the circuit, including an option to extend the pedal's bass frequencies (via a "Fat" switch) and selectable clipping options that offered a new MOSFET arrangement. The prototype was designed by Bill Eaton, Chris Frankhauser, and Bill Hanepel, and was initially called the RAT Bastard.

== Legacy ==
=== Reissues ===
In 1991, ProCo released its first reissue, the "Big Box"-style Vintage Reissue RAT, to capitalize on players' nostalgia for older products inspired by the newfound popularity of the vintage gear market. The reissue was a great success but furthered the incorrect belief that older RAT models were in some way superior in tone to new versions despite having the same circuit used in the RAT since 1981. ProCo reissued the bass-centric Juggernaut in 2003 and released the White Face Reissue RAT in 2010.

=== Clones ===
As an iconic distortion pedal, versions of the RAT have been made by many companies as both budget offerings—despite the RAT already being affordable—and more expensive boutique models. RAT-style pedals for the budget market include the Mooer Black Secret and TC Electronic Magus Pro. Boutique models include the JHS Packrat, Wampler Ratsbane, 1981 Inventions DRV, and Earthquaker Devices Life Pedal.

== Circuitry ==
On the most basic level, all distortion pedals function by first amplifying the incoming signal then limiting it in some way to produce distortion. In this case, the RAT uses an op-amp to amplify the signal and diodes connected to ground to do the limiting. The degree to which the op-amp amplifies the signal is controlled by the pedal's Distortion control. Unlike most other distortion pedals, the RAT's op-amp chip—initially, the LM308—does not cleanly boost the signal without distortion: instead, at higher distortion settings the gain surpasses what the chip can handle, causing it to distort on its own. The signal then passes through two 1N4148 silicon diodes to produce the bulk of the RAT's distortion. Because the diodes conduct any signal above a certain threshold to ground as its method of clipping (known as "hard-clipping") the waveform is more sharply affected and the resulting sound more aggressive. Most RAT variants alter their sound by switching out these diodes. For example, the You Dirty RAT uses germanium diodes and the TurboRAT uses red LEDs; many modern RAT clones offer multiple clipping options.

Unlike other early hard-clipping distortion pedals, such as the MXR Distortion +, the RAT included a tone control, labeled Filter, which was placed after the clipping stage. Functionally, it is a low-pass filter with a cutoff frequency of around 500Hz. The Filter control's sweep works in reverse compared to other distortion pedals: it produces a very dark tone when set fully clockwise; counter-clockwise, the unaffected signal passes through for a brighter sound.

=== Tone ===
Players commonly question whether the RAT qualifies as an overdrive, distortion, or fuzz pedal. While the terms are largely subjective, the consensus, according to Guitar.com, is that the RAT is a distortion pedal that can nonetheless achieve lower-gain, overdrive-style tones with the distortion control set low and fuzz-style tones with the control at its highest. The RAT's low-gain tones are less-commonly prized but have been used by guitarists like John Scofield. The "hard, aggressive" distortion the RAT is known for occurs as the distortion control is increased. Once it is set past two-thirds, the distortion takes on a "fat, heavily broken" and "grungy" quality. At its highest-gain, the RAT's fuzz-like sound is thick and smooth. Unlike many pedals capable of high levels of distortion, the RAT does not produce an unappealing "high-end-fizz," which is the result of the op-amp's slower slew rate preventing the circuit from amplifying higher frequencies as much. The RAT also cuts bass frequencies, leaving a more midrange-dominant sound that helps the player's guitar stand out in the mix.

Guitar.com concluded an analysis of the pedal by noting that what sounds the RAT can achieve heavily depends on the player's amplifier and the amp's settings. The piece credited the RAT as excelling in a wide variety of applications thanks to the wide sweep of its controls.

== Notable users ==
- Ichirou Agata of Melt-Banana
- Jeff Beck
- Nuno Bettencourt
- Frank Black
- Nels Cline of Wilco
- Lawrence Chandler
- Kurt Cobain
- Graham Coxon
- Kevin Eubanks
- Bill Frisell
- David Gilmour
- Dave Grohl
- James Hetfield
- Krist Novoselic
- Joe Perry
- Ben Monder
- Vernon Reid of Living Colour
- Kurt Rosenwinkel
- John Scofield
- Sonny Sharrock
- Andy Summers
- Alex Turner
- Thom Yorke
- Xan McCurdy of Cake
- Boris
- Rivers Cuomo
- Neil Halstead
- Mark Gardener

== Gallery ==
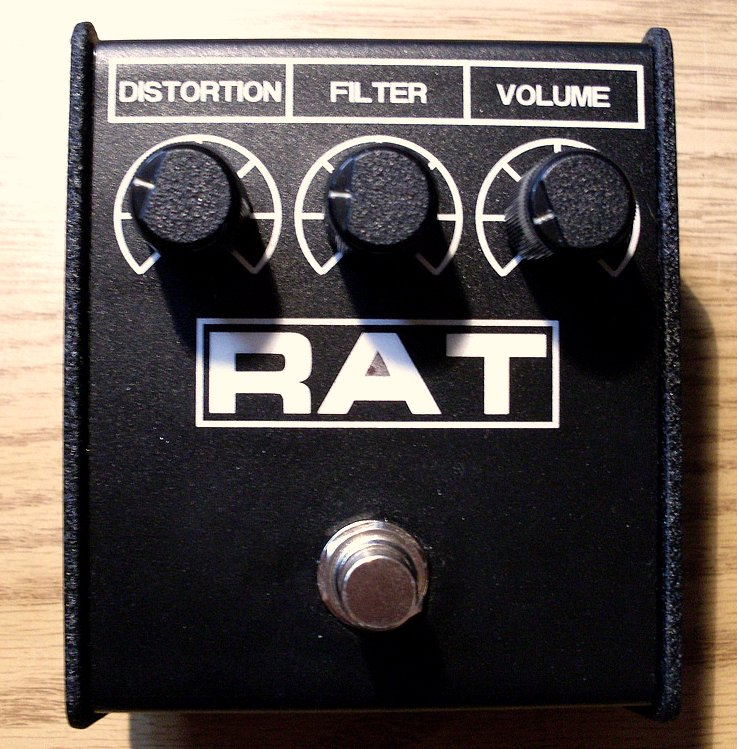
ProCo Rat 2

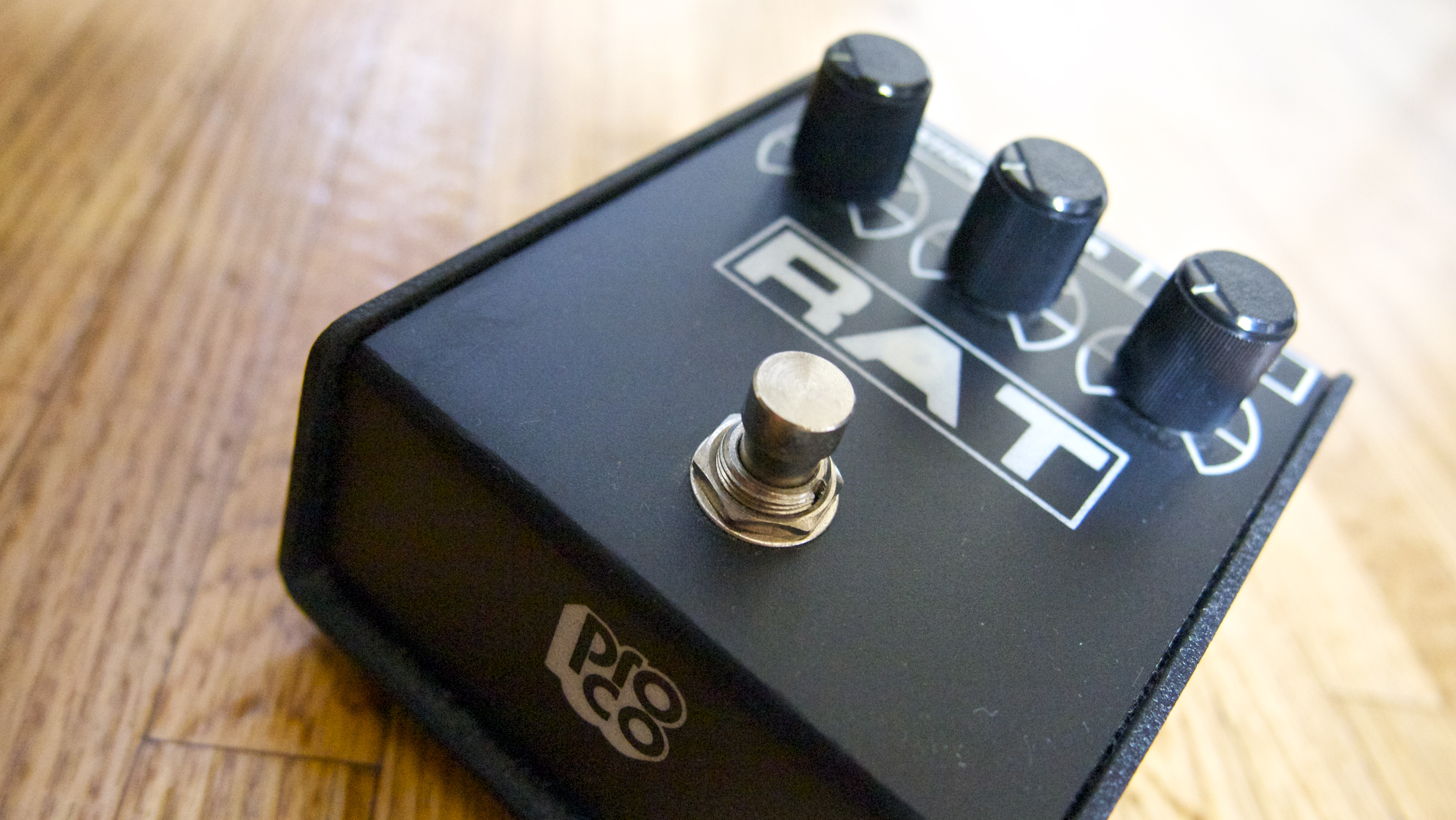
Rat 2

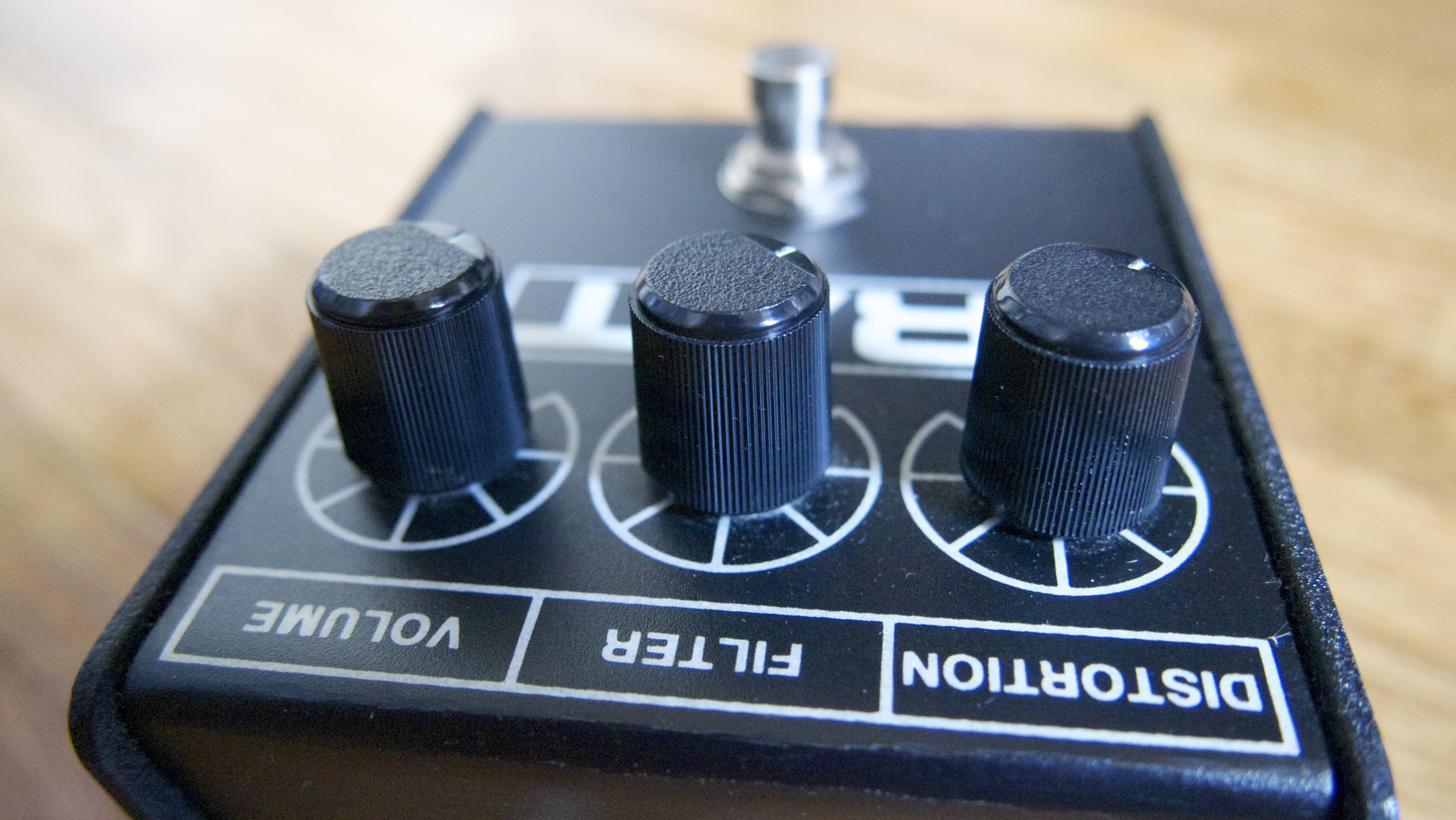
Rat 2 controls

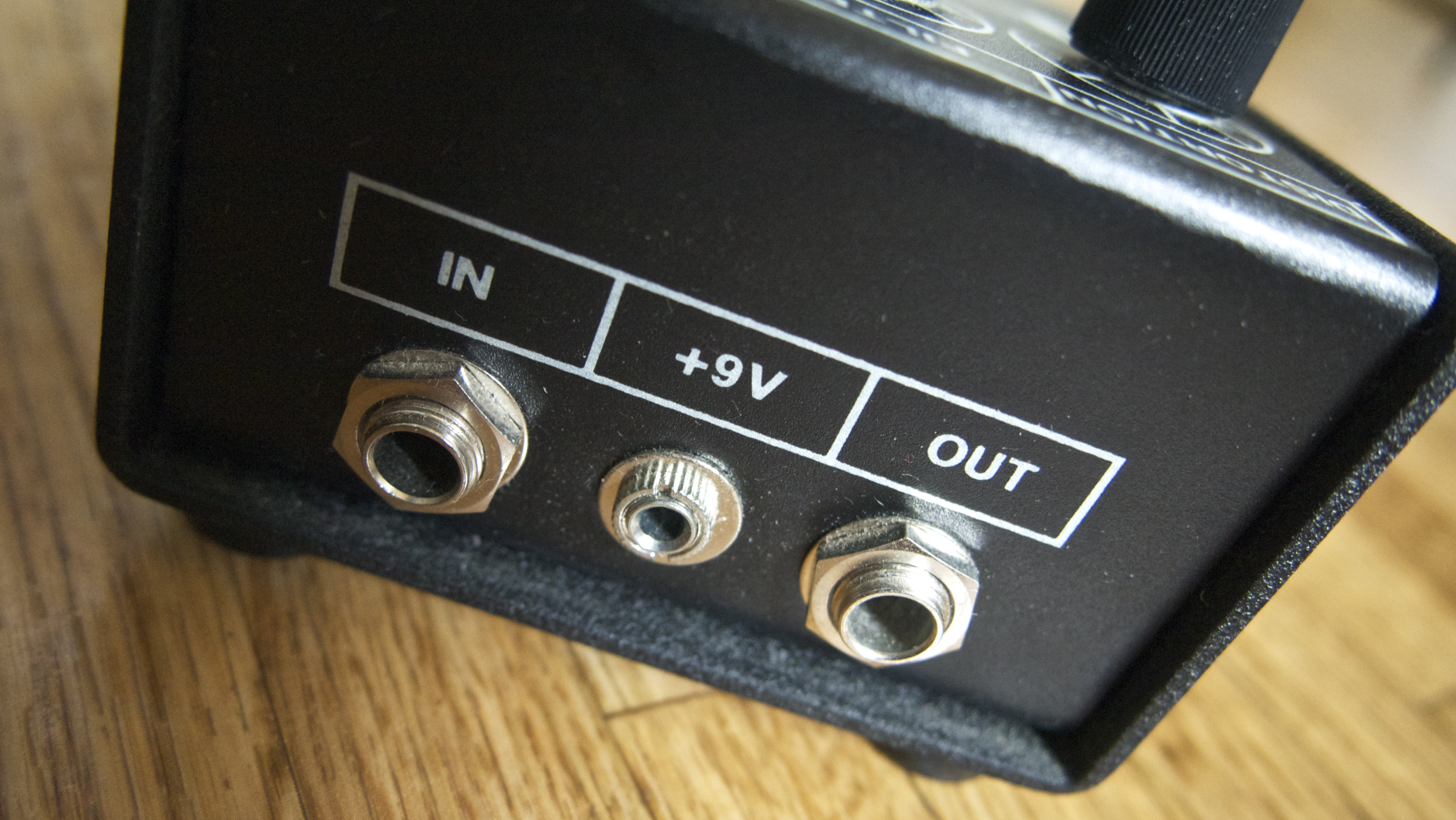
Rat 2 top

== See also ==
- List of distortion pedals
