= Klon Centaur =

Guitar overdrive pedal

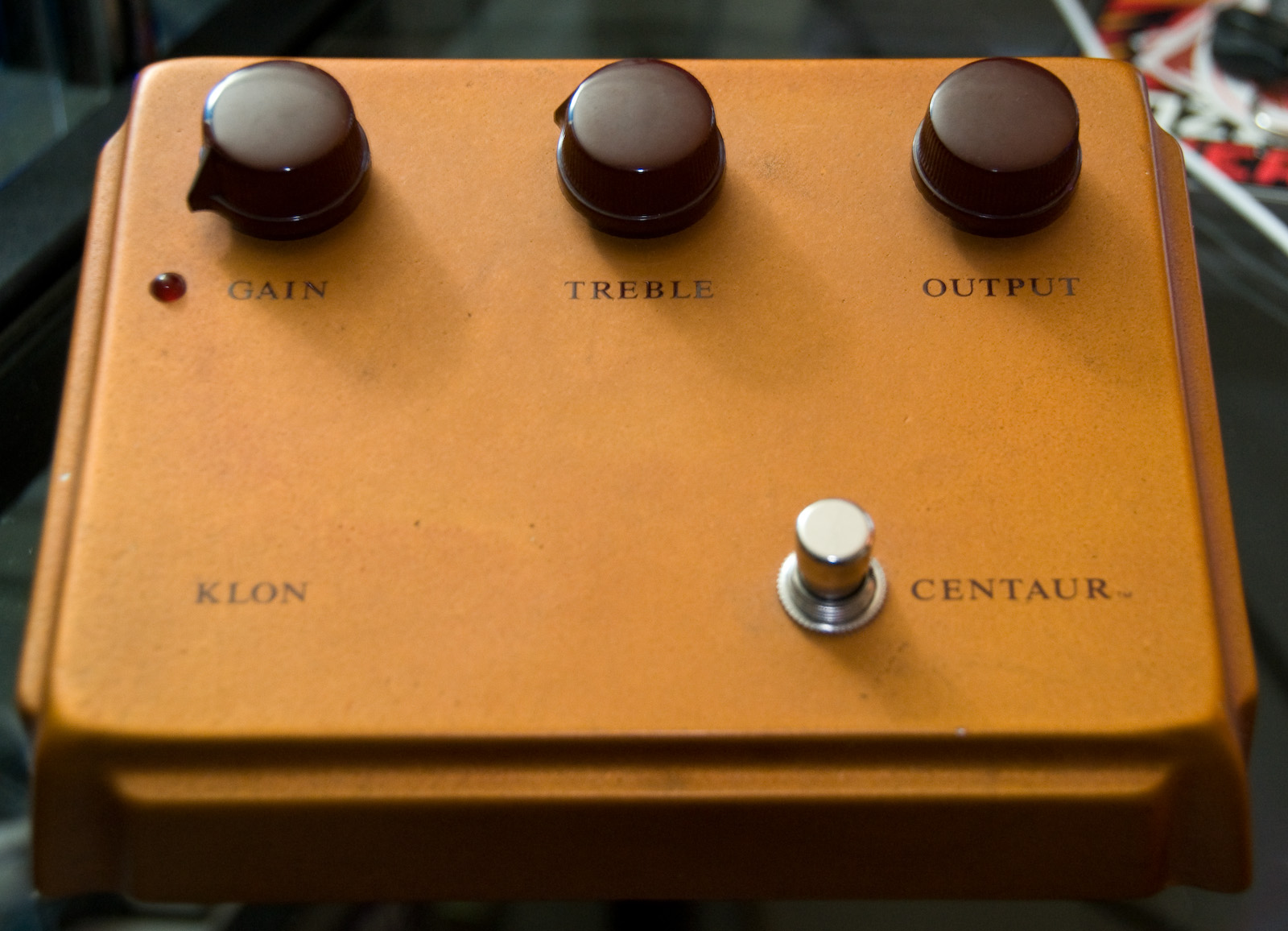
- An original Klon Centaur
- Brand: Klon
- Dates: 1994−2008 (original production); 2014−present (Klon KTR)

Technical specifications
- Effects type: Overdrive pedal

Controls
- Pedal control: Gain, Treble, Output

Input/output
- Inputs: Mono
- Outputs: Mono

The Klon Centaur (commonly known as the Klon) is an overdrive pedal made by Bill Finnegan between 1994 and 2008. With the Centaur, Finnegan sought to emulate the distortion of a guitar amplifier being played at a high volume. Finnegan's pedal was popular but he struggled to meet demand and his profit margin remained low while used units sold for high prices. Finnegan discontinued his pedal in 2008, having produced around 8,000 in total. In 2014, Finnegan debuted the redesigned Klon KTR, which was outsourced to contracted firms for production.

The Centaur has been credited with popularizing "transparent" overdrives, a type of overdrive intended to increase gain with minimal effect on the underlying tone. Guitar World however described the Centaur as emphasizing certain midrange frequencies and adding thickness to the tone. Numerous manufacturers have created Klon-style pedals, or "klones". As of 2024, used Klon Centaurs have sold for up to $20,000 USD.

== Design ==
With the Klon Centaur, Bill Finnegan of Boston, Massachusetts, sought to offer players a pedal that would add gain to the signal with minimal coloring of the underlying tone. It was intended to be used in conjunction with an amplifier's own overdrive to add sustain and volume, as opposed to being used as the sole source of distortion with a clean amplifier. The Centaur did however add to the signal a slight increase in midrange frequencies and its own distortion character.

To achieve his goal, Finnegan and his collaborators used several unique features in a relatively complex circuit. Following an internal voltage converter to double the voltage from nine to eighteen, the signal is split into three paths. The first path generates the pedal's distortion by sending the signal through a TL072 op amp and two 1N34A diodes. These diodes are new old stock and use hard rather than soft clipping. The TL072 op amp is JFET-based. Most of the Centaur's distortion comes from the op amp, with the TL072 being a common, inexpensive part; the character of the pedal's germanium diodes only becomes apparent at the highest gain settings, with germanium diodes altering the tone by adding a slightly softer and "spongier" sound compared to other components.

The circuit's second path sends unaffected low frequencies to the pedal's output. The third path is another unaffected signal that works in tandem with the gain control: as the gain control is turned clockwise, the gain increases while the unaffected signal decreases. Because U.S. law does not allow electronic circuits to be patented, Finnegan coated the components of his pedal in epoxy resin to make the circuit harder to identify and replicate.

Original Centaurs came in a custom-cast enclosure with a bronze-and-oxblood color scheme and were decorated with a sword-wielding centaur icon known as "the horsie".

== History ==
=== Development ===
In the late 1980s, Finnegan sought an overdrive pedal that would emulate the distortion of a guitar amplifier being played at high volume as if a pedal was not being used. At smaller venues that limited stage volume, Finnegan had been dissatisfied with the sounds he could achieve with his Fender Telecaster through a Twin Reverb. Finnegan experimented with pedals like the Ibanez Tube Screamer, but disliked how they altered his underlying tone. With electrical engineer friends, including MIT graduate Fred Fenning, Finnegan began developing prototype pedals in his spare time, a process that would take over four and a half years. Finnegan later gave Fenning—who died in a plane crash in the mid-1990s—much of the credit for the Centaur's design.

=== Original production run ===
Finnegan began selling the Klon Centaur in late 1994. He worked long hours in his home, building, testing, and shipping the pedals himself. Every part was custom-made, including the enclosure, knobs, and pots. The Centaur was popular but the build time was long. It took Finnegan 12 to 14 weeks to fulfil each order. Used Centaurs began selling for increasingly high prices, which placed more pressure on Finnegan to meet demand. Finnegan later admitted his profit margin was "not very sensible" and he found it difficult to hire employees and expand the business in Boston, where commercial space was expensive.

In 2008, Finnegan decided the situation was unsustainable and discontinued the Centaur, having built around 8,000 units over 15 years. He later recalled his decision to cancel his only product: "I was going to have to kill it before it could kill me." Finnegan occasionally produces single units for sale, including one for auction on eBay on behalf of a single mother he knew who needed financial support.

=== Klon KTR ===
Beginning in 2008, Finnegan began designing a new version of the Centaur for mass production, the Klon KTR. The process was slow, with his goal being to create a more straightforward design that could be built by a contracted manufacturing firm and would be easy to repair, among other considerations, while preserving the Centaur sound. The only new feature the KTR included was a buffered or true bypass switch, which was designed for Finnegan by his friend and fellow boutique pedal maker Paul Cochrane, inventor of the Timmy overdrive. The Klon KTR, released in 2014, sold for $269. It bears the text: "Kindly remember: The ridiculous hype that offends so many is not of my making."

== Legacy ==
With the release of the Centaur, Finnegan established himself as one of the best-known independent, or "boutique", pedal builders that emerged in the 1990s, alongside others like Fulltone, Z.Vex, Way Huge, and Analog Man.

The Klon Centaur has been used by guitarists including Jeff Beck, John Mayer, Joe Perry (of Aerosmith), Nels Cline (of Wilco), Matt Schofield and Ed O'Brien (of Radiohead). Finnegan said the pedal attracted a variety of guitarists, including baby boomers, younger indie rock musicians and experimental musicians. Guitar World praised the clear, uncolored tone of the boosted signal.

In 2019, used Centaurs sold for between $1,900 and $2,500 USD. By 2021, the average price had risen to around $4,000. Prices reached $20,000 USD by 2024. According to Guitar.com, which named the Centaur one of the greatest effect pedals, "The Klon Centaur is either the greatest, most useful overdrive ever made, or the worst example of guitarists losing all sense of perspective about how much good tone should cost."

In 2021, Josh Scott of JHS Pedals mocked the Centaur's escalating value by listing his Centaur—the first ever sold—on the online marketplace Reverb.com for $500,000 and promising to hand-deliver it free "anywhere on Earth". In early 2023, Scott published a YouTube video comparing the Centaur against the DigiTech Bad Monkey Tube Overdrive, a discontinued pedal released in 2004. The video demonstrated no discernible difference in sound. Online listings for Bad Monkey pedals rose as high as $11,000, up from an average of $50 in January 2023. Responding to complaints that he had driven the price up, Scott wrote in a statement: "I would like to remind you you had 19 years to buy one, but you never cared ... Learn to listen with your ears and not trends, and you will be a much happier guitarist."

=== Clones ===
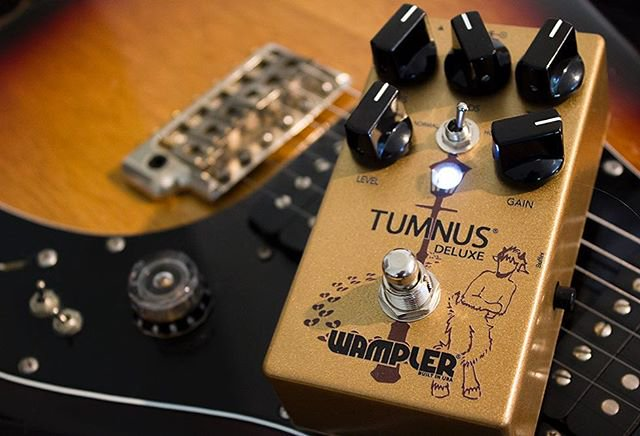
The Wampler Tumnus Deluxe, a pedal based on the Klon Centaur

Finnegan's attempt to obscure the Centaur's circuit with epoxy proved ineffective, and with used prices for his pedal high and constantly increasing, many manufacturers created lower-cost Klon clones, or "klones", to take advantage. Finnegan has expressed skepticism that imitators can replicate the Centaur sound due to factors including the rarity of its germanium diodes. He further argued klones damage his product's reputation and disincentivize engineers from creating innovative products.

Klones often use a similar color scheme to the Centaur or have their own centaur icon, but use cheaper manufacturing methods. Popular klones include the Wampler Tumnus, Way Huge Conspiracy Theory, and Electro-Harmonix Soul Food. In a comparison between an original Centaur and several imitators, Premier Guitar observed that the klones achieve close approximations of the Centaur tone even when using different components, like silicon diodes over germanium. Premier Guitar concluded that the Klon's character comes from its circuit topology rather than its components.

In July 2024, Finnegan warned that fake Klon pedals were in circulation. In June 2025, he sued Behringer for "trademark and trade dress infringement, false advertising, and false designation of origin" over the brand's Centaur Overdrive, an "exacting take" on the Klon's styling that used Finnegan's name and imagery of an actual Klon Centaur in promotional materials. The case was dismissed after Behringer changed the name of their pedal to the Zentara and made several visual alterations.

== See also ==
- King of Tone
- List of distortion pedals
