= Wampler =

Wampler is a surname. Notable people with the surname include:

- Fred Wampler (Congressman) (1909–1999), U.S. Representative from Indiana
- Fred Wampler (golfer) (1923–1985), American professional golfer who played on the PGA Tour and the Senior PGA Tour
- William C. Wampler (1926–2012), United States Representative from Virginia
- William C. Wampler, Jr. (born 1959), American politician, elected to the Senate of Virginia in 1988
- William C. "Will" Wampler III (born 1991), member of the Virginia House of Delegates
- Wampler Pedals, manufacturer of guitar effects pedals
