= JHS Pedals =

Guitar effects pedals manufacturer

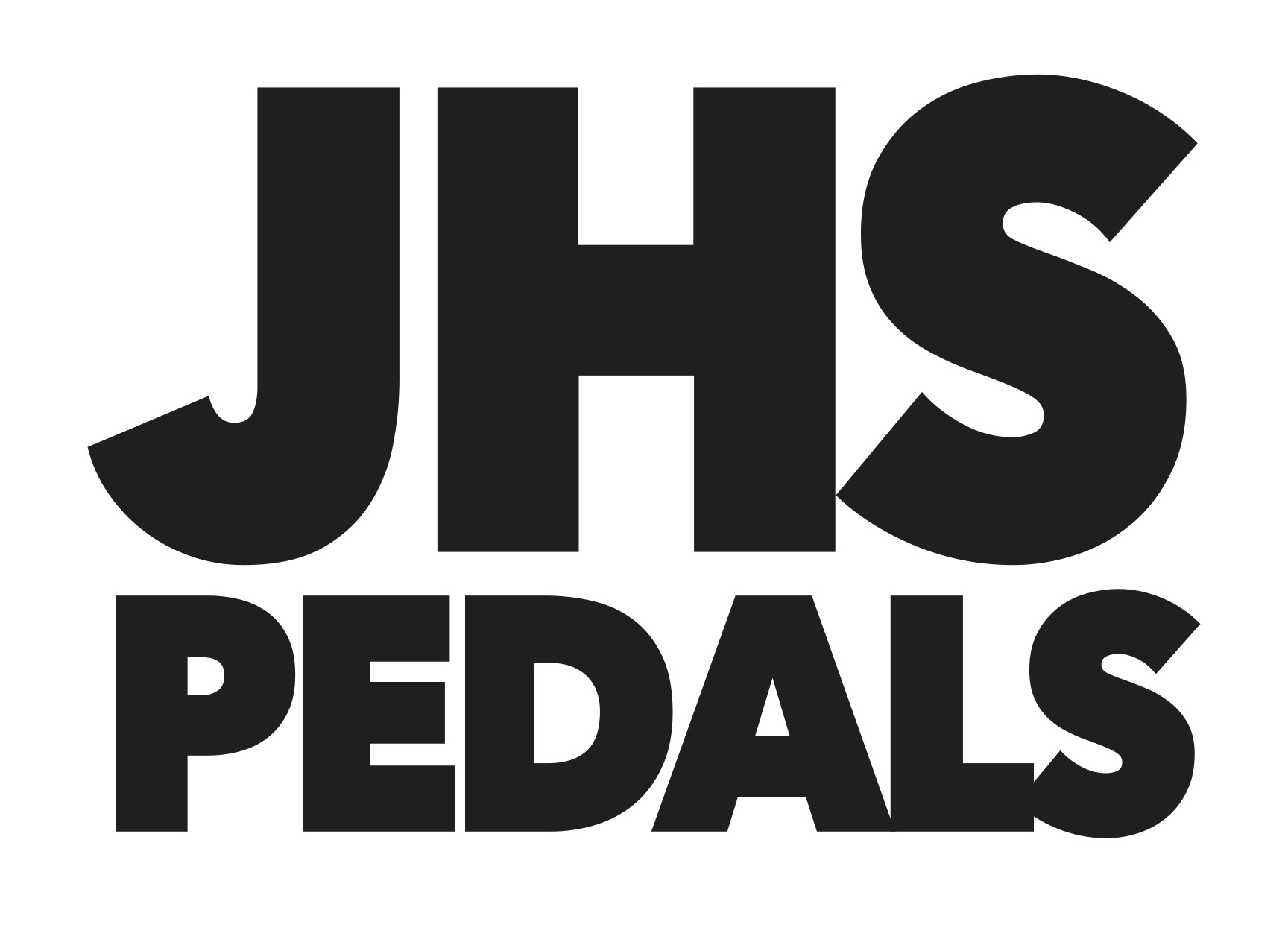
- Type: Limited Liability Company
- Industry: Guitar effects pedals
- Founded: 2007
- Founder: Joshua Heath Scott
- Headquarters: Kansas City, Missouri, United States
- Products: Effects units
- Number of employees: 35 (April 2021)
- Website: www.jhspedals.com

JHS Pedals is an American manufacturer of effects pedals for electric guitar and bass located in Kansas City, Missouri. Josh Heath Scott founded his namesake company in 2007 after building a reputation modding effects pedals. Original JHS designs include the popular Morning Glory, Colour Box, and Angry Charlie, which established the company as a prominent brand in the boutique market. JHS has collaborated with many artists and companies, such as Boss and Electro-Harmonix.

== History ==
=== Josh Scott ===
Josh Scott grew up in Belgreen, Alabama, a small farming community in the northwest part of the state that Scott would later say offered little for a teenager like him to do. Standing 6'6" tall, Scott became a fan of the Boston Celtics and dreamed of playing basketball like Larry Bird. This changed after Scott heard some of his older brother's cassette collection. He was fascinated in particular by Mike McCready's tone on the solo for Pearl Jam's "Alive" and asked his mother for a guitar. They purchased a cheap Stratocaster copy from Sam's Club and by his high school years Scott was proficient enough on the instrument to join an established band that toured the region. This in turn led to studio session work and a growing interest in audio electronics. After fixing a Boss Blues Driver, Scott noticed this stock pedal sounded different than a Keeley-modded one, so he disassembled them both to identify the changes. Scott kept experimenting with pedals, learning how things worked by ear rather than through any electronics training.

After moving to Jackson, Mississippi, Scott began purchasing Boss pedals from Guitar Center, modding them, and selling them in local shops and on eBay. By 2007, he was married with a child on the way. Compared to studio work and gigging, his modest pedal modification side business began to look like a steadier way of making a living—to Scott's own surprise. His pedals "just kept selling and selling," he later said. Scott began developing original models in 2008, building them from scratch and stamping them with a "JHS" logo. To reflect his expanding business, Scott changed the initial name of his company, "JHS Mods", to "JHS Pedals" in the middle of the year.

=== JHS Pedals ===
Scott began manufacturing effects pedals full-time after the birth of his daughter. He worked in a woodshed on his property for 16 to 18 hours a day yet still fell behind on orders. In 2009, Scott moved his family to Kansas City, Missouri, where he continued his business, now working in his basement alongside his first employee, Nick Loux. For the first few years, Scott struggled, having no skillset for running a business, by his own admission. Despite this, JHS became popular in the high-end, "boutique" effects pedal market with the success of pedals like the Marshall Bluesbreaker-style Morning Glory overdrive and the Pulp 'N' Peel compressor, both of which were among his earliest designs. JHS soon moved into their own building and hired more employees, effectively outgrowing the "boutique" label. Scott delegated much of the day-to-day construction and administrative tasks to his team and focused instead on new designs, like the Panther analog delay, released in 2011, and the SuperBolt overdrive and Prestige booster/buffer/enhancer, both released in 2012. By 2013, JHS had ten employees and produced around 15,000 products that year, including original designs, custom shop orders, and mods. In 2018, Scott and Loux released the first episode of The JHS Show, a video blog about guitar pedal history, products, and inventors. Scott's screen persona has been described as "the Bill Nye the Science Guy meets Mister Rogers of guitar".

In early 2023, Scott published a YouTube video comparing a Klon Centaur to the discontinued DigiTech Bad Monkey Tube Overdrive and demonstrated no discernible difference in sound. Used Reverb.com listings for Bad Monkey pedals rose as high as $11,000 as a result, up from an average of $50 in January 2023. Responding to complaints that he had driven the price up, Scott wrote in a statement: "I would like to remind you you had 19 years to buy one, but you never cared ... Learn to listen with your ears and not trends, and you will be a much happier guitarist." Scott later suffered a serious mountain biking accident, leaving him unable to create the customary video introduction and demo for the brand's then-most-recent pedal, the 424 Gain Stage. John Mayer surprised Scott by providing his own video demo instead.

== Products ==
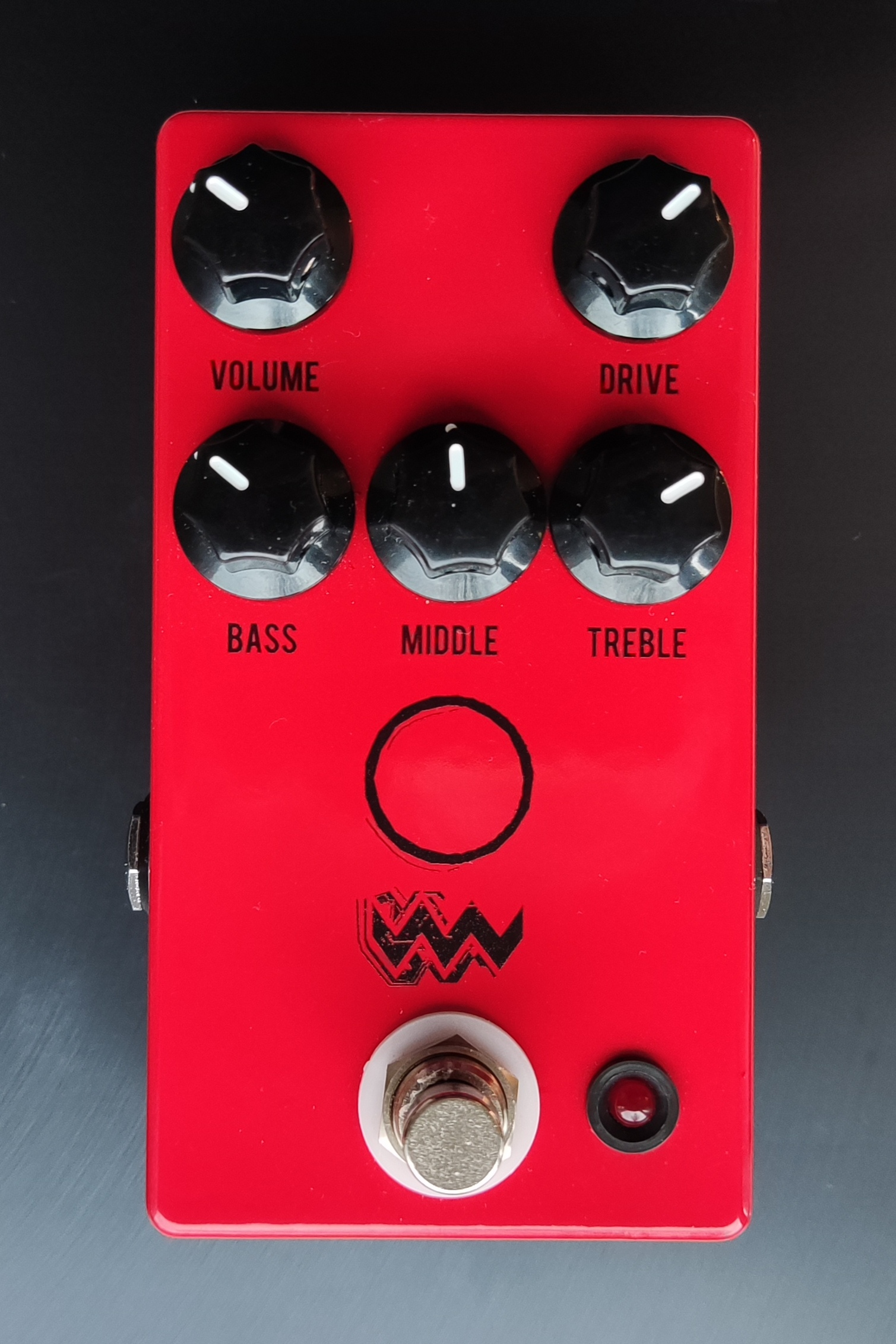
JHS Angry Charly overdrive/distortion pedal

Most of JHS's pedals are inspired by what Scott himself wants to play but could never find. Among his first offerings were the Morning Glory and Pulp 'N' Peel, as well as the All American, a Pro Co RAT-style pedal. Scott dubbed the Colour Box, released in 2012, his "Everest": a DI stompbox that combined a preamp, EQ, fuzz, overdrive, and distortion. The Colour Box spent several years as the brand's best-selling pedal despite its $400 price tag. Some of Scott's pedals are overdrives that emulate the sound of famous amplifiers, including the SuperBolt (late 1960s Supro), Charlie Brown (Marshall JTM45), and Angry Charlie (Marshall JCM800). Other creations include pedals that offer selectable iterations of a single, iconic pedal: the Bonsai (Ibanez Tube Screamer), PackRat (Pro Co RAT), and Muffuletta (Big Muff).

JHS offers lower-cost, US-built pedals as its "3 Series" line, first released in 2020 and all using the same three-control format and plain white case. In 2024, JHS released the Klon Centaur-voiced Notaklön overdrive, a solderless, IKEA-inspired pedal that the buyer partly assembles themselves. While Klon clones are common, the "foolproof" DIY nature of the pedal proved widely popular, with Guitar World including it in its list of the 50 best pieces of gear of the last 25 years. JHS followed a similar format the next year with the Notadümblë, a Dumble-voiced DIY amp-in-a-box overdrive that looked poised for similar success, but it was discontinued after only two weeks due to a mix-up in the circuit design. JHS released a corrected version, the Notadümblë V2, in 2026. JHS also revised their popular Morning Glory that year, notably adding a "parallel clean blend" to give players the ability to mix the affected and unaffected signals.

=== Collaborations ===
JHS has developed signature pedals for many artists, including Andy Timmons, Butch Walker, Stu G of Delirious?, Drew Shirley of Switchfoot, Mike Campbell of Tom Petty and the Heartbreakers, Paul Gilbert, and Madison Cunningham.

In 2015, JHS and Robert Keeley teamed up to create the Steak and Eggs overdrive/compressor. Two years later, JHS partnered with Boss to produce the Boss JB-2 Angry Driver, an overdrive/distortion that combines Boss's BD-2 Blues Driver and JHS's Angry Charlie. JHS collaborated that same year with Tim Marcus of Milkman Sound to produce the Milkman boost/slap delay. In 2019, JHS severed ties with Ryan Adams and stopped production of his signature pedal, the VCR, after Adams was accused of sexual misconduct. JHS announced they would be rebranding the remaining pedals to the Space Commander and using the proceeds to support work against sexual abuse and assault. JHS, Electro Harmonix, and graphic designer Daniel Danger collaborated in 2023 on the Lizard Queen, an octave fuzz pedal inspired by the original 1970s unit from EHX. A big box version of the Lizard Queen was limited to 1,000 units, thirty of which featured inverse colors.

JHS partnered with Ross Inc. in 2023 to reissue five new compressor, distortion, chorus, phaser and fuzz effect pedals from Ross's old product collection, with the fuzz pedal inspired by the fuzz circuitry of Kustom amplifiers, which were made by Ross at the time. After around only one year of production, the Ross line suffered a lack of demand and was discontinued. In 2025, JHS worked with Jack White and his pedal brand Third Man Hardware on the Troika delay pedal.

== Other ventures ==
=== Pedals: The Musical ===
On 13 and 14 March 2021, JHS Pedals debuted Pedals: The Musical, a musical comedy about guitar pedals (starring Josh Scott, Rhett Shull and Nick Loux) as a live YouTube JHS Show event. The production specifically focused on the first seven guitar pedals, invented between 1960 and 1970. Peter Kirn of CDM said that the production was "not quite Joseph and the Technicolor Dreamcoat so much as its own Red, White and Blaine. But it is historically accurate."

Josh Scott has announced plans for follow-up productions in the vein of Pedals: The Musical including performances focusing on the 70s, the 80s, the 90s, the 2000s, and the 2010s. Scott has been quoted saying "We want to do a prequel about the invention of the electric guitar from roughly 1931 through 1960. We want to do some straight plays – meaning just acting, no singing – about the lives of inventors like Les Paul, Leo Fender, George Beauchamp. All these people that have amazing narratives and stories, I could see us doing this for a long time; I’m pretty committed to it because I think it’s a fantastic avenue for teaching."

=== Guitar.com articles ===
Beginning in 2021, Josh Scott began writing a series of articles for Guitar.com chronicling the history of the electric guitar and, by extension, guitar pedals. In the series, Scott notably tied historical figures like Mark Twain, Benjamin Franklin, Henry Ford and Charles Darwin into the guitar history narrative.

== See also ==
- Earthquaker Devices
- Keeley Electronics
- Wampler Pedals
