= MXR Distortion + =

Distortion pedal from MXR

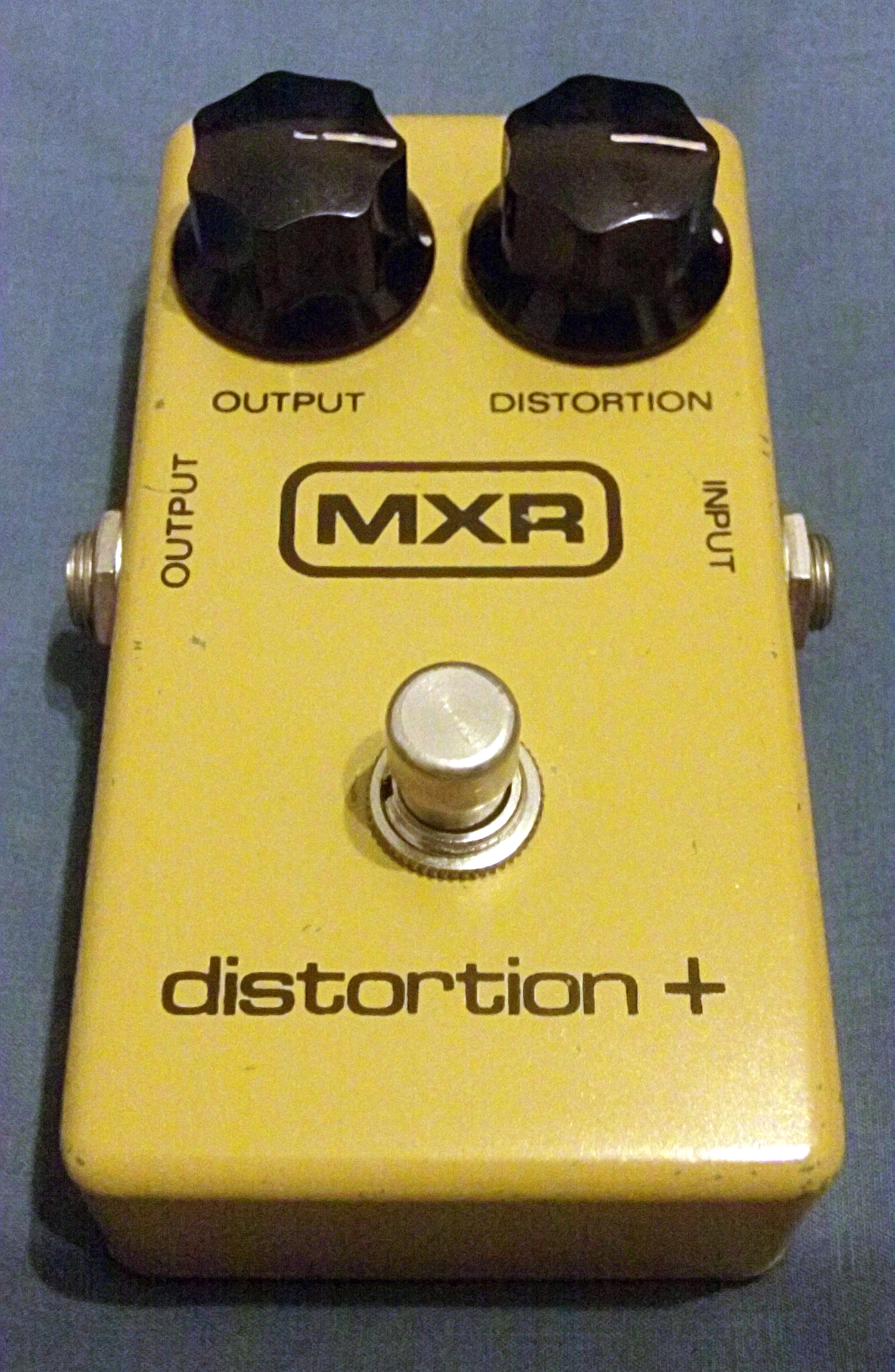
- 1979 MXR Distortion +
- Brand: MXR
- Manufacturer: MXR, Dunlop
- Dates: 1974–1984 (MXR); 1987–present (MXR/Dunlop)

Technical specifications
- Effects type: Distortion pedal

Controls
- Pedal control: Output, Distortion

Input/output
- Inputs: Mono
- Outputs: Mono

The MXR Distortion + ("Distortion Plus") is a distortion pedal originally released in 1974 by MXR.

== History ==
Following the success of their Phase 90, MXR released a trio of pedals in 1974 that included the Distortion +. MXR's pedals were notable for their small footprint at a time when effects pedals were typically housed in large enclosures; they were also durable, since MXR was initially founded to address the issue of other manufacturers' pedals being unreliable. In 1976, MXR changed the original "script" logos on their pedals like the Distortion + to their now-standard "block" logo. While the circuits did not change, the script logo models are more prized among collectors.

MXR went out of business in 1984 and the brand name was subsequently acquired by Dunlop Manufacturing, which reissued several early MXR designs, including the Distortion +, in 1987.

== Design ==
The pedal uses a single op-amp and a pair of germanium diodes to ground (parallel-push) for clipping in a very simple configuration with only Output and Distortion controls, no tone control; the pedal uses no discrete transistors. Turning up the Distortion control increases the amount of distortion and at the same time boosts the treble in the signal.

== Players ==
The pedal's crunchy heavy metal sound was featured by Randy Rhoads in his work with Ozzy Osbourne. Jerry Garcia of the Grateful Dead used this pedal exclusively for distortion in the late 1970s. Bob Mould of Hüsker Dü also used the Distortion +. Dave Murray of Iron Maiden has used Distortion + since the early 1980s. Steve Wynn used it on the first couple Dream Syndicate albums. Thom Yorke of Radiohead has included the Distortion + for many of his signature distortion sounds. Rowland S. Howard (The Birthday Party/These Immortal Souls/Crime & the City Solution/Solo albums) also used this pedal across his career. Guitarist Slash has talked about using the Distortion + in his early guitar days to help define his tone.

== See also ==
- List of distortion pedals
