= Wampler Pedals =

Manufacturer of guitar effects units based in Martinsville, Indiana

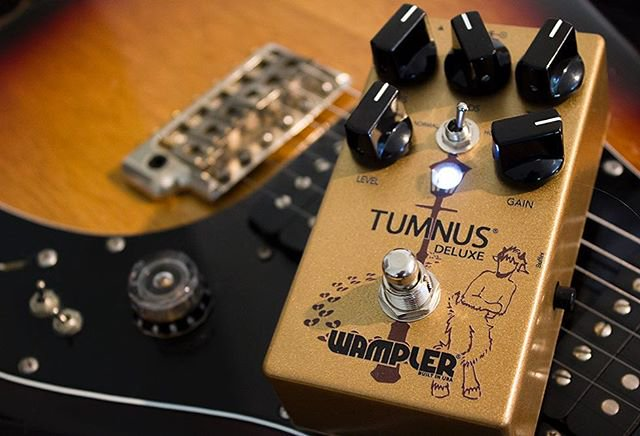
The Wampler Tumnus Deluxe, a Klon-style overdrive pedal.

Wampler Pedals is a company located in Martinsville, Indiana that produces effects units to be used with guitar and bass guitar as well as guitar amplifiers. Founded by Brian Wampler in 2007, Wampler Pedals is considered part of the boutique guitar pedal industry.

== History ==
Wampler Pedals originated from the hobbyist work of founder Brian Wampler. Wampler began playing guitar around age 7, and eventually became a self-proclaimed "gear nut". In 2001, Paul Weller, a friend of Wampler, modified a pedal for him, leading Wampler to learn more about how pedals worked and were designed. Wampler began to teach himself how pedals worked and were designed in his late 20s, using online resources like the DIYstompboxes.com community, mirroring the path of other boutique builders like Jamie Stillman of EarthQuaker Devices.

The Wampler Pedals name was formally adopted after Brian Wampler developed a personal brand and persona in the DIY guitar community. Wampler contributed to the DIY community via email exchanges that at times took up hours of each evening. In a move designed to professionalize his work, Wampler eventually self-published a series of books on guitar pedal design that he represents as helping launch the career of several popular boutique guitar pedal builders. In this early phase of the company's development, Brian Wampler operated under the name Indyguitarist. In 2007, the company began to operate under the Wampler Pedals name, which became official in 2009.

The company and its founder have participated in the DIY community by writing articles for Premier Guitar and hosting a podcast on guitar gear, Chasing Tone. The company also regularly posts blogs on gear-related topics as part of a larger content-strategy.

== Design and fabrication process ==
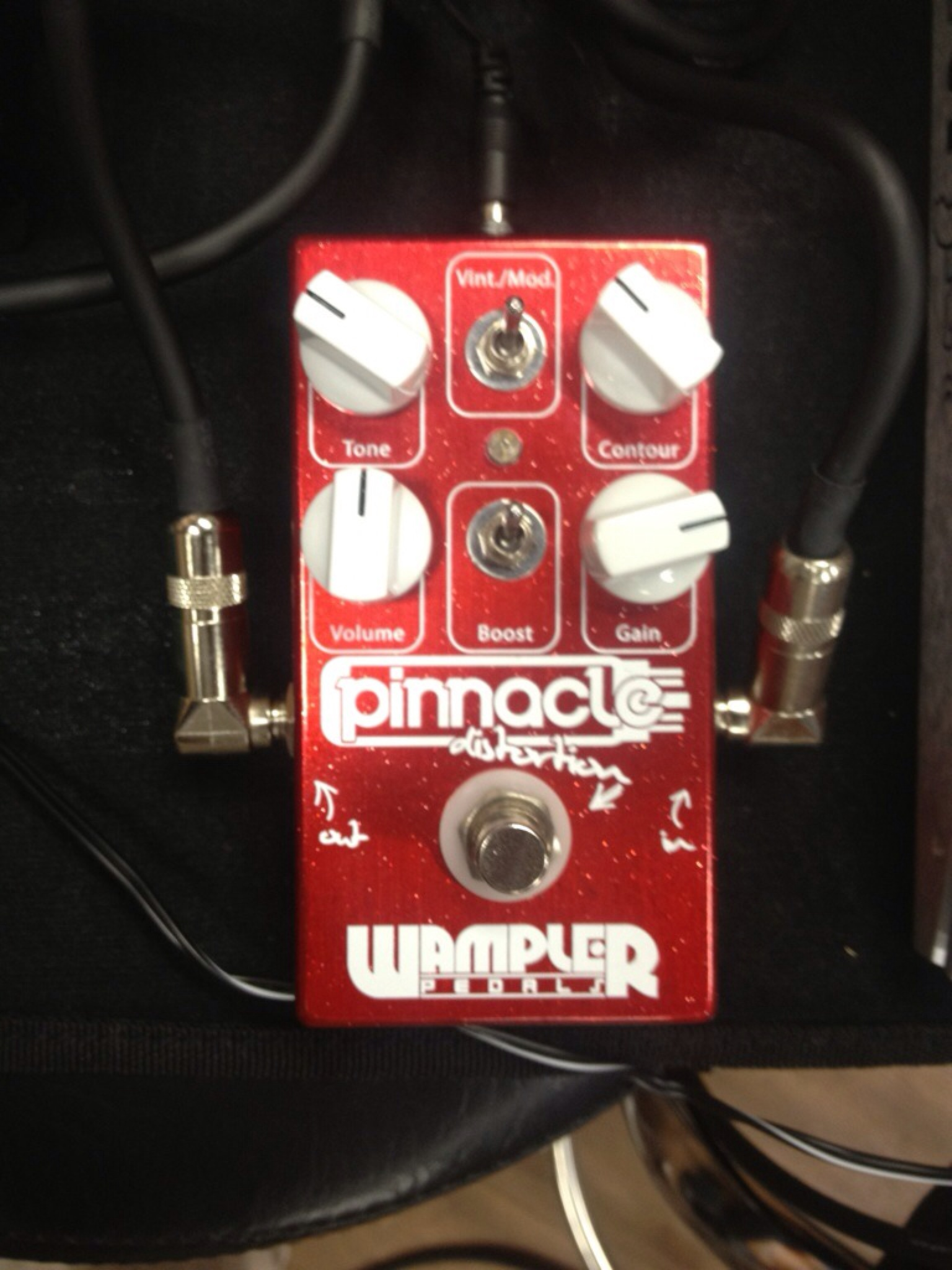
The Wampler Pinnacle distortion

Wampler pedals are primarily designed by Brian Wampler himself, and the design process can range from a few days to several years of development time on a breadboard. Once the breadboard design is finalized, the company generates prototypes that are distributed for testing before the design is finalized and produced.

Unlike similar boutique manufacturers such as JHS Pedals, Keeley Electronics, and EarthQuaker Devices, Wampler Pedals does not produce their pedals on-site at their company headquarters. Some of the company's first pedals were sold on eBay and produced in Wampler's garage before the company moved production to a factory in Kentucky owned by a friend of Wampler that also produced products for Warehouse Guitar Speakers. Presently, the company's pedals are manufactured and distributed by Boutique Amps Distribution in California, the same company behind other major brands such as Bogner, Friedman, Egnater, and Tone King. The move to Boutique Amps Distribution was cited as giving Wampler more time to focus on designing pedals and creating materials for the DIY community by offloading management and business concerns to the distributor.

== Artist collaborations and associated artists ==
Wampler Pedals is known for a series of pedals they have created with various artists, starting with their collaboration with Brad Paisley. The Paisley collaboration began when Wampler threw a modified pedal onto the stage at a Brad Paisley concert and followed up with the artist's technician after the event. Wampler Pedals has developed three signature pedals for Paisley, including the Paisley Drive, the Paisley Drive Deluxe, and The Doctor (a pedal used to produce the album Wheelhouse).

In addition to Paisley, the company has worked with Brent Mason as well as Cory Wong, Andy Wood, and Tom Quayle for signature pedals. Wampler pedals have been used by John Fogerty, Keith Urban, and Lance Lopez.

== Notable products ==
Wampler has several notable products that have gained recognition in various ways. The Underdog, a limited run pedal created to raise money for a victim of breast cancer, gained exposure after it became a part of Brad Paisley's guitar rig. It was eventually incorporated into Wampler's Paisley Drive Deluxe.

The company also had to change the names of a small number of their pedals due to name conflict issues. These include:

- Euphoria (formerly the Ecstasy)
- Thirty Something (formerly known as the Ace Thirty)
- Tumnus (graphical changes after a request from the C.S. Lewis Foundation)
