= List of distortion pedals =

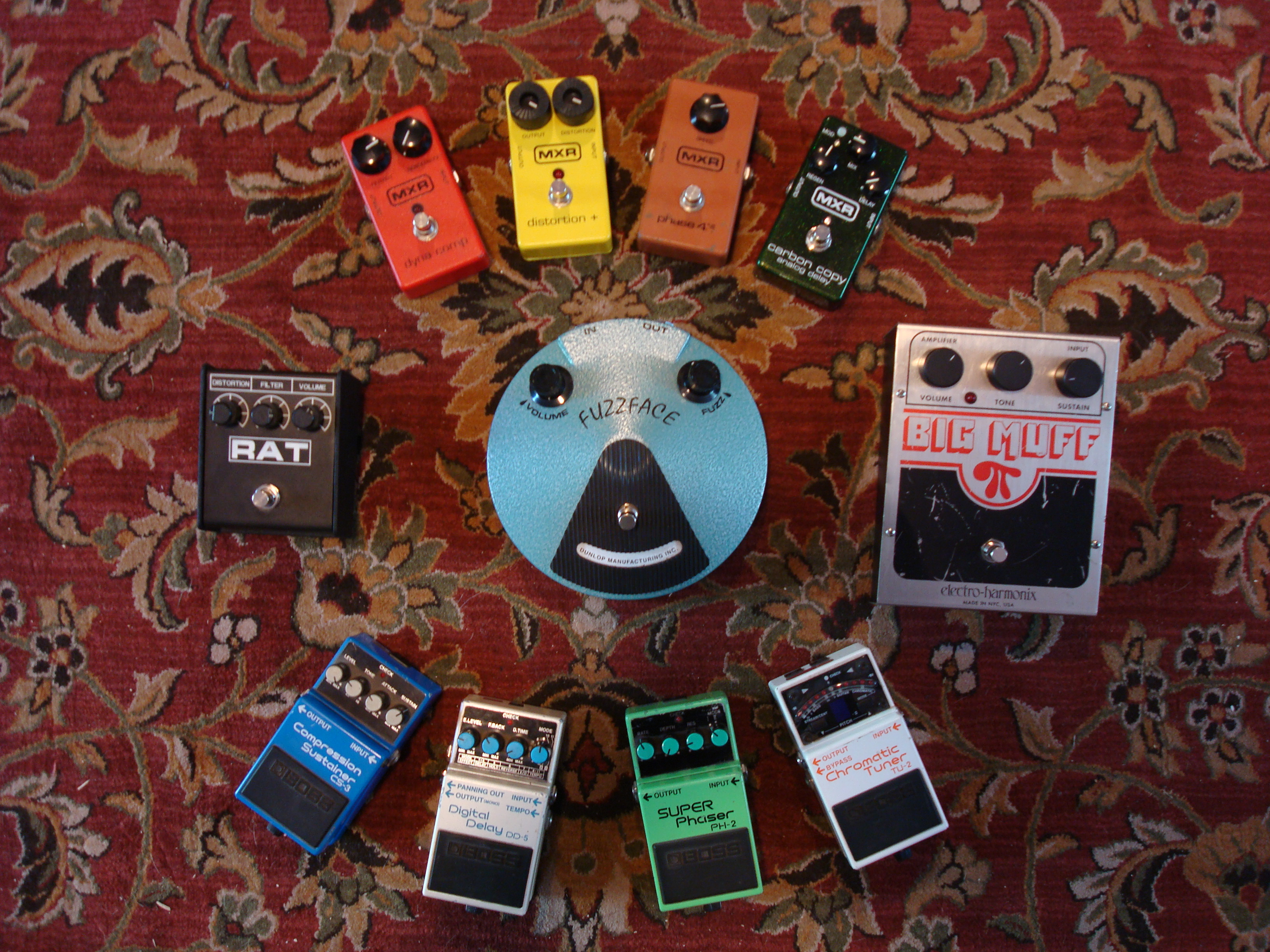
A collection of effects pedals, including several distortions: an MXR Distortion + (top row, second from left), and a Pro Co Rat, Arbiter Fuzz Face, and Electro-Harmonix Big Muff (all middle row, from left).

Distortion pedals are a type of effects unit designed to add distortion to an audio signal to create a warm, gritty, or fuzzy character. Depending on the style of signal clipping, the broader category of distortion pedals is typically divided into fuzz pedals, distortion pedals, and overdrive pedals. Designed for electric guitar and bass and operated by the player's foot, distortion pedals are most frequently placed in the signal chain between the guitar and amplifier.

The use of distortion pedals was popularized by Keith Richards' use of a Maestro FZ-1 Fuzz-Tone pedal on the 1965 Rolling Stones song "(I Can't Get No) Satisfaction". Later pedals like the Pro Co Rat and Ibanez Tube Screamer have achieved iconic status among guitarists and are a key element in many players' tones. Industry publications often publish lists of influential and popular models.

== Classification ==
While "distortion" is the technical term for the different sounds caused by signal clipping, distortion effects pedals—which act as small amplifier circuits—are typically further classified into fuzz, distortion, and overdrive, depending on the circuit design and how the waveform is affected. Fuzz pedals came to the market first, with these pedals seeking to replicate the harmonic content generated by an amplifier being faulty or damaged. This sound is often characterized as harsh, with the waveform the most heavily affected of the three types, reaching nearly a square wave. To create their effect, fuzz pedals use lo-fi transistors.

Conventional overdrives, like the Ibanez Tube Screamer, use diodes within the feedback loop of an op amp, so the signal does not fully distort or clip and results in a milder effect. This is known as "soft-clipping," or overdrive. The affected waveform maintains rounded peaks with the intent to emulate and/or complement a traditional vacuum tube-based amplifier. Some overdrives are meant to "color" the affected tone, while others are meant to be relatively transparent, adding drive but otherwise mostly preserving the guitar and amp's basic character. When the diodes are placed at the end of the circuit, however, the entirety of the signal is clipped. This is known as "hard-clipping," or distortion, which has a more aggressive sound and dramatic effect on the underlying tone, with angular peaks in the affected waveform. Because overdrive and distortion pedals both typically use op amps and diodes, the line between the two types can blur. The Klon Centaur, for example, is hard-clipping but considered a classic overdrive, while the MXR Distortion + and DOD Overdrive 250 Preamp have nearly identical (hard-clipping) circuits despite the opposing use of "Distortion" and "Overdrive" in their names.

Some overdrive and distortion pedals, similarly to fuzzes, use transistors and therefore do not have soft- or hard-clipping circuitry. These transistors are arranged in stages, cascading into one another for a more saturated sound, in a similar fashion to overdriving multiple vacuum tubes in an amp. Examples include the Boss Blues Driver and "amp in a box" overdrives like the Marshall JTM45-emulating Z.Vex Box of Rock.

== Fuzz pedals ==
=== Arbiter Fuzz Face ===
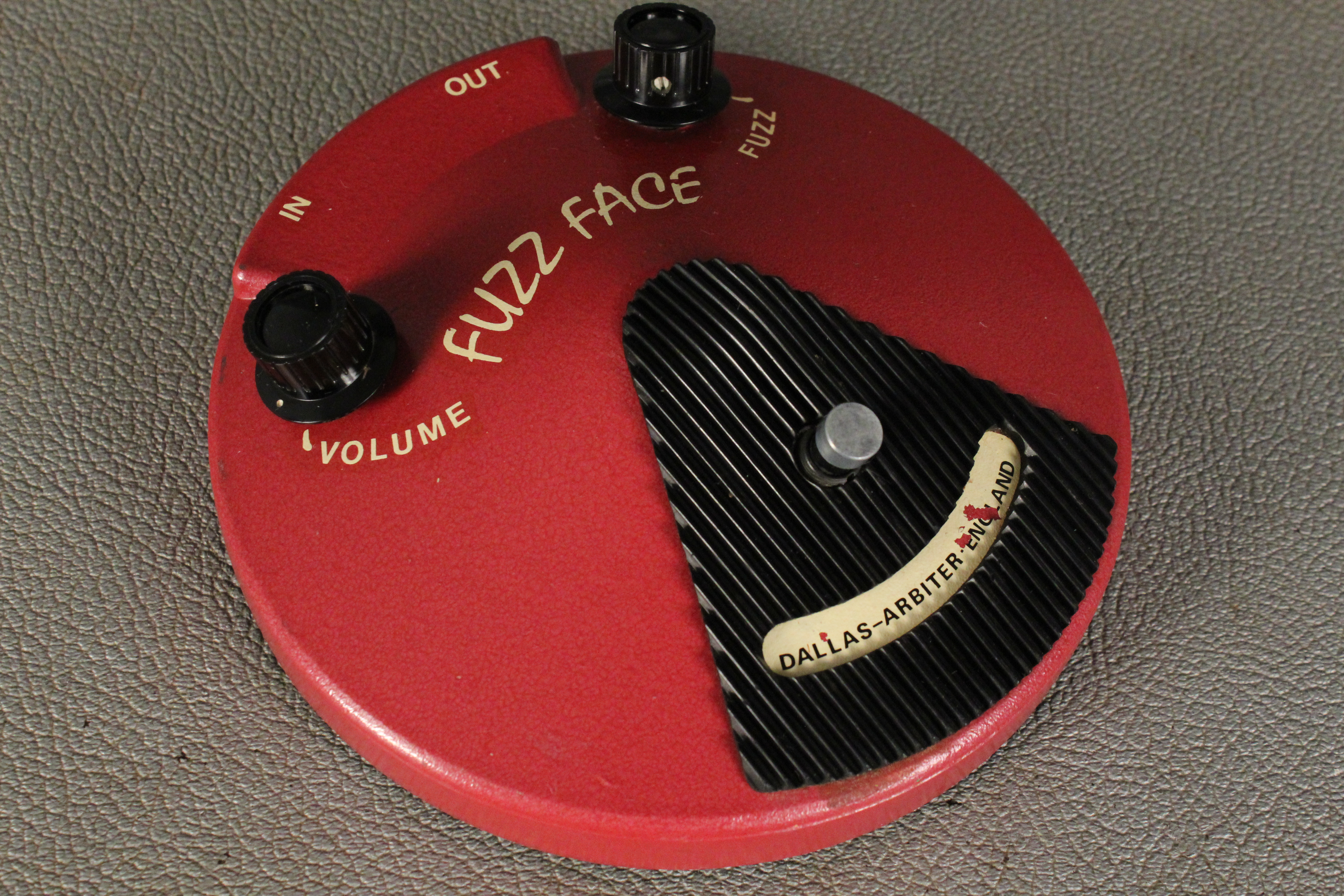
Dallas Arbiter Fuzz Face

Arbiter Electronics released the first Fuzz Face in 1966, featuring a unique round metal housing inspired by a microphone stand and with the arrangement of volume knob, distortion knob, and logo intentionally resembling a face. The Fuzz Face's first production run lasted until 1976/77, then was reissued from 1986 until 1990. In 1993, Dunlop Manufacturing took over production and has continued to issue several varieties of the pedal. Jimi Hendrix popularized the Fuzz Face and was known to buy multiple copies at a time to identify the best ones; his pedal chain often consisted of a wah-wah pedal into a Fuzz Face, then into a Uni-Vibe. Other notable users include Duane Allman, Stevie Ray Vaughan Pete Townshend, Eric Johnson, and George Harrison.

=== Electro-Harmonix Big Muff ===
The Big Muff Pi (π), often known simply as the Big Muff, is a fuzz pedal produced in New York City by the Electro-Harmonix company, along with their Russian sister company Sovtek, primarily for use with the electric guitar. Released in 1969 and designed with an emphasis on long sustain compared to existing fuzzes, the Big Muff Pi was the first overwhelming success for Electro-Harmonix's line of pedals. Due to its reliability, its low price, and its distinctive sound, the Big Muff sold consistently through the 1970s and was found in numerous guitarists' pedal collections, including David Gilmour and Carlos Santana. The "sustained grind" of the Big Muff was later an integral part of the sound of many alternative rock bands through the 1980s and 1990s, being used extensively by the Smashing Pumpkins, Dinosaur Jr., NOFX, Bush and Mudhoney.

=== Maestro FZ-1 Fuzz-Tone ===
The Maestro FZ-1 Fuzz-Tone was the first widely marketed fuzz distortion guitar and bass effect. Introduced in 1962, it achieved widespread popularity after Keith Richards' prominent use of an FZ-1 on the Rolling Stones' 1965 hit "(I Can't Get No) Satisfaction". Later in 1965, the design was slightly modified and designated as the model FZ1-1a. In the wake of the success of "Satisfaction," numerous recordings (mostly from 1960s garage rock and psychedelic acts) featured Maestro Fuzz-Tones on guitar. More significant design changes made after 1967 resulted in different renditions of the Fuzz-Tone released over the years. In the 1990s, Gibson re-issued the FZ-1a, but it was later discontinued.

=== Sola Sound / Vox Tone Bender ===
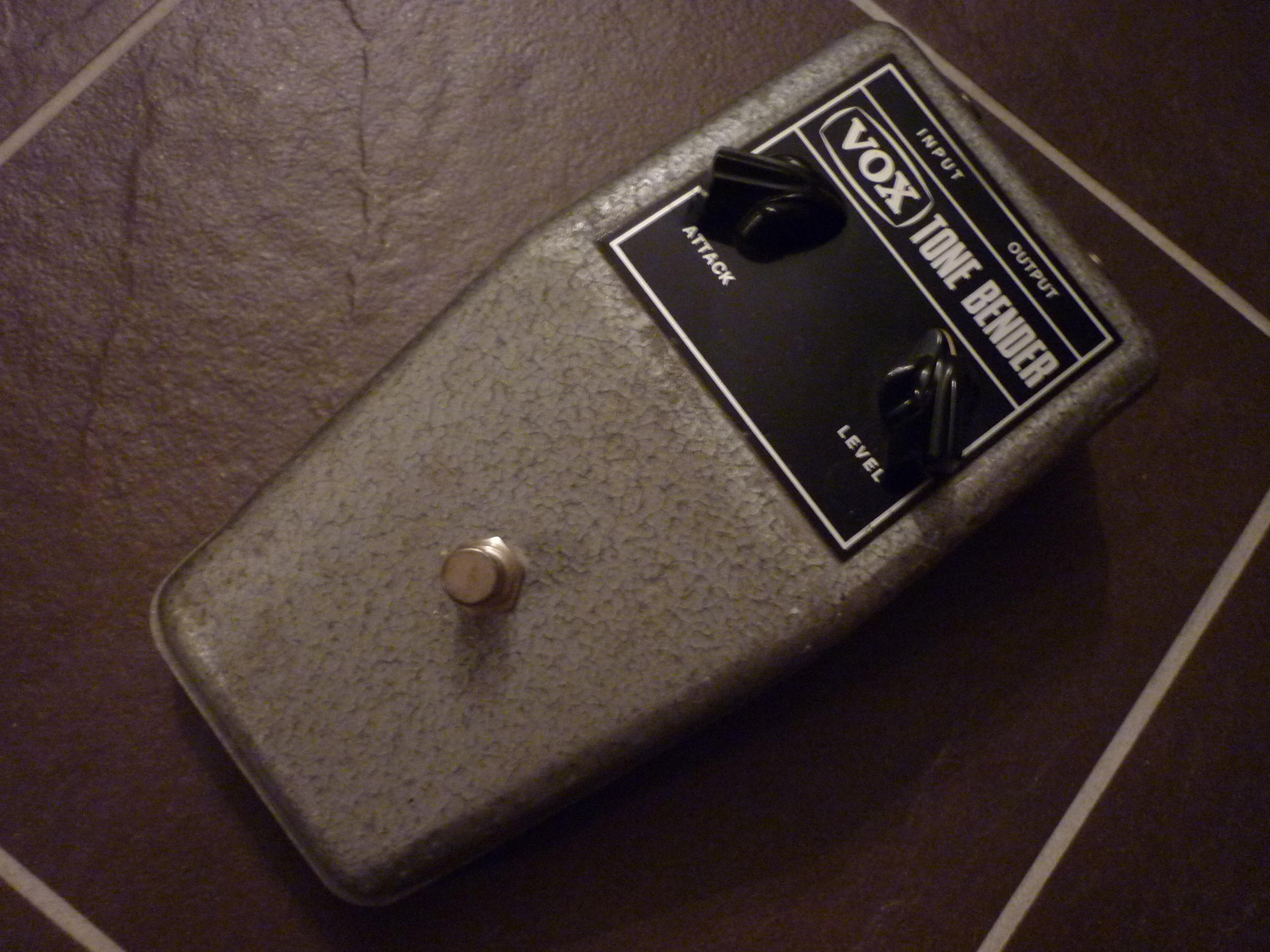
A 1966 Vox Tone Bender fuzz pedal.

Released in 1965, Sola Sound's Tone Bender was a re-creation of the popular Maestro Fuzz-Tone, but with more sustain and intended for the European market. For U.S. distribution, Vox released a version in 1967 based on Sola Sound's MK1.5 Tone Bender update, one of many the pedal went through. With different component values and transistors being used over the years, earlier variants are fuller sounding, while later ones are bright and cutting. Notable examples of the Tone Bender in use include Jeff Beck's sitar-like guitar solo on the Yardbirds' 1965 song "Heart Full of Soul" and Mick Ronson's guitar work on David Bowie's 1972 song "Moonage Daydream".

=== Univox Super-Fuzz ===
The Univox Super-Fuzz circuit was designed in the late 1960s by the Japanese company Honey, in the form of a multi-effect called the Honey Psychedelic Machine. Later on, Honey was acquired by Shin-ei, who produced the effect separately and imported it to the USA via Unicord, the parent company of Univox. The first Super-Fuzzes were made in 1968, and production continued until the late 70s. The pedal is unique in that the full-wave rectification of the circuit produces an upper octave as well as a slight lower octave. This also gives the sound a lot of compression and a mild ring modulator effect. A second unique feature is a tone switch that engages a 1 kHz filter that "scoops" the mids, giving a fat, bassy tone.

=== Z.Vex Fuzz Factory ===
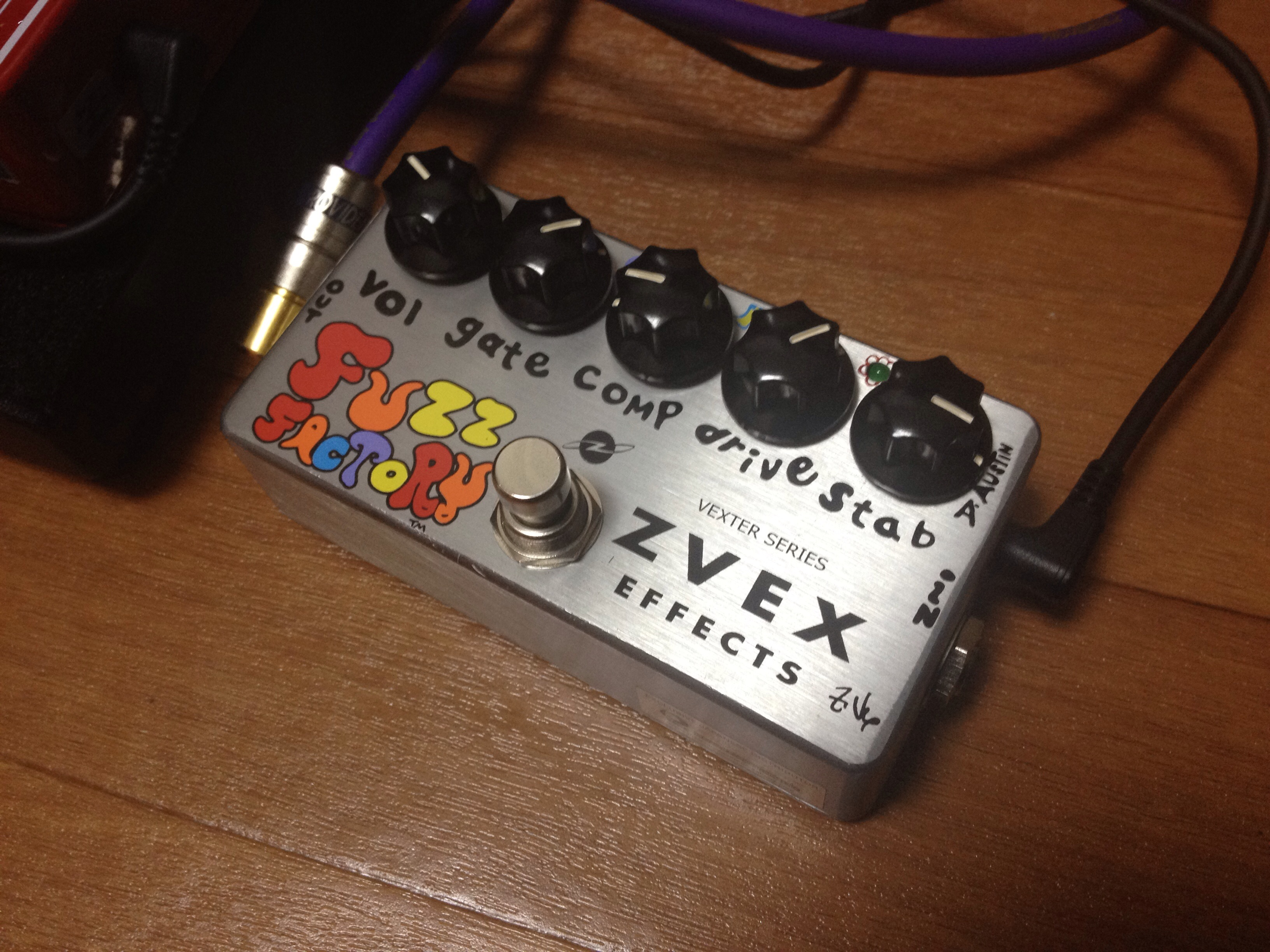
Z.Vex Fuzz Factory

The Fuzz Factory, designed overnight in 1994, was the second pedal from Z.Vex-founder Zachary Vex. The design began with a collection of unique germanium transistors Vex purchased from a surplus store with the intent of creating a fuzz pedal similar to a Fuzz Face. While initially disappointed by the transistors' sound, Vex added a booster to the front of the circuit and the pedal went "haywire" with squealing and odd noises. Vex replaced the fixed-value resistors with pots to gain control over the sounds, leading to a layout of five-knobs—three of which he could not easily describe the function of. The local dealer Vex took the first Fuzz Factories to objected to the layout, feeling customers would be confused, but Vex insisted this would mean buyers could find their own sounds. Dubbed a "masterpiece" by Guitar World for being intuitive yet "near-infinite in its tone-sculpting potential," the pedal's success established Vex as a pivotal figure in the popularization of boutique effects pedals.

== Distortion pedals ==
=== Boss DS-1 Distortion ===
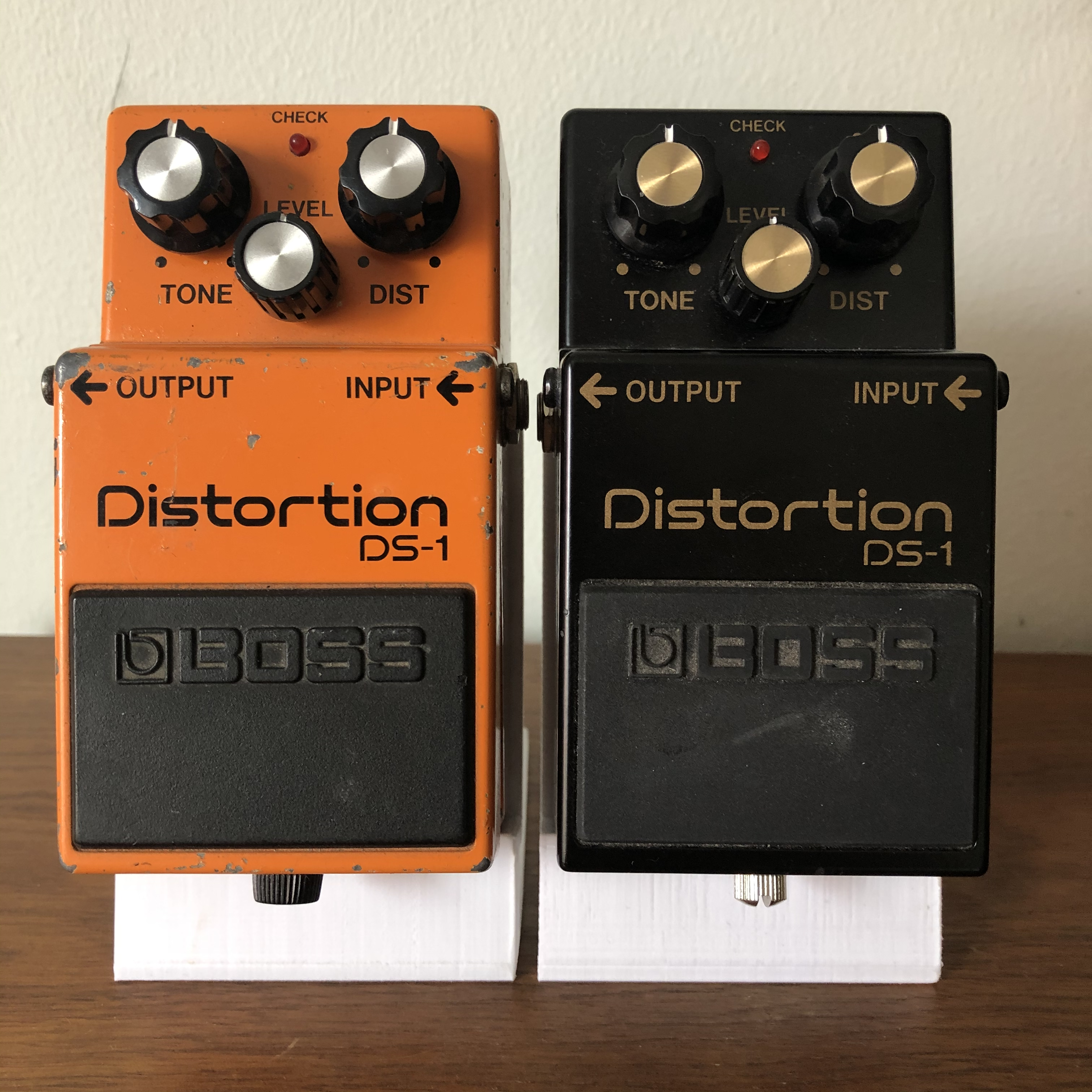
Boss DS-1 original (left) and DS-1-4A anniversary edition (right)

Introduced in 1978, the DS-1 was Boss's first distortion pedal, and second pedal release overall, following the CE-1 Chorus Ensemble. The DS-1 uses two hard-clipping diodes for an aggressive edge, similar to the ProCo Rat, released the same year. This type of circuit became known as "distortion," as opposed to the soft-clipping "overdrive" of Boss's later overdrive pedals. The DS-1 uses a preamplifier instead of the conventional op-amp for a gritty, warm tone. When the original Toshiba TA7136AP preamp became scarce, the circuit was redesigned in 1994, introducing several "quirks"—lower volume levels, noise at higher gain levels, and a "waspy" edge due to higher frequencies not being filtered out. These issues led to the pedal being popular among modifiers. The DS-1 is Boss's bestselling "drive" pedal of all time.

=== Boss HM-2 Heavy Metal ===
The Boss HM-2, first issued in October 1983, was manufactured in Japan until 1988, then in Taiwan until 1991. It was designed to emulate the mid-range response of a Marshall stack. Achieving only moderate success in the glam metal scene, the pedal was discontinued in 1991; it was succeeded by the HM-3 Hyper Metal and MT-2 Metal Zone, the latter of which became a commercial success and top-selling pedal for Boss. Following its discontinuance, the HM-2 developed a cult following in the heavy metal scene and is especially associated with Swedish death metal. In 2020, Boss renewed production of the pedal as the HM-2W, part of its Japanese-made, boutique-grade "Waza Craft" series.

=== Boss MT-2 Metal Zone ===
The MT-2 Metal Zone was released in 1991, following the discontinuation of the earlier HM-2, which failed to sell well during its production run, but was popular among death metal players. With the MT-2, Boss sought to appeal to that market with an improved pedal as death metal's popularity surged. The pedal's thick, saturated, tight tone and the extreme sounds the pedal was able to produce thanks to its powerful EQ controls made the MT-2 divisive both upon its release and throughout its ongoing production. Despite this, the pedal has found fans in metal and other genres, including Prince and Joe Bonamassa.

The Metal Zone has sold over a million units, making it the company's best-selling overdrive or distortion pedal behind only the DS-1.

=== DOD FX69 Grunge ===
DOD Electronics launched the FX69 Grunge distortion pedal in 1993, intending to capitalize on the sudden popularity of grunge and its Seattle-born bands. The Grunge was the first release in a reimagining of the DOD product line, as DOD had been turned over to skateboarder-turned-pedal-designer Jason Lamb. Rather than use conventionally descriptive labels for each of its four control knobs, Lamb and DOD labeled them "Loud", "Butt", "Face", and "Grunge", while painting the pedal with brash graphics that appealed to the "angsty late-night MTV" crowd. The pedal was an immediate success, selling thousands of units a month and going on to become DOD's best-selling distortion pedal. Kurt Cobain notably had a Grunge pedal as part of his setup in late 1993; that same pedal would sell at auction for $16,000 in 2021.

=== Marshall Shredmaster ===
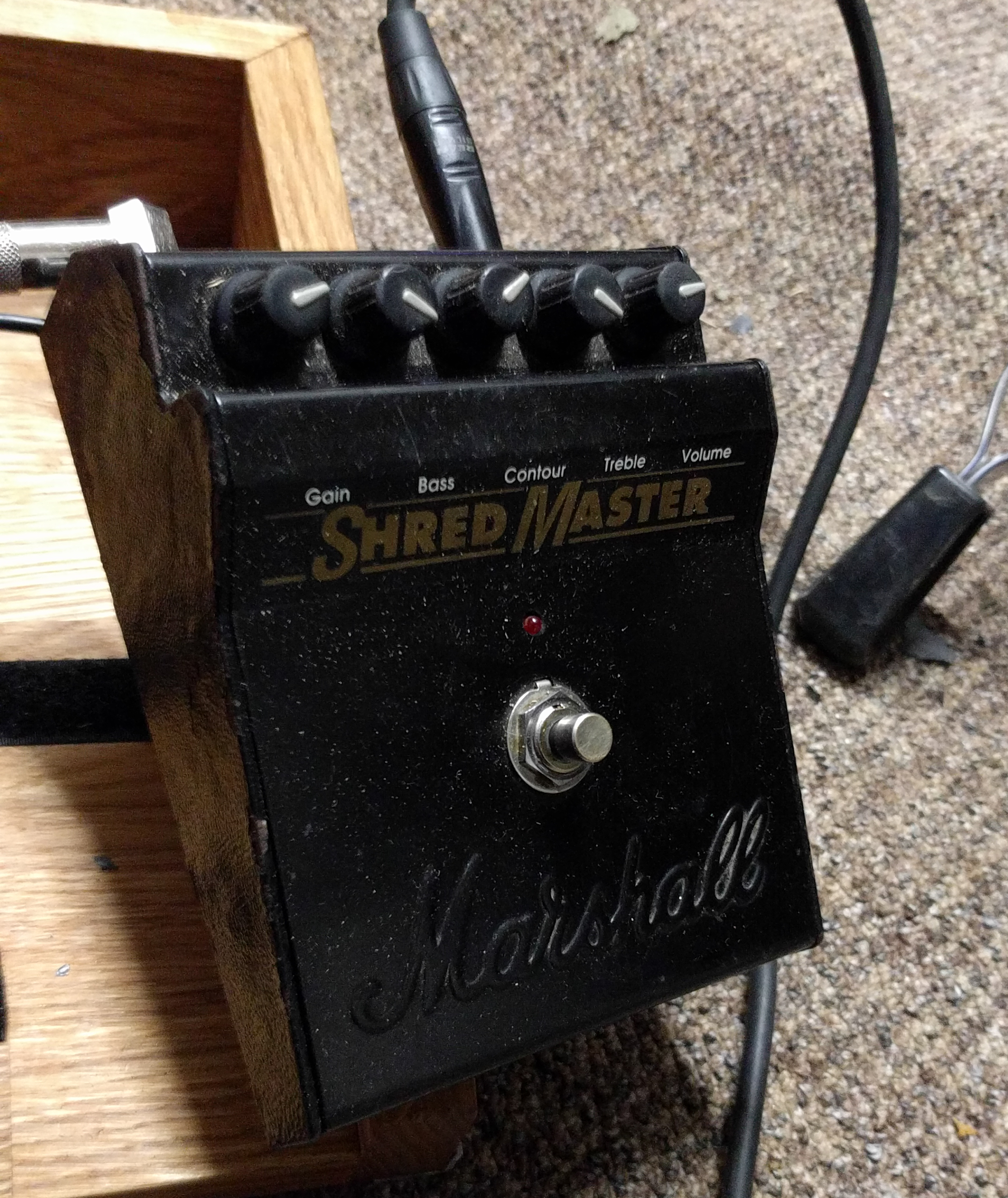
Marshall Shredmaster

The Shredmaster was the high-gain pedal in a trio of pedals—including the Bluesbreaker and Drivemaster—released by Marshall in 1991, superseding the brand's first overdrive, the Guv'nor. Like the Bluesbreaker and Drivemaster, the Shredmaster had a black, wedged-shaped metal enclosure with a raised contour that protected the pedal's controls, which consisted in this case of Gain, Bass, Contour, Treble, and Volume. Contour altered the character of the midrange while enhancing low and high frequencies. Unlike the other two pedals, which replicated the tones of specific Marshall amps, the Shredmaster was a conventional distortion pedal. With poor sales, the pedals were discontinued a few years after their release. It was used by the guitarist Jonny Greenwood on many 1990s Radiohead songs. Marshall reissued the Shredmaster, Bluesbreaker, Drivemaster, and Guv'nor in 2023 as its Vintage Reissue series, in response to the pedals having become sought-after vintage gear despite their initial unpopularity.

=== MXR Distortion + ===
Following the success of their Phase 90, MXR released a trio of pedals in 1974 that included the Distortion +. MXR's pedals were notable for their small footprint at a time when effects pedals were typically housed in large enclosures; they were also durable, since MXR was initially founded to address the issue of other manufacturers' pedals being unreliable. The Distortion + follows a simple design, with output and distortion controls and a hard-clipping circuit based around a single op amp and two germanium diodes. The result is a gritty character that blurs the line between distortion and fuzz. Housed in a yellow case, the Distortion + is inexpensive and as a result it became many guitarists' first distortion pedal and also a popular option for pedal modders. MXR went out of business in 1984, but the brand was resurrected three years later by Dunlop Manufacturing, which reissued the Distortion + alongside other early MXR pedals. Fans of the Distortion + have included Randy Rhoads in his work with Ozzy Osbourne, Jerry Garcia of the Grateful Dead, Dave Murray of Iron Maiden, and Thom Yorke of Radiohead.

=== Pro Co Rat ===
Developed in 1978 and released a year later, the Pro Co Rat was the first mass-produced distortion pedal. In the Rat, Pro Co's engineers sought to improve upon the earlier Fuzz Face and ultimately designed a pedal with, as Guitar World wrote, a "hard, aggressive sound and tight, focused clipping" that set the template for modern distortion circuits. The pedal's layout is simple, with Volume and Distortion controls, as well as a low-pass Filter control that cuts highs as it is turned clockwise. While the basic circuit of the standard Rat has remained largely unchanged since its release, Pro Co has released numerous other versions of it over the following decades, such as the Turbo Rat and You Dirty Rat. The pedal is often praised for its tone, versatility, and affordability, and its enduring popularity has spawned numerous clones and tributes from other pedal manufacturers.

== Overdrive pedals ==
=== 1981 Inventions DRV ===
In 2017, rock band Relient K went on hiatus, leaving guitarist Matt Hoopes to pursue other ventures like his interest in boutique effects pedals. Hoopes had previously explored the idea of collaborating with his friend Jon Ashley on a signature drive pedal, and while Ashley was willing to complete the project, he declined to release it under his own brand, Bondi Effects, and encouraged Hoopes to start his own company. Under the banner of 1981 Inventions—named for the year his favorite Tube Screamer was produced, not his birth year—Hoopes released his pedal as the DRV in June 2018. While originally based on a 1985 "Whiteface" Pro Co Rat, Ashley implemented multiple circuit changes, such as adding a fixed-level preamp, revising the filter sweep and level, and reducing the amount of gain to "around 1/20th" of what a typical RAT produces. The DRV's first production run sold out overnight, with praise for its unique take on the oft-imitated RAT circuit. Produced in small batches and dressed in a colorful, minimalist style, Guitar.com credited the DRV with generating more "hype" than any other pedal in years, if not a decade. Much of the DRV's attention has been focused on the pedal's aesthetics (and expanding number of colorways), which earned the pedal the label of being an "Instagram darling". Hoopes said of his pedal's styling, "Minimal design and negative space is very important to me, and also to have a sort of personality and vibe with it is important, and I feel like this branding accomplishes that." According to Hoopes, the DRV's success has flipped pedal-building into his primary job and Relient K into a side hustle.

=== Analog.Man King of Tone ===
The King of Tone, released in 2005, was designed by former software engineer Mike Piera to create an improved version of the then-discontinued Marshall Bluesbreaker pedal. A two-sided pedal with independent controls and internal DIP switches to choose between boost, overdrive, and distortion modes, Piera started building the pedals by hand in Bethel, Connecticut and selling them online under the moniker "Analog.Man." Orders soon reached 200 per day—far more than Piera could keep up with—and the King of Tone developed a famously years-long waiting list, while prices on the used market far exceeded the cost of a new pedal. To satisfy demand, Piera developed a single-sided variation, the Prince of Tone, that would be manufactured in China, but still in limited numbers that sold out quickly. In 2022, Analog.Man partnered with MXR to release a smaller-format, mass-produced version, the Duke of Tone, which in 2023 became MXR's bestselling pedal.

=== B.K. Butler/Chandler Tube Driver ===
While conventional solid-state overdrive pedals often claim to produce "tube-like" tones, Brent K. Butler began designing actual tube-based overdrives in the 1970s and selling them under different brands. In 1985, Butler partnered with Chandler Electronics to produce the original Chandler Tube Driver, which used an op-amp for distortion and a 12AX7/ECC83 preamp tube to color the pedal's sound; it also ran on mains power, which necessitated the pedal using a characteristically oversized case. Several iterations of the Tube Driver have been released, including a rackmount version. The original pedal had controls for output level, high EQ, low EQ, and drive. A custom "Bias" knob was later added at the request of Eric Johnson to control the tube cathode current (and by extension the circuit's gain, texture, and dynamics) and this became a popular modification. The Butler/Chandler partnership lasted only two years, with Butler selling his own B.K. Butler-branded Tube Driver model from then on. The Tube Driver has been a longtime staple in the rigs of several iconic players, including David Gilmour, Billy Gibbons, Joe Satriani, and Johnson, who is especially well known for crafting his "violin-like" lead tones using the pedal, as heard on songs like "Cliffs of Dover".

=== Boss BD-2 Blues Driver ===
In 1995, Boss released the BD-2 Blue Driver, an overdrive pedal aimed at blues players who sought to add drive while maintaining their amp's signal clarity and dynamics. At the time, blues was experiencing a resurgence thanks to guitarists like Eric Clapton and Gary Moore. The pedal has a clear, punchy tone and features a flatter EQ-curve than pedals like the Ibanez Tube Screamer, while at higher gain levels it takes on an "edgy, grinding" quality. The BD-2 achieves its sound via a relatively complex circuit that mimics a tube preamp, with a tone-stack meant to imitate a Fender combo-style amp and the use of transistors, rather than its diodes, to create a series of cascading gain stages. Although mainstream interest in blues rock has waned since the pedal's release, it remains one of the most popular overdrives on the market thanks to its dynamic, amp-like qualities. The Blues Driver is also a common platform for modifications, with boutique pedal makers like Robert Keeley and Josh Scott offering popular modding services. Boss went on to collaborate with Scott on the Boss JB-2 Angry Driver, which combines the BD-2 and the Marshall-esque JHS Angry Charlie circuits into one pedal.

=== Boss OD-1 Overdrive ===
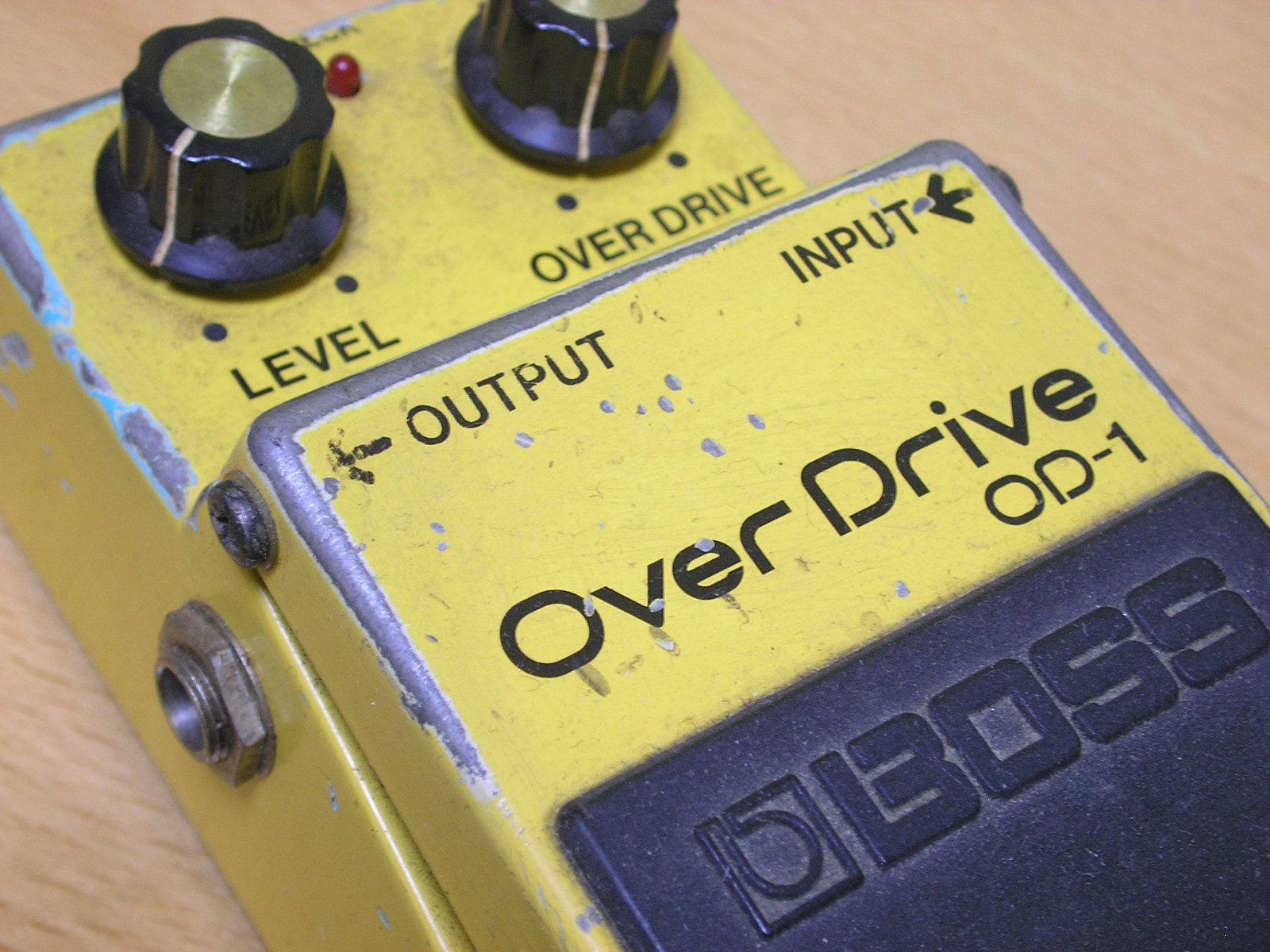
A Boss OD-1 Overdrive pedal.

By the mid-1970s, hard rock had popularized heavily distorted tones, but achieving such tones required high volume levels without a "master volume", which was at the time a new feature in few amps. With the 1977 release of the OD-1 Overdrive, Boss sought to offer guitarists a way to achieve the sound of power amp distortion at lower volume levels on any amp. The OD-1's "overdrive" referenced the pedal's asymmetrical soft-clipping, tube-like distortion, which stood in contrast to the brash sound of "fuzz" pedals on the market. The OD-1's layout was simple with only "Level" and "Over Drive" controls. It was an immediate success, paving the way for future compact overdrive pedals. As rock music became more aggressive, however, the pedal's voicing became considered overly "sweet," while the fixed frequency limited its versatility. With the surging popularity of the OD-1-influenced Tube Screamer and its addition of a tone control, Boss began including a "Tone" knob on its overdrive-style pedals with the 1981 SD-1 and the OD-1 was discontinued in 1985. Boss continued the Overdrive line with the four-knob OD-2 Turbo Overdrive, produced from 1985 to 1995, and subsequently the three-knob OD-3, which is still in production.

=== Boss SD-1 Super Overdrive ===
The Super Overdrive was released in 1981 as Boss's second overdrive pedal, adding a tone control to the earlier OD-1 design while refining the circuit for more gain and aggression in its voicing. The SD-1 retained its predecessor's asymmetrical clipping and inherent midrange-focus, but its circuit was altered, seeking to replicate the effect of slightly mismatched output tubes in an amplifier, which was thought to enhance an amp's character and "cutting power." The clipping's updated placement earlier in the circuit also introduced a "slightly jagged, granular drive tone" that helped the affected guitar tone stand out in a mix. With these changes, the SD-1 was quickly embraced by the growing hard rock and heavy metal subgenres, with guitarists frequently using it to boost already-overdriven amplifiers like the Marshall JCM800 into higher-gain sounds. The pedal is notable as a staple budget offering—frequently chosen as a guitarist's first overdrive—that has remained widely popular among professional rock players, with fans like Kirk Hammett, Jonny Greenwood, Mark Knopfler, Prince, and The Edge. In 2021, Boss released a 40th anniversary edition of the pedal, with the original circuit having remained unchanged since its introduction. Guitar dubbed the pedal one of only a handful to ever achieve "truly iconic status."

=== DOD Overdrive Preamp 250 ===
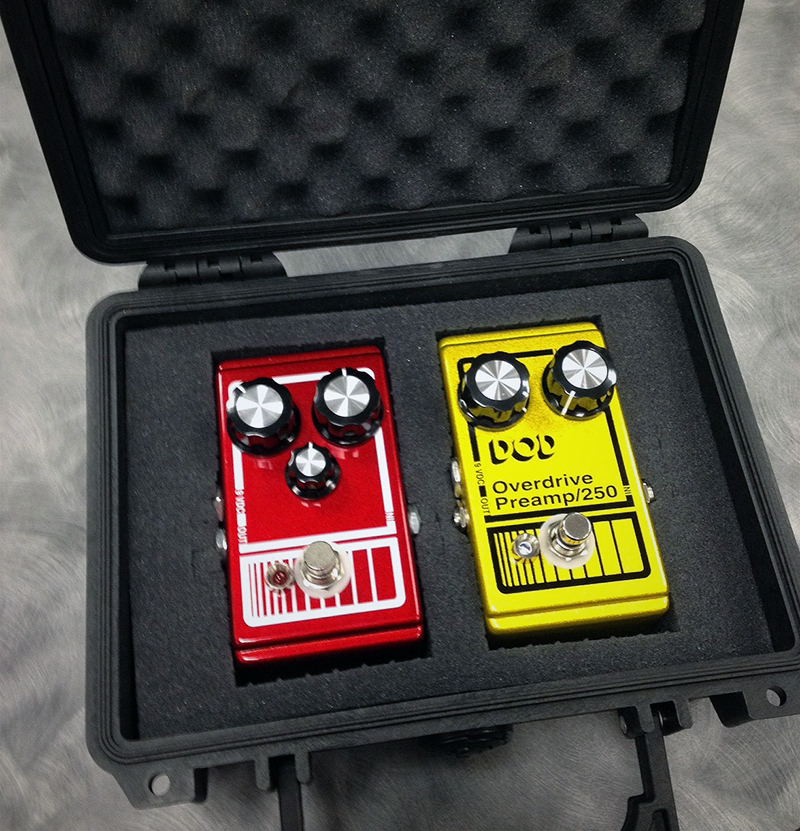
An Overdrive Preamp 250 on the right.

Utah-based DOD Electronics released the initial version of their Overdrive Preamp 250 in 1974, as simply the Overdrive Preamp. Its large enclosure was soon replaced with what became DOD's better-known compact cases (first in grey-and-yellow, then yellow-and-black), and it now bore additional 250 text. The 250 became the most popular pedal in DOD's early product lineup, helping establish the company as a major player—marketed as "America's Pedal"—in the early era of guitar effects pedals. The 250 was originally a slight circuit variation of the Distortion + by MXR, DOD's most direct competitor in the US market. The two pedals differed primarily in the 250's use of silicon diodes instead of the germanium diodes of the Distortion +, which made a significant difference in the two pedals' tone and feel given the overall simplicity of their designs. The 250 had only two large control knobs, for "Gain" and "Level", and while it lacked the tone control of later overdrive and distortion pedals, its silicon diodes allowed players to produce a brighter tone by driving the incoming signal harder. Following its debut, the 250 went through several circuit changes—mostly changes in input capacitor values and, less importantly, op-amp model—which, while minor, has nonetheless led to a long-running debate among fans over which version is best.

Digitech acquired DOD in 1990 and the 250 was reissued several times, including with the JRC4558 op-amp popularized by the Tube Screamer. Digitech was later bought by Cor-Tek, the parent company of Cort Guitars, and in 2013 the 250 was reissued once again, this time as a more faithful replica of the original design. A 1,974-unit limited edition run of the 250 was released in 2024 to celebrate its 50th anniversary, with this version adding new clipping options to the circuit. JHS Pedals founder Josh Scott called the 250 "one of the greatest pedals ever made".

=== Fulltone Full-Drive 2 ===
With the 1996 release of the Full-Drive 2, Fulltone had one of the effects pedal industry's biggest early success in boutique overdrives, with the FD2 a common sight on professional guitarists' pedalboards in the late 1990s. Described as picking up where the Ibanez Tube Screamer and Boss SD-1 left off, the FD2 features expanded tonal controls in a larger housing compared to other popular overdrives, with a separate boost footswitch and multiple clipping options to alter the pedal's midrange character and compression. Guitar World dubbed the Full-Drive 2 a "Tube Screamer killer," praising it for emphasizing desirable midrange frequencies while offering a larger pallet of overdrive textures. The Full-Drive 2 has gone through multiple iterations, including a popular MOSFET version. Fulltone rebooted the pedal in 2018 with the Full-Drive 2 V2, which swaps the boost for a second overdrive channel and adds further clipping options.

=== Fulltone OCD ===
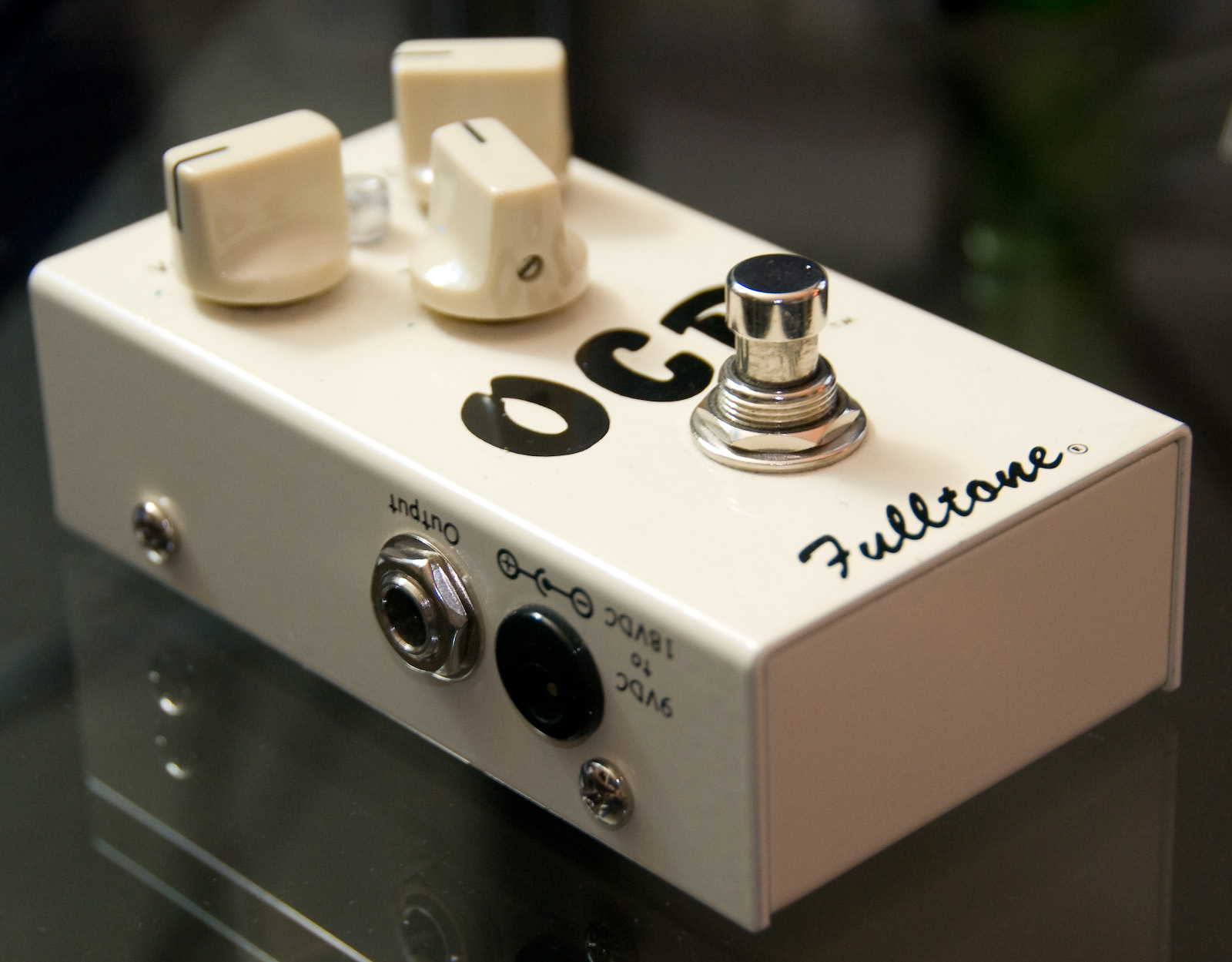
The Fulltone OCD

In 2004, Fulltone released the Obsessive Compulsive Drive (OCD), a hard-clipping, op amp-based overdrive that took design cues from both the Tube Screamer-based Voodoo Labs Overdrive and the MXR Distortion +, with an "open" sound and enough headroom to mimic a driven tube amp. Dubbed by Music Radar a "game-changing" design, the OCD further established Fulltone's prominence in the boutique market while gaining fans like Billy Gibbons, Paul Gilbert, Eric Johnson, Peter Frampton, and Don Felder.

The OCD has gone through multiple iterations, with changes from versions 1.1 to 1.7 being generally subtle alterations of the pedal's EQ response. Version 2 brought more noticeable changes, with a new output buffer and JFET transistor input stage, and the option to use a new type of switching, enhanced bypass, instead of true bypass. After the first iteration, the drive pot's value was also increased for a more "dramatic" distortion, while an asymmetric germanium diode was later added to shift the character of the clipping. All versions of the OCD feature an HP/LP toggle switch, which stands for "high-peak/low-peak" but is often incorrectly thought to mean "high-pass/low-pass." HP mode adds distortion and presence, as well as a more pointed midrange, while LP mode maintains the amp's character.

=== Hermida Audio Zendrive ===
Alfonso Hermida was an aerospace engineer with NASA in 1998—with a side job repairing effects pedals—when he first heard Robben Ford's rendition of "Golden Slumbers." Inspired to capture the tone he heard, Hermida spent years working on pedal designs, only later finding out about Ford and his association with Dumble amps. In 2003, Hermida sent Ford his first finalized design, the Mosferatu, but it had more gain than Ford required. The amount featured in "Golden Slumbers," which the Mosferatu replicated, was atypical for Ford. Hermida returned to an earlier attempt at capturing Ford's tone, a design with less gain and a greater focus on dynamics—the Zendrive—and sent it to him. The pedal initially had three knobs, with Hermida later adding a fourth, "Voice," which altered the gain and bass response in tandem.

Hermida officially released his Zendrive in 2004. Premier Guitar praised the pedal for achieving the "smoother-than-smooth, violin-like lead tones" characteristic of Ford's amp of choice, the Dumble Overdrive Special, a famously expensive and exclusive amplifier. The Zendrive would reach similar status, with the pedal being made in limited quantities and used prices reaching over a thousand dollars. Hermida also produced the Zendrive 2, which incorporated a 12AX7 tube into the circuit. Robben Ford himself is known to use a Zendrive with a clean Fender Twin. Struggling to keep up with demand, Hermida partnered with the company Lovepedal in 2013 to take over Zendrive manufacturing.

=== Ibanez Tube Screamer ===
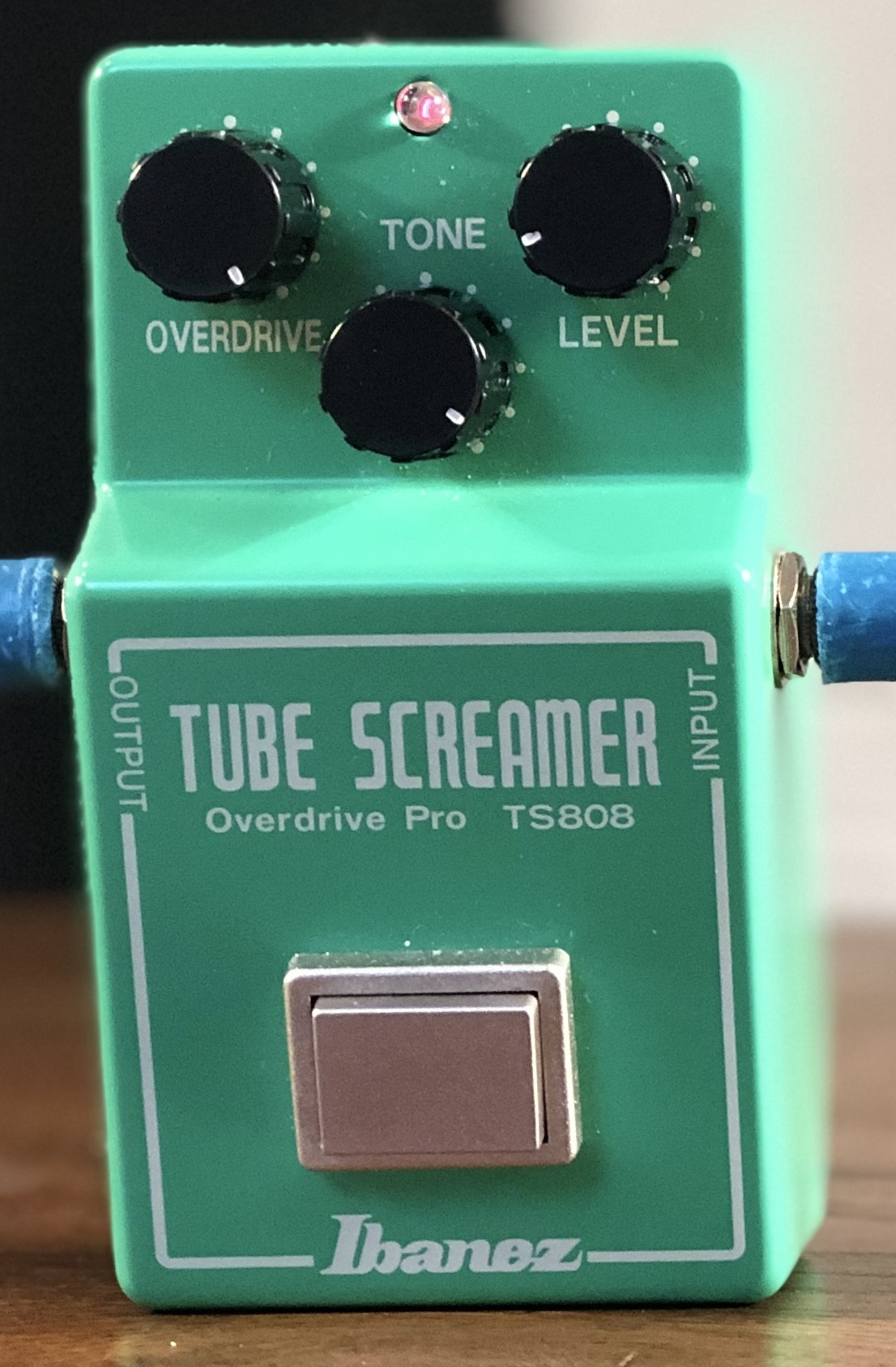
Ibanez TS-808 Tube Screamer

By the late 1970s, Ibanez—mostly known for producing Fender, Gibson, and Rickenbacker copies—wished to start producing overdrive pedals to compete with the Boss OD-1. The task was given to manufacturer Nisshin (which sold products under the brand name Maxon) and designer Susumu Tamura. The design of the early TS-808 Tube Screamer was nearly identical to the OD-1, but relied on symmetrical clipping to avoid Boss' patent on solid-state asymmetrical clipping, while adding a tone control. Multiple iterations of the Tube Screamer followed, most notably the TS9, which replaced the TS-808 in 1982. Tube Screamers are characterized by a smooth distortion, with a strong increase in midrange frequencies and a cut in bass. This more focused tone became popular with guitarists across multiple genres and has been used by many to create their signature sound. According to Premier Guitar, given the Tube Screamer's enduring popularity and influence, "no single pedal has had a greater impact on musical expression or played as important a role in the development of effects modification."

=== Klon Centaur ===
The Klon Centaur, made by American engineer Bill Finnegan, was released in 1994 with the aim of recreating the harmonically rich distortion of an amplifier at a high volume. Finnegan wanted a "big, open" sound, with a "hint of tube clipping," that would not sound like a pedal was being used. He was quickly overwhelmed with orders, each taking 12–14 weeks, as Finnegan handmade the pedals himself. Deciding the profit margin was not sustainable, Finnegan discontinued the original Centaur in 2008, having produced 8,000 units. He later contracted out the manufacturing of a revised design, the Klon KTR. By 2019, used Centaurs sold for between $1,900 and US$2,500. According to Guitar.com, which named the Centaur one of the industry's greatest effect pedals, "The Klon Centaur is either the greatest, most useful overdrive ever made, or the worst example of guitarists losing all sense of perspective about how much good tone should cost."

The Klon Centaur has been used by guitarists including Jeff Beck, John Mayer, Joe Perry (of Aerosmith), Nels Cline (of Wilco), Matt Schofield, and Ed O'Brien (of Radiohead).

=== Marshall Bluesbreaker ===
Launched in 1991 alongside the Drivemaster and Shredmaster, the Bluesbreaker overdrive was Marshall's attempt at recreating the tone of Marshall's own 1962 "Bluesbreaker" combo, nicknamed for its use by Eric Clapton when he played with John Mayall & The Bluesbreakers. The pedal came in a large, black, wedge-shaped case with a raised section that protected its three controls, for Gain, Tone, and Volume. While exceeding at adding subtle, transparent grit to an amp, the pedal failed to capture the tone of its namesake amp and was not a success during its limited initial production run. Guitar.com later stated the pedal was a prime example of something "that came out wrong and ended up being brilliant anyway". The pedal's lack of recognition changed years later when John Mayer started using a Bluesbreaker on his pedalboard, reigniting industry interest in it. Many pedal-makers have since developed modified versions of the original circuit, most notably Analog.Man's King of Tone. In 2023, Marshall reissued the Bluesbreaker, Drivermaster, and Shredmaster, as well as the earlier Guv'nor, as part of their Vintage Reissue series.

=== Marshall The Guv'nor ===
Released in 1988, the Guv'nor was Marshall's first overdrive pedal. It was intended to recreate the sound of an overdriven JCM-style amp in pedal format using solid-state circuitry, and as such it has been credited as the first "amp-in-a-box" overdrive, or more specifically the first "Marshall-in-a-box" (MIAB) overdrive. The Guv'nor circuit is relatively simple, using hard-clipping after a dual op-amp, similar to the MXR Distortion +, but with red LEDs instead of diodes. The Guv'nor uses a large, black enclosure with red, decorative pinstripes; it has a sloping front and its controls—including a unique, amplifier-style three-band EQ—are angled away from the footswitch. The pedal also features a rarity for an overdrive pedal: an effects loop (via a Y-insert), which allows a second pedal to be connected and activated at the same time—e.g., using the Guv'nor paired with a delay effect for solos. Notable players include Gary Moore, with the pedal visible in artwork for his album Still Got the Blues.

The Guv'nor was discontinued in 1991 to make way for the launch of the Bluesbreaker, Shredmaster, and Drivemaster, the latter of which features a revised Guv'nor circuit in new housing and without the effects loop. Music Radar characterized the Guv'nor and Drivemaster as having a "strong JCM vibe, with low-gain crunch all the way through to gnarlier NWOBHM-friendly gain." The Drivemaster had fans like Jeff Buckley and Dan Hawkins. Long after leaving the market, the Guv'nor became popular with boutique pedal makers, with the circuit forming the basis of a wave of successful MIABs like the JHS Angry Charlie. Guitar.com noted in a retrospective, however, that compared to the accuracy of its modern competitors, the Guv'nor feels less like a true MIAB and more like a conventional overdrive with a Marshall-esque accent.

Marshall relaunched the Guv'nor in 2023 as part of its Vintage Reissue series, which sought to take advantage of the four short-lived pedals having become collector's items.

=== MXR Micro Amp ===
The M133 Micro Amp was released by MXR in 1978 and since then it has become perhaps the most commonly used "boost" pedal on the market, intended to add volume or distortion (depending on where it is placed in the signal chain) without coloring the underlying tone. The Micro Amp is simple, an op-amp design offering 26 dB of signal boost with a single control for volume in a small, milk-white case with black text. Premier Guitar described it as "reliable, solid, predictable, and dirt-cheap," and dubbed it the "Toyota Corolla" of the pedal industry. While intended to act as a "transparent" boost, fans and critics have both observed that the Micro Amp slightly brightens the affected tone. Jack White is a prominent fan of the pedal, using them since The White Stripes, as is John Frusciante of The Red Hot Chili Peppers. In 2014, MXR released a "+" version of the Micro Amp, adding treble and bass controls to the original design.

=== Nobels ODR-1 ===
The ODR-1 was created for the German brand Nobels by Kai Tachibana, who was dissatisfied with the strong increase in midrange frequencies and decrease in bass common in other overdrive pedals. Tachibana had initially trained as a radio and television technician, but gained experience repairing amplifiers and effects pedals while working at an electronics repair shop. Sometimes referred to as "the other green overdrive," the ODR-1 offers a fuller sound that has made it a favorite pedal for Nashville session players like Tom Bukovac and Tim Pierce. Besides its more balanced EQ curve, the ODR-1 eschewed the conventional tone knob, which cuts or boosts treble frequencies, for a dual-filter "Spectrum" control that simultaneously boosts/cuts both highs and lower-mids as the knob is turned. Later editions of the pedal have featured the ability to cut bass frequencies, as the low end is sometimes considered too prominent for humbucker players. This includes the ODR-1 BC, which attenuates bass frequencies via a DIP switch in the battery compartment and was released in 2020 alongside a "mini" format version of the original ODR. Five years later, Nobels released the ODR-1X and ODR-mini2, updating the previous iterations with dedicated controls for adjusting the low end. The ODR-1X also includes a gain boost button that shifts the gain control into a higher range and can be turned on or off with an external footswitch.

Tachibana left Nobels in 2019 to found Nordland, through which he releases his own ODR-1-style pedals.

=== Paul Cochrane Timmy ===
Paul Cochrane first produced the Tim overdrive in the late 1990s. One of the first boutique overdrive pedals, it became popular for its open, uncompressed tone with expanded EQ options, which consisted of pre-gain bass and post-gain treble controls, alongside controls for volume and gain. The pedal was quite large, however, and many players did not use the pedal's boost circuit or effects loop, so in 2004 Cochrane released a smaller, simplified option, the Timmy. This new pedal maintained the original Tim's four-control layout alongside a toggle switch that allowed users to change its clipping and compression, but removed the Tim's other features. The Timmy quickly surpassed its larger sibling in popularity as an early example of a "transparent" overdrive, with Guitar World writing that it had "more dynamic presence than your regular overdrive" and that it blended in seamlessly with an overdriven amplifier. The magazine places the Timmy in the Tube Screamer "family tree", but noted it does not have the Tube Screamer's characteristic mid-hump and is less compressed at lower gain levels. In the boutique market, the Timmy's transparent character and four-knob control layout has been widely copied. Despite the pedal's success, Cochrane has continued to build the pedals himself and sells them at a reasonable price-point; Cochrane additionally assists the DIY community in creating Timmy-style pedals. In 2020, Cochrane partnered with MXR to release a smaller format, mass-produced version of the Timmy.

=== Way Huge Red Llama ===
Jeorge Tripps launched his company Way Huge in 1992 with his first pedal, the RL2 Red Llama Overdrive, a reworking of a fuzz circuit DIY project published in a 1977 edition of Guitar Player. One of the first production model boutique overdrive pedals, the original Red Llama became known for a core tone reminiscent of an overdriven Fender "tweed" amplifier that extended into fuzz-like territory with a biting top end when pushed hard. The pedal came in a pinkish-red, brushed aluminum case, with only volume and drive controls and top-mounted input and output jacks. Way Huge closed in 1999 when Tripps was hired by Line 6, causing significant price increases on the used market for the brand's pedals. As Director of Product Development for Dunlop, Tripps revived his brand in 2009 and began releasing new pedals, with a MKII version of the Red Llama appearing in 2012. A 25th anniversary version was released five years later with the addition of a "Hi Cut" control, while a MKIII model was released by Way Huge in 2022, returning the design to its two-knob format and using the brand's "Smalls" compact enclosure style. Premier Guitar noted that even three decades after its debut, and with many more companies producing overdrive pedals, the Red Llama sound remained surprisingly distinct.

== See also ==
- Boss' notable pedals
- Treble booster
