= EarthQuaker Devices =

Audio effects manufacturer

EarthQuaker Devices (EQD) is an effects pedal manufacturer located in Akron, Ohio that was founded by Jamie Stillman in 2004. EarthQuaker is part of the boutique guitar pedal industry.

== History ==
EarthQuaker Devices was started in founder Jamie Stillman's basement in West Akron, Ohio in 2004. By 2019, the company grew to employ 50 people and operates out of a 15,000-square-foot building on Bowery Street. Stillman famously started building pedals by attempting to make a clone of the Fuzz Face guitar effects pedal 50 times before he was satisfied. According to Stillman, the pedal-making-business was "just a hobby that went awry and turned into a pretty big global business".

In 2019, EarthQuaker Devices was recognized by the U.S. Small Business Administration as the Small Business Exporter of the Year. At the time of the award, EarthQuaker distributed their products to 47 countries while producing all devices at the Akron, Ohio facility.

== Activism and advocacy ==
In July 2020 the company ceased their sponsorship of the Akron Art Museum concert series, a relationship that had lasted several years. CEO Julie Robbins explained the decision by saying that "I have been following the situation ... regarding the complaints of former employees [about] racist behavior, sexual harassment, discrimination, and toxic work environment at the Akron Art Museum".
