= Dunlop Manufacturing =

American manufacturer of musical accessories

Dunlop Manufacturing, Inc
- Company type: Private
- Industry: Consumer electronics
- Founded: 1965
- Founder: Jim Dunlop
- Headquarters: Benicia, California
- Subsidiaries: MXR
- Website: http://www.jimdunlop.com

Dunlop Manufacturing, Inc. is a manufacturer of musical accessories, especially effects units, based in Benicia, California, United States. Founded in 1965 by Jim Dunlop Sr., the company grew from a small home operation to a large manufacturer of music gear. Dunlop has acquired several well-known effects pedal brands, including Cry Baby, MXR and Way Huge. Its current CEO is Jim Dunlop Sr's son Jimmy "Jimi" Dunlop.

== Background and history ==
Scottish immigrant Jim Dunlop founded the Jim Dunlop Company in 1965 as a part-time business while working as a processing and chemical engineer at Barr and Stroud in Glasgow. He was an apprentice of the creator of the first hip replacement, William "Bill" Wallace. His first product was the Vibra-Tuner, a small device that attached to a guitar with a suction cup and displayed whether the guitar was in tune with the vibration of a small reed.

While visiting music stores to sell his new product, someone told him that musicians needed a good capo, remarking that anyone who made a good capo that could handle a 12-string guitar would make a lot of money. Using his engineering background, Dunlop created the toggle capo, and then worked with a local machine shop to build the first capo dies, manufacturing what eventually became the long running "1100 series" capo.

Starting from his living room, Dunlop later moved construction to his garage, and then to a location outside the house.

On March 19, 1972, he moved into the pick market, after reading every issue of Guitar Player magazine and noting musicians’ comments concerning what they liked and did not like about picks. He made his first picks from nylon, and although Jim Dunlop, Sr. is no longer alive, the Dunlop Manufacturing company continues to produce these, among many other types.

Also in 1972, Dunlop left his job at Dymo Industries to focus on his own company full-time. He moved his family to Benicia, California and set up shop in Benicia Industrial Park. A few years later, he outgrew that building and moved to Industrial Way.

Dunlop products now range from capos and picks to slides, strings, fret wire, strap retainers, and a variety of electronic effects, including the original Cry Baby wah-wah pedal, the Uni-Vibe phaser, Heil Talk Box, and the MXR and Way Huge lines of stompboxes.

Dunlop Manufacturing founder Jim Dunlop Sr died on February 6, 2019, at the age of 82.

== Way Huge Electronics ==
Jeorge Tripps launched Way Huge in 1992. In late 1999 the company closed its doors when Tripps went to work for Line 6. In 2008, Tripps and the company moved to Dunlop Manufacturing and resurrected the Way Huge line, including the Swollen Pickle (a fuzz), Pork Loin (an overdrive), Fat Sandwich (a distortion), and Green Rhino (another overdrive). They have also recently reissued the much sought after and often cloned Red Llama overdrive, notable for its volume boost and gain past 2 o'clock which results in a sound that is very distorted and has considerable mid-range presence. Way Huge has also collaborated with Joe Bonamassa on various drive pedals including the 'Penny Saver Royale' and the 'Overrated Special'.

== Tortex ==
Introduced in 1981, Tortex is the company's brand name for an acetal based line of plectra. The overall feeling of the picks is meant to mimic the feeling of vintage tortoise shell picks (as genuine tortoise shell picks have been banned since 1973).
