= Tung-Sol =

American electronics manufacturer

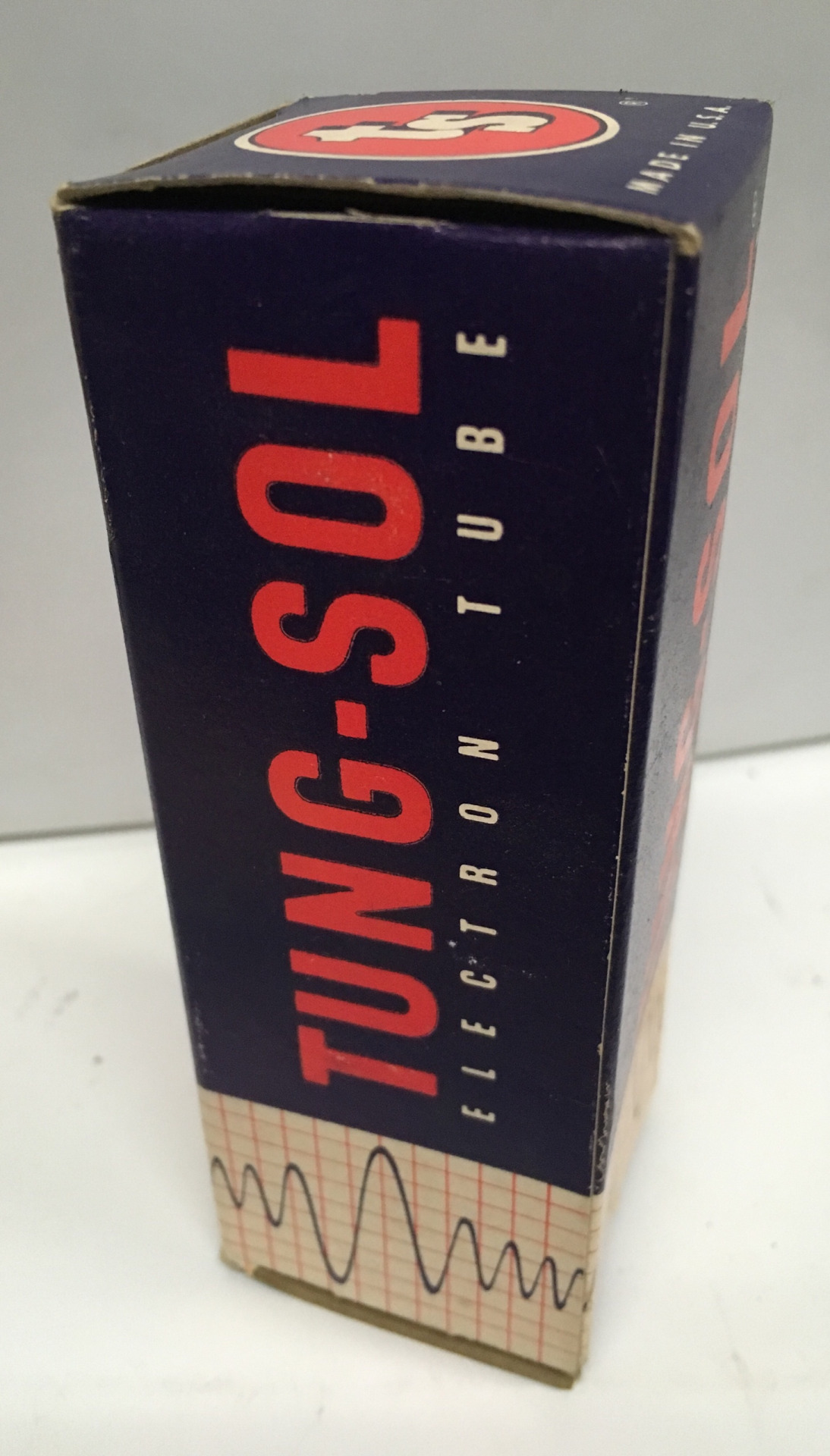
Tung-Sol vacuum tube carton with the 'waveform' design, used until the 1960s

Tung-Sol was an American manufacturer of electronics, mainly lamps and vacuum tubes.

== History ==
In 1904, the company started as a small business in New York City, with Harvey Wilson Harper and two brothers, Herbert E. and Herbert C. Plass. The Plass brothers operated the Howard Electric Novelty Company at the time in New York City. Harper had received a patent in 1904 for a "Machine for Making Incandescent-Electric-Lamp Bulbs," for a machine improving the production of bulbs. The company invented electric lights for Christmas trees as well as production of 2-inch 2-rail toy train model equipment between 1904 and 1906. In 1911, the company stopped its production of the trains in order to concentrate on bulbs and radio tubes productions.

=== Lamp experience and beginnings ===
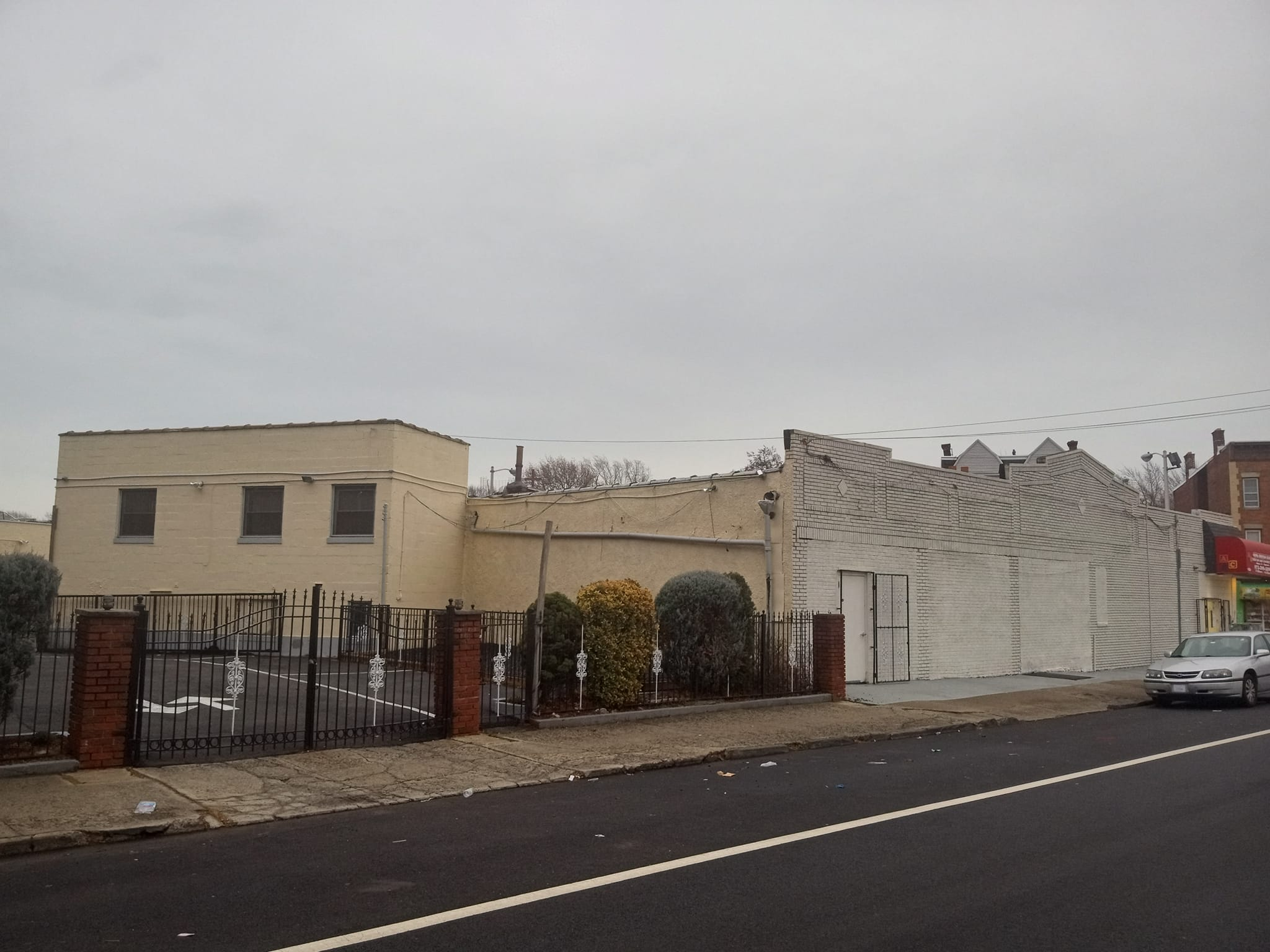
Howard Miniature Lamp Company former location at Springfield Ave and South 19th Street, Newark, NJ after moving from East Orange in 1915

Harper had worked since 1897 with miniature lamps. By 1900 he worked at General Electric as head of the miniature lamp department. In 1907, the Howard Miniature Lamp Company moved to 327 Academy Street in Newark, New Jersey then in 1914, relocated to East Orange, New Jersey on 338 Main Street. Their production of automobile headlight incandescent bulbs were replacements for oil and gas lighting system on automobiles. The company relocated in 1915 to Springfield Avenue and 19th Street in East Orange. Harper sold this company to General Electric in 1916 to avoid patent infringement. In 1917, the Howard Incandescent Lamp Corporation was incorporated and operated at 95 8th Avenue in Newark, New Jersey. The founder was Harvey W. Harper. Their early products were mainly geared towards the automotive market and included headlamps, pilot lights, and flashlight bulbs. Tung-Sol Lamp Works was licensed to produce lamps in tungsten-filament from General Electric through royalty-free rights for their patent. Tung-Sols' license was a B license allowing only paying a quota and percentage of production for large or small bulb manufacturing to General Electric without exports of goods. Tung-Sol Lamp Works made miniature lamps under this system with another miniature maker called Chicago Miniature Lamp Company. Another company called the Consolidated Electric Lamp Company made large lamps under the B license agreement. These three companies were in production in 1925 with the last B licenses as General Electric no longer issued them from 1917 to 1925. Only Westinghouse had the A type license at this time, to make large and small lamps with the rights to use the patent that General Electric had on the tungsten filament type lamps.

=== Company incorporation tube expansion ===
In 1920, there was a picture of the Miniature Incandescent Lamp Factory with boys sitting on the steps held in the Newark Public Library. https://archive.org/details/Immerso5_0018 In 1924, the Tung-Sol Lamp Works was incorporated with an electric bulb with a tungsten filament product. The trade name was formed from the first syllable of "tungsten" and the Latin word "sol" meaning sun. The new company had Harvey Harper as president and tinkered with radio tubes at Newark's 8th Avenue factory. On April 8, 1930, the company (Tung-Sol Radio Tubes Inc) was listed in the Wall Street Journal in their "Broad Street Gossip" column as an RCA licensee. In 1935, Clyde C. Bohner was vice-president in Charge of Engineering and discussed information on radio tubes with a company magazine sold to the public, such as an article, titled, "How to Get the Best That's on the Air at Home and Abroad." In 1939, the company still produced miniature dial lamps as the screw or bayonet type with different volts, amps, candle power, bead color, and bulb type dimensions or specifications. In 1941, radio tubes continued being sold to radio broadcast stations as R. E. Carlson was vice-president in Charge of Sales during this time. Circa 1948, there was a picture of the Tung-Sol Factory at the corner of High Street and Eighth Avenue by Thomas Pallante located in the Newark Public Library. https://archive.org/details/Immerso5_0037 The location of the factory was in the First Ward of Newark and employed up to 600 people, half of them from this Italian neighborhood. Several sales offices were in the United States.

=== Expansion in the 1920s-1940s ===
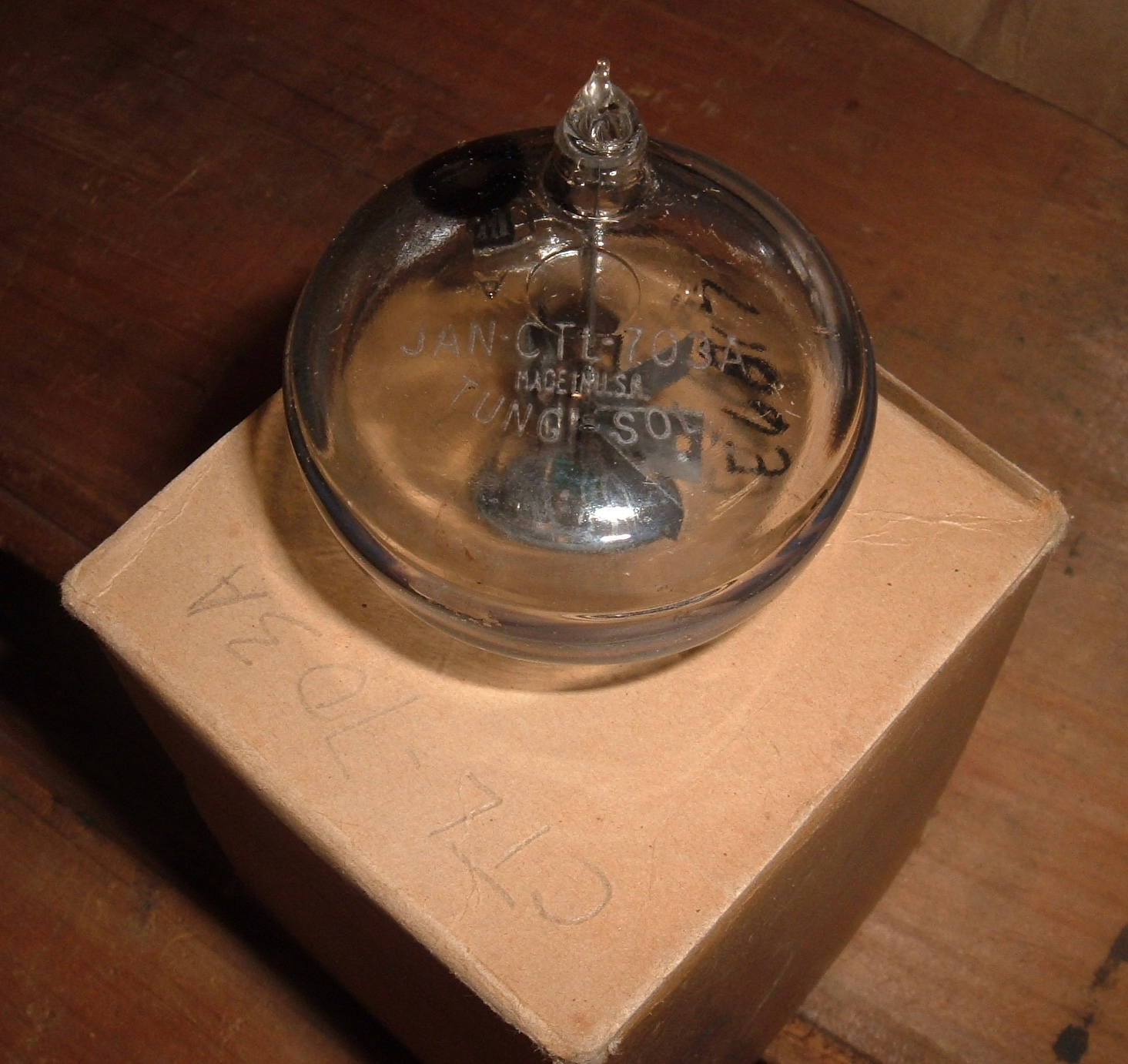
Tung-Sol Joint-Army-Navy (JAN) CTL 703A Ultra High Frequency Triode "doorknob" vacuum Tube, from 1943 copyright design

The company entered the electronics field in the 1920s. We can determine from an advertisement in Dry Goods Economist, dated June 1, 1920, that Tung-Sol had jobbers responsible for selling lamps, without inventories, filing of reports, warehouse distribution and turning a profit for the merchant selling to a customer. One such jobber was the Independent Light and Wire Inc at 1737 Broadway in New York City, that handled Tung-Sol lamps for merchants and then could sell the lamps to customers. In June 1926, three adjoining property buildings located at 111-117 High Street near the 8th Street plant was purchased for expansion. In time they established themselves as leaders in the development and production of vacuum tubes, with their main competition including RCA and Sylvania. In fact, Tung-Sol had published the "Around the World with Tung-Sol World Radio Log" in 1935 as a sort of radio guide with information on domestic, international stations and articles with charts and tables. It also promoted the company for servicing of radios with its tubes, especially, "The Tung-Sol serviceman is no further than your telephone" motto. Lamp Works made an announcement to stockholders on October 14, 1935, for increased capital. The approved increase was 210,000 shares of no-par preferred stock, with 80 cents cumulative dividends a share, and $1-par value common stock at 500,000 shares. In 1941, many United States broadcast stations were using radio tubes by Tung-Sol as evident in literature provided with the broadcasters dial indicators. In 1943, there is a data sheet with copyright on the 703A ultra-high frequency triode vacuum tube used for the Joint-Army-Navy contract NXSR-81414. The Governing Board of the American Institute of Physics approved Tung-Sol Lamp Works as a firm approved by the Board on February 26, 1944. In the Institute of Electrical and Electronics Engineers, there were digests of papers presented at a conference on electron tubes for March 29–30, 1948. Mr. C. Everett Coon of the Tung-Sol Lamp Works, Inc., Bloomfield Electron Tube plant provided citations on the various electron tubes on major industrial applications. An unclassified letter from MIT Lincoln Laboratory of the Office of Naval Research was sent to C. F. (typographical error) Coon on April 21, 1949, by E. S. Rich with subject matter about Life Tests on 5687 Tubes. This correspondence was related to a project that would simulate airplanes in flights using a computer system named Whirlwind 1 that had a memory test computer and a transistor computer. The 5687 tube was a miniature twin triode under brand JAN and military specification number 80C being produced in Bloomfield plant. A JAN brand was Joint-Army-Navy and USN brand was United States Navy for military purposes type over civilian versions.

=== Post-war expansion ===
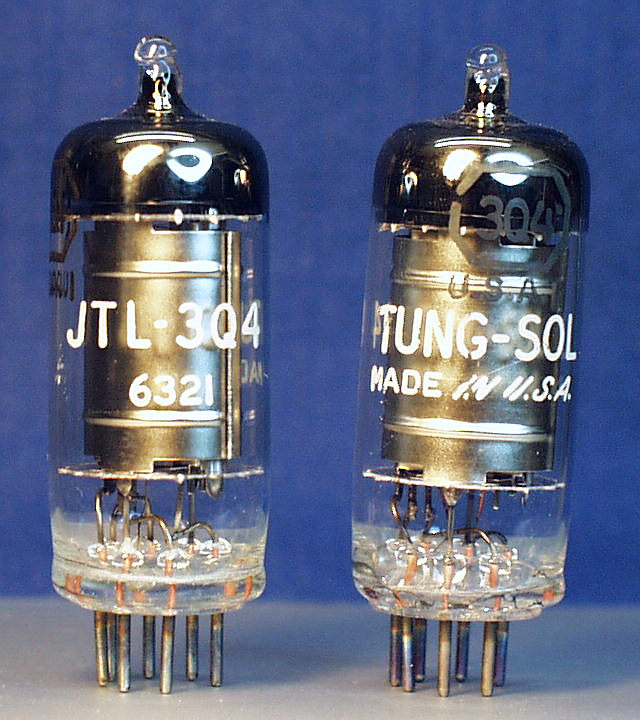
Military Spec MIL-E-1 343 miniature power output pentode type 3Q4 brand JAN, manufactured in Weatherly plant

Between 1941 and 1946, Tung-Sol had undertaken extensive expansion of its plant and equipment in the field of miniature and sealed beam lamps. In 1945 a post-war expansion program allowed a $1 million secured loan, and the company listed another plant in Brooklyn in 1946 for manufacturing and also acquired a Pennsylvania electronic tube plant it was operating under lease agreement for war production. Tung-Sol moved machinery to the acquired plant in Pennsylvania from its Brooklyn and Newark plants that were idle in work due to labor shortage after the war. In 1946, Tung-Sol had about $1,6 million expenditures, by doubling the facilities that were not owned in 1941 and had begun making its own machinery, purchased items from external sources, glass blowing of miniature bulbs, and purchased General Electric and Westinghouse bases.

=== 1950s ===
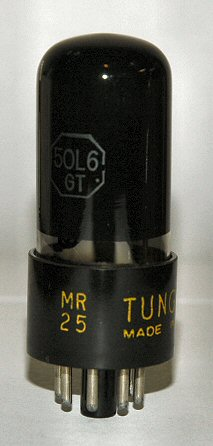
Receiving tube 50L6GT

In 1950, the Pennsylvania plant called Weatherly, had over 1300 employees. By 1951, they began doing business as Tung-Sol Electric Inc. Tung-Sol was also active in the semiconductor industry, with its transistors being easily recognizable by their sky blue color. The Whirlwind I computer at MIT had vacuum tube issues that a visit from Tung-Sols' Mr. E. C. Peet and Remington Rands' Mr. J. J. Lamb visited on December 18, 1951, as a JETEC Task Force to provide short-testing techniques, objectives, and discussions. The Bloomfield plant hired engineers to study circuitry problems involving the use of electron tubes and semiconductor devices; in the applications laboratory. A degree in electrical engineering, electronic engineering or physics was required but considered applicants without experience due to a surge in transistor work. The semiconductor production market increased from four companies in 1951 that made transistors for the commercial market to 15 in 1953. And out of those 15 manufacturers, Tung-Sol was one of eight of the companies making transistors as a major manufacturer of vacuum tubes. In 1953, Tung-Sol Lamp Works, Inc. was listed as a participating member of the Armed Forces Communications Association, an organization needed for national security with employees or officials in electronics to advise and assist with various aspects such as manufacturing or procurement. In October 1953, Tung-Sol was involved with General Electric and Westinghouse in an anti-trust lawsuit with various other lamp manufacturers, due to the practices of General Electric licensing percentages of lamp production from the 30s and 40s. Continued support and assistance from Tung-Sol by C. Everett Coon with knowledge in receiving tubes was needed for the Joint Computer Committee in 1953 where he was chairman of a sub committee between engineers of tube manufacturing companies and design engineers of computer equipment. In 1956, the Hazleton, Pennsylvania building was bought to transfer the automotive flasher unit production from another nearby factory. In the 1950s, the New Jersey locations of Bloomfield and Washington with the Weatherly, Pennsylvania were manufacturing tubes. Another Northern New Jersey location owned by Tung-Sol was called Chatham Electronics, and was a manufacturer of industrial tubes. The Chatham Electronics, Newark, New Jersey subsidiary was listed in the May 11, 1951 Federal Register as contractor for Department of the Army products with contracts: DA-28-043-SC—5422, DA-36-039-SC-6665, DA-36-039—SC-7309, DA-36-039-SC-8411, DA-49-170-SC-21, and NObr 52059. The Weatherly plant produced its 100 millionth vacuum tube unit in 1953, since it began in World War II manufacturing them. A MR stamping on a tube was civilian versions for "maintenance and repair."

=== Electron tube tests ===
In January–February 1953, Tung-Sol described testing procedures for the Electron tube in an issue of SIGNAL, magazine. The advertisement and imagery had a naming as Wham-O. Every electron tube was subjected to a physical "beating" by a machine. A table would have four electron tubes mounted and that machine would provide a tremendous jolt applied by a heavy-duty steel ram smashing the movable table. The significance of having four electron tubes in the test was to simulate the four directions, insuring stability in every direction. The machine was accelerated at 1000 times the pull of gravity. (The pull of gravity is 9.8 meters per second squared and represented 1000 times greater as, 9800 m / s2.) This procedure gave the electron tubes that were mounted this tremendous abuse in attempts of conducting reliable service potential. The test insured the preferred high degree of uniformity specified by the armed services. There were other exact test procedures and inspections for the electron tubes to be mechanically and electronically sturdier in use or greater dependability. objective of theses quality control tests were to have top performing, efficient service life based on longevity, and defer constant maintenance for radio tubes, TV tubes, and special industrial applications devices.

=== 50 years achievements ===
The year 1954 became 50 years since the Howard Electric Novelty Company of New York was founded by Harvey Wilson Harper, Herbert C. and Herbert E. Plass. In May–June 1954, Tung-Sol had advertisement promotions in electronics magazines of its 50 Years Achievements with products and service. In that ad, there were imagery referencing a picture tube; the 5687, 6U8, 5881 tubes; and TS2, TS-21 semiconductor products with the slogan, "Plus-all the technical service that goes with them." 1954 was also the year, a new product line was introduced with transistors. The "DR-1XX" transistor series line was a germanium type transistor and later years produced the power transistors series. Tung-Sol started transistor research in 1953 with engineering samples and delayed introduction as vacuum tube production were large and popular business. This year also marks Tung-Sols interest to increase TV tube output production with new shares of stock being issued for capital. On November 1, 1954, Tung-Sol requested 100,000 Shares of preferred stock at $50 Par in a filing with the Securities and Exchange Commission.

=== Semiconductor expansion ===
In 1953, the starting year for introduction of a transistor line began with engineering samples. Early in 1954, a transistor line was produced with the DR-XXX transistor available with limited tech information. Officially, sometime later Tung-Sol released the DR-150, a 5-watt output device of the germanium type. There is scarce information on the devices application nor circulation use of this series. In 1955, Tung-Sol introduced a round small transistor called the "TS-16X" series. These may have been the first of the "Baby-Blue" exterior colored finish that became identified to Tung-Sol brand association. In 1956, Tung-Sol borrowed $12,000,000 in bank loans to finance expanded inventories. By 1957, the 15 watts of dissipation power transistor types were released, they were models "TS612" and "TS613" and were made for switching circuits as type TO-3 device. Later in early 1957, the "TS614" was introduced in this TO-3 power transistor type. These models were considered Motorola 2N-61X numbering schemes with possible partnership. Tung-Sol began in 1958, to make transistors in transitioning its operations from vacuum tube manufacturing to solid-state components with lacking in mastery process. Tung-Sol was listed in the Computer Directory and Buyer's Guide for June 1958 in the computer industry and as a company for parts, especially the following: Electron tubes, semi-conductors, miniature lamps, diodes, and germanium transistors. In the mid-1950s, the semiconductor manufacturing plant was located on 545 North Arlington Avenue in East Orange, New Jersey. In 1960, Tung-Sol was part of the Electron Tube Information Council, with members from CBS, GE, RCA, Raytheon, Sylvania, and Westinghouse, formed to collaborate on publication of a comparative study between tubes and transistors. Mr. C. Everett Coon was on the committee for Tung-Sol Electric Inc.

In May 1961, there was a Tung-Sol presence in the magazine, Electronic Technician including Service, listing separately Tung-Sol and Chatham Electronics as a manufacturer with both using the newer address of 1 Summer Ave, Newark, New Jersey. The master list directory indicated the manufacturers addresses for technicians to service or search component parts, replacement products, equipment, material and instruments, or technical publications.

=== Sales offices ===
During the early years of radio tubes, Tung-Sol had a practice that allowed dealers to have tubes without paying for them in their inventory and no upfront investment. Upon the dealer selling the tube, they would take their profit on this consignment arrangement and later pay Tung-Sol. There were 8,000 dealers in many neighborhoods throughout the country but there were sales offices located in Atlanta, Boston, Charlotte, Chicago, Dallas, Detroit, Kansas City, Los Angeles, New York City, and the general offices of Newark. The tube prices were advertised as not being higher than what the dealer would pay for recognized brands. Tung-Sol nationally advertised these reputable Tone-flow radio tubes. The dealer needed to qualify and be responsible as a consignment franchise in their neighborhood. The famous motto in print for this program was, "You don't pay until you've sold your tubes."

Tung-Sol used an agency for its advertisements in Signal magazine for May–June 1953. The sales department had designer agency: E.M. Freystadt Associates, Inc. in New York to produce advertisements in Tele-Tech issue of August 1954 with vacuum tube drawings and information. This agency was handling broadcast radio advertisements back in 1941 and can associate with radio tubes and dial indicators. Advertisements in Chilton's Motor Age, listed the sales offices in Atlanta, GA, Columbus, OH, Culver City, CA, Dallas, TX, Denver, CO, Detroit, MI, Irvington, NJ, Melrose Place, IL, Newark, NJ, Philadelphia, PA, Seattle, WA, and Montreal. P.Q., Canada for May 1958.

About June 1959, Neil Uptegrove was appointed manager of advertising and sales promotion for Tung-Sol Electric Inc., according to the July 1959 publication, Electronics World Radio and TV news. In October 1959, the Electronic Sales offices were listed as Newark Home Office, Newark Eastern Region, Melrose Place Central Region, Culver City West Coast Region, Dallas Southwestern Region, and Seattle Pacific Northwest Region represented by Ron Merritt, Company for the manufacturer. About December 1959, Tung-Sol Sales Corp. was a new Canadian division to distribute products throughout Canada as a subsidiary of Tung-Sol Electric. The sales manager of the Canadian division was named, E. Leslie Peter at the time. Between 1954 until 1966, Richard W. Vieser was sales manager up to division manager, started at Chatham Electronics Corporation in Livingston, New Jersey before the acquisition as a subsidiary and then through Tung-Sol.

=== Death of founder ===
The year 1958 was significant for the company when the founder and chairman of the board, Harvey Harper, passed on November 23 at the age of 80 years old. Following the death, Milton R. Schulte was named president and former President Louis Rieben's assumed a position into Chairmanship. Frank J. Ehringer became the automotive products division General Manager.

=== Commerce issues ===
On July 27, 1962, a complaint was brought against Tung-Sol Electric, Inc. and Tung-Sol Sales Corporation from the Federal Trade Commission referencing violations of the Clayton Act. Tung-sol was operating in discounts for jobbers instead of warehouse distributors and favoring discounts for distributors not of the buying group with higher prices over net purchases on automotive flashers. A decision was made on September 12, 1963, in the practices to no longer sell to any purchaser at net prices higher than that net prices charged any other purchaser, who in fact, competed in the resale and distribution of said products with the purchaser paying the higher price. The Commission did not find issues with prices or distribution on miniature lamps or sealed beams lamps because General Electric and Westinghouse were competitors' of such products and automotive flashers lacked that competition.

=== Purolator Products merger and stock devaluation ===
Tung-Sol & Purolator Products, Inc. directors had approved a merger plan in mid year of 1963. Purolator owned approximately 100,000 of Tung-Sol's 926,826 shares and the merger proposal would favor Purolator to issue one share of $100 par, 41/2% cumulative preferred stock (convertible at $85 a share) for each four shares of Tung-Sol common. The corporate merger failed to occur on August 5, 1963, with Purolator and Tung-Sol Inc over issues. Both companies were into automotive product lines with oil filters from Purolator and auto headlights from Tung-Sol; the companies' appeared as compatible businesses for the merger. The announcement by the Purolator president of the merger termination did not reveal the plans with the Tung-Sol shares held and caused the Tung-Sol share price to drop the next business day. Stock fraud was realized as Tung-Sol stock had dropped on that August 6 lower value and Purolator purchased more shares. As Tung-Sol continued dropping throughout August its stock price, Purolator attempted purchasing more stock on September 4 with making a "tender offer" for additional shares. The “tender” offer to Tung-Sol stockholders was to purchase 200,000 shares at $22 per share against the market price of 17.25—a 27.55% premium. Tung-Sol's management indicated the offer was “grossly inadequate in view of Tung-Sol's book value and earnings potential” and “an attempt to purchase effective control of Tung-Sol at a bargain price, even below the previous offer made before merger negotiations were terminated.” A federal court order on September 13, was issued against Purolator and its officers or representatives from acquiring any more of the Tung-Sol stock. Purolator continued with decisions for the tender offer, expiring September 26, and their interest to purchase more stock on September 18, by placing a notice, just a little less than a half page, in The Commercial and Financial Chronicle.

=== Plant closures ===
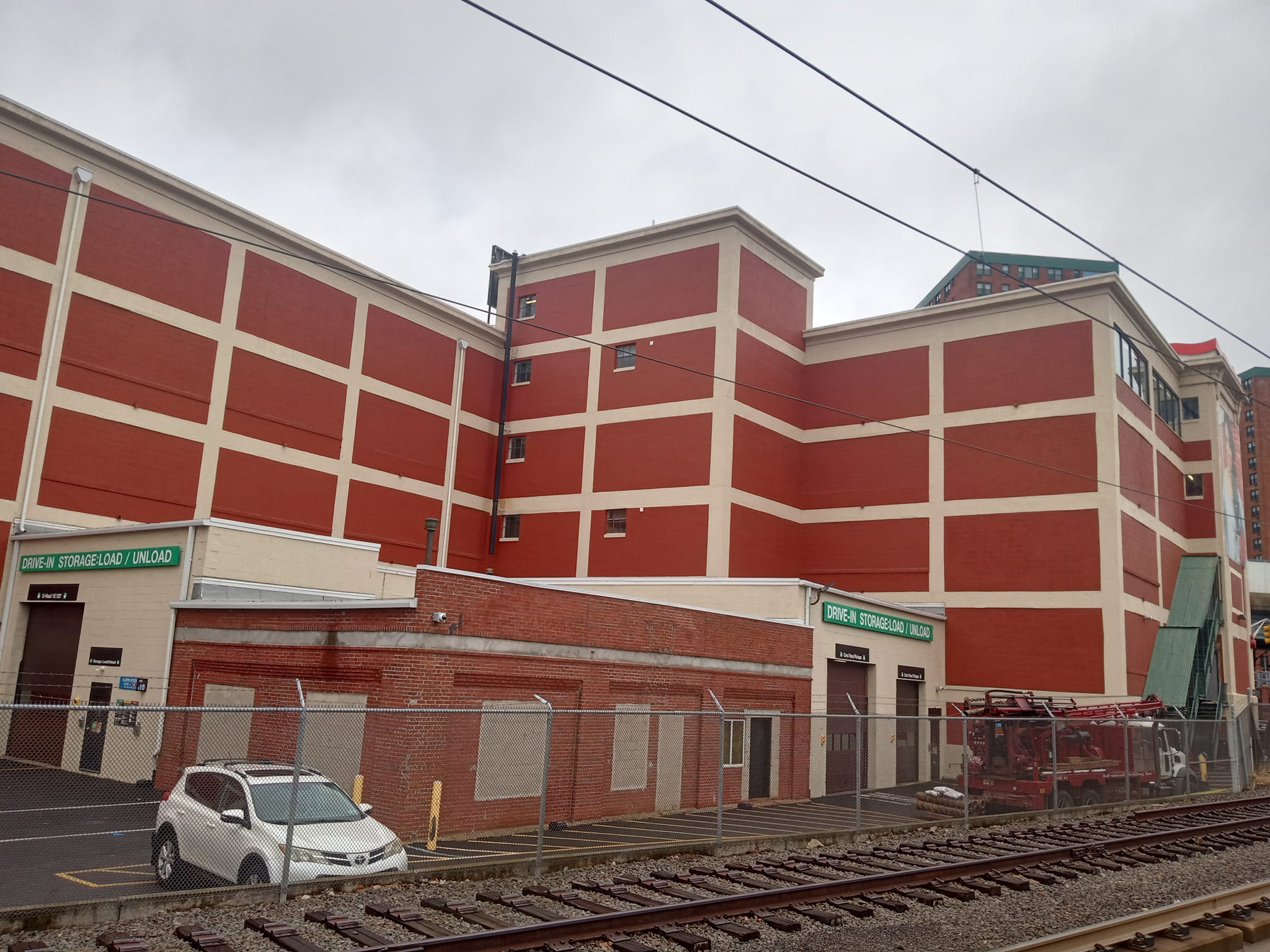
Orange Street plant was occupied from 1935 to 1976 and after a few companies became U-Haul

In 1962, The New York Times published on August 30, 1962, that Tung-Sol Electric, Inc. planned to close a Washington tube plant and transfer operations to Weatherly. About 1962 or 1963, the East Orange transistor plant and cathrode ray operations had closed and caused excess costs towards half-year profits. The Weatherly plant stopped production of tubes on January 1, 1966, and had only 125 employees to continue other products, without deciding a plant closure. Soon after, they were acquired by Wagner Electric, which itself merged into Studebaker-Worthington in 1967. The Orange Street factory continued operation until Wagner Electric sold the property in 1976 ending operations of flashers for directional signals, relays, silicon rectifiers, and power supplies.

=== Tube failures ===
Tung-Sol provided Electron Tubes for the SLAC-71 UC-28, Particle Accelerators and High-Voltage Machines, a report in 1966 identified failures of 25 tubes on the accelerator, covered by warranty, and 60 total tubes on the two-mile accelerator, Mark IV accelerator, and test stands. The machine also had about 28 small trigger thyratrons lost in their operations up to the report findings. Although, they were not all attributed to Tung-Sol, the report conducted that the average life of their tubes had been 1,400 hours on Tung-Sol tubes and about 1,800 hours on I.T.T. tubes. In conclusion, a new production or supply contract for tubes was awarded to Litton Industries in that July to September quarter.

=== Tung-Sol Canada strike ===
In 1964, there was a labor arbitration case brought into the court over improper seniority dates between United Electrical Workers, Local 512, and Tung-Sol of Canada Ltd. during a strike. The case had R. Sharples and Ralph Curie from the union against D. Bellat and R. Mitchell from the Tung-Sol company. Prior to this court case between the bargaining union and company, employees were on strike between September 9, 1963, to September 25, 1963, at the Ontario, Canada plant.

Approximately in 1967, there was a strike over pensions.

There was a third agreement between United Electrical Works, Local 513, and Tung-Sol under Wagner, dated May 26, 1969 to May 23, 1971. It took 25 negotiating sessions and upon the strike deadline to be agreed between the union and the company. Included was a Bramalea Division, The Trades, Class "A"- Warehousing, Plant Maintenance, and Services, Class "B"- Production Equipment, Maintenance, Setup and Tending, Class "C" and Factory Time Workers, Class "E."

The official address of the Canada plant was Tung-Sol International Corporation, 391 Orenda Rd, Brampton, Ontario as indicated in the 1975 Seller's Directory of the Canadian Metals Industry. In that documentation, Tung-Sol was purchasing Stainless Steel rods, bars, and other shapes, Copper Extrusions and other forms, Aluminum in other shapes or forms, Nickel Alloys in other forms or shapes, and Other materials in other forms. The company would perform stamping/blanking/drawing, or welding, and/or surface finishing of the materials.

There was a location in Ontario, Canada that was not listed in many documents in the 50s and 60s. The location was a Tung-Sol plant under Wagner at Bramalea, Ontario. In 1980, a strike occupation occurred at the Tung-Sol plant where workers defiantly sang "O Canada" and "Solidarity Forever." Also, there is a reference to a Quebec location as the workers wrapped themselves in the Quebec flag to the same strike. Significance, was it was referred as a Canadian nationalist strike between "Canadian workers and American bosses."

Circa Tuesday, August 26, 1980, in the Toronto Star. Reported the Brampton, Ontario, Canada plant was built 18 years from this date of upcoming shutdown, reflecting a 1962 existence. The location was on Orenda Road near Steele Avenue.

Thursday, August 28, 1980, reported in the Daily Times, that Wagner would cease October 1, 1980 the Bramalea plant production of sealed beams. However, the employees are receiving severance compensation at significance low amounts as perceived by the employees and community.

Wednesday, September 10, 1980, in the Toronto Star. Striking employees barricaded themselves inside the plant until Tung-Sol negotiated severance pay.

On Friday, September 12, 1980, several employees walked out of the Bramalea plant after accepting a severance pay increase of 600 percent. (Newspaper article published on September 17, 1980, in The Guardian)

The former location is now a warehouse for Polar Pak, A Novolex Brand.

== Wagner Electric operations ==
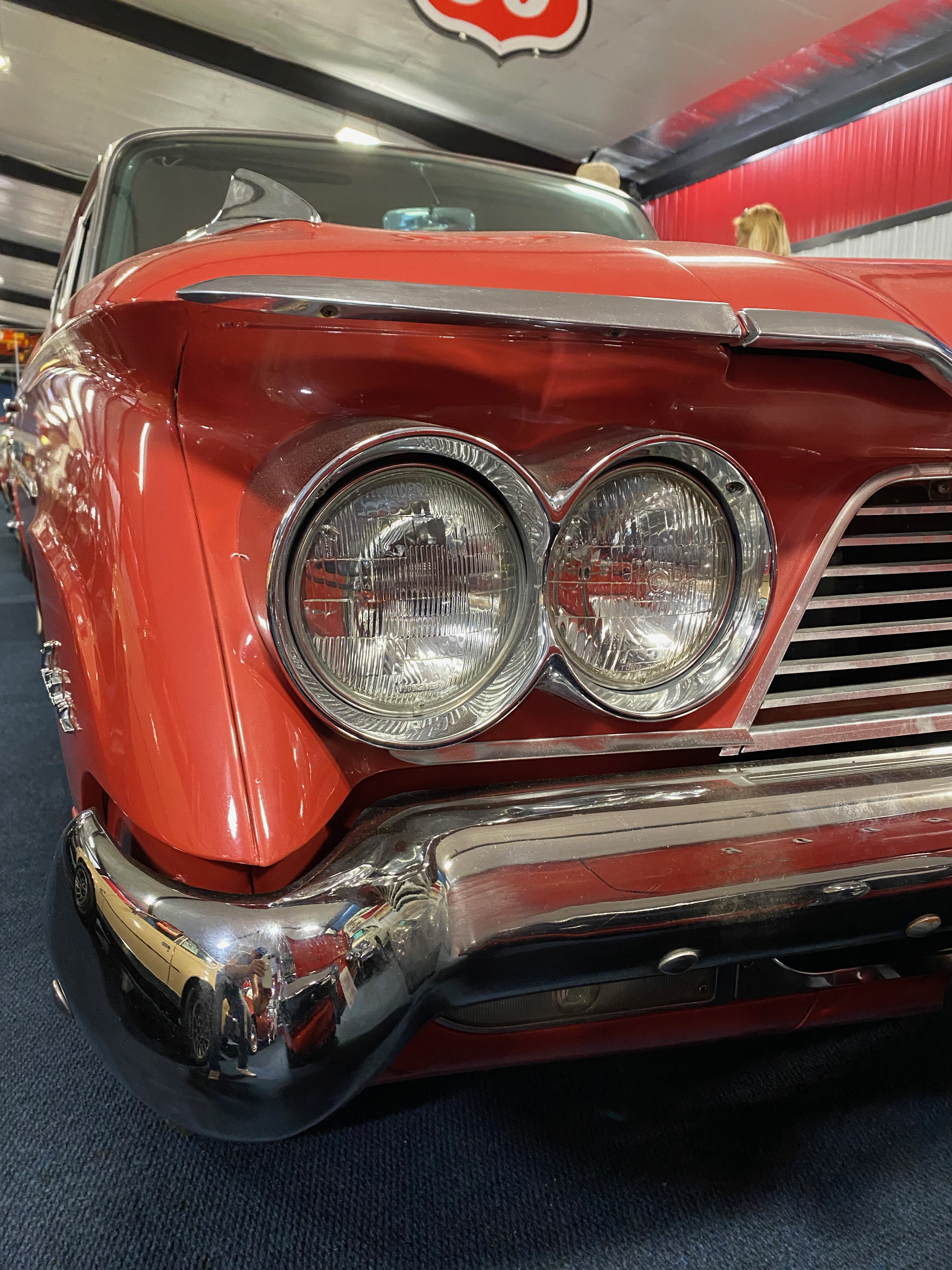
Wagner 5.75' low beam lamp (2 marking) on left (replacement) and Tung-Sol 5.75' high beam lamp on right (original) with logo depressed inside bottom of the lenses, produced 1961–1964, for 1961 AMC Rambler Ambassador sedan

Between 1966 until 1979, Richard W. Vieser held several executive positions from his beginnings with Chatham/Tung-Sul in the mid 50s and mid 60s. He was division general manager from 1966 to 1970; vice president in 1970; group vice president between 1971 through 1973; president 1973 to 1974 and chief executive officer 1974–1979. In April 1973, Wagner Electric Corp., was listed in the Register Planned Emergency Producers with products that could be mobilized for military needs at Boyertown, Hazleton, Newark, Weatherly, and Livingston Tung-Sol Division plant locations. In 1980, a plant was indicated in Canada near Toronto and it was closed by Wagner. This plant was located in Brampton and was part of Wagner Brake and Lighting Products. Although the plant was closed, there were 18 employees in the office and warehouse. The plant, was formerly called Tung-Sol before its sale to the U.S.-based Wagner company then it was owned by McGraw-Edison. There was lacking information about this plant in any advertisements or literature as a Tung-Sol plant from the 1950s or 1960s.

== Studebaker operations ==
In 1967, Studebaker was a part of the existence in Wagner Electrics for a short time. On January 22, plans to merge with Wagner cause both stocks to rise in price and the directors of both companies agreed on March 4 to the merger. A month later to the day, a pact was signed with Wagner Electric for the merger. The Wagner-Studebaker merger was approved by stockholders on May 11. Studebaker quickly agreed to merge with Lee Filter Group on June 14 to add to Wagner's portfolio. On November 28 was when Studebaker merges with Worthington Corporation to form Studebaker-Worthington. In 1976, there were only two locations devoted solely to the assembly of lamps and none devoted to fabrication or other lamp activities. Up to 1979, Studebaker-Worthington was active in a few transactions of buying and selling of companies and assets. On May 24, Richard Vieser, who had been a management fixture for decades at Chatham/Tung-Sol became executive vice president of Studebaker-Worthington. Beginning in July through September, various company interests for the company in acquiring it, but eventually McGraw-Edison offered a tender offer and purchased large percentages of stock.

== McGraw-Edison operations ==
In 1979, an electrical products manufacturer, McGraw-Edison Co., bought Studebaker-Worthington, including its Wagner Division and closed the Hazleton plant. Richard Vieser also was an executive of this Studebaker Worthington company with a role in 1979 as executive vice president followed by executive vice president at McGraw-Edison Company between 1979 and 1984. On September 27, 1979, The New York Times reported McGraw‐Edison named William S. Kingsolver as executive vice president in addition to Vieser.

There was a reference in the Foreign Investment Review Act Quarterly Report, January–March 1982, that had listed Edison International having a branch business of Tung-Sol International Corporation distributing and selling headlights and flashers at Bramalea, Ontario. This is the location of the Canadian strikes under Wagner in 1980.

== Cooper Industries operations ==
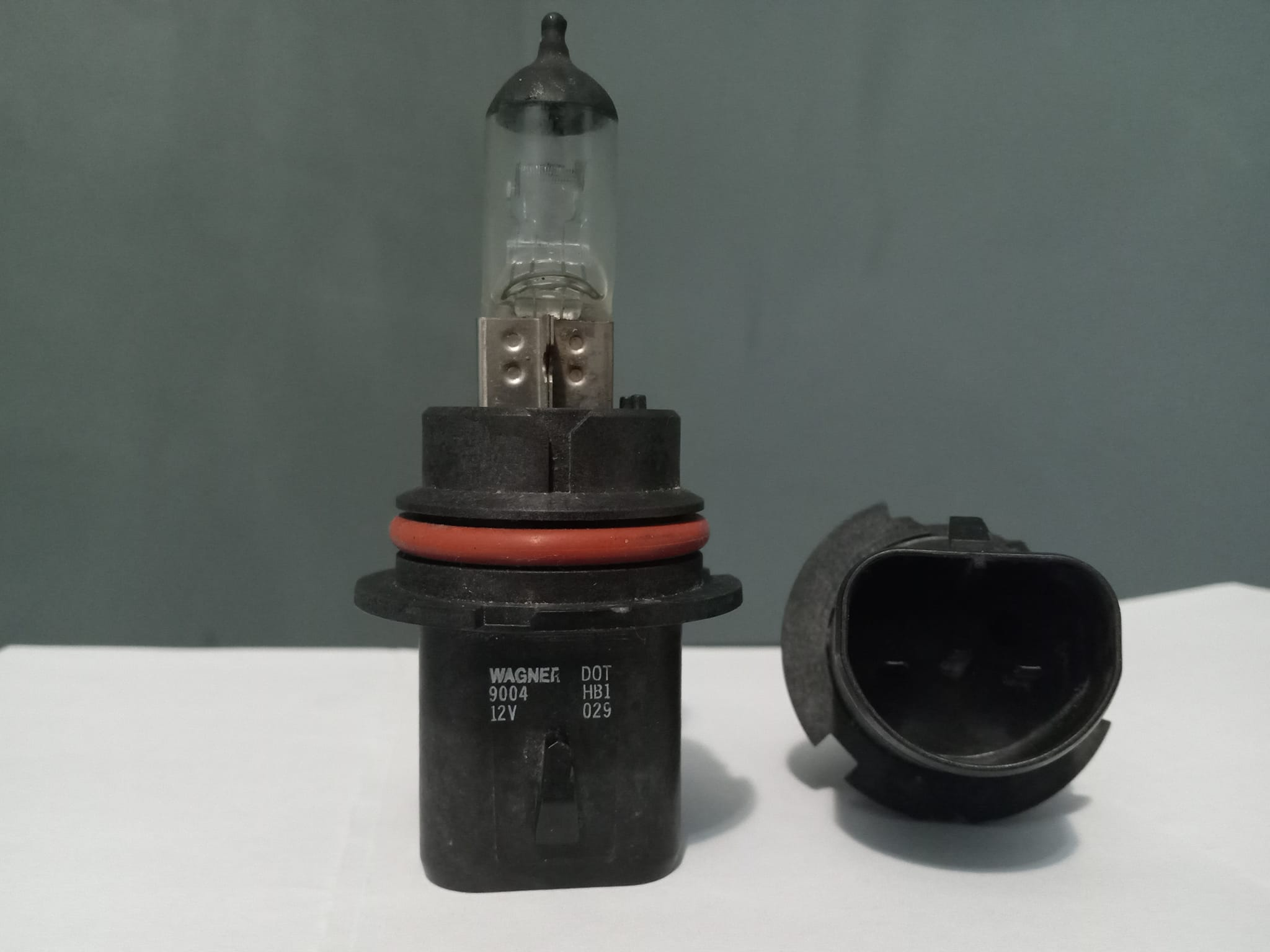
Wagner 9004 high/low beam halogen bulb with plastic housing and three prongs for electrical connector. Made for many cars from mid 80s to late 90s. USA

In May 1985, a worldwide manufacturing company called Cooper Industries, performed a friendly takeover of the former Wagner plants for $1.1 billion, including debt of $300 million. The two Pennsylvania plants, Weatherly and Boyertown, were among nine plants purchased under the Wagner Division and the only two formerly started by Tung-Sol Lamp Works. In the transition from Wagner to Cooper in 1984–1985, Richard Vieser acted as president and chief operating officer. He left for other executive leadership roles in 1985. His past responsibilities in the Chatham/Tung-Sol lead him to Board of Directors for several companies such as Varian Associations (early vacuum tubes, analytical equipment and semiconductor manufacturing equipment), Control Data Corporation, Dresser Industries (a manufacturer of actuators, valves, meters, instruments, regulators, switches), Sybron Corporation, Indresco, and Berg Electronics (board-to-board, wire-to-board, and cable-to-board connectors, sockets, fiber optic interconnects, internal and external cable assemblies.)

== Federal-Mogul operations ==
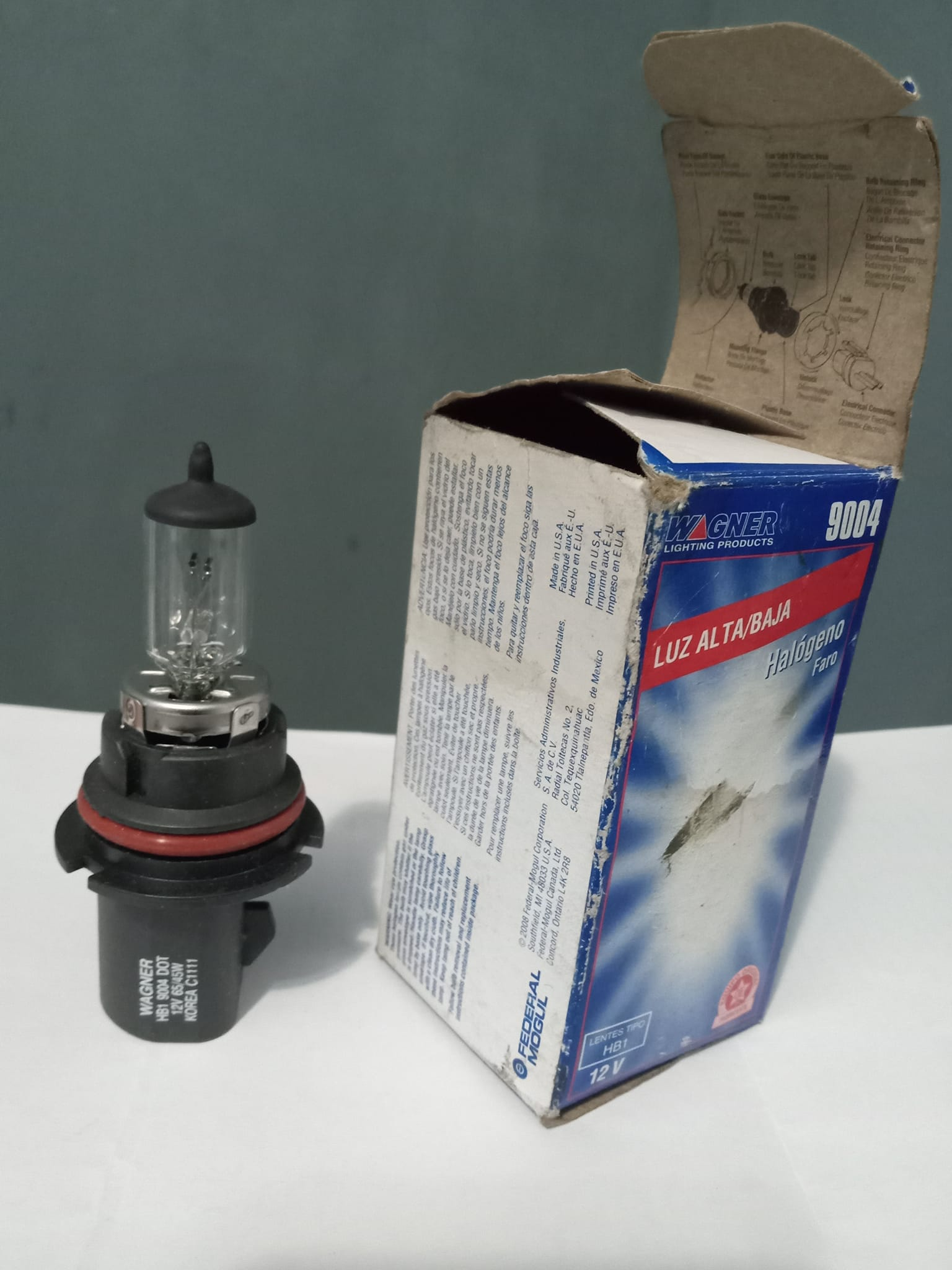
Federal-Mogul #9004 high/low beam halogen bulb with Wagner Lighting Systems packaging. Replacements for vehicles back to 1985 domestic and international makes and a few early 00s. KOREA made with Canada and Mexico listed

In August 1998, Federal-Mogul Corporation purchased Cooper Industries Inc.'s automotive business for $1.9 billion. The corporation planned closure of the Boyertown plant by end of 2010 ending Tung-Sol legacy of manufacturing since 1945.

In 2003, Federal-Mogul planned to shutdown a plant at Copeland Industrial Park in Hampton, Virginia and lay off 260 workers, some were "lamp makers," technicians, and quality-control staff.

The Weatherly Borough took a permit, General Permit for Discharges of Stormwater Associated with Construction Activities, on the Federal-Mogul property on April 9, 2005. There was a Federal-Mogul mailing address for a location in Weatherly as 75 West Main Street and Google maps dated August 2009 revealed vacant land. The Weatherly plant was previously listed as Plane Street which intersects with West Main Street at this address. The Federal-Mogul location was listed as a superfund contaminant site with the U.S. Environmental Protection Agency as the Former Federal-Mogul Site with the address. The Latitude: +40.943701 and Longitude: -75.829941 listed under the EPA ID: PAN000304896 indicated, 75 West Main Street in Weatherly as Borough of Weatherly Municipal Authority and Police Department.

On March 10, 2016, the Weatherly Borough Council was selling some part of the Tung-Sol land for a grocery store development after no historical details on the status of plant closure by Federal-Mogul ownership.

== Manufacturing plants ==
In 1950, tables indicated General Electric production was large in the industry at 53.4% of the sales of domestic miniature incandescent lamps, whereas Tung-Sol was producing at 19.8% of sales.

During the 1950s, there were several locations listed where the products were manufactured in a company catalog.

Facility	Location	Address	Occupancy years	Products	Notes
1	Bloomfield, New Jersey	200 Bloomfield Ave	1946-1971	cathodes	Electron Tube Division, Unknown date when closed, possibly 1971
2	Weatherly, Pennsylvania	Plane Street	1944-1990s/2000s?	tubes for walkie-talkies and bomb sighting mechanisms of airplanes, automotive flasher unit, electronic switches and circuit breakers	Former Read & Lovatt Silk Mill purchased in October, 1944. Closed
3	Newark, New Jersey	370-386 Orange Street	1935-1976	automotive headlamps, signal flashers	Original building built 1915, sold to Tung-Sol in 1935. Newark Public Library image in 1961 Of Tung-Sol Electric Incorporated, 370 Orange Street location. Closed and became a U-Haul rental and storage in the late 2010s
4	Boyertown, Pennsylvania	400 E. Second Street	1945-2010	products	Closed in 2010 under Federal-Mogul Corporation. Purchased in 2010. The 270,000-square-foot building became Berk Wipers International making disposable wiping cloths.
5	Newark, New Jersey	95 8th Avenue	1917-1960s?		Started as Howard Incandescent Lamp Corporation. Closed prior to Interstate 280 was created.

The Weatherly plant had produced the 100 millionth tube on January 23, 1953, from its own assembly line but finally stopped production on January 1, 1966, of tubes.

In January–February 1953, an issue of Signal magazine shows an advertisement from Tung-Sol indicating what products it makes as the following: All Glass Sealed Lamps, Miniature-Lamps, Signal Flashers, Picture Tubes, Radio, TV, and Special Purpose Electron Tubes.

In April 1954, the company known as Gera Mills in Passaic, New Jersey, changed its name to Gera Corporation and ended manufacturing operations by selling its milling machinery and equipment. Their products were woolen and worsted fabrics. In August, there was a stock reversal to limit the amount of shares of Gera Corporation from 1 to 100, increasing value. In November, Chatham Electronics common stock was acquired for $1.5 million in notes and $500,000 in cash to be owned by Gera Corporation. In 1955, there is literature that referenced Chatham Electronics Corporation in Livingston, was a division of Gera Corporation with the introduction of the Model SC-102 scintillation counter used for oil and mineral surveying. The Chatham Electronics Division was purchased from Gera Corporation on May 20, 1957, for purchase price of $15,052,486. At the time of the purchase, its principal products were power and hydrogen thyratron tubes. In 1957, there was a trademark reference in the Index of Trademarks Issued from the United States Patent Office for a new certificate, 642,521, from Gera Corporation to Tung-Sol Electric Inc. The Chatham Electronics Corporation had a location at 475 Washington Street, Newark, New Jersey and was producing tubes mostly of industrial and transmitting variety for Tung-Sol. There was a new factory completed in Livingston, New Jersey for Chatham Electronics that Richard W. Vieser was involved. At this location, it was a division of Tung-Sol producing heavy duty RF, power tubes, and Geiger-counter radiation sensing tubes. The address of this location was 630 West Mount Prospect Avenue in Livingston, New Jersey. On July 1, 1958, Chatham Electronics general office and plant was in Livingston and they were producing electron tubes, aircraft power supplies, radiac devices, electronic equipment, and selenium rectifiers. The sales offices were in Livingston, Culver City, Dallas, and Melrose Park.

In April 1959, Tung-Sol was listed in the Register Planned Emergency Producers as a manufacture that would mobilized for military needs of its plants: Bloomfield, Boyertown, 8th Street Newark, Orange Street Newark, Weatherly, Washington, and Livingston.

There was a decreased demand for tubes in February 1965, that forced the Weatherly plant to lay-off 600 employees and shutdown the remnants of tube production by January 1966.

There is a map of the industries that had located in Bramalea, Ontario, Canada circa 1970. Tung-Sol International Corporation was listed as number 13 out of 54 companies, which also listed Ford Motor Company of Canada and two locations for Northern Electric Company, Limited. A black and white photograph shows the Tung-Sol building, near Steele Avenue farther into the mid-1960s. The area was designed with industrial parks to attract Canadian, American, and British companies and have a residential area.

=== Products ===
In 1935, Tung-Sol was producing radio tubes and servicing radio sets with their tubes. There were several marketing mottos in a company published magazine such as, "The Tung-Sol Serviceman is no further away than your telephone," "A radio is no better than its tubes, retube with Tung-Sol," and "Thrills on the air Tung-Sol gets your share."

Listed in 1953 Electronics magazine, Tung-Sol made all-glass sealed lamps, miniature lamps, signal flashers, picture tubes, radio, TV and special purpose electron tubes, and semiconductor products. In 1955, Tung-Sol published a promotional auto lamp comic book titled, "The light that failed" through One-Shot.

The Weatherly plant manufactured cables for IBM and Xerox after the transitioning from tubes to transistors to other products in the mid-1950s.

The Weatherly plant in 1987, accounted for about $10 million in sales from its operations. The plant assembled 3 million plastic, sealed headlights for automobiles for completion at the Boyertown plant. They built about 2,000 power supplies for airplane builders used to convert electricity for use in aircraft. The manufacturing of hydraulic brake systems parts, especially the power masters and fluid balls used on the brake systems of industrial vehicles.

In 1988, Wagner was working with Chrysler Corporation on plastic headlights for the new, aerodynamically shaped cars, in the automotive marketplace. In September, the Boyertown plant was not scheduled building theses new headlights nor assist in the assembly. The Weatherly plant was in the plans to start building the new headlights and hire 25-35 more people on that project.

== Automotive ==
Tung-Sol developed the first successful car headlight in 1907, followed in 1913 by a single bulb two filament high and low beam headlight. Other Tung-Sol inventions included the flashing turn signal. The turning flasher was branded as the Safety Pilot Indicator which flashed to insure the signal system was working correctly.

Tung-Sol in Canada produced a Left Handed traffic (LH Traffic) sealed beam with a parking light section in the rear. It was branded with a LUCAS supplied or partnership logo in the center.

=== Flashers ===
The April 20, 1954 General Motors Lamps and Lamp Parts Bulletin 8A-100 indicated a list of Tung-Sol signal flashers for direction and warning. Directional flashers operated at 80 to 100 flashes per minute and warning flashers operated at 60 to 80 flashes when 32 or 50 candle power specifications. The 21 and 15 candle power lamps had 80 to 100 flashes depended on voltage to specified lamp. Applications started with the 1939 Buick up to the listed 1954 GM makes with various Ford and Chrysler makes.

=== Lamps ===
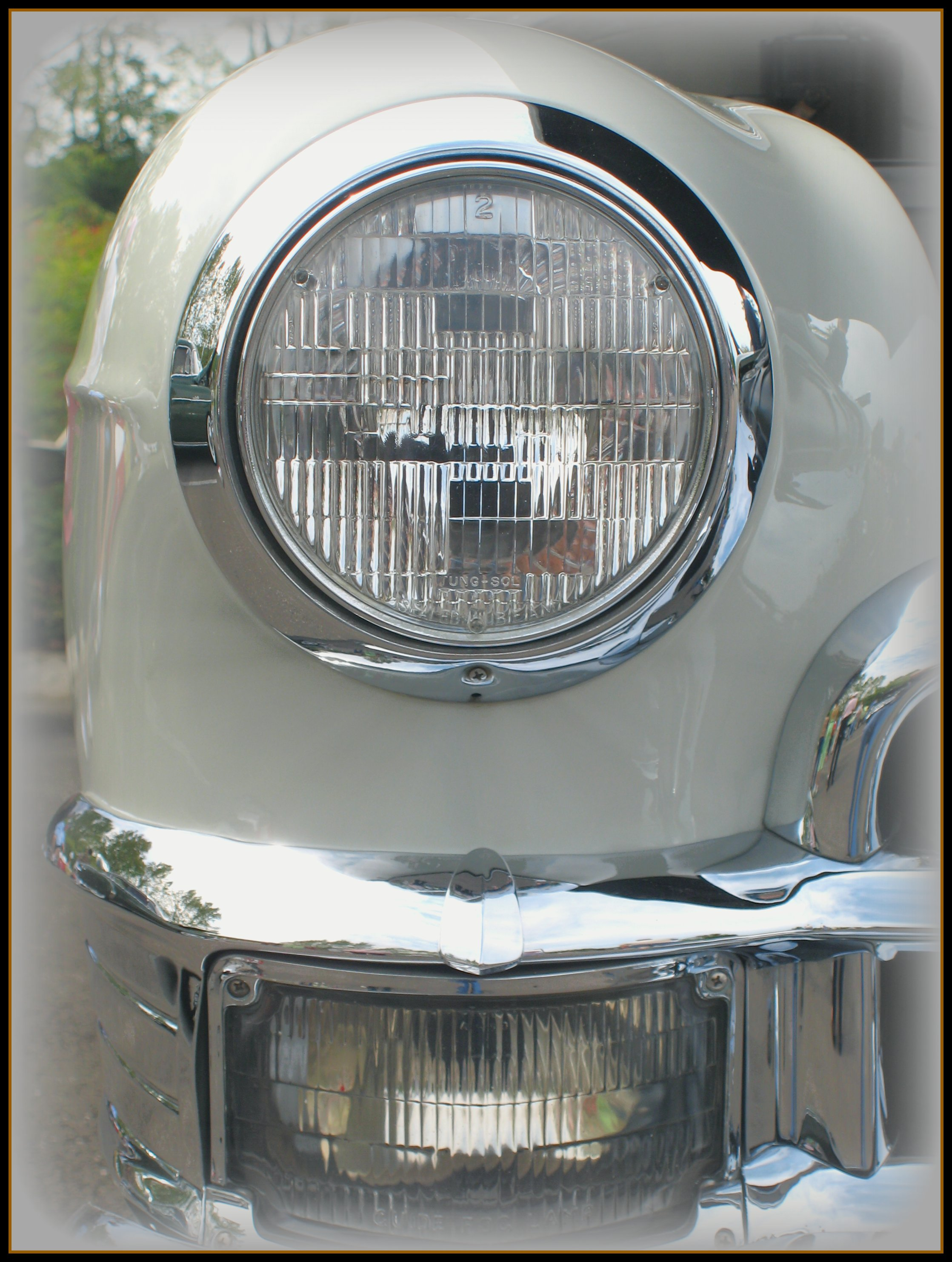
Number 2, Sealed Beam twin beam lamp size 7' with embossed TUNG-SOL on 50 Cadillac Coupe de Ville

Tung-Sol worked with Corning Glassworks to produce the bulb sleeves for incandescent lamps on Corning's ribbon cutting machines, otherwise they would have to use the only other producer, which was General Electric. Although, Corning supplied only small lamp firms. A ribbon machine was used for blowing glass making up to 120,000 small auto bulbs per hour in production.

Vision-Aid headlamps came in standard 7" size for traffic and weather use.

Their 1959 A-21 Lamp Catalog provided physical and electrical specifications of 284 miniature and sealed beam lamps.

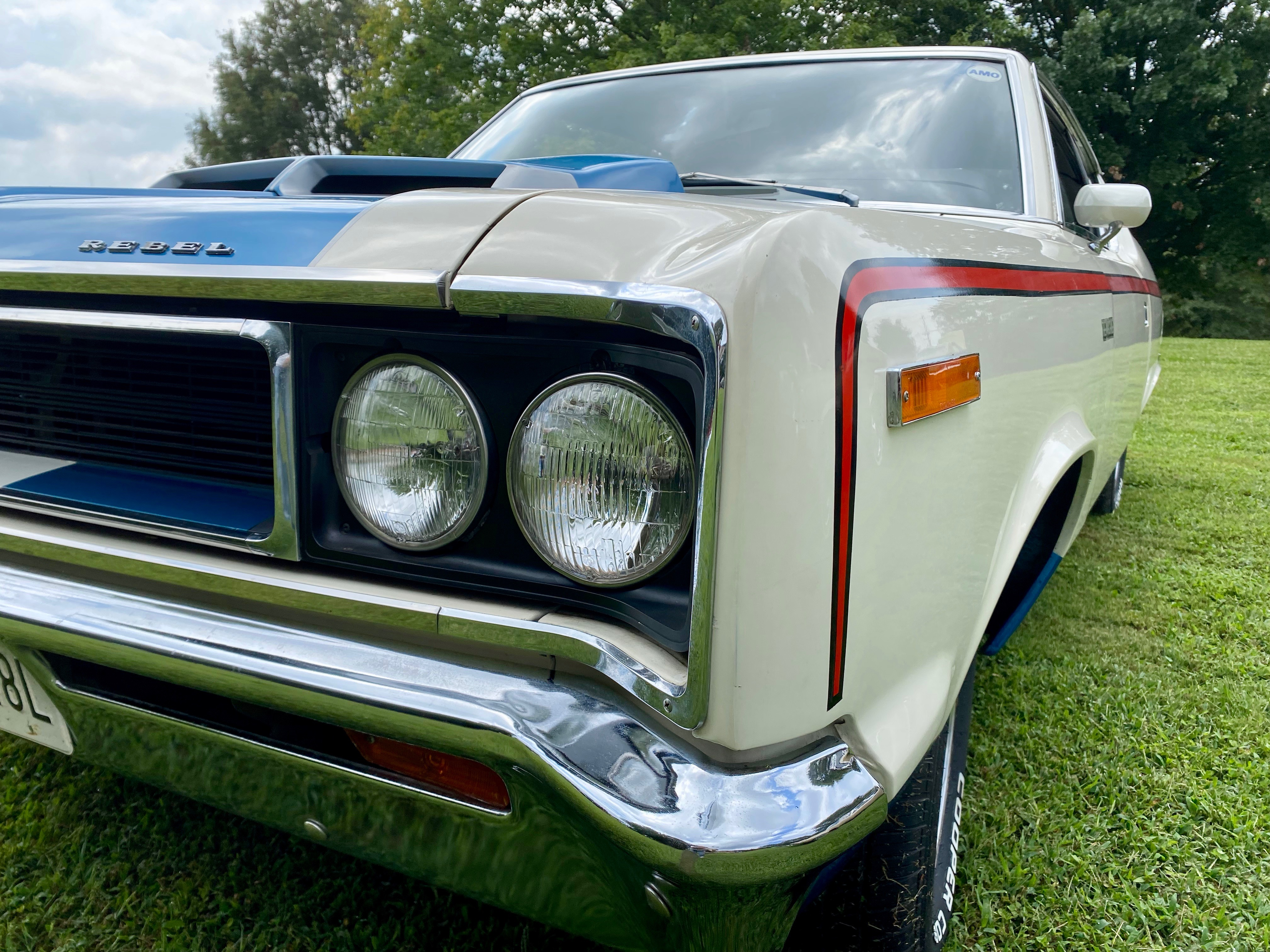
Tung-Sol 5.75" high and low (2 marking) beam headlights with TS logo after 1964 production change on original 1970 AMC Rebel

The headlight lamps had the word "TUNG-SOL" prior to 1964 production and the letters "TS" above "SEALED BEAM" after this production date. Tung-Sol was producing replacement equipment lamps for Atlas Supply Company and identification was embossed with their logo above "SEALED BEAM" as differentiating from the Westinghouse and General Electric produced lamps with Atlas name. A top most number as 1 indicates a high beam lamp and a 2 indicates a low or twin beam lamp. Only 5.75" lamps were high or low beam, whereas 7" lamps were twin beam lamp with the 2 on the top most edge of the headlight.

About 1967, American Motors Corporation had Tung-Sol headlights on all their passengers vehicles up to October 1974 data.

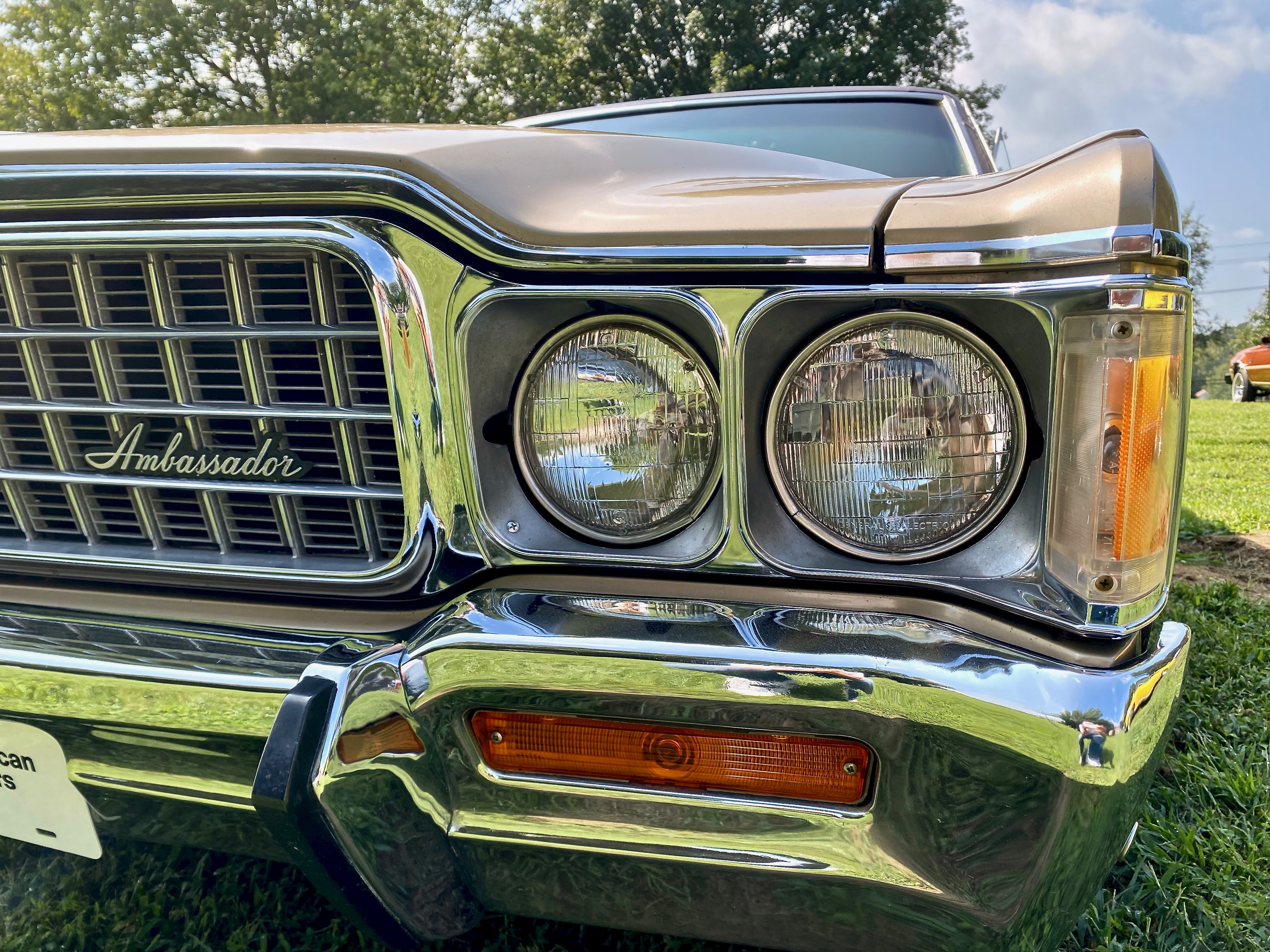
Tung-Sol 5.75" high beam (1 top marking) headlight left (original) with TS logo and GE 5.75" low beam headlight (2 top marking) right (replacement) with GENERAL GE ELECTRIC logo on 1972 AMC Ambassador sedan

Tung-Sol manufactured right hand drive lamps to supplier LUCAS, showing the LUCAS logo in the center of the lamp and a T-S stamping with model number on the rear side. There were a 7" beam used in English cars for example model 7002 rated at 60W high beam / 45W low beam.

== Electronics ==
Tung Sol Electric, Inc., of Newark was one supplier that produced electron tubes for the IBM 701 Data Processing System, a military scientific computer introduced in 1952.

The issue of Signal magazine, dated January–February 1953, shows an advertisement from Tung-Sol indicating they only make tubes- no sets, and no equipment.

Tung-Sol created the 6550 vacuum tube, a specialized Hi-Fi audio tube in 1954.

The 1956 Hewlett-Packard MODEL 650A Test Oscillator Operator and Service Manual indicated Tung-Sol as a replacement parts designated manufacturer without a part referenced in the specific model.

On October 1, 1959, Tung-Sol provided a Price List on Electron Tubes for its commercial and government customers to purchase in bulk pricing. There were industrial, special purpose, military tubes and receiving tubes. Based on the information, 43% (3 pages of parts) were industrial, special purpose, military tubes to 57% (2 pages with double columns of parts) were receiving tubes and model numbers with descriptions.

=== 28VS200BL ===
The 28VS200BL transformer-rectifier weighed less than 16 pounds and had dimensions of 5" x 7" x 11" for the dc power conversion equipment needed for the North American A3J Vigilante military aircraft. Chatham had the dependability and met the rigorous electrical requirements to equip two units delivering 200 Amps per unit. The Chatham division of Tung-Sol was the "world's leading supplier of airborne power conversions."

=== 2N transistors ===
In early 1957, the first RTMA/Jedec "2N" numbered 2N63, 2N64 and 2N65 transistors were commercially sold by Tung-Sol and year prior, Raytheon had these “2N6X” numbers. Tung-Sol may have been a supplier as a second-source to Raytheon. The 2N63 and 2N64 varied in power gain while the 2N65 had the highest gain of these germanium power transistors.

=== 2N174 transistor ===
This TO-36 type transistor was second source from Delco available types and known as 2N174 type at Tung-Sol. It came in the Baby-blue coloring on the exterior.

=== 2N441 transistor ===
Tung-Sol was a second source for some of the Delco TO-36 types available. A "2N441" was available from Tung-Sol with the Baby-blue exterior coloring.

=== 3B28 ===
The 3B28 rectifier was a half-wave Xenon filled. Operated in any position. It had an ambient temperature between range -75° to +90 °C. The specification of inverse peak anode voltage was 10,000 with average current .25amps. The filament was a 2.5v with 5 amp specification. This was produced at Chatham Electronics, under Gera Corporation, during February 1956. The military specification, MIL-E-1, was numbered as 765B with brand JAN, according to the Tung-Sol price list of October 1959 at a net price bulked packed for the government at $3.70.

=== 4B32 ===
The 4832 was a half-wave Xenon filled rectifier. The specifications were the same with ambient temperature range -75° to +90 °C and inverse peak anode voltage of 10,000 with average anode current 1.25 amp as the 3B28, except the filament was at higher 5 volts and 7.5 amperage. The livingston plant of Chatham was producing these in February 1956. The military specification, MIL-E-1, was numbered as 891 with brand JAN, according to the Tung-Sol price list of October 1, 1959 at a net price bulked packed for the government at $7.50.

=== 5594 ===
In Tele-Tech and Electronic Industries, there was an August 1954 advertisement by Chatham Electronics, describing and showing a 5594 Xenon thyratron that operated at -55C to +90C temperature range. In the Tung-Sol price guide of 1959, it was brand X with description, "Xenon High Voltage Thyratron" and manufactured at the Livingston plant for $12.60.

=== 5651-WA ===
Another military specification component was the 5651-WA voltage reference tube. It had stable performance and rugged applications design. This model had specification that were available for commercial or reliable MIL type tubes needed for military requirements. Chatham in February 1956 was manufacturing this at Livingston plant during the ownership with Gera Corporation. This 5651-WA was available as military specification, MIL-E-1, numbered as 825A with brand JAN, in the Tung-Sol October 1, 1959 price list with a government price of $2.50, net price bulked packed. It was described as a "Rugged Miniature 87V Reference tube."

=== 5881 ===
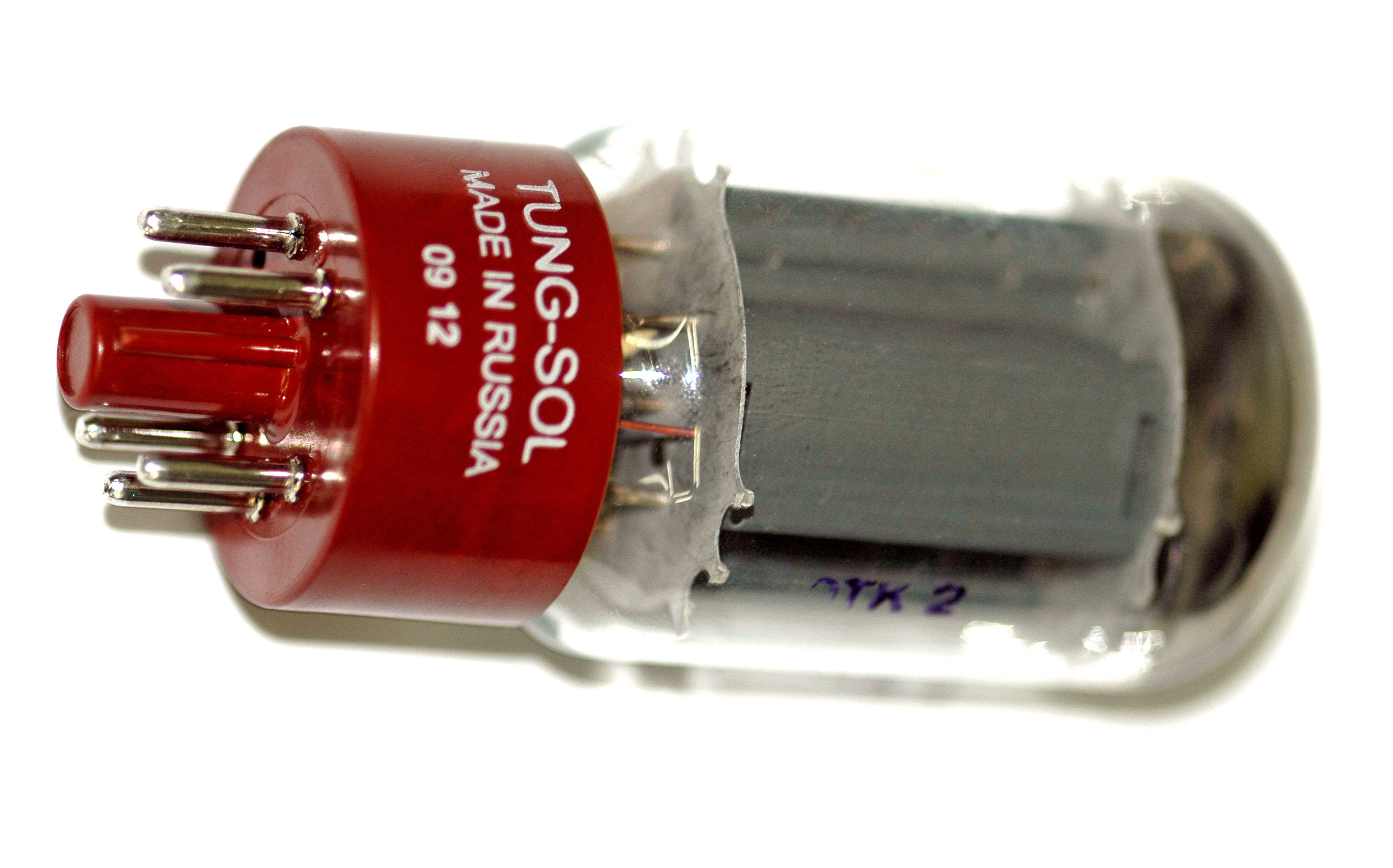
2012 Russian production Tung-Sol brand 5881 type vacuum tube

The 5881 is a beam power tube designed by Tung-Sol and introduced in 1950. The 5881 is an improved direct replacement for the 6L6 in any equipment originally using the 6L6 and facilitates new amplifier designs producing greater power output than those using 6L6's. The plate and screen power dissipation ratings of the 5881 are 120% of those of the 6L6. 5881's that were manufactured by Tung-Sol in the U.S. include gold plating of the control grid to reduce control grid emission and carbon treatment of the screen grid to reduce screen grid secondary emission while increasing screen grid thermal emissivity. The cathode sleeve is of pure electrolytic nickel. The anode is of carbon treated, extra thick nickel to facilitate the increased power dissipation rating. The anode is also zirconium painted to absorb gas if the tube is overheated. Button stem construction, dual mica supports and shorter overall length are said to make the tube more mechanically robust than the 6L6. In the 21st century, various companies manufacture and offer tubes as type 5881 to meet market demand for equipment maintenance and for use in newly manufactured equipment.

=== 5R4WGB ===
There was a rectifier manufactured during February 1956 timeframe as a full wave rectifier to MIL-E-1B (military spec) reliable tube specifications. The Chatham Electronics, Division of Gera Corporation, was manufacturing this component in Livingston location. This component was available as military specification, MIL-E-1, numbered as 116A with brand JAN, in price list with a government price of $5.27 when purchased as net price for packed in bulk. It was described as a "Rugged High Voltage, Full Wave, Vacuum Rectifier."

=== 6U8 ===
This receiver tube has two electrically independent sections-a triode and a pentode and was intended as a local oscillator mixer for TV and FM receivers. The pentode section of the tube may be used as a video amplifier, I. F. amplifier, synchronizing separator or sound limiter. The triode performs as a sync clipper, vertical, or horizontal oscillator. The pentode provided low local oscillator voltage injection with excellent gain resulted in low oscillator radiation from TV receivers. There was a 6U8A made at the Weatherly plant in October 1959, according to the Tung-Sol price list with no type approval for a military specification.

=== 6336 ===
A twin triode used for voltage regulation was available as model 6336. There were specifications for the model as high plate dissipation and a hard glass envelope. Manufacturing was done at the Livingston plant under Gera Corporation, having Chatham Electronics with a February 1956 ownership. There was a 6336A available as military specification, MIL-E-1, numbered as 704B-NAVY with brand USN, in Tung-Sols' October 1, 1959 price list at a government price of $11.50, packed for bulk for the net price. It was described as a "Long Life Rugged 6336."

=== 6394 ===
In an August 1954 advertisement by Chatham Electronics, there was a 6394 twin triode that was similar to the 6336 except it was 26.5 voltage heater instead of the 6.3 voltage heater. In a Tung-Sol price guide of 1959, there was a 6394A as a non-military specification brand X with a description, "6336A with 26 volt heater" manufactured at the Livingston plant for $22.70.

=== 6528 ===
The 6528 regulator tube is a medium mu triode, high current twin triode which provided low current drop and control sensitivity. It allowed fewer tube passing sections and permitted lower range control circuits. Rated at 60 Watts max plate dissipation per tube and 400 max plate voltage. According to the Tung-Sol price list of 1959, it was not a military specification and was branded as X with the Livingston plant as point of manufacturing. The individual price was $21.85, whereas bulk price was commercially at $13.00.

=== 6550 ===
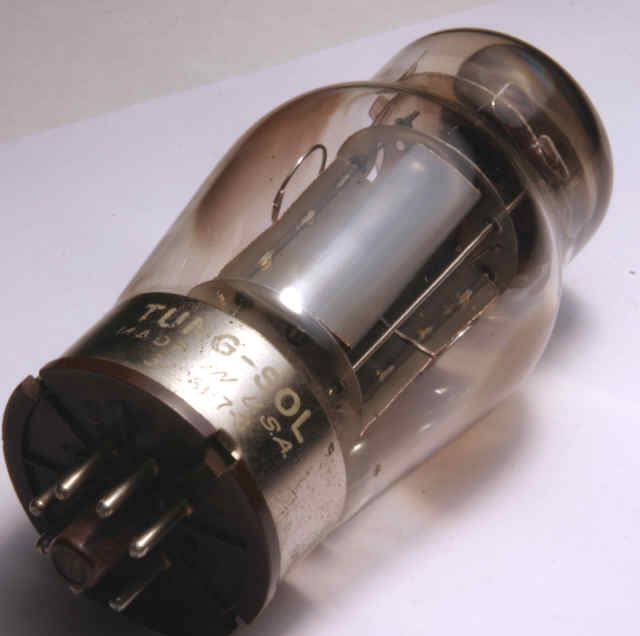
Tung-Sol 6550

The 6550 is a beam power tube designed by Tung-Sol for application as an audio frequency power amplifier and introduced in 1954. Tung-Sol literature refers to the 6550 variously as a beam power amplifier, power pentode and beam pentode, with the latter two names viewing the beam confining structure as a fifth electrode. The plate dissipation rating was introduced as 35 watts, later Tung-Sol data sheets give the plate dissipation rating as 42 watts. Screen power dissipation rating is given as 6 watts. Primary emission of electrons from the control grid is reduced by gold plating of the grid. The beam confining electrode is a rectangular enclosure surrounding the central electrodes and having two rectangular beam apertures. The electrodes are connected to the octal base in the same sequence as the 6L6. Two 6550's, in an appropriate amplifier circuit, are capable of delivering 100 watts power output. Tung-Sol used a short ST-16 envelope for the tube. In 1959, 6550's were being manufactured at Tung-Sol's Bloomfield, New Jersey plant. RCA also produced the 6550. General Electric produced the 6550-A, having the same power ratings but with a T-14 straight-sided envelope. Philips/ECG, in the U.S., produced 6550 tubes with the T-14 straight-sided envelope. In the 21st century, various factories outside of the U.S. manufacture 6550 type tubes to meet market demand for equipment maintenance and use in new designs.

=== 703A ===
The 703A was a tube transmitting triode as the same as Western Electric 703 A tube. Filament Vf 1.15 Volts / If: 4.5 Ampere / Description "Door-knob" type shape UHF transmitting triode, usable as oscillator, amplifier or mixer up to 1500 MHz. 20W anode dissipation. Made by WE and Tung-Sol with a copyright dated 1943 on the data sheet. It could come in either metal or with graphite anode. Used in radar sets for the military.

=== EI-4 ===
Tung-Sol EI-4 was a thyratron capacitor discharge ignition or electronic ignition system introduced in 1962.

=== CH1027 ===
A Curristor vacuum tube that had four types of nitrogen-filled, radioactive constant-current tubes with a current plateau from 25 to 500 V, all-glass wire-ended, active material is 226Ra with a half-life of 1601 years, for linear capacitor charging and draining in missile and ordinance mine timing circuits, instrumentation biasing, as current reference, etc.:

- -CH1027-9 – 10−9 A, 18.75 μCi (694 kBq)
- -CH1027-10 – 10−10 A, 1.875 μCi (69.4 kBq)
- -CH1027-11 – 10−11 A, 187.5 nCi (6.94 kBq)
- -CH1027-12 – 10−12 A, 18.75 nCi (694 Bq)

=== SC-102 ===
Chatham Electronics, Model SC-102, incorporated a thallium-activated sodium iodide crystal for changing radiation into scintillations of viewable light. The crystal is optical, coupled by a photomultiplier tube. Designed specially with circuits that discriminate against spurious noise signals and count the scintillations, radiation is measured by minute variations in levels to be detected with output pointer needle readings on the instrument. The design of the SC-102 can be used for oil prospecting, well logging, assaying of ore samples in the field, and uranium prospecting.

=== TS176 ===
There was a Motorola 12-volt car radio tube compliment as a Motorola TO-3 "2N-176" Power Transistor. Tung-Sol identified a device as "TS176" as a coincidence or intentionally, because both also had a Baby-Blue color on the finished material. The inventory lists indicated this product for a few years after the introduction.

=== TS612 ===
By 1957, a 15 watts of dissipation TO-3 power transistor type was released, model "TS612." This model was considered Motorola 2N-612 numbering scheme.

=== TS613 ===
About 1957, a 15 watts of dissipation power transistor type was released, model "TS613" and was made for switching circuits as a type TO-3 device. This model was considered Motorola 2N-613 numbering scheme.

=== TS614 ===
Early 1957, a 15 watts of dissipation power TO-3 transistor type was released as the "TS614." The model was considered Motorola 2N-614 numbering scheme.

=== VC-1258 ===
The livingston plant in Chatham was producing these in February 1956 under Gera Corporation. The VC-1258 is a miniature hydrogen thyratron for pulse generation. It was designed to handle 10 kW peak pulse power. This VC-1258 was available as military specification, MIL-E-1, numbered as 131C with brand JAN, in the Tung-Sol October 1, 1959 price list for bulked packed government price of $18.90. In the price list, it is listed as 1258 and described as a "miniature hydrogen thyratron, 10kw peak pulse power."

=== TV damper tubes ===
Damper tubes were high-voltage vacuum tubes. They were constructed with electrophoretically coated heater peaks and insulator coils. The tubes had a "cool" running cathode; a copper core plate designed for maximum dissipation and less back emission. The physical characteristics minimized arcing. Having an electrically isolated insulator coil maintained high-voltage insulation for the shortest possible warm-up time of the tube. Tung-Sol stated in print advertisement for TV damper tube replacements as their products as structural standards exhibited of the damper tubes were far than common ones failing and proved fully "reliable under the most adverse conditions." Models listed as TV damper tubes in the May 1961 Electronics Technician service magazine were the following: 6/12AF3, 6DA4A, 6/12/17AX4GTB, 6DE4, 6/19AU4GTA, 6V3A, 6/25W4GT, 12D4A

== Tung-Sol brand in Russian fabrication ==
The company New Sensor Corporation of Long Island, New York received a trademark serial number as 76411877 for the Tung-Sol electron tubes brand in a filing, May 24, 2002. The Tung-Sol brand name is now owned by the New Sensor Corporation, the same company that owns the brands Sovtek and Electro-Harmonix.
