= Big Muff =

Effect for electric guitar

Big Muff Pi
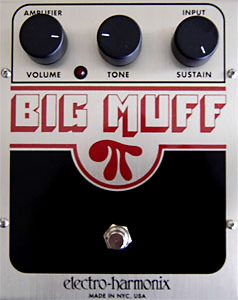
- Big Muff Pi NYC Reissue Version
- Manufacturer: Electro-Harmonix, Sovtek
- Dates: 1969–1984, 1992–present

Technical specifications
- Effects type: Fuzz
- Hardware: Analog

Controls

Input/output
- Inputs: mono
- Outputs: mono

The Big Muff Pi (π), often known simply as the Big Muff, is a fuzz effects pedal made by New York City-based Electro-Harmonix. Marketed as a "distortion/sustainer" upon its release in 1969, the Big Muff produces a smooth and heavily saturated distortion with long sustain, which has made it widely popular among electric guitarists. Early adopters included Jimi Hendrix, who purchased one of the first units, and Carlos Santana and David Gilmour. The Big Muff went through multiple circuit variations, mostly component value changes, until Electro-Harmonix went bankrupt in 1984 and production ceased. Despite no longer being on the market, the Big Muff remained popular, becoming a key element in the sound of alternative rock and commanding high prices on the emerging vintage market. In 1992, Electro-Harmonix founder Mike Matthews renewed production of the Big Muff through his Russian brand Sovtek, with manufacturing returning to the U.S. in 2000. Electro-Harmonix has since released multiple new versions of the Big Muff, as well as several reissues of popular circuit variations from the original production run.

== History ==
=== Original production (1969–1984) ===
Following the success of the Rolling Stones' hit "(I Can't Get No) Satisfaction" and its fuzz-heavy guitar riff, multiple manufacturers began making transistor-based fuzz pedals. Mosrite rebranded its own Fuzzrite as "the Foxey Lady"—a reference to the song "Foxy Lady" by the Jimi Hendrix Experience—in 1967 for production by Mike Matthews on behalf of the Guild Guitar Company. With the success of the Foxey Lady, Matthews founded Electro-Harmonix in 1968 to manufacture new designs. This included the dual-transistor Muff Fuzz early in 1969, so named for its muffled sound. The four-transistor Big Muff Pi model, co-designed with Bob Myer, followed by the end of the year. Matthews first sold Big Muffs to Manny's Music in New York City, where Jimi Hendrix was among the first artists to purchase one, and it became a major success for Electro-Harmonix.

These early Big Muffs are known as the "Triangle" versions due to their triangular control knob layout. They used a plain metallic case with black letters. This was updated in 1973 with red, blue, purple, or black graphics and included a ram's head motif in the bottom-right corner. This redesign also used a larger case. In 1976, the outward design changed again to red and black graphics that would become standard in later production runs. During this time, many notable guitarists used Big Muffs, including Carlos Santana and David Gilmour of Pink Floyd. In the late 1970s, Electro-Harmonix explored a circuit redesign in which the standard model's four transistors were replaced with two op amps, resulting in a different sound and becoming known as the Op Amp Big Muff.

By the early 1980s, Electro-Harmonix was struggling due to competition from Japanese imports as well as component shortages and filed for bankruptcy in 1984. The Big Muff remained popular, however, despite the end of the company. It inspired the title of Mudhoney's 1988 debut EP Superfuzz Bigmuff, and had earlier been used for the name of Depeche Mode's instrumental "Big Muff" off of their 1981 album Speak & Spell.

=== Sovtek and EHX's return (1992–present) ===
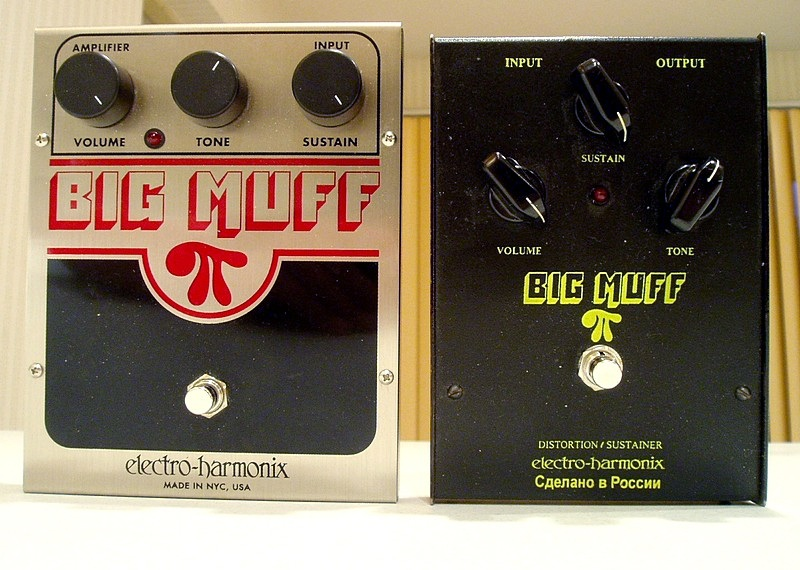
An NYC Reissue Big Muff (left) and a Russian-made Big Muff (right)

With the end of the Cold War, Matthews sought business opportunities in Russia, where he founded Sovtek, which became a major supplier of vacuum tubes to amplifier brands like Marshall, Fender, and Mesa/Boogie. Sovtek's success allowed Matthews to buy back the Electro-Harmonix name and take advantage of the growing vintage gear market, on which original Big Muffs were selling for significantly more than the new prices had been. Matthews turned over the Big Muff design to a small, Russian military factory, which re-engineered much of the pedal, resulting in more emphasis on bass and midrange frequencies. Released in 1992, this version was dubbed the "Civil War" Big Muff, and "Green Russian" and "Black Russian" variants followed. Lee Ranaldo and Thurston Moore of Sonic Youth both preferred this Sovtek version. Into the mid-1990s, the Big Muff became an integral part of the sound of many alternative rock bands, including the Smashing Pumpkins, Dinosaur Jr., NOFX, and Bush. In 2000, Electro-Harmonix resumed production of the Big Muff in the United States with the Big Muff Pi NYC Reissue, which was a revised take on a late-1970s model.

Aside from the standard Big Muff, Electro-Harmonix has made new iterations of the pedal, like the Nano Muff; the Metal Muff, which has a 3-band EQ; the Little Big Muff, a smaller variation of the standard model; and the Deluxe Big Muff. Signature editions of the Big Muff have also been released, such as the Mogwai big muff, and a signature model for J Mascis. Reissues of older Big Muff versions include the original "Triangle" Big Muff, as well as the Ram's Head, Op Amp, and Green Russian Big Muffs. In 2025, JHS and Electro-Harmonix released the Big Muff 2, based on a circuit by Bob Myer that never went in to production featuring a dual op-amp circuit.

== Design ==
The Big Muff is characterized by a smooth and heavily saturated distortion with long sustain, which the pedal produces through a relatively simple circuit consisting of four transistor gain stages and a tone stack placed before the output. Electro-Harmonix has released many different versions of the pedal, mostly changing various values in an otherwise consistent circuit.

The first stage is the input gain stage, which boosts and buffers the incoming signal while removing unnecessary frequencies. The Sustain (or gain) control is placed here, adjusting the amount of signal entering the next part of the circuit. Two clipping stages follow, both using identical configurations consisting of a pair of diodes in each feedback loop for soft clipping. By distorting the signal twice in a row, the Big Muff is capable of harsh levels of distortion more typically associated with hard-clipping circuitry. The Big Muff tone stack uses two filters, one low-pass and one high-pass, which are blended together to an amount set by the tone control. With the tone control in its middle position, the filters are combined, leading to a reduction in midrange frequencies. The Big Muff tone stack design is more powerful than a conventional passive tone stack, which simply rolls off treble content, and can result in overly bright or dark tones. As a result, the tone stack is a common target for modifications. Finally, the output stage boosts the signal to compensate for any volume loss caused by the tone stack filters. Many of the Big Muff's component and value changes have affected how much this stage boosts the outgoing signal.

== Notable versions ==
Electro-Harmonix has released numerous iterations of the Big Muff since its introduction, with both minor and major changes to its circuit and housing. Players often prefer specific versions, and Electro-Harmonix has reissued several of them.

Triangle

The original Big Muff design of 1969 used a large grey case with the Volume, Sustain, and Tone controls arranged in a triangular format. Compared to later iterations, this so-called Triangle Big Muff produced a smoother, less-fuzzy character.

Ram's Head

In the early- to mid-1970s, Electro-Harmonix produced a generation of Big Muffs colloquially known as the Ram's Head Big Muff for the ram's head icon on the case's lower-right corner. This Big Muff version is "growlier" in the midrange and in its character it sits between the earlier Triangle and later Russian versions. Pink Floyd's David Gilmour notably preferred this version.

Green Russian

In the 1990s, production of the Big Muff moved to Russia. There, Sovtek produced what became known as the Green Russian Big Muff for its military-style olive-green-colored case and black letters. The Green Russian featured a much more prominent low-end than other Big Muffs and it became popular among bassists, as well as grunge and punk guitarists. Its success helped Electro-Harmonix recover from bankruptcy.

Op-Amp

The Op-Amp Big Muff represented a significant departure from the original's circuit and tone. The Op-Amp Big Muff used op amps rather than transistors, and had three gain stages instead of four. A toggle switch allowed users to bypass the tone circuit. The Op-Amp Big Muff created a midrange-heavy sound with a stronger, more saturated fuzz character. Billy Corgan of the Smashing Pumpkins helped popularize this version, using it on 1993's Siamese Dream.

== Notable users ==
- Jack White
- David Gilmour
- Billy Corgan
- J Mascis

== See also ==
- List of distortion pedals
