= Electro-Harmonix =

Guitar effect pedal company

- Type: Private
- Industry: Consumer electronics
- Founded: 1968; 58 years ago
- Founder: Mike Matthews
- Headquarters: New York City, United States
- Products: Effects pedals, vacuum tubes, amplifiers, acoustic guitars
- Parent: New Sensor Corporation
- Website: ehx.com

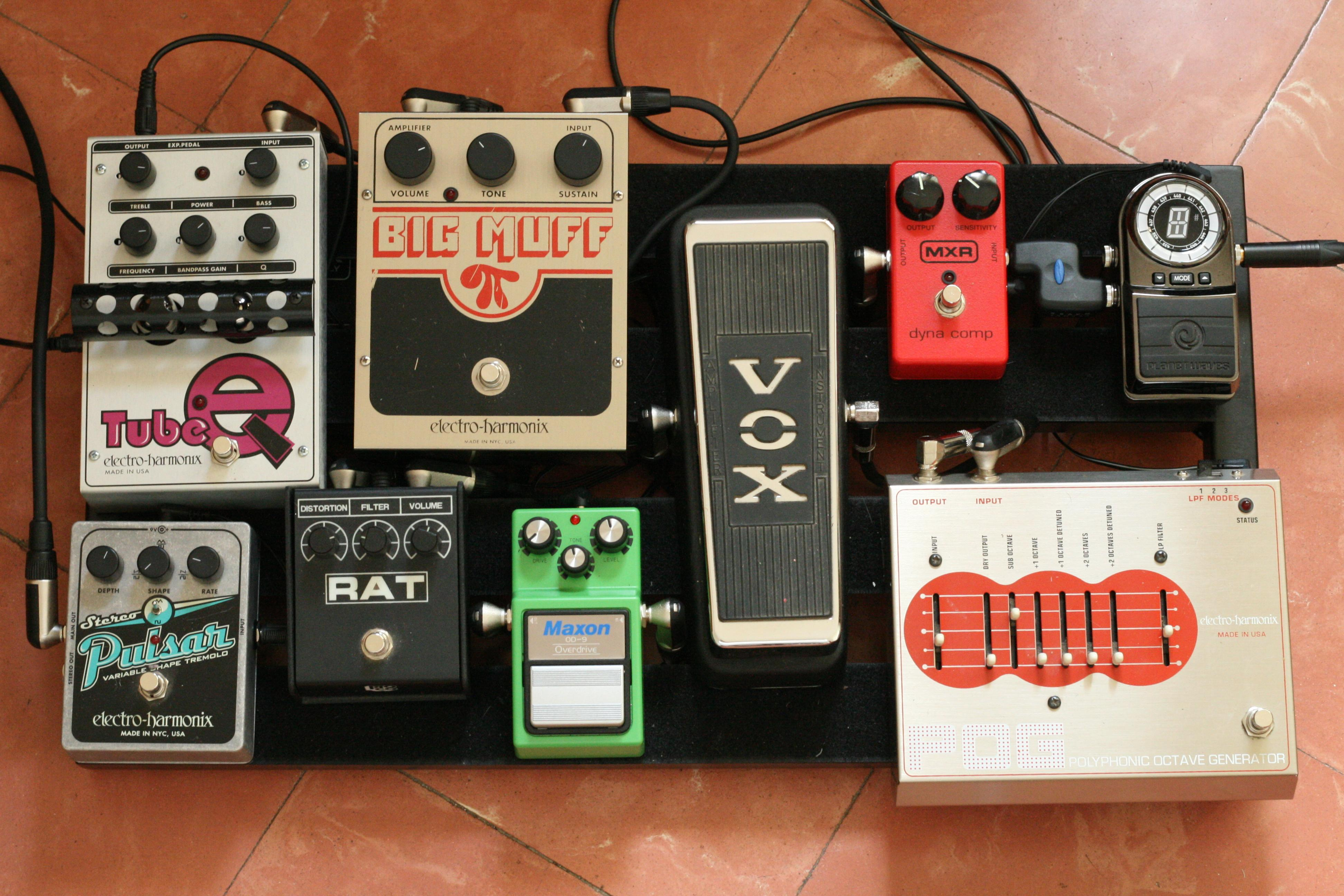
A guitar pedal board, comprising several EHX pedals, including a Big Muff, POG (Polyphonic Octave Generator), a Stereo Pulsar tremolo and a Tube EQ.

Electro-Harmonix (or EHX) is an American company founded by Mike Matthews in 1968 to produce effects pedals for electric guitar and bass. Located in New York City, Electro-Harmonix became an early pioneer in effects pedal design and developed multiple affordable and influential models throughout the late 1960s and 1970s, including the Big Muff fuzz, Small Stone phaser, Memory Man delay, and Electric Mistress flanger. Notable users have included Jimi Hendrix, Carlos Santana, Adrian Belew, Steve Howe, Jimmy Page, and Andy Summers. EHX closed in 1984 due to financial struggles, with Matthews founding the New Sensor Corporation to pursue business ventures in Russia under the brand name Sovtek. Sovtek's success selling vacuum tubes for guitar amplifiers and audio systems allowed Matthews to recover the Electro-Harmonix brand from bankruptcy, and throughout the 1990s Sovtek manufactured Electro-Harmonix pedals in Russia. Production returned to the United States in 2000, with the brand releasing both new models and reissues of many of its classic designs.

== History ==
=== Mike Matthews ===
As a child, Mike Matthews was taught to play classical piano by his mother, but by 11th grade he had become more interested in playing boogie-woogie and soon after rock and roll. Matthews later enrolled in Cornell University, where an all-black R&B group inspired him to play keyboards in a funkier style of music like Wilson Pickett and the Isley Brothers. Matthews made money during this time by promoting rock and roll concerts and noticed the growing prominence of electric guitar players on the nearby New York City music scene. Seeing an opportunity, Matthews took a job offer from IBM in New York City to stay connected to the city's music scene and eventually start his own business.

By this time, the Rolling Stones had scored a hit with "(I Can't Get No) Satisfaction", and Maestro was struggling to keep up with demand for their Fuzz-Tone pedal Keith Richards had used on the song's main riff. The owner of a local repair shop offered to go into business with Matthews producing fuzz pedals of their own only to drop out, leaving Matthews to contract out the work. Guild Guitar Company bought all of Matthews' stock and marketed the pedals as the Foxey Lady, in reference to the Jimi Hendrix Experience song "Foxy Lady". Matthews, however, understood one of the keys to Hendrix's sound was the sustain he created with finger vibrato, so he asked inventor Bob Myer of Bell Labs to design a "sustainer" effect pedal that would not produce distortion. When Matthews went to Myer's lab, he was instead impressed with the small, single-transistor preamp that Myer was using to test prototypes. This preamp went into overdrive when pushed, even into a clean amplifier, and Matthews opted to pursue this as a product instead.

=== Electro-Harmonix, first era ===
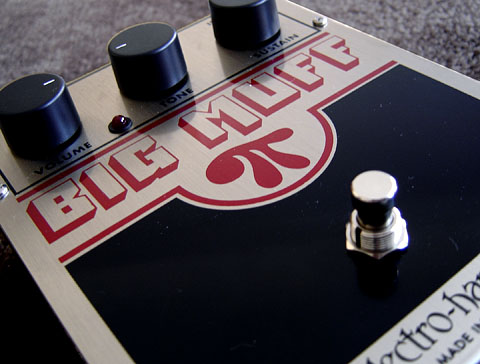
An Electro-Harmonix Big Muff

With $1,000, Matthews launched Electro-Harmonix in 1968 and exhibited Myer's preamp design as the LPB-1 Linear Power Booster at that year's NAMM Show in Chicago. The LPB-1 sold thousands of units, initially through mail order, allowing Matthews to quit his job at IBM and devote himself full-time to guitar effects.

Matthews capitalized on the success of the LPB-1 by releasing several more products using the same compact form factor of the LPB-1, including the Muff Fuzz, Screaming Bird Treble Booster, and Mole Bass Booster. The Muff Fuzz—named for its muffled sound quality—used a pair of transistors. This was updated to four transistors for the 1969 follow-up model, the Big Muff. Many notable players, like Hendrix and David Gilmour, began using the Big Muff and it became a major success for the young brand. Electro-Harmonix scored another major success in 1974 with the Small Stone phase shifter, which was the first design created for the brand by engineer David Cockerell and ended up outselling even the Big Muff. Other popular pedals EHX released in the 1970s included the Memory Man delay effect, which was updated several times, including with a chorus/vibrato switch as the Deluxe Memory Man; and the Electric Lady flanger. In 1978, the company grossed $5,000,000 and had offices in New York City, Toronto, London, and Tokyo.

By 1982, Electro-Harmonix employed around 200 people, but an aggressive campaign by a local trade union (that few of EHX's employees wished to join) caused an alarmed financial backer to pull their funds and Matthews was forced to file for bankruptcy. He purchased the company back after selling some property and resumed production only to begin losing market share to Japanese imports. The situation became untenable when a Japanese parts supplier began giving Japanese effects companies preference over limited stock and EHX, unable to continue manufacturing certain pedals, filed for bankruptcy again in 1984.

Matthews then turned his attention to business opportunities in Russia, where Matthews found he could take advantage of the significant price fluctuations of Russian-made integrated circuits to sell them to the West at a profit.

=== Return of EHX ===
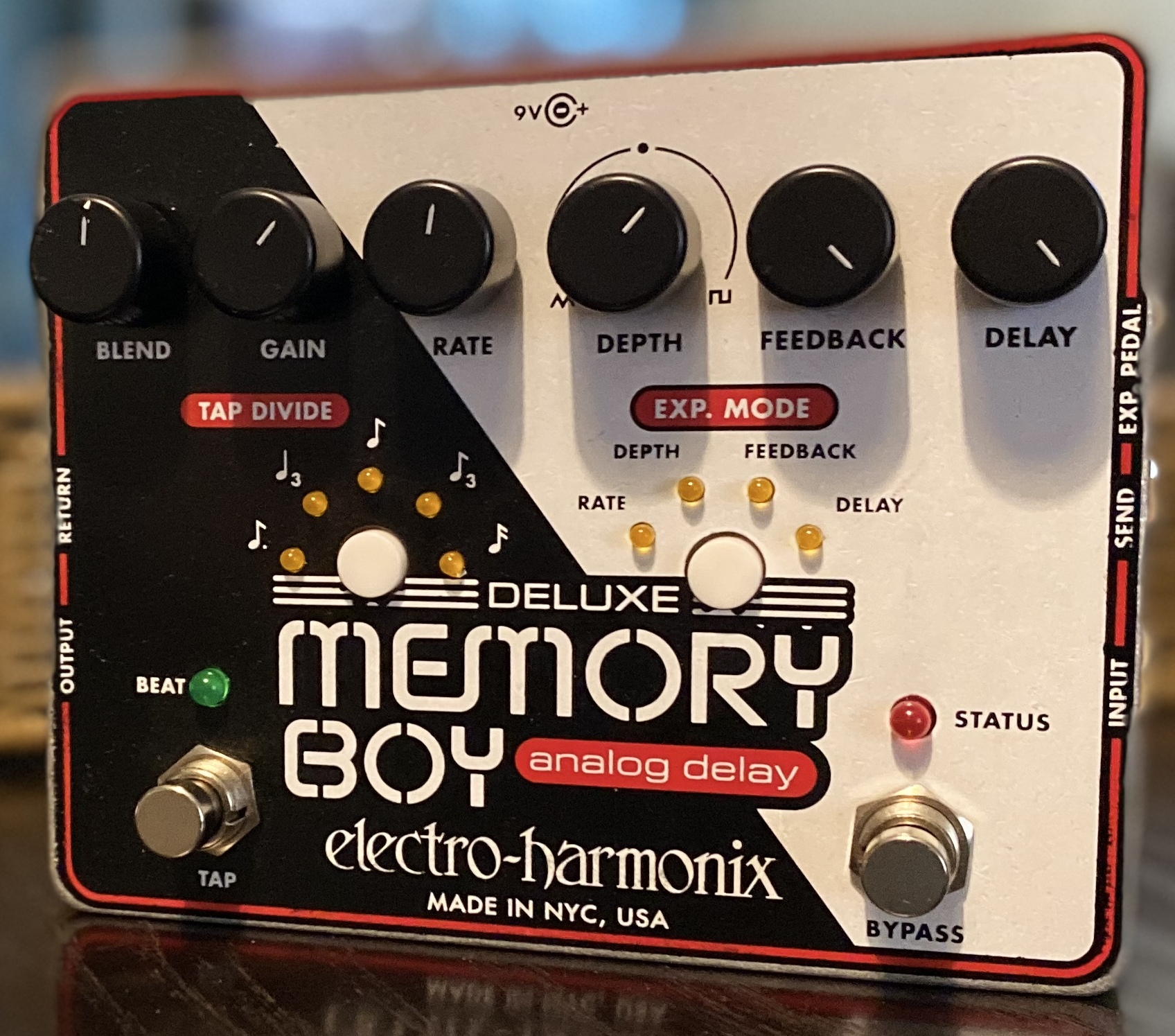
A Deluxe Memory Boy

By the late 1980s, vacuum tubes were a long-outdated form of technology, but they were still popular among guitar amplifier manufacturers, and Russia was one of the few places still producing them. Matthews founded the New Sensor Corporation and resold Russian vacuum tubes by himself out of his apartment. He then began contracting out the production of new vacuum tubes using the brand name Sovtek. The Russian military-industrial complex soon collapsed as the Cold War came to an end and an electronics conglomerate began selling off its individual companies, including Sovtek's contractor, ProPul, the world's largest vacuum tube manufacturer. Matthews purchased ProPul, giving him ownership of vacuum tube brand names like Mullard and Tung-Sol. Within a few years, Matthews became a major supplier to guitar amplifier brands including Marshall, Fender, and Mesa/Boogie. This success allowed Matthews to buy back the Electro-Harmonix name and take advantage of the growing vintage gear market, on which original EHX pedals like the Big Muff were selling for significantly more than the new prices had been.

Sovtek began releasing Russian-made versions of classic Electro-Harmonix pedals in 1992. Sovtek also produced amps like the Mig 50, a modified Fender circuit, and while the sounds were good and the costs could be kept low, reliability was poor, so Matthews ceased amp production by 1997 to focus on EHX's line of pedals. In 2000, Matthews returned production of Electro-Harmonix's pedals to New York City and continued releasing both reissued designs and new ones, such as 2005's POG Polyphonic Octave Generator. In 2006, the company introduced smaller "micro" and "nano" form factor effect lines using surface-mount circuit components. Circuit board manufacture was outsourced and the pedals assembled in New York.

Following the 2022 Russian invasion of Ukraine, Electro-Harmonix was a notable American company that did not leave Russia. Matthews cited the unique skillset of his Russian employees in building vacuum tubes, which only one other company produced—Slovakia's JJ Electronics—as his main reason. Russia also exempted EHX from the country's new ban on exporting certain products, including vacuum tubes. Had the ban been maintained or had Electro-Harmonix left the country and halted production, it would have "spelled disaster" for the audio market given EHX's dominant position.

== Effects pedals ==
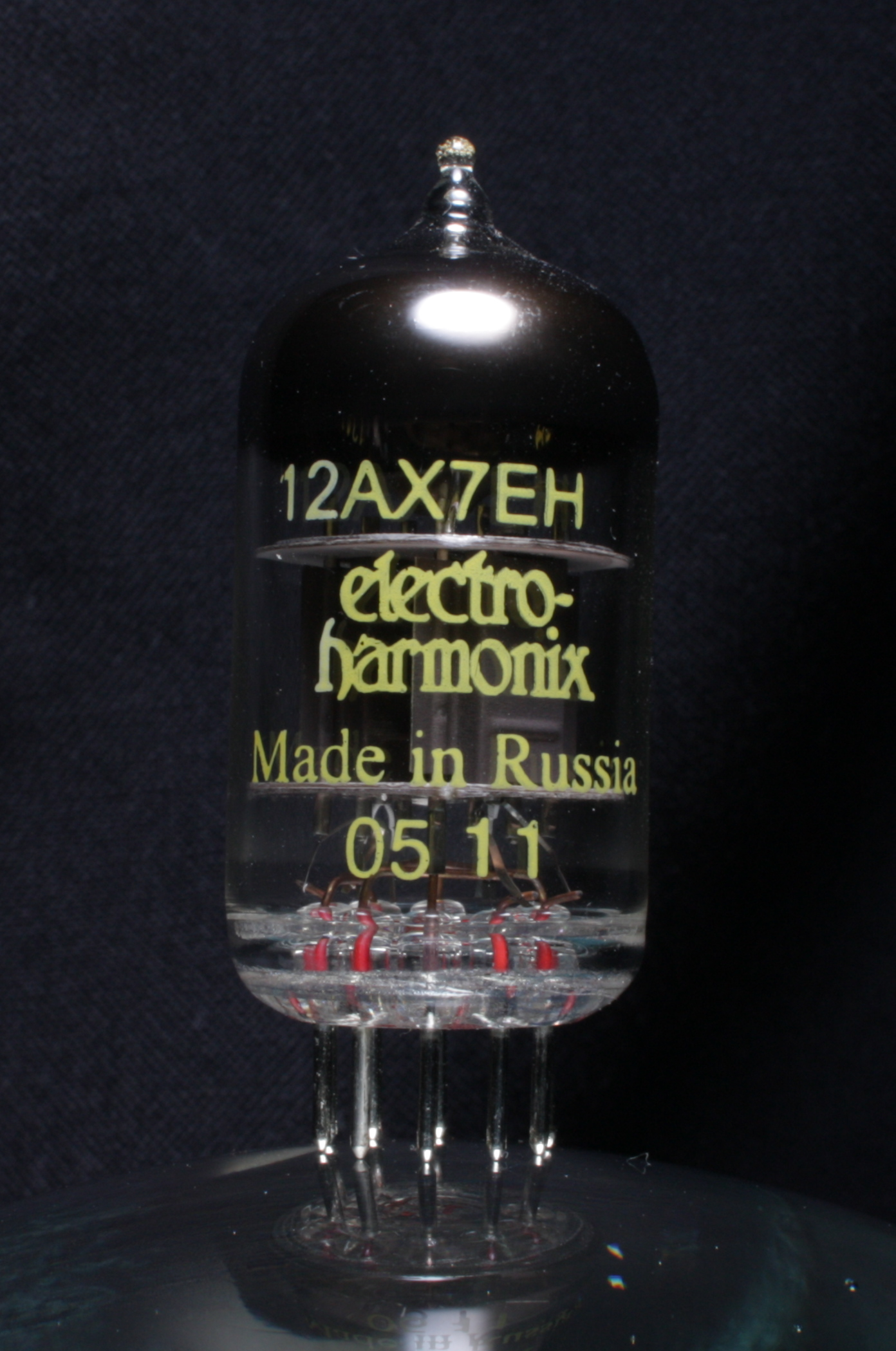
Electro-Harmonix 12AX7EH vacuum tube used in a preamp.

Electro-Harmonix produces pedals with many different types of sound manipulation suitable for guitar, bass, vocal, keyboard, and other instruments.

It also sells rebranded vacuum tubes carrying the Electro-Harmonix brand name. As of 2024, ExpoPul factory in Saratov, southwestern Russia, continued to produce vacuum tubes for Electro-Harmonix. The operation in Russia employs more than 300 individuals, in contrast to the 125 employees in New York. As of 2025, vacuum tubes produced by ExpoPul in Russia are still available for purchase on the official Electro-Harmonix website.

=== Big Muff ===
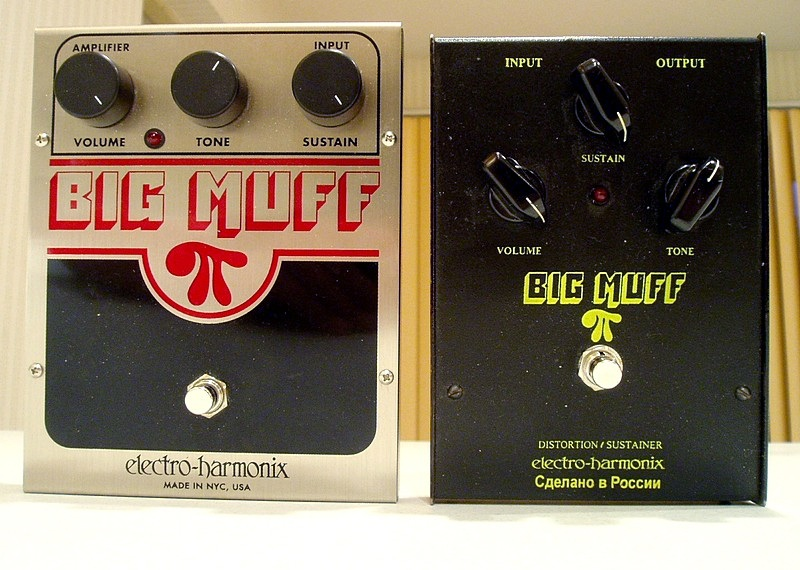
NYC & a Russian Sovtek re-issued versions

In 1969 Bob Myer and Mike Matthews designed the Big Muff Pi, a fuzzbox that added a bass-heavy sustain to any guitar sound. It is described by the company as "the finest harmonic distortion-sustain device developed to date". Originally this was intended to be a pedal that would mimic the fuzz tones of Jimi Hendrix and other guitarists at the time, but the result was a mix of a fuzz and distortion pedal with a very heavy sound. It also made small amps sound much better and allowed distortion at any volume.

The pedal sold well and was used by Carlos Santana, Pink Floyd's David Gilmour, Alex Lifeson of Rush and, later, Metallica's bassist Cliff Burton, The Jesus and Mary Chain, and in the 1990s KoRn's rhythm guitarist Munky, Vicente Freitas, Jack White of The White Stripes, J Mascis of Dinosaur Jr., The Edge of U2, and Billy Corgan (on The Smashing Pumpkins landmark album, Siamese Dream). The band Mudhoney titled their debut EP Superfuzz Bigmuff.

Although the first Big Muff production date was for many years cited as 1971, the first version of the Big Muff was actually sold in 1969 as a hand-made "perf board" version. A production version with an etched PCB was made in early 1970. Mike Matthews was friends with Jimi Hendrix and claims Jimi bought one from Manny's Music in New York, shortly after they were released and had one in the Electric Lady Studios shortly before Jimi's death in 1970. Several variations of the Big Muff Pi followed throughout the 1970s. As of 2012 Electro-Harmonix produced a reissue assembled in New York City; until 2009 it produced a version made by Sovtek in Russia which provided a slightly different tone. The Bass Big Muff replaced the Russian version.

Several other variations (some of which are not actually Big Muffs) of the pedal were in production as of 2012, including the Metal Muff (intended to achieve the higher gain Metal guitar sound), the Double Muff, which incorporates the original Muff Fuzz circuit, twice in series with a single overdrive control for each circuit, providing the user either with a cascaded 'Double Muff' sound or the original Muff Fuzz circuit, the Little Big Muff, a smaller version, and a variation in circuit, of the NYC Big Muff, which produces yet another variation in sound, and the Big Muff with Tone Wicker, which is similar to the 2008 revision NYC Big Muff, with two added features: a tone bypass switch allowing you to bypass the tone control and a switch that adjusts the frequency of three high frequency filters in the circuit. The Germanium 4 Big Muff Pi is a dual unit, housing an overdrive and a distortion circuit featuring 2 Germanium transistors each, and simulating a dying battery with a Volt control, which characteristically affects the sound of the distortion.

In 2018, Electro-Harmonix released three vintage Big Muff re-issues the Green Russian Big Muff, the Op-Amp Big Muff, and the Triangle Big Muff, and in early 2020 the Ram's Head Big Muff was reissued.

=== Phasers, chorus and flanger ===
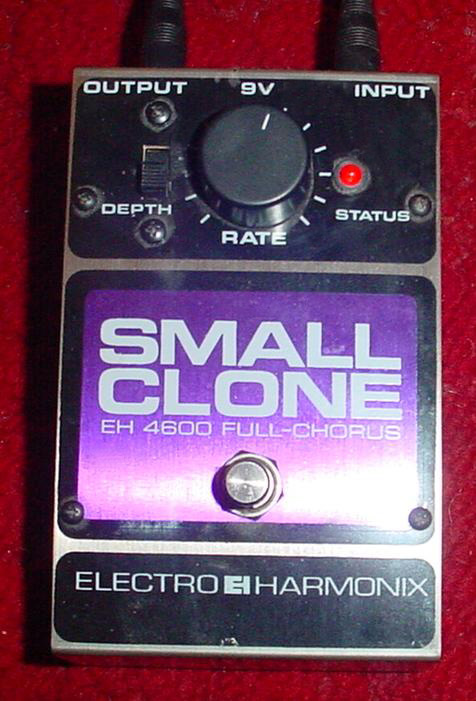
Small Clone chorus pedal

Electro-Harmonix often produces a range of pedals based on a single effect, and then combines two or more into higher end units. For instance, the Epitome combines the Micro POG, Stereo Electric Mistress, and Holy Grail Plus into one effect unit.

The widely used Small Stone phase shifter is a 4-stage phaser designed by David Cockerell, whom Electro-Harmonix hired from his former employer EMS. The phased sounds of French composer Jean-Michel Jarre depended heavily on the Small Stone unit. It was reissued years later by EHX and a smaller version of the pedal was eventually introduced in a 'Nano' casing (officially called the "Small Stone (Nano Chassis)").

The Small Clone chorus is a very popular chorus pedal, used by Kurt Cobain, both live and in studio. Like the Small Stone, it is issued in both the standard size and two different smaller versions (the Nano Clone is based on the Clone Theory circuit, while the neo clone is the standard).

The Electric Mistress is an analog flanger. It had first been sold in 1976 and was by that the first flanger in pedal format. The Deluxe version has been reissued and is still in production, although in 2015, a new Deluxe Electric Mistress was introduced in the company's smaller "XO" casing. As well, there are two digital recreations called NEO Mistress and Stereo Electric Mistress. Except for the very first blue/red version the Electric Mistress featured a "Filter Matrix mode" which allowed the user to freeze it at any point in the flange, offering distinctive chime-like tones. On the Neo and Stereo Mistress, this is achieved at a certain setting on the "rate" knob. Notable users include David Gilmour, Todd Rundgren, Alex Lifeson, Robin Trower, Andy Summers of The Police, J Mascis of Dinosaur Jr. and Red Hot Chili Peppers guitarist John Frusciante.

The Flanger Hoax pedal is a more advanced unit, allowing further control of the various parameters of phaser, flanger and chorusing effects.

The Polychorus allows highly adjustable chorus, flanger, filter matrix, and slapback echo effects. Notable users include Cobain (i.e. "Radio Friendly Unit Shifter"), Adrian Belew, and more recently Ryan Jarman of The Cribs.

Electro-Harmonix's 'XO' line added the Stereo Polyphase, an analog optical envelope- and LFO-controlled phase shifter.

=== Delays and loopers ===
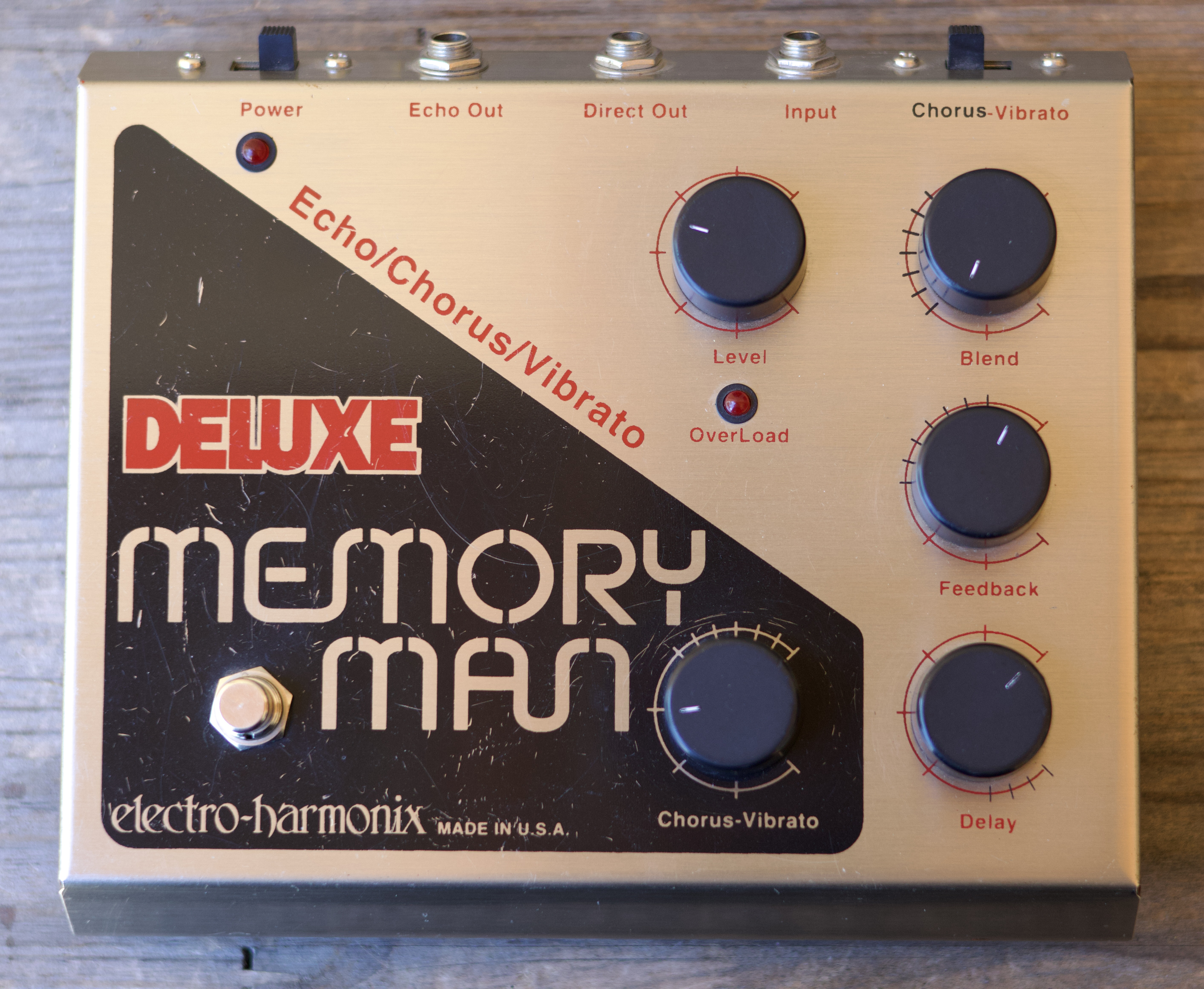
Deluxe Memory Man

Electro-Harmonix also manufactures delay pedals, including the Deluxe Memory Man, Stereo Memory Man with Hazarai, and #1 Echo. They also produce the '2880' pedal, which allows complex looping and multi-track overdubbing. The #1 Echo provides basic digital echo capability, while the Deluxe Memory Man provides more control over length, repeats, etc. The Deluxe Memory Man also includes built-in chorusing and vibrato effects. The digital Stereo Memory Man with Hazarai (distinct from the Analog Deluxe Memory Man) also includes reverse echo effect and looping/overdubbing. The Memory Toy and Memory Boy delay pedals are essentially smaller budget versions of the Deluxe Memory Man. The Memory Man effects pedal was used by Edge from the band U2 to record the songs "I Will Follow" and "Sunday Bloody Sunday". One of the singles from the band Deerhunter's 2010 album Halcyon Digest was named "Memory Boy".

=== Reverb ===
The Holy Grail, Holy Grail Plus, Holier Grail (discontinued), Holiest Grail (discontinued), Oceans 11, and Cathedral pedals produce reverberation. These cover a range of capability, including reverb length, room simulation, etc. The company's Holy Stain multi-effects pedal also includes two different types of reverb.

=== Tremolo and vibrato ===
Tremolo and vibrato are included as well, in both solid-state and vacuum tube options. These are available in the Stereo Pulsar (solid-state) and Wiggler (tube) pedals.

=== Octave, pitch and synthesizer ===
Also available are a series of pitch modulation pedals. These include the Micro Synthesizer (for bass or guitar), HOG (Harmonic Octave Generator), POG (Polyphonic Octave Generator, released in 2005), POG 2 (2009), Micro POG (in an XO casing), Nano POG, Octave Multiplexer, Pitch Fork, and Pitch Fork+.

The POG line of pedals has been used extensively by several prominent 2000s-era rock guitarists, including Jack White (of The White Stripes, The Raconteurs, et al.), and Josh Homme (of Queens of the Stone Age, Them Crooked Vultures, et al.).

=== Envelope, EQ and compression ===
Electro-Harmonix offers several pedals for envelope/equalization modulation. Amongst them are the Bassballs (appropriately named for its intended use with bass guitars), Doctor Q and the Q-Tron. Another pedal of note was the vacuum tube-powered Black Finger Compressor which adds distortion-free sustain to the sound and which appeared in the mid-1970s. The solid-state White Finger followed. In 2016, the Tone Corset was released as the latest analog compressor.

In 1995, Electro-Harmonix owner Mike Matthews commissioned Mike Beigel, former owner of Musitronics Corp. and inventor of the Mu-tron III envelope filter, to design a new envelope filter using the same analog circuitry as the original Mu-tron III, thus keeping the sound as close to the original as possible while adding new features to bring the effect into the new millennium. The pedal featured the same controls as the Mu-tron III and incorporated a "Boost" feature, which activates an internal pre-amp and changes the function of the gain knob giving the Q-Tron a sound almost identical to the Mu-tron III. Another feature added to Q-Tron was an effects loop switch and attack response switch. Units with these features are called the Q-Tron+. A smaller more compact version, the Mini Q-Tron, is also available, as well as an even smaller version, the Micro Q-Tron. Electro-Harmonix also currently produces the C0ck Fight a talking wah filter with fuzz and a modulated low-pass filter, the Blurst.

=== Other pedals ===
Electro-Harmonix currently manufactures over one hundred other pedals.

These include the Graphic Fuzz (a fuzzbox which includes an EQ section), the Octavix (octave fuzz), the Frequency Analyzer (which creates ring modulation) and the Voice Box, a vocoder. The Voice Box has been included in a series of demonstration videos produced by Jack Conte.

Electro-Harmonix has also made a few small power amp pedals for use as a simple guitar amplifier. The EHX 22 Caliber was a 22 watt solid state pedal capable of driving either an 8 ohm or 16 ohm speaker cabinet. It has been discontinued. The 22 Caliber was replaced in the lineup by the EHX 44 Magnum, a similar pedal capable of driving the same speaker load, but at a 44 watt output. The 5MM power amplifier, introduced in 2019, is a similar pedal, with a reduced output of 2.5 watts, but with the ability to run on a common 9-volt power supply, as opposed to the 24-volt supply needed to power the 44 Magnum.

2016, Electro-Harmonix reissued the MIG-50, a 50 watt tube amplifier head and later the 2x12 speaker cabinet.

Several pedals produced in the decades prior have also been discontinued, many of which are still in high demand for their unique sound.

=== Acoustic guitars ===
These guitars were only available from EH for a very short time in 1974. They were available through a special offer for $87.50 with the purchase of $50 or more in certain scratch-n-dent EH products. The list price was $187.50. These are the model names and descriptions: EH-7010 EH acoustic guitar (mahogany back and sides), EH-7020 EH acoustic guitar (D-28 copy, rosewood back and sides), and EH-7030 EH acoustic guitar (D-41 copy, rosewood back and sides, pearloid binding and inlay, 3 piece back). They bought them from Moridaira/ Morris Guitar who at the time were the best guitar maker in Japan, making guitars for Fender and many big companies. They put the EH on the guitars. The guitar, marked with the brand "Brody" is another Japanese-made acoustic that EH had made for them in the 70s. Mike Matthews has stated that Brody was his mother's maiden name. Unlike the other EH guitar, this one is of a lesser quality.

== Notable users ==
- Kurt Cobain: Big Muff, Echo Flanger, Small Clone, Stereo Polychorus
- Jamie Cook: Big Muff, Little Big Muff, Pulsar, HOG Foot Controller, Deluxe Memory Man, Holiest Grail
- Billy Corgan: Op-Amp Big Muff, Polyphase, Electric Mistress, Small Stone
- Chris Cornell: Deluxe Memory Man, Hog Guitar Synthesizer
- Brad Delson & Mike Shinoda: Polyphase, HOG, Holy Sustain, Memory Man, Cathedral
- The Edge: Deluxe Memory Man, Big Muff
- Flea: Big Muff, Q-Tron
- Nils Frahm: #1 Echo
- John Frusciante: Big Muff, Holy Grail Reverb, English Muff'n, Electric Mistress Flanger, POG
- Noel Gallagher: Micro POG
- David Gilmour: Big Muff, Electric Mistress
- Goodiepal:POG 2 Polyphonic Octave Generator
- Jonny Greenwood: Freeze, Polychorus, Small Stone
- Peter Hook: Clone Theory
- Jean-Michel Jarre: Small Stone, Electric Mistress
- Daniel Kessler: Holy Grail Reverb
- Andreas Kisser: Big Muff
- Alex Lifeson: Big Muff Pi, Electric Mistress, Memory Man
- Justin Lockey: Holy Grail Plus, Micro POG, Nano Double Muff
- Doug Martsch: Memory Boy, 16 Second Digital Delay
- J. Mascis: Ram's Head Big Muff, Deluxe Electric Mistress, POG 2 Polyphonic Octave Generator
- Mike McCready: Micro POG, POG 2 Polyphonic Octave
- Brian Molko: #1 Echo
- Mark Mothersbaugh: Frequency Analyzer
- Lockett Pundt: Big Muff, Little Big Muff, Classic Holy Grail Reverb
- Omar Rodríguez-López: Small Stone Phase Shifter, Deluxe Memory Man, Memory Boy, Poly Chorus, Holy Grail, Big Muff
- Kurt Rosenwinkel: HOG
- Kevin Shields: Big Muff Pi
- Robert Smith: Electric Mistress, Deluxe Memory Man
- Mark Speer: Holy Grail
- Andy Summers: Electric Mistress, Muff Fuzz
- Kim Thayil: Micro POG
- Alex Turner: Deluxe Memory Man
- Jeff Tuttle: Small Stone, Holy Grail, Small Clone, POG, Big Muff
- Jack White: Big Muff, Big Muff Pi with Tone Wicker, POG, Bassballs, Holy Grail Nano Reverb
- Thom Yorke: Holy Grail, Iron Lung Vocoder, 45000 Multi-Track Looping Recorder
- Stuart Braithwaite: Big Muff Pi, Green Russian Big Muff, Superego Synth Engine, V256 Vocoder
