= Sovtek =

Russian vacuum tube brand

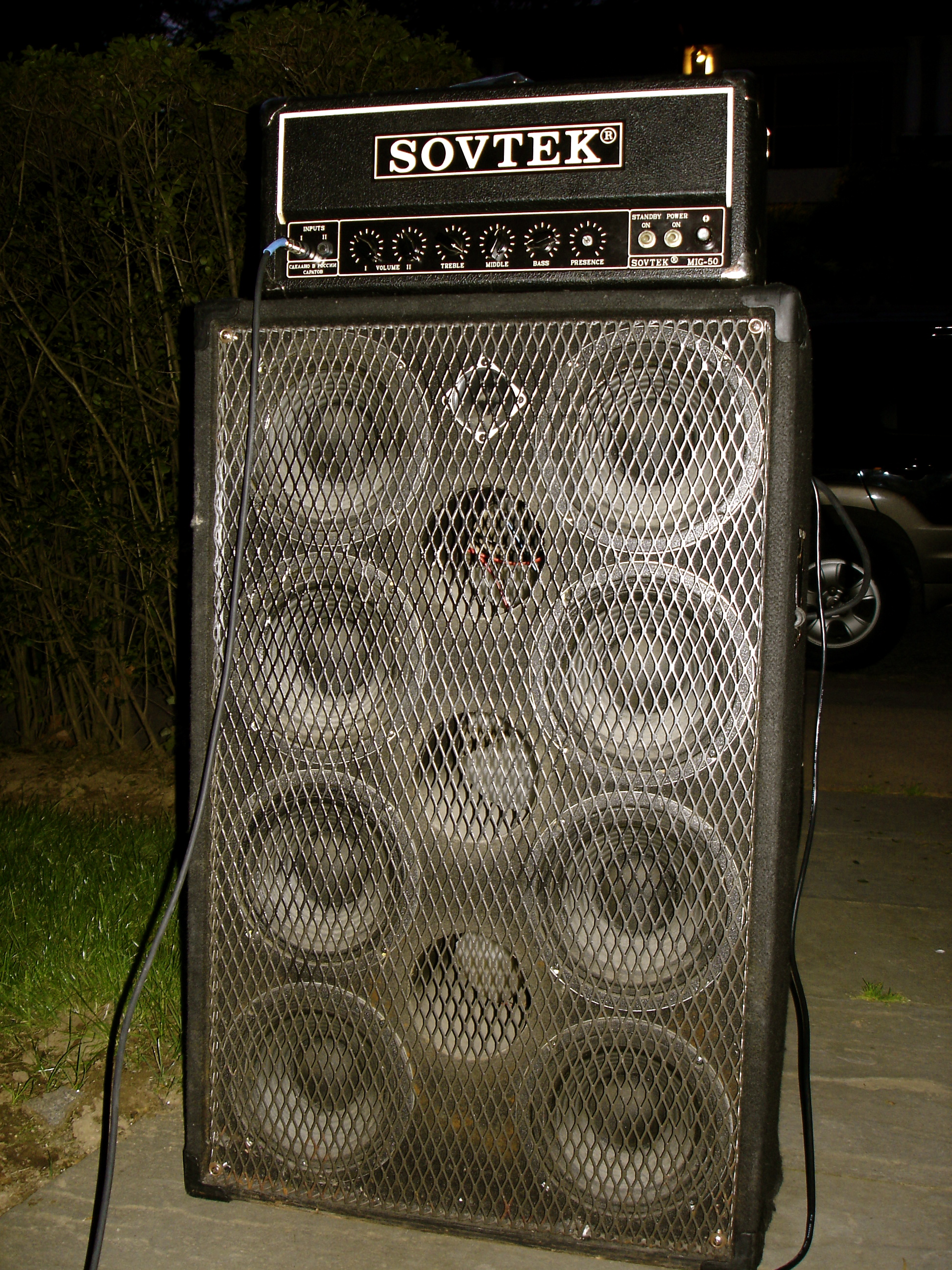
A Sovtek MIG-50 amplifier on top of an SWR Henry 8x8 speaker cabinet

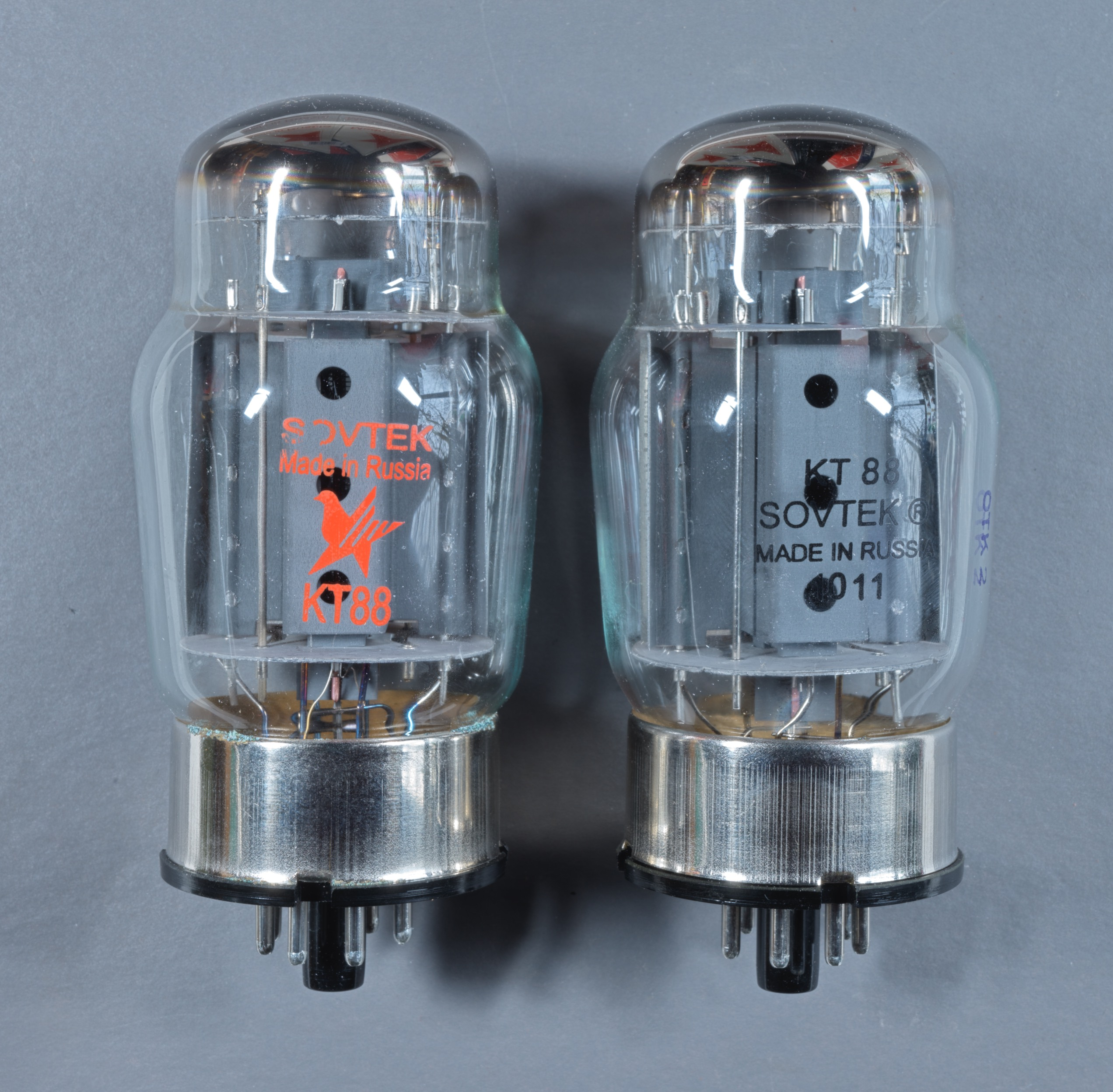
KT88 vacuum tubes made by Sovtek

Sovtek is a brand of vacuum tube owned by Mike Matthews's New Sensor Corporation and manufactured in Saratov, Russia. They are often used in guitar amplification and include versions of the popular 12AX7, EL84, EL34, and 6L6 vacuum tubes. Many of the vacuum-tube amplifiers in modern production are factory-fitted with Sovtek valves. Originally, Sovtek guitar amplifier valves were claimed to have been descendants of earlier wartime Russian-made components and carried blast proof capabilities. This, however, was later dispelled as urban myth, attributed to a sales person who promoted early product at music industry trade shows worldwide.

In the 1990s, Sovtek also manufactured tube amplifiers at factories in Saint Petersburg, Saratov, and Novosibirsk. Several models were offered for guitar and bass. Sovtek brand speaker cabinets fitted with U.S.-made Eminence speakers were also offered. At the same time, Sovtek manufactured variants of several effects pedals already manufactured in New York City by Electro-Harmonix, another company owned by Mike Matthews. Sovtek released versions of the Electro-Harmonix Big Muff and Small Stone pedals. Those pedals, along with the Bass Balls pedal, were later manufactured in both the U.S. and Russia, under the Electro-Harmonix name; manufacturing in Russia was later discontinued.

As of 2012 Sovtek was used only as a brand name for vacuum tubes distributed by the New Sensor Corporation.
