= Darkglass =

Finnish audio equipment manufacturer

Darkglass Electronics
- Founded: 2009; 17 years ago
- Founder: Douglas Castro, Hugo Villarroel
- Headquarters: Helsinki, Finland
- Products: Effects pedals, amplifiers, cabinets for bass guitar
- Website: www.darkglass.com

Darkglass Electronics is a Finnish manufacturer of effect pedals and amplifiers for bass guitar. The company was founded in 2009 in Helsinki by Chileans Douglas Castro and Hugo Villarroel, with Castro remaining in Finland as CEO and Villarroel returning to Chile and handling sales and artist relations. The company derived its name from the username Castro had previously used to upload his progressive metal recordings to online forums. Darkglass quickly became a prominent brand in the bass guitar equipment market behind an initial product line that focused on distortion pedals like the Microtubes B3K and Microtubes Vintage. In 2022, Darkglass was bought by Korg, while Castro left to focus on his amp modeling company Neural DSP.

== Products ==
Darkglass' earliest products consisted of multiple distortion pedals dedicated to bass guitar, including the Microtubes B3K, Microtubes Vintage, and Duality Dual Fuzz Engine. Made in Finland, the brand's pedals utilized innovative design concepts like CMOS-based clipping (as opposed to more typical diodes or LEDs) combined with a sleek design aesthetic. Further additions to the early product line included the Alpha Omega hybrid distortion/fuzz pedal and the Super Symmetry compressor. Darkglass subsequently began expanding their models' feature sets, such as the larger Microtubes B7K and Microtubes Vintage Deluxe. With their Ultra series, Darkglass released two-channel versions of their core distortion pedal lineup.

Darkglass entered the analog amplifier market with the Microtubes 500 and Infinity 500 models, and joined the digital boom with the Anagram floorboard amp modeler.

Neural DSP offers audio plug-ins based on Darkglass' pedals, first the Darkglass Ultra—based on the B7K Ultra and Vintage Ultra models—and then the Ultra's follow-up, Darkglass Ultimate, which adds various effects and cabinet simulations, alongside other production tools.
