= Amplifier modeling =

Emulation of an audio amplifier

Amplifier modeling is the use of solid state or digital signal processing technology to emulate the sound and functionality of traditional, typically vacuum tube-based, guitar amplifiers. Since the technology's inception, amplifier modelers have generally sought to give players access to a large collection of notable amplifier models at a much lower cost with greater convenience than buying real amps.

Modelers come in many formats, including desktop processors, rackmount units, floorboards, stompboxes, and audio plug-ins. Most emulate not only amplifier models, but speaker cabinets, microphones, and effects. Modelers became prominent in the 1990s with analog pedals like the Tech 21 Sansamp and digital processors like the Line 6 POD. In the 2000s, the Fractal Audio Axe-FX and Kemper Profiler established the viability of digital modeling for professional musicians. Further advancement of the technology and the introduction of lower-cost options has helped create a technological revolution in the industry and sparked a long-running debate over the merits of tube-based amplifiers compared to modelers.

== History ==
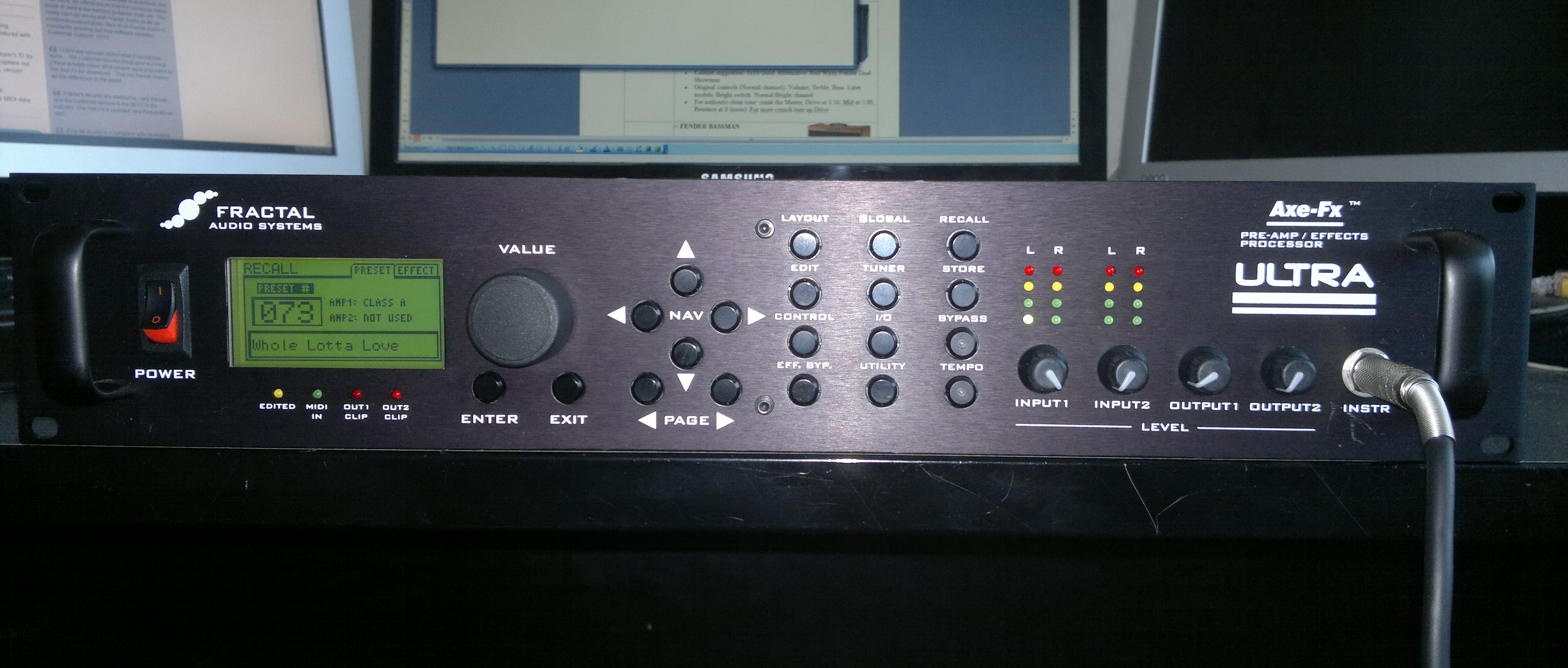
An Axe-FX Ultra

Modeling technology began as early as the 1970s with the 1979 introduction of PA:CE's Redmere Soloist combo amplifier, which had three analog channels, each emulating the sound of a Fender, Marshall, and Vox style of amp. In 1989, Tech 21 released its analog amplifier modeler, the SansAmp, which replicated the tones of Fender, Marshall, and Mesa/Boogie amplifiers and became popular among recording engineers and producers in the 1990s. Kurt Cobain notably used one as an overdrive pedal. Line 6 released its first digital modeling amplifier, the AxSys, in 1996, as a 2x12 combo. Johnson Amplification, a DigiTech subsidiary, also released digital modelers in combo format, but these all sold poorly. In 1997, Line 6 repurposed the AxSys technology as Amp Farm, a software plug-in for Pro Tools, and followed a year later with the desktop POD processor to much greater success, which helped spur wider interest in developing modeling technology.

These early modelers, however, were regarded by most as only home practice tools, but as processing power improved, so too did the realism of the modeled amps. In 2002, IK Multimedia released its AmpliTube amplifier and effects modeling platform, which played a major role in the development of audio plug-ins that create computer-based virtual amp and effects modeling suites. Fractal Audio's rackmount Axe-FX, released in 2006, became the first hardware modeler considered accurate enough for professional use. Although classified as an amplifier modeler, Fractal founder Cliff Chase has stated his priority with the Axe-FX was not exact emulation of classic guitar amps but rather recreating their sounds in the context of a modern device which emphasized expanded tonal control. The success of the Axe-FX sparked an "arms race" among rival amp modeler manufacturers to bring to market their own products with more advanced specs and build quality.

While modelers sought to replicate entire amplifier setups, Two Notes' rackmount Torpedo VB-101, released in 2010, kickstarted a trend of dedicated impulse response loader devices, which allow tube amp users to plug in for silent recording with digital emulations of speaker cabinets and microphones. The Kemper Profiler followed in 2011, pioneering "profiling", also known as "capturing", a technology that allows users to create and use digital versions of their own physical gear. While the Profiler "dropped like a bomb on the guitar universe", it and the Axe-FX were expensive. More affordable alternatives that followed included the Boss GT-1000 multi-effects processor, Line 6 Helix floorboards, and Yamaha THR "desktop" amp. Boss debuted its Katana line of analog-digital hybrid amplifiers in 2016, and it has since become the industry's bestselling amp line. Three years later, Fender entered the modeling amplifier market with their Tone Master series, which replaced the tube-driven circuits of classic Fender models with digital circuitry, but otherwise maintained the format and aesthetic of the original amps.

Modelers have become more compact and inexpensive as digital signal processing technology has progressed, with budget offerings from brands like Mooer, NUX, and Joyo. Positive Grid released its desktop Spark amplifier line in 2019 and it became the industry's most popular "smart" amp. Many brands now incorporate AI and machine learning into their products and design process. One such company, Neural DSP, established itself through audio plug-ins before releasing their first piece of hardware, the Quad Cortex, in 2020, to acclaim.

== Tube amplifier versus modeler debate ==
The success of digital modeling in an otherwise analog industry has led to a long-running debate over the merits of tube amplifiers compared to modelers. Tube amp players often appreciate the nostalgia of the technology and argue that analog amps and cabinets have a "soul" that cannot be replicated. These users point to modelers being unable to capture factors like the interaction between an amp and speaker cabinet or qualities like power amp sag and the physical "push" of air. Modeler fans argue that the portability, consistency, and reliability of modelers outweigh the "romance" of tube amplifiers and that advances like machine learning are increasingly able to capture non-linear amp behaviors like power amp sag and dynamic response. Guitar World wrote that "there's no doubt modeling amps are much more versatile, usable options for the vast majority of guitar players out there" and that modelers "sound every bit as good as a tube amp". Guitar World, however, also wrote that they did not believe tube amps "will ever truly go away." In 2025, Premier Guitar was critical of what they portrayed as an approaching saturation point with digital modelers, as the devaluation of DSP had led to more and more companies chasing ever-smaller margins of realism at the expense of developing products that inspire creativity.

In 2025, online marketplace Reverb.com noted that while traditional amplifiers outsold modelers overall by a 4-1 margin that year, the top-five bestselling amp models were all digital and no tube amps were in the top ten. Reverb concluded, "It's clear to see that modelers have won the battle."

== Types ==
=== Digital amp modelers ===
Digital amplifier modelers use a microprocessor to convert an analog guitar signal into a digital signal and manipulate it with a series of algorithms designed to mimic the sound of one or more traditional amps. The signal is then converted back to analog and sent to the output of the device. The amount of time this takes is known as latency. The term modeler typically refers to a hardware unit, while amp sim generally refers to the software, although the terms can be interchangeable. Many modelers include built-in effects, allowing a modeler to function as an "all-in-one" device, whereas multi-effect pedals may share a similar form factor to a modeler but only include effects. Modelers can be connected directly to PA systems or recording devices without the need for a power amp or speaker cabinet. If a player wishes to project the sound of their modeler, an FRFR (Full Range, Flat Response) speaker can be used. These speakers reproduce the full audio spectrum being played through them. Many modelers include MIDI control, allowing users to map out complex live sets.

Examples of modelers include the Neural DSP Quad Cortex, Fractal Axe-FX, Kemper Profiler, Line 6 Helix, IK Multimedia Tonex, and Fender Tone Master Pro.

=== Digital modeling amplifiers ===
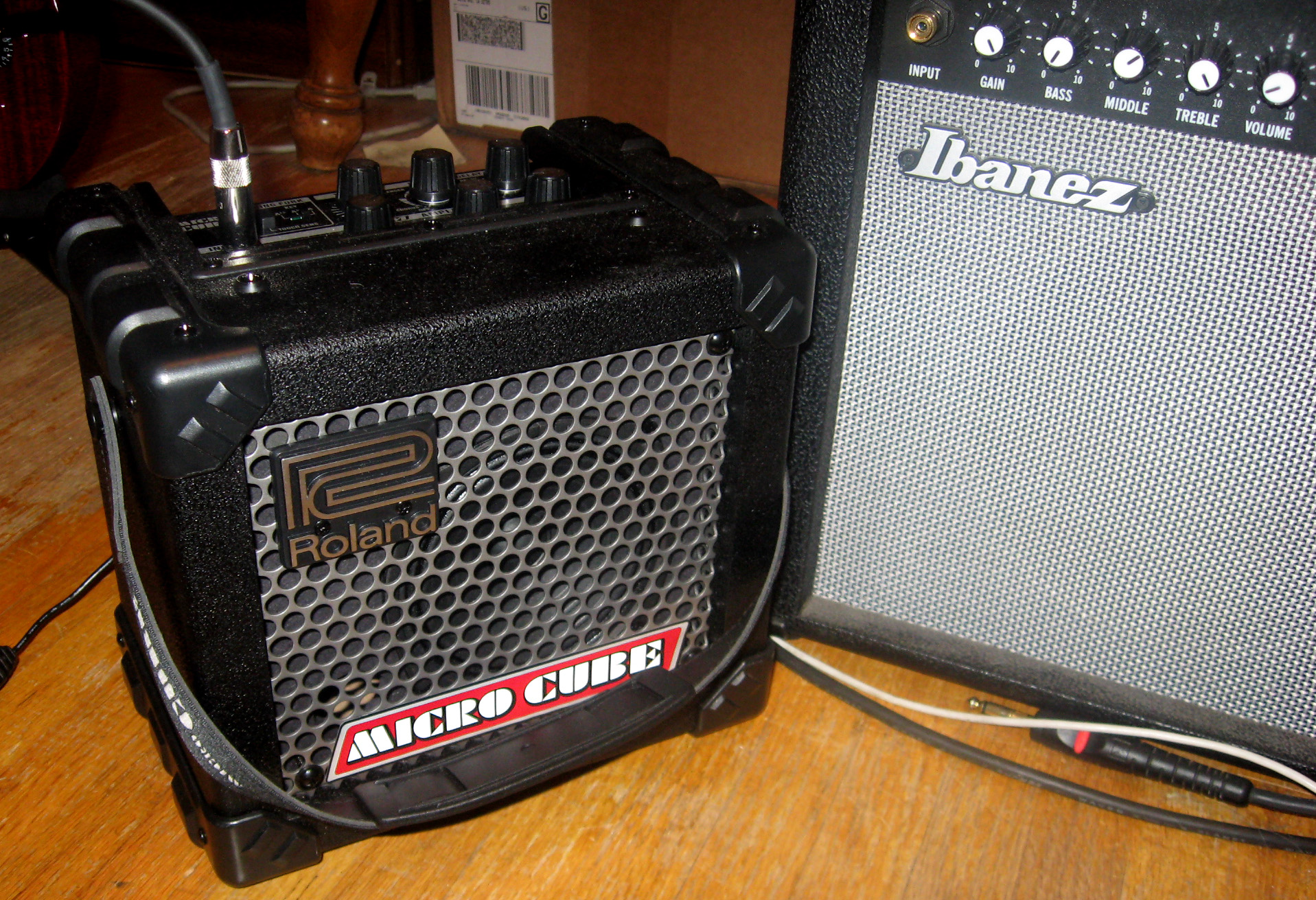
The Roland Micro Cube, left, a small and portable digital modeling amplifier.

Modeling amps such as the Peavey Vypyr, Roland Cube, Boss Katana, Fender Mustang, and Line 6 Spider series are amplifiers that include built-in modeling functionality. Some high-end modeling amplifiers, such as the Vox Valvetronix and the 60/120 watt versions of the Peavey Vypyr combine the digital modeling process with actual vacuum tube amplification.

=== Analog emulators ===
Analog modeling systems utilize analog circuitry in signal processing, such as filters, amplifiers, and waveshapers. Simple conceptual circuits mimicking a certain attribute have topologically evolved to become more and more complex in order to provide a more detailed or realistic emulation. Analog modelers include Tech 21's SansAmp line of products and the DSM Simplifier series.

== Notable products ==
- Boss Katana – a series of digital/analog hybrid modeling amplifiers with on-board effects
- Fractal Audio Axe-FX – a rackmount unit that combines amplifier modeling with speaker cabinet simulation and effects processing.
- Neural DSP Quad Cortex - a floor modeler for use with pre-programmed amp and effects models as well as plug-ins
- Kemper Profiler - a series of modelers that allow users to create digital profiles of their own amplifier gear
- Roland CUBE – a series of modeling amplifiers.
- Line 6 POD – a series of standalone modeling computers, some designed for digital recording and others for live performance
- Digitech RP series - Contains modeling computers for digital recording and live performance.
- GarageBand – a DAW that has an amplifier modeler built in
- Logic Pro - a DAW that has an amplifier modeler plugin
- Guitar Rig – Amplifier Emulation Software
