= Kemper Profiler =

Guitar amplifier modeler from Kemper

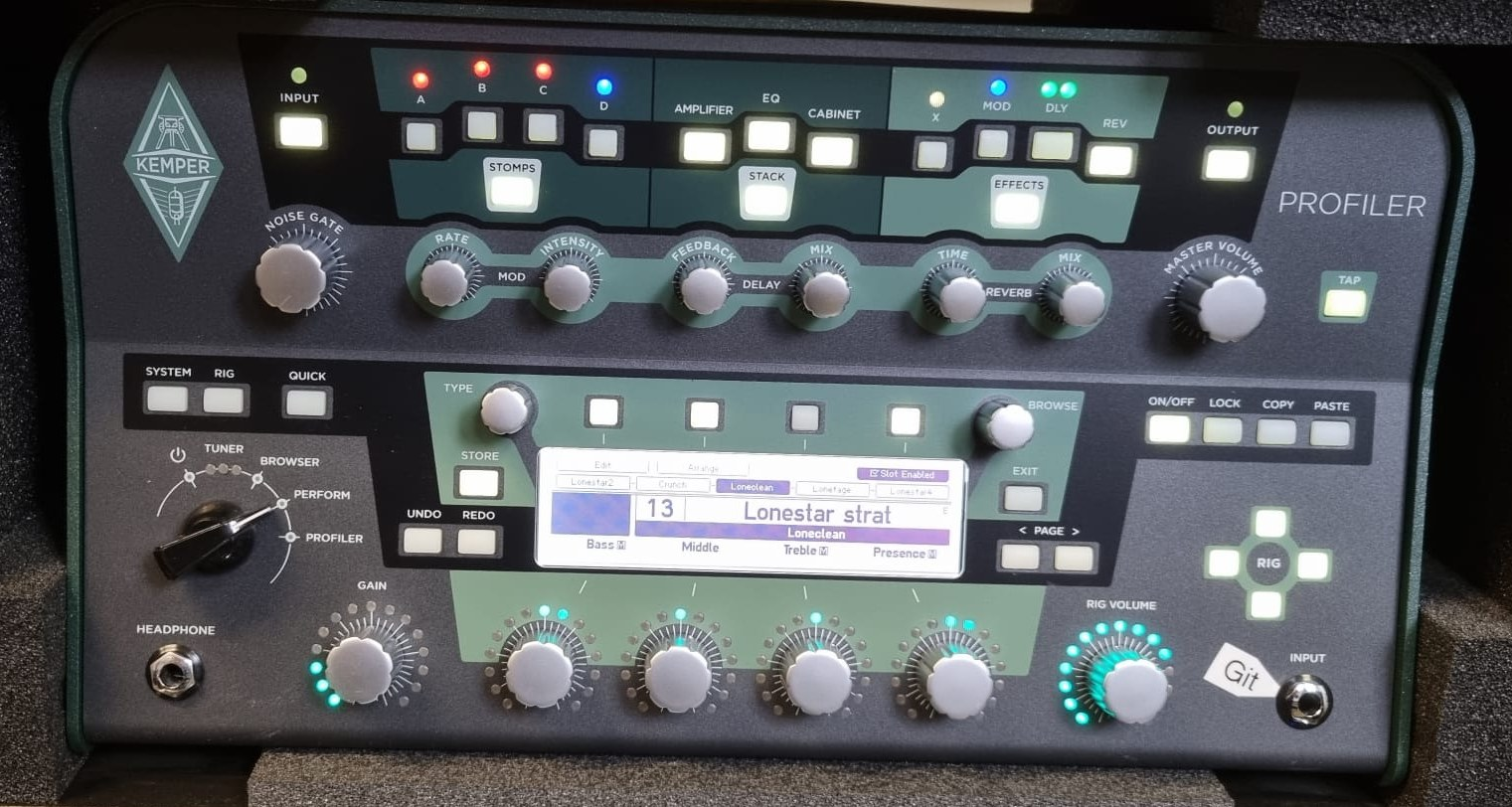
Kemper Profiler.

The Profiler is a digital amp modeling and multi-effects product line for electric guitar and bass from the German brand Kemper. Released in 2011, the original Profiler pioneered profiling, also known as capturing, a combination of hardware and software that allows users to create digital versions of their own amplifier, cabinet, and microphone setup, whereas traditional modelers offer only pre-programmed options.

== History ==
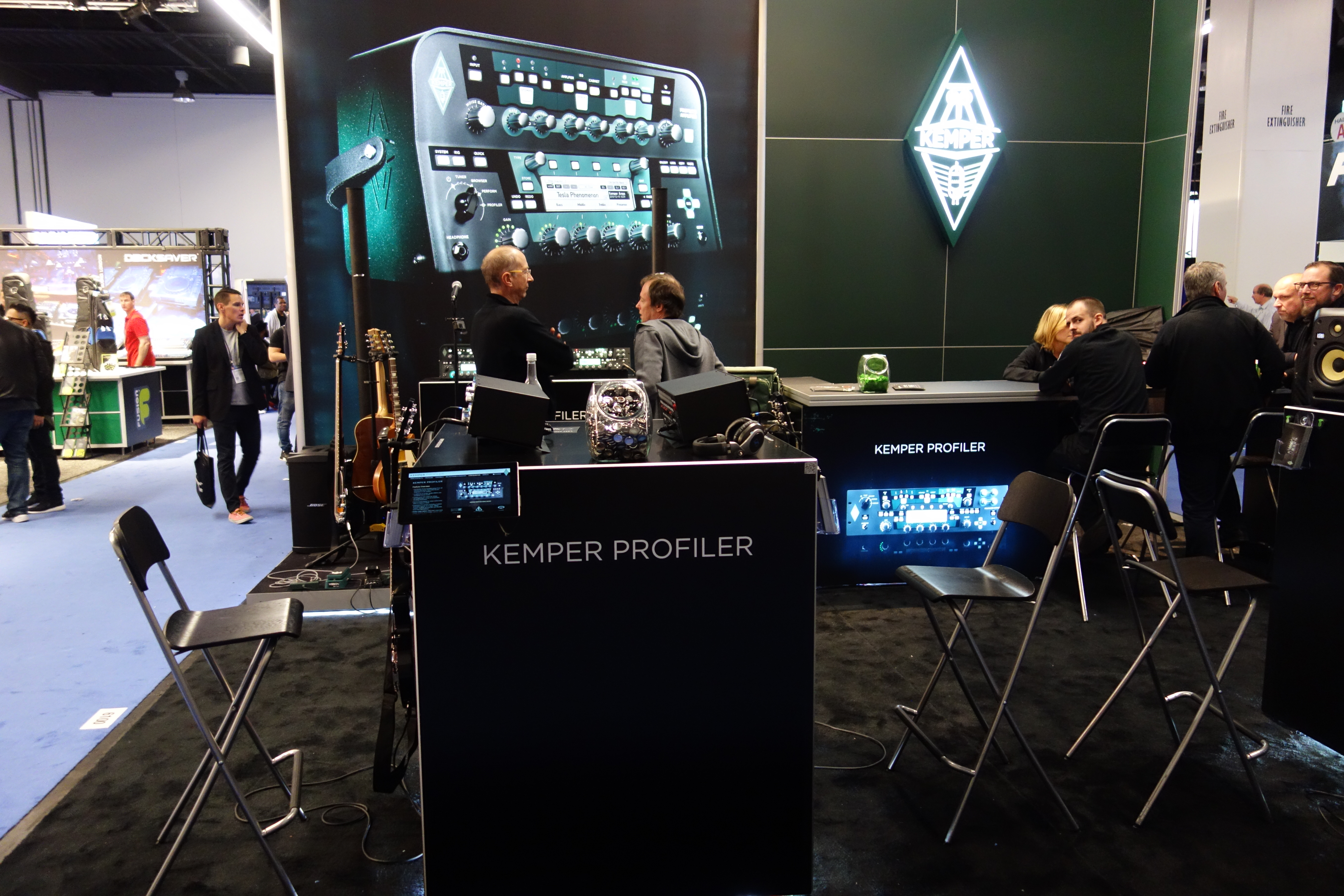
Kemper at Winter NAMM 2017.

Christoph Kemper, inventor of the Access Virus synthesizer, turned to developing guitar products in 2006. While digital modelers were already being produced by other companies, Kemper felt guitarists were not satisfied with the technology in a way that he could change. To this end, Kemper developed "profiling" technology: whereas traditional modelers offer users preprogrammed digital amplifier simulations, profilers instead give users the ability to create digital "snapshots" of their own amp, effects, and microphone setup, as well as share profiles with other users online.

The company debuted the Profiler at the 2011 NAMM Show. It came in both head and rack formats, with a floorboard known as the Profiler Remote to control it. The 600-watt Profiler is characterized by a green metal chassis with grey front panels and features a wide array of physical controls compared to traditional modelers. Guitar World later wrote that the Profiler had been polarizing upon its release, but that Kemper had significantly improved its software over time. Music Radar dubbed Kemper's profiling technology "game-changing" and added that the Profiler had become an industry standard, while Guitar World would include the Profiler in its 2025 list of the 50 greatest pieces of guitar gear of the century so far.

Kemper has expanded the Profiler line with multiple subsequent releases, such as the floorboard-format Profiler Stage, and stompbox-format Profiler Player. In 2025, Kemper announced that the entire Profiler product line would be updated with a "MK 2" series, which would include upgrades like a more powerful processing engine, a larger number of effects blocks that can be run simultaneously, and the use of lighter-weight aluminum components.

== Functionality ==
The Profiler works by sending white noise at different frequencies into the target amplifier's input—this white noise is designed to test aspects of the amp and its speaker cabinet—before it's fed back into the Profiler for analysis via a microphone placed against the cabinet and connected back to the Profiler. Once the basic profile is complete, a user can fine-tune it using the Profiler's control panel, with the ability to alter qualities like compression, power amp sag, and pick attack. This results in what Kemper describes as a "fingerprint" of the target amp. Profiles are saved on-board and can be combined with pre-programmed effects. For live use, the Profiler has both multiple XLR and 1/4" outputs, as well as MIDI and 1/4" jacks for use with foot controllers to switch between profiles.

A common criticism of Kemper's Profiler was that users needed multiple profiles of a given amp to account for different desired settings, as the Profiler's standardized EQ controls would not reflect the profiled amp's real world behavior when altering settings. Kemper addressed this in 2023 with the release of what the brand dubbed "Liquid Profiling", which allows users to combine a profile with any in a range of digitally modeled tone stacks based on real amps that will cause the profile's behavior to adapt as the real amp would when changing settings.

== See also ==
- Fractal Audio
- Line 6
- Neural DSP
