= Boss Corporation =

Japanese musical effects manufacturer

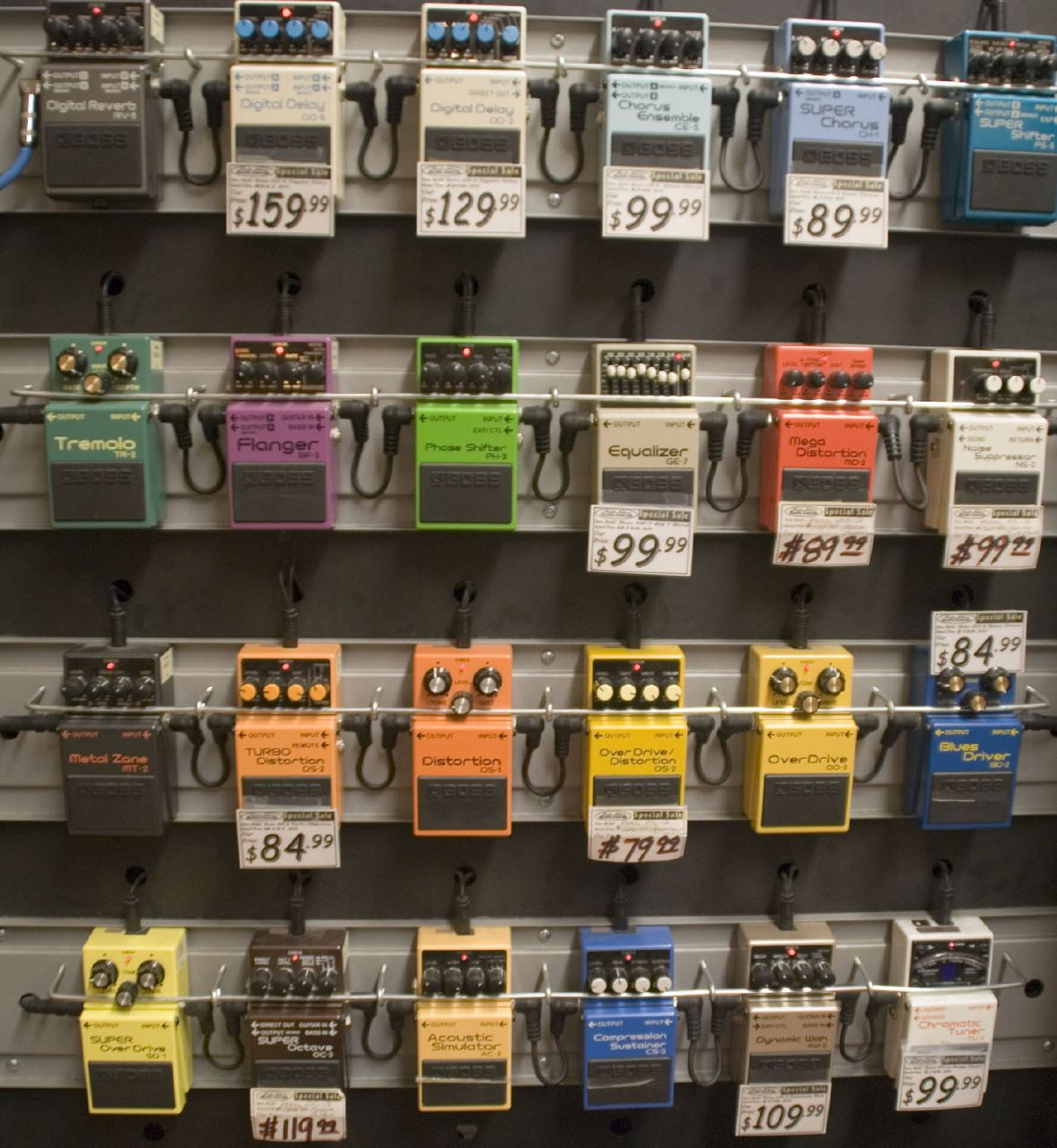
- Type: Private
- Industry: Musical instruments
- Founded: 13 March 1973; 53 years ago
- Headquarters: Hamamatsu, Japan
- Products: Effects units
- Parent: Roland Corporation
- Website: Boss.info/

Boss (stylized in all caps as BOSS) is a manufacturer of effects pedals for electric guitar and bass guitar. It is a division of the Roland Corporation, a Japanese manufacturer that specializes in musical equipment and accessories. For many years Boss has manufactured a wide range of products related to effects processing for guitars, including "compact" and "twin" effects pedals, multi-effect pedals, electronic tuners and pedal boards. In more recent times, Boss expanded their product range by including digital studios, rhythm machines, samplers and other electronic music equipment.

From the mid-2010's, Boss has also made digital signal processing (DSP)-based modeling amplifiers and speaker heads such as the Waza and the Katana. These digital products also feature multi-effects units emulating classic Boss effects pedals.

== History ==
The earliest Boss product was called B-100 The Boss, released in 1974. This came with a clip-on pre-amp and a pickup to amplify acoustic guitars. At this point the Boss company had not been formed and it was still a Beckmen Musical Instruments product (as seen on the B-100 box). The first proper Boss foot pedal effect, the CE-1 Chorus Ensemble, was released June 1976, which was a stand-alone unit of the chorus/vibrato circuit found in the Roland JC-120 amplifier. It was a fairly large, AC-powered unit. Other foot pedals of that year are the GE-10 (a graphic equalizer), the BF-1 (a flanger unit) and the DB-5 (a distortion unit).

Boss's line of compact pedals began in 1977 with the release of six pedals, all of them discontinued: an overdrive pedal (OD-1), a phaser pedal (PH-1), a parametric equalizer called the Spectrum (SP-1), a 6-band graphic equalizer (GE-6), a compressor pedal (CS-1) and an automatic wah pedal (TW-1). The Boss DS-1 was released the next year, in 1978. Their first compact chorus pedal (CE-2) came in 1979, and their first flanger pedal (BF-2) in 1980. In 1983 Boss released the DD-2 Digital Delay, the first mass-produced digital delay in a compact pedal format. The Metal Zone (MT-2) was released in 1991. In 1992 Boss released nine new pedals, including the Turbo Distortion (DS-2). The Heavy Metal (HM-2) distortion pedal was an integral part of the guitar sound of many styles of heavy metal music ever since. The pedals all share the same 'footprint', for compatibility with pedal boards.

Boss introduced COSM (Composite Object Sound Modeling), Roland's proprietary version of digital modeling technology, into their AC-3 Acoustic Simulator pedal in 2006. Boss has since released several pedals using COSM, including the FBM-1 '59 Fender Bassman pedal and FDR-1 '65 Fender Deluxe Reverb pedal, introduced at the Winter NAMM show in January 2007.

All Boss compact pedals use a "buffered bypass" type of silent foot switching utilizing Field Effect Transistors (FETs) to avoid clicks and pops. While not "true" bypass, the buffered bypass has the advantage of preventing signal loss due to long runs of cable, while keeping original guitar tone intact.

== Japan, Taiwan and Malaysia ==
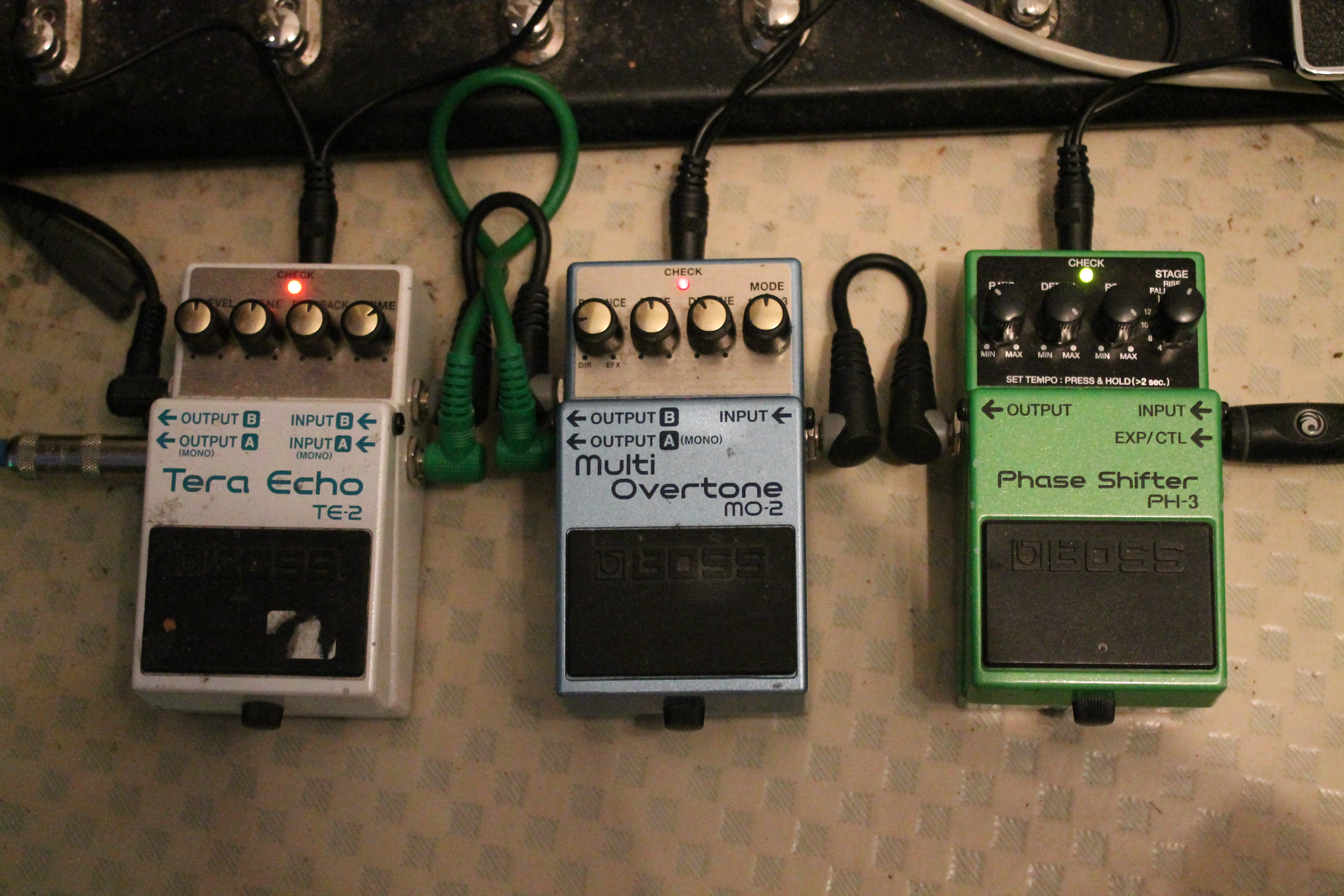
BOSS effect pedals

Boss compact pedals were originally produced in Japan, until circa 1990 when production moved to Taiwan. Earlier units came with a metal screw securing the battery compartment; later models retained the metal screw, adding a plastic knob for tool-less battery removal. The labels on the bottom of the pedals come in several different colours including black, silver, green, pink and blue. Apart from this the basic external design has remained unchanged for almost half a century.

The DS-1 Distortion circuit design has changed significantly twice throughout its lifetime; the first time was around 1994 when the Toshiba TA7136AP op-amp was replaced with a Rohm BA728N. In 2000 the op-amp was again changed. This time it was replaced with the Mitsubishi M5223AL. The latest op-amp change occurred in 2007, when new DS-1 pedals began shipping with the NJM3404AL op-amp.

In 2014, Boss released the Japanese-made "Waza-Craft" line of premium pedals, built with higher-end components featuring reissues of highly sought after vintage Boss effects such as the DM-2W Analog Delay, CE-2W Analog Chorus and DC-2W Dimension C. "Waza" means "art" and "technique" in Japanese.

In 2017 Boss released the 500 series pedals as their flagship design, complete with digital display and preset banks, similar to the design of Strymon pedals featuring presets, programmable algorithms and customizable midi options.

In 2019, Boss discontinued the twin format 20 series pedals and replaced the line with the 200 series.

As of 2019 around the launch of the DD3T and DD8 Digital Delays, Boss moved production from Taiwan to Malaysia. The Malaysian black label on the bottom looks similar to the modern era Taiwan label, verifying the new location of manufacturing.

== Notable pedals ==
=== BD-2 Blues Driver ===
In 1995, Boss released the BD-2, an overdrive pedal aimed at blues players who sought to add distortion while maintaining their amp's signal clarity and dynamics. At the time, blues was experiencing a resurgence thanks to Eric Clapton and Gary Moore. The pedal has a clear, punchy tone and features a flatter EQ-curve for a more amp-like tone than similar pedals, like the Ibanez Tube Screamer.

Notable players who use the BD-2 include Tom Morello of Rage Against the Machine and Billie Joe Armstrong of Green Day.

=== CE-1 and CE-2 Chorus Ensemble ===
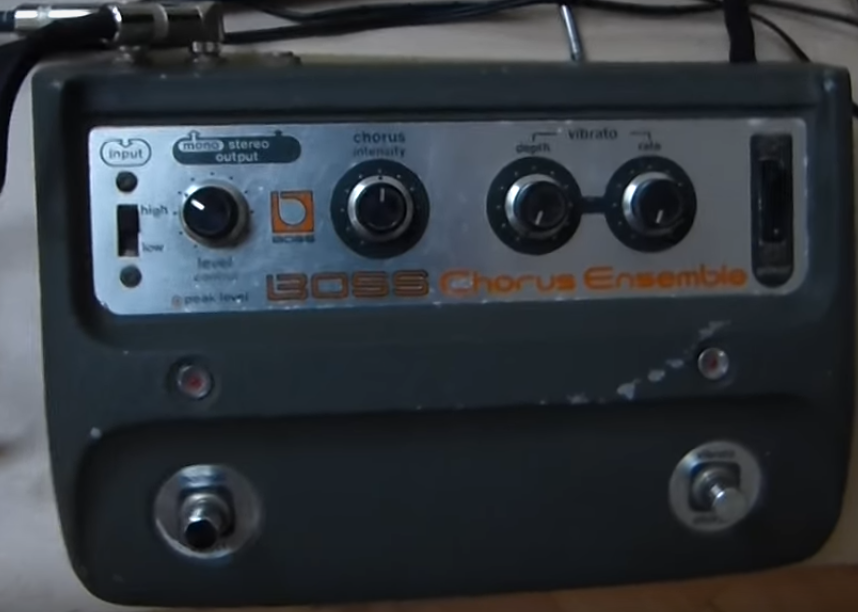
Boss CE-1 Chorus Ensemble

Boss released its first pedal, the CE-1, in 1975 after the "chorus" effect proved popular among guitarists with its use in the JC-120 and JC-60 Jazz Chorus amplifiers, released by Boss's parent company, the Roland Corporation. The pedal was housed in a large enclosure, typical for effects at the time, and featured two footswitches for on/off and to toggle between the unit's vibrato and chorus effects. The pedal worked in mono and stereo, and its "thick, spatial, and multidimensional" quality inspired numerous other companies to copy the pedal. Andy Summers of The Police was a notable fan, using the CE-1 on songs like "Message in a Bottle" and "Don't Stand So Close To Me."

With the introduction of Boss's compact pedal format in 1977, the CE-1 was replaced by the CE-2 in 1979. The CE-2 was an immediate success for Boss: it was affordable, sturdy, and had simple controls ("Rate" and "Depth"). It produced a gentle "warbling" effect—even with the controls maxed—and did not reduce midrange frequencies, whereas other brands' chorus pedals typically created a "woozy and weird" effect and reduced midrange, which meant these other choruses could be difficult to hear in denser mixes. Chorus became the defining guitar effect of the 1980s, in large part due to the CE-2. Fans included David Gilmour and Johnny Marr.

=== DD-3 Digital Delay ===
In the early '80s, Boss was able to fit the circuitry of its best-selling SDE-3000 digital rack delay into the form factor of its analog DM-2 delay, branded as the DD-2 digital delay. A subsequent drop in component costs allowed the pedal to be sold for a lower price in 1986 as the rebranded DD-3, which has gone through three distinct versions, with latest still in production. Music Radar dubbed the DD-3 the "gold standard" in compact digital delays and fans include Radiohead, Blur, and The Cult.

=== DS-1 Distortion ===
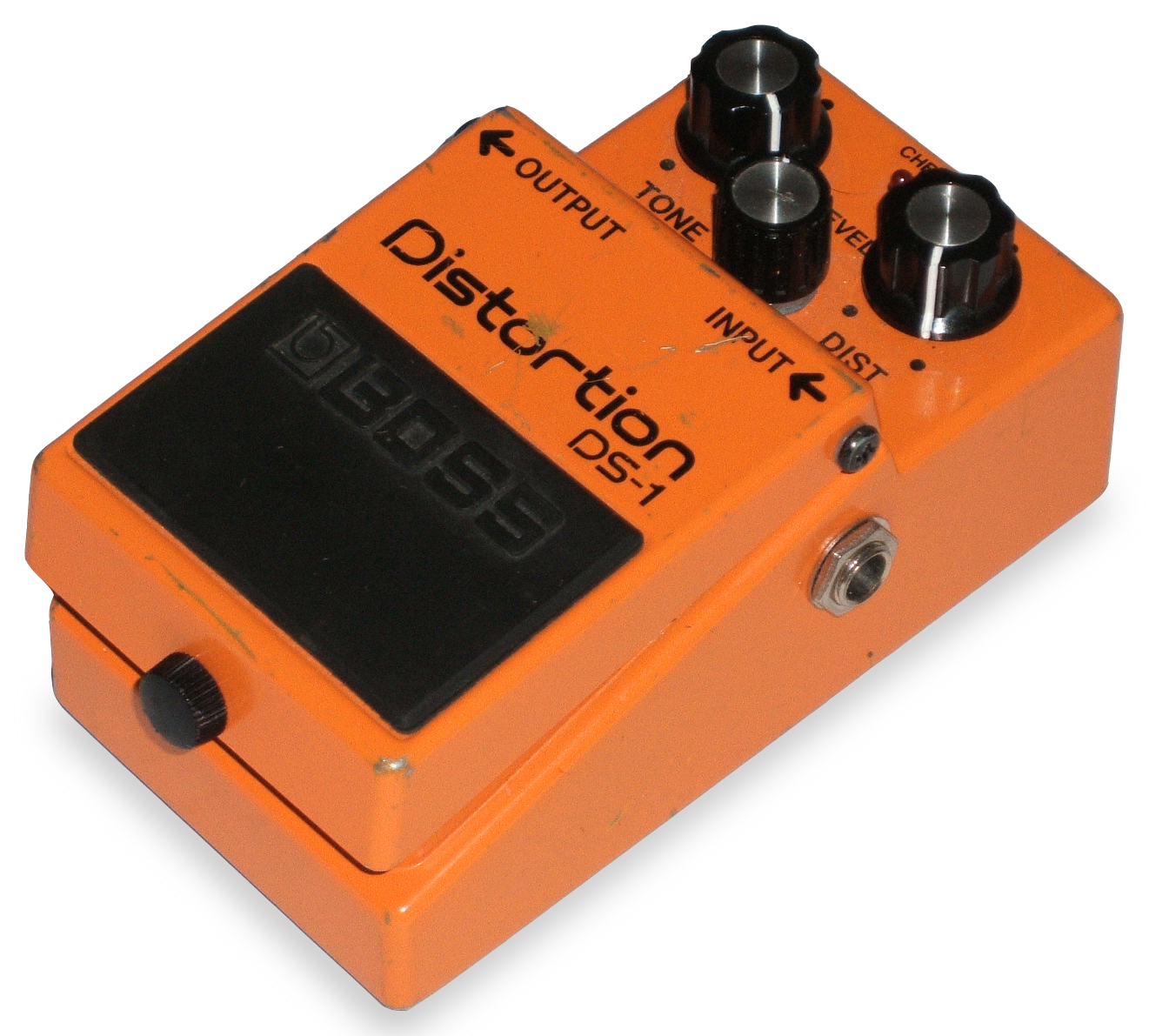
Boss DS-1 Distortion

Introduced in 1978, the DS-1 was Boss's first distortion pedal, and second pedal release overall, following the CE-1 Chorus Ensemble. The DS-1 uses two hard-clipping diodes for an aggressive edge, similar to the ProCo Rat, released the same year. This type of circuit became known as "distortion," as opposed to the soft-clipping "overdrive" of Boss's later overdrive pedals. The DS-1 uses a preamplifier instead of the conventional op-amp for a gritty, warm tone. When the original Toshiba TA7136AP preamp became scarce, the circuit was redesigned in 1994, introducing several "quirks"—lower volume levels, noise at higher gain levels, and a "waspy" edge due to higher frequencies not being filtered out. These issues led to the pedal being popular among modifiers.

The DS-1 is Boss's bestselling pedal.

=== MT-2 Metal Zone ===
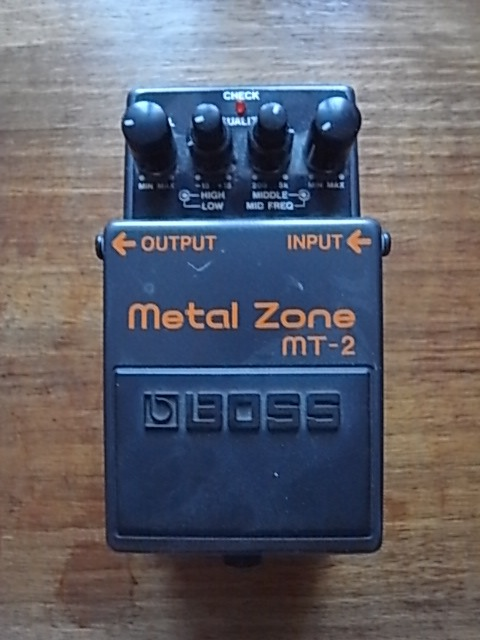
Boss MT-2 Metal Zone, one of the most popular metal distortion pedals

The Metal Zone was released in 1991, following the discontinuation of the earlier HM-2 Heavy Metal, which failed to sell well during its production run, but was popular among death metal players, since amplifiers of the time were not capable of the amount of distortion players wanted without being boosted with a pedal. With the MT-2, Boss sought to appeal to that market with an improved pedal as death metal's popularity surged. The MT-2 sported a complex design for a distortion pedal, with a dual-stage gain circuit, seven filters for both pre- and post-distortion, and a semi-parametric three-band EQ section. The pedal's thick, saturated, tight tone and the extreme sounds the pedal was able to produce thanks to its powerful EQ controls made the MT-2 divisive both upon its release and throughout its ongoing production. Guitar World characterized the general reaction to the pedal as "inspiring or confusing," and the pedal is often lampooned on the internet as the worst distortion ever made. Many in the metal community embraced the sound, however, with Nathan Weaver of Wolves in the Throne Room favorably describing the MT-2 as a "fucked-up, corpse-grinding type sound." Despite this, the pedal has found fans like Prince when used on lower gain settings or as a boost.

The Metal Zone has sold over a million units, making it the company's best-selling pedal behind only the DS-1. In 2021, Boss released a grey-on-black variant, the MT-2-3A, celebrating the pedal's 30 years in production.

=== OD-1 Overdrive ===
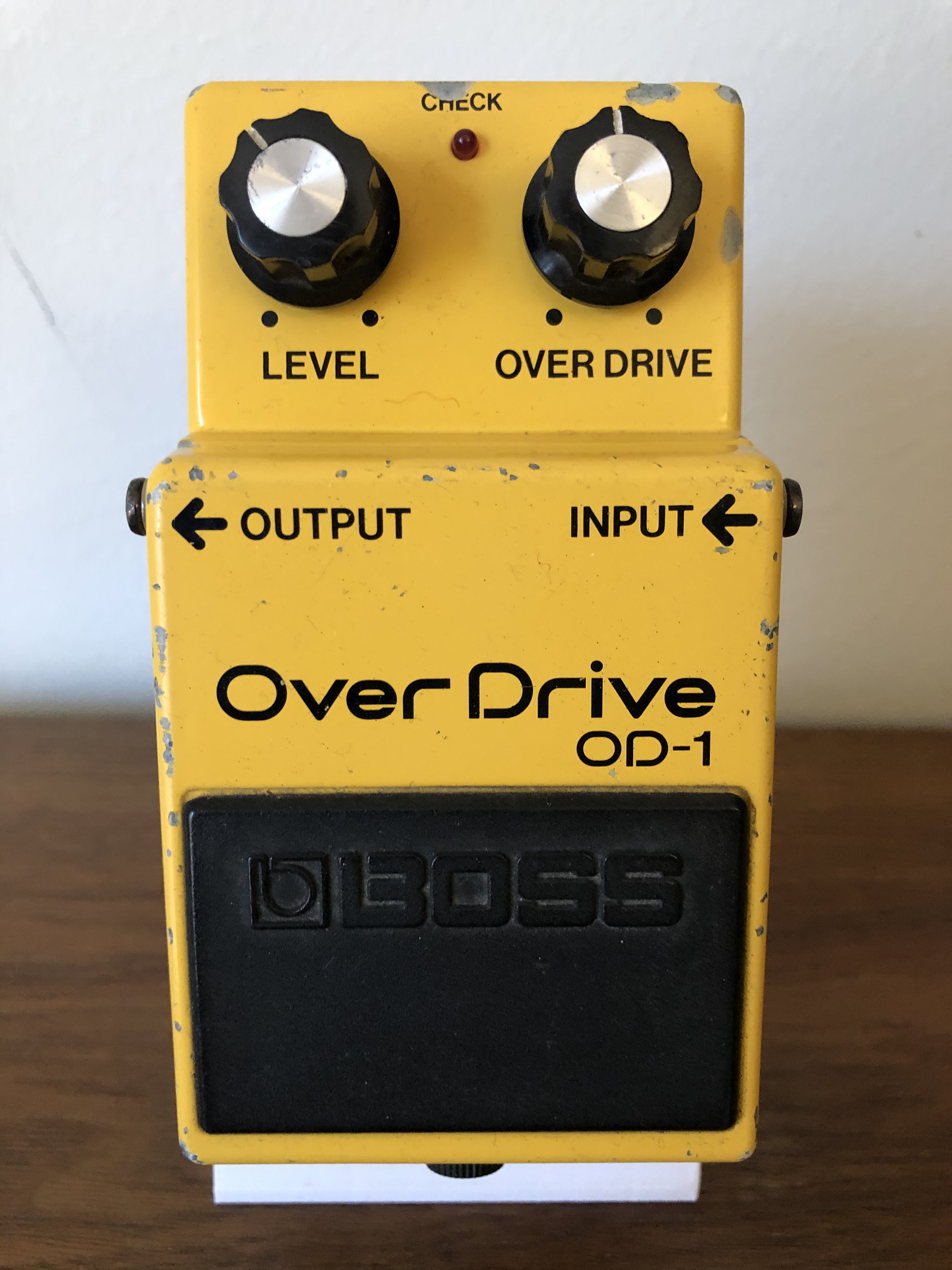
Boss OD-1 Overdrive

With the 1977 release of the OD-1 Overdrive, Boss coined the term "overdrive," a reference to the pedal's asymmetrical-clipping, tube-like distortion in comparison to the brash sound of "fuzz" pedals available. The OD-1's layout was simple—with only "Level" and "Overdrive" controls. The OD-1 was an immediate success, as the pedal afforded players more amp-like distortion at lower volume levels no matter what amp was being used. Within a few years, however, the pedal's voicing was considered overly "sweet" as rock music became more aggressive and the fixed frequency limited its versatility. With the surging popularity of the OD-1-influenced Ibanez Tube Screamer and its addition of a tone control, Boss began including a "Tone" knob on its pedals with the 1981 SD-1 and the OD-1 was discontinued in 1985.

Boss continued the Overdrive line with the four-knob OD-2 Turbo Overdrive, produced from 1985 to 1995, and subsequently the three-knob OD-3, which is still in production.

=== SD-1 Super Overdrive ===
The Super Overdrive was released in 1981 as Boss's second overdrive pedal, adding a tone control to the earlier OD-1 design, while continuing to replicate the sound of tube amp-style overdrive via an asymmetrical clipping circuit and an inherent midrange-focus, but with less bass roll-off. The asymmetrical clipping lent the pedal a more aggressive character compared to the rival Tube Screamer, and it became popular in the growing hard rock and heavy metal subgenres with guitarists frequently using it to boost already-overdriven amplifiers like the Marshall JCM800 into higher-gain sounds.

The SD-1 has long been popular as an affordable pedal for new players, as well as professionals. Notable fans include Jimmy Page, John Frusciante, Josh Homme, Jonny Greenwood, David Gilmour, Joe Satriani, Zakk Wylde, The Edge, and Prince.

In 2021, Boss released a 40th anniversary edition of the pedal, with the original circuit having remained unchanged since its introduction. Guitar dubbed the pedal one of only a handful to ever achieve "truly iconic status."

== Gallery ==
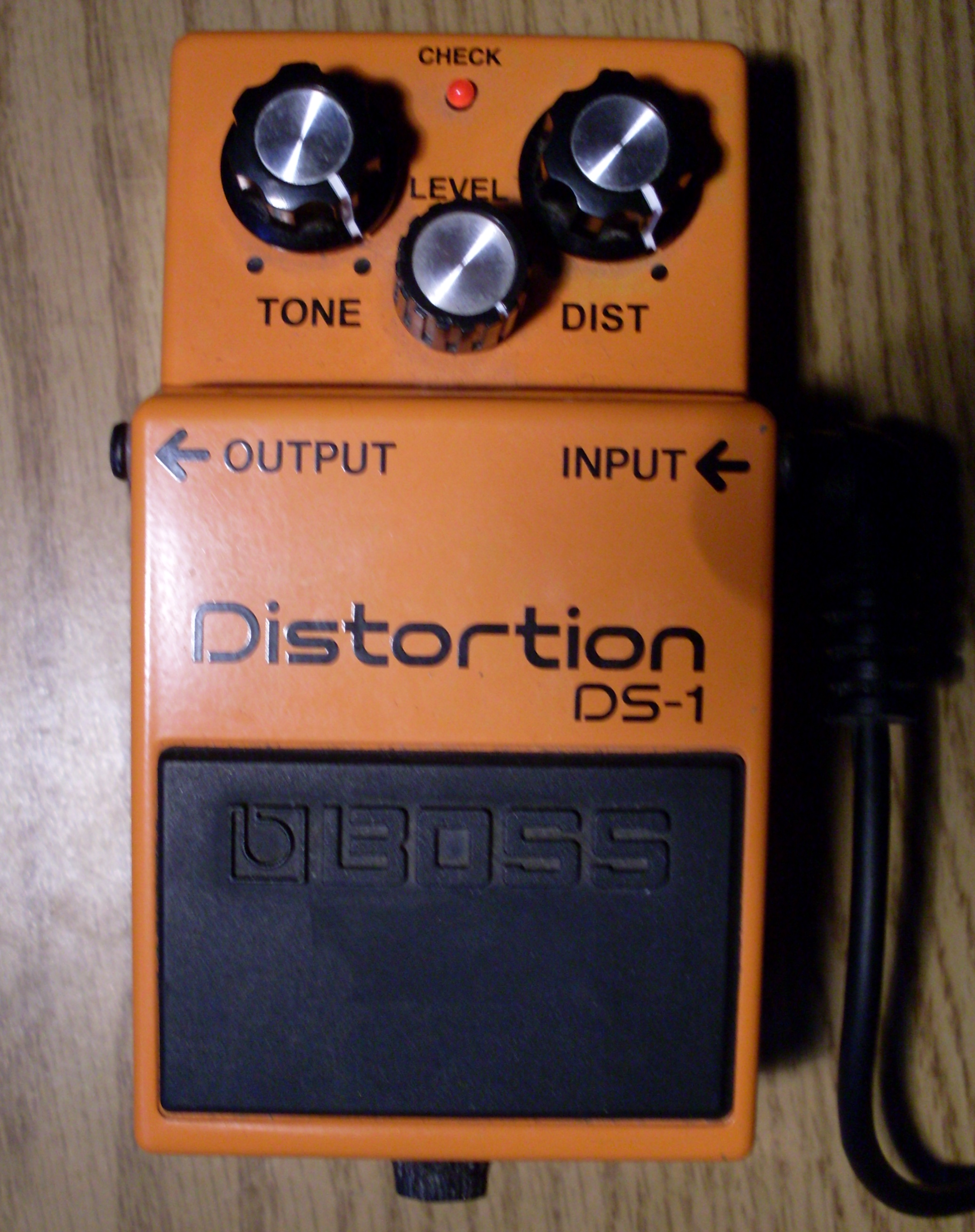
DS-1 Distortion

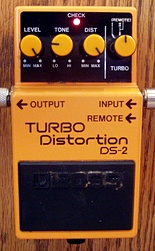
DS-2 Turbo Distortion

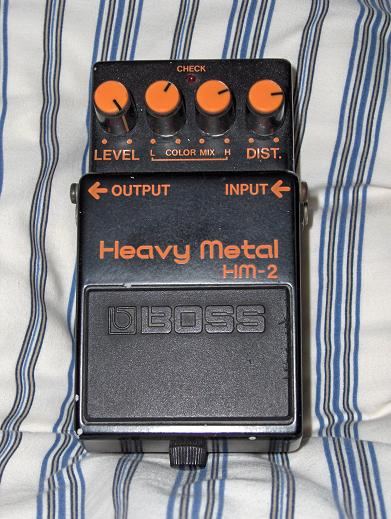
HM-2 Heavy Metal

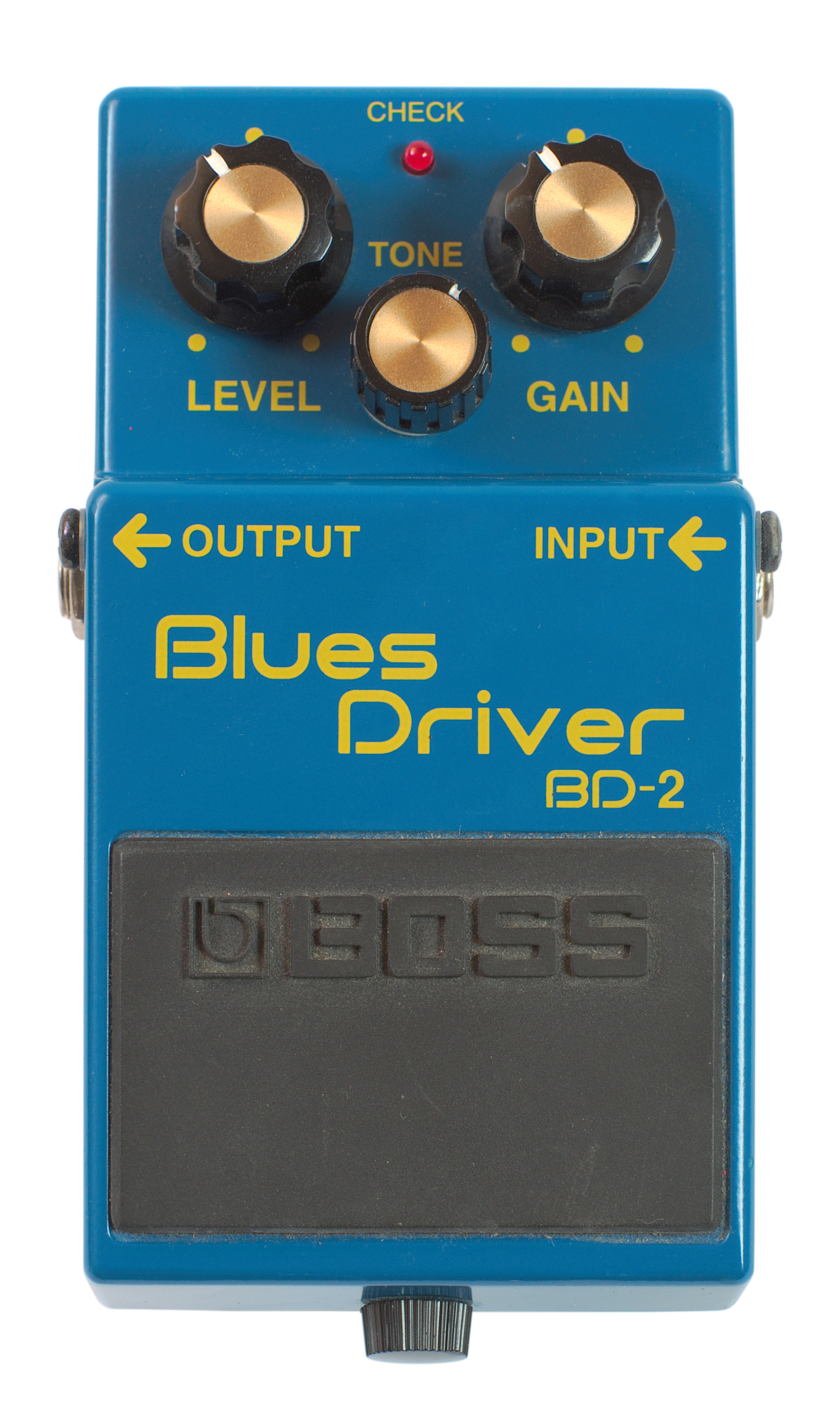
BD-2 Blues Driver

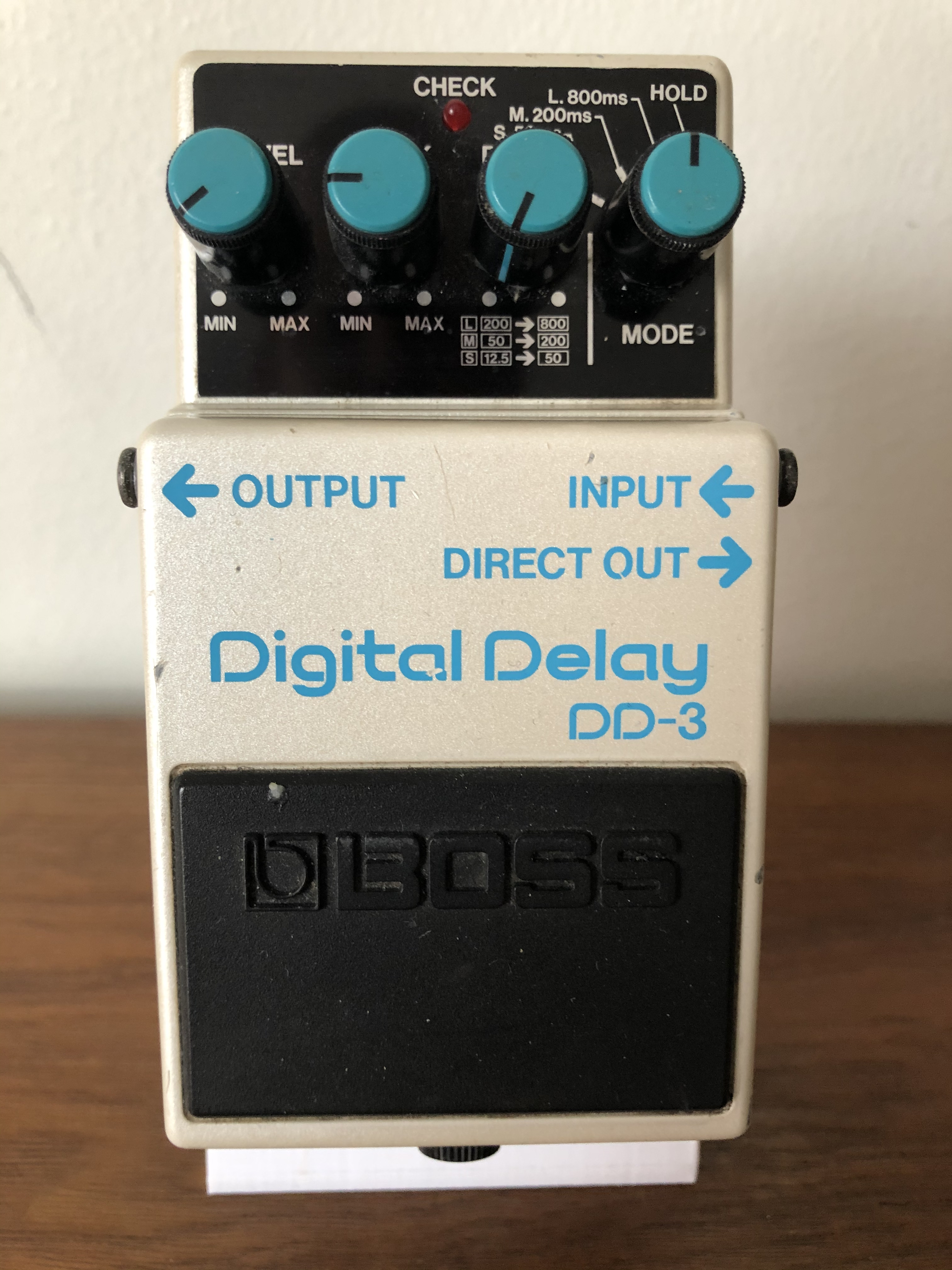
Boss DD-3 Digital Delay

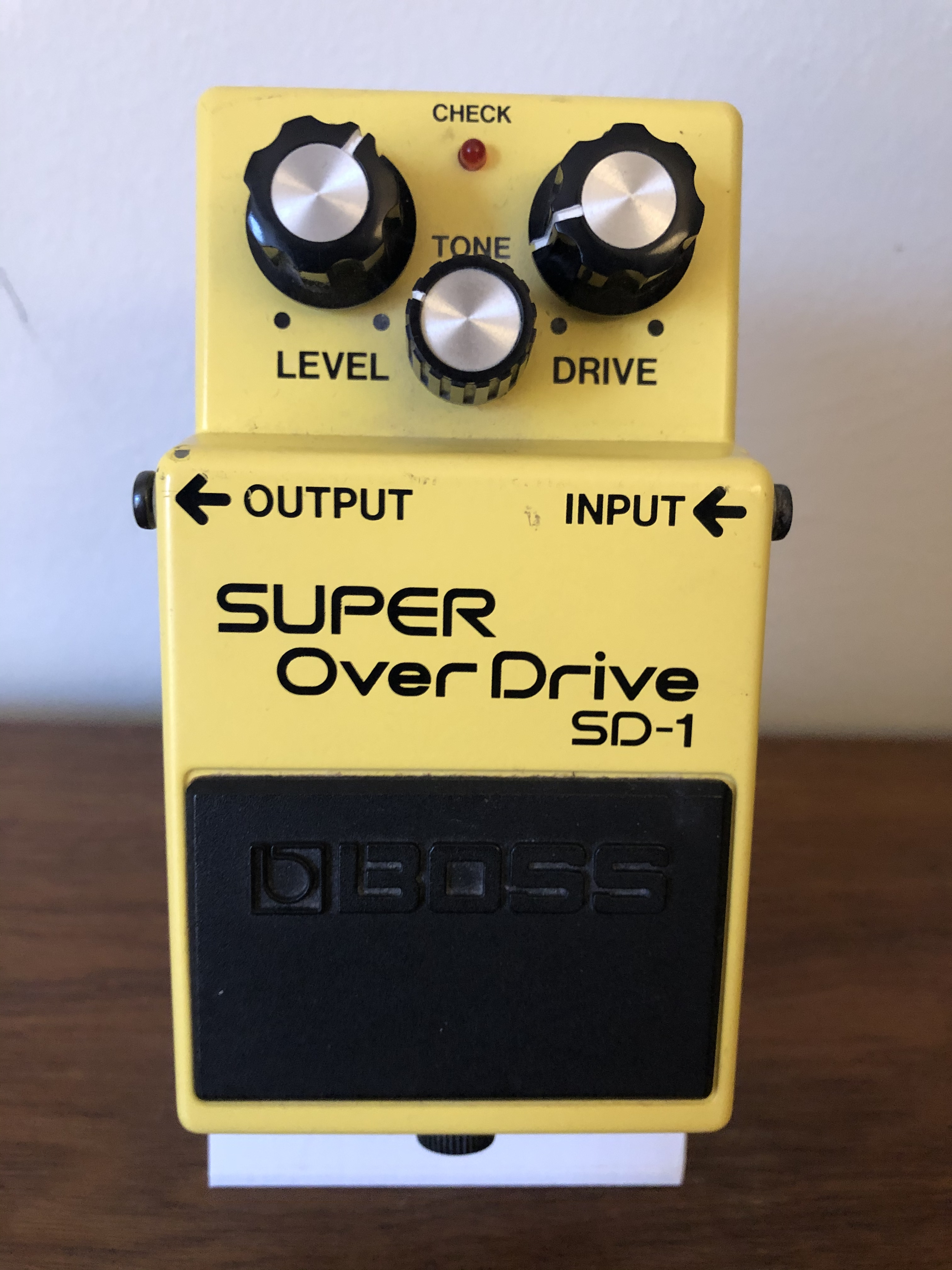
SD-1 Super OverDrive

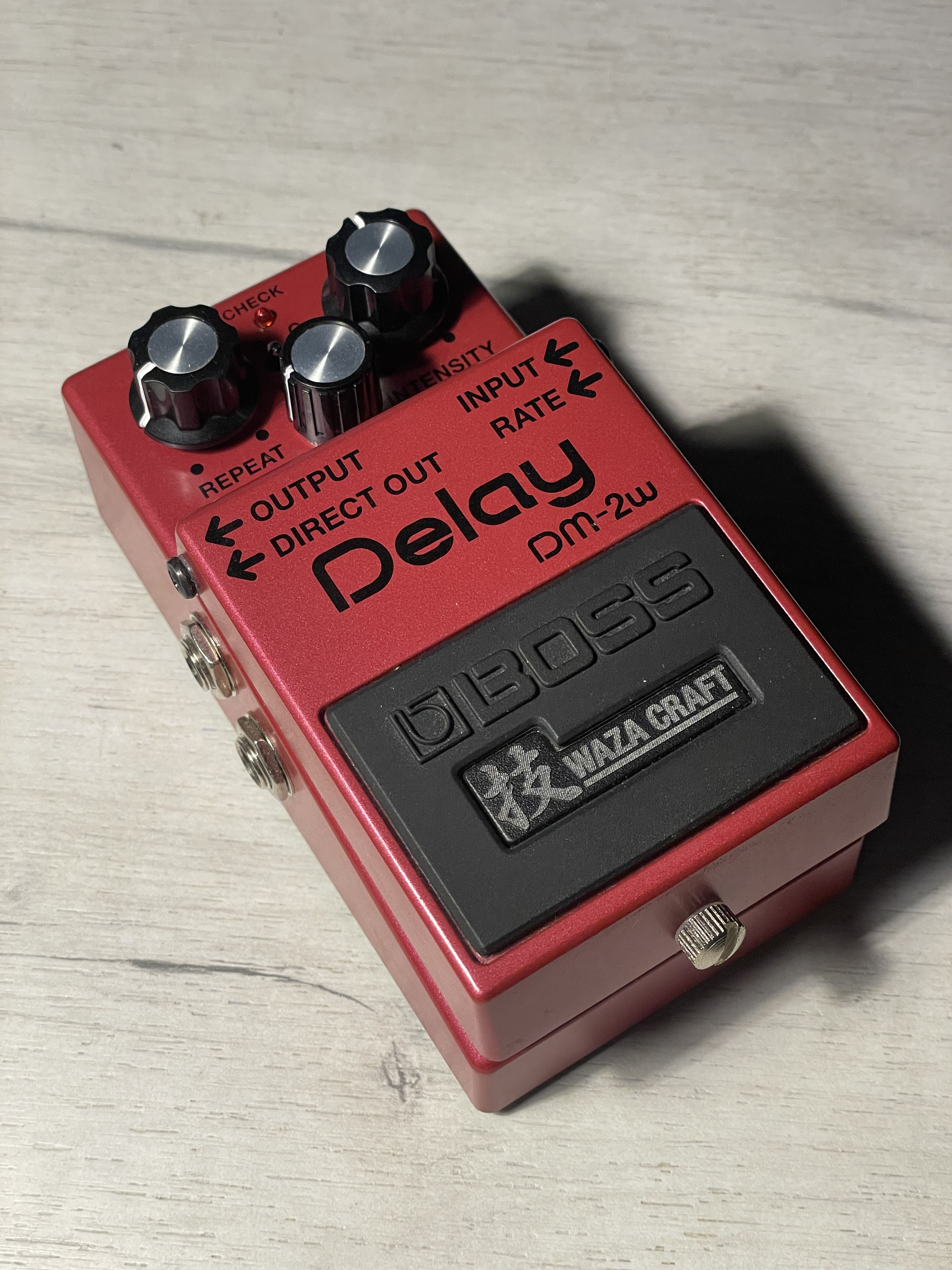
DM-2W Delay Waza Craft

== See also ==
- List of distortion pedals
