= Fractal Audio Systems =

American audio equipment manufacturer

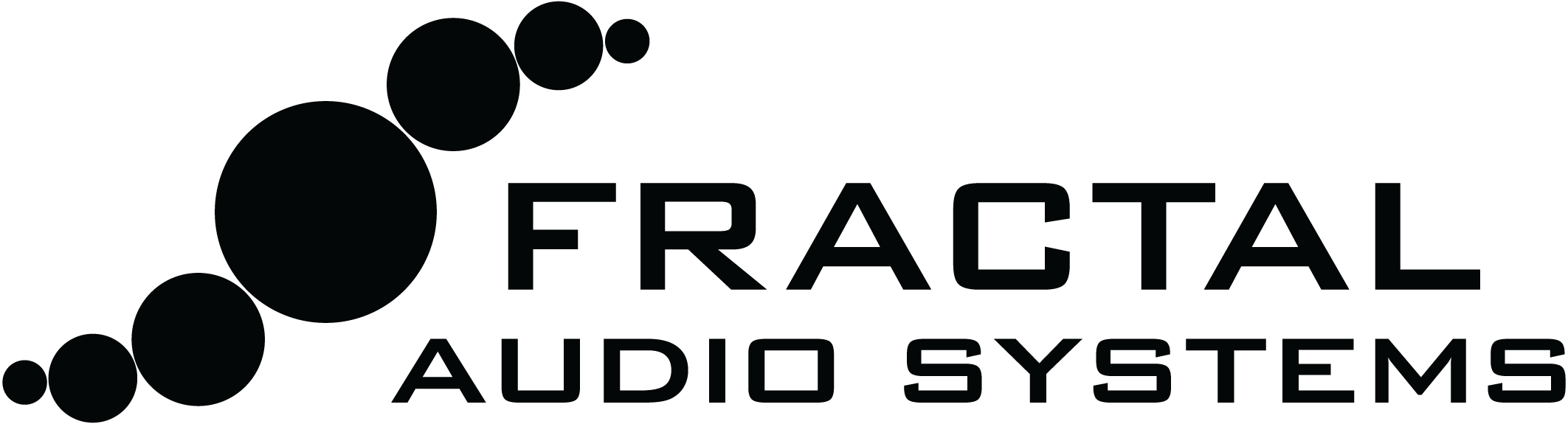
- Industry: Guitar amplification
- Founded: 2006; 20 years ago
- Founder: Cliff Chase
- Headquarters: Plaistow, New Hampshire, United States
- Products: Digital amplifier modelers
- Website: fractalaudio.com

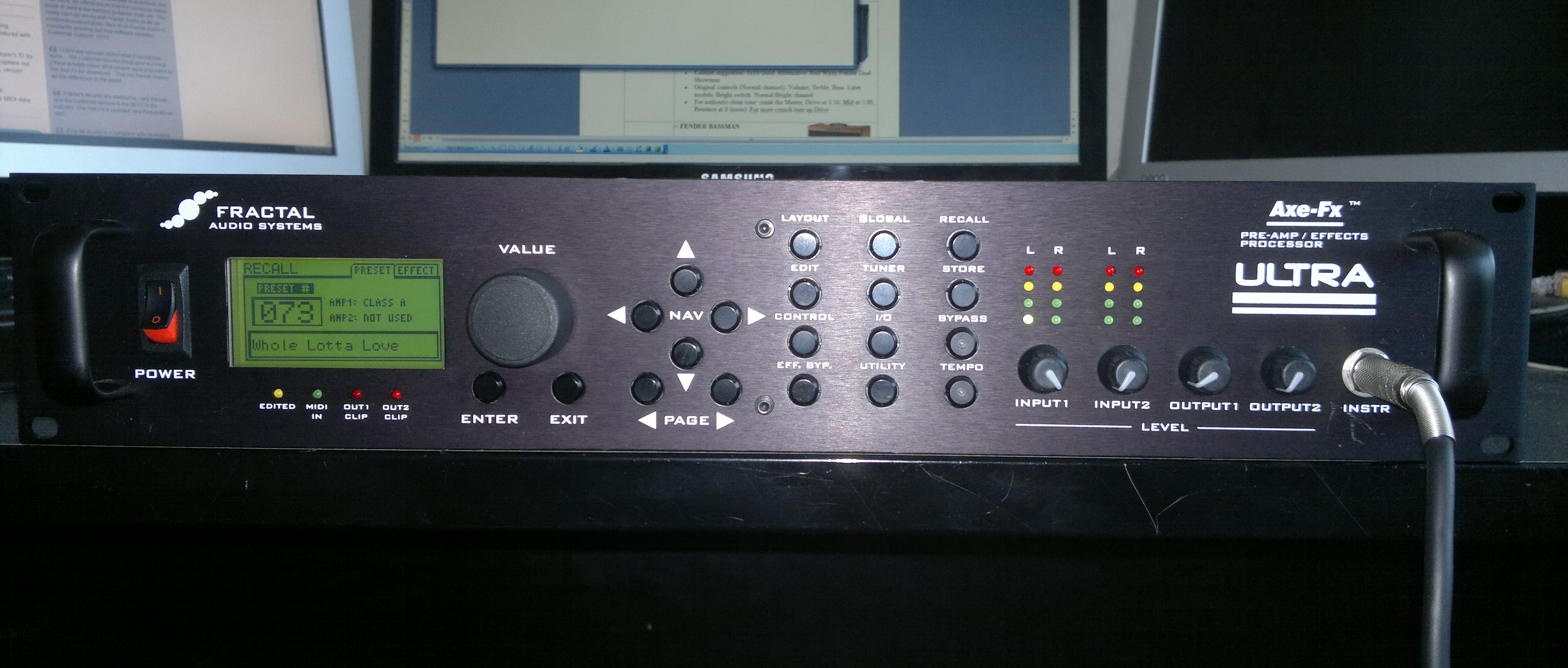
An Axe-FX Ultra

Fractal Audio Systems, often shortened to Fractal, is an American audio equipment manufacturer founded in 2006. Fractal became pioneers of the high-end digital amplifier modeling market with the release of the rack-mount Axe-FX, which has been credited as the first amp modelling and effects system convincing enough for professional use.

== History ==
Fractal was founded by Cliff Chase, who designed both the software and hardware of the company's debut product, the Axe-FX. Although classified as an "amplifier modeler," Chase has disputed the label, stating his priority was not exact emulation of classic guitar amps but rather recreating their sounds in the context of a modern device which emphasized expanded tonal control. The Axe-FX has been adopted by many notable guitarists, particularly for live rigs, such as Steve Vai, John Petrucci, Matt Belamy, and Alex Lifeson. Metallica switched to Fractal equipment after using it in their Freeze 'Em All performance in Antarctica, for which they were unable to bring conventional analog amplifiers. John Mayer utilized an Axe-FX on his 2021 album Sob Rock, alongside his Dumble amps.

The success of the Axe-FX sparked an "arms race" among amp modeler manufacturers, with rivals like Line 6, Neural DSP, and Kemper bringing to market their own products with more advanced specs and build quality.

== Products ==
Fractal expanded the Axe-FX into a family of products, including updates to the original rack-mount system, as well as floor units. Fractal's first floor unit was the FX8, which exclusively offered the Axe-FX's effects emulations; amplifier modeling was added with the AX8, which was replaced by the more compact FM-3 and the larger FM-9.

In the U.S., the Axe-FX can only be purchased via the company's website, rather than through retailers. Chase noted in a 2011 interview that demand was so high that buyers were using HTML scripts to ping the website and automatically place orders when stock was made available, and that as a result batches of new units would sell out in seconds.

The Axe-FX and FM-series modelers were updated in 2024 with "Turbo" editions, featuring new CPU chips and increased processing power. Later that same year, Fractal introduced their first effects-only offering since the discontinued FX8, the four-footswitch VP4 Virtual Pedalboard.

In 2025, Fractal introduced the AM4 amp modeler as the brand's entry point product into its modeling ecosystem. Powered by the same algorithms as the Axe-FX III, the AM4 is Fractal's most compact all-in-one modeler to date, with four footswitches, four universal parameter controls, and a redesigned interface.
