= Tone-Lok =

Tone-Lok Effects are guitar effects pedals from a (now discontinued) product line, introduced by Ibanez in 1999. In contrast with other guitar pedals, they included a "Lok" feature, engaged for each adjustment by pressing down on its corresponding potentiometer's control knob.

== Pedals ==
=== Guitar ===
AP7 Analog Phaser
AW7 Autowah
CF7 Stereo Chorus/Flanger
DE7 Delay/Echo
DS7 Distortion
FZ7 Fuzz
LF7 Lo Fi
PH7 Phaser
PM7 Phase Modulator
SH7 Seventh Heaven
SM7 Smashbox
TC7 Tri Mode Chorus
TS7 Tubescreamer
WD7 Weeping Demon
WD7JR Weeping Demon Junior

=== Bass ===
PD7 Phat-Hed Bass Overdrive
SB7 Synthesizer Bass
