= Ibanez Tube Screamer =

Guitar overdrive pedal

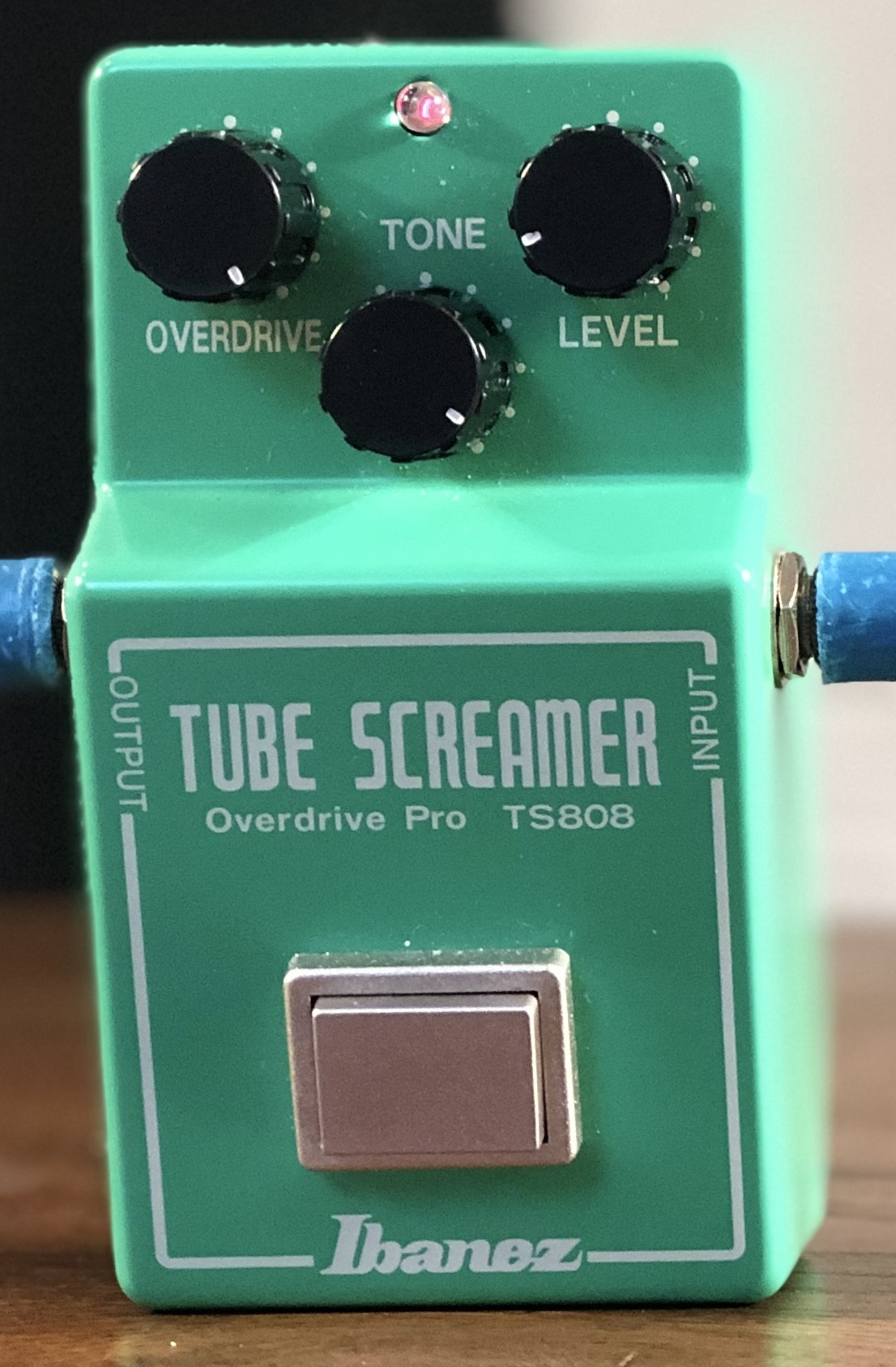
- Ibanez Tube Screamer TS808
- Brand: Ibanez
- Manufacturer: Hoshino Gakki
- Dates: 1979—present

Technical specifications
- Effects type: Overdrive pedal

Controls
- Pedal control: Overdrive, Tone, Level

Input/output
- Inputs: Mono
- Outputs: Mono

The Ibanez Tube Screamer is an overdrive pedal made by Ibanez. First developed by Maxon as a competitor to the Boss OD-1, the Tube Screamer was sold outside of Japan under the Ibanez brand name and became popular among guitarists for its characteristic midrange-boosted tone and amp-like distortion. The Tube Screamer has gone through multiple iterations since its debut in 1979, notably the original TS808 model and its successor, the TS9. Many guitarists have used it to create their signature sound, and it is considered one of the most successful, widely copied, and modified overdrive pedals in the history of the electric guitar.

== Description ==
The Tube Screamer has a drive knob, a tone knob, and a level knob. The drive knob adjusts gain (which can affect the amount of distortion), the tone knob adjusts treble frequencies, and the level knob adjusts the output volume of the pedal. The pedal also provides a boost to midrange frequencies and helps reduce muddiness by cutting bass frequencies. Many guitarists prefer this sort of equalization, as it helps keep their guitar from getting lost in the overall audio mix. This, along with its versatility as a simple distortion, has made the pedal popular for a wide variety of musical styles.

== History ==
=== Development ===
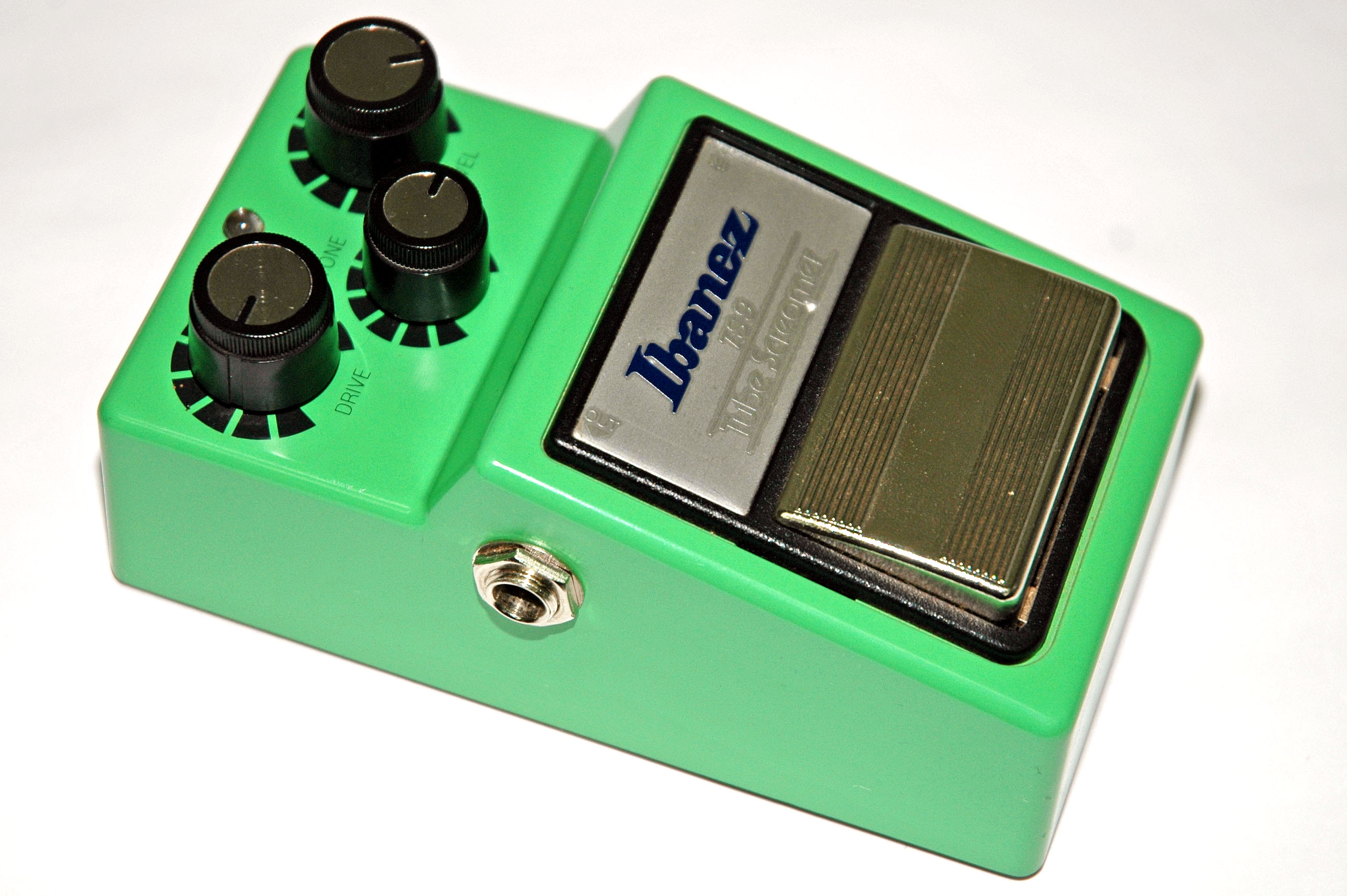
TS-9

In the late 1960s and early 1970s, Ibanez and its parent company, Hoshino Gakki, were best known for producing their own branded copies of guitars made by Gibson, Fender, and Rickenbacker. By the middle of the decade, Ibanez began adding effects pedals to their product line and wished for a model to compete with the Boss OD-1. Nisshin, the Japanese company contracted to make the pedals, first produced the "Overdrive," commonly known as the "Orange Overdrive" due to its color. It used a now-standard three-control format (in this case, Level, Balance, and Distortion) and was housed in a casing similar to the later 808 design. The OD-855 Overdrive II followed, adopting the green color and square footswitch characteristic of the 808. While both pedals could produce overdrive-type distortion at lower gain levels, at higher settings the Overdrive became fuzz-like, and the OD-855 had a significant low-end emphasis.

The original Tube Screamer circuit was created in 1979 by Nisshin engineer Susumu Tamura, who wished to design a pedal that better emulated the effect of playing an overdriven tube amp. As Boss owned the patent for solid-state asymmetrical clipping, Tamura was forced to use a symmetrical clipping design, and rejected several op amps for being too expensive before settling on the JRC 4558D integrated circuit (IC) chip. For audio tests, Tamura used a 1968 Fender Twin Reverb and a Vibrolux Reverb, and occasionally a Marshall 1959 Super Lead.

Tamura's finished design, the OD808 Overdrive Pro, was first sold under Nisshin's Maxon label, as the arrangement with Ibanez allowed Nisshin to sell the same pedal designs under their own brand. However, because Maxon could not export products, they sold the OD808 only domestically. The "Tube Screamer" name was born when Tamura and Hoshino took an OD808 to Sam Ash Music in Manhattan, where Sammy Ash—the company founder's grandson—remarked that the pedal sounded like a "screaming tube amp" and noted that the Dunlop Cry Baby wah-wah pedal was so-named for sounding like a crying baby. As a result, the OD808 was renamed the TS808 Tube Screamer Overdrive Pro for international sales through the Ibanez brand name.

=== Variations ===
The Tube Screamer has gone through many variations since its debut:

- TS-808/TS808: The first Tube Screamer, the TS808, was released in 1979. It was equipped with the Japanese JRC-4558 chip.
- TS9: From 1981 to 1985, Ibanez produced the "9-series" of overdrive pedals. The TS9 Tube Screamer is almost the same internally as the TS808 but the TS9 has a different output, which causes the pedal to sound brighter and less smooth. In later years, TS9s were assembled with a variety of parts, depending on what was available at the time of manufacture, causing the tone to vary widely from batch to batch. Like the TS808 before it, the TS9 was designed by Susumu Tamura.

Once Ibanez discontinued the 9 series pedals, they introduced the "Master" or "L" series. These were only made in 1985, and did not have the Tube Screamer in the line-up.

A rare version of the Tube Screamer was the ST9 Super Tube Screamer, which was sold only in Europe.

- TS10: In 1986, Ibanez began production of the "Power Series", which included the TS10 Tube Screamer. Due to an economic downturn in Japan at the time, TS10s used cheap jacks, pots, and switches that were prone to breaking and could not be replaced.
- TS5: The plastic TS5 "Soundtank" followed the TS10 and was available from 1991 until 1998. The TS5 circuit is very similar to the TS9; however, it was made for Ibanez in Taiwan by Daphon, although designed by Maxon as referenced by Maxon's history website. The first year of production had a metal casing; afterwards, the casing was made out of plastic.
- TS-9 Reissue: With original TS-9s selling for over $250, Ibanez decided to launch a reissue version in 1992. Designers sought to replicate the TS-9 exactly, acquiring as many originals as possible and discovering the majority used the Toshiba TA75558 IC chip, which was then used for the reissue. For authenticity, Ibanez went so far as to date the pedal's manual 1981.
- TS-9DX Turbo: The DX was designed in 1998 for players who wanted more volume, distortion, and low end. In addition to the standard controls, Ibanez added a fourth knob with four mode positions: TS9, +, Hot, and Turbo, each adding low end and increasing volume, but the circuit otherwise replicated that of the original TS9.
- TS7: The TS7 "Tone-Lok" pedal was released in 1999, with the series characterized by how the knobs could be recessed into the pedal to avoid changes to its settings. It was made in Taiwan like the TS5, but in an aluminum case that was more durable. The circuit inside had a "hot" mode switch for extra distortion and volume. Most TS7 pedals came with the JRC4558D chip, like the TS808 and TS9.
- TS808HW: In 2008, Ibanez released the TS808HW, a limited edition, hand-wired version of the original 808 circuit, encased in a dark green, heavy duty metal box. It was the first Tube Screamer to have true-bypass switching.

Demo of a Maxon OD808 overdrive pedal into a clean guitar amp, with a Fender Telecaster

The TS9 and TS808 pedals have been reissued, and according to the company, feature the same circuitry, electronics and design components that helped shape the Tube Screamer sound. Maxon, which produced the original Tube Screamer pedals for the Ibanez brand in the 1970s–1980s, also produce their own version of the Tube Screamer (called Overdrives: the OD-808 and OD-9 as opposed to Tube Screamer, TS).

- TS9B: Released in 2011, it was the first Tube Screamer made for bass players. It had five knobs: Drive, Mix, Bass, Treble and Level controls. The Mix and 2-band Eq. controls allowed bassists to produce the sound they want while still maintaining the feel of the original Tube Screamer and keep their low-end original signal.

== Design ==
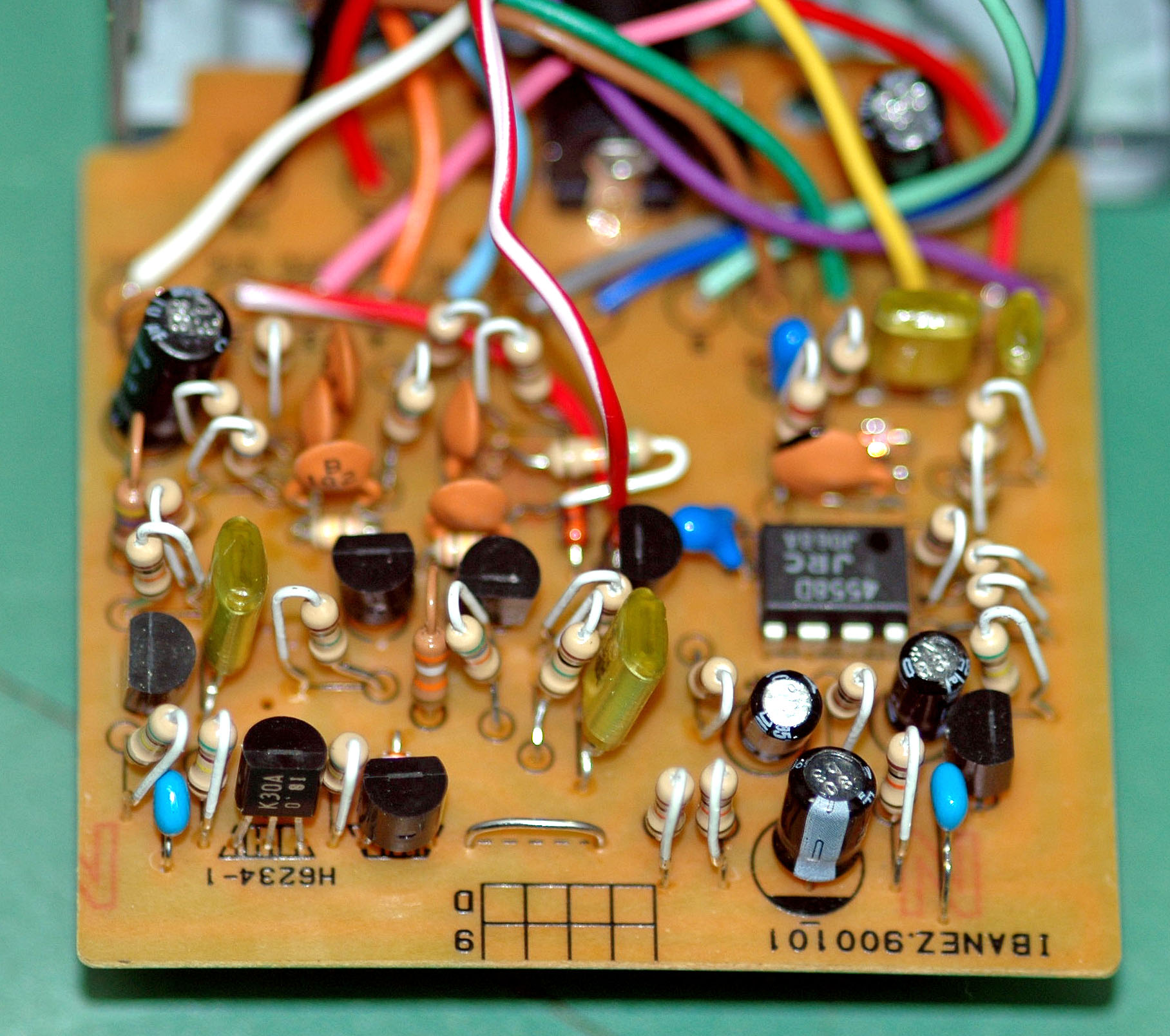

According to Susumu Tamura (田村進) of Maxon, the designer of the Tube Screamer, the initial design concept was to create something to compete with the BOSS OD-1 and MXR Distortion+. In doing so, he used an innovative circuit, using the monolithic operational amplifier device, introduced in early 70s, to create a pedal sound different from the "discrete" transistorized 60's fuzzes.

The overdrive is produced using two silicon diodes in anti-parallel arrangement into the negative feedback circuit of an operational amplifier ("op-amp") circuit, to produce soft, symmetrical distortion of the input waveform. When the output exceeds the forward volt drop of the diodes the amplifier gain is much lower, effectively limiting the output to + and - one diode volt-drop, although due to the exponential I-V curve of the diodes this is not a hard limit. A "drive" potentiomenter in the feedback path provides variable gain. The original 4558 based circuit uses transistor buffers at both the input and the output, to improve impedance matching. This is mathematically equivalent to mixing the input signal with a clipped version of itself, however. Thought of this way, it is said that this "preserves the original dynamics of the input signal which otherwise would get lost at the threshold of clipping" and "avoids muddiness and vastly improves clarity and responsiveness."

Characteristic of the distortion is the symmetrical nature, which produces mainly odd-order harmonics for a sine wave input. All this justifies the "vacuum tube" sound, and the "screaming" tone. As well, Tamura added a simple but effective post-distortion equalization circuit with a first-order high-pass shelving filter that "is linearly dependent on its gain", an approach called "progressivity". The overdrive stage is followed by a simple low-pass filter and active tone control circuit and volume control, using the second op-amp available on-chip.

The circuit uses transistor buffers at both the input and the output, and a modern electronic field-effect transistor (FET) "noiseless" bypass switching to turn the effect on and off. The TS7 allows switching between a "TS9" mode, in which the circuit and all relevant component values are identical to the vintage model, and a "Hot" mode, which introduces an additional gain stage. Yet another variant is the Ibanez ST9 Super Tube that features a fourth knob ("Mid Boost"), which provides a harder attack.

=== JRC4558D op-amp ===
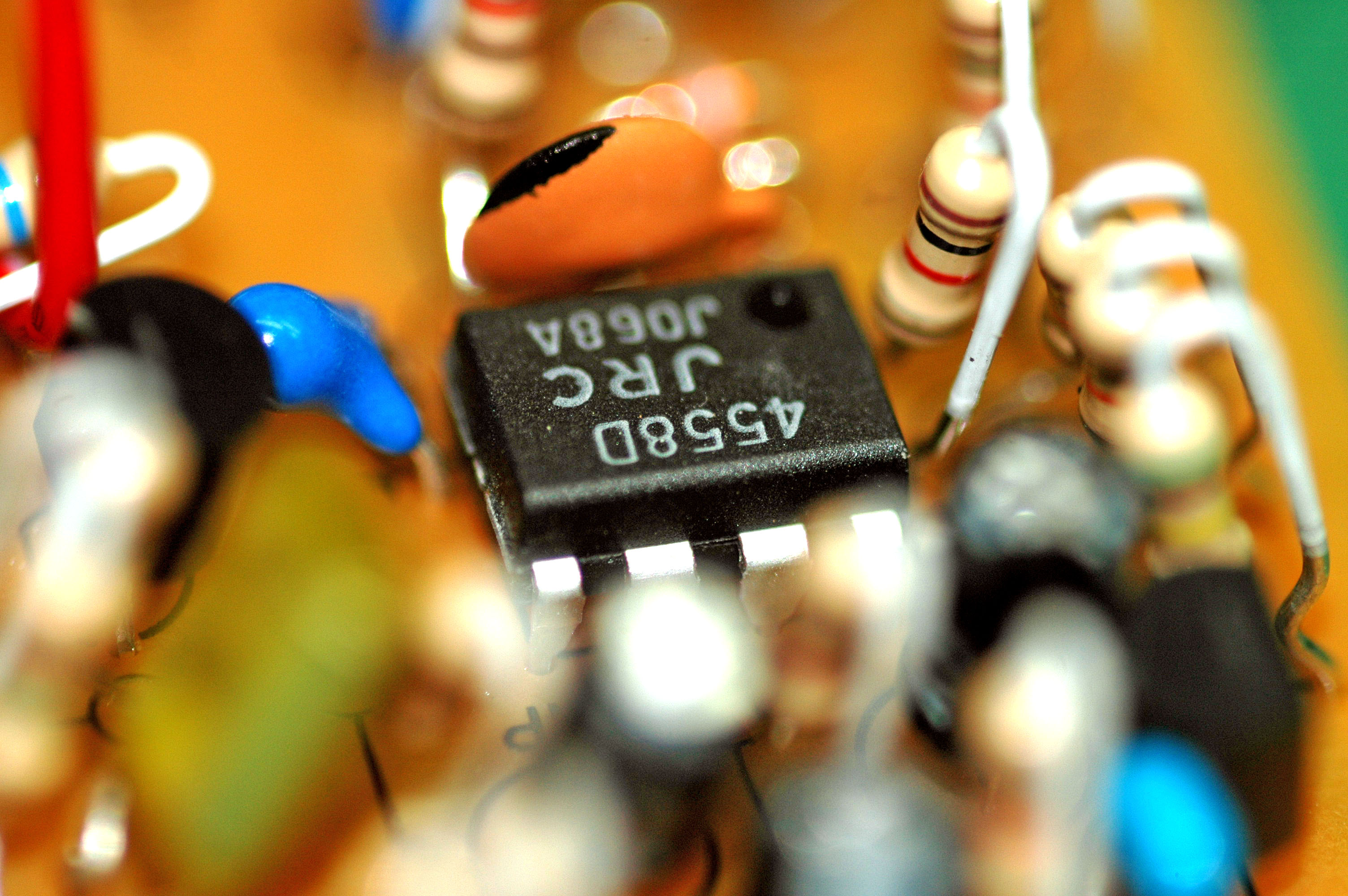

Much has been made of the operational amplifier chips used in the various versions of the Tube Screamer pedal, and several "fairy tales" about the merits of these devices have been written on the subject. The JRC4558D chip is well-regarded by some.

The (RC)4558 is a low priced, general purpose dual operational amplifier, introduced mid 70s by Texas Instruments as an "improved" version of the early 741, and used in thousands of consumer and industrial designs. In fact, JRC4558D is nothing else than the licensed product manufactured by Japan Radio Company (日本無線株式会社), and identical to any other 4558 chip. Other popular chips used included the TL072 (a JFET input type, highly popular in 80s), "original" TI RC4558P, and OPA2134. The TA75558 (yet another version, made by Toshiba), standard in the TS10 alongside the 4558, is strangely regarded as the "ugly duckling of TS opamps".

In reality, the type of op-amp has little to do with the sound of the pedal, which is dominated by the diodes in the op-amp's feedback path. (See Op-amp swapping.)

== Notable users ==
The pedal was popularized by Stevie Ray Vaughan and Lee Ritenour. Phish guitarist Trey Anastasio implements two TS9 Tube Screamers in his rig. Gary Moore used the TS9 predominantly for 30 years which was key to his signature lead guitar sound. Adrian Smith of Iron Maiden has used a TS9 in a majority of his studio and live rigs over the years.

The Tube Screamer is widely used in genres as diverse as country, blues and heavy metal, and has since spawned numerous clones and modified versions. Possible modifications include use of mismatched, or different diodes (for example, a silicon and a germanium device), or more than two diodes in various arrangements, or modified tone circuits. It is also used by many metal guitarists before the lead channel of the high gain amps to make distortion more focused and to cut the low end. Notable modifiers of the pedal include Robert Keeley of Keeley Electronics and Mike Piera of AnalogMan. Joan Jett used a TS9DX model. Ola Englund used a TS9 model, which was his favorite Ibanez Tube Screamer. Arctic Monkeys frontman Alex Turner also used an Ibanez Tube Screamer for the band’s second album, Favourite Worst Nightmare.

== Legacy ==
Premier Guitar wrote that the Tube Screamer was "guitardom's most-iconic overdrive pedal," and suggested that given its enduring popularity and influence, "no single pedal has had a greater impact on musical expression or played as important a role in the development of effects modification." Guitar Player said that the pedal had become a "must-have for legions of guitarists" and had since inspired "countless" imitators. Writing for Guitar World, James Farmer noted that while the OD-1 had introduced "overdrive" to the industry, the Tube Screamer had made it a classic effect, remarking that "no genre [was] untouched" by the Tube Screamer. Farmer also wrote that its success had led to an entire "family tree" of similar pedals that made up a significant portion of the pedal market. Tube Screamer-style pedals from notable brands include the JHS Bonsai, EarthQuaker Devices Plumes, Electro-Harmonix East River Drive, Mooer Green Mile, Way Huge Green Rhino, and Wampler Moxie.

== See also ==
- King of Tone
- Boss SD-1
- Klon Centaur
- List of distortion pedals
