= Neural DSP =

Finnish audio equipment manufacturer

Neural DSP Technologies
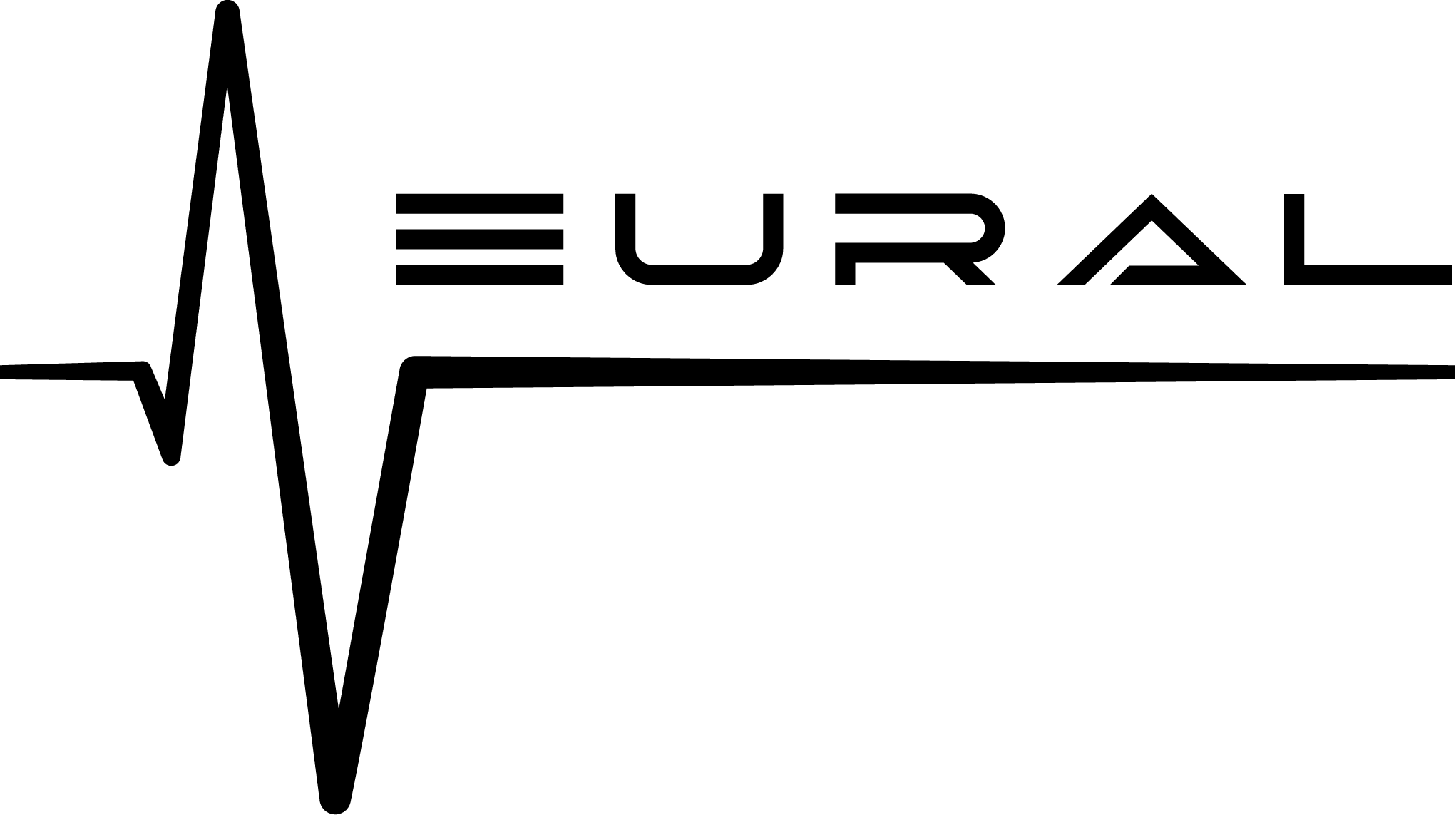
- Industry: Guitar amplification, audio software
- Founded: 2017; 9 years ago
- Founders: Douglas Castro, Francisco Cresp
- Headquarters: Helsinki, Finland
- Products: Digital amplifier modelers
- Website: neuraldsp.com

Neural DSP Technologies is a Finnish audio equipment manufacturer and software developer founded in 2017 by Douglas Castro and Francisco Cresp. Headquartered in Punavuori, Helsinki, the company is best known for its flagship guitar amp modeler, the Quad Cortex, and for its audio plug-ins that create computer-based virtual amplifier and effects modelling suites. The company is considered a leading developer of digital signal processing technology for guitar.

== History ==
In 2016, Douglas Castro, the founder of bass guitar equipment company Darkglass, was approached by employee Francisco Cresp about creating an audio plug-in for the company. Castro was interested, and the pair—both Chilean immigrants in Helsinki—ultimately decided to develop a range of plug-ins for both bass and guitar, in addition to a potential modeler. However, they chose to develop products as a new company to preserve Darkglass' bass-oriented brand identity.

Neural DSP began recruiting designers in late 2017 and early 2018, and in that April released the "Darkglass Ultra" plug-in, followed in September by the "Fortin Nameless," which was the company's first major success. The "Archetype" audio plug-in series was co-developed with high-profile players such as Tim Henson, Cory Wong, and Plini. The public profile these plug-ins created for Neural DSP allowed the company to pursue the creation of its companion hardware device, the Quad Cortex. With companies like Fractal and Universal Audio having achieved great levels of accuracy in recreating amp tones, Neural emphasized significantly improving the user experience as the route to the Cortex's success. Neural soon ran into the slow and expensive process of programming numerous DSPs at the same time. To expedite the process, they utilized AI machine learning, with the assistance of Aalto University's DSP program. Castro later described the Quad Cortex's development process as initially "a black hole of money." Production was then complicated by supply chain shortages resulting from the COVID-19 pandemic, with the company at risk of closing, despite millions of dollars in investment.

The Quad Cortex debuted at NAMM 2020 to acclaim. Guitar World observed that such a young company developing as advanced a modeler as the Quad Cortex "flip[ped] the market on its head," and dubbed it the new "gold standard" in amp modeling. By the following year, Neural's revenue was split equally between software and hardware. Castro was subsequently named Finland's 2022 EY Entrepreneur Of The Year, while the following year Castro and Cresp were recognized by Finnish President Sauli Niinistö for Neural DSP's success on the international market.

In 2024, Neural revealed they had developed a robot—known as a Telemetric Inductive Nodal Actuator, or TINA—that manually controls an amplifier being modeled and records and annotates the results to facilitate audio processing, in a combination of robotic data collection and machine learning. The company has used TINA in the development of all its products, claiming its use removes human bias for greater accuracy, while greatly accelerating the speed at which DSPs are created. Castro and Cresp credited TINA with the company's ability to make up ground compared to their more established competitors.

== Products ==
=== Plug-ins ===
Neural DSP designs both amplifier series plug-ins and signature plug-ins for individual artists. Artists with signature plug-ins include Henson, Wong, Plini, Gojira, Tom Morello of Rage Against the Machine, John Petrucci of Dream Theater, and John Mayer. Amp models offered as plug-ins include the Soldano SLO-100, Mesa/Boogie Mark IIC+, Tone King Imperial Mark II, and Fortin Nameless. The brand also offers plug-ins for bass players: the Darkglass Ultra and the Parallax, and the Ultra's expanded follow-up, Darkglass Ultimate. Neural DSP expanded beyond guitar and bass processing for the first time with Mantra, an all-in-one vocal processing plug-in released in 2025.

=== Quad Cortex ===
Upon its release in 2020, Neural DSP claimed its flagship Quad Cortex was the most powerful floor modeler on the market, with 2 GHz in digital signal processing power via four SHARC+ processors. The Cortex shipped with 50 available guitar and bass amp models, 70 effects, and a thousand impulse responses. It also had features that competitors such as the Fractal Axe-FX and the Line 6 Helix floor modelers did not, including a touch screen interface, Wifi connectivity, and footswitches that combine stomp functionality with rotary actuators. The Cortex also has companion software that allows users to "capture," or digitally recreate, their own analog guitar gear and share it with other users via the Cortex Cloud. By 2026, the Quad Cortex's library had increased to over 90 amps and 100 effects, with 1,000 impulse responses and 2,000 captures.

=== Nano Cortex ===
Neural DSP released its second hardware product, the Nano Cortex, in late 2024. The Nano Cortex represents a smaller-format offering of much of the Quad Cortex's technology, but through a simpler interface with a fixed signal chain and standardized control set, while notably omitting any kind of display. The company has stated they envisioned the Nano Cortex functioning as an "amp in a box" or as a pedal platform for use with a player's distortion pedals.

=== Quad Cortex mini ===
In 2026, Neural DSP debuted a compact version of the Quad Cortex, the Quad Cortex mini, which carried over the same processing power, amp and effects models, and capture technology of the larger flagship model but at less than half the size and under four pounds of weight. The QC mini's form factor consists of a 7" touchscreen surrounded by thin bezels with a rotary footswitch at each corner.

== See also ==
- Kemper Amps
