= Boss Katana =

Guitar and bass amplifier line

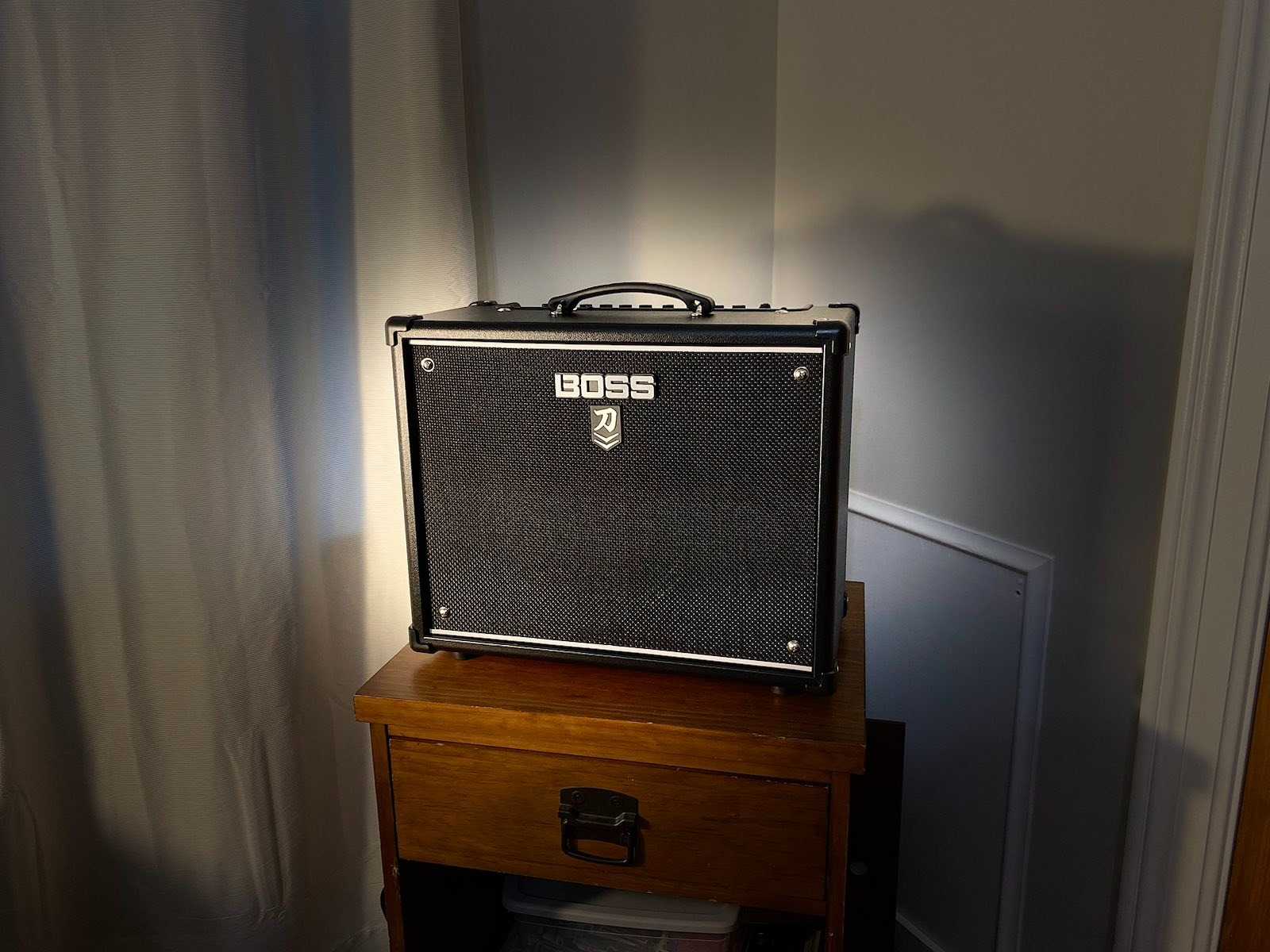
A Boss Katana combo

The Boss Katana is a line of modeling amplifiers for electric guitar and bass introduced by Japanese manufacturer Boss in 2016. While Boss—an effects pedal pioneer—had previously experienced some minor success in the amplifier market, the larger success of the Katana line helped turn Boss into one of the biggest amp companies in the world in less than a decade. The black-clad Katana's all-in-one formula combines a handful of amp model modes with numerous on-board effects options, and produces its sounds through a combination of analog circuitry and digital signal processing. The series is widely acclaimed for its tones, versatility, and affordability, and its high sales across multiple models have made it the best-selling amplifier line in the guitar industry.

== Features ==
Across the Katana amplifier line, models share much of their functionality. Controls are divided into sections such as for the amplifier, equalizer, effects, and output. Its core feature, the "Amp Type" selector, initially had five selectable modes—Clean, Crunch, Lead, Brown, and Acoustic—all based on the brand's "Tube Logic" design architecture. Tube Logic attempts to emulate tube-like tones by modeling the collective behavior of individual components in a tube amp circuit rather than simply modeling the final output. Various modes' distortion are provided by analog gain stages. While most of the amp type modes are original Boss designs, Brown mode notably emulates the famed "Brown Sound" of Eddie Van Halen. Over 60 digital effects based on Boss's own pedals are included, depending on the Katana model, along with the ability to create and store presets with Boss's downloadable "Tone Studio" software. Katanas utilize a reactive Class AB analog power section, with power attenuation via a "Variable Power Control", and the sound is delivered by custom-designed speakers. Among the core Katana models, there are a handful of upgrades reserved for the 100-watt editions, such as an effects loop and compatibility with an expanded foot controller, the six-button GA-FC EX. Subsequent MKII and Generation 3 iterations of the Katana range have continued to add new features, such as a Pushed amp mode (between Clean and Crunch), a line out augmented with adjustable microphone simulations ("Air Feel"), and a "Contour" switch that allows players to tailor the frequency response of the amp to the acoustics of the room being played in.

== Models ==
=== Katana ===
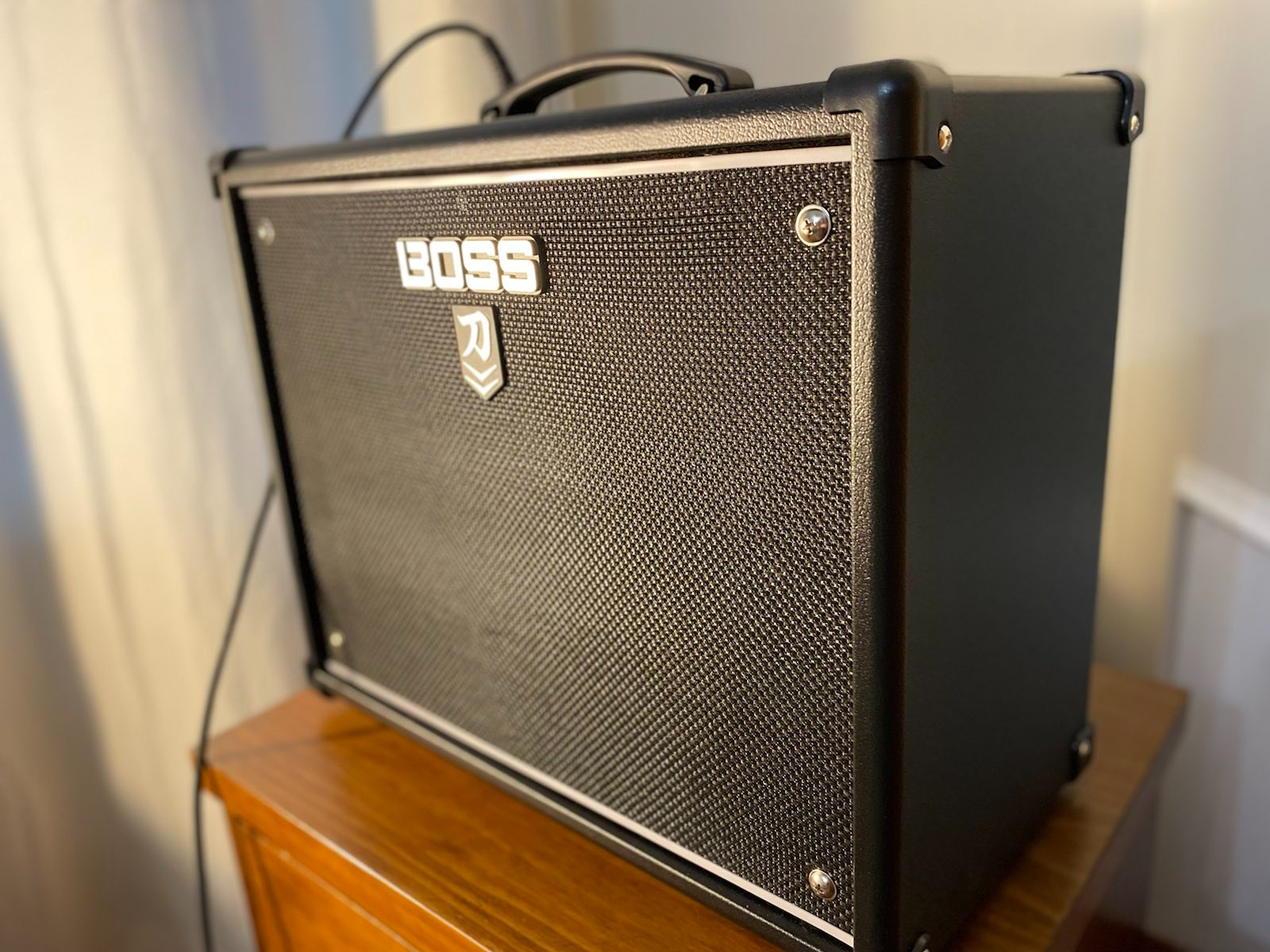
A Boss Katana combo

In 2016, Boss announced its Katana amplifier line, named after the traditional curved swords of Japanese samurai. Consisting of 50-watt and 100-watt combos and a 100-watt head, Boss wrote in a press release that the new line "embodies BOSS's determined pursuit of the ultimate rock sound." The amps notably combined amp model emulations with an expansive set of on-board effects, as well as other modern features, proving that "authentic valve-worthy tones and forward-thinking modern features could co-exist in harmony", according to a Guitar World retrospective. The Katana line was an "overnight success" for Boss, receiving praise from professional reviewers and, as of 2023, selling over a million units. This success helped propel Boss into the upper echelons of amp manufacturers and spawned an expanded line of Katana-branded sub-models from Boss.

Despite strong sales of the original Katanas, Boss upgraded the line in 2019 with a second generation, the MKIIs. New features included a "Variation" button that offered a second version of each amp type, USB and headphones outputs, and a power amp input for use with dedicated preamps and modelers. In 2025, Boss released another update, dubbed "Generation 3". Gen 3 represents an incremental evolution of the product line, focusing on an overall improvement in tone quality while adding new features like a Pushed amp mode placed between Clean and Crunch modes and Bluetooth connectivity. While the lack of Bluetooth had previously been a consistent criticism of the main Katana models, the need for a separate adaptor to use Bluetooth with the Gen 3 models has also been criticized.

=== Katana-Air ===
Although wireless receivers had already been common place for electric guitars and basses for decades, the technology was not implemented in amplifiers until Boss did so with the 2018 release of the Katana-Air, which the brand marketed as "the world's first totally wireless guitar amplifier." A 30-watt amp with two 3" speakers, it featured all five amp models from the main Katana line, as well as 58 effects options, accessed via two knobs: BST/Mod and Delay/FX. The Air offered Bluetooth, battery or AC power, and a dedicated mobile phone app for controlling the amp and editing settings. Boss updated the Air in 2023 with the Katana-Air EX, which has more wattage (35), larger speakers (5"), and a redesigned cabinet.

=== Katana Artist ===
The Artist models represent an upscale version of the Katana experience, superseding the originals as the line's flagship. The Artist models carry over Gen 3's updates, such as the now-standard six amp modes (including Pushed) and the "Variation", "Contour", and "Air Feel" controls. Boss further expanded user control of the amp from its front panel, employing concentric knobs for the effects section paired with multi-colored backlit buttons that allows users to cycle through various settings. The Artist models also include global resonance and presence controls in addition to the master volume, plus power attenuation and cabinet resonance functions. Like the standard Katanas, the Artist models come in 50- and 100-watt combos, along with a 100-watt head.

=== Katana Bass ===
Boss debuted its first bass-specific Katana models in 2022, offering the Katana-110 Bass and the Katana-210 Bass, a 60-watt 1x10 combo and a 160-watt 2x10 combo, respectively. The models offer three preamp types, Vintage, Flat, and Modern; a four-band EQ with bass, low mid, high mid, and treble controls; and multiple on-board effects, among other features. A head version, the Katana-500 Bass Head, along with the accompanying Katana Cabinet 112 Bass, was released in 2024.

=== Katana:GO ===
The Katana:GO, released in 2024, was Boss's first entry into the headphone amp market, which had been popularized by the earlier release of Fender's Mustang model. The Katana:GO, like the Mustang, was a small black device that plugged straight into the guitar's output jack and utilized a small screen, central control wheel, and other side-mounted controls. While the Katana:GO was well-reviewed upon its release, it was discontinued a mere two months after its introduction, with Boss citing trouble procuring the necessary parts to build them to explain their product's abrupt cancelation. A second-generation model was then released eight months later, in early 2025, having undergone several design changes, such as revising the GO's form factor and moving the main control wheel to the side. Other functionalities remained the same.

=== Katana-Mini ===
Boss's Katana-Mini brought a stripped-down version of the Katana range to the portable, battery-powered amp market. Released in 2017, the original Mini was 7W with a 4" speaker and top-mounted controls; it had three amp models—Clean, Crunch, and Brown—and only one effect, delay. It ran on a 9v adapter or a pair of AA batteries. In 2024, Boss released its successor, the Katana-Mini X, which featured numerous upgrades. Boss increased the wattage to 10W with a 5" speaker, in a larger housing with front-facing controls. While the three amp model modes were maintained, the "Variation" option was added, and the number of available effects was increased. The Mini X also features Bluetooth and USB-C connectivity and a rechargeable battery.
