= Tech 21 =

American audio equipment manufacturer

- Type: Private
- Founded: 1989; 37 years ago
- Founder: Andrew Barta
- Headquarters: New York City, New York, U.S.
- Area served: Worldwide
- Products: effect pedals, amps, and DI boxes
- Website: www.tech21nyc.com

Tech 21 is a New York–based manufacturer of guitar and bass effect pedals, amps, and DI boxes which allow the user to emulate the tone of many popular guitar amps and record those sounds directly into a mixer.

== Products ==
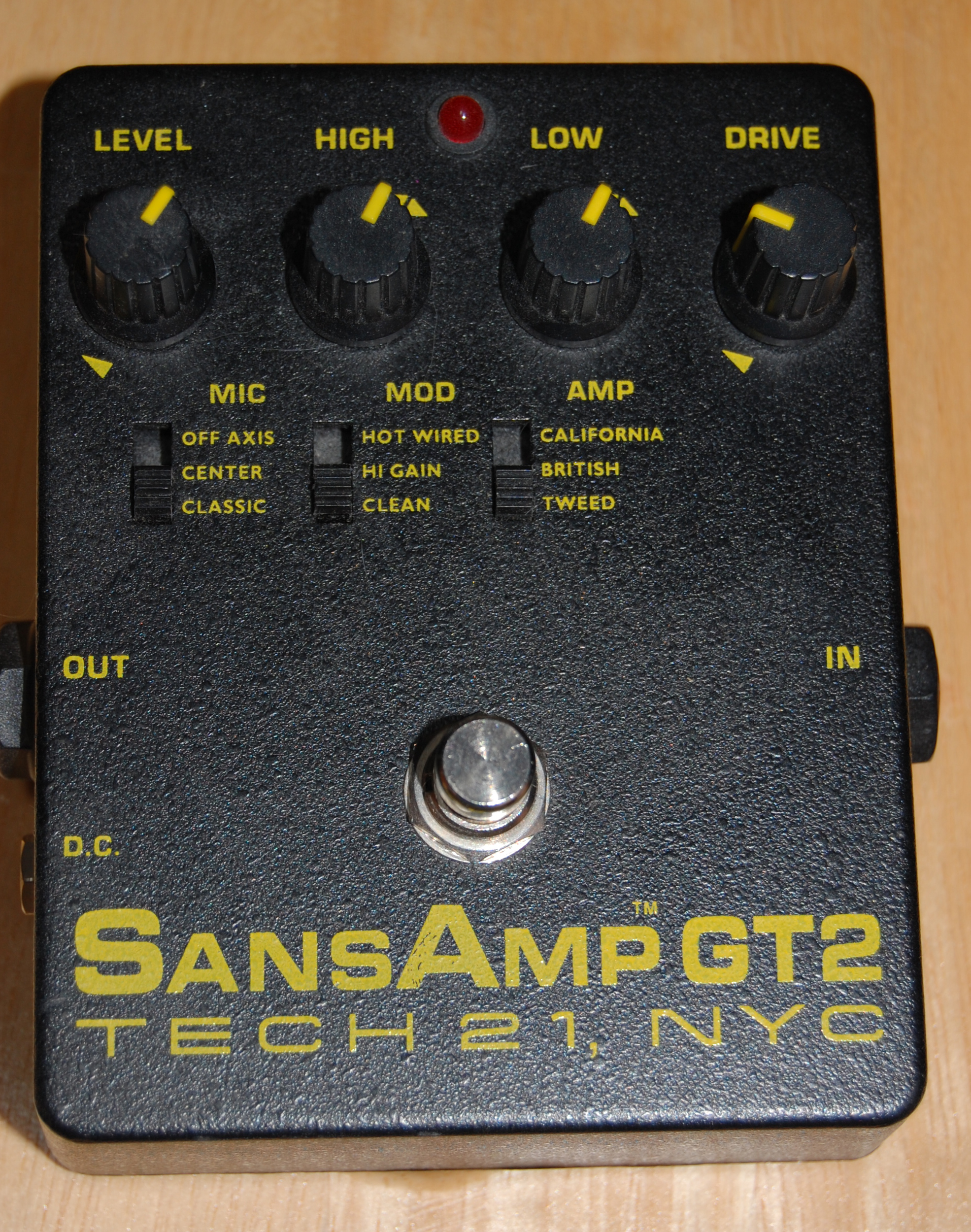
Tech 21 SansAmp GT2, a pedal emulating various guitar amplifiers and speakers

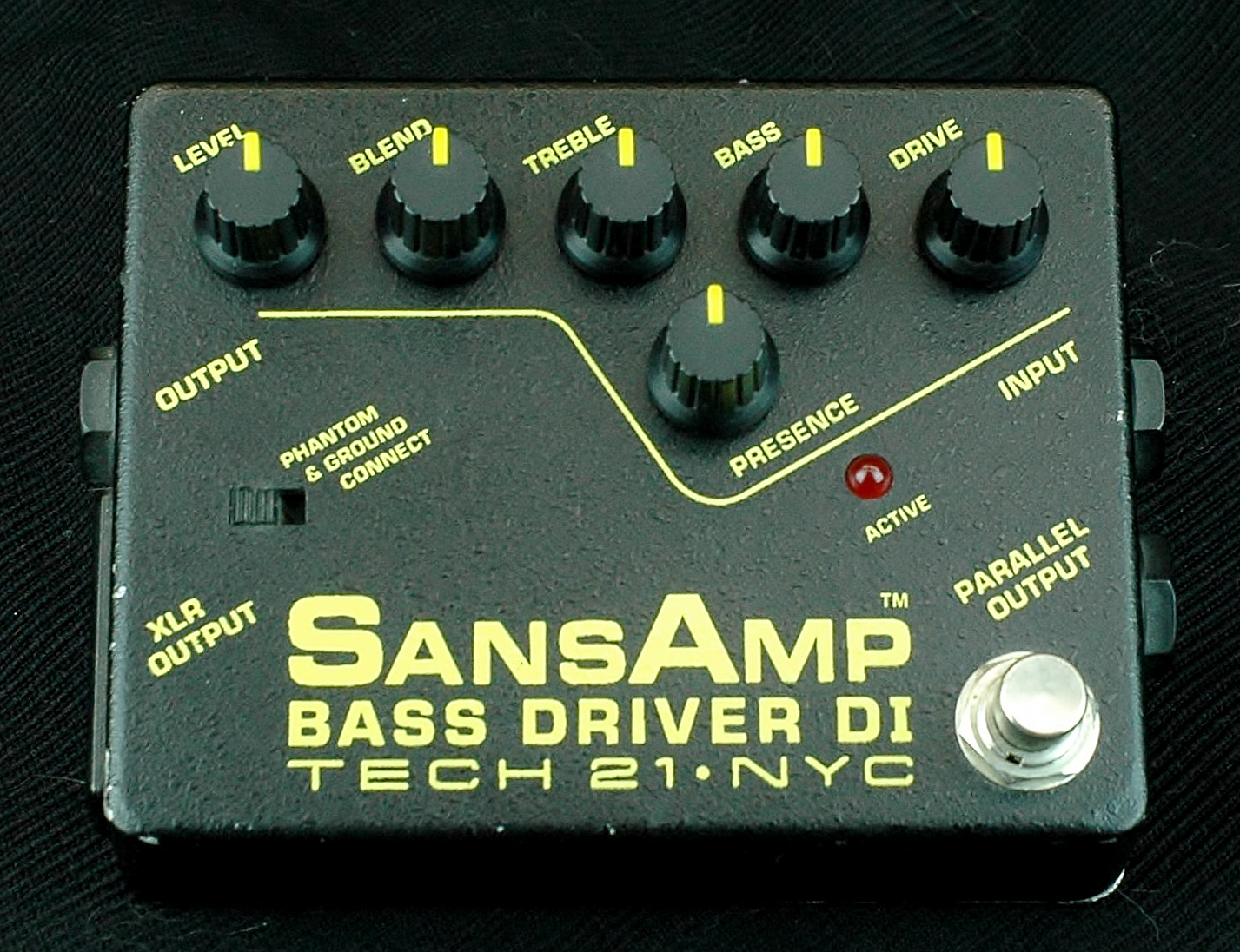
Tech 21 SansAmp Bass Driver DI, for bass guitar

Tech 21's core product, the SansAmp, was designed by founder Andrew Barta, and introduced in 1989. The SansAmp (from French: sans ampli, "without an amp") is an analog effects pedal emulating a variety of different guitar amplifiers and speakers and enables recording direct to a mixing console. The SansAmp became popular in the 1990s. Later, SansAmp became an entire line of products for various instruments and applications.

Tech 21 offerings include the Fly Rig Series, artist signature gear for Geddy Lee, Richie Kotzen, Paul Landers, dUg Pinnick, and Steve Harris. Other products have included distortion pedals as well as a range of amplifiers that use SansAmp technology built in.

While being the precursor to digital amp modeling technology, Tech 21 relies on analog technology, rather than digital signal processing.
