= Mooer Audio =

Effects pedal manufacturer

Shenzhen Mooer Audio Co., Ltd.
- "Small, Smart, Original"
- Company type: Private
- Industry: Consumer electronics
- Founded: 2010
- Headquarters: Shenzhen, China
- Products: Effect pedals, guitar amplifiers, pedalboards
- Website: www.mooeraudio.com

Shenzhen Mooer Audio Co., Ltd. is a manufacturer of musical accessories, especially effects units, created in 2010, and based in Shenzhen, China.

== Overview ==
The company's most popular series is made up of compact guitar effects pedals, called the Micro series. The design of the pedals revolve around a normal sized knob in the center that controls a main function, and two to three smaller knobs that control other functions. Most of the pedals are made to be similar to other popular pedals. Examples include the Mooer Ninety Orange Phaser, similar to the MXR Phase 90 and Mooer's Green Mile Overdrive, based on the Ibanez Tube Screamer. The series consists of 60 pedals.

The company's Spark series, even smaller than the Micro series, consists of some very basic pedal ideas and only 9 pedals.

In 2014, the company debuted its Twin series. A reverb unit called the ShimVerb Pro is a more complex and upgraded version of the Micro series' ShimVerb, featuring stereo inputs and outputs, five different reverb types, and more controls. A delay unit called the Reecho Pro was made along the same premise of the ShimVerb Pro, featuring many more delay types and settings as well as a 20-second looper.

In 2015, at the NAMM Show, Mooer debuted a wah pedal, called "The Wahter", thus starting a "Mini" series. To create more room for the foot, u-shaped bars fold up from the pedal and fold back in for compact storage.

In addition to guitar effects pedals, the company also makes guitar effects processors, mini guitar amplifiers, and pedal boards specifically made for the Micro series.

In 2019, New York pedal company Electro-Harmonix won a court case against Mooer for infringement of EHX’s copyrighted software.
