= Hindsville, Arkansas =

- Town
- Location in Madison County, Arkansas
- Coordinates: 36°08′45″N 93°51′46″W
- Country: United States
- State: Arkansas
- County: Madison

Area
  - Total: 0.37 sq mi (0.97 km^{2})
  - Land: 0.37 sq mi (0.96 km^{2})
  - Water: 0 sq mi (0.00 km^{2})
- Elevation: 1,375 ft (419 m)

Population (2020)
  - Total: 90
  - Estimate (2025): 95 ▲
  - Density: 242.2/sq mi (93.51/km^{2})
- Time zone: UTC-6 (Central (CST))
  - Summer (DST): UTC-5 (CDT)
- ZIP code: 72738
- Area code: 479
- FIPS code: 05-32470
- GNIS feature ID: 2405843

Hindsville is a town in Madison County, Arkansas, United States. The population was 90 at the 2020 census. It is part of the Northwest Arkansas metropolitan area.

The community was named after John Hinds, a first settler.

== Geography ==
In 2007, U.S. Highway 412 was widened to four lanes and now bypasses the town completely. Via US 412 it is 19 miles (31 km) west to Springdale and 9 miles (14 km) southeast to Huntsville, the Madison county seat.

According to the United States Census Bureau, Hindsville has a total area of 0.37 square miles (0.96 km^{2}), of which 0.002 square miles (0.0052 km^{2}), or 0.53%, are water. The town is drained by Whitener Branch, a west-flowing tributary of the White River.

Hindsville Lake, 3 miles (5 km) west of the town, is one of the oldest reservoirs in Arkansas. While Lake Conway was the first in the state to be commissioned by the Arkansas Game and Fish Commission, Lake Hindsville was the first to be built, with its construction completed in March 1950 before bids on Lake Conway had even been submitted. In 2007 it was drained, so that the dam could be repaired.

== Demographics ==
Historical population
| Census | Pop. | Note | %± |
|---|---|---|---|
| 1990 | 69 | | — |
| 2000 | 75 | | 8.7% |
| 2010 | 61 | | −18.7% |
| 2020 | 90 | | 47.5% |
| 2025 (est.) | 95 | ▲ | 5.6% |
U.S. Decennial Census

As of the census of 2000, there were 75 people, 27 households, and 21 families residing in the town. The population density was 87.8 people/km^{2} (227 people/mi^{2}). There were 28 housing units at an average density of 32.8 units/km^{2} (85 units/mi^{2}). The racial makeup of the town was 100.00% White. 2.67% of the population were Hispanic or Latino of any race.

There were 27 households, out of which 22.2% had children under the age of 18 living with them, 51.9% were married couples living together, 14.8% had a female householder with no husband present, and 22.2% were non-families. 18.5% of all households were made up of individuals, and 11.1% had someone living alone who was 65 years of age or older. The average household size was 2.78 and the average family size was 2.90.

In the town, the population was spread out, with 32.0% under the age of 18, 6.7% from 18 to 24, 24.0% from 25 to 44, 20.0% from 45 to 64, and 17.3% who were 65 years of age or older. The median age was 32 years. For every 100 females, there were 97.4 males. For every 100 females age 18 and over, there were 96.2 males.

The median income for a household in the town was $22,500, and the median income for a family was $37,708. Males had a median income of $18,750 versus $14,500 for females. The per capita income for the town was $13,868. There were 9.5% of families and 14.3% of the population living below the poverty line, including none under 18 and 8.3% of those over 64.

== Education ==
Residents zoned to the Huntsville School District.

== Notable people ==
- George William Fullerton, co-founder of G&L Musical Instruments and long-time associate of Leo Fender
