= Ernie Ball =

American entrepreneur

- Born: Roland Sherwood Ball; August 30, 1930; Santa Monica, California, U.S.
- Died: September 9, 2004 (aged 74); San Luis Obispo, California, U.S.
- Occupations: Entrepreneur, musician, innovator
- Years active: 1957–2004
- Spouse: Nova Gail Conley
- Children: Sherwood Ball; David Ball; Sterling Ball; Nova Ball
- Parent(s): Roland Adelbert Ball; Frances Shankland
- Relatives: Ernest Ball (grandfather); Hannah Marks (granddaughter)
- Musical career
- Genres: Rock
- Instruments: Guitar, bass guitar

Ernie Ball (born Roland Sherwood Ball; August 30, 1930 – September 9, 2004) was an American entrepreneur and musician who developed guitar-related products. Ball began as a club and local television musician and entrepreneur, building an international business in guitars and accessories. Ernie Ball Inc. is the eponymous corporation Ball started to market guitar accessories.

== Early life ==
Ball was born Roland Sherwood Ball in Santa Monica, California, and grew up in a musical family, the son of Frances (née Shankland) and Roland Adelbert Ball. His paternal grandfather, Ernest Ball, wrote the music of the standard "When Irish Eyes Are Smiling" and his father was a car salesman who taught Hawaiian steel guitar on the side. Although Ball began to play steel guitar at age nine to please his father, he lost interest for several years. In his early teens he took a renewed interest in the instrument, practicing as many as three hours a day. Within a year he was a member of the Musicians Union.

== Career ==
=== Professional musician ===
While still in his early teens, Ball began playing professionally in South Central Los Angeles beer bars. By age 19 he joined the Tommy Duncan Band playing pedal steel guitar. Duncan, the former lead singer with Bob Wills and His Texas Playboys, took the band on tour through the Southwestern United States. During the Korean War, he did a tour of duty in the United States Air Force Band, playing guitar and bass drum. After the military, he returned to Los Angeles and continued playing in barrooms and lounges, until landing a job on the 1950s "Western Varieties" program at KTLA television. The position soon gained him wider recognition in the Los Angeles music scene and led to studio work and teaching jobs.

=== Entrepreneurship ===
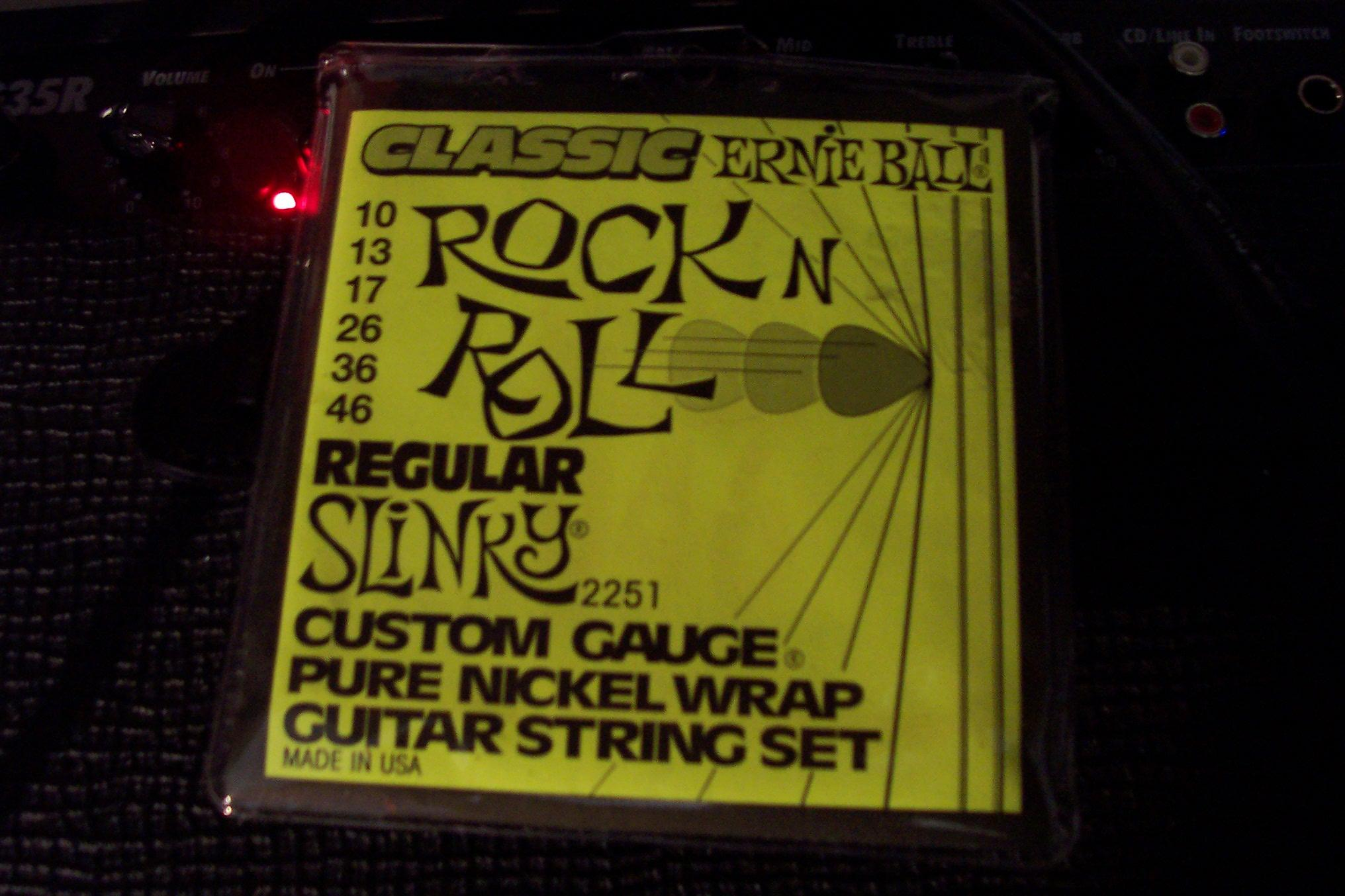
Ernie Ball guitar string set, 2007

Sometime in 1957 or 1958, Ball opened a music store in Tarzana, California. He claimed it was the first shop in the United States to sell guitars exclusively. When music sales representatives criticized him for refusing to sell drumsticks and other musical equipment, Ball replied, "I just want to sell guitars." Within the next two years he opened additional stores in Canoga Park and Thousand Oaks.

In the 1960s, Ball began manufacturing custom guitar strings. Ernie Ball closed his stores and moved to Newport Beach in 1967 to focus on selling products. By the early 1970s, Ball established brand distributors in Europe and Asia. Eventually, the products spawned from his company would sell in more than 5,500 stores and be exported to more than 70 countries of the world. Ball, along with former Fender employee George Fullerton, was instrumental in the development of the first modern acoustic bass guitar, introduced under the Earthwood brand in 1972. Although unsuccessful, surviving models are highly collectable. In the early eighties, Ball bought the Music Man Company, further expanding into the production of guitars, basses, and amplifiers.

In 1985, the company was moved to a new facility in San Luis Obispo and remained there with all of its operations until early 2003, when the company relocated its string manufacturing to Coachella in Southern California’s Riverside County. Under Ball's leadership, it grossed more than $40 million per annum.

== Personal life and death ==
Ball had diverse interests including collecting cars, surfing and flying airplanes. He also authored a series of books and manuals on guitar playing. He was married to Nova Gail (Conley), and had four children: Sherwood Ball, the ex-husband of actress Susan Anspach, David Ball, Sterling Ball, and Nova Ball (former actress). His granddaughter is actress Hannah Marks (daughter of Nova Ball).

Ball remained active in his company until his death 42 years after its founding. He died from an ongoing, undisclosed illness on September 9, 2004, leaving the business to his sons and other family members. He was buried near his home at San Luis Cemetery in San Luis Obispo, California.

== See also ==
- Michael DeTemple, an American musician, luthier, and acquaintance of Ball
