= Music Man StingRay =

Electric bass guitar

StingRay
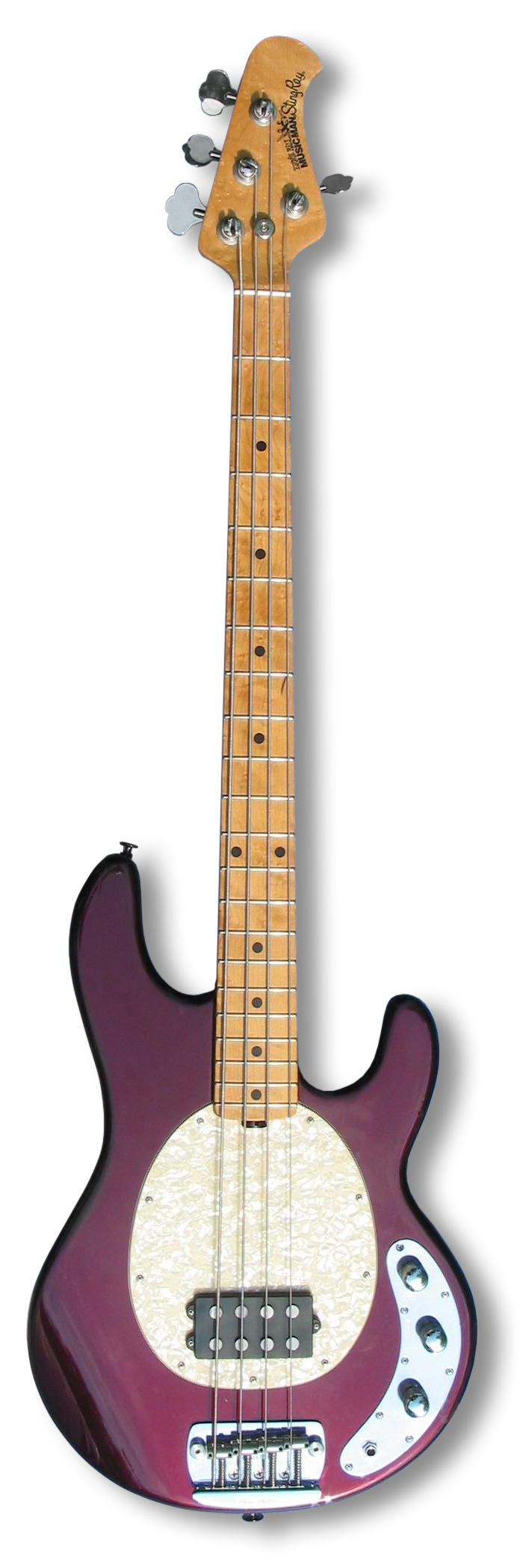
- An Ernie Ball Music Man StingRay
- Manufacturer: Music Man; Ernie Ball Music Man
- Period: 1976 — 1984 (Music Man); 1984 — present (Ernie Ball Music Man)

Construction
- Body type: Solid
- Neck joint: Bolt-on, Neck-through (as of 2015)

Woods
- Body: Ash, alder, basswood
- Neck: Maple
- Fretboard: Fretted: maple, rosewood, ebony Fretless: pau ferro (lined and unlined options available)

Hardware
- Bridge: Fixed
- Pickup(s): One active humbucker Two active humbuckers on HH models

The Music Man StingRay is an electric bass originally made by Music Man. Introduced in 1976, the StingRay was co-designed by Leo Fender and followed a similar format to his namesake company's influential Precision Bass. Notable design changes to the "P-Bass" were the use of a headstock with a 3+1 tuning machine configuration, an egg-shaped pickguard, an oversized humbucker pickup in the bridge position, and the introduction of active electronics, which allowed for expanded EQ controls. Following Music Man's sale to Ernie Ball Inc. in 1984, the StingRay continued to be produced as the Ernie Ball Music Man StingRay. The StingRay was considered revolutionary upon its release and it has since become one of the industry's most popular electric bass models.

== History ==
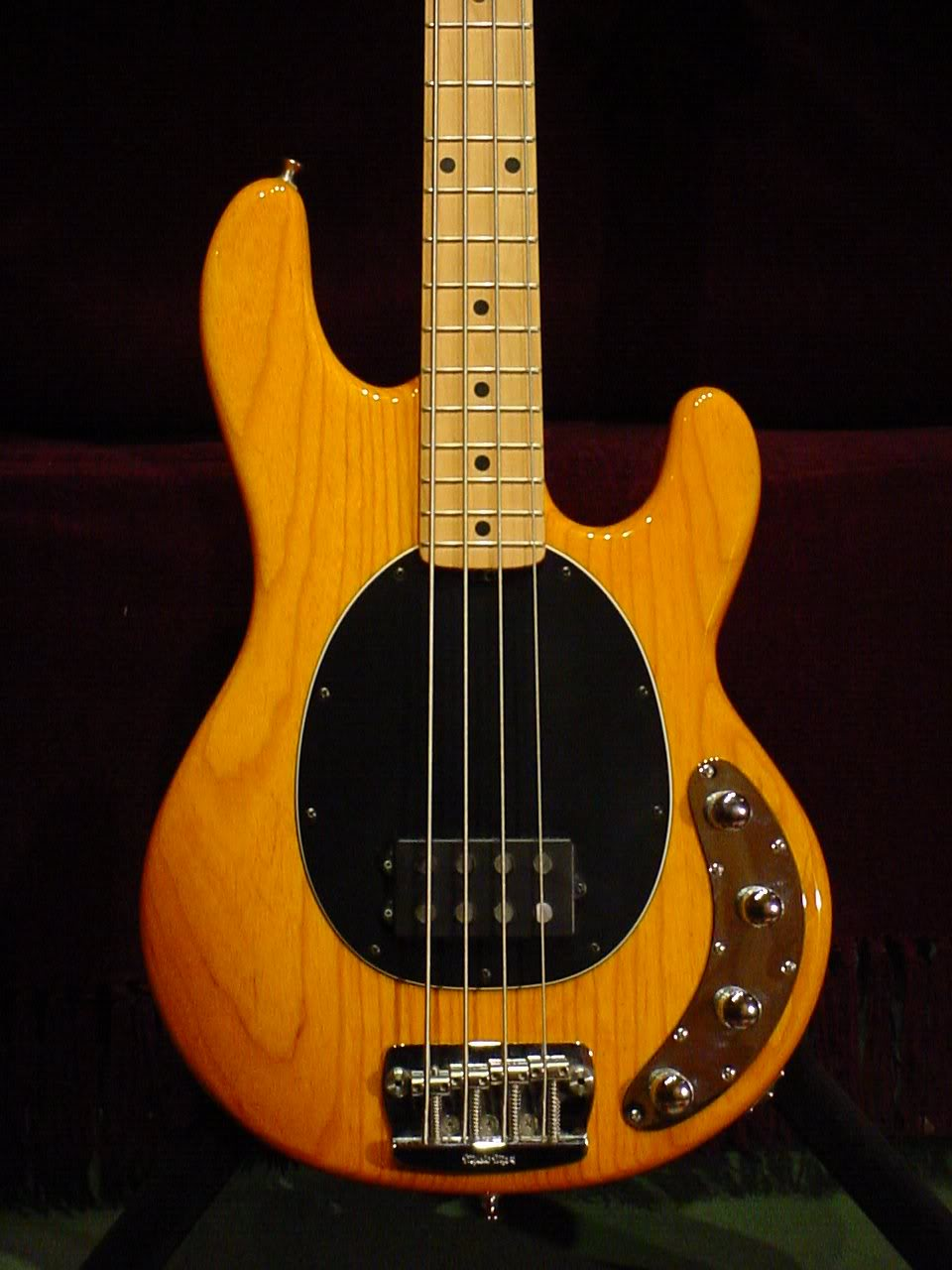
A 2001 StingRay in Trans Gold.

In 1971, Leo Fender became a financial backer and silent partner in what would become Music Man, a company founded by former Fender employees Forrest White and Tom Walker. Having previously sold his company to CBS, Leo Fender was appointed Music Man's president in 1974 upon the expiration of his non-compete clause and the firm began working on guitars and basses.

The StingRay bass design was primarily a collaboration between Fender and Walker, with bass player Sterling Ball providing beta-testing advice. Fender's concept for this new bass would differ from his previous models by featuring a humbucker with oversized magnets, a headstock with a "3+1" tuner configuration, and a bridge with large, barrel saddles. Walker, an electrical engineer, designed the first-of-its-kind active preamp circuit and tailored it to Fender's own tastes. The preamp allowed for a more powerful signal and a wider frequency response, which would enable a uniquely bright tone the bass would become known for. The StingRay was released in 1976 to immediate success, with bassists in the emerging progressive funk and disco scenes being among the first to popularize the StingRay. One such player, slap bass pioneer Louis Johnson, began using a StingRay soon after it was released, while the bass's low-end thump was used to great effect on songs like Chic's "Le Freak" by Bernard Edwards. The StingRay's popularity expanded in the 1980s, especially in rock music. John Deacon's iconic bass line in "Another One Bites the Dust" was notably played on one. Other rock players of the era included AC/DC's Cliff Williams, Aerosmith's Tom Hamilton, and Bad Company's Boz Burrell.

In 1984, Music Man was purchased by guitar string manufacturer Ernie Ball Inc.—by then owned by Sterling Ball—and a refined version of the StingRay, dubbed the Ernie Ball Music Man StingRay, was the brand's first instrument. Ernie Ball sought to improve consistency compared to the Music Man era, while adding new features like body contours, a midrange control to the existing two-band bass and treble format, and later on 18v operation. A five-string variant, the "StingRay 5", was released in 1988 and played by bassists like Tony Levin. Flea of the Red Hot Chili Peppers, Tim Commerford of Rage Against the Machine, and Rex Brown of Pantera all played StingRays in the 1990s. Dual humbucking pickup configurations were released in the mid-2000s. Ernie Ball also collaborated with Darkglass on the "DarkRay" model, which incorporated two of the Finnish brand's distortion pedal circuits into the StingRay's preamp. Lower-cost StingRay models are manufactured overseas and sold under the Sterling by Music Man brand name.

== Tone ==
The StingRay is often credited with having a distinctive sound, with deeper lows than a Precision Bass, scooped mids, and bright, snappy highs. The StingRay's characteristic top end was in large part the result of both Leo Fender's tonal preferences and, according to Ball, his physical ailments, as Fender preferred the brighter sounds of country music but also suffered from a diminished ability to hear certain frequencies. Releasing a bass with this (not entirely intentional) brighter tone at a time when many prominent players were looking for such a sound would prove fortuitous, with Ball later calling the StingRay's combination of tone and timing a "happy accident".

== Design ==
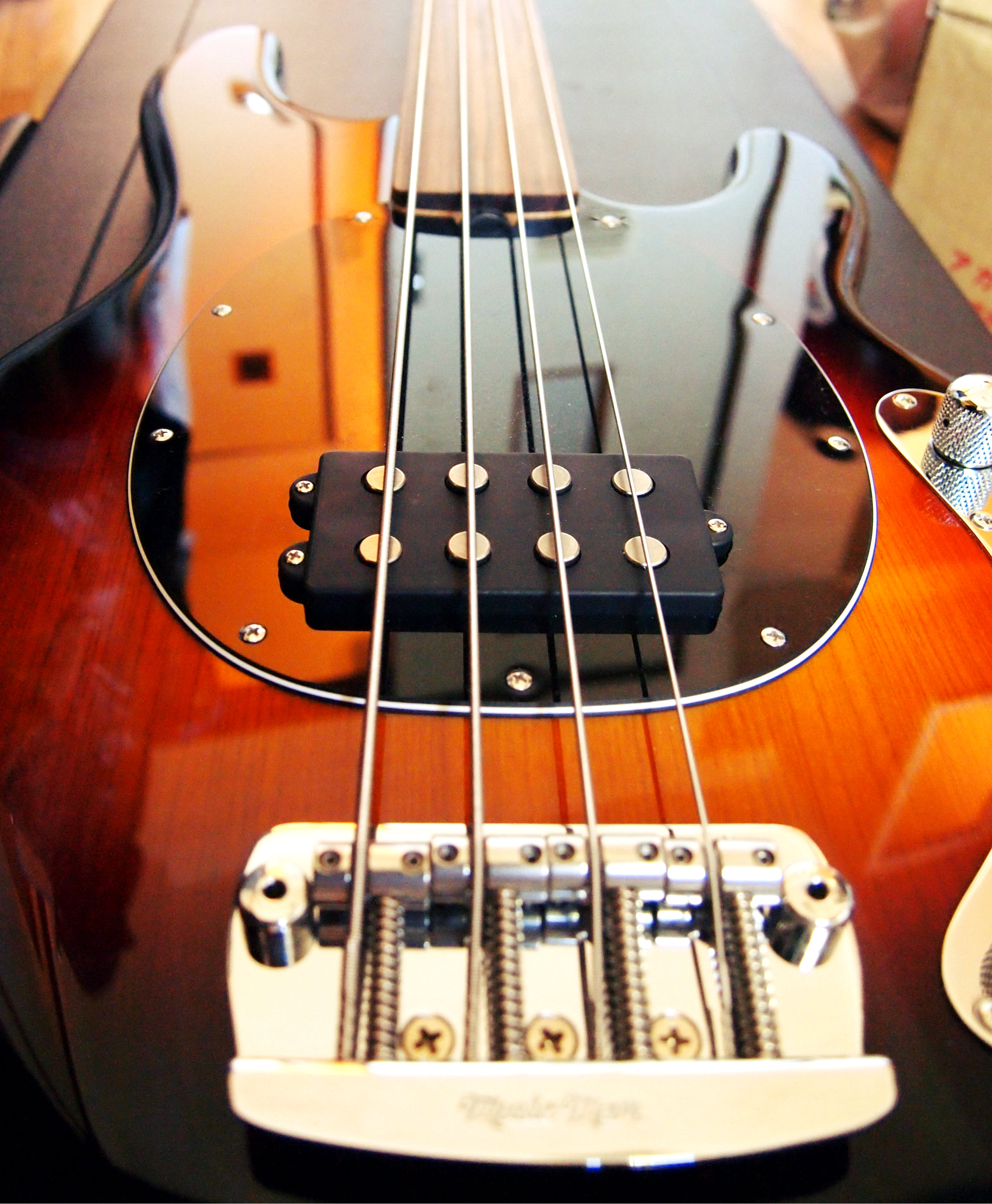
Close-up of the StingRay's bridge and humbucker.

The StingRay bass was, in essence, a "modern update" of Fender's Precision and Jazz basses, and "arguably Leo Fender's final great design achievement," according to Guitar World. The original StingRay design employed a single, unusually-large humbucking pickup placed closer to the bridge than on basses like Fender's Precision. Unlike almost all other guitar and bass humbuckers, which are wired in series, the StingRay humbucker is wired in parallel, sending each coil's signal to the electronics independently. This parallel wiring is considered a key element of the StingRay's sound. Music Man initially used Alnico magnets, but this was later changed to ceramic magnets. The pickup also features uniquely-large pole pieces.

Music Man paired the StingRay's humbucker with an active preamp powered by a 9-volt battery. Early iterations of this preamp came with a 2-band EQ (bass and treble), later augmented by an optional third band (midrange), and piezo pickups located in the bridge saddles. The StingRay's active preamp was sealed in epoxy to avoid reverse engineering of the technology that came to be synonymous with the StingRay bass.

The StingRay's hardware varies from that of more traditional Fender-style electric basses in several ways. Angled string pull on the headstock is reduced by a distinctive 3+1 design, with three tuning machines on top and one on the bottom. Its six-bolt neck plate supplies more body to neck contact than the more common four-bolt arrangement, with the extra rigidity providing further body sustain. The StingRay is offered in both string through body and top load stringing depending on specification.

The StingRay line has traditionally featured an ash body construction along with a maple neck and either a maple or rosewood fingerboard, finished with an oil coat, as opposed to hard lacquer finishes as used by Fender.

== Notable players ==
- Jeff Ament of Pearl Jam
- Rex Brown of Pantera
- Justin Chancellor of Tool
- Johnny Christ of Avenged Sevenfold
- Tim Commerford of Rage Against the Machine
- Joe Dart of Vulfpeck
- John Deacon of Queen
- Kim Deal of Pixies
- Paul Denman of Sade
- Bernard Edwards of Chic
- Dave 'Phoenix' Farrell of Linkin Park
- Flea of the Red Hot Chili Peppers
- Max Green of Escape The Fate
- Tom Hamilton of Aerosmith
- Mark Hoppus of Blink-182
- Louis Johnson
- Tony Levin of King Crimson and Peter Gabriel
- Jason Newsted formerly of Metallica
- Shavo Odadjian of System Of A Down
- Benjamin Orr of The Cars
- Pino Palladino
- Jaime Preciado of Pierce the Veil
- Trent Reznor of Nine Inch Nails
- Steven Severin of Siouxsie and the Banshees
- Dougie Thomson of Supertramp
- Robert Trujillo of Metallica
- Cliff Williams of AC/DC
- Chuck Wright of Quiet Riot
- Mark King of Level 42

== Gallery ==
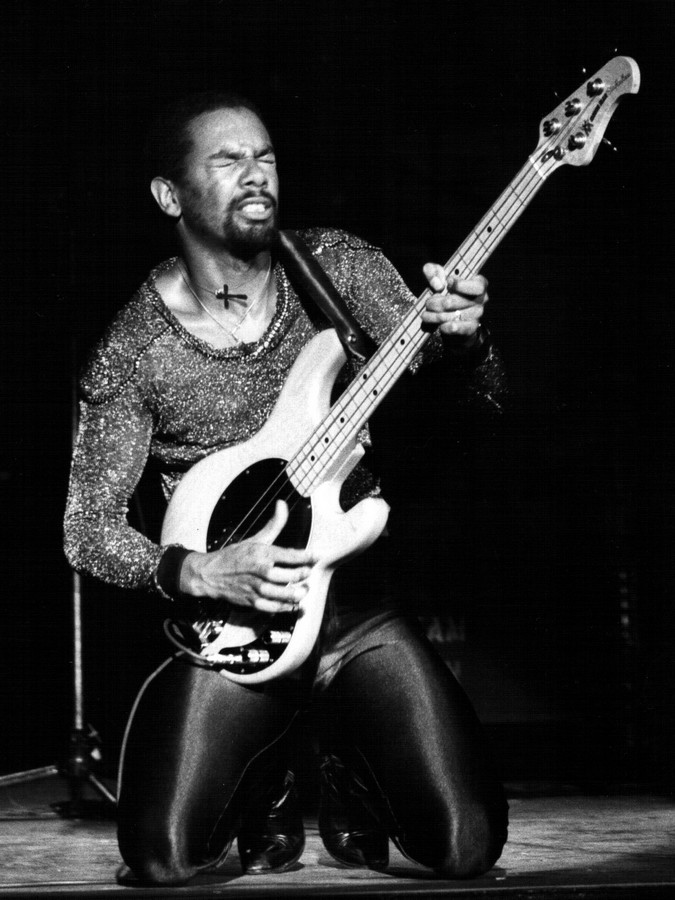
Louis Johnson

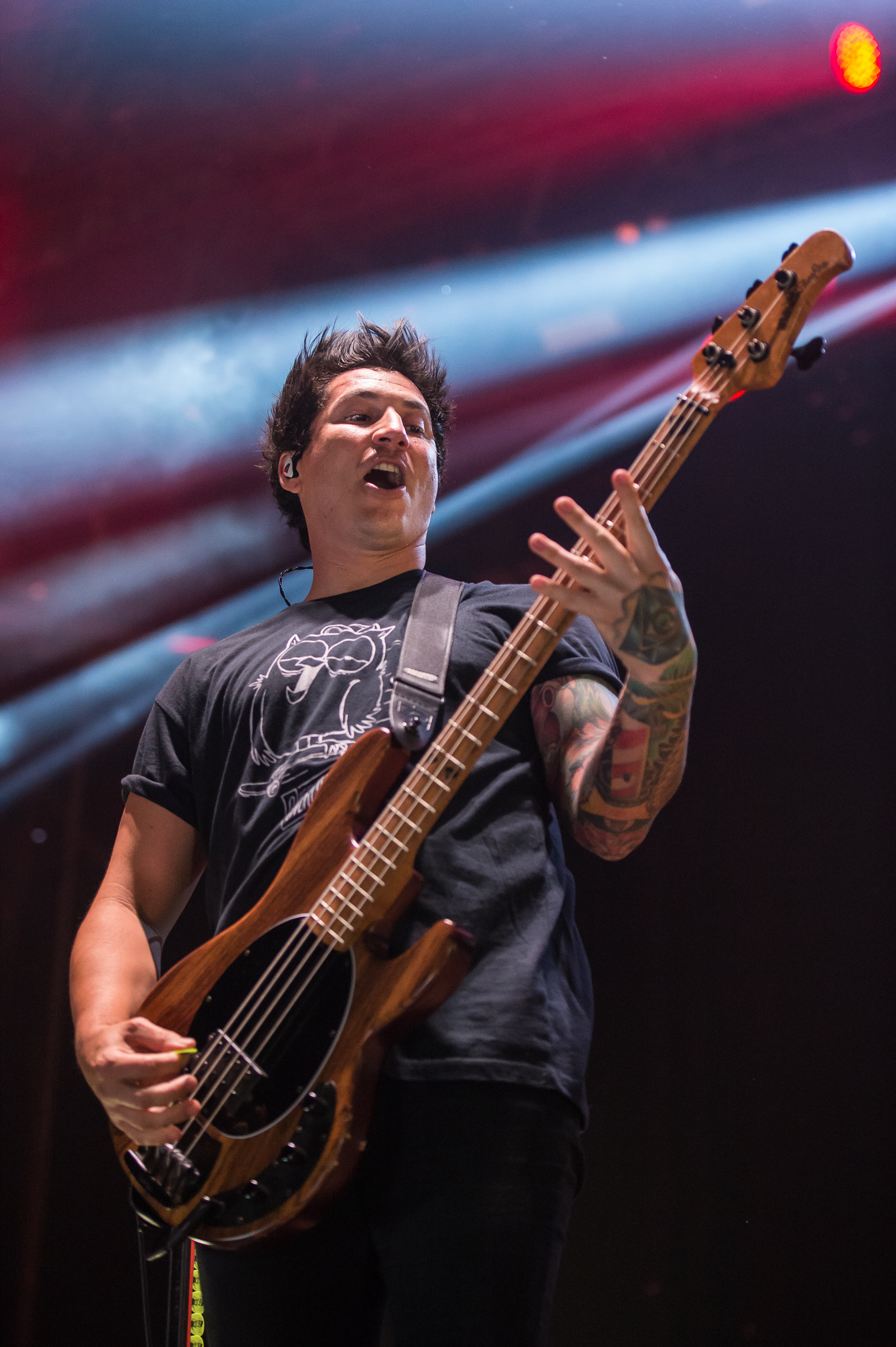
Pierce the Veil bassist Jaime Preciado

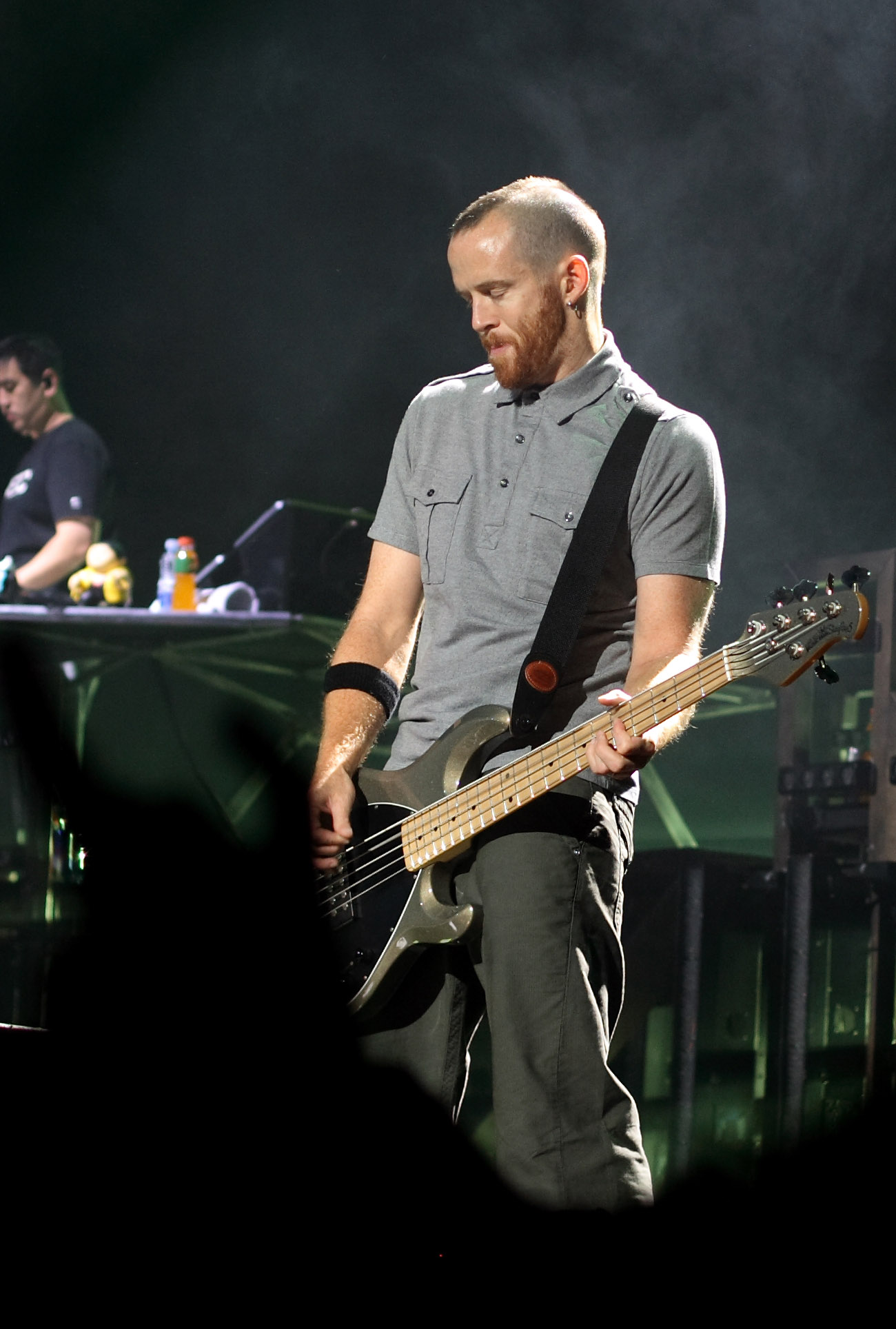
Linkin Park bassist Dave 'Phoenix' Farrell

Tony Levin playing a "StingRay 5" with Peter Gabriel in 2023
