= The Birth of Loud =

2019 book by Ian S. Port

The Birth of Loud: Leo Fender, Les Paul, and the Guitar-Pioneering Rivalry That Shaped Rock 'n' Roll
- Author: Ian S. Port
- Language: English
- Subject: Leo Fender, Les Paul
- Publisher: Charles Scribner's Sons
- Publication date: January 15, 2019
- Pages: 352
- ISBN: 978-1-5011-4165-2

The Birth of Loud: Leo Fender, Les Paul, and the Guitar-Pioneering Rivalry That Shaped Rock 'n' Roll is a 2019 book by Ian S. Port that examines the impacts of Leo Fender and Les Paul, and their rivalry, on rock music.
