= ASAT =

ASAT can mean:

- Anti-satellite weapon
  - ASM-135 ASAT, an air-launched anti-satellite multi-stage missile
- Aspartate aminotransferase, an enzyme in amino acid metabolism
- Association for Science in Autism Treatment
- G&L ASAT, an electric guitar
