= Music Man (company) =

American guitar and bass guitar manufacturer

- Type: Subsidiary
- Industry: Musical instruments
- Founded: 1974; 52 years ago in Fullerton, California
- Founders: Forrest White; Tom Walker; Leo Fender
- Headquarters: San Luis Obispo, California, United States
- Area served: Worldwide
- Key people: Brian Ball (CEO); Sterling Ball; Dudley Gimpel (lead designer)
- Products: Electric guitars, basses, amplifiers
- Parent: Ernie Ball Inc.
- Subsidiaries: Sterling, Source Audio
- Website: www.music-man.com

Music Man is an American guitar and bass guitar manufacturer. Originally formed in 1971 by Forrest White and Tom Walker, along with Leo Fender as a silent partner, the company started manufacturing electric and bass guitars under the Music Man name in 1974. In 1984 it was acquired by Ernie Ball Inc. and renamed Ernie Ball Music Man.

== History ==
=== Early years ===
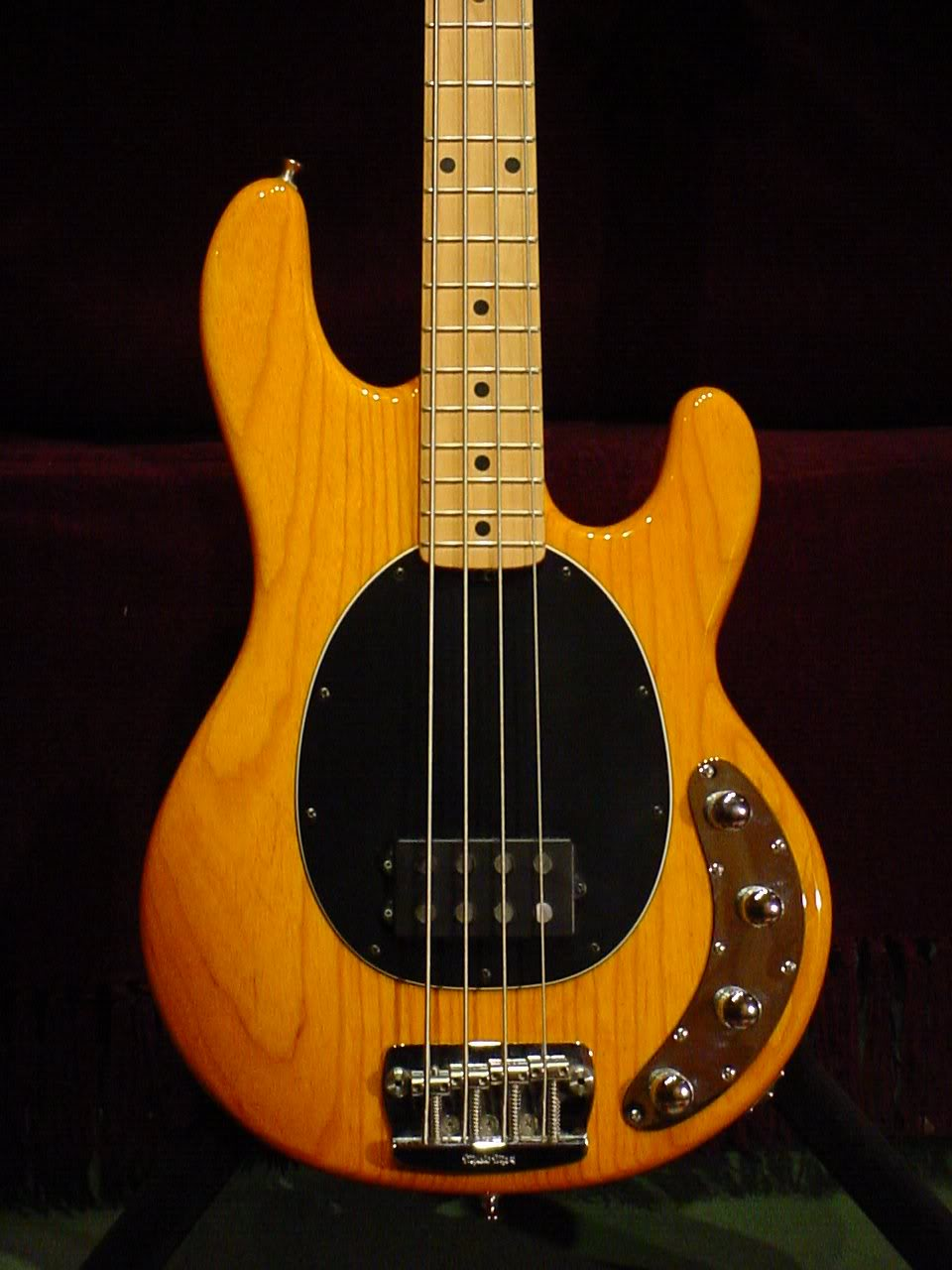
StingRay bass in Trans Gold finish, 2001 model

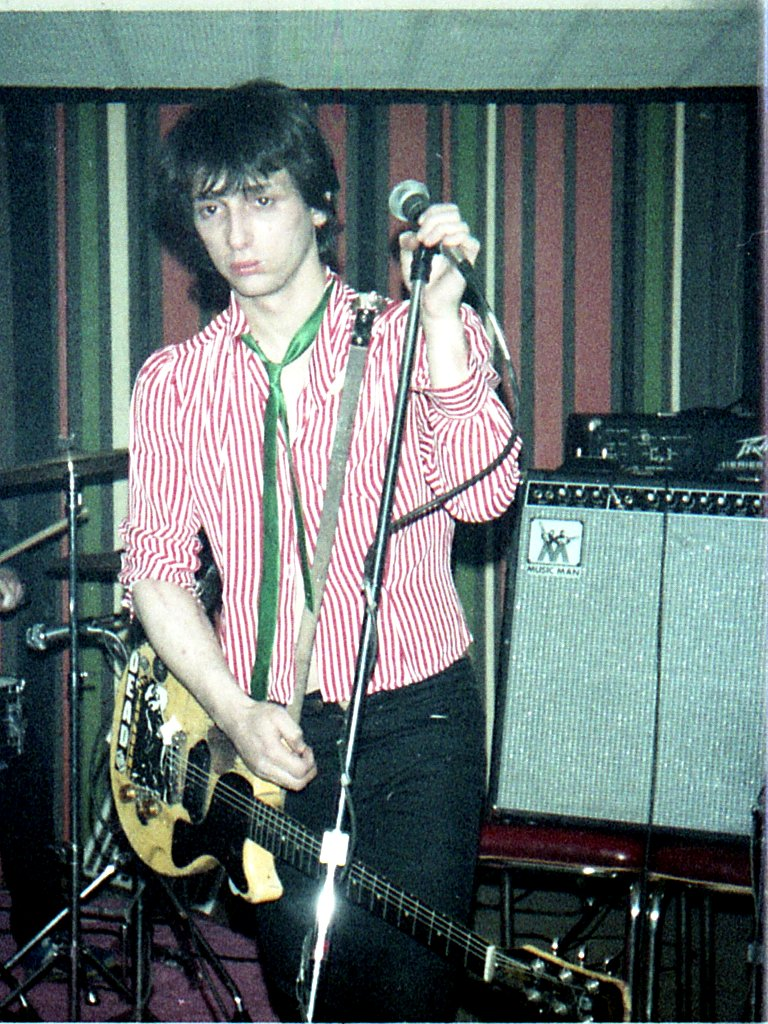
Johnny Thunders performing with a Music Man amplifier in 1979

In 1971, Forrest White and Tom Walker formed Tri-Sonix, Inc. Walker had previously been a sales representative at Fender. Walker approached Leo Fender about financial help in the founding. Because of a ten-year non-compete clause in the 1965 contract that sold the Fender companies to the CBS Corporation, Leo Fender became a silent partner.

White had worked with Leo Fender since 1954, in the very early days of the Fender Electric Instrument Manufacturing Company as the plant manager. Eventually, he became vice president, and stayed on after the company was sold to CBS, but grew unhappy with their management and resigned in 1966. Fender did not like the corporate name, so it changed first to Musitek, Inc., and in January 1974 the final name, Music Man, appeared. In 1974, the company started producing its first product, an amplifier designed by Leo Fender and Tom Walker called the "Sixty Five," a hybrid of tube and solid-state technology. The number of designs rapidly increased, and 15 of the 28 pages from the 1976 catalogue were dedicated to amplification.

In 1975, Fender's legal restriction expired and, after a vote of the board, he was named the president of Music Man. Fender also operated a consulting firm, CLF Research, in Fullerton, California. By 1976, it had built a manufacturing facility for musical instruments and was contracted to make Music Man products. In June 1976, production started on guitars and in August basses followed. These instruments were designed by Fender and White. The 1976 catalogue shows the first offerings: a two-pickup guitar, the StingRay 1, and the StingRay bass. Both instruments featured bolt-on neck designs. The basses featured a distinctive 3+1 tuner arrangement to help eliminate "dead spots," while the guitars came with a traditional, Fender-style 6-on-a-side tuner array. The StingRay Bass featured a single large humbucking pickup (located somewhat toward but not adjacent to the bridge) with a two-band fixed-frequency EQ. A row of string mutes sat on the bridge. Basses were produced in fretted and fretless versions.

Tom Walker played a large part in the design of the bass preamp. They were the first production guitar and basses to use active electronics which could boost levels in selected frequency bands. The preamps were coated with epoxy to prevent reverse engineering. The StingRay Bass sold well, but the guitar met with little success. In December 1978, a two-pickup bass was introduced called the Sabre (discontinued in 1991). A redesigned guitar bearing the same name followed. Both sold poorly.

=== Departure of Fender ===
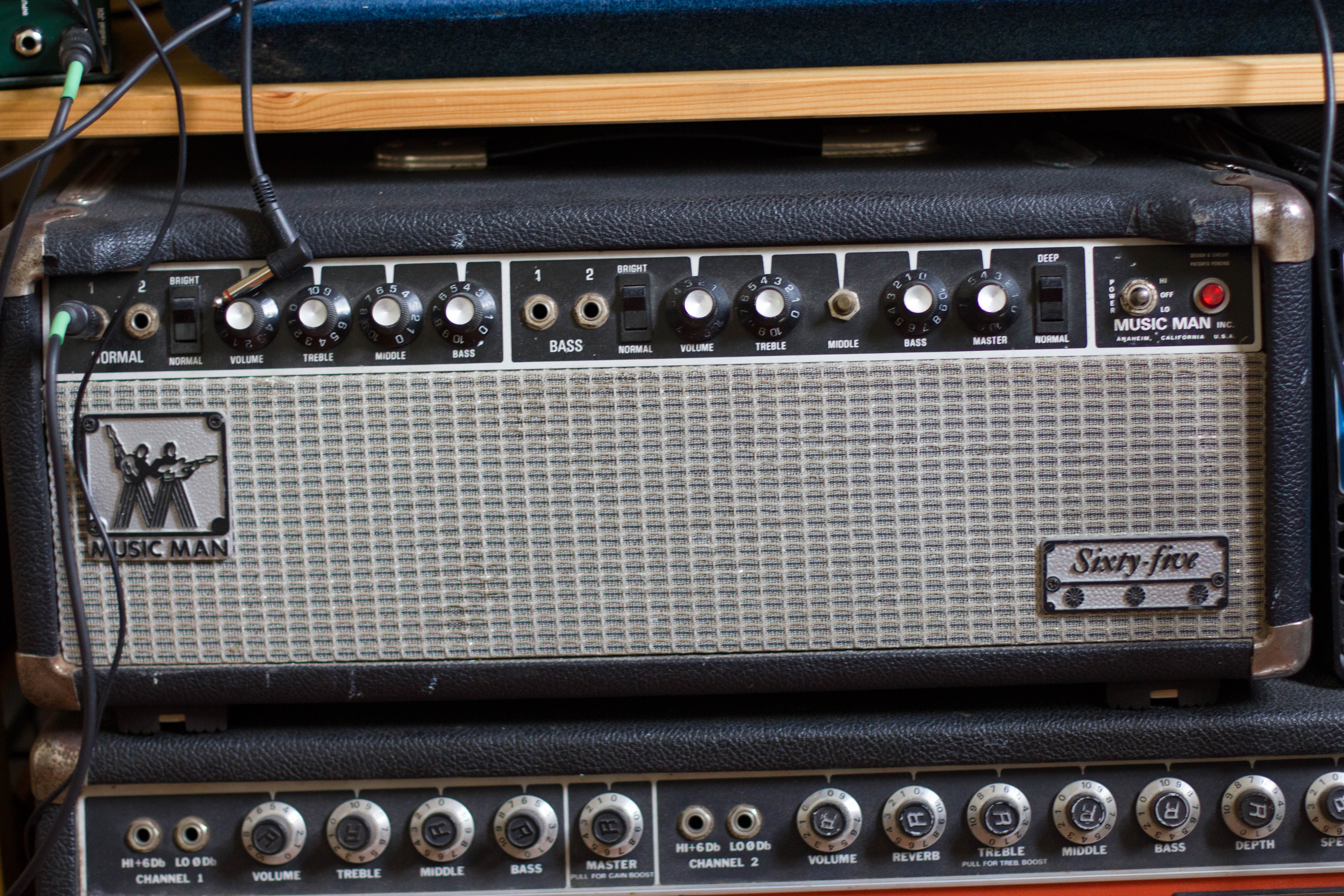
Music Man Sixty-Five tube amplifier head

CLF Research and Music Man were treated as separate companies. CLF was headed by Fender, while White and Walker headed Music Man. Fender made the guitars and basses, while White and Walker's company made the amplifiers and sold accessories. The instruments were made at CLF and shipped to the Music Man warehouse, where each instrument was inspected and tested. Problems with fibers in the finish caused Music Man's inspectors to reject a high percentage of the instruments, and return them to CLF for refinishing. Since Music Man did not pay CLF Research until the instrument finishes were deemed acceptable, a rift developed between CLF and Music Man over payment.

According to amp technician Kevin Nelson the rift culminated when it turned out that a whole batch of guitars was flawed, and when the neck was investigated, it was discovered that the whole batch had the truss rods mounted upside down. This eventually led to an office fist-fight between Tom Walker and Leo Fender over who was responsible for this error.

In November 1979, ties were cut with Leo Fender. Fender formed another company, partnering with former Fender company designer George Fullerton to form G&L Musical Instruments. G&L was incorporated in May 1980, although some early models with the moniker "G&L" have body dates from March 1980. A contract was given to Grover Jackson to build bass bodies and assemble the instruments with CLF necks and the remaining CLF hardware. When CLF stopped making necks Jackson made those also.

Given this climate, the StingRay guitar was quietly dropped from the line, while the Sabre guitar production continued until 1984. A graphite-neck StingRay Bass debuted in 1980. Fender had been opposed to the idea. The guitar was called the Cutlass (with a 'Cutlass II' variant with two pickups) and had a neck made by Modulus and new translucent finishes. The new guitars were unable to turn the financial tide and by 1984 the company was near bankruptcy. Music Man was sold to Ernie Ball on March 7, 1984. Music Man's remaining physical assets were sold on June 1, 1984. The production of amplifiers, which were manufactured at a separate factory, ceased.

=== Ernie Ball Music Man ===
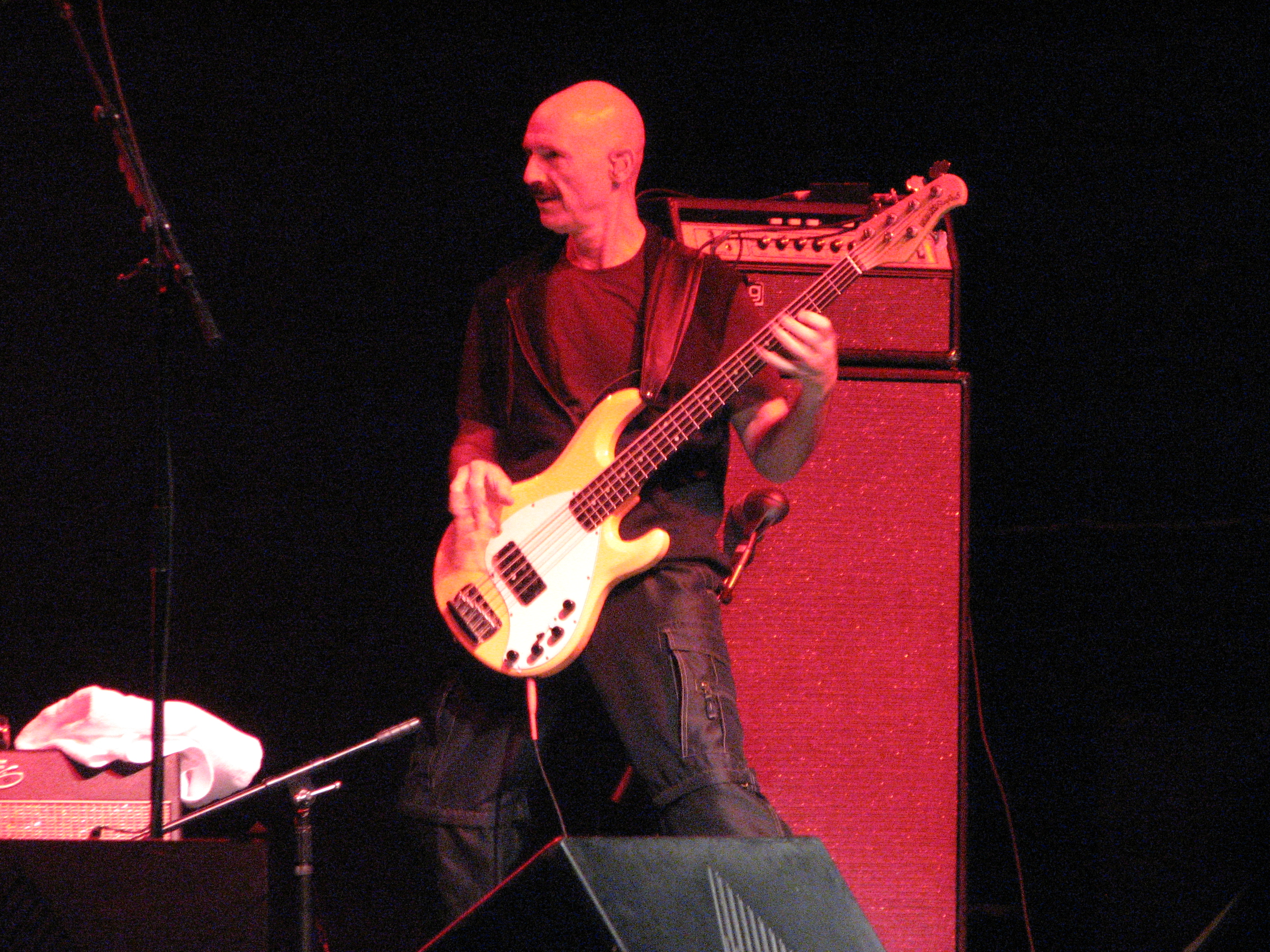
Tony Levin playing a Stingray 5

Ernie Ball started producing a modern acoustic bass in 1972 under the name Earthwood. Sterling Ball, Ernie's son, was an acquaintance of Fender and helped beta-test early Music Man models. Sterling took control of the Ernie Ball company in 1974.

Under Sterling's direction, Ernie Ball acquired Music Man. The deal included trademarks, inventory, and a warehouse, but no factory. A factory was built with the help of Dudley Gimpel, and instrument production began in 1985. The first Ernie Ball Music Man StingRay bass hit the market soon after.

Ernie Ball Music Man improved their visibility in the guitar market with a succession of new guitar models, which were largely player-endorsed. They also introduced a series of new electric bass models.

In July of 2026, Ernie Ball Purchased Source Audio, Making Source Audio a subsidiary of Ernie Ball Music Man.

== Instruments ==
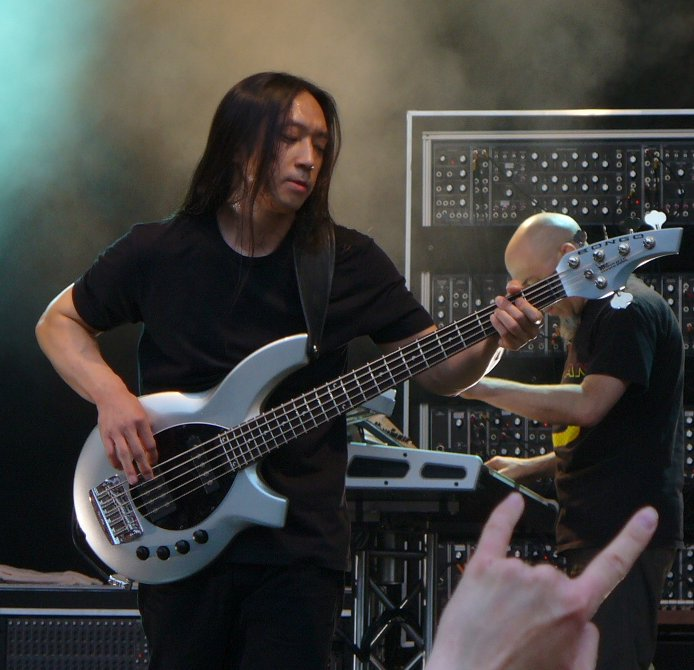
John Myung playing a Music Man Bongo bass

Music Man introduced the Sterling bass as a smaller, lighter alternative to the StingRay in 1993. The Sterling also had a slimmer neck profile with 22 frets and a triple-coil pickup with a 3 way switch. The pickup could operate as a standard Humbucker in series and parallel mode and utilized a "phantom-coil" when in single coil mode.

2003 saw the introduction of the Music Man Bongo Bass, the result of a partnership with DesignworksUSA, a design firm better known for its work with BMW. Initially available in 4- and 5-string versions, a 6-string was added in 2007. This bass features a basswood body with "moon"-shaped inlays. It has a four-band active EQ powered by an 18V supply. The Bongo was initially made available with the choice of HS (humbucker/single-coil), HH (dual humbuckers), and H (single humbucker) pickup configurations. These pickup configurations were adopted on other Music Man models three years later, using a five-way pickup selector with coil-tap capabilities. In early years, all Bongo pickup variations were also available with piezoelectric pickups incorporated into the bridge in addition to the regular neodymium pickups. Over time the number of pickup variations was reduced and the current (as of 2026) Bongo range is available only in the HH configuration.

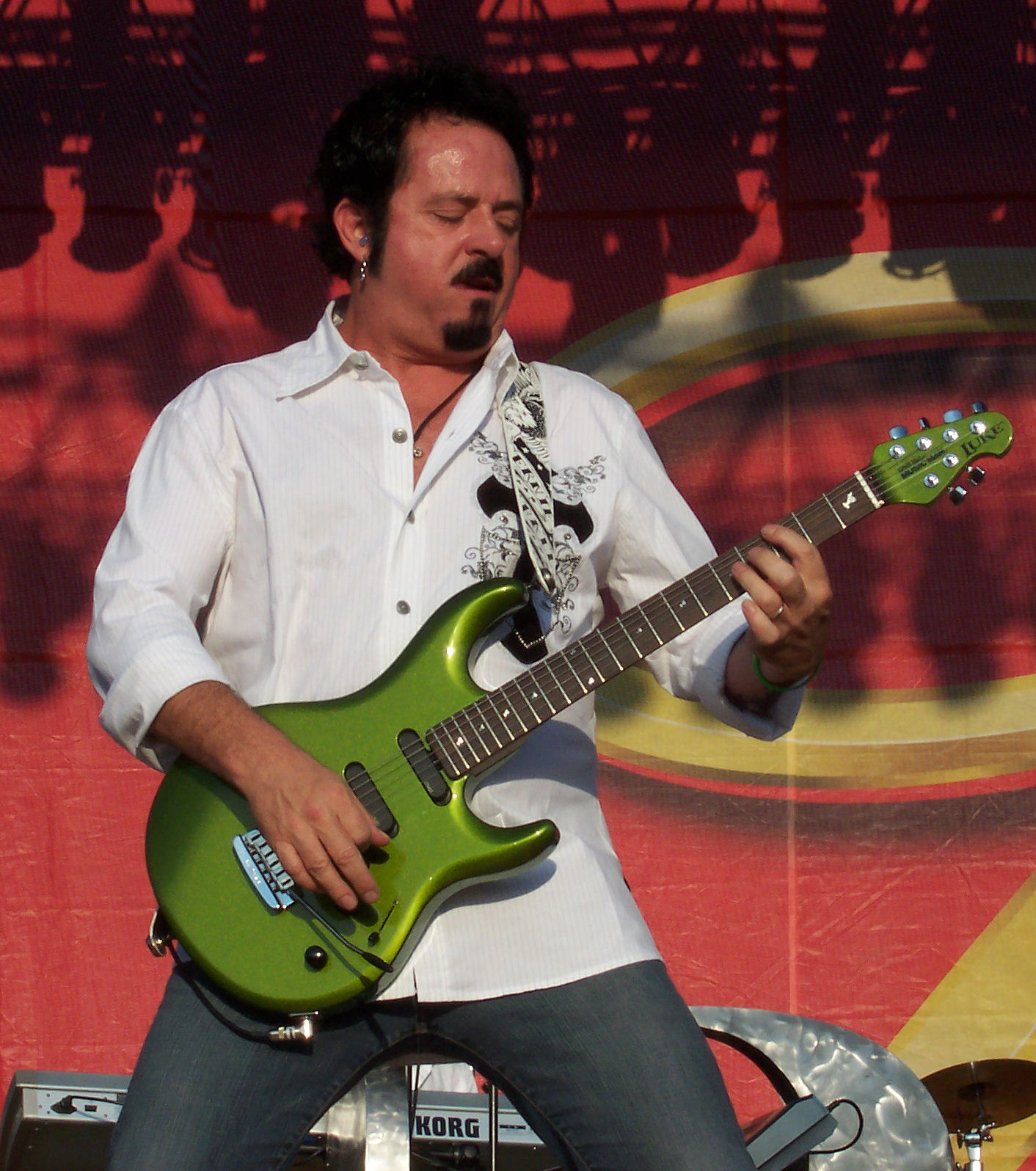
Steve Lukather playing the Limited Edition "Dargie Delight" version of his signature model guitar

In 2009, Music Man introduced the Big Al bass, based on the Albert Lee signature guitar, with an 18V-powered 4-band EQ, active/passive switching, series/parallel pickup wiring and three single-coil pickups with neodymium magnets. In 2010, the 'Big Al' bass came in a five-string version with the choice of H and SSS pickup configurations.

Introduced in 2018, the StingRay Special series includes revamped versions of the StingRay and StingRay 5 basses with new pickups and an 18-volt preamp.

=== Entry-level versions ===
In the late 1990s, demand for cheaper versions of Music Man instruments had increased, and other companies had begun to exploit this market gap by producing replica instruments in various East-Asian countries. Music Man responded by licensing its designs to HHI/Davitt & Hanser, launching OLP (Officially Licensed Products) to give Music Man market coverage in this price point. This agreement continued until 2008.

As a replacement for the OLP instruments, the company developed an in-house line of guitars and basses. Initially branded as S.U.B. for "Sport Utility Bass," this became the non-acronym "SUB" after two models of six-string guitar were launched. This mid-range line, with production cost one-third to one-half less than the "standard" Music Man instruments, was launched in 2003. Produced at the same facilities as the Music Man models, the major defining factors of the SUBs were a non-angled "slab" body finished with a textured (non-polished) paint, as well as necks with a matte painted back instead of the "oil and wax" finish applied to the higher-end models. Savings were realized largely from reduced production time, as opposed to cutting the quality of the wood, hardware, or electronics, allowing the SUB lines to achieve their price-point. The product was a success. The SUB models were eventually discontinued in September 2006. Sterling Ball commented that, due to the quickly growing $1,000+ segment of the guitar industry, there were fewer and fewer SUBs in production each year.

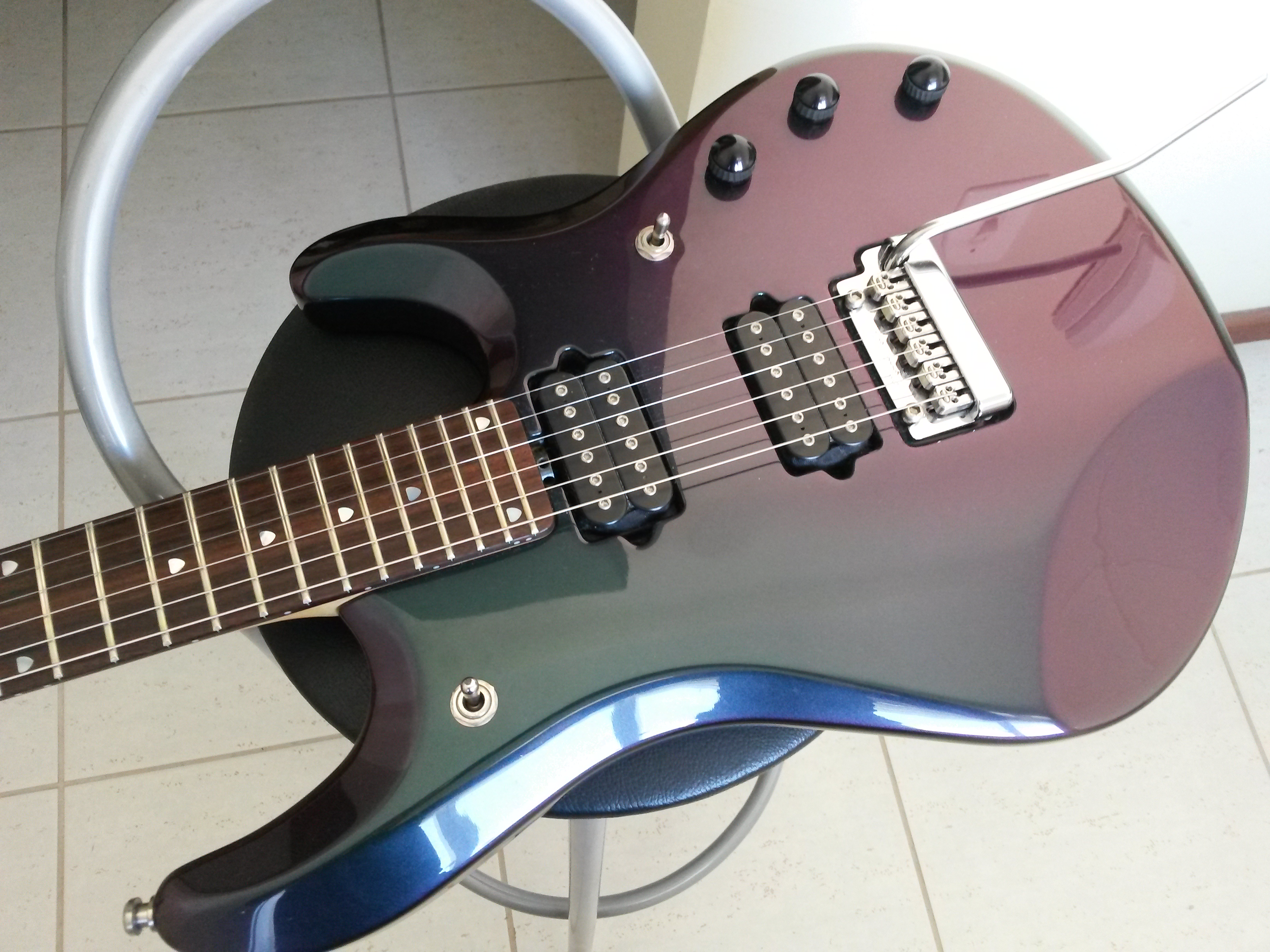
First John Petrucci signature model, 2001

In 2009, as a replacement for the SUB line, Music Man licensed Praxis Musical Instruments to build a new import budget brand, Sterling by Music Man. In 2012, Praxis expanded this line with the "Sterling By Music Man SUB Series" to compete with other sub-$300 USD "beginner" instruments. They were produced in Indonesia and other Far East countries using "non-standard" woods (i.e. not typically thought of as "tonewoods") to keep production costs low.

=== Signature models ===
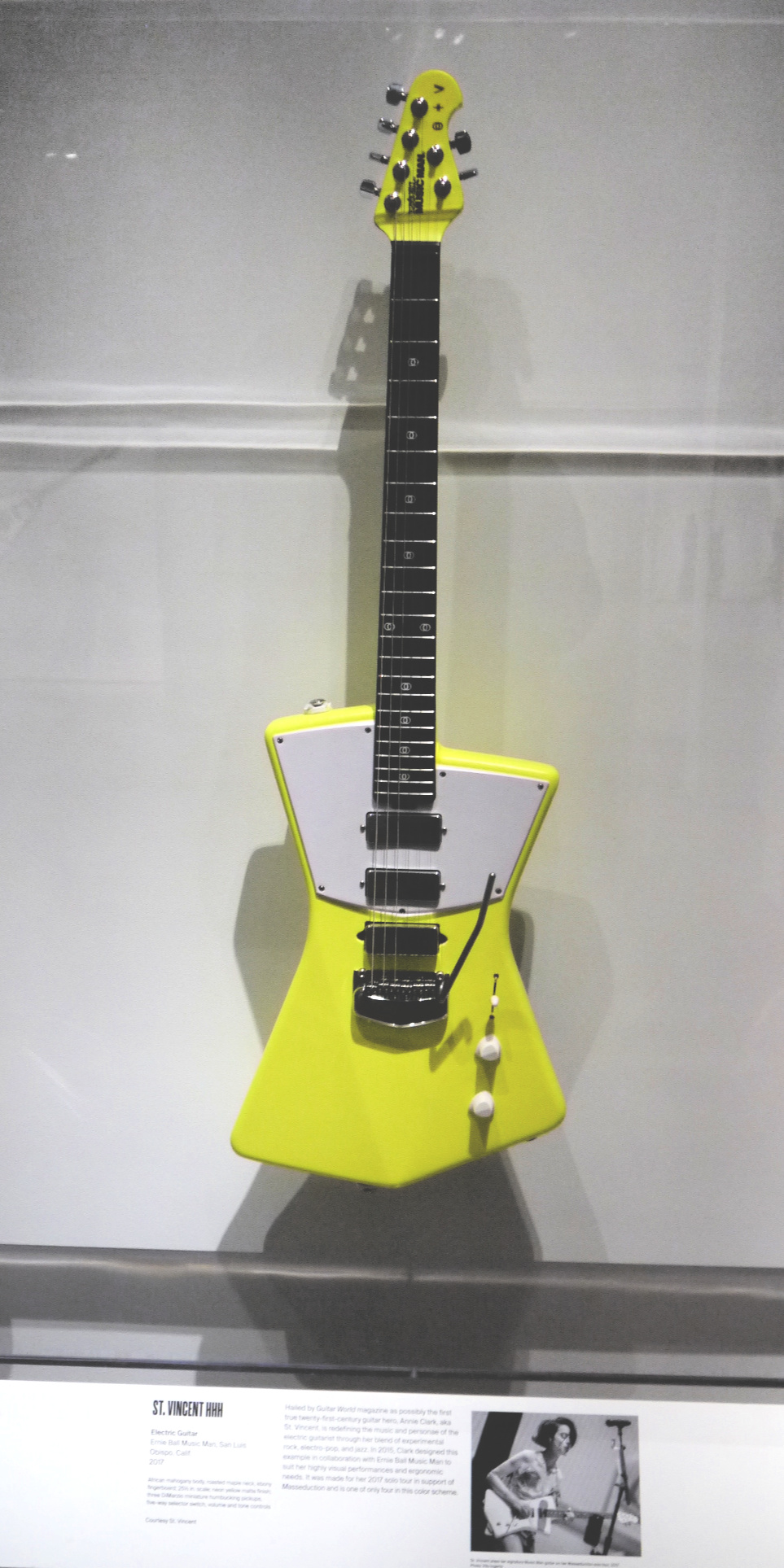
Anne Clark's signature Ernie Ball Music Man St. Vincent HHH guitar

In March 2016, Ernie Ball announced that St. Vincent had designed a signature Music Man guitar. It was originally released as the St. Vincent HHH signature model with three mini-humbuckers in a signature Vincent Blue finish, a paint color which Clark herself had personally hand-mixed and selected, as well as in black. A St. Vincent HH signature model was released in 2018 featuring two humbuckers in place of the three mini-humbuckers on the original. In 2021, a new St. Vincent Goldie signature model was released, featuring three gold foil mini-humbucker pickups, a reverse matching finish headstock, redesigned pickguard shape in 3-ply parchment, a roasted maple neck, and stainless steel frets.

The Mariposa model was launched in 2019 with Omar Rodríguez-López. It has an okoume body in an angular shape with a laser-etched floral pickguard, and two custom humbuckers featuring two volume knobs with a tethered tone circuit, which creates variations in treble response when the pickups are set at different levels.

In 2022, the Kaizen model was launched in collaboration with Tosin Abasi, a multi-scale 6- or 7-string guitar with an “infinity radius” fingerboard and Heat Treated (HT) humbuckers.

In 2025, the Stingray II model was introduced in collaboration with Cory Wong, a variation of the classic Stingray bass design but in electric guitar form. It features an ergonomic redesigned body, and signature Cory Wong HT humbucker pickups.. The Stingray II model is now sold in the Grilver variation, a collaboration with bass player Dave LaRue.
