= Source Audio =

- Type: Private
- Industry: Musical instruments
- Founded: 2006
- Headquarters: Woburn, Massachusetts
- Area served: Global
- Owner: Ernie Ball Inc.
- Website: sourceaudio.net

Source Audio is a guitar effects pedal company that was founded in Woburn, Massachusetts in 2006. They produce modular effects pedals for electric guitar and bass, such as the Nemesis Delay, Ventris Dual Reverb, and Collider Delay+Reverb, as well as the C4 Synth, a modular rack synthesizer in pedal format, the Aftershock Bass Distortion, and the EQ2, a 10-band parametric equalizer with a plug-in style desktop interface. They are also the creators of the Hot Hand Wireless Effects Controller, a device worn around the finger that uses an accelerometer to send expression signal to an effect like an envelope filter. Source Audio mainly uses DSP (Digital Signal Processing) to create their effects, and are known to program their own processor chips.

== History ==
Source Audio was founded in 2005 by Roger Smith (president) and Jesse Remignanti (vice president of engineering), while they worked together at the semiconductor firm, Analog Devices. Chief Scientist Bob Chidlaw, owner of two digital signal processing patents at Kurzweil Music Systems, and Chief Operating Officer C. Hunter Boll, former managing director at Thomas H. Lee Partners, joined shortly thereafter.

Source Audio's initial innovation was the Hot Hand Motion Controlled Wah Filter. The Hot Hand Motion Controller Ring converts hand movement into a digital signal using an accelerometer, a technology pioneered by Analog Devices. The ring combined with the Motion Controlled Wah Filter pedal produces effects similar to the Dunlop Cry Baby Wah, a pedal made famous by players like Jimmy Page and Jimi Hendrix. The unit offers 11 different wah filters, including classic wah, low pass, band pass, multi peak—and volume swell, which produce a wide range of wah effects.

SA followed the Motion Controlled Wah Filter with the Motion Controlled Phaser/Flanger pedal. Like the Wah, the Phaser/Flanger is compatible with the Hot Hand Wireless Adapter and offers multiple tone options. The Source Audio Phaser/Flanger offers both LFO and Envelope Follower filters.

In 2008 Source Audio released the Soundblox Series, four Hot Hand compatible pedals. The Sounblox Tri-Mod Wah, Phaser, and Flanger offer effects similar to the original pedals, but package them in a smaller, easier to use format.

The Soundblox Series also includes the Soundblox Multiwave Distortion, a pedal that incorporates both multi band and single band processing and produces several unique distortion tones. In total the pedal offers 21 different distortion types ranging from standard distortion to synth-like octave and foldback distortions.

At the 2010 NAMM Show SA introduced the Soundblox Pro Series. The Soundblox Pro Series offers the same effect types as the corresponding Soundblox pedals, but also include 6 user presets, a 7-band graphic EQ, a MIDI input and the capability to “morph” from one user preset to another with an expression pedal. 2010 also marked Source Audio’s entry into the bass effects pedal market with the Soundblox and Soundblox Pro Multiwave Bass Distortion pedals. The Bass Multiwave incorporates the same signal processing method as the Soundblox Pro Multiwave Distortion for the guitar but adapts it to fit the lower frequency range of the bass guitar.

The Source Audio Collider combines 12 delay and reverb effects from Source Audio's Nemesis Delay and Ventris Dual Reverb pedals, meshing them into one compact housing with substantial power and simple controls. The Collider’s control surface makes it easy to mix-and-match any two-engine combination of delay and reverb.

In July 2026, Source Audio was acquired by Ernie Ball Inc.
