= Dale Hyatt =

American luthier

External videos
- Oral History, Dale Hyatt talked about learning to pass off the promises made by other salesmen and to make his own way. Interview date March 20, 2007, NAMM Oral History Library

Dale Hyatt (December 10, 1925 – March 28, 2013) was an American salesman and marketing person who was a longtime associate of Leo Fender and George Fullerton.

Hyatt joined the Army Air Forces in 1944, and served as a tail gunner on a B-17 bomber. He completed 25 missions, and was shot down once over occupied France, but was able to make his way back to Allied lines and successfully returned to his bomber group.

Hyatt began working for Leo Fender in January, 1946, upon returning from World War II. He left Fender Music when Leo Fender sold the business to CBS in 1965, and rejoined Fender and George Fullerton when the three founded G&L Musical Instruments. Hyatt was the father of and marketing strategist behind G&L's highly collectible Broadcaster model; during its only production period from May 1985 through May, 1986, 869 guitars were made. Hyatt retired from G&L on November 4, 1991, about eight months following the death of his close friend Leo Fender.

Hyatt resided in Hawkins, Texas, prior to his death and owned one of the few known guitars to be signed by Leo Fender.
