= Forrest White =

American businessman (1920–1994)

Forrest Fred White (21 May 1920 in West Virginia - 22 November 1994 in Banning, California) was an American musical instruments industry executive, best known for his association with Fender Musical Instruments Corporation and as co-founder of the Music Man company.

White began working at Fender on 20 May 1954, eventually becoming its vice president. Leo Fender named a line of student amplifiers and steel guitars after him in 1955. White remained with the company until December 1966. He was also a partner with Fender in the Music Man company after both men left Fender.

Later in 1994, White wrote and published a book called "Fender: The Inside Story" (ISBN 0879303093, Pub Group West) on the relationship he had with Leo Fender.
