= Ernie Ball Inc. =

American instrument and guitar accessory company

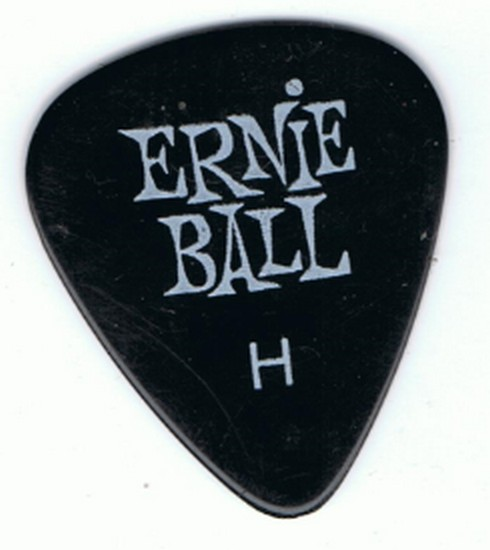
- Ernie Ball logo on a guitar pick
- Type: Private
- Industry: Musical instruments
- Founded: 1962
- Headquarters: San Luis Obispo, California, United States
- Area served: Global
- Key people: Ernie Ball; Sterling Ball; Brian Ball
- Products: Strings
- Divisions: Music Man
- Website: ernieball.com

Ernie Ball Inc. is an American instrument and guitar accessory company based in San Luis Obispo, California. The brand was started by Ernie Ball in 1962 as a custom line of guitar strings. The company manufactures and sells guitars through Ernie Ball Music Man.

== Background ==
Roland Sherwood "Ernie" Ball was a professional musician in Los Angeles and played guitar in the United States Air Force Band during the Korean War. In the 1950s, he began working as a studio musician and teacher.

Sometime in 1957 or 1958, Ball opened a music store in Tarzana, California. He claimed it was the first shop in the United States to sell guitars exclusively. When music sales representatives criticized him for refusing to sell drumsticks and other musical equipment, Ball replied, "I just want to sell guitars." Within the next two years he opened additional stores in Canoga Park and Thousand Oaks. Ball and his company appeared in a 1965 television commercial for the Xerox 813 photocopier.

=== Guitar string innovations ===
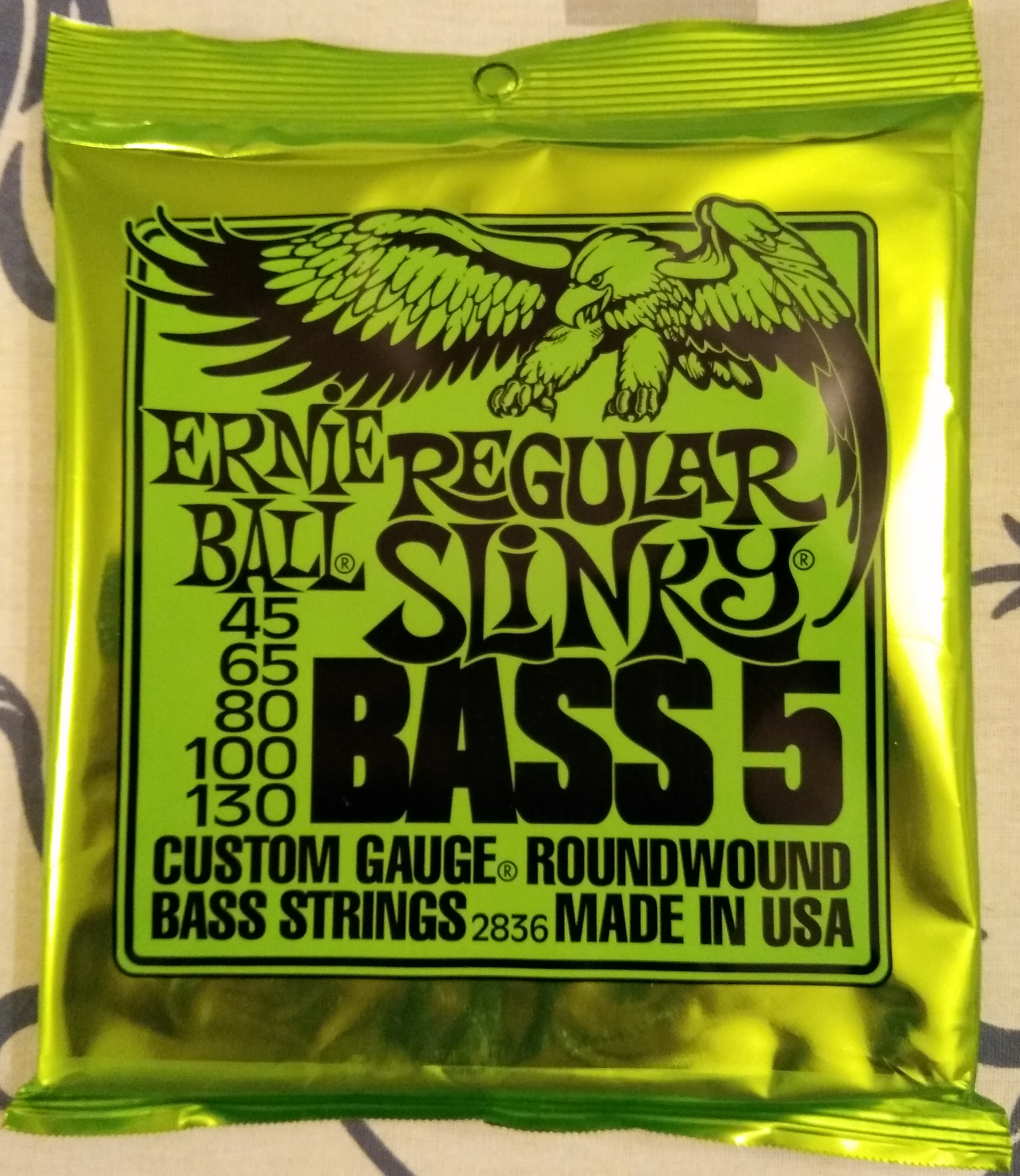
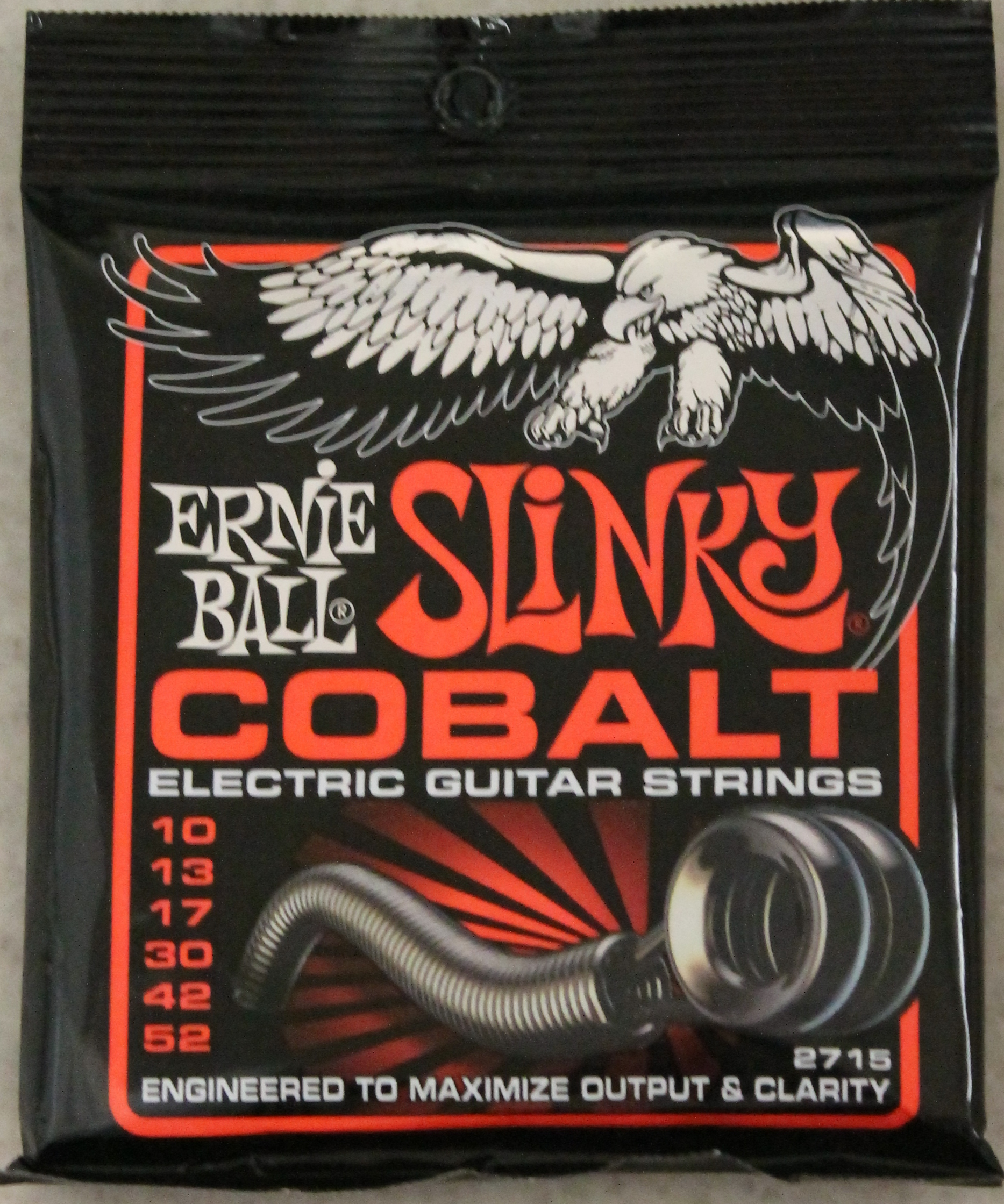
Slinky strings are known for their characteristic packaging

With the guitar-based rock revival of the 1960s, Ball noticed that beginner students were having difficulty playing the bestselling Fender #10 medium gauge strings, particularly in holding down or bending the stiff .028" third ("G") string. At the time, it was common for a set of strings to have a third string that was "wound". He approached the Fender company with the problem, suggesting a lighter gauge, but was rebuffed. Ball convinced a string manufacturer to make him custom sets with a 24-gauge third string which he sold in his store. He would also order separate strings in various sizes and displayed them in a makeshift case allowing musicians to experiment in creating their own sets. Located not far from Hollywood, the store began to attract a large patronage of professional musicians, including The Beach Boys, Merle Travis, and The Ventures.

Ball also began to notice the practice of "slack stringing" among players who discarded the bottom sixth string and added a banjo first string on top. This resulted in an overall lighter gauge set with a plain third string. Again, he contacted Fender with a suggestion for a lighter set and was turned down. He then approached Gibson, who also turned him down. So, once again he ordered from the manufacturer naming the product the Ernie Ball Slinky. Slinky strings traveled the country with the professional musicians who used them and before long, Ball was receiving mail orders from individuals and stores.

The characteristic packaging of Ball's guitar strings was designed by Rolly Crump, a Disney Imagineer. Slinky strings went on to become popular with mainstream artists in the rock n' roll genre.

== Company growth ==
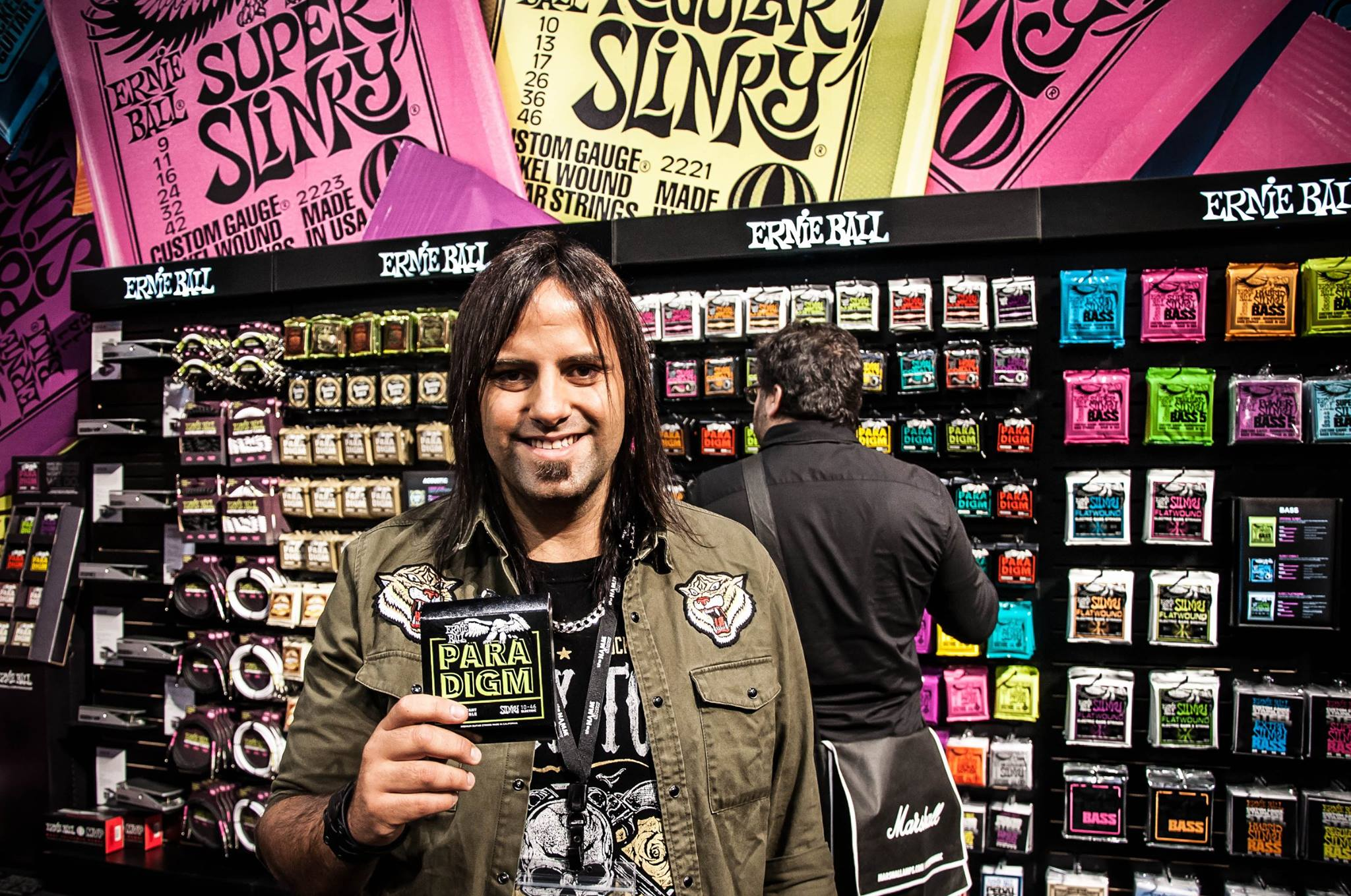
Luiyi Black Side as an Ernie Ball International Artist

In 1967, Ball decided to focus solely on strings and guitar accessories, and moved the business to Newport Beach. In 1972, the company manufactured its first guitar; the Earthwood acoustic-electric bass. Ernie Ball began producing a model in the early 1970s. His aim was to provide bass guitarists with a more acoustic-sounding instrument that would match better with the sound of acoustic guitars. Ball stated that "...if there were electric bass guitars to go with electric guitars then you ought to have acoustic basses to go with acoustic guitars." Ball said that "...the closest thing to an acoustic bass was the Mexican guitarron...in mariachi bands, so I bought one down in Tijuana and tinkered with it."

Ball collaborated with George William Fullerton, a former employee at Fender, to develop the Earthwood. Production of this instrument ceased in 1974, resuming a few years later under the direction of Ernie Ball's employee Dan Norton, until production finally ended again in 1985. The Earthwood acoustic bass guitar was quite large and deep in contrast to most instruments in current production, which gave it more volume, especially in the low register. The Ernie Ball company describes Ball's design as "an idea before its time"; the instrument was little used in acoustic musical performances until the late 1980s, when the acoustic basses were used in performances on the MTV Unplugged television program.

Sterling Ball, the son of Ernie, began working for the company at the age of 9. In 1973, he became a brand representative. In 1975, he was granted full control of the company. In 1979, the company relocated to San Luis Obispo to increase production capabilities.

In 1984, Ernie Ball acquired the guitar company Music Man. The deal included trademarks, inventory, and a warehouse, but no factory. A factory was built, and instrument production began in 1985.

In 2000, Ernie Ball was raided by the copyright lobby group the Business Software Alliance and accused of having unlicensed software installed at its premises. Following a court settlement, the BSA used Ernie Ball as an example in advertisements and industry publications; Sterling Ball was so offended at this treatment that he had all Microsoft software removed from Ernie Ball ("I don't care if we have to buy 10,000 abacuses...") and imposed an open-source software policy across the company.

In 2014, the company had 150 employees. In 2015, Brian Ball, son of Sterling, was promoted to president of the company. In 2019, he was made CEO.

== Ernie Ball Battle of the Bands ==
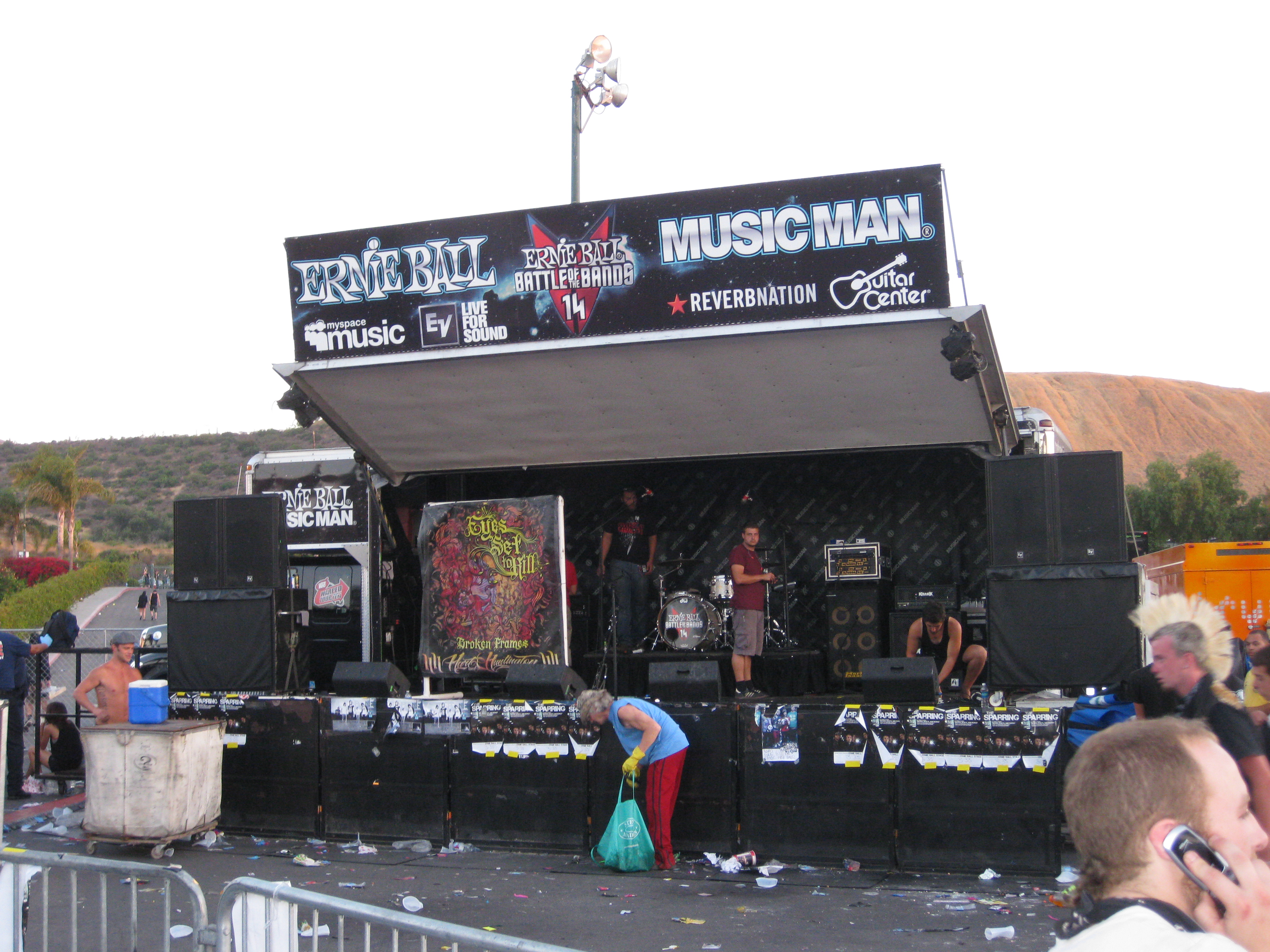
Ernie Ball stage at Warped Tour in 2010

Since 1997, Ernie Ball has sponsored a battle of the bands at Warped Tour. The event allows unsigned bands to compete for prizes and recognition on a prominent stage. The competition has helped launch the career of bands such as PVRIS and Nothing More.

The company also sponsored the Ernie Ball International Battle Of The Bands at Taste of Chaos. Local bands would vie for fan votes on the competition website, and a panel of judges would determine a winner from those who achieved the most votes. The winning band would then be invited to play a set at the festival.

== Media ==
In 2016, Audience premiered Ernie Ball: The Pursuit Of Tone, a documentary series profiling popular guitar players and how they established their unique sound. The show featured musicians such as Tom DeLonge, Billy Duffy, Buddy Guy, Hunter Hayes, and Mike Ness.

Ernie Ball also publishes Ernie Ball: String Theory, a web series that discusses the origin stories of well-known musicians, as well as the bi-monthly, audio-only podcast Striking a Chord.
