= G&L Musical Instruments =

American manufacturer of guitars and basses

- Type: Subsidiary
- Industry: Musical instruments
- Founded: 1980; 46 years ago
- Founder: Leo Fender and George Fullerton
- Defunct: 2025
- Headquarters: Fullerton, California, United States
- Area served: Worldwide
- Key people: David C. McLaren (Chairman); Phyllis Fender (Honorary Chairperson); John R. McLaren Jr. (Vice President)
- Products: Electric guitars, basses, effects units, BBE Sound Audio Technology Licensing
- Revenue: $18,768,358 (estimated)
- Number of employees: 65 (estimated)
- Parent: BBE Sound, Inc.
- Website: glguitars.com

G&L was an American guitar manufacturing company founded by Leo Fender, George Fullerton, and Dale Hyatt in 1980. G&L produced electric guitars and basses with designs based on some classic Fender instruments. The company also produced effects units for a short while such as the G&L Double Barrel Vari-Boost and the G&L Buckshot Overdrive. Notable players of G&L instruments include Carl Perkins and Jerry Cantrell.

== History ==
Leo Fender sold his eponymous company Fender in 1965. He designed and produced instruments for Music Man in the 1970s through his company CLF Research. When relations with Music Man soured, G&L was created to continue operations apart from Music Man. The G&L name comes from two founders' first names, George Fullerton and Leo Fender.

G&L instruments were similar to the classic Fenders, but with some Leo Fender modern innovations. They were built at the same facility on Fender Avenue in Fullerton, California that produced the early Music Man instruments. G&L instruments were not widely distributed but are highly regarded by many musicians and collectors. The relatively small scale of production further allowed for more custom options that were not possible on larger production lines.

After the death of Leo Fender in 1991, Fender's wife, Phyllis Fender, passed the management of G&L to John C. McLaren Sr. of BBE Sound. George Fullerton remained a permanent consultant until his death on July 4, 2009, and Leo's wife Phyllis remained as Honorary Chairperson of G&L until her death in July 2020.

In a print advertisement for G&L, Leo Fender claimed the G&L line of instruments were "the best instruments I have ever made."

According to G&L employees—including James Gay, Master Builder at the G&L Custom Shop—all production staff were furloughed on Monday, September 15, 2025, after several weeks without pay. Two weeks later, on September 29, 2025, all employees were formally terminated and issued severance packages. No official statement has been released by the company’s owners, the McLaren family, regarding G&L’s future. However, social media has been filled with speculation and unverified reports suggesting a possible sale of the company and its intellectual property, including rights to Leo Fender’s name and likeness.

On October 6, 2025, Fender Musical Instruments Corporation applied to trademark the mark "Leo Fender" with the United States Patent and Trademark Office and Leo Fender's name and likeness began to appear prominently on Fender's website. According to the California Secretary of State, G&L's parent company BBE terminated its corporate status with the state on October 28. By November, the interior of the G&L factory on Fender Avenue had been largely cleared out, with most of the equipment either sold or discarded.

== Innovations ==
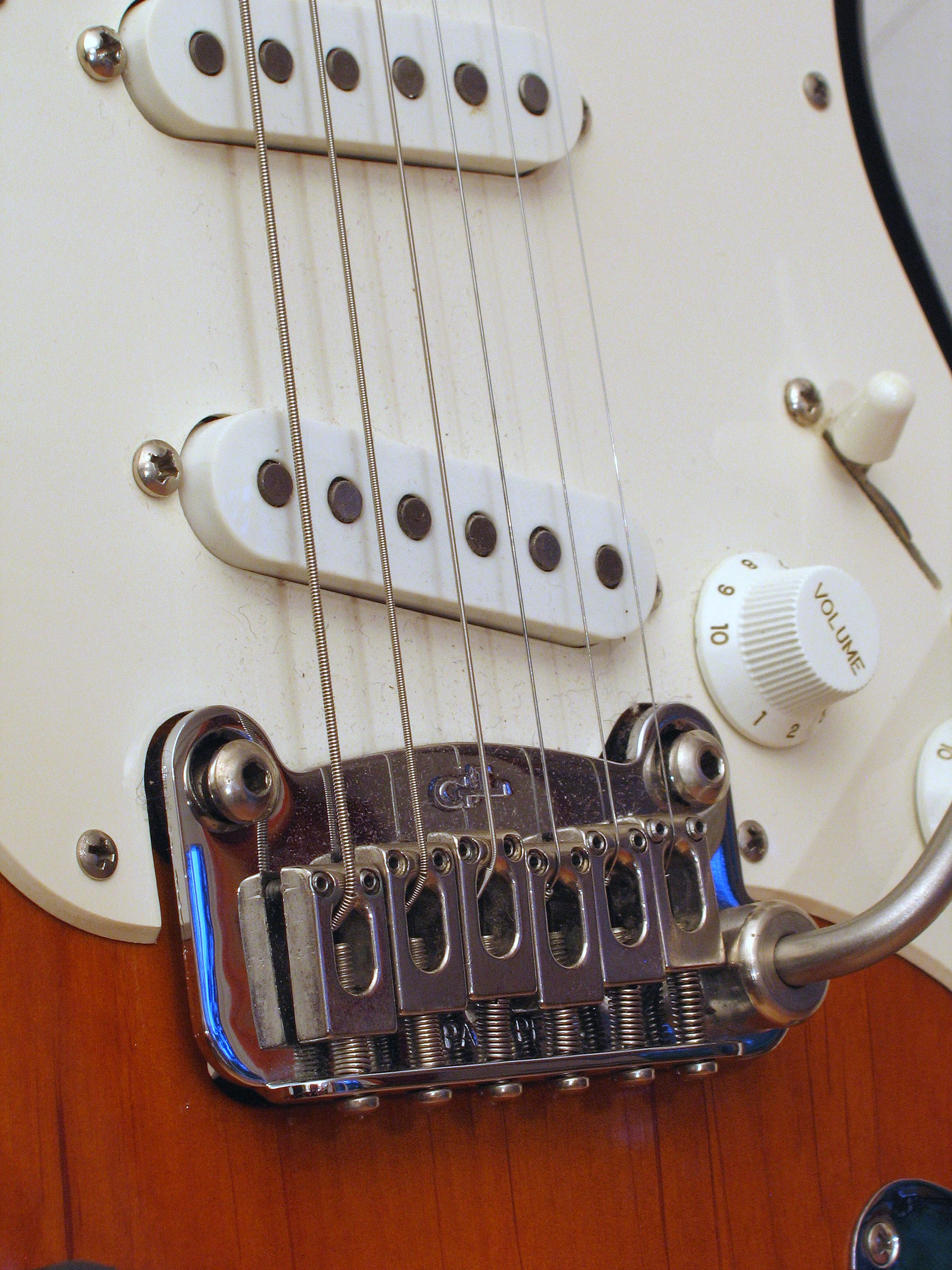
Dual-Fulcrum Vibrato

Leo Fender and George Fullerton created improved designs over the years, with the most advanced being featured in G&L instruments.:

- "Magnetic Field Design" (MFD) pickups use a ceramic bar magnet in combination with soft iron pole pieces with adjustable height, instead of the traditional Alnico magnet, and allow a player to set the pickup output per string, as opposed to the entire pickup as a whole in traditional single-coil pickup designs. MFDs are known for their distinctive tone, which combines clarity, high fidelity and power with an airy "sweetness".
- "Passive Treble and Bass" (PTB) electronics that allow treble and bass tones to be shaped separately.
- The "Dual-Fulcrum Vibrato" has two pivot points. The design aims to improve tuning stability, and according to some has a sound that is more mellow than a traditional bridge. It allows the player to bend notes up as well as down. See also Tremolo arm.
- The G&L "Saddle-Lock bridge" utilizes a small Allen screw on the side of the bridge, to reduce side-to-side movement of the individual string saddles. The design, and the bridge's beefy dimensions, aim to prevent loss of sustain due to this sideways motion by locking the saddles together.
- The "Tilt Neck Mechanism" designed and patented by George Fullerton. This feature is no longer used, and was a carryover from Music Man production.
- The "Bi-cut neck design" involved cutting the neck lengthwise perpendicular to where the fretboard is later installed, routing a channel for the truss rod, then gluing the two neck pieces back together. As G&L moved production to CNC machines, this method was phased out.

== Models ==
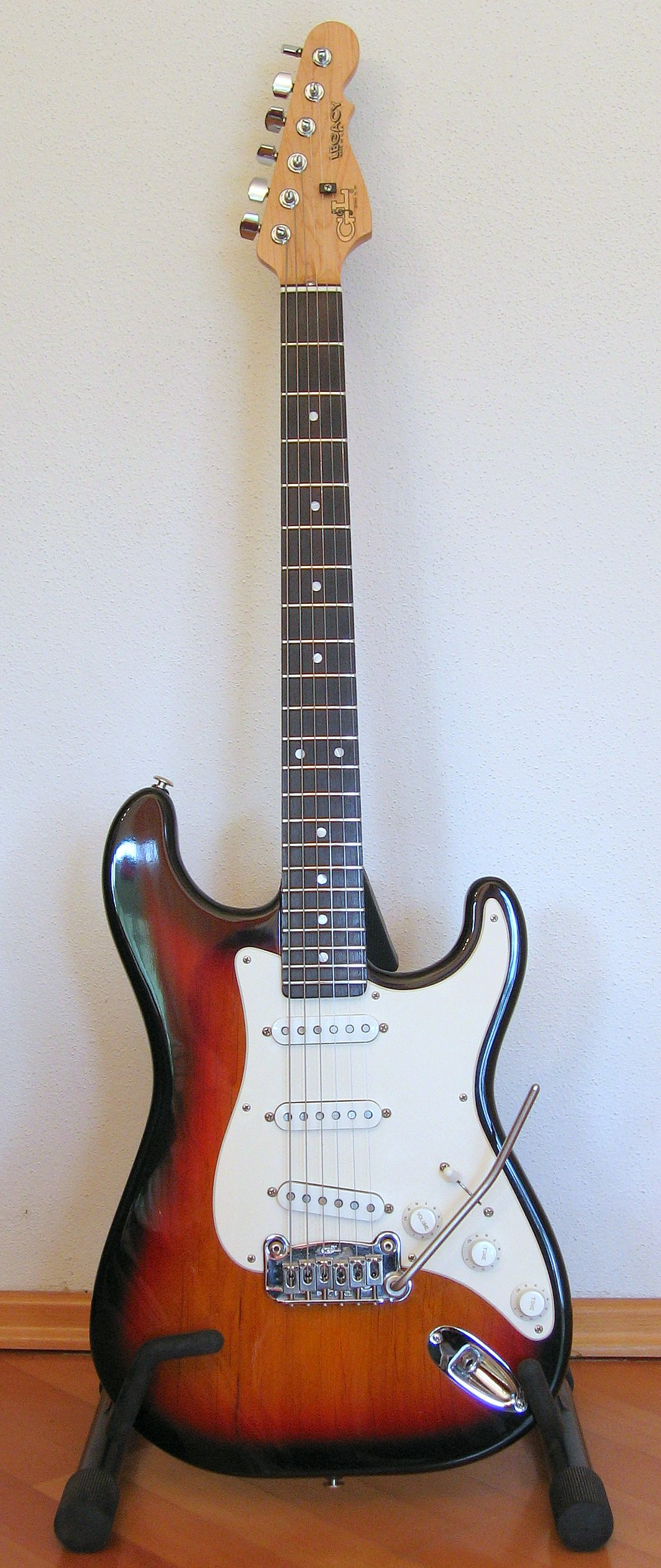
Legacy guitar

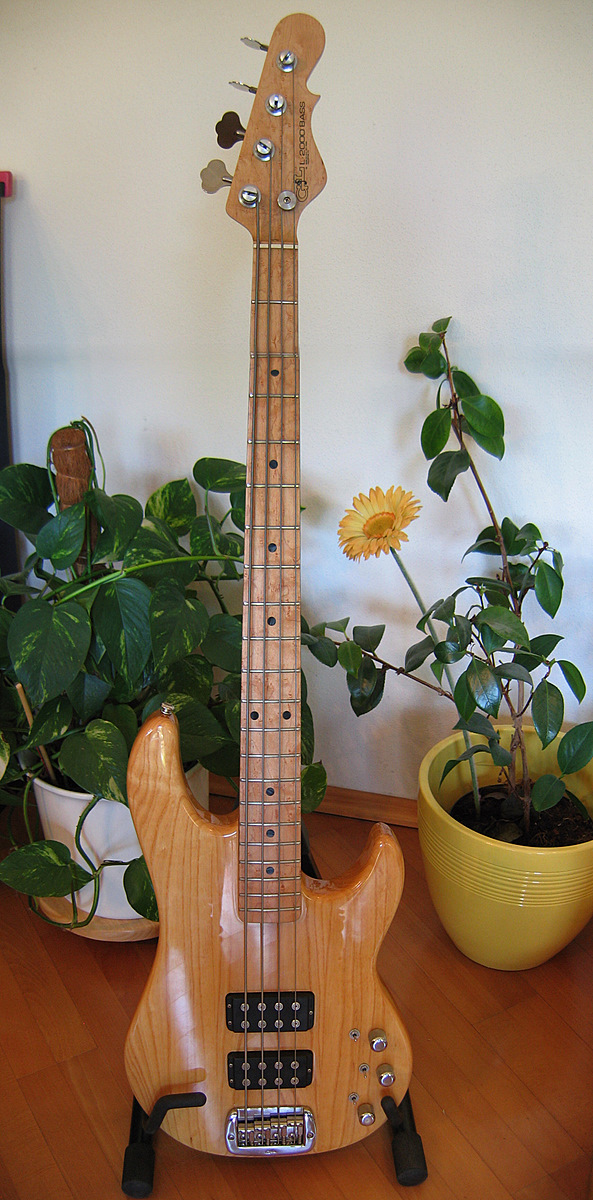
L2000 bass

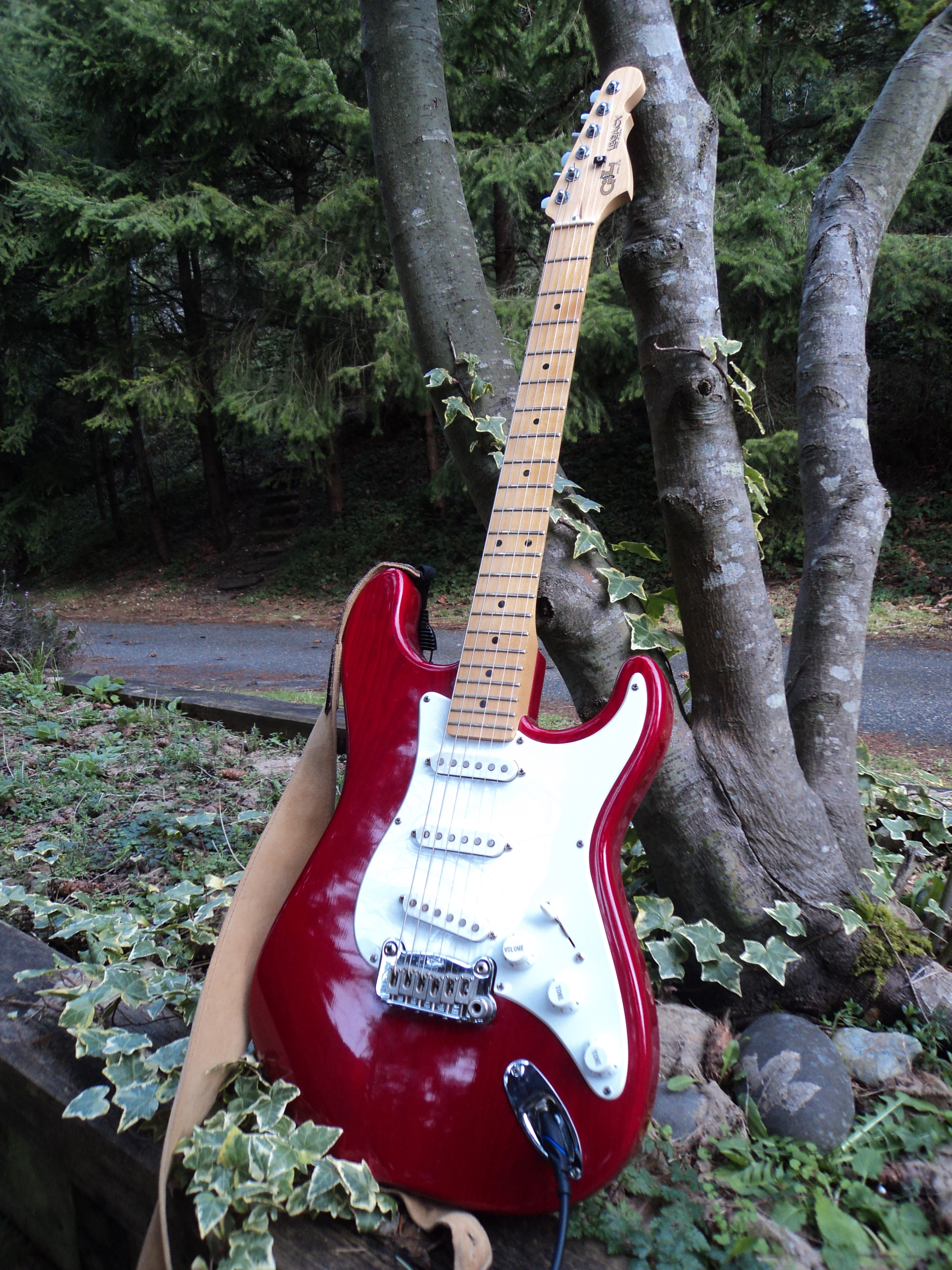
1992 G&L Legacy

In 2003, G&L introduced the Tribute series to the US market as a more affordable alternative to the USA built products. Tribute G&L's were initially made in Korea by Cort Guitars using US hardware, and electronics in many of the guitars. Some non-original parts were also used on value-based models, such as those sold exclusively through Guitar Center. The pickups used are all originally made by G&L in Fullerton, California. Production of the guitars has since moved to a Cort facility in Indonesia.

Before 2003, Tribute guitars were briefly produced in Japan for non-US markets, shifting to South Korea.

The Tribute series is offered in many of the same body shapes as their original creations although some use hardware and pickups designed by G&L but sourced in Asia. The Tribute SB-2 was offered briefly but was discontinued, however, it was reintroduced late 2006/early 2007. The JB-2 was introduced to the Tribute series at the same time.

As of 2020, the Tribute line contained many of the standard guitars from G&L including the Comanche, S-500, Legacy, various ASAT models, Doheny and others.

== Notable users ==
Along the most notable players of G&L instruments were Carl Perkins and Jerry Cantrell. Carl Perkins, who played a variety of guitar models throughout his career, used a G&L Broadcaster — a gift from Leo Fender — as his primary instrument during the final thirteen years of his life as seen performing That’s All Right on British television in 1987. Jerry Cantrell — vocalist and guitarist of Alice in Chains — has played several models since the 1980s, including his own signature Tribute Series Rampage and Superhawk. Cantrell can be seen playing a single-humbucker G&L Rampage in the music video for Alice in Chains' "Man In The Box".

- Tom Hamilton (Aerosmith)
- Ben Gibbard
- Gustavo Cerati
- Jerry Cantrell (Alice in Chains)
- Elliot Easton
- Marissa Paternoster
- Jake Cinninger
- Mark St. John
- Sean “Grasshopper” Mackowiak
- Mike Palm (Agent Orange)
- Carl Perkins
- Bill Callahan (Smog)
- Cassie Berman (Silver Jews)
- Erja Lyytinen

== Bibliography ==
- Fullerton, George (1993). Guitar Legends, The evolution of the Guitar from Fender to G&L. Fullerton: CENTERSTREAM Publishing. ISBN 0-931759-69-2.
- Fullerton, George (2005). George & Leo, How Leo Fender and I Built G&L Guitars. Milwaukee: Hal Leonard. ISBN 0-634-06922-5.
- Smith, Richard R. (2003–2009). Fender, The Sound Heard 'Round The World. Milwaukee: Hal Leonard. ISBN 978-1-4234-6279-8.
