= Leo Fender =

American inventor and founder of the Fender company (1909–1991)

- Fender in the 1980s
- Born: Clarence Leonidas Fender; August 10, 1909; Anaheim, California, U.S.
- Died: March 21, 1991 (aged 81); Fullerton, California, U.S.
- Occupation: Inventor
- Known for: Fender; Music Man; G&L Musical Instruments
- Notable work: Fender Telecaster; Fender Stratocaster; Fender Precision Bass; Fender Bassman
- Spouses: Esther Klosky (m. 1934; died 1979); Phyllis Fender (m. 1980)

Clarence Leonidas Fender (August 10, 1909 – March 21, 1991) was an American inventor and founder of the Fender Musical Instruments Corporation.

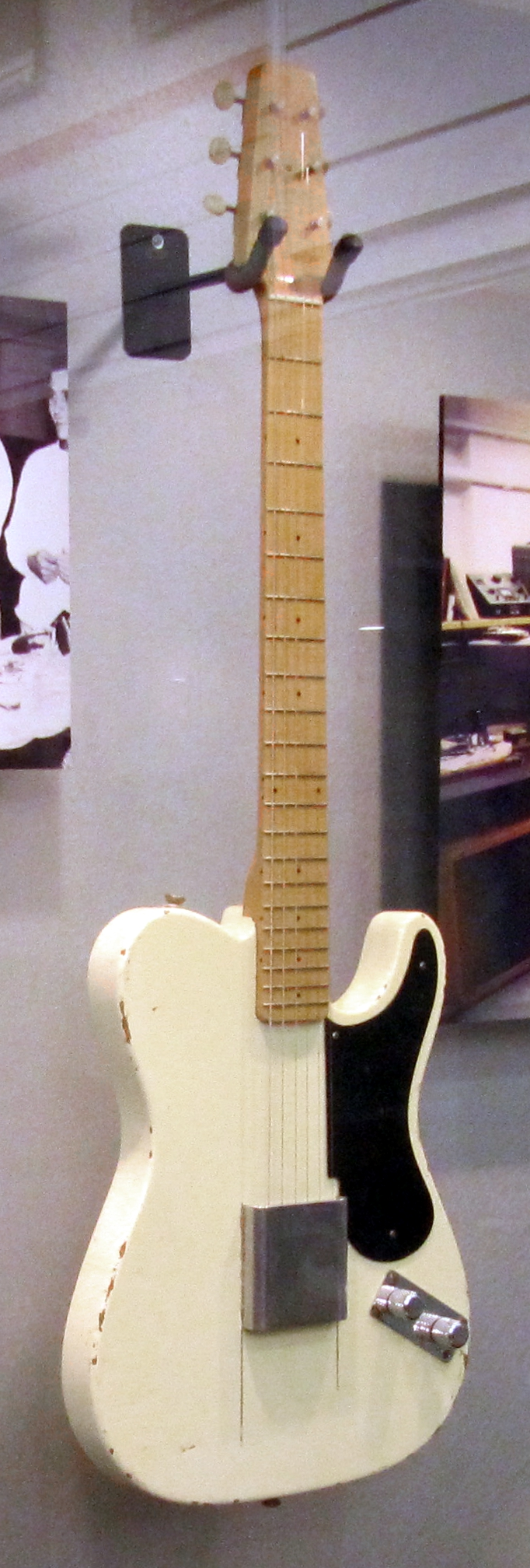
First prototype of the Fender Esquire (1949)

Fender designed the company's iconic early instruments: the Fender Telecaster, the first mass-produced solid-body electric guitar; the Fender Stratocaster, among the most iconic electric guitars; and the Fender Precision Bass, which set the standard for electric basses. He also designed the Fender Bassman amplifier, which became the archetype for later amplifiers (notably by Marshall and Mesa Boogie) that dominated rock and roll music.

Fender, who was not a guitarist himself, was inducted posthumously into the Rock and Roll Hall of Fame in 1992.

== Early life and education ==
Clarence Leonidas Fender was born on August 10, 1909, to Clarence Monte Fender and Harriet Elvira Wood, owners of a successful orange grove located between Anaheim and Fullerton, California. At the age of eight, Fender developed a tumor in his left eye, resulting in the eye being removed and being replaced with a glass eye, making him ineligible for the draft in World War II later in life.

As a youth, Fender played piano and saxophone before his interests shifted toward electronics. When he was 14, Fender visited his uncle's automotive-electric shop in Santa Maria, and was fascinated by a radio his uncle had built from spare parts. Soon thereafter, Fender began repairing radios in a small shop in his parents' home.

In 1928, Fender graduated from Fullerton Union High School, and entered Fullerton Junior College as an accounting major, though he continued to work with electronics. After college, Fender worked as an ice delivery man and later bookkeeper. Around this time, he was approached by a local bandleader asking him to build six public address systems for use in Hollywood dance halls.

== Career ==
=== Fender Radio Service ===
In 1938, with a borrowed $600 (equivalent to $13,723 in 2025), Fender and his wife Esther returned to Fullerton, and started his own radio repair shop, Fender Radio Service. Soon, musicians and band leaders began coming to him for public address systems, which he built, rented, and sold. They also visited his store for amplification for the amplified acoustic guitars that were beginning to show up on the southern California music scene—in big band and jazz music, and for the electric "Hawaiian" or "lap steel" guitars becoming popular in country music.

=== Early guitars ===
During World War II, Fender met Clayton Orr "Doc" Kauffman, an inventor and lap steel player who worked for Rickenbacker, which had been building and selling lap steel guitars for a decade. While with Rickenbacker, Kauffman had invented the "Vibrola" tailpiece, a precursor to the later vibrato tailpiece. Fender convinced him to go into business together, and they started the "K&F Manufacturing Corporation" to design and build amplified Hawaiian guitars and amplifiers. In 1944, Fender and Kauffman patented a lap steel guitar with an electric pickup already patented by Fender. In 1945, they began selling the guitar in a kit with an amplifier designed by K&F. In 1946, Doc pulled out of K&F and Fender revised the company and renamed it "Fender Manufacturing", and then later "Fender Electric Instrument Co." at the end of 1947 and he handed over the reins of his radio shop to Dale Hyatt.

Fender later recognized the potential for an electric guitar that was easy to hold, tune, and play, and would not feed back at dance hall volumes as the typical archtop would. In 1948, he finished the prototype of a thin solid-body electric; the first one-pickup model was released in 1950 as the Fender Esquire, while a two-pickup version, initially called the Broadcaster but renamed the Telecaster after a trademark issue, was released the year after. The Telecaster became one of the most popular electric guitars in history.

=== Stratocaster ===
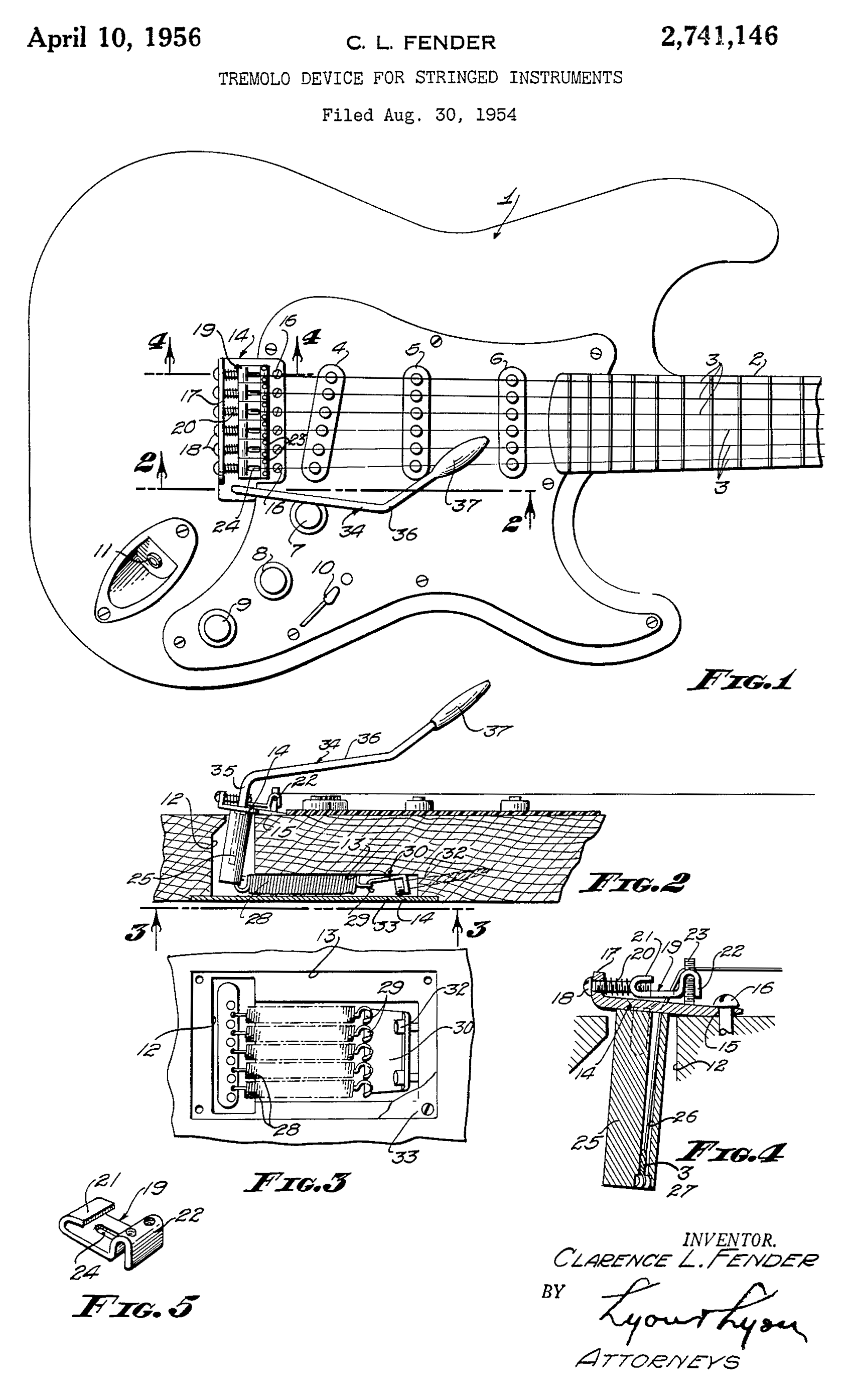
Patent for the Fender Stratocaster vibrato mechanism created in 1956

Instead of updating the Telecaster, Fender decided, based on customer feedback, to leave the Telecaster as it was and design a new, upscale solid-body guitar to sell alongside the basic Telecaster. Western swing guitarist Bill Carson was one of the chief critics of the Telecaster, stating that the new design should have individually adjustable bridge saddles, four or five pickups, a vibrato unit that could be used in either direction and return to proper tuning, and a contoured body for enhanced comfort over the slab-body Telecaster's harsh edges. Fender, assisted by draftsman Freddie Tavares, began designing the Stratocaster in late 1953. It included a rounder, less "club-like" neck (at least for the first year of issue) and a double cutaway for easier reach to the upper registers.

Another novelty to the Stratocaster design included the use of three pickups wired to offer three different voicings, two of which could be further tailored by the player by adjusting the two tone controls. The Stratocaster was the first electric guitar on the market to offer three pickups and a "tremolo" arm (which was actually used for vibrato, not tremolo), which became widely used by guitarists. The three pickups could be selected using the standard three-way switch to give the guitar different sounds and options by using the "neck", "middle" or "bridge" pickups. Though Fender preferred the sound of single pickups, guitarists discovered they could get the switch to stay between the detent positions and activate two pickups at once. The five-way switch was finally implemented as a factory option in late 1976, adding the detent combinations of neck+middle or bridge+middle musicians had used for years.

=== Electric basses ===
During this time, Fender also tackled the problems experienced by players of the acoustic double bass, who could no longer compete for volume with the other musicians. Double basses were also large, bulky, and difficult to transport.

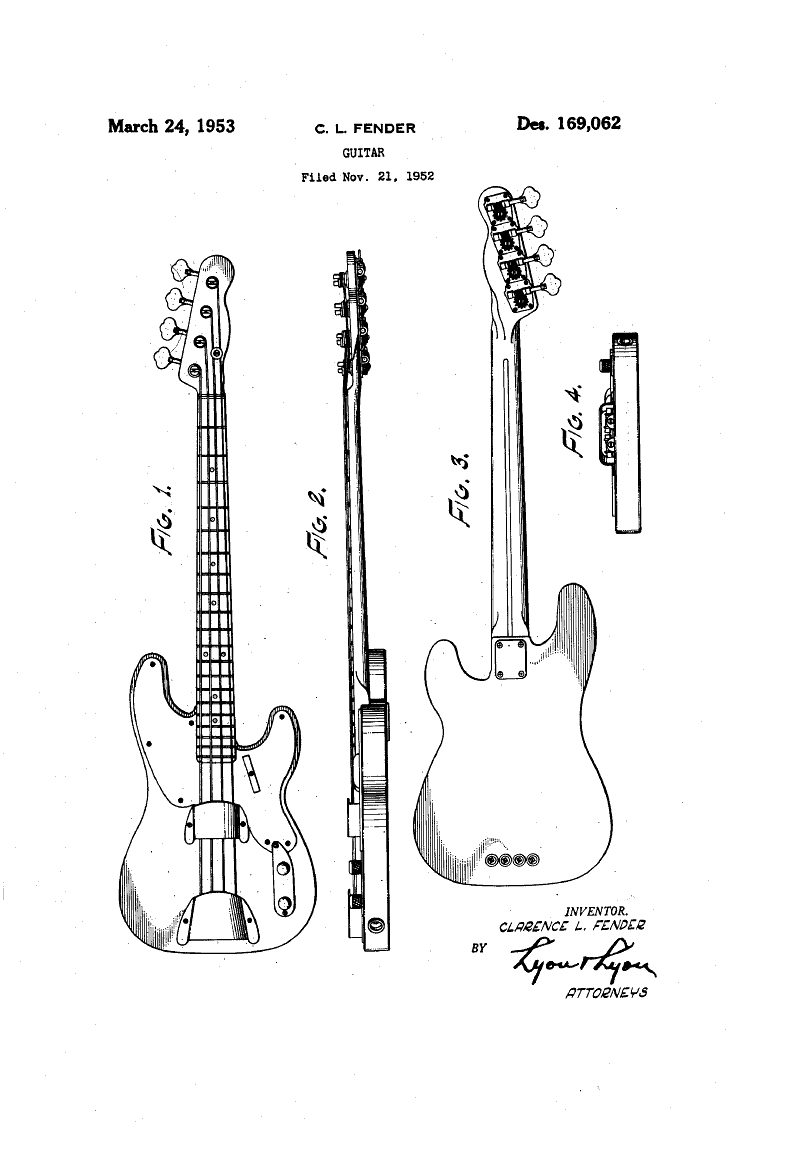
Patent sketch for the original Fender Precision Bass in 1951

With the Precision Bass (or "P-Bass"), released in 1951, Fender addressed both issues: the Telecaster-based Precision Bass was small and portable, and its solid-body construction and four-magnet, single coil pickup let it play at higher volumes without feedback. Along with the Precision Bass (so named because its fretted neck allowed bassists to play with "precision"), Fender introduced a bass amplifier, the Fender Bassman, a 25-watt amplifier with one 15-inch speaker (later updated to 45 watts and four 10-inch speakers).

1954 saw an update of the Precision Bass to coincide with the introduction of the Stratocaster. Incorporating some of the body contours of the Stratocaster, the update also included a two-section nickel-plated bridge and a white single-layer pickguard.

In June 1957, Fender announced a redesign of the Precision Bass. The remake included a larger headstock, a new pickguard design, a bridge with four steel saddles that could be individually adjusted and a new split single-coil pickup. This proved to be the final version of the instrument, which has changed little since then. In 1960, rosewood fingerboards, wider color selections and a three-ply pickguard became available for the P-Bass.

1960 saw the release of the Jazz Bass, a sleeker, updated bass with a slimmer neck, and offset waist body and two single coil pickups (as opposed to the Precision Bass and its split-humbucking pickup that had been introduced in 1957). Like its predecessor, the Jazz Bass (or simply "J-Bass") was an instant hit and has remained popular to this day, and early models are highly sought after by collectors.

=== 1970 and later: Music Man and G&L ===
In the 1950s, Fender contracted a streptococcal sinus infection that impaired his health to the point where he decided to wind up his business affairs, selling the Fender company to CBS in 1965. As part of this deal, Fender signed a non-compete clause and remained a consultant with Fender for a while. Shortly after selling the company, he changed doctors and was cured of his illness. In 1971, Forrest White and Tom Walker formed the Tri-Sonix company (often incorrectly referred to as "Tri-Sonic"), based in Santa Ana, California. Walker and White went to Fender to help finance their company and it evolved into "Music Man", a name Fender preferred over their name. After considerable financing, in 1975, Fender became its president.

The StingRay bass was an innovative early instrument. Though the body design borrowed heavily from the Precision Bass, the StingRay is largely considered the first production bass with active electronics. The StingRay's two-band active equalizer, high-output humbucking pickup, and high-gloss finished neck became a favorite of many influential bassists, including Louis Johnson, Bernard Edwards, John Deacon, Ben Orr, John Taylor, Tony Levin, Pino Palladino, Kim Deal, Tim Commerford, Gail Ann Dorsey and Flea. Later, a three-band active equalizer was introduced on the StingRay. Music Man was active in making amplifiers as well, but the HD-130 Reverb, designed to compete with the Twin Reverb, came at a time when the clean sounds of the Twin were going out of fashion.

In 1979, Fender and old friends George Fullerton and Dale Hyatt started a new company called G&L ("George & Leo") Musical Products. G&L guitar designs tended to lean heavily upon the looks of Fender's original guitars such as the Stratocaster and Telecaster, but incorporated innovations such as enhanced tremolo systems and electronics.

== Personal life and death ==
In 1934, Fender married Esther Klosky, and the couple remained together until Esther's death from cancer in 1979. Fender remarried in 1980; his second wife Phyllis became an Honorary Chairman of G&L.

Despite suffering several minor strokes, Fender continued to work. On March 21, 1991, he died of complications from Parkinson's disease. He was buried at Fairhaven Memorial Park in Santa Ana, California, next to his first wife Esther. Phyllis Fender died on July 22, 2020.

Fender's accomplishments for "contributions of outstanding technical significance to the recording field" were acknowledged with a Technical Grammy Award in 2009. Fender Avenue in Fullerton, California was named after him.
