= George William Fullerton =

Music instrument designer (1923–2009)

George Fullerton
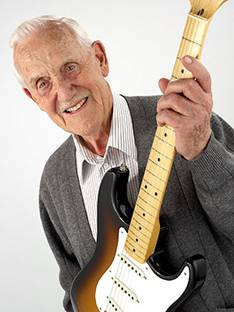
- George William Fullerton in 2007 shown here with the Fullerton 50th Anniversary Stratocaster guitar.
- Born: George William Fullerton; March 7, 1923; Hindsville, Arkansas, United States
- Died: July 4, 2009 (aged 86); Fullerton, California, United States

George William Fullerton (March 7, 1923 – July 4, 2009) was a longtime associate of Leo Fender and, along with Fender and Dale Hyatt, a co-founder of G&L Musical Instruments. He is credited with design contributions that led to the manufacture of the first mass-produced solid-body electric guitar.

== Biography ==
Born in Hindsville, Arkansas, George Fullerton moved to Southern California in 1940. He served in the United States Marine Corps and later worked part-time at Lockheed Aircraft as a machinist while attending night school to further his interest in electronics.

Leo Fender invited Fullerton to join his company and Fullerton became a full-time Fender employee on February 28, 1948. He is credited with design innovations that allowed Fender to produce its first solid body electric guitars, the Esquire and Broadcaster, which the company introduced in 1950. After leaving Fender in 1970, he continued to work with Leo Fender at the CLF Research company, and later co-founded G&L Musical Instruments along with Fender and longtime Fender salesman Dale Hyatt. Fullerton returned to Fender as a consultant in the company's custom shop in 2007. In November 2007, the company unveiled the limited edition George Fullerton 50th anniversary 1957 Stratocaster guitar and Pro Junior amplifier.

Fullerton was inducted into the Fender Hall of Fame in 2010.

== See also ==
- G&L Musical Instruments
