= List of Stratocaster players =

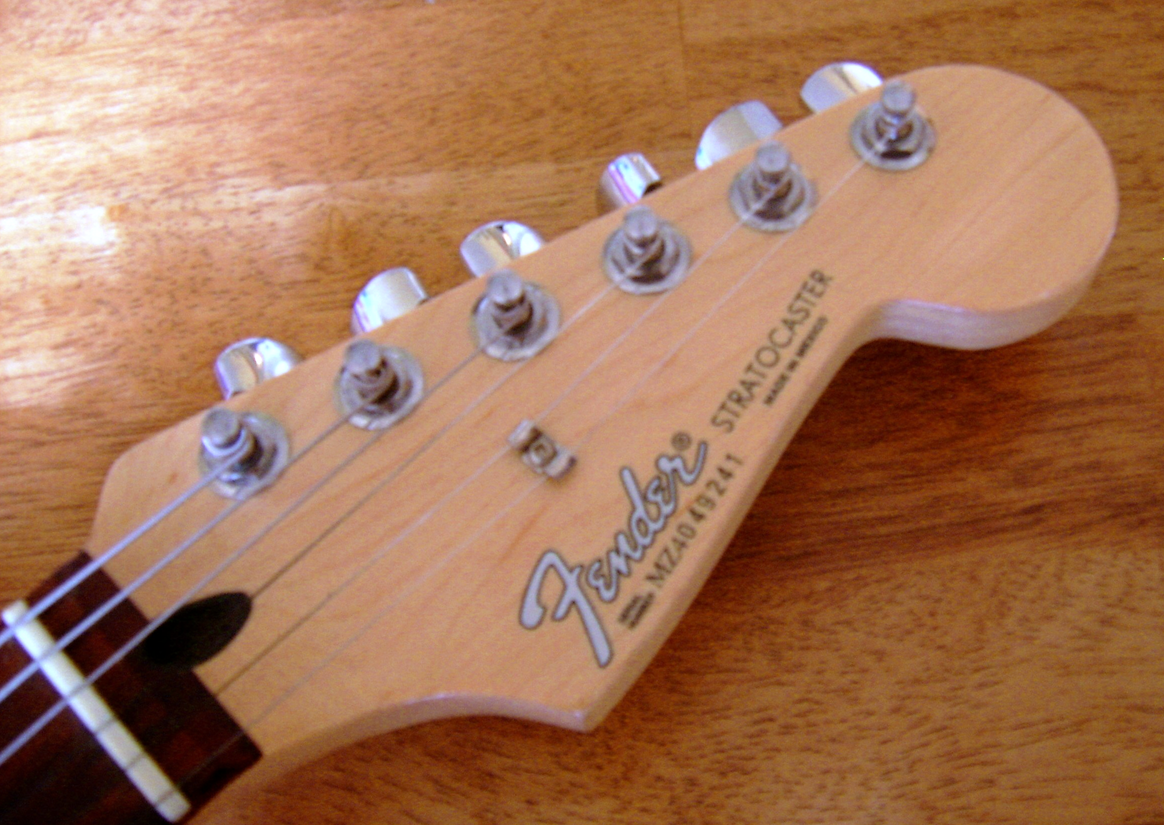
Stratocaster Headstock

This is a list of musicians who have made notable use of the Fender Stratocaster in live performances or studio recordings. The Fender Stratocaster was designed by Leo Fender and Freddie Tavares with involvement from musicians Rex Gallion and Bill Carson in the early 1950s, and since its commercial introduction in 1954 has become widely used among popular artists in rock, blues, and other genres. The Squier Stratocaster is produced by Fender as a more affordable alternative to the Fender-branded version.

Due to the immense popularity of this model, musicians are listed here only if their use of this instrument was especially significant — that is, they are players who:

- have long careers and a history of Stratocaster use,
- have a particular guitar that was unique or of historical importance, and
- have contributed significantly to the popularization of the instrument through their use of it.

== A–E ==
- Billie Joe Armstrong (born 1972), lead singer and guitarist of Green Day, uses a heavily stickered Fernandes Stratocaster copy nicknamed "Blue". Armstrong modified this guitar with a Bill Lawrence humbucking pickup on the bridge position. After sustaining damage from mud during their performance in Woodstock '94, the bridge pickup was replaced with a Seymour Duncan JB. Blue was used on the recording of every Green Day album until Warning, and during live performances of Green Day's early work, such as their songs from Dookie. Armstrong also used a Fender Stratocaster from the Fender Custom Shop while recording Nimrod.
- Randy Bachman (born 1943), a founding member of both The Guess Who and Bachman–Turner Overdrive (BTO) who recently fronted the project "Randy Bachman's Jazz Thing." After a visit to a chiropractor, Bachman was persuaded to switch from a Gibson Les Paul to a lighter Stratocaster. He modified the pickups on his first Strat, putting a Gibson pickup at the neck and a Telecaster pickup at the bridge, while leaving the Stratocaster pickup in the middle. Randy favored Stratocasters and custom Strat-style guitars throughout his years with BTO. Though his bands are mostly known for their simplistic rock-radio anthems, Bachman's soloing often revealed complex melodies and jazz-inflected phrasing. Among his Stratocasters used are a '63 standard and a '71 four-bolt hardtail. He has listed guitar influences as varied as Lenny Breau, Leslie West, Wes Montgomery and Hank Marvin.
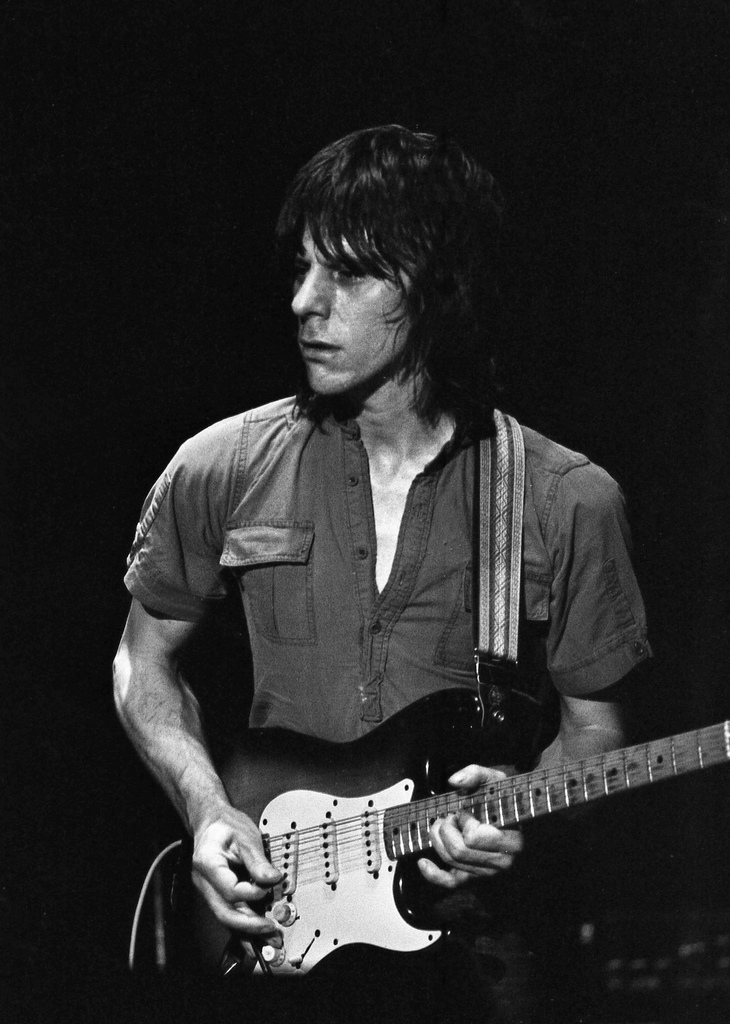
- Jeff Beck in Amsterdam, 1979.
  Jeff Beck (1944–2023) - a Grammy award-winning rock guitarist, Beck was known for playing for various bands such as the Yardbirds and his own group The Jeff Beck Group. Beck primarily played a Stratocaster and also has a signature Strat. He was noted for his innovative use of the Stratocaster's vibrato system. Up to 1975 Beck had been, primarily, a Les Paul player. In an interview with Jas Obrecht about switching to the Stratocaster, Beck stated, "With a Les Paul you just wind up sounding like someone else. With the Strat I finally sound like me."
- Adrian Belew (born 1949), is an American guitarist, singer, songwriter, multi-instrumentalist and record producer. He is perhaps best known for his work as a member of the progressive rock group King Crimson. He has also worked extensively as a session and touring musician, most famously with Talking Heads, David Bowie, Frank Zappa, and Nine Inch Nails. During much of his career, Belew made extensive use of a weathered-looking Stratocaster, later memorialized in song as "The Battered Strat." This guitar was relic'ed by Seymour Duncan.
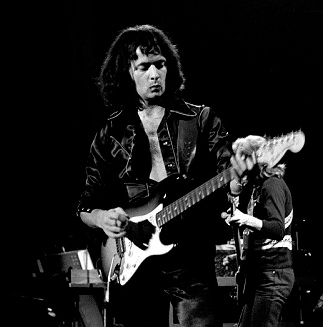
- Ritchie Blackmore in 1977.
  Ritchie Blackmore (born 1945), a founding member of both Deep Purple and Rainbow, and currently a member of the band Blackmore's Night. After starting his career using various Höfner and Gibson guitars, Blackmore switched to a Stratocaster in the late 1960s after seeing Jimi Hendrix perform with one. Blackmore's Stratocasters are modified; the middle pickup is lowered and not used (sometimes disconnected completely) and his Stratocaster fingerboards are all scalloped from the 10th fret up. Through the early/mid 1970s Blackmore was notorious for onstage abuse of his guitars, sometimes destroying them completely. By the late 1970s the guitarist had found a Stratocaster model he was content with and it remained his main stage and studio guitar up until it had to be refretted.
- Tommy Bolin (1951–1976), a versatile guitarist who is noted for his influence in genres ranging from acoustic blues to hard rock and jazz fusion. He was the lead guitarist for Zephyr, James Gang and Deep Purple. He also had a brief but notable solo career, and collaborated with artists like Billy Cobham, Alphonse Mouzon and Moxy. Bolin played by ear and was known for his improvisational skill. His primary guitar was a stock 1963 sunburst Stratocaster.
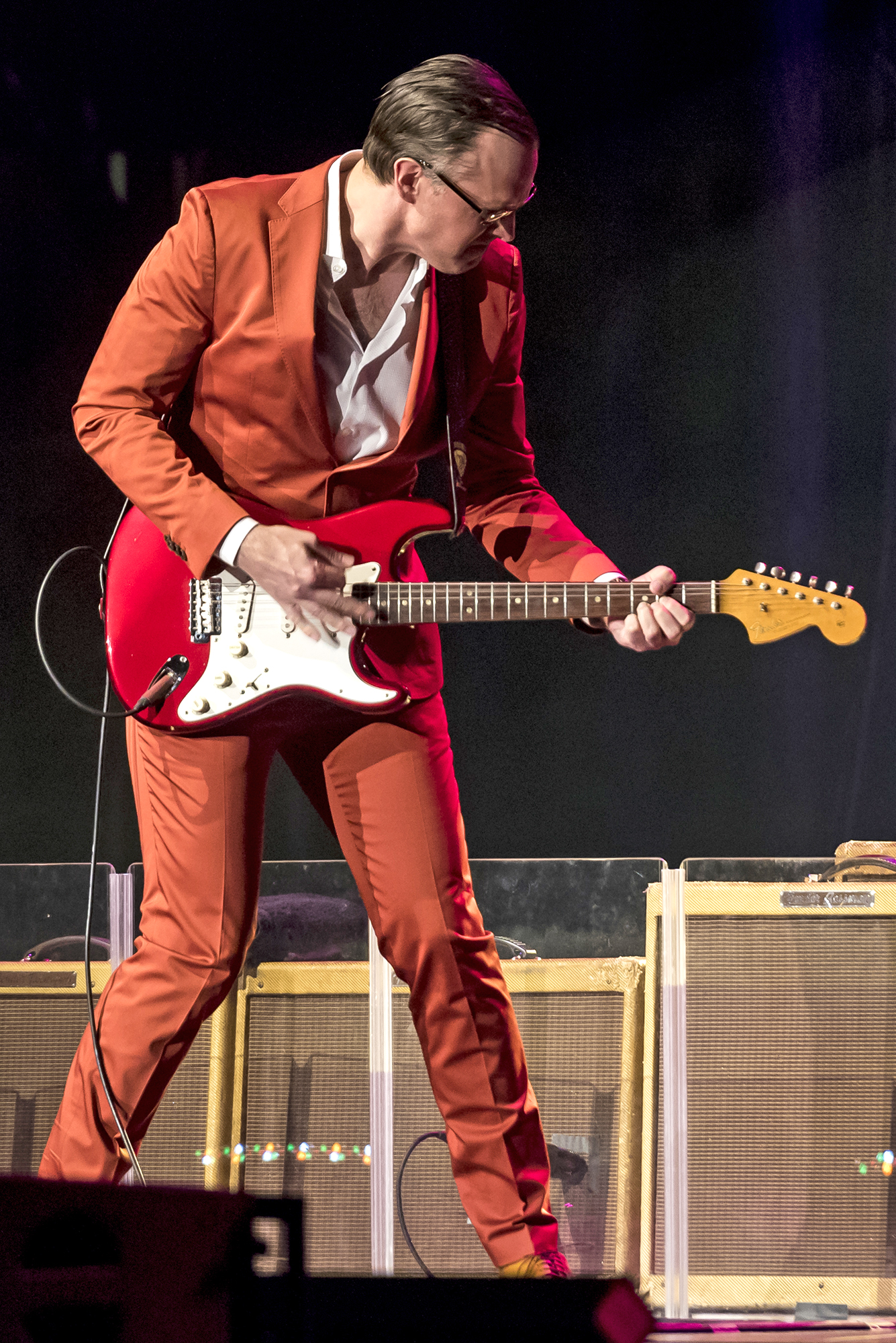
  Joe Bonamassa in 2016.
- Joe Bonamassa (born 1977), a blues rock guitarist, has used Stratocasters throughout his career. When he was 12 years old, Bonamassa played a crimson 1972 Fender Stratocaster. Bonamassa is known for his extensive collection of vintage amplifiers and guitars. In 2018, Bonamassa said that he has more than 1000 guitars, a large fraction of which are Fender Stratocasters.
- Bill Carson (1926–2007), a country and western guitarist credited by Fender as "the man for whom the Stratocaster was designed."
- Eric Clapton (born 1945), an English rock guitarist, originally played Gibson guitars early in his career. While he was still a member of Cream, Clapton bought his first Stratocaster, Brownie, in 1967, which was later used on songs like "Layla". Blackie, a composite of three different guitars, went into service in 1974 and was regularly played until its retirement in 1985. It was sold at charity auction for $959,500 in 2004. In 1988, Fender introduced the Eric Clapton Stratocaster, the first model in their Signature series. Clapton has been a long-standing client of the Fender Custom Shop.
- Kurt Cobain (1967–1994), lead singer and guitarist of grunge band Nirvana, used Fender Stratocasters throughout his career, using the guitar in the music video for "Lithium" and in the band's famous performance at the 1992 Reading Festival. Cobain's most well-known Stratocaster has a sticker on the body with the text "VANDALISM: BEAUTIFUL AS A ROCK IN A COP'S FACE."
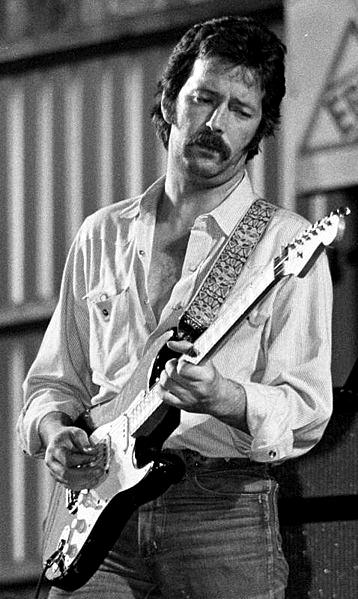
- Eric Clapton in a Switzerland concert on June 19, 1977.
  Ry Cooder (born 1947), a guitarist, singer and composer who is well known for his interest in American folk music, his collaborations with other notable musicians, and his work on many film soundtracks. Cooder's bottleneck slide guitar playing, heard on such works as the soundtrack to the 1984 film Paris, Texas, influenced other guitarists such as Bonnie Raitt and Chris Rea and contributed to the popularity of the Stratocaster as a slide guitar. He uses a '60s Stratocaster for such playing.
- Billy Corgan (born 1967) has played a range of Stratocasters from the start of his career with The Smashing Pumpkins. In the early years of the band this was a '74 yellow Strat that was stolen (and later returned in the mid-2010s). His famous "Bat Strat" was a 1990s reissue '57 Strat—this guitar is still used by Corgan. He also has played a blue '74 Strat since the Mellon Collie and the Infinite Sadness era, and in 2009 Fender issued a custom shop Billy Corgan signature Stratocaster, which was designed to encourage individualistic playing and fit the needs of "high-gain rock". It features a heavy body weight and DiMarzio pickups.
- Robert Cray (born 1953), a long-time blues guitarist and singer, Cray plays a '64 Strat and had his own Signature model made in 1990. The signature model, manufactured by the Fender Custom Shop, combines aspects of Cray's '59 Strat and the '64, omits the standard Stratocaster whammy bar, and includes custom pickups.
- Dick Dale (1937–2019), considered a pioneer of surf rock, was one of the first owners of a Stratocaster; his was given to him personally by Leo Fender in 1955. He has been revolutionary in experimenting with the sound of the guitar by using heavy reverb and a unique fast-picking style as heard on "Misirlou".
- Tom DeLonge (born 1975), guitarist and co-lead vocalist of Blink-182, used several Stratocasters in the first half of his career. From the founding of Blink-182 until the recording of their debut album Cheshire Cat (1995), he used a fiesta red Squier Stratocaster. Shortly before the album's release, DeLonge switched to a white 40th Anniversary Edition Stratocaster, which was heavily modified with stickers as well as Seymour Duncan Hot Rails and JB Jr. pickups (neck and middle positions respectively) and a Dimarzio X2N (bridge position). He used this guitar until 1998. In 1999, he teamed up with Fender to release a signature Stratocaster with a single Seymour Duncan Invader in the bridge position, which was initially sold until 2004 and later reissued in 2023.
- The Edge (born 1961), lead guitarist of U2, known for his percussive, melodic playing and use of delay, has used the Stratocaster as one of his main guitars throughout his career.

== F–J ==
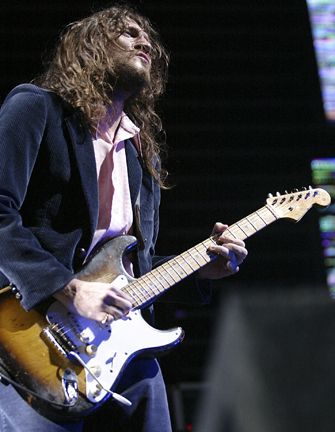
- John Frusciante in 2006
  John Frusciante (born 1970), the current guitarist of Red Hot Chili Peppers, Frusciante used many pre-70s Strats, with the most notable being his worn 1962 Stratocaster. Frusciante used Stratocasters in every Red Hot Chili Peppers album he was involved with, including Mother's Milk, Blood Sugar Sex Magik, and Californication.

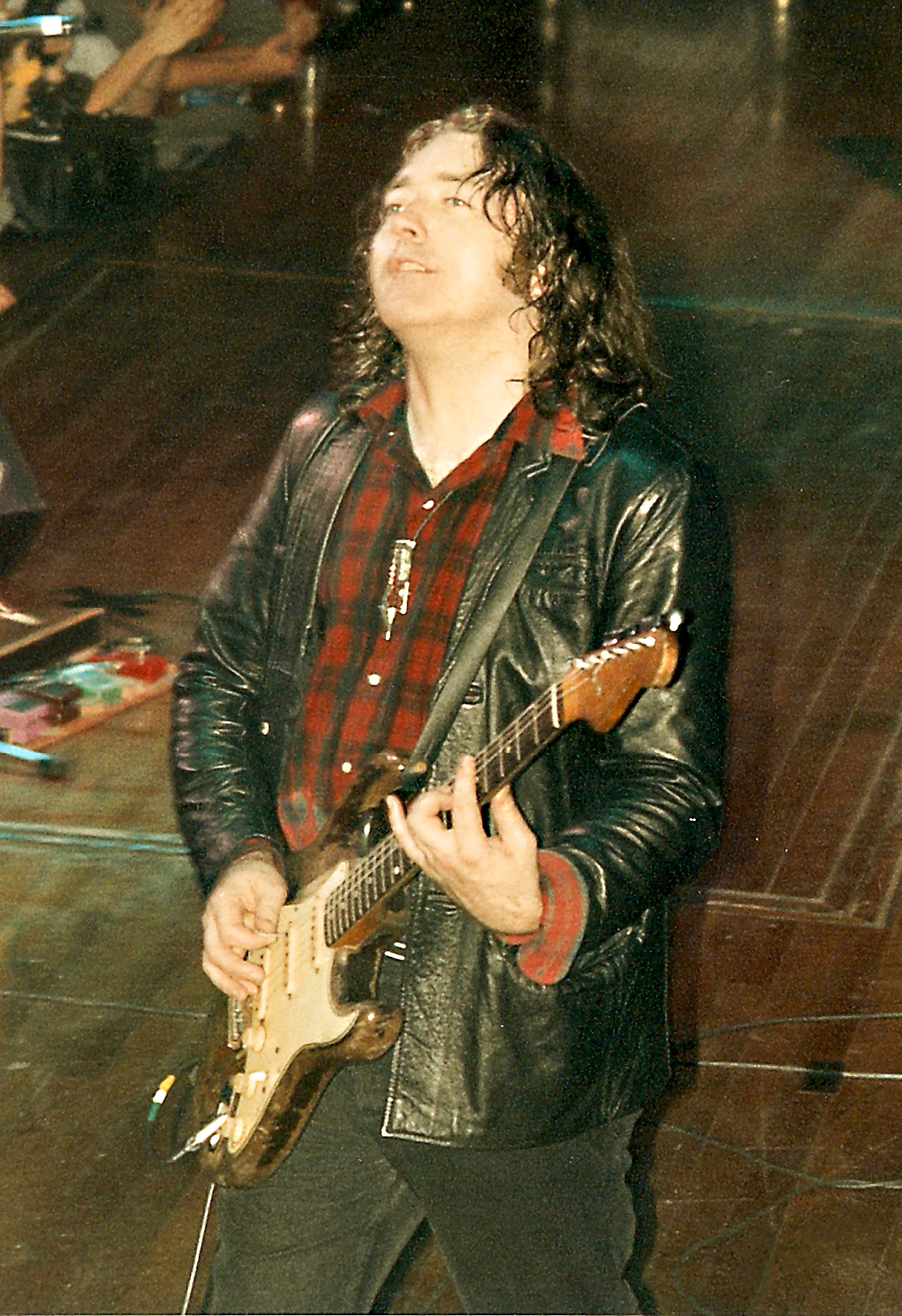
Rory Gallagher in 1987

- Rory Gallagher (1948–1995), an Irish blues rock guitarist, often credited as one of the most influential rock and blues guitarists of all time. Gallagher is well known for his worn 1961 sunburst Stratocaster. He described his battered Stratocaster as "a part of my psychic makeup". When asked about its importance, Gallagher said, "B.B. King has owned over 100 Lucilles, but I only own one Strat, and it hasn't got a name." Gallagher's Stratocaster has also been reproduced by the Fender Custom shop, to the exact specs of the original one.
- Lowell George (1945–1979), primary guitarist and singer of Little Feat. Lowell was proficient on slide guitar employing his trademark tone which he achieved through use of compression and open tunings helping to define his soulful sound as well as giving him the means to play his extended melodic lines. Additionally, he used to swap the bridge pickups of his Stratocasters for Telecaster bridge pickups.
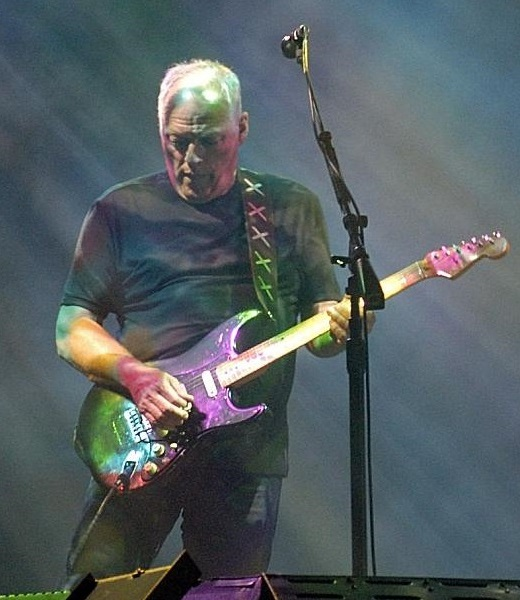
  David Gilmour in 2006
- David Gilmour (born 1946), as a solo artist and guitar player for Pink Floyd, Gilmour is credited for his unique, blues-based compositional approach and expressive soloing. Author Tony Bacon stated "his solo on 'Comfortably Numb' remains for many a definitive Strat moment." Gilmour's guitar of choice is a custom modified Fender Stratocaster. He is the owner of Strat #0001, which was manufactured in 1954 but was not the first Stratocaster made since Fender does not use sequential serial numbers. Gilmour is considered to be one of the more influential Stratocaster players since the instrument's invention. David's signature black Stratocaster, used frequently in 1970s concerts and on the blockbuster albums The Dark Side of the Moon, Wish You Were Here, Animals and The Wall, is featured in a recent book by his long-time guitar tech Phil Taylor, titled Pink Floyd, The Black Strat—A History of David Gilmour's Black Stratocaster. The "Black Strat" was retired in the 1980s in favour of a Candy Apple Red American Vintage Stratocaster fitted with EMG noiseless single-coil pickups as seen on the Delicate Sound of Thunder and Pulse tours. The Black Strat was briefly used on the documentary Classic Albums: Dark Side of the Moon before being put on display at the Hard Rock Cafe in Miami, Florida. It was finally brought out of retirement by David in 2005 and fitted with a '83 Fender Stratocaster neck for the Pink Floyd reunion at the Live 8 concert. David subsequently used it again for his "On An Island" album and tour in 2006 and when he played "Comfortably Numb" with Roger Waters on his tour of "The Wall" on May 12, 2011, in London and also played most of the leads on the final Pink Floyd album The Endless River and his 2015 solo album Rattle That Lock and its tour.
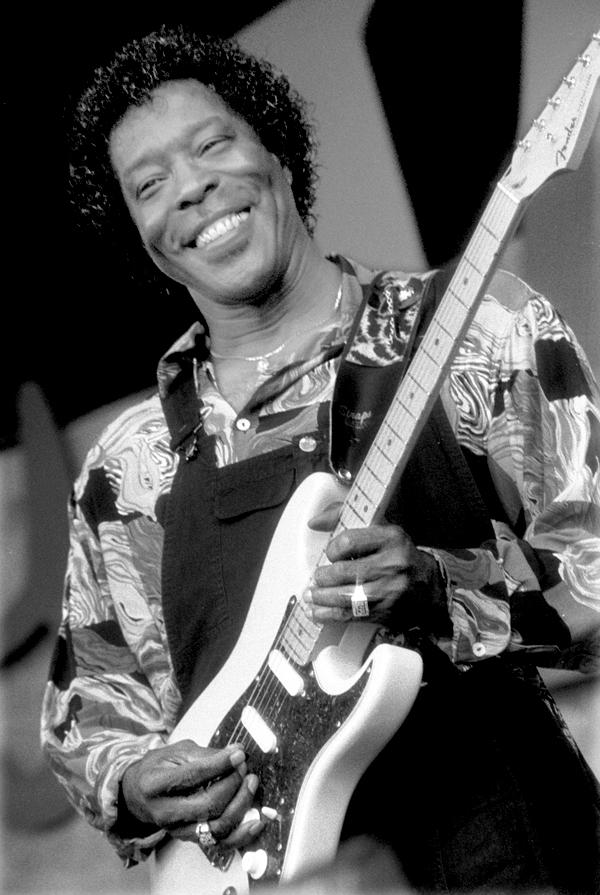
  Buddy Guy in 1992
- Buddy Guy (born 1936), an American blues guitarist and singer, Guy is well known for playing the Stratocaster throughout his long career. He is also known for his wild showmanship; Jimi Hendrix and Stevie Ray Vaughan both pointed to Guy as an influence on both their playing and their stage shows. Fender has issued several different variations of a Buddy Guy Signature Stratocaster since the early 1990s; the guitars generally have gold Lace Sensor pickups and modified circuitry.
- Albert Hammond Jr. (born 1980), guitarist for The Strokes, uses a white Fender Stratocaster as his main guitar for recording and live use. Hammond bought the guitar in 1999 for $400, and used it to record albums such as Is This It and Room on Fire. In 2018, Fender released a signature model of Hammond's guitar, featuring a larger headstock and a modified pickup wiring scheme.
- George Harrison (1943–2001), lead guitarist for the Beatles. Harrison and John Lennon obtained matching Sonic Blue Stratocasters in 1965. Harrison (and Lennon) employed the Stratocaster alongside a Gibson SG and an Epiphone during the recording sessions for Rubber Soul, Revolver and Sgt. Pepper's Lonely Hearts Club Band. In 1967, Harrison hand-painted his Stratocaster with a psychedelic paint job, using Day-Glo paint on the body and his wife Pattie Boyd's nail polish on the headstock. The guitar's nickname, "Rocky", is painted on the headstock. Harrison can be seen playing Rocky in the Magical Mystery Tour film as well as The Concert for Bangla Desh.
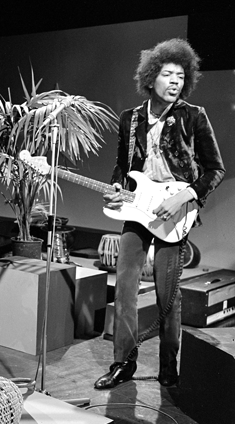
  Jimi Hendrix in 1967
- Jimi Hendrix (1942–1970), known for developing blues in a modern context, Hendrix's main stage guitar through most of his short career was a Fender Stratocaster. Although Hendrix played left-handed, he played a conventional right-handed Stratocaster flipped upside down, because he preferred to have the control knobs in the top position. Hendrix was responsible for a large increase in the Stratocaster's popularity during his career. In reference to his famed on-stage Stratocaster burning on the Monterey Pop Festival, Hendrix is quoted as saying, "The time I burned my guitar it was like a sacrifice. You sacrifice the things you love. I love my guitar." In 1990, the white Stratocaster used by Hendrix at the 1969 Woodstock Festival sold in a Sotheby's auction for $270,000, a record price at the time. In 1997 Fender produced a limited edition Hendrix tribute model Stratocaster.
- Buddy Holly (1936–1959), identified as "the first Strat hero." A statue of Holly in his home town of Lubbock, Texas, portrays him playing his Stratocaster, and the guitar is also engraved on his tombstone. Although the initial release of the Stratocaster came in 1954, the guitar did not begin to achieve popularity until Holly appeared on The Ed Sullivan Show in 1957 playing a maple-neck Strat. Holly was also pictured on the cover of The Crickets' 1957 album The "Chirping" Crickets with a sunburst Stratocaster, inspiring The Shadows' Hank Marvin to adopt the guitar.
- Ernie Isley (born 1952), member of the American musical ensemble The Isley Brothers has developed three custom Zeal Stratocasters from Fender Custom Shop, using his personal design.
- Eric Johnson (born 1954), a Grammy Award-winning guitarist from Austin, Texas, Johnson has played Stratocasters regularly during his career and has played many different types of music. He has participated in developing Eric Johnson signature Stratocaster models with Fender, which can be bought with both maple and rosewood necks.

== K–P ==
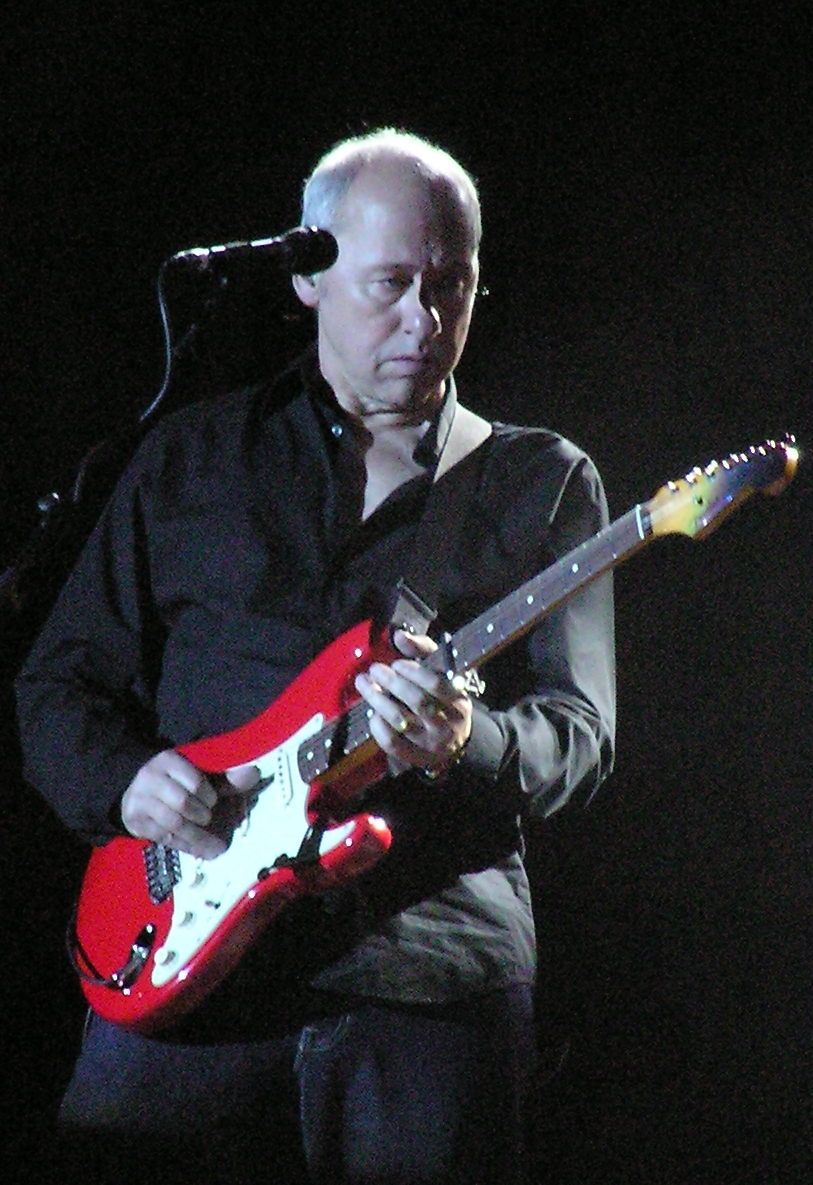
Mark Knopfler in a Hamburg concert on May 28, 2006

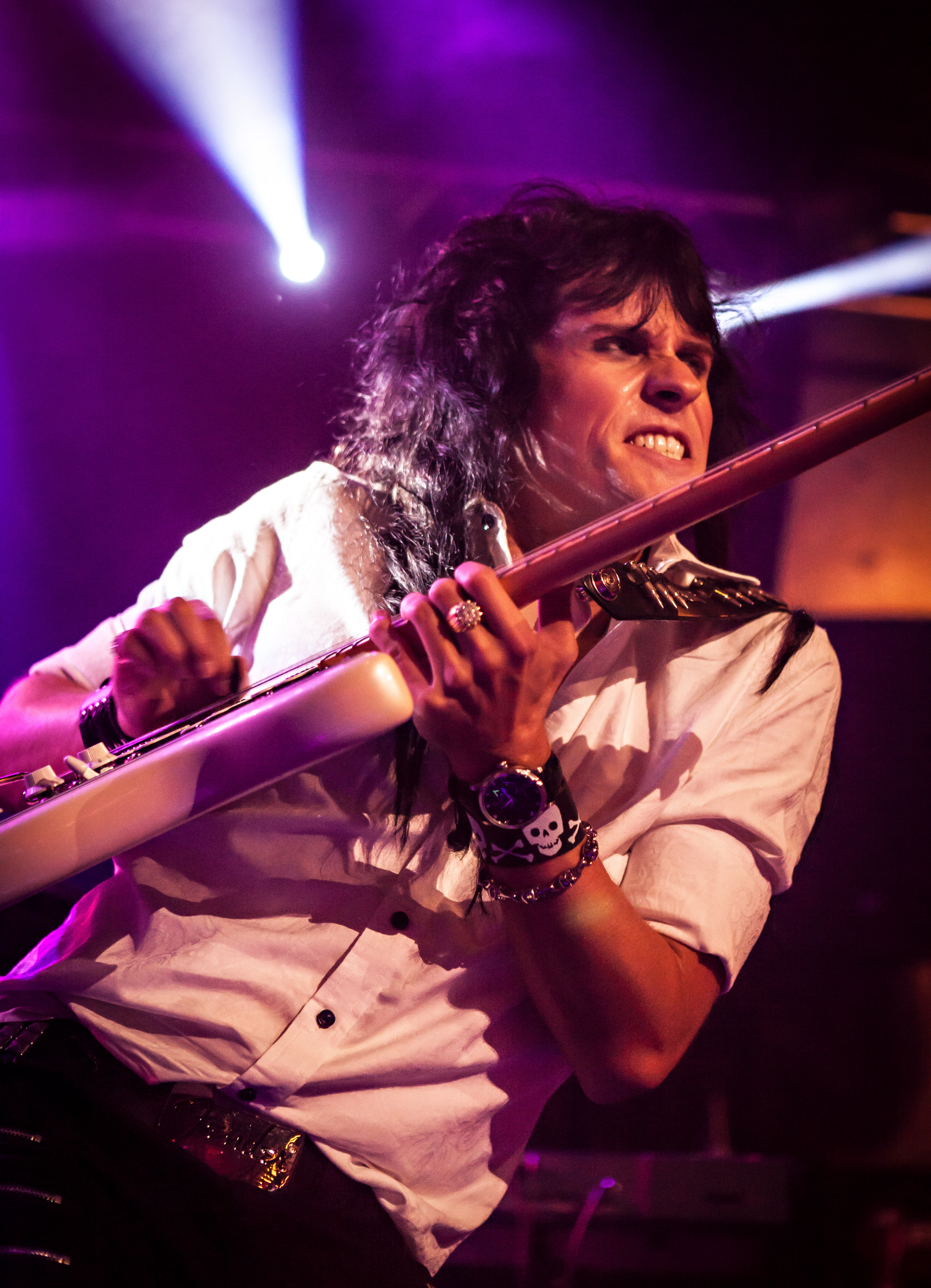
Rocky Kramer performing live in 2018

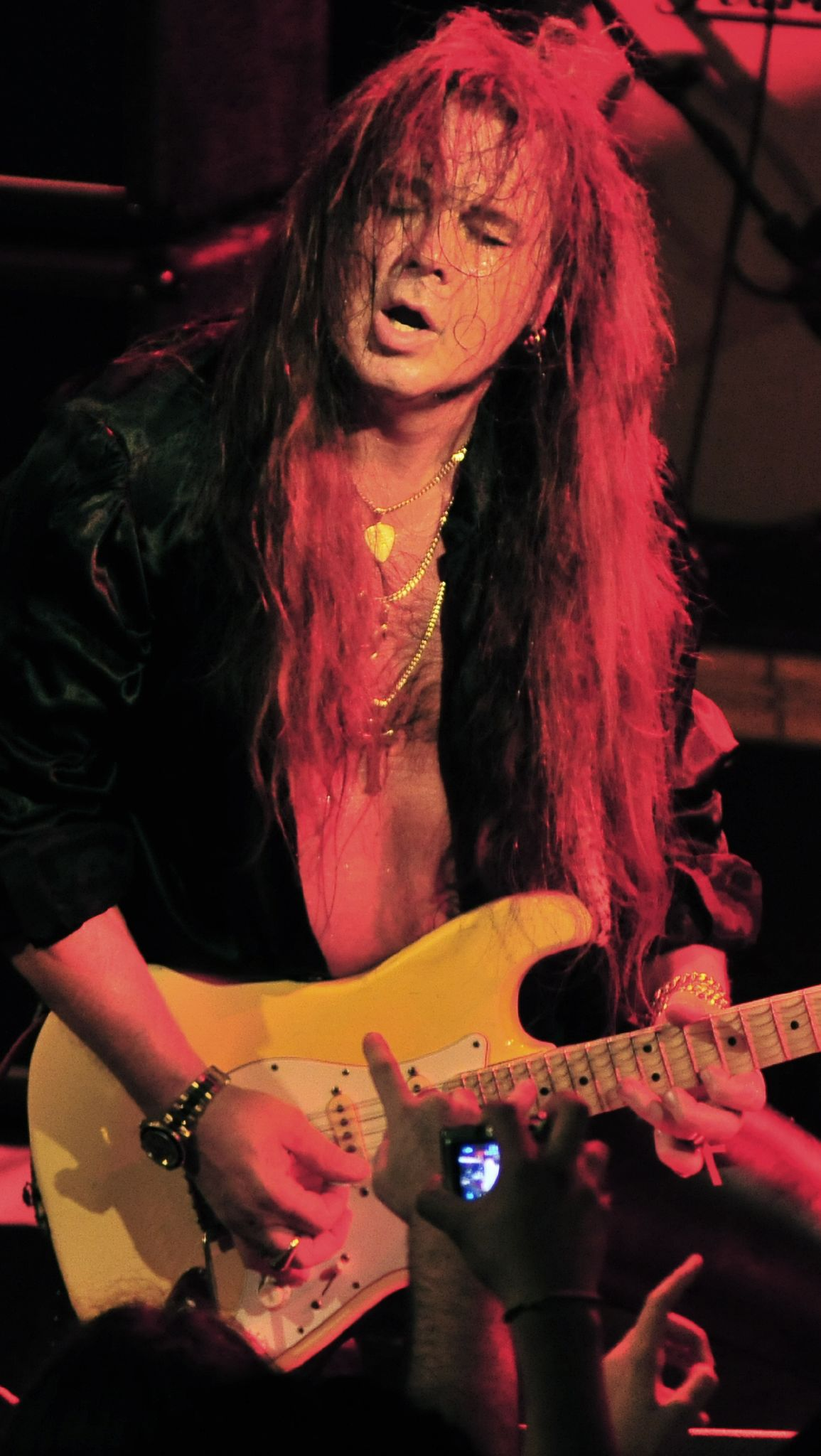
Yngwie Malmsteen in Barcelona in 2008 concert

- Ed King (1949–2018) is known for his work with the southern rock band Lynyrd Skynyrd from 1972 to 1975. He used a 1959 model with a black refinish and tortoise pickguard for most recordings and live performances at that time, and also a 1973 model which he used when writing the hit "Sweet Home Alabama".
- Mark Knopfler (born 1949), known for his work with British rock band Dire Straits. Knopfler is known for his very particular and unique fingerstyle playing. The song "Sultans of Swing", from Dire Straits' debut album in 1978, was a huge hit that showed the characteristic tone and technique displayed on Knopfler's red Stratocaster. He used the Fender Stratocaster throughout his entire career, as a member of Dire Straits and his solo career. Fender now produces his Signature Stratocaster.
- Greg Koch (born 1966), known for his incendiary guitar work. Koch was a Fender clinician and ambassador. He played the Stratocaster for many years and even recorded an album called Strat's Got Your Tongue. He is known for his love of Fender guitars.
- Bruce Kulick (born 1953), long-time member and lead guitarist of Kiss and Grand Funk Railroad. Kulick stated on his personal website that he used a Fender Power Stratocaster, a model with a humbucking pickup in place of the single-coil bridge pickup, to add a harmony solo line to his song, "What Love's All About." Kulick used a 1989 yellow Fender Strat Plus, during the recording of the 1992 Kiss Revenge album, including for the hit single, "God Gave Rock 'n Roll to You II." Revenge reached the Top 20 in several countries.
- Michael Landau (born 1958), friend of Steve Lukather and prolific session guitarist of the 1980s, has used many Stratocasters in his career and is working with Fender as of 2016 to create a Michael Landau Signature Stratocaster.
- John Lennon (1940–1980), the Beatles' rhythm guitarist, acquired matching Stratocasters with bandmate George Harrison during the 1965 sessions for Help!. However, Lennon rarely used his Stratocaster, which was notably played on "Nowhere Man" and during the Sgt. Pepper sessions. A different Strat was used on the Imagine album. John Lennon acquired a candy apple red "Strat" with 22 carat gold electroplated brass hardware around 1980. A photo of him playing this guitar in bed one morning in late 1980, shortly before his death, was used an inner sleeve of the album The John Lennon Collection.
- Alex Lifeson (born 1953), the guitarist for Rush since 1968, first recorded with a black Stratocaster on the Rush 1977 album A Farewell to Kings. In 1979, he modified the '77 Strat with a '57 classic humbucker, a Floyd Rose tremolo unit (first ever made), a Gibson toggle switch on the lower bout, and rewired with master volume/tone. He used that same guitar for the leads and direct recording for 1979's "Permanent Waves." In late 1980, Alex Lifeson acquired two more Strats in red and white, modifying them exactly the same as the former.
- Yngwie Malmsteen (born 1963), known for his work in the neo-classical metal genre. Influenced by an array of musicians, Malmsteen is regarded as highly influential for his use of heavy classical-style chord progressions, interesting phrases and arpeggio sweeps. He is known for playing Stratocasters with scalloped fretboards.
- Hank Marvin (born 1941), the lead guitarist of The Shadows, Marvin is reputed to be the owner of the first Fender Stratocaster in the UK (given to him by Cliff Richard). The guitar was finished in a shade of Fiesta Red, sometimes referred to as 'Salmon Pink'. This guitar, with its tremolo arm, contributed to the Shadows' distinctive sound. Guitarists such as David Gilmour and Mark Knopfler credit Marvin and The Shadows, who had "the first Strat that came to England", with influencing their own decisions to buy Stratocasters.
- John Mayer (born 1977), a Grammy Award-winning singer/songwriter, has played Stratocasters throughout his career and has had a Fender Artist Series Stratocaster made in both standard and limited edition form. Mayer's use of the Stratocaster in a wide range of musical genres is noted as a testament to the guitar's versatility. After tensions with Fender, he partnered with PRS Guitars to develop the PRS Silver Sky, a guitar heavily based on the Fender Stratocaster.
- Dave Murray has used a Stratocaster for much of his career as lead guitarist for Iron Maiden, with Fender creating signature models of his HSH-equipped black 1957 Strat, as well as a California series model based on his longtime stage guitar.
- Mike Oldfield (born 1953), a British guitarist who plays a wide range of guitars and instruments. His "Salmon-pink" strat, bought at the time of his hit Moonlight Shadow, is his favorite guitar.
- Brad Paisley (born 1972), a Grammy Award-winning country music artist, has sometimes played Fender Stratocasters both in the studio and live concerts despite using Fender Telecasters throughout his career. He debuted the usage of a Fender Stratocaster on "She's Everything" which was from his fourth studio album titled Time Well Wasted released in 2005. Since then, he has used Fender Stratocasters sometimes on stage and in the studio.

== Q–Z ==
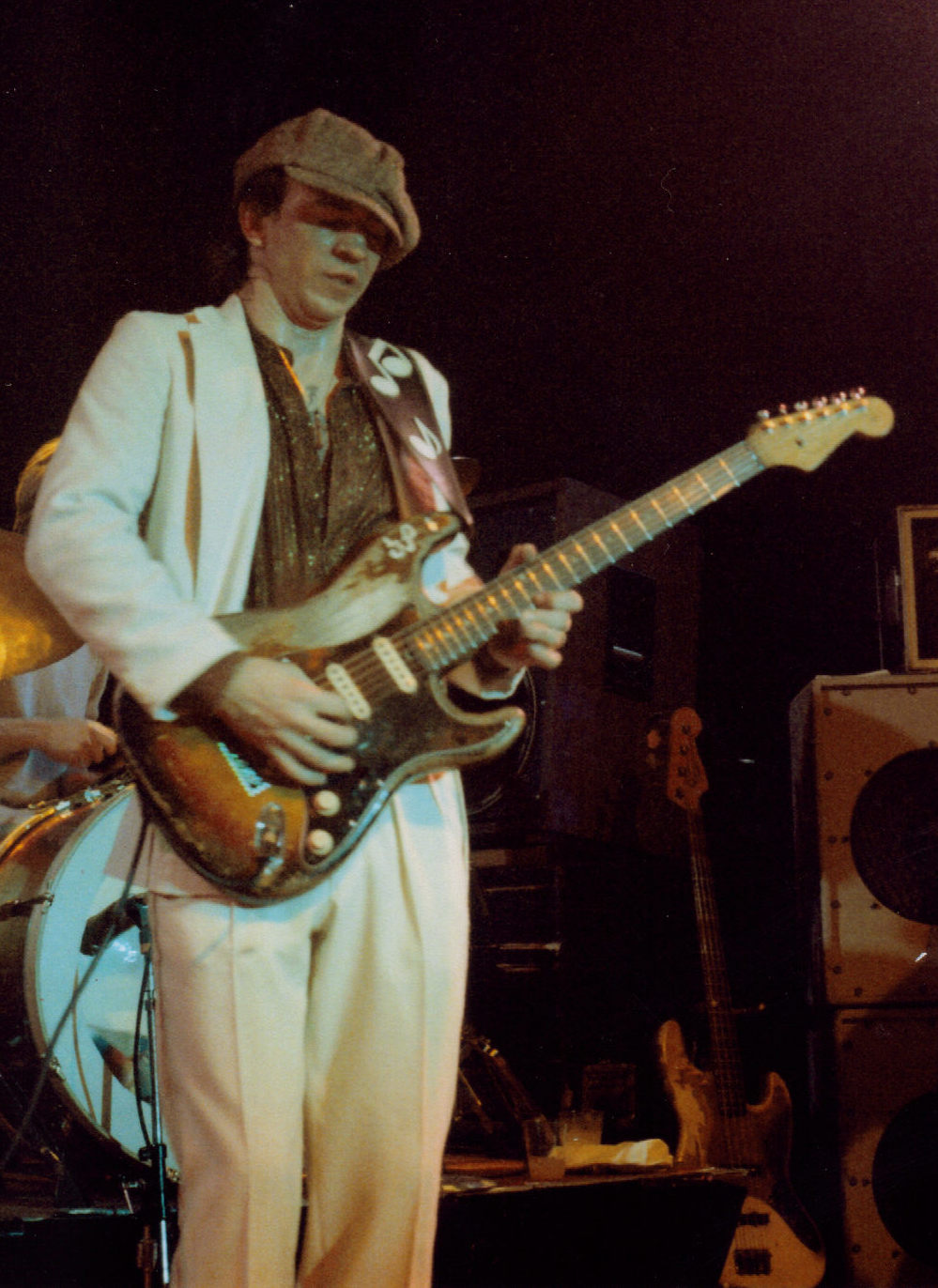
Stevie Ray Vaughan performing in 1983

- Trevor Rabin (born 1954), a South African (now has American citizenship) rock guitarist and film score composer. Best known for his time with Yes from 1982 to 1995, Rabin owns and plays several Stratocasters, and considers it his go-to instrument.
- Bonnie Raitt (born 1949), an American blues/R&B guitarist, singer, and songwriter, plays a 1965 Stratocaster nicknamed brownie, a 1963 sunburst Strat that used to be owned by Robin Trower as well as her signature Strat.
- Robbie Robertson (1943–2023), guitarist and principal songwriter for The Band. Robertson's main guitar choice was a Stratocaster, despite using a Telecaster early in his career. For The Last Waltz Robertson had a Stratocaster bronzed especially for his use in the film. More recently Robertson made a very rare live appearance at Eric Clapton's 2007 Crossroads Guitar Festival using a Stratocaster.
- Nile Rodgers (born 1952), an American musician known for his contributions with Chic and unique playing style that makes extensive use of the chop chord, has a 1960 Stratocaster affectionately dubbed as "The Hitmaker" for its presence on many hit singles.
- Richie Sambora (born 1959), lead guitarist, songwriter and a backup vocalist for Bon Jovi, began using Fender Stratocasters extensively in the early 1990s after transitioning away from Kramer guitars. He famously partnered with Fender to release his first official signature Fender Stratocaster model in 1993 featuring signature star inlays, and he played them heavily in Bon Jovi's major 1990s and 2000s tours.
- Kenny Wayne Shepherd (born 1977 Kenneth Wayne Brobst), lead guitarist and lead/backup vocalist for The Kenny Wayne Shepherd Band. Born in Shreveport, Louisiana, Kenny started his playing career at age 16, while attending Caddo Magnet High School, and has performed internationally with many of the great blues legends.
- Ty Tabor (born 1961) is a founding member of King's X who developed a signature sound on the band's first four albums using a Fender Elite Stratocaster.
- Richard Thompson (born 1949), an English musician best known for his finger-style guitar playing and songwriting, was a founding member of Fairport Convention before becoming a solo artist. For many years Thompson played a '59 Sunburst Stratocaster, with a maple '55 neck. That guitar is currently unserviceable and Thompson now uses a '64 sunburst Stratocaster with a rosewood fingerboard.
- Pete Townshend (born 1945), the guitarist for The Who, used a Fender Stratocaster during the recording sessions for "I Can See for Miles" and The Who Sell Out. During the Monterey Pop Festival in 1967, Townshend smashed a Stratocaster after the Who's set, which was immediately followed by the Jimi Hendrix Experience's performance where Hendrix also destroys a Stratocaster. Townshend has exclusively used a modified version of the Fender Eric Clapton's Signature Stratocaster since 1989.
- Robin Trower (born 1945), a British rock guitarist known for his work in the band Procol Harum and his successful solo career, has his own Signature Stratocaster made by Fender. "The sight of him onstage with his signature Stratocaster is as characteristic to his fans as his classic songs."

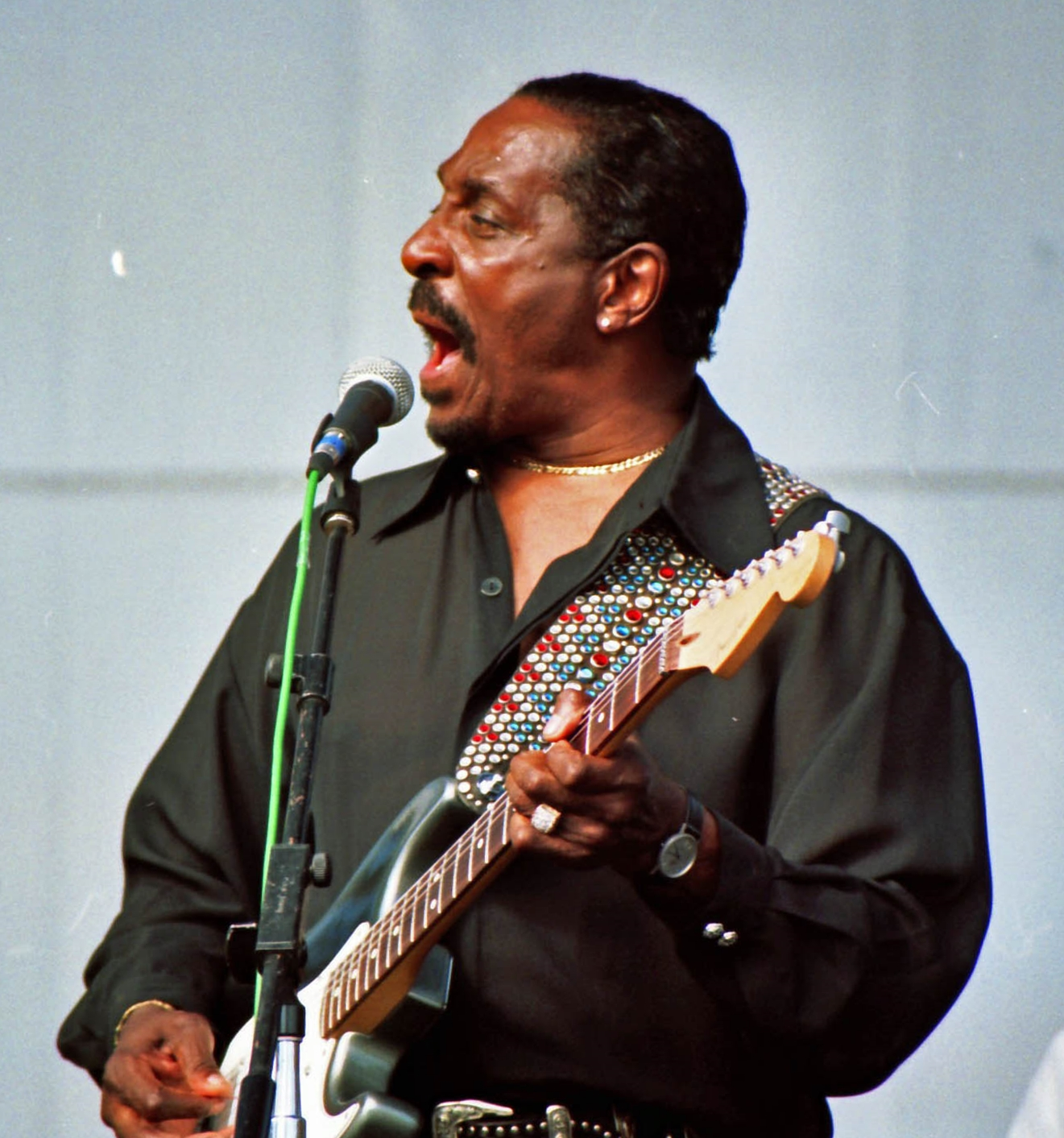
Ike Turner in 1997.

- Ike Turner (1931-2007), an American guitarist, musician, songwriter and record producer known for his work with the Ike & Tina Turner Revue and the Kings of Rhythm. Turner was an early adopter of the Stratocaster, buying one on its release in 1954. Unaware that the guitar's tremolo arm could be used to subtle effect, Turner used it to play screaming, swooping and diving solos. Turner explained his technique by saying: "I thought it was to make the guitar scream—people got so excited when I used that thing." Turner was also known to play Telecasters and Jaguars. In 2004 Fender Custom Shop produced an Ike Turner Signature Stratocaster, limited to 100.
- Ritchie Valens (1941–1959), a pioneer of rock and roll mostly famous for his Latin Rock song "La Bamba", played with a sunburst Strat.
- Eddie Van Halen (1955–2020), guitarist of hard rock band Van Halen, is notable for his "Frankenstrat", a crudely modified Stratocaster copy with the single-coil bridge pickup replaced with a PAF humbucker. This modification made the Frankenstrat one of the earliest Superstrats, which are guitars with a Stratocaster body but different features. A replica of his guitar is located in the National Museum of American History part of the Smithsonian Institution in Washington, D.C.
- Jimmie Vaughan (born 1951) is known to strongly favour Stratocasters over other guitars, unusually preferring a high action. Since 1997, Fender has produced a Jimmie Vaughan Tex-Mex Stratocaster, and there has also been a Limited Series made, intended to be a faithful reproduction of his 1958 model.
- Stevie Ray Vaughan (1954–1990), known for his Texas blues style guitar playing, was an American blues guitarist who is considered highly influential for his driving guitar style soaked with rhythmic style playing. Vaughan was noted for playing a Stratocaster equipped with a left-handed vibrato system. He was also known for tuning his guitar down a half-step and using heavy .13 gauge strings.
- Cory Wong (born 1985/86), rhythm guitarist for Vulfpeck, and known for his clean funk 'lead rhythm' guitar style, used Stratocasters throughout his career. In 2021, Fender released the Cory Wong Signature Stratocaster. A unique feature of this model is the 'fourth position panic button', which uses one of the tone controls to "lock" the guitar in fourth position, and disables the selector switch.
- Ronnie Wood (born 1947), guitarist playing with the Rolling Stones since 1975. Wood's main stage instruments are 1954 and 1955 Sunburst Strats. He also uses a 52 Telecaster.
- James "J.Y." Young (born 1949), guitarist of multi-platinum rock band Styx, has been using a Stratocaster as his principal guitar almost exclusively since 1967.

== See also ==
- List of Telecaster players
- List of guitarists

== Sources ==
- Chapman, Richard (2003). Guitar: Music, History, Players. DK publishing. ISBN 0-7894-9700-X.
- Bacon, Tony (2000). 50 Years of Fender: Half a Century of the Greatest Electric Guitars. Balafon. ISBN 0-87930-621-1.
- Bacon, Tony (2006). Electric Guitars:The Illustrated Encyclopedia. Thunder Bay Press. ISBN 1-59223-053-9.
- Bennett, Joe (2002). Guitar Facts. Hal Leonard Corporation. ISBN 0-634-05192-X.
- Duchossoir, A.R. (1994). The Fender Stratocaster: A complete guide to the history and evolution of the world's most famous guitar. Hal Leonard Corporation. ISBN 0-7935-4735-0.
- Kitts, Jeff; Tolinski, Brad (2002). The 100 Greatest Guitarists of All Time!. Hal Leonard Corporation. ISBN 0-634-04619-5.
- Marten, Neville (2007). Guitar Heaven. HarperCollins. ISBN 978-0-06-135944-6.
- Prown, Pete; Newquist, H.P.; Eiche, Jon F. (1997). Legends of Rock Guitar: The Essential Reference of Rock's Greatest Guitarists. Hal Leonard Corporation. ISBN 0-7935-4042-9.
- Ferguson, Jim (1983). The Guitar Player Book-Revised Third Edition. GPI Publications. ISBN 0-394-62490-4.
