= Gallion =

Gallion may refer to:

- Gallion, Alabama, a community in Hale County, Alabama
- Gallion (plant genus), a former genus in the family Rubiaceae

== People with the surname ==
- Arthur Gallion (1902–1978), American architect
- Bob Gallion (1924–1999), American country music singer
- Jérôme Gallion (born 1955), French rugby union player
- Josh Gallion (born 1979), American politician
- MacDonald Gallion (1913–2007), Alabama Attorney General
- Rex Gallion (1915–1975), American country-western guitarist

== See also ==
- Galleon, a ship
- Gallon, unit of measure
