= Stevie Ray Vaughan Stratocaster =

Fender Stratocaster signature model

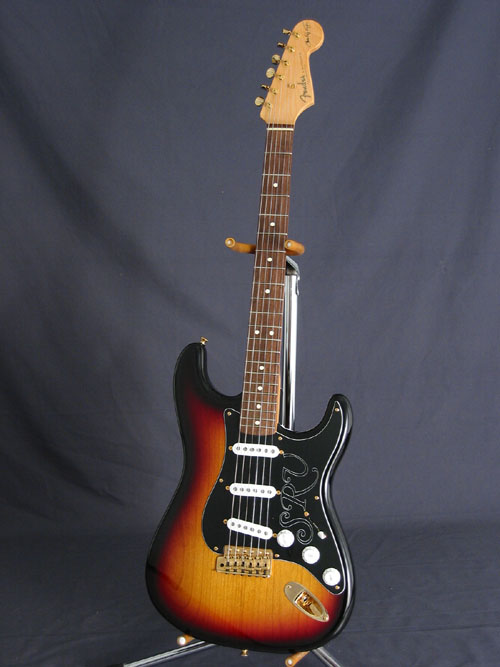
- 2003 Stevie Ray Vaughan Stratocaster
- Manufacturer: Fender
- Period: 1992—present

Construction
- Body type: Solid
- Neck joint: Bolt-on

Woods
- Body: Alder
- Neck: Maple
- Fretboard: Pau ferro or Brazilian rosewood

Hardware
- Bridge: Left-handed American vintage synchronized tremolo
- Pickup(s): Three Texas Special single-coils

Colors available
- Three-color sunburst

The Stevie Ray Vaughan Stratocaster is the signature model electric guitar of American guitarist Stevie Ray Vaughan, based on his favorite guitar, Number One. The guitar debuted at the NAMM Show in January 1992 and began selling at various music stores.

Number One, also called First Wife, was the nickname given by Vaughan to his favorite Fender Stratocaster, built c. 1963. In 1974, he acquired the guitar as a trade at a music store in Austin, Texas. In 1990, it was retired due to many replacements of frets, though he continued to play it occasionally. In 1992, the Stevie Ray Vaughan Stratocaster was released, based on the specifications of Number One. Vaughan used Number One on almost every recording with Double Trouble.

== Background ==
In the late 1980s, Fender had informally planned to release a standard Stevie Ray Vaughan Stratocaster, with 500 limited edition tribute guitars being produced by the Fender Custom Shop. The project was delayed until 1990, when Fender presented Vaughan with three prototypes of his signature guitar on June 7, 1990, backstage at the taping of The Tonight Show Starring Johnny Carson. With the notable "SRV" stickers on the pickguard being completely worn off, Vaughan requested for replacement stickers to the staff of The Tonight Show, giving him Letraset script-style lettering. Vaughan liked the lettering so much that he proposed that the lettering be engraved into the pickguard, as it appears today.

The signature model didn't go into production until 1991 at the direction of Vaughan's brother Jimmie. The Stevie Ray Vaughan Stratocaster made its debut at the NAMM Show in January 1992, with Double Trouble drummer Chris Layton, Jimmie, Buddy Guy, Albert Collins, and Eric Gales attending the event.

== Features ==
The final product is essentially what Number One would be if brand new, featuring an alder body with a three-color sunburst and a polyurethane varnish; a thick, oval-shaped maple neck finished in a polyurethane gloss with 21 Dunlop 6105 narrow jumbo frets, 12" radius, and pau ferro fingerboard. Earlier models featured a Brazilian rosewood fingerboard. Three Texas Special single coil pickups were wired into the guitar, similar to the original 1959 pickups in Vaughan's "Number One" guitar. Other unique features include gold plated hardware, left-handed vintage synchronized tremolo, and the "SRV" script-style initials engraved into the pickguard.

== Limited Edition "Number One" Tribute Guitar ==
A team from Fender visited Jimmie Vaughan in Austin to examine the original Number One. They recorded every aspect, recording the output of each pickup, weighing the wood and hardware, measuring the shape of the neck, and using calipers to reproduce every scratch, dent, or wear on the guitar.

In November 2003, the Fender Custom Shop announced a limited run of 100 Number One tribute Stratocasters. They debuted at the NAMM Show on January 15, 2004. The original Number One was thoroughly examined and measured for the reproduction. The Number One tribute Strats were constructed by master builder John Cruz, who made all of the 100 replicas. Each guitar was priced at $10,000.

== See also ==
- Stevie Ray Vaughan's musical instruments
