= Rex Gallion =

American singer-songwriter

Rex Robert Gallion (October 2, 1915 – February 8, 1975) was a country-western guitarist who, along with Bill Carson and Freddie Tavares, collaborated with Leo Fender in the early 1950s on the design of the Stratocaster electric guitar.

Gallion was a studio musician, specialising in country and western, who became best known to the public as a guitarist for the popular 1940's radio music program, Dude Martin and His Roundup Gang.

Gallion was also a retained musician for the Fender Musical Instruments Corporation, playing the Telecaster. Approached by Leo Fender to assess his early design of the Stratocaster, Gallion asked Fender, "Why not get away from a body that is always digging into your ribs?" As a result, the team developed the evolution of the "Custom Contour" body. In 1954/5 Fender developed a series of pre-production prototype Startocaster guitars which were designed specifically for special customers. Fender gifted Gallion an all-white Stratocaster with gold metal work, serial number 0001. After passing through various owners, it ended up with Phil Taylor, the chief backline technician for British rock group Pink Floyd and the personal guitar technician for David Gilmour. Gilmour bought the guitar from Taylor, later using it to record the band's hit single Another Brick in the Wall. Gilmour sold the guitar in 2019 via an auction at Christie's New York to raise money for his charitable foundation, where its hammer price was $1,815,000 plus commission and taxes.
