= Fender Stratocaster =

Solid-body electric guitar

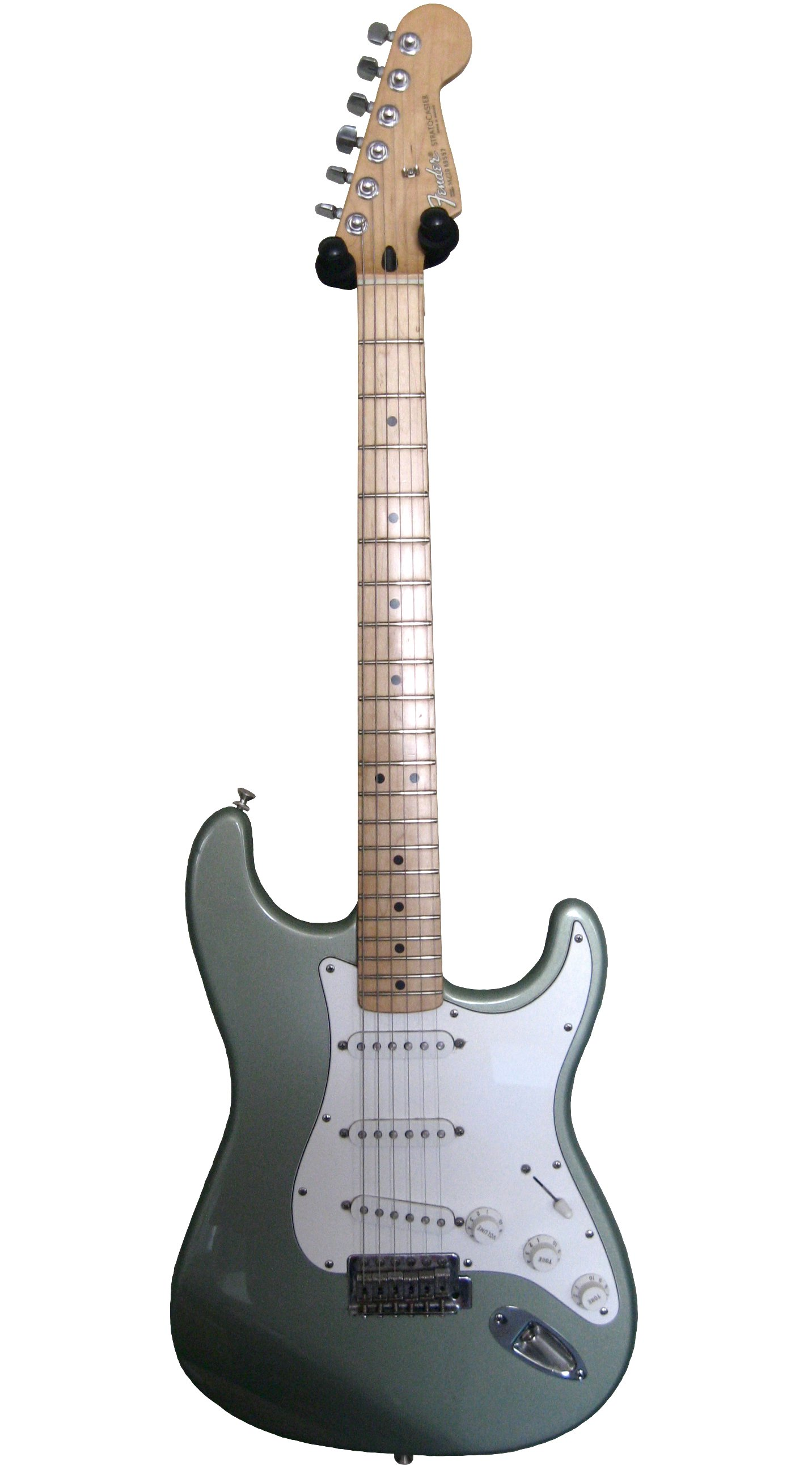
- Manufacturer: Fender
- Period: 1954–present

Construction
- Body type: Solid
- Neck joint: Bolt-on
- Scale: 25.5 inches (647.7 mm)

Woods
- Body: Most commonly alder or ash. Other woods have also been used.
- Neck: Maple
- Fretboard: Most commonly maple, rosewood, or pau ferro

Hardware
- Bridge: Most commonly proprietary six-screw 'tremolo'. Other bridge configurations are available.
- Pickup: Traditionally three single coil guitar pickups (SSS). Other pickup configurations are also available.

Colors available
- Originally two- or three-tone sunburst; many other colors subsequently produced. In the '60s and early '70s, custom colors such as black or lake placid blue were sprayed on failed sunburst bodies, as a cost-cutting measure.

The Fender Stratocaster, colloquially known as the Strat, is a model of double-cutaway electric guitar designed between 1952 and 1954 by Leo Fender, Bill Carson, Rex Gallion, George Fullerton, and Freddie Tavares. The Fender Musical Instruments Corporation has continuously manufactured the Stratocaster since 1954.

The guitar's distinctive body shape was revolutionary for the mid-1950s. The heavily contoured back was designed for better comfort while playing. The elongated top horn changes the balance when played standing up with a strap compared to the preceding model, the Fender Telecaster. While the original release of the Stratocaster included a vibrato system, Stratocasters without it ("hardtails") were added to the portfolio in March 1955. The modular nature of the guitar, with its easily removable components, enabled players and luthiers to perform numerous modifications to their own guitars, changing out pickups or necks to fit the needs of the player. All of these design elements were popularized and later became industry standards due to the success of the Stratocaster.

Many prominent rock musicians have been associated with the Stratocaster for use in studio recording and live performances, most notably Jimi Hendrix, David Gilmour, Eric Clapton, Buddy Holly, George Harrison, Mark Knopfler, Stevie Ray Vaughan, Eric Johnson, John Frusciante, Kevin Parker, Yngwie Malmsteen and Jeff Beck.

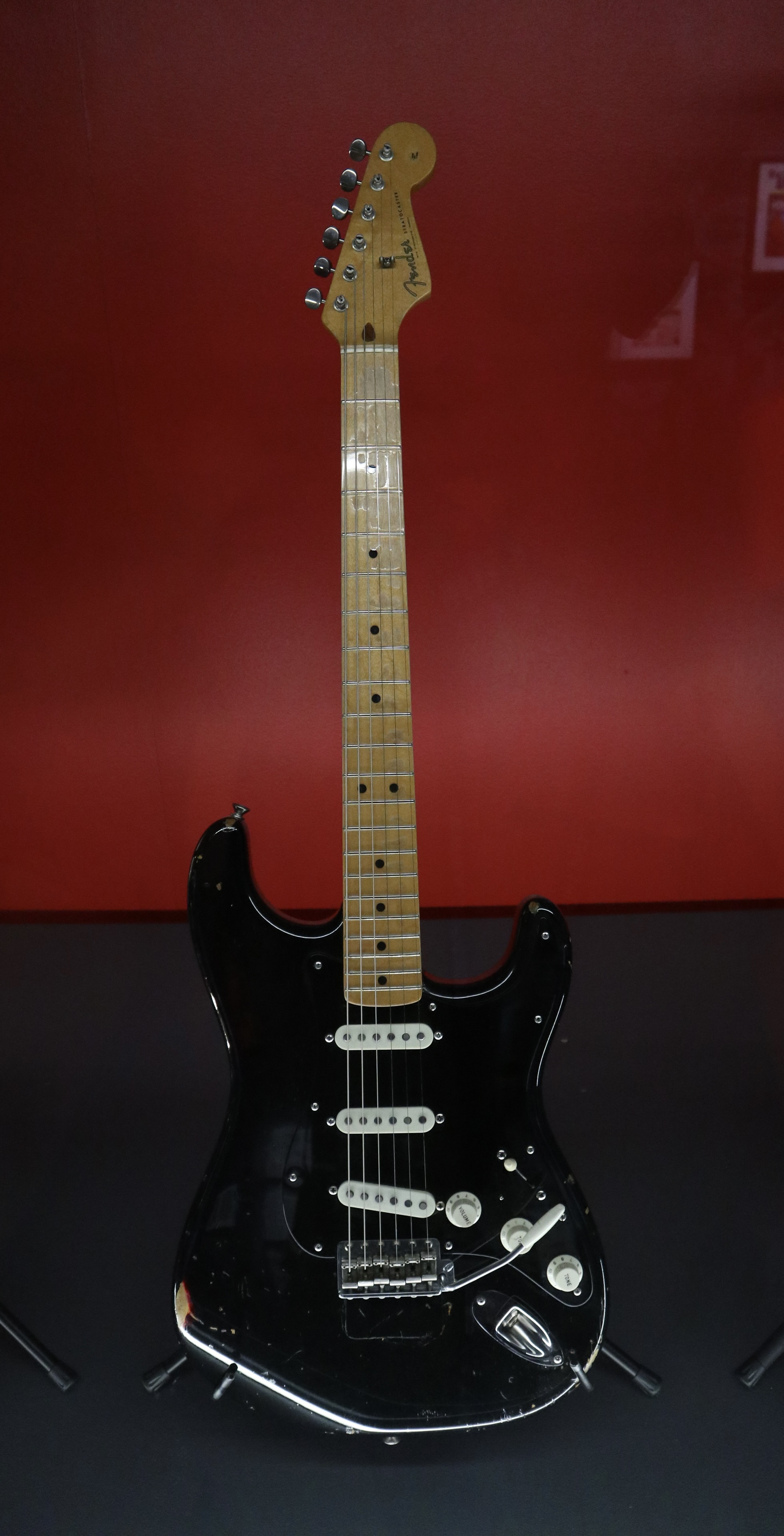
David Gilmour's 1969 The Black Strat

The Fender Stratocaster is one of the most iconic electric guitar models of all time, and along with the Gibson Les Paul, Gibson SG, and Fender Telecaster, it is one of the most-often emulated electric guitar shapes. It is a patented design, and "Stratocaster" and "Strat" are Fender trademarks. Therefore, imitations by other manufacturers must be shaped slightly differently, and are sometimes called S-Type or ST-type guitars, while the term "Superstrat" typically refers to third-party Stratocaster look-alikes from the 1980s onwards with innovative features such as new types of bridges or pick-up configurations. Some of these features were subsequently also offered on Fender Stratocaster models or those made under the Fender-owned brand, Squier, and the Superstrat term is sometimes also applied to these Fender and Squier models.

The Stratocaster was named by Don Randall and the name inspired by the stratosphere.

== Overall design ==
The archetypal Stratocaster is a solid-body electric guitar with a contoured asymmetric double-cutaway body with an extended upper horn; the body is usually made from alder or ash. The neck is usually made from maple and attached to the body with screws, and has a distinctive headstock with six tuning pegs mounted inline along a single side; the fingerboard may be maple or another wood, e.g., rosewood, and has at least twenty-one frets. The Stratocaster's body is front-routed for electronics, which are mounted in a plastic pickguard. Most Stratocasters have three single-coil pickups, a pickup selector switch, one volume control and two tone controls. Bridges generally come in two designs: the more common pivoting "tremolo" bridges, (Note: The terminology is technically incorrect, because systems such as this produce a vibrato effect, changing the pitch of the note, and not a tremolo effect, which would vary the volume instead. Nonetheless, the incorrect terminology is common.) and the less common "hardtail" fixed bridge. Both types of bridge have six individually adjustable saddles whose height and intonation can be set independently. Early models of the Stratocaster came with a removable metal cover plate that fit over the bridge. The plate tended to get in the way of important playing techniques such as palm muting, so many players removed it. By the late 1970s, Fender stopped shipping guitars with the bridge cover plate, though some more modern reissue and custom shop models still have them. The innovative tremolo system is balanced by springs mounted in a rear cavity. The output jack is mounted in a recess in the front of the guitar body. Many different colors have been available. The Stratocaster's scale length is 25.5 inches (648 mm).

Fender released countless variations of the Stratocaster over the years that differed in pickup configuration, types of wood, tuning pegs and modifications to the electronics.

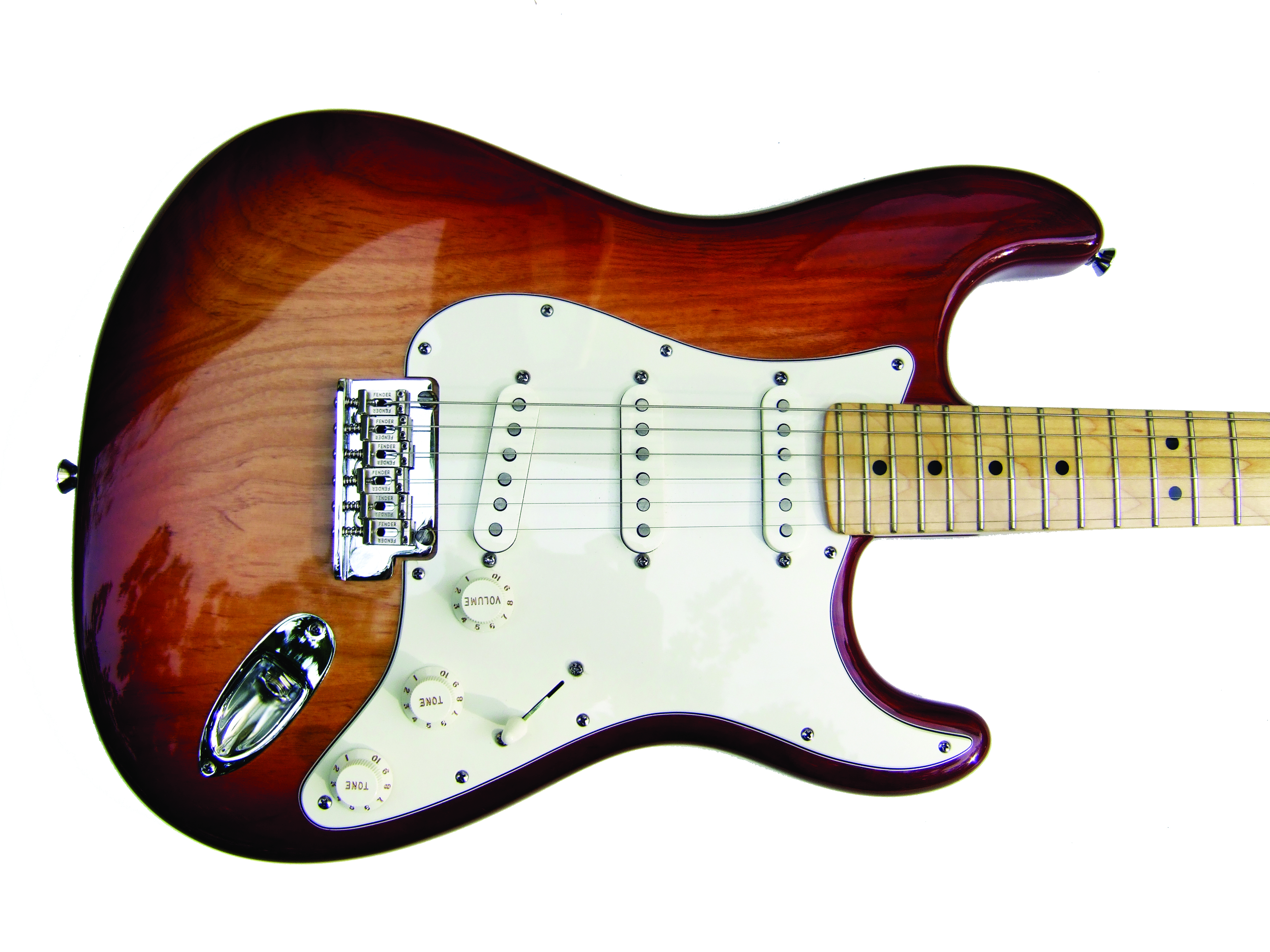
Body and electronics

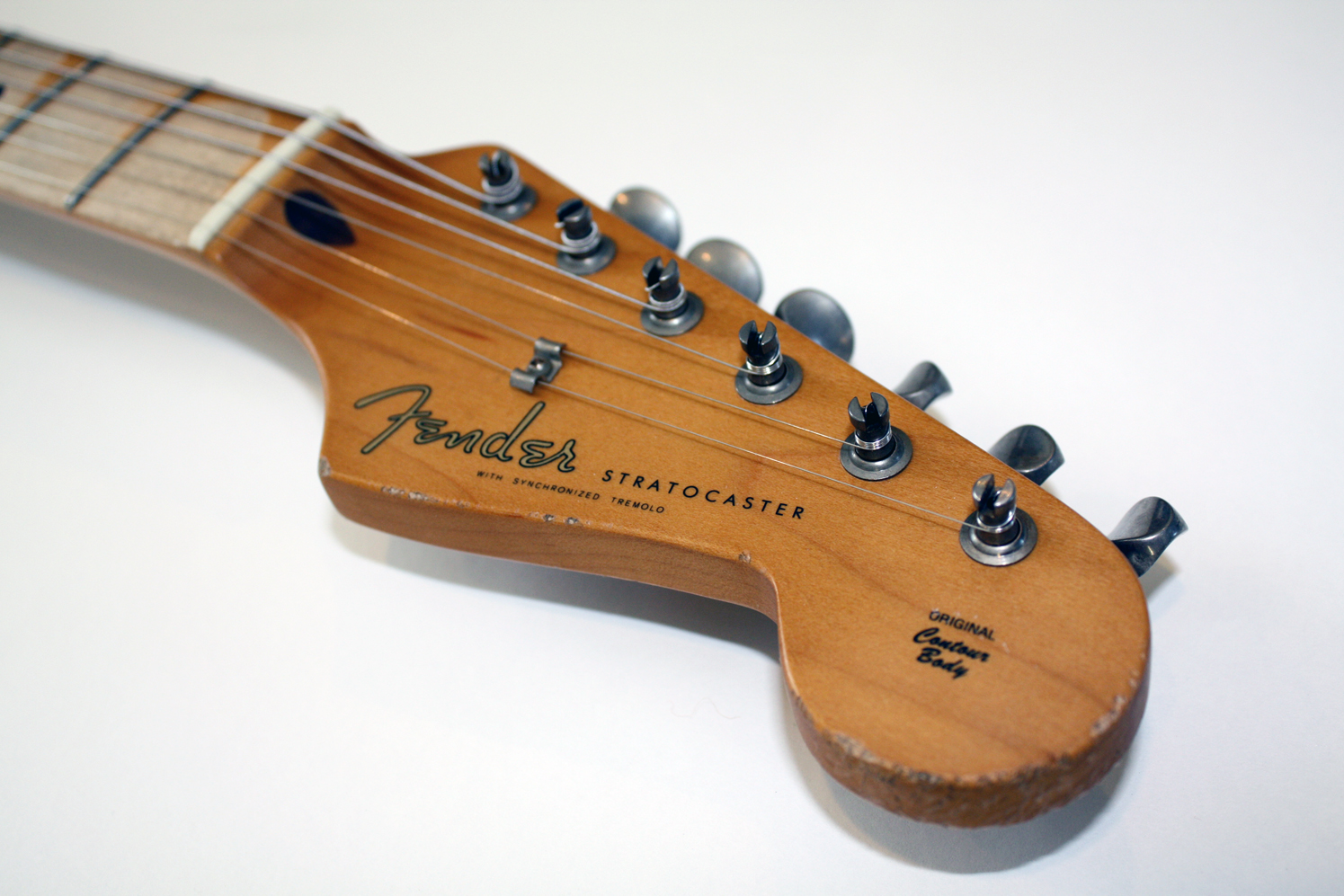
Headstock and tuning pegs

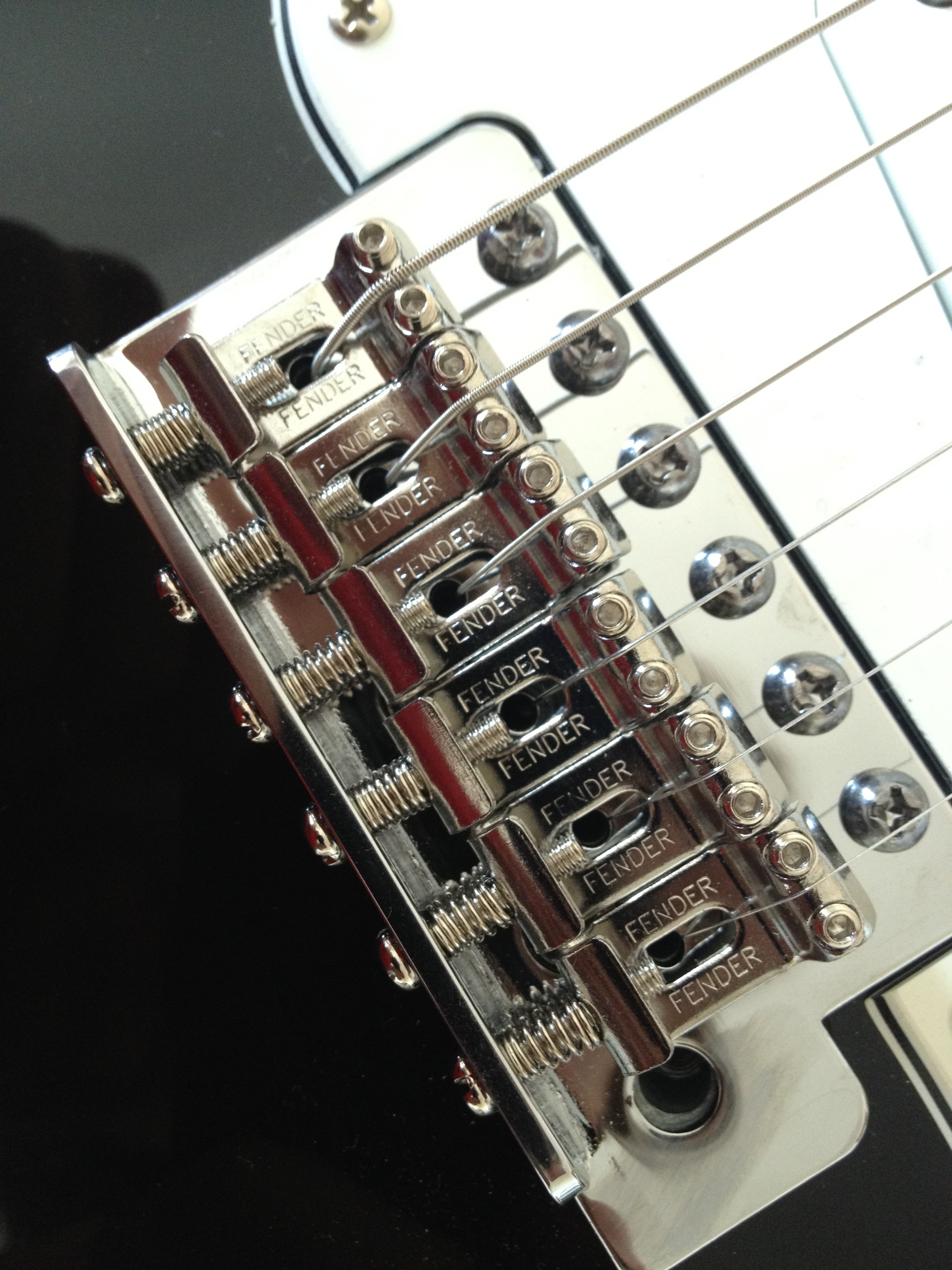
Six-point "tremolo" bridge

== History ==
=== 1954–1984 ===
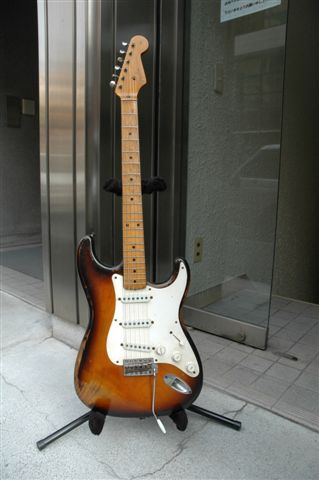
1954 Stratocaster, with ash body, maple fingerboard and two-color sunburst finish

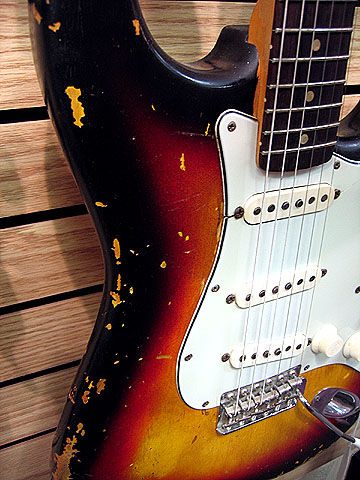
Early 1960s Stratocaster with rosewood fingerboard and three-ply pickguard. The nitrocellulose lacquer shows characteristic chipping from use

The Stratocaster was the first Fender guitar to feature three pickups and a spring tension vibrato system, as well as being the first Fender with a contoured body. The Stratocaster's sleek, contoured body shape (officially referred to by Fender as the "Original Contour Body") differed from the flat, squared edge design of the Telecaster.

The first model offered for sale was the 1954 Fender Stratocaster. The design featured a solid, deeply contoured ash body, a 21-fret one-piece maple neck with black dot inlays, and Kluson SafeTi String post tuning machines. The color was originally a two-color, dark brown-to-golden yellow sunburst pattern, although custom color guitars were produced (An example is Eldon Shamblin's gold Stratocaster, dated June 1954).

In 1956, Fender began using alder for sunburst and most custom-color Stratocaster bodies. Ash needed grain filler and sanding blocks for contour sanding, though it was still used on translucent blonde instruments.

In 1957, the neck shape took a more "V-shaped" feel with deeper body carves on the guitar a noted feature.

In 1959, Fender introduced a thick Brazilian rosewood fretboard to the Stratocaster, now colloquially referred to as a "slab-board". This thicker board lasted until 1962, when the fretboard was made with a thinner 'veneer' of Brazilian Rosewood. Nearly all of the 1960s models of the Stratocaster had a rosewood fretboard, and maple fretboards would not be re-introduced in large numbers until 1970.

In 1960, the available custom colors were standardized with a paint chip chart, many of which were Duco automobile lacquer colors from DuPont available at an additional 5% cost. Inter-departmental DuPont support research provided a flexible basecoat for their wood applications.

A single-ply, eight-screw hole white pickguard (changed to an 11-hole three-ply in late 1959) held all electronic components except the recessed jack plate, facilitating assembly.

The 1963 Fender Stratocaster shows a change in design from the 1950s models including Clay Dot inlays, a 3 tone sunburst finish on an Alder body and Kluson tuners.

To summarize, the specific features in the evolution of the Fender Stratocaster between 1954 and 1979 included:

Neck/fretboard

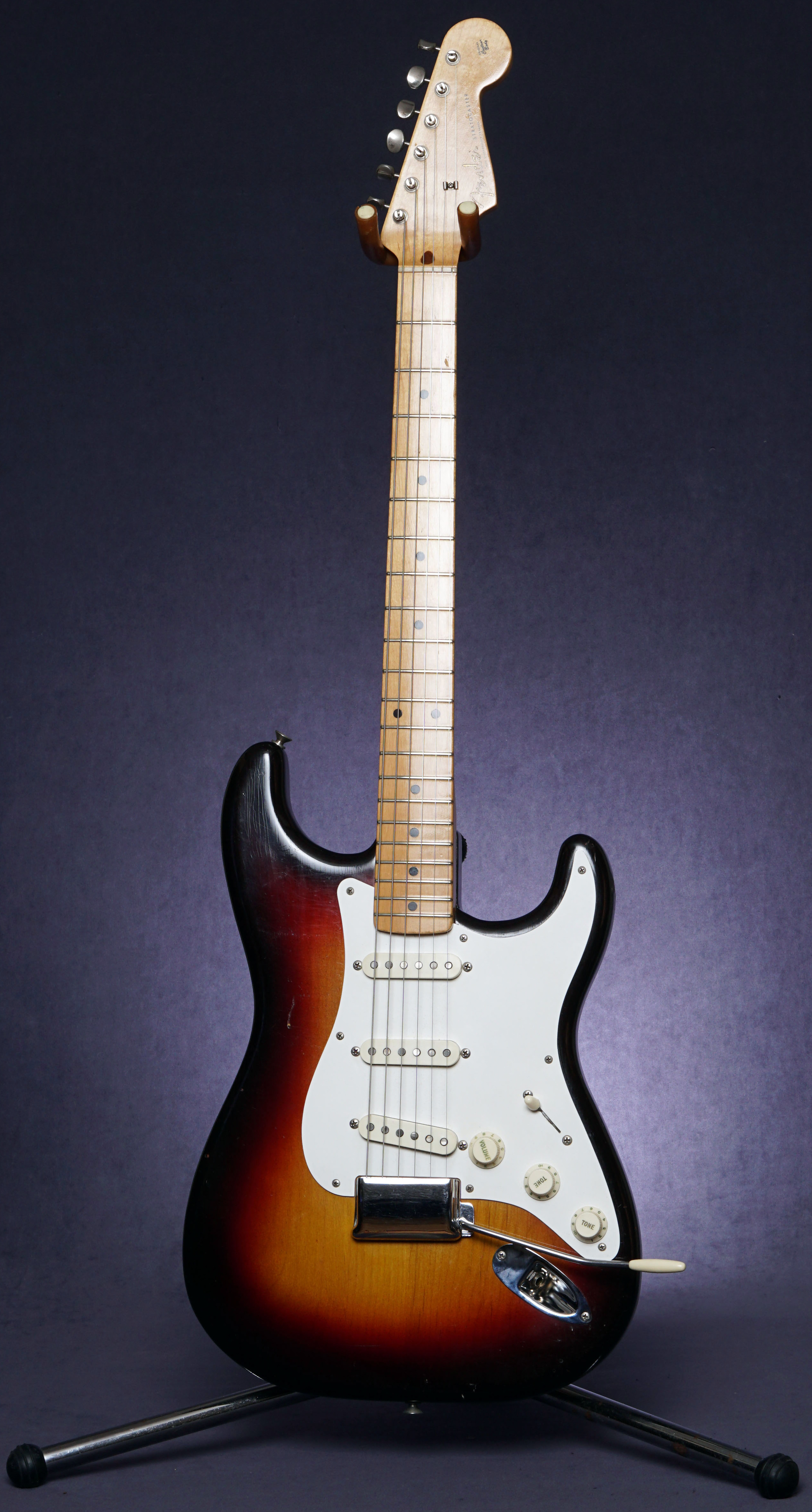
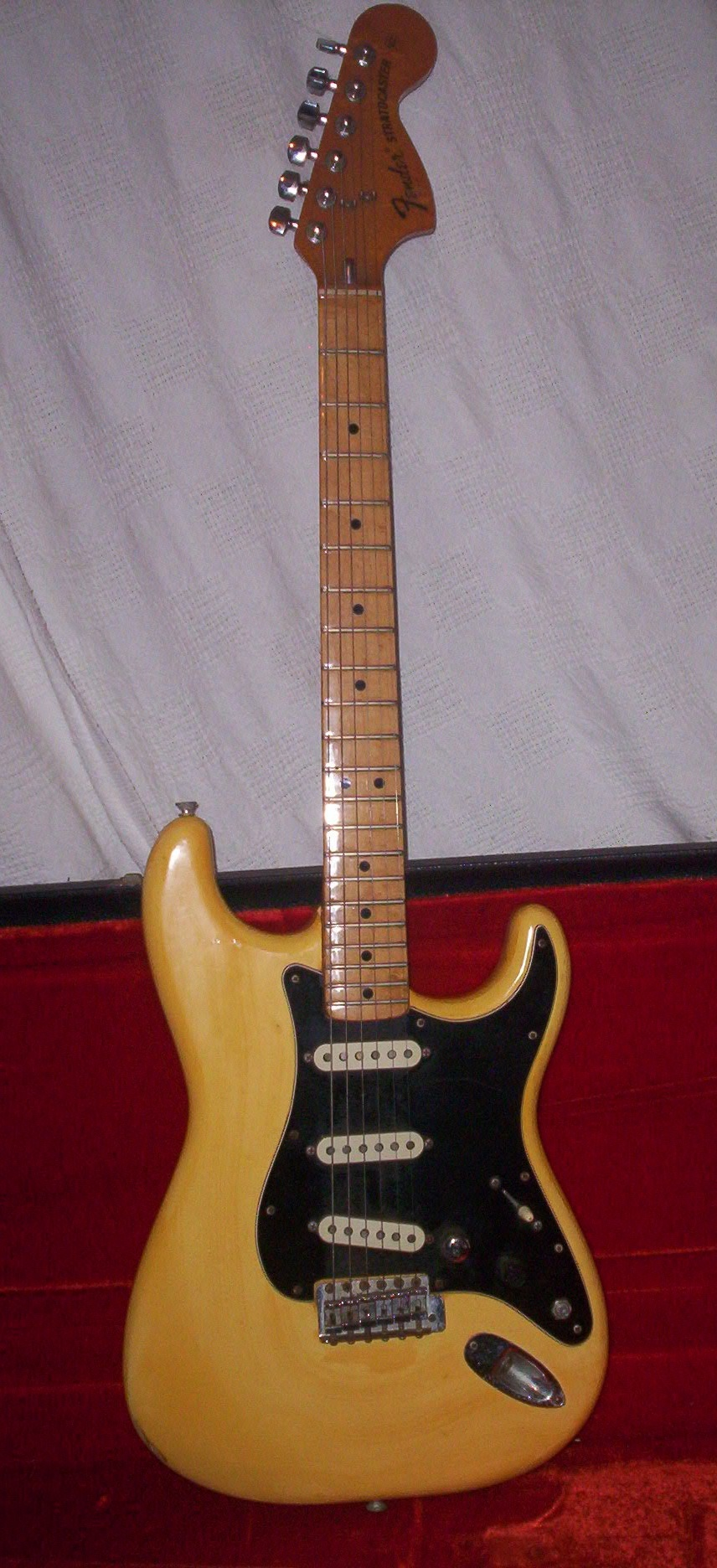
(Left): Late 1950s Stratocaster with original headstock; (right): 1970s Stratocaster with large "CBS" headstock, "bullet" truss rod and die-cast bridge.
- 1954–1959, one piece maple necks (including fretboard);
- 1959–1962, thick Brazilian rosewood (Dalbergia nigra) fretboard known as a "slab-board";
- 1962–1966, thin Brazilian rosewood fretboard known as a "veneer-board";
- 1966–1969, Indian rosewood or optional separate laminated "maple cap" fretboards;

Pickup selector

- 1954–1977, three way pickup selector switch;
- 1977–present, five way pickup selector switch.

Tuners

- 1954–1967, Kluson tuners;
- 1967–1982, Fender "F" Tuners

Back plate

- 1954–1971, 4 bolt back plate at neck joint;
- 1971–1981, 3 bolt back plate with MicroTilt neck tilt or angle adjuster and "Bullet" truss rod nut;

Logo and headstock

- 1954–1964, Spaghetti logo on the headstock;
- 1964–1967, gold "transition" logo on the headstock with small writing of the word "Stratocaster";
- 1965–1981, headstock enlarged on the treble side, now matching the Jazzmaster and Jaguar
- 1968–1982, black CBS logo with larger printed "STRATOCASTER" on the headstock;

Leo Fender made very few alterations to the basic design of the Fender Stratocaster (and the Telecaster for that matter) up until 1965 when the company was sold to CBS Instruments. For example, the bridge cover on the Fender Stratocaster was often taken off by players and either disposed or kept in the case. Despite full knowledge of this, Leo Fender always provided the new Fender guitars with a bridge cover to prevent corrosion on the bridge parts.

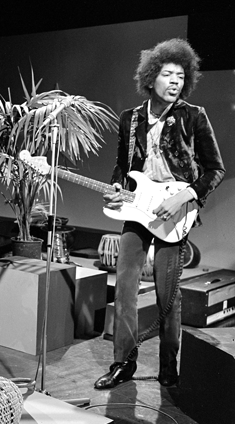
Late 1960s Stratocaster with large "CBS" headstock, played left-handed (upside-down and reverse-strung) by Jimi Hendrix

After 1965, the Fender company, under the control of CBS Instruments, saw a drop in sales of the Fender Stratocaster to customers. The Fender Jazzmaster had been promoted as the flagship guitar in the Fender line. As such, the resurgence of the Fender Stratocaster is credited to the arrival of Jimi Hendrix in the late 1960s. His remarkable playing style and musical prowess led to a dramatic increase in sales and thrust the Stratocaster into musical history as the premier electric guitar. As they followed Jimi Hendrix's popularity on TV, CBS asked for the word Stratocaster on the headstock be made larger so that people could read the model name easily.

Between the years 1954 and 1979, nearly a quarter of the Fender Stratocasters manufactured were made in a single year, in 1979. The increased 1970s production levels saw a gradual departure from the high quality instruments of the 1960s and the introduction of Japanese manufacturers into the market.

The Stratocaster features three single coil pickups, with the output originally selected by a 3-way switch. Guitarists soon discovered that by positioning the switch in between the first and second position, both the bridge and middle pickups could be selected, and similarly, the middle and neck pickups could be selected between the 2nd and 3rd position. When two pickups are selected simultaneously, they are wired in parallel which leads to a slight drop in output as slightly more current is allowed to pass to the ground. In newer guitars, since the middle pickup is almost always wired in reverse (and with its magnets having opposite polarity, this combination also being referred to as RWRP), the intermediate positions create a spaced humbucking pair, which significantly reduces 50/60 cycle hum. Fender introduced a five-way selector in 1977, making such pickup combinations more stable.

The "quacky" or "doinky" tone of the bridge and middle pickups in parallel, popularized by players such as Jimi Hendrix, Eric Clapton, Stevie Ray Vaughan, David Gilmour, Rory Gallagher, Mark Knopfler, Bob Dylan, Eric Johnson, Nile Rodgers, George Harrison, Scott Thurston, Ronnie Wood, John Mayer, Ed King, Robert Cray, can be obtained by using the pickup selector in position 2; similarly the middle and neck pickups in parallel can be obtained in position 4.

This setting's characteristic tone is not caused by any electronic phenomenon—early Stratocasters used identical pickups for all positions. This "in between" tone is caused by phase cancellation due to the physical position of the pickups along the vibrating string. The neck and middle pickups are each wired to a tone control that incorporates a single, shared tone capacitor, whereas the bridge pickup, which is slanted towards the high strings for a more trebly sound, has no tone control for maximum brightness.

On many modern Stratocasters, the first tone control affects the neck pickup; the second tone control affects the middle and bridge pickups; on some Artist Series models (e.g. Buddy Guy signature guitar), the first tone control is a presence circuit that cuts or boosts treble and bass frequencies, affecting all the pickups; the second tone control is an active midrange booster that boosts the midrange frequencies up to 25dB (12dB on certain models) to produce a fatter humbucker-like sound.

Dick Dale was a prominent Stratocaster player who also collaborated with Leo Fender in developing the Fender Showman amplifier. In the early 1960s, the instrument was also championed by Hank Marvin, guitarist for the Shadows, a band that originally backed Cliff Richard and then produced instrumentals of its own. In December 1964, George Harrison and John Lennon acquired Stratocasters and used them for "Help!", and onwards. The double unison guitar solo on "Nowhere Man", was played by Harrison and Lennon on their new Stratocasters.

After Jimi Hendrix started using the Stratocaster, Eric Clapton started using it as well, on famous songs such as ”Layla”, “Wonderful Tonight” and ”Cocaine”, playing his famous 2-tone sunburst with maple fretboard Stratocaster Brownie and his famous black Strat made from multiple ‘50s Stratocasters Blackie.

After the introduction of the Fender Stratocaster Ultra series in 1989, ebony was officially selected as a fretboard material on some models (although several Elite Series Stratocasters manufactured in 1983/84 such as the Gold and Walnut were available with a stained ebony fretboard).

=== 1985–present ===
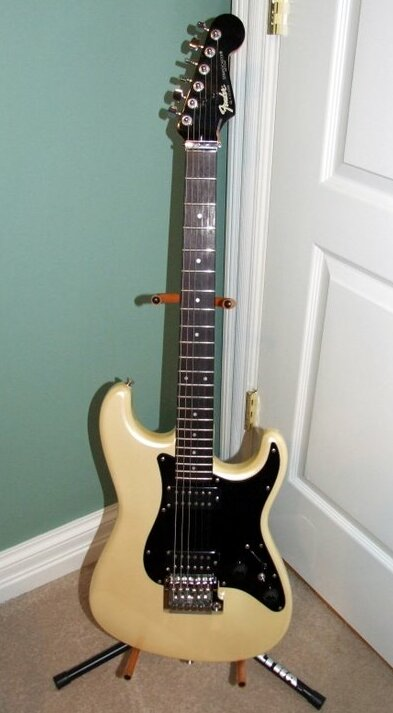
1985 "Contemporary" Stratocaster with original (pre-CBS) headstock shape, locking tremolo and humbuckers

During the CBS era, particularly the 1970s, the perceived quality of Fender instruments fell. During this time, vintage instruments from the pre-CBS era became popular.

When the Fender company was bought from CBS by a group of investors and employees headed by Bill Schultz in 1985, manufacturing resumed its former high quality, and Fender was able to regain market share and brand reputation. Dan Smith, with the help of John Page, proceeded to work on a reissue of the most popular guitars of Leo Fender's era. Among the guitars and basses selected were two Vintage reissue Stratocaster models, the one-piece maple neck 1957 and a rosewood-fretboard 1962. Fender's Fullerton plant closed its doors in late 1984.

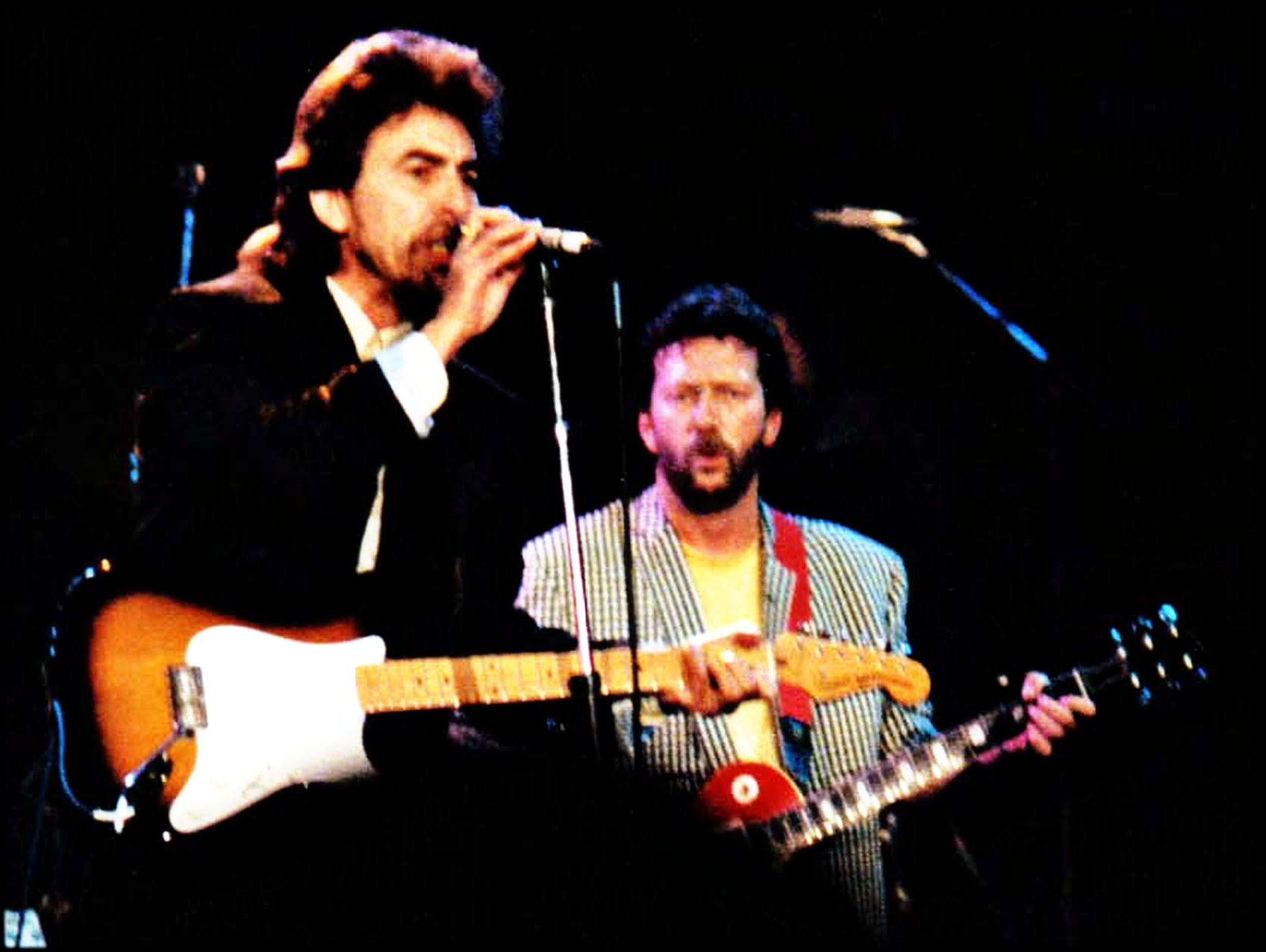
George Harrison and Eric Clapton performing in 1987. Harrison is playing a Stratocaster, and Clapton is well known for his use of the guitar model

In 1985, Fender's US production of the Vintage reissues resumed into a new 14,000 square feet (1,300 m^{2}) factory at Corona, California, located about 20 miles (32 km) away from Fullerton. Some early reissues from 1986 were crafted with leftover parts from the Fullerton factory. Fender released their first Stratocaster signature guitar for Eric Clapton in 1988.

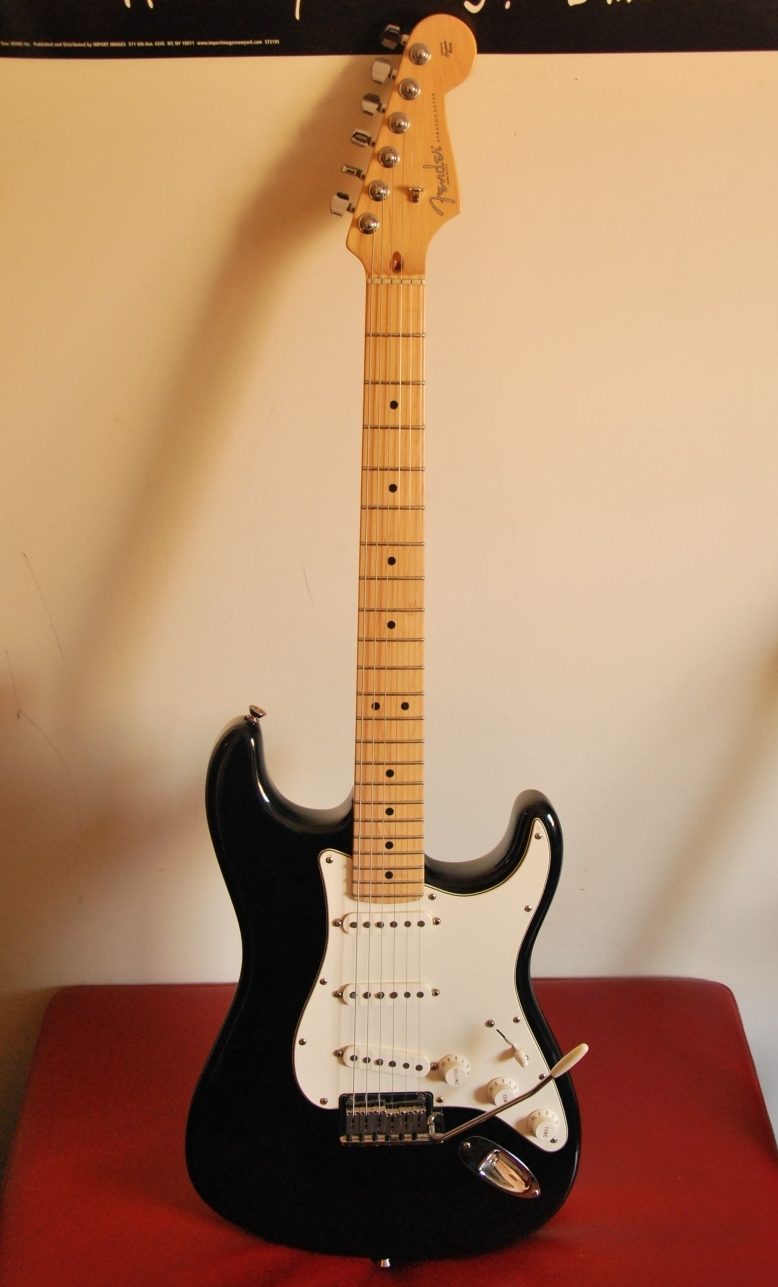
Post-1987 "American Standard" Stratocaster with two-point tremolo system and truss-rod adjustment at nut; fingerboard is maple, but rosewood is equally common

A popular Fender Reissue Stratocaster was the '57 American Vintage Reissue. The company regarded 1957 as a benchmark year for the Strat. The original specifications were used, with three 57/62 pickups, aged pickup covers and knobs, a tinted 7.25" radius, 21 fret maple neck, an ashtray bridge cover, and three position switch (with five-position switch kit included). The colors included white blonde, two-color sunburst, black, ocean turquoise, surf green, and ice blue metallic. The '57 Vintage Reissue Stratocaster was discontinued in 2012.

As well as the vintage reissues, Fender launched an updated model in 1987: the American Standard Stratocaster. This was tailored to the demands of modern players, notably having a flatter fingerboard, a thinner neck profile and an improved tremolo system. This model line has been continuously improved and remained in production until late 2016. The model line received upgrades in 2000, when it was renamed as the American Series Stratocaster, and again in 2008, when the American Standard name was restored.

In 2017, the American Standard Stratocaster was replaced by the American Professional Stratocaster, with narrow frets, a fatter 'deep C' neck profile and V-Mod pickups. Various other modern American-made Stratocasters have been produced. As of 2019, these include the more affordable American Performer Stratocaster (successor to the Highway One and American Special Stratocasters) and the more expensive American Ultra Stratocaster (successor to the American Elite Stratocaster).

Fender has also manufactured guitars in East Asia, notably Japan, and in Mexico, where the affordable Player (successor to Standard) series guitars are built. In 2021, Fender released the Player Plus series featuring noiseless pickups, locking tuners, and a 12" radius, to be available alongside the basic Player model.

The most expensive Stratocaster ever sold, and most expensive guitar ever sold at the time was David Gilmour’s Black Strat selling for US$3.975 million in 2019 to guitar collector and Indianapolis Colts owner Jim Irsay, who exhibited the guitar as part of The Jim Irsay Collection.

=== Fender Strat Plus Series ===
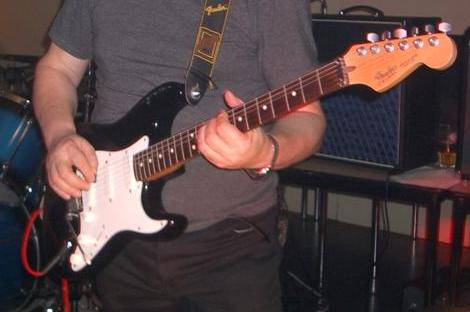
A black Fender Strat Plus from 1989 with Gold Lace Sensors and a rosewood fingerboard

Fender has produced various 'deluxe' modern American Stratocasters with special features.

The Strat Plus was produced from 1987 to 1999 and was equipped with Lace Sensor pickups, a roller nut, locking tuners, a TBX tone control and a Hipshot tremsetter. The Strat Plus Deluxe was introduced in 1989 with pickup and tremolo variations. The Strat Ultra was introduced in 1990, again with pickup variations, and also with an ebony fingerboard.

=== Fender Custom Classic Series ===
The Fender Custom Shop produced an entry level, team built Stratocaster that was discontinued in 2008. The Custom Classic Strat was intended to be a combination of the best aspects of vintage and modern Strats. The guitar boasted 3 Modern Classic pickups along with a Custom Classic 2-point tremolo with pop-in tremolo bar. The "C" Shaped neck was maple with either maple or rosewood finger board and 22 jumbo frets. The colors available were three-color sunburst, daphne blue, black, bing cherry transparent, cobalt blue transparent, and honey blonde.

=== Fender Vintera Series ===
In 2019 Fender released a range of vintage-inspired guitars including three Stratocaster models. These guitars, entitled 50's, 60's and 70's Vintera Stratocaster respectively, combined different aspects of the Stratocaster models available in each decade. These features include specific neck shapes, exclusive pickups, vintage-style six point synchronized tremolos and vintage colors. A "modified" version of the 60's version was available which included a S-1 switch incorporated in the volume knob, hotter pickups and a "Modern-C"-shaped neck.

In 2023 and 2026 the Vintera II and Vintera III series of guitars were released, again including new Stratocaster models.

== Vibrato system ==
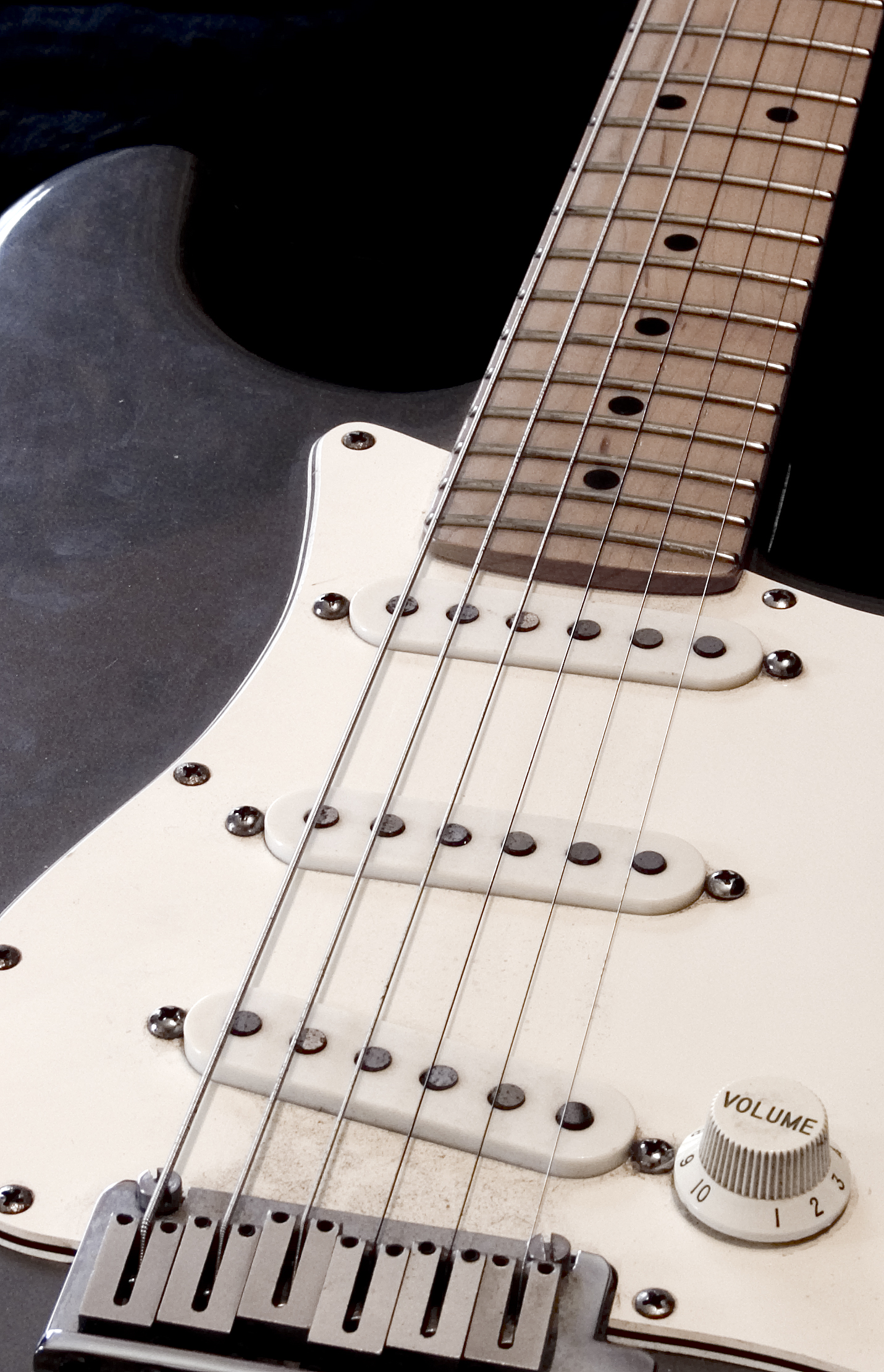
Close-up of an American Standard Stratocaster with "2-Point Deluxe Synchronized Tremolo" bridge

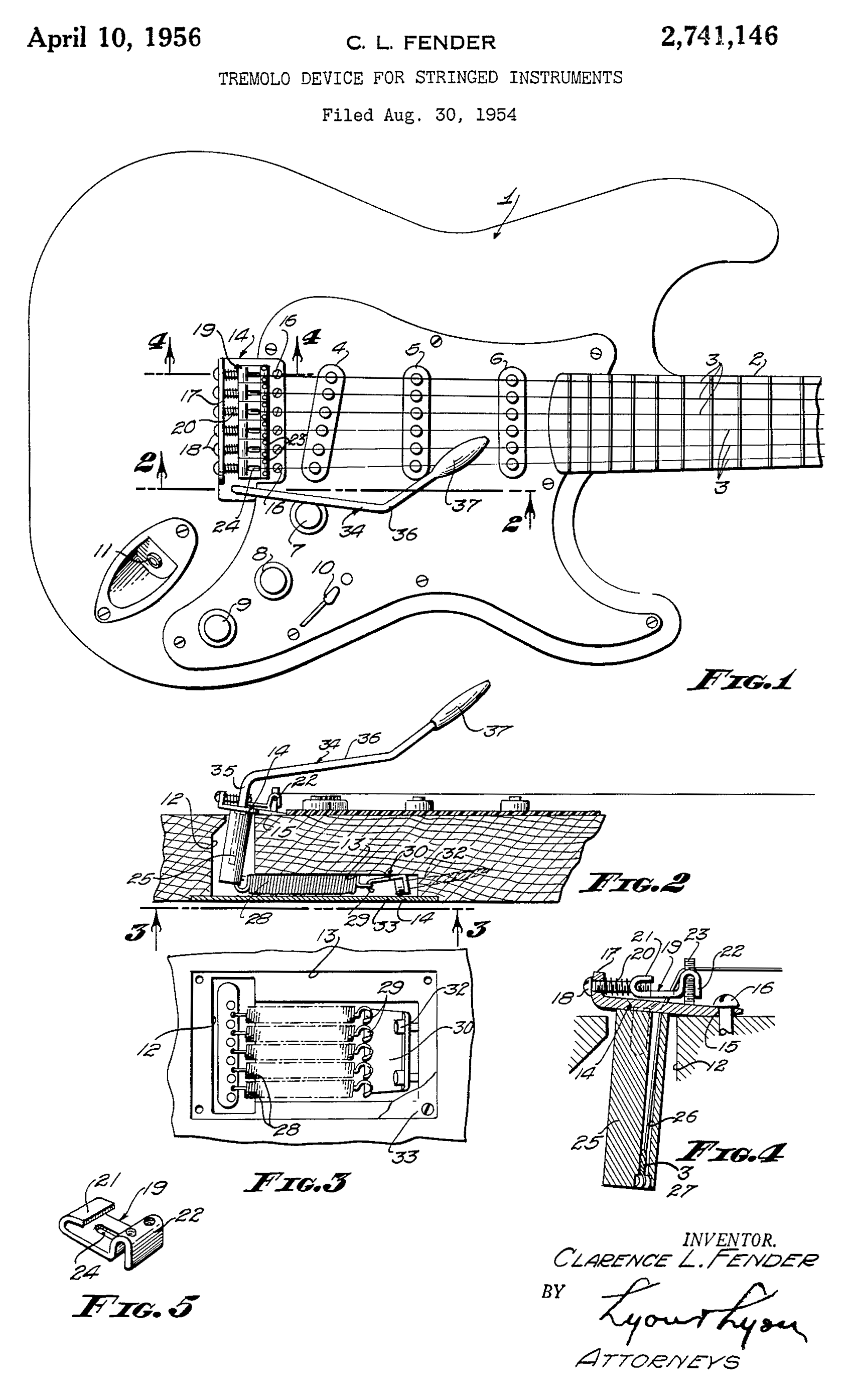
Fender's original patent diagram explaining how the vibrato system works

Original Stratocasters were manufactured with five vibrato springs (three in late 1953 prototypes) attached to a milled inertia block and anchored to the back of the body. The novel mechanism pivots on a fulcrum design with a six screw bridge plate, allowing the whole set-up to "float" while transferring the strings' energy directly into the body. Though advertised as "Tremolo" (a change in volume amplitude), vibrato is the correct term for pitch variation. In the floating position, players can move the bridge-mounted vibrato tremolo arm up or down to modulate the pitch of the notes being played. Hank Marvin, Jeff Beck and Ike Turner have used the Stratocaster's floating vibrato extensively in their playing.

Leo Fender insisted Stratocasters leave the factory floating (raised up in the back) while designer Freddie Tavares preferred it tightened flush ("decked") for full bridge plate/body contact resonance. As the bridge floats, the instrument has a tendency to go out of tune during double-stop string bends. Many Stratocaster players opt to tighten the springs (or even increase the number of springs used) so that the bridge is firmly anchored against the guitar body: in this configuration, the vibrato arm can still be used to slacken the strings and therefore lower the pitch, but it cannot be used to raise the pitch (a configuration sometimes also referred to as "dive-only").

As string gauges have changed, players have experimented with the number of springs (often four though Hendrix used five). As the average gauge has decreased over the years, modern Stratocasters are equipped with three springs as a stock option in order to counteract the reduced string tension.

Some players, such as Ronnie Wood, feel that a floating bridge has an excessive propensity to detune guitars. These guitarists inhibit the bridge's movement with a chunk of wood wedged between the bridge block and the inside cutout of the tremolo cavity, and by increasing the tension on the tremolo springs; these procedures lock the bridge in a fixed position. Some Stratocasters have a fixed bridge in place of the vibrato assembly; these are colloquially called "hard-tails". There is considerable debate about the effects on tone and sustain of the material used in the vibrato system's 'inertia bar' and many aftermarket versions are available.

== Signature models ==
Fender has released several models of Stratocaster in collaboration with famous guitarists. They include:

- Mary Kaye
- Eric Clapton
- Jeff Beck
- Dick Dale
- David Gilmour
- Rory Gallagher
- Jimi Hendrix
- Eric Johnson
- Ritchie Blackmore
- Dave Murray
- Yngwie Malmsteen
- Richie Sambora
- Bonnie Raitt
- Stevie Ray Vaughan
- The Edge
- John Mayer
- Mark Knopfler
- Lincoln Brewster
- H.E.R.
- Tom Morello
- Buddy Guy
- Jim Root
- Tom DeLonge
- Wayne Kramer
- Steve Lacy
- Albert Hammond Jr.
- Cory Wong

== Litigation ==
Fender secured a trademark on the shape of the headstock of the Stratocaster in 1991, but was denied a trademark on the body shape in a Trademark Trial and Appeal Board decision in 2009 that also included a similar denial for the Fender Precision Bass; a judge noted that the body shape "is so common that it is depicted as a generic electric guitar […] in the 1987 edition of Random House Dictionary of the English Language".

In 2025, Fender pursued legal action against a Chinese company, Yiwu Philharmonic Musical Instruments Co, that imported S-style bodies into Germany through the online platform AliExpress. As that party failed to appear in court, in December 2025 the Düsseldorf regional court (Landgericht Düsseldorf) rendered a default judgment acknowledging the body shape of the Stratocaster as a protected work of applied art. In deviation from previous legal understanding, the body shape would therefore be considered as more than functional, and be recognised as copyrighted in Germany and the European Union.

The court found the instruments in question to have been illegally copying the Stratocaster design, and prohibited the production and sale of such instruments in Germany and the EU. According to the judgement, infractions can lead to penalties of up to 250,000 Euros or prison terms.

In May 2026, it was reported that Fender had, via its legal counsel Bird & Bird, started sending cease and desist letters asking makers and sellers of S-type guitars selling in the European Union to stop and desist in their activities, with demands including the recall and destruction of all remaining inventory. This sparked a backlash among the guitar community, with musician Tim Pierce describing it as "brand suicide". Fender has argued the ruling protects "fair competition". One confirmed recipient of a cease-and-desist was PRS Guitars, manufacturer of the popular PRS Silver Sky, a Stratocaster-style guitar that has several notable differences from Fender designs. Another prominent recipient is Yamaha Corporation, whose Pacifica series features some Stratocaster-style designs.

On 22 June 2026, Thomann, the largest music retailer in Europe and owner of the Harley Benton brand of guitars, many of which have Stratocaster-style designs, announced it would be pursuing legal action against Fender in response to the cease and desist campaign. Thomann stated they were taking legal action because they were concerned the matter could "affect the future of diversity, innovation and competition in our industry", arguing that "free use of the Stratocaster as a model for one’s own creations has been and remains the basis for countless further developments from which the entire guitar world has benefited".

== See also ==
- List of Stratocaster players
- Superstrat

== Sources ==
- Babiuk, Andy (2002). Beatles gear. Hal Leonard. ISBN 978-0-87930-731-8.
- Bacon, Tony (2007). The Fender Electric Guitar Book: A Complete History of Fender Instruments (3rd ed.). Backbeat Books. ISBN 978-0-87930-897-1.
- Balmer, Paul (2007). The Fender Stratocaster Handbook: How to Buy, Maintain, Set Up, Troubleshoot, and Modify Your Strat. MBI. ISBN 978-0-7603-2983-2.
- Crowley, Walt; Crowley, William (1997). Rites of Passage: A Memoir of the Sixties in Seattle. University of Washington Press. ISBN 978-0295974934.
- Duchossoir, A. R. (1994). Hal Leonard: The Fender Stratocaster. Hal Leonard; Special 40th Anniversary Edition (1994). ISBN 0-7935-4735-0.
- Riley, Tim (2002). Tell me why: a Beatles commentary. Basic Books. ISBN 978-0-306-81120-3.
- Wheeler, Tom (2004). The Stratocaster Chronicles: Celebrating 50 Years of the Fender Strat. Hal Leonard. ISBN 978-0-634-05678-9.
- "Fender Frontline". Fender Musical Instruments Company. 2006.
- US 2,741,146, C.L. Fender, "Tremolo device for stringed instruments", issued April 10, 1956
