= Bill Carson (musician) =

American singer-songwriter

Bill Carson (July 8, 1926 – February 15, 2007), born in Meridian, Oklahoma, was a California Western swing guitarist for whom Leo Fender originally designed the Fender Stratocaster electric guitar in the early 1950s. Carson has documented his close relationship to the Strat in his autobiography, Bill Carson – My Life and Times with Fender Musical Instruments (co-written by Willie G. Moseley). In reference to the Stratocaster's "Custom Contouring", he once said, "It fits better to your body like a well tailored shirt should."
