= Freddie Tavares =

American musician and designer

- Born: Frederick Theodore Tavares; February 18, 1913; Pāʻia, Hawaii, US
- Died: July 24, 1990 (age 77); California, US
- Occupations: Guitarist; designer; engineer
- Known for: co-designer of the Fender Stratocaster

Frederick Theodore Tavares (18 February 1913 – July 24, 1990) was an American designer, engineer, and musician who played with Bing Crosby, Dean Martin, Henry Mancini and many others, and was also a key figure at Fender Musical Instruments Corporation for many decades. Tavares is perhaps best known for his role in designing Fender products including the Stratocaster electric guitar, the Precision Bass, and the Bassman amplifier.

== Biography ==
Frederick Theodore Tavares was born on February 18, 1913, in Pāʻia, Hawaii.

He was a virtuoso on the steel guitar, playing on many hundreds of recording sessions, radio broadcasts and movie soundtracks; the steel guitar figure at the beginning of every Warner Bros. Looney Tunes theatrical short was played by Tavares. He also played the bass guitar and worked professionally as a bassist.

His other credits include work with Ray Conniff, Bing Crosby, Elvis Presley, Dean Martin, The Sons of the Pioneers, "Tennessee" Ernie Ford, Spike Jones and His City Slickers, Lawrence Welk, and Henry Mancini.

Tavares worked with Leo Fender and others in the design of the Fender Stratocaster electric guitar, most notably contributing to the instrument's vibrato system. He is credited as one of the designers of the Fender Bassman amplifier by the Museum of Modern Art. He also created Fender's Custom Colors.

He died on July 24, 1990, in California at age 77.
