= List of Telecaster players =

Users of Fender Telecaster guitar

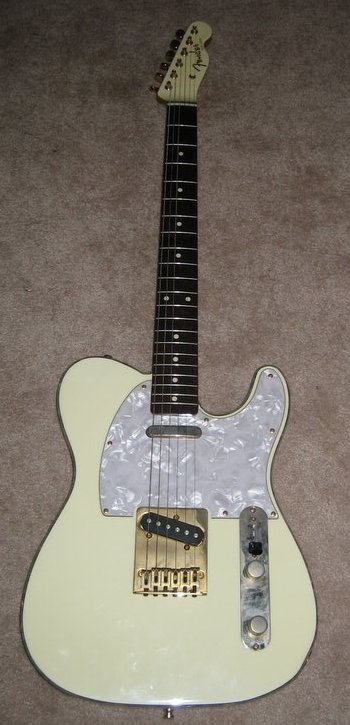
Fender Telecaster 50th Anniversary Edition

Fender Telecaster players are musicians known for playing the Telecaster, an electric guitar designed by Leo Fender, founder of Fender Musical Instruments Corporation. Also included are musicians associated with the similar Broadcaster and the Esquire guitars.

Because of the great popularity of these models, musicians are listed here only if their use of this instrument was especially significant—that is, they are players with long careers who have a history of faithful Telecaster use, or the particular guitar they used was unique or of historical importance, or their use of the Telecaster contributed significantly to the popularization of the instrument.

Esquire players are here listed alongside players of the more famous Telecaster, since Fender regards it as part of the "family of Telecaster guitars". While the one-pickup Esquire has been marketed as a separate model from the two-pickup Telecaster (which was originally named the Broadcaster) since its reintroduction in 1951, the Esquire and Telecaster are so intimately linked in their development and history, and so similar in design and tonal characteristics, that they are considered variations of the same model.

== A-E ==
- Jim Adkins (born 1975) of alternative rock/pop punk outfit Jimmy Eat World received his own signature Telecaster model after a favourite guitar of his - the Fender TC 90, itself a double-cutaway Telecaster with P90 pickups - went out of production due to low sales. Although Adkins's signature model returns to a traditional single-cut Telecaster body, it strays from traditional Telecasters on its own right as it features a shorter 24.75" scale length and a set neck more common in Gibson-style guitars.
- Nicholaus Arson (born 1977) guitarist of Swedish garage rock band The Hives almost exclusively plays Telecasters, switching between stock Teles, Esquires, a Telecaster Custom (with only the bridge pickup wired) and a center-block (similar to a Gibson Firebird) Telecaster-style custom guitar.
- Syd Barrett (1946–2006), guitarist/singer/songwriter of the band Pink Floyd; used a unique mirror-disk covered Esquire and a 1960s-era Custom Tele.
- Phil Baugh (1936–1990), a hot country guitarist whose song "Country Guitar" with Verne Stovall, recorded on his Telecaster, was a hit in 1964 and earned him numerous awards. He worked as a popular session guitarist in Nashville from 1975 until his death in 1990.
- Jeff Beck (1944–2023) Emerging in the mid 1960s with the Yardbirds, Beck proved that a ragged Fender Esquire could moan like a fuzzed-out violin. His lines in “Heart Full of Soul” and “Evil Hearted You” defined psychedelic guitar.
- Matt Bellamy (born 1978), frontman, lead singer, pianist and guitarist of Devon-based band Muse, as well as bassist for British-Australian supergroup The Jaded Hearts Club, mostly plays Telecasters in his songs, concerts and tours. From 2000–2009 most of them were custom designed by Devon-based Guitar designer Hugh Manson, after which the job was taken up by the head luthier at Manson Design Works. Bellamy also bought a stock in the workshop and became its owner in 2019, though Bellamy has also used Fender Telecasters. He also gave Tom Morello a custom Telecaster. In 2020, Bellamy bought Jeff Buckley's "Grace" Fender Telecaster and used it to record his EP "Cryosleep", he also used it to record a song with The Jaded Hearts Club alongside using it for Muse's 2022 album Will of the People. Both Buckley and Morello have influenced Bellamy.
- Ed Bickert (1932–2019) Canadian jazz guitarist, one of the earliest jazz musicians to use a solid body electric exclusively. Began using a Telecaster while his other guitar was in the repair shop, and transitioned to Telecaster use for the remainder of his career.
- Frank Black (born 1965) of the Pixies is a long-time Telecaster player.
- Ritchie Blackmore (born 1945) of Deep Purple, Rainbow and Blackmore's Night. Blackmore regularly used a Fender Stratocaster, but in live footage of Ritchie Blackmore's Rainbow on the "Shadow of the Moon" tour in 1997 as well as various tours with Blackmore's Night onwards, Blackmore plays a Black Single Pickup Custom Jazz Telecaster.
- Mike Bloomfield (1943–1981) played a Telecaster on the first album by the Paul Butterfield Blues Band, considered a groundbreaking example of post-Chicago electric blues. He employed the same instrument on Bob Dylan's hit single "Like a Rolling Stone" and the album Highway 61 Revisited. Most famously, Bloomfield played his Telecaster on stage with Dylan at the 1965 Newport Folk Festival, at which Dylan "went electric" to much controversy among his fans.
- D. Boon (1958–1985) of the punk band Minutemen (band) preferred Telecasters, with very high treble and essentially no middle or bass on his amplifier settings.
- Jimmy Bryant (1925–1980), a prolific session musician, was given one of the first Broadcasters by Fender engineer George Fullerton. Fullerton compared this gift to "starting a prairie fire", and said that "pretty soon we couldn't make enough of those guitars".
- Roy Buchanan (1939–1988), a blues/rock musician whose playing inspired the likes of Jeff Beck, earning him the title "The Guitarist's Guitarist's Guitarist," was a faithful Tele man during his solo career. He played a 1953 Telecaster called Nancy.
- Jonny Buckland (born 1977), of Coldplay, frequently uses the '72 Telecaster Thinline.
- Jeff Buckley (1966–1997) used a blonde 1983 Fender USA Telecaster fitted with a mirror finish pick guard. Buckley used this guitar almost exclusively on his sole studio album Grace (1994). It featured an out of phase "glassy" sounding neck pickup. In 2020, the guitar was purchased by Matt Bellamy of Muse.
- James Burton (born 1939) has played a Telecaster since he was 13, and he has influenced many other guitarists. He was the most visible player of the Tele in the late '50s, appearing on television with Ricky Nelson almost every week on the Adventures of Ozzie & Harriet. His most famous guitar is the Paisley Red Tele, which he first used while performing with Elvis Presley. He has also played with Gram Parsons and Merle Haggard. As a long-time Tele player, he wrote a foreword to A. R. Duchossoir's book detailing the history of the guitar.
- Anna Calvi (born 1980) frequently uses a 1990s American-made Fender Telecaster guitar and a vintage red Vox AC30 amp, both live and in the studio.
- Mike Campbell (born 1950), best known for his work with Tom Petty, has stated that his 1950 Broadcaster has been one of his live mainstay guitars since the beginning of the Heartbreakers. Campbell also played an early-'70s Telecaster with two humbuckers and Bigsby vibrato tailpiece nicknamed "Big Red."
- Jim Campilongo (born 1958) is a New York roots rock guitarist from San Francisco, known for recording a series of instrumental guitar albums and being a member of The Little Willies with Norah Jones. Campilongo plays a 1959 'top loader' Telecaster. He also plays Jim Campilongo signature guitars produced by the Fender Custom Shop which were modeled on his 1959 Telecaster. Campilongo cites Telecaster player Roy Buchanan as an important influence on his guitar technique.
- Martin Carthy MBE (born May 21, 1941) is an English folk singer and guitarist who has remained one of the most influential figures in British traditional music. He played a blue Telecaster when a member of Steeleye Span, from 1970 to 1972, 1977–1978 and 1999.
- Eric Clapton although primarily associated with the Fender Stratocaster, played a Telecaster during his tenure with the Yardbirds in 1964.
- Kurt Cobain (1967-1994), guitarist/singer/songwriter of the Seattle-based grunge rock band Nirvana; played his own custom-made Telecaster named "Courtney", after his then-wife Courtney Love, regularly during the Oceania tour in January/February 1992, and the infamous gig in São Paulo on January 16th, 1993 (considered by some to be one of the band’s worst), when he broke the guitar’s neck and threw it into the audience.
- Albert Collins (1932–1993) ("The Master of the Telecaster") created his original blues sound using minor open tunings and a capo placed high up on the neck. Fender offers an Albert Collins Signature Telecaster based on his '66 model, which features a humbucker in the neck position.
- Jamie Cook (born 1985) is the guitarist of Arctic Monkeys and used the Fender Telecaster reissue from 2005 to 2008.
- Hugh Cornwell has played a Telecaster since his early days in the Stranglers, originally one equipped with a Filtertron 3rd pickup.
- Graham Coxon (born 1969), guitarist of Blur, has relied on the Telecaster for the majority of his career, achieving a distinctive sound underlined by an inventive use of effects that played an integral part in Blur's success during the 1990s. He uses a blonde 1968 Telecaster with a Gibson PAF Pickup, a 1960 Lake Placid blue Telecaster Relic, and a 1972 Telecaster Deluxe, while his time with Blur saw him use a reissue 1952 blonde Telecaster.
- Steve Cropper (1941-2025) creates rhythm work known to be spare and crisp using the bridge pickup of the Telecaster, playing with Stax session band Booker T. & the MGs, who backed such stars as Otis Redding and Sam & Dave.
- Denny Dias of Steely Dan presaged the 1970s trend for dual-humbucker Teles by replacing both of the single coils in his guitar with humbuckers and installing a Stratocaster-style bridge.
- Jerry Donahue (born 1946) of Fairport Convention released a solo album in 1986 called Telecasting and was a member of the Telecaster trio called the Hellecasters.
- Bob Dylan (born 1941) owned a black-and-white early 1960s Telecaster with a maple cap fretboard, which became one of his first electric guitars, shaping his controversial electric sound. He used this guitar on his epic 1966 tour of Australia and Europe and then Robbie Robertson adopted it for his use with the Band for their first four albums and live concerts.

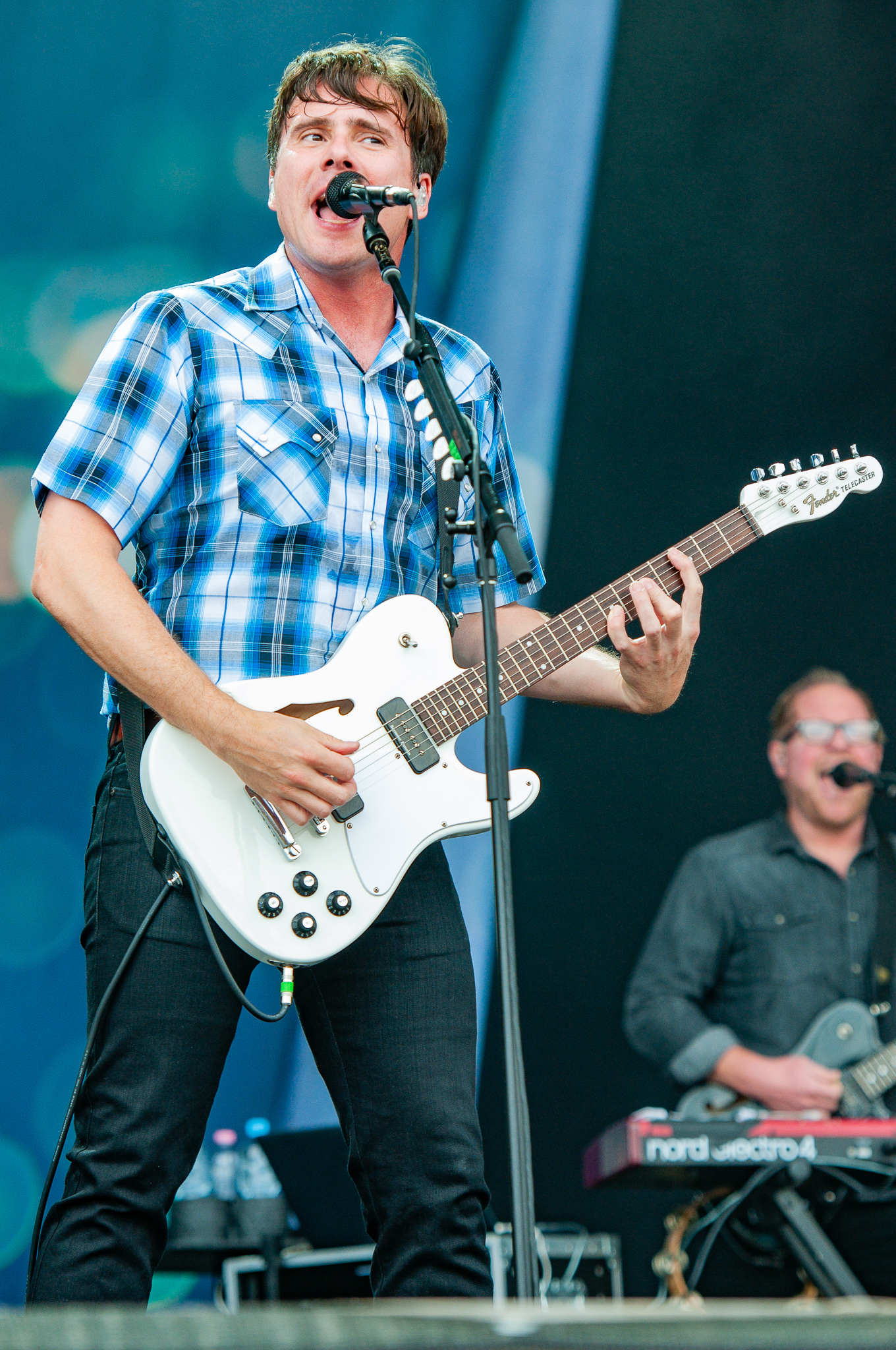
Jim Adkins's (pictured here in 2018) signature Telecaster model diverges from the standard by featuring P-90 pickups and a shorter scale length.

== F-J ==
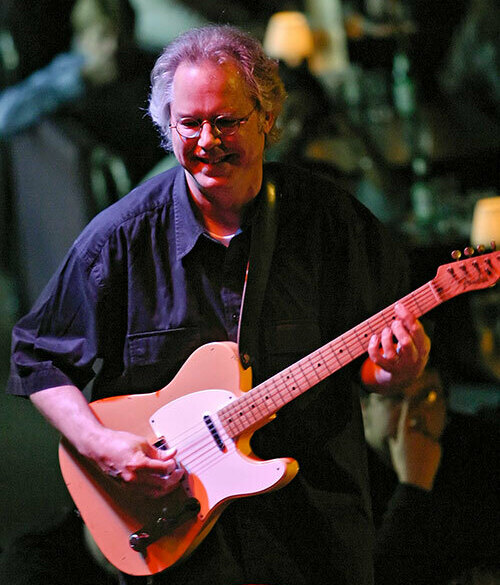
Bill Frisell

- John Flansburgh (born 1960), songwriter and guitarist for They Might Be Giants, owns and frequently uses two left-handed Telecasters in concert. However, his most iconic guitar is the Mojo Chessmaster, a lefty Telecaster with a custom body built for him by Chris Cush of the Mojo guitar shop. The Chessmaster (named by Flansburgh for its resemblance to a rook) has appeared in promotional images and music videos for the band from the early 90s up to 2018.
- Robben Ford (born 1951) has used a 1960 white Telecaster as one of his main guitars throughout his career. He has referred to it as "the best working guitar" that he has had and his "best friend over the years."
- Bill Frisell (born 1951) jazz guitarist noted for his atmospheric legato sounds, has used the Telecaster as his primary guitar since at least 2007.
- Danny Gatton (1945–1994) played a customized '53 Tele whose specifications were replicated by Fender for his Signature model, including unique angled bridge saddles for improved intonation of the classic 3-saddle bridge, and use of Joe Barden pickups.
- Billy Gibbons (born 1949), of American rock band ZZ top plays multiple custom Telecasters. He owns a John Bolin Broadcaster, T-style “Peeler” & Esquire, Palir Classic T & RebelRelic Holy Grail.
- Vince Gill (born 1957), who replaced fellow Tele-player Albert Lee in Rodney Crowell's backing band, uses a '53 Telecaster as his primary stage guitar.
- David Gilmour (born 1946) has used a Telecaster and Esquire from Fender in addition to his regularly used Fender Stratocaster. His beat-up looking Esquire was used on his 1978 self-titled solo album on backing tracks, the studio version of "Run Like Hell" from The Wall, and recently on Paul McCartney's Run Devil Run album. It was also pictured on the back of his 1984 solo album About Face. He used a Telecaster for some early recordings, and used a sunburst Telecaster for all of the guitar solos (both live and in studio) on the track "Dogs" from Pink Floyd's 1977 album Animals. He used a 1952 reissue yellow Telecaster on live performances of "Run Like Hell" on the live albums and home videos Delicate Sound of Thunder and Pulse, as well as on performances of "Astronomy Domine" (as originally written and performed by Esquire player Syd Barrett—see above) on the European leg of the tour in support of The Division Bell. A recording of the song was included on Pulse.
- Jonny Greenwood (born 1971) of Radiohead uses a Telecaster Plus.

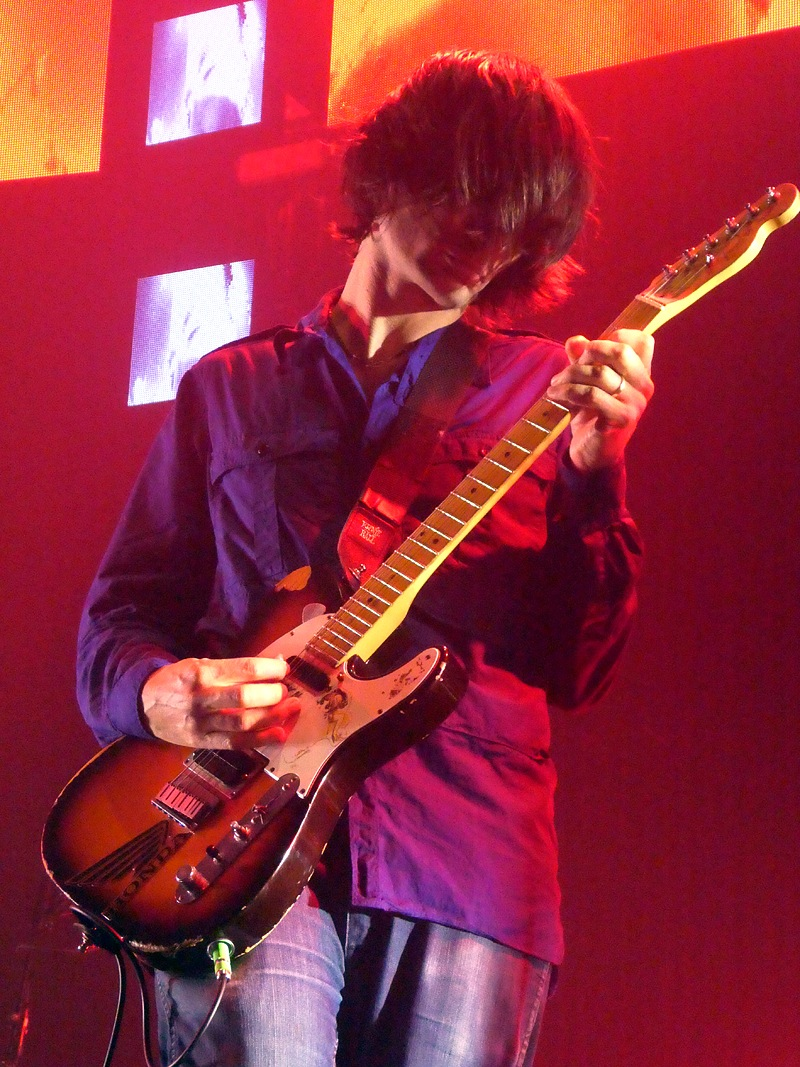
The Radiohead guitarist Jonny Greenwood playing a Telecaster Plus in 2016

- Ted Greene (1946–2005), a Southern California guitarist, helped Fender design an accurate '52 Telecaster vintage reissue (their first such reissue) by referencing his extensive collection of old Telecasters, Broadcasters and Nocasters.
- Merle Haggard (1937–2016) – revolutionized country music with his twangy Telecaster sound, along with Buck Owens and Roy Nichols.

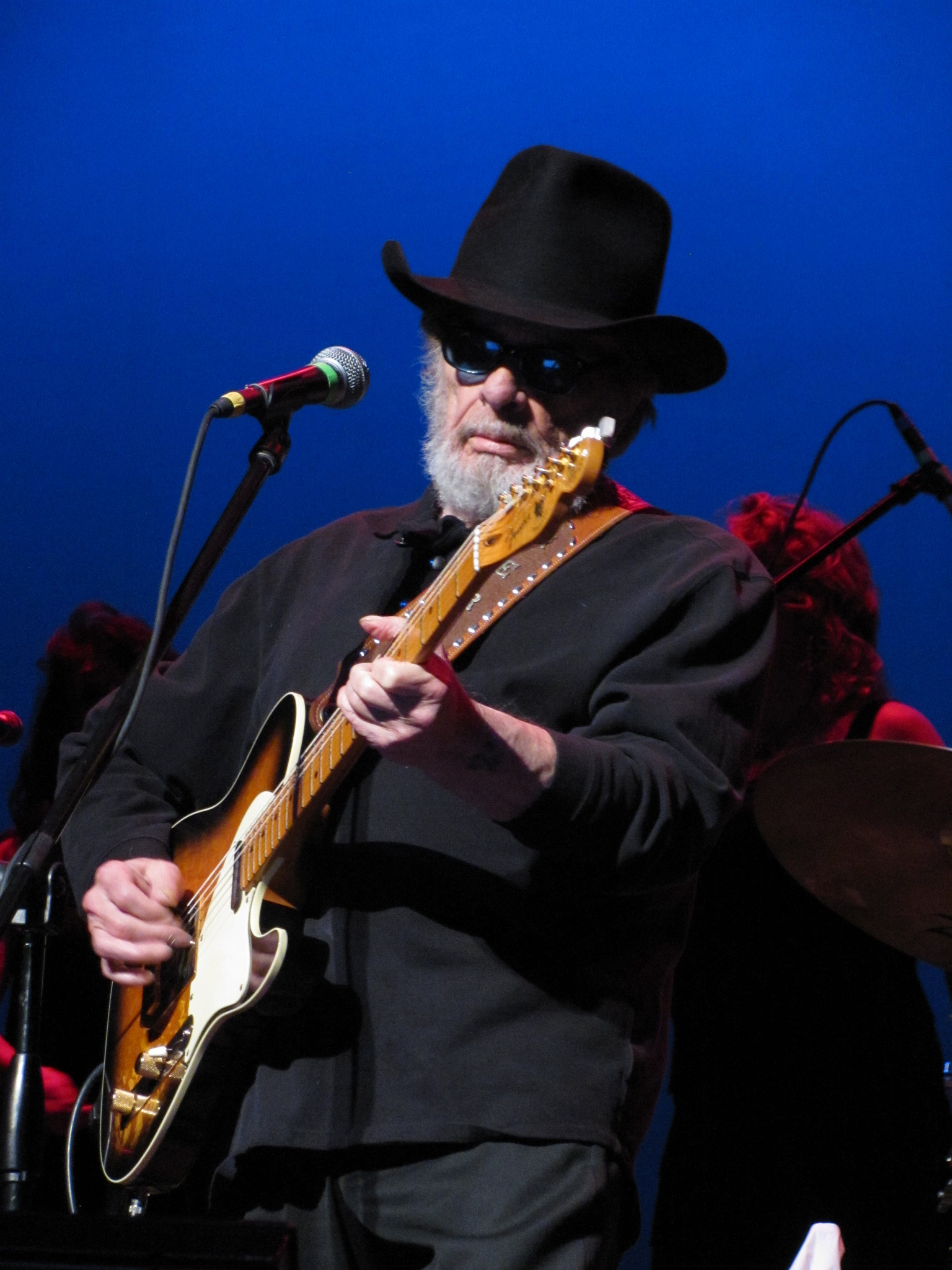
Merle Haggard in 2013

- Chrissie Hynde (born 1951) has often used her blue Telecaster with the Pretenders, and it was pictured on the jacket of their album Get Close.
- George Harrison (1943–2001) of the Beatles received a prototype Rosewood Telecaster as a planned gift from Fender in 1968, which is now the basis for a Fender George Harrison Signature Telecaster. Fender selected the better of two prototypes built, flew it to England in its own personal seat along with a courier, and hand-delivered the guitar to Apple offices in January 1969. Harrison used this guitar during the Beatles' "Get Back Sessions" as well as on the Beatles' 1970 album Let It Be and Abbey Road (1969). Of equal notability, Harrison used the rosewood Tele for the Beatles' last public performance in 1969, famously referred to as 'the Rooftop concert'. Harrison subsequently gave this instrument after just 11 months to Delaney Bramlett.
- Jimi Hendrix, who primarily used Stratocasters, allegedly used a Telecaster borrowed from bassist Noel Redding for the solo on "Purple Haze".
- James Hetfield (born 1963) of American metal band Metallica used a Telecaster for the song "Unforgiven II".
- Noddy Holder (born 1946) of British glam rock outfit Slade used an all-black Fender Telecaster as one of his main guitars during the height of the band's success during the early 1970s, and can be seen playing the guitar on both live and televised performances on several occasions.
- PJ Harvey (born 1969) used to play a borrowed 1967 Telecaster (from friend John Parish) during her early career. In a 1995 interview to Guitar Player, she declared: "John's Telecaster is closer to my heart. It's on all my records — I used to nick it all the time." Later, in 2000, when she received the Mercury Music Prize, she bought her own 1960s Telecaster.
- Robyn Hitchcock (born 1953) has used a Telecaster since 1979 for his distinctive English electric psychedelic sound, and said that it "... chose itself for me as my favourite electric guitar, because so many of my favourite guitar riffs were played on it."
- Steve Howe (born 1947) has used a 1955 Telecaster, customized with a different toggle switch and a humbucker in the neck position for the first time in the entire 1974 Yes album "Relayer", and after that frequently uses his Telecaster in various live performances and in several studio recordings.
- Frank Iero (born 1981), rhythm guitarist of American alternative rock band, My Chemical Romance played a Telecaster on the My Chemical Romance Reunion Tour.
- Waylon Jennings (1937–2002), country music icon, preferred Telecasters and had five customized models.

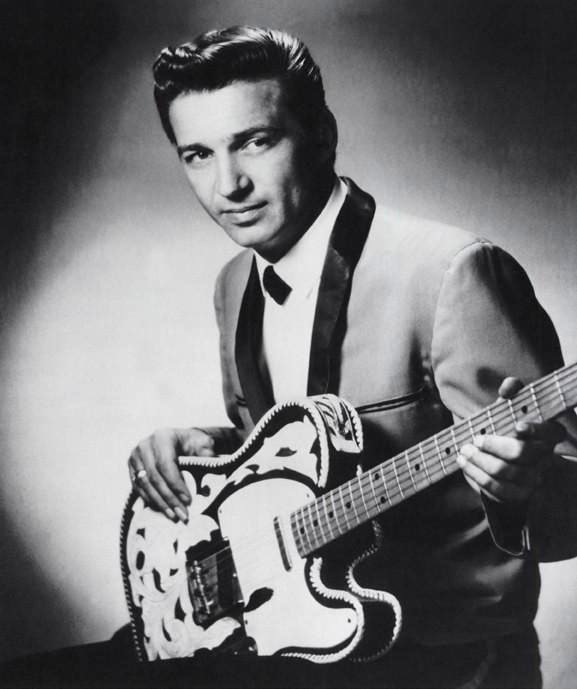
Waylon Jennings in 1965

- John 5 (born 1971) is a heavy metal and country guitarist. Fender now produces a J5 Signature Telecaster which John 5 co-designed.
- Wilko Johnson (1947–2022), a British R&B and Pub Rock legend, exponent of 'machine gun' rhythm/lead style that has inspired punk and speed metal players alike. He has played the same black tele with red pickguard for years as founder member of Dr Feelgood and subsequently with Ian Dury's Blockheads as well as his own bands. "The punk guitarist's punk guitarist was Wilko Johnson of Dr Feelgood"

== K-P ==
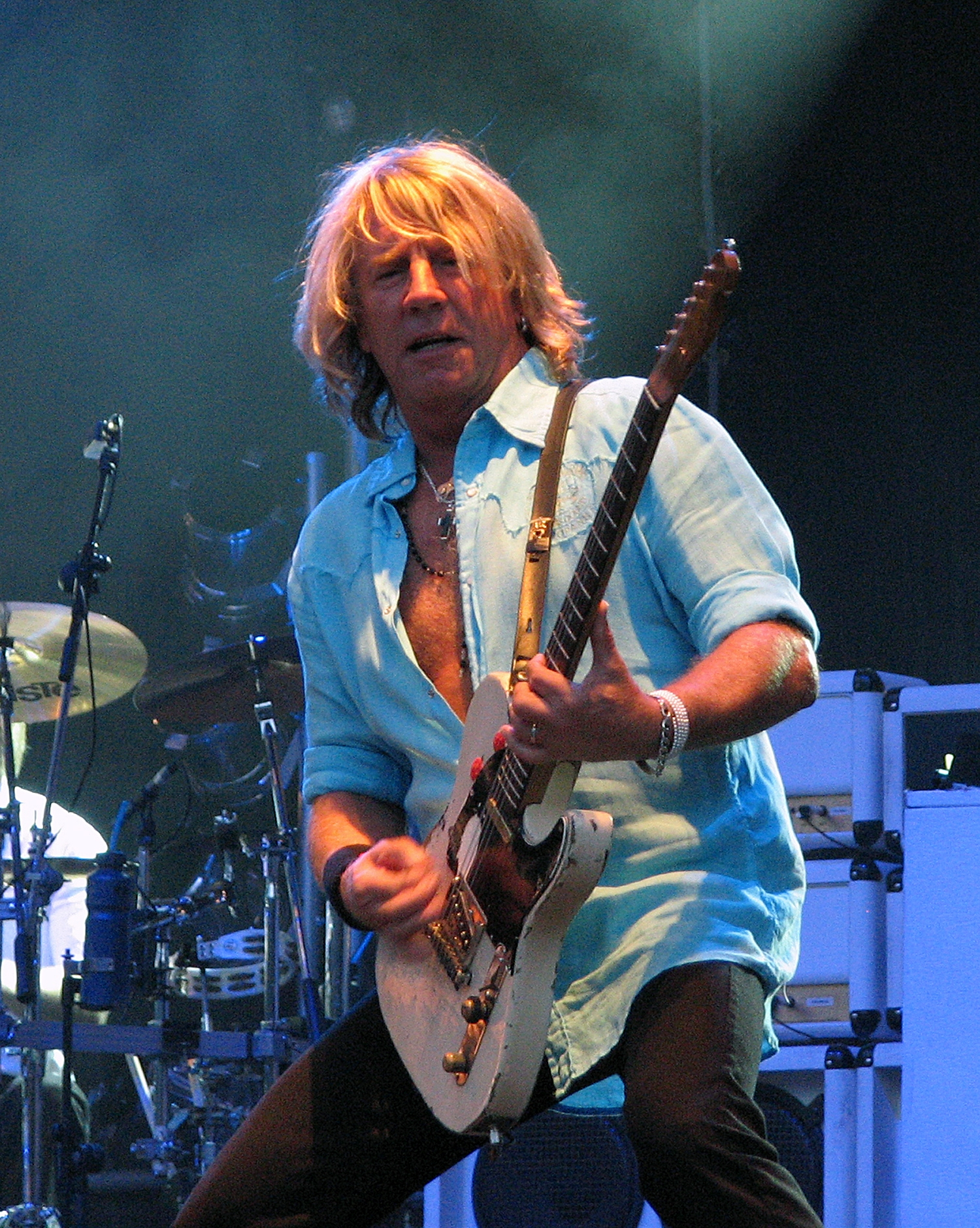
Rick Parfitt playing his trademark white Telecaster

- Bill Kirchen (born 1947), longtime Telecaster devotee who played in Commander Cody and the Lost Planet Airmen during the 1970s and continues to drive his well-abused Tele to the limits of the rockabilly sound. Known for his barnstorming live licks and stylisitic diversity, Kirchen's first Telecaster came to him in a 1967 even trade with a stranger he met on bus, Kirchen exchanging his own Gibson SG in the deal

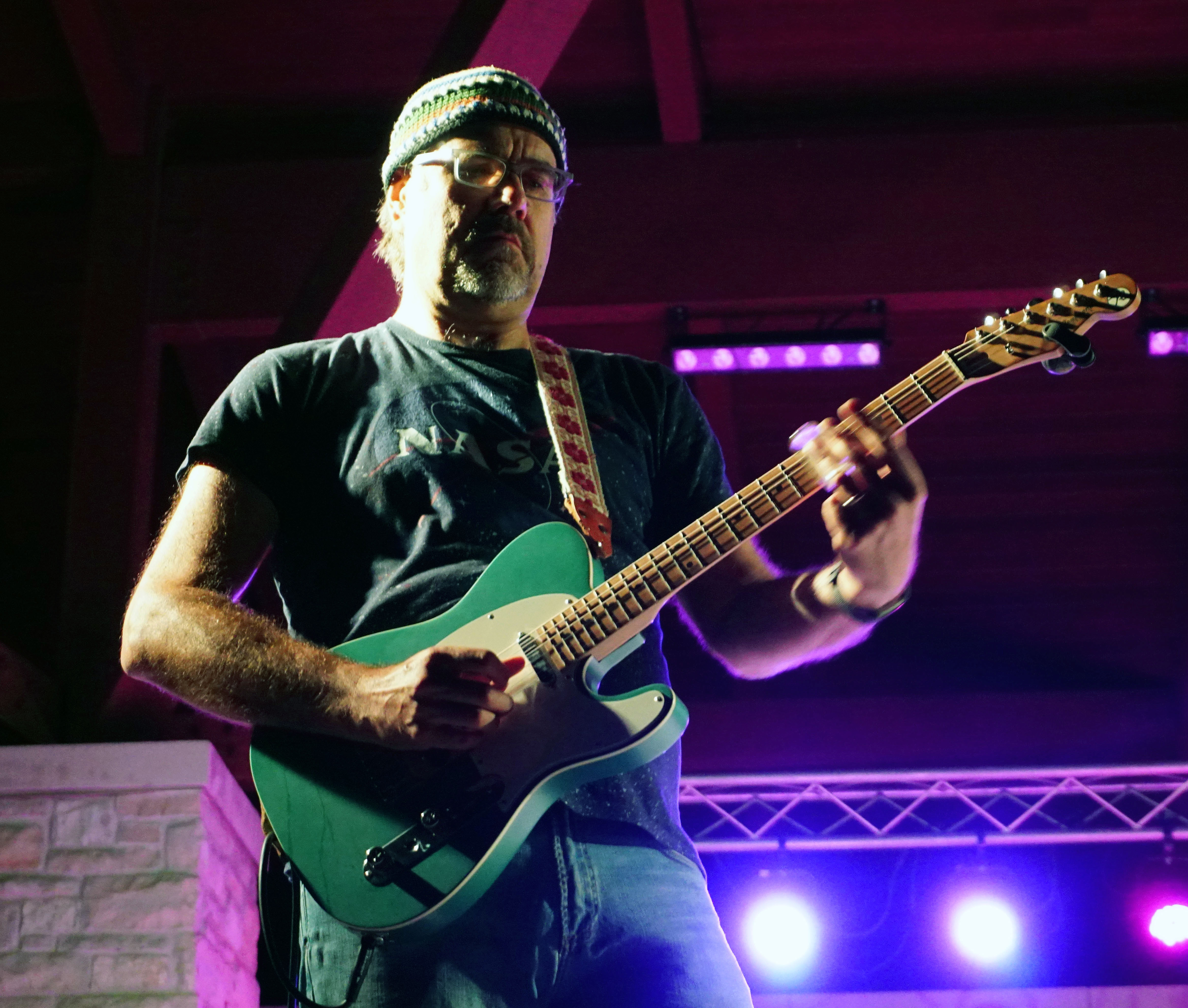
Greg Koch playing one of his Fender Telecasters in 2018

- Albert Lee (born 1943), whose instrumental work has influenced many other guitarists, has played a Telecaster since 1963. As a long-time Tele player, he wrote a foreword to A. R. Duchossoir's book detailing the history of the guitar.
- Alex Lifeson (born 1953), the guitarist of Rush, frequently uses the Telecaster in live performances and in studio recordings.
- Avril Lavigne (born 1984), Canadian singer, has a signature model Telecaster.
- Brent Mason (born 1959), a prolific Nashville session musician. Fender produces a Brent Mason Signature guitar, which is modeled after Mason's heavily customized 1968 Telecaster. It features 2 "stacked" pick-ups (bridge and middle) and one mini humbucker (neck position), and an additional volume control to "bleed in" the middle pick-up.
- Cate Le Bon (born 1983), Welsh musician and producer, plays a Telecaster that her father gave her when she was 14.
- Greg Koch has played a Telecaster for his entire career. He plays a 1953 Fender Telecaster and many other more recent Telecaster models, but has more recently moved to Reverend Guitars. With Reverend, he also plays Telecaster styled guitars, with his signature Gristlemaster pickups.
- Johnny Marr (born 1963), famously used a Telecaster on the Smiths' hit "This Charming Man” (Often mistaken for a Rickenbacker 330).
- J Mascis (born 1965), of Dinosaur Jr., has a signature model Telecaster, even though he is more often associated with the Jazzmaster, of which he previously had signature models with Fender and Squier. The signature Telecaster is a recreation of Mascis' 1958 model with a blue flake finish, mirrored pickguard, and top-loader bridge; while mostly used for lead work in the studio, this model was seen during Dinosaur Jr.'s 1994 appearance on the Late Show with David Letterman.
- Paul McCartney (born 1942) used a Fender Esquire for some guitar work with the Beatles, namely on "Good Morning, Good Morning" for the Beatles' album Sgt. Pepper's Lonely Hearts Club Band, and on "Helter Skelter" for The Beatles double album. In 2020, McCartney received a 1954 Fender Telecaster, a gift from his wife, which he used on McCartney III.
- Richie Kotzen (born 1970) has a signature model Telecaster (TLR-155RK) made by Fender Japan. The guitar features an ash/brown sunburst body with laminated flame maple caps, maple neck and one piece maple fretboard with abalone dot inlays and 22 super jumbo frets. The Telecaster model features a DiMarzio Chopper T pickup in the bridge position (single spaced humbucker) and a DiMarzio Twang King in the neck position. The Stratocaster is fitted with three custom made DiMarzio DP173 Twang King single coil pickups.
- Julian Lage (/lɑːʒ/ LAHZH; born December 25, 1987) is an American guitarist and composer. For Lage, his own passion for the guitar – and the Telecaster specifically – stems from his childhood and these experiences he shared with his father.
- Terry Manning, well known music producer and recording/live artist, has used Telecasters since early 1963.
- Brad Paisley (born 1972) plays guitars from an extensive collection of Telecasters and Tele-inspired models, including his "warhorse," a '68 Red Paisley model (the same model that James Burton made famous) named "Old Pink." One notable feature on some of his guitars is a G-bender device. Paisley has custom Tele-inspired models made by Crook Custom Guitars. In 2017, Fender released the Brad Paisley Signature Telecaster in a silver sparkle roadworn finish, which was built using a paulownia wood core that is surrounded by a spruce top.
- Buck Owens (1929–2006), along with Don Rich and their custom sparkle-finish Telecasters, helped create the distinctive Bakersfield sound of country music in the early 1960s. Owens' personal Telecaster was gold with a red, white, and blue pickguard, reminiscent of his famous American Flag style Acoustic guitar.
- Jimmy Page (born 1944), though more known for his use of the Gibson Les Paul, used a Telecaster in his earlier work with the Yardbirds and on Led Zeppelin's first album, as well as on Stairway to Heaven, one of Led Zeppelin's most famous tracks. Page later used the Telecaster in recording and touring for his solo album Outrider.
- Rick Parfitt (1948–2016), used white Telecasters throughout his career with Status Quo.
- Luther Perkins (1928–1968), a member of Johnny Cash's backing band the Tennessee Two/Three used his Esquire to create the "boom-chicka" rhythms that came to characterize much of Cash's music.
- Mark Knopfler (1949), founder of Dire Staits plays a few Telecasters. He uses an original 1954 and copies from Schecter and Pensa
- Mike Oldfield (born 1953), aged 16, got a 66 blonde Telecaster which used to belong to Marc Bolan. He performed all the guitar parts of his breakthrough album Tubular Bells with this guitar, and most parts of his next albums.
- Roy Nichols (1932–2001) was a guitarist in Merle Haggard's group the Strangers, and famously used the "chicken pickin'" technique for which the Telecaster is so well suited. Fittingly, an image of a Telecaster is engraved on his tombstone.
- Tom Morello (born 1964), with his 1982 Fender Telecaster “Sendero Luminoso”. Used to record most of drop D Rage Against the Machine songs like Killing in the Name.
- Tony Perry (b. 1986) of Pierce The Veil, owns multiple neon-finished Jim Root Telecasters.
- Brian May (b. 1947) of Queen, famously played a black coloured Fender Telecaster on the 1979 hit, "Crazy Little Thing Called Love", and on their 1982 album "Hot Space".

== Q-Z ==
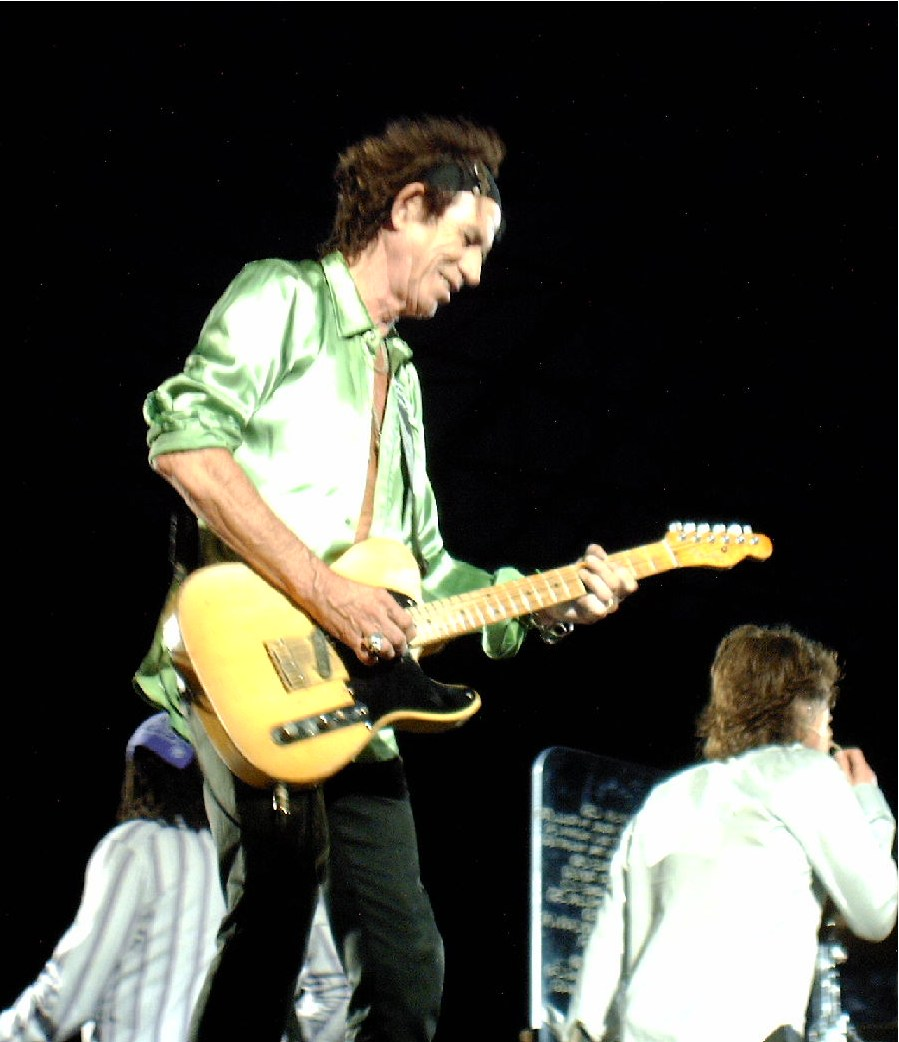
Keith Richards

- Will Ray (born 1950) has been part of the Telecaster trio the Hellecasters from 1993-on. He is known for extensive use of the B-Bender and finger-mount slide on his Telecaster. In recognition of the Hellecasters' contributions to the Telecaster, Fender has produced more signature models for the group than for any other group, including two Will Ray signature models: the Jazz-a-Caster and the Mojo-Tele.
- Keith Richards (born 1943) has composed many classic riffs with the Rolling Stones using a variety of Telecasters. His main guitar is a '53 Tele named Micawber, which features a 5-string open G tuning and a humbucker in the neck position.
- Robbie Robertson (1943–2023) of the Band, used a Telecaster from 1958 to 1974. His Telecaster can be heard on many of the Band's recordings.
- Arlen Roth (born 1952) has been a respected artist ever since his first solo album won the Montreaux Critics’ Award for Best Instrumental Album of the Year in 1978. He was Guitar Player Magazine's top columnist from 1982 to 1992. He has performed with such diverse artists as John Prine, Rick Wakeman, and Paul Simon. He is a Telecaster enthusiast, and has written the book Masters of the Telecaster, which details the licks of many famous Tele players.
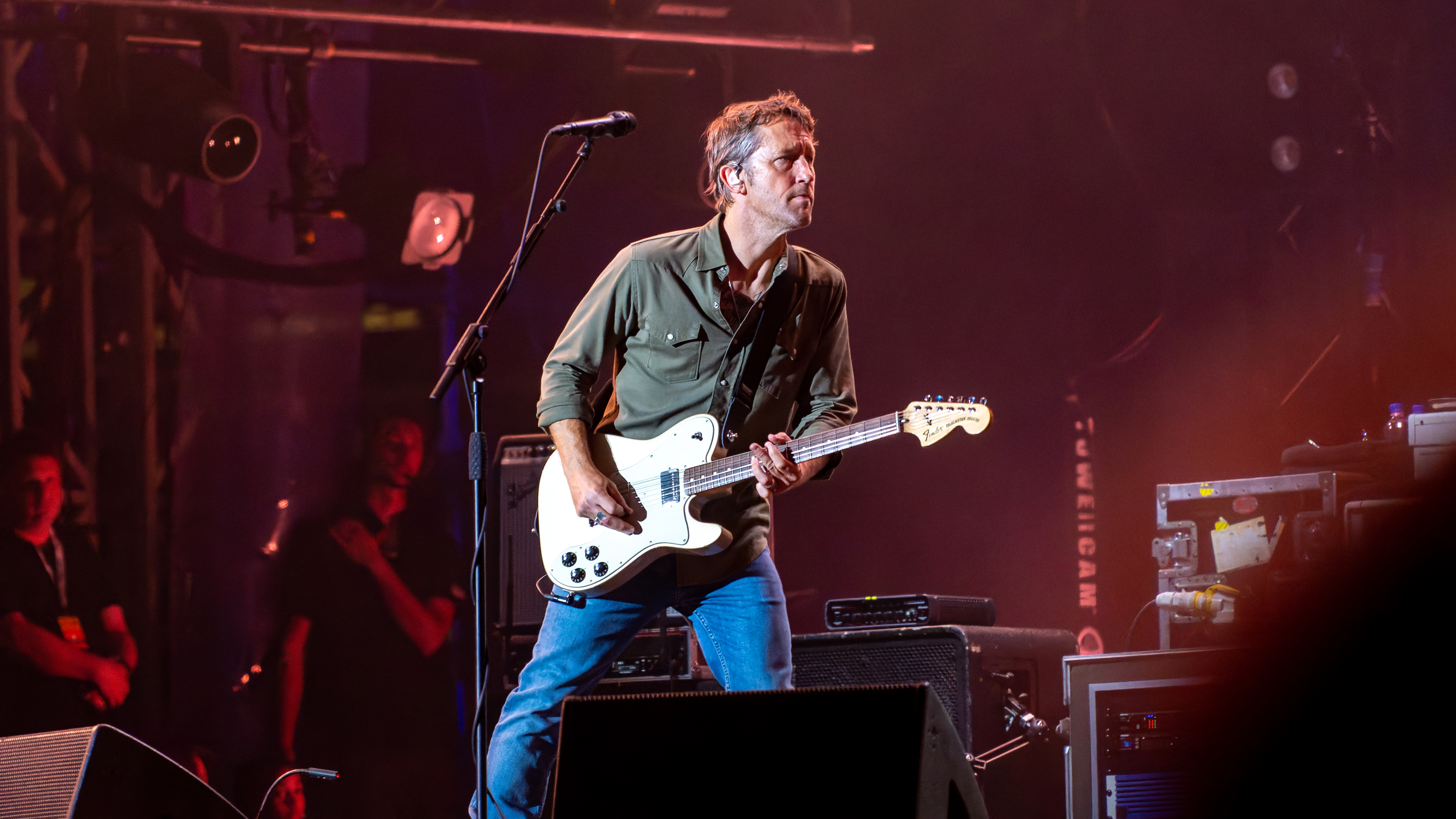
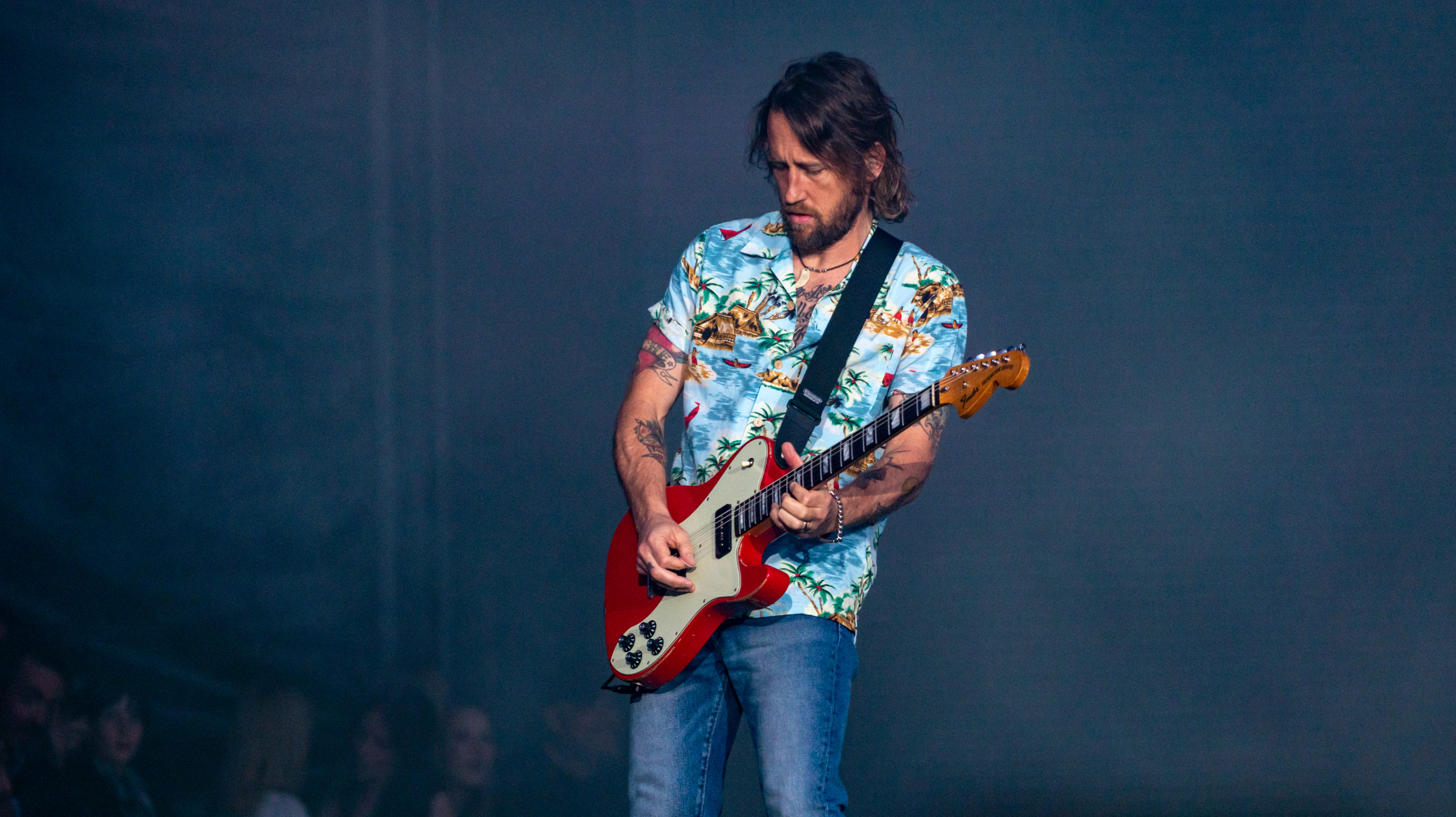
Chris Shiflett has designed two, Telecaster Deluxe-based signature models
Above: The 2012 Chris Shiflett Signature, equipped with PAF pickups (pictured in 2022)
Below: The later, P-90 equipped "Cleaver" model (pictured in 2019).
- Jeff Russell of Signals Midwest (born 1986) played a black '72 deluxe reissue during the 2014 Emo Revival.
- Don Rich (1942–1974) made the bassy rhythms and "chicken pickin'" of his custom sparkle-finish Telecaster an indispensable part of the Bakersfield sound while playing with Buck Owens & the Buckaroos.
- Jim Root (born 1971) of Slipknot, Stone Sour, now plays Fender Telecasters, Stratocasters and Jazzmasters, after trying other brands like Charvel
- Francis Rossi (born 1949) of Status Quo, "one of Britain's longest-lived bands," is a faithful Tele player.
- Chris Shiflett (born 1972) uses Telecasters in both the rock world - as lead guitarist of Foo Fighters - as well as in his country music-oriented solo career. For his work on the former Shiflett has two personally designed signature models in collaboration with Fender: The Mexican-made "workhorse" Chris Shiflett Telecaster Deluxe (released in 2012) which sports "PAF"-style custom pickups followed by the American-built 'Cleaver' model with 'noiseless' P-90 pickups in 2024.
- G.E. Smith (born 1952) has signature model Telecaster.
- Billy Squier (born 1950) used a 1960 Telecaster Custom on several tracks on his breakthrough 1981 album "Don't Say No". The guitar appears on the cover of that album.'.
- Bruce Springsteen (born 1949) has long played a 1952 Esquire upgraded with a Telecaster neck pickup. The guitar appears on the cover of his 1975 album Born to Run.
- Joe Strummer (1952–2002) of the Clash was "the most visible Tele player" in late 1970s punk, using his famous stickered instrument throughout his career, up until his death. His black Tele was a 1966 Sunburst that he painted when he started to play with the Clash, he also used a White Fender Esquire in the late 70s
- Marty Stuart (born 1958) has been a career-long devotee of the guitar. The Fender Custom Shop makes a Limited Edition Marty Stuart Tribute Telecaster which blends features from his favorite historical guitars, as played by Buck Owens, Don Rich, Mick Ronson and Clarence White. Stuart is also the owner of the original Parsons/White prototype B-bender Telecaster originally owned by Clarence White and given to Stuart by the White family. Stuart also owns Don Rich's silver metal-flake Telecaster that was given to him by Buck Owens.
- Mike Stern (born 1953) is one of the few Tele-playing jazz musicians, played guitar with Miles Davis in the early 1980s before going solo. Stern's first Telecaster, which he purchased from Danny Gatton in 1975, had originally belonged to Roy Buchanan. This guitar was stolen, and was replaced by a custom-built Telecaster-style instrument by Michael Aronson. Yamaha subsequently introduced the Pacifica 1511 Mike Stern signature model in 1996, a Telecaster-style instrument based on the Aronson guitar.
- Andy Summers (born 1942) of the Police almost always used his '61/'63 Telecaster Custom, which was customized with a Gibson neck humbucker, a preamp and a phase switch. Fender now make the Andy Summers Tribute Telecaster.
- Tommy Tedesco (1930–1997), veteran L.A. session guitarist, used a white Telecaster as his workhorse electric guitar for most of his career.
- Pete Townshend (born 1945) was famous for smashing several different makes of guitars in the 1960s with the Who, including Telecasters. In 1979, he began using Schecter Telecasters as his regular onstage instrument.
- Joe Trohman (born 1984), guitarist of Fall Out Boy and the Damned Things, has a signature telecaster made by Squier that he regularly uses in the studio and on stage.
- Redd Volkaert (born 1958) was a successor to Roy Nichols in Merle Haggard's backing band, and is "among the country’s top Telecaster guitar slingers."
- Keith Urban (born 1967) regularly plays Telecasters, one of which features decorative binding and three pickups.
- Joe Walsh (born 1947) of the Eagles has played a Red Sunburst Telecaster in the Hotel California tour and the band's 1998 induction to the Rock and Roll Hall of Fame.
- Muddy Waters (1913–1983) helped build a bridge between the blues and rock with his "walls of electrified sound," played on his red '57 Telecaster. Until 2010, Fender sold a Muddy Waters Telecaster, one of the guitars in its Signature series.
- Jim Weider (born 1951) became the guitarist for The Band in 1983 following Robbie Robertson’s departure, was a regular fixture at Levon Helm’s “Midnight Ramble” sessions, and more recently has performed with The Weight Band. Weider plays a variety of Telecasters, including a ‘52 with a ‘Big T’ rhythm pickup.
- Deryck Whibley (born 1980) of Canadian pop punk band Sum 41 has his own signature Telecaster Deluxe model with a single humbucker at the bridge and adorned with a red X for luck.
- Clarence White (1944–1973) of the Byrds, along with drummer Gene Parsons, invented the B-Bender device for the Tele for emulating pedal steel guitar effects.
- Steven Wilson (born 1967) of the Porcupine Tree played Telecaster on Closure/Continuation.
- Wowaka (1987-2019) of Hitorie used a Psychederhythm Standard-T in Blond, he is known for producing the most iconic Vocaloid songs, and when the tribute concert for his passing took place, the members of hitorie left his iconic Telecaster guitar in the place where he used to stand to sing.
