= Don Randall =

Don Randall may refer to:

- Don Randall (Fender) (1917–2008), manager at Fender Musical Instruments Corporation
- Don Randall (politician) (1953–2015), Australian politician
