= Fender Esquire =

Solid-body electric guitar manufactured by Fender

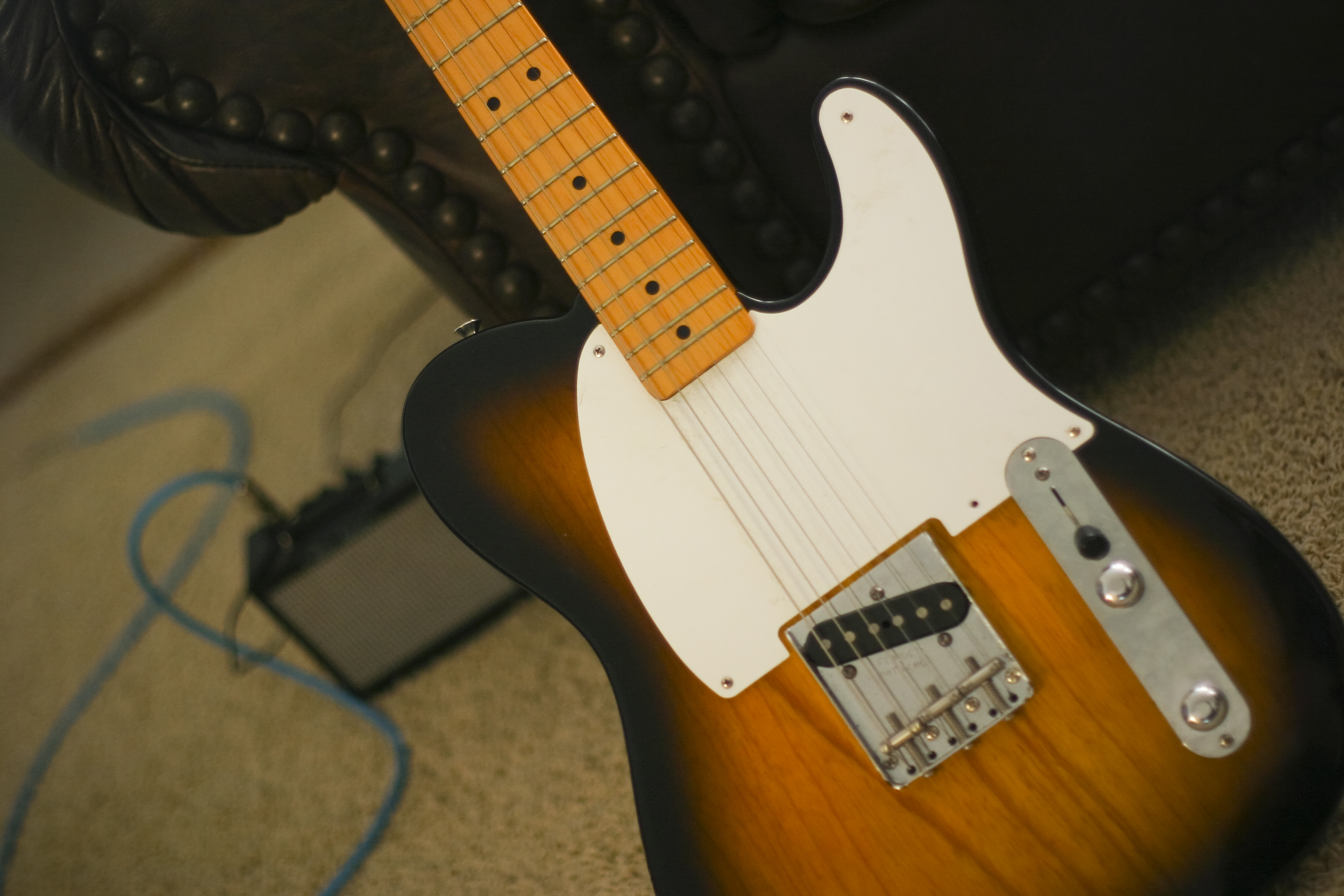
- Esquire in two-tone sunburst
- Manufacturer: Fender
- Period: 1949 (prototype); 1950 (original run); 1951–1969 (second run), with reproductions available later

Construction
- Body type: Solid
- Neck joint: Bolt-on
- Scale: 25.5"

Woods
- Body: Swamp ash, pine
- Neck: Maple
- Fretboard: Maple, rosewood

Hardware
- Bridge: Proprietary three-saddle string-through
- Pickup(s): Traditionally 1 single-coil (some 1950 examples were equipped with 2 pickups); other configurations available

Colors available
- white, black & shades of blonde Various sunbursts

The Fender Esquire is a solid-body electric guitar manufactured by the Fender Musical Instruments Corporation of Los Angeles. It was the first solid-bodied guitar marketed by the company, and made its debut in 1950.

== Early development ==
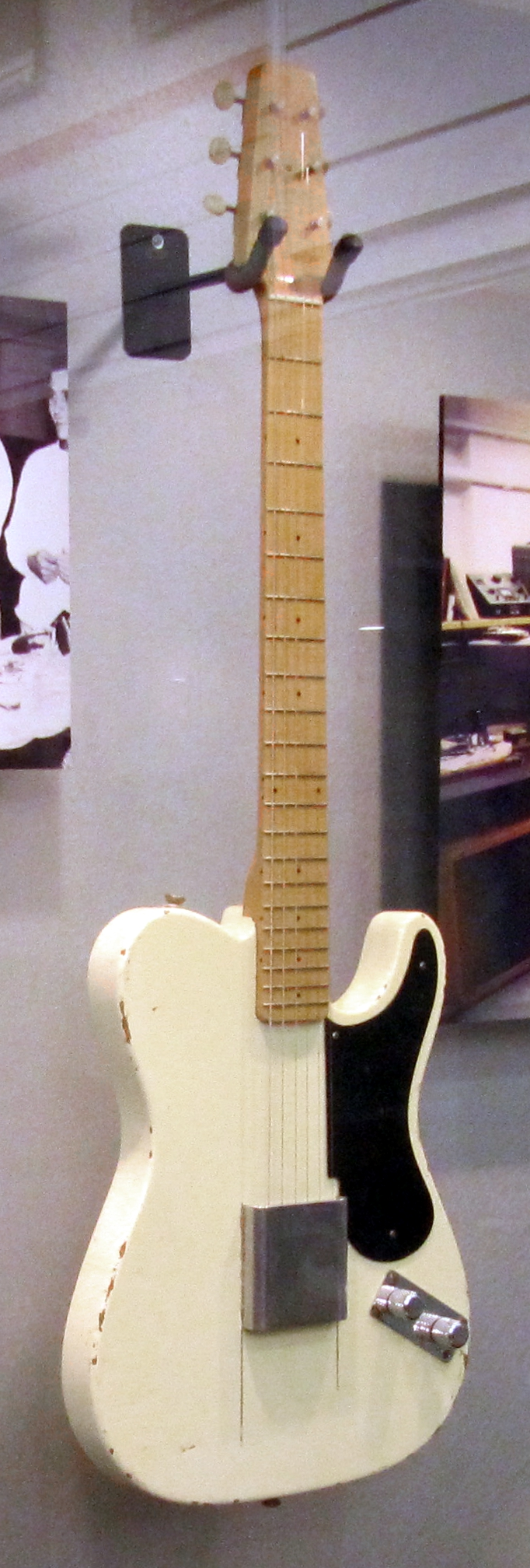
1st prototype of 1949 (replica).

=== Prototypes ===
The first prototype for the Esquire (and the later Telecaster) was completed by Leo Fender and George Fullerton in 1949. The guitar was designed to be an electronic instrument, with no acoustic manipulation of the tone. It introduced the square edged dreadnought shape, with a cutaway on the body next to the neck to allow access to the upper frets. It featured a combination bridge and pickup assembly, which used the pickup from Fender's "Champion" lap steel guitar, with individual pole pieces for each string mounted at a slant, and three bridge saddles, which allowed adjustment of individual string height, but adjustment of intonation only in pairs.

The neck, on the first Esquires manufactured in 1950, was made from a single piece of maple, without a separate fret board or truss rod. It was attached to the body with four screws and an anchor plate, unlike traditional guitar construction, in which a tenon on the neck is glued into a slot on the body. The first neck was wider at the nut, and the head had three tuners on each side. The prototype also differed from later production guitars in that the body was made of pinewood; it was painted opaque white; its pickguard did not extend below the strings; it lacked a selector switch; and the volume and tone knobs were mounted on a oblique plate. Like the production models, it had a removable pickup cover, but with straight sides. The prototype had only one pickup, as did Esquires manufactured from 1951 onwards.

In the winter of 1949/50, Fender refined the design. The neck width at the nut was narrowed to 1 5/8" and, inspired by a Croatian design, the head was modified to allow all six tuners to be installed on one edge. A tone selector switch was added, the controls were mounted on a plate parallel to the strings, and the scratch plate (pickguard) was made bigger. In late spring of 1950, Fender added a second (Champion steel) pickup in the neck position, which was redesigned with a smaller pickup to allow easier picking, and encased in a metal shielding cover designed by Karl Olmstead. This feature did not appear on Fender's commercially advertised instrument, as the distributor, the Radio & Television Equipment Company (RTEC), preferred to sell the single pickup version.

== The 1950 Esquire ==
The single pickup version of the guitar was first manufactured in March 1950, and made its commercial debut as the Esquire in Don Randall's RTEC Spring catalogue of that year. The guitar pictured in the catalog was painted black with a white pickguard, but later Esquires were painted with semi-transparent, blonde acetate lacquer, which over the years faded to a "butterscotch" blonde, and the pickguard was black. Unlike the laminated 1.5 inch thick, pine and ash wood samples, the Broadcaster was 1.75 inches thick and made of solid ash.

The dual pickup version was first manufactured in May and June 1950. Neither of the early Esquire versions had a truss rod. Fullerton’s father, Fred Fullerton, developed the truss rod reinforcement system which is still in use. By October 1950, the revised, dual pickup version had acquired a truss rod and was renamed the Broadcaster. After objections were sent to Don Randall by the Gretsch company, who produced the "Broadkaster" banjo and drum kit, this name was dropped, and guitars were shipped in 1951 with the "Fender" logo decal clipped and no model name. These guitars were referred to as the "Nocaster" until the name Telecaster was adopted in August 1951, after a competition had failed to find a suitable alternative. Television was becoming popular and the name stuck. The single pickup version retained the Esquire name.

The more versatile Broadcaster/Telecaster became one of Fender's most popular models, with dozens of variations produced. After the Telecaster was introduced, the Esquire was marketed as a lower-cost version. Over the following two decades, the availability of other low-cost models saw the Esquire's sales decline and the model was discontinued in 1969.

The Esquire has since been reissued, but has remained a relatively "niche" guitar. Esquire users prefer the model's increased treble over the Telecaster. Although the Esquire was the original model, the popularity and uninterrupted production of the Telecaster means that the limited reissue Esquire models are generally regarded and billed as variants of the Telecaster.

== The Esquire from 1951 to 1969 ==
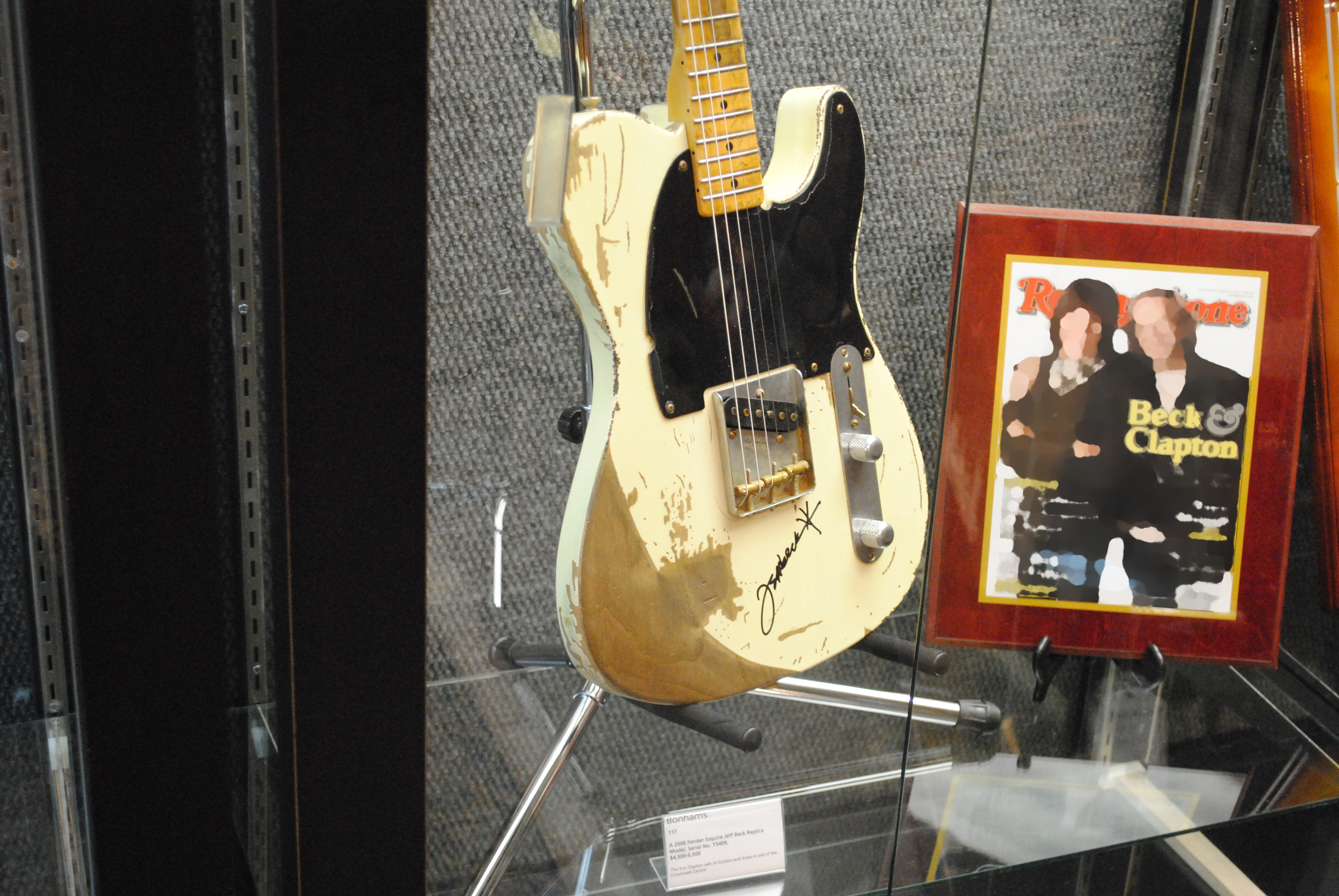
Esquire Jeff Beck replica model.

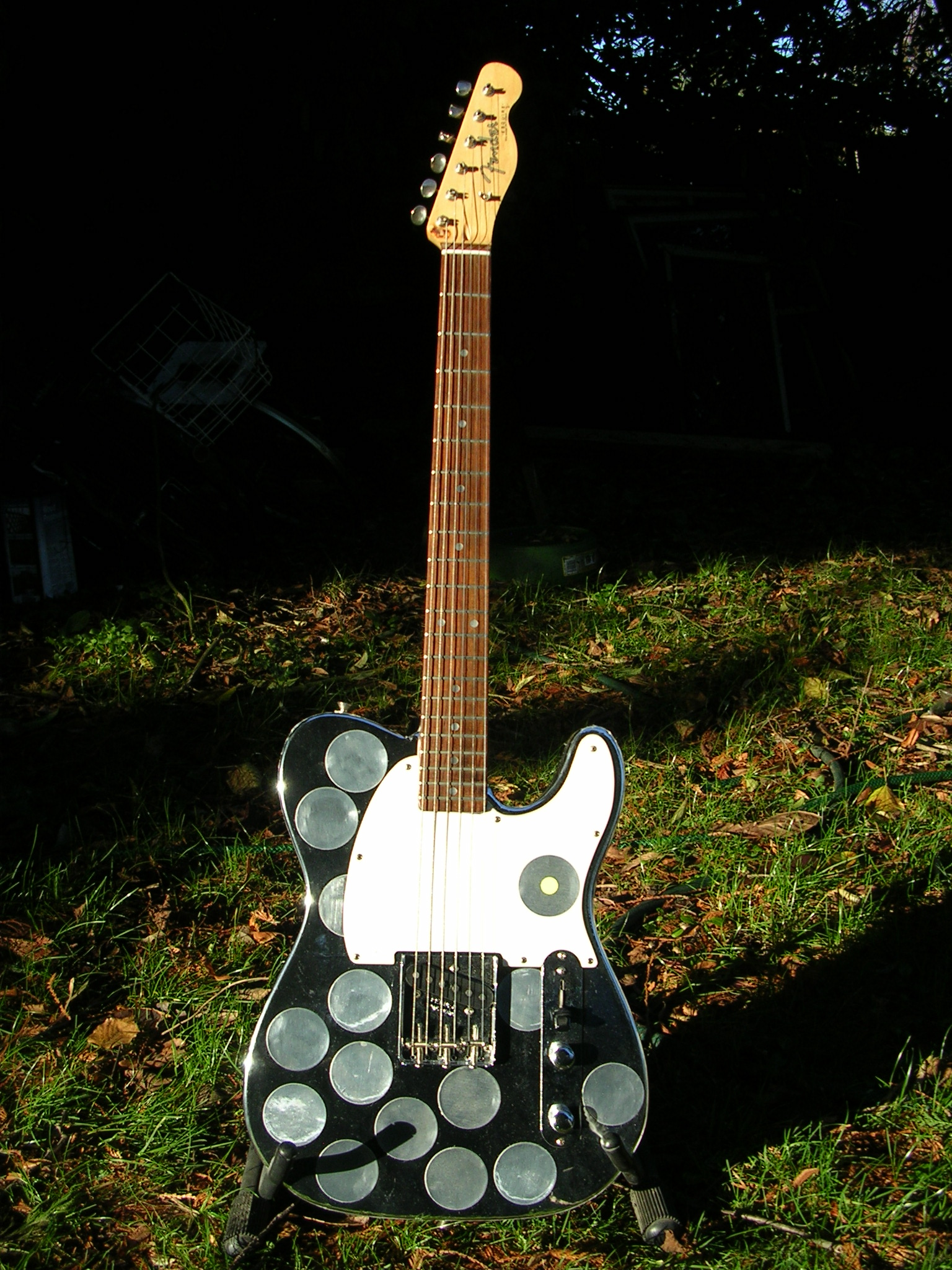
Syd Barrett's Fender Esquire.

Production and promotion of the single pickup Esquire ceased briefly after the arrival of the Telecaster. It was reintroduced in January 1951 equipped with a truss rod. The second generation Esquires resembled the Broadcasters and Telecasters of 1951, except for the "Esquire" label on the headstock and the absence of a neck pickup, and although having only one pickup, retained the three-way switch of the two-pickup guitars which allowed players to modify the pickup tone.

These Esquires, like the two-pickup version, had a routed cavity in the neck pickup position, which allowed the instrument to be upgraded to Telecaster specifications by adding another pickup and pickguard. Bruce Springsteen plays an Esquire modified in this way. He says the guitar he is pictured with on the Born to Run album cover is a hybrid consisting of a Telecaster body and Esquire neck, but it is actually a first-generation Esquire with two pickup cavities. Springsteen's guitar has a neck pickup installed, but not connected.

The Esquire was reintroduced in 1951 to provide a less expensive option than the two-pickup version, but its popularity declined as cheaper student models like the Mustang entered the market. Fender discontinued production of the Esquire in 1969.

== From 1986 to present ==
In 1986, Fender Japan began producing an Esquire model for export to the US, based on the 1954 version, under the brand name "Squier by Fender". The guitar featured threaded saddles and a white pickguard, with either butterscotch blonde or metallic red finish. There were also said to be black and sunburst versions.

The Fender Custom Shop manufactures a 1959 Esquire reproduction as part of its "Time Machine" series, which is distinguished by its top-loading bridge design. The Avril Lavigne signature Telecaster sold under the "Squier by Fender" brand resembles an Esquire in having only one pickup. Although the pickup in the Avril Lavigne Telecaster is a humbucker rather than the usual single coil, the guitar features a three-way selector switch to allow the player to isolate one coil of the pickup at a time, providing single-coil tones like the Esquire or a normal Telecaster, or both coils at the same time for a humbucker sound.

== Notable players ==
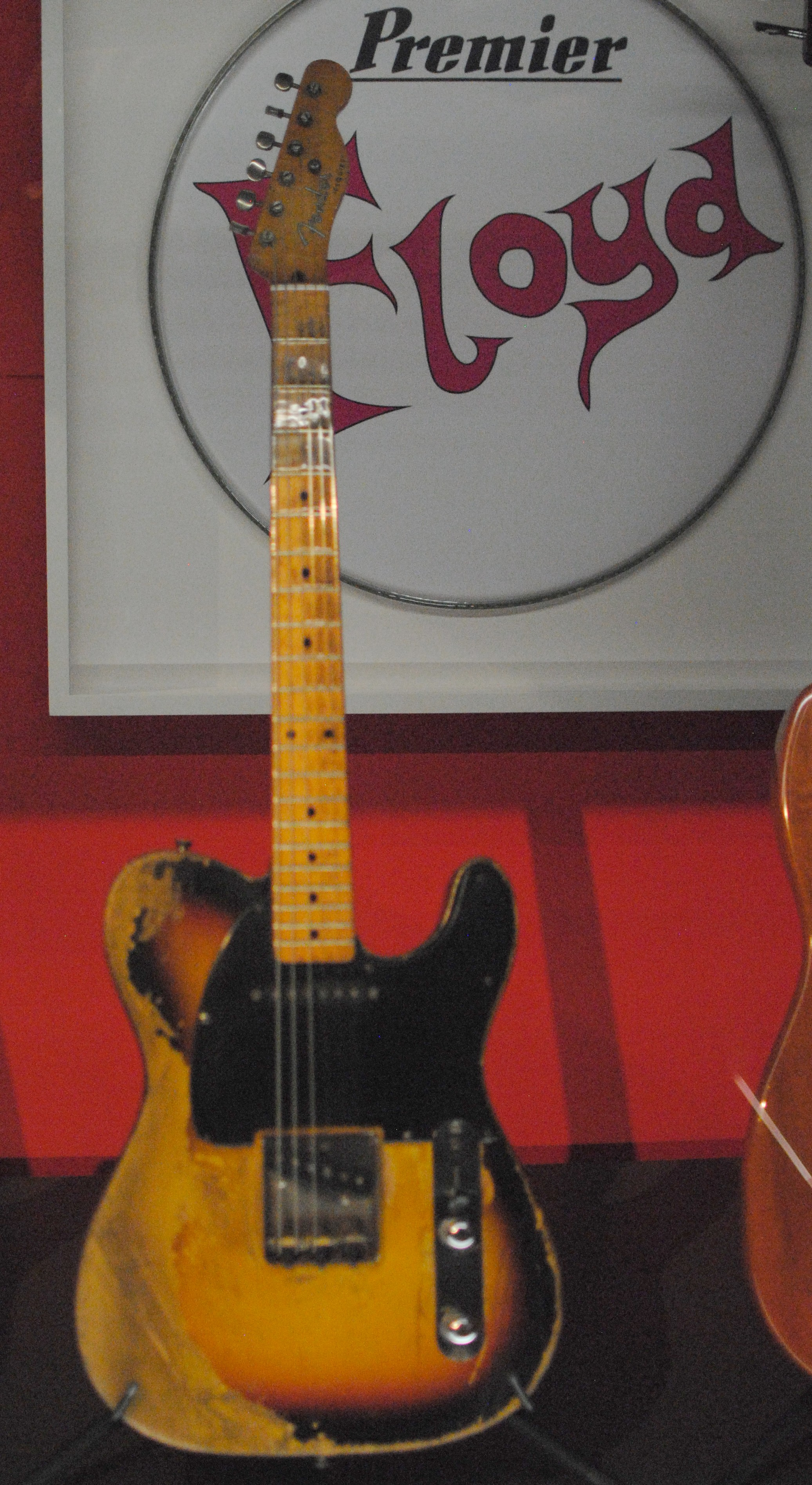
Fender Esquire guitar (1955), sold by Seymour Duncan to David Gilmour of Pink Floyd, at which point it already had a Fender Stratocaster pickup in the neck position. Seen displayed at the Pink Floyd: Their Mortal Remains exhibition.

The use of the Fender Esquire by several country musicians is popularly credited for the creation of one of the most distinctive and recognized sounds in American music history. Jimmy Wyble with Spade Cooley was the first Esquire endorser for Don Randall's advertisements. George and Leo took a new Broadcaster out to show Jimmy Bryant at the Rancho Reveler soon afterward. He first played it on the edge of the stage with an admiring crowd up close. In 1954, Luther Perkins played a slightly modified Esquire, recording the first Johnny Cash songs "Wide Open Road" and "Hey Porter". This guitar can also be heard on all records before "I Walk The Line", on which Perkins played an Esquire. Throughout his career Perkins used various Esquires. With this guitar, Perkins created the legendary "Boom Chicka Boom Sound" that identified Johnny Cash's music.

Steve Cropper with Booker T played his fifties Esquire through a Fender Harvard amplifier for tunes such as Green Onions and Dock of the Bay with Otis Redding.

Bruce Springsteen has used a 1953 Fender Esquire as his main touring and recording guitar throughout his career. He can be seen holding the guitar on the cover of his albums Born to Run (1975), Live 1975–85 (1986), Human Touch (1992), Greatest Hits (1995), and Wrecking Ball (2012). Springsteen's guitar is a combination of an Esquire neck and Telecaster body. He bought the guitar in 1971 in Belmar, New Jersey, for 185 dollars.

David Hekhouse of the Tearaways tours with a 1959 Esquire.

In 1966, Paul McCartney purchased a 1964 Fender Esquire model with a sunburst finish and rosewood fretboard. Though the guitar was a right-handed model, McCartney restrung it for left-handed playing. McCartney would use it on "Good Morning, Good Morning" for the Beatles' album Sgt. Pepper's Lonely Hearts Club Band, and on "Helter Skelter" for The Beatles double album.

Jeff Beck used a 1954 Esquire with the Yardbirds to create the famous guitar parts on "Over Under Sideways Down", "Shapes of Things", "I'm a Man," and "Heart Full of Soul". Beck bought it from the Walker Brothers guitarist John Maus while on tour with them. Maus had hand-shaved the body to be contoured like a Stratocaster. This guitar has significant wear and now belongs to pickup designer Seymour Duncan; Beck gave him the guitar as a return favor after Duncan built his famous Tele-Gib guitar for him.

Syd Barrett, the original leader of Pink Floyd, was another prominent Esquire player. His successor David Gilmour used an Esquire with an added pickup on several songs, including "Dogs," "Run Like Hell" and his work on Paul McCartney's album Run Devil Run. Gilmour also uses an Esquire on his 2015 solo album, Rattle That Lock, notably on many of the album's guitar solos.

On the single "Born to Be Wild" by Steppenwolf, guitarist Michael Monarch played an Esquire.

Roger Taylor, drummer with the rock band Queen, played a 1967 Esquire on the track "Sheer Heart Attack". Brian May played the same guitar on "Crazy Little Thing Called Love"; having been unable to find a Telecaster sound reminiscent of 1950s era-James Burton with his primary guitar the Red Special, producer Reinhold Mack suggested he "just use a Telecaster".

== See also ==
- Fender Telecaster
- List of Telecaster players (includes Esquire players)
