= Fender TC 90 =

Semi-hollowbody electric guitar

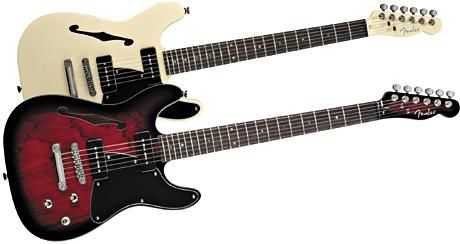
- Manufacturer: Fender
- Period: 2004–2007

Construction
- Body type: Solid-body with thinline style chamber

Woods
- Neck: Maple
- Fretboard: Rosewood

Hardware
- Bridge: Proprietary Adjustomatic
- Pickup(s): Two single-coils Seymour Duncan P-90s

Colors available
- Vintage White or Cherry

The Fender TC 90 is a semi-hollow electric guitar.

== Features ==
The Fender TC-90 electric guitar features a set neck with a double-cut body and American-made Seymour Duncan pickups. The semi-hollow ash body is set into a maple neck with a rosewood fingerboard, 22 medium-jumbo frets and abalone dots. It is also equipped with an Adjusto-Matic bridge with an anchored tailpiece. The guitar's pickup complement consists of a Seymour Duncan SP90-1NRWRP vintage P-90 (neck), a SP-90 3B Custom P90 (bridge), and 3-way switching with master tone and volume controls.

== Production history ==
The Fender TC-90 was produced in Vintage White (from 04/2004 – 10/2007) and Black Cherry Burst (from 05/2004 – 09/2007), with around 700 made of each color. In 2007 the TC-90 was revised and became the JA-90, the signature model for Jim Adkins, the singer/guitarist of Jimmy Eat World.
