= Don Randall (Fender) =

American guitar maker (1917–2008)

- Born: Donald Dean Randall; October 30, 1917; Kendrick, Idaho, United States
- Died: December 23, 2008 (aged 91)

Don Randall (October 30, 1917 – December 23, 2008) was a manager in the early years of the Fender Musical Instruments Corporation. He also came up with many product names, including the Telecaster, the Stratocaster, the Esquire, and the Champ. He was Leo Fender’s partner and the sales, distribution, marketing and advertising behind the company’s rise from small California guitar maker to worldwide status.

== Biography ==
Donald Dean Randall was born in Kendrick, Idaho, on Oct. 30, 1917, to Earnest and Osie Violet Randall. The family moved to California when Randall was 10 years old, and he developed an interest in radios and audio amplifiers while still in high school (he earned his ham radio operator license at age 16 in 1934). At the height of the Big Band era, Randall built a portable amplifier and speaker system that he set up at parties and dances. He graduated from Santa Ana Community College.

Around 1940, Randall worked part-time as a salesman for Santa Ana, California radio supply shop, Howard Taylor Wholesale Radio, calling on Southern California radio shops, including Clarence “Leo” Fender's shop in Fullerton, California, Fender Radio Service. Randall and Fender met shortly before the United States entered World War II; Randall had bought Taylor's store in 1941 but sold his inventory on being drafted into the Army.

During the war, Randall served in the Army Corps of Engineers, the Army Signal Corps and the Army Air Corps, becoming communications chief of the pre-flight school near Santa Ana Randall was a lifelong aviator who received his pilot's license in the early 1950s and logged thousands of flight hours in his own aircraft.

Randall left the Army in 1946 and re-entered the radio business, managing Francis “F.C.” Hall's Santa Ana radio shop, Radio-Tel. A salesman and an electrical engineer, Randall suggested that Hall distribute the steel guitars and amplifiers made by Leo Fender. Through Randall, Fender and Hall signed an agreement that March, marking the beginning of a long-standing partnership. Through Hall's agency, Randall handled sales and distribution of Fender products first regionally, then nationally.

Randall became president of new organization Fender Sales in February 1953 (the Fender Electric Instrument Company having become a corporation in December 1951). Under Randall's marketing genius, organizational expertise and senior partnership with Leo Fender, Fender Sales grew steadily throughout the 1950s and thrived well into the 1960s on an international scale. It was he who coined the names Esquire, Telecaster (and its earlier incarnation, the Broadcaster), Stratocaster, Precision Bass (with Leo Fender), Twin Reverb, Bassman and others.

Randall also spoke for Fender in the 1964 negotiations that resulted in the company's sale to CBS; he subsequently became vice president and general manager of the Fender Musical Instrument and Fender Sales divisions of CBS until his departure from the company in 1969.

In the 1970s, he founded Randall Amplifiers.

Randall was among the first six inductees into the Fender Hall of Fame in summer 2007, attending the ceremony in Scottsdale, Arizona, with his family.

== See also ==
- Fender Musical Instruments Corporation
