= Bass amplifier =

Electronic amplifier for musical instruments

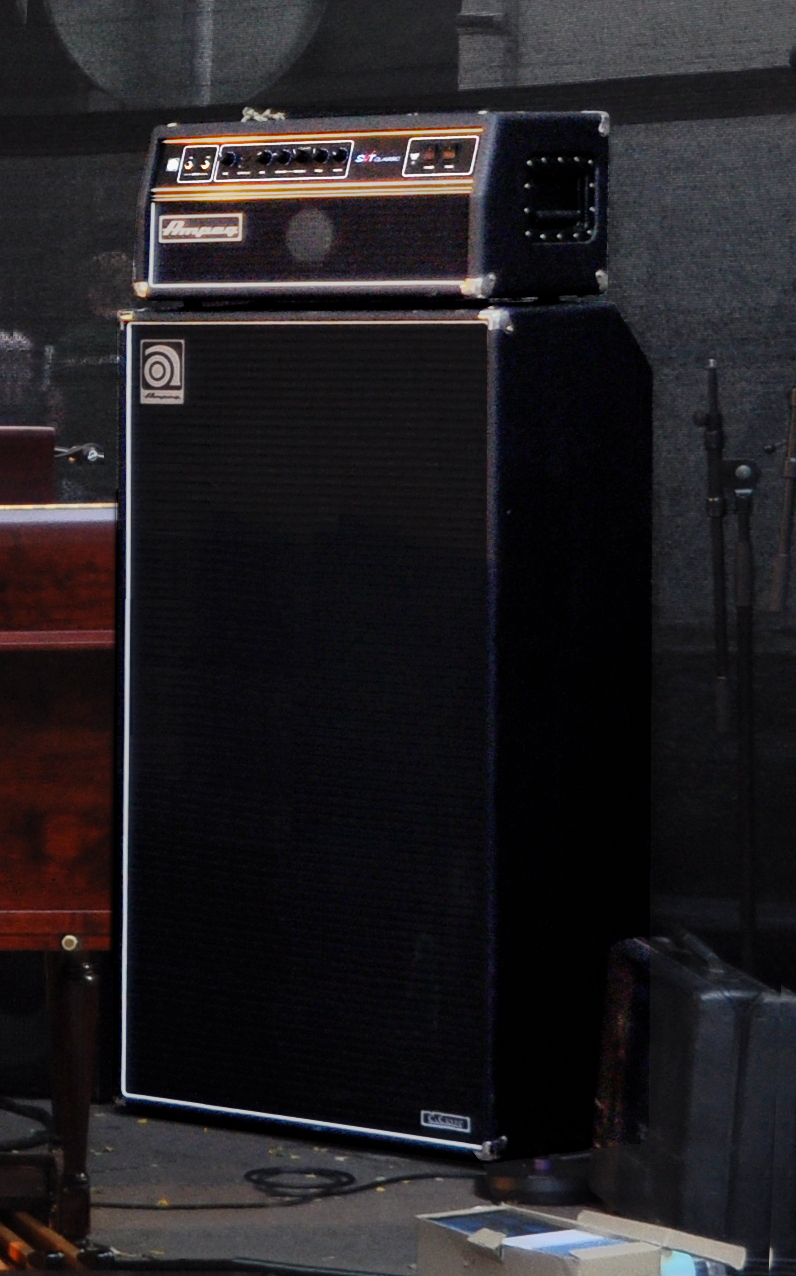
An Ampeg SVT cabinet with eight 10" speakers, with a separate Ampeg SVT amplifier "head" on top.

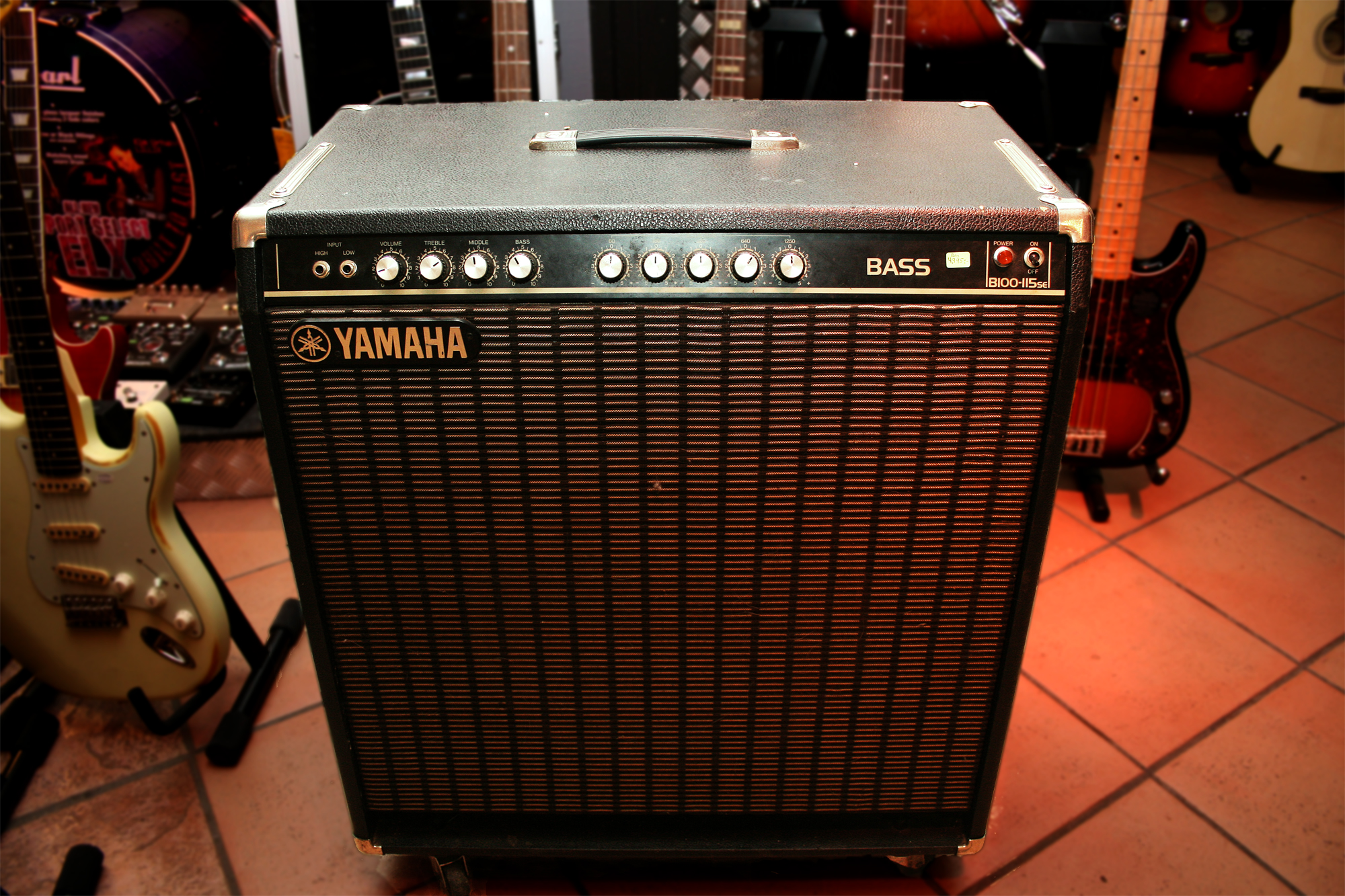
A Yamaha B100-115 combo amp, which contains a 100 watt amplifier and one 15" speaker in a wooden cabinet.

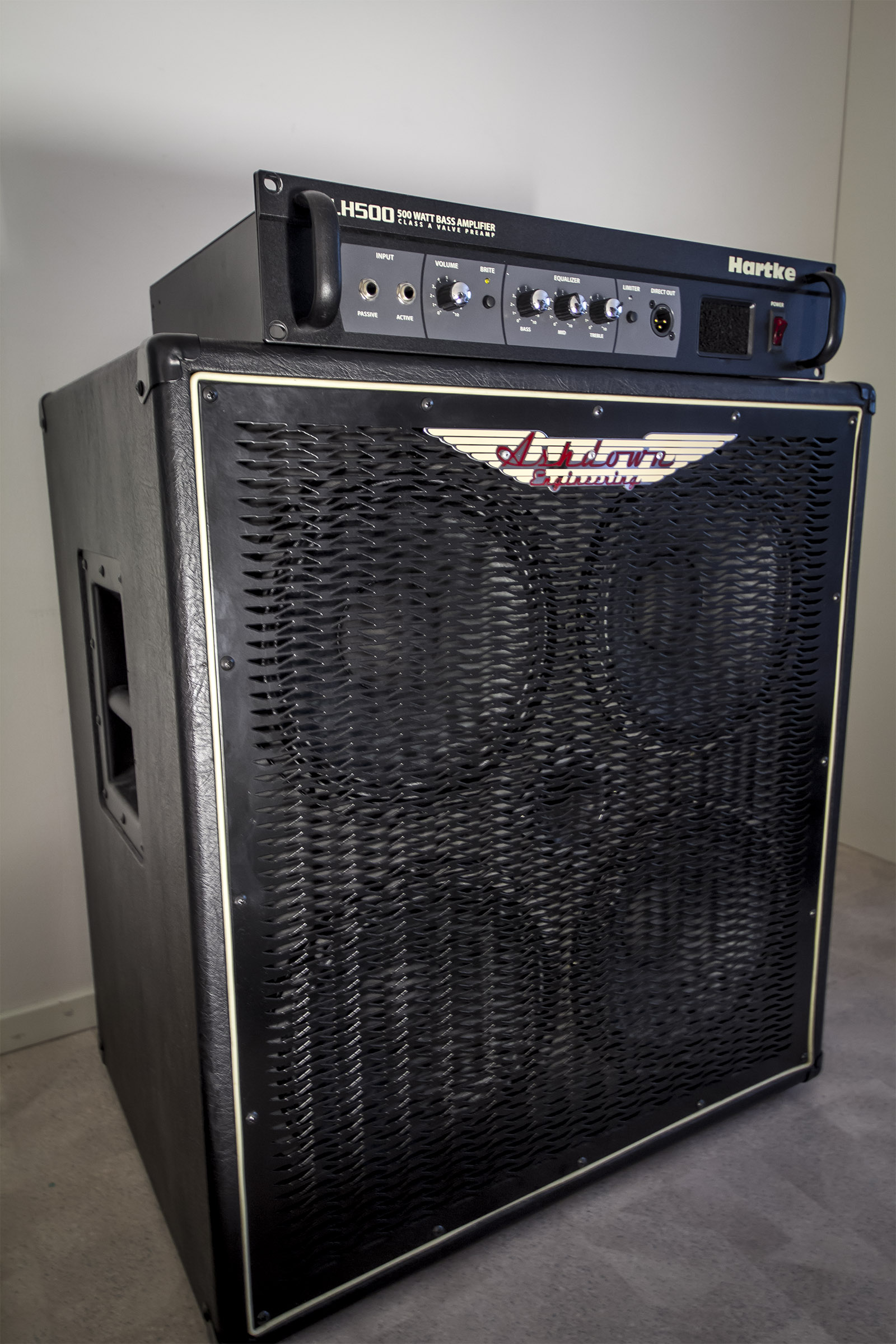
A Hartke 500 watt amp "head" on top of an Ashdown 4x10" speaker cabinet.

A bass amplifier (also abbreviated to bass amp) is a musical instrument electronic device that uses electrical power to make lower-pitched instruments such as the bass guitar or double bass loud enough to be heard by the performers and audience. Bass amps typically consist of a preamplifier, tone controls, a power amplifier and one or more loudspeakers ("drivers") in a cabinet.

While bass amps share many features with the guitar amplifiers used for electric guitar, they are distinct from other types of amplification systems, due to the particular challenges associated with low-frequency sound reproduction. This distinction affects the design of the loudspeakers, the size and design of the speaker cabinet and the design of the preamplifier and amplifier. Speaker cabinets for bass amps usually incorporate larger loudspeakers (e.g., 15 inches (380 mm) speakers are more common for bass than for electric guitar amps) or more speakers and larger cabinet sizes than those used for the amplification of other instruments. The loudspeakers themselves must also be sturdier to handle the higher power levels and they must be capable of reproducing very low pitches at high sound pressure levels.

== History ==
=== 1920s–1940s ===
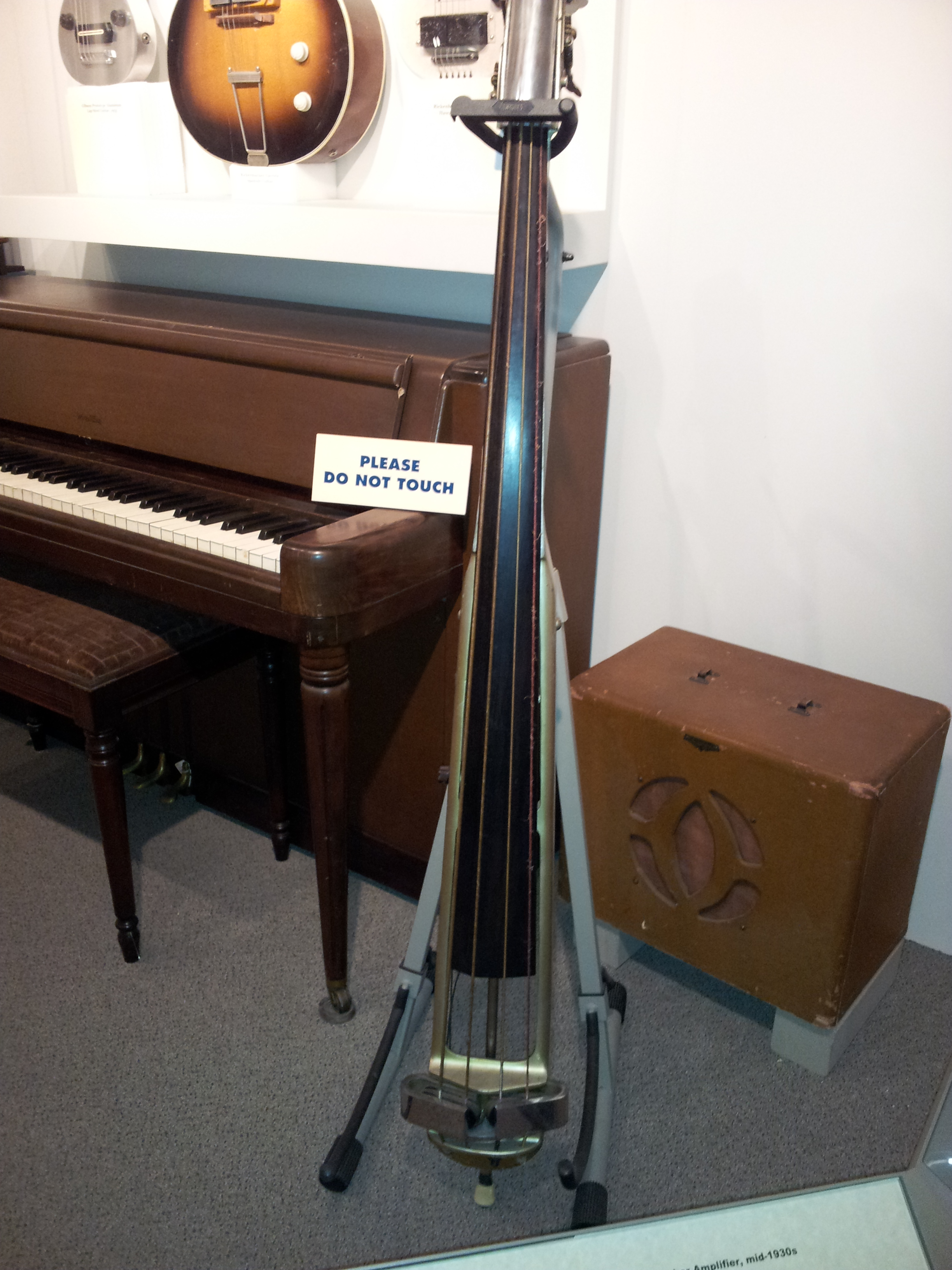
A 1930s era combo amplifier and a Rickenbacker electric upright bass from 1935.

The bassists who first sought methods to make their instruments louder were upright bass players. While the upright bass is a large instrument, standing about six feet tall (with its endpin extended), due to its low register it is not a loud instrument when played acoustically and because human hearing is less sensitive at low frequencies. In the 1890s and early 1900s, upright bass players performing in bars and brothels often found it difficult to be heard by the audience over louder instruments such as trumpet. A partial solution was playing slap bass style, slapping the strings against the fingerboard to make a relatively loud percussive sound.

In 1933, the Audiovox Manufacturing Company was founded by Paul Tutmarc, subsequently the inventor of the first electric bass, the fretted and solid-body Audiovox Model 736 Bass Fiddle, in 1936, which was designed to be played in a guitar-like horizontal manner. The instrument was sold with the first purpose-built bass amplifier, the Audiovox Model 936. Seen largely as a novelty, the few that were sold remained in the Seattle area.

=== 1950s–1970s ===
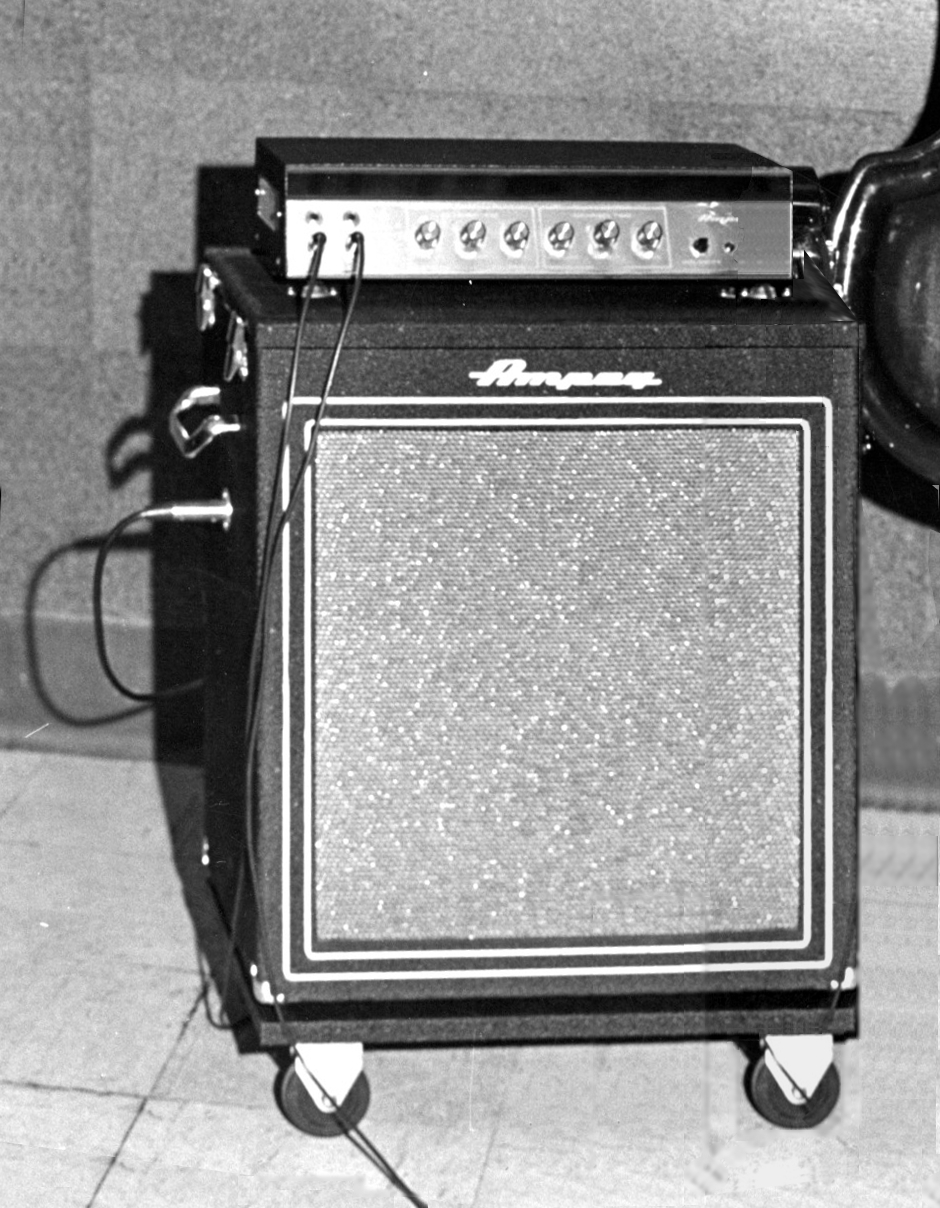
A vintage Ampeg B-15 amp and speaker cabinet.

The Ampeg Bassamp Company, founded in 1949 by Everett Hull, responded to the growing demand for electric bass equipment by producing a line of bass amplifiers. The first model offered was the Super 800, an 18-watt model with a single 12" speaker and a rear ventilation port. In 1951, Ampeg introduced a 20-watt version with a 15-inch speaker. In 1960, they introduced the B-15 Portaflex, a flip-top 25-watt tube bass amplifier with a single 15" speaker. While the Portaflex had a pleasing bass tone, and was used by studio bassists such as James Jamerson and Carol Kaye, it was not powerful enough to be used in a stadium or arena concert. Ampeg amplifiers were widely used by electric bass guitarists in the 1950s and 1960s.

Leo Fender resurrected the solid-body "bass guitar" in 1950 with the Fender Precision bass. Unlike the upright bass, a solid-body electric bass does not produce acoustic sound from a hollow body; while an upright bass player often benefits from using a bass amp, a bass amp is a necessity for an electric bass player.

By the late 1960s, as electric guitarists in rock bands began using powerful amplifiers to play large venues, bassists needed to keep up. The Acoustic 360 was a "200-watt, solid state head designed to drive the 361 cabinet, a rear-firing 18" speaker enclosure". The engineers who designed the amp and cabinet in 1967, Harvey Gerst and Russ Allee, mounted the 18" speaker in a folded horn enclosure; the 360 amp had a built-in fuzz bass effects unit. The Acoustic 360 and its 361 cabinet "...got the bass world ready for the Woodstocks, Altamonts and giant festival concerts" and it was used by notable players such as funk bassist Larry Graham, Led Zeppelin's bassist John Paul Jones and jazz fusion player Jaco Pastorius. John Paul Jones used two of the amp/cabs in Led Zeppelin; Dave Brown used them with Santana; John McVie played with the amp/cab in the beginning years of Fleetwood Mac. In December 1967, the loud sound of the Acoustic 360 led to The Doors getting "...arrested for noise violations".

Another 1960s-era amp and speaker that was used for loud, large venue performances was the Ampeg SVT (Super Vacuum Tube), a 300-watt amplifier head "powered by fourteen [vacuum] tubes" designed to be used with an 8x10" speaker cabinet.

The Vox T-60/AC-100 bass amplifier uses two 15-inch cabinets and thirty-to-forty watts of solid-state power using "germanium transistors". The Sunn Model T was used by The Moody Blues, Kiss, Queen, The Who's John Entwistle and Rush's Geddy Lee. The Sunn used a 150-watt amp with "four 12AX7WA tubes, followed by two 12AX7A tubes, and powered by four 6L6GC tubes".

The Gallien-Krueger 800RB was a solid state bass amplifier head introduced in 1983 that was liked by bassists for its loud, clean sound and durable construction. It introduced the concept of bi-amplification, as it sent 300 watts of low register sound to the bass speakers and 100 watts to the tweeter. The GK used a tube preamp simulator circuit called "boost". GK 800RB users include Red Hot Chili Peppers bassist Flea and Guns N' Roses' Duff McKagan.

The Marshall JMP Super Bass is a 100 watt amp. Lemmy, bassist/lead singer of Motörhead, used numerous of these amps to drive cabinets with four 12" speakers and others with four 15" speakers. His amps were labelled named "Killer," "No Remorse," and "Murder One". The Peavey Mark IV is a large, solid-state amp providing 300 watts at 2 ohms; the Mark IV was known for its affordable price and its reliability.

Fender developed a bass amplifier, the Fender Bassman, first produced in 1952. This was a 26-watt tube amplifier with a single 15" speaker. In 1954, the Bassman was redesigned to use four 10" speakers. This speaker cabinet was an open-back design; as such, it had poor low-frequency efficiency and was prone to blowing speakers when used for bass because of the lack of damping. The Bassman became very popular as an electric guitar amplifier. The circuit design also underwent repeated modifications. The "5F6A" circuit introduced in 1958 is regarded as a classic amplifier design and was copied by many other manufacturers, such as Marshall.

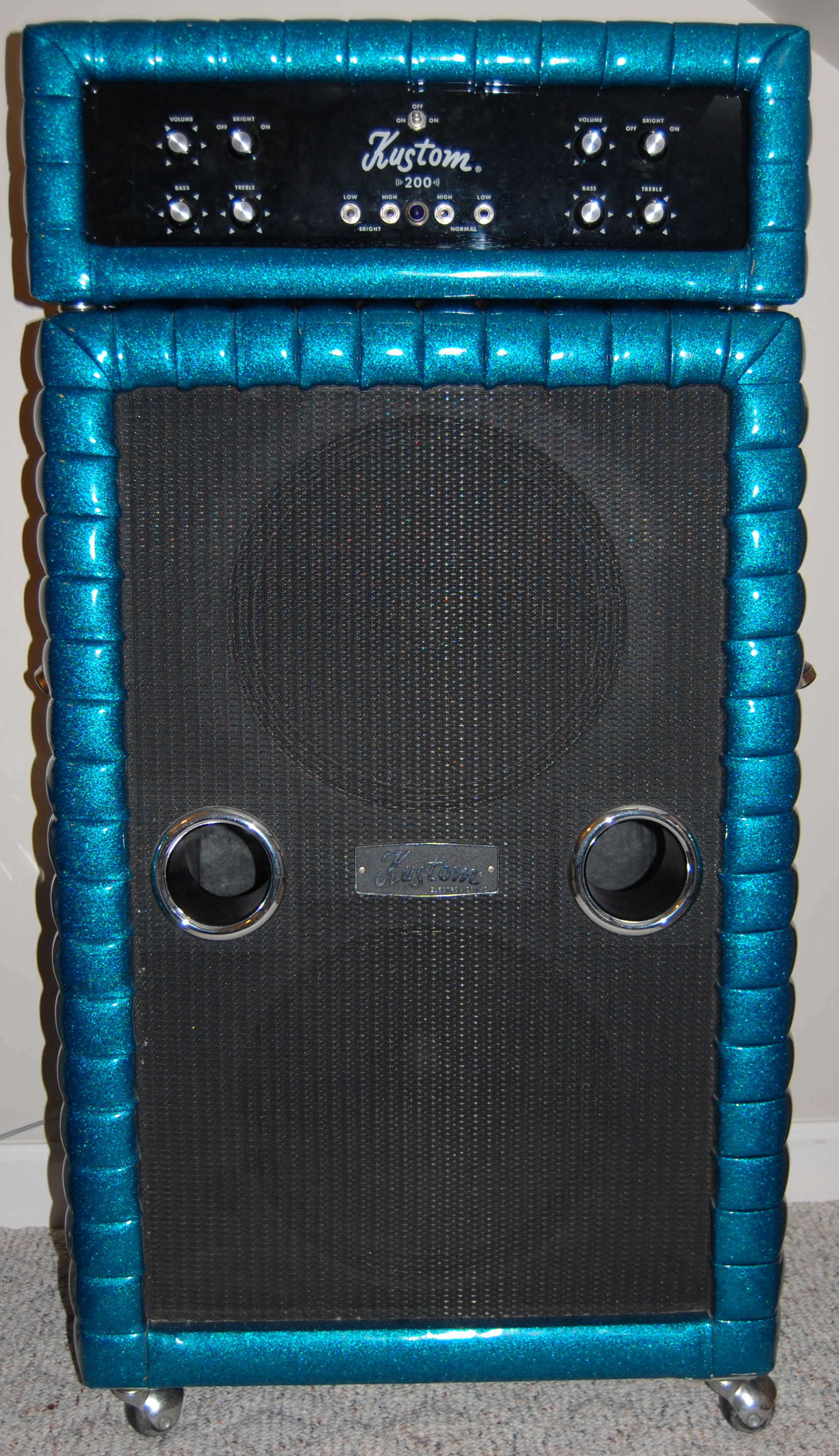
A Kustom 200 bass amplifier from 1971, featuring a separate amp head on top of a 2 x 15" speaker cabinet..

The early rock bands of the 1960s used the PA system only for vocals. The electric guitarist and electric bassist had to produce their sound for the hall, club or other venue with their own amplifiers and speaker cabinets. As a result, bass players from the 1960s often used large, powerful amplifiers and large speaker cabinets. Some bass players would even use multiple bass amplifiers, with the signal from one bass amp being sent to one or more "slave" amps. In the mid-1960s John Entwistle (The Who) was one of the first major players to make use of Marshall stacks. At a time when most bands used 50- to 100-watt amplifiers with single cabinets, Entwistle used twin stacks with new experimental prototype 200-watt amplifiers. This, in turn, also had a strong influence on the band's contemporaries at the time, with Jack Bruce of Cream and Noel Redding of the Jimi Hendrix Experience both following suit.

Entwistle also experimented throughout his career with "bi-amplification," where the higher frequencies of the bass sound are divided from the lower frequencies, with each frequency range sent to separate amplifiers and speakers. This allows for more control over the tone, because each portion of the frequency range can then be modified (e.g., in terms of tone, added overdrive, etc.) individually. The Versatone Pan-O-Flex amplifier used a different approach to bi-amplification, with separate amplifier sections for bass and treble but a single 12-inch speaker. The Versatone was used by well-known bassists such as Jack Casady and Carol Kaye.

Grateful Dead bassist Phil Lesh used an unusual method of bass amplification which was part of the band's 1970s Wall of Sound (Grateful Dead) PA system. The signal from each string on the bass was sent to its own amplifier and speakers. This added a wider spatial effect to the bass and also reduced the Intermodulation distortion between the strings. In later years, Lesh's bass signal was so powerful that fans dubbed the area in front of his speakers the Phil Zone, which was referenced in the band's CD Fallout from the Phil Zone.

=== 1980s–2010s ===
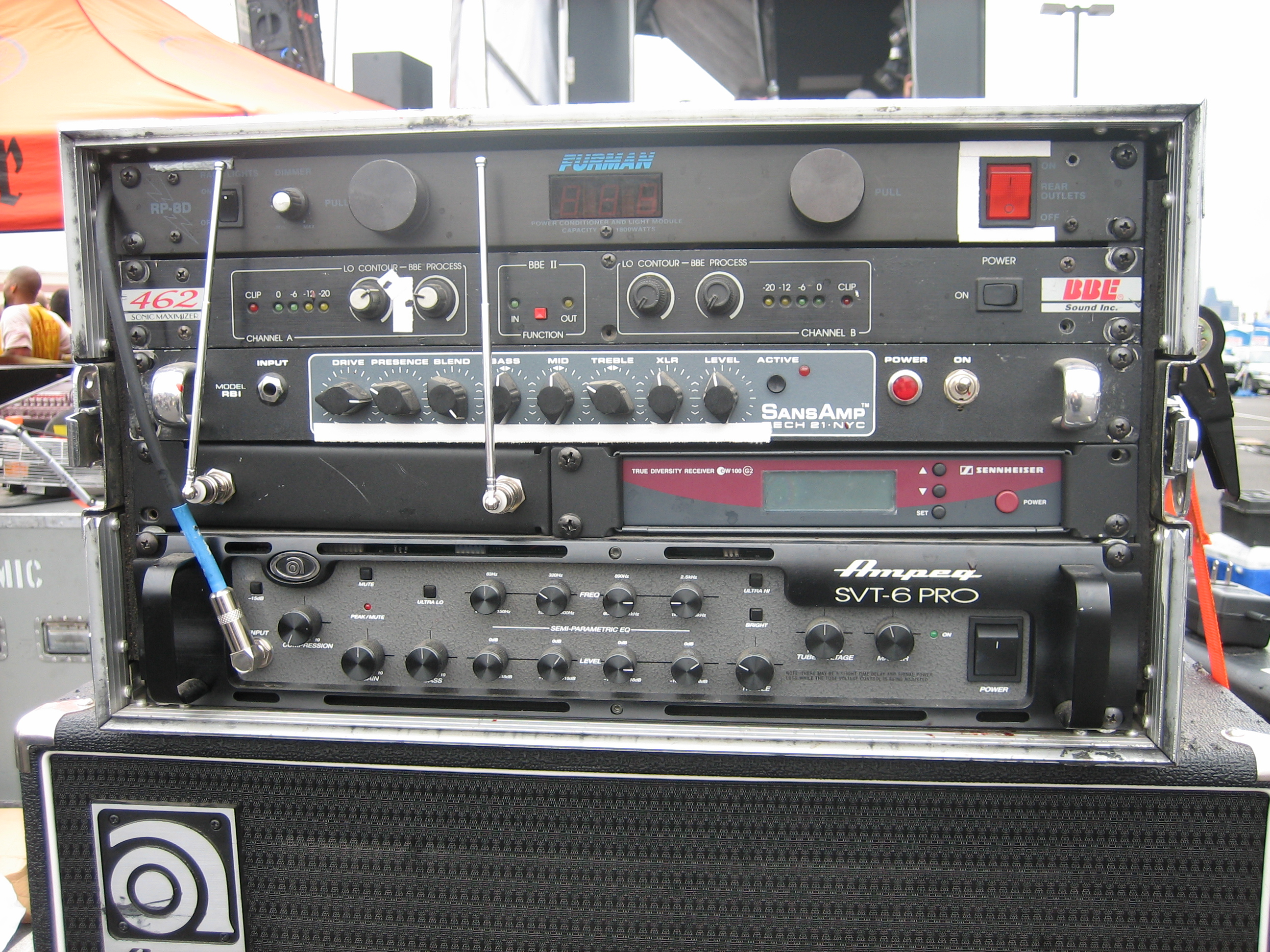
A bass rack from a professional bass player's touring setup. The bass amplifier is the lowest chassis in the rack; above it are a wireless receiver, several pre-amplifier devices, and a power conditioner.

In the 1980s the role of bass in popular and rock music evolved to become more melodic rather than simply providing a rhythmic function. The amplifier brand strongly identified with this new, 'scooped' sound (with strong bass and treble boost and mid-cut) was Trace Elliot. There were several features which made their amplifiers unique: the GP11 pre-amp featured 11 graphic EQ bands which were very broad bands, overlapping each other, thereby enabling massive amounts of frequency cut or boost when adjacent bands were boosted or cut. Secondly, the frequency bands were spaced closer together towards the bass end allowing even more variation for bass guitarists to alter their sound like no other amp had previously allowed. Added to this were MOSFET poweramps of 250 or 500 watts and the option of bi-amplified systems where bass and upper frequencies are filtered before being separately amplified and fed to dedicated high frequency and low frequency speaker cabinets. Trace Elliot gained a reputation for themselves; rumour has it that early users were John Paul Jones of Led Zeppelin, Andy Rourke of The Smiths and Brian Helicopter of punk band The Shapes. Mark King of Level 42 was also an early adopter of the brand. The company, now dedicated to manufacturing, moved to new premises in Witham, Essex, in 1985 to satisfy the growing demand.

As PA systems improved, horn-loaded "bass bins" and subwoofers were added and were often well-equipped to amplify directly fed bass guitar and keyboard frequencies. As well, in the 1980s and 1990s, monitor systems were substantially improved, which allowed sound engineers to provide on-stage musicians with a loud, clear, and full-range reproduction of their instruments' sound.

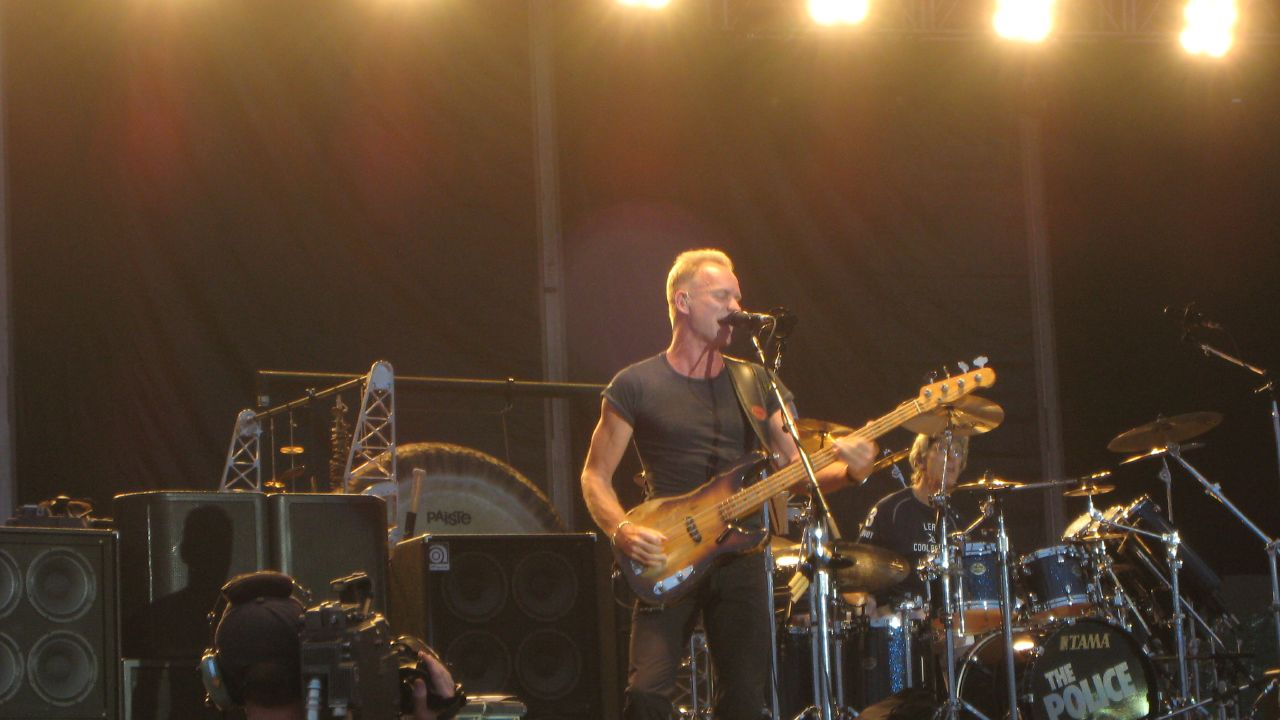
In this 2007 photo of The Police's singer-bassist Sting, several Ampeg cabinets with multiple 10" speakers can be seen on the left side.

As a result of the improvements to PA systems and monitor systems, bass players in the 2000s no longer need to have huge, powerful bass amplifier systems to play stadiums and arenas. Instead of playing with two 8x10" bass stacks and one or more huge, powerful bass heads, in the 2010s, many bass players perform at large live venues with relatively small and less powerful bass amplifiers. The reason they can do so is that most higher-priced 2010s-era bass amplifiers usually have DI output jacks that can be patched into the audio snake cable, and then plugged into the mainstage mixing board and amplified through the PA system or sound reinforcement system.

In the 2010s, virtually all of the sound reaching the audience in large venues comes from the PA system or sound reinforcement system, the huge speaker systems pointed at the audience. As well, in the 2010s on-stage instrument amplifiers are more likely to be kept at a low volume, because when band members have their onstage amps "cranked" to high volume levels on stage, this makes it harder for the audio engineer to control the sound mix and blend. For example, if a heavy metal bassist had two 8x10" cabinets and several 1x18" subwoofer cabinets and several thousand watts of bass amplifier heads, and these amps are set to a very high volume level, this bass player will be creating very significant onstage bass volume. If the sound engineer wished to turn down the bass in the PA/sound reinforcement system, this bassist's loud onstage volume would make it hard for this engineer to control and/or reduce the volume of bass in the FOH (Front of House) sound mix. Another issue that can develop with bass players who have very high onstage volume is that it can be hard for the audio engineer to produce a clean sound through the PA/sound reinforcement system. For example, if a bassist was driving his bass amp speaker stacks into clipping to create a fuzz bass tone, if the audio engineer wished to have a "clean" bass sound, this could pose a challenge.

As a result of requests by audio engineers to reduce onstage volume, in the 2010s, in many large venues. much of the on-stage sound reaching the musicians now comes from the monitor speakers or in-ear monitors, not from the instrument amplifiers. Stacks of huge speaker cabinets and amplifiers are still used in concerts in some genres of music, especially heavy metal, but they tend to be used more for the visual effect than for sound reproduction.

In some small to mid-size venues, such as bars and nightclubs, the PA system may not have the capacity to provide the bass sound for the venue, and the PA system may be used mainly for vocals. Bass players in bands that play at a variety of venues, including these types of small to mid-size venues, may need to be able to provide the bass sound for the venue, and so they will require a large combo amp or bass stack with this capability.

== Types ==
Different types of equipment are used to amplify the electric bass and other bass instruments, depending on the performance setting, style of music, the sound desired by the bassist, the size of the venue and other factors, such as whether a bassist is an amateur or professional musician. Professional bassists are more likely to have expensive "boutique" amps and cabinets. All types of bass amps and cabinets are designed to be transportable to shows and recording studios, and as such, most have various features to protect the cabinet (e.g., metal or plastic corner protectors) and speakers (a plastic screen or metal grille) during transportation and move the equipment (a single carry handle is standard for practice amps and combo amps and two handles are sometimes provided for two-handed carrying of large cabinets, and wheels are mounted on some large combo amps and cabinets). Amplifier "heads" may be sold mounted in a wooden cabinet with a carrying handle, or they may be sold as rackmount-able components, which can be screw-mounted in a 19" road case for protection. The speaker enclosures for combo amps and speaker cabinets are typically covered in stiff vinyl, carpet, felt or other sturdy fabric, or painted.

=== Practice amps ===
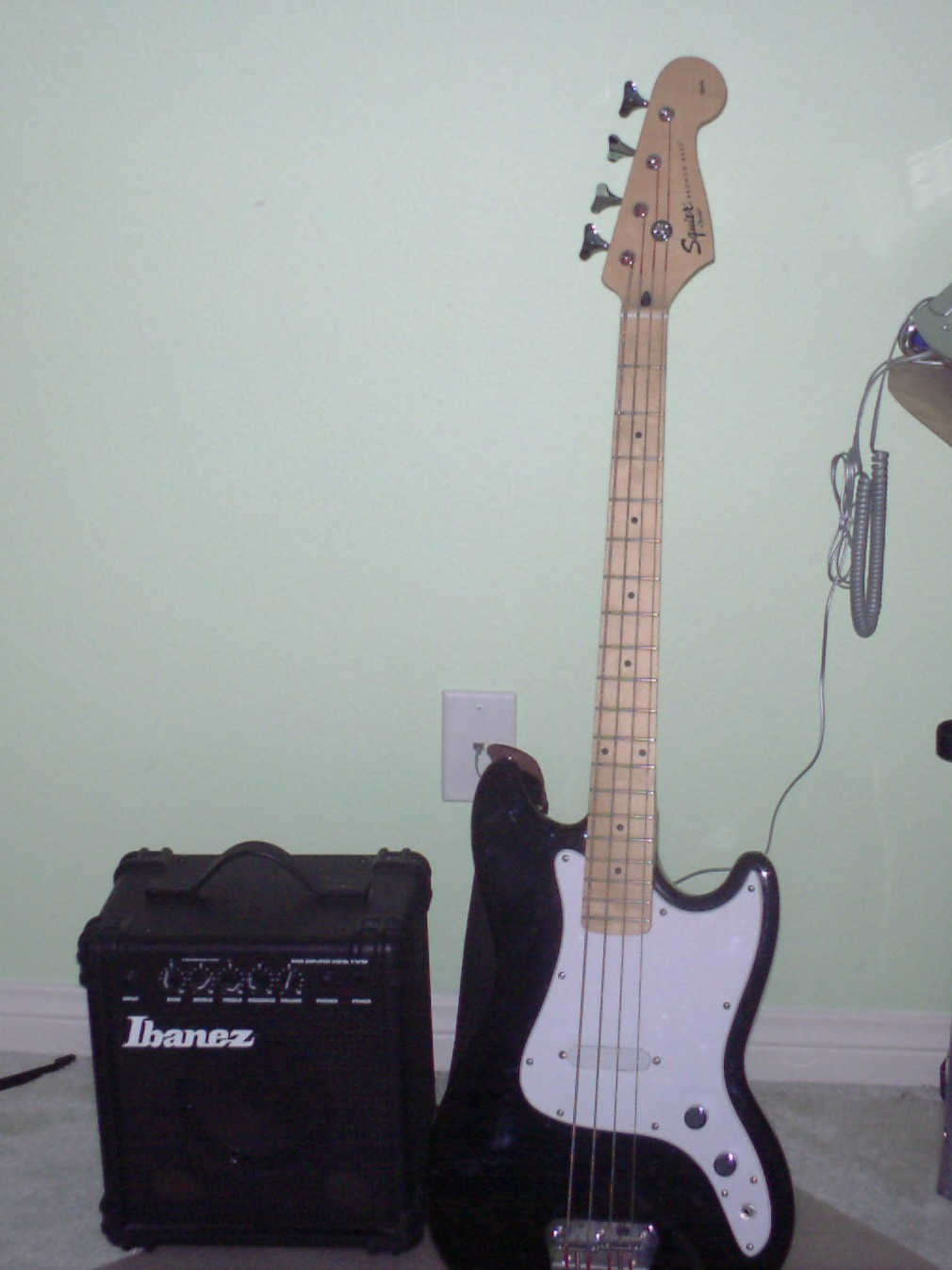
Small practice amplifier have low wattage and low volume which make them mostly suited to individual learning of basslines.

The smallest bass amps amplify the instrument enough for individual practice in a small room. Practice amps do not typically produce enough volume or low-frequency sound reproduction to be used in a band rehearsal or show. As such, they are mostly used by beginners or, when used by professionals, for warm-up or individual practice. They are more likely than full-size combo amp cabinets to have an open-back design, like an electric guitar combo amp.

Some buskers playing on the street for tips may use battery-powered practice amps, a feature available on some models.

Practice amps may have an auxiliary line-in jack, allowing a CD player or electronic metronome to be mixed into the output for practice purposes. As well, there is often a headphone output jack.

Higher-priced practice amps may have a DI out jack, so that the preamplifier signal can be connected directly to a mixing board for a live show's sound reinforcement system or for a sound recording session. DI out-equipped units effectively turn the practice amp into a preamplifier unit.

=== Combo amps ===
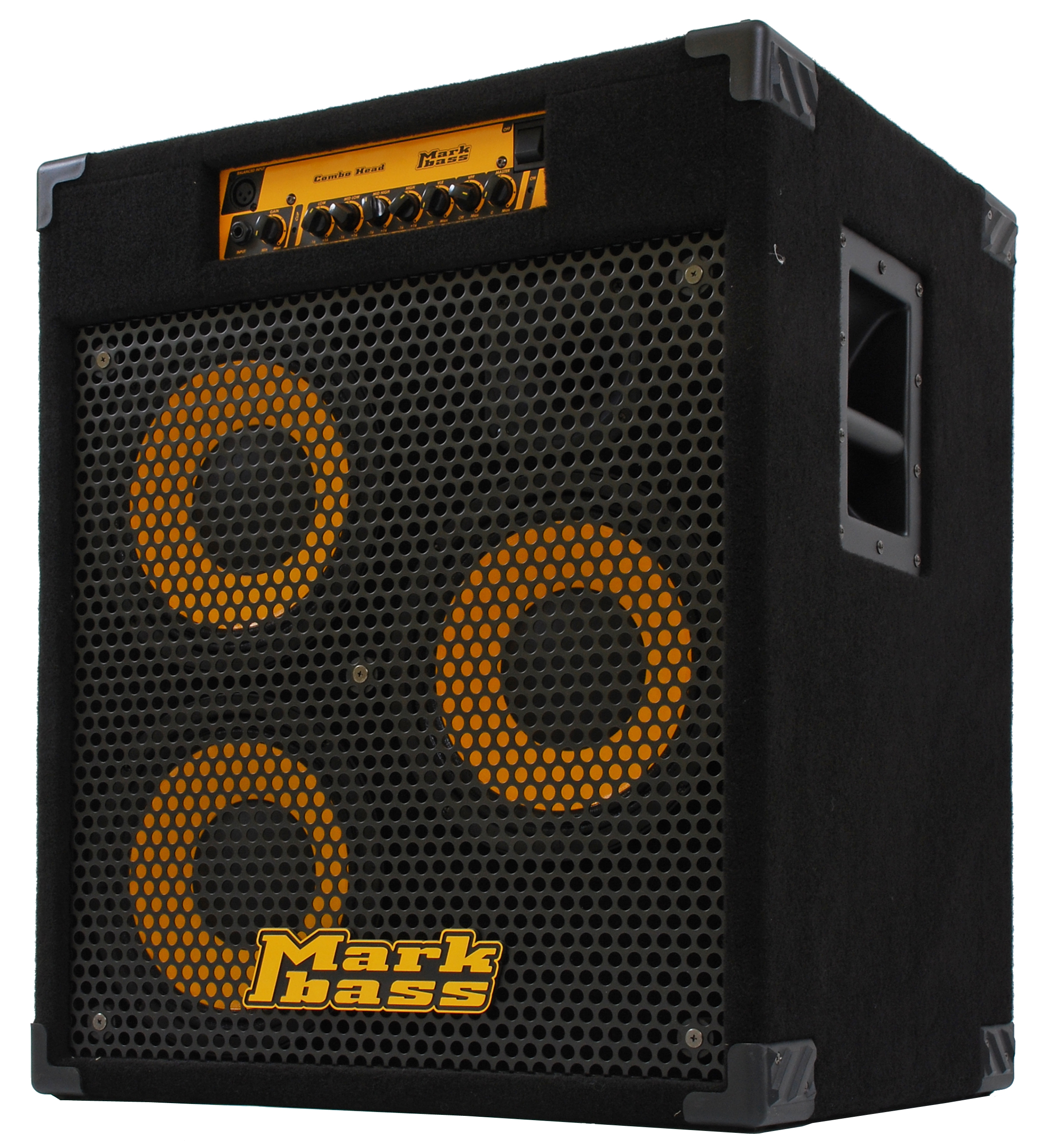
A Markbass 3x10" combo amp.

For rehearsals, studio recording sessions, or small club performances, electric and upright bass players typically use a "combo" amplifier, which combines a preamplifier, tone controls, a power amplifier and a speaker (or multiple speakers) in a single cabinet. Smaller combo amps may be easier to transport and set up than using separate amplifier and speaker units, and as such, they are a popular choice for many bass players.

Bass players in quieter, more acoustic genres may be able to use smaller, more modestly powered combo amps. Bassists who play in genres more associated with a high stage volume (e.g., hard rock or electric blues) may tend to use, larger, more powerful (in wattage) combo amps.

=== Bass stacks ===
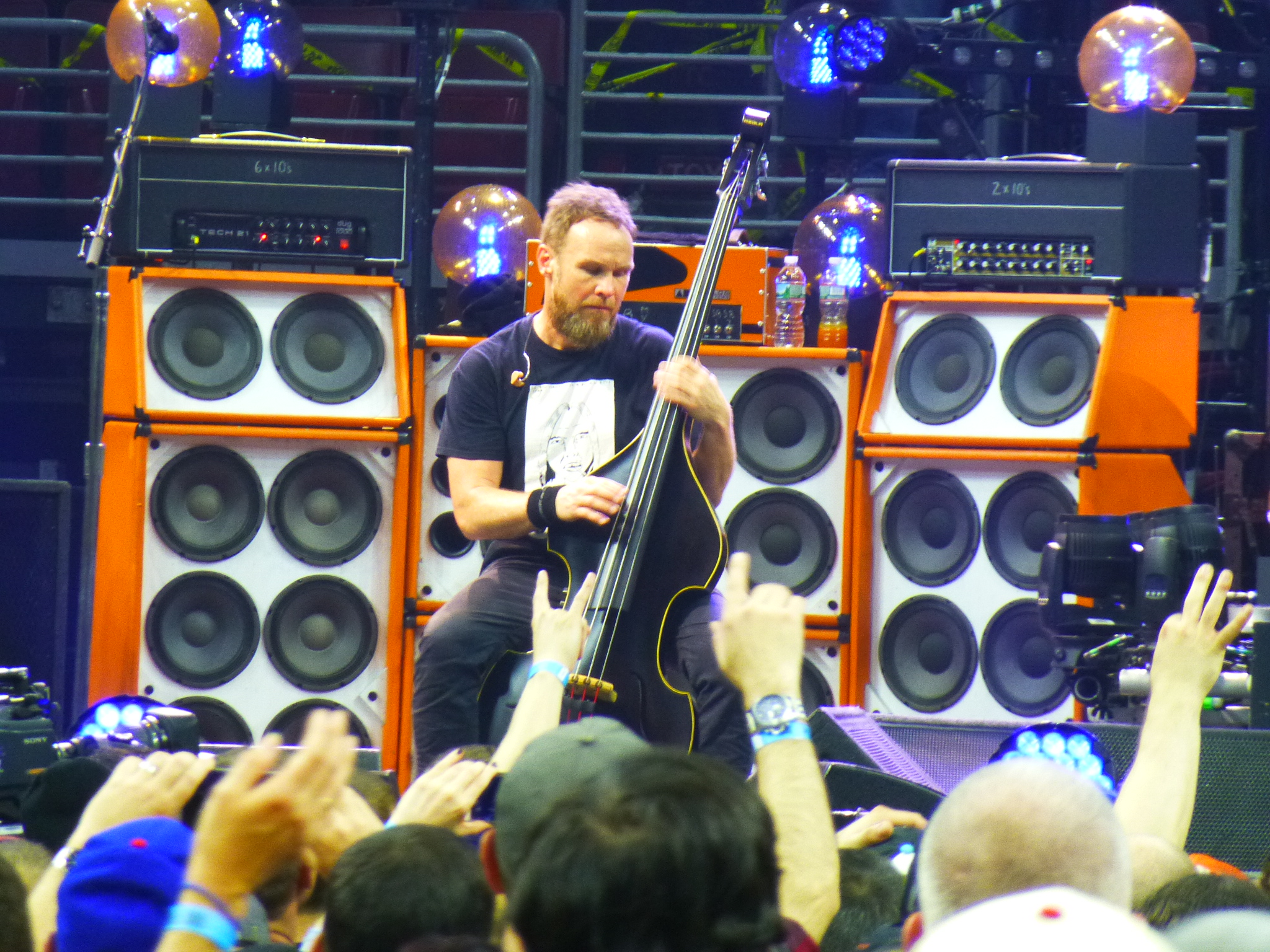
Bassist Jeff Ament (Pearl Jam) in front of a wall of bass stacks.

For larger venues such as stadiums and outdoor music festivals, or for music genres that use bass instruments with an extended lower range and high stage volumes, bass players often use a more powerful amplifier (300 to 2000 watts or more) and one or more separate speaker cabinets (or "cabs") in various combinations, called a "bass stack". An example of the powerful, loud bass amplifier systems used in grunge is Alice in Chains bassist Mike Inez's setup. He uses four Ampeg SVT-2PRO amplifier heads, two of them plugged into four 1x18" subwoofer cabinets for the low register, and the other two plugged into two 8x10" cabinets.

A bass stack may use a single speaker cabinet, e.g., a cabinet holding eight ten-inch speakers, or 8x10". Smaller speaker cabinets with one, two, or four speakers are more commonly used, because while the 8x10" cabinet is able to produce huge volume and powerful bass tone, the cabinets are very heavy and difficult to transport.

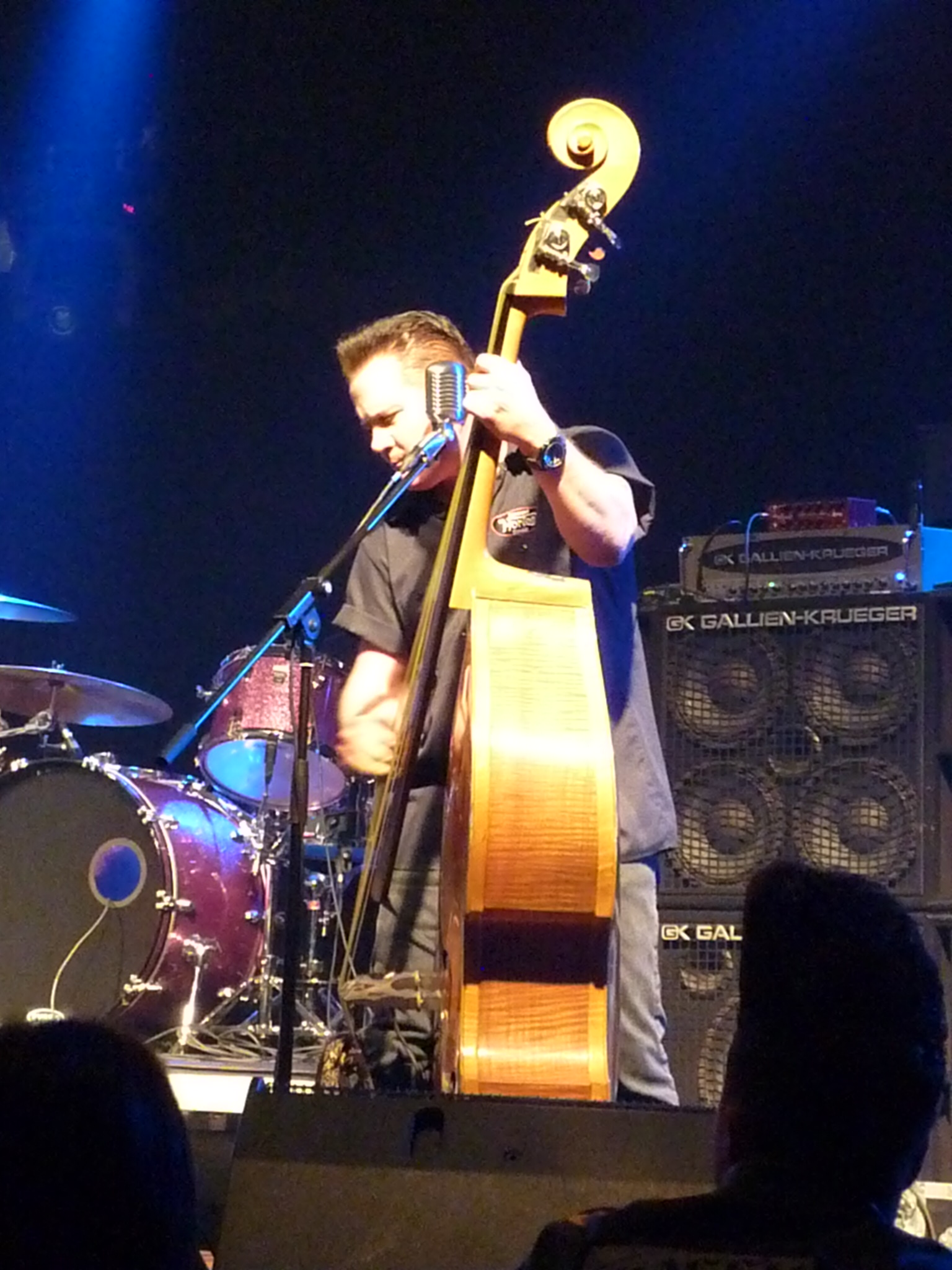
Psychobilly bassist Jimbo Wallace onstage with Reverend Horton Heat and a large bass stack consisting of a 1x15" cabinet, a 4x10" cabinet, and an amplifier "head".

Some single cabinets use mixed speaker sizes. Examples include MESA Engineering's 1x15"/4x10" cabinet, Peavey's PVH 1516, which has 1x15" and 2x8" speakers. and Traynor's TC1510 combo, which has 1x15" and 2x10".

Large cabinets with speaker sizes other than 10", 12" or 15" are less commonly used. Examples include the 6x8" and 8x8" cab configurations.

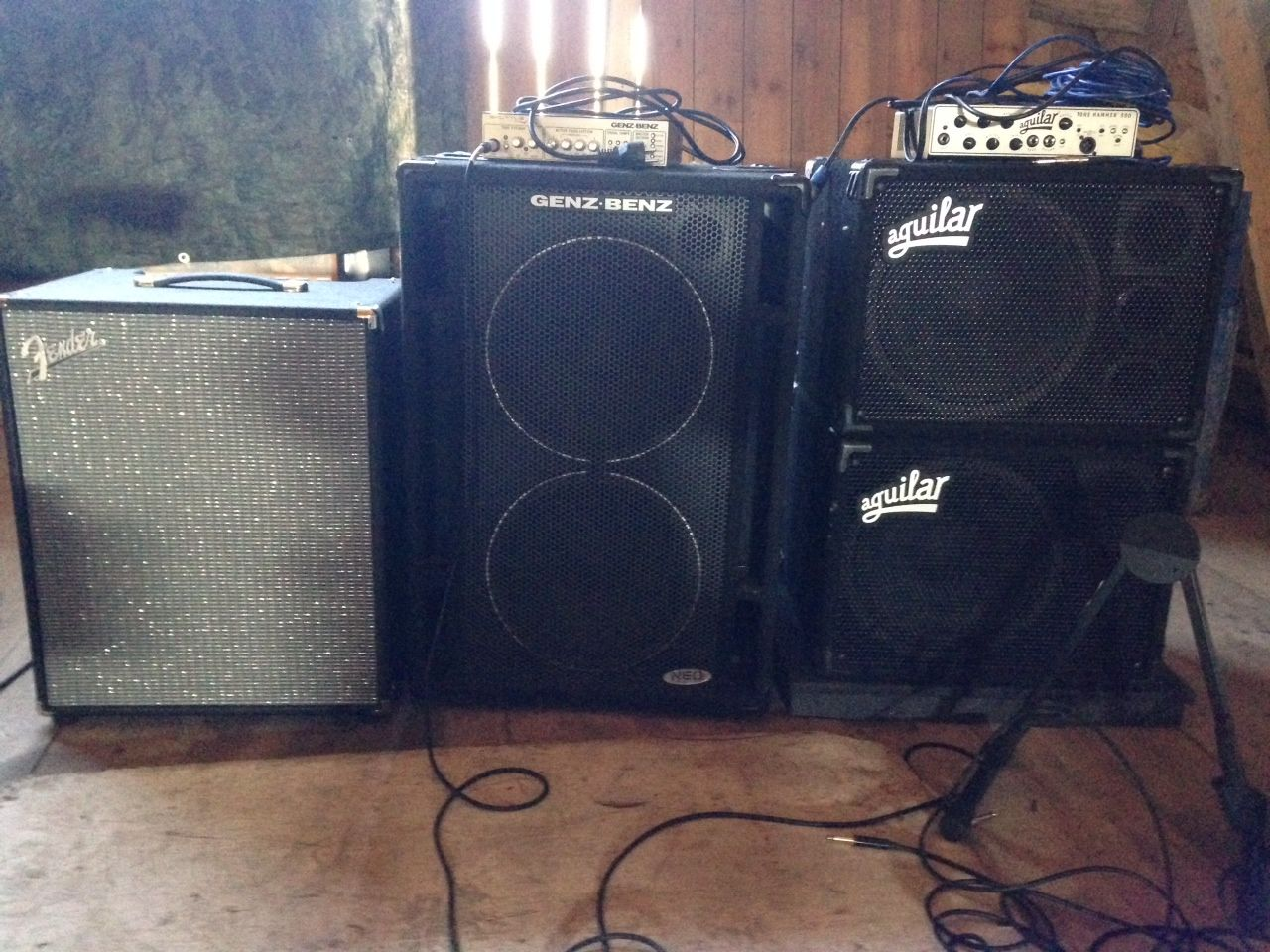
A selection of bass cabinets. From left to right: a Fender cab, a Genz Benz cab (and amp head) and two Aguilar cabinets.

One reason that some bass players choose to use a "bass stack" rather than a combo is that the separate component approach enables bassists to use different speaker cabinets for different shows or activities. For example, a bassist playing a stadium may use an 8x10" cab for this show, but then bring a 4x10" cab for a nightclub show the next day, or a 1x12" cab for a studio recording.

Large speaker cabinets may have attached lifting handles and dolly wheels to facilitate transportation.

Speaker cabinets with 1/4 input jacks typically have two parallel jacks, so that the amp head may be plugged into one cabinet, and then a second cabinet can be "daisy chained" by connecting it to the first cabinet. Cabinets with horn-loaded tweeters often have an attenuator knob for controlling the tweeter.

Bass cabinets have thicker wood panels than electric guitar amps, and often have stronger internal bracing. This reduces the likelihood of unwanted cabinet buzzes or rattles, which are more likely with bass cabinets due to the lower sound frequencies output.

"Open back" bass speaker cabinets are uncommon, because the configuration increases difficulty in clearly reproducing low-frequency tones.

==== Heads ====
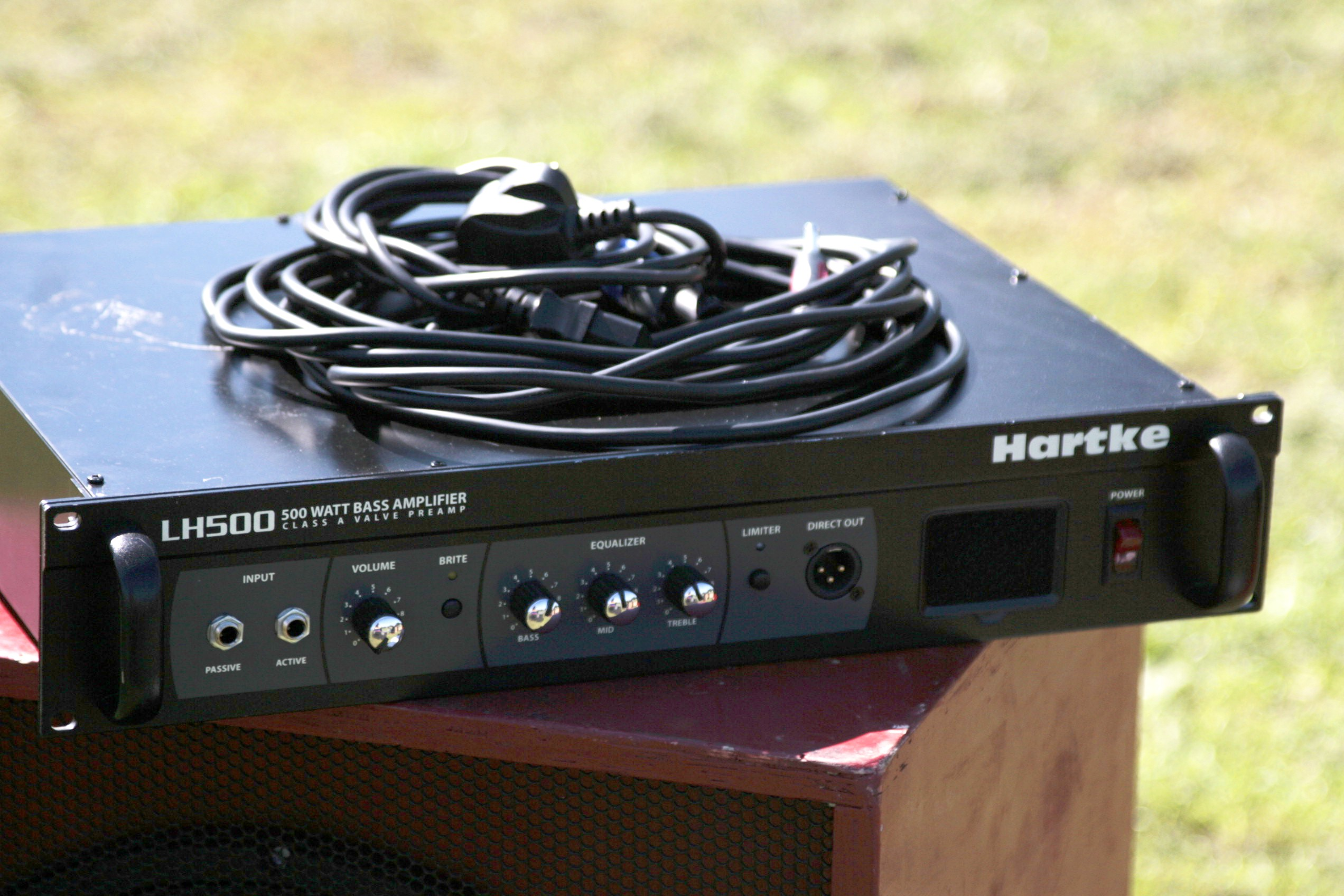
A Hartke LH500 bass amplifier "head", which is rated at 500 watts.

Separate bass amplifiers which do not contain speakers, often called "heads" or "amp heads", are usually integrated units, with a preamplifier, equalizer (bass and treble controls) and a power amplifier combined in a single unit. Some bassists use separate preamplifier/power amplifier setups, where one or more preamplifiers drive one or more power amplifiers. In the latter example, a bass player can use a bass-specific power amplifier or use a sound reinforcement system power amp. Bass amp heads are available in high-wattage power ratings that are not available in combo units. For example, the Ampeg SVT8-PRO amp head puts out 2,500 watts RMS at 2 ohms, a power level that is high enough for the largest 8x10" cabinets and the largest venues (stadiums, outdoor festivals, etc.).

If a player uses a separate preamplifier and power amplifier, she or he can buy a power amplifier intended for a sound reinforcement system or PA system or pick a power amplifier designed specifically for bass instruments. These preamps and power amps come in two formats: 19 inch rack-mountable units and units with their own wood or metal case. If a player uses a rackmountable preamp and power amp, these units and any effect units, such as an audio compressors, can be mounted in 19" rack mount road cases.

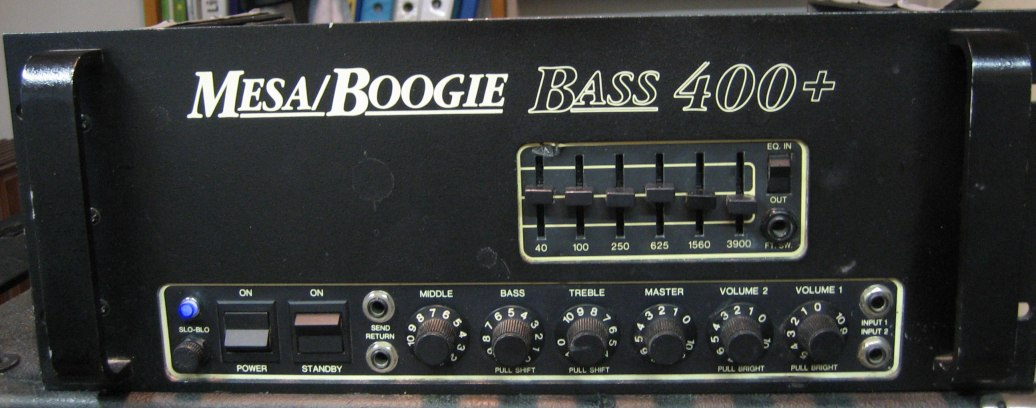
A Mesa/Boogie bass amplifier "head"; note the graphic equalizer sliders on the right side

The "bass stack" approach gives the bassist opportunity to customize the rig, mixing various models and brands of preamplifier, graphic equalizer, power amplifier and speaker cabinets as desired. As well, a failing component can be individually replaced without taking the entire rig out of service, as would occur with a combo amplifier.

Some professional-grade amp heads, such as Ampeg's SVT400-PRO, have an audio crossover, an electronic filter that splits the bass signal into a low-pitched signal (which could be routed to a cabinet suited for low-pitched sounds, such as a 1x15" or 2x15" cabinet), and the middle and high frequencies to a different cabinet suited to this register (e.g., a 2x10" or 4x10" cabinet with a horn-loaded tweeter). Amps with a crossover can either have a single crossover point pre-set at the factory (e.g., 100 Hz) or a knob is provided to enable the bassist to select the frequency where the bass signal is split into low and higher-pitched signal. Amps with an adjustable crossover point can enable bassists to fine-tune their speaker output for a particular venue.

== Amplifier technology ==
Amplifiers may be based on tube ("thermionic" or in the UK, "valve") or solid state (transistor) technology, or hybrid designs that use both technologies, typically by pairing a tube preamplifier with a transistor power amplifier.

=== Tube amplification ===
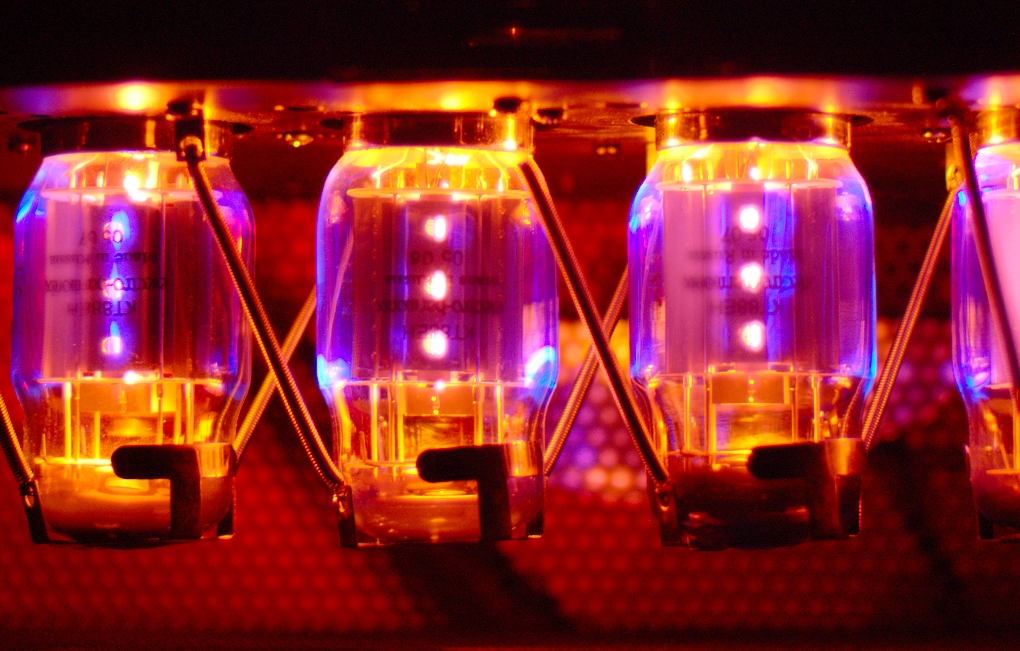
The glow from four "Electro Harmonix KT88" brand power tubes lights up the inside of a Canadian-made Traynor YBA-200 bass guitar amplifier.

Vacuum tubes were the dominant active electronic components in bass amplifiers manufactured from the 1950s until the early 1970s. Tube amplifiers for bass almost always use class AB_{1} topology for efficiency reasons. Many bass players believe that tube amplifiers produce a "warmer" or more "natural" sound than solid state amplifiers when lightly or moderately driven, and more pleasing distortion characteristics when overdriven. Some performers also believe that tube amps have a greater level of perceived loudness for a given amount of amplifier power.

Even though tube amplifiers produce more heat than solid state amplifiers, few manufacturers of tube amplifiers include cooling fans in the amplifiers' chassis. Usually adequate cooling is provided by passive convection. Adequate airflow is needed to prevent excessive heat from shortening the tubes' lifespan or producing tonal inconsistencies.

Tube amplifiers require more maintenance than solid state transistor amplifiers, such as replacing vacuum tubes and electrolytic capacitors. Tube amplifiers are usually heavier than an equivalently powered transistor amplifier. As tubes are made of glass, tube amplifiers are more fragile than a solid state amp.

=== Solid state amplification ===
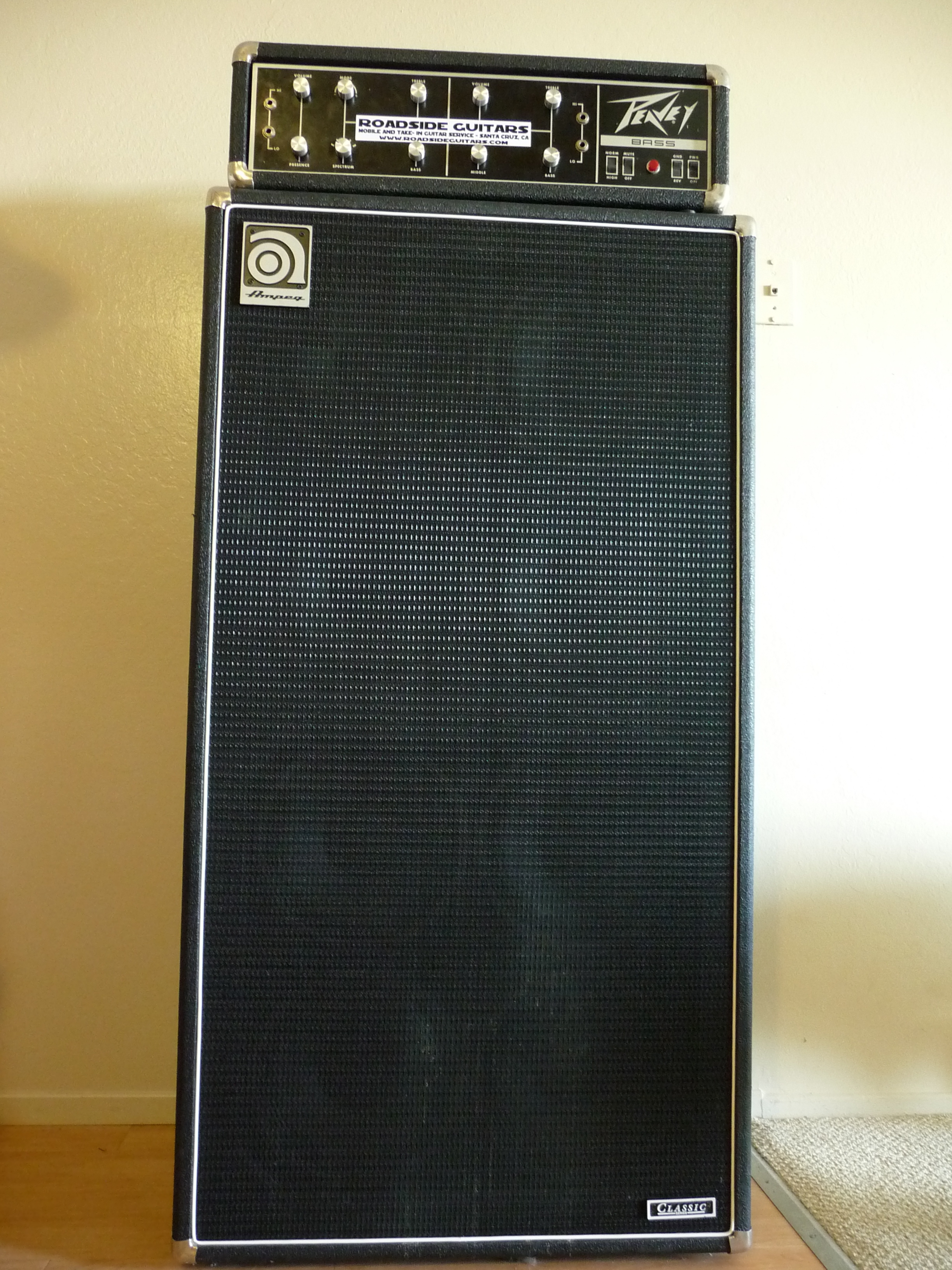
A Peavey bass amp head with an Ampeg 8x10" speaker cabinet.

By the 1960s and 1970s, semiconductor or transistor-based amplifiers (also called "solid state") began to become popular. This was in large part because for a given wattage level and feature level, solid state amplifiers are less expensive, lighter weight, and require less maintenance than tube amplifiers. As well, transistor amplifiers are more reliable and less fragile than tube amps.

The output transistors of solid state amplifiers can be passively cooled by using metal fins called heat sinks to radiate away the heat. For high-wattage amplifiers, a fan is often used to move air across internal heatsinks.

=== Hybrid ===
Hybrid bass amplifier heads typically pair a tube preamplifier with a solid-state power amplifier. This provides the player with the best elements of both amplifier technology. The tube preamp gives the player the ability to obtain tube amplifier tone, which tube enthusiasts state is "warmer" than a solid state (transistor) preamp. As well, tube users state that tube preamps have a more pleasing-sounding, natural tone when the preamp's volume is pushed up so high that the bass signal becomes overdriven; in contrast, a solid state preamp that is pushed to the point of signal "clipping" can be harsh-sounding. Some hybrid amp heads have a bypass switch, so that the tube preamp can be bypassed, if the tube breaks or develops a technical problem. The tube preamplified signal in a hybrid amplifier head is then sent to a solid state power amplifier. Compared with tube power amps, solid state power amplifiers are more reliable, require less maintenance, less fragile and lighter in weight. A hybrid tube preamp/solid state power amp thus provides a bass player with the benefits of both technologies' strengths: tube preamp tone and solid state reliability for the power amp.

=== Power in watts and volume ===
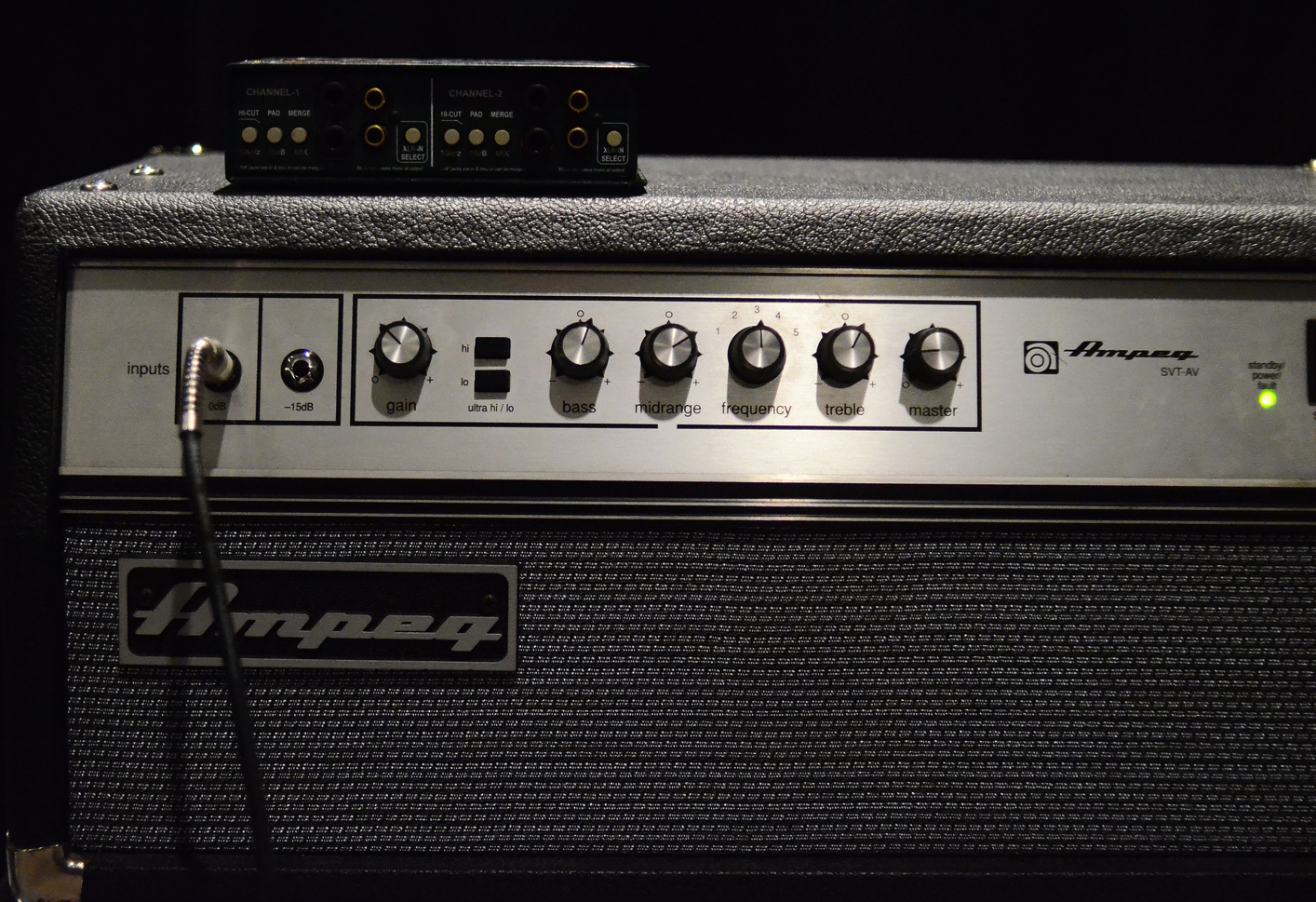
A close-up of an Ampeg SVT amplifier head's front panel.

The relationship between perceived volume (loudness) and power output in watts of an amplifier is not a linear relationship: The human ear perceives a 50-watt amplifier as only twice as loud as a five-watt amplifier, despite a tenfold increase in power in watts. Doubling the power of an amplifier results in a "just noticeable" increase in volume, so a 100-watt amplifier is only slightly louder than a 50-watt amplifier. In addition is the human ear's tendency to behave as a natural audio compressor at high volumes.

In a band, the bassist will typically need three or four times the wattage of the electric guitarist. While an electric guitarist will often find that a 50 watt amp will be adequate for rehearsals and mid-size performance venues, a bass player performing alongside them will typically need at least a 300 watt bass amp, six times the power of the electric guitar amp, to get a good bass volume. "More advanced players who regularly gig in small to medium sized venues… typically [use amps that] produce 300-700 watts of output." Some bassists believe a tube bass amp will sound louder than a solid-state bass amp of the same wattage.

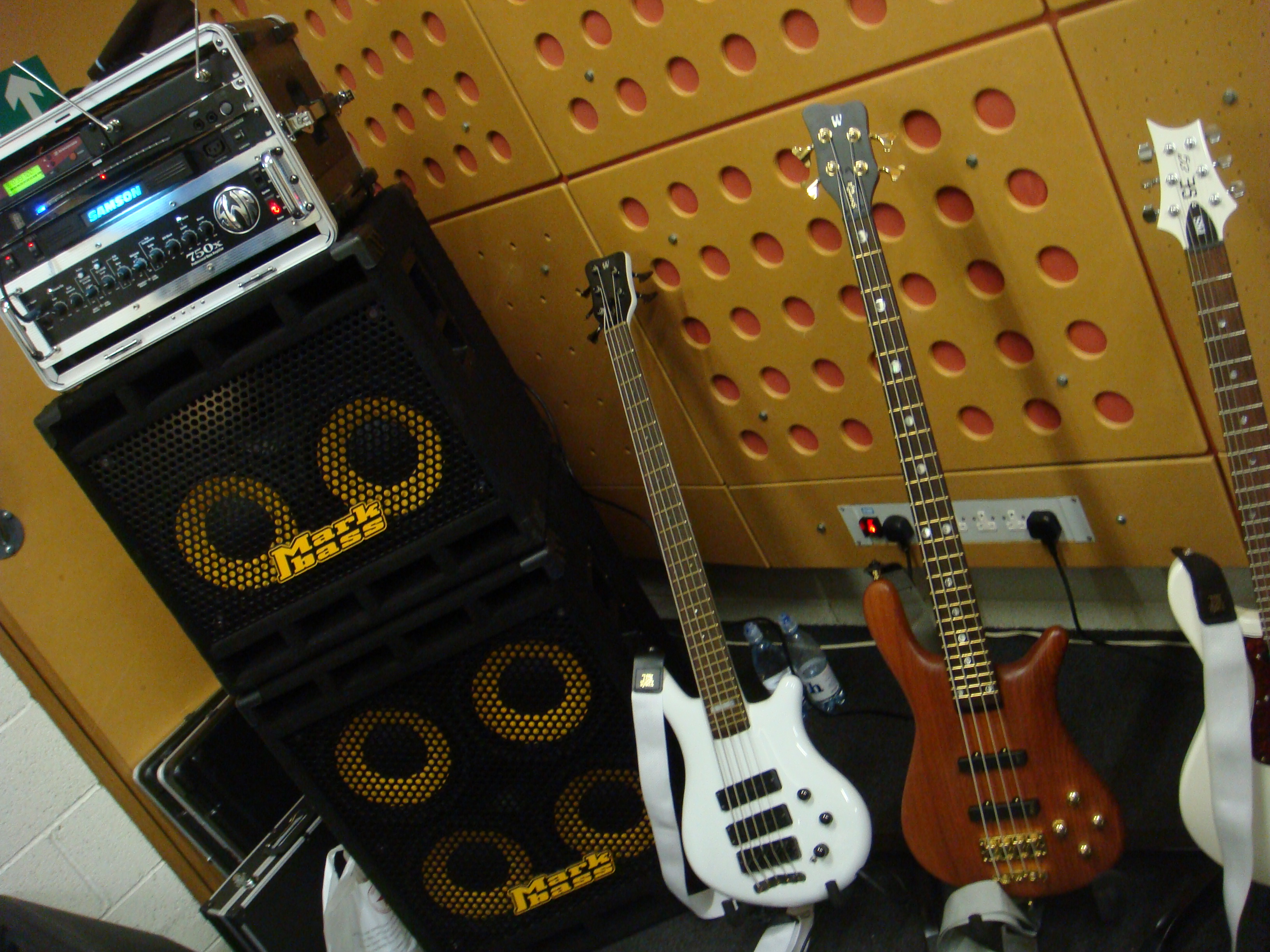
A bass stack consisting of an SWR amplifier head on top of Mark Bass 4x10" and 2x10" cabinets.

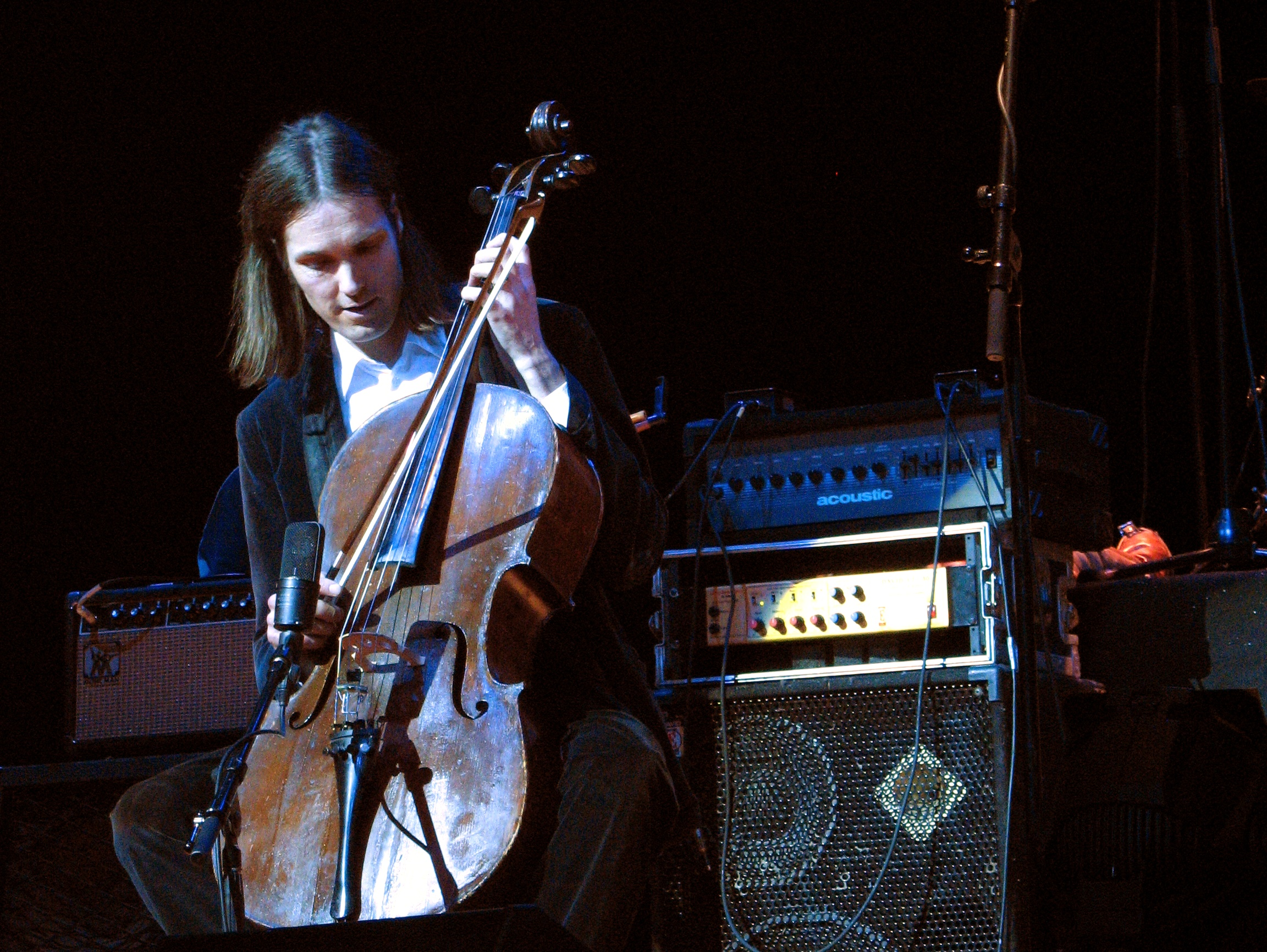
Don Kerr playing a cello through an Acoustic brand amplifier head.

==== Impedance ====
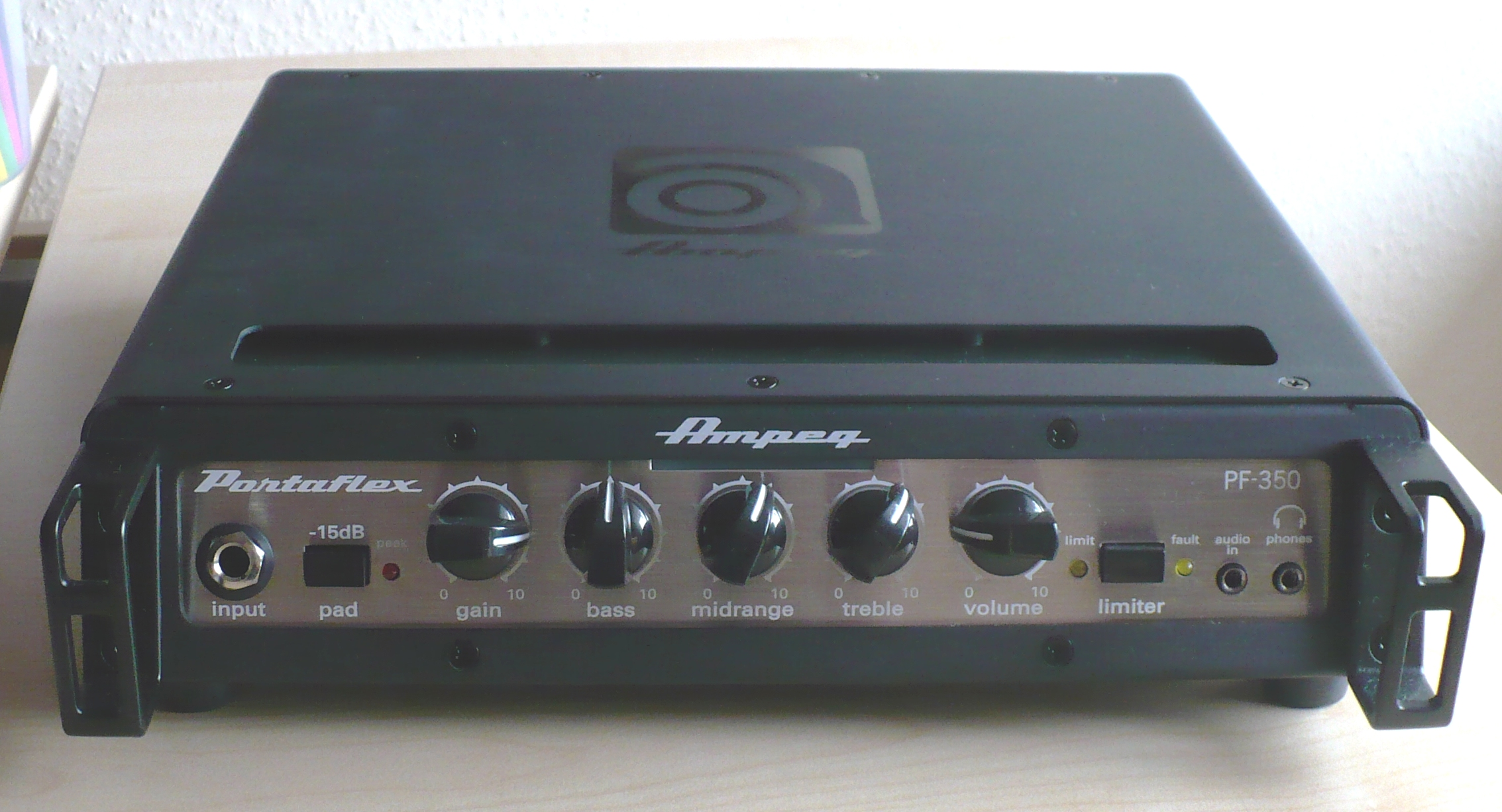
The Ampeg Portaflex is a small, lightweight, yet powerful bass amplifier head. It is small and light enough to be carried with one hand, yet powerful enough to run a large bass stack.

The power handling capabilities of a speaker cabinet or individual speaker are always given in relation to a specific impedance (a measure of electrical resistance); the most common impedance ratings in bass speaker systems are 8 ohms and 4 ohms, although some equipment is rated down to 2 ohms or even more rarely to 1 ohm.

==== Power supply ====
Most modern bass amps are powered solely by AC mains power. Inexpensive practice amps may have the AC mains plug hardwired into the unit. Middle-priced to high-priced amplifiers typically have a removable cable and plug, allowing simplified replacement.

Most amps are designed to work for a single voltage. A small number of expensive bass amps designed for touring professionals have user-selectable voltage, which enables a bassist to use same amp in both North America and across Europe.

A small number of small combo amps can run on both AC mains power and battery power. This enables bassists to play outside where there is no access to power (e.g., for busking on the street). Amps that are battery powered may have a 12-volt input, so that it can be connected to a car battery with alligator clips.

== Loudspeakers ==
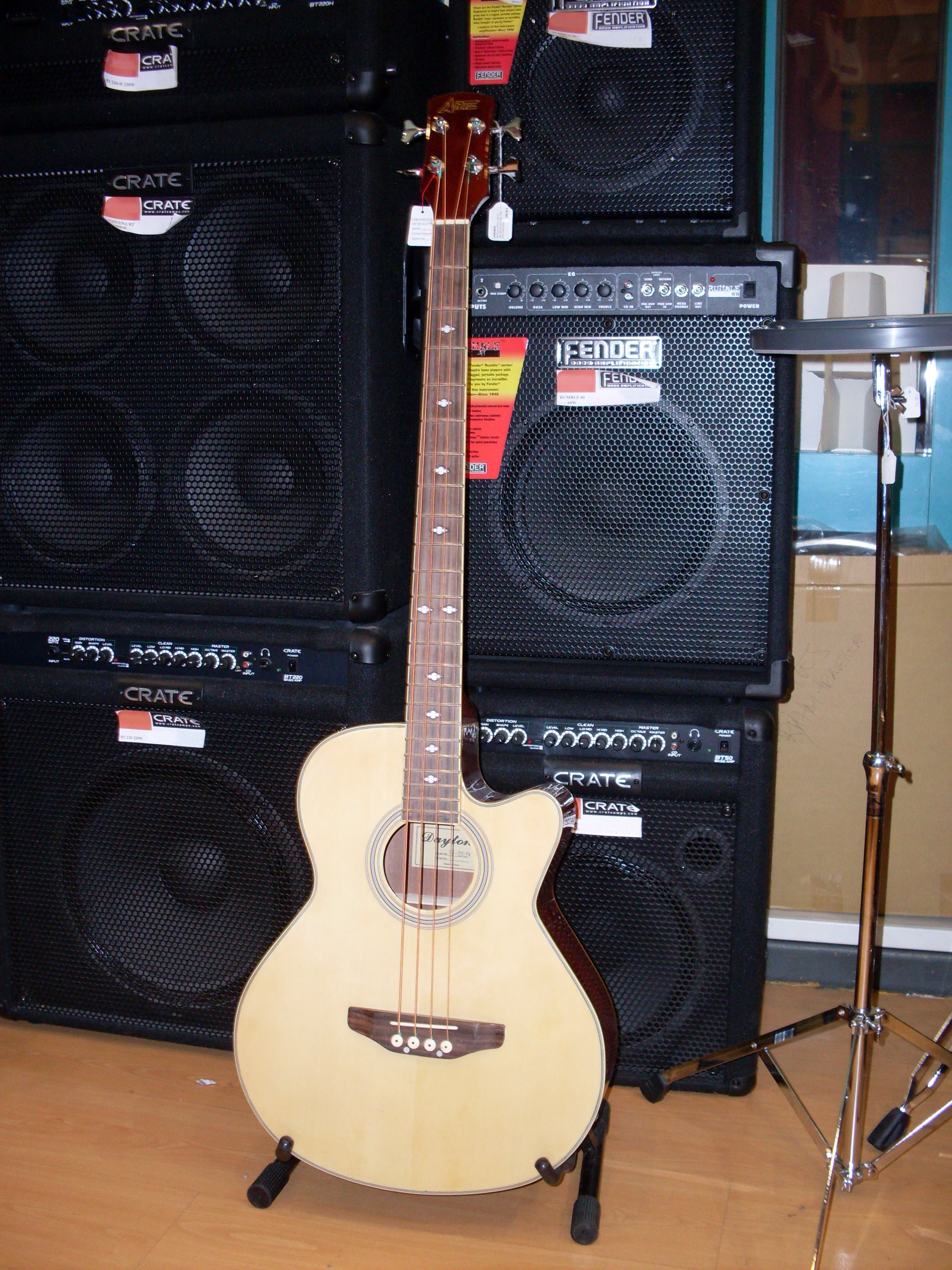
Music store display showing a variety of bass "combo" amplifiers and speaker cabinets.

The lowest note on the double bass or four-stringed electric bass is E1, two octaves below middle C (approximately 41 Hz), and on a five-string it is B0 (approximately 31 Hz). The requirement to reproduce low frequencies at high sound pressure levels means that most loudspeakers used for bass guitar amplification are designed around large diameter, heavy-duty drivers, with 10", 12" and 15" being most common. Less commonly, larger speakers (e.g., 18") or smaller speakers (e.g., the 8x8" cabinet, which contains eight 8" speakers) may be used. As a general rule, when smaller speakers are used, two or more of them are installed in a cabinet (e.g., 2x10", 4x10" and 8x8"). For 12" speakers, combo amps and cabinets are available with 1x12" and 2x12"; less commonly, 4x12" cabinets are seen. For 15" speakers, combo amps and cabinets usually have 1x15", although 2x15" and even 4x15" cabinets exist. A small number of 1x18" bass cabinets are sold (e.g., Trace Elliot).

For 10" speakers, the most common combo amp and speaker cabinet configurations are 2x10" and 4x10". For speaker cabinets, 2x10" and 4x10" are the most widely used, although 8x10" cabinets are used in stadium concerts, especially in louder rock genres. Other configurations with 10" speakers do exist, but they are less common. For example, there are a small number of 1x10" and 3x10" combo amps and speaker cabinets, and a small number of 6x10" cabinets. Bass speakers are usually made with stiff paper cones. Hartke combo amps and speaker cabinets are unique in that the cone is made from paper, except for the middle, which is made of aluminium. Gallien-Krueger's MB210-II combo amp uses ceramic speakers.

On the smaller end of the speaker spectrum, some small practice combo amps have 1x3", 2x5", 1x6.5", and 1x8" speakers.

Many manufacturers abbreviate the number and size of speakers in the name of their equipment. A cabinet with two 10" speakers may be called a "210".

Another abbreviation that is used is to add the wattage to the name, so a 500-watt Yamaha combo amp with two 12" speakers may be called the "Yamaha 212-500".

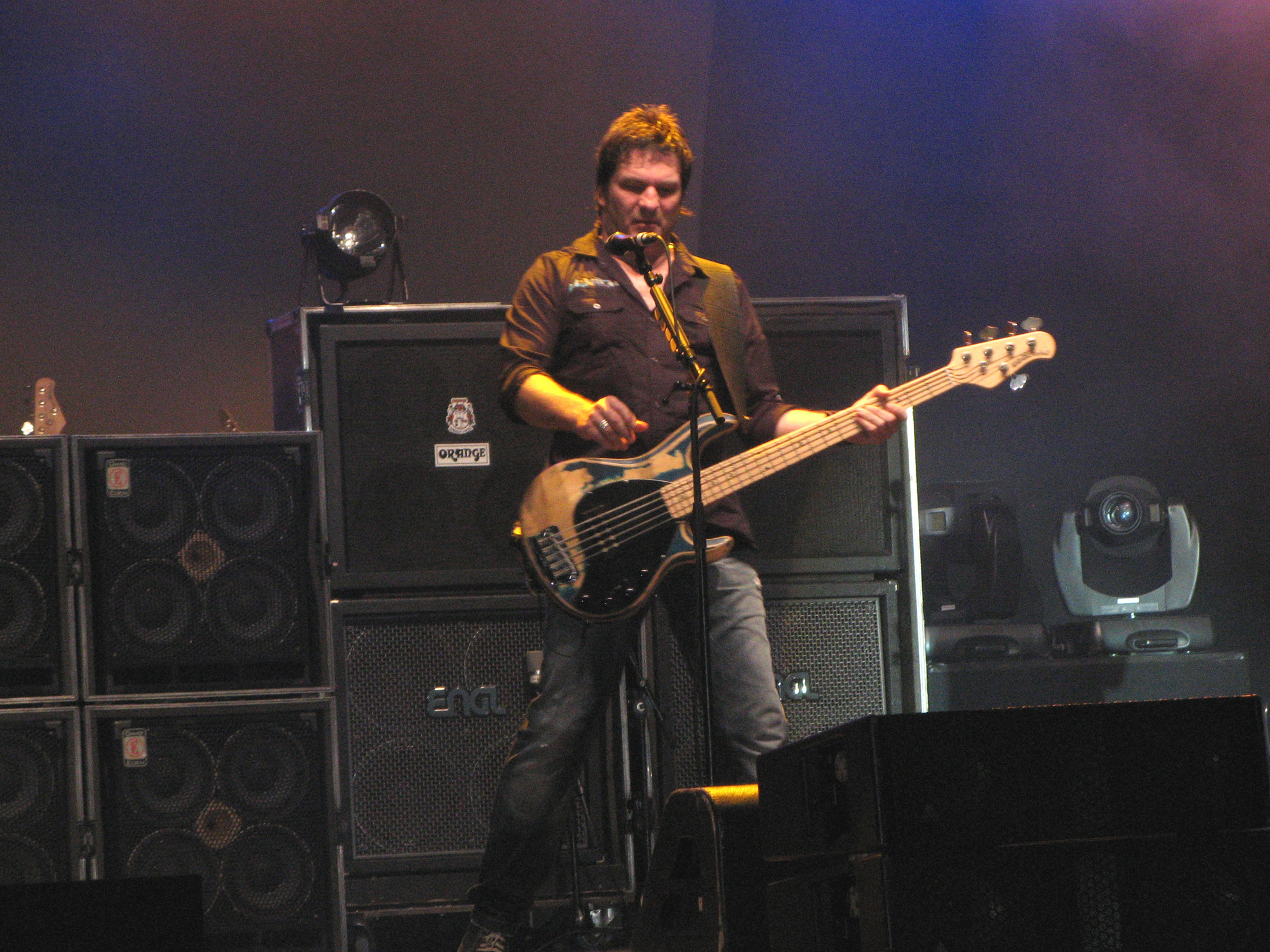
In some genres, bass players use a large number of speaker cabinets for a powerful onstage sound.

Bassists who want a more powerful low end may use a subwoofer cabinet. Subwoofers are specialized for very-low-frequency reproduction, with typical maximum useful high frequencies of about 150 or 200 Hz, so a subwoofer cabinet must be paired with a full range speaker cabinet to obtain the full tonal range of an electric bass or upright bass. Bass guitar players who use subwoofer cabinets include performers who play with extended range basses with include notes between B0 (about 31 Hz); and C#0 (17 Hz) and bassists whose style requires a very powerful sub-bass response is an important part of the sound (e.g., funk, Latin, gospel, R & B, etc.).

Keyboard players who use subwoofers for on-stage monitoring include electric organ players who use bass pedal keyboards (which go down to a low "C" which is about 33 Hz) and synth bass players who play rumbling sub-bass parts that go as low as 18 Hz. Of all of the keyboard instruments that are amplified onstage, synthesizers produce some of the lowest pitches because, unlike a traditional electric piano or electric organ which have as their lowest notes a low "A" and a low "C", respectively, a synth does not have a fixed lowest octave. While performers who use concert sound subwoofers for onstage monitoring may like the powerful sub-bass sound that they obtain, sound engineers may find this problematic, interfering with the "Front of House" sub-bass sound.

=== Cabinet design ===
It is generally not possible to combine high efficiency (especially at low frequencies) with both compact enclosure size and adequate low frequency response. In general, to maximize low-frequency performance, a larger cabinet size is needed.

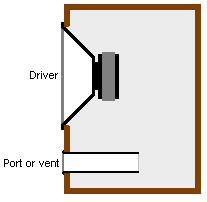
A bass reflex enclosure schematic (cross-section).

Most bass speaker cabinets employ a vented bass-reflex design, which uses a port or vent cut into the cabinet and a length of carefully measured tubing or pipe to increase the low-frequency response and improve the speaker system's efficiency.

Less commonly, some bass speaker cabinets use one or more passive radiator speakers, a "drone cone" lacking a voice coil, which is used in addition to a regular woofer to improve the low-frequency response of a cabinet. Passive radiator speakers help to reduce the risk of overextension.

Acoustic suspension designs with sealed cabinets are relatively uncommon because they are less efficient. Some cabinets use a transmission-line design similar to bass-reflex, and in rare cases, some large cabinets use horn-loading of the woofers (e.g., the Acoustic 361 18" speaker cabinet from the late 1960s).

Most bass combo amps and bass speaker cabinets are "front-firing," where the speakers and horn (if present) aim forward. However, because very-low-pitched sounds are omnidirectional, some combos and cabinets have woofers that point down or to the rear, as do many designs of home cinema subwoofer cabinets. The deep bass tone radiates from the cabinet in all directions.

Bass combo cabinets and speaker cabinets are typically cube- or rectangle shaped. Some small- to mid-sized combo amp cabinets have a wedge shape, like a keyboard amp or a stage monitor speaker cabinet. The wedge shape, also called a "rock back" feature, enables a bassist to point their speakers up towards themselves, to make it easier to hear their sound.

=== Tweeters ===
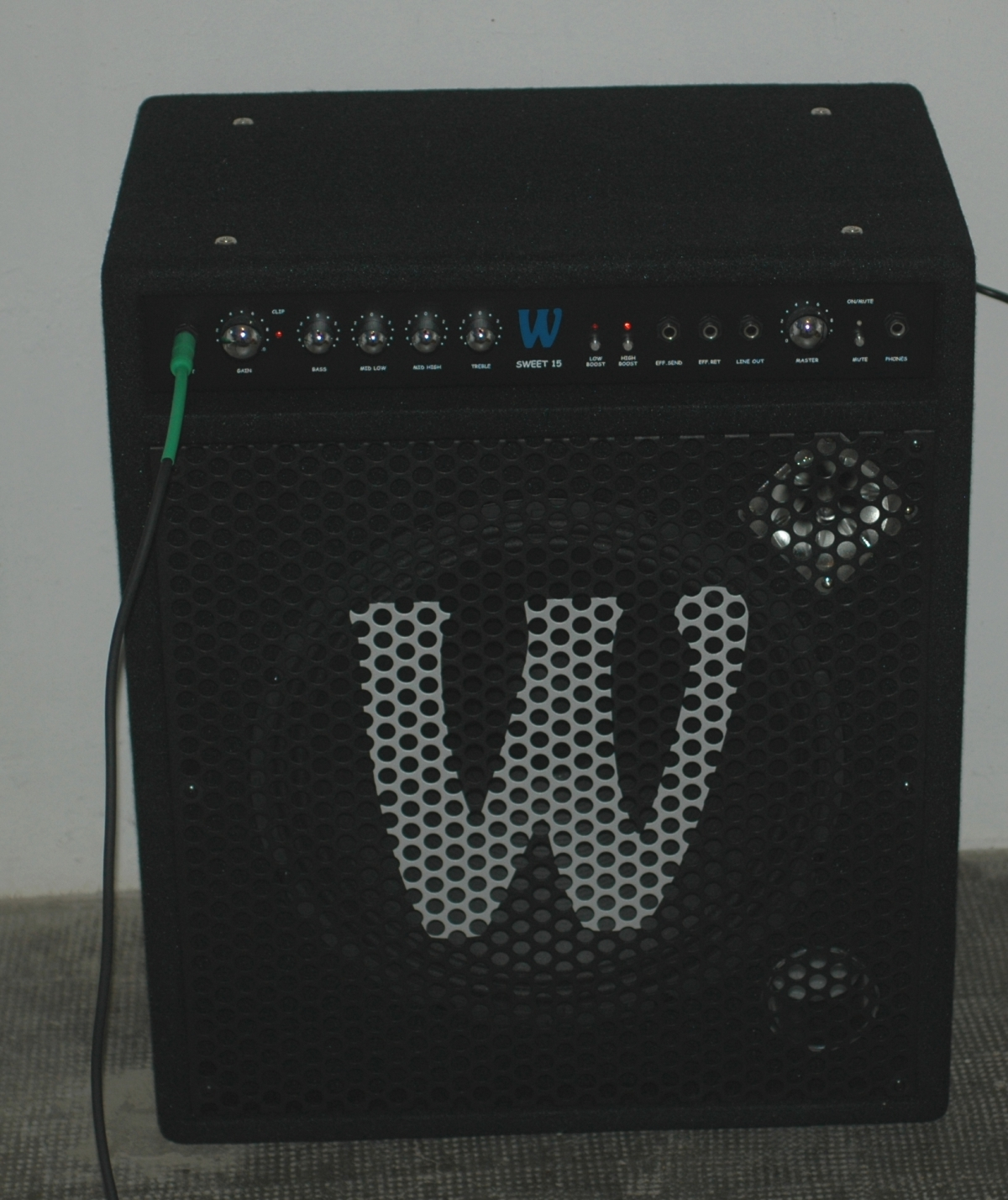
A 150-watt "combo" bass amp with a horn-loaded tweeter (in the top right of the speaker cabinet).

High frequency tweeters, typically horn-loaded, are included in some bass instrument speaker cabinets.

In the early 1980s, some performers began using two-way or three-way cabinets, with 15" woofers, a vented midrange driver and a horn/driver, with an audio crossover directing the signal to the appropriate driver. Folded-horn bass guitar rigs have remained rare due to their size and weight. As well, since the 1990s, most clubs have PA systems with subwoofers that can handle the low range of the bass guitar. The more common use of tweeters in traditional bass guitar amplifiers in the 1990s helped bassists to use effects and perform more soloistic playing styles, which emphasize the higher range of the instrument.

Horns and speakers in the same cabinet are sometimes wired separately, so that they can be driven by separate amplifiers. Biamplified systems and separately-wired cabinets allowed bassists to send an overdriven low-pitched sound to the speaker, and a crisp, undistorted high-pitched sound to the horn.

Since the 1960s, some bassists have obtained a similar result by plugging their bass into both an electric guitar guitar amp and a bass amp. This approach does not use a crossover, but since an electric guitar amp will only produce pitches down to about 80 Hz, the guitar amp reproduces the mid- to high frequencies and the bass amp reproduces the low frequencies. With this arrangement, distortion and other effects can be applied to the guitar amp without affecting the solidity of the bass amp tone.

Some bass amplifier combos have a "whizzer cone" attached to the low-frequency woofer's centre. The whizzer cone is about the same size as a dust cap, although it resembles a miniature speaker cone. This handles the upper frequencies that are too high for the woofer.

== Controls, jacks, and indicator LEDs ==
=== Controls ===
The controls for a rackmount bass amp "head", the Hevos400D.

There are two main types of controls on bass amps: switches and rotary knobs. The simplest, least expensive practice amps and combo amps may only have a few switches and knobs, such as an "on/off" switch, a volume knob, and a bass and treble control knob. Mid-priced models may add additional tone controls (e.g., one, two or three "midrange" controls and a "presence" knob for very high frequencies) and/or add a second type of volume knob called a "gain", "preamplifier" (or "preamp"/"pre"), or "drive" (short for "overdrive") control. A good selection of equalizer knobs and gain stages is standard on expensive amplifiers. If an amp has one or more preamp or gain knobs, the second volume knob may be called "master", "volume" or "post".

Amplifiers for electric guitars are more likely than bass amps to have multiple "channels", but some bass amps also have channels. By providing two or more "channels", each with its own gain, equalization and volume knobs, a bassist can preset various settings (e.g., an accompaniment setting for playing a backing part and a solo bass setting for playing a bass solo). In a heavy metal band, a bassist may use a multi-channel amp to have one setting with an aggressive overdrive, while another channel has a "clean" sound for ballads.

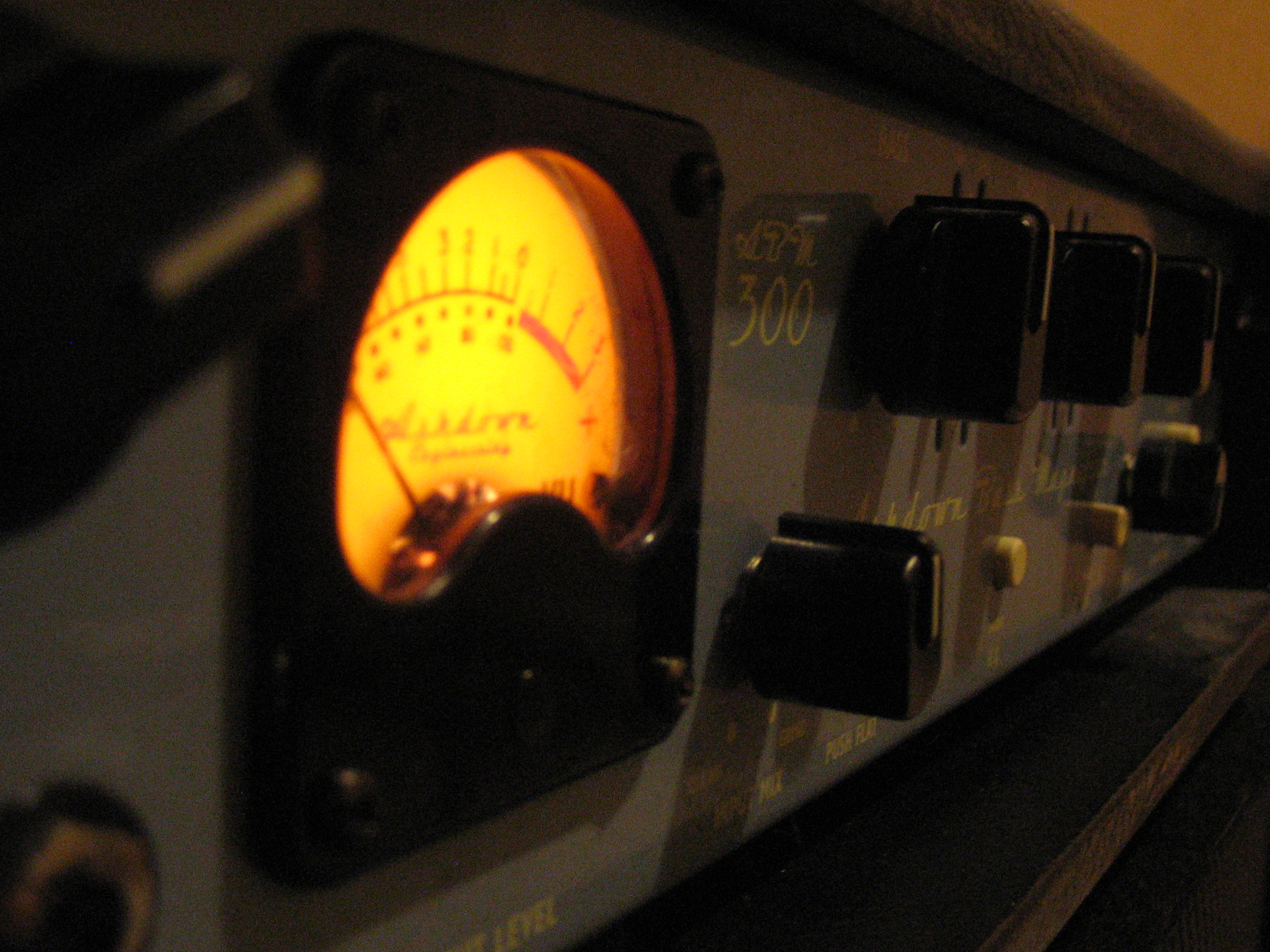
An unusual feature on Ashdown bass amps is a VU meter with a needle, which indicates input signal levels (pictured is the Ashdown ABM-300).

On some amps, setting the "gain" or "drive" control above a certain setting causes an overdrive effect, either due to the natural effect of overloading the preamplifier (or the preamp tube on a tube amplifier) and/or due to a distortion effect being turned on. Tube amplifiers typically also have a "standby" switch in addition to an "on/off" switch. Controls are typically mounted on the front of the amplifier near the top of the cabinet; often the knobs are recessed so that they do not project beyond the wooden cabinet, to protect the knobs during transportation. On amplifier "heads", protective metal U-shaped protrusions may be used to protect the knobs during transportation. On some amps, notably Roland models, the knobs and switches may be on top of the amplifier, at the rear of the top surface. Again, the knobs are usually recessed below the top of the wooden cabinet to protect them.

Mid-to high-priced amps may have other switches (which on some amps are switched on by pulling an existing rotary knob out) that boost or cut some part of the frequency range, such as "bright boost", "deep boost" or "mid scoop" switches. Amps with an onboard audio compressor or limiter, which is used to protect the speakers from sudden peaks in volume and from damage due to power amplifier clipping, may have only an on/off switch to turn on the effect (as with lower- to mid-priced amps), or they may have one or more knobs to control how much compression is applied to the bass tone (typically a ratio and threshold knob or just a single knob). Some 2000s-era amps may have an electronic tuner and a mute button, to mute the sound of tuning during a break between songs without having to change the volume settings. On some amps, vertical sliders may be provided to control a graphic equalizer, which gives the bassist control over a number of frequency bands.

Higher-cost amps for professionals with an XLR DI out jack may also have a "ground lift" switch (to be used in case of a humming ground loop), a DI out level control knob, and a switch which determines whether the DI out signal to the PA or recording mixing board is pre- or post- the amp's internal preamplifier and equalization circuitry. The pre-/post- switch enables a bassist to decide whether to send the audio engineer just the signal from her bass, or to send the signal once it has been pre-amped and equalized by her amp settings. Some higher-cost amps may have a parametric equalizer (or a semi-parametric equalizer) for some frequency ranges (typically the middle frequency range), which can be used to modify the bass tone to suit different styles or performance venues. Some bass amps have a 15 or 20 dB pad which can be used to attenuate "hot" signals, such as basses with an internal preamplifier (depending on the model of amplifier, some brands may provide two inputs (high and low gain) instead of providing a "pad". This pad can be turned on using a button. Some bass amps have an even stronger pad, a 40 dB pad.

Some bass amps may have additional controls for onboard effects such as bass chorus or a knob for controlling a multi-effects unit (which might include a suboctave generator, chorus, reverb, fuzz bass etc.). Some 2000s-era amps may have a knob to control digital amp or speaker emulation settings (e.g., emulating the tone of a huge 8x10" speaker stack or a vintage tube amp by famous makers, such as the Ampeg SVT).

=== Input and output jacks ===
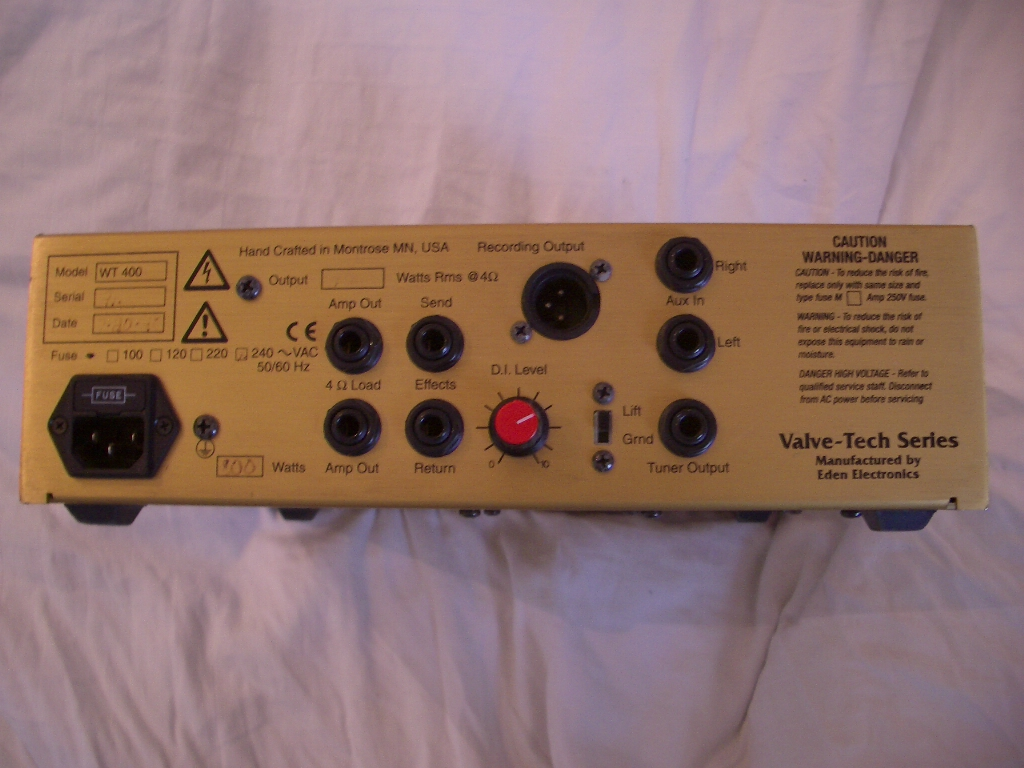
This rear view of an Eden WT-400 Traveler Plus amp head shows a 1/4" speaker output, a 1/4" signal out (to plug into a second amp, if needed), a "send" and "return" jack for creating an effects loop, a DI output, auxiliary left and right inputs and a tuner out jack.

Bass amps come with a range of different input and output jacks, depending on the cost of the amplifier and its intended purpose. The least expensive practice amps may only have a single 1/4" input jack and no output jacks. Some practice amps and small combo amps have RCA or 1/8" inputs for plugging an MP3 player or CD player into the bass amp, to facilitate practicing with a recording. Some amps have a high-gain input, for basses which have internal preamplifiers on the instrument. The high-gain input is routed through a pad (attenuator). An amp may also have a low-gain input, which is unattenuated, for regular basses.

Lower-priced amps may have a preamp out. Bass amps intended for use by professional players may have an XLR DI output so that the amp can be connected directly to a mixing board of a PA system or recording set-up. Some bass amps have a 1/4" headphone out jack, so that the bass amp can be used for silent practice. When the headphone is plugged in, the amplifier to the speaker is normally automatically turned off. Higher-priced amps designed for professionals often have "preamp out" and "power amp in" jacks, which can be used to make an effects loop. The power amp in jack can also be used to plug in an external preamplifier pedal, which would then bypass the amp's onboard preamp and EQ section.

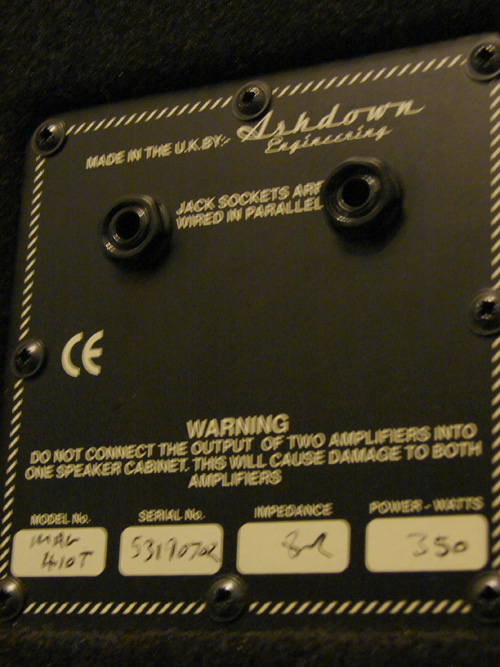
The rear jack plate of an Ashdown 4x10" speaker cabinet shows the parallel speaker cable jacks that are usually provided on speaker cabs.

Some bass amps have an auxiliary in jack, for plugging in a drum machine, keyboard bass or synthesizer. Some bass amps also have an external speaker out jack.

On some amps with a number of input and output jacks, the jacks may be consolidated in a patch bay. Some amps have an input jack for a foot-operated switch which can be used to turn on an effect or switch to a solo channel. Some amplifiers have a "tuner out" jack, for sending the instrument signal to an external electronic tuner.

Bass speaker cabinets often have two 1/4" jacks. These are provided so that one speaker cable can be plugged into the first jack and connected to the power amp; if the bassist wants to use a second cabinet, a second speaker cable is plugged into the second jack and then into second speaker.

A small number of bass amps designed for the upright bass have both a 1/4" input for a piezoelectric pickup and an XLR input for a condenser microphone mounted on the bass, with a simple mixer for combining the two signals, as described below.

=== Indicator LEDs ===
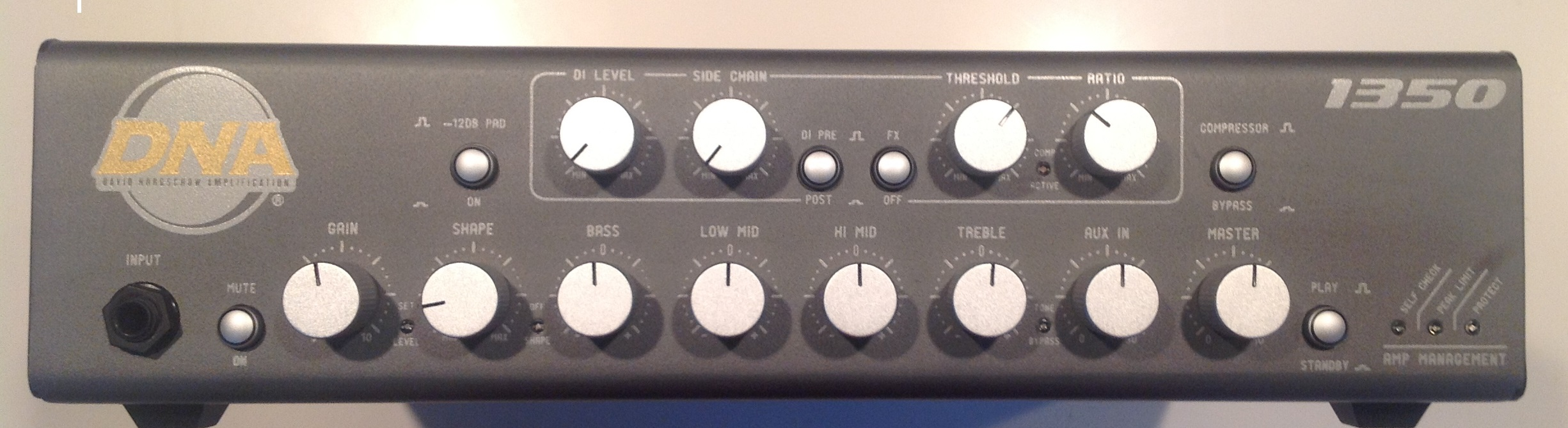
A DNA-1350 amp head; note the three indicator LEDs on the right-hand side, indicating amplifier status.

The least expensive practice amps and basic combo amps may only have a single indicator light: an LED to indicate when the amp's power is on.

More expensive amps may also have LEDs to indicate when the preamp has a signal present from the instrument; when a limiter or similar speaker protection feature is activated; when clipping is occurring; or when the amp is in standby mode.

== Amplifying the double bass ==
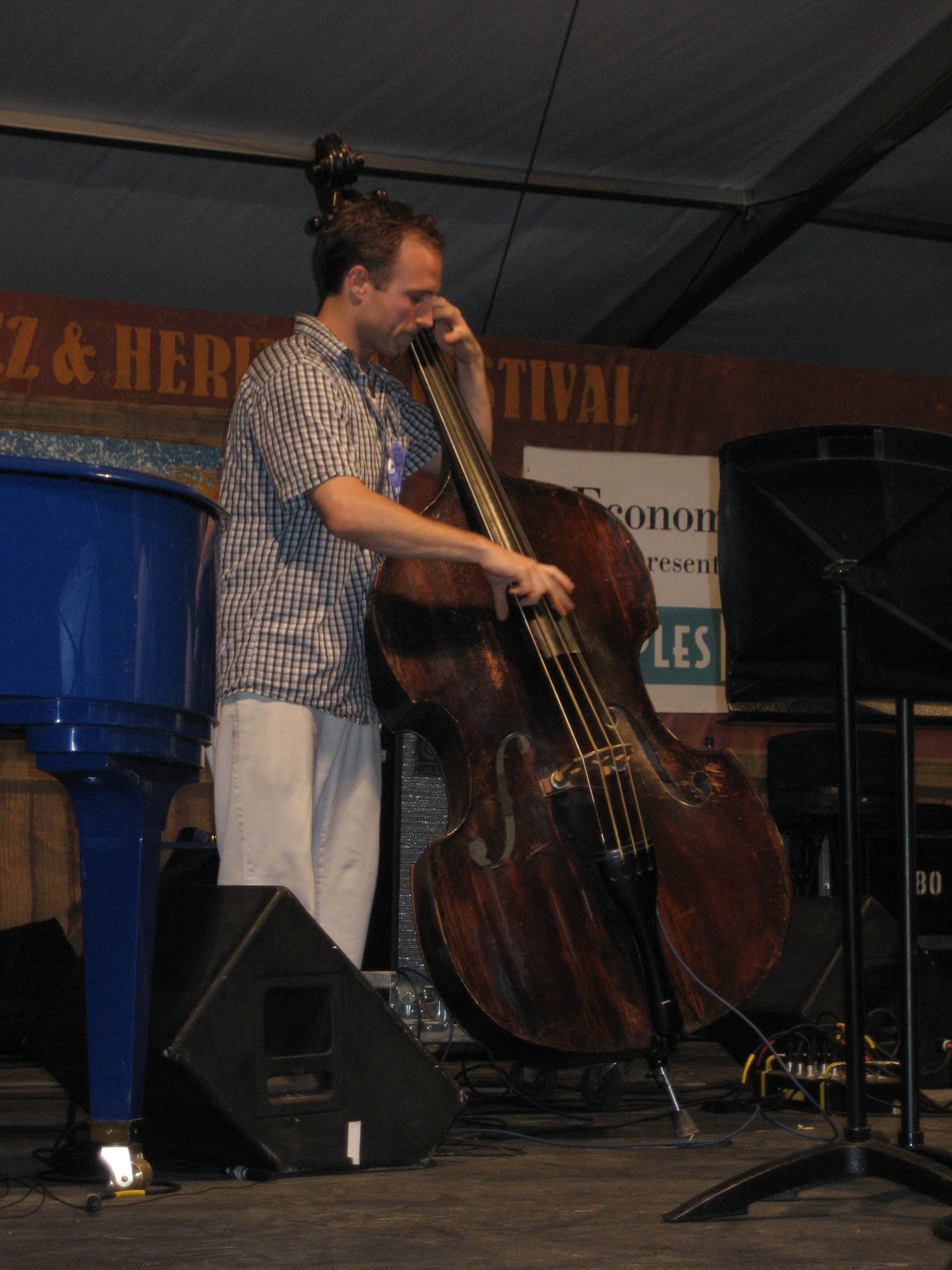
A jazz bassist performing on an upright bass, using an amplifier and speaker to augment the instrument's natural volume

Almost all bass amplifiers are designed for use with an electric bass, which has magnetic pickups. The signal from a double bass usually comes from a piezoelectric pickup mounted on the bridge or beneath the feet of the bridge. These pickups require a preamplifier or preamp-equipped DI box before the signal is sent to the bass amp. The preamplifier helps to ensure that the impedance of the pickup signal matches the impedance of the amplifier, which improves the tone. Some preamplifiers also have equalizers which can be used to modify the tone.

Double bass players performing in genres where the bass is slapped, either by pulling the string until it snaps back onto the fingerboard or striking the strings, such as traditional blues, rockabilly, psychobilly jazz, folk, and bluegrass often blend the sounds picked up by a piezoelectric transducer with the sounds picked up by a small condenser microphone mounted on the bridge. The microphone picks up the resonance coming from the body and the sounds of the strings being plucked, bowed, or slapped. The two sound signals are blended using a simple mixer and then routed to the amplifier.

While many upright bass players use combo amplifiers, bassists in genres that use high stage volume, such as the punk-rockabilly genre of psychobilly use "bass stacks". Some jazz bassists and other bass players who play in small venues use specialized, expensive upright bass amps, like the Acoustic Image combo amplifier.

Double bass players playing in genres where a louder amplified tone (emphasizing the fundamental frequencies) is desired may encounter audio feedback. Feedback for double bass generally manifests itself as a sharp, sudden high-volume "howling" sound that can damage loudspeakers. When acoustic instruments with resonant bodies are amplified with microphones and piezoelectric transducer pickups, they are prone to have feedback problems. For acoustic bass guitars, soft plastic discs are available to block the instrument's sound holes, thus reducing feedback. Upright bass players sometimes use homemade foam inserts to fill in the "f" holes.

== Preamplification and effects ==
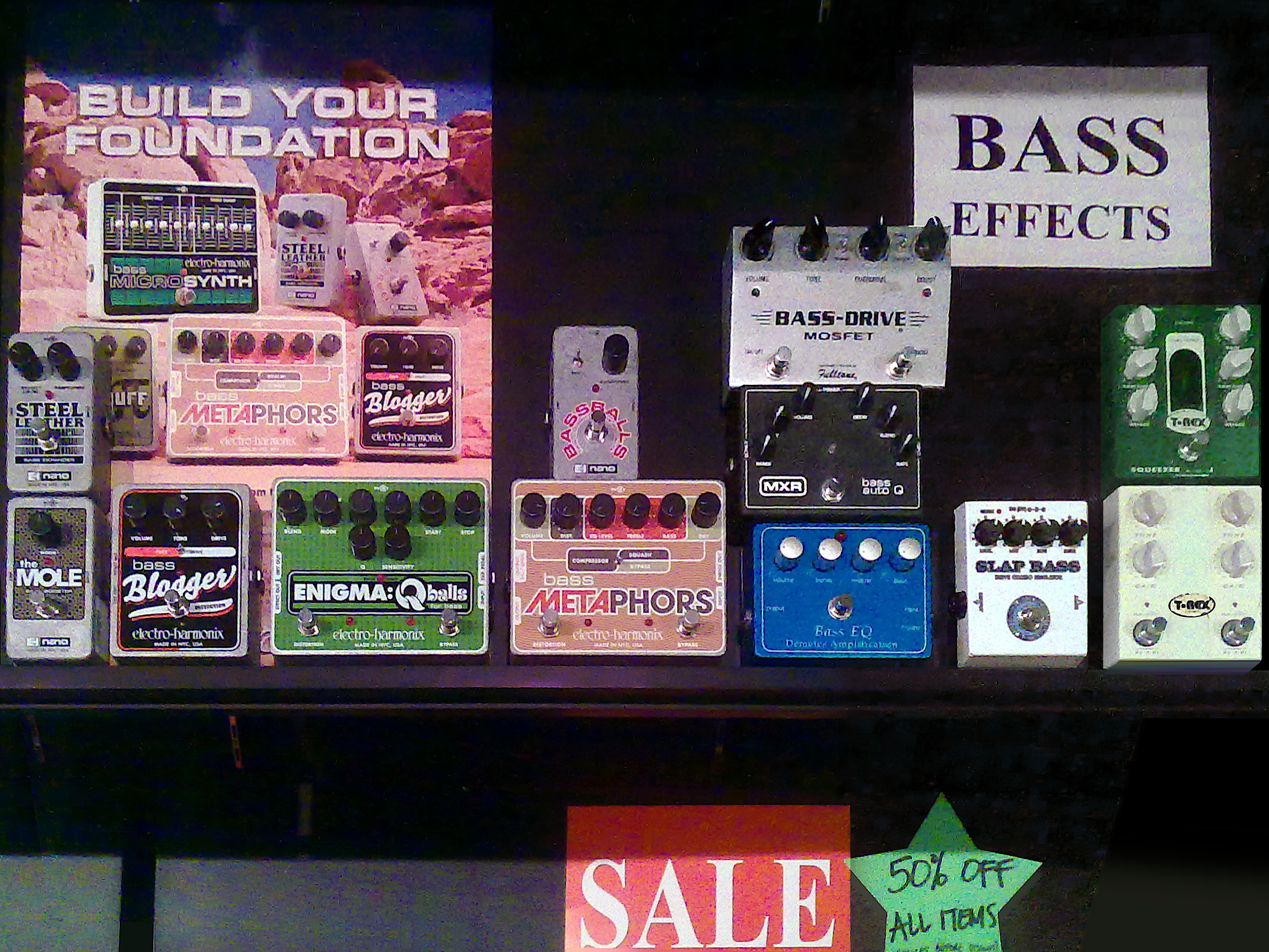
A selection of bass effect pedals at a music store.

The basic sound of the amplified electric bass or double bass can be modified by electronic bass effects. Since the bass typically plays an accompaniment, beat keeping role as a rhythm section instrument in many styles of music, preamplifiers ("preamps"), compression, limiters, and equalization (modifying the bass and treble frequencies) are the most widely used effect units for bass. The types of pedals commonly used for electric guitar (distortion, phaser, flanger, etc.) are less commonly used for bass, at least in bands or styles where the bassist mainly plays a rhythm section role. In styles of music where the bass is also used as a soloing instrument (certain genres of heavy metal, progressive rock and jazz fusion), bassists may use a wider range of effects units. Jazz fusion bassists who play fretless bass may use chorus effect and reverb for their solos.

A range of other effects are used in various genres. "Wah-wah" and "synth" bass effects are associated with funk music. As well, since the 1960s and 1970s, bands have experimented with "fuzz bass" where the bass is distorted either by overdriving the amp or by using a distortion unit. Fuzz bass was used by psychedelic rock bands in the 1960s and early 1970s and in traditional heavy metal bands during the same era. Octave-generating effects, which generate an octave below the pitch being played are also used by bass players. Many bassists in modern-day hard rock and heavy metal bands use overdrive pedals specifically made for bass guitar. Since the late 1980s, bass-specific overdrive pedals have been available; these pedals maintain the low fundamental pitch. Using a regular guitar distortion pedal for bass would result in the lower frequencies being greatly lessened. Well-known overdrive effects for bass include the BOSS ODB-3 Bass Overdrive, Electro-Harmonix Bass Blogger, Tech21 Sansamp Bass Driver, the DigiTech XBD Bass Driver, and the Electro-Harmonix Big Muff.

=== Overdrive built into amplifiers ===
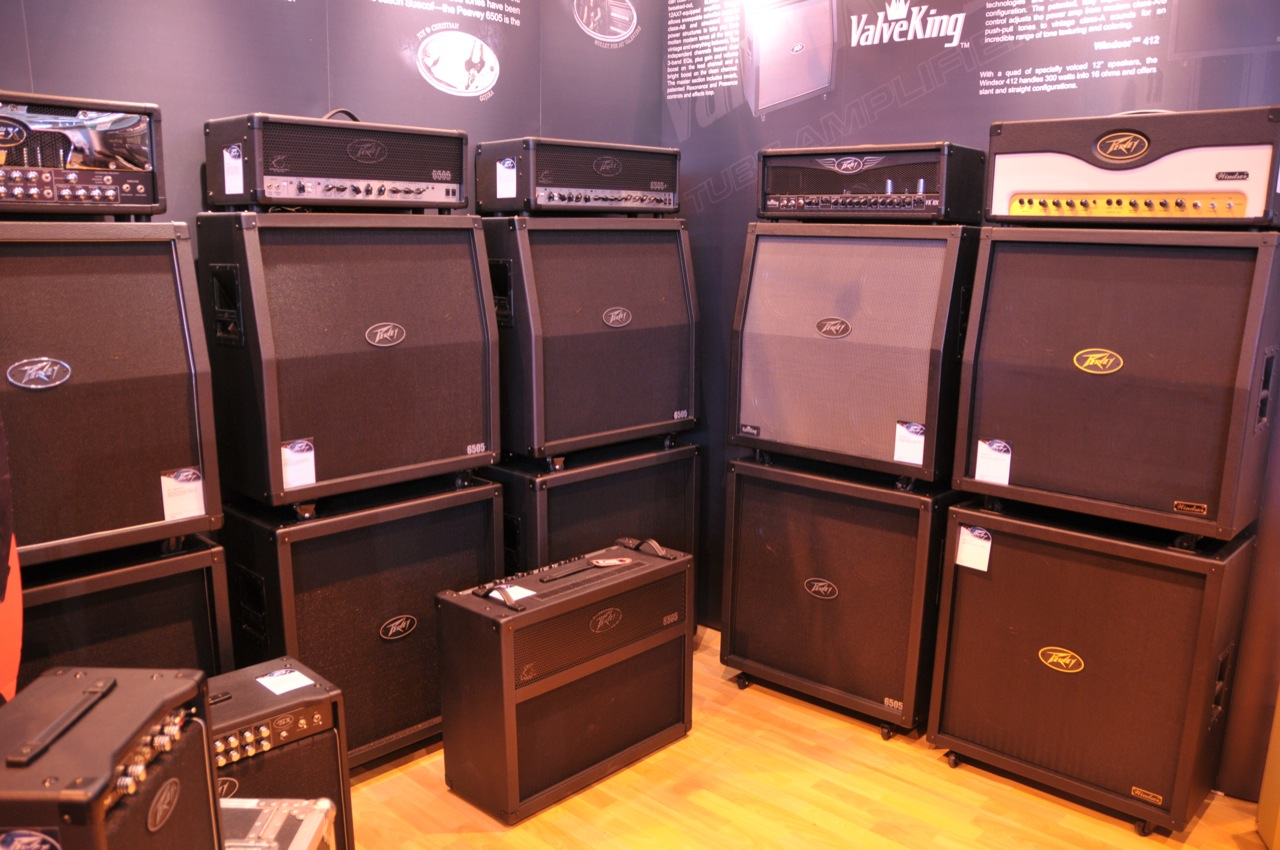
Over the years, various Peavey bass amplifiers have had built-in distortion effects.

Some bass amplifiers have an "overdrive" or distortion effect built into the unit. The Peavey Century 200 has an onboard "distortion" effect on the second channel. The Peavey VB-2 also has built-in overdrive. Aguilar Amplification's AG 500 bass head is a two-channel amplifier, one of which offers a "saturation" control for overdrive. A variety of BOSS combo amplifiers have a built-in "drive" effect. Gallien-Krueger's bass amp heads have a "boost" control which provides a simulated tube overdrive effect. The Behringer Ultrabass BVT5500H Bass Amplifier Head has a built-in limiter and overdrive. The LowDown LD 150 bass amp has a range of overdrive sounds, from a slight hint to heavy distortion. The CUBE-20XL BASS amp includes built-in overdrive.

The 75 Watt Fender Rumble 75 Bass Combo Amp and its 150 Watt and 300 Watt counterparts can produce an overdrive effect by using the gain and blend controls, giving overdrive sounds ranging from "mellow warmth [to] heavy distorted tones". The Fender SuperBassman is a 300-watt tube head which has a built-in overdrive channel. The Fender Bronco 40 includes a range of effects including modern bass overdrive, vintage overdrive and fuzz.

Lemmy Kilmister, the bassist for Motörhead, obtained a natural fuzz bass tone by overdriving his triple 100 watt Marshall Bass stacks.

The MESA Bigblock 750 has a built-in overdrive channel. The Mesa M2000 has a high gain switch which can be engaged with a footswitch. The Marshall MB450 head and combo bass amplifiers have a tube pre-amp on the "Classic" channel which can be overdriven. The Ashdown ABM 500 EVO III 575W Bass amp head has a built-in overdrive effect. Overdrive is also available on many Crate bass amplifiers. The Yamaha BBT500H has three types of built-in drive effects: overdrive, distortion and fuzz. The Ampeg B5R Bass Amplifier has two channels: clean and overdrive, with the ability to combine the two. Verellen, a boutique amp company, produces a bass amplifier with a built in overdrive channel.

== Manufacturers ==
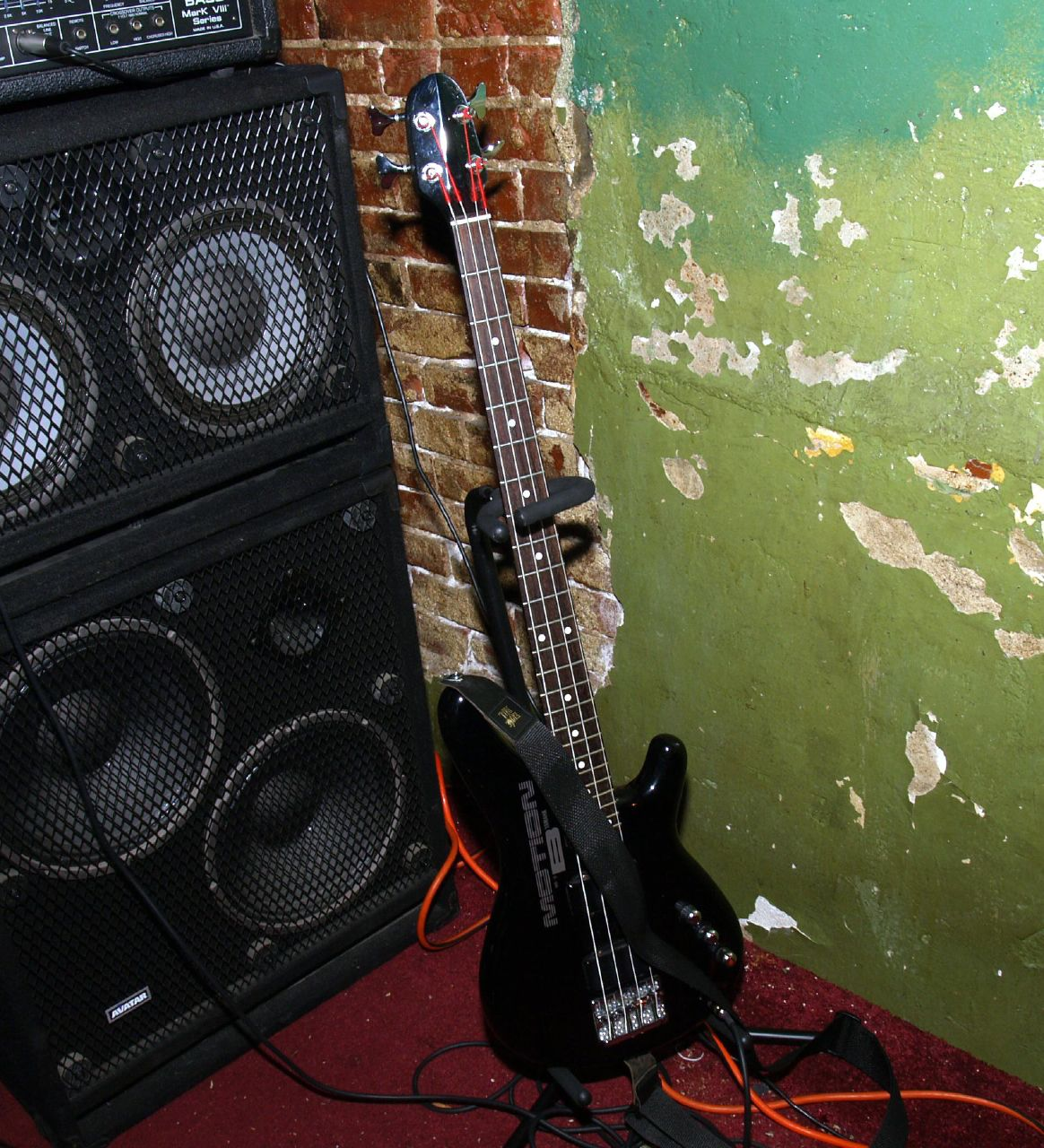
A bass amp head used with two speaker cabs, with each cabinet containing two loudspeakers and a high frequency horn.

Bass amplifier equipment manufacturers include a variety of different types of companies, ranging from companies that only make individual components to companies that only make bass amplifiers and loudspeakers (e.g., Gallien-Krueger). At the other end of the spectrum are companies that offer bass amplification equipment as part of a much broader offering of different types of instrument amplifiers and public address systems (e.g., Peavey, Carvin A&I or Yorkville Sound.)

Another way of categorizing bass equipment manufacturers is by which part of the market they are targeting. While Peavey and Yorkville products are aimed at the generalist mass market, some bass equipment manufacturers, such as Acoustic Image or Walter Woods make expensive "boutique" equipment that is aimed at a niche market within the professional musician market. Acoustic Image amplifiers and speaker cabinets tend to be used by professional acoustic folk and jazz musicians, and Walter Woods amplifiers are associated with professional acoustic jazz bass players.

== Alternatives ==
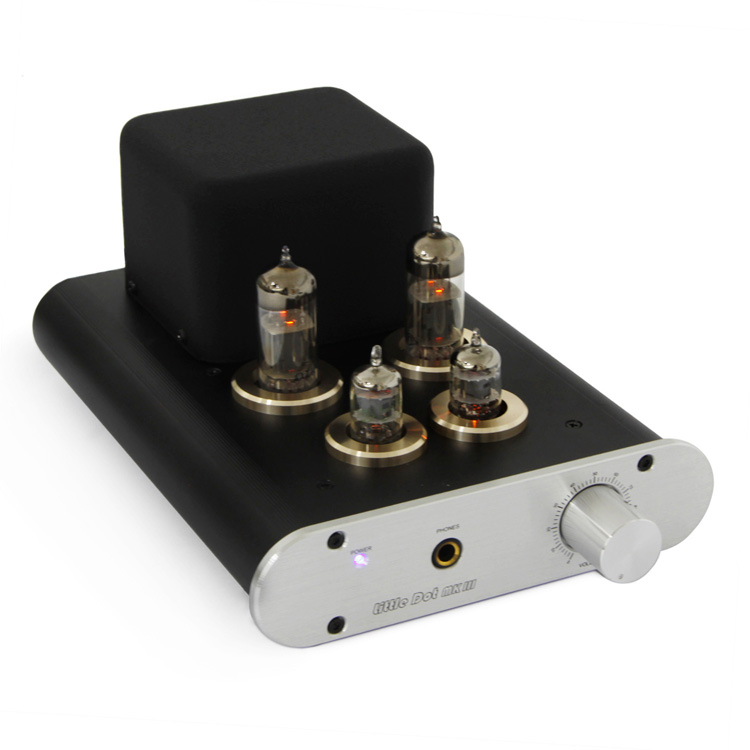
A Little Dot Mk III tube headphone amplifier.

Some bass players cannot use a bass combo amp, either due to strict noise and disturbance rules in their apartment, lack of space to store a combo amp (if they live in a small room) or due to the need for a set-up which can amplify multiple types of instruments and/or voice. Alternatives to buying a bass amp for people who have noise or space constraints include a headphone amplifier or a micro-practice amp which includes a headphone jack (on bass amps, connecting headphones to a headphone jack automatically turns off the main loudspeaker). Multi-instrumentalists and bassist-singers can consider a keyboard amplifier, a small PA system, or some models of acoustic instrument amplifiers which include bass as one of the instruments which can be used; all of these options have full-range speakers that can handle the bass range.

While electric bass players have used regular guitar amplifiers in large concerts since the 1960s, this is usually just for the higher register; a bass amp is still typically used for the low register, because regular guitar amps are only designed to go down to about 80 Hz. One of the reasons bassists split their signal into a bass amp and an electric guitar amp is because this arrangement enables them to overdrive the higher-register sound from the electric guitar amp, while retaining the deep bass tone from the bass amp. Naturally-produced overdrive on bass obtained by cranking a tube amplifier or solid-state preamplifier typically results in a loss of bass tone, because when pushed into overdrive, a note goes to the upper octave second harmonic.

Bass players who do not have a combo amp who are playing live shows can connect their bass to a DI unit and from there to the PA system. In a well-equipped nightclub or music bar, the audio engineer can then route the bass signal to a stage monitor suitable for bass, so the bass player and band can hear the bass tone. Some standalone bass preamplifier pedals have a DI output, so this output can similarly be connected to a PA system. Bass players who are playing in small venues (coffeehouses, small pubs, etc.) will typically need to bring their own bass combo amp (or an alternative amp, such as a keyboard amp combo), because very small venues often have a very small, low-powered PA system which is used mainly for vocals. Some small venues do not have monitor speakers, or they have only one, in front of the lead vocalist. Bass players who do not have a combo amp who are laying down tracks in the recording studio can plug into a DI unit (any professional recording studio will have one), which is connected to the audio console; the audio engineer can provide the bassist with the sound of their instrument through headphones.

== See also ==
- Bass effects
- Guitar effects
- Instrument amplifier
- Guitar amplifier
- Guitar speaker
- Isolation cabinet (guitar)
- List of bass amplifier and loudspeaker manufacturers
