= Bass effects =

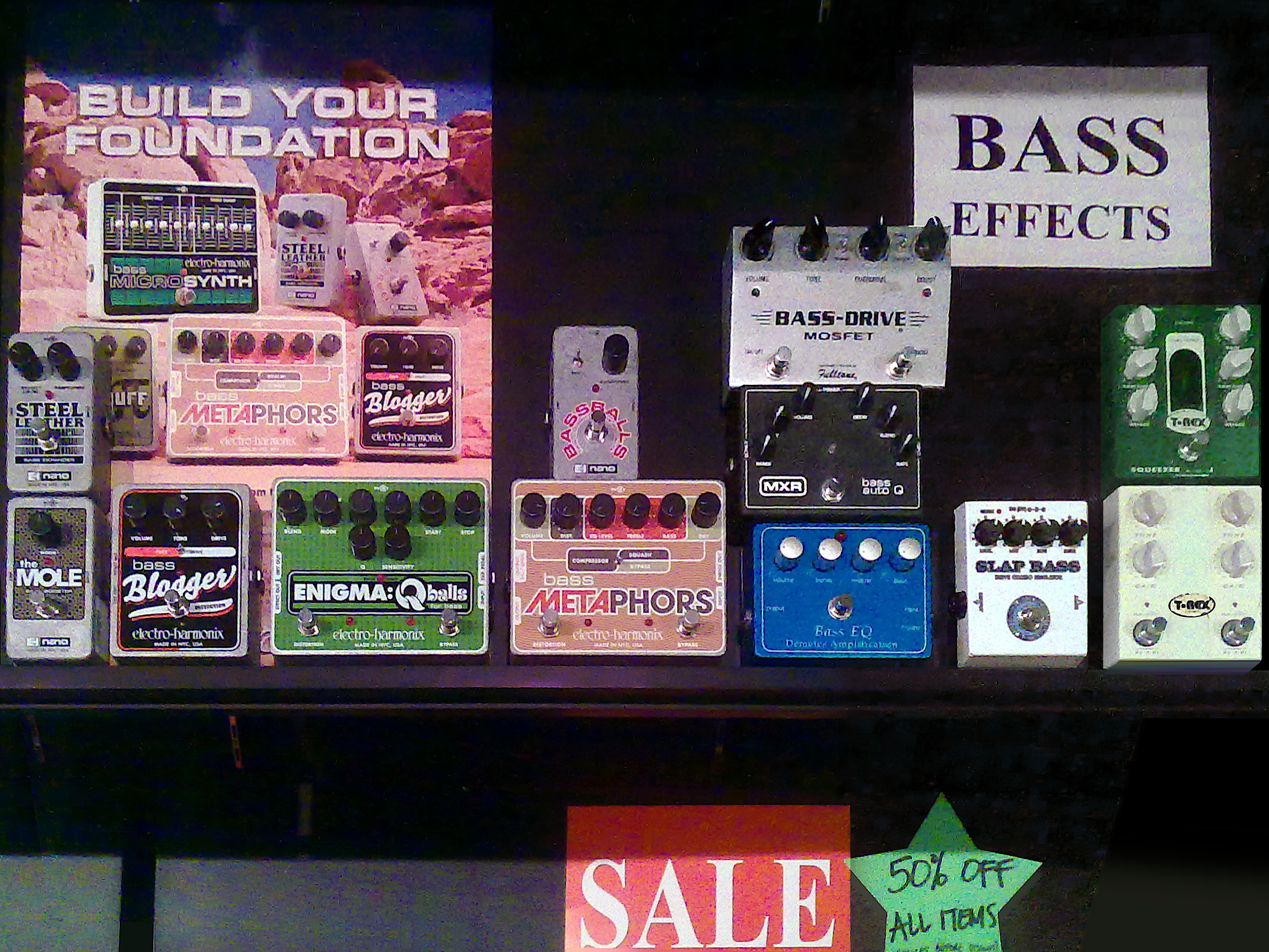
A selection of bass effect pedals at a music store.

Bass effects are electronic effects units that are designed for use with an electric bass and a bass amplifier, or for an upright bass and a bass amp or PA system. Bass effects are commonly available in stompbox-style pedals, which are metal or plastic boxes with a foot-operated pedal switch or button which turns the effect on and off. Most pedals also have knobs to control the tone, volume and effect level. Some bass effects are available in 19" rackmount units, which can be mounted in a road case. As well, some bass amplifiers have built-in effects, such as compression, overdrive or chorus. Darkglass Electronics is one notable example of a manufacturer specifically tailored towards bass players.

== Fuzz ==
By the mid- to late-1960s, some bands listed "fuzz bass" in addition to "electric bass" on their album credits. Album or performance credits for fuzz bass can be found from every decade since.

In the 1960s and early 1970s fuzz bass was associated with psychedelic music, progressive rock, and psychedelic soul/funk styles. Created by a small and usually simple electronic circuit, fuzz bass tended to be a "warmer", "smoother", and "softer" overdrive-type sound caused by soft, symmetrical clipping of the audio signal which "round[ed] off the signal peaks" them and filtered out the harsher high harmonics.

In the 1990s and 2000s, fuzz bass was also used by indie and alternative rock bands.

== Overdrive and distortion ==
Demonstration of the overdrive effect on a 6 string bass with a Darkglass pedal.

Overdriving a bass signal significantly changes the timbre, adds overtones (harmonics), and increases the sustain.

In the 1980s and 1990s, overdriven bass was associated with hardcore punk, death metal, grindcore and Industrial bands.

Bass distortion is generally achieved by hard clipping of the bass signal, which leaves in "harsher high harmonics that can result in sounds that are heard as jagged and spikey."

Since the late 1980s, manufacturers have produced overdrive pedals specifically designed for the electric bass, which often maintain the fundamental "dry" signal mixed with the overdriven tone.

== Chorus ==
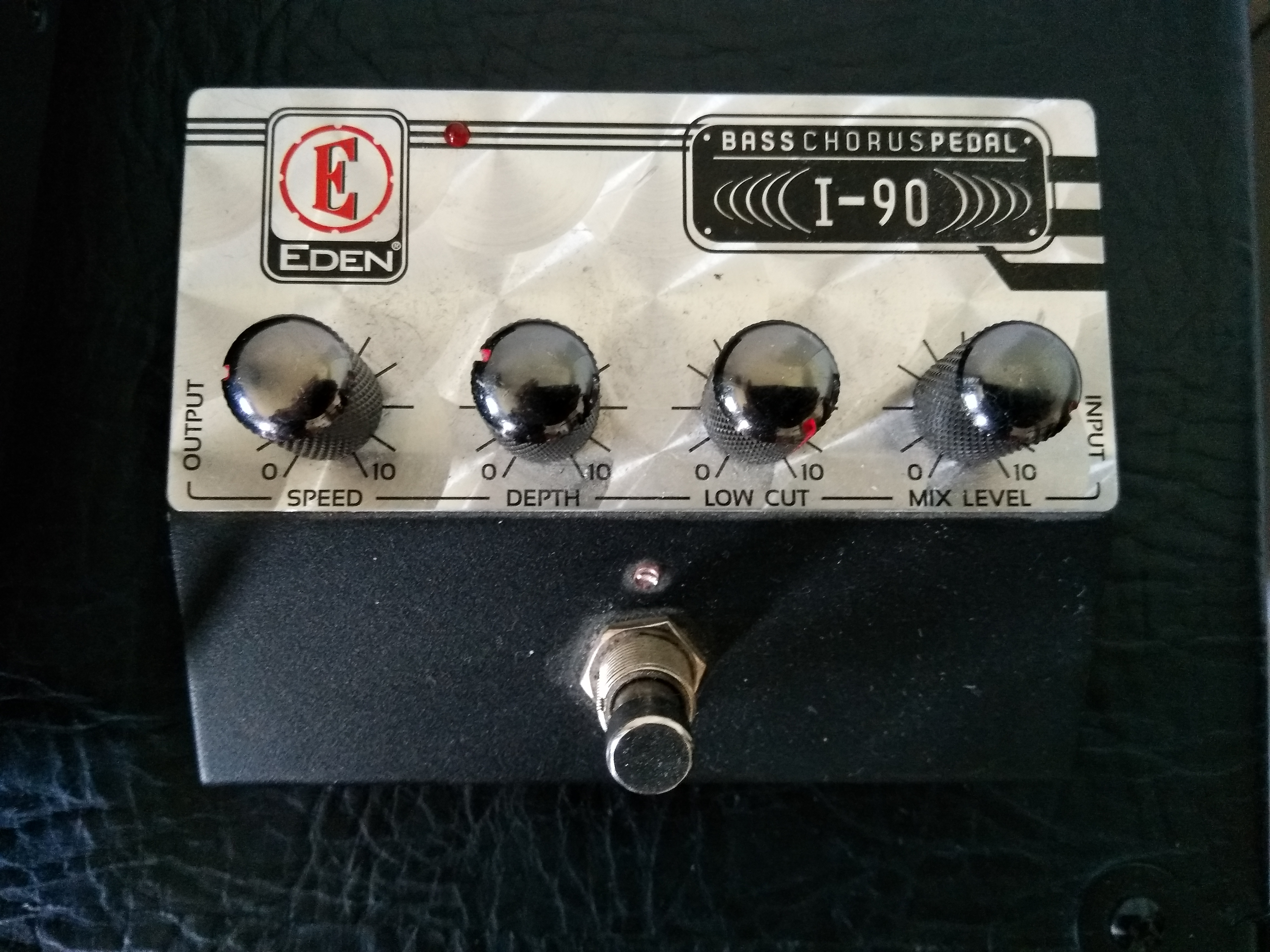
Eden bass chorus pedal I-90.

A bass chorus is an electronic effect used with the electric bass to create a "shimmering" sound. Fundamentally the same as chorus pedals used on guitar, these circuits are optimized to suit a lower tonal range.

== Upright bass ==
Upright bassists in jazz, folk, blues and similar genres typically use a piezoelectric pickup, which is mounted on the wooden bridge or between the bridge and the body. The pickup is then plugged into a bass amp or the PA system. Before the signal is plugged into a bass amp or PA system, many players use a bass preamplifier, a small electronic device that matches the impedance between the pickup and the amp or PA system. Bass preamps also allow for the gain of the signal to be boosted or cut. Some models also offer equalization controls, a compressor, and a DI box connection, which allows the signal to be plugged directly into a PA system or mixing board with an XLR cable.
