= Funk =

Music genre

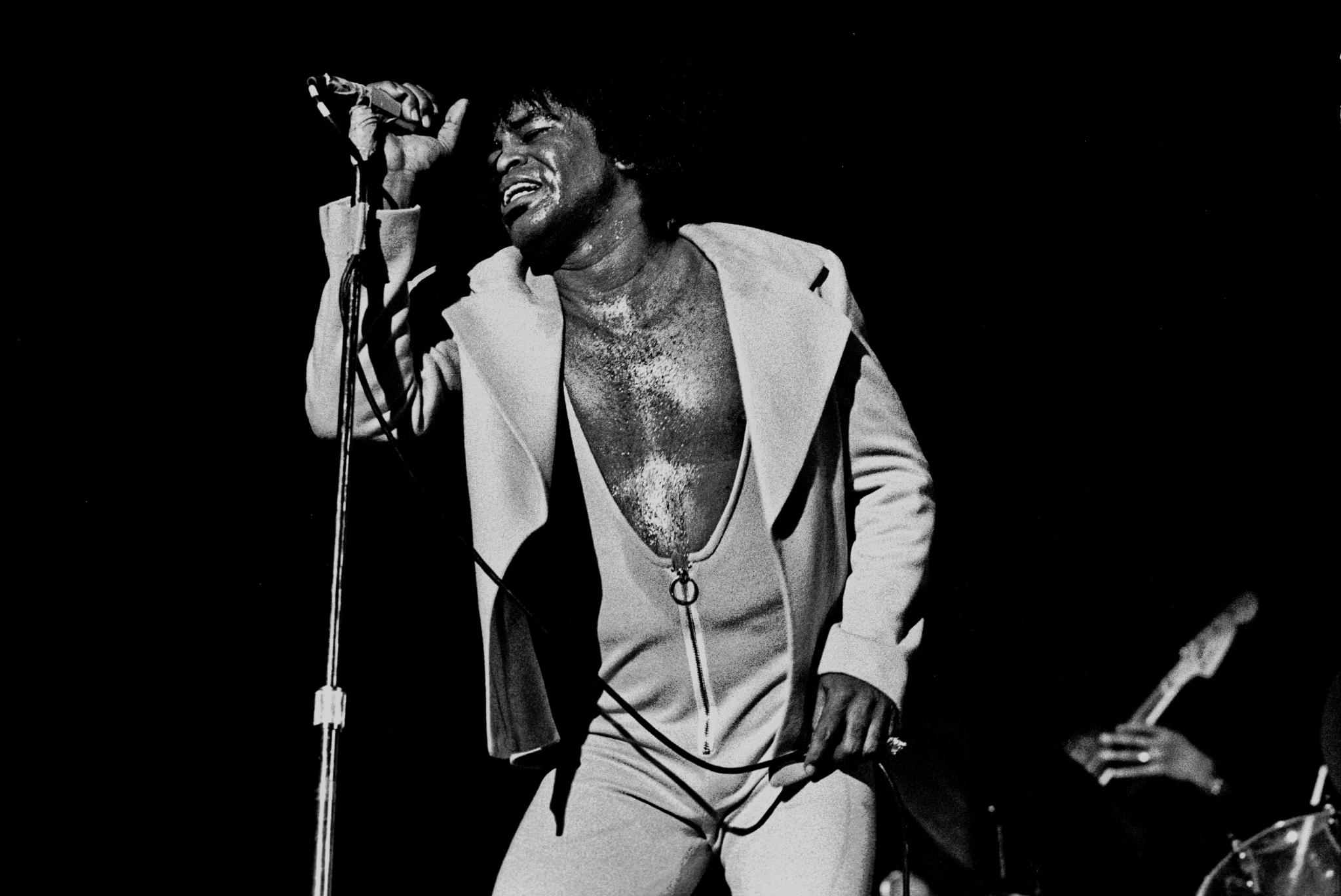
- James Brown, a pioneer of funk, in 1973; one of his many nicknames was the "Minister of New Super Heavy Funk"
- Stylistic origins: Soul; rhythm and blues; jazz; gospel
- Cultural origins: Mid-1960s, United States
- Derivative forms: Disco; hip-hop; post-punk; dance-punk; boogie; contemporary R&B; electro; techno; breakbeat; new jack swing; oldschool jungle; neurofunk; liquid funk; krautrock; funkstep

Subgenres
- Deep funk; go-go

Fusion genres
- Acid jazz; afrobeat; avant-funk; Brit funk; free funk; funk rock; funk metal; funky house; G-funk; jazz-funk; samba funk; psychedelic funk; skweee; swamp rock; UK funky

Other topics
- Musicians; psychedelic soul; African-American music

Funk is a music genre that originated in African-American communities in the mid-1960s when musicians created a rhythmic, danceable new form of music through a mixture of various music genres that were popular among African-Americans in the mid-20th century. It deemphasizes melody and chord progressions and focuses on a strong rhythmic groove of a bassline played by an electric bassist and a drum part played by a percussionist, often at slower tempos than other popular music. Funk typically consists of a complex percussive groove with rhythm instruments playing interlocking grooves that create a "hypnotic" and "danceable" feel. Early funk, specifically James Brown, fused jazz and blues, and added a syncopated drum groove.

Funk originated in the mid-1960s, with James Brown's development of a signature groove that emphasized the downbeat—with a heavy emphasis on the first beat of every measure ("The One"), and the application of swung 16th notes and syncopation on all basslines, drum patterns, and guitar riffs. Rock- and psychedelia-influenced musicians The Chambers Brothers, Sly and the Family Stone and Parliament-Funkadelic fostered more eclectic examples of the genre beginning in the late 1960s. Other musical groups developed Brown's innovations during the 1970s and the 1980s, including Kool and the Gang, Ohio Players, Fatback Band, Jimmy Castor Bunch, Bootsy Collins, Earth, Wind & Fire, B.T. Express, Hamilton Bohannon, One Way, Lakeside, Dazz Band, The Gap Band, Slave, Aurra, Roger Troutman & Zapp, Con Funk Shun, Cameo, Bar-Kays and Chic.

Funk derivatives include avant-funk, an avant-garde strain of funk; boogie, a hybrid of electronic music and funk; funk metal; G-funk, a mix of gangsta rap and psychedelic funk; Timba, a form of funky Cuban dance music; and funk jam. It is also the main influence of Washington go-go, a funk subgenre. Funk samples and breakbeats have been used extensively in hip-hop and electronic dance music.

== Etymology ==
The word funk initially referred (and still refers) to a strong odor. It is originally derived from Latin fumigare (which means "to smoke") via Old French fungiere and, in this sense, it was first documented in English in 1620. In 1784, funky meaning "musty" was first documented, which, in turn, led to a sense of "earthy" that was taken up around 1900 in early jazz slang for something "deeply or strongly felt". Even though in white culture, the term funk can have negative connotations of odor or being in a bad mood (in a funk), in African communities, the term funk, while still linked to body odor, had the positive sense that a musician's hard-working, honest effort led to sweat, and from their "physical exertion" came an "exquisite" and "superlative" performance.

In early jam sessions, musicians would encourage one another to "get down" by telling one another, "Now, put some stank on it!" At least as early as 1907, jazz songs carried titles such as Funky. The first example is an unrecorded number by Buddy Bolden, remembered as either "Funky Butt" or "Buddy Bolden's Blues", with improvised lyrics that were, according to Donald M. Marquis, either "comical and light" or "crude and downright obscene" but, in one way or another, referring to the sweaty atmosphere at dances where Bolden's band played. As late as the 1950s and early 1960s, when funk and funky were used increasingly in the context of jazz music, the terms still were considered indelicate and inappropriate for use in polite company. According to one source, New Orleans-born drummer Earl Palmer "was the first to use the word 'funky' to explain to other musicians that their music should be made more syncopated and danceable." The style later evolved into a rather hard-driving, insistent rhythm, implying a more carnal quality. This early form of the music set the pattern for later musicians. The music was identified as slow, sexy, loose, riff-oriented and danceable.

The meaning of funk continues to captivate the genre of black music, feeling, and knowledge. Recent scholarship in black studies has taken the term funk in its many iterations to consider the range of black movement and culture. In particular, L.H. Stallings's Funk the Erotic: Transaesthetics and Black Sexual Cultures explores these multiple meanings of funk as a way to theorize sexuality, culture, and western hegemony within the many locations of funk: "street parties, drama/theater, strippers and strip clubs, pornography, and self-published fiction."

== Characteristics ==
=== Rhythm and tempo ===
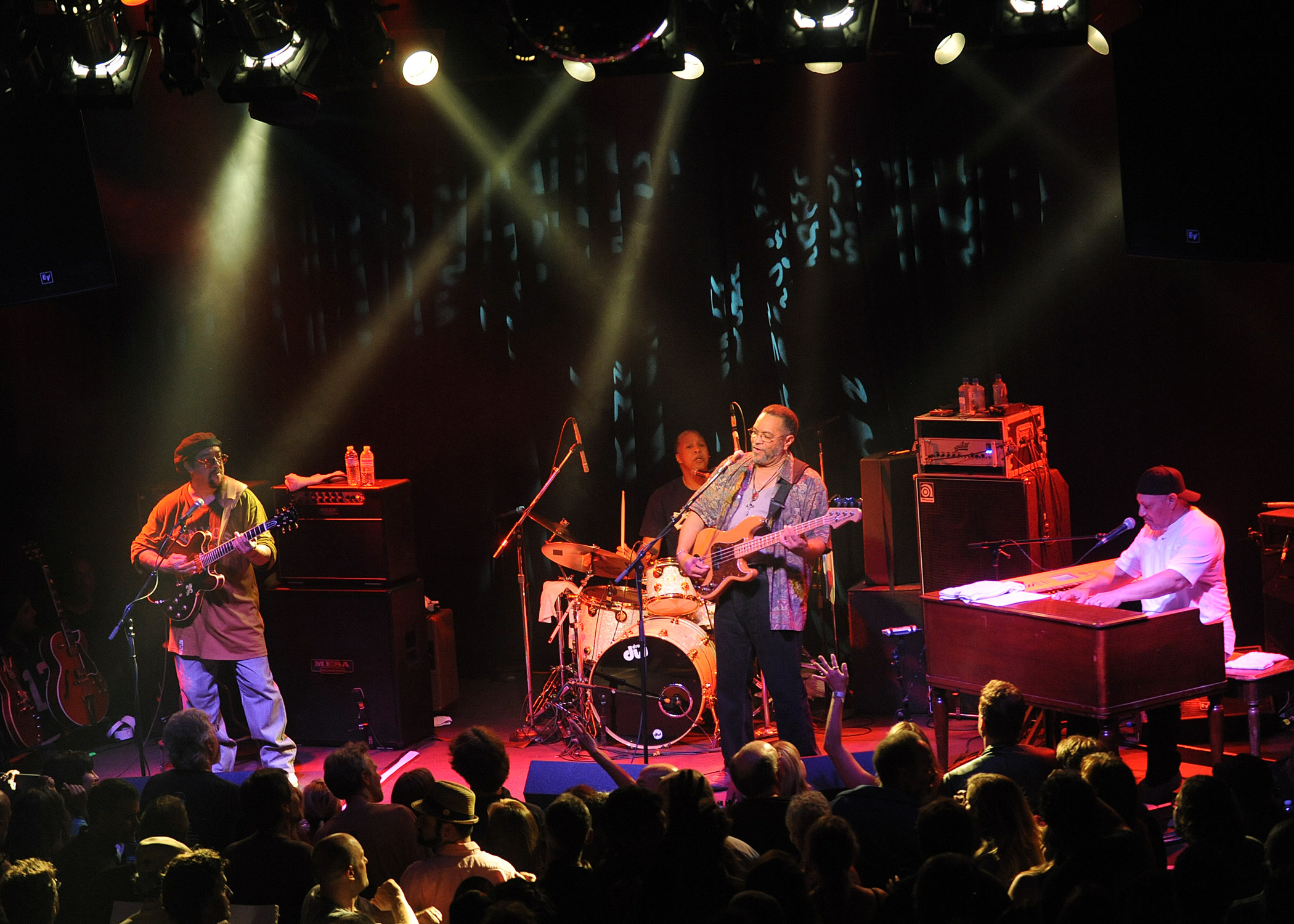
The rhythm section of a funk band—the electric bass, drums, electric guitar and keyboards—is the heartbeat of the funk sound. Pictured here are the Meters.

Like soul, funk is based on dance music, so it has a strong "rhythmic role". The sound of funk is as much based on the "spaces between the notes" as the notes that are played; as such, rests between notes are important. While there are rhythmic similarities between funk and disco, funk has a "central dance beat that's slower, sexier and more syncopated than disco", and funk rhythm section musicians add more "subtextures", complexity and "personality" onto the main beat than a programmed synth-based disco ensemble.

Before funk, most pop music was based on sequences of eighth notes, because the fast tempos made further subdivisions of the beat infeasible. The innovation of funk was that by using slower tempos (surely influenced by the revival of blues in the early 1960s), funk "created space for further rhythmic subdivision, so a bar of 4/4 could now accommodate possible 16 note placements." Specifically, by having the guitar and drums play in "motoring" sixteenth-note rhythms, it created the opportunity for the other instruments to play "more syncopated, broken-up style", which facilitated a move to more "liberated" basslines. Together, these "interlocking parts" created a "hypnotic" and "danceable feel".

A great deal of funk is rhythmically based on a two-celled onbeat/offbeat structure, which originated in sub-Saharan African music traditions. New Orleans appropriated the bifurcated structure from the Afro-Cuban mambo and conga in the late 1940s, and made it its own. New Orleans funk, as it was called, gained international acclaim largely because James Brown's rhythm section used it to great effect.

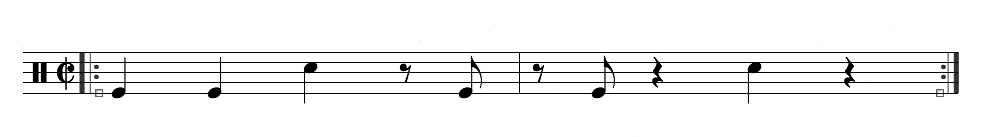
Simple kick and snare funk motif. The kick first sounds two onbeats, which are then answered by two offbeats. The snare sounds the backbeat.

=== Harmony ===
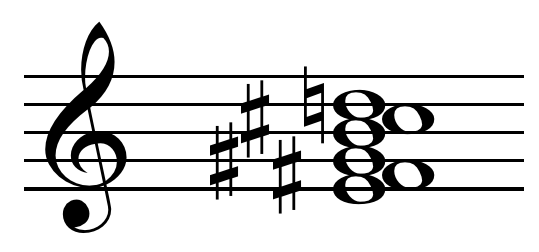
A thirteenth chord (E 13, which also contains a flat 7th and a 9th)

Funk uses the same richly colored extended chords found in bebop jazz, such as minor chords with added sevenths and elevenths, or dominant seventh chords with altered ninths. Some examples of chords used in funk are minor eleventh chords (e.g., F minor 11th); dominant seventh with added sharp ninth and a suspended fourth (e.g., C7 (#9) sus 4); dominant ninth chords (e.g., F9); and minor sixth chords (e.g., C minor 6). The six-ninth chord is used in funk (e.g., F 6/9); it is a major chord with an added sixth and ninth. In funk, minor seventh chords are more common than minor triads because minor triads were found to be too thin-sounding. Some of the best known and most skillful soloists in funk have jazz backgrounds. Trombonist Fred Wesley and saxophonists Pee Wee Ellis and Maceo Parker are among the most notable musicians in the funk music genre, having worked with James Brown, George Clinton and Prince.

Unlike bebop jazz, with its complex, rapid-fire chord changes, funk often uses a static single-chord or two-chord vamp (often alternating a minor seventh chord and a related dominant seventh chord, such as A minor to D7) during all or part of a song, with melodo-harmonic movement and a complex, driving rhythmic feel. Even though some funk songs are mainly one-chord vamps, the rhythm section musicians may embellish this chord by moving it up or down a semitone or a tone to create chromatic passing chords. For example, the verse section of "Play That Funky Music" (by Wild Cherry) mainly uses an E ninth chord, but it also uses F#9 and F9.

The chords used in funk songs typically imply a Dorian or Mixolydian mode, as opposed to the major or natural minor tonalities of most popular music. Melodic content was derived by mixing these modes with the blues scale. In the 1970s, jazz music drew upon funk to create a new subgenre of jazz-funk, which can be heard in recordings by Miles Davis (Live-Evil, On the Corner), and Herbie Hancock (Head Hunters).

=== Improvisation ===
Funk continues the African musical tradition of improvisation, in that in a funk band, the group would typically "feel" when to change, by "jamming" and "grooving", even in the studio recording stage, which might only be based on the skeleton framework for each song. Funk uses "collective improvisation", in which musicians at rehearsals would have what was metaphorically a musical "conversation", an approach which extended to the onstage performances.

=== Instruments ===
==== Bass guitar ====
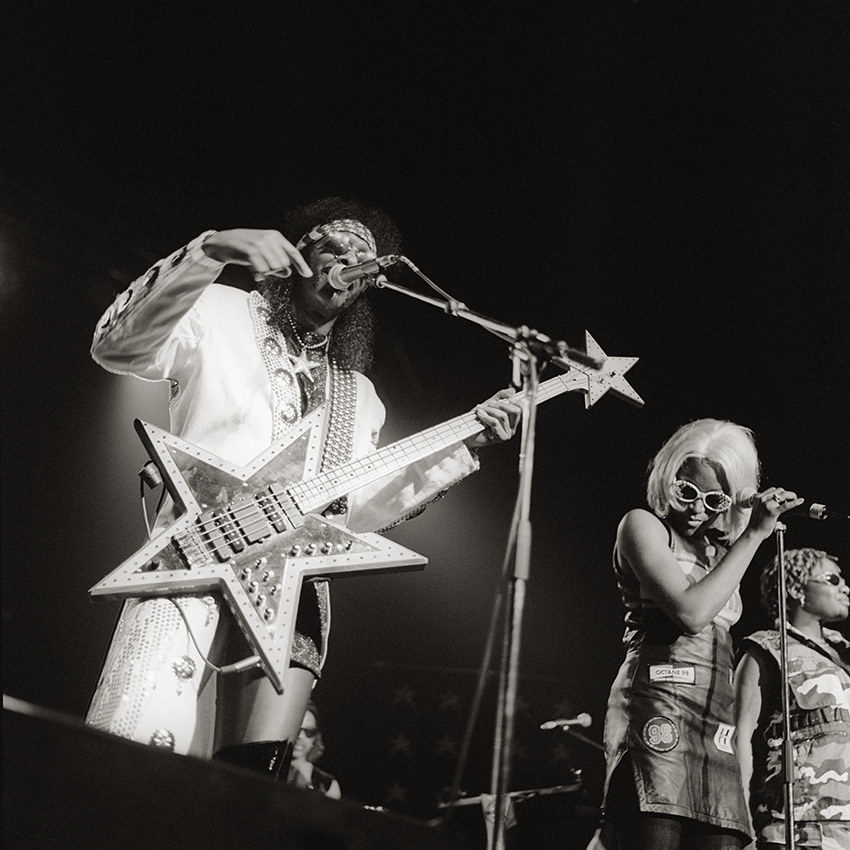
Bootsy Collins performing in 1996 with a star-shaped bass

Funk creates an intense groove by using strong guitar riffs and basslines played on electric bass. Like Motown recordings, funk songs use basslines as the centerpiece of songs. Indeed, funk has been called the style in which the bassline is most prominent in the songs, with the bass playing the "hook" of the song. Early funk basslines used syncopation (typically syncopated eighth notes), but with the addition of more of a "driving feel" than in New Orleans funk, and they used blues scale notes along with the major third above the root. Later funk basslines use sixteenth note syncopation, blues scales, and repetitive patterns, often with leaps of an octave or a larger interval.

This funky bassline includes percussive slapping, rhythmic ghost notes, and glissando effects.

Funk basslines emphasize repetitive patterns, locked-in grooves, continuous playing, and slap and popping bass. Slapping and popping uses a mixture of thumb-slapped low notes (also called "thumped") and finger "popped" (or plucked) high notes, allowing the bass to have a drum-like rhythmic role, which became a distinctive element of funk. Notable slap and funky players include Bernard Edwards (Chic), Robert "Kool" Bell, Mark Adams (Slave), Johnny Flippin (Fatback) and Bootsy Collins. While slap and funky is important, some influential bassists who play funk, such as Rocco Prestia (from Tower of Power), did not use the approach, and instead used a typical fingerstyle method based on James Jamerson's Motown playing style. Larry Graham from Sly and the Family Stone is an influential bassist.

Funk bass has an "earthy, percussive kind of feel", in part due to the use of muted, rhythmic ghost notes (also called "dead notes"). Some funk bass players use electronic effects units to alter the tone of their instrument, such as "envelope filters" (an auto-wah effect that creates a "gooey, slurpy, quacky, and syrupy" sound) and imitate keyboard synthesizer bass tones (e.g., the Mutron envelope filter) and overdriven fuzz bass effects, which are used to create the "classic fuzz tone that sounds like old school Funk records". Other effects that are used include the flanger and bass chorus. Collins also used a Mu-Tron Octave Divider, an octave pedal that, like the Octavia pedal popularized by Hendrix, can double a note an octave above and below to create a "futuristic and fat low-end sound".

==== Drums ====
One could argue that no music form highlights the drummer more than funk. The fat grooves, the dirty backbeats, the snap of a tight snare, the syncopated hits with a stellar horn section, the deep pocket against a smooth bass line…you're probably groovin' in your seat just thinking about it. Funk music is all about the beat, and it's no coincidence that many of our most influential drummers have made a name for themselves playing the style.

— Jeff Schaller of Modern Drummer (December 28, 2011)

Funk drumming creates a groove by emphasizing the drummer's "feel and emotion", which including "occasional tempo fluctuations", the use of swing feel in some songs (e.g., "Cissy Strut" by The Meters and "I'll Take You There" by The Staple Singers, which have a half-swung feel), and less use of fills (as they can lessen the groove). Drum fills are "few and economical", to ensure that the drumming stays "in the pocket", with a steady tempo and groove. These playing techniques are supplemented by a set-up for the drum kit that often includes muffled bass drums and toms and tightly tuned snare drums. Double bass drumming sounds are often done by funk drummers with a single pedal, an approach which "accents the second note... [and] deadens the drumhead's resonance", which gives a short, muffled bass drum sound.

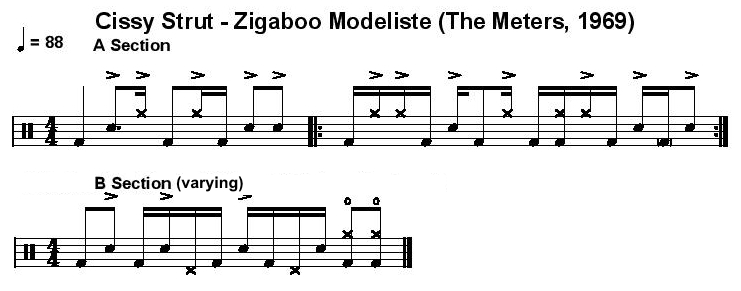
The drum groove from "Cissy Strut"

James Brown used two drummers such as Clyde Stubblefield and John 'Jabo' Starks in recording and soul shows. By using two drummers, the JB band was able to maintain a "solid syncopated" rhythmic sound, which contributed to the band's distinctive "Funky Drummer" rhythm.

In Tower of Power drummer David Garibaldi's playing, there are many ghost notes and rim shots. A key part of the funk drumming style is using the hi-hat, with opening and closing the hi-hats during playing (to create "splash" accent effects) being an important approach. Two-handed sixteenth notes on the hi-hats, sometimes with a degree of swing feel, is used in funk.

Jim Payne states that funk drumming uses a "wide-open" approach to improvisation around rhythmic ideas from Latin music, ostinatos, that are repeated "with only slight variations", an approach which he says causes the "mesmerizing" nature of funk. Payne states that funk can be thought of as "rock played in a more syncopated manner", particularly with the bass drum, which plays syncopated eighth-note and sixteenth-note patterns that were innovated by drummer Clive Williams (with Joe Tex); George Brown (with Kool & the Gang) and James "Diamond" Williams (with The Ohio Players). As with rock, the snare provides backbeats in most funk (albeit with additional soft ghost notes).

==== Electric guitar ====
In funk, guitarists often mix playing chords of a short duration (nicknamed "stabs") with faster rhythms and riffs. Guitarists playing rhythmic parts often play sixteenth notes, including with percussive ghost notes. Chord extensions are favored, such as ninth chords. Typically, funk uses "two interlocking [electric] guitar parts", with a rhythm guitarist and a "tenor guitarist" who plays single notes. The two guitarists trade off their lines to create a "call-and-response, intertwined pocket." If a band only has one guitarist, this effect may be recreated by overdubbing in the studio, or, in a live show, by having a single guitarist play both parts, to the degree that this is possible.

In funk bands, guitarists typically play in a percussive style, using a style of picking called the "chank" or "chicken scratch", in which the guitar strings are pressed lightly against the fingerboard and then quickly released just enough to get a muted "scratching" sound that is produced by rapid rhythmic strumming of the opposite hand near the bridge. Early examples of that technique used on rhythm and blues are heard on the Johnny Otis song "Willie and the Hand Jive" in 1957, with future James Brown band guitar player Jimmy Nolen. The technique can be broken down into three approaches: the "chika", the "chank" and the "choke". With the "chika" comes a muted sound of strings being hit against the fingerboard; "chank" is a staccato attack done by releasing the chord with the fretting hand after strumming it; and "choking" generally uses all the strings being strummed and heavily muted.

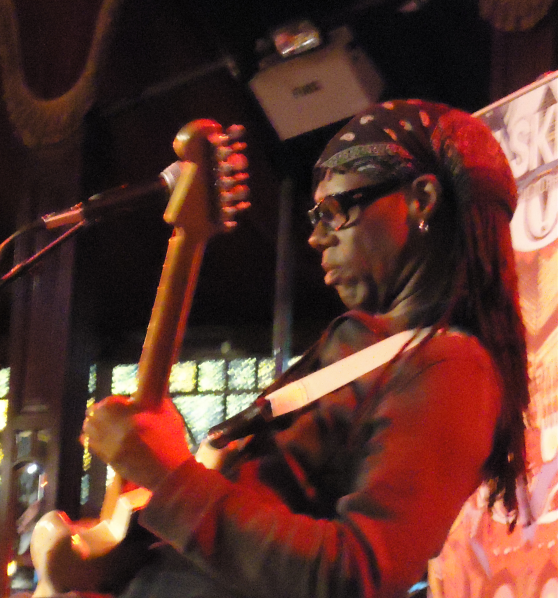
Guitarist Nile Rodgers is best known for his performances with Chic.

The result of these factors was a rhythm guitar sound that seemed to float somewhere between the low-end thump of the electric bass and the cutting tone of the snare and hi-hats, with a rhythmically melodic feel that fell deep in the pocket. Guitarist Jimmy Nolen, longtime guitarist for James Brown, developed this technique. On Brown's "Give It Up or Turnit a Loose" (1969), however, Jimmy Nolen's guitar part has a bare bones tonal structure. The pattern of attack-points is the emphasis, not the pattern of pitches. The guitar is used the way that an African drum, or idiophone would be used. Nolen created a "clean, trebly tone" by using "hollow-body jazz guitars with single-coil P-90 pickups" plugged into a Fender Twin Reverb amp with the mid turned down low and the treble turned up high.

Funk guitarists playing rhythm guitar generally avoid distortion effects and amp overdrive to get a clean sound, and given the importance of a crisp, high sound, Fender Stratocasters and Telecasters were widely used for their cutting treble tone. The mids are often cut by guitarists to help the guitar sound different from the horn section, keyboards and other instruments. Given the focus on providing a rhythmic groove, and the lack of emphasis on instrumental guitar melodies and guitar solos, sustain is not sought out by funk rhythm guitarists. Funk rhythm guitarists use compressor volume-control effects to enhance the sound of muted notes, which boosts the "clucking" sound and adds "percussive excitement to funk rhythms" (an approach used by Nile Rodgers).

Guitarist Eddie Hazel from Funkadelic is notable for his solo improvisation (particularly for the solo on "Maggot Brain") and guitar riffs, the tone of which was shaped by a Maestro FZ-1 Fuzz-Tone pedal. Hazel, along with guitarist Ernie Isley of the Isley Brothers, was influenced by Jimi Hendrix's improvised, wah-wah infused solos. Ernie Isley was tutored at an early age by Hendrix, when Hendrix was a part of the Isley Brothers backing band and temporarily lived in the Isleys' household. Funk guitarists use the wah-wah sound effect along with muting the notes to create a percussive sound for their guitar riffs. The phaser effect is often used in funk and R&B guitar playing for its filter sweeping sound effect, an example being the Isley Brothers' song "Who's That Lady". Michael Hampton, another P-Funk guitarist, was able to play Hazel's virtuosic solo on "Maggot Brain", using a solo approach that added in string bends and Hendrix-style feedback.

==== Keyboards ====
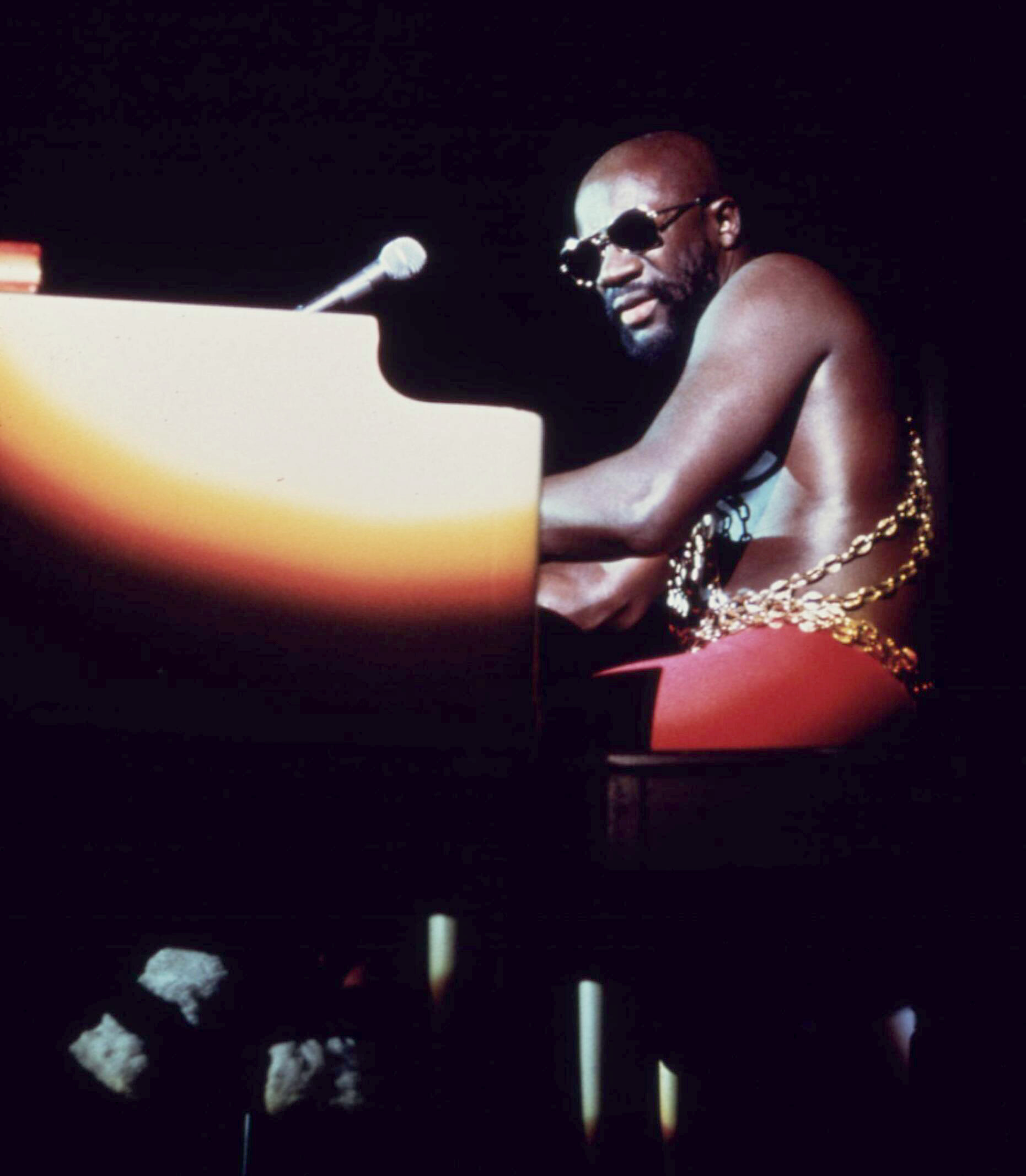
Isaac Hayes playing keyboards in 1973

A range of keyboard instruments are used in funk. Acoustic piano is used in funk, including in "September" by Earth Wind & Fire and "Will It Go Round in Circles" by Billy Preston. The electric piano is used on songs such as Herbie Hancock's "Chameleon" (a Fender Rhodes) and "Mercy, Mercy, Mercy" by Joe Zawinul (a Wurlitzer). The clavinet is used for its percussive tone, and it can be heard in songs such as Stevie Wonder's "Superstition" and "Higher Ground" and Bill Withers' "Use Me". The Hammond B-3 organ is used in funk, in songs such as "Cissy Strut" by The Meters and "Love the One You're With" (with Aretha Franklin singing and Billy Preston on keyboards).

Bernie Worrell's range of keyboards from his recordings with Parliament Funkadelic demonstrate the wide range of keyboards used in funk, as they include the Hammond organ ("Funky Woman", "Hit It and Quit It", "Wars of Armageddon"); RMI electric piano ("I Wanna Know If It's Good to You?", "Free Your Mind", "Loose Booty"); acoustic piano ("Funky Dollar Bill", "Jimmy's Got a Little Bit of Bitch in Him"); clavinet ("Joyful Process", "Up for the Down Stroke", "Red Hot Mama"); Minimoog synthesizer ("Atmosphere", "Flash Light", "Aqua Boogie", "Knee Deep", "Let's Take It to the Stage"); and ARP string ensemble synth ("Chocolate City", "Give Up the Funk (Tear the Roof off the Sucker)", "Undisco Kidd").

Synthesizers were used in funk both to add to the deep sound of the electric bass, or even to replace the electric bass altogether in some songs. Funk synthesizer bass, most often a Minimoog, was used because it could create layered sounds and new electronic tones that were not feasible on electric bass.

=== Vocals and lyrics ===
In the 1970s, funk used many of the same vocal styles that were used in African-American music in the 1960s, including singing influences from blues, gospel, jazz and doo-wop. Like these other African-American styles, funk used "[y]ells, shouts, hollers, moans, humming, and melodic riffs", along with styles such as call and response and narration of stories (like the African oral tradition approach). The call and response in funk can be between the lead singer and the band members who act as backup vocalists.

As funk emerged from soul, the vocals in funk share soul's approach; however, funk vocals tend to be "more punctuated, energetic, rhythmically percussive[,] and less embellished" with ornaments, and the vocal lines tend to resemble horn parts and have "pushed" rhythms. Funk bands such as Earth, Wind & Fire have harmony vocal parts. Songs like "Super Bad" by James Brown included "double-voice" along with "yells, shouts and screams". Funk singers used a "black aesthetic" to perform that made use of "colorful and lively exchange of gestures, facial expressions, body posture, and vocal phrases" to create an engaging performance.

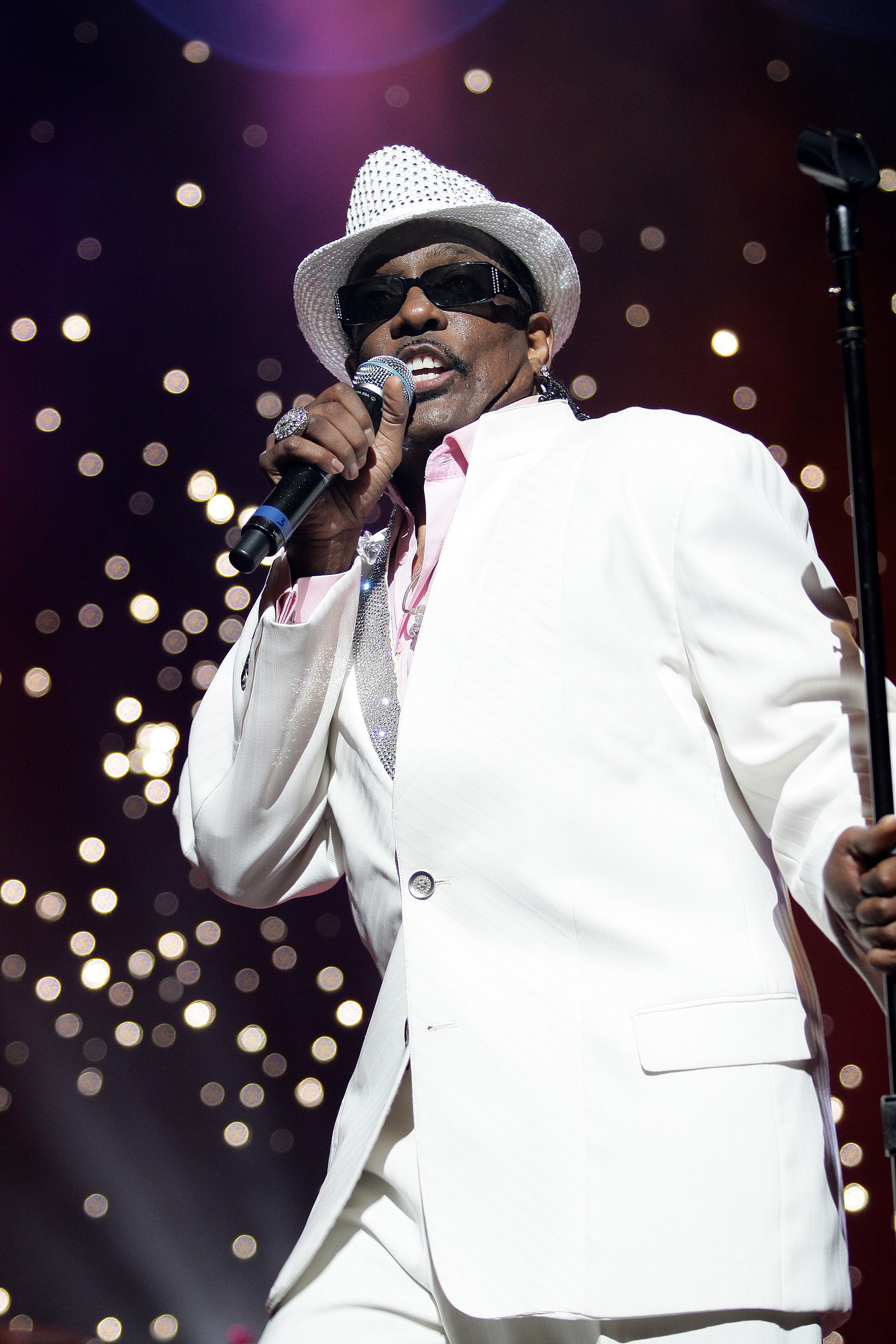
Singer Charlie Wilson

The lyrics in funk music addressed issues faced by the African American community in the United States during the 1970s, which arose due to the move away from an industrial, working-class economy to an information economy, which harmed the Black working class. Funk songs by The Ohio Players, Earth, Wind & Fire, and James Brown raised issues faced by lower-income Blacks in their song lyrics, such as poor "economic conditions and themes of poor inner-city life in the black communities".

The Funkadelic song "One Nation Under A Groove" (1978) is about the challenges that Blacks overcame during the 1960s civil rights movement, and it includes an exhortation for Blacks in the 1970s to capitalize on the new "social and political opportunities" that had become available in the 1970s. The Isley Brothers song "Fight the Power" (1975) has a political message. Parliament's song "Chocolate City" (1975) metaphorically refers to Washington, D.C., and other US cities that have a mainly Black population, and it draws attention to the potential power that Black voters wield and suggests that a Black President be considered in the future.

The political themes of funk songs and the aiming of the messages to a Black audience echoed the new image of Blacks that was created in the Blaxploitation films of the time, which depicted "African-American men and women standing their ground and fighting for what was right". Both funk and Blaxploitation films addressed issues faced by Blacks and told stories from a Black perspective. Many Blaxploitation films of the 1970s used funk soundtracks (e.g., Curtis Mayfield for Superfly; James Brown and Fred Wesley for Black Caesar and War for Youngblood).

Funk songs included metaphorical language that was understood best by listeners who were "familiar with the black aesthetic and [black] vernacular". For example, funk songs included expressions such as "shake your money maker", "funk yourself right out" and "move your boogie body". Another example is the use of "bad" in the song "Super Bad" (1970), which black listeners knew meant "good" or "great".

In the 1970s, to get around radio obscenity restrictions, funk artists would use double entendres and words that sounded similar to non-allowed words. For example, The Ohio Players had a song entitled "Fopp" which referred to "Fopp me right, don't you fopp me wrong/We'll be foppin' all night long...". Some funk songs used made-up words which suggested that they were "writing lyrics in a constant haze of marijuana smoke", such as Parliament's "Aqua Boogie (A Psychoalphadiscobetabioaquadoloop)", which includes words such as "bioaquadoloop". The mainstream white listener base was often not able to understand funk's lyrical messages, which contributed to funk's lack of popular music chart success with white audiences during the 1970s.

=== Other instruments ===
Horn section arrangements with groups of brass instruments are often used in funk songs. Funk horn sections could include saxophone (often tenor sax), trumpet, trombone, and for larger horn sections, such as quintets and sextets, a baritone sax. Horn sections played "rhythmic and syncopated" parts, often with "offbeat phrases" that emphasize "rhythmic displacement". Funk song introductions are an important place for horn arrangements.

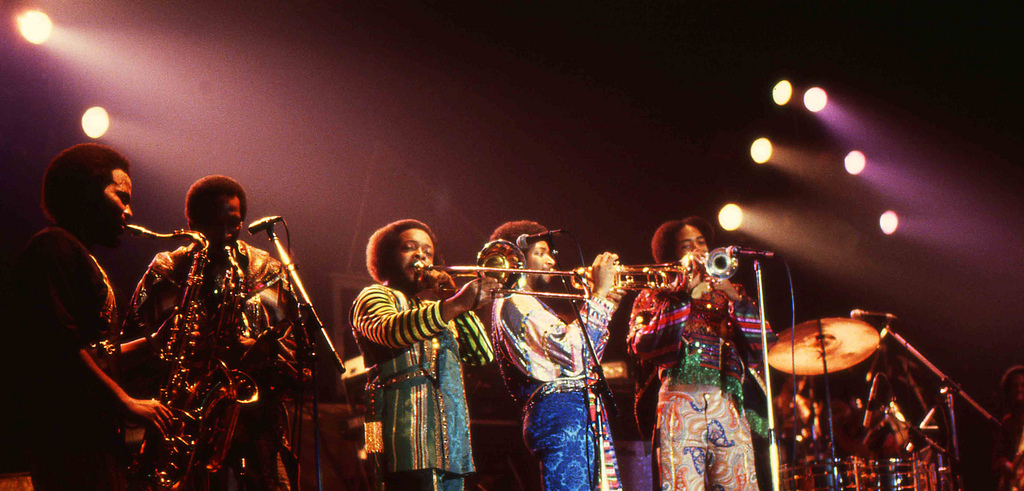
Funk horn sections typically include saxophones and trumpets. Larger horn sections often add a second instrument for one of the saxes or trumpets, and a trombone or bari sax may also be used. Pictured is the Earth, Wind and Fire horn section.

Funk horn sections performed in a "rhythmic percussive style" that mimicked the approach used by funk rhythm guitarists. Horn sections would "punctuate" the lyrics by playing in the spaces between vocals, using "short staccato rhythmic blast[s]". Notable funk horn players included Alfred "PeeWee" Ellis, trombonist Fred Wesley, and alto sax player Maceo Parker. Notable funk horn sections including the Phoenix Horns (with Earth, Wind & Fire), the Horny Horns (with Parliament), the Memphis Horns (with Isaac Hayes), and MFSB (with Curtis Mayfield).

The instruments in funk horn sections varied. If there were two horn players, it could be trumpet and sax, trumpet and trombone, or two saxes. A standard horn trio would consist of trumpet, sax, and trombone, but trios of one trumpet with two saxes, or two trumpets with one sax, were also fairly common. A quartet would be set up the same as a standard horn trio, but with an extra trumpet, sax, or (less frequently) trombone player. Quintets would either be a trio of saxes (typically alto/tenor/baritone, or tenor/tenor/baritone) with a trumpet and a trombone, or a pair each of trumpets and saxes with one trombone. With six instruments, the horn section would usually be two trumpets, three saxes, and a trombone.

Notable songs with funk horn sections include:

- "Cold Sweat" (James Brown & the Famous Flames), 1967
- "Superstition" (Stevie Wonder), 1972
- "Funky Stuff" (Kool & The Gang), 1973
- "What Is Hip?" (Tower of Power), 1973
- "Pick Up the Pieces" (Average White Band)
- "Up for the Down Stroke" (Parliament), 1974
- "Hair" (Graham Central Station), 1974
- "Too Hot to Stop" (The Bar-Kays), 1976
- "Getaway" (Earth, Wind & Fire), 1976

In bands or shows where hiring a horn section is not feasible, a keyboardist can play the horn parts on a synthesizer with brass patches; however, choosing an authentic-sounding synthesizer and brass patch is important. In the 2010s, with micro-MIDI synths, it may even have been possible to have another instrumentalist play the keyboard brass parts, thus enabling the keyboardist to continue to comp throughout the song.

=== Costumes and style ===
Funk bands in the 1970s adopted Afro-American fashion and style, including "Bell-bottom pants, platform shoes, hoop earring[s], Afros [hairstyles], leather vests,... beaded necklaces", dashiki shirts, jumpsuits and boots. In contrast to earlier bands such as The Temptations, which wore "matching suits" and "neat haircuts" to appeal to white mainstream audiences, funk bands adopted an "African spirit" in their outfits and style. George Clinton and Parliament are known for their imaginative costumes and "freedom of dress", which included bedsheets acting as robes and capes.

== History ==
Funk was formed through a mixture of various music genres that were popular among African Americans in the mid-20th century. Musicologist Anne Danielsen wrote that funk might be placed in the lineage of rhythm and blues, jazz, and soul. Sociologist Darby E. Southgate wrote that funk is "an amalgam of gospel, soul, jazz fusion, rhythm and blues, and black rock."

The distinctive characteristics of African-American musical expression are rooted in sub-Saharan African music traditions, and find their earliest expression in spirituals, work chants/songs, praise shouts, gospel, blues, and "body rhythms" (hambone, patting juba, and ring shout clapping and stomping patterns).

Like other styles of African-American musical expression including jazz, soul music and R&B, funk music accompanied many protest movements during and after the Civil Rights Movement.

=== New Orleans ===
Gerhard Kubik notes that with the exception of New Orleans, early blues lacked complex polyrhythms, and there was a "very specific absence of asymmetric time-line patterns (key patterns) in virtually all early twentieth century African-American music ... only in some New Orleans genres does a hint of simple time line patterns occasionally appear in the form of transient so-called 'stomp' patterns or stop-time chorus. These do not function in the same way as African time lines."

In the late 1940s this changed somewhat when the two-celled time line structure was brought into New Orleans blues. New Orleans musicians were especially receptive to Afro-Cuban influences precisely at the time when R&B was first forming. Dave Bartholomew and Professor Longhair (Henry Roeland Byrd) incorporated Afro-Cuban instruments, as well as the clave pattern and related two-celled figures in songs such as "Carnival Day" (Bartholomew 1949) and "Mardi Gras In New Orleans" (Longhair 1949). Robert Palmer reports that, in the 1940s, Professor Longhair listened to and played with musicians from the islands and "fell under the spell of Perez Prado's mambo records." Professor Longhair's particular style was known locally as rumba-boogie.

One of Longhair's great contributions was his particular approach of adopting two-celled, clave-based patterns into New Orleans rhythm and blues (R&B). Longhair's rhythmic approach became a basic template of funk. According to Dr. John (Malcolm John "Mac" Rebennack Jr.), the Professor "put funk into music ... Longhair's thing had a direct bearing I'd say on a large portion of the funk music that evolved in New Orleans." In his "Mardi Gras in New Orleans", the pianist employs the 2-3 clave onbeat/offbeat motif in a rumba-boogie "guajeo".

The syncopated, but straight subdivision feel of Cuban music (as opposed to swung subdivisions) took root in New Orleans R&B during this time. Alexander Stewart states: "Eventually, musicians from outside of New Orleans began to learn some of the rhythmic practices [of the Crescent City]. Most important of these were James Brown and the drummers and arrangers he employed. Brown's early repertoire had used mostly shuffle rhythms, and some of his most successful songs were 12/8 ballads (e.g. "Please, Please, Please" (1956), "Bewildered" (1961), "I Don't Mind" (1961)). Brown's change to a funkier brand of soul required 4/4 metre and a different style of drumming." Stewart makes the point: "The singular style of rhythm & blues that emerged from New Orleans in the years after World War II played an important role in the development of funk. In a related development, the underlying rhythms of American popular music underwent a basic, yet generally unacknowledged transition from triplet or shuffle feel to even or straight eighth notes."

=== 1960s ===
==== James Brown ====
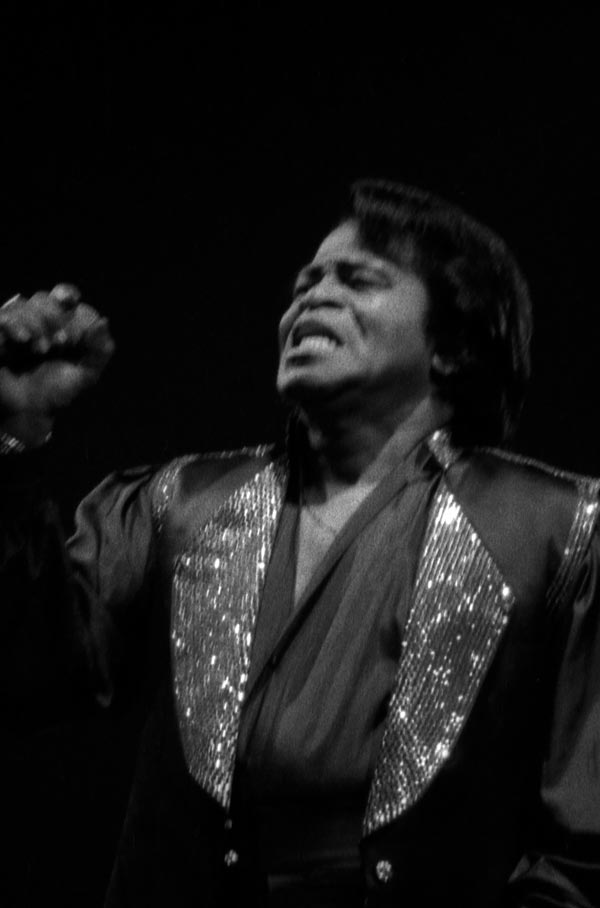
James Brown, a progenitor of funk music

James Brown credited Little Richard's 1950s R&B road band, The Upsetters from New Orleans, as "the first to put the funk into the rhythm" of rock and roll. Following his temporary exit from secular music to become an evangelist in 1957, some of Little Richard's band members joined Brown and the Famous Flames, beginning a long string of hits for them in 1958. By the mid-1960s, James Brown had developed his signature groove that emphasized the downbeat—with heavy emphasis on the first beat of every measure to etch his distinctive sound, rather than the backbeat that typified African-American music. Brown often cued his band with the command "On the one!," changing the percussion emphasis/accent from the one-two-three-four backbeat of traditional soul music to the one-two-three-four downbeat – but with an even-note syncopated guitar rhythm (on quarter notes two and four) featuring a hard-driving, repetitive brassy swing. This one-three beat launched the shift in Brown's signature music style, starting with his 1964 hit single, "Out of Sight" and his 1965 hits, "Papa's Got a Brand New Bag" and "I Got You (I Feel Good)".

Brown's style of funk was based on interlocking, contrapuntal parts: syncopated basslines, 16th beat drum patterns, and syncopated guitar riffs. The main guitar ostinatos for "Ain't it Funky" (c. late 1960s) are an example of Brown's refinement of New Orleans funk— an irresistibly danceable riff, stripped down to its rhythmic essence. On "Ain't it Funky" the tonal structure is barebones. Brown's innovations led to him and his band becoming the seminal funk act; they also pushed the funk music style further to the forefront with releases such as "Cold Sweat" (1967), "Mother Popcorn" (1969) and "Get Up (I Feel Like Being a) Sex Machine" (1970), discarding even the twelve-bar blues featured in his earlier music. Instead, Brown's music was overlaid with "catchy, anthemic vocals" based on "extensive vamps" in which he also used his voice as "a percussive instrument with frequent rhythmic grunts and with rhythm-section patterns ... [resembling] West African polyrhythms" – a tradition evident in African-American work songs and chants. Throughout his career, Brown's frenzied vocals, frequently punctuated with screams and grunts, channeled the "ecstatic ambiance of the black church" in a secular context.

External videos
- Watch: "Clyde Stubblefield/ Funky Drummer" on YouTube

After 1965, Brown's bandleader and arranger was Alfred "Pee Wee" Ellis. Ellis credits Clyde Stubblefield's adoption of New Orleans drumming techniques, as the basis of modern funk: "If, in a studio, you said 'play it funky' that could imply almost anything. But 'give me a New Orleans beat' – you got exactly what you wanted. And Clyde Stubblefield was just the epitome of this funky drumming." Stewart states that the popular feel was passed along from "New Orleans—through James Brown's music, to the popular music of the 1970s." Concerning the various funk motifs, Stewart states that this model "...is different from a time line (such as clave and tresillo) in that it is not an exact pattern, but more of a loose organizing principle."

In a 1990 interview, Brown offered his reason for switching the rhythm of his music: "I changed from the upbeat to the downbeat ... Simple as that, really." According to Maceo Parker, Brown's former saxophonist, playing on the downbeat was at first hard for him and took some getting used to. Reflecting back to his early days with Brown's band, Parker reported that he had difficulty playing "on the one" during solo performances, since he was used to hearing and playing with the accent on the second beat.

==== Parliament-Funkadelic ====
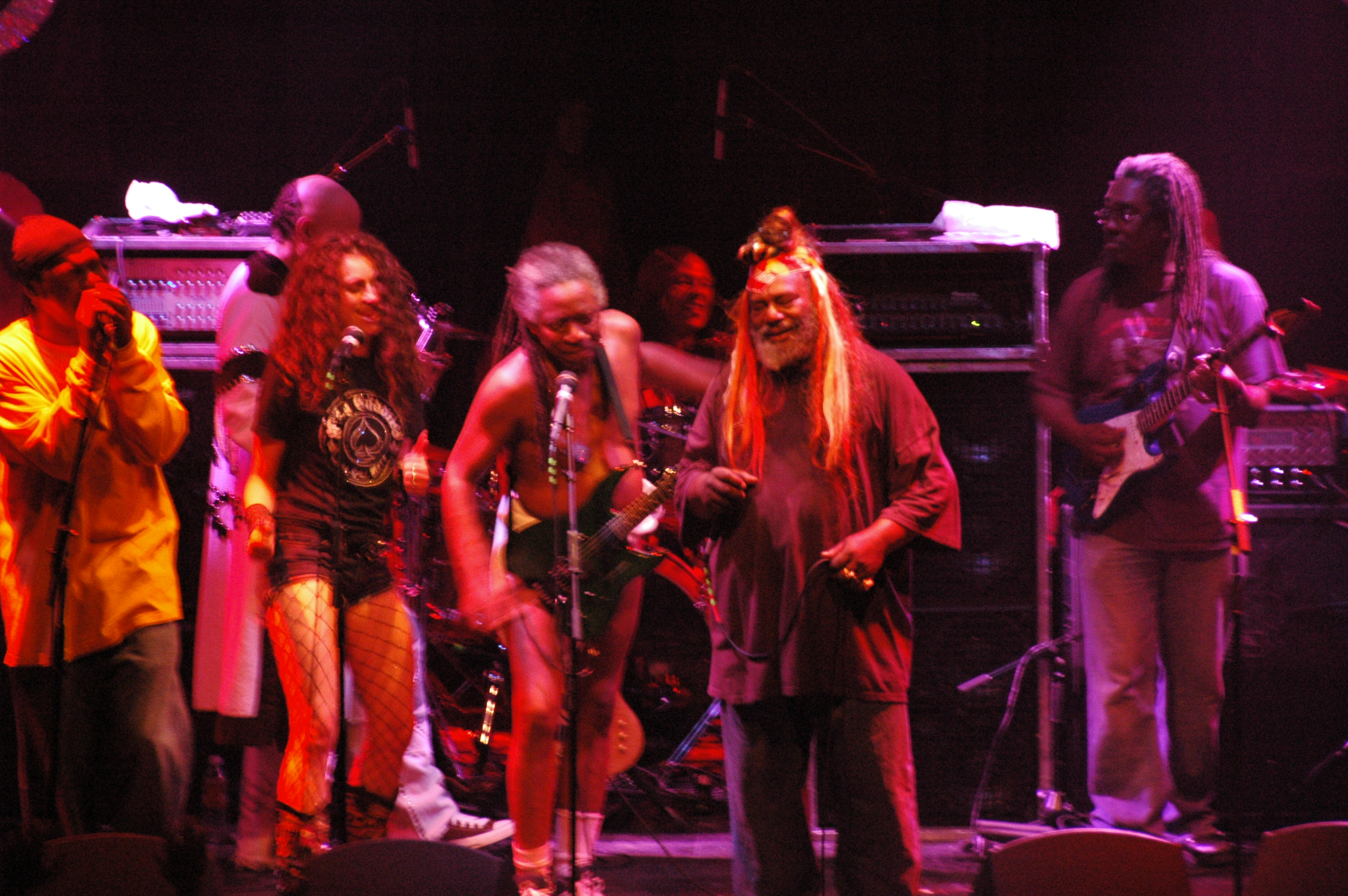
George Clinton and Parliament Funkadelic in 2006

A new group of musicians began to further develop the "funk rock" approach. Innovations were prominently made by George Clinton, with his bands Parliament and Funkadelic. Together, they produced a new kind of funk sound heavily influenced by jazz and psychedelic rock. The two groups shared members and are often referred to collectively as "Parliament-Funkadelic". The breakout popularity of Parliament-Funkadelic gave rise to the term "P-Funk", which referred to the music by George Clinton's bands, and defined a new subgenre. Clinton played a principal role in several other bands, including Parlet, the Horny Horns, and the Brides of Funkenstein, all part of the P-Funk conglomerate. "P-funk" also came to mean something in its quintessence, of superior quality, or sui generis.

Following the work of Jimi Hendrix in the late 1960s, artists such as Sly and the Family Stone combined the psychedelic rock of Hendrix with funk, borrowing wah pedals, fuzz boxes, echo chambers, and vocal distorters from the former, as well as blues rock and jazz. In the following years, groups such as Clinton's Parliament-Funkadelic continued this sensibility, employing synthesizers and rock-oriented guitar work.

=== Late 1960s – early 1970s ===
Other musical groups picked up on the rhythms and vocal style developed by James Brown and his band, and the funk style began to grow. Dyke and the Blazers, based in Phoenix, Arizona, released "Funky Broadway" in 1967, perhaps the first record of the soul music era to have the word "funky" in the title. In 1969 Jimmy McGriff released Electric Funk, featuring his distinctive organ over a blazing horn section. Meanwhile, on the West Coast, Charles Wright & the Watts 103rd Street Rhythm Band was releasing funk tracks beginning with its first album in 1967, culminating in the classic single "Express Yourself" in 1971. Also from the West Coast area, more specifically Oakland, California, came the band Tower of Power (TOP), which formed in 1968. Their debut album, East Bay Grease, released 1970, is considered a milestone in funk. Throughout the 1970s, TOP had many hits, and the band helped to make funk music a successful genre, with a broader audience.

In 1970, Sly & the Family Stone's "Thank You (Falettinme Be Mice Elf Agin)" reached #1 on the charts, as did "Family Affair" in 1971. Notably, these afforded the group and the genre crossover success and greater recognition, yet such success escaped comparatively talented and moderately popular funk band peers. The Meters defined funk in New Orleans, starting with their top ten R&B hits "Sophisticated Cissy" and "Cissy Strut" in 1969. Another group who defined funk around this time were the Isley Brothers, whose funky 1969 #1 R&B hit, "It's Your Thing", signaled a breakthrough in African-American music, bridging the gaps of the jazzy sounds of Brown, the psychedelic rock of Jimi Hendrix, and the upbeat soul of Sly & the Family Stone and Mother's Finest. The Temptations, who had previously helped to define the "Motown Sound" – a distinct blend of pop-soul – adopted this new psychedelic sound towards the end of the 1960s as well. Their producer, Norman Whitfield, became an innovator in the field of psychedelic soul, creating hits with a newer, funkier sound for many Motown acts, including "War" by Edwin Starr, "Smiling Faces Sometimes" by the Undisputed Truth and "Papa Was A Rollin' Stone" by the Temptations. Motown producers Frank Wilson ("Keep On Truckin'") and Hal Davis ("Dancing Machine") followed suit. Stevie Wonder and Marvin Gaye also adopted funk beats for some of their biggest hits in the 1970s, such as "Superstition" and "You Haven't Done Nothin'", and "I Want You" and "Got To Give It Up", respectively. Additionally, Stevie Wonder's composition, (the G.C. Cameron-led) "It's a Shame" (co-written by Syreeta Wright) written for The Spinners which incorporated heavy funk elements.

=== 1970s ===
The Original Family Stone live, 2006. Jerry Martini, Rose Stone, and Cynthia Robinson

The 1970s were the era of highest mainstream visibility for funk music. In addition to Parliament Funkadelic, artists like Sly and the Family Stone, Rufus & Chaka Khan, Bootsy's Rubber Band, the Isley Brothers, Ohio Players, Con Funk Shun, Kool and the Gang, the Bar-Kays, Commodores, Roy Ayers, Curtis Mayfield, and Stevie Wonder, among others, got radio play. Disco music owed a great deal to funk. Many early disco songs and performers came directly from funk-oriented backgrounds. Some disco music hits, such as all of Barry White's hits, "Kung Fu Fighting" by Biddu and Carl Douglas, Donna Summer's "Love To Love You Baby", Diana Ross' "Love Hangover", KC and the Sunshine Band's "I'm Your Boogie Man", "I'm Every Woman" by Chaka Khan (also known as the Queen of Funk), and Chic's "Le Freak" conspicuously include riffs and rhythms derived from funk. In 1976, Rose Royce scored a number-one hit with a purely dance-funk record, "Car Wash". Even with the arrival of disco, funk became increasingly popular well into the early 1980s.

Funk music was also exported to Africa, and it melded with African singing and rhythms to form Afrobeat. Nigerian musician Fela Kuti, who was heavily influenced by James Brown's music, is credited with creating the style and terming it "Afrobeat".

=== Jazz funk ===
Jazz-funk is a subgenre of jazz music characterized by a strong back beat (groove), electrified sounds and an early prevalence of analog synthesizers. The integration of funk, soul, and R&B music and styles into jazz resulted in the creation of a genre whose spectrum is quite wide and ranges from strong jazz improvisation to soul, funk or disco with jazz arrangements, jazz riffs, and jazz solos, and sometimes soul vocals. Jazz-funk is primarily an American genre, where it was popular throughout the 1970s and the early 1980s, but it also achieved noted appeal on the club circuit in England during the mid-1970s. Similar genres include soul jazz and jazz fusion, but neither entirely overlap with jazz-funk. Notably jazz-funk is less vocal, more arranged and featured more improvisation than soul jazz, and retains a strong feel of groove and R&B versus some of the jazz fusion production.

=== 1980s synth-funk ===
In the 1980s, largely as a reaction against what was seen as the over-indulgence of disco, many of the core elements that formed the foundation of the P-Funk formula began to be usurped by electronic instruments, drum machines and synthesizers. Horn sections of saxophones and trumpets were replaced by synth keyboards, and the horns that remained were given simplified lines, and few horn solos were given to soloists. The classic electric keyboards of funk, like the Hammond B3 organ, the Hohner Clavinet and/or the Fender Rhodes piano, began to be replaced by the new digital synthesizers such as the Yamaha DX7 and microprocessor-controlled analog synthesizers like the Prophet-5 and Oberheim OB-X. Electronic drum machines such as the Roland TR-808, Linn LM-1, and Oberheim DMX began to replace the "funky drummers" of the past, and the slap and pop style of bass playing were often replaced by synth keyboard basslines. Lyrics of funk songs began to change from suggestive double entendres to more graphic and sexually explicit content.

Influenced by Kraftwerk and Yellow Magic Orchestra, American hip-hop DJ Afrika Bambaataa developed electro-funk, a minimalist machine-driven style of funk with his single "Planet Rock" in 1982. Also known simply as electro, this style of funk was driven by synthesizers and the electronic rhythm of the TR-808 drum machine. The single "Renegades of Funk" followed in 1983. Michael Jackson was also influenced by electro-funk. In the 1980s, techno-funk music used the TR-808 programmable drum machine, while Kraftwerk and Yellow Magic Orchestra influenced electro-funk artists such as Afrika Bambaataa and Mantronix.

Rick James was the first funk musician of the 1980s to assume the funk mantle dominated by P-Funk in the 1970s. His 1981 album Street Songs, with the singles "Give It to Me Baby" and "Super Freak", resulted in James becoming a star, and paved the way for the future direction of explicitness in funk.

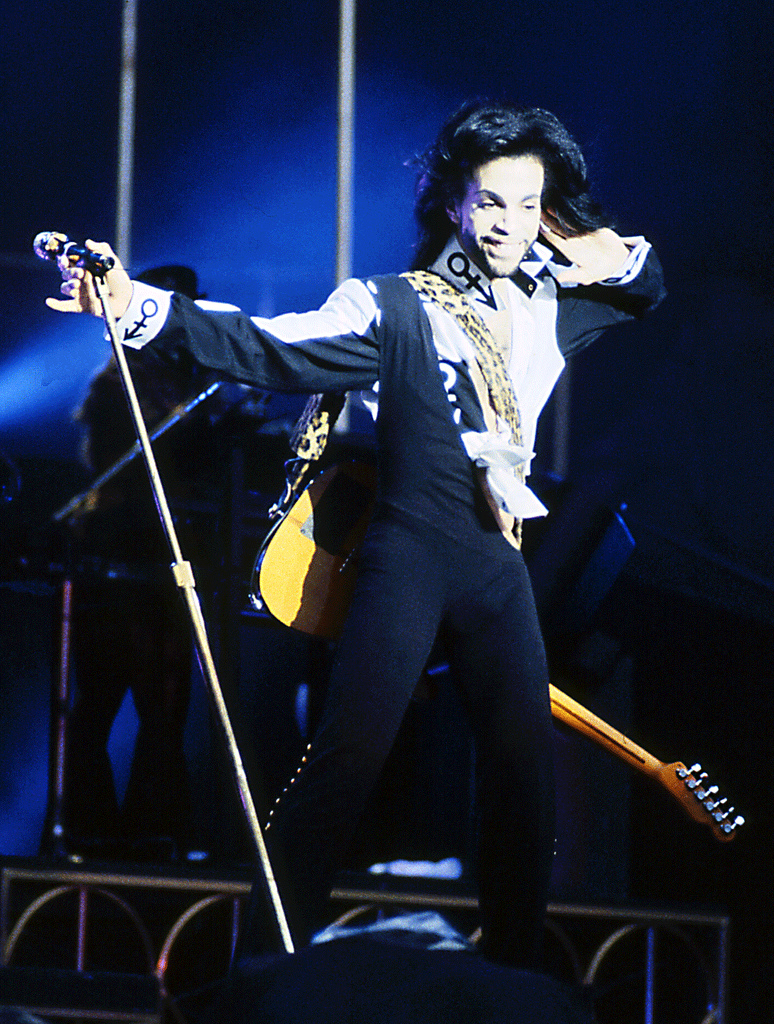
Prince was an influential multi-instrumentalist, bandleader, singer and songwriter.

Prince formed the Time, originally conceived as an opening act for him and based on his "Minneapolis sound", a hybrid mixture of funk, R&B, rock, pop and new wave. Eventually, the band went on to define their own style of stripped-down funk based on tight musicianship and sexual themes.

Similar to Prince, other bands emerged during the P-Funk era and began to incorporate uninhibited sexuality, dance-oriented themes, synthesizers and other electronic technologies to continue to craft funk hits. These included Cameo, Zapp, the Gap Band, the Bar-Kays, and the Dazz Band, who all found their biggest hits in the early 1980s. By the latter half of the 1980s, pure funk had lost its commercial impact; however, pop artists from Michael Jackson to Culture Club often used funk beats.

=== Late 1980s to 2000s nu-funk ===
While funk was driven away from radio by slick commercial hip-hop, contemporary R&B and new jack swing, artists such as Cameo still received major airplay. Rock bands began adopting elements of funk into their sound, creating new combinations of "funk rock" and "funk metal". The Red Hot Chili Peppers, Primus and Faith No More exhibited the fusion of funk with rock and metal.

In the 1990s, artists like Me'shell Ndegeocello, Brooklyn Funk Essentials and the (predominantly UK-based) acid jazz movement—including artists and bands such as Jamiroquai, Incognito, Galliano, Omar, Los Tetas and the Brand New Heavies—carried on with strong elements of funk. However, they never came close to reaching the commercial success of funk in its heyday—with the exception of Jamiroquai, whose album Travelling Without Moving sold about 7 million units worldwide and remains the best-selling funk album in history. Meanwhile, in Australia and New Zealand, bands playing the pub circuit, such as Supergroove, Skunkhour and the Truth, preserved a more instrumental form of funk.

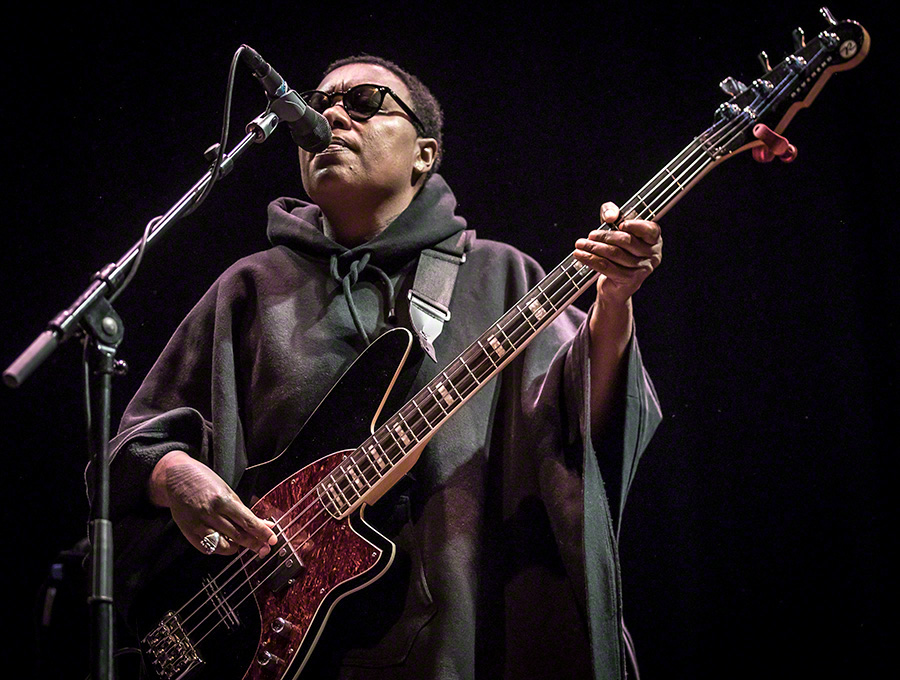
Me'shell Ndegeocello playing electric bass

Since the late 1980s, hip-hop artists have regularly sampled old funk tunes. James Brown is said to be the most sampled artist in the history of hip-hop, while George Clinton is the second most sampled artist; samples of old Parliament and Funkadelic songs formed the basis of West Coast G-funk.

Original beats that feature funk-styled bass or rhythm guitar riffs are also not uncommon. Dr. Dre (considered the progenitor of the G-funk genre) has freely acknowledged to being heavily influenced by George Clinton's psychedelia: "Back in the 70s that's all people were doing: getting high, wearing Afros, bell-bottoms and listening to Parliament-Funkadelic. That's why I called my album The Chronic and based my music and the concepts like I did: because his shit was a big influence on my music. Very big". Digital Underground was a large contributor to the rebirth of funk in the 1990s by educating their listeners with knowledge about the history of funk and its artists. George Clinton branded Digital Underground as "Sons of the P", as their second full-length release is also titled. DU's first release, Sex Packets, was full of funk samples, with the most widely known, "The Humpty Dance", sampling Parliament's "Let's Play House". A very strong funk album of DU's was their 1996 release Future Rhythm. Much of contemporary club dance music, drum and bass in particular has heavily sampled funk drum breaks.

Funk is a major element of certain artists identified with the jam band scene of the late 1990s and 2000s. In the late 1990s, the band Phish developed a live sound called "cow funk" (a.k.a. "space funk"), which consisted of extended danceable deep bass grooves, and often emphasized heavy "wah" pedal and other psychedelic effects from the guitar player and layered Clavinet from the keyboard player. Phish began playing funkier jams in their sets around 1996, and 1998's The Story of the Ghost was heavily influenced by funk. While Phish's funk was traditional in the sense that it often accented beat 1 of the 4/4 time signature, it was also highly exploratory and involved building jams towards energetic peaks before transitioning into highly composed progressive rock and roll.

Since the mid-1990s the nu-funk or funk revivalist scene, centered on the deep funk collectors scene, is producing new material influenced by the sounds of rare funk 45s. Labels include Soul Fire, Daptone, and more. These labels often release on 45 rpm records. Although specializing in music for rare funk DJs, there has been some crossover into the mainstream music industry, such as Sharon Jones' 2005 appearance on Late Night with Conan O'Brien. Those who mix acid jazz, acid house, trip hop, and other genres with funk include Tom Tom Club, Brainticket, Groove Armada, et al.

=== 2010s funktronica ===
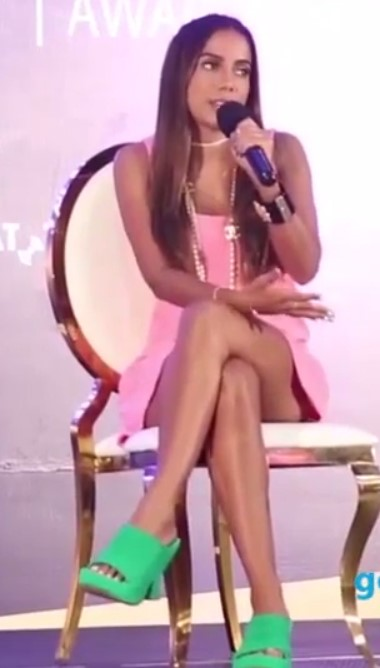
Anitta at the Coca-Cola Jeans parade in November 2014

During the 2000s and early 2010s, some punk funk bands such as Out Hud and Mongolian MonkFish performed in the indie rock scene. Indie band Rilo Kiley, in keeping with their tendency to explore a variety of rockish styles, incorporated funk into their song "The Moneymaker" on the album Under the Blacklight. Prince, with his later albums, gave a rebirth to the funk sound with songs like "The Everlasting Now", "Musicology", "Ol' Skool Company", and "Black Sweat". Particle, for instance, is part of a scene which combined the elements of digital music made with computers, synthesizers, and samples with analog instruments, sounds, and improvisational and compositional elements of funk.

== Derivatives ==
From the early 1970s onwards, funk has developed various subgenres. While George Clinton and the Parliament were making a harder variation of funk, bands such as Kool and the Gang, Ohio Players and Earth, Wind and Fire were making disco-influenced funk music. Amadou & Mariam also produced music that blended traditional Malian sounds with rock guitars, Syrian violins, Cuban trumpets, Egyptian ney, Indian tablas, and Dogon percussion. These elements were called "Afro-Funk".

=== Funk rock ===
Funk rock (also written as funk-rock or funk/rock) fuses funk and rock elements. Its earliest incarnation was heard in the late 1960s through the mid-1970s by musicians such as Jimi Hendrix, Frank Zappa, Gary Wright, David Bowie, Mother's Finest, and Funkadelic on their earlier albums.

Many instruments may be incorporated into funk rock, but the overall sound is defined by a definitive bass or drum beat and electric guitars. The bass and drum rhythms are influenced by funk music but with more intensity, while the guitar can be funk- or rock-influenced, usually with distortion. Prince, Jesse Johnson, Red Hot Chili Peppers and Fishbone are major artists in funk rock.

=== Avant-funk ===
The term "avant-funk" has been used to describe acts who combined funk with art rock's concerns. Simon Frith described the style as an application of progressive rock mentality to rhythm rather than melody and harmony. Simon Reynolds characterized avant-funk as a kind of psychedelia in which "oblivion was to be attained not through rising above the body, rather through immersion in the physical, self loss through animalism."

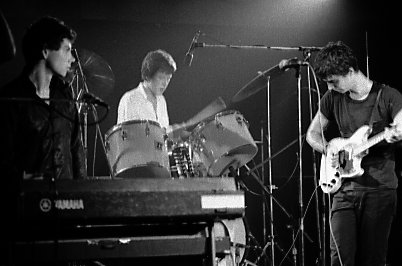
Talking Heads combined funk with elements of art rock.

Acts in the genre include German krautrock band Can and American funk artists Sly Stone and George Clinton. A wave of early 1980s UK and US post-punk artists (including Public Image Ltd, Talking Heads, the Pop Group, Gang of Four, Bauhaus, Cabaret Voltaire, Defunkt, A Certain Ratio, and 23 Skidoo) embraced black dance music styles such as disco and funk. The artists of the late 1970s New York no wave scene also explored avant-funk, influenced by figures such as Ornette Coleman. Reynolds noted these artists' preoccupations with issues such as alienation, repression and technocracy of Western modernity.

=== Go-go ===
Go-go originated in the Washington, D.C., area with which it remains associated, along with other spots in the Mid-Atlantic. Inspired by singers such as Chuck Brown, the "Godfather of Go-go", it is a blend of funk, rhythm and blues, and early hip-hop, with a focus on lo-fi percussion instruments and in-person jamming in place of dance tracks. As such, it is primarily a dance music with an emphasis on live audience call and response. Go-go rhythms are also incorporated into street percussion.

=== Boogie ===
Boogie is an electronic music mainly influenced by funk and post-disco. The minimalist approach of boogie, consisting of synthesizers and keyboards, helped to establish electro and house music. Boogie, unlike electro, emphasizes the slapping techniques of bass guitar but also bass synthesizers. Artists include Vicky "D", Komiko, Peech Boys, Kashif, and later Evelyn King.

=== Electro funk ===
Electro funk is a hybrid of electronic music and funk. It essentially follows the same form as funk, and retains funk's characteristics, but is made entirely (or partially) with a use of electronic instruments such as the TR-808. Vocoders or talkboxes were commonly implemented to transform the vocals. The pioneering electro band Zapp commonly used such instruments in their music. Bootsy Collins also began to incorporate a more electronic sound on later solo albums. Other artists include Herbie Hancock, Afrika Bambaataa, Egyptian Lover, Vaughan Mason & Crew, Midnight Star and Cybotron.

=== Funk metal ===
Funk metal (sometimes typeset differently such as funk-metal) is a fusion genre of music which emerged in the 1980s, as part of the alternative metal movement. It typically incorporates elements of funk and heavy metal (often thrash metal), and in some cases other styles, such as punk and experimental music. It features hard-driving heavy metal guitar riffs, the pounding bass rhythms characteristic of funk, and sometimes hip-hop-style rhymes into an alternative rock approach to songwriting. A primary example is the all-African-American rock band Living Colour, who have been said to be "funk-metal pioneers" by Rolling Stone. During the late 1980s and early 1990s, the style was most prevalent in California – particularly Los Angeles and San Francisco.

=== G-funk ===
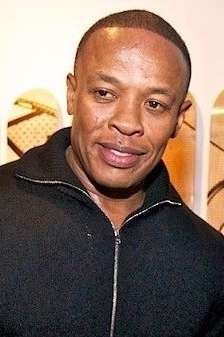
Dr. Dre (pictured in 2011) was one of the influential creators of G-funk.

G-funk is a fusion genre of music which combines gangsta rap and funk. It is generally considered to have been invented by West Coast rappers and made famous by Dr. Dre. It incorporates multi-layered and melodic synthesizers, slow hypnotic grooves, a deep bass, background female vocals, the extensive sampling of P-Funk tunes, and a high-pitched portamento saw wave synthesizer lead. Unlike other earlier rap acts that also utilized funk samples (such as EPMD and the Bomb Squad), G-funk often used fewer, unaltered samples per song.

=== Timba funk ===
Timba is a form of funky Cuban popular dance music. By 1990, several Cuban bands had incorporated elements of funk and hip-hop into their arrangements, and expanded upon the instrumentation of the traditional conjunto with an American drum set, saxophones and a two-keyboard format. Timba bands like La Charanga Habanera or Bamboleo often have horns or other instruments playing short parts of tunes by Earth, Wind and Fire, Kool and the Gang or other U.S. funk bands. While many funk motifs exhibit a clave-based structure, they are created intuitively, without a conscious intent of aligning the various parts to a guide-pattern. Timba incorporates funk motifs into an overt and intentional clave structure.

== Social impact ==
=== Women and funk ===
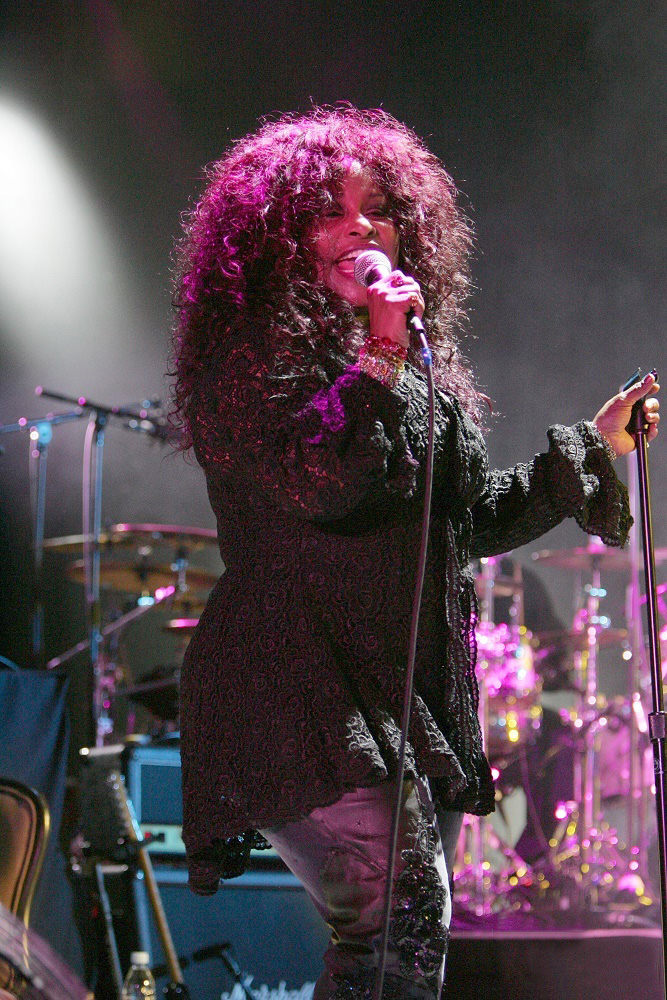
Chaka Khan (born 1953) has been called the "Queen of Funk".

Despite funk's popularity in modern music, few people have examined the work of funk women. Notable funk women include Chaka Khan, Labelle, Brides of Funkenstein, Klymaxx, Mother's Finest, Lyn Collins, Betty Davis and Teena Marie. As cultural critic Cheryl Keyes explains in her essay "She Was Too Black for Rock and Too Hard for Soul: (Re)discovering the Musical Career of Betty Mabry Davis", most of the scholarship around funk has focused on the cultural work of men. She states that "Betty Davis is an artist whose name has gone unheralded as a pioneer in the annals of funk and rock. Most writing on these musical genres has traditionally placed male artists like Jimi Hendrix, George Clinton (of Parliament-Funkadelic), and bassist Larry Graham as trendsetters in the shaping of a rock music sensibility."

In The Feminist Funk Power of Betty Davis and Renée Stout, Nikki A. Greene notes that Davis' provocative and controversial style helped her rise to popularity in the 1970s as she focused on sexually motivated, self-empowered subject matter. Greene also notes that Davis was never made an official spokesperson or champion for the civil rights and feminist movements of the time, although more recently her work has become a symbol of sexual liberation for women of color. Davis' song "If I'm In Luck I Just Might Get Picked Up", on her self-titled debut album, sparked controversy, and was banned by the Detroit NAACP. Maureen Mahan, a musicologist and anthropologist, examines Davis' impact on the music industry and the American public in her article "They Say She's Different: Race, Gender, Genre, and the Liberated Black Femininity of Betty Davis".

Laina Dawes, the author of What Are You Doing Here: A Black Woman's Life and Liberation in Heavy Metal, believes respectability politics is the reason artists like Davis do not get the same recognition as their male counterparts: "I blame what I call respectability politics as part of the reason the funk-rock some of the women from the '70s aren't better known. Despite the importance of their music and presence, many of the funk-rock females represented the aggressive behavior and sexuality that many people were not comfortable with."

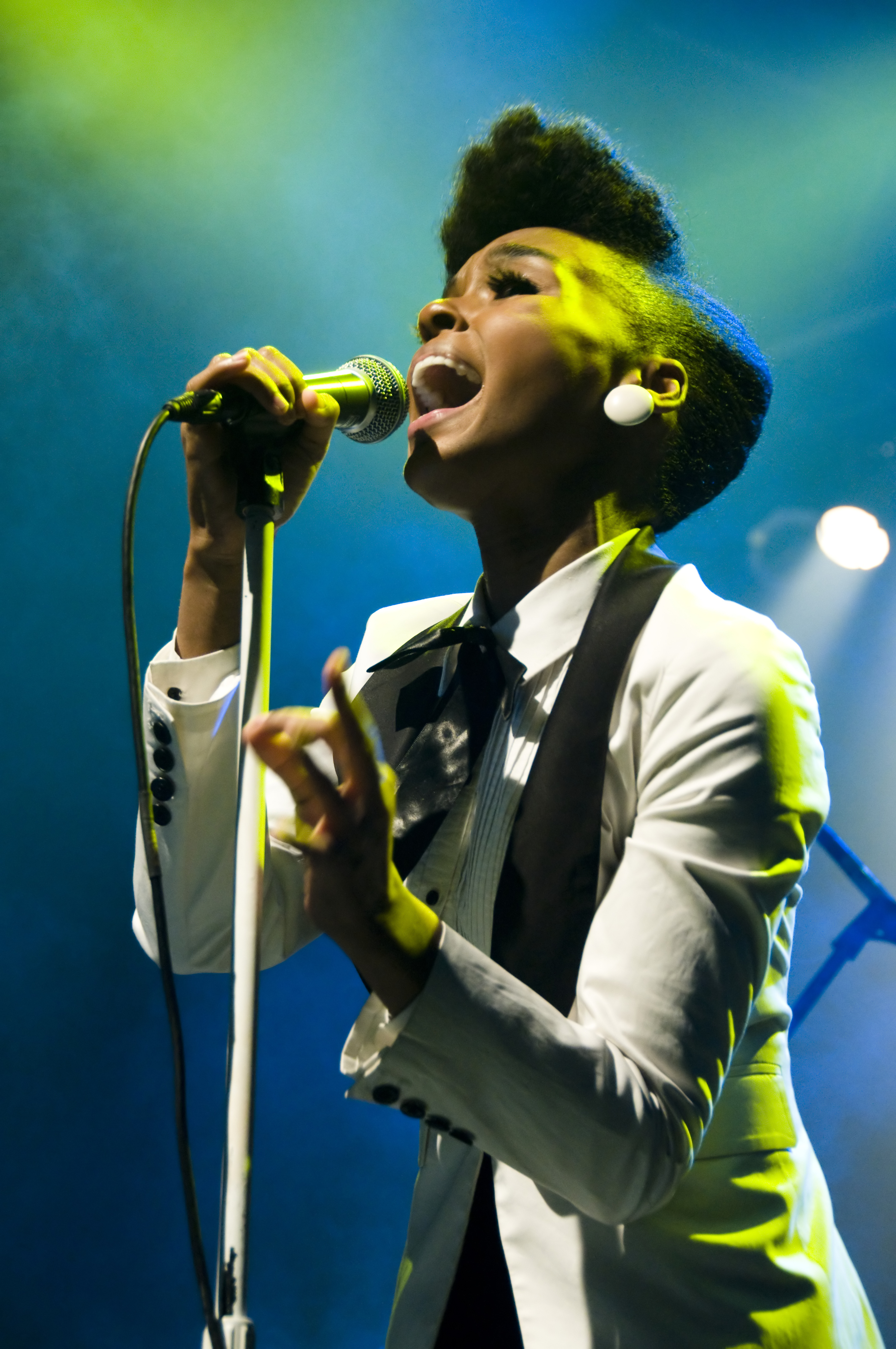
Janelle Monáe (born 1985) is part of a new wave of female funk artists.

According to Francesca T. Royster, Rickey Vincent, in his book Funk: The Music, The People, and The Rhythm of The One, analyzes the impact of Labelle but only in limited sections. Royster criticizes Vincent's analysis of the group, stating: "It is a shame, then, that Vincent gives such minimal attention to Labelle's performances in his study. This reflects, unfortunately, a still consistent sexism that shapes the evaluation of funk music. In Funk, Vincent's analysis of Labelle is brief—sharing a single paragraph with the Pointer Sisters in his three-page sub chapter, 'Funky Women.' He writes that while 'Lady Marmalade' 'blew the lid off of the standards of sexual innuendo and skyrocketed the group's star status,' the band's 'glittery image slipped into the disco undertow and was ultimately wasted as the trio broke up in search of solo status" (Vincent, 1996, 192). Many female artists who are considered to be in the genre of funk, also share songs in the disco, soul, and R&B genres; some believe Labelle falls into this category of women who are split among genres due to a critical view of music theory and the history of sexism in the United States.

In the 21st century, artists like Janelle Monáe have opened the doors for more scholarship and analysis on the female impact on the funk music genre. Monáe's style bends concepts of gender, sexuality, and self-expression in a manner similar to the way some male pioneers in funk broke boundaries. Her albums center on Afro-futuristic concepts, centering on elements of female and black empowerment and visions of a dystopian future. In his article "Janelle Monáe and Afro-sonic Feminist Funk", Matthew Valnes writes that Monae's involvement in the funk genre is juxtaposed with the traditional view of funk as a male-centered genre. Valnes acknowledges that funk is male-dominated, but provides insight to the societal circumstances that led to this situation.

Monáe's influences include her mentor Prince, Funkadelic, Lauryn Hill, and other funk and R&B artists, but according to Emily Lordi, "[Betty] Davis is seldom listed among Janelle Monáe's many influences, and certainly the younger singer's high-tech concepts, virtuosic performances, and meticulously produced songs are far removed from Davis's proto-punk aesthetic. But... like Davis, she also is closely linked with a visionary male mentor (Prince). The title of Monáe's 2013 album, The Electric Lady, alludes to Hendrix's Electric Ladyland, but it also implicitly cites the coterie of women that inspired Hendrix himself: that group, called the Cosmic Ladies or Electric Ladies, was together led by Hendrix's lover Devon Wilson and Betty Davis."

== See also ==
- Chanking
