= Rukaiya Russell =

Rukaiya Russell is a British musician and producer, specialising in house music and the genre known as UK funky. In 2008 she released the track "Bring Back The Routemaster" on Ruru Records. Her music has been featured on BBC 1Xtra.
