= Shinsei Kamattechan =

Japanese rock band

- Origin: Chiba, Japan
- Genres: Pop rock; noise rock; alternative rock; electronica; avant-garde; indie rock
- Years active: 2007–present
- Labels: Perfect Music (2010); Warner Music Japan (Unborde) (2010–present); Pony Canyon Inc. (2017, 2020)
- Members: Yukiya Kaidō (Mono); Ryōsuke Ōshima (Noko); Misako Suzuki (Misako); Yūnosuke
- Past members: Abesho; Sanshiro; Daisaku Sakuma (Chibagin)
- Website: shinseikamattechan.jp

Shinsei Kamattechan (神聖かまってちゃん) is a Japanese rock band from Chiba, formed in 2007. The band consists of Noko (lead vocals, guitar, keyboards, programming, composition), Mono (leader, keyboards, programming, tambourine), Misako (drums) and Yūnosuke (bass, chorus). They describe themselves as an "Internet Pop Rock Band", which reflects the blend of pop melodies and piano with dark lyrics and punk rock sensibilities found within their music, as well as the band's long history of broadcasting both live performances and aspects of their daily lives on the Internet.

== History ==
The band have grown an organic fanbase through live streams and the online publication of home-made music videos, which is unusual in Japan. They released their debut studio album, Tomodachi wo Koroshite Made (友だちを殺してまで, 'To Kill a Friend'), on 10 March 2010, on the indie label Perfect Music, which is run by their management company of the same name. Their first single, "Yūgata no Piano" (夕方のピアノ, 'Evening Piano'), was released on 7 July 2010.

They later gained a deal with major label Warner Music Japan, and released their major label debut album Tsumanne (つまんね, 'Boring') on 22 December 2010. On the same day, they also released the album Minna Shine (みんな死ね, 'Everyone Die') on Perfect Music.

In 2011, the group performed the opening theme song for the Japanese anime series Ground Control to Psychoelectric Girl, titled "Os-Uchūjin" (Os-宇宙人, 'Os-Alien'). Vocals were provided by voice actress Asuka Ōgame, and a single was released on 27 April 2011, under the name Erio wo Kamattechan. On 31 August 2011, they released their fourth studio album, 8-gatsu 32-nichi e (8月32日へ, 'To August 32nd').

The fictional movie Gekijōban Shinsei Kamattechan/Rock 'n' Roll wa Nariyamanai (劇場版・神聖かまってちゃん／ロックンロールは鳴り止まないっ, Ringing in Their Ears), revolving around a dramatized version of the band with the members played by themselves, was directed by Yu Irie and released by Spotted Productions in Japan on 2 April 2011. The film had its international premiere at the 2011 New York Asian Film Festival, with the English title Ringing in Their Ears.

In March 2012, the group released a single in collaboration with B.B.Queens under the name B.B. Kamattechan, covering the group's 1993 single "Yume no END wa Itsumo Mezamashi!" (夢のENDはいつも目覚まし!, 'An Alarm Clock Always Ends My Dream!'). This was followed by the group's first major original single "Chie-chan no Seisho" (知恵ちゃんの聖書, 'Chie-chan's Bible') in October 2012, and the release of their fifth studio album, Tanoshiine (楽しいね, 'It's Fun'), on 14 November 2012.

The following year saw lead vocalist, guitarist, and composer Noko engage in solo activities, contributing vocals to an opening theme of the 2013 anime adaptation of the Japanese manga The Flowers of Evil, and releasing a solo album, Shinsei Kamattechan (神聖かまってちゃん). The album, sharing its title with the band's name, was released on 11 September 2013, and contained self-covers with new arrangements of Shinsei Kamattechan songs.

In March 2014, the group released a DVD containing live footage from the years 2009 - 2013, titled Shinsei Kamattechan Live History 2009-2013 (神聖かまってちゃん ライブ・ヒストリー2009-2013), followed by their second major single in April, "Front Memory" (フロントメモリー, Furontomemorī), featuring vocals by Makoto Kawamoto. Two more singles, "Robot no Yoru" (ロボットノ夜, 'Night of the Robots'), and "Zuttomo" (ズッ友, 'Forever Friends'), were released consecutively in the months of May and June, with the former released exclusively on digital platforms. Their sixth album was released on 10 September 2014, titled Eiyū syndrome (英雄syndrome, 'Hero Syndrome').

Celebrating five years since their CD debut, the band released Best Kamattechan (ベストかまってちゃん), their first "best of" compilation album, in 2015. It contained tracks selected from each of their six previous studio albums, with the limited edition of the release containing live footage and additional tracks, covered by artists such as Dempagumi.inc, Sumire Uesaka, and tofubeats.

2016 saw the release of the group's first new original content in two years, Natsu.Install (夏.インストール, 'Summer.Installation'), their seventh studio album, released on 6 July. In an effort to promote the album, the members climbed Mount Fuji in costumed attire during a live broadcast on the streaming website TwitCasting, reaching the peak on 1 July.

In April 2017, their song "Yūgure no Tori" (夕暮れの鳥, 'Twilight Birds') was used as the ending theme song for the second season of the anime series Attack on Titan. The song was released as the double A-Side single "Yūgure no Tori / Hikari no Kotoba" (夕暮れの鳥 / 光の言葉, 'Twilight Birds / Words of Light') under the Pony Canyon label in May 2017, with cover art illustrated by Attack on Titan manga artist Hajime Isayama. Their eighth studio album was released on 6 September 2017, with the title Osanasa wo Nyuin Sasete (幼さを入院させて, 'Hospitalize my Childishness').

The group's song "Front Memory" was chosen to serve as the theme song for the 2018 live-action theatrical adaptation of the Japanese manga After the Rain, covered by singer Emiko Suzuki and arranged by Seiji Kameda, with band members Noko and Mono additionally contributing to the film's soundtrack. Their 9th studio album, Tsun×Dere (ツン×デレ, Tsundere), was released on 4 July 2018, with the song "Akizora Cider" (秋空サイダー, 'Autumn Sky Cider') featuring vocals by Regal Lily vocalist and guitarist Honoka Takahashi.

2018 also saw the band celebrate the 10th anniversary of activities with their lineup at the time, with the final date of the 33-sai no Natsuyasumi Tour (33才の夏休みツアー, 33 Year Old's Summer Vacation Tour), held on 20 October 2018, receiving a commemorative DVD release and an accompanying promotional tour. The DVD was sold online and at live venues during the tour, held from 18 to 29 March 2019, with the title Shinsei Kamattechan 10th Anniversary! "33 Year Old's Summer Vacation Tour" Finale@Studio Coast (神聖かまってちゃん10周年っ！「33才の夏休みツアー」ツアーファイナル＠STUDIO COAST).

In August 2019, the band released the digital single "Delay" (ディレイ, Direi), followed by another digital single in October, titled "Mainichi ga News" (毎日がニュース, 'Everyday is News'), which was tied to a promotional campaign with music streaming service Spotify. Their 10th album, Jidō Karte (児童カルテ, Child's Medical Record), was released on digital platforms and streaming services in November 2019, with the physical version being released later on 8 January 2020.

2020 saw the band's lineup change for the first time since 2008, with bassist Chibagin announcing the previous year his intention to withdraw from the band after the conclusion of his final tour in January 2020. In an interview, Chibagin explained his decision to withdraw from the band as being the result of concerns over financial security, expressing his desire to find a stable source of income in order to support his family. His final performance with Shinsei Kamattechan, held on 13 January 2020, would go on to receive a video release, released in November 2020, titled Shinsei Kamattechan "Melancholy×Melancholy" Tour Finale@Zepp DiverCity Tokyo (神聖かまってちゃん「メランコリー×メランコリー」ツアーファイナル@Zepp DiverCity TOKYO ライブ). The band's first tour with their new lineup was scheduled to commence in March 2020, however due to precautions taken to prevent the spread of COVID-19, the tour was postponed until July 2020, with the original dates being replaced by their first entirely online tour, broadcast live from a recording studio. In December 2020, the band returned to perform for the fourth season of the anime series Attack on Titan, with their song "Boku no Sensō" (僕の戦争, 'My War') serving as the season's opening theme. The song was released as a digital single on 22 February 2021 under Pony Canyon Inc., with the cover art once again illustrated by Attack on Titan manga artist Hajime Isayama.

In November 2023, celebrating 15 years since their formation, the band released their second greatest hits album, "Seinaru Kōsaten" (聖なる交差点, 'Holy Crossroads'). The album featured guest appearances by vocalist ACA-Ne from the band Zutomayo, and singer-songwriters Ano and Jun Togawa.

== Media attention ==
Shinsei Kamattechan have received a lot of media attention in Japan, although Noko rarely does interviews. The band particularly drew attention for Noko's erratic behaviour during an August 2011 television appearance on TBS music program ComingSoon!!, with host Masahiro Nakai described by media outlets as being "thrown off balance", however they were invited back to the program for a second appearance in September 2011.

They have also attracted attention from English-language media. They were interviewed (without Noko) in a video on the website of British magazine NME at Summer Sonic 2010, and by The Japan Times newspaper, and their debut album, Tomodachi wo Koroshite Made, was reviewed by Metropolis magazine.

== Broadcasts ==
The band is well known for broadcasting their activity on live streaming video sites such as stickam, PeerCast, TwitCasting, and Japanese popular video sharing website Niconico. The broadcasting methods of band lead Noko are particularly notorious, who gained attention for the live broadcast of an unauthorized performance in front of Shibuya Station, and the subsequent intervention of local law enforcement, in 2010.

== Band members ==
Current members

- Mono (海藤佑希也, Kaidō Yukiya; born 16 December 1985) — leader, keyboards, programming, tambourine
- Noko (の子) (大島亮介, Ōshima Ryōsuke; born 16 June 1985) — lead vocals, guitar, keyboards, programming, song composition
- Misako (みさこ) (鈴木美早子, Suzuki Misako; born 11 October 1985) — drums
- Yūnosuke (ユウノスケ) — bass, chorus

Former members

- Abesho (あべしょ, born 19 September 1984) — guitar, bass
- Sanshirō (サンシロウ) — bass
- Chibagin (ちばぎん) (佐久間大作, Sakuma Daisaku; born 11 December 1985) — bass, chorus – (2008 - 2020)

== Discography ==
=== Albums ===
List of albums, with selected chart positions
Title	Album details	Peak positions
Title	Album details	Oricon Sales Ranking
Tomodachi wo Koroshite Made (友だちを殺してまで; "To Kill a Friend")	Released: 10 March 2010; Label: Perfect Music; Format: CD, digital download	43
Tsumanne (つまんね; "Boring")	Released: 22 December 2010; Label: Warner Music Japan; Formats: CD, digital download	16
Minna Shine (みんな死ね; "Everyone Die")	Released: 22 December 2010; Label: Perfect Music; Formats: CD, digital download	17
8-gatsu 32-nichi e (8月32日へ; "To August 32nd")	Released: 31 August 2011; Label: Warner Music Japan; Formats: CD, digital download	9
Tanoshiine (楽しいね; "It's Fun")	Released: 14 November 2012; Label: Warner Music Japan; Formats: CD, digital download	31
Eiyū syndrome (英雄syndrome; "Hero Syndrome")	Released: 10 September 2014; Label: Warner Music Japan; Formats: CD, digital download	20
Natsu.Install (夏.インストール; "Summer.Installation")	Released: 6 July 2016; Label: Warner Music Japan; Formats: CD, digital download	28
Osanasa wo Nyuin Sasete (幼さを入院させて; "Hospitalize My Childishness")	Released: 6 September 2017; Label: Warner Music Japan; Formats: CD, digital download	27
Tsun×Dere (ツン×デレ; "Tsundere")	Released: 4 July 2018; Label: Warner Music Japan; Formats: CD, digital download	36
Jidō Karte (児童カルテ; "Child's Medical Record")	Released: 8 January 2020; Label: Warner Music Japan; Formats: Digital download, CD	18
Danchi Thesis (団地テーゼ; "Apartment Complex Thesis")	Released: 15 January 2025; Label: Perfect Music; Formats: Digital download, CD	59

=== Compilations ===
List of compilation albums, with selected chart positions
Title	Album details	Peak positions
Title	Album details	Oricon Sales Ranking
Best Kamattechan (ベストかまってちゃん)	Released: 24 June 2015; Greatest hits compilation album; Label: Warner Music Japan; Formats: CD, digital download	28
Seinaru Kōsaten (聖なる交差点; "Holy Crossroads")	Released: 15 November 2023; Greatest hits compilation album; Label: Warner Music Japan; Formats: CD, digital download	36

=== Singles ===
List of singles as lead artist
Title	Year	Peak positions	Album
Title	Year	Oricon Sales Ranking	Album
Yūgata no Piano (夕方のピアノ; "Evening Piano")	2010	19	Best Kamattechan
Let's go Budokan! (レッツゴー武道館っ!)	2011	Sold only at live concerts	Non-album single
Chie-chan no Seisho (知恵ちゃんの聖書; "Chie-chan's Bible")	2012	20	Tanoshiine
Front Memory (フロントメモリー)	2014	20	Eiyū Syndrome
Robot no Yoru (ロボットノ夜; "Night of the Robots")	2014	Digital release	Eiyū Syndrome
Zuttomo (ズッ友; "Forever Friends")	2014	34	Eiyū Syndrome
Yūgure no Tori / Hikari no Kotoba (夕暮れの鳥 / 光の言葉; "Twilight Birds / Words of Light")	2017	40	Osanasa wo Nyuin Sasete
Delay (ディレイ)	2019	Digital release	Jidō Karte
Mainichi ga News (毎日がニュース; "Everyday is News")	2019	Digital release	Jidō Karte
Boku no Sensō (僕の戦争; "My War")	2021	Digital release	Danchi Thesis
Mukiryoku Boy/ Chūnen Nisshi (無気力ボーイ / 中年日誌; "Apathetic Boy / Middle-Aged Diary")	2026	Digital release	Non-album single
"—" denotes a single that was not released on an album.

=== Collaborations ===
Title	Details	Oricon Sales Ranking
Os-Uchūjin Os-宇宙人 lit. "Os-Alien"	Released: 27 April 2011; Collaborated with Asuka Ōgame, released as Erio wo Kamattechan; Lead track used as the opening theme song for the anime series Ground Control to Psychoelectric Girl; Lyrics and composition by Noko	15
Yume no END wa Itsumo Mezamashi! 夢のENDはいつも目覚まし! lit. "An Alarm Clock Always Ends My Dream!"	Released: 28 March 2012; Collaborated with B.B.Queens, released as B.B.Kamattechan	28

== Awards and nominations ==
Award ceremony	Year	Category	Nominee(s)/work(s)	Result	Ref.
CD Shop Awards	2011	Second Prize	Tomodachi wo Koroshite Made	Won	
MTV Video Music Awards Japan	2011	Best New Artist	"Michinaru Hou e"	Nominated	
6th Crunchyroll Anime Awards	2022	Best Opening	"My War" (from Attack on Titan: The Final Season Part 1 anime)	Won	
