= Chanking =

Guitar performance technique

Chanking is a guitar performance technique in funk music that involves both "choking" the guitar neck and strumming the strings percussively to create a distinctive-sounding riff commonly associated with the genre. The technique was popularized by the music of James Brown, later spreading to other genres and performers.

== Etymology ==
The name "chanking" is either a portmanteau of the words "choking" and "yanking", referring to the procedure involved in the technique, or simply onomatopoeia - a word that sounds like what it describes.

== History ==
Chanking was developed by James Brown band guitarist Jimmy Nolen as a part of his signature "chicken scratch" sound. The technique appeared first with a double-chank on the first backbeat of each bar in "Out of Sight" (1964), and in "Papa's Got a Brand New Bag" (1965), a song that typified much of Brown's subsequent work. "Chicken scratching" itself differs slightly: the fretting hand lightly squeezes the chord on the neck, then releases suddenly to produce a scratch chord. In particular, Brown used chanking against syncopated bass to produce a unique blend of sounds.

The technique of chanking spread from funk to reggae music. Alan Warner, then of The Foundations, also utilized the technique, which left its sound legacy in Europop.
