= My War (song) =

Single by Shinsei Kamattechan
- Language: English; Japanese
- Released: February 22, 2021
- Recorded: 2020
- Genre: Rock
- Length: 4:40
- Label: Pony Canyon
- Songwriter: Noko
- Producer: Noko

Shinsei Kamattechan singles chronology
"Mainichi ga News" (2019)	"My War" (2021)

Audio sample
- file; help

Music video
- "My War" on YouTube

Alternate cover
- TV size version cover

"My War" (Japanese: 僕の戦争, Hepburn: Boku no Sensō) is a song by the Japanese rock band Shinsei Kamattechan. The television edit version of the song was released on December 7, 2020, while the full version was released on February 22, 2021, by Pony Canyon.

== Background and release ==
"My War" is Shinsei Kamattechan's fifteenth single and sixth as a limited release, following "Mainichi ga News" (2019). It was used as the opening theme for the fourth season of the Attack on Titan anime series. It is the second song used in the anime after "Yūgure no Tori" (2017). Like "Yūgure no Tori", the cover of "My War" was drawn by Attack on Titan creator, Hajime Isayama. It features a girl, holding a rifle, dressed in school clothes and standing in the middle of a classroom. She is wearing a construction helmet marked with the kanji 神. In an interview with the Natalie website, Isayama said, "as a loyal fan of Shinsei Kamattechan, I am very happy to see the opening song composed by them."

In an interview with Natalie, band member Noko said, "'My War' is a song that blends all of Shinsei Kamattechan's styles, including intense, deep and subtle, rocking and beautiful. And due to the large budget given in advance by the producer, he was able to incorporate the coveted symphony into the song." Noko later said that Isayama had many things in common with the band, so just like "Yūgure no Tori", it was easy to achieve this collaboration, and it was also related to the dark style of the latest season of Attack on Titan. The singer revealed that the confinement due to the COVID-19 pandemic in Japan also affected the genre of "My War". He indicated that he was in a state of mental and emotional instability in 2020, but noted that it was beneficial and was reflected in the outcome of his work. Regarding some words in the song, Noko denied in a live broadcast that there were Spanish words as speculated by the foreign audience. He also stated that he did not say the word "monster" at the end either.

The release date of "My War" was not announced in advance, but it was released unannounced on December 7, 2020, JST, the day the first episode of the anime aired. Subsequently, Shinsei Kamattechan performed the song for the first time publicly at Net Generation 20 held at Liquidroom in Shibuya, Tokyo on December 27.

== Track listing ==
All tracks are written by Noko.

My War (TV size)
No.	Title	Length
1.	"My War" (僕の戦争)	1:30

My War (Full version)
No.	Title	Length
1.	"My War" (僕の戦争)	4:40
2.	"My War" (instrumental)	4:40
Total length:		9:20

== Personnel ==
Shinsei Kamattechan

- Noko – vocals, guitar, production
- Mono – keyboard
- Misako – drums

Others appearances

- Yukako Shiba – 1st violin
- Yusa – 2nd violin
- Masashi Yamamoto – contrabass
- Akane Suda – clarinet
- Hinako Miyahara – flute, piccolo
- Motomitsu Zakouji – trumpet
- Shinya – trombone
- Sasara Matsuzaki – soprano chorus
- Midori Shimura – alto chorus
- Kazushige Shimura – tenor chorus
- Takehiko Sasaki – bass chorus

Production

- Shinya Mochida – tech
- Makio Hagiya – recording engineer
- Ryo Kanai – recording engineer
- Keiji Kondo – mix engineer

== Charts ==
=== Weekly charts ===
Chart performance for "My War"
Chart (2021)	Peak position
Japan (Oricon)	1
Japan Hot 100 (Billboard)	23
Heatseekers Songs (Billboard Japan)	1
US World Digital Song Sales (Billboard)	10

== Awards ==
Awards and nominations for "My War"
Ceremony	Year	Award	Result	Ref.
6th Crunchyroll Anime Awards	2022	Best Opening Sequence	Won	
