= Funkstep =

Subgenre of UK funky

- Other names: Dubbage
- Stylistic origins: UK funky; dubstep; drumstep; drum and bass; funky house
- Cultural origins: Late 2000s, UK

Funkstep (also known as dubbage) is a style of UK funky, incorporating elements of dubstep and sometimes drum and bass.

== History ==
Since the dubstep movement in 2001, funkstep has gained more listeners and therefore more record producers to produce this music style. Funkstep took shape since 2012 by blending the genres of dubstep, drumstep, drum and bass, UK funky and electro house.

== Characteristics ==
The changes of speed in funkstep are evident, since drumstep will register at anywhere from 150 to 170 BPM as a result of its 2-step beat and French and electro house by contrast between 120 and 130 BPM. This problem is usually solved by playing the song during its drumstep or even dubstep parts in half speed, as compared to the occurring house in similar parts.

Most funkstep songs start with calm intros, which can sometimes be mixed up with drumstep because of its dubstep and drum and bass-like drums. But after starting with a typical funkstep riff and changing the bassdrum to a consistent four on the floor, it is easy to recognize the bridge to more complex house music, which is typical for a funkstep song. A song can contain these bridges and changes repeatedly, which mostly indicate the drops and highlights. Funkstep is also often associated with glitch because of its arsenal of distorted sounds.

Since funkstep contains parts sounding similar to different variations of house, drum and bass and drumstep, it is attractive for listeners of several styles of music and pretty diverse.

Since 2009, notable scene reports were trying to simply explain the idea of funkstep to the audience, posting headlines like "Dubstep + Funky House = Funkstep".
