= Funky house =

Subgenre of house music

- Stylistic origins: House; disco; funk; boogie
- Cultural origins: Late 1980s, United States
- Derivative forms: UK funky

Other topics
- Nu-disco; nu-funk; G-funk; French house; future funk

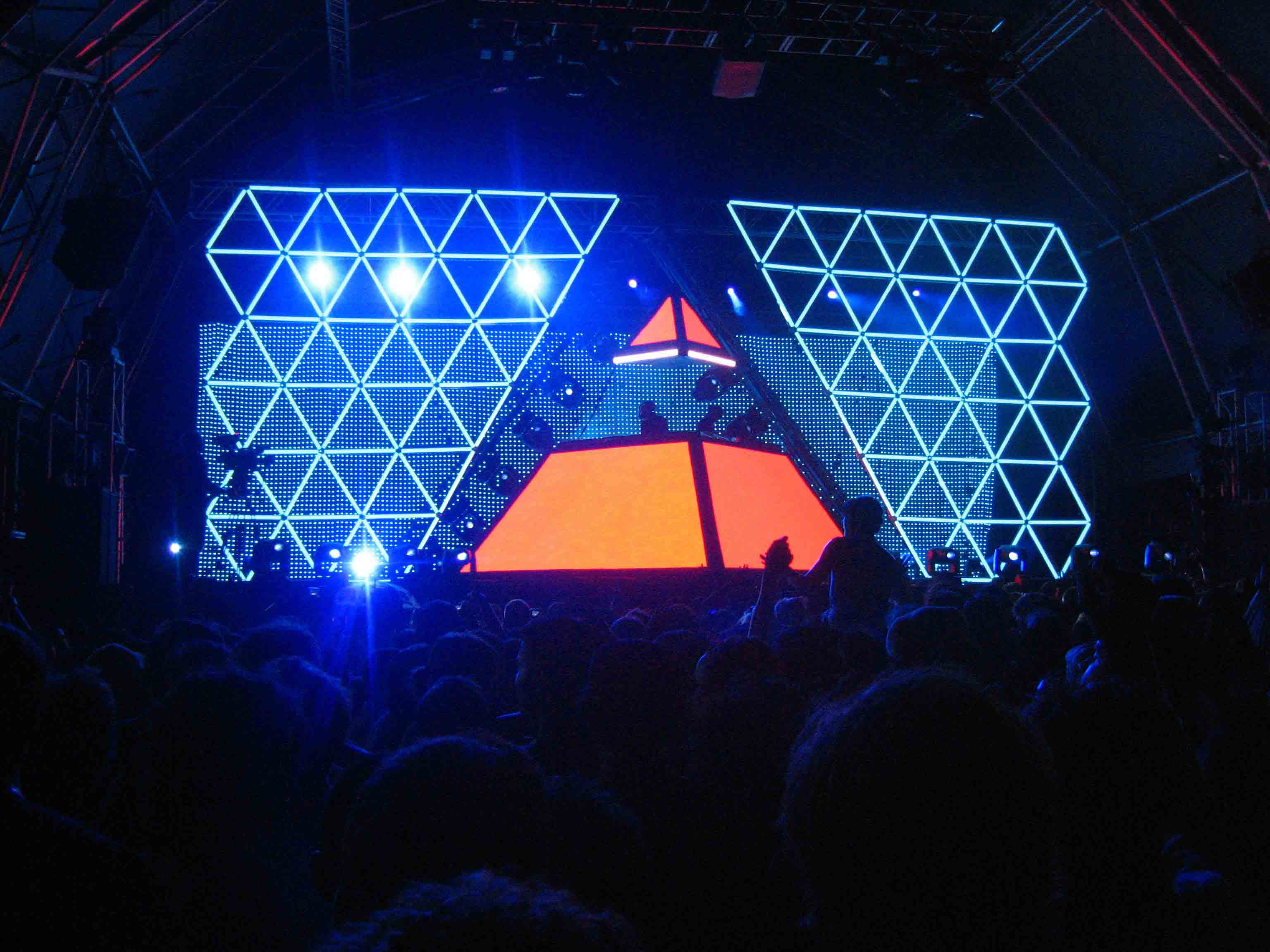
Daft Punk during a concert on July 15, 2006, in Barcelona

Funky house is a subgenre of house music that uses disco and funk samples, a funk-inspired bass line or a strong soul influence, combined with drum breaks that draw inspiration from 1970s and 1980s funk records. It often includes disco strings, though not consistently. Recognized by its specific sound, Funky house is characterized by basslines, swooshes, swirls, and other synthesized sounds which give the music a bouncy tempo. Overall, it has influenced the development of several other subgenres, such as tech house, nu-disco, and UK funky, which have borrowed its rhythmic elements and upbeat energy.

== Production and characteristics ==
Funky house music draws inspiration from the rhythmic complexity and soulful vibe of 1970s and 1980s funk and disco. Key production characteristics include disco strings, funk-inspired basslines, vocal samples, and tempo and synth effects.

A description of those characteristics features lush, orchestral disco strings that contribute to a vibrant and immersive sound. The deep, groovy basslines provide rhythmic depth, creating a compelling foundation for each track. The genre often incorporates vocal loops or samples from older soul and disco records, blending familiar elements with fresh, innovative twists. Typically produced at around 128 BPM, funky house tracks are characterized by synthesized effects such as swooshes, swirls, and filters, lending the music a bouncy, uplifting vibe that defines its unique energy.

== History ==
=== 1990s ===
Funky house gained initial popularity in the 1990s, with artists such as Daft Punk helping popularize the style through tracks like "Around the World" and "One More Time". These tracks incorporated repetitive, groove-heavy basslines with soulful, filtered vocals, becoming defining features of the genre. Thomas Bangalter, a member of Daft Punk, founded the label Roulé, making a conscious effort to distinguish funky house from other house subgenres by blending classic funk with modern production techniques.

=== 2000s ===
The genre generated significant success in the early and mid-2000s. Its influence spread across global club scenes, with popular record labels such as Defected Records, Ministry of Sound, Hed Kandi, and Fierce Angel releasing compilation albums dedicated to funky house. Notable compilation series include Defected's "In the House" and Hed Kandi's "Beach House." Artists like Joey Negro (Dave Lee), Armand van Helden, and DJ Sneak played crucial roles in shaping the genre's sound, blending funk, soul, and house into vibrant, feel-good music that resonated worldwide.

=== 2010s–present ===
With the growing interest in funk and disco in the early 2010s, a new wave of music incorporating funk and disco samples emerged. However, some argue that the evolving sound structure diverged from traditional funky house characteristics, leading to what some refer to as funk-house. Ultimately, these titles are interchangeable. While some see this development as a misinterpretation, others believe that funky house's influence is evident in modern deep and tech house productions. Certain modern producers have kept the tradition alive by remixing classic tracks, maintaining its relevance in contemporary club culture.

== Influence on Modern Music ==
Funky house's influence is visible across various modern house subgenres. Its uplifting nature has become intertwined with contemporary deep house and tech house, with many producers incorporating funk-influenced basslines and disco-inspired samples. While tech house is generally less vocal-centric than funky house, it sometimes uses vocal loops or snippets reminiscent of soulful, disco-inspired samples. These vocals are usually chopped and looped, blending seamlessly into the percussive structure of tech house, maintaining the genre's energetic feel with a driving beat prioritizing dance-floor appeal.

=== Tech house ===
Tech house often uses repetitive, groove-focused basslines that draw directly from funky house. However, while funky house features rich, bouncy basslines, tech house basslines are typically more restrained and minimalistic, aligning with its techno-inspired aesthetic.

A notable example of blending tech and funky house is "You Little Beauty" by Fisher (musician) (2019). The track incorporates soulful influences through sampled vocals reminiscent of disco-inspired funky house. The groovy bassline and upbeat energy nod to the funky house tradition, despite its classification as tech house.

Another example includes "The Movement" by Matroda (2020), where the song "In and Out of My Life" by Adeva (1988) was sampled. Like many funky house tracks, "The Movement" uses vocal samples from older recordings. The vocal cuts are manipulated to add a rhythmic, chant-like quality that aligns with the disco-funk tradition of reworking older material to create something fresh and danceable. This is a key technique in both funky house and tech house, blending nostalgia with modern beats.

=== Deep house ===
Although rooted in Chicago house music from the 1980s, deep house further evolved by the 2000s. It often features disco influences, tying it to funky house through shared characteristics like distinct basslines, rhythmic grooves, and soulful sampling techniques. However, deep house usually presents these elements in a more laid-back manner. While funky house is known for its bouncy, dance-floor tempo (around 128 BPM), deep house typically has a slower tempo (115–125 BPM). This contrast allows for cross-genre remixes and collaborations, bridging the energetic vibe of funky house with deep house's introspective ambiance.

"Love Tonight" by Shouse exemplifies a deep house track with a groove-focused, repetitive bassline that creates warmth and depth. The anthem-like vocals build a communal, uplifting energy often seen in funky house tracks. The call-and-response structure and harmonized vocal loops lend a familiar, soulful vibe, making it both introspective and danceable—a hallmark of both deep and funky house.
