= UK funky =

Genre of electronic dance music from the UK

- Stylistic origins: Soulful house; afro house; Afrobeat; funky house; soca; tribal house; UK garage; broken beat; grime
- Cultural origins: Mid-2000s, London, United Kingdom
- Typical instruments: Sequencer; turntables; samplers; drum machine; personal computer

Subgenres
- Funkstep

Fusion genres
- UK bass

UK funky (sometimes known as UKF or funky) is a genre of electronic dance music which originated in the United Kingdom that is heavily influenced by soca, soulful house, tribal house, funky house, UK garage, broken beat and grime. Typically, UK funky blends beats, bass loops and synths with African and Latin percussion in the dembow rhythm with contemporary R&B-style vocals.

== Characteristics ==
UK funky uses tempos of around 130bpm. Drum patterns vary between tracks, using either "4 to the floor" or a syncopated style. The drum patterns commonly also include percussion playing American inspired rhythms. Instrumentation varies widely, but drum machines and synthesizers are common. There are similarities to garage in rhythmic, musical and vocal styles. UK funky is highly influenced by the tribal, soulful and bassline house subgenres. Similar genres include afro house, broken beat, electro and garage.

== History ==
US house producers such as Masters At Work, Karizma (with "Twyst This"), Quentin Harris and Dennis Ferrer (with a remix of Fish Go Deep's "The Cure and the Cause"; and with "Hey Hey") have had an influence on UK funky.

Hits from this genre include the Crazy Cousinz songs "Do You Mind?", "Bongo Jam" and "The Funky Anthem", and Fuzzy Logik featuring Egypt's "In The Morning". Popular songs have also produced dance crazes, such as "Heads Shoulders Knees and Toes", "The Tribal Man Skank" and "The Migraine Skank". Other notable artists include Apple, Marcus Nasty, Tribal Magz, Donae'o, KIG, Roska, Champion, iLL BLU, Lil' Silva and Funkystepz. DJs and MCs that have played a role in UK funky include DJ Pioneer, Supa D, MA1, Cameo, NG, MC Kaos Spidey G, Coldstepz, and Dogtaniaun & Versatile.

Funky Dee's "Are You Gonna Bang Doe?", recorded in 2009, achieved mainstream success and was signed to Universal Music Group. It was interpolated by Ed Sheeran in his viral 2010 freestyle alongside Example, the "Nando's Skank", and was later interpolated by Sun Bingo for their 2018 "Are You Gonna Bingo?" advertising campaign. The track was described by Tim Westwood as "the summer soundtrack" which "replaced [Boy Better Know's] "Too Many Man" in the clubs" and by TRENCH Magazine as an "Ayia Napa anthem". Critics included Vice's Sam Diss, who considered it to be one of several tracks "that practically confirmed [UK funky] would soon become the novelty soundtrack to every bad freshers week in the country, eventually leading to its demise", and Marcus Nasty, who claimed it contributed to the genre becoming "kiddies' music".
