= Bass chorus =

Sound effect

Audio demo of chorus effect on bass (dry, then with chorus) with a Sire V7 bass and Ampeg chorus simulation on Amplitube.

A bass chorus is an electronic effect used with the electric bass. It creates the same "shimmering" sound as a chorus effect for electric guitar chorus pedals, which recreates the sound of having multiple instruments doubling the same musical line (as with a string orchestra). The difference is that bass chorus pedals are modified in various ways to suit the low pitch register of the electric bass. While several bass chorus pedal manufacturers have modified the chorus circuit so that it does not affect the lower register, others have designed the effect so that it can have an effect on even very low pitches.

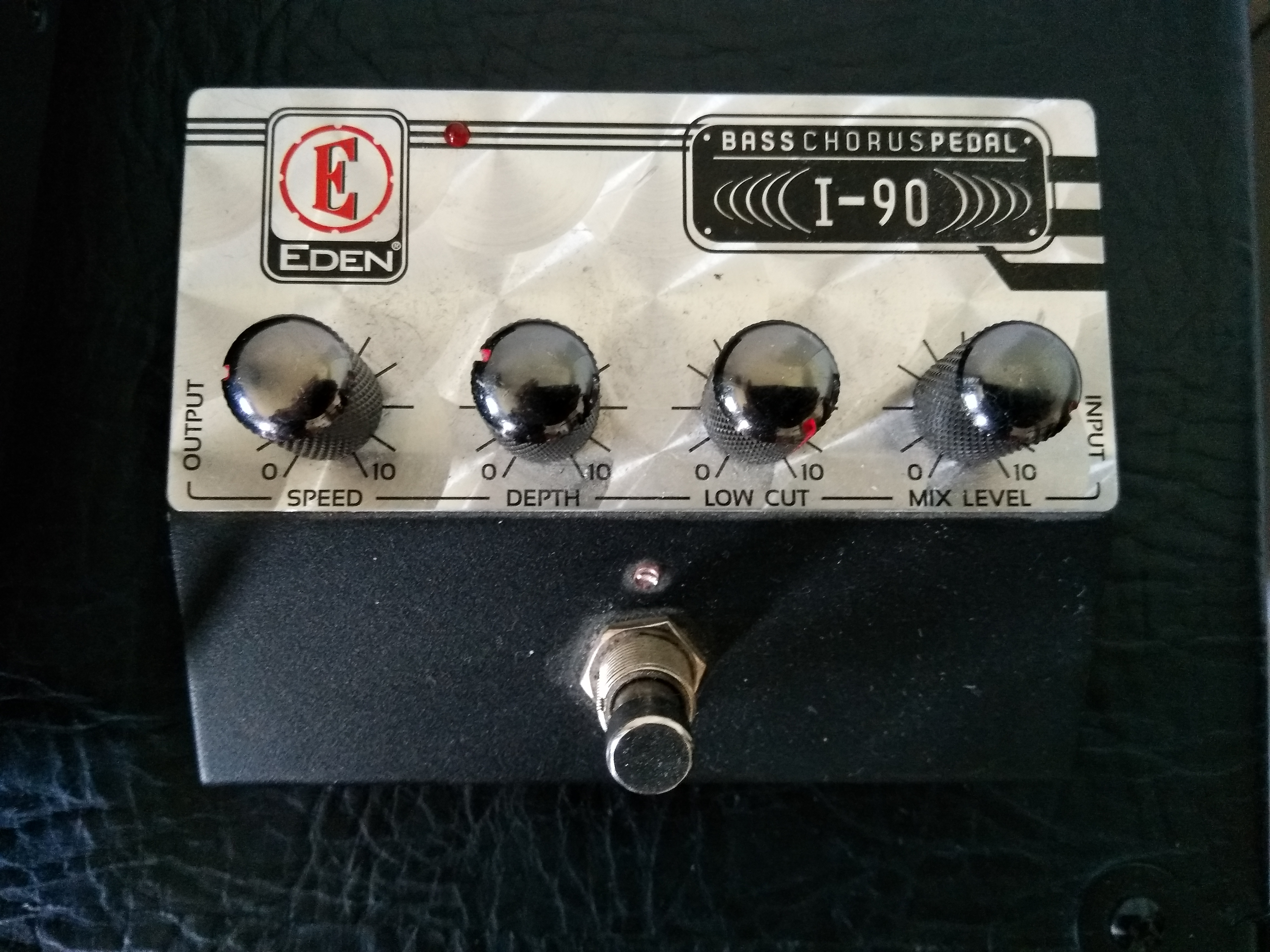
Eden bass chorus pedal I-90, with a dedicated low cut control.

The requirements for a chorus effect using a pedal or effect unit can vary depending on the type of instrument being used. Bass is a good example because it operates at a lower frequency range than a guitar. As such, a standard multi-level chorus can make the sound of the bass notes much thinner. This problem can be corrected by either mixing more of the un-affected ("dry") signal into the mix or by increasing the amount of bass frequency chorused in the sound. Pedals such as the "I90" chorus from bass amplifier manufacturer Eden Electronics allow the musician to control both of these elements. As some guitar chorus pedals pass the whole, unmodified signal and only apply chorus to higher frequencies, some bass players prefer the sound of some guitar-oriented pedals.

== Examples ==
The Boss CEB-3: Bass Chorus, for example, "offers a split-frequency chorus effect capable of applying warm, rich chorusing to the higher frequencies without muddying up the lows."

Digitech's Bass Multi Chorus™ is "designed specifically for bass". The manufacturer claims that "it keeps your low notes clean while giving you up to 16 bass chorus voices at the same time."

The MXR Bass Chorus Deluxe has a crossover which lessens "modulation in low frequencies is...at 100Hz", thus "keeping the low end in tune." The MXR outputs in stereo, creating a stereo chorus effect if used with two amplifiers. It won an Editor's award from Bass Player magazine. The review stated that the pedal uses "analog bucket-brigade technology—in which the signal runs through a series of capacitors to create an organic, warm-sounding effect."

The Carl Martin Bass Chorus is designed to avoid the "mid-range heavy" sound that the manufacturer claims is produced by some bass chorus pedals. The Carl Martin Bass Chorus can apply the effect even "down as [deep as a] low B."
