= List of Fullmetal Alchemist episodes =

Key visual for the series, featuring the alchemist brothers Edward (bottom right) and Alphonse Elric (top left)

Fullmetal Alchemist is an anime television series loosely based on the manga series Fullmetal Alchemist by Hiromu Arakawa. Set in a fictional universe in which alchemy is one of the most advanced scientific techniques, the story follows two alchemist brothers named Edward and Alphonse Elric, who want to recover parts of their bodies lost in an attempt to bring their deceased mother back to life through alchemy.

Produced by Bones and directed by Seiji Mizushima, the series aired in Japan on MBS and TBS from October 4, 2003, to October 2, 2004. It later aired on Cartoon Network's Adult Swim programming block in the United States from November 7, 2004, to March 19, 2006. An anime film titled Fullmetal Alchemist the Movie: Conqueror of Shamballa, a sequel to the television series, premiered in Japanese theaters on July 23, 2005; and it premiered in the U.S. on August 24, 2006. A series of five original video animations (OVAs) were also released. The majority of these OVAs are side stories and do not expand on the plot. In 2009, an anime television series reboot, titled Fullmetal Alchemist: Brotherhood for the English release, started broadcast on MBS and TBS, being directed by Yasuhiro Irie. Brotherhood is an independent second adaptation that directly follows the events of the manga and ignores the original anime's continuity.

The first series has been released in a series of thirteen DVDs from December 17, 2003, to January 26, 2005, in Japan. Funimation also released the same series of DVDs from February 8, 2005, to September 12, 2006, in the United States. MVM had released the first eight volumes in the United Kingdom; however, Funimation gave the rights over to Revelation Films. In March 2006 a DVD featuring the OVAs was released in Japan with the name of Fullmetal Alchemist: Premium Collection. Funimation acquired and dubbed the Premium Collection, which was released on August 4, 2009. During January from 2009, Bones released a "DVD box archives" of the anime. It includes the first anime of 51 episodes, the film, the CD soundtracks, and guidebooks from the series.

Eight pieces of theme music are used for the episodes. Each of the theme songs was performed by artists under Sony Music Entertainment Japan's label, whose anime distribution unit, Aniplex, handled the production and music production for the series. The music score was composed and arranged by Michiru Oshima. For episodes 2–13, the opening theme is "Melissa" by Porno Graffitti and the ending theme is "Kesenai Tsumi" (消せない罪; "Indelible Sin") by Nana Kitade. Episode 1 also uses "Melissa", but it uses it as an ending theme, and it doesn't have an opening theme. For episodes 14–25, the opening theme is "Ready Steady Go" by L'Arc-en-Ciel and the ending theme is "Tobira no Mukō e" (扉の向うへ; "Beyond the Door") by Yellow Generation. For episodes 26–41, the opening theme is "Undo" by Cool Joke and the ending theme is "Motherland" by Crystal Kay. For episodes 42-51, the opening theme is "Rewrite" by Asian Kung-Fu Generation and the ending theme is "I Will" by Sowelu (except the finale episode, which has a voiceover with the credits instead of an ending theme song). All episodes that originally opened with "Melissa" and "Undo" had "Ready Steady Go" shown in place of those songs on Cartoon Network's Adult Swim and YTV's Bionix. The DVD releases from Funimation include all openings in their original places and format.

== Episodes ==
No.	Title	Storyboarded by	Directed by	Written by	Original release date	English air date
1	"Those Who Challenge the Sun"; Transliteration: "Taiyō ni Idomu Mono" (Japanese: 太陽に挑む者)	Seiji Mizushima	Kazuki Tsunoda	Shō Aikawa	October 4, 2003	November 7, 2004
In a flashback, the Elric brothers Edward and Alphonse attempt to perform an alchemical transmutation in the hopes of resurrecting their late mother, but fail. As a consequence, Al disappears, Ed loses his left leg and his right arm, and a grotesque figure appears in the transmutation circle. In the present, the brothers arrive at the desert town of Lior, where they hear about a religious leader named Father Cornello who can perform miracles. Realizing that he is performing alchemy and ignoring the law of equivalent exchange, they believe that he possesses the philosopher's stone, which they have been searching for to restore Al's body. Threatened, Cornello orders Cray to kill them. Rosé, a girl the brothers meet, is traumatized after witnessing Al's lack of a human body. She runs to Cornello, the Elrics close behind, and Cornello releases a chimera on them. Cornello also transmuted a giant bird from a parrot and sends it to fight against Ed, who fends off both creatures by exposing his metal arm and leg, made from "automail". Cornello then realizes why Ed is nicknamed the "Fullmetal Alchemist", and that the brothers committed the ultimate sin of human transmutation.
2	"Body of the Sanctioned"; Transliteration: "Kinki no Karada" (Japanese: 禁忌の身体)	Kenji Yasuda	Kenji Yasuda	Shō Aikawa	October 11, 2003	November 14, 2004
Cornello attacks the boys to drive them away, and orders the townspeople to capture them. Ed transmutes some metal to look like Al, and allows himself to be captured. Cornello then takes the state alchemist pocket-watch from Ed, assuming that it is his secret to performing alchemy without a transmutation circle. Cornello catches Rosé trying to visit her deceased boyfriend Cain and he reveals the silhouette to be a chimera made of birds. He leaves her to be eaten by the chimera, but Al arrives just in time to save her. As Cornello tells Edward his plan to use Lior as the base for world domination, Al broadcasts it across town. Ed defeats Cornello with his superior alchemy, only to find out that the philosopher's stone is a fake. When Rosé confronts the Elrics about how their exposing Cornello did more harm than his deception, Ed tells her to walk on her own two feet. As the Elrics leave, Lust and Gluttony manage to salvage their plans with Lior by killing Cornello and replacing him with the shapeshifter Envy masquerading as the "real" Cornello.
3	"Mother"; Transliteration: "Okāsan..." (Japanese: おかあさん...)	Shingo Kaneko	Shingo Kaneko	Shō Aikawa	October 18, 2003	November 21, 2004
In a flashback that continues through to episode nine, the Elrics learn alchemy from a very young age, taking after their father, who abandoned his family when Al was still too young to remember him. They show their alchemy to both their friend Winry Rockbell and their mother Trisha. Trisha encourages them in their pursuits, but she dies suddenly and the brothers vow to revive her. The transmutation goes awry: Edward loses his left leg and Al loses his entire body. Ed then sacrifices his right arm to bind his brother's soul to a suit of armor. Alphonse carries Edward to Rockbell Automail, where Winry and her grandmother Pinako forge his Automail limbs. Roy Mustang arrives unexpectedly, having received a letter from the boys inquiring about their father Hohenheim of Light. Having seen the attempted human transmutation, Mustang tries to recruit the boys to become state alchemists, but Pinako angrily orders him to leave. Ed decides to become a state alchemist so that he can gain access to the state library, and find a way to restore Al's body. The Elrics burn down their childhood home and leave Resembool.
4	"A Forger's Love"; Transliteration: "Ai no Rensei" (Japanese: 愛の錬成)	Kenji Yasuda	Kentarō Nakamura	Toshiki Inoue	October 25, 2003	November 28, 2004
On their way to Central, the Elrics stop at a train station where they hear of an alchemist named Majhal, whose name had appeared several times in their father's correspondences relating to human transmutation, and decide to pay him a visit. Upon entering Majhal's village, they encounter a girl named Clause, who tells them that a zombie has murdered her older sister and several other villagers. When the brothers meet Majhal, he tells them that the mysterious zombie is believed to be his former lover Karin, who died in an accident several years ago. After further investigation, the brothers discover that Majhal has been attempting to revive Karin by using mannequins that look like her, and using alchemy to attach the souls of the village girls he has kidnapped to the mannequins. Ed discovers that Karin had not died, but temporarily lost her memories. Once her memories returned, she had sought out Majhal, but he was already too possessed by his passions of reviving Karin to recognize her. Majhal refuses to accept the wrinkled old woman as his Karin, and he attempts to kill Ed. Ed knocks Majhal's weapon out of his hand, which flies into the air and impales Majhal, killing him.
5	"The Man with the Mechanical Arm" ("Dash! Automail"); Transliteration: "Shissō! Ōtomeiru" (Japanese: 疾走! 機械鎧(オートメイル))	Shinsaku Sasaki	Shigeru Ueda	Aya Yoshinaga	November 1, 2003	December 5, 2004
The Elrics are told by Mustang to board the train that is currently leaving the station. Their train is hijacked by a group of terrorists led by a man named Bald. They take General Hakuro and his family captive and demand that their leader is released from prison. However, the Elrics fight back, and meet Major Maes Hughes, who helps them defeat Bald and rescue Hakuro. The train arrives safely at the station and the military moves in to arrest the terrorists. Bald manages to escape, but Mustang demonstrates his abilities as the "Flame Alchemist" and restrains Bald. Mustang then informs Ed that the grateful Hakuro has given him special permission to take the state alchemist examination, which surprises and annoys Ed because of the implication that Mustang manipulated him.
6	"The Alchemy Exam"; Transliteration: "Kokka Renkinjutsushi Shikaku Shiken" (Japanese: 国家錬金術師資格試験)	Kazuki Tsunoda	Jōhei Matsuura	Natsuko Takahashi	November 8, 2003	December 12, 2004
The Elrics begin preparing for the state alchemy examination while lodging with Shou Tucker, known as the "Sewing-Life Alchemist", who is credited for creating intelligent chimeras. The brothers become fast friends with his young daughter Nina and her dog Alexander. Hughes and his wife Gracia throw a birthday party for Ed, interrupting a chance to cram. During the party, Gracia goes into labor and they witness the birth of Elicia. Ed discovers at this time that he can perform alchemy without a transmutation circle. After the written portion of the test, Mustang forces Al to drop out due to his absence of a body, and the suspicions that this fact would raise were it to be discovered by his higher-ups. Ed successfully passes the interview and passes the practical portion when he saves the entire prospective state alchemist group with his quick thinking, courage, and ability to transmute without the use of a circle.
7	"Night of the Chimera's Cry"; Transliteration: "Kimera ga Naku Yoru" (Japanese: 合成獣が哭く夜)	Kenji Yasuda, Seiji Mizushima	Kenji Yasuda	Shō Aikawa	November 15, 2003	December 19, 2004
Ed is now a state alchemist. Mustang gives Ed a silver pocket watch, a symbol of his rank and an alchemical amplifier. Suspicious of Tucker's silence concerning the talking chimera that he created two years ago, Ed investigates at the state library but is denied access. On the way out, Ed encounters a mysterious man with a cross-shaped scar across his face, and a strange tattoo on his right arm. Brigadier General Basque Grand learns of Ed's investigations and orders him to stop, having the Elrics move out of Tucker's mansion. The Elrics sneak into Tucker's basement laboratory, where he has just finished creating another speaking chimera. Ed then pieces together that Tucker used his wife for his first chimera, and has now used Nina and Alexander for the new one. Tucker tells Ed that he is just as guilty for his human transmutation efforts, and Ed nearly beats Tucker to death in response. As Tucker is arrested, Ed manages to free the chimera, which encounters the scarred man. He declares it to be a sin against nature and destroys it. The scarred man disappears as the Elrics discover Nina-Alexander's remains splattered on the alley wall.
8	"The Philosopher's Stone"; Transliteration: "Kenja no Ishi" (Japanese: 賢者の石)	Masaki Tachibana	Yoshito Hata	Shō Aikawa	November 22, 2003	January 2, 2005
Anguished by the horrible demise of Nina, and disgusted at his first assignment of organizing Tucker's research after learning of the man's death, Ed considers deserting to track down Nina's killer. Luckily, Al finds reference to the philosopher's stone among Tucker's papers. Ed is incredulous that such a thing even exists. Left to his own devices, Al has spoken to Führer King Bradley. Winry, who has arrived at Central to visit, is kidnapped by a butcher-turned-serial killer named Barry the Chopper, who disguises himself as a woman. Ed gets kidnapped as well and his automail arm is taken from him as he tries to free Winry and run away. Forced into a fight for his life, Ed almost kills Barry in an act of maddened desperation until Al arrived to stop him, having the authorities arrest Barry. Ed breaks down in tears, and then agrees to search for the philosopher's stone with Al after talking it out with him. Mustang later allows them to search for it, with the caveat that he be kept abreast of developments. Ed is officially dubbed the "Fullmetal Alchemist" by Bradley.
9	"Be Thou for the People" ("The Dog of the Military's Silver Watch"); Transliteration: "Gun no Inu no Gindokei" (Japanese: 軍の狗の銀時計)	Akitoshi Yokoyama, Seiji Mizushima	Atsushi Ōtsuki	Katsuhiko Takayama	November 29, 2003	January 9, 2005
While the Elrics take Winry shopping, Ed receives his second assignment to inspect the coal mines at the town of Youswell. However, the townsfolk is distrusting of the state military. Lieutenant Yoki, the military commander in charge of the area, comes to collect taxes from the local inn, though a riot erupts. Ed appears in time before Yoki nearly murders Kyle, the son of the innkeeper. Yoki invites Ed to his mansion, after noticing that the Ed is a state alchemist, through flattery and bribery. Come nightfall, the inn is destroyed by Lyra, an alchemist and maid working for Yoki. Al saves Kyle from the rubble. Ed reluctantly transmutes the gold coins that Yoki attempted to bribe him with, overlaying the gold over coal bars. He then uses them to purchase the mine from Yoki under the guise of a priceless transfer before returning the bars to stone and selling the entire town to the people of Youswell for a single night stay at the newly repaired inn. Ed defeats Yoki's alchemist servant Lyra, becoming known as a hero.
10	"The Phantom Thief" ("Phantom Thief Psiren"); Transliteration: "Kaitō Sairēn" (Japanese: 怪盗サイレーン)	Tomoki Kyoda	Masakazu Hashimoto	Toshiki Inoue	December 6, 2003	January 16, 2005
After exposing Cornello in Lior as a fraud, the Elrics are on their way back to report to Mustang about the incident. They stop at the town of Aquroya where Ed gets treated for a stomach bug. That's where he and Al meets a kind and patient nurse who reminds Al of their mother. After being discharged from the hospital, Ed gets caught up in the manhunt for a talented cat burglar named Psiren, who uses her skills as an alchemist to repeatedly fool the local police. It turns out the cat burglar is the nurse and she convinces them she's stealing to raise money to prevent the hospital from being torn down. It soon becomes apparent she's not giving the money to the hospital after it gets demolished (and she repeats the same excuse with two other buildings). Al gives her the benefit of the doubt because he saw how kind she was and they find out she does help the city in an indirect way; she draws in tourists. Ed finally manages to catch her and Al isn't necessarily happy about it. In the end, the crafty Psiren escapes police custody.
11	"The Other Brothers Elric: Part 1" ("The Land of Sand: Part 1"); Transliteration: "Sareki no Daichi: Zenpen" (Japanese: 砂礫の大地・前編)	Tomoki Kyoda	Kazuki Tsunoda	Natsuko Takahashi	December 13, 2003	January 23, 2005
The Elrics arrive in Xenotime, a town plagued by sickness, to look for the philosopher's stone. They hear that a philosopher's stone is near completion, researched by a man named Mugear. When they announce themselves as the Elric brothers, the town turns on them, saying the Elric brothers have already arrived. They sneak into Mugear's mansion and find the imposters but are fended off by the older brother (an alchemist named Russell Tringham). Al later runs into his imposter counterpart, Russell's younger brother Fletcher; Fletcher apologizes for taking the Elrics' names and Al urges him to tell Russell to stop. Meanwhile, Mugear meets underground with Lust, who is behind the plan to make the philosopher's stone. The following night, Ed and Al sneak into the mansion again but are exposed to toxic "red water". Fletcher helps them escape but Russell wants to continue his father's unfinished work, even though the byproducts are making the town sick. Al reveals that the red stone they have made is a poor copy of the Philosopher Stone and Russell attacks Ed using crimson water. However, Fletcher dives in the way and is soaked in the toxic water.
12	"The Other Brothers Elric: Part 2" ("The Land of Sand: Part 2"); Transliteration: "Sareki no Daichi: Kōhen" (Japanese: 砂礫の大地・後編)	Shinsaku Sasaki	Masakazu Amiya	Manabu Ishikawa	December 20, 2003	January 30, 2005
Ed and Al reluctantly flee the mansion. Fletcher and Russell are imprisoned by Mugear when they refuse to use an alternate method to create the crimson stone more quickly. The Elrics learn that Nash Tringham, the father of Russell and Fletcher, was the original discoverer/researcher of the red stone. After the mining town ran out of gold, Mugear convinced Nash that a philosopher's stone would turn lead into gold and make the town prosperous again, but the side affects were toxic red water and sick babies. A traveling alchemist doctor, Tim Marcoh, healed one of these babies with a mysterious stone. Mugear invites the Elrics to help him and Ed tricks him into taking him to the imprisoned Tringham brothers. Ed convinces Russell that his father abandoned the research when he saw the damage, and that the Tringhams must find their own path. Ed frees them and faces off against Mugear; the researcher is defeated but the underground mine shaft collapses, causing the crimson water to flood out of the spring. Fletcher uses alchemy to make the trees absorb the water, neutralizing the threat. Edward and Alphonse say farewell to the Tringhams, boarding a train for East City.
13	"Fullmetal vs. Flame"; Transliteration: "Honō tai Hagane" (Japanese: 焔VS鋼)	Masahiro Andō	Masahiro Andō	Shō Aikawa	December 27, 2003	February 6, 2005
The Elrics report to Mustang regarding about the investigation into the philosopher's stone. Master Sergeant Kain Fuery picks up a dog and tries to get someone to adopt it but fails. Mustang and Hughes then discusses with Ed about Marcoh. Grand later interrupts and declares that Marcoh was a deserter. When Ed is offered re-certification, he challenges Mustang to a duel in exchange for the information. The approved duel is set to fight in the parade grounds. Mustang nearly defeats Edward, but allows him to counter from his hesitation. Mustang informs Ed about Marcoh after halting the match. That night, Hughes reveals that a man named Scar is responsible for Bradley's move.
14	"Destruction's Right Hand"; Transliteration: "Hakai no Migite" (Japanese: 破壊の右手)	Tarō Iwasaki	Tarō Iwasaki	Shō Aikawa	January 10, 2004	February 12, 2005
Civil unrest has broken out in the town of Lior with Envy using his shape-shifting powers to disguise himself as Cornello. The Elrics find Marcoh and learn about the usage of the philosopher's stone in the Ishbal rebellion before he went missing. Grand enters with soldiers, confiscates Marcoh's information on the philosopher's stone, and arrests Marcoh, leaving the Elrics behind. However, Scar appears and kills Grand before turning his attention to Marcoh. The Elrics and Marcoh quickly evade into a tunnel, long enough to be saved by Major Alex Louis Armstrong, the "Strong Arm Alchemist".
15	"The Ishbal Massacre"; Transliteration: "Ishuvāru Gyakusatsu" (Japanese: イシュヴァール虐殺)	Kenji Yasuda	Kenji Yasuda	Shō Aikawa	January 17, 2004	February 19, 2005
Armstrong reveals that Scar is an Ishbalan alchemist during their battle. Marcoh tells the Elrics about the Ishbal massacre, how state alchemists were used against the Ishbalans, who viewed alchemy as heretical. Marcoh, forced to use his research, caused huge casualties on the Ishbalan side. Mustang, forced to kill a pair of doctors who were saving lives from both sides, allows Marcoh to desert. When the doctors are revealed to be Winry's parents, Marcoh refuses to escape to Resembool with the Elrics. Scar, fleeing from the military, runs into the Elrics again as they defend themselves against him, resulting in Scar destroying Ed's arm and damaging Al's body. Just as Scar prepares to finish off Ed, Marcoh throws his red stone at Scar, causing him to painfully absorb the stone into his tattooed arm. Outnumbered by military reinforcements, Scar manages to escape into the sewers and Marcoh is taken to a "safe location" by the Führer's personal secretary.
16	"That Which Is Lost"; Transliteration: "Ushinawareta Mono" (Japanese: 失われたもの)	Tomoki Kyoda	Masakazu Hashimoto	Shō Aikawa	January 24, 2004	February 26, 2005
Armstrong escorts the Elric brothers back to Resembool to have themselves repaired. Lust attacks Marcoh in his "safe house" and coerces him into revealing the location of his research on the philosopher's stone. On the train to Resembool, Ed and Armstrong discover that Al was unloaded at the previous station and are forced to search for him. When Armstrong urges patience, Ed explodes in rage and abandons Armstrong. However, Ed is soon jumped by a girl who steals his automail leg. The girl's grandfather, while giving back Ed's leg, explains that he lost his leg during the Ishbal rebellion and that he wishes to retain his wound as a reminder of it. Meanwhile, Al is stolen by a boy who wishes to prove himself by raiding an enemy's mansion. Al frightens the boy by claiming he is a haunted armor. The Elrics reunite as Armstrong reappears, grabbing them and dashes toward the departing train, hoping to catch it.
17	"House of the Waiting Family"; Transliteration: "Kazoku no Matsu Ie" (Japanese: 家族の待つ家)	Kazuki Tsunoda	Kazuki Tsunoda	Natsuko Takahashi	January 31, 2004	March 5, 2005
The Elrics and Armstrong all return to Resembool, meeting up with Pinako, who agrees to repair Ed in three days time. While the Elrics recuperate, Armstrong assists Winry and Pinako in work. The Elrics later reminisce about their childhood while at their mother's tombstone. Al seems to worry about having fading memories, but Armstrong breaks the tension. A few days later, receiving his replacement arm and leg, Ed uses his alchemy to rebuild Al's armored body from the shattered remains. Afterwards, the brothers and Armstrong head back to Central to find Marcoh's research.
18	"Marcoh's Notes"; Transliteration: "Marukō Nōto" (Japanese: マルコー・ノート)	Shinsaku Sasaki	Atsushi Ōtsuki	Manabu Ishikawa	February 7, 2004	March 12, 2005
In the state library, Lust searches for Marcoh's research before encountering Scar; she reminds him of a previous acquaintance. He realizes that Lust and Gluttony are homunculi as the library is set ablaze from their attack. The Elrics meet Sergeant Denny Brosh and 2nd Lt. Maria Ross, their new bodyguards, not long before they find the first branch of the state library burned to the ground. The Elrics go on an exhaustive search to find other sources for the book, leading them to Sheska, a file clerk who formerly worked at the library before being fired for reading all the time. Sheska reveals that she has memorized all of Marcoh's works, and then makes handwritten duplicates for the Elric brothers. The writing is written in a code created by Marcoh, though resembling that of a cookbook. The brothers attempt to decipher the hidden data for several days, only to discover that producing the philosopher's stone requires human lives.
19	"The Truth Behind Truths"; Transliteration: "Shinjitsu no Oku no Oku" (Japanese: 真実の奥の奥)	Tamaki Nakatsu	Tamaki Nakatsu	Katsuhiko Takayama	February 14, 2004	March 19, 2005
Horrified by the key ingredient in making the philosopher's stone, the Elrics nearly give up their quest. However, Ross inspires them to continue. A hidden piece of information reveals an unused laboratory next to a prison where raw materials for the stone were gathered. Ignoring the orders of Brosh and Ross, they sneak out to investigate the laboratory themselves. Scar attacks the dormitories and gathers that the brothers have traveled to the fifth laboratory before pursuing them. Ed enters the building via an air duct, triggering several traps before finally meeting the security guard named Number 48. Outside, Al is ambushed by another security guard named Number 66.
20	"Soul of the Guardian"; Transliteration: "Shugosha no Tamashii" (Japanese: 守護者の魂)	Tarō Iwasaki	Tarō Iwasaki	Katsuhiko Takayama	February 21, 2004	March 26, 2005
The Elrics learn that the guards are souls bound to empty suits of armor. Ed struggles in his battle against Number 48, a serial killer known as Slicer, when his automail arm malfunctions. Ed momentarily gains the upper hand, but is shocked to learn that his opponent is a pair of brothers, with the elder bound to the helmet and the younger controlling the body. Ed manages to defeat the Slicer brothers by use of Scar's destruction technique, yet he refuses to finish them off, due to seeing Al in the same manner. Al realizes that Number 66 is Barry the Chopper, who tries to suggest that Al never truly existed, saying he was a doll made for Ed. Contemplating on the possibility, Al recalls that Ed was afraid of telling him something.
21	"The Red Glow"; Transliteration: "Akai Kagayaki" (Japanese: 紅い輝き)	Masahiro Andō	Masahiro Andō	Shō Aikawa	February 28, 2004	April 2, 2005
Scar luckily arrives and helps a disadvantaged Al defeat Barry. This causes Barry to set off explosives, freeing an imprisoned Greed as well as others around him. The older Slicer agrees to take Ed to the interior of the laboratory, but the younger Slicer breaks his blood seal after Ed calls him human. Solf J. Kimblee, the "Crimson Alchemist", and several other prisoners are led by a fake Grand to be ingredients for the philosopher's stone. Ed and Slicer are attacked by mutant chimeras until they are called off by Tucker, who, after his death was fabricated, has become a chimera himself. As Al and Scar travel into the laboratory, Scar reminisces about his brother and Ishbal, but they are attacked by Lust and Gluttony, who Scar reveals to be homunculi. Tucker shows Ed around the laboratory, who realizes that he has been given the opportunity to create the philosopher's stone.
22	"Created Human"; Transliteration: "Tsukurareta Ningen" (Japanese: 造られた人間)	Sōichi Masui	Masakazu Hashimoto	Shō Aikawa	March 6, 2004	April 9, 2005
Hughes organizes an expedition to rescue the Elrics in the fifth laboratory. Envy, in the guise of Grand, gathers the human ingredients and forces Ed to attempt to transmute a philosopher's stone. Bradley joins the expedition and mobilizes the military in the rescue mission. Kimblee sets off an explosion, causing the prisoners to fall into the room below. Ed questions the prisoners for their reason being in the laboratory, though this results in a short fight against Envy before Lust intervenes. Lust takes Al hostage, giving Ed the ultimatum of transmuting the philosopher's stone or watching Al's blood seal be broken. Ed fails in his struggle to transmute the stone. Suddenly, Ed's body begins to react after being doused in the incomplete stone, destroying his surroundings. The homunculi escape as the military invades the base and Ross calms Ed down.
23	"Fullmetal Heart"; Transliteration: "Hagane no Kokoro" (Japanese: 鋼のこころ)	Kenji Yasuda	Kenji Yasuda	Natsuko Takahashi	March 13, 2004	April 16, 2005
Ed, recovering from his wounds from the laboratory, is scolded by Ross for almost dying. Needing his automail repaired, Ed calls for Winry to come to Central. When Winry arrives at the train station, Al still contemplates what Barry had told him. After the brothers refuse to tell her about the events, Winry leaves in a fury and is dragged off by Hughes to his daughter's birthday party. Hughes tells her that men tend to hide things so as not to worry anyone. Al decides to confront Ed about what he was afraid to tell him, asking if he was really an artificial soul.
24	"Bonding Memories"; Transliteration: "Omoide no Teichaku" (Japanese: 思い出の定着)	Shinsaku Sasaki	Yoshinori Odaka	Toshiki Inoue	March 20, 2004	April 23, 2005
Al has run away after not receiving an answer from Ed. He soon runs into Scar, who has been hiding among other refugees from Ishbal as they are terrorized by mercenaries posing as the state military soldiers with Barry accompanying them. After being reunited with his brother, Ed and Al reaffirm their existence. Meanwhile, the leader of the mercenaries is killed by Furher Bradley's secretary when he confronts her about his band being attacked by the Brothers and Scar, revealing her to be a homunculus.
25	"Words of Farewell"; Transliteration: "Wakare no Gishiki" (Japanese: 別れの儀式)	Sōichi Masui	Kazuki Tsunoda, Seiji Mizushima	Shō Aikawa	March 27, 2004	April 30, 2005
Deciding to follow Scar to get clues about the philosopher's stone, the brothers take Winry with them when she notices that Rush Valley, a town best known for its automail shops, is en route. As they leave, Hughes investigates the fifth laboratory, discovering a connection between it and the war in Ishbal. He confronts the key suspect in it, Juliet Douglas, but is then attacked by Lust. He escapes the two women and tries to telephone Mustang with his information via telephone booth, only to be attacked by Envy, disguised as Ross before he assumes Gracia's form to deliver the death blow. Hughes is posthumously promoted to the rank of a brigadier general. In a flashback, Mustang and Hughes conspire together to ensure the tragedy in Ishbal never happens again.
26	"Her Reason"; Transliteration: "Kanojo no Riyū" (Japanese: 彼女の理由)	Tarō Iwasaki	Tarō Iwasaki	Natsuko Takahashi	April 3, 2004	May 7, 2005
Mustang investigates Hughes' murder and concludes through Armstrong that a high ranked member of the military may be responsible for his death. Izumi Curtis, Edward and Alphonse's teacher, shows up at Central looking for them, but she has missed them by a few days. Edward, Alphonse, and Winry, on their way to Ishbal, arrive in Rush Valley.
27	"Teacher"; Transliteration: "Sensei" (Japanese: センセイ)	Masahiro Andō	Masahiro Andō	Katsuhiko Takayama	April 10, 2004	September 18, 2005
Izumi has finally caught up with her wayward protégés, Edward and Alphonse. They have every reason to fear her as she drags them back to Dublith.
28	"All is One, One is All"; Transliteration: "Ichi wa Zen, Zen wa Ichi" (Japanese: 一は全、全は一)	Shigeru Ueda	Shigeru Ueda	Akatsuki Yamatoya	April 17, 2004	September 25, 2005
Izumi strands Edward and Alphonse on Yock Island, where they originally learned an important life lesson before she took them on as apprentices years before. She wants them to have time to reflect on their mistakes.
29	"The Untainted Child"; Transliteration: "Kegarenaki Kodomo" (Japanese: 汚れなき子ども)	Tamaki Nakatsu	Tamaki Nakatsu	Shō Aikawa	April 24, 2004	October 1, 2005
The young boy who shadowed Edward and Alphonse on Yock Island is not only an alchemist; he is able to transmute his own body. After finding out about the scars on the boy's right arm and left leg, Ed discovers that the boy is a homunculus who took his limbs during their failed attempt at human alchemy.
30	"Assault on South Headquarters"; Transliteration: "Nanpō Shireibu Shūgeki" (Japanese: 南方司令部襲撃)	Sōichi Masui	Masakazu Hashimoto	Shō Aikawa	May 1, 2004	October 8, 2005
Yoki spots Scar in a group of Ishbalans arriving at a refugee camp. He runs off to contact the military, hoping to be reinstated. Meanwhile, the military, believing the mysterious boy to be a homunculus, captures and imprisons him in South Headquarters. A chimera called Bido discovers the same and Izumi storms South Headquarters to rescue him, but she soon finds herself in a five-way fight over the boy.
31	"Sin"; Transliteration: "Tsumi" (Japanese: 罪)	Kenji Yasuda	Kenji Yasuda	Shō Aikawa	May 8, 2004	October 15, 2005
Envy, disguised as Führer Bradley, yanks off the homunculus boy from Izumi and run to a secret room. There, Envy tells the boy that he can perform alchemy now that Ed's lost limbs are in his possession and gives the boy some red stones to eat which allows him to recall his memories of the Gate. Izumi fights Armstrong and the Elrics fight Bido and Kimblee, with Archer overhearing the latter four's conversation. Once the dust is settled, the homunculus boy, later revealed to be Wrath, reunites with Izumi, who takes him to Yock Island. Archer offers Kimblee the chance to be exonerated for his past crimes and reinstated back into the military. The Elrics and Winry arrive at Yock Island to save Izumi from being choked to death by Wrath. A sorrowful Izumi explains to them the truth: she created Wrath after failing to revive her stillborn child and she only brought him here to kill him to make up for her sin, but couldn't. Ed still believes homunculi are created by alchemy like those chimeras in Lab 5, but he is corrected by Wrath that homunculi are created from failed human transmutations and all they want to do is become human themselves. Meanwhile, Greed and his chimera gang including Kimblee arrive at Yock Island to get Wrath to be on their side, only for Greed to be faced off by Envy and Sloth until Greed decides to leave with his gang, not wanting to fight two homunculi at once. Wrath explains his background to the Elrics, Winry, and Izumi, and declares to take the rest of Ed's body for himself. The Elrics are forced to fight Wrath despite Winry's objection.
32	"Dante of the Deep Forest"; Transliteration: "Fukai Mori no Dante" (Japanese: 深い森のダンテ)	Masaki Tachibana	Tarō Iwasaki	Shō Aikawa, Akatsuki Yamatoya	May 15, 2004	October 22, 2005
Izumi interrupts the Elrics' battle with Wrath by separating the combatants with a deep chasm. Wrath escapes and the Elrics pursue him, only to encounter Envy cosplaying as Führer Bradley and Sloth cosplaying as Bradley's secretary Juliet Douglas. Having duped the Elrics into getting their attention off Wrath, who is hidden away in Sloth's watery body, Envy and Sloth decide to head to their master's place, as only she would know how to stop Greed. At the Sothern Slums, Mustang and his unit declare to take the Ishbalans to the military-run camps. Yoki, who is still looking for Scar to turn him in to the military, is killed by a disguised and hidden Lust. Alongside Gluttony, the two homunculi manipulate the Ishbalan refugees to resist the military until Mustang intervenes to bring the riot under control. Back in Dublith, Izumi expels the Elrics from her teachings for echoing her mistakes of preforming human transmutation. However, with Sig and Winry's encouragement, the Elrics convince Izumi to help them find another method on how they can restore their bodies without human sacrifice. She sends them to meet her alchemy teacher, an old woman named Dante, to learn an important lesson about the principle of Equivalent Exchange. While at Dante's house, the Elrics encounter Lyra, who has become Dante's apprentice and apologizes to the boys for her actions when they last met and are the reason for her change of heart. Greed and his chimera gang including Kimblee arrive at Dante's estate. Greed and Kimblee knock Ed unconscious, while the rest of Greed's gang prepare to take Al into their custody.
33	"Al, Captured"; Transliteration: "Torawareta Aru" (Japanese: 囚われたアル)	Tarō Iwasaki	Kazuki Tsunoda	Akatsuki Yamatoya	May 29, 2004	October 29, 2005
Marta hops inside Alphonse's armor and slows him down just enough for Law to overpower Al, and the kidnappers take him to their headquarters for a rendezvous with Greed. While Ed recovers and searches through town to discover any information on Al's whereabouts, Izumi and Sig go to see Dante. In an intense conversation, Dante reveals that the kidnappers left an emblem revealing the name of the pub Al has been taken to. Izumi and Dante discuss their differences in philosophy and perception of the world, with Izumi hoping the Elrics will someday find the truth that differs from theirs before she leaves with Sig. At his hideout, Greed reveals to Al that he desires the knowledge of how souls can be bound to inanimate objects, such as Al's suit of armor. Izumi and Sig burst onto the scene to rescue Alphonse from the powerful homunculus and his cohorts, and are later joined by Edward. They are unable to cause harm to him, however, as he utilizes his Ultimate Shield whenever attacked. Before Greed and Ed can truly battle, with Greed declaring that he will personally teach Ed how to kill without hesitation, the military, led by Archer, burst into the building to take over. In the ensuing chaos, Greed discovers that Kimblee has betrayed his team and has officially joined up with Archer. With the military in full force, Greed has no chance, as he and the other kidnappers take Al and leave. Before Ed is able to run after them, he is cornered at gunpoint by the military, who demand that he stand down and report to Archer.
34	"Theory of Avarice"; Transliteration: "Gōyoku no Riron" (Japanese: 強欲の理論)	Sōichi Masui	Jun Fukuda	Akatsuki Yamatoya	June 5, 2004	November 5, 2005
Archer has Edward, Izumi, and Sig in custody, reinstates both Kimblee and Tucker as state alchemists under his command, and orders his men to take no prisoners hunting down Greed and his associates. Ed, Izumi, and Sig later escape from custody. Greed tries to escape with his cohorts, only to be confronted by Armstrong, who battles with Law until Law collapses the wall, ensuring the group's escape. While Greed and his remaining allies recover in a small shack, Lust and Gluttony appear. Dolcetto and Law unwaveringly step up and sacrifice themselves allowing Greed, Al, and Marta to escape. In a forest, Greed instructs Al and Marta to wait for him while he takes care of business until sunrise, and if he isn’t back by then, the two are on their own. Marta realizes he is headed for Dante's house and tries to go after him, but Al restrains her. Greed is greeted by Lyra, who guides him to a parlor, where he discovers Dante's body split down the middle, seemingly by a sword, and a complex alchemy circle on the ceiling and floor. Before Greed has time to react, Lyra uses alchemy to forcibly eject the Philosopher's Stone fragments that Greed has consumed in his life. She exits, leaving him in pain, as Ed enters. Shocked at Dante's corpse, he blames her death on Greed. While they fight, Ed discovers the secret to his human shield through logic, and uses alchemy to undo it. He manages to stab Greed in through the chest. As he lays dying, Greed explains to Edward that he let Al go and that the only way to kill a homunculus without its regeneration is to expose them to the human remains that it was created with, ensuring Ed to kill the rest of the homunucli. At sunrise, Marta leaves Al behind, knowing that Greed isn't returning. After the Elrics reunite, Izumi and Sig part ways with them and Winry, who will next find the Ishbalans.
35	"Reunion of the Fallen"; Transliteration: "Gusha no Saikai" (Japanese: 愚者の再会)	Masahiro Andō	Masahiro Andō	Toshiki Inoue	June 12, 2004	November 12, 2005
Lust, Envy, and Gluttony discuss Greed's recent death. Just then, a child is healed by Lujon, a man from Lust's past, following a car wreck. As he catches up with Lust, a flashback shows how she and Gluttony watch the results of a landslide and its victims. Meanwhile, the Elrics and Winry, while riding in a cart south to the Ishbalan camp, save a girl named Lydia from a band of thugs in the forest. She is looking for Lujon, who is supposed to be finding a second Philosopher's Stone to save the people of their village from the return of a plague. This illness looks similar to Epidermodysplasia verruciformis. As Lujon, Lust, and Gluttony ride back together to his village, Lujon reveals that the power in his Philosopher's Stone has waned considerably. The flashback continues, revealing how Lujon's failed attempts to cure the first onslaught of the plague provoked Lust into teaching him the refined arts of alchemy. As they study together, Lujon falls in love with her; however, Lust only stays with him because he invokes faint memories in her mind that she cannot identify. Once he has learned the secrets to curing the illness, he manages to save his fiancé Lydia from death's grip. On their wedding day, Lujon leaves her at the altar for Lust, who unsuccessfully commands him to go to her. Once he leaves, she laughs with Envy about the success of their plan. In present time, Lujon embraces Lust in the village before saving his people, exclaiming how he won't let her leave him this time. Sadly, Lust stabs him dead and the villagers all perish. Minutes later, the Elrics and Winry arrive to witness the tragedy. Lydia runs into the fog before they can stop her and is found lying dead next to Lujon's corpse, succumbed to the disease as Lust and Gluttony ride away in their carriage.
36	"The Sinner Within"; Transliteration: "Waga Uchinaru Togabito" (Japanese: 我が内なる科人)	Kenji Yasuda	Masakazu Hashimoto	Shō Aikawa	June 19, 2004	November 19, 2005
The Elrics tamper with the water supply for a train heading towards the miliary-run camps to help the Ishbalan refugees, including brothers Rick and Leo, escape. Winry arrives with a tractor she stole and escorts the Elrics, Rick, and Leo to Kishua to speak with the Ishbalan Exile to get more info about the Philosopher's Stone. Along the way, the Elrics personally request that Winry avoid traveling with them any further because of the increasing number of deaths being involved throughout their journey to get their bodies back. When the group arrives at Kishua, the Elrics discover the exile's tent showing the same alchemical symbol marking on Scar's tattooed arm and the basement of Lab 5. Lts. Hawkeye and Breda arrive and confront the Elrics for the trouble they've caused with the train. Furthermore, the Ishbalans have been accused of killing former Lt. Yoki at the Slums and that the Exile is in protective custody. Communicating with the Exile, the Elrics learn that he was banned from Ishbal because he study the Grand Arcanum, once followed in Ishbal until it was forbidden, and that human sacrifice is the only method to create a Philosopher's Stone no matter what alchemic style. The Exile adds that Scar was last here and that he too is now an exile. The Elrics later identify to Hawkeye that Lust was Yoki's killer, clearing the Ishbalans of any wrongdoing, though they'll still be sent to the camps. Meanwhile, Winry talks to Rick and Leo about her parents who were doctors during the Ishbal War until Mustang killed them on military orders. The Elrics continue en route with the tractor to Ishbal to find Scar, while Winry heads back to Central with Hawkeye's help to visit Hughes and his family, only to tearfully learn of his death from Gracia.
37	"The Flame Alchemist, The Bachelor Lieutenant & The Mystery of Warehouse 13"; Transliteration: "Honō no Renkinjutsushi, Tatakau Shōi-san, Dai-Jūsan Sōko no Kai" (Japanese: 焔の錬金術師 戦う少尉さん 第十三倉庫の怪)	Shingo Kaneko	Shingo Kaneko	Natsuko Takahashi	June 26, 2004	November 26, 2005
In this comedy interlude, 2nd Lt. Jean Havoc has been investigating Mustang under orders from internal affairs, and he enlists several comrades to help. However, Mustang's theft of Havoc's potential girlfriends is negatively affecting Havoc's productivity, so Mustang orders Warrant Officer Vato Falman to find Havoc a date. Armstrong recommends his sister, who rejects Havoc because she expected someone more muscular. In the other half of the episode, Mustang is roped by his subordinates into investigating the mystery of the "haunted" thirteenth warehouse that appears out of nowhere.
38	"With the River's Flow"; Transliteration: "Kawa no Nagare ni" (Japanese: 川の流れに)	Tarō Iwasaki	Tarō Iwasaki	Akatsuki Yamatoya	July 3, 2004	December 3, 2005
After wrecking the tractor that Winry stole for them, Ed and Al are forced to take a long walk and arrive at some random town. They separate after getting into an alchemy-enhanced argument about what they should do next: go after Scar or the homunculi. Al then bumps into an old acquaintance, Marta, who wants him to help her exact vengeance against Kimblee for betraying her group and the military. Al refuses, stating that her late comrades wouldn't want her to exact vengeance as well, before he leaves. Meanwhile, Winry meets with Sheska in Central, and the two decide to launch their own investigation into the murder of Hughes since Sheska doesn't trust anyone in the military, not even Mustang. They learn what Hughes had uncover about Juliet Douglas (Sloth), Führer Bradley's secretary, whom Sheska believes is an alien. Winry and Sheska then head to where the phone lines are connected and eavesdrop on a conversation that Sloth has with Envy, who is currently on a mission in the north. Winry and Sheska are almost immediately afterwards attacked by Sloth, but she retreats when Winry recognizes her as Ed and Al's mom, Trisha, and the timely intervention of Lt. Ross and Sgt. Brosh. Meanwhile, the Elrics reconcile and agree to go after Scar first. Before they can travel to Ishbal on foot, luckily for the Elrics, Marta has arrived with her motorcycle, though Al is still uneasy and tells her that he won't allow her to exact revenge. Once the trio are settled, they head straight for Ishbal, while the Elrics talk about their past fights back when they were younger.
39	"Secret of Ishbal" ("The East Civil War"); Transliteration: "Tōhō Naisen" (Japanese: 東方内戦)	Kazuki Tsunoda	Kazuki Tsunoda	Shō Aikawa	July 10, 2004	December 10, 2005
Ross and Brosh interrogate Winry and Sheska about their actions in Central, but the girls refuse to answer, though as Ross and Brosh leave, Winry warns Ross about something bad happening within the military and that she needs to be careful. Declaring it is too dangerous to remain in Central, Winry heads back to Resembool, taking Sheska with her. On the train to a military base near Lior, Mustang is dismayed that Kimblee is part of the force and reinstated as a state alchemist by Archer, who has been promoted to Colonel for this operation. The Elrics and Marta arrive in the deserted Ishbal. There, Marta explains to the Elrics the real truth about the Ishbal War: a special private ops unit that Marta was part of was dispatch to launch an attack on Ishbal before they were taken into custody without question and brought to Lab 5. They were each fused with chimeras and imprisoned to cover up the truth. This revelation anguishes Edward, who along with Alphonse are brought to Mustang by 2nd Lts. Breda and Havoc. Mustang puts the Elrics under his supervision following Ed's recent attack on the train with the Ishbalan refugees. At dinner, Mustang shows Ed an aerial view of Lior, which reveals that Scar, who has been dragging a giant rock around the city, gouging the earth, is creating a giant Grand Arcanum transmutation circle. Making matters worse, Lior had become a war-torn since the Elrics exposed Cornello. Ed is dispatch by Archer to go undercover into Lior to investigate the area on the condition that Al is left behind so Ed does not have the will to "go AWOL". Ed leaves after giving away his silver pocket watch, which Archer gives to Tucker to have red stones placed in it. Al and Marta encounter Kimblee and Marta prepares to attack Kimblee in belated retaliation for betraying her and her comrades. Arriving in Lior, a disguised Ed is shocked to see his old acquaintance, Rosé, now dubbed as the "Holy Mother", just as Scar recognizes him and grabs his shoulder.
40	"The Scar"; Transliteration: "Kizuato" (Japanese: 傷痕)	Kenji Yasuda	Kenji Yasuda	Shō Aikawa	July 17, 2004	December 17, 2005
After a failed attempt to injure Marta by sacrificing a soldier, Kimblee finds himself fighting Al, who is protecting Marta, until the fight is broken up by Mustang. Back in Lior, Ed faces Scar in an alley, only to be interrupted by Lust and Gluttony, the former of whom Scar stuns with the locket once belonging to his brother's fiancé after the two homunculi declare to help him create the Philosopher's Stone. When Gluttony retreats with the unconscious Lust recalling Scar's brother's fiancé's memories, Scar reveals his past to Ed, at the insistence of the now muted Rosé, with Lyra speaking for her. Before the war, Scar's brother lost his fiancé due to a fatal illness and tried to use alchemy to bring her back, but instead created Lust and that the locket is her weakness. His exiled brother then went on to create an incomplete Philosopher's Stone by using the souls of the Ishbalans who were dying in the war. In the ensuing chaos, Scar and his brother encounter Kimblee, who blew up Scar's original right arm and gave him the X-shaped scar on his forehead. Scar's brother, at the cost of his life, gave Scar his tattooed arm. Scar then reveals his plans to use the Grand Arcanum to create another Philosopher's Stone, but not by sacrificing the people of Lior, but by sacrificing the soldiers of the military. Führer Bradley arrives at the military base and has a private conversation with Kimblee. Bradley dispatches Kimblee to go into Lior with Tucker's chimeras and cause trouble, and to kill Ed when he sees him. Marta overhears this and discovers that Bradley is actually Pride, the seventh and final homunculus, whose Ultimate Eye is hidden under the eyepatch. She encounters Al and hides inside him to reveal the truth, but Bradley comes and sticks his sword inside Al, tragically killing Marta.
41	"Holy Mother"; Transliteration: "Seibo" (Japanese: 聖母)	Tamaki Nakatsu	Tamaki Nakatsu	Shō Aikawa	July 24, 2004	January 8, 2006
Scar, speaking for Rosé, tells the people of Lior to lure the military into the city, but not to provoke them. Kimblee, with a group of chimeras, attacks Lior. Scar instructs the civilians to leave the city through the underground tunnels, so that he can create the Philosopher's Stone aboveground when the military arrives. Ed sends a letter to Mustang explaining all that's happening in Lior, and advising him to keep the military from entering the city. Mustang and his group learn about what happened at Laboratory Five in Central, and how a Philosopher's Stone is made. Mustang tells Alphonse to go into Lior and find his brother, with Hawkeye giving Al his brother's pocket watch to return to him. Archer prepares to assault the city of Lior, but is ordered to wait by Bradley, who privately explains to Lust that he only did so upon their master's orders. Angry, Lust decides to go into Lior alone so she can help Scar create the Philosopher's Stone. Ed, Lyra, and Rosé help the civilians exit the city of Lior, only to be ambused by Wrath and Sloth. During the commotion, Sloth reveals herself as Ed and Al's creation when they failed to bring back their mother. Meanwhile, Scar confronts Kimblee, and they begin an alchemic battle, causing more destruction in the city. Alphonse intercedes by trapping Kimblee, who then escapes and destroys Scar's left arm before Scar maliciously blasts Kimblee's chest. The dying Kimblee quickly grabs Ed's pocket watch from Al's armor to throw it at Scar, exposing the red stones from inside that Scar painfully absorbs into his right tattooed arm, allowing Kimblee to begin turning Al's armor into a bomb. Wrath attempts to attack Rosé, who manages to speak and call out to Ed to get his attention.
42	"His Name is Unknown"; Transliteration: "Kare no Na o Shirazu" (Japanese: 彼の名を知らず)	Masakazu Hashimoto	Masakazu Hashimoto	Shō Aikawa	July 24, 2004	January 15, 2006
Al's armor slowly transforms into an explosive compound following Kimblee's attack, with Scar being the only one to help and save Al's life. Lust shows up, persuading Scar to abandon Al, disgusting Scar further as he understands that despite her resemblance, Lust is nothing like his brother's fiancée. Underground, Ed defeats Wrath and Sloth, helps Rosé get back with her people aboveground, and leaves Rosé with Lyra, determine to turn Scar over to the military. Mustang, Hawkeye, and Armstrong confront Archer and Tucker at the outpost, with Armstrong confessing he spied on Archer all along to report Archer's corruption within the military to Mustang. Archer leaves the trio to be attacked by Tucker's chimeras, but they defeat them. Meanwhile, Scar attaches the locket to Al's armor so Lust can't intervene and sacrifices his remaining arm with the tattooed symbols into Al's armor, nullifying Kimblee's alchemy while the tattooed symbols also appear on Al's armor. As Lust slowly begins reforming, she helps Scar use Kimblee's corpse as bait to lure the military, led by Archer, into the already destructed Lior. Scar gets himself shot a couple times by some soldiers before Lust kills them and they retreat to a safe spot. Scar admits to Lust that the Elric brothers' love for each other made him realize he did love his brother despite him going against the teachings of Ishbal. Scar and Lust go their separate ways, with Scar answering Lust's question that he doesn't have a real name and doesn't deserve one. Despite Ed's warning, Archer heads into Lior, while Scar uses the last of his strength to complete the Philosopher's Stone within Alphonse, transmuting himself and the soldiers within. After the activation, Ed rushes to Lior, only to encounter his brother, revealing the stone inside him. Lust tells the brothers they'd ought to make a run for it as the military and her homunculi brethren will be after them before she leaves.
43	"The Stray Dog"; Transliteration: "Norainu wa Nigedashita" (Japanese: 野良犬は逃げ出した)	Masahiro Andō	Masahiro Andō	Shō Aikawa	July 31, 2004	January 22, 2006
A complete stranger tries to strike up a conversation with Winry upon her and Sheska's arrival in Resembool. Pinako introduces him to Winry as Ed and Al's father, Hohenheim of Light. Meanwhile, the Elric brothers flee Lior through the desert. During which, a brief squabble between the boys causes an alchemic reaction within Al's armor, now the newly created Philosopher's Stone, that allows Al to recall his memoires regarding the Gate of Truth. Ed declares they have to head for Resembool despite it being the first place the military will look as he needs some things to help them in their fight against the homunculi. Meanwhile, Mustang and his brigade, on orders from Führer Bradley (Pride) to capture the boys, are in hot pursuit or otherwise, Mustang will have to face the military council himself. On a train bound for Central in a secret compartment, Lust is revealed to have been confined by the other homunculi for allowing the Elrics to flee. When Ross and Brosh arrive at Winry's house, they inform Winry and Sheska of the bulletin regarding the Elrics' new fugitive status. Noticing the river stream which the Elrics will come from, Winry and Sheska head out to find and help the Elrics, while Ross and Brosh stay behind to hinder the search party however they can. Still on the run with Al, Ed unintentionally causes Havoc to shoot himself and Fuery before the latter two are hospitalized. Winry and Sheska are taken in as leverages by Mustang and the other soldiers to get the Elrics to lower their guard and comply. Once the brothers are cornered, Mustang explains to them that the straw that broke the camel's back was when he executed Winry's parents during the Ishbal War on military orders and since then had motivated himself into becoming the Führer so as to not follow such unreasonable orders like that ever again. Furthermore, Mustang admits he is not after the boys due to military orders, but because he is angry at them for not seeking his protection.
44	"Hohenheim of Light"; Transliteration: "Hikari no Hōenhaimu" (Japanese: 光のホーエンハイム)	Tomokazu Tokoro, Seiji Mizushima	Tarō Iwasaki	Shō Aikawa	August 7, 2004	January 29, 2006
Rosé and Lyra descend a secret staircase in an old church and meet with the homunculi who bow to them. Meanwhile, the Elrics reveal to Mustang and his subordinates that Führer Bradley and his secretary Juliet Douglas are homunculi and thus, part of the conspiracy surrounding the Philosopher's Stone. The Elrics still keep Al's new status as the stone a secret, however. Discovering their father as the group arrive at the Rockbell home, Al is overjoyed but Ed is anguished. That night, Hohenheim shockingly overhears his sons' conversation about Lyra and Dante after the latter's apparent murder by Greed. Hohenheim then talks with Mustang about how homunculi need red stones to survive and that someone is likely behind all their actions, while answering Al's question that they cannot perform alchemy since they come from beyond the Gate of Truth. Hohenheim then spends the remaining night with Al as they discuss on how he can get his body back. That morning, Hohenheim disappears and Mustang leaves with his team to head back to Central and find out about Bradley's true colors for himself. Later, the Elrics and Sheska realize that the corrupted military's goal is to secretly create a Philosopher's Stone and hence, all the wars that have been happening thanks to the homunculi's instigation. This also causes Sheska to reveal Hughes was killed for learning too much, anguishing the Elrics further. Regardless, the Elrics reluctantly accept that Mustang only hid this fact from them so that they wouldn't blame themselves and that seeking vengeance doesn't solve anything. Hohenheim arrives where the homunculi are and instantly identifies Lyra as Dante, her soul now residing in Lyra's body, and thus, she's the homunculi's true leader. He exposes a piece of their respective rotten bodies as a result of their nonstop soul transferring and demands her to leave his sons alone. Meanwhile, Ed digs up his mother's grave to get some of her remains to use against Sloth.
45	"A Rotted Heart"; Transliteration: "Kokoro o Rekkasaseru Mono" (Japanese: 心を劣化させるもの)	Yukihiro Matsushita	Kazuki Tsunoda	Shō Aikawa	August 21, 2004	February 5, 2006
Hohenheim's confrontation with Dante continues, as their past 400 years ago is revealed. Nearly killed when he crafted the very first Philosopher's Stone he made for her using the souls of plague victims and those accused of witchcraft, Dante saved his life by performing her first soul transference and they have since been jumping between bodies. After Hohenheim became guilt-ridden and left her, Dante needed another alchemist, not willing to risk the fatal rebound of creating one herself. Back in Resembool, Tucker leaves a message for Al, which he hides from Ed. Back in Central, Mustang challenges the entire military leadership on his own, exposing Führer Bradley's secretary as an accomplice in the night of Hughes' murder. Visiting his subordinates, Mustang finally realizes the homunculi's instigation in the Ishbal War and their true motivation is to keep manipulating the military with desperate alchemists and soldiers creating wars in every campaign and sacrificing countless lives to secretly create a Philosopher's Stone and steal it to erase any evidence. Back at Dante's hideout, she refuses to accept and embrace death, just as Sloth arrives, leaving Hohenheim hallucinated and immobilized before Dante banishes him inside the Gate of Truth. Dante then dispatches Lust, Sloth, and Wrath to capture the stone inside Al and bring him to her. Meanwhile, Ed and Al depart from Resembool and take refugee at a motel in Central while Mustang meets with Armstrong to discuss Bradley secretly testing their motives now that they know the truth about the homunculi and the Ishbal War and that they will likely be killed on the front lines once they head north to silence them. Ed leaves Al behind to meet with Izumi at Dante's house to discuss the homunculi and their master, while Al meets with Tucker so he can teach him how to use the stone.
46	"Human Transmutation"; Transliteration: "Jintai Rensei" (Japanese: 人体錬成)	Shigeru Ueda	Shigeru Ueda	Shō Aikawa	August 28, 2004	February 12, 2006
Tucker makes a deal with Alphonse, offering to show him how to use the Philosopher's Stone in exchange for using the stone to resurrect his daughter Nina. Meanwhile, Izumi shows Ed a letter that is addressed from Dante to Hohenheim 400 years ago, making Ed realize that Dante is likely the leader of the homunculi. In Central, Führer Bradley (Pride) sees off Mustang and Armstrong, who have been promoted to Brigadier General and Lieutenant Colonel, respectively, on the campaign over the northern border into Drachma to retrieve the Elrics whom he believes are up there. The Führer mentions that Archer is still alive and will protect Central in their absence. Pride then meets with Dante, who informs him that Envy will kill all soldiers headed north. Envy arrives and refuses because Dante sent his creator, Hohenheim, beyond the gate, denying him revenge upon Hohenheim, but Dante gives Envy the opportunity kill Ed as a replacement and get the stone within Al. Lust, Sloth, and Wrath arrive at the Elrics' room. Seeing the note which Al left, Sloth heads out alone to capture Al and eliminate Tucker. Tucker begins the alchemical process using the same array from Lab 5, causing Al to partially erode, while Lust and Wrath ambush Ed when he returns to his and Al's room. Despite exposing the locket, Lust's weakness, to her, Ed is nearly killed by the two homunculi until Lust decides to betray their master and aid Ed in saving his brother from Sloth and Tucker in exchange that Ed make her human using the stone inside his brother. Lust helps Ed defeat Wrath before they leave and head to the warehouse factory, while Sloth arrives there to take Al to Dante and sees that Tucker has once again failed to revive Nina, as even with the stone, it couldn't call back her soul.
47	"Sealing the Homunculus"; Transliteration: "Homunkurusu Fūin" (Japanese: ホムンクルス封印)	Shingo Kaneko	Shingo Kaneko	Shō Aikawa	September 4, 2004	February 19, 2006
As Alphonse is led away by Sloth, unfortunately letting himself be manipulated and fooled into thinking she is his and Ed's mother, Trisha, Wrath slowly recovers in the street alley where Edward and Lust left him at. With Lust's help, Ed arrives at the warehouse and designs a trap for Sloth: the same transmutation circle array that was at Dante's house used against Greed to seal a homunculus. Furthermore, Edward exposes Sloth's weakness to her and Al--their mother's remains. Thanking Lust, Ed allows her to bat away the locket. However, Al throws Trisha's remains out through the window. Lust uses her Ultimate Spear to repeatedly strike Sloth while Ed heads out to get Trisha's remains and finish Sloth off, but Wrath beats him to it. Fusing Trisha's remains within his body, Wrath knocks Ed back into the building and transforms his left arm into a submachine gun to fire at Lust, allowing Sloth to break free and flee the scene by possessing Al. Lust has Ed pursue Sloth to rescue his brother while she stays behind to face Wrath. Unfortunately, during their fight, Lust ends up in the aforementioned circle intended for Sloth, and Wrath finds the locket she tossed away earlier, allowing him to use alchemy to seal and kill Lust. Meanwhile, Ed continues struggling in his fight with Sloth and freeing Al, while Sloth explains that she only wishes to kill the brothers to prove that she is nothing like their mother despite their mother's memories implanted in her. Wrath arrives and fuses himself with Sloth, forgetting about Trisha's remains still in his body. Ed uses this advantage to successfully kill Sloth by turning her into ethanol so that she can vaporize into the air.
48	"Goodbye"; Transliteration: "Sayōnara" (Japanese: さようなら)	Kenji Yasuda	Masakazu Hashimoto	Shō Aikawa	September 11, 2004	February 26, 2006
Entrenched at the northern border with Drachma, Armstrong declares his and Mustang's intention to rebel against the Führer. Meanwhile, as the Elrics and Wrath see Sloth evaporate, Envy enters, disguised as Winry, and kidnaps Alphonse. Edward begins to chase after Envy but is stopped by Wrath, who begins attacking him for killing Sloth. Izumi arrives, distracting Wrath, and he runs into the woods. Edward and Izumi leave to find the Führer. The Tringham brothers have arrived in Central with an important message for the Elric brothers. However, while in a bookstore, Russell pretends to be Edward again to get out of paying for some books. Unfortunately, Russell and Fletcher find themselves captured, the military believing them to be the real Elric brothers. The Führer sentences them to death, but they are saved by Ross and Brosh. The four of them run into Edward and Izumi, who are trying to find the Führer. However, they are confronted by Archer, who has been turned into a cyborg being. Izumi stays behind to face Archer with Ross and Brosh's help, allowing Ed, Russell, and Fletcher to leave. Trying to find another way to reach the Führer, Edward stops a car and notices Mustang and Hawkeye inside, both of whom having been hiding in Central all along so that Mustang can personally attack the Führer without him expecting. Mustang has Edward enter the car and during the car ride, the duo finally have a chance to repair their friendship before they go their separate ways.
49	"The Other Side of the Gate"; Transliteration: "Tobira no Mukō e" (Japanese: 扉の向こうへ)	Tamaki Nakatsu	Tamaki Nakatsu	Shō Aikawa	September 18, 2004	March 5, 2006
Envy delivers Alphonse to Dante's hideout in the underground city hidden beneath Central. Edward discovers the aforementioned city thanks to a page from Nash's diary given to him by Russell and Fletcher. Ed declares to them that he will personally rescue Al alone. Making his way down, Ed correctly guesses that the lives of the citizens have been sacrificed to fully forge the Philosopher's Stone and thus, the city remains lifelessly hidden beneath Amestris to erase all evidence, correctly summarizing that his father, Hohenheim, was involved. Rosé, who seems to be visibly in a trance, is dancing just as Ed arrives at Dante's hideout. Although Dante pretends to be Lyra yet again, Ed is now fully aware of Dante's identity, explaining the mistakes she made with her faked death back at her estate when he killed Greed after Dante weakened Greed down enough with the human remains in which Greed was originally based. Further fully aware of Dante's true age as well as her previous romantic relationship with his father and her motivation to continue cheating death through body switching by committing genocide to fully forge a Philosopher's Stone, Edward has a complex debate with Dante regarding morals and principles involving the concept of Equivalent Exchange. During which, Edward himself gets schooled and is unable to prove her wrong. She then sends Edward through the Gate of Truth and he awakens to find himself and Hohenheim in a wartorn London.
50	"Death"; Transliteration: "Shi" (Japanese: 死)	Masahiro Andō	Masahiro Andō	Shō Aikawa	September 25, 2004	March 12, 2006
Hohenheim explains to Edward that the parallel universe they're at is the other side of the gate, where the souls of the people who die here become the power source of alchemy in Amestris, and that science of physics developed instead of alchemy. Hohenheim further confesses he only left his family to avoid revealing his rotten body as a result of his multiple soul transfers. Unfortunately, Hohenheim is trapped in the parallel universe for good. Luckily for Ed, however, only his mind and soul have crossed over to the body of this universe's Ed, while Ed's real body is still at the gate. Hohenheim leaves, encouraging Ed to open the gate and return to his world. Meanwhile, with Hawkeye's help, Mustang sneaks into the Führer's mansion to confront him and avenge Hughes. Back at Dante's hideout, Gluttony and Wrath are still mourning the deaths of Lust and Sloth, respectively. Dante erases Gluttony's tattoo, turning him into a mindless eating machine, and has the gate remove Ed's limbs from Wrath's body, leaving Wrath wailing out on the floor. Ed returns from the parallel universe, but he is killed by Envy, revealed to be the very first homunculus created by Hohenheim after he failed to revive his and Dante's son who died of mercy poisoning. Ed's death causes Rosé to break out of the trance that Dante placed upon her as Rosé screams out to him in despair.
51	"Laws and Promises" ("Munich 1921"); Transliteration: "Myunhen Senkyūhyakunijūichi" (Japanese: ミュンヘン1921)	Seiji Mizushima, Kenji Yasuda	Kenji Yasuda, Kazuki Tsunoda	Shō Aikawa	October 2, 2004	March 19, 2006
Alphonse, at the cost of his life, using what's left of the Philosopher's Stone within him, revives Edward. Envy appears at the Gate of Truth, having failed to stop Al, and encounters Edward's soul. Learning that Hohenheim is still alive on the other side, Envy heads through against Ed's advice, disappearing into the distance as a green, serpentine dragon. Ed reawakens with his body, including his lost limbs, fully restored, but learns from Rosé about Al's sacrifice. After having Rosé take Wrath with her aboveground, Edward risks his life to revive his brother. Meanwhile, Mustang successfully kills Führer Bradley when his adoptive son Selim unintentionally weakens Bradley by bringing him the remains of the human from which the Führer was originally based. Bradley responsively strangles Selim before Mustang takes advantage. Taking the unconscious Selim with him, Mustang is confronted by Archer, who shoots him in the left eye. Hawkeye arrives in time to save Mustang's life and kills Archer. Dante escapes into an elevator to find the Führer to help her exact vengeance, only to be devoured by Gluttony, who fails to recognize her. Alphonse successfully has his body restored, but has lost his memories beyond the day when the brothers tried to resurrect their mother. Alphonse is back in Amestris and Edward is currently in Munich. The brothers both resolve to reunite again someday.

== Recap and OVAs ==
No.	Title	Original release date	English release date
SP	"Reflections"	April 27, 2005	N/A
A recap of the series, with sections narrated by the Elric brothers, Mustang, Hughes, Greed, and Envy.
1	"Chibi Party"	March 29, 2006	August 4, 2009
The premise is a wrap party for Fullmetal Alchemist the Movie: Conqueror of Shamballa, where the characters from both the theatrical release and the series are turned into chibi forms. Envy's dragon form is actually a costume which is revealed after he enters. After removing the costume, many characters confuse his androgynous form with that of a female. Hawkeye announces the party has begun, and several characters try to get the mic. Edward and Alphonse try to stop them but is trampled by. Two suits of armor go next and reveal they are Scar and Lust, who are mad that they only got a cameo in the movie. Scar rips off his cross-shaped scar and propels it across the room at Edward and Alphonse, but misses and strikes Gluttony who proceeds to eat everyone. Edward meets Heidrich, and Alphonse changes his voice to that of Heidrich in order to insult Edward. The Elric brothers then deal with a drunk Winry, who is furious at Edward because she thinks he is in a relationship with Noah.
2	"Kids"	March 29, 2006	August 4, 2009
This brief sequence shows three children, who bear exact resemblances to the Elric brothers and to Winry Rockbell, making a trip through a modern city. They travel alone to Edward's apartment. Edward is by then aged and also referred to as their great-great-grandfather. In the end, a text scrolls along the bottom-center that reads, "Edward will turn 100 in 2005, somewhere in this world..."
3	"Live Action"	March 29, 2006	August 4, 2009
Alphonse, in his armor form, embarks on a quest in a real-life Japan to find his brother Edward. His search eventually takes him to Studio Bones, where the series was produced, but due to his size he cannot fit through the door.
4	"Alchemists vs. Homunculi"	March 29, 2006	August 4, 2009
This short was originally shown at Universal Studios Japan. In this interactive short, the viewer is introduced as a new member of the military, welcomed by Fuhrer Bradley who assigns the viewer to Mustang's group. After a briefing on how the Fullmetal Alchemist world works, Mustang instructs his troops on a plot to rescue the Elric brothers from the homunculi. In the underground city, Greed has captured Edward, Alphonse and Winry, although Winry is revealed to be Envy in disguise and easily defeats Greed. Envy then lures the brothers into a trap set by Lust, Gluttony, Sloth, and Wrath. The fight leads to a ballroom where Mustang shows up, along with his troops and reinforcements including Armstrong, Kimblee, and Archer. A large battle follows which ends when the viewer activates an alchemy ring received from Mustang. Unfortunately, according to Armstrong, the viewer seems to have overdone it, and the building blows up as a result. Everyone survives, with Edward and Alphonse congratulating the viewer on their hard work before departing themselves.

== Home media release ==
=== Japanese ===
Aniplex (Japan, Region 2/A)
Volume	Discs	Episodes	Release date
1	1	1–2	December 17, 2003
2	1	3–6	January 21, 2004
3	1	7–10	March 24, 2004
4	1	11–14	April 28, 2004
5	1	15–18	May 26, 2004
6	1	19–22	June 23, 2004
7	2	23–26	July 28, 2004
8	1	27–30	August 25, 2004
9	1	31–34	September 29, 2004
10	1	35–38	October 27, 2004
11	1	39–42	November 26, 2004
12	1	43–46	December 22, 2004
13	1	47–51	January 26, 2005
Premium Collection	1	4 OVAs	March 29, 2006

=== English ===
Funimation (North America, Region 1/A)
Title	Discs	Episodes	Release date
Volume 1: The Curse	1	1–4	February 8, 2005
Volume 2: Scarred Man of the East	1	5–8	April 5, 2005
Volume 3: Equivalent Exchange	1	9–12	May 31, 2005
Volume 4: The Fall of Ishbal	1	13–16	July 26, 2005
Volume 5: The Cost of Living	1	17–20	September 20, 2005
Volume 6: Captured Souls	1	21–24	November 15, 2005
Volume 7: Reunion on Yock Island	1	25–28	January 10, 2006
Volume 8: The Altar of Stone	1	29–32	March 7, 2006
Volume 9: Pain and Lust	1	33–36	May 2, 2006
Volume 10: Journey to Ishbal	1	37–40	June 27, 2006
Volume 11: Becoming the Stone	1	41–44	August 1, 2006
Volume 12: The Truth Behind Truths	1	45–48	September 5, 2006
Volume 13: Brotherhood	1	49–51	September 12, 2006
Boxset Part 1	4	1–16	September 18, 2007
Boxset Part 2	3	17–28	November 20, 2007
Boxset Part 3	3	29–40	February 5, 2008
Boxset Part 4	3	41–51	March 11, 2008
Complete Series Part 1	4	1–25	January 27, 2009
Complete Series Part 2	4	26–51	March 10, 2009
Premium OVA Collection	1	4 OVAs	August 4, 2009
The Complete Series on Blu-ray	6	1–51	September 15, 2015
