= List of Fullmetal Alchemist light novels =

Cover of the Japanese release of the first Fullmetal Alchemist light novel

The Fullmetal Alchemist light novels are based on the manga series of the same name by Hiromu Arakawa. Fullmetal Alchemist began serialization in Square Enix's monthly manga anthology Monthly Shonen Gangan its August 2001 issue and concluded in June 2010. Square Enix has published a series of six light novel adaptations based on the series, all written by Makoto Inoue with illustrations provided by Arakawa. The novels follow the Elric brothers on their continued quest for the Philosopher's Stone. The first novel of the series, Fullmetal Alchemist: The Land of Sand, was used as the source material for episodes 11, 12 and part of 37 of the first Fullmetal Alchemist anime adaptation. The first novel was published in February 2003, and the sixth in March 2007.

Viz Media acquired the license for an English language release of the light novel series simultaneously with the license for the original manga. The Fullmetal Alchemist novels were one of the premiere titles for Viz's new Fiction imprint and were translated by Alexander O. Smith. The first five novels were released in North America from October 2005 to December 2007. The sixth novel, translated by Jan Mitsuko Cash and Asumi Shibata, was released in October 2021. Starting from December 2021 re-release of The Land of Sand, Viz published second editions of the first five light novels with new cover designs, and unlike the original releases they are also available digitally. The new release concluded with the new edition of The Ties That Bind in September 2022.

Square Enix has also published novelizations of their three Fullmetal Alchemist PlayStation 2 action role-playing video games: Fullmetal Alchemist and the Broken Angel, Curse of the Crimson Elixir, and The Girl Who Succeeds God and two Wii games: Prince of the Dawn and Daughter of the Dusk (in one volume). The first novel was written by Makoto Inoue; the next two by Jun Eishima, and the last by Sōji Machida. However, none of these have been published in English.

== Volumes ==
=== Light novels ===
No.	Title	Original release date	English release date
1	Fullmetal Alchemist: The Land of Sand; Sareki no Daichi (砂礫の大地)	February 28, 2003; 978-4-7575-0871-2	October 4, 2005; 978-1-4215-0155-0
Prologue; 1. Golden Hair; 2. Silver Eyes; 3. Crimson Water; Epilogue; The Phantom of Warehouse 13
Edward and Alphonse Elric continue their search for the Philosopher's Stone in the mining town of Xenotime where it is rumored that someone is trying to create gold out of stone to revive the dying city. When they arrive, they discover two brothers, Russell and Fletcher Tringham are using the Elric brothers' names to continue their father's research in the alchemic lab run by town leader Mugear. While Edward and Russell argue and fight over the name, the two younger brothers talk.
2	Fullmetal Alchemist: The Abducted Alchemist; Toraware no Renkinjutsushi (囚われの錬金術師)	September 26, 2003; 978-4-7575-1029-6	February 21, 2006; 978-1-4215-0222-9
1. The Borderlands Train; 2. The Odd Terrorists; 3. Lively Lodgings; 4. The Abduction of Edward; 5. Separate Battles
Train lines are being destroyed in a series of terrorist strikes. At the same time, a string of kidnappings targeting those related to the military takes place. However, nobody is harmed. Civilian anger mounts with each passing day, and the authorities seem powerless to catch the insurgents. Roy suspects that the two crimes sprees are connected, but he's having a tough time convincing his superiors in Central Command. Edward and Alphonse join in on investigations to catch the terrorists but soon finds themselves in the middle of a kidnapping, too.
3	Fullmetal Alchemist: The Valley of White Petals; Shiroi Hana no Mau Tani (白い花の舞う谷)	April 30, 2004; 978-4-7575-1198-9	May 16, 2006; 978-1-4215-0402-5
1. The Coronel's Conspiracy; 2. Paradise Below; 3. Unequivalent Exchange; 4. The Truth; 5. The Valley of White Petals
Roy sends Edward and Alphonse on a search for a supposedly nonexistent town named Wisteria, which has been rumored to be a paradise, in a desert, surprisingly. However, the town really does exist but is isolated from outside contact. Ed and Al are granted entrance into the town after helping Ruby, a girl who lives in Wisteria and serves as one of the best guards of the town to keep unwanted people from coming in. Ruby introduces the brothers to the mayor of the town, and explains that the town runs on the law of Equivalent Exchange, so everyone works to get in reward their needs. After exploring the town, Al considers staying there forever, while Ed questions the town's system. Ed then meets a young boy who has been friends with Ruby before they came to Wisteria, and Ed learns of the poverty in the town that falls upon those who cannot work like everyone else. Ed and Al set out to prove the mayor of the town wrong.
4	Fullmetal Alchemist: Under the Faraway Sky; Tōi Sora no Shita de (遠い空の下で)	October 29, 2004; 978-4-7575-1315-0	October 16, 2007; 978-1-4215-1397-3
Under the Faraway Sky; Roy's Holiday; Ed has caught a cold and is sidelined in a small village. While he reccuperates, Ed meets an old friend, but Ed and Al seem to be stuck in more ways than one. Colonel Mustang is sent to retrain troops in a remote area. When Hughes and Armstrong show up, the three decide to take a hike and encounter a village populated only by children.
5	Fullmetal Alchemist: The Ties That Bind; Sorezore no Kizuna (それぞれの絆)	June 30, 2005; 978-4-7575-1471-3	December 18, 2007; 978-1-4215-1431-4
Prologue; 1. The Banned Book; 2. Thicker than Blood; 3. Meetings and Encounters; 4. A Mistaken Wish; 5. Keep Moving On; Epilogue
While in Dublith, Ed and Al uncover a clue regarding a book called "The Evolution of the Body", which may hold information about how to recreate the body of a person who had been severely wounded or to reconstruct their entire original form. Ed and Al head to Lambsear to try to locate the book, but instead find an Ishballan orphan being raised by an Amestrian woman on her own, as her husband goes away for months at a time. The Elrics help reunite a family torn apart by old war wounds, and show a disillusioned man that some sins cannot be eradicated, but can be forgiven.
6	Fullmetal Alchemist: A New Beginning; Arata na Hajimari (新たなはじまり)	March 22, 2007; 978-4-7575-1984-8	October 12, 2021; 978-1-9747-2577-9
1. A New Beginning; 2. The Daily Hustle and Bustle of Rush Valley; 3. A Giant Mistake; 4. A Chain of Mistakes; 5. Listen to Your Heart; 6. Hope for the Future; Epilogue; Alphonse's Troubles
In Rush Valley, Winry starts working as an apprentice for Mr Garfiel, a somewhat unusual automail mechanic. Her view on how automail outfittees relate to their prosthetics changes as she meets a young boy who lost a leg only to have a badly fitted replacement leg which causes him regular pain. Winry struggles to win his trust so that she can give him the kind of leg he needs to improve his daily life, but his anger and distrust make her think of Ed. There is also a short story where Ed is interviewed for a news story. Ed's vanity is hugely stoked - until he sees the published result.

=== Video game novelizations ===
No.	Title	Japanese release date	Japanese ISBN
1	Fullmetal Alchemist and the Broken Angel; Tobenai Tenshi (翔べない天使)	July 30, 2004	978-4-7575-1247-4
The Elric brothers as being escorted to Central City via train by Major Alex Louis Armstrong. During the trip, the train is attacked by terrorists. The brothers and Armstrong deal with them, but the train is destroyed in the process and they find themselves in the town of New Heissgart. They meet a girl named Armony and learn of the Philosopher's Catalyst, an item used to increase the efficiency of alchemy that is nearly as powerful as the Philosopher's Stone itself. It seems to be directly linked with berserk chimeras running around the town, a rogue military force, and the gathering of alchemists in the town.
2	Fullmetal Alchemist: Curse of the Crimson Elixir; Akaki Erikushiru no Akuma (赤きエリクシルの悪魔)	December 24, 2004	978-4-7575-1345-7
Edward and Alphonse learn that people in Amestris have begun vanishing without a trace. Rumors say they are being spirited in away by "monsters", called Golems that have started appearing. They go to Resembool where they meet an alchemist named Jack Crowley and a strange creature called the Phantom. The two appear to be connected to the disappearances and to the Golems. Colonel Mustang sends the brothers, along with Riza Hawkeye to investigate one village being plagued by the monsters. In the village, an archaeologist named Arlen Glostner directs them to Siam-Sid, the capital city of the ancient civilization of Lebis to discover the truth behind the Golems and the disappearances.
3	Fullmetal Alchemist: The Girl who Succeeds God; Kami o Tsugu Shōjo (神を継ぐ少女)	November 1, 2005	978-4-7575-1570-3
4	Fullmetal Alchemist: Prince of the Dawn - Daughter of the Dusk; Akatsuki No Ōji - Tasogare no Shōjo (暁の王子-黄昏の少女)	April 22, 2010	978-4-7575-2866-6

== Reception ==
The first Fullmetal Alchemist novel, The Land of the Sand, was well received by Jarred Pine of Mania Entertainment as a self-contained novelization that remained true to the characterizations of the manga series. He said that while the lack of backstory aims it more towards fans of the franchise than new readers, it was an impressive debut piece for the Viz Fiction line. Ain't It Cool News also found the novel to be true to its roots, and said that while it added nothing new, it was compelling enough for followers of the series to enjoy a retelling. The reviewer said it was a "work for young-ish readers that's pretty clear about some darker sides of politics, economics and human nature". Charles Solomon of the Los Angeles Times said that the novel has a different focus than the anime series; The Land of Sand "created a stronger, sympathetic bond" between the younger brothers than is seen in its two-episode anime counterpart.
