= Edward Elric =

Titular character in the Fullmetal Alchemist media franchise

- Fullmetal Alchemist character
- Art by Hiromu Arakawa
- First appearance: Fullmetal Alchemist chapter 1, "The Two Alchemists" (2001)
- Created by: Hiromu Arakawa
- Portrayed by: Ryosuke Yamada (original); Rai Takahashi (young)
- Voiced by: Japanese: Romi Park; English: Vic Mignogna

In-universe information
- Title: Fullmetal Alchemist
- Occupation: State Alchemist
- Family: Van Hohenheim (father; deceased); Trisha Elric (mother; deceased); Alphonse Elric (brother); Envy (half-brother; deceased) (first anime only) Yuriy Rockbell (father-in-law; deceased) Sarah Rockbell (mother-in-law; deceased) Pinako Rockbell (grandmother-in-law)
- Spouse: Winry Rockbell
- Children: Unnamed son Unnamed daughter

Edward Elric (Japanese: エドワード・エルリック, Hepburn: Edowādo Erurikku) is a fictional character and the titular protagonist of the Fullmetal Alchemist manga series created by Hiromu Arakawa. Edward, titled the Fullmetal Alchemist (鋼の錬金術師, Hagane no Renkinjutsushi; lit. 'Alchemist of Steel'), is the youngest State Alchemist in the history of the fictional country of Amestris. His left leg was divinely severed in a failed attempt to resurrect his dead mother, and then his right arm was taken in exchange for his brother's soul. His missing limbs have been replaced with sophisticated prosthetics called automail (機械鎧(オートメイル), ōtomeiru). He and his younger brother, Alphonse, who lost his entire body and is spiritually bound to a suit of armor, scour the world in search of the Philosopher's Stone in the hopes of restoring their bodies. Edward has appeared in other media from the series, including video games, original video animations (OVAs) and light novels.

Numerous publications in various media have been written on the subject of Edward's character. Reviewers praised Edward as a balance between the typical clever kid and the stubborn kid persona. Additionally, his comedic moments have been celebrated as some of the best moments in the series. His Japanese and English voice actors, Romi Park and Vic Mignogna, have both been praised for their performances as Edward and have won several awards for their work. Numerous pieces of merchandise have been released bearing Edward's likeness, including key chains and action figures.

== Creation and conception ==
Author Hiromu Arakawa integrated several social problems into the plot, such as the way Edward and Alphonse live as brothers after the death of their mother, Trisha. She also looks at how the brothers help people all over the country to gain an understanding of the meaning of family. When describing the character's personality, Arakawa comments that after his father's departure from home and his mother's death, Edward tried to replace the role of the man for the Elric family. As a result, Van Hohenheim's reappearance caused a shocking and terrified reaction in the character. Arakawa has noted that Edward is one of her favorite characters from the series, although she denied having the same personality as him when one of her assistants mentioned it.

When comparing the two brothers during the time Alphonse obtained the ability to use alchemy without a circle like Edward, Arakawa stated nobody was better at alchemy as the two had different preferences in the same way as other alchemist appearing in the series. Although she claims she has not thought of the characters' birthdates, Arakawa noted that she decided Edward's birthdate during the series' serialization. During a chapter in which it was mentioned that Edward was about to be 16, winter was about to begin in Hokkaido, Arakawa's birthplace, so it was decided Edward's birthdate would be in winter. In a common slapstick gag from the series, Edward is often struck by Winry Rockbell's wrench. While commenting that Edward has the ability to easily dodge her, Arakawa comments that he gets hit on purpose as a result of his personality. The director of the first anime series, Seiji Mizushima, says that in the development of the story Edward "evolves and devolves"; Mizushima comments that Edward is continuously overcoming inner struggles in order to determine how to grow up. The appearance of his automail in the anime is used to symbolize the intangibles of his character, making viewers note that Edward lost something important.

In a prototype from the series, Edward was an eighteen-year-old teenager travelling alongside his father whose soul sealed in a flying squirrel. Edward's prototype had an average height, but retained his automail. In order to fit with the readers from the manga magazine Monthly Shonen Gangan, Edward's traits were further modified, leaving his current one. His height was reduced in order to contrast with Alphonse's huge armor. In the design of the character, Arakawa is often worried about not making his automail too bulky to avoid balancing it by increasing Edward's muscles, making his appearance unsuitable for his age. She has also often drawn the character in full body length, but at one point noticed she made it too tall. As the manga continued serialization, Arakawa found that she drew Edward half naked several times even more than Alex Louis Armstrong who tends to show his torso. While stating that this was because she wanted to draw Edward's automail, she commented that it was common for men to walk in underwear at their homes.

=== Casting ===
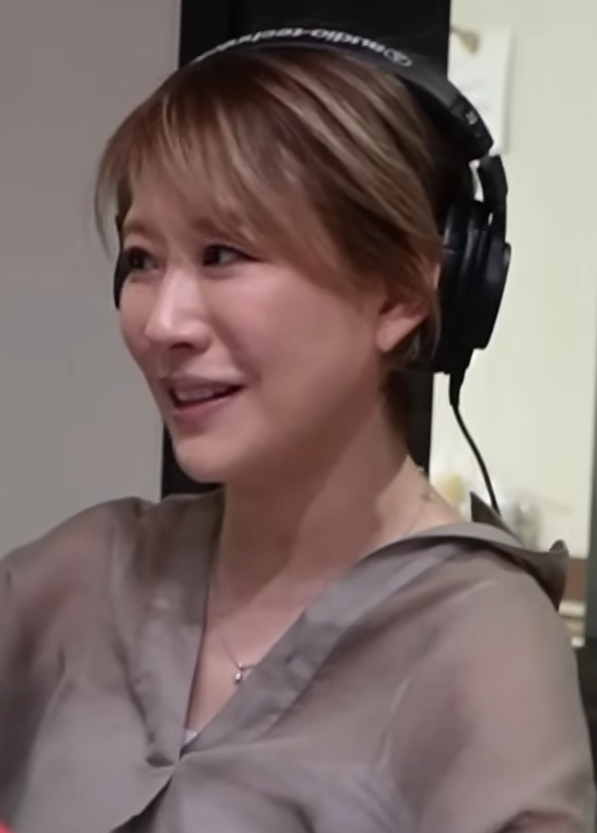
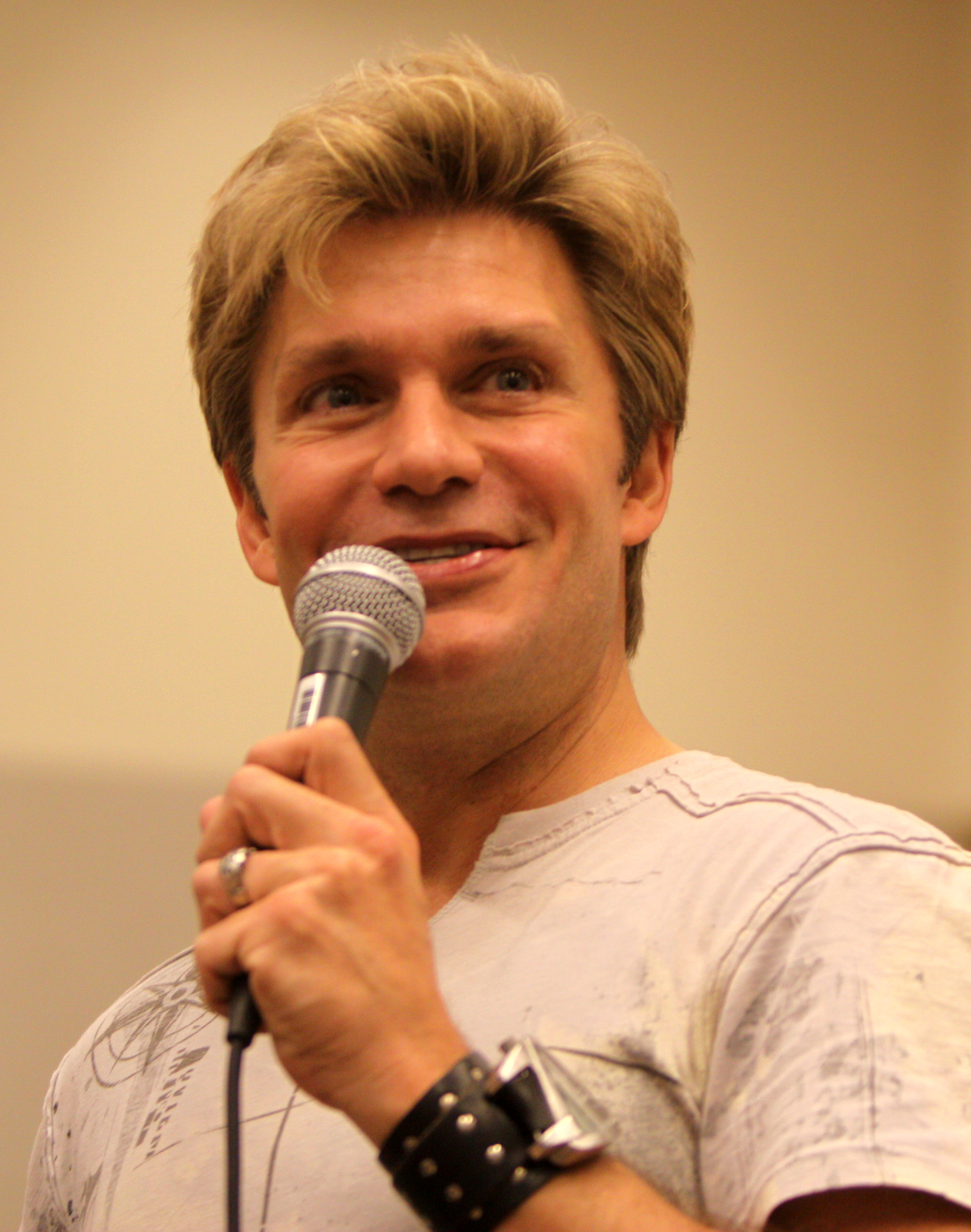
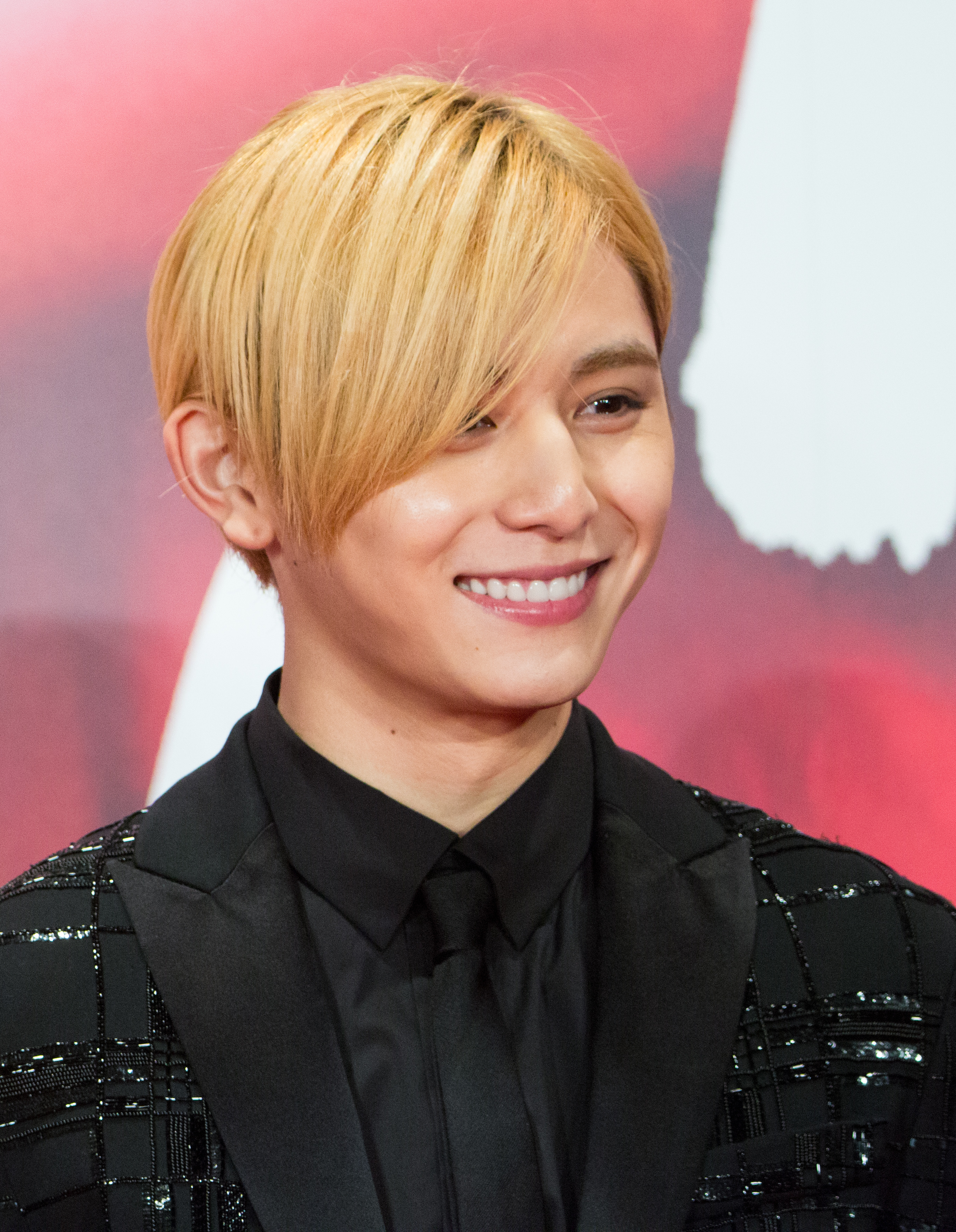
Romi Park (left) and Vic Mignogna (middle) voice Edward in Japanese and English, respectively. Ryosuke Yamada (right) portrayed him in the live-action films.

In the Japanese version of Fullmetal Alchemist's anime adaptations, Edward has been voiced by Romi Park. In the English version, the role has been played by Vic Mignogna. Mignogna has stated that performing Edward may be his biggest voice acting achievement since fans do not compare him with Park, noting that their voices are not similar and that he did not plan to sound like her.

Additionally, in the 2017 live-action film based on the series, Edward is portrayed by Ryosuke Yamada. Yamada thinks his short stature might be work as an advantage due to one of Edward's most common characteristics is his low height. Studying Arakawa's manga, Yamada tried imitating Edward's other signature actions such the way he runs. A fan of the series, the actor expressed happiness with the role he was given. Nevertheless, he asked at Anime Expo 2017 if anything from him looked "weird" which resulted in praise from the audience. During questions, Yamada said that one of the most difficult scenes about his acting is interacting with Alphonse as a result of the latter being CGI. As a result, in the shooting of some scenes the staff had a person in Alphonse's place so that Yamada had a better way to act.

== Appearances ==
=== In Fullmetal Alchemist ===
Edward was born in a small town named Resembool in the nation of Amestris, living with his younger brother Alphonse and their parents Trisha Elric and Van Hohenheim. After Hohenheim left the family on a journey early in their lives, Edward developed a loathing for their father as he and Alphonse learned to use alchemy before Trisha died of an illness years later. The two brothers concentrated on studying alchemy in the hopes of bringing their mother back to life, and trained with a skilled alchemist named Izumi Curtis. When they make the attempt to revive their mother, it failed and the brothers paid a bigger price via the Law of Equivalent Exchange: which states that every outcome requires an equal payment. Edward lost his left leg while meeting the metaphysical being known as Truth (真理, Shinri), gaining great knowledge as well as the prodigious ability to perform transmutations just by clapping his hands together without the need of a Transmutation Circle. As Alphonse's entire being was taken by Truth, Edward uses his newly gained knowledge in sacrificing his own right arm to retrieve Alphonse's soul and bind it to a nearby suit of armor.

While being outfitted prosthetic "automail" limbs by the grandmother of his childhood friend, Winry Rockbell, Edward became motivated to restore Alphonse, Edward joins the State Military due to Roy Mustang's guide. He becomes the youngest State Alchemist, receiving the title of "Fullmetal Alchemist" shortly thereafter from the military head, Führer King Bradley. For the next few years, the Elric Brothers begin an extensive search for the legendary Philosopher's Stone in order to restore their bodies. Besides his abilities as an alchemist, Edward is a formidable fighter as a result of his training with Izumi, who had extensively trained both brothers in martial arts.

During their search for the Stone, Edward and Alphonse had a near-death experience when attacked by Scar, a vengeful Ishvalan targeting State Alchemists for the mass murder of his people during the Ishvalan Civil War. They also meet a former State Alchemist Tim Marcoh who gives them the method of creating a Philosopher's Stone. The brothers later get revelations in the form of immortal beings known as the homunculi. When Edward and Alphonse discover that the homunculi and the Philosopher's Stone are related, they work together with Mustang and the Xingese prince Lin Yao to find them. But the Elric brothers meet the homunculus whom the homunculi call "Father," who is the true leader of Amestris with Bradley being a human-based homunculus. The brothers are forced to keep working with the military as Bradley uses Winry as a hostage.

Forced to comply, the Elrics travel to the northern area of the country in order where they eventually reveal what they know to General Olivier Mira Armstrong while dealing with the homunculus Sloth. Shortly after their arrival, the State Alchemist Solf J. Kimblee bring Winry to the north as a hostage, unbeknownst to Winry, to force Edward's help in hunting Scar. But the brothers and Scar made their peace as they end up using his help so Alphonse can take Winry to safety. Upon their success, joined by Lin after he willingly became a host for Greed, Edward learns the Father's full plan of making a massive human transmutation circle out of the country of Amestris to create a Philosopher's Stone. Edward later reunites with Alphonse and their father as they and their allies formulate an attack on Central City from all sides.

The group make their way into the underground complex while dispatching many of the homunculi, but the Elric Brothers, Izumi, Honenhiem, and Mustang are captured by Father who uses them to absorb the souls of Amestrians to absorb the being beyond the Gate of Truth. But Honenheim and Scar act out their backup plans to return the recently stolen souls to their bodies and enable every alchemist to fighting the severely weakened Father. Joining the fray after defeating Pride, Edward loses his automail while battling Father. Alphonse transmutes his soul in order to restore Edward's original flesh-and-blood arm. After defeating Father, Edward manages to bring Alphonse back by sacrificing his own ability to use alchemy. The brothers return to their hometown to live normal lives, but are motivated by the memories of Nina and others they failed to save to learn new methods of alchemy to prevent such tragedies from being repeated. Two years later, Edward decides to head westward for their research with Winry accompanying him as they progressively developed a romantic relationship over the course of their adventure and eventually confessed their feelings to each other. In the epilogue, Edward and Winry are revealed to have married and have a son and daughter together.

=== In the first anime ===
Although following the series storyline to an extent, the first anime's storyline diverts with Edward learning the secret to destroying a homunculus during his encounter with Greed, whom he kills in an effort to save Alphonse. When he learns of Scar's creation of a Philosopher's Stone within Alphonse, Edward saves the people of Lior from being sacrificed for its creation. During his battle against the homunculi, Edward is killed by Envy, who is revealed to be Edward and Alphose's half-brother, but Alphonse trades himself for his brother's revival. In doing so, however, Alphonse's armor with the philosopher's stone within it is used up and he disappears. After being revived, Edward sacrifices his own life to bring back his brother in exchange. As a result, Edward finds himself on the other side of the Gate, a parallel world which greatly resembles the real world during World War II, while Alphonse recovers his original body. Determined to return to Alphonse, Edward becomes involved in rocketry research in Germany, with the intention of using that technology to return to his home world. In the feature film, Fullmetal Alchemist the Movie: Conqueror of Shamballa, set two years after the end of the anime, Edward has been living in Germany and looks for a way to return to his world. At the film's end, he decides to stay in the parallel world along with Alphonse so that they may try to protect both worlds.

=== In other media ===
Edward also appears in almost all the Fullmetal Alchemist original video animations (OVAs). In the first OVA he appears as a super deformed version of himself at the movie's wrap-up party; in the second, he appears shortly as an old man living in modern-day Tokyo; and in the third OVA, he plays a part in the battle against the first anime's homunculi. As the series' titular character, Edward is playable in all Fullmetal Alchemist video games. The three games for the PlayStation 2 – Fullmetal Alchemist and the Broken Angel, Curse of the Crimson Elixir and Kami o Tsugu Shōjo – feature exclusive stories in which the Elrics keep searching for the Philosopher's Stone. In the Nintendo DS game, Fullmetal Alchemist Dual Sympathy, he and Alphonse replay the first anime series. He is also featured in the Fullmetal Alchemist Trading Card Game. There are two character CDs featuring tracks based on Edward's character. The first is named Hagaren Song File – Edward Elric (Hagaren Song File – エドワード・エルリック) and the second Theme of Edward Elric. Both albums were performed by Ed's Japanese voice actress, Romi Park. He also appears in each light novel written by Makoto Inoue which continue Edward and Alphonse's search for the Philosopher's Stone and at the same time feature different stories from the ones appearing the manga and the anime.

== Reception ==
=== Popularity ===
Edward's character has been well received by manga readers; in each of the popularity polls made by Monthly Shōnen Gangan he has ranked first. Edward also won the Twenty-sixth Annual Animage Readers' Poll, Anime Grand Prix, in the "Favorite Male Character"; Romi Park, who voices Edward in Japanese, won in the "Favorite Seiyu" category. Edward maintained a high place in the next year's poll in the same category. In the July 2009 issue of Newtype, Edward ranked at the top of the survey Male Character Rankings. In the August 2009 issue his rank changed to fourth. In a Newtype poll from March 2010, Edward was voted as the fourth most popular male anime character from the 2000s. In the Anime Awards 2006 from About.com, Edward won in the category "Best Lead Character – Male". He was also seventh in IGN's 2009 Top 25 Anime Characters of All Time with writer Chris Mackenzie saying, "[Edward] and his kid brother Al make one of the best action-comedy teams in recent memory". In 2014, IGN ranked him as the eighth greatest anime character of all time, saying that "In Edward we had a character who was truly multidimensional. He could be comedic and pull off wild takes and sight gags. He could be placed in the most tragic circumstances and portray the deepest kind of sadness. He could be a complete badass, but he could also be the nicest guy on the planet." Several pieces of merchandise have been released in Edward's likeness, including plush toys, action figures, and key-chains. Vic Mignogna, who performs the voice of Edward in the English dub, was the winner in American Anime Awards in the category "Best Actor" for voicing Edward. In a poll by Anime News Network, he was voted as the 5th best "guy".

=== Critical response ===
Several publications for manga, anime, and other pop culture media have provided both praise and criticism on Edward's character. IGN writer Hilary Goldstein praises Edward as the perfect balance between the typical clever kid and the stubborn kid persona, explaining that this allows the character to "float between comical moments and underlying drama without seeming false." Additionally, Melissa Harper from Anime News Network praises Edward's facial expressions as some of the most humorous highlights of the series, including also the moments in which he reacts quite violently to comments about his small stature. They also praise him for not being a stereotypical shōnen character as it is noted that he has "very real skills, relationships, and personality".

Samuel Arbogast from T.H.E.M. Anime Reviews also comments that the interaction between the Elric brothers as they travel is interesting, and praises their humor scenes as they help to balance the dark parts of the series. Similarly, Mania Entertainment's Jarred Pine liked the dynamic between the Elrics brothers as while Edward is often faced with following "dark paths" in the same way as villains with the series, he is always supported by Alphonse who makes sure he is okay. When reviewing the video game Fullmetal Alchemist and the Broken Angel, RPGFan's Neal Chandran enjoyed the dynamic between the main characters both in fights as well as dialogues.

Judge Joel Pearce from DVD Verdict commented on Edward's journey, considering it very complex morally because he is trying to do good within a morally questionable organization. Lydia Hojnacki listed Edward as one of the reasons she likes Fullmetal Alchemist, noting the progression of the character's personality throughout the series, from simple maturity to a deeper sensitivity. The character was noted to go through a notable development in the manga after meeting his father by Holly Ellingwood from Active Anime as it made him decide to see the investigate from the human he and Alphonse created as children which led him to find a clue about how to recover his brother's body. On the other hand, Maria Lin from Animefringe criticized Edward's development in the first animated adaptation of Fullmetal Alchemist, as in the series' finale he once again attempted to resurrect a human.

=== Analysis ===
In (Fullmetal) alchemy: the monstrosity of reading words and pictures in shonen manga, Lesley-Anne Gallacher addressed how the backstory of Edward and Alphonse's failed attempt to revive their mother relate to Shou Tucker's plan to combine his daughter Nina and dog into a monster named chimera. During the discovery of this, Edward and Alphonse are given their own contrast in terms of characterization with the former showing early shock due to understanding what happened to Nina. Nevertheless, Alphonse later reacts violently too once understanding the identity of the chimera. As a result, the writer believes the story "weaken the boundaries between different realms of representation is to compromise the integrity of them all". Piotr Konieczny in The Encyclopedia of Science Fiction said both Mustang and Edward reject metaphysical consolation", and instead claim that humans must confrot suffering and injustice while obtaining resposibilty, knowledge and action.

Julie Sadlier from York University notes how complex is Edward's case of disability despite being a supercrip through his automail; despite acquiring these metallic limbs, Edward still feels at traumatized from his past and searches for a way to recover his lost arm and leg. Sadlier further commented on Edward's past, comparing it with Ishvalian's civil war who also suffered a tragic loss, most notably the antagonistic Scar who also lost his arm. Other foils noticed by the writer are Lan Fan who amputated herself to aid Ling Yao while noting that through his automail, Arakawa managed to link Edward with Alphonse and Winry. Tien-yi Chao from Intellect commented on Edward's characterization in the film Conqueror of Shamballa. Across the movie, Edward meets parallel version of people he met including Maes Hughes (a Nazi soldier with the same name) and King Bradley, (a Jewish film director named Fritz Lang), who behave differently from their Amestris counterparts. Chao addresses that through this exchanges the film also parallels itself from Arakawa's original work that takes a different path in terms of story. Nevertheless, Edward also faces the idea of going back to Amestris and comes in terms with Earth during the climax: in confrontation to Exckhart from the Thule Society, Edward notes that both worlds share similar issues, most notably wars which might become easier to occur if the worlds are connected. As a result, Edward and Alphonse decide to live in the real world in order to protect it from nuclear weapons mentioned across the story.
