= Fullmetal Alchemist =

Japanese manga series by Hiromu Arakawa

- First tankōbon volume cover, featuring siblings Edward (right) and Alphonse Elric (left)

鋼の錬金術師 (Hagane no Renkinjutsushi)
- Genre: Adventure; Dark fantasy; Steampunk
- Manga
- Written by: Hiromu Arakawa
- Published by: Enix (2001–03); Square Enix (2003–10)
- English publisher: AUS: Madman Entertainment; NA: Viz Media; Yen Press (digital); SG: Chuang Yi
- Imprint: Gangan Comics
- Magazine: Monthly Shōnen Gangan
- Original run: July 12, 2001 – June 11, 2010
- Volumes: 27
- Light novel
- Written by: Makoto Inoue
- Illustrated by: Hiromu Arakawa
- Published by: Square Enix
- English publisher: NA: Viz Media
- Original run: February 28, 2003 – April 22, 2010
- Volumes: 10
- Anime television series
- Fullmetal Alchemist (2003–04); Conqueror of Shamballa (2005 film); Fullmetal Alchemist: Brotherhood (2009–10); The Sacred Star of Milos (2011 film)
- Live-action film
- Fullmetal Alchemist (2017); Fullmetal Alchemist: The Revenge of Scar (2022); Fullmetal Alchemist: The Last Transmutation (2022)
- icon

Fullmetal Alchemist (Japanese: 鋼の錬金術師, Hepburn: Hagane no Renkinjutsushi; lit. 'Alchemist of Steel') is a Japanese manga series written and illustrated by Hiromu Arakawa. It was serialized in Square Enix's shōnen manga anthology magazine Monthly Shōnen Gangan between July 2001 and June 2010; the publisher later collected the individual chapters in 27 tankōbon volumes. Set in a fictional universe in which alchemy is a widely practiced science, the series follows the journey of two alchemist brothers, Edward and Alphonse Elric, as they search for the philosopher's stone to restore their bodies after a failed attempt to bring their mother back to life via alchemy. The steampunk world of Fullmetal Alchemist is primarily styled after the European Industrial Revolution.

The manga has been adapted into various anime—two television series, released in 2003 and 2009, and two films, released in 2005 and 2011, all animated by Bones—as well as light novels. The series also includes original video animations (OVAs), video games, supplementary books, a collectible card game, and a variety of action figures and other merchandise. A live-action film based on the series was released in 2017, with two sequels in 2022. In North America, the manga was localized and published in English by Viz Media. Yen Press has owned the rights for the digital release of the volumes since 2014.

Fullmetal Alchemist has received widespread acclaim from critics and audiences alike and is considered one of the greatest manga series of all time. It has sold over 90 million copies worldwide, placing it among the best-selling manga series. It received the 49th Shogakukan Manga Award for the shōnen category in 2004, the UK's Eagle Award for favorite manga in 2010 and 2011, and the Seiun Award for best science fiction comic in 2011.

== Synopsis ==
=== Setting ===
Fullmetal Alchemist takes place in the fictional country of Amestris (アメストリス, Amesutorisu), in which the physical setting and political system is largely inspired by general European society at the turn of the 20th century. In this world, alchemy is one of the most-practiced sciences, and can largely be contexualized as magic which follows the rules of science. By drawing patterns called Transmutation Circles, alchemists have the ability to create or form almost anything from physical substances that already exist. Alchemists who are skilled enough to be recruited by the government are known as State Alchemists (国家錬金術師, Kokka Renkinjutsushi) and are given code names as an identifier based on their unique area of expertise. As per the rules of science, transmutation cannot be successful if used to attempt to create something without all parts present, which is a natural law called the Law of Equivalent Exchange, which is presented as "to obtain, something of equal value must be lost". The one taboo in alchemy is Human Transmutation, which is the attempt to create a human from the substances found in the human body. Under natural circumstances, human transmutation will always fail as there is no natural physical substance that equals a human soul. Any resulting transmutation is botched, and results in an incomplete human form that dies immediately after creation. Those who attempt human transmutation are confronted by Truth (真理, Shinri), a pantheistic and semi-cerebral godlike being who appears as a reflection of the alchemist themselves, and is a divine entity that regulates all alchemy use. In order to rectify the attempted non-equivalent exchange, Truth often takes a part of the alchemist's own physical body as punishment for attempting to create something from nothing. The flesh parts in which Truth takes are often symbolic to what the alchemist values most in their life, or what they attempted to acquire through the botched transmutation.

Truth also shows these alchemists the Gate of Truth (真理の扉, Shinri no Tobira), where they are shown all the information in the universe simultaneously. This experience often drives the alchemists mad, but those who survive with their minds intact, gain the knowledge to transmute without a circle. All living things possess their own Gate of Truth, and per the Gaea hypothesis, heavenly bodies like planets also have their own Gates of Truth. There is only one possible way to bypass the Law of Equivalent Exchange for human transmutation, and that's by using a philosopher's stone in place of a soul. A philosopher's stone is a substance that has been made by trapping thousands of human souls through alchemy. This substance can then be used to transmute fully functional artificial humans called Homunculi. Most Homunculi have numerous superhuman abilities like regeneration which is accomplished through them using the trapped souls inside their philosopher's stones as fuel for this ability. They typically do not age and can only be killed by destroying or exhausting the power of their philosopher's stone.

There are several cities throughout Amestris. The main setting is the capital of Central City (セントラルシティ, Sentoraru Shiti), along with other military cities such as the northern city of Briggs (ブリッグズ, Burigguzu). Towns featured include Resembool (リゼンブール, Rizenbūru), the rural hometown of the Elrics; Liore (リオール, Riōru), a city deceived into following a cult; Rush Valley (ラッシュバレー, Rasshu Barē), a town that specializes in automail manufacturing—a procedure that provides prosthetic mechanical limbs; and Ishbal, a conservative, religious region that was annexed by Amestris and rejects alchemy. Ishbal suffered near-destruction in the Ishbalan Civil War, a genocide instigated after an Amestrian soldier shot and killed an Ishbalan child. Outside of Amestris, there are few named countries, and none are seen in the main story. The primary foreign country is Xing. Heavily reminiscent of China, Xing has a complex system of clans and emperors, as opposed to Amestris's government-controlled election of a Führer. It also has its own system of alchemy, called alkahestry (錬丹術, rentanjutsu), which is more medical and can be bi-located using kunai; in turn, it is implied that all countries have different forms of alchemy.

=== Plot ===
Edward and Alphonse Elric lived in the small village of Resembool with their mother Trisha and father Van Hohenheim. For unknown reasons, Hohenheim abandoned them, and Trisha soon died from an illness. After finishing their alchemy training under Izumi Curtis, the Elrics attempted the forbidden alchemical practice of human transmutation to resurrect their mother. However, the transmutation backfired, and Edward lost his left leg while Alphonse lost his entire body. Edward sacrificed his right arm to retrieve Alphonse's soul, binding it to a suit of armor. Edward was invited by colonel Roy Mustang to become a State Alchemist and research a way to restore their bodies, undergoing a painful automail procedure. Edward became a State Alchemist, acquiring the title of "Fullmetal Alchemist". The Elrics spend the next three years searching for the philosopher's stone to restore their bodies.

The Elrics are eventually attacked by an Ishbalan serial killer known as Scar, who targets State Alchemists in revenge for his people's genocide in the Ishbalan Civil War. Returning to Resembool to have Edward's limbs repaired by their childhood friend and mechanic, Winry Rockbell, the Elrics meet Dr. Marcoh, who provides them with information revealing philosopher's stones are created from human souls. They investigate a laboratory in which the Stones were created, but are hindered by the Homunculi. The Elrics decide to visit Izumi, hoping to improve their alchemy. Mustang's friend Maes Hughes continues the Elrics' research and discovers government conspiracy, but is killed by the homunculus Envy. The Elrics learn that Izumi also performed human transmutation, having attempted to use alchemy to revive her stillborn child. Alphonse is captured by the homunculus Greed, but is rescued by Amestris' leader King Bradley. Bradley is revealed to be the homunculus Wrath and brings the captured Greed to the Homunculi's creator, Father. When Greed refuses to rejoin his fellow Homunculi, he is reabsorbed by Father.

After meeting the Xingese prince Lin Yao, who seeks a philosopher's stone to cement his position as heir to his country's throne, the Elrics return to Central City, where they learn of Hughes's murder. Lieutenant Maria Ross is framed for Hughes' murder, so Mustang fakes Ross's death and smuggles her out of the country. In encounters with the Homunculi, Mustang kills Lust. Lin captures Gluttony, who swallows Lin, Edward, and Envy into his void-like stomach. They escape from Gluttony's stomach after he takes Alphonse to meet Father, who makes Lin the vessel of Greed. Mustang tries to expose Bradley to the government but finds that the higher officials are complicit in Father's plans. The Elrics and Mustang are released, but warned not to oppose Father, who seeks to use them as "human sacrifices". Meanwhile, Scar heads north with the Xingese princess May Chang, former corrupt official Yoki, and a kidnapped Dr. Marcoh.

The Elrics head north as well, and reach Fort Briggs, commanded by General Olivier Armstrong. They confront the homunculus Sloth and learn that Father founded Amestris to amass a population large enough to create a massive philosopher's stone. With it, he plans to achieve godhood by absorbing the being beyond the Gate of Truth on the "Promised Day". Forced to work with Solf J. Kimblee, a murderous former State Alchemist and ally of the Homunculi, the Elrics turn on him and split up, joined by a reformed Scar, his group, Kimblee's chimera subordinates, and later Lin/Greed. Riza Hawkeye discovers that King Bradley's son Selim is the homunculus Pride. Hohenheim reveals that he was made an immortal when Father arranged the fall of Cselkcess (クセルクセス, Kuserukusesu) (Note: The name of the country was intended to be spelled as "Xerxes". Jason Thompson, who had worked for Viz Media as an editor on the first volumes of the manga, acknowledged that the English release spelling was incorrect, and stated that its original name was hard to transliterate from katakana.) four centuries ago and had been working since then to stop Father.

The Promised Day arrives, with Father planning to use a solar eclipse and 'human sacrifices'— alchemists who have performed human transmutation — to trigger his own transmutation. Wrath and Pride force Mustang to perform a human transmutation, and he is blinded as a result. The Elrics and their comrades battle Father's minions; Kimblee and all of the Homunculi, except Greed and Pride—the latter of whom is reduced to an infant by Edward—are killed. However, Father manages to activate the nationwide transmutation circle and absorbs the superior being. Hohenheim and Scar activate countermeasures, draining much of Father's absorbed souls, and rendering him unstable. The Elrics and their comrades face Father, who nearly destroys Alphonse's armor. Alphonse sacrifices his soul to restore Edward's right arm. Greed sacrifices his life to save Lin. Edward defeats Father, who is dragged into the Gate of Truth. Edward sacrifices his ability to perform alchemy to fully restore Alphonse, while Lin receives a philosopher's stone. Hohenheim goes to visit Trisha's grave, where he dies peacefully. The Elrics return home and then go their separate ways two years later to further research alchemy. Years later, Edward and Winry marry and have two children.

== Production ==
=== Development ===
After reading about the concept of the philosopher's stone, Arakawa became interested to the idea of characters using alchemy in her manga. She began reading books about alchemy, which she found complicated because some books contradicted others. Arakawa was more interested with the philosophical aspects of alchemy than the practical ones. For the concept of Equivalent Exchange (等価交換, Tōka Kōkan), she was inspired by the work of her parents, who had a farm in Hokkaido and worked hard to earn money to eat.

Arakawa wanted to integrate social issues into the story. Her research involved watching television news programs and talking to refugees, war veterans and former yakuza. Several plot elements, such as Pinako Rockbell caring for the Elric brothers after their mother dies, and the brothers helping people to understand the meaning of family, expand on these themes. When creating the fictional world of Fullmetal Alchemist, Arakawa was inspired after reading about the Industrial Revolution in Europe; she was amazed at the differences in culture, architecture, and clothes of the era from those of her own culture. She was especially interested in England during this period and incorporated these influences into the manga, leading to the series having a steampunk setting (also described as dieselpunk). The Ishbal region bears similarities to the Middle East, with the plot developments in Ishbal being influenced by invasions from Western powers that occurred in the region during the 20th century.

When the manga began serialization, Arakawa was considering several major plot points, including the ending. She wanted the Elric brothers to recover their bodies—at least partly. As the plot continued, she thought that some characters were maturing and decided to change some scenes. Arakawa cited manga authors Suihō Tagawa and Hiroyuki Eto as her main inspirations for her character designs; she described her artwork as a mix of both of their styles. Arakawa found that the easiest of the series's characters to draw were Alex Louis Armstrong and the little animals. Arakawa liked dogs, so she included several of them in the story. She also made comedy central to the story because she viewed manga as being intended for entertainment, and she tried to minimize sad scenes.

=== Conclusion ===
When around forty manga chapters had been published, Arakawa said that as the series was nearing its end and she would try to increase the pace of the narrative. To avoid making some chapters less entertaining than others, unnecessary details from each of them were removed and a climax was developed. The removal of minor details was also necessary because Arakawa had too few pages in Monthly Shōnen Gangan to include all the story content she wanted to add. Some characters' appearances were limited in some chapters. At first, Arakawa thought the series would make up 21 volumes, but the number increased to 27. Serialization finished after nine years, and Arakawa was satisfied with her work because she had told everything she desired to tell with the manga.

During the development of the original anime, Arakawa allowed the anime staff to work independently from her and requested a different ending from that of the manga. She said that she would not like to repeat the same ending in both media, and wanted to make the manga longer so she could develop the characters. When watching the ending of the anime, she was amazed about how different the homunculi were from her original work and enjoyed how the staff speculated about the origins of the villains. Because Arakawa helped the Bones staff in the making of the series, she was kept from focusing on the manga's cover illustrations and had little time to draw them.

=== Themes and analysis ===
Fullmetal Alchemist explores social issues such as discrimination, scientific progress, political greed, brotherhood, family, and war. Scar's backstory and his hatred for the State Military appear to reference the Ainu people, whose land was seized by outsiders. The series also examines the consequences of guerrilla warfare and the potential for unchecked militarization. Some of those who displaced the Ainu were originally Ainu themselves—an irony reflected in Scar's use of alchemy, forbidden by his religion, to kill alchemists. The Elric brothers' orphanhood and adoption by Pinako Rockbell highlight societal responsibilities toward orphans, while the characters' dedication to their work underscores the necessity of labor for survival. The series also delves into the principle of equivalent exchange—the idea that obtaining something requires sacrificing something of equal value. This concept governs alchemical transmutation and serves as a philosophical tenet for the Elric brothers.

== Media ==
=== Manga ===
Written and illustrated by Hiromu Arakawa, Fullmetal Alchemist was serialized in Square Enix's monthly manga magazine Monthly Shōnen Gangan. Its first installment was published in the magazine's August 2001 issue on July 12, 2001. The series concluded with the 108th installment in the July 2010 issue of Monthly Shōnen Gangan, published on June 11, 2010. A side-story was published in the same magazine on September 11, 2010. In the July 2011 issue, the prototype version of the manga was published. Square Enix compiled the chapters in 27 tankōbon volumes, released from January 22, 2002, to November 22, 2010. A few chapters were re-released in Japan in two "Extra number" magazines and Fullmetal Alchemist, The First Attack, which features the first nine chapters of the manga and other side stories. Square Enix republished the series in 18 kanzenban volumes from June 22, 2011, to September 22, 2012.

In North America, Viz Media licensed the series for an English language release in North America and published the 27 volumes between May 3, 2005, and December 20, 2011. From June 7, 2011, to November 11, 2014, Viz Media published the series in an omnibus format, featuring three volumes in one. In April 2014, Yen Press announced the rights for the digital release of the volumes in North America, and on December 12, 2016, released the series on the ComiXology website. Viz Media published the 18-volume kanzenban edition, as Fullmetal Alchemist: Fullmetal Edition, from May 8, 2018, to August 23, 2022.

Other English localizations were done by Madman Entertainment in Australasia and Chuang Yi in Singapore. A full-color Webtoon version, reformatted for the platform's vertical-scroll format, launched on May 7, 2025, with new chapters released twice a week.

=== Anime series ===
Fullmetal Alchemist has been adapted into two separate anime television series: a loose anime adaptation with a mostly original story, titled Fullmetal Alchemist, aired from 2003 to 2004, and the second adaptation, which faithfully adapts the original story of the manga, titled Fullmetal Alchemist: Brotherhood, aired from 2009 to 2010.

=== Theatrical films ===
==== Animated ====
Two feature-length anime films were produced; Fullmetal Alchemist the Movie: Conqueror of Shamballa, a sequel and conclusion to the 2003 series, and Fullmetal Alchemist: The Sacred Star of Milos, featuring an original story set during the time period of Brotherhood.

==== Live-action ====
A live-action film based on the manga, Fullmetal Alchemist, was released on November 19, 2017. Directed by Fumihiko Sori, the film stars Ryosuke Yamada as Edward Elric, Tsubasa Honda as Winry Rockbell and Dean Fujioka as Roy Mustang.

The sequels Fullmetal Alchemist: The Revenge of Scar (鋼の錬金術師 完結編 復讐者スカー, Hagane no Renkinjutsushi Kanketsu-hen Fukushūsha Sukā) and Fullmetal Alchemist: The Last Transmutation (鋼の錬金術師 完結編 最後の錬成, Hagane no Renkinjutsushi Kanketsu-hen Saigo no Rensei) were released on May 20 and June 24, 2022, respectively. They became available on Netflix on August 20 and September 24, 2022, respectively.

=== Light novels ===
Square Enix has published a series of six Fullmetal Alchemist Japanese light novels, written by Makoto Inoue and illustrations—including covers and frontispieces—by Arakawa. The novels were licensed for an English-language release by Viz Media in North America, with translations of the first five by Alexander O. Smith. The novels are spin-offs of the manga series and follow the Elric brothers on their continued quest for the philosopher's stone. The first novel, Fullmetal Alchemist: The Land of Sand, was animated as episodes 11, 12 and part of 37 of the original anime series. The fourth novel contains an extra story about the military called "Roy's Holiday". Novelizations of the PlayStation 2 games Fullmetal Alchemist and the Broken Angel, Curse of the Crimson Elixir, and The Girl Who Succeeds God have also been written, the first by Makoto Inoue and the rest by Jun Eishima. Two Wii games, Prince of the Dawn and Daughter of the Dusk, were also novelized in one volume by Sōji Machida.

=== Audio dramas ===
There have been two series of Fullmetal Alchemist audio dramas. The first volume of the first series, Fullmetal Alchemist Vol. 1: The Land of Sand (砂礫の大地, Sareki no Daichi), was released before the anime and tells a similar story to the first novel. The Tringham brothers reprised their anime roles. Fullmetal Alchemist Vol. 2: False Light, Truth's Shadow (偽りの光 真実の影, Itsuwari no Hikari, Shinjitsu no Kage) and Fullmetal Alchemist Vol. 3: Criminals' Scar (咎人たちの傷跡, Togabitotachi no Kizuato) are stories based on different manga chapters; their State Military characters are different from those in the anime. The second series of audio dramas, available only with purchases of Shōnen Gangan, consists of two stories in this series, each with two parts. The first, Fullmetal Alchemist: Ogutāre of the Fog (霧のオグターレ, Kiri no Ogutāre), was included in Shōnen Gangan's April and May 2004 issues; the second story, Fullmetal Alchemist: Crown of Heaven (天上の宝冠, Tenjō no Hōkan), was issued in the November and December 2004 issues.

=== Video games ===
Video games based on Fullmetal Alchemist have been released. The storylines of the games often diverge from those of the anime and manga, and feature original characters. Square Enix has released three role-playing games (RPG)—Fullmetal Alchemist and the Broken Angel, Curse of the Crimson Elixir, and Kami o Tsugu Shōjo. Bandai has released two RPG titles, Fullmetal Alchemist: Stray Rondo (鋼の錬金術師 迷走の輪舞曲, Hagane no Renkinjutsushi Meisō no Rondo) and Fullmetal Alchemist: Sonata of Memory (鋼の錬金術師 想い出の奏鳴曲, Hagane no Renkinjutsushi Omoide no Sonata), for the Game Boy Advance on March 25 and July 22, 2004, respectively, and one, Dual Sympathy, for the Nintendo DS. They also released an action game, Fullmetal Alchemist: Brotherhood (鋼の錬金術師 背中を託せし者, Hagane no Renkinjutsushi: Senaka o Takuseshimono; lit. Fullmetal Alchemist: The Person Entrusted with his Back) for the PlayStation Portable in Japan on October 15, 2009, and in Australia and Europe on June 17 and July 1, 2010, respectively. In Japan, Bandai released an RPG Fullmetal Alchemist: To the Promised Day (鋼の錬金術師 Fullmetal Alchemist 約束の日へ, Hagane no Renkinjutsushi Fullmetal Alchemist Yakusoku no Hi e) for the PlayStation Portable on May 20, 2010. Bandai also released a fighting game, Dream Carnival, for the PlayStation 2. For the Wii, Akatsuki no Ōji (暁の王子, lit. Fullmetal Alchemist: Prince of the Dawn) was released in Japan on August 13, 2009. A direct sequel of the game, Tasogare no Shōjo (黄昏の少女, lit. Fullmetal Alchemist: Daughter of the Dusk), was released by Square Enix on December 10, 2009, for the same console. For the 20th Anniversary of the series, Square Enix released Fullmetal Alchemist Mobile for iOS and Android devices on August 4, 2022; the game ended service on March 29, 2024. Of the twelve games made in Japan, Broken Angel, Curse of the Crimson Elixir, Dual Sympathy, and Fullmetal Alchemist: Brotherhood have seen international releases.

Arakawa oversaw the story and designed the characters for the RPG games, while Bones—the studio responsible for the anime series—produced several animation sequences. The developers looked at other titles—specifically Square Enix's action role-playing game Kingdom Hearts and other games based on manga series, such as Dragon Ball, Naruto or One Piece games—for inspiration. The biggest challenge was to make a "full-fledged" game rather than a simple character-based one. Tomoya Asano, the assistant producer for the games, said that development took more than a year, unlike most character-based games.

Funimation licensed the franchise to create a new series of Fullmetal Alchemist-related video games to be published by Destineer in the United States. Destineer released its first Fullmetal Alchemist game for the Nintendo DS, a translation of Bandai's Dual Sympathy, on December 15, 2006, and said that they plan to release further titles. On February 19, 2007, Destineer announced the second game in its Fullmetal Alchemist series, Fullmetal Alchemist: Trading Card Game, based on the trading card game of the series, which was released on October 15 of that same year for the Nintendo DS, in North America only.

The 2D side-scrolling MMO video game MapleStory received special in-game items based on Fullmetal Alchemist: Brotherhood in 2010.

=== Art and guidebooks ===
Fullmetal Alchemist has received several artbooks. Three artbooks called The Art of Fullmetal Alchemist (イラスト集 FULLMETAL ALCHEMIST, Irasuto Shū Fullmetal Alchemist) were released by Square Enix; two of them were released in the US by Viz Media. The first artbook contains illustrations made between May 2001 to April 2003, spanning the first six manga volumes, while the second has illustrations from September 2003 to October 2005, spanning the next six volumes. The last one includes illustrations from the remaining volumes.

The manga also has three guidebooks; each of them contains timelines, guides to the Elric brothers' journey, and gaiden chapters that were never released in manga volumes. Only the first guidebook was released by Viz Media, titled Fullmetal Alchemist Profiles. A guidebook titled Fullmetal Alchemist Chronicle (鋼の錬金術師 CHRONICLE), which contains post-manga story information, was released in Japan on July 29, 2011.

=== Merchandise ===
Action figures, busts, and statues from the Fullmetal Alchemist anime and manga have been produced by toy companies, including Medicom and Southern Island. Medicom has created high end deluxe vinyl figures of the characters from the anime, which were exclusively distributed in the United States and UK by Southern Island. Southern Island released its own action figures of the main characters in 2007, and a 12" statuette was scheduled for release the same year. Southern Island has since gone bankrupt, and the statuette was not released. A trading card game was first published in 2005 in the United States by Joyride Entertainment. Six expansions were released before the card game was withdrawn on July 11, 2007. Destineer released a Nintendo DS adaptation of the game on October 15, 2007.

== Reception ==
=== Popularity ===
In a survey from Oricon in 2009, Fullmetal Alchemist ranked ninth among the manga that fans wanted to see adapted into live-action films. The series is also popular with amateur writers who produce doujinshi (fan fiction) that borrows characters from the series. In the Japanese market Super Comic City, there have been over 1,100 doujinshi based on Fullmetal Alchemist. Anime News Network said the series had the same impact at Comiket 2004, as several female fans were seen there writing doujinshi. On TV Asahi's Manga Sōsenkyo 2021 poll, in which 150,000 people voted for their top 100 manga series, Fullmetal Alchemist ranked ninth.

=== Sales ===
The series has become one of Square Enix's best-selling properties, along with Final Fantasy and Dragon Quest. By the time the final volume was released, the manga had sold over 50 million copies in Japan. By January 10, 2010, every volume of the manga had sold over a million copies each in the country. Square Enix reported that the series had sold 70.3 million copies worldwide by April 25, 2018, with 16.4 million of those being outside Japan. By July 2021, the manga had 80 million copies in circulation worldwide. By July 2026, it had sold over 90 million copies worldwide. The series is also one of Viz Media's best sellers, appearing in "BookScan's Top 20 Graphic Novels" list and the "USA Today Booklist". It was featured in the Diamond Comic Distributors' polls of graphic novels and The New York Times Best Seller Manga list. The English release of the manga's first volume was the top-selling graphic novel of 2005.

In 2008, volumes 19 and 20 sold over a million copies, ranking as the tenth and eleventh best-selling manga volumes in Japan respectively. In the first half of 2009, it ranked as the seventh best-seller in Japan, having sold over 3 million copies. Volume 21 ranked fourth, with more than a million copies sold and volume 22 ranked sixth with a similar number of sold copies. Producer Kouji Taguchi of Square Enix said that the initial sales of the first volume were 150,000 copies; this grew to 1.5 million copies after the original anime aired. Prior to Brotherhood's premiere, each volume sold about 1.9 million copies, then increasing to 2.1 million copies.

=== Critical response ===
Fullmetal Alchemist has been met with widespread acclaim from both critics and audiences. Though the first volumes were thought to be formulaic, critics have said that the series grows in complexity as it progresses. Jason Thompson named Arakawa one of the best at creating action scenes and praised the series for having great female characters despite being a boys'-targeted manga. He also noted how the story becomes dark by incorporating real-world issues such as government corruption, war and genocide. Thompson finished by stating that Fullmetal Alchemist "will be remembered as one of the classic shonen manga series of the 2000s." Melissa Harper of Anime News Network praised Arakawa for keeping all of her character designs unique and distinguishable, despite many of them wearing the same basic uniforms. IGN's Hilary Goldstein wrote that the characterization of Edward balances between being a "typical clever kid" and a "stubborn kid", allowing him to float between the comical moments and the underlying drama without seeming false. Holly Ellingwood of Active Anime praised the development of the characters in the manga and their beliefs changing during the story, forcing them to mature. Mania Entertainment's Jarred Pine said that the manga can be enjoyed by anybody who has watched the original anime, despite the similarities in the first chapters. Like other reviewers, Pine praised the dark mood of the series and the way it balanced humor and action scenes. Pine also praised the development of characters who have few appearances in the original anime. In a review of the fourteenth volume, Sakura Eries—also of Mania Entertainment—liked the revelations, despite the need to resolve several story arcs. She also praised the development of the homunculi, such as the return of Greed, as well as their fights.

=== Awards and accolades ===
Fullmetal Alchemist was one of the Manga Division's Jury Recommended Works at the 8th and 11th installments of the Japan Media Arts Festival in 2004 and 2007, respectively. Along with Yakitate!! Japan, the series won the 49th Shogakukan Manga Award for the shōnen category in 2004. It won Eagle Award's public poll for "Favourite Manga" in 2010 and 2011. The series won the "Shonen Tournament 2009" by the editorial staff of the French website Manga News. It was nominated for the 10th Sense of Gender Award's Grand Prize in 2010. It also received the 42nd Seiun Award for best science fiction comic in 2011. The series earned Arakawa the New Artist Prize at the fifteenth Tezuka Osamu Cultural Prize in 2011. Fullmetal Alchemist ranked third on the first annual Tsutaya Comic Awards' All-Time Best Section in 2017.

== See also ==
- List of Square Enix manga franchises
- List of Square Enix video game franchises
