= Fullmetal Alchemist and the Broken Angel =

2003 video game

- North American cover art
- Developer: Racjin
- Publisher: Square Enix
- Designers: Tomoya Asano (assistant producer); Hiromu Arakawa (story supervisor, character designer)
- Series: Fullmetal Alchemist
- Platform: PlayStation 2
- Release: JP: December 25, 2003; NA: January 18, 2005
- Genre: Action role-playing
- Mode: Single-player

Fullmetal Alchemist and the Broken Angel (鋼の錬金術師 翔べない天使, Hagane no Renkinjutsushi: Tobenai Tenshi; Alchemist of Steel: The Flightless Angel in Japan) is an action role-playing game developed by Racjin and published by Square Enix for the PlayStation 2 console. The game features an original story by Hiromu Arakawa, the creator of the Fullmetal Alchemist manga. It is based on the Fullmetal Alchemist manga series, also published by Square Enix. The game was released in Japan on December 25, 2003, and in North America on January 18, 2005.

The game follows the protagonists of the series, alchemist brothers Edward and Alphonse Elric, as they explore lands full of giant creatures known as chimeras as well as thieves. Once meeting a girl named Armony, the two brothers start learning where the chimeras come from. The player primarily controls Edward, an alchemist who can transform objects from the game's stages into weapons to defeat his enemies. Additionally, he can receive support by Alphonse's AI in order to fight multiple enemies.

Despite good sales in Japan, critical reception to the game has been largely mixed. Critics have been divided on the game's graphics and gameplay. However, the story has also received praise for the cast's characterization while other reviewers found it easy to predict the twists and outcomes.

== Gameplay ==
Gameplay of Broken Angel featuring both Alphonse (left) and Edward (right) using transmuted weapons to fight the enemy chimera

Broken Angel is an action role-playing game, which is similar to that of a 3D beat-em-up. The player takes control of Edward Elric. Besides using his metallic arm as a sword, he is also able to transmute weapons to enhance attack power. Thanks to this, he can attack enemies he cannot reach and utilize defense. Players are able to equip Ed and Al with various accessories that can either enhance or hinder their performance. Alphonse is computer-controlled, though the player can summon him to aid Edward by pressing and holding the R1 button. Alphonse can also be given weapons by Edward in order to enhance them. When Alphonse's health is depleted, Edward can restore him by using alchemy on his armor. However, once Edward loses all his health, the game is over.

The game also carries RPG elements such as leveling up by winning enough experience when defeating enemies. Enemies' attacks can also affect the player's commands with items he picks up across the stages and activate them while opening the menu.

== Plot ==
On their way to Central, the Elric brothers Edward and Alphonse, who are being escorted by Major Alex Louis Armstrong, end up in the town of Heissgart when their train is attacked by terrorists claiming to be from the Amestrian military. The Elrics are separated from Armstrong while exploring the Chimera-infested town, meeting a young girl named Armony Eiselstein (アルモニ・エイゼルシュタイン, Arumoni Eizerushutain) who is not attacked by Chimeras. Edward decides to chase after she calls him "shorty". They eventually find her in New Heissgart when they save her from thieves and she requests that they teach her alchemy.

The Elrics meet Armony's father Professor Wilhelm Eiselstein (ヴィルヘルム・エイゼルシュタイン教授, Viruherumu Eizerushutain Kyōju), a famous alchemist and authority on catalytics – the study of making efficient alchemy – who was researching the "Philosopher's Catalyst", a legendary material similar to the Philosopher's Stone that can enhance the potency of alchemic transmutations. Wilhelm oversaw the construction of New Hiessgart following the military and chimera occupation. When Wilhelm requests the Elrics to bring them Etherflowers, they are accompanied by Armony who eventually convinces the brothers to act against her father's wishes and reluctantly teach her alchemy. But she suddenly falls ill while two small wings appear in her back. Later, it is revealed that Armony is the result of Wilheim's daughter Selene being fused with the catalyst, creating an alternate identity with memories of believing herself a separate person from Selene. The catalyst in her body, presented by her wings, prevents Armony from safely using alchemy while keeping her from being attacked by the rampant Chimeras.

Wilheim's assistant Greta Riddle reveals her true identity as Camilla (カミラ, Kamira), a rogue alchemist who sought the Philosopher's Catalyst to become immortal while she and Wilheim won over the compliance of the Hiessgart region's overseer Brigadier General Mudi Nemda with weaponized Chimeras for his agenda of establishing his own country. Camilla abducts Armony to take the catalyst while having Nemda's forces attack the Elrics and Wilheim. But Camilla ends up falling to her apparent death when she attempts to the kill the Elric brothers after Wilheim sabotages her scheme with an Etherflower, which damages the catalyst with Armony mortally injured as a result. In the end, as Colonel Roy Mustang and Armstrong keep the Elrics from interfering, Wilheim sacrifices himself to completely destroy the catalyst and end Armony's suffering. Mustang's group arrest Nemda for court-martial while the Elrics resume their return to Central alongside Armstrong while reading Armony's letter to them.

== Development ==
Fullmetal Alchemist and the Broken Angel was developed by the Japanese company Racjin and initially produced by Enix, before their merger with Square in April 2003. Development for the game began before that of the Fullmetal Alchemist anime series. Hiromu Arakawa, the author of the original manga, oversaw the story of the game and designed its characters, while Bones, the studio which would be responsible for the anime series, produced 30 minutes of animation. Themes emphasized during the creation of the game include the bond between Alphonse and Edward, as well as the series' basic concept of Equivalent Exchange, which states that "man cannot gain without sacrifice". The developers looked at other titles for inspiration, particularly Square's action role-playing game Kingdom Hearts, in addition to other games based on manga series, such as Dragon Ball, Naruto or One Piece games. The biggest challenge they had to overcome was to try to make the title a "full-fledged" game rather than a simple "character-based" game. Tomoya Asano, the assistant producer for the game, noted that development spanned more than a year, unlike most character-based games.

In Japan, the game was showcased at the Tokyo Game Show in September 2003, the first time that Square and Enix had appeared at the show as a single company. In the United States, the game was showcased at the Electronic Entertainment Expo of Los Angeles in May 2004, with the presence of Asano. For the North American version of the game, the developers made the difficulty level more challenging and aggressive. A novelization of the game was also written by Makoto Inoue on July 30, 2004, with Arakawa providing illustrations.

Since Square Enix wanted the game to be released during the show's broadcast on Adult Swim, Funimation had to begin casting, and recording (at Okatron 5000 under director Chris Sabat) for the English dub for the game long before they were set to record a single episode for the show.

== Audio ==
Fullmetal Alchemist and the Broken Angel Game Original Soundtrack

Soundtrack album
- Released: February 18, 2004
- Genre: Video game music
- Length: 60:43
- Label: Aniplex

The score for the game was composed by Makoto Suehiro, Isao Kasai, Kenji Tani, and Tomohiko Sato. It includes three vocal songs: "Flowers of the Hearts" sung by voice actress Motoko Kumai, "Emotionally" sung by Saori Yamada, and a remix of the first TV ending theme song, "Kesenai Tsumi" (Inerasable Sin) sung by J-pop singer Nana Kitade entitled "Kesenai Tsumi~raw"breath"track~". The soundtrack was published in Japan as a copy-protected album by Aniplex, a subsidiary of Sony Music Entertainment, on February 18, 2004.

Tracklist
No.	Title	Writer(s)	Length
1.	"Running"	Tomohiko Sato	2:05
2.	"The Intersection of Fate"	Makoto Suehiro	1:54
3.	"Tears of an Angel"	Makoto Suehiro	1:21
4.	"A Young Girl's Memories"	Makoto Suehiro	1:05
5.	"Flowers of the Heart" (sung by Motoko Kumai)	Tomohiko Sato	1:32
6.	"Rest for an Angel"	Makoto Suehiro	1:43
7.	"A Clear Evening in the Wilderness"	Makoto Suehiro	1:10
8.	"Eyes of Corruption"	Makoto Suehiro	3:11
9.	"Prayers of the Saint"	Makoto Suehiro	2:13
10.	"Bottega"	Isao Kasai	2:01
11.	"Black Conspiracy"	Kenji Tani	1:22
12.	"Crowd Round"	Isao Kasai	1:05
13.	"Excess"	Isao Kasai	2:20
14.	"National Alchemist"	Kenji Tani	1:28
15.	"Crisis Game"	Isao Kasai	1:37
16.	"Rush 1"	Kenji Tani	2:46
17.	"Rush 2"	Kenji Tani	2:52
18.	"Fight It Out!"	Makoto Suehiro	1:14
19.	"Go Ahead Rapidly"	Isao Kasai	1:05
20.	"Pizza Time"	Kenji Tani	2:18
21.	"Armor Piercing Alchemist"	Makoto Suehiro	3:05
22.	"Cold Breath!!!"	Makoto Suehiro	4:21
23.	"Wax-a-Mule"	Isao Kasai	2:12
24.	"Go!!"	Kenji Tani	2:27
25.	"K.M.E < RA"	Kenji Tani	4:09
26.	"Killer Moon"	Kenji Tani	2:54
27.	"Biter"	Isao Kasai	1:18
28.	"Moving Squall"	Makoto Suehiro	1:55
29.	"Cutting Edge"	Tomohiko Sato	1:57
30.	"To My Small, Yet Great Teacher"	Makoto Suehiro	4:04
31.	"Emotionally" (sung by Saori Yamada)	Isao Kasai, Makoto Suehiro	4:51
32.	"Indelible Sin" ("Raw 'Breath' Track", sung by Nana Kitade)	Uncredited	1:20

== Reception ==
Reception

Aggregate score
Aggregator	Score
Metacritic	56 out of 100

Review scores
Publication	Score
GameRevolution	D−
GameSpy	2.5/5
GameZone	7.1 out of 10
IGN	6.4 out of 10
RPGamer	3/5
RPGFan	68%

The game was popular in Japan. It sold 250,000 copies as of 2004. However, critical reception has been mostly mixed with the game having an average of 56 out of 100 in Metacritic. IGN negatively compared it with Square's 2002 video game Kingdom Hearts noting the similarities in which in both games the playable character is assisted by AI though The Broken Angel's felt inferior. Despite also citing as a short game, the reviewer praised the story. Darryl Vassar from GameSpy agreed with IGN's review but found Edward's alchemy "fun" due to how the player can interact with the levels' objects. However, he criticized the game's graphics.

GameRevolution's Joe Dodson was far more negative, stating the plot is sometimes "lame" due to the reasons the main characters are in chase of Armory. He also found the enemy AIs poor based on how can easily the players can avoid them. RPGFan's Neal Chandran found the story as "told a bazillion times, with plot twists a child could see coming a mile away." Nevertheless, Chandran enjoyed the dynamic between the main characters both in fights as well as dialogues. When discussing the game's elements, Chandran criticized its linearity and the reuse of old dungeons. RPGamer's Joel Pan shared similar feelings with IGN in regards to the game's similarities with Kingdom Hearts but more positive as Alphonse's AI will come to the player's aid when necessary. While also finding the alchemy entertaining, RPGamer noticed the player needed to go into a menu to use items which ruined the game's fast-pace combat. GameZone reviewer called it "an alright game", finding it appealing to fans of the Fullmetal Alchemist series. However, like other reviewer writers he felt the graphics underwhelming.
