= Alphonse Elric =

Character in Fullmetal Alchemist

- Fullmetal Alchemist character
- Alphonse Elric by Hiromu Arakawa
- First appearance: Fullmetal Alchemist chapter 1, "The Two Alchemists" (2001)
- Voiced by: Japanese; Rie Kugimiya (anime); Atomu Mizuishi (film; Original); Seiru (film; Young); English; Aaron Dismuke (2003 series); Maxey Whitehead (Brotherhood)

In-universe information
- Relatives: Edward Elric (older brother); Van Hohenheim (father, deceased); Trisha Elric (mother, deceased); Winry Rockbell (sister-in-law); Envy (half-brother; deceased) (first anime only); Unnamed nephew and niece

Alphonse Elric (Japanese: アルフォンス・エルリック, Hepburn: Arufonsu Erurikku) is a fictional character of the Fullmetal Alchemist manga series and its adaptations created by Hiromu Arakawa. Alphonse is a child who lost his body during an alchemical experiment to bring his deceased mother back to life and had his soul attached to a suit of armor by his older brother Edward. As a result, Alphonse is almost invulnerable as long as the armor's seal is not erased, but is unable to feel anything. To recover their bodies, the Elrics travel around their country Amestris to obtain the Philosopher's Stone—an alchemical object that could restore them. In the animated adaptations of Fullmetal Alchemist, Alphonse is voiced by Rie Kugimiya in Japanese. In the English adaptations, he is voiced by Aaron Dismuke in the first series and by Maxey Whitehead in the second.

As a result of appearing in the series mostly in his armor, Arakawa has been focused on searching ways to make it appear as Alphonse is expressing emotions despite not having a body. Alphonse has also appeared in materials related to the manga, including video games and light novels that follow his journey. His character has been well received by readers of the series; he has consistently appeared in the top ten series' popularity polls. The character has received positive remarks from critics, with some commending his design and his relationship with Edward.

== Appearances ==
Alphonse's original body. The author Hiromu Arakawa often made sketches of him since he usually appears as an armor.

Alphonse is one of the protagonists from the series alongside his older brother Edward. Alphonse lost his body when he and Edward try to revive their mother Trisha using alchemy. Edward sacrifices his right arm to seal Alphonse's soul into a suit of armor. Edward later becomes an alchemist from the state military of Amestris, and starts traveling with Alphonse to search for a method to recover Alphonse's body. They seek the Philosopher's Stone, which would allow them to restore their physical forms. Besides being a powerful alchemist, Alphonse is a skilled hand-to-hand fighter; having been trained by Izumi Curtis. While Alphonse cannot feel anything because he has no body, he is nearly invincible as long as the blood mark made by Edward on his armor to contain his soul is not defaced.

Believing that the immortal creatures known as the homunculi will lead them to more clues to recover their bodies, the Elrics try to use them. However, they meet the homunculi's creator "Father", who secretly controls the military and blackmails the Elrics into working under him. Seeking to protect their friends, the Elrics travel to the northern area of the country in order to request help from General Olivier Mira Armstrong. After the two are successful in their plan, Alphonse's original body tries to recover the soul resulting in him losing consciousness several times. Separated from his brother to assist his friends' escape from the military men serving Father, Alphonse is captured by the homunculus Pride to use him against Edward. Joining forces with his father Van Hohenheim, Alphonse traps Pride and himself within a cave where the homunculus remains powerless. State Alchemist Solf J. Kimblee later comes to Pride's aid, and Alphonse is rescued by some of his comrades.

Seeking to transmute the whole country, Father transports the Elrics to his base to use them as two of the five sacrifices required to achieve his goal. At the same moment, Alphonse finds his original body, but refuses to recover it because its weakened state would not help them to fight the homunculi. In the final fight against Father, Alphonse requests help from the alchemist May Chang to return Edward's right arm in exchange for Alphonse's soul. As Edward, with his restored arm, fights Father, Alphonse's soul disappears from the armor. Following Father's defeat, Edward sacrifices his ability to use alchemy to restore Alphonse's soul and original body. The two return to Resembool, where they live until they decide to separate to study alchemy. Alphonse joins with two chimera comrades and they travel to the country of Xing to learn more alchemy with May's help.

=== In the first anime ===
The first half of the anime's plot follows that of the manga, but the plots severely diverge from each other near the middle of the story. After Kimblee uses alchemy to transform Alphonse's armor into explosive material, Scar transfers all of his incomplete Philosopher's Stone into Al to save his life. As a result, Alphonse's armor becomes the Philosopher's Stone. Because he houses the Stone in his body, he becomes the primary target of the homunculi's leader Dante, who is trying to cheat death. Once captured by the homunculi for Dante, Al is to be eaten by Gluttony to complete the Stone inside Gluttony's body. But when he sees his brother killed trying to save him, Al uses the stone's power to heal Edward's body and re-bind his soul to it. This destroys Alphonse's own body as he uses up the whole of the Philosopher's Stone in the transmutations. Then Edward, using his own body, resurrects Alphonse. As a result, Edward disappears and Alphonse continues studying alchemy to find him.

In the film sequel Fullmetal Alchemist the Movie: Conqueror of Shamballa, Alphonse continues searching for his brother until learning that he is in a parallel world. With help from the homunculus Wrath, Alphonse opens the gate to the parallel world, but at the same time causes a soldier named Dietline Eckhart, who is from the parallel world, to start attacking Amestris. Joining forces with Edward, Alphonse defeats Eckhart and decides to stay with his brother to live in the parallel world.

=== In other media ===
Aside from the initial anime and manga, Alphonse appears in almost all the Fullmetal Alchemist original video animations (OVAs). In the first one, he appears as a chibi version of himself at the movie's wrap-up party, and in the fourth OVA, he plays a part in the battle against the homunculi. Alphonse also appears in all Fullmetal Alchemist video games on all platforms, which feature his and Ed's journey to find the Philosopher's Stone. In the film The Sacred Star of Milos Alphonse goes with his brother to search for the criminal Melvin Voyager who broke free from a prison in their country. Makoto Inoue's Fullmetal Alchemist light novels also feature the Elrics' journey, but in all of them they encounter different characters to those from the video games. Two character CDs with tracks based on Alphonse were released under the name of Hagaren Song File – Alphonse Elric (Hagaren Song File - アルフォンス・エルリック) and Theme of Alphonse Elric. The tracks from the CD are performed by Alphone's Japanese voice actress, Rie Kugimiya. He is also featured in several of the Fullmetal Alchemist Trading Card Games.

== Creation and conception ==
In a prototype from the series, Alphonse's soul was sealed in a flying squirrel instead of armor as a result of human transmutation. He appeared as the brother to the other protagonist, Edward, in their searching for a way to recover their bodies. To match the designs from the manga magazine Monthly Shōnen Gangan, the two characters were redesigned. Alphonse was given a huge suit of armor to contrast him with Edward's short stature. Since Alphonse mostly appears with his armor, Arakawa tends to make sketches of his human form so that she would not forget how to draw him. Some events from the Elrics' lives are social problems she integrated into the plot. Their journey across the country to help people is meant to gain an understanding of the meaning of family. As Alphonse is mostly seen with his armor, during various chapters from the manga Arakawa was unable to draw him crying. During Chapter 40, Arakawa saw his conversation with Edward as a way to let him express his feeling and to make him appear as though he is crying. When comparing the two brothers during the time Alphonse obtained the ability to use alchemy without a circle like Edward, Arakawa stated nobody was better at alchemy as the two had different preferences in the same way as other alchemists appearing in the series. When making omakes, Arakawa tends to draw Alphonse doing something comical to contrast him with the other characters. She states that she does it because Alphonse may enjoy making fun of other people.

In the Japanese animated adaptations of Fullmetal Alchemist, Alphonse was voiced by Rie Kugimiya. For the English version, Aaron Dismuke took the role for the first anime, Conqueror of Shamballa and some of the OVAs. He has found Alphonse to be his favorite character, and likes the way he "sticks up for people". He also said that he tries to be like Alphonse when voicing him, though he added, "I don't really see a lot of myself in him". In Fullmetal Alchemist: Brotherhood, Dismuke was replaced by Maxey Whitehead, as Dismuke's voice had changed with age. For the live-action film, Alphonse's armor was made in CGI. Arakawa herself expressed surprise when seeing the final product.

== Reception ==
In popularity polls from the manga made by Monthly Shōnen Gangan, Alphonse was initially ranked in the third place, while later polls placed him fourth. He has also been highly ranked in the Animage's Anime Grand Prix polls in the category of best male characters in both 2004. Merchandise based on Alphonse's appearance, including figurines, keychains and plush toys, has been marketed. UGO Networks listed one of his statues tenth in their article of "Insanely Expensive Comic Book Collectibles We'd Blow Our Wad On."

Several publications for manga, anime, and other pop culture media have both praised and criticized Alphonse's character. Chis Beveridge from Mania Entertainment has praised Alphonse for being "quite the likeable character" and liked his role in the first series. The character's madness and disbelief over his own existence has been praised; Beveridge said it "could make up a series all by itself." In a later volume review, Beveridge said the series' change of focus to Alphonse "as an actual young boy" was "a nice change of pace." T.H.E.M. Anime Reviews' Samuel Arbogast wrote that the interaction between the Elric brothers as they travel is interesting and that Alphonse's armor was of the most notable characters designs from the series. The brothers were also noted to "becoming men" by Active's Anime Holly Ellingwood after the first appearance of Van Hohenheim in the manga as the two investigate ways to recover their bodies. Lydia Hojnacki said Alphonse's character is as important as his brother to the series after commenting on Edward as she considered Alphonse to be Edward's yang.

Rebecca Silverman from Anime News Network praised Alphonse's development in the manga, especially where he refuses to recover his weakened body and instead helps his friends. As a result, Silverman brought a comparison between the two brothers and wondered whether Edward would have done the same. Chris Beveridge found the character's growth in Conqueror in Shamballa appealing as he starts visually resembling Edward. When reviewing the video game Fullmetal Alchemist and the Broken Angel, RPGFan's Neal Chandran enjoyed the dynamic between the main characters both in fights as well as dialogues. After Aaron Dismuke's voice matured, Anime News Network writer Justin Sevakis criticized him for his part in the Fullmetal Alchemist: Premium OVA Collection, writing that "he simply no longer sounds like Alphonse".
