= List of Code Geass episodes =

Code Geass (Japanese: コードギアス, Hepburn: Kōdo Giasu) is a Japanese anime series produced by Sunrise, Mainichi Broadcasting System, and Project Geass. The first season, entitled Code Geass: Lelouch of the Rebellion (コードギアス 反逆のルルーシュ, Kōdo Giasu: Hangyaku no Rurūshu), premiered on Mainichi Broadcasting System on October 6, 2006, and was broadcast by a total of ten stations. Its final two episodes were aired on July 29, 2007. It was followed by Code Geass: Lelouch of the Rebellion R2 (コードギアス 反逆のルルーシュ R2, Kōdo Giasu: Hangyaku no Rurūshu R2) which aired on April 6, 2008, and was broadcast on sixteen stations. Its final episode aired on September 28, 2008.

Since its premiere in Japan, Lelouch of the Rebellion and R2 were licensed by Bandai Entertainment and dubbed by ZRO Limit Productions. Lelouch of the Rebellion premiered on Adult Swim on April 27, 2008, and R2 on November 2, 2008. The two seasons were then distributed by Beez Entertainment and Kazé in the United Kingdom and licensed by Madman Entertainment in Australia. Both seasons have also received localizations in other languages such as French, German, Italian, and Tagalog.

Following Lelouch of the Rebellion and R2 were four individual original video animations (OVA), and an OVA series titled Code Geass: Akito the Exiled (コードギアス 亡国のアキト, Kōdo Giasu: Bōkoku no Akito).

== Series overview ==
Season	Episodes	Originally released	
Season	Episodes	First released	Last released
1	25	October 6, 2006	July 29, 2007
2	25	April 6, 2008	September 28, 2008

== Episode list ==
=== Season 1: Lelouch of the Rebellion (2006–07) ===
No. overall	No. in season	Title	Storyboarded by	Directed by	Written by	Original release date	English air date	Ref.
1	1	"The Day a New Demon was Born"; Transliteration: "Majin ga Umareta Hi" (Japanese: 魔神が生まれた日)	Gorō Taniguchi	Noriaki Akitaya	Ichirō Ōkouchi	October 6, 2006	April 27, 2008	
2	2	"The White Knight Awakens"; Transliteration: "Kakusei no Shiroki Kishi" (Japanese: 覚醒の白き騎士)	Tsukasa Sunaga	Masato Miyoshi	Ichirō Ōkouchi	October 13, 2006	May 4, 2008	
3	3	"The False Classmate"; Transliteration: "Itsuwari no Kurasumeito" (Japanese: 偽りのクラスメイト)	Kazuya Murata	Kazuya Murata	Ichirō Ōkouchi	October 20, 2006	May 11, 2008	
4	4	"His Name is Zero"; Transliteration: "Sono Na wa Zero" (Japanese: その名はゼロ)	Tsukasa Sunaga	Kazuo Miyake	Ichirō Ōkouchi	October 27, 2006	May 18, 2008	
5	5	"The Princess and the Witch"; Transliteration: "Kōjo to Majo" (Japanese: 皇女と魔女)	Tsukasa Sunaga	Akira Toba	Ichirō Ōkouchi	November 3, 2006	May 25, 2008	
6	6	"The Stolen Mask"; Transliteration: "Ubawareta Kamen" (Japanese: 奪われた仮面)	Kazuya Murata	Hiroaki Kudō	Ichirō Ōkouchi	November 10, 2006	June 1, 2008	
7	7	"Attack Cornelia"; Transliteration: "Kōneria o Ute" (Japanese: コーネリアを撃て)	Tsukasa Sunaga	Noriaki Akitaya	Ichirō Ōkouchi	November 17, 2006	June 8, 2008	
8	8	"The Black Knights"; Transliteration: "Kuro no Kishidan" (Japanese: 黒の騎士団)	Tsukasa Sunaga	Makoto Baba	Ichirō Ōkouchi	November 24, 2006	June 15, 2008	
9	9	"Refrain"; Transliteration: "Rifurein" (Japanese: リフレイン)	Kazuya Murata	Kazuya Murata	Ichirō Ōkouchi	December 8, 2006	June 22, 2008	
10	10	"Guren Dances"; Transliteration: "Guren Mau" (Japanese: 紅蓮舞う)	Tsukasa Sunaga	Kazuo Miyake	Ichirō Ōkouchi	December 15, 2006	June 29, 2008	
11	11	"Battle for Narita"; Transliteration: "Narita Kōbōsen" (Japanese: ナリタ攻防戦)	Tsukasa Sunaga	Akira Toba	Ichirō Ōkouchi	December 22, 2006	July 6, 2008	
12	12	"The Messenger from Kyoto"; Transliteration: "Kyōto kara no Shisha" (Japanese: キョウトからの使者)	Gō Sakamoto	Hiroaki Kudō	Hiroyuki Yoshino	January 5, 2007	July 13, 2008	
13	13	"Shirley at Gunpoint"; Transliteration: "Shārī to Jūkō" (Japanese: シャーリーと銃口)	Yō Shinkai	Noriaki Akitaya	Hiroyuki Yoshino	January 12, 2007	July 20, 2008	
14	14	"Geass vs. Geass"; Transliteration: "Giasu tai Giasu" (Japanese: ギアス対ギアス)	Kunihisa Sugishima	Makoto Baba	Ichirō Ōkouchi	January 19, 2007	July 27, 2008	
15	15	"Cheering Mao"; Transliteration: "Kassai no Mao" (Japanese: 喝采のマオ)	Tsukasa Sunaga	Tōru Yamada	Ichirō Ōkouchi	January 26, 2007	August 3, 2008	
16	16	"Nunnally Held Hostage"; Transliteration: "Toraware no Nanarī" (Japanese: 囚われのナナリー)	Tsukasa Sunaga	Kazuo Miyake	Ichirō Ōkouchi	February 2, 2007	August 10, 2008	
17	17	"Knight"; Transliteration: "Kishi" (Japanese: 騎士)	Kazuya Murata	Kazuya Murata	Yūichi Nomura	February 9, 2007	August 24, 2008	
18	18	"I Order you, Suzaku Kururugi"; Transliteration: "Kururugi Suzaku ni Meijiru" (Japanese: 枢木スザクに命じる)	Kunihisa Sugishima	Akira Toba	Ichirō Ōkouchi	February 23, 2007	August 31, 2008	
19	19	"Island of the Gods"; Transliteration: "Kami no Shima" (Japanese: 神の島)	Tsukasa Sunaga	Shin'ichi Masaki	Hiroyuki Yoshino	March 2, 2007	September 7, 2008	
20	20	"Battle at Kyushu"; Transliteration: "Kyūshū Sen'eki" (Japanese: キュウシュウ戦役)	Tsukasa Sunaga	Hiroaki Kudō	Yūichi Nomura	March 9, 2007	September 14, 2008	
21	21	"The School Festival Declaration"; Transliteration: "Gakuen-sai Sengen!" (Japanese: 学園祭宣言!)	Kunihisa Sugishima	Noriaki Akitaya	Ichirō Ōkouchi	March 16, 2007	September 21, 2008	
22	22	"Bloodstained Euphy"; Transliteration: "Chizome no Yufi" (Japanese: 血染めのユフィ)	Tsukasa Sunaga	Makoto Baba	Ichirō Ōkouchi	March 23, 2007	October 5, 2008	
23	23	"At Least with Sorrow"; Transliteration: "Semete Kanashimi to Tomo ni" (Japanese: せめて哀しみとともに)	Kunihisa Sugishima	Shin'ichi Masaki	Ichirō Ōkouchi Yūichi Nomura	March 30, 2007	October 12, 2008	
24	24	"The Collapsing Stage"; Transliteration: "Hōraku no Sutēji" (Japanese: 崩落のステージ)	Tsukasa Sunaga	Kazuo Miyake	Ichirō Ōkouchi	July 29, 2007	October 19, 2008	
25	25	"Zero" (Japanese: ゼロ)	Tsukasa Sunaga	Akira Toba	Ichirō Ōkouchi	July 29, 2007	October 26, 2008	

=== Season 2: Lelouch of the Rebellion R2 (2008) ===
No. overall	No. in season	Title	Storyboarded by	Directed by	Written by	Original release date	English air date	Ref.
26	1	"The Day a Demon Awakens"; Transliteration: "Majin ga Mezameru Hi" (Japanese: 魔神が目覚める日)	Tsukasa Sunaga	Noriaki Akitaya	Ichirō Ōkouchi	April 6, 2008	November 2, 2008	
27	2	"Plan for Independent Japan"; Transliteration: "Nippon Dokuritsu Keikaku" (Japanese: 日本独立計画)	Tsukasa Sunaga	Akira Toba	Ichirō Ōkouchi	April 13, 2008	November 16, 2008	
28	3	"Imprisoned in Campus"; Transliteration: "Toraware no Gakuen" (Japanese: 囚われの学園)	Kazuya Murata	Makoto Baba	Ichirō Ōkouchi	April 20, 2008	November 23, 2008	
29	4	"Counterattack at the Gallows"; Transliteration: "Gyakushū no Shokeidai" (Japanese: 逆襲の処刑台)	Kunihisa Sugishima	Kazuo Miyake	Ichirō Ōkouchi	April 27, 2008	November 30, 2008	
30	5	"Knights of the Round"; Transliteration: "Naito obu Raunzu" (Japanese: ナイトオブラウンズ)	Tsukasa Sunaga	Masato Miyoshi Noriaki Akitaya	Ichirō Ōkouchi	May 4, 2008	December 7, 2008	
31	6	"Surprise Attack over the Pacific"; Transliteration: "Taiheiyō Kishū Sakusen" (Japanese: 太平洋奇襲作戦)	Tsukasa Sunaga	Akira Toba	Ichirō Ōkouchi	May 11, 2008	December 14, 2008	
32	7	"The Abandoned Mask"; Transliteration: "Suterareta Kamen" (Japanese: 棄てられた仮面)	Kazuya Murata	Makoto Baba	Ichirō Ōkouchi	May 18, 2008	January 11, 2009	
33	8	"One Million Miracles"; Transliteration: "Hyakuman no Kiseki" (Japanese: 百万のキセキ)	Kunihisa Sugishima	Kazuo Miyake	Ichirō Ōkouchi	May 25, 2008	January 18, 2009	
34	9	"A Bride in the Vermillion Forbidden City"; Transliteration: "Shukinjō no Hanayome" (Japanese: 朱禁城の花嫁)	Tsukasa Sunaga	Kazuo Sakai	Ichirō Ōkouchi	June 8, 2008	January 25, 2009	
35	10	"When Shen Hu Wins Glory"; Transliteration: "Shenfū Kagayaku Toki" (Japanese: 神虎輝く刻)	Tsukasa Sunaga	Akira Toba	Ichirō Ōkouchi	June 15, 2008	February 1, 2009	
36	11	"Power of Passion"; Transliteration: "Omoi no Chikara" (Japanese: 想いの力)	Tsukasa Sunaga	Yū Nobuta	Ichirō Ōkouchi	June 22, 2008	February 8, 2009	
37	12	"Love Attack!"; Transliteration: "Rabu Atakku!" (Japanese: ラブアタック!)	Kunihiro Mori Tsukasa Sunaga	Noriaki Akitaya	Ichirō Ōkouchi	June 29, 2008	February 15, 2009	
38	13	"Assassin from the Past"; Transliteration: "Kako kara no Shikaku" (Japanese: 過去からの刺客)	Kazuya Murata	Kazuhiro Yoneda	Ichirō Ōkouchi	July 6, 2008	February 22, 2009	
39	14	"Geass Hunt"; Transliteration: "Giasu Gari" (Japanese: ギアス狩り)	Tsukasa Sunaga	Kazuo Miyake	Ichirō Ōkouchi	July 13, 2008	March 1, 2009	
40	15	"The C's World"; Transliteration: "Shī no Sekai" (Japanese: Cの世界)	Tsukasa Sunaga	Makoto Baba	Ichirō Ōkouchi	July 20, 2008	March 8, 2009	
41	16	"United Federation of Nations Resolution Number One"; Transliteration: "Chōgasshūkoku Ketsugi Daiichigō" (Japanese: 超合集国決議第壱號)	Tsukasa Sunaga	Tatsuya Abe	Ichirō Ōkouchi	July 27, 2008	May 3, 2009	
42	17	"The Taste of Humiliation"; Transliteration: "Tsuchi no Aji" (Japanese: 土の味)	Masamitsu Hidaka Tamayo Yamamoto	Hiroaki Kudō	Ichirō Ōkouchi	August 3, 2008	May 10, 2009	
43	18	"Final Battle Tokyo II"; Transliteration: "Dainiji Tōkyō Kessen" (Japanese: 第二次東京決戦)	Tsukasa Sunaga	Akira Toba	Ichirō Ōkouchi	August 10, 2008	May 10, 2009	
44	19	"Betrayal"; Transliteration: "Uragiri" (Japanese: 裏切り)	Kazuya Murata	Noriaki Akitaya	Ichirō Ōkouchi	August 17, 2008	May 17, 2009	
45	20	"Emperor Dismissed"; Transliteration: "Kōtei Shikkaku" (Japanese: 皇帝失格)	Tsukasa Sunaga	Kazuo Miyake	Ichirō Ōkouchi	August 24, 2008	May 17, 2009	
46	21	"The Ragnarök Connection"; Transliteration: "Ragunareku no Setsuzoku" (Japanese: ラグナレクの接続)	Tsukasa Sunaga	Makoto Baba	Ichirō Ōkouchi	August 31, 2008	May 24, 2009	
47	22	"Emperor Lelouch"; Transliteration: "Kōtei Rurūshu" (Japanese: 皇帝ルルーシュ)	Kazuya Murata	Yū Nobuta Masato Miyoshi	Ichirō Ōkouchi	September 7, 2008	May 24, 2009	
48	23	"Schneizel's Guise"; Transliteration: "Shunaizeru no Kamen" (Japanese: シュナイゼルの仮面)	Shishō Igarashi (Note: Credited under the pen name "Tatsuya Igarashi" (五十嵐 達矢, Igarashi Tatsuya).)	Shishō Igarashi	Ichirō Ōkouchi	September 14, 2008	May 31, 2009	
49	24	"The Grip of Damocles"; Transliteration: "Damokuresu no Sora" (Japanese: ダモクレスの空)	Tsukasa Sunaga	Akira Toba	Ichirō Ōkouchi	September 21, 2008	May 31, 2009	
50	25	"Re;"	Tsukasa Sunaga Kazuya Murata	Kazuya Murata, (Note: Credited as Directing Supervisor (演出統括, Enshutsu tōkatsu).) Noriaki Akitaya, Kazuo Miyake, Makoto Baba, Fumiya Kitajō	Ichirō Ōkouchi	September 28, 2008	June 7, 2009	

== OVAs ==
No.	Title	Original release date
1	"Code Geass: Lelouch of the Rebellion Special Edition Black Rebellion"; Transliteration: "Kōdo Giasu: Hangyaku no Rurūshu Special Edition Black Rebellion" (Japanese: コードギアス 反逆のルルーシュ Special Edition Black Rebellion)	February 22, 2008
An OVA compilation of Code Geass: Lelouch of the Rebellion.
2	"Code Geass: Lelouch of the Rebellion R2 Special Edition Zero Requiem"; Transliteration: "Kōdo Giasu: Hangyaku no Rurūshu R2 Special Edition Zero Requiem" (Japanese: コードギアス 反逆のルルーシュ R2 Special Edition Zero Requiem)	July 24, 2009
An OVA compilation of Code Geass: Lelouch of the Rebellion R2.
3	"Code Geass: The Miraculous Birthday"; Transliteration: "Kōdo Giasu: Kiseki no Tanjōbi" (Japanese: コードギアス 反逆のルルーシュ キセキの誕生日)	April 23, 2010
Ashford Academy are invaded by the Neo Chinese Federation and are dealt with by Lelouch and his friends. Soon after, Lelouch, C.C., Rolo, and Shirley fade away and the remaining friends regain their memories and deduce the events were a miracle created by Lelouch in the after life.
4	"Code Geass: Lelouch of the Rebellion - Nunnally in Wonderland"; Transliteration: "Kōdo Giasu: Hangyaku no Rurūshu - Nanarī in Wandārando" (Japanese: コードギアス 反逆のルルーシュ： ナナリーinワンダーランド)	July 27, 2012
Lelouch, wishing to make Nunnally happy, casts her as Alice in Alice's Adventures in Wonderland and has everyone he knows play the supporting roles while he narrates. After Nunnally traverses the world, she is guided back to reality by Suzaku who is acting the role of the White Knight. At the end, the cast takes revenge on Lelouch for forcing them into the play by dressing him up as The Hatter. At the end, it is revealed Lelouch is just dreaming.

== Films ==
Title	Original release date
"Code Geass: Lelouch of the Rebellion I — Initiation" Transliteration: "Kōdo Giasu: Hangyaku no Rurūshu I — Koudou" (Japanese: コードギアス 反逆のルルーシュI 興道)	October 21, 2017
"Code Geass: Lelouch of the Rebellion II — Transgression" Transliteration: "Kōdo Giasu: Hangyaku no Rurūshu II — Handō" (Japanese: コードギアス 反逆のルルーシュII 叛道)	February 10, 2018
"Code Geass: Lelouch of the Rebellion III — Glorification" Transliteration: "Kōdo Giasu: Hangyaku no Rurūshu III — Oudou" (Japanese: コードギアス 反逆のルルーシュIII 皇道)	May 26, 2018
"Code Geass Lelouch of the Re;surrection" Transliteration: "Kōdo Giasu Fukkatsu no Rurūshu" (Japanese: コードギアス 復活のルルーシュ)	February 9, 2019
