= Rin Takanashi =

Japanese actress (born 1988)

- 高梨 臨
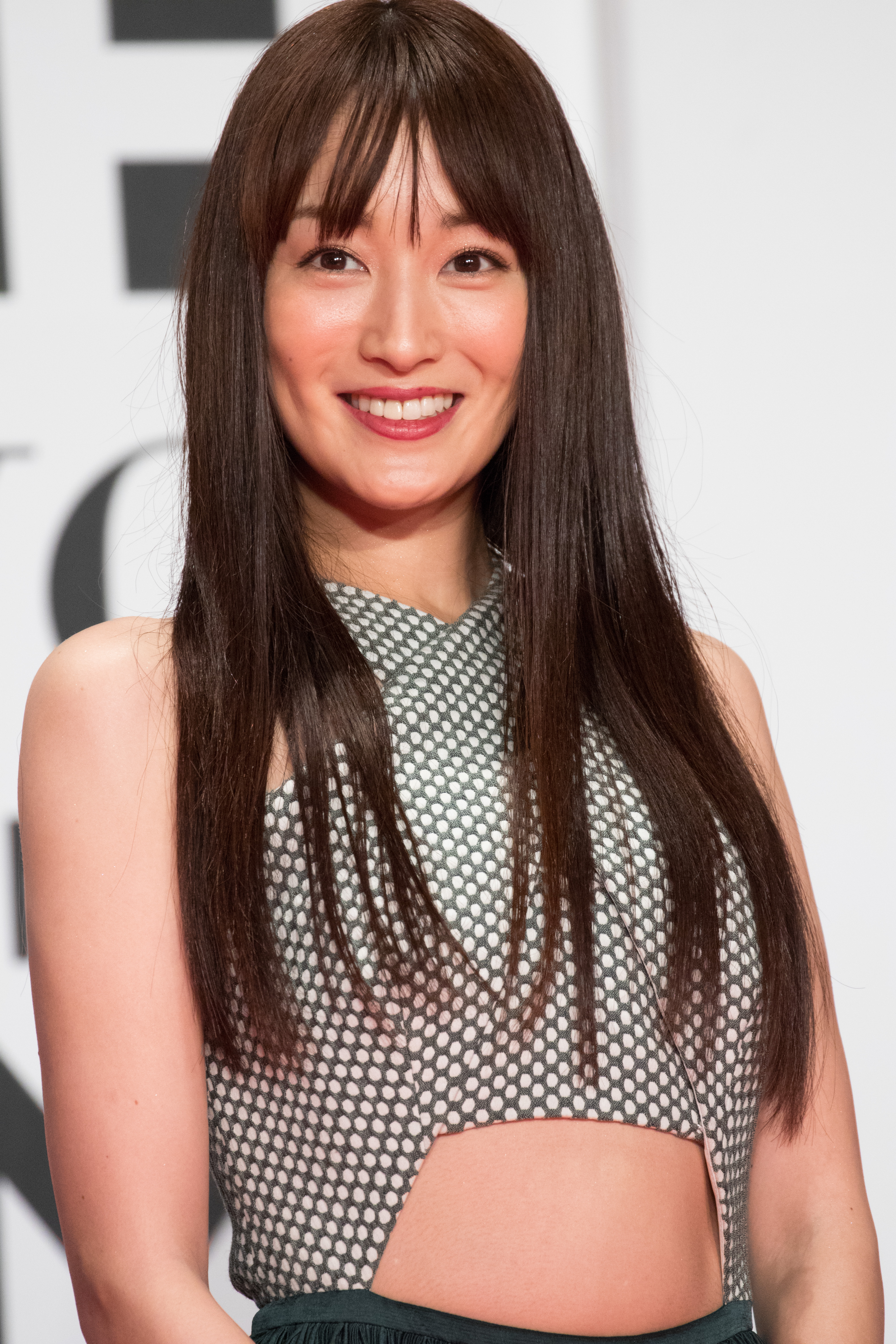
- Rin Takanashi at the Tokyo International Film Festival in 2016
- Born: December 17, 1988 (age 37); Funabashi, Chiba, Japan
- Occupation: Actress
- Years active: 2005–present
- Agent: Stardust Promotion
- Spouse: Tomoaki Makino (m. 2018)
- Website: ameblo.jp/rin-takanashi/

Rin Takanashi (高梨 臨, Takanashi Rin; born December 17, 1988) is a Japanese actress.

== Career ==
Takanashi starred in the 2007 film adaptation of the Japanese novel Goth as one of the lead characters, Yoru Morino. She starred in the 2009 Super Sentai series Samurai Sentai Shinkenger as one of the lead characters, Mako Shiraishi/Shinken Pink. She starred in Kamen Rider W Returns in July 2011. Rin Takanashi is part of the gravure idol group, Pink Jam Princess, with four others.

She co-starred with Ryo Kase in Abbas Kiarostami's 2012 film Like Someone in Love.

== Filmography ==
=== Films ===
- Goth (2008)
- Samurai Sentai Shinkenger The Movie: The Fateful War (2009)
- Samurai Sentai Shinkenger vs. Go-onger: GinmakuBang!! (2010)
- Samurai Sentai Shinkenger Returns (2010)(V-Cinema)
- Tensou Sentai Goseiger vs. Shinkenger: Epic on Ginmaku (2011)
- Kamen Rider W Returns (2011)
- Like Someone in Love (2012)
- Isn't Anyone Alive? (2012)
- Love for Beginners (2012)
- Eve's Lover (2013)
- It All Began When I Met You (2013)
- Killers (2014)
- My Hawaiian Discovery (2014)
- A Sower of Seeds 3 (2016)
- The Door into Summer (2021), Midori Satō
- Cottontail (2022), Satsuki

=== Television ===
- Detective School Q (2007)
- Rookies (2008)
- Tetsudō Musume: Girls Be Ambitious! (2008)
- Kamen Rider Decade (2009) episodes 24 & 25
- Samurai Sentai Shinkenger (2009-2010)
- Neo Ultra Q (2013)
- The Legend of Aterui (2013)
- Hokago Groove (2013)
- Hanako and Anne (2014)
- Tokyo Guard Center (2014)
- Higanbana: Onnatachi no Hanzai File (2014)
- Flashback (2014)
- Masshiro (2015)
- Dr. Rintarō (2015)
- Red Cross: Onna Tachi no Akagami (2015)
- True Horror Stories: Summer 2015 (2015)
- 5→9 From Five to Nine (2015)
- Higanbana (2016)
- Fukigen na Kajitsu (2016)
- Aino Kekkon Soudanjo (2017)
- Koi ga Heta demo Ikitemasu (2017)
- Segodon (2018), Fuki
- DCU: Deep Crime Unit (2022), Akari Wakabayashi (Ep. 1)
- Vivant (2023)
- Malice (2023)
- Unbound (2025), Lady Chiho
- Musashino Rondo (2025), Tamaki Musashibara
