= 17th Japan Film Professional Awards =

Japanese film awards in 2008

- Date: 2008

The 17th Japan Film Professional Awards (第17回日本映画プロフェッショナル大賞) is the 17th edition of the Japan Film Professional Awards. Films of 2007 were eligible, with a focus on independent works not released by major distribution companies. An award ceremony did not take place.

== Awards ==
- Best Film: I Just Didn't Do It
- Best Director: Nobuhiro Yamashita (The Matsugane Potshot Affair, A Gentle Breeze in the Village)
- Best Actress: Eri Ishida (Sad Vacation)
- Best Actor: Ryo Kase (I Just Didn't Do It)
- Best New Director: Daihachi Yoshida (Funuke Show Some Love, You Losers!)
- Best New Director: Keisuke Yoshida (Tsukue no Nakami)
- Best New Encouragement: Hitoshi Matsumoto (Big Man Japan)
- Special: Hiroshi Kobayashi

== 10 best films ==
1. I Just Didn't Do It (Masayuki Suo)
2. Retribution (Kiyoshi Kurosawa)
3. Sad Vacation (Shinji Aoyama)
4. Big Man Japan (Hitoshi Matsumoto)
5. Tama Moe! (Junji Sakamoto)
6. Hannin ni Tsugu (Tomoyuki Takimoto)
6. Sidecar ni Inu (Kichitaro Negishi)
8. The Matsugane Potshot Affair (Nobuhiro Yamashita)
8. Funuke Show Some Love, You Losers! (Daihachi Yoshida)
8. Shindō (Kōji Hagiuda)
