= My Hawaiian Discovery =

- Film poster
- Directed by: Koji Maeda
- Starring: Nana Eikura; Rin Takanashi; Koji Seto; Ryo Kase
- Release date: 14 June 2014
- Running time: 119 minutes
- Country: Japan
- Language: Japanese
- Box office: ¥19.9 million (Japan)

My Hawaiian Discovery (わたしのハワイの歩きかた) is a 2014 Japanese romantic comedy film directed by Koji Maeda and starring Nana Eikura, Rin Takanashi, Koji Seto, and Ryo Kase. It was released on 14 June 2014.

== Cast ==
- Nana Eikura
- Rin Takanashi
- Koji Seto
- Ryo Kase
- Sosuke Ikematsu
- Shingo Tsurumi
- Jun Yoshinaga

== Reception ==
The film has grossed ¥19.9 million in Japan.

On Film Business Asia, Derek Elley gave the film a rating of 6 out of 10, calling it a "rambling but likeable rom-com".
