= Kubi (film) =

2023 film directed by Takeshi Kitano

- Japanese: 首
- Directed by: Takeshi Kitano
- Written by: Takeshi Kitano
- Based on: Kubi by Takeshi Kitano
- Produced by: Takeshi Kitano
- Starring: Takeshi Kitano; Hidetoshi Nishijima; Ryo Kase; Nakamura Shidō II; Tadanobu Asano; Nao Ōmori; Yūichi Kimura; Jun Soejima
- Cinematography: Takeshi Hamada
- Edited by: Takeshi Kitano; Yoshinori Ota
- Music by: Taro Iwashiro
- Production company: Kadokawa
- Distributed by: Toho; Kadokawa
- Release dates: 23 May 2023 (Cannes); 23 November 2023 (Japan)
- Running time: 131 minutes
- Country: Japan
- Language: Japanese
- Budget: ¥ 1.5 billion

Kubi (首; lit. 'Head') is a 2023 Japanese historical samurai film written, directed, produced and edited by Takeshi Kitano, who also stars as Hashiba Hideyoshi (Toyotomi Hideyoshi). The film is based on the novel of the same name, which was released in 2019 and written by Kitano. The film depicts the historical event of the Honnō-ji incident, which took place in the Sengoku period in 1582. Kadokawa Corporation produced the film and co-distributed it in Japan with Toho. The film also stars Hidetoshi Nishijima as Akechi Mitsuhide, Ryo Kase as Oda Nobunaga, Tadanobu Asano as Kuroda Kanbei, Jun Soejima as Yasuke and Nao Omori as Hashiba Hidenaga.

Kubi premiered in the Cannes Premiere section at the 76th Cannes Film Festival on 23 May 2023. It was released in Japan on 23 November 2023.

== Synopsis ==
The timeline of the film covers events from the Siege of Arioka castle in 1579, leading to the Honno-ji Incident and the immediate aftermath of the Battle of Yamazaki in 1582.

The narrative of the film alleges the central role played by interpersonal homosexual relationships across the officer corps of Oda Nobunaga. Nobunaga utilizes his overlordship and maintenance of sexual domination across his generals (most notably Araki Murashige and Akechi Mitsuhide) as his means of intimidating them into loyalty. Nobunaga further dangles the promise of succession to who amongst his generals conquers the most territory for him (alleging that his son Nobutada is incompetent)--while secretly scheming to eliminate the generals and allies who pose the most threat to him (such as Tokugawa Ieyasu and Hashiba Hideyoshi). Murashige, seemingly driven by paranoia and jealousy against Nobunaga's caprices, launched his revolt against Nobunaga (and quickly defeated). Nobunaga, in turn, tasks Mitsuhide to capture and execute Murashige.

However, it is revealed that Murashige and Mitsuhide are in a separate homosexual relationship of their own, and Mitsuhide hides Murashige as he slowly plans his revolt against Nobunaga. Hideyoshi, pointedly the only person in Nobunaga's officer class with no sexual ties to Nobunaga, presents himself as deferential and harmless as possible to both Nobunaga and Ieyasu. In secret, he gathers intelligence against everyone to leverage his position against his allies and enemies. He utilizes this through his ties to unaffiliated ninja clans, peasant recruits, and the auspices of Sen no Rikyu.

Throughout the film, the major daimyo and generals are portrayed very callously--not only in their treatment of their underlings but also their blatant disregard for any observance of purported bushido, readily acceding to violence and skullduggery if it nets their side an advantage. This is illustrated by how Kuroda Kanbei assists Hideyoshi and disposes of assets/allies who may compromise Hideyoshi. Tokugawa Ieyasu, for his part, casually goes through multiple kagemusha who are set up to be assassinated/killed as he moves around and escapes from his enemies. Interweaved in the story are the attempts of peasant Naniwa Mosuke to rise among the ranks of the samurai from thief to ashigaru--not unlike Hideyoshi once did (even as it leads him to murder fellow peasants).

The film culminates in the launching of Mitsuhide's assault at the Honno-ji Temple (but not before abandoning Murashige and throwing him, held in a wooden cage, off a cliff). Nobunaga ultimately dies not from committing seppuku but from an infuriated Yasuke (much abused by Nobunaga throughout the film) beheading him instead, walking away with his head--thus denying Mitsuhide proof of his victory. Exploiting the chaos, Hideyoshi force-marches his army from the Siege of Takamatsu to meet Mitsuhide's forces. Hideyoshi's speed forces a confrontation at Yamazaki, with his armies soundly defeating Mitsuhide's. As Mitsuhide flees defeat, his retainers are harassed and killed by peasant robbers on the road, with Mosuke cornering him. Accepting defeat, Mitsuhide commits seppuku and offers Mosuke his head, finally netting him the chance for promotion. Unfortunately, the robbers also begin to turn on Mosuke and stab him to death.

The film ends with Hideyoshi observing the heads of the casualties of the Battle of Yamazaki. When presented with the heads of Mitsuhide and Mosuke, now much decomposed, he gruffly dismisses them, believing that possessing their heads doesn't matter at this point of his victory.

== Cast ==
- Takeshi Kitano as Hashiba Hideyoshi
- Hidetoshi Nishijima as Akechi Mitsuhide
- Ryo Kase as Oda Nobunaga
- Nakamura Shidō II as Naniwa Mosuke
- Tadanobu Asano as Kuroda Kanbei
- Nao Ōmori as Hashiba Hidenaga
- Yūichi Kimura as Sorori Shinzaemon
- Kenichi Endō as Araki Murashige
- Masanobu Katsumura as Saitō Toshimitsu
- Susumu Terajima as Sahei
- Kenta Kiritani as Hattori Hanzō
- Naomasa Musaka as Ankokuji Ekei
- Makoto Ōtake as Mamiya Buryō
- Kanji Tsuda as Tamezō
- Yoshiyoshi Arakawa as Shimizu Muneharu
- Kanichiro as Mori Ranmaru
- Jun Soejima as Yasuke
- Rie Shibata as Matsu
- Kaoru Kobayashi as Tokugawa Ieyasu
- Ittoku Kishibe as Sen no Rikyū

== Production ==
This film was conceived around the same time as Takeshi Kitano's early directorial work Sonatine (1993). Akira Kurosawa was said to have high expectations, stating, "If Kitano were to make this film, it would be a masterpiece on par with Seven Samurai". The reason it took Kitano 30 years was explained as follows: "Recently, I've been able to gather talented actors in the Kitano-group, and when such excellent actors come together, I felt like it was finally time to make it... and that's how it finally came to fruition," Kitano said.

This film was produced with a budget of 1.5 billion yen, with funding from Kadokawa, and it was shot between April and September 2021.

On August 3, 2022, Weekly Shincho reported that despite the film's editing being nearly 90% complete, there was a dispute between Kitano and Kadokawa over the contract, resulting in a suspension of production. According to the report, Kadokawa sought additional funding from Netflix, but Kitano demanded a portion of it for himself. It was also reported that Kitano was unaware of this funding request and became suspicious, wondering if there were other hidden agendas involved. On the same day, Kitano explained the situation on his official website, stating, "Due to Kadokawa's refusal to finalize the contract, I had no choice but to halt the production. Some staff members were also dissatisfied with the contract terms, and it seems that there were people who hadn't signed contracts until the end of the shoot". He further clarified, "It's not about money. The contract proposed by Kadokawa was extremely one-sided, and I haven't made any unreasonable demands. If they agree to the contract, I will resume the editing work".

== Release ==
On April 15, 2023, it was announced that the film would be released in Japan in the autumn of the same year, and confirmed its date of November 23, 2023, after the Cannes premiere.

The film was selected to be screened as part of the Cannes Premiere section of the 76th Cannes Film Festival, where it had its world premiere on 23 May 2023.

== Reception ==
=== Critical response ===
On Rotten Tomatoes, the film holds an approval rating of 78% based on nine reviews, with an average rating of 6.8/10. On Metacritic, the film has a weighted average score of 67 out of 100, based on seven critic reviews, indicating "generally favorable reviews".

=== Awards and nominations ===
Awards and nominations for Kubi
Award	Date of ceremony	Category	Recipient(s)	Result	Ref.
Cannes Film Festival	26 May 2023	Queer Palm	Takeshi Kitano	Nominated	
Asian Film Awards	10 March 2024	Best Supporting Actor	Nakamura Shidō II	Nominated	
Asian Film Awards	10 March 2024	Best Costume Design	Kazuko Kurosawa	Nominated	
