= Kado: The Right Answer =

Japanese anime television series

- Promotional image

正解するカド (Seikai Suru Kado)
- Created by: Toei Animation
- Anime television series
- Directed by: Kazuya Murata (chief); Masaki Watanabe (series)
- Produced by: Kōichi Noguchi
- Written by: Mado Nozaki
- Music by: Taro Iwashiro
- Studio: Toei Animation
- Licensed by: NA: Funimation
- Original network: Tokyo MX, MBS, BS Fuji, AT-X
- English network: SEA: Animax Asia
- Original run: April 7, 2017 – June 30, 2017
- Episodes: 12 + EP0
- Original net animation

Kado: Beyond Information
- Directed by: Masaki Watanabe
- Produced by: Kōichi Noguchi
- Written by: Mado Nozaki
- Music by: Taro Iwashiro
- Studio: Toei Animation
- Released: May 22, 2018
- Runtime: 120 minutes
- icon

Kado: The Right Answer (Japanese: 正解するカド, Hepburn: Seikai Suru Kado) is a Japanese CG animation television series produced by Toei Animation. The series first aired in April 2017 and ended in June 2017. The series follows master negotiator Kōjirō Shindō, working for the Ministry of Foreign Affairs, as he chooses to represent Yaha-kui zaShunina, an otherworldly entity with the main intention to advance the world by progressively introducing four mysterious devices to humanity. The episode zero, which tells the event before Kōjirō and Shun taking off on the plane, was exclusively distributed via Amazon Prime Video in Japan and Crunchyroll.

== Plot ==
On a plane bound for their business trip, Kōjirō Shindō and his co-worker Shun Hanamori witness the sudden appearance of the Kado, a cube of two kilometers length, out of thin air landing and enveloping their plane. All 252 passengers including Kōjirō, Shun, and the flight crew members are admitted intact into the cube and they encounter a strange being within. This being assumes the form of a human man, identifying himself as Yaha-kui zaShunina, and he wishes to "advance the world".

== Characters ==
=== Main characters ===
Kōjirō Shindō (真道 幸路朗, Shindō Kōjirō)
Voiced by: Hiroaki Miura (Japanese); Ian Mead Moore (English)
A highly skilled negotiator working for the Ministry of Foreign Affairs. He is the only person involuntarily induced with a sense of the anisotropic because he was the first person to exit the Kado when at that time, information about humanity had not been fully processed by the Kado. After meeting Yaha-kui zaShunina, he resigned from his current position and became the negotiator for the anisotropic. He treats Yaha-kui as a normal human and is open to the devices Yaha-kui has introduced to humanity but is later convinced otherwise by Saraka.
Yaha-kui zaShunina (ヤハクィザシュニナ)
Voiced by: Takuma Terashima (Japanese); Jason Liebrecht (English)
A being from a separate Spacetime known as the "anisotropic" whose intention is to accelerate the evolution of humanity. He chose to enter Japan due to the strong feeling of the Japanese that they are superior to other countries. He progressively introduces four devices to humanity: Kado (a cube with powerful computing capabilities), Wam (a pair of spheres containing infinite energy), Sansa (a cross-sectioned brain which induces a sense of the anisotropic when looked at), and Nanomis-hein (a fragmented sphere which can alter gravity, inertia and mass). While not posing a threat initially, Yaha-kui later reveals his true forceful nature in achieving his goals.
Saraka Tsukai (徭 沙羅花, Tsukai Saraka)
Voiced by: M.A.O (Japanese); Mikaela Krantz (English)
The International Negotiator for the Ministry acting on behalf of the Japanese government delegation. Whilst not against the anisotropic itself, she disapproves of the devices Yaha-kui zaShunina introduces as they impact "humanity's dignity" and urged Kōjirō to reassess Yaha-kui's purpose. She is later revealed to be an anisotropic being herself and the administrator of the universe humanity resides within.

=== Government of Japan ===
Shun Hanamori (花森 瞬, Hanamori Shun)
Voiced by: Sōma Saitō (Japanese); Kyle Igneczi (English)
Kōjirō's co-worker. He became the negotiator from the Japanese government to the anisotropic after Kōjirō passed up the offer and gave it to him.
Kōzō Inuzuka (犬束 構造, Inuzuka Kōzō)
Voiced by: Hiroshi Naka (Japanese); Mark Stoddard (English)
Prime Minister of Japan.
Shūhei Asano (浅野 修平, Asano Shūhei)
Voiced by: Kenji Akabane (Japanese); Clay Wheeler (English)
Assistant Secretary for National Public Safety Commission. He went to the same university as Kōjirō.
Ritsu Natsume (夏目 律, Natsume Ritsu)
Voiced by: Shizuka Itō (Japanese); Kristy Sims (English)
Cabinet Secretariat of National Security Agency information team. She went to the same university as Kōjirō and Shūhei. She is in love with Shūhei, but realizes that she "is not capable enough to handle him" so she steps back.

=== Science Council of Japan ===
Kanata Shinawa (品輪 彼方, Shinawa Kanata)
Voiced by: Rie Kugimiya (Japanese); Tabitha Ray (English)
A genius researcher and lead scientist tasked to study the anisotropic. She is one of few people that is capable of creating her own Wam, due to her childlike mind.

=== Others ===
Takumi Gonno (言野 匠, Gonno Takumi)
Voiced by: Takuya Kirimoto (Japanese); Christopher Bevins (English)
A reporter from NNK who becomes interested with the anisotropic. After the video he reported on got billions of views, he got recruited by the CEO of SETTEN, Adam Ward.
Adam Ward (アダム・ワード, Adamu Wādo)
Voiced by: Jin Horikawa (Japanese); John Burgmeier (English)
The CEO of the world's largest internet services, SETTEN who takes interest in Kado and personally hires Takumi to report directly inside the Kado.
Yukika Shindō (真道 幸花, Shindō Yukika)
Voiced by: Yu Serizawa (Japanese); Jill Harris (English)
Kōjirō and Saraka's 16-year-old daughter. By using Nanomis-hein, Kōjirō and Saraka shifted the relative time up to 16 years later, and Shun raised Yukika during that time. She is said to be "Kōjirō and Saraka's trump card" to go against Yaha-kui because she was born from a human and an anisotropic being.

== Media ==
=== Anime ===
In their presentation at Second Quarter 2016's financial result, Toei Animation confirmed that they are producing an original anime project titled Seikai Suru Kado. The official website for the anime went online at the end of August. Mado Nozaki wrote the series, with Kazuya Murata directing the anime, and illustrator Ako Arisaka doing the original character designs. Kōichi Noguchi produced the series. The anime aired from April to June 2017, on Tokyo MX, MBS, BS Fuji, and AT-X with online streaming via Amazon Prime Video M.A.O performed the opening theme "Tabiuta" (旅詩, transl. "Travel Poem") under her character name Saraka Tsukai, and HARUCA for the ending theme titled "Eien no Kotae" (永遠のこたえ, transl. "Eternity's Answer"). Takaya Kamikawa narrates the story at the beginning of each episode. Crunchyroll holds the right for online streaming. Funimation has licensed the series in North America.

No.	Title (Note: All English titles are taken from Crunchyroll.)	Original release date
0	"Ninovo" (Japanese: ニノヴォ)	April 6, 2017
Kōjirō Shindō and Shun Hanamori are negotiators working for the Ministry of Internal Affairs and Communications in Kasumigaseki. Just before a scheduled month-long vacation, Kōjirō and Shun are tasked to buy out the Osakabe Plating Factory in Sagamihara City and convert it into a multi-purpose hall. Kōjirō and Shun tour the factory, and Kōjirō is fascinated by the metal plating technology despite the business going under. Later at a bar, Shun gets tipsy as he encourages Kōjirō to take a vacation. At night, Kōjirō researches more on metal plating technology after tucking Shun in bed. The next day, Kōjirō and Shun eventually return to the Osakabe Plating Factory, and Kōjirō says that the owner will have one month to perfect a new form of metal plating technology. After a month has passed, the metal plating technology has proven to be a success without needing to buy out the factory. At Haneda International Airport, a mysteriously massive cube materializes and swallows a plane with 252 passengers preparing for takeoff, including Kōjirō and Shun.
1	"Yaha-kui zaShunina" (Japanese: ヤハクィザシュニナ)	April 7, 2017
On July 25, 2017, at Haneda International Airport, Kōjirō and Shun, who are now negotiators working for the Ministry of Foreign Affairs, board a flight for a business trip. A mysteriously massive cube then materializes and swallows the plane with 252 passengers preparing for takeoff, including Kōjirō and Shun. In Kasumigaseki, Ritsu Natsume, who is working for the Cabinet Secretariat, researches news about the cube before receiving an email that Kōjirō and Shun were onboard the missing plane. During a cabinet conference meeting, it is evident that the cube is two kilometers per side, and the plane was absorbed by the cube, not crushed by it. Theoretical physicist Kanata Shinawa later coins the term "fregonics", or incredible isolation, which means that it is impossible for any type of object to pass through the cube. Using the artillery of the Japan Ground Self-Defense Force, the northeast corner of the cube is penetrated, and a black sphere pops out. Suddenly, Kōjirō steps out from the top corner of the cube, and soon behind appears Yaha-kui zaShunina, an alien being who introduces himself to humanity.
2	"Novo" (Japanese: ノヴォ)	April 14, 2017
Yaha-kui uses the cube displayed with powerful computing capabilities, known as Kado, as an amplifier in order to have Kōjirō project his voice to local broadcasting. Kōjirō says that Yaha-kui wants to set up direct communication with the Japanese government within three hours. Before leaving back inside Kado, Kōjirō mentions that all passengers are safe and unharmed. 28 hours ago, Kōjirō ventures outside the plane, and a nude Yaha-kui struggles to communicate with him. After using Kado to absorb information through Kōjirō's cellphone, Yaha-kui is able to fully communicate. 25 hours ago, Yaha-kui clothes himself after demonstrating that he is capable of providing food to all the passengers for 30 days. 23 hours ago, Yaha-kui says that Kado is a boundary unit and Novo is the primary source. 10 hours ago, Yaha-kui plans to exit Kado to announce his purpose of advancing the world, but he requires assistance from Kōjirō first. In the present time, Yaha-kui and Kōjirō appear outside the middle edge of Kado, as Yaha-kui challenges humanity not to think of him as a friend or foe.
3	"Wam"; Transliteration: "Wamu" (Japanese: ワム)	April 21, 2017
Yaha-kui sends Kōjirō to see Saraka Tsukai from the Ministry of Foreign Affairs, who is acting on behalf of the Japanese government delegation. After Kōjirō tells Saraka that Yaha-kui is requesting a public venue for negotiations, they plan to hold it right at Haneda International Airport. At the runway during the public venue, Yaha-kui grabs Saraka's water bottle using his hand from the territory Novo and retrieves it back into the universe, dubbing the term "anisotropic", more or less a hyperdimensional realm. Yaha-kui further explains that Kado is a boundary unit and a transforming mechanism, but passing through the boundary will result in discord and friction, hence why humanity came up with fregonics. After it is assured that the other passengers will be released in a month, Yaha-kui reveals that he wants to improve charity, using bread to eat as a metaphor. Then, he introduces Wam, a pair of spheres, and reveals that it can provide endless energy. Finally, he cuts off all power supplies surrounding the runway and replaces them with Wam, proving how advanced his energy resources are.
4	"Rotowa" (Japanese: ロトワ)	April 28, 2017
After three days since the incident, a mother and son have been released from the cube. Kōjirō chooses only to be the negotiator for the anisotropic. During the first anisotropic problem response planning meeting, Kōjirō reviews what Wam can do, while Saraka says that Yaha-kui has offered 167 Wam in their possession so far. However, the United Nations Security Council is threatening to issue sanctions if Japan is given full control of Wam. Later, Saraka expresses her disapproval of Yaha-kui to Kōjirō, since Yaha-kui does not grasp the concept of good and evil. At the National Institute for Integrated Sciences, Kōjirō and Saraka learn that Wam works like a battery, but too much reliance on Wam might result in future global warming. Kōjirō returns inside Kado, informing Shun of his new job as the special government envoy to the anisotropic, which puts him last on the passenger release list. After telling Yaha-kui that five countries of the United Nations Security Council may plan to use Wam as nuclear weapons, Kōjirō rushes back to the planning meeting, only to discover that the United Nations Security Council already unanimously agreed for Japan to hand over Wam.
5	"Nanoka" (Japanese: ナノカ)	May 5, 2017
Yaha-kui has Kōjirō meet with Kanata in an electromagnetic interference shielded room at the Defense Ministry Technology Research Headquarters, where Kōjirō gives Kanata 97 percent of inactive Wam at her disposal. Kōzō Inuzuka, the prime minister of Japan, privately meets with Yaha-kui, who explains that Kōjirō and Kanata were placed in the shielded room for full concentration under their current time limit. Yaha-kui further mentions that humanity is divided into nations, which results in conflicting views. Although Kōzō cannot blame Yaha-kui for eventually springing up national conflict by introducing Wam to Japan, it is ultimately a human matter to resolve the issue. However, Yaha-kui offers a solution, prompting Kōzō to request an emergency press conference. Kōzō publicly announces that Japan will hand over all 196 Wam to the United Nations Security Council, while Kōjirō has Kanata demonstrate how to successfully create Wam out of paper, causing a media uproar.
6	"Tetrok"; Transliteration: "Tetoroku" (Japanese: テトロク)	May 12, 2017
Other than Kanata with her childlike mind and Kōjirō with his mind processed by Kado, no one else can successfully create Wam out of paper. After Kōjirō suggests that Yaha-kui should move Kado elsewhere, Yaha-kui proposes that Sayama Lake would be the best location. Following news reports of the relocation on August 8, 2017, Shūhei Asano, assistant secretary for National Public Safety Commission, recommends that Kado should be moved after all passengers are released. Kōjirō and Yaha-kui figure out how to move Kado with the least amount of effect on the populace. Therefore, they decide to send transportation restrictions and notices of a temporary evacuation for the populace in compliance of a route for Kado to pass by. On August 21, Kōjirō decides to visit his mother, where they talk about Yaha-kui while sharing grilled squid and beer together. On August 25, Shun is the last passenger to leave Kado. On August 26, Yaha-kui repositions Kado on its edge, rolling it all the way from Haneda International Airport in the morning to Sayama Lake in the evening.
6.5	"Ekwari"; Transliteration: "Ekuwari" (Japanese: エクワリ)	May 19, 2017
This is a half-hour recapitulation of the first six episodes, which documents the events spanning 33 days.
7	"Sansa" (Japanese: サンサ)	May 26, 2017
Adam Ward, CEO of SETTEN, the world's largest internet services, hires Takumi Gonno, a reporter from NNK with great interest in the anisotropic. Takumi and his crew approach Kado in a helicopter, pleading for Yaha-kui to grant them an interview. After Kōjirō welcomes Takumi and his crew, Kōjirō guides them to Yaha-kui further inside Kado. Kōjirō and Yaha-kui introduces Sansa, a cross-sectioned brain inducing a sense of the anisotropic. Takumi and his crew see images of themselves upon looking at Sansa. The purpose of Sansa is to eliminate the need to sleep. Yaha-kui says that he turned to the government for sharing Wam, but now he needs the help of the media for sharing Sansa. Later, Kōjirō takes Yaha-kui to a local festival, with Saraka, Shun, Shūhei and Ritsu tagging along, as they enjoy the carnival games. After Kōjirō informs Shūhei and Ritsu about Sansa, Saraka privately tells Kōjirō that she wants to send Yaha-kui back to the anisotropic.
8	"Talnel"; Transliteration: "Taruneru" (Japanese: タルネル)	June 2, 2017
Inside Kado, Takumi contacts Adam, informing him about Sansa and the idea of broadcasting it worldwide. Luckily, SETTEN has an unused satellite perfect for a simultaneous broadcast. Meanwhile, Saraka takes Kōjirō to her family home, meeting her brother and father, who mistake Kōjirō and Saraka as a couple at first. Saraka's father makes a metal ornament of a dragon for Kōjirō. After spending time in an aquarium and a water bus, Kōjirō begins to realize that Saraka is happy with the way that the universe is right now. The next day, as the world broadcast is set to premiere in the evening, Kōzō reminds Kōjirō of his freedom of choice. During the world broadcast, Takumi has Yaha-kui talk about how Sansa has the ability to alter human consciousness and expand cognitive perception. Yaha-kui reveals Sansa to the world, but Kōzō feels like he made the wrong move in authorizing the world broadcast. After Kōjirō shares his second thoughts to Saraka, he calls for Yaha-kui to have a talk inside the center of Kado.
9	"Nanomis-hein"; Transliteration: "Nanomisuhain" (Japanese: ナノミスハイン)	June 9, 2017
After sharing a bitter sip of beer together, Yaha-kui reveals Nanomis-hein, a fragmented sphere, to Kōjirō. In simple terms, Nanomis-hein has control over gravity, inertia and mass, more or less "the arm of the anisotropic". Although Kōjirō believes this will put humanity in a speculative bubble as product distribution, transportation and space exploration would be revolutionized, Yaha-kui says that humanity's production will never exceed its consumption. Meanwhile, noting that he is aware that Saraka loves Kōjirō, Shun lets Saraka know that Ritsu once loved Kōjirō but stepped back. Yaha-kui explains that the anisotropic has 37 more dimensions than the universe. He also elaborates on information cocoons, information harvested by anisotropic beings from data threads, meaning that the universe was created by the anisotropic beings. Yaha-kui asks Kōjirō to join him in the anisotropic, but Kōjirō hesitates to give a response. Instead, Yaha-kui prepares to destroy Kōjirō after determining that he is not ready. However, Saraka breaks her ring and forcefully enters Kado, protecting Kōjirō from being killed and revealing her true nature as an anisotropic being.
10	"Towanosakiwa'" (Japanese: トワノサキワ')	June 16, 2017
A scene is shown of how the universe was created by the anisotropic beings spanning 9.8 billion years. After Earth was created 4 billion years ago, time is fast forwarded to when Saraka was born 24 years ago. As a child, Saraka's father scolded her for running off alone before saying that life is precious and should be treated as a gift. As a teenager, she studied abroad in America, remembering what her father said to her as a child. In the present, Yaha-kui hinders Saraka from attacking, then tells Kōjirō that humanity's information cocoon will be removed and transferred to the anisotropic. Kōjirō and Saraka try to convince Yaha-kui that he is making a big mistake, since humankind only has one life to live. Yaha-kui then uses Kado to eradicate Saraka, but Kōjirō takes the hit at his right hip. Saraka wails in agony as she transports him inside an isolated box in order to escape and heals his wound. Yaha-kui leaves Kado with a clone of Kōjirō, unbeknownst to humanity, introducing Nanomis-hein to them.
11	"Wanoraru" (Japanese: ワノラル)	June 23, 2017
While Nanomis-hein is being distributed worldwide, Saraka tells Kōjirō that the relocation will succeed if humanity assimilates with the anisotropic as much as possible. However, the only method to stop this from happening is to use an isolator in the shape of a small stellated dodecahedron, but there needs to be a way to neutralize the fregonics first. Saraka teleports Kanata and Shun inside the isolated box, as Kōjirō enlists their help. They all go to the Osakabe Plating Factory and request the construction of a fregonics generator in hopes of negotiating with Yaha-kui. Although Saraka worries for Kōjirō's life in the matter, Kōjirō plans to remove talking from his negotiation with Yaha-kui. Kōjirō and Saraka then share a heartfelt kiss. After doing a test run on the fregonics generator, Kanata coins the term "antigonics", forcing Wam to interact with each other to create a countercurrent. Inside Kado, Yaha-kui recounts the many times that Kōjirō has failed him as he is surrounded by numerous defective clones of Kōjirō. The clone of Kōjirō is sucked into Kado, which then towers over Japan. However, Kōjirō and Saraka appear before Yaha-kui on top of Kado.
12	"Yukika" (Japanese: ユキカ)	June 30, 2017
Yaha-kui configures a platform for him and Kōjirō away from Saraka. As Kado continues to grow over Japan and cause panic among the citizens, Yaha-kui explains to Kōjirō how the singularity of a human makes them unique, but Kōjirō refuses to join Yaha-kui and go to the anisotropic. Realizing that Kōjirō is truly unique, Yaha-kui regains his composure and prepares to battle Kōjirō. Yaha-kui stabs Kōjirō through the chest and disables the fregonics generator. It turns out that Yaha-kui was watching through hyperspace via Kanata's Nanomis-hein when the fregonics generator was being constructed. Yaha-kui rips out Kōjirō's heart as the two share a tearful farewell, while Saraka yells in despair. As Yaha-kui lays Kōjirō on an altar, Yukika Shindō suddenly steps out of a car driven by Shun and easily attacks Yaha-kui. It is shown that Kōjirō and Saraka used Nanomis-hein to conceive and raise Yukika while inside the isolated box for 16 years up to relative time. After Yukika explains that there is no difference between humanity and the anisotropic, she destroys Yaha-kui, which dissolves Kado. One month later, Kōzō publicly announces that Yaha-kui and his devices are now lost, but humanity still has knowledge that the anisotropic exists.
12.5	"Beyond Information"; Transliteration: "Jōhō o Koete" (Japanese: 情報を超えて)	July 9, 2022
This is a two-hour recapitulation of all twelve episodes, which documents the events spanning four months. This episode is made available to watch on YouTube.

=== Manga ===
A manga adaptation was launched on March 22, 2017, in Kodansha's Morning Two magazine. Mutsumi Okuhashi illustrates the manga while Mado Nozaki has been credited for the original work.

A spin-off manga titled Seikai Suru Kado: Aoi Haru to Railgun (正解するカド 青い春とレールガン; transl. Kado - The Right Answer: Blue Spring and Railgun) was launched on North Star Pictures' Web Comic Zenyon website on April 29, 2017. Kōki Ochiai draws the manga. The story takes place after episode 5 and follows a group of high school students whose lives are radically changed with the arrival of Kado and the infinite energy source, Wam.
