= Dr. Rintarō =

- Genre: Drama
- Written by: Miho Nakazono; Mio Aiuchi
- Directed by: Nobuo Mizuta; Jun Aizawa
- Starring: Masato Sakai; Yū Aoi; Michiko Kichise; Yuki Uchida; Rin Takanashi; Kenichi Endō; Renji Ishibashi; Atsuko Takahata; Fumiyo Kohinata
- Country of origin: Japan
- Original language: Japanese
- No. of series: 1
- No. of episodes: 10

Production
- Producers: Hisashi Tsugiya; Eiji Ōtsuka
- Running time: 60 minutes
- Production companies: K-Factory, Inc.

Original release
- Network: NTV
- Release: 15 April – 17 June 2015

Dr.Rintarō (Dr.倫太郎; English title "Dr. Rintaro, Psychiatrist") is a Japanese television drama series based on the novel by Shinkai Sei. It premiered on NTV on 15 April 2015, starring Masato Sakai in the lead role. It received the viewership rating of 12.7% on average.

== Cast ==
- Masato Sakai as Rintarō Hino, a psychiatrist
- Yū Aoi as Yumeno, a geisha who works in Shinbashi
- Michiko Kichise as Yuriko Mizushima, a surgeon and Hino's childhood friend
- Yuki Uchida as Kaoru Kiryū, a nurse
- Rin Takanashi as Yōko Kawakami, an intern who loves Hino
- Fumiyo Kohinata as Kazuo Ennōji, a hospital director
- Kimiko Yo as Ikumi Masuda, a geisha house mother
- Kenichi Endō as Shigeto Araki, Hino's senior doctor

== Episodes ==
No.	Title	Directed by	Original release date	Ratings (%)
1	"悩める子羊達よ、さぁ! あなたの心を診ましょうか"	Nobuo Mizuta	15 April 2015	13.9
2	"恋愛は一過性の精神疾患のようなもの、そう僕は思っていた"	Nobuo Mizuta	22 April 2015	13.2
3	"愛に包まれた夫婦に起きた真夜中のDV事件!?"	Jun Aizawa	29 April 2015	13.7
4	"踊る精神科医と踊れないバレリーナ! セクハラ疑惑は突然に!"	Nobuo Mizuta	6 May 2015	13.9
5	"これは恋？精神科医はギャンブル依存少女に賭ける!?"	Nobuo Mizuta	13 May 2015	10.8
6	"愛と憎しみの境界線とは？精神科医を襲うストーカー事件！"	Jun Aizawa	20 May 2015	12.6
7	"心を閉ざした少年に起きた奇跡!?ボクがママを守る!"	Nobuo Mizuta	27 May 2015	12.3
8	"白い巨塔の陰謀!視力を失った脳外科医の野望と決断"	Jun Aizawa	3 June 2015	11.0
9	"絶体絶命のスキャンダル!?仕組まれた破滅への道!"	Nobuo Mizuta	10 June 2015	12.7
10	"一番大切なものとは?人生をかけた最後の選択"	Nobuo Mizuta	17 June 2015	13.0

== In other media ==
In 2015, the variety show AKBingo! featured several skits titled Dr. Parutaro (Dr.パル太郎), in which the titular doctor, portrayed by Haruka Shimazaki, is a deadpan "psychiatrist for idols" who offers dubious advice to her patients. The character has also appeared in a live performance.
