= A.I.C.O. -Incarnation- =

Japanese ONA series

- Promotional art for the series, prominently featuring Aiko Tachibana and Yuya Kanzaki
- Genre: Science fiction
- Created by: Bones (Note: Original Work (原作)); Kazuya Murata (Note: Original Plan (原案))
- Manga
- Written by: Hiroaki Michiaki
- Published by: Kodansha
- English publisher: NA: Kodansha USA
- Magazine: Monthly Shōnen Sirius
- Original run: November 25, 2017 – July 9, 2019
- Volumes: 3
- Original net animation
- Directed by: Kazuya Murata
- Produced by: Naoki Amano; Hirotsugu Ogisu; Yōhei Kisara; Shinro Sugimoto; Yoshihiro Takeshita
- Written by: Yuuichi Nomura
- Music by: Taro Iwashiro
- Studio: Bones
- Licensed by: Netflix
- Released: March 9, 2018
- Runtime: 24–28 minutes
- Episodes: 12
- icon

A.I.C.O. -Incarnation- is a Japanese science fiction original net animation (ONA) series produced by Bones. The series premiered worldwide on Netflix in March 2018. A manga adaptation by Hiroaki Michiaki was serialized in Kodansha's Monthly Shōnen Sirius from November 2017 to July 2019, with its chapters collected in three tankōbon volumes, and has been licensed for English release in North America by Kodansha USA.

== Plot ==
In 2035, a biological research project to create an Artificial and Intelligent Cellular Organism (A.I.C.O.) went awry, resulting in an incident called the "Burst" which transformed Kurobe Gorge into a quarantine area infested by a rampant growth of synthetic organisms called Matter. Two years later, high school student Aiko Tachibana finds that she may be the duplicate of a girl trapped within the Matter whose family disappeared in the Burst. An enigmatic fellow student, Yuya Kanzaki, offers to solve the mystery by taking her with a group of professional Divers to the Primary Point, which was the center of the Burst.

== Characters ==
Aiko Tachibana (橘 アイコ, Tachibana Aiko)
A cheerful, energetic girl. After losing her family in the Burst, she was mortally wounded, and her brain was installed in an artificial body. She meets a new transfer student named Yuya Kanzaki, and is shocked by what he tells her about her family and her own body. She decides to join forces with Yuya to recover her family.
Yuya Kanzaki (神崎 雄哉, Kanzaki Yūya)
A new student at Aiko's school and the other protagonist of the series, with a mature and aloof demeanor. He tells Aiko the truth about her reconstruction and joins the Divers to reach Primary Point. His objective is to put an end to the Burst, but much about him is shrouded in mystery. However, it is later revealed that he is Toshihide Yura, one of the doctors and researchers at Kiryu Biotech Research Facility who died at the start of the 'Burst" incident, and whose brain was implanted in an artificial organism called the "Duplicate One" by Susumu Kurose, who somehow was able to salvage Yura's body.
Daisuke Shinoyama (篠山 大輔, Shinoyama Daisuke)
Leader of the Divers and Shiraishi's partner. Despite his tough and intimidating appearance, he is gentle and mild-mannered. Driven by a strong sense of responsibility, he always puts the needs of his team members first. He gathered his team in response to Kurose's request.
Maho Shiraishi (白石 真帆, Shiraishi Maho)
One of the Divers and Shinoyama's partners. Kind, gentle, and easygoing, she supports Shinoyama and the team with meticulous attention to everything ranging from vehicle operation and maintenance to making arrangements for food supplies.
Yoshihiko Sagami (相模 芳彦, Sagami Yoshihiko)
One of the Divers and Kazuki's partners. Once a member of a military special forces unit, he is highly skilled in combat. He has the ability to calmly make decisions based on the situation and take appropriate action. He can be strict at times with Kazuki, but is a caring and reliable older brother type. He is deadly with any weapon, from heavy firearms to knives.
Kazuki Minase (水瀬 一樹, Minase Kazuki)
One of the Divers and Sagami's partners. While he is a relatively new Diver, he makes up for his lack of experience with spirit and enthusiasm. He uses his talents in electronics to support his partner, Sagami. He has a prosthetic right hand based on artificial life form technology.
Haruka Seri (芹 遙香, Seri Haruka)
One of the Divers and Kaede's partners. Cool-headed, beautiful, and intelligent. Before the Burst, she was an artificial life form researcher. Well-versed in scientific equipment, she prefers efficient tactics that leverage her prior experience in sharp contrast to her partner Kaede's reliance on intuition. She shows a strong interest in Malignant Matter.
Kaede Misawa (三沢 楓, Misawa Kaede)
One of the Divers and Haruka's partners. Blessed with exceptional physical abilities and animal-like intuition. She specializes in close-quarters combat and preemptive strikes. Her words are often direct and impulsive, appearing as straightforward or alternatively inconsiderate and rough.
Susumu Kurose (黒瀬 進, Kurose Susumu)
One of the artificial life form researchers at the Kiryu Biotech Research Facility. Developer of the "Cell Assembler" technology. He has an easygoing, carefree persona, but is willing to take some risks to achieve his objectives. He provides support to Yuya and Aiko from outside the area. He and Isazu were in the same year in college, and Nanbara was one year ahead of them.
Kyōsuke Isazu (伊佐津 恭介, Isadzu Kyōsuke)
Head of Kiryu Hospital and the doctor in charge of Aiko's care. Like Kurose, he is part of the Kiryu Biotech Research Facility. As one of the artificial life form researchers, he developed the "Carbon Nanostructure" technology. His only daughter, Yuzuha, is in a coma following an accident, and he struggles with his inability to find a way to treat her.
Akiko Nanbara (南原 顕子, Nanbara Akiko)
Chief of the CAAC (Control Agency of Artificial Creatures) Response Bureau and a central figure in the government's efforts to promote artificial life form technology. She supports the effort to recover research results from the area infested by Malignant Matter. She has known Isazu and Kurose since college.

=== Voice cast ===
Cast
Character	Japanese	English	
Character	Japanese	Iyuno Media	Bang Zoom
Aiko Tachibana	Haruka Shiraishi	Christina Jopling	Xanthe Huynh
Yuya Kanzaki	Yusuke Kobayashi	Alex Alvarez	Billy Kametz
Daisuke Shinoyama	Ryōta Takeuchi	Phil DuBois	Chris Tergliafera
Maho Shiraishi	Ai Kayano		Erika Harlacher
Yoshihiko Sagami	Makoto Furukawa	Travis Roig	Greg Chun
Kazuki Minase	Taishi Murata	Jason Kesser	Khoi Dao
Haruka Seri	Kaori Nazuka	Crystal Lopez	Allegra Clark
Kaede Misawa	Mao Ichimichi	Paula Barros	Erica Mendez
Susumu Kurose	Tōru Ōkawa		Keith Silverstein
Kyousuke Isazu	Takehito Koyasu	Sahid Pabon	Ray Chase (as Sam Ryder)
Akiko Nanbara	Atsuko Tanaka		Rachel Robinson

== Production ==
Internet streaming service Netflix announced the series during their "Netflix Anime Slate 2017" event on August 2, 2017, as well as their plans to release it simultaneously worldwide in spring 2018. The announcement was part of Netflix's plan to introduce more original content onto their platform in 2018, including 30 new anime series. The series is directed by Kazuya Murata at studio Bones. Bones had previously filed a trademark for the title on April 27, 2017, which covered anime, games, and merchandise.

The series is written by Yuuichi Nomura with character designs by manga artist Hanaharu Naruko. Chief animation director Satoshi Ishino is adapting the designs for animation. The rest of the design team includes Tomoaki Okada, who provides concept designs, Takeshi Takakura, in charge of mechanical designs, and Kazuhiro Miwa, who provides matter designs. Junichi Higashi is the series' art director, Reiko Iwasawa serves as color key artist, and Kōki Ōta serves as CGI director. Hikaru Fukuda is the director of photography, while Kumiko Sakamoto is the editor for the anime. UTAMARO Movement is producing the sound under sound director Jin Aketagawa, with sound effects created by Tomoji Furuya.

The music for the series is composed by Taro Iwashiro and produced by music recording company Lantis. The opening theme song, "A.I.C.O.", is performed by Japanese singer True, and the ending theme song, "Unknown Beyond" (未知の彼方, Michi no Kanata), is performed by Haruka Shiraishi, who voices Aiko Tachibana.

== Release ==
The 12-episode series is an original net animation (ONA), and premiered worldwide exclusively on Netflix on March 9, 2018. Originally dubbed in English by Seoul-based Iyuno Media Group, the series was redubbed by Bang Zoom! Entertainment in October 2018.

== Episodes ==
No.	Title	Original release date
1	"Contact" "Sesshoku" (Japanese: 接触)	March 9, 2018
School student Aiko Tachibana uses a wheelchair after an accident that also killed the rest of her family. After encountering a new transfer student, Yuya Kanzaki, she is mysteriously able to walk again. Kanzaki takes her to visit her family home for the first time since the accident, where they are pursued by C.A.A.C. (Control Agency of Artificial Creatures) agents and escape to the old town. Aiko and Kanzaki are met there by a group of people who reveal that her body is a fake.
2	"Target" "Hyōteki" (Japanese: 標的)	March 9, 2018
In the Town, Susumu Kurose says that Aiko's brain was transplanted into an artificial body, while an artificial brain was transplanted into her physical body. Kanzaki reveals that Aiko's mother and brother are still alive in a prohibited area called Primary Point. This is where, two years ago, an abnormal artificial organic life form called the Burst was created at the Kiryu Research facility during her operation. Now called the Malignant Matter, it has flowed downriver, forcing humanity to retreat towards the Sea of Japan. Kanzaki shows her images of what happened during the Burst, and Aiko is finally convinced of her situation. As the group plans an expedition into Primary Point, their headquarters are attacked by the C.A.A.C.
3	"Decision" "Ketsudan" (Japanese: 決断)	March 9, 2018
Nanami Ozanami of the C.A.A.C detains Aiko and Kanzaki, the Divers manage to break them out and prepare for an expedition to Primary Point. Kanzaki fits a Mind Scanner to Aiko, and she experiences the Burst and sees her mother and brother's capture by the Matter. Meanwhile, the Matter becomes active again, and the C.A.A.C. launches a barrage of tranquilizer missiles against the A.I.C.O. (Artificial and Intelligent Cellular Organism) to subdue it. The Divers proceed with their plan, which involves splitting into two groups. The team dons Live Suits that both protect them and enhance their strength. They are unaware, however, of the link between Aiko and her duplicate, and of the bioactive substances she produces that can attract the Matter. The group clears the Gate just as the government orders an evacuation of the area.
4	"Encounter" "Sōgū" (Japanese: 遭遇)	March 9, 2018
Shortly after entering Area One, the Divers come under attack from Malignant Matter but manage to stop it. Kanzaki distributes vial cartridges containing a drug to inhibit Matter activity. Aiko recognises it as the drug that she has previously been injected with at Kiryu Hospital. At C.A.A.C. headquarters, they propose to destroy the Matter, but Akiko argues that it gives Japan a technological advantage. As the Divers advance in Area One, the Matter creates human-like beings, but they are easily destroyed. The teams split up and reach the Guillotine Shutter at K1, which they activate, electrifying the Matter and providing a reprieve. Back in the city, the C.A.A.C. detects that the Guillotine Shutter was activated.
5	"Memory" "Kioku" (Japanese: 記憶)	March 9, 2018
The Divers team enters the abandoned Yanagawara Camp, where they rest and resupply. Aiko joins Minase Kazuki on guard duty, wanting to explore the area. In Town, Kurose meets Nanbara, interested to know why she has moved to Town from the capital and to find out about C.A.A.C.'s intentions, but she reveals little information. Back at Yanagawara Camp, Aiko drops a clear sphere, which was a present from her father. It appears to be a sample organism that Holo Habolis gave to customers, and it turns into a creature and escapes from the camp. Aiko goes outside to find it, causing alarm among the team. Kanzaki finds it and returns it to her, and she names it Gummi. It is revealed that only Maho Shiraishi and Kanzaki know about Aiko's effect on the Matter. Meanwhile, C.A.A.C. operatives enter Area One.
6	"Awakening" "Kakusei" (Japanese: 覚醒)	March 9, 2018
As the Divers team proceeds, Kaede engages in reckless behavior while attacking the Matter, which causes damage to their Beetle vehicle and delays the group's progress to point K2. Kanzaki fits Aiko with a helmet system to establish Dream Contact with her body at Primary Point. In Town, Nanbara discusses with Izazu the need to recover Aiko as the prime example of their advances in artificial organisms. Aiko accesses her memories, but she seems to see events that are not part of her own memories. The Divers team advances towards point K2, which they must reach before sunrise to enter Area Three. They run into Malignant Matter, which resists their weapons. Kazuki manages to obtain a sample, which Kanzaki uses to modify their weapons, making them more effective, while Aiko seems to be able to predict the direction of its attacks and helps the team to direct their fire. Back in Town, Isazu tells Kurose that he has been dismissed for his use of funds from Dr. Kiryu's research budget. On the move again in Area Two, the Divers team is confronted by C.A.A.C. Special Forces.
7	"Breakthrough" "Toppa" (Japanese: 突破)	March 9, 2018
The C.A.A.C. Special Forces Squad demands that the Divers hand over Aiko, but Kanzaki refuses. Suddenly, Matter attacks the Special Forces Squad, and Haruka realizes that it is attracted to light. She distracts it by firing flares in the opposite direction, and they follow its retreat. Aiko feels guilty about the risk to the Divers if they proceed further because her body is not human, which is accidentally overheard by Haruka. In Kiryu Hospital, Kurose has data deleted from the server and discovers that the brainwaves of Yuzuha, the unconscious daughter of Kyouske Isazu, are active at the same time as Matter activity. Meanwhile, Isazu tells the hospitalized Professor Kiryu, inventor of the cell assembler, which was later developed by Yura, that he will continue the research to save his daughter. As the Divers team continues, they are attacked by Matter, which manages to enter the Beetle and capture Aiko, sealing her within a liquid-filled pod. However, she finds a weapon and uses it to crystallize the Matter. They recover her unconscious body, which is covered in carbon nanostructures. Haruka confirms that she is a composite, and Daisuke realizes they have been carrying Matter bait with them.
8	"Way" "Kōro" (Japanese: 行路)	March 9, 2018
The Divers confront Aiko and Kanzaki over the information that they withheld, but eventually agree to continue with the mission. Meanwhile, Professor Kiryu dies, and Isazu becomes the lab director. Kurose tells Nanbara what he found about Yuzuha's connection to the Matter, assuming that Isazu also knows. The Divers continue with their mission; however, each time they crystallize the matter, Aiko suffers intense pain, and the carbon nanostructures reappear on her body. Kurose updates Kanzaki about Yuzuha, and Isazu learns about Unit One. As the Divers continue to K4, the Matter attacks become more frequent, persistent, and more humanoid in shape. They fight on, and Daisuke is mortally wounded, but they manage to reach K4 and activate the guillotine, temporarily stopping the Matter. Isazu continues his research and deduces that when Dr. Yura died, Kurose used the body of Unit One to preserve his consciousness as Yuya Kanzaki.
9	"Truth" "Shinjitsu" (Japanese: 真実)	March 9, 2018
Aiko confronts Kanzaki about what will happen to the other Aiko when they reach Primary Point, but they are interrupted by another Matter attack. The team presses on, within sight of K5 and Primary Point, the Kiryu Biotech Research Facility Two. They are attacked by a large humanoid form of Matter, which captures Aiko, Kanzaki, and Maho. Aiko sees visions of the Burst, but then the Matter releases them safely, and they enter the facility. Isazu manages to patch in a video feed from Kiryu Hospital to Primary Point and confronts Kanzaki, whom he addresses as Toshihide Yura. Haruka confirms that Kanzaki is Unit One, and Isazu reveals that, to end the Burst, the duplicate Aiko must be destroyed. Also, the original Aiko Tachibana caused the Burst during the operation to create the duplicate Aiko (A.I.C.O.). Main character Aiko is the artificial brain in the original body, the duplicate, and Kanzaki intends to induce programmed cell death in her brain before returning it to the artificial body to kill it and thus end the Burst. The duplicate Aiko runs away in confusion, but is enveloped by the Matter, where she meets the original Aiko.
10	"Volition" "Sentaku" (Japanese: 選択)	March 9, 2018
As the two Aikos speak to each other inside the Malignant Matter, the rest of the team tries to reach a bunker in the basement before the government JSDF launches an all-out attack on the Malignant Area. Trying to find Aiko, humanoid Matter engulfs Kanzaki, where he becomes Yura and talks to Yuzuha, who pleads with him to rescue her from her situation. The original Aiko tells her duplicate about the Burst accident and her transformation into the Matter, and thanks her duplicate for experiencing the memories of the life her duplicate lived, which kept her sane and conscious, allowing her to keep limited control over the Matter. She then promises to try to suppress the Matter, and duplicate Aiko is released from the Matter. She manages to find Aiko's mother and brother and promises to rescue them, while original Aiko frees Kanzaki.
11	"Devotion" "Kyōji" (Japanese: 矜持)	March 9, 2018
While Aiko tells Kanzaki about the original Aiko's plan to sacrifice herself, Isazu establishes a link to and takes control of Yuzuha's humanoid Matter so he can interrogate Kanzaki/Yura and analyse Aiko's brain to save his daughter. Kanzaki explains how, as Yura, he accelerated the duplicate Aiko's brain development using Dream Contact to channel the original Aiko's memories to create a fully formed duplicate brain. Kazuki suddenly arrives and frees Aiko and Kanzaki from the Matter, and they head for the basement shelter while the JSDF prepares to incinerate the entire Area despite Nanbara's objections. They reach a storeroom where Kazuki awkwardly declares his love for Aiko and promises to save her, but she says he loves the wrong person. Meanwhile, Nanbara sends in a team of Divers to collect matter samples and stall the JSDF action. Kanzaki sends a message to Kurose to sever the link between the unconscious Yuzuha and the many duplicates of her body that were created within the Matter. Meanwhile, Kanzaki, Aiko, and Kazuki reach ALSUS, the multi-purpose surgical installation where the original operation took place two years earlier.
12	"Reincarnation" "Saisei" (Japanese: 再生)	March 9, 2018
At ALSUS, Kanzaki, Aiko, and Kazuki find that the Matter has engulfed the facility. Aiko prepares to sacrifice herself to destroy the Burst, but Kanzaki has a change of heart, accepting that she is the real Aiko, too, and swears to save her. As Kanzaki inserts Aiko into the Matter for the brain transfer, Isazu activates all of the Yuzuha duplicates to attack her. The Divers fight to protect Aiko during the brain transfer surgery, but it is a losing battle until they fire an Anti-Cell Assembler capsule onto the Matter. While back at Kiryu Hospital, Kurose severs the link between Yuzuha and her duplicates. This has the effect of shutting down Isazu and the Matter, returning Yuzuha to consciousness. Kanzaki completes the brain transfer, and the original Aiko emerges from the Matter, greeting the Divers for the first time. The duplicate Aiko, still trapped inside, frees Aiko's mother and brother. As the Matter slowly crystallizes, a creature crawls out, transforms, and finally, a regenerated Aiko emerges. Kanzaki assumes that Gummi, who was trapped inside the Matter with her, had a copy of Aiko's body data. The two Aikos embrace, then the duplicate Aiko goes to greet her family, before swapping places with the original Aiko. Life returns to normal for the original Aiko, while the duplicate leaves to live her own life and create her own name and memories.

== Reception ==
A.I.C.O. -Incarnation- received average to positive reviews from critics and audiences. IGN contributor Shuka Yamada gave the series a rating of 7.5 out of a possible 10, writing that the series was a "Meticulously crafted sci-fi anime with some pretty major ups and downs ". Theron Martin of The Anime News Network gave the series sub a rating of "B+" and the dub a "B−", praising the cohesive storytelling and production value, but criticized its English dubbing. Setsuken, the owner of website Anime-Evo, praised the series in a review of the series, writing, "Its nothing transcendent, but there's a confidence and a display of clear skill in how it takes some tried and true concepts that we haven't seen in years, and effortlessly brings them back for the current modern age." In contrast, Kayla Cobb of Decider, gave the series a deeply negative review, referring to it as a knock off of Ghost in the Shell.

== Other media ==
The original soundtrack for the series, including both of the theme songs and the series' background music, was released on a two-disc CD set on March 28, 2018.

A manga adaptation by Hiroaki Michiaki launched in Kodansha's shōnen manga magazine Monthly Shōnen Sirius on November 25, 2017. Kodansha USA has licensed the series for digital publication.

No.	Original release date	Original ISBN	English release date	English ISBN
1	March 9, 2018	978-4-06-511028-7	April 10, 2018	9781642122145
2	October 9, 2018	978-4-06-513056-8	October 22, 2019	9781646590865
3	July 9, 2019	978-4-06-516208-8	December 10, 2019	9781646591626
