= Gargantia on the Verdurous Planet =

Japanese anime television series and its adaptations

- Key visual of the series

翠星のガルガンティア (Suisei no Gargantia)
- Genre: Mecha; Science fantasy
- Manga
- Written by: Wataru Mitogawa
- Published by: Kadokawa Shoten
- Magazine: Newtype Ace (January 10 – July 10, 2013); Kadokawa Niconico Ace (July 16, 2013 – January 28, 2014)
- Original run: January 10, 2013 – January 28, 2014
- Volumes: 3
- Anime television series
- Directed by: Kazuya Murata
- Written by: Gen Urobuchi
- Music by: Taro Iwashiro
- Studio: Production I.G
- Licensed by: NA: Viz Media; UK: Crunchyroll (Note: Through Crunchyroll UK and Ireland (formerly known as Manga Entertainment).)
- Original network: Tokyo MX, YTV, CTV, BS11
- Original run: April 7, 2013 – June 30, 2013
- Episodes: 13
- Manga

Mizuhana no Bellows
- Written by: Hiroki Uchida
- Illustrated by: Shū
- Published by: Enterbrain
- Magazine: Famitsu Comic Clear
- Original run: June 7, 2013 – January 30, 2015
- Volumes: 2
- Original video animation
- Directed by: Kazuya Murata
- Written by: Gen Urobuchi
- Music by: Taro Iwashiro
- Studio: Production I.G
- Licensed by: AUS: Hanabee Entertainment; NA: Viz Media; UK: Crunchyroll
- Released: August 28, 2013 – October 25, 2013
- Runtime: 24 minutes
- Episodes: 2
- Original video animation

Far Beyond the Voyage
- Directed by: Kazuya Murata
- Written by: Gen Urobuchi; Daishiro Tanimura
- Music by: Taro Iwashiro
- Studio: Production I.G
- Released: November 21, 2014 – May 27, 2015
- Runtime: 55 minutes
- Episodes: 2
- Light novel

Haruka, Kaigō no Tenchi
- Written by: Daishiro Tanimura
- Illustrated by: Hanaharu Naruko, Makoto Ishiwata
- Published by: Enterbrain
- Imprint: Famitsu Bunko
- Original run: August 29, 2015 – March 30, 2016
- Volumes: 2
- icon

Gargantia on the Verdurous Planet (Japanese: 翠星のガルガンティア, Hepburn: Suisei no Gargantia) is a Japanese anime television series produced by Production I.G and directed by Kazuya Murata, and aired between April and June 2013. A manga adaptation began serialization in Kadokawa Shoten's Newtype Ace magazine in January 2013.

== Plot ==
In the distant future, humankind has taken to the stars and formed the Galactic Alliance of Humankind (人類銀河同盟, Jinrui Ginga Dōmei). The Galactic Alliance is engaged in a perpetual war with a squid-like alien species known as the Hideauze (ヒディアーズ, Hidiāzu). Sixteen-year-old Ensign Ledo is a soldier in the Galactic Alliance, piloting a Machine Caliber (マシンキャリバー, Mashin Kyaribā), an artificial intelligence-automated, humanoid-shaped mecha, which he refers to as "Chamber". After a failed attempt by the Galactic Alliance to destroy an enemy super-weapon, Ledo is knocked into a wormhole and loses consciousness.

When he awakens, he discovers that he and Chamber have been "salvaged" by a rag-tag band of "primitive" human scavengers aboard the Gargantia, a massive fleet of ships on an ocean-covered planet. Chamber tells him that local star charts reveal the planet is Earth, the birthplace of humanity, a place that members of the Galactic Alliance were only familiar with from stories and believed was a myth. Ledo must adjust to the language, culture and lifestyle of the planet, while finding his new purpose in life aboard the Gargantia.

== Characters ==
=== Main characters ===
Ledo (レド, Redo)
Voiced by: Kaito Ishikawa (Japanese); Alan Lee (English)
A 16-year-old Galactic Alliance ensign. Trained as a soldier since birth, Ledo finds himself shipwrecked on Earth following a failed attempt by the army to destroy the Hideauze's home planet. As he interacts with his new surroundings and gets used to the crew of the Gargantia, Ledo is exposed to some concepts of human society long forgotten by his civilization (or at least obscured from its soldiery) due to its permanent state of total war against the Hideauze, like entertainment, cooperation and tolerance. Ledo gradually grows attached to his new friends on Gargantia.
Chamber K6821 (チェインバー, Cheinbā)
Voiced by: Tomokazu Sugita (Japanese); Matthew Mercer (English)
Chamber is Ledo's masculine mecha and artificial intelligence assistant; a mass produced robot used in great numbers by the Galactic Alliance of Humankind. Chamber describes itself as a program designed specifically to ensure that its pilot excels at his or her assigned task, which in the case of Ledo is a soldier. Upon meeting the people of the Gargantia, Chamber manages to analyze and decode their language to act as a translator between Ledo and the people on Gargantia.
Amy (エイミー, Eimī)
Voiced by: Hisako Kanemoto (Japanese); Cassandra Lee Morris (English)
A 15-year-old messenger who meets Ledo when he wakes up from hibernation and serves as his guide. She becomes Ledo's first and best friend, and from all the members of Gargantia, she is the one who gets closest to him, usually keeping him company and encouraging his efforts to fit himself into the fleet's environment. She eventually falls in love with him.
Striker X3752 (ストライカー, Sutoraikā)
Voiced by: Ayumi Fujimura (Japanese); Karen Strassman (English)
A Galactic Alliance feminine robot designed for higher ranked soldiers originally used by Ledo's superior officer, Kugel. Off-screen, they also crash-land on Earth and join a fleet, but assume totalitarian militaristic control over it. After Kugel dies from illness, Striker assumes his identity and continues to command the fleet, serving as the series antagonist in later episodes.
Ridget (リジット, Rijitto)
Voiced by: Sayaka Ohara (Japanese); Laura Post (English)
A 22-year-old high rank officer at the Gargantia, she is Fleet Commander Fairlock's second in command and daughter of his predecessor, Chevron. Following Fairlock's death, she takes over as Fleet Commander, following his wish.
Bellows (ベローズ, Berōzu)
Voiced by: Shizuka Itō (Japanese); Julie Ann Taylor (English)
The 18-year-old leader of the Gargantia's excavation team.
Pinion (ピニオン, Pinion)
Voiced by: Katsuyuki Konishi (Japanese); Patrick Seitz (English)
The head of the Gargantia's repairmen. His older brother was killed by whalesquid, and upon learning of Ledo's intention to exterminate them due to their connection to the Hideauze, he decides to assist him with the pretense of exploring the whalesquid territory for salvage work. After Ledo clears the area of the whalesquid, Pinion claims the technology salvaged by his crew to establish his own fleet, which is later annexed to Kugel's fleet. In the occasion, Pinion is appointed to be chief technician of Kugel's fleet in charge of developing weapons for it.

=== Supporting characters ===
Kugel (エイミー, Eimī)
Voiced by: Yūki Ono (Japanese); Marc Diraison (English)
Kugel was the commander of all Machine Caliber pilots aboard the GAH carrier Lamorak. As a commander he was privy to the knowledge that the Hideauze were humans who modified themselves to be able to live in outer space. Kugel piloted the machine caliber Striker X3752. 5 carriers were seen at the Closer pass but only one Striker Machine Caliber was seen during the battle, so the depths or extent of Kugel's authority is not fully known. He eventually dies and Striker takes command in his death.
Bebel (ベベル, Beberu)
Voiced by: Yuka Terasaki (Japanese); Michelle Ruff (English)
Amy's 10-year-old little brother with an illness that compromises his health, thus he is usually bedridden, and only moves by a wheelchair. He befriends Ledo, who treats him as a younger brother.
Fairlock (フェアロック, Fearokku)
Voiced by: Hideaki Tezuka (Japanese); Geoffery Chalmers (English)
The fleet commander of the Gargantia, who despite being sick, refuses to relinquish his post. He appoints Ridget as his successor just before he passes away.
Saaya (サーヤ, Sāya)
Voiced by: Ai Kayano (Japanese); Natalie Hoover (English)
Amy's friend and a reserved 15-year-old messenger.
Melty (メルティ, Meruti)
Voiced by: Kana Asumi (Japanese); Janice Roman Roku (English)
A hyper 14-year-old messenger who is also Amy's friend. She leaves Gargantia along with the many who decide to follow Pinion's plan.
Grace (グレース, Gurēsu)
Voiced by: Ai Kayano (Japanese); Michelle Ruff (English)
Amy's pet flying squirrel.
Oldham (オルダム, Orudamu)
Voiced by: Hideyuki Umezu (Japanese); Steve Mann (English)
The resident doctor aboard Gargantia who is seen as the "sage" and runs a library atop a tower.
Lukkage (ラケージ, Rakēji)
Voiced by: Ayumi Tsunematsu (Japanese); Johanna Luis (English)
A pirate leader who launched an attack on the Gargantia after Ledo kills some of her men to protect Bellows and her crew. Some time after being defeated by the Gargantia's forces with Ledo's help, she reappears as part of Kugel's fleet, yet she helps to rebel against it.
Flange (フランジ, Furanji)
Voiced by: Eizō Tsuda (Japanese); Doug Stone (English)
A major shipleader in the Gargantia who agrees with Pinion's plan and secedes from the fleet to accompany his efforts to reclaim technology from ancient civilizations. Later he is forced to join Kugel's fleet along the rest of his crew.

=== Other characters ===
Reema (リーマ, Rīma)
Voiced by: Inori Minase
A new character from the OVA series, she is a former member of Kugel's fleet who moves to the Gargantia and becomes the newest member of Amy's messenger team. She is later revealed as a spy for an unknown party, ordering a machine which resembles Chamber.
Crown (クラウン, Kuraun)
Voiced by: Mitsuaki Hoshino (Japanese); Kyle Hebert (English)
One of the ship commanders on the Gargantia.
Mayta (マイタ, Maita)
Voiced by: Sora Tokui (Japanese); Caitlin Chang (English)
A young repair girl aboard Gargantia. She joins Pinion when he leads a group of the fleet away.
Onderia (アンダーア, Andāa)
Voiced by: Yumi Uchiyama (Japanese); Danielle McRae (English)
A mysterious lady.
Storia (ストーリア, Sutōria)
Voiced by: Yui Horie (Japanese); Shelby Lindley (English)
Ridget's childhood friend. She is gentle-hearted, but she is brisk and efficient when it comes to her nursing job. Seven years before, Storia left the Gargantia to live with Ritona.
Ritona (リトナー, Ritonā)
Voiced by: Yuichi Nakamura (Japanese); David Vincent (English)
An old acquaintance of Ridget, he was chief mechanic of another fleet who went derelict after its main engine was damaged beyond repair. Before that, he falls in love with Storia and takes her to live with him.

== Production ==
Gen Urobuchi explained on the official website that the message of the story is aimed towards those in their teens and 20s, who are either about to enter into society or recently have, and is meant to cheer them on and to encourage them that "going out into the world isn't scary". He also said that the feeling of this work will be different from others he's been involved with.

The anime was directed by Kazuya Murata and produced by Production I.G with character design by Hanaharu Naruko. Gen Urobuchi supervised and wrote the first and last episodes of the series. The anime aired on Tokyo MX from April 7 to June 30, 2013. It was streamed by Crunchyroll. A web short titled "Petit Gargantia" (Puchitto Gargantia) streamed on their official site for each episode. On March 30 and 31, 2013, at the Anime Contents Expo Bandai Visual's booth gave away 8000 copies of the first two episodes on Blu-ray Disc. The opening theme is Kono Sekai wa Bokura o Matte Ita (この世界は僕らを待っていた; "This World Has Been Waiting For Us") by Minori Chihara while the ending theme is Sora to Kimi no Message (空とキミのメッセージ; "Sky and Your Message") by ChouCho. An OVA 14th episode was released along with first Blu-ray Disc box set on August 28, 2013, and another, 15th, was released with the third one on October 25, 2013. The sets also include subtitles in English. At Anime Expo 2013, Viz Media announced their license to the anime, as well as plans to stream the series on their website and Hulu and release it on DVD and Blu-ray Disc in 2014. On January 14, 2014, Manga Entertainment announced that it has licensed the series in the United Kingdom. The two-part OVA sequel, titled Gargantia on the Verdurous Planet: Far Beyond the Voyage (翠星のガルガンティア ～めぐる航路、遥か～, Suisei no Gargantia ~Meguru Kōro, Haruka~), was released in Fall 2014 and Spring 2015. A planned second season was unable to be produced; however, the scenario was turned into a pair of novels.

Development of Gargantia on the Verdurous Planet began around November 2010, according to producer Nao Hirasawa. Mechanical designer Makoto Ishiwata said that he began his design work about two months in, and that the mechanical designs were focused on bringing out aspects of the plot. The roundness of the Machine Caliber's design was meant to bring out a sense of gentleness and familiarity. The difference between the personalities of Chamber and Striker were to represent a sense of a child and a grown adult.

After about a half year's worth of production, Kazuya Murata was brought in as the series director. Murata had been harboring the desire to work on a story involving people living on ships atop a world of water about ten years before the series started. Some of the story had already been arranged, but he introduced the concept of people living on giant boats, and Urobuchi liked the idea a lot, and quickly worked it into the story. According to Urobuchi, as they revised the plot further, Murata tended to have a very good sense of judgement as to what to put in and what not to put in, and was clear about what he was looking for, so the organization went a lot more smoothly than he thought it might have. Urobuchi was put in charge of writing the first and last episodes once the green-light was given for a thirteen-episode series in order to set the theme for the other writers.

Some weeks after the series started airing, a character design contest related to the anime series was announced. It was hosted on Pixiv, and Murata and staff members of Production I.G judged the entries submitted until the deadline of May 12. Originally only one among the submitted designs would be chosen, however there were twelve entries which impressed the judges to the point of announcing all of them as winners. The twelve chosen characters made an appearance in the series finale on June 30, 2013.

== Episodes ==
No.	Title	Written by	Original release date
1	"Castaway"; Transliteration: "Hyōryūsha" (Japanese: 漂流者)	Gen Urobuchi (Nitroplus)	April 7, 2013
Humans have left Earth to make a paradise in space named Avalon as humanity's new home, creating the Galactic Alliance of Humankind to expand their journey through it. Mollusk-like lifeforms known as Hideauze appeared as a threat before the Galactic Alliance, and a war rages between them. Ensign Ledo and his Machine Caliber Chamber K6821, join the latest attack against the Hideauze. The attack eventually ends in failure and a retreat order is issued by Ledo's superior, Kugel. However, Ledo is unable to return, and he is cast out into space. Six months later, the crew members of the salvage ship Gargantia retrieve Chamber from the bottom of the ocean, but are unable to take it apart. After everyone leaves, Ledo decides to explore and examine his current location, only to be noticed by Pinion, head of the repairmen. Ledo kidnaps a courier named Amy, as he is chased to the outside and cornered on a pylon by the entire crew. He finds out that he is on a habitable planet, which shocks him enough to release Amy. Then, he summons Chamber, who confirms that this is the planet of humanity's origin.
2	"The Planet of Origin"; Transliteration: "Hajimari no Wakusei" (Japanese: 始まりの惑星)	Daishirō Tanimura	April 14, 2013
Ledo stays pinned on the pylon and attempts to open a friendly dialogue with Ridget, the fleet commander's aide, while Chamber translates for Ledo and surprises the crew members by being an unmanned machine. After Ridget discusses with the other crew members what to do with Ledo, Amy visits her bedridden younger brother Bebel, to give him a small ship's wheel to complete his model ship. Amy later approaches Ledo with fish to eat as a friendship ritual. She explains that this planet called Earth was once frozen over, and some humans chose to stay. The ice eventually melted and became a vast ocean, in which many people form fleets to salvage old technology from below. Looking for other items of advanced technology, Ridget sends Bellows, leader of the excavation team, to the point where Chamber and Ledo were found, but Bellows's ship is attacked by pirates. Amy asks Ledo to help them, and he agrees with the intention of earning their trust. Ledo boards Chamber and efficiently kill the pirates with no harm to Bellows's ship and crew, as Amy and the others watch in shock at Chamber's destructive power.
3	"The Villainous Empress"; Transliteration: "Burai no jotei" (Japanese: 無頼の女帝)	Gan Saaku (Nitroplus)	April 21, 2013
Amy disapproves of Ledo's actions, and the leaders of the Gargantia discuss the eventual retaliation they may suffer. Bellows brings Amy to talk with Ledo, and they explain to him that weapons must be used only as a last resort, as people must rely on each other to survive in their world. After Amy reconciles with Ledo, a large pirate fleet led by the pirate empress Lukkage launches an attack and slowly approaches the Gargantia. Ledo discusses the situation with Ridget and agrees to help them once more, in exchange for being accepted aboard the fleet. Instructed to defeat the enemies with no casualties, Ledo disables the pirate ships in the front lines and returns to the Gargantia to deal with a sneak attack led by Lukkage herself, piloting her custom humanoid-shaped mecha called the Surfing Lobster Yunboro. Ledo battles and easily defeats Lukkage, forcing the pirates to flee. Upon being saluted by the crew of the Gargantia, Ledo is greeted by Amy and replies by thanking her, the first native expression that he learned.
4	"The Flute of Recollection"; Transliteration: "Tsuioku no Fue" (Japanese: 追憶の笛)	Toriko Nanashino	April 28, 2013
After thwarting Lukkage's sneak attack, Ledo receives an invoice to pay for his collateral damage, although Ridget says that he shall be relieved from the living expenses and the fee of having Chamber aboard. While Chamber helps the other workers, Ledo is seen sculpting the Hideauze claw that he always carries with him. He gives it to Amy, who plans to pass it to Bebel later during the day. Amy takes Ledo to see resident doctor Oldham, who explains to him that most of humankind's old technology is lost, thus it is impossible for the Gargantia to help him return to space. Amy takes Ledo to meet Bebel, who asks Ledo about his life in space. It soon starts to rain a little, and Ledo helps collect rainwater to replenish the fleet's freshwater supply. Bebel realizes that Ledo was actually carving a flute. As Bebel plays it, Ledo recalls a long forgotten memory that makes him cry. After asking Bebel to return the flute to him, Ledo later wonders if he should learn more about their surroundings, while Chamber mentions that he must eventually leave it all behind when returning to his unit.
4.5 (OVA 1)	"Abandoned Fleet"; Transliteration: "Haikyo Sendan" (Japanese: 廃墟船団)	Toriko Nanashino	August 28, 2013
Set between episodes 4 and 5. The crew of the Gargantia comes across an abandoned, derelict fleet, and Ledo joins a small group sent there to investigate it while looking for treasures. Amy and her friends sneak aboard their ship and end up joining the search party. Upon finding an old picture, Ridget realizes that the fleet used to be where her childhood friend Storia lived after she left the Gargantia seven years ago with her boyfriend Ritona. A flashback shows when Ritona saved Ridget from a fall after she was done manually interlocking a fleet, and Storia bandaged Ritona's head and leg in the infirmary. Ritona showed Ridget an old-fashioned camera that he made, and Storia had some tearful thoughts to share with Ridget before she left with Ritona. In the present, upon checking up the main ship, Pinion deduces that the fleet's inhabitants were forced to abandon it after the power generator was broken beyond repair. The group returns to the Gargantia empty-handed, except for Ridget, who kept the picture of Storia and Ritona for herself.
5	"Calm Day"; Transliteration: "Nagi no Hi" (Japanese: 凪の日)	Daishirō Tanimura	May 5, 2013
Ledo decides to look for a job, but he fails to find a vacant post up to his skills or willingness. Soon after, the Gargantia stops moving for maintenance, taking advantage of the "calm day", when the winds and waves are absent, with all workers having some free time except repairmen. Despite being a repairman himself, Pinion invites Ledo and Amy, along with her fellow couriers Saaya and Melty, to the beach. Due to an energy shortage, Pinion is unable to cook meat, sending Ledo on an errand while using Chamber as a grill. Amy, Saaya and Melty are tasked by Ridget to turn on the sprinkler on the top of a crane tower, and the three take the opportunity to make it a race on surf kites. During the race, Amy saves Ledo from being pursued by three male transvestites eager to hire him. The girls return to the party after finishing their job, with Ledo arriving soon after bringing a bottle of sauce, the item that Pinion asked him to fetch from a hag. Before the calm day ends, Amy informs Ledo that Pinion arranged the party to cheer him up since he could not find a job.
6	"Festival"; Transliteration: "Shanikusai" (Japanese: 謝肉祭)	Norimitsu Kaihō	May 12, 2013
Ledo takes up work as a fisherman, but he finds himself unable to pilot a Diver Yunboro and sends Chamber to assist the other fishermen instead. Pinion then invites Ledo for lunch and offers him a position on his repairmen crew, but Bellows appears and also offers him a job on her excavation team. As Amy, Saaya and Melty dance for the crowd at the festival, Ledo points his gun at a cooked octopus, mistaking it for a Hideauze. However, Pinion and Bellows assure him that it is good food, not an enemy. Since Chamber is rather messy with his capture of fish, Ledo boards Chamber to help the other fishermen properly obtain a nice catch using large nets. Later that night, Amy spends some time alone with Ledo, and the two become closer. A natural ocean lighting puts Ledo in state of alert. He arms himself to defend Amy, until she calms him down and dances for him upon his request. On the following day, Ledo does salvage work with Bellows, and things go smoothly until an underwater creature appears. As Chamber identifies it as a Hideauze, Ledo abandons his work to confront it.
7	"A Soldier's Fate"; Transliteration: "Heishi no Sadame" (Japanese: 兵士のさだめ)	Daishirō Tanimura	May 19, 2013
Despite Bellows's pleas, Ledo kills the creature known as a whalesquid, considered a sacred animal on the planet, and news of its death spread rumors of an impending misfortune towards the Gargantia. Pinion plans to draft Ledo into his crew in order to explore the uncharted whalesquid territory and salvage its treasures, but Bellows tries to deter him. After Chamber analyzes that whalesquid are indeed similar to the Hideauze, Ledo is determined to exterminate them all, despite Amy and Bebel attempting to change his mind earlier. When a huge number of whalesquid are seen approaching the Gargantia, fleet commander Fairlock orders a temporary shutdown on all machinery and lights to prevent any provocation as the whalesquid pass under the Gargantia. Ledo ignores Amy when she tries to stop him from fighting the whalesquid, but he is forced to stand down when Ridget points a gun at him until all the whalesquid pass under without any incidents. Fairlock is informed by Pinion of his plan, and ship commander Flange declares his intention to accompany Pinion with his ship. As both express their objective to secede from the Gargantia, Fairlock tries to dissuade them until he suffers from a heart attack.
8	"Separation"; Transliteration: "Ribetsu" (Japanese: 離別)	Toriko Nanashino	May 26, 2013
Before his death, Fairlock appoints Ridget as his successor. Meanwhile, Chamber informs Ledo that he finally managed to pinpoint the location of their civilization in space, but it may take thousands of years until someone picks up their distress signal due to their current location on Earth. As Fairlock's funeral is held, several dissident ships agree to follow Pinion's plan and prepare themselves to secede from the Gargantia. With Melty deciding to leave with them, Amy later tells Saaya that she cannot abandon Bebel, even though Ledo is leaving as well. Bellows reminds Ridget to not burden herself, as she will always have the rest of the fleet to support her. Seeing how much his sister is suffering with Ledo's decision to leave, Bebel tries to discourage Ledo from leaving. However, Ledo says that his drive to kill the whalesquid also comes from his desire to protect both Amy and Bebel from the Hideauze. Ridget then sees Fairlock off as his body is sent into the ocean, and she asks the members of the Gargantia to lend her their support. Soon after, a devastated Amy watches as the dissident ships leave the Gargantia, with Ledo aboard them.
9	"Deep Sea Secret"; Transliteration: "Shinkai no Himitsu" (Japanese: 深海の秘密)	Norimitsu Kaihō	June 2, 2013
Ledo starts his offensive on the whalesquid nest, assisted by Pinion's crew and their barrage of depth charges, obliterating the enemies without much effort. Pinion recalls when he witnessed his older brother being killed by whalesquid during a failed mission to find treasure. While investigating an ancient facility, Ledo finds some records in a storage box. Upon accessing them, he learns that the Hideauze were once humans who underwent heavy genetic modifications to adapt themselves to space environment, calling themselves "Evolvers". Viewing their efforts as blasphemy, a faction of humankind declared war on them, leading to their current conflict after both sides abandoned Earth during the fifth Ice Age, except for the ancestors to the current humans and whalesquid living on the planet. Devastated by this revelation, Ledo shouts in despair when Chamber slays a Hideauze child without his permission. Back at the Gargantia, both Bebel and Amy show signs of how much they miss Ledo.
10	"Island of Ambition"; Transliteration: "Yabō no Shima" (Japanese: 野望の島)	Daishirō Tanimura	June 9, 2013
With all the Hideauze in the area killed, Pinion and his crew manage to salvage rare ancient technology. However, Pinion says that his crew has the right to keep the technology for themselves, sending a radio broadcast to other fleets to warn them to keep out of his crew's territory. As this broadcast reaches the Gargantia, the fleet is already reorganized and there is concern that other ships may leave to join Pinion's side. Using an ancient cannon, Pinion forces a crew of hostile pirates to surrender and join his fleet. Meanwhile, Ledo hears from Chamber that the lightbugs that humankind used as a power source were also created by the Hideauze, which further proves their discovery. Ledo then questions if there is still a need to keep fighting the Hideauze after all they learned. Chamber comes to the conclusion that the Galactic Alliance and the Hideauze simply cannot coexist, seeing as one side evolved and perfected their civilization while the other relinquished civilization altogether, thus their conflict is inevitable. Chamber then informs Ledo about a transmission from a Galactic Alliance vessel. As a huge fleet approaches them, Ledo sees Kugel still alive inside his Machine Caliber atop the vessel.
10.5 (OVA 2)	"The Oracle's Altar"; Transliteration: "Marebito no Saidan" (Japanese: まれびとの祭壇)	Toriko Nanashino	October 25, 2013
Following the battle against the Hideauze in space, Kugel and Striker were stranded on Earth just like Ledo. Meanwhile, a young girl named Linaria is pursued by her three half-sisters, who intend to dispose of her after their deceased father nominated her as the leader of their pirate fleet. After Kugel drives the attackers away, Linaria believes that Kugel is a god and asks for his help to regain control of her fleet. Months later, Kugel leads the fleet as a figurehead for Linaria until her half-sisters decide to dispose of him by provoking some whalesquid to attack. Realizing that the whalesquid are in fact Hideauze, he wipes out their nest and claims that humankind had fallen from grace by treating the Hideauze as gods. Linaria says her last words of gratitude as she dies from a disease some time later. When Linaria's eldest half-sister attempts to replace her as Kugel's herald, he kills her instead and throws both half-sisters' bodies into the ocean. Assuming control of the fleet and slowly dying from the same disease that killed Linaria, Kugel decides to rule it with an iron grip, believing that he will eventually lead it to prosperity.
11	"Supreme Ruler of Terror"; Transliteration: "Kyōfu no Haō" (Japanese: 恐怖の覇王)	Norimitsu Kaihō	June 16, 2013
Kugel contacts Ledo and instructs him to return to active duty. Upon reuniting with Kugel, Ledo learns that Kugel is struck with some disease that does not allow him to leave his cockpit. When Ledo tells Kugel that he learned that the Hideauze are originally humans, Kugel reveals that he always knew about it, just like the high command of the Galactic Alliance. Despite that, Kugel insists to fight the Hideauze, and all this time he was organizing a powerful fleet with an occult militaristic society in order to rally all the humans on Earth under them. Pinion is summoned to Kugel's fleet, surprised to be taken there by Lukkage, who is now working under Kugel. Then, Pinion is approached by Kugel's Machine Caliber Striker X3752, who offers him a post as an engineer to repair and develop weapons for the fleet. The rest of his companions are also forced to join Kugel's fleet in separate departments. Some time later, Kugel discusses with Ledo the next step of his plan, a large scale operation which, much to Ledo's shock, somehow involves the Gargantia.
12	"Moment of Decision"; Transliteration: "Ketsudan no Toki" (Japanese: 決断のとき)	Daishirō Tanimura	June 23, 2013
Pinion is approached by Lukkage, who is planning a rebellion at the fleet. Ledo tries to dissuade Kugel from preparing to attack the Gargantia, but with no success. Confused about what he should do, Ledo witnesses the people of the fleet throwing their sick and weak into the ocean. Realizing that the same will be done to Bebel, Ledo decides to confront Kugel by himself. Accepting Ledo's decision, Pinion equips Chamber with some extra weapons, while Lukkage and Flange make preparations for the impending uprising. Melty is instructed by Ledo to deliver a message to the Gargantia. However, she almost faints by traveling so far by herself and is rescued by Amy. Informed about Kugel's attack, the crew of the Gargantia considers to abandon the fleet as Ledo recommended. Instead, Amy urges that they should do something to help Ledo as well, and Oldham suggests Ridget to make use of the special key that Fairlock entrusted her. As the rebellion begins, Ledo, assisted by Pinion's crew, fights Kugel, while the pirates, led by Lukkage, attack the fleet's soldiers. When Ledo finally manages to pin down Kugel and open Striker's cockpit, it is revealed that Kugel was long dead inside it.
13	"Legend of the Verdurous Planet"; Transliteration: "Midori no Hoshi no Densetsu" (Japanese: 翠の星の伝説)	Gen Urobuchi (Nitroplus)	June 30, 2013
Striker reached the conclusion that it was necessary for the humans to view her as their god to ensure stability of the fleet. Both Ledo and Chamber disagree with her philosophy and decide to destroy her. Ledo merges his nervous system with Chamber's interface to increase Chamber's capabilities, but risking Ledo's life. However, Amy appears soon after to tell Ledo that he does not need to fight alone. Meanwhile, at the Gargantia, Ridget uses the special key to activate an ancient mass driver stored inside the main ship, using it to bombard the enemy fleet. Pinion evacuates his crew aboard the salvage vessel and intends to destroy both the recovered relics and Striker's followers, but is saved at the last second by Lukkage. Ledo and Chamber pursue Striker when she targets the Gargantia. Despite living a life of sacrifice as a soldier, Ledo truly desires to survive and live with Amy. Chamber then relieves Ledo from duty and ejects him to safety before destroying Striker in a suicide attack. Some time later, Ledo has become an experienced excavator in the whalesquid territory, and is also in a relationship with Amy. In the ocean, whalesquid larvae are attached to Chamber.
14 (OVA 3)	"Far Beyond the Voyage Part 1"; Transliteration: "Meguru Kōro, Haruka Zenpen" (Japanese: めぐる航路、遥か 前編)	Daishirō Tanimura	September 27, 2014
Six month have passed since Striker and Chamber battled. The fleet of Kugel has merged with Gargantia and Ledo is a salvager. He uncovers more records from a past civilization. He talks with Reema about his past life on Gargantia.
15 (OVA 4)	"Far Beyond the Voyage Part 2"; Transliteration: "Meguru Kōro, Haruka Kōhen" (Japanese: めぐる航路、遥か 後編)	Daishirō Tanimura	April 4, 2015
Ledo learns that what he salvaged included information about a robot like Chamber. Other inhabitants have uncovered something and want Ledo's assistance, even if it means the destruction of Gargantia itself.

== Related media ==
=== Novels ===
Starting a few months before the series aired, the official website began updating on a monthly basis to include short stories that further expand on the Gargantia universe. On April 3, 2015, at an event in Tokyo, Bandai Visual revealed that a sequel for the anime was planned, but due to "various circumstances", was scrapped. The sequel would instead be published as two novels, titled Suisei no Gargantia ~Haruka, Kaigō no Tenchi~ (翠星のガルガンティア ～遥か、邂逅の天地～, "Gargantia on the Verdurous Planet: Far Beyond the Chance Meeting of Heaven and Earth"), which were published on August 29, 2015, and March 30, 2016, in Japan.

=== Manga ===
Gargantia on the Verdurous Planet received a manga adaptation, drawn by Wataru Mitogawa. The series' serialization began in the 17th issue of Kadokawa Shoten's Newtype Ace magazine, released on January 10, 2013, and after the magazine's final issue, July 10, 2013, it continued in Niconico's Kadokawa Niconico Ace web magazine. The manga has also been collected in three tankōbon volumes, published between April 8, 2013, and March 7, 2014. A spin-off manga series, titled Gargantia on the Verdurous Planet: Mizuhana no Bellows (翠星のガルガンティア 水端のベローズ; lit. 'The Headwaters' Bellows'), drawn by Shū with story assistance by Hiroki Uchida, began serialization in Enterbrain's Famitsu Comic Clear website on June 7, 2013. and ended on January 30, 2015. The series has been collected in two tankōbon volumes.

== Reception ==
In April 2014, the series was nominated for the Seiun Award.

The Encyclopedia of Science Fiction described Gargantia on the Verdurous Planet as an impressive, thoughtful and visually attractive anime, highlighting its exploration of the contrast between militaristic indoctrination and a society based on cooperation and coexistence. It particularly emphasized protagonist Ledo's gradual rejection of the totalitarian and eugenic ideology of the Galactic Alliance as he adapts to the more peaceful culture of Gargantia. The encyclopedia also noted the series' treatment of posthumanism, particularly the revelation that the supposedly alien Hideauze are descendants of genetically modified humans, challenging the justification for their extermination. It highlighted the contrast between the two artificial intelligences: Chamber, which ultimately sacrifices itself to protect humanity, and Striker, which establishes a religious dictatorship. The review also noted writer Gen Urobuchi's stated intention to empower young adults entering a society shaped by older generations.
