= Fullmetal Alchemist: The Sacred Star of Milos =

- Theatrical release poster
- Kanji: 鋼の錬金術師 嘆きの丘(ミロス)の聖なる星
- Revised Hepburn: Hagane no Renkinjutsushi: Mirosu no Sei-naru Hoshi
- Directed by: Kazuya Murata
- Screenplay by: Yuichi Shinbo
- Based on: Fullmetal Alchemist by Hiromu Arakawa
- Produced by: Masahiko Minami; Hirō Maruyama; Ryo Ōyama; Nobuyuki Kurashige; Fumi Teranishi; Arimasa Okada; Shin Furukawa
- Starring: Romi Park; Rie Kugimiya; Maaya Sakamoto; Toshiyuki Morikawa; Sakiko Tamagawa; Shin-ichiro Miki; Fumiko Orikasa; Megumi Takamoto; Kenji Utsumi
- Cinematography: Yoshiyuki Takei
- Edited by: Kumiko Sakamoto
- Music by: Taro Iwashiro
- Production company: Bones
- Distributed by: Shochiku
- Release dates: May 2, 2011 (Tokyo); July 2, 2011 (Japan)
- Running time: 111 minutes
- Country: Japan
- Language: Japanese
- Box office: $7,579,282

Fullmetal Alchemist: The Sacred Star of Milos (Japanese: 鋼の錬金術師 嘆きの丘(ミロス)の聖なる星, Hepburn: Hagane no Renkinjutsushi: Mirosu no Sei-naru Hoshi) is a 2011 Japanese animated fantasy action film based on Hiromu Arakawa's manga series Fullmetal Alchemist. The film was first announced, after the success of the anime television series adaptation Fullmetal Alchemist: Brotherhood. The film premiered on July 2, 2011. Those who attended it received an exclusive manga volume titled Fullmetal Alchemist Volume 11.5 ~Tabidachi no Mae ni~ (Before Embarking on the Journey).

Funimation has licensed the film and released it in the United States in 2012. The film was distributed by Eleven Arts for North America, showing at more than 100 theaters. In the UK, Manga Entertainment screened the film at BFI South Bank on June 8, 2012, followed by a home video release on September 3, 2012.

== Plot ==
The Elric brothers, Edward and Alphonse, pursue escaped convict Melvin Voyager, but he flees. The two later learn Melvin escaped with two months remaining of his five-year sentence. Among his belongings, they find a cut newspaper page with a piece cut off, and comparing with an intact copy of the same page, they find the missing piece is a photo of Julia Crichton, who was arrested for illegally entering the remote Table City, set in the border between Amestris and Creta.

Intrigued by the alchemy used by Melvin and his connection with Julia, the Elrics travel to Table City to investigate further, but a wolf Chimera takes control of the locomotive. While the two try retaking the train's control, flying soldiers called the Black Bats attempt to rescue what they think are ordinary citizens, but they retreat after finding out the prisoners were Amestrians posing as prisoners as a trap. Meanwhile, Melvin escapes the train only to be pursued by the Elrics; the two arrive at a prison, where Melvin destroyed the prison walls to find Julia. Melvin attempts to retrieve Julia, but as Miranda, the Black Bats' leader, who also tries to rescue Julia. Julia and Al fall into the Valley, a village in a vast chasm surrounding Table City, where Melvin follows and reveals his true identity as Ashleigh. While searching of Alphonse, Ed learns that Table City was originally the Hill of Milos, until Creta and later Amestris invaded the city and occupied it, forcing the Milosians to live in The Valley, in poverty.

Inside the Black Bats' secret base, Julia and Alphonse develop a friendship while Julia learns about Al and Ed's tragic past of human transmutation. Later, when Ed meets up with Al in the Black Bats base, they find themselves hunted down by wolf chimeras from the Cretan secret police dispatched by Colonel Herschel, the Cretan commander of the area, prompting them to retreat further. They and the Elrics arrive in a room with maps and locations of Table City, where Miranda explains to the Elrics their mission: to reclaim Milos by using the Sanguine Star to control a powerful heat source called Magma. Miranda also explains that the Sanguine Star was a 'red glowing stone of power'. Shocked by the description, the Elrics reveal that the Star might be a Philosopher's Stone, which requires human sacrifice to create. Though shocked at the revelation, Julia is determined to do anything to secure the Milosians' freedom, and Ashleigh agrees to help her.

Wanting to avoid a bloody war, Ed and Al return to Table City in an attempt to find the Star and destroy it. Later that night, the Black Bats begin their assault on Table City. Miranda, Ashleigh, and Julia then venture to the main tower, where, Ashleigh fatally injures Miranda and explains to Julia that the use of Miranda's blood activates a three dimensional transmutation circle drawn in blood to create the Sanguine Star. Julia then realizes that he is an impostor, Security Chief Atlas, who was enveloped by alchemy's potential of creation and power and killed Julia's parents for it. He explains that he tore off the real Ashleigh's face and the skin from his lower left side to deceive Julia and create the Star. Ed and Al arrive to rescue Julia and confront Atlas, who escapes to the location of the Star. As Ed, Al, and Julia pursue Atlas, Herschel detonates a Cretan thermal power plant, pouring out a massive amount of lava towards the Valley. Al goes to help save the valley while Ed and Julia go after Atlas. Atlas nearly attempts to retrieve the Star, only to be confronted by Ed and Julia. Julia retrieves the star and decides to save the Valley by swallowing it to use its power.

Later, Julia helps Alphonse stop the lava. Atlas arrives to take back the Star, only to be confronted by Colonel Herschel, who reveals himself to be the real Ashleigh Crichton. He survived by swallowing a Star and using its power to heal his wounds. Ashleigh then kills Atlas in revenge for the death of his parents. Confirming his identity to Julia while apologizing for leaving her alone for so long to keep her safe from Atlas, Ashleigh tells Julia to come with him to Creta so they can make a world that no one had ever seen before. Julia refuses and decides to fight her brother, with Ed and Mustang arriving to provide assistance. Julia ends the fight by destroying one of Ashleigh's arms. Then, together with Ed and Al, she manages to stop the flow of magma into the Valley. With the Valley safe, Julia uses the rest of her power to heal Ashleigh, restoring his face and saving his life. However, both Ashleigh and Julia's Stars disintegrate, and Julia sacrifices her left leg and glimpses the Gate of Truth. Meanwhile, on the Cretan side of the border, Milosian resistance fighters seize Creta's main base and declare independence. Without Colonel Herschel to lead them, the Cretan forces retreat.

The next day, Ashleigh wakes up in a hospital bed alongside Julia and is surprised to find his face restored. When Julia wakes up, she is informed that Ashleigh had already left, and is given an automail leg. She then meets Ed and Al as they prepare to leave Table City. Ed chastises Julia, saying that her decision to use the Star was wrong, but he does not think she is a bad person. Al promises to Julia that after he and his brother get their bodies back, they will be sure to visit. Julia tells them she will be waiting, as she must stay to lead the Milosians and preserve their newfound independence. Meanwhile, Ashleigh is seen donning his Cretan uniform and returning to Creta. Ed and Al then board a train to Central and take one last look at Table City before leaving.

== Voice cast ==
Character
Character	Japanese	English
Edward Elric	Romi Park	Vic Mignogna
Alphonse Elric	Rie Kugimiya	Maxey Whitehead
Julia Crichton	Maaya Sakamoto	Alexis Tipton
Melvin Voyager / Atlas	Toshiyuki Morikawa	Matthew Mercer
Miranda	Sakiko Tamagawa	Shelley Calene-Black
Roy Mustang	Shin-ichiro Miki	Travis Willingham
Riza Hawkeye	Fumiko Orikasa	Colleen Clinkenbeard
Winry Rockbell	Megumi Takamoto	Caitlin Glass
Alex Louis Armstrong	Kenji Utsumi	Christopher Sabat
Ashleigh Crichton / Herschel	Hidenobu Kiuchi, Ryohei Kimura (young)	Patrick Seitz, Micah Solusod (young)
Gonzales	Yukimasa Kishino	Bruce DuBose
Peter Soyuz	Hideyuki Umezu	Christopher Corey Smith

== New characters ==
Julia Crichton (ジュリア・クライトン, Juria Kuraiton)
Voiced by: Maaya Sakamoto (Japanese); Alexis Tipton (English)
She comes from a family of alchemists from Creta, a country on the western border of Amestris, and uses a form of alchemy the Elric brothers are unfamiliar with, allowing her to heal injuries. She was taken in as a child by the residents of Milos, a slum located at the bottom of the trench separating Amestris and Creta, and occupied by Cretan survivors of the skirmish between countries, after her parents were branded as traitors of her country and killed and her brother Ashleigh disappearing. As a member of Milos's resistance against the Amestrian-occupied Table City, she believes the only way to achieve victory is by harnessing the power of the Philosopher's Stone, which she uses to protect Milos from Atlas, a villain posing as her missing brother, and later from her own power-mad brother himself. She uses the rest of the stone's power to save her brother from death by opening the Gate of Truth at the cost of her left leg.
Melvin Voyager (メルビン・ボイジャー, Merubin Boijā)
Voiced by: Toshiyuki Morikawa (Japanese); Matt Mercer (English)
An escaped alchemist who claims to be Julia's long-lost brother Ashleigh. He uses the same form of alchemy Julia practices, which he uses to crystallize water into snow. He is revealed later in the film to be an impostor named Atlas (アトラス, Atorasu), a former guard of the Crichton family, who murdered the real Ashleigh and Julia's parents and disguised himself as Ashleigh by grafting his face onto his own. He serves as the film's primary antagonist, using Julia to help create a Philosopher's Stone so he can keep it for himself. He is killed at the film's climax by the real Ashleigh.
Herschel (ハーシェル, Hāsheru)
Voiced by: Hidenobu Kiuchi, Ryohei Kimura (young) (Japanese); Patrick Seitz, Micah Solusod (young) (English)
The commanding officer of the Cretan army stationed at the border between Table City and Milos. He wears a white mask that conceals his disfigured face. He is revealed at the climax of the film to be the real Ashleigh Crichton (アシュレー・クライトン, Ashurē Kuraiton), Julia's long-lost older brother, who survived being attacked by Atlas using a Philosopher's Stone kept by his parents. He commands wolf chimeras to search for Julia, and kills Atlas out of revenge for their (Ashleigh and Julia's) parents' murder. However, he also tries to destroy Milos out of bitterness for the city's betrayal of his family, which brings him into conflict with Julia. After he is defeated, Julia saves his life and heals his face by opening the Gate of Truth. After recovering, he leaves the newly established nation of Milos to return to Creta.
Miranda (ミランダ)
Voiced by: Sakiko Tamagawa (Japanese); Shelley Calene-Black (English)
A commander of the Black Bats, the rebel faction from Milos that aims to reclaim Table City from its Amestrian occupants. She is killed by Atlas, who uses her blood to help activate the transmutation circle beneath Table City designed to create the Philosopher's Stone.

== Development ==
The idea to create a Fullmetal Alchemist movie set during the second anime's storyline came from the series's producers. The movie's original plot was written by Yuichi Shinbo who also came up with the new characters' names. From there, director Kazuya Murata did research on Spain to develop Table City, intended as a contrast to Amestris, which was based on Germany. Because it was the only time in the series that the main characters traveled to another country, Murata had difficulties concluding it, wondering if it would affect the overarching storyline. Therefore, the story was set during the time Edward realized Alphonse's human body existed somewhere, with the logic that knowledge would encourage him to travel to another area to do research. (This likely places the events of the film somewhere around episode 21 of Brotherhood. Alphonse has learned to transmute with only his hands, but Mustang's subordinates have not yet been split up, definitively placing it somewhere between episodes 15 and 24.) Hiromu Arakawa was not included as part of the staff but was still looking forward to the film.

=== Music ===
The official theme song for the movie is "Good Luck My Way" by L'Arc-en-Ciel, which plays over the film's ending credits. The song is the band's fourth contribution to the franchise. On May 30, 2011, singer-songwriter miwa confirmed that she would sing for the opening credits theme, titled "Chasing Hearts".

=== Specials ===
To mark the July 2 opening of the Fullmetal Alchemist: The Sacred Star of Milos film, the Pia Eiga Seikatsu website posted an exclusive video "interview" with the stars of the film, Edward and Alphonse Elric (as voiced by Romi Park and Rie Kugimiya, respectively). In keeping with the spirit of Hiromu Arakawa's original manga and the two anime television series, the interviewer has trouble early on in figuring out who the "Fullmetal Alchemist" is. (The interview has cameos by the other stars of the anime.) Also includes 3 "Study" sessions with "Professor" Mustang, teaching Winry and Hawkeye about Creta and Milos.

== Release ==
The film debuted in North America at the 2011 anime convention Otakon held at the Baltimore Convention Center on July 30. Funimation, in coordination with Aniplex, subtitled the film and held the premiere it the United States only four weeks after the theatrical release in Japan. Funimation licensed the film for the North American market and subsequently provided a limited theatrical release in the United States in early 2012; a home-video release on DVD and Blu-Ray followed.

Funimation's license for the film expired on November 21, 2018.

== Reception ==
=== Box office ===
In its first weekend, Fullmetal Alchemist: The Sacred Star of Milos earned $1,791,646 despite being exhibited in only 90 screens across Japan, ranking #4 in overall revenue. The film went on to gross $7,401,480 in Japan by the end of 2011. The film also grossed $177,802 in the United States in 2012, bringing the film's total gross to $7,579,282.

=== Critical response ===
Based on 12 reviews on review aggregator website Rotten Tomatoes, 83% of critics have given the film a positive review, with an average rating of 6.4/10. It also received a weighted average score of 54 out of 100 on Metacritic based on 7 critics, denoting "mixed or average reviews".

Variety's Richard Kuipers said the film "upholds the series' trademark use of pacey action and well-defined characters struggling against oppression and seeking answers to spiritual questions." Andy Webster of The New York Times wrote, "early steampunk flavorings, including the Black Bats... have charm. And the widescreen canvas is an improvement over television's limited expanse. But if you're not among the indoctrinated, don't bother." The San Francisco Chronicle's David Lewis gave the film 3/4 stars, saying, "At a few points, the narrative becomes bewildering if you have not followed the story from the beginning, although the filmmakers take great pains to include as much backstory as possible without slowing down the proceedings. For the most part, they succeed. This is a very intelligent, well-plotted story – and my hunch is that we have not seen the last of our heroes."

=== Accolades ===
The film won three awards at the Burbank International Film Festival, which hosted the West Coast premiere of the film. It won awards for each of the three categories it was nominated in.

Year	Name of Competition	Category	Result
2011	Burbank International Film Festival	Best Feature (Animation)	Won
2011	Burbank International Film Festival	Best Writing (Animation / Adaptation)	Won
2011	Burbank International Film Festival	Best Director (Animation)	Won
