= Like Someone in Love (film) =

2012 film by Abbas Kiarostami

- Japanese theatrical release poster
- Directed by: Abbas Kiarostami
- Written by: Abbas Kiarostami
- Produced by: Marin Karmitz; Kenzo Horikoshi
- Starring: Tadashi Okuno; Rin Takanashi; Ryō Kase
- Cinematography: Katsumi Yanagishima
- Edited by: Bahman Kiarostami
- Production companies: MK2; Eurospace
- Distributed by: Eurospace (Japan); MK2 Diffusion (France)
- Release dates: May 20, 2012 (Cannes); September 15, 2012 (Japan); October 10, 2012 (France)
- Running time: 109 minutes
- Countries: Japan; France
- Language: Japanese
- Budget: US$4.8 million
- Box office: $562,878

Like Someone in Love (Japanese: ライク・サムワン・イン・ラブ, Hepburn: Raiku samuwan in rabu) is a 2012 drama film written and directed by Iranian director Abbas Kiarostami, starring Tadashi Okuno, Rin Takanashi and Ryō Kase. A co-production between Japan and France, the film centers on the unusual bond between an elderly retired professor and a young student moonlighting as a high-class prostitute, while the latter is dealing with her jealous boyfriend.

The film had its world premiere at the 2012 Cannes Film Festival, where it competed for the Palme d'Or. It was Kiarostami's final film to be released in his lifetime before his death in 2016.

== Plot ==
In Tokyo, Akiko is a sociology student who moonlights as a high-end prostitute. Her jealous and overbearing boyfriend, Noriaki, is suspicious despite not knowing what she does for a living.

One night, Akiko's pimp Hiroshi persuades her to meet an important client in Yokohama, though she has to study for an exam she is taking the next day and wishes to meet with her grandmother, who has come to Tokyo for a surprise one-day visit. During the taxi ride, Akiko listens to voicemails from her grandmother, who has been waiting all day to be picked up at a train station. Spotting her grandmother waiting beside a statue in a square outside the station, Akiko tearfully instructs the driver to circle the square twice before continuing on their journey. Akiko eventually arrives at the apartment of the client, Takashi, an elderly, retired university professor who is more interested in conversation and making her dinner than having sex.

The next morning, Takashi drives Akiko to school for her exam. While waiting in the car for her, he witnesses Noriaki accosting Akiko before she walks inside. Noriaki then spots Takashi and, assuming he is Akiko's grandfather, asks permission to marry her. Takashi does not correct his assumption and assures him he is not ready for marriage. After Akiko's exam, the three drive towards a bookstore. Noriaki diagnoses a problem with the car and convinces Takashi to drive it to the auto shop he owns, where he replaces a fan belt. There, they encounter one of Takashi's former students; Akiko worries he will reveal the truth to Noriaki.

Takashi tells Akiko she can call him if she needs and drops her off at the bookstore before returning home. Soon afterwards, he receives a panicked phone call from Akiko and returns to the bookstore to pick her up. Her mouth is bloodied, but she does not say why. Takashi takes Akiko to his apartment. Noriaki arrives, threatening them over the intercom and banging on the door. Takashi peers out his window to see what Noriaki is doing. An object is thrown through the window and Takashi falls to the floor.

== Cast ==
- Rin Takanashi as Akiko
- Tadashi Okuno as Takashi
- Ryo Kase as Noriaki
- Denden as Hiroshi
- Mihoko Suzuki as the neighbor
- Kaneko Kubota as Akiko's grandmother
- Hiroyuki Kishi as Takashi's former student
- Reiko Mori as Nagisa
- Kōichi Ōhori as the taxi driver
- Tomoaki Tatsumi as the mechanic
- Seina Kasugai as Nagisa's friend

== Production ==
Like Someone in Love is a co-production between France's MK2 Group and Japan's Eurospace. It had a budget of US$4.8 million. Filming was originally planned for April 2011, but had to be rescheduled due to the 2011 Tōhoku earthquake and tsunami. The film was eventually shot over eight weeks in October 2011. It was shot on location in Tokyo and Yokohama.

The film's initial production title was The End. It was Kiarostami's second feature film shot entirely outside his native Iran, following Certified Copy (2010) which was shot in Italy in 2009.

== Reception ==
=== Critical response ===
Like Someone in Love received mostly positive reviews by critics. On the review aggregator website Rotten Tomatoes, the film holds an approval rating of 83% based on 99 reviews, with an average rating of 7.3/10. The website's critics consensus reads: "In his second film outside his native Iran, director Abbas Kiarostami maintains the mysterious, reflective mood of previous triumphs." Metacritic, which uses a weighted average, assigned the film a score of 76 out of 100, based on 31 critics, indicating "generally favorable" reviews..

David Denby of The New Yorker wrote, "This story, driven by undercurrents and oblique hints, is almost surprising in its circumspection." He added, "The cinematography is clear and hard-focussed, and the editing produces long, flowing passages. This exquisitely made, elusive film has a lulling rhythm and a melancholy charm."

=== Accolades ===
Award	Year	Category	Recipient	Result
Cannes Film Festival	2012	Palme d'Or	Abbas Kiarostami	Nominated
Chicago International Film Festival	2012	Best International Feature	Abbas Kiarostami	Nominated
Asian Film Awards	2013	Best Director	Abbas Kiarostami	Nominated
Asian Film Awards	2013	Best Supporting Actor	Ryo Kase	Nominated
Asian Film Awards	2013	Best Cinematographer	Katsumi Yanagijima	Nominated
