= Taro Iwashiro =

Japanese composer (born 1965)

Taro Iwashiro (岩代 太郎, Iwashiro Tarō; born May 1, 1965, in Tokyo) is a Japanese composer.

== Career ==
Iwashiro has composed the music for many Japanese television series and films. He has composed for both Red Cliff films, Shinobi: Heart Under Blade, Azumi, The Prince of Tennis, Rurouni Kenshin: The Motion Picture, and the Korean film Memories of Murder. He was also lead composer for the Capcom video game Onimusha 2: Samurai's Destiny. Iwashiro has often led the Tokyo Metropolitan Symphony Orchestra for his soundtracks, including the 2005 taiga drama Yoshitsune and 2008 film Red Cliff.

He also composed music for two video games: I Will: The Story of London (1993) and the opening song for Breath of Fire IV (2000).

== Filmography ==
- Rurouni Kenshin: The Motion Picture (1997)
- The Dog of Flanders (1997)
- Aoi Tokugawa Sandai (2000)
- Memories of Murder (2003)
- Spring Snow (2005)
- Sinking of Japan (2006)
- Red Cliff (2008)
- Shodo Girls (2010)
- Fullmetal Alchemist: The Sacred Star of Milos (2011)
- Rengō Kantai Shirei Chōkan: Yamamoto Isoroku (2011)
- Our Homeland (2012)
- Ask This of Rikyu (2013)
- Gargantia on the Verdurous Planet (2013)
- Unforgiven (2013)
- Kiki's Delivery Service (2014)
- The Crossing (2014)
- The Heroic Legend of Arslan (2015)
- Kado: The Right Answer (2017)
- A.I.C.O. -Incarnation-
- Manhunt (2017)
- Uma Musume Pretty Derby (2018)
- Aircraft Carrier Ibuki (2019)
- The Journalist (2019)
- Fukushima 50 (2020)
- Mother (2020)
- A Family Separation from the Underworld (2021)
- It's a Flickering Life (2021)
- Unlock Your Heart (2021)
- Prior Convictions (2022)
- The Moon (2023)
- Kubi (2023)
- Yasuko, Songs of Days Past (2025)
- A Light in the Harbor (2025)
