= Kazuya Murata (director) =

Japanese film director

- 村田和也
- Born: Kazuya Murata; 1964 (age 61–62); Osaka
- Occupations: Director, storyboard artist, and producer

Kazuya Murata (村田和也, Murata Kazuya; born in Osaka, 1964) is a director, storyboard artist, and producer.

== Filmography ==
=== Anime television ===
- Ocean Waves (1993), Assistant Unit Director
- Yaiba (1993), Director, Storyboard, Assistant Director
- Wedding Peach (1995), Storyboard
- The Doraemons (1995), Image Board
- Berserk (1997), Assistant Director, Storyboard
- White Reflection (Two-Mix PV, 1997), Director, Storyboard
- The Adventures of Mini-Goddess (1998), Storyboard
- To Heart (1999), Storyboard, Unit Director
- Steel Angel Kurumi (1999), Storyboard, Episode Director
- Figure 17 (2001), Storyboard, Episode Director
- Pokémon Chronicles (2002), Storyboard
- Planetes (2003), Storyboard, Episode Director, Key Animation
- Mars Daybreak (2004), Storyboard, Episode Director
- Eureka Seven (2005), Storyboard, Episode Director
- Code Geass: Lelouch of the Rebellion (2006), Storyboard, Episode Director, Associate Director
- Dennō Coil (2007), Storyboard
- Code Geass: Lelouch of the Rebellion R2 (2008), Storyboard, Episode Director, Associate Director, Key Animation
- Tokyo Magnitude 8.0 (2009), Script Cooperation, Series Composition Cooperation
- Gargantia on the Verdurous Planet (2013), Director, Storyboard, Episode Director, Unit Director, Original Concept
- BBK/BRNK (2016), Storyboard
- Kado: The Right Answer (2017), General Director
- Blade Runner: Black Lotus (2022), Storyboard

=== Movies ===
- Only Yesterday (1991 film) (1991), Assistant director
- Porco Rosso (1992), Production Committee
- Baddo batsu maru no ore no pochi wa sekaiichi (1996), Storyboard, Production
- Pokémon: The First Movie (1998), Scene Planning Assistant
- Pokémon 3: The Movie (2000), Unit Director assistant
- Pokémon: Jirachi Wish Maker (2003), Assistant Director, Production
- Fullmetal Alchemist: The Sacred Star of Milos (2011), Director

=== OVA ===
- Ogre Slayer (1994), Storyboard, Production
- Makeruna! Ma kendō (1995), Director
- Gunsmith Cats (1995), Production
- Mobile Suit Gundam Unicorn episodes 2 & 3 (2010, 2011), Storyboard, Production

=== Web animation ===
- Xam'd: Lost Memories (2008), Storyboard
- A.I.C.O. -Incarnation- (2018), Director

=== Video games ===
- Shenmue II (2000), Movie director in the game
- Fullmetal Alchemist: Prince of the Dawn (2009), Storyboard in the movie
