= Ryo Kase =

Japanese actor (born 1974)

- 加瀬 亮
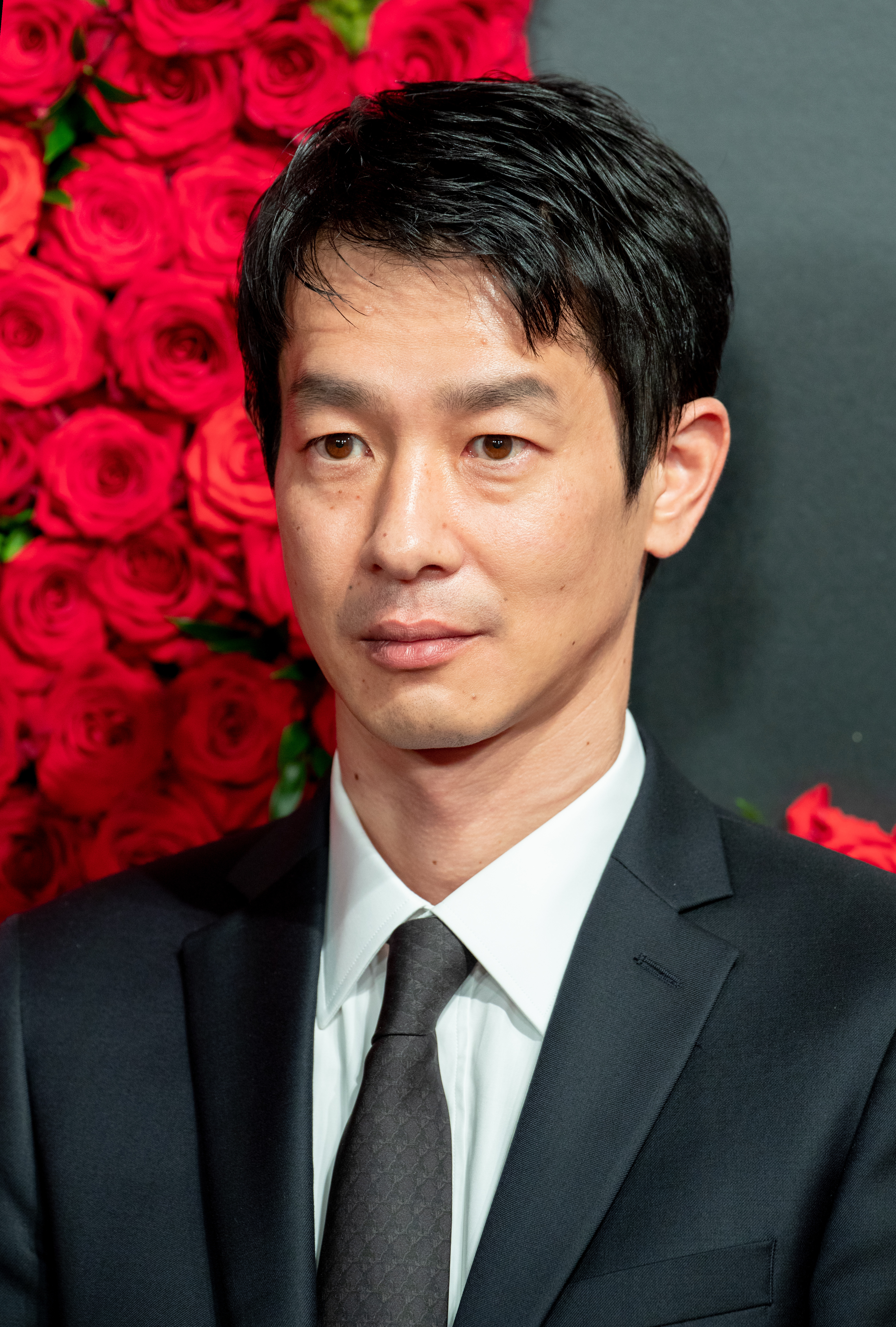
- Kase at the Tokyo International Film Festival in 2018
- Born: November 9, 1974 (age 51); Yokohama, Kanagawa Prefecture, Japan
- Occupation: Actor
- Years active: 2000–present
- Agent: Ryo Kase Office
- Known for: Letters from Iwo Jima; Hill of Freedom; Outrage; Like Someone in Love; Restless; Silence
- Website: ryokaseoffice.com

Ryo Kase (加瀬 亮, Kase Ryō; born November 9, 1974 in Yokohama) is a Japanese actor.

== Early life ==
Kase was born in Yokohama, Kanagawa prefecture. His family moved to Bellevue, Washington, in the United States soon after his birth due to his father's job being transferred; they lived there until he was seven. His father Yutaka Kase, was former chairman and representative director of Sojitz, a major Japanese general trading company.

== Career ==
Kase made his screen debut in Sogo Ishii's Gojoe: Spirit War Chronicle in 2000.

That same year, Kase received his major break when he starred in the critically acclaimed film I Just Didn't Do It (2007), directed by Masayuki Suo, for which he won the Best Actor Award at the 31st Japan Academy Prize and the 2nd Asia Film Award, among other domestic and international film awards.

In 2010, Kase played a yakuza mobster in Takeshi Kitano's highly anticipated return to the crime genre Outrage (アウトレイジ, Autoreiji) which competed for the Palme d'Or at the 2010 Cannes Film Festival. The film was a major success, grossing 634 million yen at the Japan Box office, leading to two sequels.

In 2023, Kase reunited with Takeshi Kitano in the Japanese film Kubi about the Honnō-ji Incident. In the film, Kase portrayed the historical figure, Oda Nobunaga, a charismatic military leader revered and feared as a demon king in Japan. His wildly mad-like performance was highly praised by many journalists at the Cannes Film Festival. In Japan, this portrayal of Nobunaga, which diverges greatly from his public image of being cold yet violent but also deeply human and virtuous, has sparked debate. Some audience members felt that the character setting demeaned the historical figure, while others believed the acting was so realistic it seemed to overwrite the actual image of Nobunaga himself. When director Takeshi Kitano shared this original idea with the late director Akira Kurosawa, he was told that if Kitano were to make it, it could become a masterpiece on par with Seven Samurai. This work won several awards at the 47th Japan Academy Prize, including Excellence in Cinematography, Excellence in Lighting, Excellence in Art Direction, Excellence in Sound Recording, and Excellence in Editing. Ryo Kase, who played Nobunaga, also won the award for Excellent Supporting Actor.

=== International Films ===
From the beginning of his career, Kase took advantage of his English fluency and participated in international films from various countries in Asia, Europe, and America.

His first American film was Letters from Iwo Jima (2006) directed by Clint Eastwood, where he delicately portrayed a complex character of a former military policeman turned young soldier. He made his Cannes Film Festival debut with Abbas Kiarostami's Like Someone in Love (2012). He has also appeared in Michel Gondry's Tokyo! (2008), Gus Van Sant's Restless (2011) with Mia Wasikowska, Hong Sang-soo's Hill of Freedom (2014), and Martin Scorsese's Silence (2016). In Paul Weitz's Bel Canto, he starred alongside Julianne Moore and Ken Watanabe. In the film Minamata, inspired by a photo collection of Japan's pollution lawsuit taken by the late photographer Eugene Smith, he co-starred with Johnny Depp and Hiroyuki Sanada. In 2014, when Hong Sang-soo's Hill of Freedom was released, he was selected as the Best Actor by CINE21, a Korean film magazine, despite being a foreigner. In Kiyoshi Kurosawa's To the Ends of the Earth (2019), he won the Best Supporting Actor award at the 14th Asia Film Awards.

== Filmography ==
=== Film ===
Year	Title	Role	Notes	Ref.
2000	Gojoe: Spirit War Chronicle	Kamuro		
2001	Misuzu	Masasuke		
2001	Hush!	Soba-ya cashier		
2001	Godzilla, Mothra and King Ghidorah: Giant Monsters All-Out Attack	Fisher		
2002	Rock'n'Roll Mishin	Kenji Hamada		
2003	Bright Future	Fuyuki Arita		
2003	When the Last Sword Is Drawn	Shohei Kondo		
2003	Kakuto	Shinji		
2004	Cutie Honey	Todoroki		
2004	69	Ryo Otaki		
2004	The Taste of Tea	Rokutaro Hamadayama		
2004	Nobody Knows	Mini-market employee		
2005	Break Throughi!	Hideto Noguchi		
2005	Female	Man	Segment "Tamamushi"	
2005	About Love	Tecchan	Segment "Taipei"	
2005	Scrap Heaven	Police officer Shingo		
2005	The Passenger	Akira		
2005	Custom Made 10.30	Probationer angel "Jeff"		
2005	Dead Run	Yuji Miyahara		
2005	Su-ki-da			
2006	Funky Forest	Takefumi		
2006	Hana	Sodekichi		
2006	Honey and Clover	Takumi Mayama		
2006	Strawberry Shortcakes	Nagai		
2006	Letters from Iwo Jima	Superior Private Shimizu		
2006	Retribution	Sailor		
2007	I Just Didn't Do It	Teppei Kaneko	Lead role	
2007	Megane	Yomogi		
2008	10 Promises to My Dog	Susumu Hoshi		
2008	Gururi no koto	Tsuyoshi Tanaka		
2008	The Sky Crawlers	Yūichi Kannami (voice)		
2008	Paco and the Magical Book	Kōichi		
2008	Tokyo!	Akira	Segment "Interior Design"	
2009	Gravity's Clowns	Izumi Okuno	Lead role	
2010	Outrage	Ishihara		
2010	Sketches of Kaitan City	Haruo Meguro		
2010	About Her Brother	Akira		
2011	Restless	Hiroshi		
2012	Like Someone in Love	Noriaki		
2012	Outrage Beyond	Ishihara		
2012	SPEC: Ten	Takeru Sebumi	Lead role	
2013	It's Me It's Me	Tajima		
2013	Pecoross' Mother and Her Days	Satoru Okano		
2013	SPEC: Close	Takeru Sebumi	Lead role	
2013	Dawn of a Filmmaker	Keisuke Kinoshita	Lead role	
2014	Hill of Freedom	Mori		
2014	My Hawaiian Discovery	Tomoya Abe		
2014	Judge!			
2015	Our Little Sister	Miu Sakashita		
2015	Foujita	Kanjiro		
2016	Japanese Girls Never Die	Sawai (Policeman)		
2016	Silence	João (Chokichi)		
2017	March Comes in Like a Lion	Tōji Sōya		
2017	March Goes out Like a Lamb	Tōji Sōya		
2017	Moonlight Shimo-ochiai		Lead role	
2018	Mori, The Artist's Habitat	Takeshi Fujita		
2018	Lying to Mom	Kōichi Suzuki		
2018	Bel Canto	Gen Watanabe		
2019	To the Ends of the Earth	Iwao		
2020	Minamata	Kiyoshi		
2020	The Works and Days	Ryo Sasaki		
2023	Kubi	Oda Nobunaga		

=== Television ===
Year	Title	Role	Notes	Ref.
2010	SPEC: Birth	Takeru Sebumi	Lead role	
2012	Penance	Koji Takano	Episode 3	
2025	Anpan	Yutaro Asada	Asadora	

== Writings ==
"Minna no Ozu-kai" in Ozu Yasujiro Taizen (The Complete Book of Ozu Yasujiro) by Matsuura Kanji and Miyamoto Akiko (Asahi Shimbun Publications Inc. 2019) ISBN 9784022515995

== Bibliography ==
- Bellevue Ryo Kase (July 2006, Media Factory) ISBN 4840115591

== Awards and nominations ==
=== 2004 ===
- 14th Japan Film Professional Awards Best Actor

=== 2007 ===
- 17th Japan Film Professional Awards: Best Actor for I Just Didn't Do It
- 81st Kinema Junpo Award: Best Actor for I Just Didn't Do It
- 21st Takasaki Film Festival: Best Supporting Actor

=== 2008 ===
- 31st Japan Academy Film Prize: Best Actor (nomination) for I Just Didn't Do It
- 32nd Hochi Film Award: Best Actor for I Just Didn't Do It
- 50th Blue Ribbon Awards: Best Actor for I Just Didn't Do It
- 29th Yokohama Film Festival: Best Actor for I Just Didn't Do It
- 3rd Osaka Cinema Festival: Best Actor for I Just Didn't Do It
- 2nd Asian Film Awards: Best Actor (nomination) for I Just Didn't Do It
- 27th Zenkoku Eiren Awards: Best Actor for I Just Didn't Do It

=== 2010 ===
- 1st Nippon Theater Staff Film Festival: Best Supporting Actor

=== 2013 ===
- 67th Mainichi Film Award: Best Supporting Actor for Beyond Outrage
