= Fullmetal Alchemist: Dream Carnival =

2004 video game

- Developer: Eighting
- Publisher: Bandai
- Composers: Masaharu Iwata; Mitsuhiro Kaneda
- Series: Fullmetal Alchemist
- Engine: RenderWare
- Platform: PlayStation 2
- Release: JP: August 26, 2004
- Genre: Fighting
- Mode: Single player/Multiplayer

Fullmetal Alchemist: Dream Carnival (鋼の錬金術師ドリームカーニバル, Hagane no Renkinjutsushi: Dorīmu Kānibaru) is a PlayStation 2 fighting game based on the Japanese anime and manga series, Fullmetal Alchemist. The video game was published by Bandai and it was released on July 22, 2004, in Japan.

The game's story involves a fighting tournament during a large festival that allows for any pair of fighters to participate. The participants are allowed to use weapons and alchemical skills. The game's main characters are Edward Elric, Alphonse Elric, and Roy Mustang. The fighting involves the two versus two style of game playing. Each team shares a "star" meter which decreases each time one member of the team dies. If all the stars disappear, the battle ends.

Fullmetal Alchemist: Dream Carnival graphics have cel-shaded textures for the character models.

== Characters ==
- Alex Louis Armstrong
- Alphonse Elric
- Edward Elric
- Greed (Note: Hidden character)
- Gluttony
- Izumi Curtis
- King Bradley
- Lust
- Maes Hughes
- Riza Hawkeye
- Roy Mustang
- Scar
- Winry Rockbell
- Wrath
