= Fullmetal Alchemist: Dual Sympathy =

2005 video game

- North American cover art
- Developer: Natsume Co., Ltd.
- Publishers: JP: Bandai; NA/AUS: Destineer; EU: Empire Interactive
- Director: Youichi Arakawa
- Series: Fullmetal Alchemist
- Platform: Nintendo DS
- Release: JP: July 21, 2005; NA: December 12, 2006; AU: April 1, 2007; EU: September 7, 2007
- Genre: Action
- Mode: Single-player

Fullmetal Alchemist: Dual Sympathy (鋼の錬金術師 デュアルシンパシー, Hagane no Renkinjutsushi: Dyuaru Shinpashī) is a video game for the Nintendo DS. The game was released in Japan on July 21, 2005, two days before the first Fullmetal Alchemist movie came out, and was accompanied by a PlayStation 2 release of Fullmetal Alchemist 3: The Girl Who Succeeded God. Dual Sympathy was announced by Destineer on September 12, 2006, for release in North America during 2006. It had gone gold on November 27 and was released on December 12, 2006.

== Gameplay ==
The video game spans through the entire 51 episodes of Fullmetal Alchemist, and is a side-scrolling brawler in the vein of classic titles like Final Fight or Battletoads. Players control Edward Elric, and his brother Al will often fight alongside him. The touch screen feature of the Nintendo DS is used to draw transmutation circles for alchemy, as well as to trigger special moves, some of which are necessary to progress through the game. For example, the player may have to create stone walls to cross a bed of spikes, create weights to trap enemies inside hatches, or summon cannons to break down walls. Most boss battles also require use of alchemy in order to complete them.

Dual Sympathy also features many bonuses such as a second gameplay mode called Character Mode, which allows the player to replay the story with other characters; and also play a variety of minigames, and an alarm clock mode using voices from the series.

=== Playable characters ===
Edward Elric is the only available character in the story mode. After the game is completed, the character mode is unlocked and Alphonse Elric, Roy Mustang, Izumi Curtis, Alex Louis Armstrong, and Scar become playable.

When playing as Mustang, Riza Hawkeye accompanies the player. When playing as Armstrong, the companion is Maes Hughes. When playing as Izumi Curtis or Alphonse Elric, Edward Elric accompanies the player. When playing as Scar, it is Alphonse who accompanies him.

== Reception ==
Reception

Aggregate score
| Aggregator | Score |
|---|---|
| Metacritic | 58/100 |

Review scores
| Publication | Score |
|---|---|
| Eurogamer | 5/10 |
| Famitsu | 27/40 |
| GamesMaster | 57% |
| GameSpot | 4/10 |
| GameSpy | 3.5/5 |
| GameZone | 7/10 |
| Hardcore Gamer | 2/5 |
| IGN | 5.5/10 |
| Nintendo Power | 7/10 |
| Official Nintendo Magazine | 66% |

Fullmetal Alchemist: Dual Sympathy received "mixed" reviews according to the review aggregation website Metacritic. In Japan, Famitsu gave it a score of 27 out of 40.
