= Scar (Fullmetal Alchemist) =

Fictional character from Fullmetal Alchemist

- Fullmetal Alchemist character
- Scar in the 2003 anime series
- First appearance: Fullmetal Alchemist chapter 5, "The Alchemist's Suffering" (2001)
- Created by: Hiromu Arakawa
- Portrayed by: Mackenyu
- Voiced by: Japanese: Ryōtarō Okiayu (2003 anime); Kenta Miyake (Brotherhood); English: Dameon Clarke (2003 anime); J. Michael Tatum (OVAs and Brotherhood)

In-universe information
- Relatives: Unnamed brother (deceased)

Scar (Japanese: スカー, Hepburn: Sukā), also known as Scarred Man (傷の男, Kizu no Otoko), is a fictional character from the Fullmetal Alchemist manga series and its adaptations created by Hiromu Arakawa. Scar is introduced as a villain who targets alchemists working for the state military from the fictional country of Amestris. Scar hails from the region of Ishval whose people were almost exterminated in a previous civil war against the state military, most notably their alchemists. His alias is derived from the prominent X-shaped scar that decorates his brow with his birth name being unknown. As the series continues, Scar's backstory is further explored and he questions his motives, eventually joining the side of the Amestrian State military, assisting in an armed coup against the government in order to defeat the organization secretly responsible for the Ishvalan Civil War.

Scar was created by Arakawa in order to represent the continuous encounter that happened between people from Hokkaido and the Ainu. Therefore, she regards Scar as a complex character as his hatred spanned from the Ishval's civil war. Similarly, his character was received positively by publications from manga and anime, who find him as an atypical villain in the series.

== Creation and concept ==
The major conflict between Scar and the State Alchemists is based on Hiromu Arakawa's own background when she lived in Hokkaido, as her ancestors conquered the land belonging to the Ainu people, but some of them were Ainu themselves. This is represented in Scar's revenge against State Alchemists as he ironically uses alchemy like them in order to kill them despite being a taboo for his religion. As a result, Arakawa comments that rather than being a common "evil antagonist", Scar's character resulted from several catastrophes that occurred in the Ishvalan Civil War and therefore, such a label should be avoided. When illustrating characters, Arakawa states that Scar became one of the easiest ones to design.

== Appearances ==
=== In Fullmetal Alchemist ===
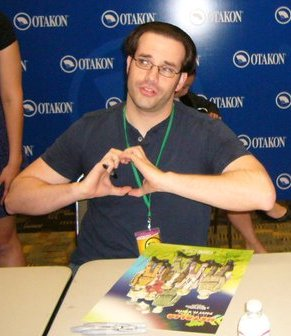
J. Michael Tatum is the second English voice of Scar, Tatum replaced Clarke following his hiatus from voicework and was experienced as he had replaced Clarke as Victor Hilsire in Gunslinger Girl.

Scar is introduced in the series as a serial killer who targets alchemists working for the state military from the country of Amestris in revenge for their involvement in the Ishvalan civil war, which caused the death of several of his comrades. During this war, a state alchemist named Solf J. Kimblee attacked Scar and his friends and family. With the last of his strength, Scar's brother attached his own arm, through means of alchemy, to Scar. This gives Scar the ability to use alchemy despite being a taboo for his people's religion, as Ishvalans believe that only God has the right to create. However, instead of fully transmuting what he comes in contact with, he simply decomposes it into individual elements, completely obliterating the object. When Scar awakens after the incident and discovers his brother's arm attached to his own, he kills the doctors treating him, Winry Rockbell's parents, in a blind rage.

Using his new ability, Scar tries to kill the state alchemist Edward Elric in Eastern Headquarters, but escapes upon being ambushed by the military. As he wanders beneath in the sewers, he is found by humanoid creatures known as homunculi. Retreating from them, Scar then joins with the former military lieutenant Yoki and a young immigrant named May Chang to go to Central City to continue his revenge. He finds the Elric brothers, unaware that it is part of their plot to lure out the homunculi. During this encounter, Edward reveals Scar's involvement in the deaths of Winry's parents, unaware that Winry is present at the time, and which Scar confirms. When Edward and his brother Alphonse try to beat him while capturing a homunculus, Scar is saved by May. He agrees to help May find her pet panda in thanks for saving him. Scar and May end up stumbling upon the Elrics in the homunculi's lair, where Edward reveals the fact that they sparked the Ishbal rebellion. As he escapes, he finds Dr. Tim Marcoh, a state alchemist who participated in the Ishbalan war, who asks Scar to kill him as he is being used by the homunculi. Scar agrees to fulfill Marcoh's wish in return for the true story behind the Ishbal Massacre. After learning the truth behind his brother's research involving alchemy, Scar decides to spare Marcoh's life to help him learn more. Scar's group makes their way to the North where the secrets of his brother's research are hidden.

During the journey, Scar continues to be the target of the state military and is ultimately captured by the Elric brothers. When they discover that Kimblee is nearby, searching for Scar, Winry proposes that she be used as a "hostage" by Scar to provide cover for the Elric brothers, and to secure herself from Central's grasp. In the end, Scar and his group, together with Winry, go through an unused mine tunnel under the city. After succeeding in their escape, Scar joins forces with the Ishbalans as well as Edward's group in order to strike on the corrupted State Military controlled by the homunculi. While attacking their base, Scar fights the homunculus King Bradley. After defeating him, a severely wounded Scar uses the last of his strength to activate the transmutation circle that the Ishbalans secretly made around the city to enhance the alchemists' powers thanks to his brother's notes and stop the homunculi's leader. Following this, General Olivier Mira Armstrong saves Scar's life in order for him to aid the military in rebuilding the Ishbalan nation. Scar agrees, deciding to give up his birthname and his nickname.

=== 2003 anime ===
In the 2003 anime, Scar has a much more younger appearance compared to his more muscular, middle-aged appearance from the manga. Additionally, his backstory is largely the same as in the manga, except Roy Mustang executed Winry Rockbell's parents on military orders during the war and Scar's brother was romantically involved with his fiancé who later died of an illness. Scar's brother became an exile for performing human transmutation to resurrect her, as alchemy in general is forbidden in Ishbal. After the sudden attack and outbreak of war, his brother came back, knowing how to create a Philosopher's Stone, but the faithful Ishbalans ignored him, and he later renounced his research. His brother had transmuted the souls of the people dying during the war into the transmutation circle before passing off the symbol to Scar himself before dying, and that the fact it is incomplete is why it absorbs red stones and how Scar can use deconstructive alchemy.

Scar's characterization and role is altered following the war in Ishbal. Targeting Edward Elric, Scar is ambushed by the military before he escapes. Upon learning that the Elrics are headed for the first branch library, Scar goes there to ambush them, but he is found by the homunculi, recognizing Lust's resemblance to his brother's deceased lover. Scar barely survives as his wounds are tended to at an Ishbalan refugee camp. When the Elrics break into the military's fifth laboratory, Scar follows them, confronting the homunculi again. In the laboratory, after seeing Edward refuse the homunculi's offer to obtain a Philosopher's Stone by killing the prisoners held within the laboratory, Scar interrupts them to give the Elrics time to escape. Scar returns to the refugee camp occupied by the remaining Ishbalans, only for it to be attacked by mercenaries posing as the State Military. After he and the Elrics save an Ishbalan child from them, they reach an uneasy truce.

Through further study, Scar eventually comes to realize the true nature of his arm as an incomplete Philosopher's Stone. Concluding that he needs the stone to stop the action of the State Military, he travels to the war-torn desert city of Lior and inscribes a gigantic transmutation circle around the city itself. Learning of his presence there, the State Military arrives in force. Once again, Edward and Scar battle, but they are interrupted by the homunculi, forcing Scar to stun Lust with his brother's lover's locket and for Gluttony to take the unconscious Lust and retreat. Upon settled down with their allies Rosé Thomas and Lyra, Scar explains his past to Edward, who in turn, explains on how homunculi are created and weaken and that Lust was definitely created by Scar's brother after he failed to revive his lover. Later, as Kimblee leads a small army of chimeras into Lior, and with the evacuation nearly complete, Scar and Alphonse engage him in combat, which ends with Scar managing to mortally wound Kimblee at the cost of his left arm. Kimblee, however, transmutes Alphonse's body into explosive material before dying. To save him, Scar transmutes his remaining arm, and all the power and souls within it, into Alphonse's armored body. Upon slightly conciliating with a gradually reformed Lust, Scar uses the last of his strength to complete and activate the transmutation circle around the city, dying as the transmutation took place, and the Philosopher's Stone is completed – within Alphonse, saving his life and killing several groups of soldiers attacking Lior.

== Reception ==
In each of the popularity polls made by Monthly Shōnen Gangan Scar has appeared within the top 20. As a result of often sharing his spot with animals and Hiromu Arakawa's alter-ego, the character has been shown angered after the end of the polls, to the point of killing Arakawa.

Critical response to Scar's character and development has generally been positive. DVD Talk writer Bobby Cooper initially noted Scar's story to be one of the series' themes against religion, but concluded that it was not as he was just using his religion to justify his murders. Todd Douglass Jr. from the same site called him "a deep character with a tragic past" as despite being a murderer, he comes to share the same points of view from the Elric brothers across the series. Holly Ellingwood from Active Anime noted Scar to be "a character so much deeper than just a foil for the brothers" [Edward and Alphonse Elric] due to how along the series it is shown his backstory and it is explained why is he determined to kill all the State Alchemists unlike other villains. Mania Entertainment's Chris Beveridge celebrated Scar's introduction in the second anime series Fullmetal Alchemist: Brotherhood, remarking that "we learn a good deal of recent history in a short time that paints a picture of exactly what's going on". While reviewing the first anime's second DVD, Sean Broestl from Anime News Network (ANN) was curious to who is such character, as he is shown in the first episodes but he is never introduced. However, he was looking forward to seeing his introduction and how he would affect the Elric brothers. His second fight against the Elric brothers in the manga and his confrontation with Winry Rockbell were praised by Sakura Eries from Mania who found the former to have its "own surprise moments" while the latter had her "on the verge of tears". Carlo Santos from ANN also praised Scar's fights in following volumes from the manga, commenting that they contain "lots of exhilarating action and creative fighting moves".
