= Winry Rockbell =

Fictional character from Fullmetal Alchemist

- Fullmetal Alchemist character
- Winry Rockbell by Hiromu Arakawa
- First appearance: Fullmetal Alchemist chapter 9, "A Home with a Family Waiting" (2002)
- Created by: Hiromu Arakawa
- Portrayed by: Tsubasa Honda
- Voiced by: Japanese; Megumi Toyoguchi (2003 series); Megumi Takamoto (Brotherhood); English; Caitlin Glass

Winry Rockbell (Japanese: ウィンリィ・ロックベル, Hepburn: Winrī Rokkuberu) is a fictional character from Hiromu Arakawa's Fullmetal Alchemist manga series and its adaptations. Winry is a teenage mechanic who often spends time with the central characters, brothers Edward and Alphonse Elric, who are childhood friends of hers. Specializing in mechanical repair, specifically prostheses called automail, Winry services Ed's replacement arm and leg.

Originally meant to be introduced in the series' first chapters due to its lack of female characters, some of Winry's traits are based on Arakawa's own life. In the first anime adaptation, Fullmetal Alchemist, Winry is voiced by Megumi Toyoguchi in Japanese and by Caitlin Glass in the English version. In the second anime adaptation, Fullmetal Alchemist: Brotherhood, she is voiced by Megumi Takamoto in Japanese, with Glass reprising the role in English. Besides being in the manga and anime series, Winry is also in the first anime's sequel film and original video animations (OVAs).

Readers of the manga have ranked her among the top ten characters in the series. Periodicals and other media for manga and anime fans have praised her for her attitude, her relationship with the Elric brothers, and her development across the manga series.

== Creation and conception ==
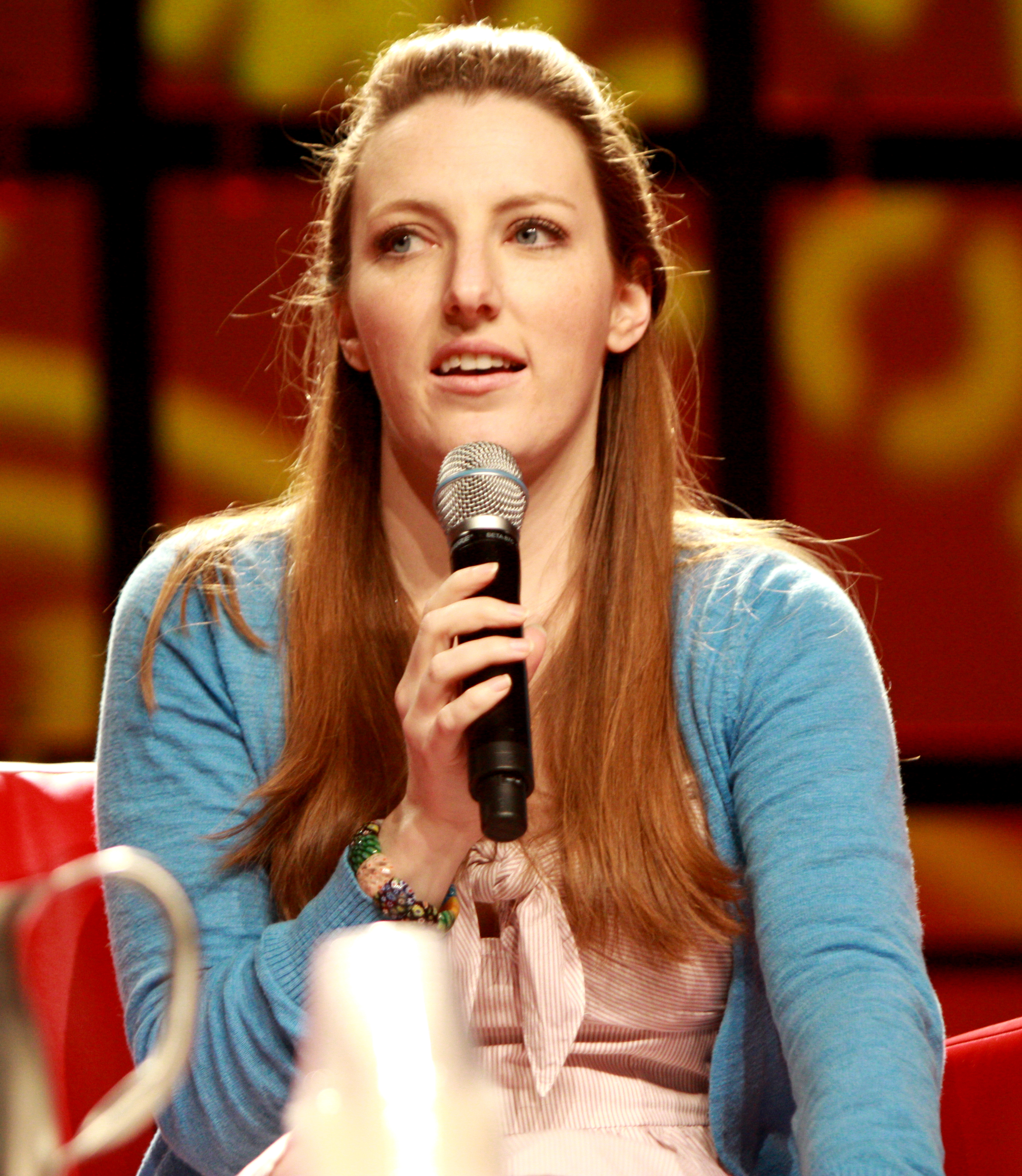
Caitlin Glass, who voices the character in English,

Hiromu Arakawa wanted to introduce Winry in Chapter 3 of the manga due to the lack of female characters in the first two chapters and because of her importance, but her editor told her it was too soon to do it. Arakawa was satisfied with her debut, considering Winry a "buffer" who helps the reader understand the Elric brothers' problems, since, although she finds it hard to talk to them, she is able to understand their feelings. Thus, Arakawa thinks Winry has the most difficult position of the three. Winry's occupation in the series was inspired by Arakawa's opinions about how people had to work hard in order to eat. Additionally, the way Winry and her grandmother Pinako welcome the Elrics into their home after the Elrics' mother's death reflected Arakawa's views on how people should react to social problems. When asked in 2006 who her favorite Fullmetal Alchemist characters are, Arakawa found it hard to decide, but at the time she picked Winry along with the Elrics and Riza Hawkeye. Arakawa has also stated that she enjoys drawing Winry immensely.

Megumi Toyoguchi voices Winry in the first Fullmetal Alchemist anime series, but Megumi Takamoto voices her in the second. In both English adaptations, Caitlin Glass wound up voicing Winry, even though she never thought to audition for the role. Glass tried out for Al, Rose, Lust, and Hawkeye; it was her audition for the character of Rose and her previous "hyper" voice in the Spiral series that won her the role, after reading only a single line of Winry's dialogue. Glass reprised her role in the second anime series.

== Appearances ==
=== In the manga ===
Winry's first appearance in the manga is when the Elric brothers return to Resembool in order to ask Winry and Pinako to create another automail for Edward's right arm after it was destroyed by the criminal Scar. Winry is portrayed in the series as kind, optimistic, and sincere, acting as a concerned and compassionate family member to the Elrics in their company. She had known Edward and Alphonse since childhood. In the story, she was orphaned at a young age when her parents were killed while serving as doctors in the Ishvalan war. She lived with her grandmother in Resembool from then on. Known as an "Automail Otaku", she is fascinated by any and all types of machines, tools, and excels in building and repairing automail. Along with her grandmother, Pinako, also a famous automail engineer, the two run a small shop out of their home. Winry is known to be an automail prodigy. They made and installed Edward's automail arm and leg after he lost his original limbs in a failed human transmutation of his mother. Winry takes it upon herself to make sure that his automail is in top form, and travels to service it when as needed. This dedication is either out of enthusiasm (due to these moments making up most of the moments she gets to be with Edward and Alphonse, as well as getting paid for each) or out of frustration (due to Edward constantly breaking his automail, which she is worried as to how Edward breaks the arm and what dangerous situations he is put in). In the first anime series, it is hinted that Winry and Edward share romantic feelings for each other, but this is never confirmed. In the manga and second anime series, Edward is unnaturally flustered by the mere thought of being romantically linked to Winry, while Winry eventually realizes that she loves Edward and has for most of her life. After three all-nighters, she forgets to add a screw to Edward's automail and so it breaks after one of his fights. Winry goes to Central City to fix Edward's automail, feeling guilty (as Edward is in the hospital as well), but quickly overcomes it when she realizes no one else has any idea about the screw. She then spends the night at the house of Maes Hughes.

While the Elrics continue their search for the Philosopher's Stone, they decide to go meet their old mentor, Izumi Curtis. Winry gets them to take her to Rush Valley, the automail capital of the world, along the way, much to their dismay. There she meets a pickpocket named Paninya. They become friends because Winry convinces her to try to earn her money honestly and helps her out and her interest in automail. Winry also meets the family of Dominic, an automail engineer, and when Dominic's daughter-in-law goes into labor, Winry successfully delivers her baby at the mere age of 15, saving the lives of both the mother and baby. She asks to be Dominic's apprentice, but is refused both because Dominic does not take apprentices and because he has an unexplained past with her grandmother, Pinako, and is terrified of her. He introduces her to another engineer named Garfiel, who happily takes her on. Some time later, Winry returns with the Elrics to Central Headquarters and finds that Hughes was murdered, leaving Winry grieving. When the Elrics confront the criminal Scar once again to get closer to the Philosopher's Stone, Winry goes there to try to help them, only to discover during the fight that Scar killed her parents during the Ishvalan War. Overcome by disbelief and grief, Winry points a gun at Scar, but Ed jumps in front of her and pins the gun down, allowing Scar to flee with Al in pursuit. Winry becomes distressed that she could not bring herself to shoot because of how he killed her innocent parents, but Ed reassures her that her hands are not meant to kill, but are meant for saving lives. After Ed delivers her to the custody of others, despite her desire to have him stay, Winry spends the rest of the day with King Bradley. After Scar escapes, Winry is urged to return to Rush Valley by her loyal customers, and Ed promises her the next time he makes her cry they will be tears of joy. After this, she realizes she has been in love with him.

After the Elrics and Roy Mustang discover Bradley is a Homunculus, Winry and Riza Hawkeye respectively are used as hostages by the military to gain their obedience. Winry later discovers that the Elrics have traveled North, and she heads there as well since Ed's automail is not suited for those conditions, in which he could die; State Alchemist Solf J. Kimblee escorts her there to emphasize her "imprisonment" and gains her trust. After Winry replaces Ed's arm, he tells her he is being forced to capture Scar for the military, but does not tell the entire truth. Winry goes with him and Al, but once they capture him, Winry helps Scar by bandaging his heavy wounds sustained in a fight with Kimblee's chimeras, as she thinks her parents would have done the same and learns that to save someone does not mean you forgive them. In order to both evade the military so she can no longer be used against the Elrics and secure freedom for her allies, she has a brilliant plan and decides to pretend to be Scar's hostage to cover her group's escape. After staying in Liore for a short time, Winry is taken on a military train back into Resembool in a water tank. When she goes into her house, she tries to change clothes, only to find Ed in her room flusteredly staring, causing her to scream before calming down and having a conversation with him, saying she has missed him since their last time together. Later that night, Winry has dinner with Granny and Ed for the first time in so long, along with several others who came with them to the household. After preparing his arm, Ed tells her to leave the country, but she promptly refuses, telling him to give it all he has and not doubt himself. Unnoticed by her is the fact that Edward is now taller than her. During the Promised Day, Winry is killed upon the activation of the Gate, her final word being "Ed", but is resurrected along with the rest of the country by Van Hohenheim. The Elrics return afterwards, where she keeps her promise by crying upon seeing their bodies restored and hugging them. Two years after the Elrics return to Resembool, the Elrics leave to research alchemy. Winry sees Ed off at the train station, whereupon he proposes to her in a clumsy, alchemy-based fashion, but she accepts regardless in an equally-awkward manner, much to Ed's amusement. It is shown that they later marry, and both are seen in the epilogue with their son and daughter. According to Chronicle Book 3, it is known that they have two children.

=== In the first anime ===
Winry's role in the first anime is largely the same as in the manga until after her and the Elrics encounter and interact with Paninya in Rush Valley. Here, Winry meets the Elrics' teacher Izumi Curtis as she drags the brothers back to her hometown Dublith with Winry accompanying them. There, Winry and the Elrics eventually learn how Izumi's stillborn son became the homunculus Wrath. Winry continues traveling with the Elrics until she learns that her parents were killed in the Ishvalan massacre by Ed's superior Roy Mustang on military orders. Winry goes to Central to meet Mustang, but she is unable to bring herself to talk with him when she hears from several people that he is highly respected by his colleagues, including the deceased Maes Hughes. Winry later meets and befriends the librarian Sheska, who suspected the woman Juliet Douglas, who is in fact the homunculus Sloth, for being responsible for Hughes' death. Both are attacked by Sloth, but she retreats when Winry recognizes her as Ed and Al's mother. Declaring that it is too dangerous to remain in Central, Winry and Sheska flee to Resembool.

Back in Resembool, Winry meets Ed and Al's estranged father, Hohenheim of Light. Once she and Sheska learn that the Elrics are accused of treason and had become fugitives, the girls head out to help them, but they are taken into custody by Mustang and his team before they manage to catch up with the Elrics. Winry de-escalates the situation when she cries out to Mustang to stop before he could further harm the Elrics, who were eventually cleared of any wrong doing and temporarily stayed with Winry, Sheska, and Pinako. When the Elrics learn of Hughes' death from Sheska, the boys try to chase after Mustang for not telling them, but Sheska and Winry restrain the Elrics, with Winry also apologizing for not telling the Elrics sooner. Having gain newfound respect for Mustang, Sheska and Winry along with Pinako help Ed understand that Mustang only hid this fact to keep the Elrics from blaming themselves and revenge is not something Hughes would have approved. Ed and Al soon set out to fight and stop the homunculi, but only Al returns as Ed finds himself in a parallel universe.

In the movie sequel, Winry learns of Izumi's death. Later, Winry and Sheska set out to find Al, who is trying to bring Ed back home. Upon Ed's return, Winry reveals she has prepared a new automail for and attaches them to him. After the Elrics are forced to leave for good, Winry continues working on automail with her grandmother.

In the OVA Kids, it is revealed that three children bare a similar resemblance to Winry, Ed, and Alphonse, along with a nearly 100-year-old Edward still living in the other world, even referencing a great-great uncle Alphonse by the children. It is believed that these children are the great-great grandchildren of Edward. Whether if he married the new world's version of Winry or the Winry (if she were to travel over somehow) from his world is unknown.

=== In other media ===
In the first 2007 OVA, a drunken Winry confronts Edward about pictures of him and Noah that appeared in a magazine featuring shots and tidbits of the movie. In a second OVA, Edward is shown as a grandfather with three grandchildren with one of them being identical to Winry. In the third OVA, Winry herself does not appear, though Envy takes on her form and is kidnapped by Greed together with Al. Winry has her own character CD named Hagaren Song File — Winry Rockbell (Hagaren Song File - ウィンリィ・ロックベル). Released on June 22, 2009, the CD features tracks based on her character performed by her Japanese voice actress in the first Fullmetal Alchemist anime series, Megumi Toyoguchi. In the 2017 live action film, Winry is portrayed by Tsubasa Honda.

== Reception ==
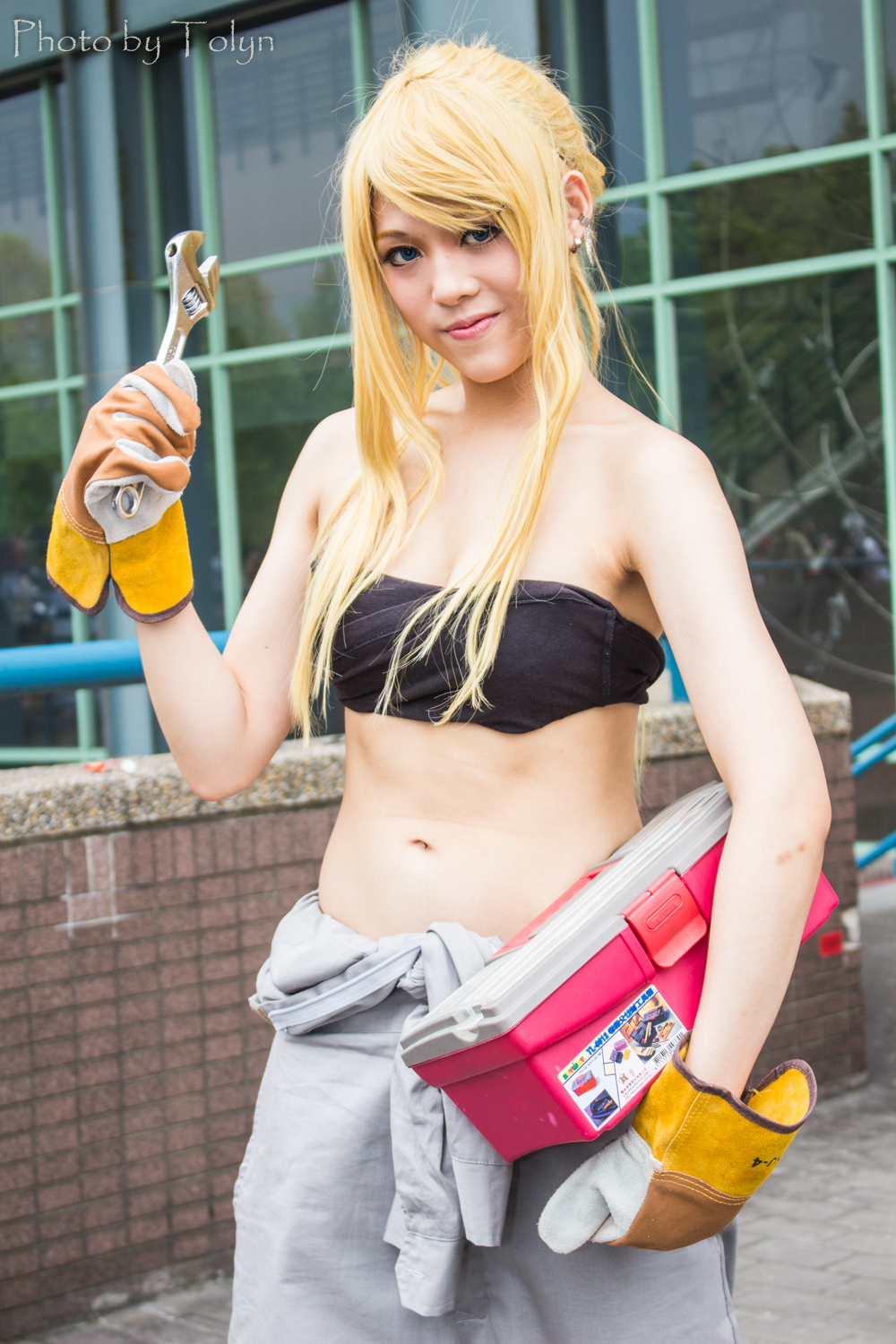
Cosplay of Winry

In popularity polls from the manga published in Square Enix's Monthly Shōnen Gangan Winry was commonly featured in the top ten, reaching fifth place in 2009. In the July 2009 issue from Newtype, Winry ranked ninth in the survey of best anime female characters. In the 2004 Animage Anime Grand Prix poll, Winry was voted as the third most popular female character. Several types of merchandising exploit based on Winry, including action figures, key-chains and patches.

Critical response to Winry's character has generally been positive. Writing for Pop Culture Shock, Lydia Hojnacki listed Winry as a female characters she likes from the Fullmetal Alchemist while commenting on her relation with the Elric brothers. Mania Entertainment's Jarred Pine liked how Winry's character is further developed in the manga than in the first anime, highlighting her first meeting with Riza Hawkeye, writing "It is such a simple scene, but it really speaks volumes about the characters." Her confrontation against Scar in the manga was praised by Sakura Eries from the same site, who was "on the verge of tears".

Holly Ellingwood, a writer for Active Anime, also praised the moment, describing it as an "emotional struggle" and noting that "her own actions afterwards are some of the most riveting of these latest chapters". Ellingwood also praised Winry's appearance in the first anime noting that her "enthusiasm for anything and everything mechanical and sheer enthusiasm is a welcome change from the dire episodes preceding her arrival." However, she was saddened that her character did not appear until later episodes as the series' focus moved to the search for the Philosopher's Stone. Similarly, Ben Moscrop from UK Anime Network found the episode in which the Elrics and Winry go to Rush Valley as it helps developing her character regarding her relationship with the Elrics to the point she "really shines through." Anime News Network's Carlo Santos praised how her appearance in the north from Amestris while meeting the Elrics brothers was a "complete game-changer" due to her status as a hostage. In retrospect, Caitlin Donovan of The Mary Sue observed that Winry's character is a major example of Arakawa's well-executed writing at female characters in mangas amed towards a male demography, citing Lailah's character arc from the following manga she wrote, Hero Tales, to be a proper successor of her.
