= List of Fullmetal Alchemist characters =

Some of the Fullmetal Alchemist characters from left to right and top to bottom: Lust, Edward, Alphonse, Armstrong, Scar, Winry, Mustang, Hawkeye, Gluttony, Izumi (with her husband Sig in the background), King Bradley, Pinako and Den, Barry the Chopper and the Slicer Brothers, Envy, Havoc, and Hughes

The Fullmetal Alchemist manga and anime series feature an extensive cast of fictional characters created by Hiromu Arakawa. The story is set in a fictional universe within the 20th century in which alchemy is one of the most advanced scientific techniques. Although they essentially start off the same, the 2003 anime series features an entire original story while adapting the first seven volumes of the manga, which were the only ones available from the source material at the time. The second anime, Fullmetal Alchemist: Brotherhood, follows the manga exclusively.

The story follows the adventures of the titular character, Edward Elric, also known as the "Fullmetal Alchemist", who is frequently accompanied by his brother Alphonse. While trying to revive their mother, the brothers lost parts of their bodies, with Alphonse's soul being contained in a suit of armor, and Edward replacing his right arm and left leg with two sets of automail, a type of advanced prosthetic limb. Advised by Roy Mustang, an alchemist from the State Military, Edward becomes a State Alchemist, and starts traveling with Alphonse through the country of Amestris in order to find a way to recover their bodies. In their search, they hear of the Philosopher's Stone, a powerful alchemy artifact that the brothers can use to recover their bodies.

When creating the series, Arakawa took her inspiration from several experiences in her childhood, including her parents' jobs and the manga she used to read. She also interviewed real war veterans for inspiration of her characters. Several types of merchandising have also been released based on the characters from the series. Reviewers from manga, anime, and other media have also commented on the characters. Most of them have praised their development in the story as well as Arakawa's artwork.

== Creation and conception ==
Author Hiromu Arakawa integrated several social problems into the story after talking to people who had suffered and lived through them, such as refugees, war veterans and former yakuza, or simply by watching news concerning those issues. Several plot elements expand on these themes, such as Pinako Rockbell caring for the Elric brothers after the death of their mother, and the brothers helping people all over the country to gain an understanding of the meaning of family. Many characters of the series differ from the manga to the first anime, the homunculi being the most notable, which was because Arakawa wanted the first anime to have a different ending from the manga, to avoid repeating the same events in both series.

Arakawa said that she became attracted by the idea of using alchemy in the manga after reading about the philosopher's stone. She liked it so much that she started reading books of alchemy, which she found very complicated because some books contradicted others.

In the making of the characters' designs, Arakawa has commented that the manga authors Suihō Tagawa and Hiroyuki Eto are her main inspirations, and she also mentions her artwork is a mix of both of them. When drawing the series' characters, Alex Louis Armstrong and the little animals are the easiest for her to draw. Due to the fact she likes dogs, Arakawa added several of them in the story. She also adds various muscles to most of the characters fearing that otherwise they may look much too thin to the point they could look unhealthy. Despite being requested several times by fans to show the characters' birthdates, Arakawa has claimed that she never thought of them.^{[vol. 12, omake]}

In the two animated adaptations of the Fullmetal Alchemist manga, the characters have been voiced by famous voice actors such as Romi Park and Rie Kugimiya who portray Edward and Alphonse, respectively, in Japanese. In the second adaptation, most of the Japanese voice actors were replaced with the exception of a few, including Park and Kugimiya who reprised their roles. On the other hand, most of the English voice actors from the first anime reprised their roles for Brotherhood with the exception of a few such as Aaron Dismuke (Alphonse) and Dameon Clarke (Scar) who are replaced by Maxey Whitehead and J. Michael Tatum, respectively.

== Main characters ==
=== Edward Elric ===
Edward "Ed" Elric (エドワード・エルリック, Edowādo Erurikku), the "Fullmetal Alchemist" (鋼の錬金術師, Hagane no Renkinjutsushi), is the youngest State Alchemist in history, joining the program at the age of 12. He and his younger brother, Alphonse, scour the world in search of the Philosopher's Stone (賢者の石, Kenja no Ishi), in the hopes of restoring their bodies. Edward lost his left leg in a futile attempt to revive his mother, Trisha, using an illegal method of human transmutation, and lost his right arm in exchange for attaching Alphonse's soul to a suit of armor. Edward now employs the use of metal prosthetics, known as automail (機械鎧(オートメイル), Ōtomeiru), as replacement limbs. However, as attempting to resurrect a human opens a portal called the Gate of Truth (真理の扉, Shinri no Tobira) to allow the committer/s to see the Truth (真理, Shinri), Edward gained great knowledge of the universe as well as the powerful ability to perform transmutations without transmutation circles. Edward is smart, brave and even bold, but also has a prideful tendency to be harsh and arrogant. He harbors a sharp sensitivity to his short height; a recurring gag in both manga and the anime series is for Edward to overly react to people who call him short.^{[ch. 2]} Romi Park and Vic Mignogna voice him in the Japanese and English versions, respectively.^{ep. 1} ^{ep. 1} In the live-action film adaptation, he is portrayed by Ryosuke Yamada.

=== Alphonse Elric ===
Alphonse "Al" Elric (アルフォンス・エルリック, Arufonsu Erurikku) is Edward's younger brother. Together, both of them scour the country in search of the Philosopher's Stone in the hopes of restoring their bodies. Unlike Ed, who lost one of his legs in the failed attempt to revive the brothers' mother, Al lost his entire body. At the last moment, and at the cost of one of his arms, Ed sealed Al's soul in a large suit of armor, making Al almost invulnerable.^{[ch. 2]} Following the incident, he and Edward journey together in order to restore their bodies. Rie Kugimiya voices him in the Japanese series, Aaron Dismuke in the first English series,^{ep. 1} ^{ep. 1} and Maxey Whitehead in the second English series.

=== Roy Mustang ===
Colonel/Major Roy Mustang (ロイ・マスタング, Roi Masutangu), the "Flame Alchemist" (焔の錬金術師, Honō no Renkinjutsushi), is a State Alchemist and Edward's direct superior. He is promoted to Brigadier General at the end of the series and is a General in the epilogue. He aims towards becoming the next Führer of Amestris, heavily relying on the support of his loyal subordinates to propel him along that path.^{[ch. 5, 61]} Mustang finds this path interrupted by the murder of his best friend and confidant, Maes Hughes; afterward, he begins an almost behind-the-scenes investigation into finding the true culprit.^{[ch. 16]} Tōru Ōkawa and Travis Willingham voice Mustang in the Japanese and English versions, respectively.^{ep. 3} ^{ep. 3} In the second anime series, he is voiced by Shin-ichiro Miki ^{ep. 1} with Travis Willingham reprising the role in the dub. In the live-action film adaptation, he is portrayed by Dean Fujioka.

=== Winry Rockbell ===
Winry Rockbell (ウィンリィ・ロックベル, Winri Rokkuberu), a childhood friend of Edward and Alphonse Elric, lives in Resembool with her grandmother, Pinako Rockbell, who raised her after the death of her parents during the Ishbal War.^{[ch. 9,24]} Her parents were killed by Scar in a blind rage. Winry is a practicing and gifted automail mechanic; a prodigy following in her grandmother's footsteps, continually designing and maintaining Edward Elric's automail prosthetics. She is well known for working in Rush Valley as a promising engineer with many loyal customers. Winry is often used as an unwitting hostage by the homunculi to ensure the Elrics' subservience to the State.^{[ch. 56]} Winry is known for helping the Elrics' emotionally and physically, behaving understandingly and compassionately towards them. She and Edward get married in the concluding moments of the manga, as their relationship is built upon communication and reliance. In the first anime, her parents were executed by a younger Roy Mustang under Military order. She is voiced by Megumi Toyoguchi and Caitlin Glass in the Japanese and English versions, respectively.^{ep. 3} ^{ep. 3} In the second series, she is voiced by Megumi Takamoto in Japanese,^{ep. 2} and Glass reprises her in the English version. In the live-action film adaptation, she is portrayed by Tsubasa Honda.

=== Scar ===
Scar (傷の男(スカー), Sukā; literally "the scarred man") is one of the survivors of the Ishbalan Extermination Campaign,^{[ch. 6]} and named for the scar across his face. Depicted as an Ishbalan warrior priest, Scar was a capable fighter who desperately tried to save whomever he could from the onslaught. However, Kimblee's enhanced alchemical attacks were too much. Scar's brother, who had been researching Amestrian alchemy and Xingese alkahestry (considered heresy by Ishbalans) in an attempt to gain power against the State, gives Scar his right arm in order to save his life.^{[ch. 61]} Scar initially targeted State Alchemists for their role in his people's slaughter, even becoming an enemy of the Elrics after he killed Nina Tucker as an act of mercy after she was turned into a chimera, but ultimately sided with them upon learning that the Homunculi are his actual enemies.

=== May Chang ===
May Chang (メイ・チャン, Mei Chan) is the seventeenth princess of Xing who represents the Chang clan. Unlike Lin Yao, she comes to Amestris without any bodyguards due to her clan's poor status, only having her small pet panda, Xiao Mei that had gotten a disease to keep her from growing, keeping her small, to keep her company. May is particularly skilled in alkahestry by using throwing knives (鏢, hyō) to create two transmutation circles, one at her intended target and one near herself, allowing her to manipulate matter at a distance. She is somewhat imaginative in nature; having imagined Edward Elric as a tall and handsome young man before actually meeting him and proclaiming that he intentionally misled her.^{[ch. 32]} May later falls in love with Alphonse Elric, also picturing his real form as a handsome man.^{[ch. 62]} Soon after arriving in Amestris on her search for immortality, May teams up with Scar, assisting him on his travels. For a time, she also unknowingly fights the Elric brothers before eventually teaming up with Alphonse, who she developed feelings for, to capture Envy and bring the weakened homunculus to Xing.^{[ch. 80]} However, her guilt manipulated by Envy, May resolves to help her friends in Central City. After Father's defeat, relieved upon hearing of her half brother's intentions as emperor, May returns to Xing alongside Lin and Lan Fan. In the epilogue, May is seen in a family photo together with Alphonse, Winry, Edward, and the couple's son and daughter.^{[ch. 108]} Her Japanese voice actress is Mai Goto and her English voice actress is Monica Rial.^{ep. 15} In the live-action film trilogy adaptation, May Chang is portrayed by Ron Monroe.

=== Lin Yao ===
Lin Yao (リン・ヤオ, Rin Yao; "Ling Yao" in the first Viz's volumes and the second anime) is the twelfth prince of Xing, and represents the Yao Clan. He meets Edward Elric soon after arriving in Amestris, whom he aggravates by being both younger and taller than him. He also tends to leave Edward with pricey dinner bills before quietly slipping away. Despite his laid-back, goofy, and undignified personality, Lin is a skilled swordsman who keeps a cool head in hostile situations.^{[ch. 33]} His major ambition is to replace his father as Xing's new emperor, and as such operates under the belief that power cannot be obtained without the people's support. He is very close to his bodyguards, Lan Fan and Fu, often showing greater concern for their safety than finding immortality and becoming emperor.^{[ch. 46]} Throughout the series, Lin's ongoing search for immortality in Amestris results in numerous encounters with the homunculi, whom he can sense like other Xingese characters. He eventually becomes a homunculus himself so as to become immortal, relinquishing his body to Greed without any resistance.^{[ch. 54]} However, they eventually come to an agreement to the point where Lin can take control when he feels it is necessary.^{[ch. 86]} During the final battle, Lin becomes a normal human again when Greed transfers himself back into Father's body to weaken him. Following Father's defeat, having gained a philosopher's stone, Lin returns to Xing and, with the experience he and Lan Fan learned from the people of Amestris, becomes the new emperor with the intent of uniting all the nation's segregated clans under his rule.^{[ch. 108]} He is voiced by Mamoru Miyano^{ep. 15} in the Japanese version and Todd Haberkorn in English. In the live-action film trilogy adaptation, he is portrayed by Keisuke Watanabe.

== Villains ==
=== Homunculi ===
From left to right: Lust, Envy, Sloth, Gluttony, Pride, Wrath, and Greed (the original version) in the manga

Homunculi (ホムンクルス, Homunkurusu) serve as the primary antagonistic force in Fullmetal Alchemist. They are a race of artificial humanoids who were created by the Homunculus Father by extracting what he believed to be his natural flaws into fragments of his Philosopher's Stone.^{[ch. 97]}^{[ch. 53]} Being personifications of Father's darkest aspects, each named after one of the seven deadly sins and identified through an Ouroboros tattoo located somewhere on their bodies, Homunculi possess great physical prowess with the long life and nigh indestructibility provided by their Philosopher's Stones playing in their arrogance while seeing themselves as superior to humans. The only means of permanently killing a Homunculus is dwindling their Philosopher's Stone until they are unable to revive themselves once killed.^{[ch. 39]} While the majority of Homunculi are placed into artificial bodies created from his flesh, Father has also implanted two of his "children" into human bodies as were the case with King Bradley and the second Greed.

In the first anime, homunculi are the result of an alchemist's failed attempt to resurrecting a person via human transmutation. The resulting misshaped creatures are later exposed to incomplete Philosopher's Stones that enable them to closely resemble the deceased humans they were intended to be. These homunculi are led by Dante, and feed on incomplete Philosopher's Stones to fuel their powers; they are susceptible to death once enough of the stones are regurgitated. The homunculi of the first anime possess an additional weakness: a remnant of their original bodies (a bone, hair, etc.), which weaken and immobilize them when they come in contact with them before they can successfully be killed.^{ep. 34}

==== Father ====
"Father" (お父様, Otō-sama) is the creator and leader of the other homunculi, and the series' main antagonist. He is a cruel and greedy homunculus with no regard for human life, likening them to insects.^{[ch. 31]} He was originally known as "The Dwarf in the Flask" (フラスコの中の小人, Furasuko no Naka no Kobito) or "Homunculus" (ホムンクルス, Homunkurusu), a shapeshifting cyclops-like creature created eight centuries ago in the country of Xerxes (クセルクセス, Kuserukusesu; "Cselkcess" in the English manga) under the commission of its king to obtain infinite knowledge.^{[ch. 74]} Unable to survive outside his flask, Homunculus formed an attachment to the young slave boy (Slave 23) whose blood had been used in his creation, naming the lad Van Hohenheim while helping him rise in Xerxian society by teaching him to read, write and alchemy. Homunculus grew envious of the human race over their mutual emotional support for each other while being the only one of his kind, losing sight of his own gifts and talents while playing on the desperate King's desire for immortality. He tricks the king into creating a country-wide transmutation circle for the creation of a Philosopher's Stone, whose necessary ingredient is the souls of several living human beings. Once activated, Homunculus ensured that he and the unaware Hohenheim were in the center to absorb the souls of the Xerxian population between them. During the process, Homunculus used Hohenheim's blood within him to create a humanoid husk body to serve as his mobile vessel before parting ways.^{[ch. 75]}

After searching for the nearest area closest to the "center of the world", the now prideful and greedy Homunculus established Amestris under the title of "The Eastern Sage" and taught alchemy to its people for the sake of his master plan: engineering every war in the country's history to bring it into the form of a perfect circle with sites of bloody carnage at all the cardinal points—the necessary configuration for the transmutation of another Philosopher's Stone and repeat his actions in Xerxes on a higher scale to open the Gate and become a "perfect being" with absolute freedom and all the knowledge by absorbing God. Father then attempted to purge out his cardinal sins as a means to elevate himself, creating his homunculi offspring to gain a family. Father then uses his homunculi to gather "sacrifices", alchemists of notable skill who attempted human transmutation and survived and gained knowledge of the "Truth"; these "sacrifices" are necessary for Father's plan to work.^{[ch. 100]} As an additional precaution against alchemists, Father stationed himself underground above the tectonic plates so that he can negate any form of alchemy that derives its power from tectonic energy.^{[ch. 54]} Having left the eyes of the Amestrian public, referred to as the "Good Gentleman" by his human subordinates, Father keeps in touch with the country's highest-ranking human officials to maintain the country's growth under his absolute authority and control.

Eventually, Father's plans come to fruition on the "Promised Day" (約束の日, Yakusoku no Hi) as the Nation-Wide Transmutation Circle can only be activated during a solar eclipse (the sun symbolizes a man, and the moon symbolizes a woman, with an eclipse representing a perfect being). Father manages to restrain his sacrifices and so he can gather enough souls into his body from Amestris's people to absorb the trans-dimensional entity beyond the Gate which he called "God" (神, Kami). From there, Father creates a new youthful body with his powers increased to the point of defying natural order and tries to get rid of the human sacrifices. But Hohenheim's transmutation circle restored the Amestrians' souls to their bodies with Father starting to lose control over the entity within him and limiting his strength.^{[ch. 104, 107]} Furthermore, with Scar removing his ability to block the Amestrians' alchemy, Father is weakened when attacked by all sides. After Edward manages to pierce Father's chest to free the remaining trapped souls that consisted of his dwindled Philosopher's Stone, "God" proceeds to turn Father inside out and drags him before the gate. As he is taken away, Father laments the harshness of reality, crying out that he does not understand why reality denies him getting his greatest desires and true freedom being so impossible to achieve. At his personal Gate of Truth and reduced to his original form, Father is confronted by Truth. There he complains about why God has rejected him and that he only wanted perfection, all the worlds knowledge for himself. Truth poetically punishes Father by letting the gate drag him back into it (where he was presumably created from), thus letting Father stand in God's place in some senses while stripping Father completely of the freedom he cherished, but not before admonishing the homunculus for having learned nothing and having never grown from his days in the flask.^{[ch. 108]} He is voiced by Iemasa Kayumi in Japanese and by Kent Williams in English. In the mobile game adaptation, he is voiced by Akio Otsuka after Kayumi's death. In the live-action film trilogy adaptation, he is portrayed by Seiyō Uchino.

Car Liminger notes that while the entirety of FMA:B could be called epic, "Father's plan to consume God is of such scale and its result so mind-bogglingly spectacular that it can't be called anything else". IGN ranked him as the 10th best anime villain of all time, saying that he makes "for a kind of weird analogy with the Greek god Uranus where he's the father of the lesser powers who generally try to control humanity for their own goals and pleasures." They also praise "the sheer scale of his villainy. Over the course of centuries, he regularly annihilates cities and even countries to gain more power. He's got the blood of millions on his hands, and this doesn't bother him in the slightest. He is the quintessential villain who seeks power just for the sake of having power, and his complete indifference to humanity makes him a true monster." Rob Bricken, in his list of Top 11 most evil anime villains of all time, he ranks Father as #2, saying that his deed of sacrificing a whole country to simply absorb the power of God is "a feat as arrogant as it is evil," and that "he's more than willing to kill his own children, the Homunculi, in order to achieve his ends."

==== Pride ====
Pride (プライド, Puraido) the Arrogant is the first of Father's homunculi to be created, resembling Father's true form as he appears as an amorphous shadow with multiple eyes.^{[ch. 78]} He orders his younger "siblings" to perform their respective tasks. Pride can destroy or manipulate anything that his shadow comes into contact with, see anything through his shadow, possess the bodies of others by repressing their connections to their respective souls, and gain the physical traits of whomever he eats, such as Gluttony's appetite and sense of smell.^{[ch. 87]} The presence of his unleashed form gives off an intense, dreadful pressure. His identity is a mystery until the latter half of the series when he is revealed to be Selim Bradley (セリム・ブラッドレイ, Serimu Buraddorei), the adoptive son of King Bradley.^{[ch. 70]} Pride can only exist within a given area: the area surrounding his host body and the underground transmutation circle running throughout Amestris, which he is tasked to guard. He needs a light source in order to be able to cast, and subsequently use, his shadow, and it can similarly be "killed" if the light becomes too bright.^{[ch. 88]} Hubristic and boastful, he bears disdain for the human race (and Homunculi that do not share his views on humans), enjoys shaming and mocking others, and acts in a guiltless, abhorrent, and self-seeking way towards virtually everyone, including most of his fellow Homunculi. He gets angered by any defiance coming from his younger "siblings". He thinks in a very biased manner, using excuses to provide justifications for his cruelty. Despite these baleful traits, he has some attachment to his adoptive human mother.

The Elric brothers and their allies battle Pride several times, beginning on the eve of the Promised Day. After a weakened Pride tries to hijack Ed's body in a last ditch attempt to survive that fails because of Kimblee's soul stopping him, Edward destroys Pride's body in battle, reducing him to his true form: a minuscule, defenseless fetus-like creature.^{[ch. 106]} After the battle with Father ends, the now powerless Pride is brought to his adoptive mother and raised all over again. Two years later, Selim is shown to have grown into a much more compassionate young child.^{[ch. 108]}

In the first anime adaptation, Pride represents the true identity of King Bradley, while Selim is a normal human child who briefly appears at the end of the series, arriving at the fight between Bradley and Roy Mustang with the homunculus' original human skull. Bradley is weakened by its presence, but manages to spitefully strangle Selim to death before he is subsequently burned to death by Mustang.

In the first anime, Makoto Tsumura voices Selim in the Japanese version, and Zarah Little in the English dub.^{ep. 51} His voice in the second series is provided by Yūko Sanpei in Japanese, and by Brittney Karbowski in English. In the live-action film trilogy adaptation, he is portrayed by Kokoro Terada.

==== Wrath ====
Wrath (ラース, Rāsu), the Furious, is the true identity of King Bradley (キング・ブラッドレイ, Kingu Buraddorei), the leader of Amestris's State Military and the leader of Amestris, having the title of Führer President (大総統, Daisōtō).^{[ch. 29]} While portraying himself as a kind, if laid-back ruler, Bradley ultimately reveals himself to be a hateful and brutal cynic. While a proficient swordsman, Bradley augments his deadly swordsmanship with the "Ultimate Eye" (最強の眼, Saikyō no Me), a clairvoyant eye that bears the Ouroboros symbol, which is usually covered by an eyepatch. The eye enables him to predict his opponent's next move to counter along with having far better eyesight superior to the normal human eye.^{[ch. 29]}

Being the last homunculus to be created by Father at the time of the story's beginning, Bradley was originally a human who was raised and trained along with other children to become Amestris' ideal leader. When he and the others were subjected to Father's Philosopher's Stone being directly injected into their blood system, only Bradley survived despite having dwindled the infused stone down to one soul as a result of his transition into a homunculus though he admitted of not knowing if he retained his original human soul from the ordeal. This resulted in Bradley still aging like a human, a trait that irritates him because his ailing body cannot keep up with the speed of his eye's predictions.^{[ch. 53]} Because homunculi cannot reproduce, Bradley was given a family to keep up appearances: his son, Selim Bradley, who is actually his older brother Pride, and a wife he personally chose.^{[ch. 80]} After receiving various wounds while fighting against Buccaneer, Fu and Greed, Bradley fights Scar and taunts Scar for his use of alchemy, but while both men were grievously wounded in battle, Bradley ended up getting the most fatal injuries, with both his arms blown off in the process by Scar. Upon his death, Bradley taunts Lan Fan that she should have taken her revenge on him while the opportunity rises, but instead using the opportunity to ask him if he has any regrets. As Bradley's dying body rapidly ages, he concludes that despite his life being entirely controlled by Father, he lived a good life specifically because of humans.^{[ch. 105]}

In the first anime adaptation, Bradley is Pride while an original Homunculus is introduced to serve the story's version of Wrath. Here, Wrath is the result of Izumi's attempt to revive her infant child. Her effort failed and she sent the infant's body beyond the Gate of Truth out of shame. There, the child, Wrath, grew up. When Ed later lost his arm and leg while trying to revive his mother, Wrath took both for himself, which allowed him to use alchemy and escape to Amestris.^{ep. 31} Because of his ability to perform alchemy, Wrath can assimilate any sort of material or object into his body. He takes the side of the Elrics after Dante removes his limbs to keep him quiet after Wrath attempted to revive Sloth himself. He is later given automail replacements by Winry.^{ep. 51} He appears again in Conqueror of Shamballa, in which he battles against Gluttony so that Al can use them both as sacrifices to open the Gate of Truth. Al does so and is able to reunite with Ed, while Wrath is able to reunite with the spirit of Izumi.

Bradley is voiced by Hidekatsu Shibata and Hidenobu Kiuchi as a young man in the Japanese versions, and by Ed Blaylock and Christopher Bevins as a young man in English dubs.^{ep. 6} ^{ep. 6} In the live-action film trilogy adaptation, Bradley is portrayed by Hiroshi Tachi. The first anime's version of Wrath is voiced by Nana Mizuki in the Japanese series,^{ep. 28} and by Luci Christian in the English dub.^{ep. 28}

==== Envy ====
Envy (エンヴィー, Envī), the Jealous, is a shape-shifting homunculus whose preferred form is that of an androgynous-looking teenage young man. While Envy can assume their actual form of an enormous leviathan creature, its body pulsing the faces of the Xerxes citizens who constitute their Philosopher's Stone, Envy's true form is revealed to be a tiny reptile-like parasitic creature once enough of their Philosopher's Stone is heavily dwindled.^{[ch. 53]}^{[ch. 79]} Envy serves as an infiltrator for the other homunculi, often assuming another's identity to gain sensitive intel or for manipulation purposes.^{[ch. 6]} Envy is also a sadist who enjoys inflicting pain on humans, having caused the Ishbalan Civil War by impersonating a soldier to murder an Ishbalan child.^{[ch. 51]}

First seen impersonating Father Cornello and burning down the Fifth Laboratory, Envy personally murdered Maes Hughes while framing Maria Ross for the crime. After Mustang kills Lust, Envy takes over as the homunculus' liaison while recruiting Kimblee to capture Dr. Marcoh. However, Envy is lured into a trap, and has their stone nearly destroyed by Marcoh and being forced into their true form while being handed over to May Chang in a glass jar for her to take back to Xing. Later, Envy plays on May's compassion to trick her into taking them to Central so they can reconstitute their body, doing so by absorbing several of the Mannequin Soldiers for their Philosopher's Stones.^{[ch. 80]} Soon after, Mustang confronts Envy and, upon the Homunculus gleefully admitting to being Hughes' murderer, falls into a furious rampage, hunting them down. Finally cornering Envy while they are fighting Riza, Mustang repeatedly incinerates the homunculus until they are reduced back to their powerless state. Envy is then spared from Mustang's revenge-driven wrath when Edward, Scar, and Riza convince him not to kill the creature.^{[ch. 94]} Envy makes an attempt to implode their captors' alliance by reminding them all of their past actions against each other. They snap when Edward deduces that Envy is jealous of humans for their ability to persevere through tragedy and form new connections with each other in spite of bad circumstances. Upset and humiliated, Envy commits suicide by tearing out their Philosopher's Stone core and crushing it rather than live with the knowledge that a "lowly human" understood their personal plight.^{[ch. 95]}

In the first anime adaptation, portrayed as clearly male, Envy was the first homunculus created in the story from the body of Van Hohenheim's son with Dante long ago.^{ep. 50} This influenced Envy to serve as Dante's right hand while expressing a personal vendetta against the Elric brothers for receiving the fatherly love he never had. That vendetta intensified when Envy learned that Dante disposed of Hohenheim in his absence while refusing to let the Elric brothers keep the Philosopher's Stone. During the finale, Envy reveals to Edward and Alphonse that he is their older half brother, who died 380 years ago of mercury poisoning. After which Envy succeeds in fatally wounding Edward, but is dragged with him to the Gate of Truth when Alphonse uses the stone to sacrifice himself to save his brother's life after he fails to stop him. When Envy learns that Hohenheim is still alive and on the opposite side of the Gate, the Homunculus forces his way through and permanently ends up in the form of a giant serpentine dragon upon reaching Earth. It was revealed in Fullmetal Alchemist the Movie: Conqueror of Shamballa that Envy has been captured by the Thule Society for their own agenda of invading Ametris while finally killing Hohenheim, Envy is destroyed when used by the Society to create a gateway linking the two realities.

Envy is voiced by Mayumi Yamaguchi in the first Japanese series, and by Minami Takayama in the second.^{ep. 22} ^{ep. 8} Envy's voice in the English adaptations is provided by Wendy Powell.^{ep. 22} ^{ep. 8} In the live-action film adaptation, Envy is portrayed by Kanata Hongō.

==== Greed ====
Greed (グリード, Gurīdo) the Avaricious, the "Ultimate Shield" (最強の盾, Saikyō no Tate), is a rogue homunculus who craves money, women, and otherworldly possessions above all else. Because of this, he betrays the homunculi, as working to feed Father's greed would deprive Greed of his own greedy desires. He has the ability to rearrange the carbon atoms that coats his entire body into diamond-hard body armor. Greed is introduced when he sends some of his chimera subordinates to capture Alphonse Elric so he can obtain the secret of immortality from him and Edward.^{ch.27}

The State Military soon raids their location to rescue Al, where King Bradley repeatedly kills Greed to finally subdue him, taking him back to Father.^{[ch. 30]} Unwilling to rejoin them, Greed is melted down to his Philosopher's Stone and is consumed by Father.^{[ch. 31]} Later, Lin Yao, in his search for immortality, offers to become the new Greed. Greed is given complete control of Lin's body after Lin willingly relinquishes control, believing this to be the only way to gain immortality.^{[ch. 56]} Though this Greed initially has no recollections of his actions as the former Greed, Bido's death brings back the memories of all his loyal subordinates.^{[ch. 82]} Angry with Bradley for killing his "possessions", and further provoked by Lin, the new Greed defects from the homunculi once more, eventually joining forces with Edward Elric during their fight against Father, intending to take Father's powers and use them for world domination.^{[ch. 83]} However, during the final battle, Greed comes to a realization his true desire is friendship.^{[ch. 107]} To that end, Greed sacrifices himself to aid Edward by transferring himself from Lin's body into a weakened Father, using his abilities to render Father's shell extremely fragile before being extinguished. While Father mortally wounds him by snapping his teeth shut, he happily calls Edward and Ling his dearest friends and that he does not need anything else before disintegrating.^{[ch. 108]}

In the first anime adaptation, Greed escapes the raid and flees to Dante's mansion. Dante, who had created Greed when attempting to revive her dead lover, still retains the bones from his original body, which leaves him severely weakened. Edward kills Greed soon after he is made to believe that Greed killed Dante, though not before leaving with the valuable knowledge of how to kill the homunculi. After that, Edward, Alphonse and Izumi bury Greed and Dante.^{ep. 34}

He is voiced by Junichi Suwabe in Japanese, and Chris Patton in English.^{ep. 33} ^{ep. 33} For the second series, his voice is provided by Yuichi Nakamura in Japanese;^{ep. 13} in English, Patton reprises his role for the first Greed, while the second Greed is voiced by Troy Baker.

==== Gluttony ====
Gluttony (グラトニー, Guratonī), the Voracious, possessing powerful jaws and acidic saliva, is an obese, simple-minded homunculus whose thoughts rarely stray far from eating anything. He particularly likes eating people, and the only way he can find enjoyment in a battle is if he can eat his opponent afterward.^{[ch. 2]} During most of the story, Gluttony typically appears in the company of Lust whom he has an attachment to.

Gluttony is the failed product of Father's attempts to create a Gate of Truth. When activating this imperfect portal, Gluttony's stomach opens up, revealing a bestial counter-version of the Eye of Providence at its center. His ribs spread out to act as a border for the gate and double as large extensible teeth that can consume everything in his corrupt Eye's field of vision in an instant.^{[ch. 49]} Anything Gluttony consumes is transported to a stagnant, hellish dimension, which is filled with an endless repugnant sea of blood, and is littered with victims and artifacts from centuries before the start of the series.^{[ch. 51]} In the ensuing battles after Lust's death, the energy in Gluttony's Philosopher's Stone is exhausted to the point of nearly dying.^{[ch. 56]} Father later restores Gluttony and sends him with Pride to capture the Elrics. Gluttony is repeatedly killed by Greed and Lan Fan, which causes Pride to devour Gluttony in order to gain his abilities while replenishing his own Philosopher's stone.^{[ch. 86]}^{[ch. 87]}

The first anime adaptation instead explains Gluttony's origins as a way to produce imperfect Philosopher's Stones from the souls of the people he eats. When Gluttony fell into great depression after Lust's death, he is transformed by Dante into a mindless eating machine. This act ultimately backfires when Gluttony eats Dante, with the homunculus remaining under Central City before being ultimately destroyed by Wrath using him as payment along with himself to open the Gate.^{ep. 51}

Yasuhiro Takato voices him in the first Japanese series, and Tetsu Shiratori in the second.^{ep. 22} ^{ep. 3} Chris Cason is his English voice actor.^{ep. 22} ^{ep. 3} Shinji Uchiyama portrays him in the live-action film adaptation.

==== Sloth ====
Sloth (スロウス, Surōsu), the Indolent, is a large, muscular, dim-witted homunculus who believes everything to be pointless and tiresome. Despite his lazy nature, he is very strong physically and is the fastest of the homunculi.^{[ch. 92]} He typically chooses to be indifferent and is extremely reluctant to care about anyone or anything. He is tasked with digging a gigantic transmutation circle beneath Amestris to be used in turning the country into a Philosopher's Stone. Though he is briefly impeded in this job when he runs into the Elric brothers at Briggs' Fortress, he is allowed to continue his work. After finishing the circle,^{[ch. 78]} Sloth serves as Father's bodyguard and fights off Mustang and Olivier's troops when they invade Central.^{[ch. 92]} He is eventually killed through the combined efforts of the Armstrong siblings and Izumi and Sig Curtis. Sloth accepted death with a smile as "living was too much effort."^{[ch. 96]} He is voiced by Fumihiko Tachiki in Japanese and Patrick Seitz in English.^{ep. 34}

In the first anime adaptation, Sloth is the product of the Elric brothers' attempt to revive their mother, Trisha Elric, found by Dante and fed incomplete Philosopher's Stones until she assumes her original form's likeness. She is given the alias "Juliet Douglas" (ジュリエット・ダグラス, Jurietto Dagurasu) and appointed as King Bradley's personal secretary, allowing her to serve as the homunculi's direct contact within the State Military. She has a peevish personality, and is able to transform her body into a watery composition, which she uses to drown others by grabbing hold of them.^{ep. 42} During her final battle with the Elric brothers, Wrath, having merged with Trisha's remains earlier, merges with Sloth's body so that he would never have to be separated from her. This leaves Sloth paralyzed, allowing Edward Elric to defeat her. Yoshino Takamori is her Japanese voice actress, and Lydia Mackay her English voice actress.^{ep. 3} ^{ep. 3}

==== Lust ====
Lust (ラスト, Rasuto), the Lascivious, the "Ultimate Spear" (最強の矛, Saikyō no Hoko),^{[ch. 31]} appears as a shapely woman who acts as an envoy for her leadership in both iterations, and encourages humans down her desired path. She also serves as the homunculi's primary assassin, killing those who discover their plans, and also those who had served as the homunculi's allies but are considered disposable. She can extend her fingers to great lengths, and these fingers are capable of cutting through most substances on Earth.^{[ch. 2]} After leading an effort to capture Barry the Chopper, her plans backfire when Roy Mustang infiltrates the homunculi's secret lair.^{[ch. 38]} Mustang repeatedly blasts Lust with flames, ultimately killing her after depleting the power of her Philosopher's Stone. As she dies, Lust taunts Mustang of his impending doom. ^{[ch. 39]}

In the first anime adaptation, Lust was created when Scar's brother tried to revive his deceased lover.^{ep. 40} Though originally largely the same as her manga counterpart, Lust begins to develop a strong desire to regain her humanity as the series progresses. This ultimately leads to her defection from the homunculi and aiding Edward on the condition he helps her become human. Lust ends up being killed by Wrath after he paralyzed her using a locket filled with the hair from her original form, accepting her fate while speculating that she might have driven by existential curiosity.^{ep. 47}

In Japanese, she is voiced by Yūko Satō in the first series and by Kikuko Inoue in the second.^{ep. 1} ^{ep. 3} She is voiced by Laura Bailey in English. In the live-action film adaptation, she is portrayed by Yasuko Matsuyuki.

=== Father Cornello ===
Cornello (コーネロ, Kōnero) is a charlatan who founded the Church of Leto in Liore, using an imitation Philosopher's Stone provided to him by Lust to present himself as a holy man so he can ultimately use his legion of followers to take over the country. When the Elric brothers arrive at Liore for his stone, he lures them into the church for them to be killed. Once Cornello reveals his true colors to the brothers and his follower Rosé, they engage into conflict, outwitting him and exposing his deception to the public. Humiliated, Cornello attempts to kill Ed out of spite, only to suffer an infliction to his hand from an alchemical rebound caused by exhausting his stone before being defeated. Retreating to where Lust and Gluttony are, Cornello pleads with the former to save him from the angry mob, only to be killed as he served his purpose, with his corpse eaten by Gluttony while Envy assumes his identity to complete their plans for the town as a node of the Nation Wide Transmutation Circle.

Cornello is voiced by Kinryu Arimoto in the first Japanese series and Seizō Katō in the second anime series, Andy Mullins voicing Cornello in both English versions.^{ep. 1} ^{ep. 3} Cornello is portrayed by Kenjirō Ishimaru in the live-action film adaptation.

=== Shou Tucker ===
Major Shou Tucker (ショウ・タッカー, Shō Takkā), the "Sewing-Life Alchemist" (綴命の錬金術師, Teimei no Renkinjutsushi), is a bio-alchemist who excels in the creation of chimeras and became a State Alchemist by creating a talking chimera which starved itself to death shortly after its creation. Prior to his certification, he and his family were left in poverty after his wife left him two years ago, leaving only him and his daughter Nina. The Elric brothers first visit his residence to find information on chimeric alchemy after confronting a chimera on their previous adventures as a way to restore their bodies. After meeting Tucker and returning to further their studies, they learn during their third visit that the talking chimera was actually his wife fused with another animal when they discover a second one Tucker created by fusing Nina with his pet Pyrenean Mountain Dog Alexander in order to maintain his position as State Alchemist. When confronted, Tucker expresses no remorse for his actions while justifying them from a scientific point of view, leaving a mortified Edward with a painful lesson. After being beaten to within an inch of his life by Edward and placed under house arrest for his actions, Tucker is later confronted and executed by Scar along with the Nina-Alexander hybrid.^{[ch. 5]}

In the first anime adaptation, Tucker is still arrested and labeled legally dead when reported to have been secretly executed by the State, with the Nina-Alexander chimera having escaped during the arrest and subsequently euthanized by Scar. Tucker is reassigned to perform classified research in creating chimeras within the clandestine 5th Laboratory. Tucker eventually becomes a chimera while experimenting to resurrect Nina, gaining the appearance of a man crucified upon the back of a large unspecified canine. Bent on achieving his goals of reviving Nina by any means, Tucker sides with Greed's faction and then Frank Archer before going into hiding. Though Tucker succeeds in recreating Nina's human body using the Philosopher's Stone, he loses his remaining sanity when he discovers that Nina has no soul.^{ep. 48}

In the second anime adaptation, his death at the hands of Scar still happens.

Appearing in the live-action film as a major antagonist, Tucker serves as an accomplice to a military coup planning to take control of Amestris after being arrested for his crimes. Out of spite towards Edward for exposing him, he helps them create Mannequin Soldiers to ravage the country before being fatally wounded by Lust, who leaves him to die with his ambitions unfulfilled.

Tucker is voiced by Makoto Nagai and Chuck Huber in the Japanese and English versions, respectively.^{ep. 3} ^{ep. 4} Tucker is portrayed by Yo Oizumi in the live-action film adaptation.

In a November 2023 Ranker poll of 180,000 users, Shou Tucker was ranked as the 6th most hated TV character of all time.

=== Solf J. Kimblee ===
Major Solf J. Kimblee (ゾルフ・J・キンブリー, Zorufu Jei Kinburī)—the "Crimson Lotus Alchemist" or "Crimson Alchemist" (紅蓮の錬金術師, Guren no Renkinjutsushi)—is a sadistic sociopath with an artistic flair for destruction. He earned fame during the Ishbalan Civil War for his ruthless commitment to the mass slaughter of the Ishbalan people while laying many villages to waste. Using transmutation circles tattooed into the palms of his hands, Kimblee can make a bomb out of anything he comes into contact with after clapping his hands. Kimblee's effectiveness allowed him to use an imperfect Philosopher's Stone to amplify his alchemical abilities, using it to wipe out Scar's family. But as the war ended, Kimblee killed his commanding officers when they attempt to take back the stone and he was sentenced to prison, as a result.^{[ch. 61]}

Kimblee is later released by the homunculi to assist in hunting down Scar and retrieving Tim Marcoh, though the Elric Brothers thwarted his attempts. Kimblee is also instructed to instigate a bloody conflict on the Drachmanian border to complete the Nationwide Transmutation Circle, feigning himself as a defector to trick the Drachma people into being led to slaughter during a full-scale attack on the fortress of Briggs.^{[ch. 79]} Kimblee later frees Pride from the earthen dome that Hohenheim trapped him in, only to be fatally wounded by his former chimera subordinates in the ensuing and consumed by Pride moments later.^{[ch. 93]} But Kimblee's sadistic nature allowed him to maintain his sense of self within Pride's stone, briefly manifesting himself to stop the homunculus from taking over Edward's body.^{[ch. 106]} Despite his crimes against humanity, Kimblee is a gentleman outside of fighting and willing to engage in philosophical discussions about morals. Kimblee has a Darwinist worldview, but he has immense respect for anyone who adheres to their principles in the face of death, as he loathes hypocrisy. During the civil war, he briefly berates a guilt-ridden Mustang for the latter's self-pity despite having freely chosen to become a state alchemist, advising him to remember the people he has killed not out of guilt, but out of accountability. His advice ultimately helps renew Mustang's resolve to aim for the top.^{[ch. 108]}

In the first anime, Kimblee escapes from prison and joins the homunculus Greed and his chimera lackeys before betraying them to be re-enlisted under Frank Archer.^{ep. 33} He later infiltrates the city of Lior to instigate an uprising against the military. Kimblee encounters Scar while destroying the city, and, after a failed effort to blow the Ishbalan up, he is brutally killed by Scar in revenge. In his final moments, Kimblee turns Alphonse into a bomb, which prompts Scar to give the boy the Philosopher's Stone, and shamelessly gloats that he did this to him so that he would reflect on how pointless his journey has become.^{ep. 42}

Kimblee is voiced by Yūji Ueda in the first Japanese series and Hiroyuki Yoshino in the second series, voiced by Eric Vale in the English adaptations.^{ep. 22} ^{ep. 22} ^{ep. 22} In the live-action film trilogy adaptation, Kimblee is portrayed by Yuki Yamada.

=== Barry the Chopper ===
Barry the Chopper (バリー・ザ・チョッパー, Barī Za Choppā) is a psychotic serial killer who appears to have foresight despite his one-track mind of wanting to chop up more people. Once infamous in Central as a butcher who committed mass murder out of a thrill, his wife being the first of his victims, Barry was captured sometime before the start of the series and reported to have been executed. In reality, Barry's soul was removed from his body and bound to a suit of armor in one of the military's experiments to serve as a guard in the 5th Laboratory under the designation Number 66. Barry encounters Alphonse when he and Edward infiltrate the lab, psychologically torturing him to get an advantage before escaping when the lab is destroyed.^{[ch. 12]} Barry was later recruited by Roy Mustang and revealed all he knew about the homunculi in exchange to help stay hidden, as Barry is the only remaining evidence of the 5th Laboratory's existence. For his on-going protection, Barry becomes fairly loyal to Mustang's group, playing a major role in helping Maria Ross escape the country and even abandoning his murders altogether. When the homunculi began tracking Barry down, Barry encounters his original human body. Explaining that returning to his body is pointless at this point as it has begun to decay, Barry instead follows it to the 3rd Laboratory to fulfill his dreams of butchering himself. While his armor was destroyed by Lust, Barry survived as the fragment holding his blood seal endured. However, his body then scratched the blood seal and it resulted in Barry's permanent demise, the body completely shutting down due to the symbiotic dependence between it and Barry's soul to coexist.^{[ch. 39]} Arakawa remarks that she enjoys drawing Barry and wanted to expand his character after dismissing her original intent to have him killed off in the 5th Laboratory's destruction.

In the first anime, Barry is shown to be much more depraved than he is in the manga, and has encountered the Elric brothers while originally human as he began his murder spree before he was ultimately captured while traumatizing and nearly killing Edward, while also threatening to kill Winry after he kidnaps her. Barry's story follows the manga up to the 5th Laboratory's destruction, but instead of redeeming himself like his manga version did, he instead gleefully becomes a mercenary to help in the slaughter of Ishbal refugees, and plots to kill Alphonse and Edward, the latter especially because he finds out that he was a State Alchemist, and blames him for his current situation. However, before he can finally get his revenge, he is ultimately ambushed and killed by Scar.^{ep. 24}

In the first anime, Kentarō Itō voices him in the Japanese series, and Jerry Jewell in the English dub.^{ep. 24} ^{ep. 24} Hideyuki Umezu voices him in the second series.^{ep. 7}

== Supporting characters ==
=== Van Hohenheim ===
Van Hohenheim (ヴァン・ホーエンハイム, Van Hōenhaimu) is the Elric brothers' estranged father with a keen knowledge of alchemy processes. He left them and his wife Trisha several years before the start of the series.^{[ch. 68]} It is later revealed that Hohenheim is several centuries old and knew Father very well. He is voiced in the first series by Masashi Ebara in Japanese and by Scott McNeil in the English dub.^{ep. 43} ^{ep. 43} In the second series, he is voiced by Unshō Ishizuka and Daisuke Namikawa (young) in Japanese and John Swasey and Aaron Dismuke (Young) in the English dub.^{ep. 19} In the mobile game adaptation, he is voiced by Kenyu Horiuchi after Ishizuka's death. In the live-action film trilogy adaptation, he is portrayed by Seiyō Uchino.

Originally a slave from the Kingdom of Cselkcess under the designation "Slave Number 23" (二十三号, Nijūsangō), Hohenheim was used for an experiment by his master, a well known scientist and alchemist, using his blood to create a shadow-like creature known as Homunculus.^{[ch. 74]} In thanks to his birth, Homunculus gave the slave the name Van Hohenheim and taught him how to read, write, and perform alchemy. As the years went on, Hohenheim's status improved and was soon close to the king. When Homunculus taught King Cselkcess how to obtain immortality, he instead gave it to Hohenheim and himself, sacrificing the citizens from Cselkcess. Possessing half of the Cselkcess citizens inside him, Hohenheim escaped in horror and tried communicating with them by the time he entered the land of Xing.^{[ch. 75]} Having played a role in Xing's development through alkahestry, Hohenheim came to Amestris where he met and married Trisha Elric. After discovering that Homunculus (now known as "Father") was going to sacrifice the inhabitants of Amestris, Hohenheim left his family to travel around the country to leave shards from his Philosopher's Stone.^{[ch. 68]} When confronting Father, Hohenheim's plans succeed as he used the shards to nullify Father's attempt to transmute the people of Amestris.^{[ch. 105]} However, after Father's defeat, Hohenheim dies peacefully in front of Trisha's grave, happy that he was able to meet her and have his sons.^{[ch. 108]}

In the first anime, where he is referred to as Hohenheim of Light (光のホーエンハイム, Hikari no Hōenhaimu), Hohenheim has used the power of a Philosopher's Stone for hundreds of years to switch from body to body, prolonging his life. He was originally Dante's lover, and left her years before the series' start. Meeting Trisha, Hohenheim decided to remain in his current body until his death occurred. However, as his body started deteriorating, he left his family. After learning of Dante's actions, Hohenheim confronts her, but is transported through the Gate of Alchemy to a parallel world based on the real world.^{ep. 50} Hohenheim is captured in Conqueror of Shamballa by the Thule Society to be used as a catalyst for the portal to Amestris. Ultimately sacrificing his life to return Edward home, Hohenheim forces himself to be fatally bitten by Envy, a homunculus that was based on his own deceased son with Dante, and used as a sacrifice to open the gate.

=== Izumi Curtis ===
Izumi Curtis (イズミ・カーティス, Izumi Kātisu) is the short-tempered, buxom and caring alchemy teacher of the Elric brothers who is also a butcher at her family business Curtis Meats. She agreed to train the brothers to hone their alchemical abilities after their mother died. She expands their training with a regimen of philosophy, martial arts, and living off the land.^{[ch. 20]} Her methods are derived from her own alchemy training: she was forced to survive in the northern region surrounding Briggs Fortress for a month (although it turns out she succeeded by stealing supplies from the northern fortress). She thinks of the Elrics as her own sons, and although she severs her student-teacher ties with them after learning of their attempts with human transmutation (and Ed's joining the State Military), she continues to do all she can to help them.^{[ch. 28]} She can be quite violent when punishing or sparring with the Elric brothers, so they tend to be deathly afraid of her.^{[ch. 25]} Her claim "I'm a housewife!" while confronting Greed became one of Arakawa's favorite scenes; she will often casually declare herself as one whenever someone asks who she is. This is due to her distaste of the alchemist profession. Izumi and her husband Sig were expecting a child years before the start of the series; however, their son was stillborn. Izumi tried and failed to revive the child through human transmutation (an act that created Wrath in the first anime). The failed attempt took some of her reproductive organs, resulting in her inability to ever again be pregnant, and to periodically vomit blood as well as leave her weak, the latter much to others' disgust. Izumi could thereafter perform alchemy without a transmutation circle, because in the failed transmutation she saw the Truth (真理, Shinri).^{[ch. 44]} Izumi attracts the attention of the State Military for having survived the failed human transmutation. As she and her husband travel around Amestris in order to avoid the military, they eventually meet Ed and Al's father Van Hohenheim. He rearranges her insides to ease the blood flow, and persuades her to help collaborate in bringing down the State Military.^{[ch. 76, 95]} Thereafter, she is never again seen coughing up blood. She has a tattoo of a Flamel on her left breast.

In the first anime adaptation, she was taught alchemy by Dante. Izumi tries to get close to Wrath in order to repent for the creation of him. She dies between the end of the first anime and Conqueror of Shamballa, but, during the movie, her spirit reunites with Wrath in the afterlife. She is voiced by Shōko Tsuda in Japanese and Christine Auten in the English dub.^{ep. 26} ^{ep. 26} In the live-action film trilogy adaptation, Izumi is portrayed by Haruhi Ryо̄ga.

=== Sig Curtis ===
Sig Curtis (シグ・カーティス, Shigu Kātisu) is the burly husband of Izumi and proprietor of Curtis Meats. When Izumi trained the Elric brothers, Sig was often the voice of reason. While Sig can't perform alchemy like Izumi, he is shown to have great fighting skills as seen when he took down most of the Chimeras at the Devil's Nest.^{[ch. 28]}^{[ch. 44]}

He is voiced by Seiji Sasaki in the Japanese version of the anime and by Bob Carter in the English dub.

=== Tim Marcoh ===
Tim Marcoh (ティム・マルコー, Timu Marukō), formerly the "Crystal Alchemist" (結晶の錬金術師, Kesshō no Renkinjutsushi), was the leading researcher in the military's Philosopher's Stone creation project. After sacrificing a number of innocent Ishbalans during the Ishbal Civil War in order to create new stones, he fled the military with some imperfect stone samples. He settled down in a small country town where he uses his stones to heal the sick. He is later found by the Elric brothers, and he directs them to some of the research he left behind in Central to help them in their search for the Philosopher's Stone.^{[ch. 8]} Marcoh is then captured by the homunculi who locked him deep below Central before he was found by Scar. Marcoh saw Scar as a means to an end while telling him of his involvement in the Ishbalan War in the hopes of being killed in vengeance. Scar instead disfigures Marcoh's face beyond recognition as a disguise, kidnaps him, and forces him to help in bringing down the homunculi.^{[ch. 62]} After Father's defeat, Marcoh offers to restore Mustang's eyesight in return of allowing the surviving Ishbalans to return to their homeland with him placed there as a doctor.^{[ch. 108]}

In the first anime and live-action film, while being held in military custody, Marcoh is killed by the homunculi in an attempt to silence him.^{ep. 50}

Kōji Totani voices him in the Japanese series, while Brice Armstrong voices him in the English dub.^{ep. 14} ^{ep. 14} Masayuki Omoro voices him in the second anime, while Jerry Russell voices him in the English dub.^{ep. 6} In live-action, he is portrayed by Jun Kunimura.

=== Roy Mustang's squadron ===
Roy Mustang and his subordinates. Also in the photograph are Maes Hughes and Alex Louis Armstrong.

==== Riza Hawkeye ====
First Lieutenant Riza Hawkeye (リザ・ホークアイ, Riza Hōkuai) is Roy Mustang's most trusted and dearest subordinate. She often carries out many of the tasks he is too lazy to do, acts as his personal assistant, and protects him from danger.^{[ch. 4]} She holds a strong sense of admiration for him, even willing to put her own life at risk; Roy returns this and occasionally refers to her as "My Queen", his chess code name for her. She also doubles as his voice of reason, keeping cool in heated situations, and scolding him when he allows his emotions to get in the way. Riza and Roy seem to share a close relationship as she identifies him as her most precious person.^{[ch. 39]} Riza specializes in firearms, particularly sniper rifles, and can hit nearly any target with lethal accuracy.^{[ch. 7]} In the series, she adopts a dog named Black Hayate (ブラックハヤテ, Burakkuhayate) from Kain Fuery that she raises with stern discipline; when Hayate urinates indoors, she fires a number of warning rounds at the wall around the dog to reinforce that doing so is against established protocol.^{[vol. 3:Gaiden]}

In the form of a tattoo on her back, Riza bears the final notes to her father's work on Flame Alchemy, and his legacy as an alchemist and Mustang's teacher. After seeing what Mustang was capable of during the Ishbal War with such ability, Riza begs Roy to burn the tattoo, fearing the damage future flame alchemists could cause.^{[ch. 61]} Riza is reassigned as King Bradley's personal assistant to be used as a hostage when Mustang learns the homunculi control the State.^{[ch. 52]} When she discovers that King Bradley's adopted son, Selim, is a homunculus as well, she sends her discovery to Mustang in code as soon as she can. She eventually defects from the military to help Mustang overthrow King Bradley.^{[ch. 74]} Arakawa received various questions regarding the future of her relationship with Mustang and commented that, while Hawkeye stays with Mustang, a marriage may be possible despite military regulations.

In the first anime, she is voiced by Michiko Neya in Japanese and by Colleen Clinkenbeard in English.^{ep. 5} ^{ep. 5} In the second anime, she is voiced by Fumiko Orikasa ^{ep. 1} while in the English version, Colleen Clinkenbeard came back for the role. In the live-action film, she is portrayed by Misako Renbutsu.

==== Jean Havoc ====
Second Lieutenant Jean Havoc (ジャン・ハボック, Jan Habokku) is one of Roy Mustang's most trusted subordinates. His chess code name is "The Knight". He is usually seen smoking a cigarette, something that Arakawa developed prior to the series' start to help Mustang to create fire to fight homunculus Lust. He was recruited by Mustang for his loyalty and general sincerity, as well as his above-average shooting skills. Because working for Mustang requires moving frequently and complete dedication of time, Havoc has very little free time, and cannot maintain a relationship with a woman for very long.^{[ch. 61]} He unknowingly dates Lust, who tries to extract information about Mustang from him.^{[ch. 38]} She is unsuccessful and eventually reveals her true identity to him. In the course of the attempt to kill her, Havoc is severely injured when Lust stabs him through the spinal cord, leaving the lower half of his body completely paralyzed.^{[ch. 41]} Havoc is then encouraged to find another way to help their cause and later provides his support by supplying Mustang with whatever supplies they may need from his family's store.^{[ch. 89]} In the second anime, he is healed by Marcoh's Philosopher's Stone.

In the first anime, Yasunori Matsumoto is his Japanese voice actor, and Mike McFarland his English voice actor.^{ep. 13} ^{ep. 13} In Brotherhood, he is voiced by Yūji Ueda in Japanese, with Mike McFarland reprising his role in English.^{ep. 13}

==== Heymans Breda ====
Second Lieutenant Heymans Breda (ハイマンス・ブレダ, Haimansu Bureda) is one of Roy Mustang's most trusted subordinates. His chess code name is "The Rook". He was recruited by Mustang for his high level of intelligence, indicated by his talent with chess and other strategy games. Despite his intelligence, he still has an irrational fear of dogs. Breda is usually tasked by Mustang with jobs that require he travel abroad. He is transferred to Western Headquarters when Mustang's group is broken up by the homunculi.^{[ch. 61]} In the manga, he eventually defects from the military so that he can help Mustang overthrow King Bradley.

In the first anime, Tomoyuki Shimura voices him in Japanese, and Josh Berry in English.^{ep. 13} ^{ep. 13} In Brotherhood, he is voiced by Biichi Satou in Japanese, and Jeremy Inman in English.

==== Vato Falman ====
Warrant Officer Vato Falman (ヴァトー・ファルマン, Vatō Faruman) is one of Roy Mustang's most trusted subordinates. His chess code name is "The Bishop". He was recruited by Mustang for his innate ability to remember almost every detail, allowing him to act as a sort of recording device that does not leave any physical evidence. Because his intellect is his area of expertise, he does not have much experience in the field, causing him to make rookie mistakes when in a combat situation. He is overly formal, causing some of his comrades to wish he would lighten up. Falman does not play a large role in the first anime, only being another of Mustang's subordinates.^{[ch. 61]} Falman is transferred to Northern Headquarters when Mustang's group is broken up by the homunculi. He is subsequently transferred again, this time to Briggs' Fortress where he is given what amounts to janitorial duties. There, he reunites with the Elric brothers and helps them and Briggs' forces plan against the homunculi.^{[ch. 23, 65]} A running gag with Falman is that his promotion to Second Lieutenant is continuously forgotten by other characters.

In the first anime, he is voiced by Takehiro Murozono in Japanese, and by Kyle Hebert in English.^{ep. 5} ^{ep. 5} In Brotherhood, he is voiced by Kenji Hamada.^{ep. 13}

==== Kain Fuery ====
Sergeant Major Kain Fuery (ケイン・フュリー, Kein Fyurī) is one of Roy Mustang's most trusted subordinates. His chess code name is "The Pawn". He is overly kind in nature, both to people and to animals. He was recruited by Mustang for his technological expertise. As such, he primarily helps Mustang with communications, both in creating secure lines and tapping into others. He is transferred to Southern Headquarters when Mustang's group is broken up by the homunculi. He eventually defects from the military so that he can help Mustang overthrow King Bradley.^{[ch. 61]}

In the first anime, his Japanese voice actor is Tetsu Shiratori, and his English voice actor is Kevin M. Connolly.^{ep. 13} In Brotherhood, he is voiced by Tetsuya Kakihara.^{ep. 13}

=== State Military ===
The State Military (アメストリス軍部, Amesutorisu Gunbu) is Amestris' primary mode of offense and defense. Throughout the history of the country, it has existed to put down uprisings and annex surrounding hostile countries into its borders. It is led by King Bradley, and uses a ranking system common of most real-world militaries.^{[ch. 1]} The State Military is basically just the puppet force called upon to further the homunculi's plans.^{[ch. 67]} Many of the soldiers' names are taken from the makers of fighter aircraft and airplanes.^{p.176}

==== Alex Louis Armstrong ====
Major Alex Louis Armstrong (アレックス・ルイ・アームストロング, Arekkusu Rui Āmusutorongu), the "Strong Arm Alchemist" (豪腕の錬金術師, Gōwan no Renkinjutsushi), is a tall, large and comically emotional State Alchemist who will burst into tears or joyous praise, given the right situation, and embraces others in an effort to console them. Because of his extremely muscular build, this usually causes great personal injury to others. Armstrong is very proud of his strength and of his muscular physique, frequently taking off his shirt so that he can flex to show off. As a final element of his comedic properties, he has the tendency to "sparkle", a trait apparently shared by the rest of his family; when first appearing in a scene or taking off his shirt, pink stars radiate from his body.^{[ch. 4]} Despite his humorous tendencies, Armstrong can be very serious when the situation calls for it. He is not fond of violence and will try to end conflicts peacefully, and will break down and cry if an innocent person is killed.^{[ch. 29]}

Armstrong comes from a wealthy family of aristocrats who has earned renown in most professions. He has mastered many of his family's talents for himself, and when displaying such a talent, he brags and remarks it to have been "passed down the Armstrong line for generations." His alchemical skills also represent a remnant of his family's history; by using a unique kind of cestus, Armstrong can reshape any solid object that he punches.^{[ch. 7]} Armstrong is a valuable ally of Roy Mustang and the Elric brothers, even if they are not always happy to be in his emotional company. He takes his honor as a soldier and as a leader seriously, and always looks out for his peers' and subordinates' best interests.^{[ch. 20]} He is voiced by Kenji Utsumi in the Japanese series, and Christopher Sabat in the English adaptation.^{ep. 14} ^{ep. 14} In the mobile game adaptation, he is voiced by Jirō Saitō after Utsumi's death. In the live-action film trilogy adaptation, Armstrong is portrayed by Kōji Yamamoto.

==== Olivier Mira Armstrong ====
Major General Olivier Mira Armstrong (オリヴィエ・ミラ・アームストロング, Orivie Mira Āmusutorongu) is the older sister of Alex Louis Armstrong. She is charged with leading Briggs' Fortress (ブリッグズ要塞, Burigguzu Yōsai), and protecting the country from the neighboring country of Drachma (ドラクマ, Dorakuma). Unlike her brother, who is cheerful and rather emotional, Olivier is stoic and distrusts everyone when she first meets them; she has no patience for formalities or idle conversation. She is also, similarly, a firm believer in survival of the fittest. This has earned Olivier a reputation within the military, and in Drachma, as one who should not be crossed, though her subordinates hold her in high regard. Because she readily joins them in hostile situations and disregards the orders of superiors if she disagrees, her subordinates will answer only to her. Despite her cold attitude, she is heavily implied to care greatly for her subordinates and family, and in rare instances shows some emotion before reverting to her usual personality. She always carries a sword at her side, and is proficient enough to be able to defeat her brother in combat.^{[ch. 65, 83]}

Olivier crosses paths with the Elric brothers when they arrive at Briggs' Fortress. After Sloth infiltrates Briggs, she is able to convince them to tell her about the homunculi that control the military.^{[ch. 67]} To help the Elric brothers combat the corrupt higher-ups, Olivier goes to Central to work her way into King Bradley's inner circle. Once she learns of plans to create an army of immortal super-soldiers, Olivier fights against the homunculi. Although she has no direct control of Briggs, her subordinates still operate it under her wishes, eventually sneaking into Central to help Olivier take control of the government.^{[ch. 95, 97]} Her most loyal soldiers include Miles (マイルズ, Mairuzu), who is a quarter Ishbalan, remaining in the military with the hope to someday change the country's perception of Ishbal; and Buccaneer (バッカニア, Bakkania), a large, heavyset man who has been shown with two different pieces of automail in the series.^{[ch. 65]} Buccaneer fights Bradley together along with the resistance, but he dies in battle.^{[ch. 100]}

Her Japanese voice actress is Yōko Sōmi,^{ep. 33} while her English voice actress is Stephanie Young. In the live-action film trilogy adaptation, Armstrong is portrayed by Chiaki Kuriyama.

==== Maes Hughes ====
Lieutenant Colonel Maes Hughes (マース・ヒューズ, Māsu Hyūzu) is an old friend of Roy Mustang. He works in the military's intelligence division but spends much of his time using the military phone lines to brag to Mustang about his family. After his daughter, Elicia, is born, he fawns about how cute and talented she is and bombards others with pictures of her when he sees them. Despite his over-the-top comical tendencies, Hughes is a valuable ally to Mustang's goal of becoming Führer, supplying whatever classified intelligence that may be beneficial. He has also been shown to be a capable fighter, skilled with throwing knives. His general understanding of others' emotions and desire to help them similarly gains the affection of the Elric brothers and their friend Winry Rockbell, as he always offers advice or hospitality to them when they need it.^{[ch. 14]} During one of his attempts to help the Elrics, Hughes learns of the homunculi's Nationwide Transmutation Circle plan over the country; in the 2003 anime series, he learns of all the corruption personally plaguing the military for the sake of creating a Philosopher's Stone, with the key suspect, Juliet Douglas, being the final nail in the coffin. However, he is found out and wounded by Lust, forcing him to retreat and call Mustang, only to be confronted by Envy, disguised as Maria Ross. Shapeshifting into Hughes' wife, Gracia, Envy shoots and kills Hughes before he can attack.^{[ch. 15]} This leads Mustang to further investigate the truth for himself, in hopes of finding his friend's killer.^{[ch. 16]} In the 2003 anime series, he instead investigates the corruption and institution that got Hughes killed in the first place, respecting Hughes' wishes of being a better man and not seeking vengeance. His death as described by Arakawa was the moment where "everyone who read it cried" and so she had to apologize to readers and her assistant for such an event. In the Japanese series he is voiced by Keiji Fujiwara, and in the English dub by Sonny Strait.^{ep. 5} ^{ep. 5} In the mobile game adaptation, he is voiced by Kenjiro Tsuda after Fujiwara's death. In the live-action film adaptation, he is portrayed by Ryuta Sato.

==== Denny Brosh and Maria Ross ====
Sergeant Denny Brosh (デニー・ブロッシュ, Denī Burosshu) and Second Lieutenant Maria Ross (マリア・ロス, Maria Rosu) are introduced when they are assigned to protect Edward Elric.^{[ch. 10]} While Brosh is rather nosy and lazy, Ross is serious about her job. Ross is framed by the homunculi for the death of Maes Hughes.^{[ch. 30]} Roy Mustang stages a prison break and then fakes her death, giving her a chance to flee to Xing. Before leaving, she asks that her family and Brosh not be told that she is alive so as to keep the secret from getting out.^{[ch. 41]} To repay Mustang for saving her life, Ross later returns to Amestris and helps him wage an assault on Central.^{[ch. 89]} In the first anime, Brosh and Ross later appear in the rebellion against King Bradley, saving various characters from execution. Brosh is voiced by Masao Harada in the Japanese version of the first series, Yuki Hayashi in the second, and Jim Foronda in the English dubs of both series.^{ep. 18} ^{ep. 18} Ross is voiced in Japanese by Mitsuki Saiga in the first series and Kaori Nazuka in the second, and by Meredith McCoy in English.^{ep. 18} ^{ep. 18} In the live-action film she is portrayed by Natsuna Watanabe.

==== Sheska ====
Sheska (シェスカ, Shesuka) is a librarian at the First Branch of the Central City Library. Because she spent all day reading the many documents stored there, instead of doing her job, she was fired. She has a photographic memory and can remember and reproduce anything she has ever read, with word-for-word accuracy. Because of this, after the library burns down, the Elric brothers seek her out to see if she can remember any research papers by Tim Marcoh. She transcribes the entirety of his research for them, earning enough pay to last her a year for her troubles. When Maes Hughes learns of how she helped the Elrics, he hires her to help recreate the criminal records that were destroyed in the fire.^{[ch. 10]}

In the first anime, after Hughes' death, Sheska is dismayed to learn that Mustang suspended the investigation of it and increasingly starts to resent him. She later gives him all the materials that Hughes had been investigating while personally conducting her own investigation into Hughes' death. She soon meets and befriends the Elric brothers' friend Winry Rockbell, and helps her discover the identity of Sloth, whom Sheska at first mistakes as an alien. Sheska and Winry are then attacked by Sloth but saved by Lieutenant Maria Ross and Sergeant Denny Brosh. The two then flee to Resembool where Sheska remains in hiding until it is safe to return to the military. Upon telling the Elrics the truth about Hughes' death and Mustang's true kinder nature for peace in the government, it is at this moment where Sheska and Winry eventually gained respect and admiration for Mustang. Once Sheska returns to the military following the death of King Bradley, she later learns from Winry that Al was restored to normal but Ed was taken to the parallel universe as a consequence for reviving him. In the movie, Conqueror of Shamballa, Sheska, Winry and Al reunite with Ed, but the girls are sad to watch the boys leave for good in the end. Naomi Wakabayashi voices her in the first anime, and Gwendolyn Lau in the English dub.^{ep. 18} Her voice in the second series is provided by Chika Fujimura.^{ep. 7}

=== Yoki ===
Yoki (ヨキ), when first introduced, is a corrupt member of the military who imposes heavy taxes on the town of Youswell, bankrupting its citizens. He is assisted by two men, who would attack anyone who insults or threatens him if ordered. When the Elric brothers arrive in town, they trick Yoki into giving up ownership of the town and promptly report his actions to the military.^{[ch. 3]} He is stripped of his rank and lives as a homeless person unsuccessfully finding work on the outskirts of Central where he ends up working for Scar out of initial fear for his life. Though he tries to convince those they encounter that Scar is his servant, Yoki does as Scar commands and calls him "master". Since he has started following Scar around the country, Yoki has assumed a role as comic relief, often having pain inflicted upon him when he tries to seem superior to others.^{[ch. 33]} In the first anime, Yoki alerts the military to Scar's location to regain his position and is covertly killed by Lust in the subsequent raid. Kazuki Yao voices him in Japanese, and Barry Yandell in English.^{ep. 9} ^{ep. 9}

=== Chimera ===
A Chimera (合成獣(キメラ), kimera; Japanese literally "composite beast") is an alchemical fusion between two or more beings.^{[ch. 1]} A vast majority of Chimera seen in Fullmetal Alchemist are a cross between multiple animals.

==== Human Chimeras ====
There are a version of Chimeras that are humans who have been alchemically crossed with an animal. These experiments, performed in secret by the State Military to dispose of injured soldiers or those that have taken part in secret missions, endow the human with abilities reminiscent of the animal.^{[ch. 27]}

===== Nina Tucker and Alexander =====
Nina Tucker (ニーナ・タッカー, Nīna Takkā) is the daughter of Shou Tucker. Alexander (アレクサンダー, Arekusandā) is Nina and Shou's pet Pyrenean Mountain Dog. During the Elric brothers' visit to him, Edward and Alphonse spent time with Nina where a running gag had Alexander tackling Edward. Shou would later use his specialty in Chimeras to fuse Nina and Alexander into a human Chimera. This action got Shou placed under house arrest by the State Military. After killing Shou and the guards watching him, Scar states to the Nina/Alexander Chimera that the process is irreversible and euthanizes them.

The 2003 anime had the Nina/Alexander Chimera running out into the streets and getting killed by Scar amidst Shou's arrest. Later on, Shou ends up accidentally turned into a human Chimera upon fusing with an unspecified canid and having made clones of Nina in order to find a way to revive her.

Nina Tucker is voiced by Satomi Kōrogi in the 2003 version of the Japanese anime and by Sumire Morohoshi in the 2009 version of the Japanese anime. In the English dub, she is voiced by Brina Palencia.

===== Greed's Human Chimeras =====
A group of human Chimeras who work for the homunculus Greed during the series.

- Bido (ビドー, Bidō) is a human Chimera who was crossed with a gecko, giving him the tail, scales, agility, and climbing abilities of a gecko. Bido is primarily tasked with intelligence gathering and relies on others to defend him.^{[ch. 25]} After the raid caused by King Bradley, he encounters Lin Yao, the new Greed, who, having no recollections of Bido, kills him. His death later triggers Greed's memories and leaves him distraught and enraged, prompting him to find King Bradley to avenge his friends' deaths.^{[ch. 82]} In the first anime, he is killed during the military's attempt to capture Greed. Bido is voiced by Tōru Ōkawa in the 2003 version of the Japanese anime and by Yūji Ueda in the 2009 version of the Japanese anime. In the English dub, he is voiced by Greg Ayres.
- Dolcetto (ドルチェット, Doruchetto; "Dorochet" in the first English anime) is a human Chimera who was crossed with a dog, giving him an enhanced sense of smell and an unwavering loyalty to Greed. His weapon is a katana. Dolcetto and Loa are killed by King Bradley while trying to defend Greed. In the 2003 version, he and Loa were killed by Lust and Gluttony while covering for Greed to escape from being sealed away by his homunculi brethren and his creator, Dante. Dolcetto is voiced by Yasunori Matsumoto in the 2003 version of the Japanese anime and by Anri Tatsu in the 2009 version of the Japanese anime. In the English dub, he is voiced by John Burgmeier.
- Loa (ロア, Roa; "Law" in the first English anime and "Roa" in the second) is a human Chimera who was crossed with an ox, giving him the horns and strength of an ox. His weapon is a warhammer. Loa and Dolcetto are killed by King Bradley while trying to defend Greed. In the 2003 version, he and Dolcetto are killed by Lust and Gluttony while covering for Greed to escape from being sealed away by his homunculi brethren and his creator, Dante. Loa is voiced by Yūji Ueda in the 2003 version of the Japanese anime and by Tetsu Inada in the 2009 version of the Japanese anime. In the English dub, he is voiced by John Gremillion.
- Martel (マーテル, Māteru; "Marta" in the first English anime) is a human Chimera who was crossed with a snake, allowing her to stretch and contort her body to great effect. She uses this ability to infiltrate Alphonse Elric's body and control it from the inside. During King Bradley's raid of the Devil's Nest to capture Greed, Martel attempts to attack Bradley while inside Al's armor, only for Bradley to stab through Al and kill her.^{[ch. 30]} In the first anime, Martel survives the raid and accompanies Al in his various endeavors. She is ultimately killed by Bradley in the same way as in the manga, though not before informing Al that Bradley is a homunculus.^{ep. 40} Martel is voiced by Rumi Kasahara in the 2003 version of the Japanese anime and by Takako Honda in the 2009 version of the Japanese anime. In the English dub, she is voiced by Tiffany Grant.
- Ulchi (ウルチ, Uruchi) is a human Chimera who was crossed with a crocodile, giving him the strength, armored hide, and jaw strength of a crocodile. Ulchi is killed by King Bradley's soldiers during an attack on the Devil's Nest. In both anime adaptions, Ulchi is treated as a minor character with his Chimera status still intact.

===== Solf J. Kimblee's Human Chimeras =====
A total of four human Chimeras were created by Solf J. Kimblee from his bodyguards. Unlike Greed's Human Chimeras, these Human Chimeras have more animal-like forms.

- The first pair, Zanpano (ザンパノ; "Zampano" in the anime) and Jelso (ジェルソ, Jeruso; "Jerso" in the anime) are tasked with capturing Scar before deciding to defect and side with Alphonse and Scar's group. Zanpano is a Chimera who was crossed with a razorback, giving him the thick skin, tusks, quills, and increased strength of a razorback. Jelso is a Chimera who was crossed with a frogfish, giving him the ability to generate mucus with explosive and paralytic properties. Zanpano and Jelso aid the Elrics in stopping Father and later accompany Al to Xing to find a cure for their Chimera condition.^{[ch. 72,73]} Zanpano is voiced by Takashi Hikida in the 2009 version of the Japanese anime and by Chris Rager in the English dub. Jelso is voiced by Tomuyuki Shimura in the 2009 version of the Japanese anime and by Andrew Love in the English dub.
- Zanpano and Jelso's fellow Chimeras, Darius (ダリウス, Dariusu) and Heinkel (ハインケル, Hainkeru), aid Edward after Kimblee nearly kills them in apprehending the Fullmetal Alchemist. Darius is a Chimera who was crossed with a gorilla, giving him the increased strength and fur of a gorilla. Darius is a Chimera who was crossed with a lion, giving him the fangs, claws, enhanced vision, and predatory speed of a lion. Darius and Heinkel aid the Elrics in stopping Father and later become Yoki's traveling companions. The ending implies that Darius, Heinkel, and Yoki joined a circus.^{[ch. 77]} Darius is voiced by Masuo Amada in the 2009 version of the Japanese anime and by George Manley in the English dub. Heinkel is voiced by Shinpachi Tsuji in the 2009 version of the Japanese anime and by Bradley Campbell in the English dub.

=== Ishbal ===
The Ishbalans (イシュヴァール人, Ishuvāru-jin; "Ishvalans" in the second anime) are a religious people, characterized by their brown skin and red eyes. Their God is named "Ishballah" ("Ishvala" in the second anime). The majority of their population was slaughtered by the State Military during the Ishbalan Civil War. The few survivors live as criminals and refugees in various slums across the country, usually leaping at the opportunity to fight against Amestrians.^{[ch. 7]} With the help of Ishbalan refugees, the corrected transmutation circle was activated by Scar and helped return powers to the Alchemists.^{[ch. 105]} Mustang and his team promised Marcoh to return the Ishbalan's their land following the final battle and reverse any anti-Ishbalan policies in effect, as well as grant Marcoh free rein to practice medicine again for the Ishbalans. Scar was also implied to have been granted amnesty afterward, as a photo shows him living as a Warrior Priest again.^{[ch. 108]} Similarly, in the first anime, the reformed Amestris give the Ishbalan people their land back after King Bradley's death.^{ep. 51}

=== Xing ===
Xing (シン国, Shin-koku) is a country far away from Amestris. Its people are Asian in appearance and are split into fifty clans under the rule of a single emperor who fathered a child in each family. In the current storyline, the emperor is in failing health, and his children (of which there are 43, 7 implied to have been assassinated if not die of natural causes), whose families are not in good standing with one another, seek to earn his recognition in his final days. Two of his children, Prince Lin Yao and Princess May Chang, go to Amestris in separate attempts to find the fabled Philosopher's Stone and gain immortality, hoping that doing so will convince the emperor to make them his successor.^{[ch. 32]} Those who come from Xing, due to their ability to sense qi, are able to identify a homunculus and sense the presence of numerous souls in one place. Many Xingese residents are also skilled in alkahestry (錬丹術, rentanjutsu; "purification arts"), an alchemy technique developed by Hohenheim that functions differently from Amestrian alchemy.

==== Xiao Mei ====
Xiao Mei (シャオメイ, Shao Mei; "Shao May" in the English anime, Chinese for "little beauty") is May Chang's small pet panda. She is voiced by Rie Kugimiya in Japanese and by Tia Ballard in English.

==== Fu ====
Fu (フー, Fū; "Foo" in the Japanese manga) is one of Lin Yao's bodyguards. He is an older man and the grandfather of Lin's other bodyguard, Lan Fan. Though committed to his duties and stern in nature, he cries for his granddaughter after learning that she sacrificed her arm for their prince. He leaves his prince's side for an extended period of time when helping Maria Ross escape to Xing, and again when taking Lan Fan to get automail surgery.^{[ch. 41]} Despite this, Fu remains deeply loyal to his prince and is determined to bring back to Xing, Lin and the immortality he has gained.^{[ch. 63]} While facing King Bradley in battle along with Ling, Greed, Buccaneer, Falman, and the military, he is killed by the homunculus in a failed suicide attack of exploding himself along with him. However, his efforts were not in vain, as a mortally wounded Buccaneer takes advantage of Bradley's blind spot by stabbing through Fu's body to wound him with his sword.^{[ch. 99]} He is voiced by Katsunosuke Hori in Japanese and Kenny Green in English.^{ep. 15} In the mobile game adaptation, he is voiced by Minoru Inaba.

==== Lan Fan ====
Lan Fan (ランファン, Ranfan; "Ranfun" in the Japanese manga) is one of Lin Yao's bodyguards. She is the granddaughter of Lin's other bodyguard, Fu, and is implied by Lin to be younger than Lin is. She is a skilled fighter despite her age and can keep up with or defend against seasoned warriors. She is fiercely protective of her prince, and instantly attacks anyone who speaks poorly of him.^{[ch. 34]} This makes for a weakness in battle; by insulting Lin in some way, her opponent can break her usually perfect battle form and leave her open to attack. While protecting Lin, Lan Fan is severely injured by King Bradley, having to amputate her arm in order to escape. After regaining consciousness, she and her grandfather leave Lin so that she can get automail surgery to replace her arm.^{[ch. 63]} The moment her surgery is complete and she has recovered to the point of being able to move (though not to the point of having complete control of her new arm), she rushes to Lin's side to start protecting him once again.^{[ch. 87]} Her Japanese voice actress is Nana Mizuki and her English voice actress is Trina Nishimura.^{ep. 15}

== Other characters ==
=== Pinako Rockbell ===
Pinako Rockbell (ピナコ・ロックベル, Pinako Rokkuberu) is the paternal grandmother of Winry Rockbell, and also a surgeon and weaponsmith living and working in the town of Resembool in the eastern region of Amestris. Mixing her two specialties, Pinako is also a prominent automail engineer and presumably the founder of Rockbell Automail, a family-run automail atelier within the town. Pinako also happens to be the neighbor and close family friend of the Elrics - Van Hohenheim, Trisha, Edward and Alphonse. As Winry's only remaining blood relative after the death of her parents, and the closest adult to the Elric brothers after their mother's death and their father's disappearance, Pinako acts as caretaker to the three youngsters, training Winry in automail engineering and serving as Ed and Al's home base whenever they return to Resembool.^{[ch. 9]}

Her Japanese voice actresses are Miyoko Asō in the old version and Mami Koyama in the young version.^{ep. 17} In the English adaptation, her voice actresses are Juli Erickson in the old version and Shelley Calene-Black in the young version.^{ep. 27} ^{ep. 27}

=== Trisha Elric ===
Trisha Elric (トリシャ・エルリック, Torisha Erurikku) is the deceased mother of Edward and Alphonse Elric. Her husband Van Hohenheim leaves her and their two sons behind to find a way to escape his immortality and achieve this goal.^{[ch. 68]} Trisha tries to last until his return, though she ultimately dies of an illness.^{[ch. 85]} Ed and Al attempt to revive her with human transmutation, but instead create a malformed entity that dies within moments of being created.^{ch.23} Hohenheim would later plant the suggestion that the creature was not the actual Trisha, leading to the conclusion it was Alphonse possessing an artificially created body momentarily after losing his own.^{[ch. 43, 45]} In the first anime series, the failed creation becomes the homunculus Sloth.^{ep. 42} Her Japanese voice actress is Yoshino Takamori and Yuuki Mitsugi (young), and her English voice actress is Lydia Mackay and Tia Ballard (young).^{ep. 2} ^{ep. 2} In the live-action film adaptation, Trisha is portrayed by Kaoru Hirata.

=== Slicer Brothers ===
Two serial killer brothers who are made to guard the 5th Laboratory, and like Barry The Chopper, have their souls attached to a suit of armor, called Number 48. Although they are brothers, their souls are bound to the same armor, the older brother to the helmet, the younger brother to the rest of the armor. Like Barry the Chopper, the government pretended to execute them two years earlier. Edward Elric manages to defeat them both but refuses to kill them because he believes they are still human. Lust kills the older brother before he can tell Edward who they work for, and the younger brother is killed by Envy.

Slicer Brothers are voiced by Shinya Ohtaki as the older brother and Koichi Sakaguchi as the younger brother in the 2003 Anime and Dai Matsumoto as the older brother and Kenji Nojima as the younger brother in the 2009 anime in Japanese and Bill Jenkins as the older brother and Duncan Brannan as the younger brother in the 2003 and 2009 Anime in English

=== Rosé Thomas ===
Rosé Thomas (ロゼ・トーマス, Roze Tōmasu; also spelled "Rose") is a young woman introduced at the very start of the series. She is a devout believer in her town's local faith, believing that serving the Church of Leto would bring her dead boyfriend back to life. The Elric brothers' arrival in town opens Rosé's eyes to the church's corruption and forces her to realize her boyfriend cannot be resurrected.^{[ch. 2]} Following the riots in her town caused by the upheaval of the church's authority, she helps to rebuild the town by being the cook for those working the reconstruction, eventually reuniting with Alphonse Elric.^{[ch. 80]} In a monologue to Winry, Rose explains that she and the townsfolk will now actively work for their future rather than passively get by and just wait for a miracle to happen, a lesson she credits to the Elrics. In the first anime as a major role, she instead becomes the mute "Holy Mother" of the townspeople, giving them a symbol of guidance as they rise up against the State Military. Rosé loses her voice after being captured by a soldier of the military; it is strongly implied that it was caused by a traumatic experience from being raped by the soldiers or at least one of the guerillas, as she now has a baby.^{ep. 41} Rosé later regained her ability to speak prior to being captured by Dante, who intended to use her as a new vessel once obtaining the Philosopher's Stone. But Rosé is freed by Edward as she escapes with her baby. Her voice actress in Japanese is Houko Kuwashima in the first series, and Satsuki Yukino in the second.^{ep. 3} Colleen Clinkenbeard voices her in the English series.^{ep. 1}

=== Truth ===
Truth (真理, Shinri) is a mysterious being/deity who lives in another plane of existence as the overseer and enforcer of alchemy's universal laws, going by many names that include God, The Universe, The World, All, and One. Appearing as a silhouetted reflection of whoever appears before it, the Truth takes those who attempt Human Transmutation to its domain, where it grants them knowledge while taking what they most cherish or of equal value. Despite its ruthlessness, defined by the Father as an arbiter of order that puts the arrogant in their place, the Truth desires to teach alchemists humility and acceptance of their current situation while punishing those who intentionally seek its power. After Father is defeated, Truth punishes him by having the Gate of Truth absorb him, stripping him of his individuality and freedom. When Edward gives up his ability to perform alchemy to bring Alphonse back to their world, the Truth proudly congratulates Edward for learning the lesson and accepts the exchange, while wishing him farewell, noting that he said the correct answer.

Truth's voice in the Japanese version of Fullmetal Alchemist: Brotherhood is dependent on the character that appears before it. In the English version, the Truth is voiced by Luci Christian, Maxey Whitehead, and Vic Mignogna.

== Anime-only characters ==
=== Dante ===
Dante (ダンテ) is an anime-only character and the main antagonist of the first anime adaptation. She is the former lover of Hohenheim and has used Philosopher's Stones to transfer her soul to new bodies for around four hundred years. Several centuries prior to the series, she and Hohenheim had a son together who died of mercury poisoning and was made into the homunculus, Envy. However, Hohenheim realized how corrupted Dante had become and left her, leaving behind only a small fragment of a Philosopher's Stone which she quickly used up. Dante leads the homunculi, either creating them herself, or finding them after they are created, and uses them to create conflicts in the hope of having a desperate alchemist create a new stone for her. She first appears as an elderly woman, who is the former alchemy teacher of Izumi Curtis. She fakes her death at the hands of Greed, and later reveals herself to have transferred her soul to the body of her student Lyra (ライラ, Raira), a young girl who had wished to become a State Alchemist.^{ep. 45} ^{ep. 32} She is eventually killed by Gluttony, whom she reduced to a feral state to further her own purposes.^{ep. 51} She is voiced by Kazuko Sugiyama in the Japanese series, and by Cindee Mayfield in the English series. As Lyra, she is voiced by Yumi Kakazu in the Japanese series,^{ep. 22} and by Monica Rial in the English series.^{ep. 22}

=== Russell and Fletcher Tringham ===
Russell Tringham (ラッセル・トリンガム, Rasseru Toringamu) and his younger brother Fletcher (フレッチャー・トリンガム, Furecchā Toringamu) are the sons of the famed alchemist Nash Tringham. Their characters are adapted by the first anime from the light novel The Land of Sand, not the manga. They seek to complete their father's research with a substance known as "red water" (赤い水, akai mizu), a toxic liquid with alchemical properties. To help them in this endeavor, they impersonate the Elric brothers to gain access to resources and locations reserved for State Alchemists. While Fletcher is reluctant to do this, Russell insists that nobody will mind.^{ep. 12} They are almost executed towards the end of the first anime when they are mistaken for the real Elric brothers, who are wanted for treason, and, after being saved, they try to help Ed find out about the homunculi. Although Edward and Russell fight near constantly, Fletcher and Alphonse are able to get along. The two Tringham brothers tend to utilize alchemy involving plants.^{ep. 49} Russell is voiced by Kosuke Okano in the Japanese series, and Justin Cook in the English adaptation. Fletcher is voiced by Minako Arakawa in Japanese,^{ep. 12} and by Avery Williams in the English adaptation.^{ep. 12}

=== Frank Archer ===
Frank Archer (フランク・アーチャー, Furanku Āchā) is a character exclusive to the first anime, introduced as Maes Hughes' replacement. He is cool, calm, and collected, with a love for violence and war. He dreams of becoming a hero on the battlefield, viewing it as a way to rise up the ranks of the military. To this end, he does whatever is necessary to please his superiors and always ensures that his actions earn him some publicity.^{ep. 28} As the series progresses, Archer develops an interest in the military's various projects, such as the homunculi, chimeras, and the Philosopher's Stone. Archer loses the left half of his body when the Philosopher's Stone is created in Liore and receives automail modification in order to regain his mobility. After the operations left him mentally unstable, Archer rages through Central, carrying out King Bradley's ordered executions. Riza Hawkeye shoots Archer down while he tries to kill Roy Mustang.^{ep. 51} He is voiced by Shō Hayami in the Japanese series,^{ep. 28} and by Troy Baker in the English dub.^{ep. 28}

=== Isaac McDougal ===
Isaac McDougal (Isaac The Freezer) is a character exclusive to Fullmetal Alchemist: Brotherhood, better known as the Ice Alchemist. He is a former member of the Amestrian State Military until he deserted the army after the Ishval Civil War. He has been working with the anti-establishment ever since, planning to use a Philosopher's Stone to destroy central command and King Bradley, whom he believes to be a war criminal. However, his plans are thwarted when the Elric brothers, Alex Louis Armstrong, and Roy Mustang manage to defeat him. He manages to escape, but King Bradley intercepts him. McDougal gleefully tries to kill him using ice weapons made from his own blood, only to be immediately killed before he could land a hit. After his death, Edward eventually realizes that McDougal, like Hughes, was aware of Father's plans to consume Amestris and briefly regrets not listening to him.

Isaac McDougal is voiced by Kōichi Yamadera in Japanese and Bryan Massey in English.

== Merchandise ==
Action figures, busts, and statues from the Fullmetal Alchemist manga and anime have been created by leading toy companies, primarily Medicom and Southern Island. Medicom has created high end deluxe vinyl figures of the characters from the anime. Other merchandise includes plushes, key-chains, straps and pins. Apparels from the characters include the State Alchemists watches, necklaces and earrings. Characters are also featured in a trading card game that was first published in 2005 by Joyride Entertainment. Video games from the series also feature the characters, although in most of them the Elric brothers are the only playable characters.

== Reception ==
Several publications for anime, manga, and other media have provided praise and criticism to the characters from the series. Though the initial volumes were felt to be formulaic, Melissa Harper from Anime News Network noted that the series and characters grow in complexity as it progresses. She praised Arakawa for making all the characters designs unique and distinguishable, despite many of them wearing the same basic uniforms. Additionally, she liked the comedy of the characters, remarking that "Ed's facial expressions are probably the humorous highlight of the series." Lori Lancaster from Mania Entertainment praised the designs from the anime as well as the facial expressions from the characters. He also added that their interactions are very entertaining, praising the way how Edward deals with his opponents and his friends, giving the anime a good balance between action and comedy. Hilary Goldstein from IGN noted that the characterization of the protagonist Edward balances between being a "typical clever kid" and "a stubborn kid", successfully allowing him to float between the series more comical moments and its underlying drama without seeming false.

Samuel Arbogast from T.H.E.M. Anime Reviews comments that the interaction between the Elric brothers as they travel is interesting, since humor is quite frequent rather than the constant grimness of many series. He also praises the fact that all the characters have distinct designs, even though some of them had the same uniforms. Anime Boredom praised the characters for having a good balance between action, comedy and deep moments and remarked the emotional core of the development of the two main characters. Maria Lin from Animefringe.com criticized the large number of sentimental scenes in the series, considering them "an abuse to make the viewers cry". She also mentioned that the characters had lack of development, such as Edward having the same beliefs during all the anime as he once again tried to revive people using alchemy. However, she noted the anime "has some of the freshest and most vibrant character designs since Naruto".
