= Megumi Takamoto =

Japanese voice actress

- 高本 めぐみ
- Born: October 3, 1985 (age 40); Chiba Prefecture, Japan
- Occupation: Voice actress
- Years active: 2006–present
- Agent: Sigma Seven
- Height: 152.4 cm (5 ft 0 in)

Megumi Takamoto (高本 めぐみ, Megumi Takamoto; born October 3, 1985) is a Japanese voice actress from Chiba Prefecture, Japan.

== Biography ==
Takamoto auditioned for roles since junior high school, becoming a voice actress without attending training schools or vocational schools. She thought she would go to a training school after graduating from college, but made her debut while at school instead. During school, she was in the Valley Club.

In 2005, she won the Grand Prix at the 1st Sigma Seven Public Audition, and in April of the following year, debuted as Momoko Ichihara, the main character in the anime Love Get Chu: Miracle Seiyū Hakusho. In the event "Negima! Maho Ryogakuen Middle School 3-A 1st semester opening ceremony" held on April 23, it was announced that she would play the role of Chao Lingshen in the anime Negima! Magister Negi Magi. She voiced Winry Rockbell in Fullmetal Alchemist: Brotherhood.

In 2020, Takamoto announced she has married a man outside of the industry. The wedding occurred in February 2021.

== Filmography ==
=== Anime series ===
2006

- Love Get Chu (Momoko Ichihara)
- Negima!? (Chao Lingshen)

2007

- Big Windup! (Tomoka Fukami)
- Fantastic Detective Labyrinth (Hinako Mizuse)

2008

- Nogizaka Haruka no Himitsu (Maria Yukinohara)
- Jigoku Shoujo Mitsugane (Yuna Serizawa)

2009

- Fullmetal Alchemist: Brotherhood (Winry Rockbell)
- Sasameki Koto (Ushio Kazama)
- Sora no Manimani (Akina Kawamura)
- White Album (Misaki Sawakura)

2010

- Big Windup! ~Natsu no Taikai-hen~ (Tomoka Fukami)
- Hetalia: Axis Powers (Seychelles)
- Jewelpet Twinkle☆ (Alma Jinnai)

2011

- B-Daman Crossfire (Natsumi Inaba)
- A Dark Rabbit Has Seven Lives (Himea Saito)
- Deadman Wonderland (Mimi)
- Sket Dance (Mimori Unyū)

2012

- Jewelpet Kira☆Deco! (Saury)
- Oniichan dakedo Ai sae Areba Kankeinai yo ne! (Kaoruko Jinno)
- Saki Achiga-hen episode of Side-A (Hina Yamatani, Keiko Yagihara, Yoshiko Yasakouchi)

2013

- Cross Fight B-Daman eS (Natsumi Inaba)
- Unbreakable Machine-Doll (Charlotte Belew)

2014

- Dragon Collection (Ice Valkyrie)
- Jinsei (Tomoko Uchimura)
- Rokujyoma no Shinryakusha!? (Harumi Sakuraba)
- Saki: The Nationals (Hina Yamatani)

2015

- Cardfight!! Vanguard G (Hinako Miyamae)

2016

- And you thought there is never a girl online? (Ako's mother)

2017

- Konohana Kitan (Hiyori)

2021

- Hetalia: World Stars (Seychelles)

2025

- Summer Pockets (Kyoko Misaki)

=== Original video animation ===
- A Dark Rabbit Has Seven Lives (Himea Saito)
- Fullmetal Alchemist: Brotherhood (Winry Rockbell)
- Magi: Adventure of Sinbad (Sinbad (young))
- Negima! Magister Negi Magi (Chao Lingshen)
- Otome wa Boku ni Koishiteru: Futari no Elder (Kayleigh Glanzelius)

=== Anime films ===
- Fullmetal Alchemist: The Sacred Star of Milos (Winry Rockbell)
- Negima! Anime Final (Chao Lingshen)

=== Video games ===
- Fullmetal Alchemist Mobile (Winry Rockbell)
- Rosario + Vampire Capu2: The Rhapsody of Love and Dreams (Ran Otonashi, Rin Otonashi, Ren Otonashi)
