= Roy Mustang =

Fictional character from Fullmetal Alchemist

- Fullmetal Alchemist character
- Roy Mustang by Hiromu Arakawa
- First appearance: Fullmetal Alchemist chapter 4, "Battle on the Train" (2001)
- Created by: Hiromu Arakawa
- Portrayed by: Dean Fujioka
- Voiced by: Japanese: Tōru Ōkawa (2003 anime); Shin-ichiro Miki (Brotherhood); English: Travis Willingham

In-universe information
- Title: Flame Alchemist

Roy Mustang (Japanese: ロイ・マスタング, Hepburn: Roi Masutangu) is a fictional character from the Fullmetal Alchemist manga series and its adaptations created by Hiromu Arakawa. In the series, Mustang is a State Alchemist of Amestris' State Military, as well as the superior of the series' protagonist, Edward Elric. Mustang holds the title of "Flame Alchemist" (焔の錬金術師, Honō no Renkinjutsushi) for his ability to create fire with alchemy, and he ambitiously strives to become the next leader of Amestris. Despite his ambition, as the series continues, Mustang decides to overthrow the State Military after his best friend, Maes Hughes, is killed by the homunculi, who are controlling the Military. Besides his appearances in the manga and the anime, Mustang has also been featured in other media for the series, such as Makoto Inoue's light novels, the original video animations and the Fullmetal Alchemist video games.

Arakawa created Mustang as an apparent useless fighters whose importance in the series would surprise the reader, showing a major contrast with antagonist King Bradley in regards to who is a better leader. He has been voiced by Tōru Ōkawa and Shin-ichiro Miki in Japanese while Travis Willingham was in charge of the English dubs. Dean Fujioka portrayed him in the live-action films.

Since his introduction in the manga series, Mustang has been well received by readers, appearing second in each popularity poll for the series. His character has also received praise in various outside media, with many of them focusing on his ambitious characterization for higher power changes embodies revenge towards the ones who control the military as well as seek to protect society.

== Appearances ==
=== In Fullmetal Alchemist ===
Roy Mustang is introduced in Fullmetal Alchemist as a 29-year-old State Alchemist working for Amestris' State Military and as Edward Elric's superior. Outwardly arrogant and playfully manipulative, Mustang is intelligent and adaptable. At the beginning of the series, he appears as a ruthless careerist and a womanizer. He is also eventually shown to be a rather paternal commander who greatly cares for the emotional and physical well-being of his men, which earns him the fierce loyalty of his subordinates. This paternal nature stems from his experience in the Ishbal Civil War, where he was forced to kill using his flame alchemy, despite having learned it to help people. Angered with how he was used in the war, Mustang resolved to become the country's next leader. An extremely powerful alchemist in his own right, Mustang wears gloves made from "ignition cloth" with transmutation circles that create sparks or flames when he rubs his fingers together. By adjusting the oxygen densities in the surrounding atmosphere through alchemy, he can create flames anywhere in the surrounding area at will and manipulate them as he desires with "pinpoint accuracy". While it is often commented that Mustang is unable to produce fire with his gloves wet, he can as long as he has some way to call up flame.

Following the death of his best friend, Lieutenant Colonel Maes Hughes, Mustang investigates the incident in secret despite the military closing the case after convicting Maria Ross. Trusting in Ross's innocence, Mustang fakes Ross's death and engineers her escape from Amestris. While breaking into a military laboratory, Mustang kills Lust, an immortal creature known as a homunculus, who was investigating his actions and was going to kill subordinates. Recovering from his wounds, Mustang learns that the Führer King Bradley is also a homunculus and tries to expose him to the top echelons of the military. This move costs Mustang and deprives him of his subordinates – Bradley places Hawkeye, Mustang's adjutant, under his command and authorizes the transfer of Mustang's remaining personnel to the far reaches of Amestris.

Mustang is later contacted by General Olivier Armstrong, who is intending to join forces with various troops to attack Central City, the capital of Amestris. He then meets up with his subordinates, and the four attack Central's military while Bradley is gone. Mustang later confronts the homunculus Envy after learning that he was Hughes' true murderer; fueled by rage, Mustang easily defeats Envy. As Mustang prepares to finish Envy off, he is convinced by Hawkeye, Edward, and Scar not to kill him and allow his own thirst for vengeance to consume him. Later, the homunculi attack Mustang, forcing him to use human transmutation to become the fifth human sacrifice needed for their leader. This results in Mustang losing his eyesight as part of the sacrifice, although he continues to fight with Hawkeye to help him direct his attacks. However, after the final fight is over, a former comrade, Tim Marcoh, offers to use a Philosopher's Stone to restore Mustang's eyesight on the condition that he promises that he will be a part of a movement to restore Ishbal. Mustang accepts and is put in charge of the East region as brigadier general.

=== In the first anime ===
Mustang's characterization and role in the first anime is similar to that of the manga until after Hughes' death, while his backstory is mostly altered from that of the manga. Prior to the show's start, the viewpoints of Ishbal's religion and distaste of alchemy lead to the friction between them, which escalated into a war when a military officer shot an Ishbalan child. After seven years of fighting, the state alchemists including Mustang were called in to end the war, during which, Mustang executed Winry Rockbell's parents who were doctors on orders by the military due to them helping anyone whether they were on their side or not, even Ishbalans dying in the war. This act ultimately caused Mustang great depression to the point he almost committed human transmutation until Hughes snapped him out of it and gave him newfound resolve to become the Führer of Amestris so he would never have to follow such unreasonable orders like that ever again.

In the present, after Hughes' death, Mustang investigates his murder, but suddenly suspends it almost immediately after, much to the dismay of Sheska, who gives Mustang multiple books and information that Hughes was investigating before he was killed, but Mustang has difficulty understanding them. Later, while hunting down Scar, Mustang and his squadron resolve to keep the peace between the military and the Ishbalan refugees. The Elrics themselves are eventually sent to conduct an uprising in Liore after learning that Scar plans on creating the Philosopher's Stone within said city by luring the military as sacrifices. Mustang attempts to get Führer King Bradley to hold off to prevent the military from going into Liore and thus, give them time to arrest Scar for his crimes. Sadly, Mustang is unsuccessful because of Colonel Frank Archer's intervention as well as lust for glory, leading the soldiers to attack Liore and, thus, were eventually sacrificed, fully forging the Philosopher's Stone.

Forced by Bradley to pursue the Elrics after the Stone's creation, Mustang learns that Bradley is a homunculus and tries to expose him to the top brass of the military by revealing the truth about the Führer's secretary, Juliet Douglas. Mustang also finally comes to the true realization of all the corruption and institution plaguing the military which got Hughes killed in the first place: the homunculi were the real instigators behind the special ops troop that caused the war in Ishbal and thus, have given the military the opportunity to secretly create a Philosopher's Stone at the cost of numerous lives and erase all evidence after they steal the Stone each time. Edward and Mustang, despite their rocky relationship all this time around, finally repair it, coming to a greater understanding of each other before going their separate ways. Although Bradley intends for him to die in combat during the Northern Campaign, Mustang instead stays in Central, making his move to avenge Hughes. With Hawkeye's help and support, Mustang moves on to the Führer's mansion and stages his fight. Mustang is only able to successfully assassinate Bradley when his adoptive son, Selim, unwittingly brings the skull of the man from which the Führer was created and weakens Bradley. As Mustang escapes the Führer's mansion, he is confronted by a maniacal Archer, who shoots him unconscious, losing his left eye in the process. Hawkeye arrives in time to save Mustang's life and kills Archer. Afterwards, Mustang is forced to wear an eye patch while temporarily bedridden.

In Fullmetal Alchemist the Movie: Conqueror of Shamballa, Mustang resigns from both alchemy and his rank to become an ordinary enlisted man in a remote outpost. However, when Central is under attack by armies and airships from a parallel universe, Mustang steps up and takes command, using his alchemy to defend Central. Mustang and his comrade Alex Louis Armstrong are able to find a hot-air balloon to reach the airships, where he is reunited with the Elric brothers and helps them gain entry into the airship. Mustang and Alphonse are sad to watch Edward leave for good and destroy the gate on the parallel universe's side, knowing Edward will be trapped there permanently, but Mustang at the last second allows Alphonse to go so he can be with his brother. At the end of the movie, Al says that Mustang and his team are now responsible for destroying the Amestris side of the Gate.

=== In other media ===
Besides his appearances in the manga and the anime, Mustang also appears in most of the Fullmetal Alchemist original video animations, which are omake of the first anime and the film sequel. In the fourth light novel of the series written by Makoto Inoue, Fullmetal Alchemist: Under the Faraway Sky, Mustang, Hughes, and Armstrong find a village populated by children while they are on holidays. In the following title, Mustang appears investigating a case involving chimeras. In video games of the series, Mustang commonly appears as a supporting character in the Elric brothers' investigation of the Philosopher's Stone. He is also featured in several cards of the Fullmetal Alchemist Trading Card Game. Mustang's character is featured in the second volume of the character CDs series from Fullmetal Alchemist. The CD was published on December 15, 2004, under the name of Hagaren Song File – Roy Mustang. The tracks were composed by Kazuya Nishioka and performed by Toru Okawa, Mustang's Japanese voice actor in the first Fullmetal Alchemist anime. Additionally, Mustang is portrayed by Dean Fujioka in the live-action film based on the series.

== Creation and conception ==
Before Fullmetal Alchemist started publication, Arakawa had already thought that during the series, Mustang and his soldiers would fight against the antagonist Lust. She wanted that fight to be one of Mustang's most impressive scenes in the series, so she decided to give him calmer situations before writing such a scene. Having had only one important scene before his fight against Lust made readers of the series criticize Mustang's appearances; in order to change the readers' opinions about him before the outcome, Arakawa set up the sub-plot of how Maria Ross was accused of killing Maes Hughes and Mustang would intervene there. When King Bradley was revealed to be an antagonist, Arakawa wanted to differentiate the two characters via their treatment of their subordinates, with Mustang being unwilling to sacrifice them, unlike Bradley. Arakawa had trouble depicting this, feeling it was an important part of the series, and was unsure whether the result was good.

When the first guidebook of the series was released, Arakawa was surprised by the large number of images featuring Mustang and supposed he was a character "that's easy to mess with." Regarding Mustang's popularity within fans, Arakawa stated that while some consider him good-looking, it is still above average and that he was not too tall. While checking sketches she made before the series, Arakawa commented that most featuring Mustang are comical, with few of them showing him with a serious expression. Due to the character's flaws and past, Arakawa did not want to give Mustang a happy ending and when the series ends, the final page of the manga shows the major cast with the protagonist Edward smiling with his new family in a picture while Mustang does not emote in his picture. According to Arakawa, this was intentional.

In the first Fullmetal Alchemist anime series, Mustang was voiced by Toru Okawa, while in the second anime, Okawa was replaced by Shin-ichiro Miki. In the English dub of the first and second anime, Mustang was voiced by Travis Willingham. Willingham first auditioned for the part of Mustang after Justin Cook said he would be just right for the role. He also auditioned for Armstrong, which was cast to Christopher Sabat. Willingham also stated that during production, he and Vic Mignogna re-recorded several parts as he was not satisfied with the result.

== Reception ==
=== Popularity ===
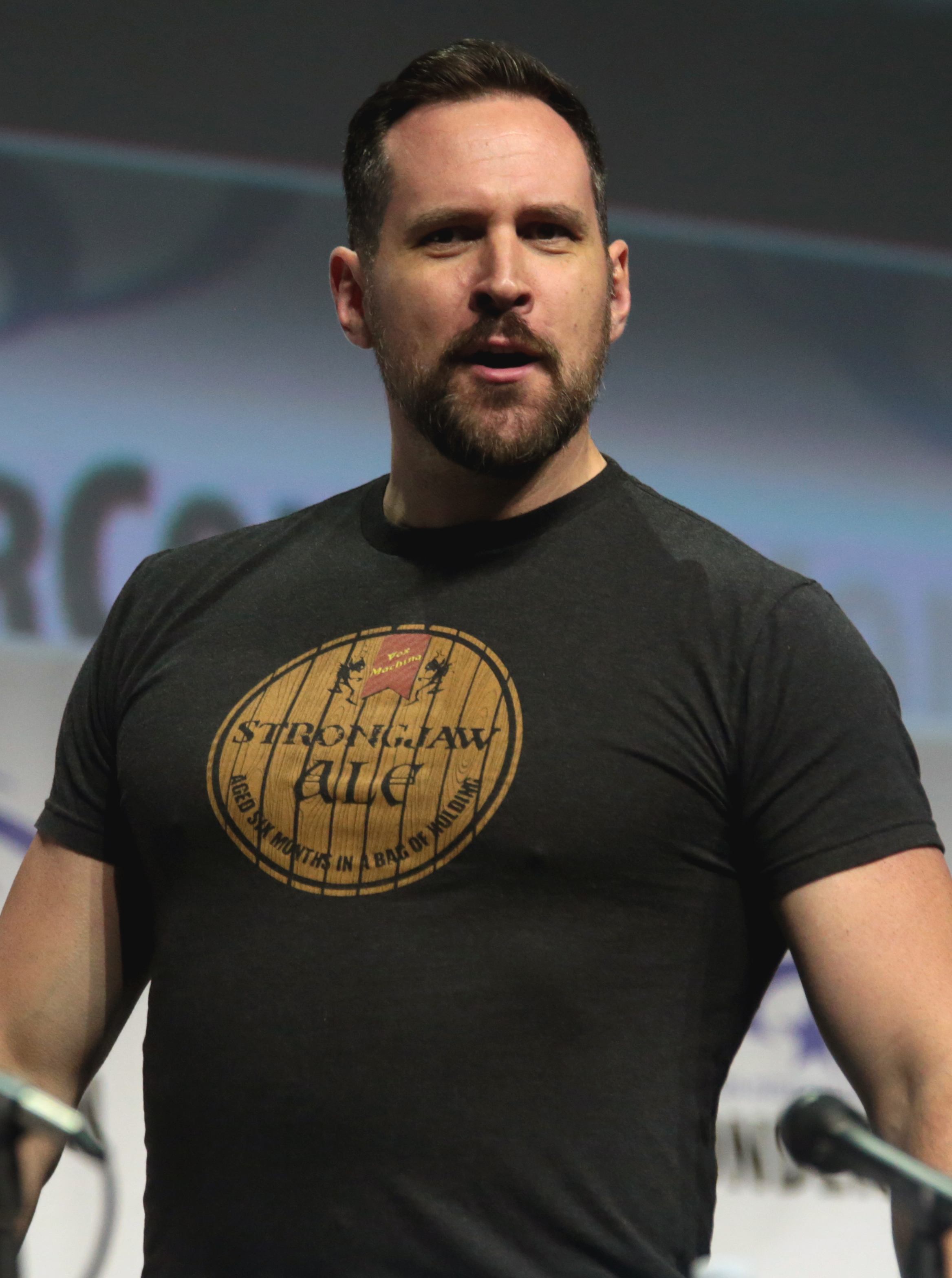
Travis Willingham, who provided the English voice of Mustang, received praise and the character was noted to have launched his voice acting career.

During January from 2007, Oricon made a poll in which they asked Japanese fans which characters from any series they would most like to see in spin-off series. In the survey "Men's choices", Mustang ranked sixth. In the July 2009 issue of Newtype, Mustang ranked sixth in the survey best anime male characters. In the August 2009 issue his rank changed to #8. In another Newtype poll from March 2010, Mustang was voted as the eleventh most popular male anime character from the 2000s. He has ranked highly in the Animage's Anime Grand Prix polls in the category of best male characters. His character has ranked second in all of the popularity polls from series developed by Monthly Shōnen Gangan, each time being surpassed by Edward Elric. Merchandising based on Mustang's likeness has also been released, including figurines, keychains and gloves for cosplaying. Shin-ichiro Miki, Mustang's Japanese voice actor in Fullmetal Alchemist: Brotherhood, was the winner of the fourth Seiyu Awards in the category "Best Supporting Actor Awards" for his role as Mustang, as well as Mobile Suit Gundam 00's Lockon Stratos. NTT customers voted him as their eleventh favorite black-haired male anime character. In a poll by Anime News Network, he was voted as the 3rd best "guy".

=== Critical response ===
Publications of manga, anime, and other media have commented on Mustang's character in both the manga and anime. While reviewing the first volume of the manga, Manga Life found that Mustang's character was more mature in the manga than in the anime. On the other hand, in the review from the first anime's last episodes, Lori Lancaster from Mania Entertainment enjoyed Mustang's relationship with Edward, comparing him to a "teasing and protective older brother". Sakura Eries from the same site noted that Mustang "steals the show" in Volume 10 of the manga, praising his fighting skills during his battle against Lust and Gluttony. Additionally, when Maria Ross was revealed in the same volume to be alive and that she was not killed by Mustang, Eries remarked on his work as leader, taking back her negative comments regarding Mustang when she thought that Mustang really killed her. These sub-plots were also commented by IGN's D. F. Smith, as they expanded Mustang's character much more than in the first anime series, where he had relatively smaller appearances. Lydia Hojnacki from PopCultureShock noted Mustang's character as one of the reasons she likes the series, noting his personality and relation with the Elric brothers. Jason Thompson regarded Mustang's fight with as one of the best battles from the shonen manga demography. Both Mustang's fight with and Envy were also recognized as playing with gender norms as result of how much tortures the female Lust in his wrath as well as the androgynous Envy regardless of gender.

David Smith from the same site cited his role and ambitions in the first anime series in the feature "Ten Things I Learned From Fullmetal Alchemist", which had comments on his flaws. When he watched Fullmetal Alchemist the Movie: Conqueror of Shamballa, Anime News Network writer Theron Martin mentioned that when Mustang "makes his dramatic return in a cheer-out-loud moment", he remarked the audience "went wild at that point". In IGN's review of the same film, Jeremy Mullin commented that he wanted to see Mustang's counterpart from Germany, as several characters from the series had their counterparts, but then said "it does make it fun imagining what" he would be.

=== Analysis ===
Piotr Konieczny in The Encyclopedia of Science Fiction said both Mustang and Edward reject metaphysical consolation", and instead claim that humans must confrot suffering and injustice while obtaining resposibiltyh, knowledge and action. In an article focused on Brotherhood, Mustang is seen as one of the most solid characters in the narrative due to his desire to punish war veterans who participated in the Ishval Civl War once he gains power, himself included while bringing comparisons to real world soldiers such as Nazi.

In the book "Anime Parables: 366 Daily Devotions", Roy Mustang is described as seeks power and ambition as well as revenge. He embodies the consequence of a "broken world". Mustang's characterization was compared to verse 2 Corinthians 5:17 as the character and people seek a greater purpose transformed by God. Mustang's character arc allows him to reflect Christ's love and sacrifice. He embodies leadership and devotes towards others, becoming a force for a greater good rather than for personal good. As a result, Mustang's arc allows the audience to remember faith in Christ and start a new life as well as change the lives of others.

SlashFilm noted while Mustang acts like a guide towards the Elric brothers, Scar, Hawkeye and him have bigger stories due to the sins they have committed with the focus on the Ishbalian Civil War where Mustang killed multiple fighters. Mustang's arc involves his redemption by helping others like how the final chapter hints his meetings with Xing and Ishbalians. However, while Edward reached the ending of his character arc, Mustang and Hawkeye are still lacking as noted through their lack of smiles in their final picture. In retrospect, Slash Film believes Mustang and Scar's arcs complement each other in regards tto whether or not their idealism can come across as naive.

In "Social Communication Hiromu Arakawa's Fullmetal Alchemist: Stylistic Nuances of the Comic Book" I. Lenczowska refers to Mustang as a parallel to the Elrics due to how both refer to a close individual whom they know for a long time; In Mustang's case it is Hawkeye as they met before the Ishvalan Civil War which heavily affected their personalities.
