= List of Fullmetal Alchemist: Brotherhood episodes =

Key visual for the series, featuring the alchemist brothers Edward (below) and Alphonse Elric (above)

Fullmetal Alchemist: Brotherhood (鋼の錬金術師 FULLMETAL ALCHEMIST, Hagane no Renkinjutsushi (Note: In Japan, the "Fullmetal Alchemist" English subtitle is added behind the original Japanese title to avoid confusion with the 2003 TV series and is generally not spoken aloud among native Japanese speakers. The subtitle can also be abbreviated down to "FA".)) is the second independent anime television series adaptation produced by Bones and Aniplex based on the manga series Fullmetal Alchemist by Hiromu Arakawa. Yasuhiro Irie served as series director, while Hiroshi Ōnogi served as the screenwriter. The series follows the story of two alchemist brothers, Edward and Alphonse Elric, who want to restore their bodies after a disastrous failed attempt to revive their mother through alchemy. Unlike the original 2003 anime adaptation, which diverged into a story exclusive to that series near the beginning of its run, the second series directly follows the entire story from the original manga. Fullmetal Alchemist: Brotherhood comprises a total of 64 episodes, 4 original video animations (OVAs), and a theatrical spin-off film.

The anime series premiered on April 5, 2009, on MBS and TBS's Sunday 5:30 p.m. JST anime timeblock, replacing Mobile Suit Gundam 00. It received its English language premiere five days later on Animax Asia, with Japanese audio and English subtitles. Anime licensing distributor Funimation (now Crunchyroll LLC) streamed English subtitled episodes four days after the Japanese air dates on both its website and its YouTube channel. Funimation suspended streaming of the series for a few weeks in May following the accidental leak of an episode of One Piece from its servers before it had aired in Japan. Every episode was also made available on American subscription service Hulu, showing 14 days after their original airing, as well as via Australia's Madman Entertainment. English dubbed episodes of the series started premiering on American cable network Adult Swim from February 14, 2010, onwards, at 12:00 a.m. ET as part of its Saturday night action block.

Aniplex began releasing the series in DVD and Blu-ray on August 26, 2009. The first one contains two episodes and an original video animation (OVA). Three more OVAs were included in the fifth, ninth and thirteenth volumes alongside four episodes. Other volumes feature four episodes and no OVAs. A total of sixteen volumes were released, with the last one on November 24, 2010. Funimation began releasing the episodes on Blu-ray and DVD in five volumes, each of thirteen episodes on May 25, 2010.

Brotherhood's music was composed by Akira Senju. Ten pieces of theme music were used in Brotherhood. The respective opening and ending themes for the first 14 episodes are "Again" by Yui, and "Uso" (嘘; lit. 'Lie') by Sid. From episode 15–26, the respective opening and ending themes are "Hologram" by Nico Touches the Walls, and "Let It Out" by Miho Fukuhara. From episode 27–38, the respective opening and ending themes are "Golden Time Lover" by Sukima Switch, and "Tsunaida Te" (つないだ手; lit. 'Tied Hands') by Lil'B. From episode 39–50, the respective opening and ending themes are "Period" by Chemistry, and "Shunkan Sentimental" (瞬間センチメンタル, Shunkan Senchimentaru; lit. 'Sentimental Moment') by Scandal. From episodes 51–62, the respective opening and ending themes are "Rain" (レイン, Rein) by Sid, and "Ray of Light" by Shoko Nakagawa. While episodes 63 and 64 do not use any opening themes, they use "Rain" and "Hologram", respectively, for the endings.

== Episodes ==
No.	Title	Directed by (Note: Production staff information is taken from the ending credits of each episode.)	Written by	Animation directed by	Original release date	English air date
1	"Fullmetal Alchemist"; Transliteration: "Hagane no Renkinjutsushi" (Japanese: 鋼の錬金術師)	Directed by : Takahiro Ikezoe; Storyboarded by : Yasuhiro Irie	Hiroshi Ōnogi	Tomokatsu Nagasaku	April 5, 2009	February 14, 2010
The Elric brothers, Edward and Alphonse, have already made a strong reputation for themselves despite Edward's short military career. They are called upon by the Führer King Bradley and Colonel Roy Mustang to hunt down the "Freezing Alchemist", the rogue state alchemist Isaac McDougal. Edward and Alphonse ambush and successfully capture McDougal. However, Edward becomes enraged by McDougal calling him "small" and McDougal finds an opening and escapes. The Elric brothers and the state military are forced to confront McDougal again when he simultaneously activates numerous transmutation circles in Central. This creates an alchemic reaction encompassing the entire command center. Edward suspects the use of a philosopher's stone, but is unable to confirm his suspicion. Luckily, the Elric brothers, Major Alex Louis Armstrong, and Mustang succeed in thwarting McDougal's plans to bury Central in ice. The Führer confronts McDougal as he attempts to escape. In the brief battle that follows, McDougal is easily sliced to death by the Führer, who later credits Mustang and the Elric brothers with helping to accomplish the mission.
2	"The First Day"; Transliteration: "Hajimari no Hi" (Japanese: はじまりの日)	Directed by : Kazuo Miyake; Storyboarded by : Yasuhiro Irie	Hiroshi Ōnogi	Madoka Ozawa	April 12, 2009	February 21, 2010
As Edward and Alphonse depart for Liore by train, their childhood is shown in flashback where they learned rudimentary alchemy from their father's books. Upon their mother's death, they attempted to revive her by performing human transmutation, a practice officially considered taboo among alchemists. A dark mass of shadowy hands proceeded to disintegrate Alphonse's physical body, while a disembodied figure named Truth showed Edward the secret behind perfect human transmutation in exchange for his left leg. To prevent the loss of his brother, Edward sacrifices his right arm to bond Alphonse's soul within a suit of armor. Back in the present day, Colonel Maes Hughes shows Mustang the paperwork concerning the McDougal incident, which states that McDougal used a little-known Xingese art known as alkahestry. Back in the past, Edward's skill in surviving the attempted human transmutation and anchoring his brother's soul attracted the attention of Mustang, who suggested that Edward become a state alchemist. Edward later passes the state alchemist examination and is given the title of "Fullmetal Alchemist".
3	"City of Heresy"; Transliteration: "Jakyō no Machi" (Japanese: 邪教の街)	Masao Ōkubo	Hiroshi Ōnogi	Yasuyuki Noda	April 19, 2009	February 28, 2010
Edward and Alphonse arrive at Liore, where they witness Father Cornello gaining the devotion of the townspeople by performing "miraculous" transmutations, which they believe could only have been accomplished using a philosopher's stone. They meet Rosé and request to see Cornello. When Cornello realizes that Edward and Alphonse are alchemists, he ambushes them with a chimera. During the battle, Edward unintentionally reveals his prosthetic automail limbs, and Cornello realizes that he had attempted the taboo of human transmutation. Edward and Alphonse escape with Rosé. While Alphonse explains their story to Rosé, Cornello finds Edward and reveals his nefarious plan, unaware that it had been broadcast to the whole town of Liore through a microphone. Cornello attacks Edward using the philosopher's stone on his ring, but Edward manages to expose him. Edward realizes that the stone is a fake when it falls and shatters on the ground. Cornello runs off, but is killed by Lust and eaten by Gluttony. Later, Rosé demands the stone from Edward, but he confronts her with the truth about the fake stone and Cornello and he tells her to find strength within herself.
4	"An Alchemist's Anguish"; Transliteration: "Renkinjutsushi no Kunō" (Japanese: 錬金術師の苦悩)	Directed by : Kiyomitsu Satō; Storyboarded by : Hitoshi Nanba (Note: Credited under the pen name Namimi Sanjo)	Michihiro Tsuchiya	Hiroya Iijima	April 26, 2009	March 7, 2010
A mysterious man with a cross-shaped scar across his face attacks and kills Brigadier General Basque Grand. The Führer orders Hughes and Armstrong to use all available resources to stop the murderer. Meanwhile, to avoid being in their debt, Mustang introduces Edward and Alphonse to state alchemist Shou Tucker, the "Sewing-Life Alchemist", who obtained his credentials by creating a chimera which could understand human speech. He opens up his library to the Elric brothers to study living creature transmutation, but they also spend time playing with Tucker's daughter Nina and the family dog Alexander. On returning to the house for another study session, they find that Tucker has created another speaking chimera in order to satisfy his yearly assessment requirements. However, the horrified Edward discovers that Tucker created the chimera by combining Nina and Alexander, and using his wife two years earlier. Alphonse stops Edward from nearly beating Tucker to death. Mustang tells him that by being a state alchemist, he must prepare himself to take a life if called upon by the military. Tucker gets arrested for the evidence, but he and the chimera are killed by the scarred man.
5	"Rain of Sorrows"; Transliteration: "Kanashimi no Ame" (Japanese: 哀しみの雨)	Directed by : Hiroshi Ikehata; Storyboarded by : Yasuhiro Irie	Michihiro Tsuchiya	Chiyomi Tsukamoto	May 3, 2009	March 14, 2010
Lieutenant Riza Hawkeye tells Edward and Alphonse about the deaths of Tucker and the chimera. Meanwhile, back in Liore, Lust and Gluttony attempt to cause a rebellion using the faith of the locals, with Envy disguised as Cornello. Back at East City, as Edward and Alphonse dwell on their limits in alchemy, they are viciously attacked by Scar. They quickly retreat until they are cornered and are forced to defend themselves, resulting in Scar damaging Alphonse's body and destroying Edward's right arm. The state alchemists intervene just when Scar prepares to finish off Edward. Mustang, unable to subdue Scar, is saved by Hawkeye, who reminds Mustang that his flame alchemy is useless in the rain. When Armstrong arrives and battles Scar, it is revealed that the man is an Ishvalan. Outnumbered, Scar manages to escape into the sewers, and Mustang tells the Elric brothers about the Ishval civil war. Edward and Alphonse decide to return to Resembool and repair their bodies.
6	"Road of Hope"; Transliteration: "Kibō no Michi" (Japanese: 希望の道)	Directed by : Tsutomu Yabuki; Storyboarded by : Kōtarō Tamura	Shōtarō Suga	Ryousuke Sekiguchi	May 10, 2009	March 21, 2010
While Armstrong escorts Edward and Alphonse back to Resembool by train, he spots a man named Tim Marcoh, the "Crystal Alchemist", at a nearby stop. He explains that Marcoh was a state alchemist and doctor during the Ishval civil war, and conducted research on biological alchemy before disappearing at the end of the war. They talk to Marcoh and learn that he was researching the philosopher's stone, but only succeeded in creating an incomplete version. At first refusing to share his knowledge with Edward, Marcoh eventually provides a clue to the location of his research data. After they reach Resembool, Winry Rockbell and her grandmother Pinako start working on Edward's automail. After receiving his replacement arm and leg, Edward uses his alchemy to rebuild Alphonse's suit of armor from the shattered remains. Afterwards, the Elric brothers, along with Armstrong, head back to Central to look for Marcoh's research.
7	"Hidden Truths"; Transliteration: "Kakusareta Shinjitsu" (Japanese: 隠された真実)	Directed by : Masahiro Sonoda; Storyboarded by : Masayuki Sakoi	Hiroshi Ōnogi	Masahiro Ando	May 17, 2009	March 28, 2010
Edward and Alphonse return to Central, only to find that the first branch of the state library, where Marcoh's research was stored, has been burned down. Scar encounters and battles Lust and Gluttony in the sewers, resulting in a large explosion. Edward and Alphonse's new escorts, Denny Brosh and Maria Ross, direct them to Sheska, a file clerk who had worked at the first branch of the state library, but was fired for spending her time reading. Sheska reveals that she has an eidetic memory, memorized all of Marcoh's research. She makes handwritten duplicates for the Elric brothers. While initially appearing to be a cookbook, Edward notices that it is written in a code that Marcoh created. Edward and Alphonse spend several days deciphering the hidden data, and discover that the philosopher's stone is made by sacrificing living humans. Edward asks Brosh and Ross to keep it a secret, but Armstrong learns about it using intimidation. Edward notices another hidden piece of information, locating an unused laboratory next to a prison, where "raw materials" for the stone were gathered. Armstrong tells the Elric brothers to stay put, but they both manage to sneak out to the fifth laboratory. Edward enters the building via an air duct, while Alphonse waits outside, unaware that he is being watched by a menacing figure.
8	"The Fifth Laboratory"; Transliteration: "Daigo Kenkyūsho" (Japanese: 第五研究所)	Directed by : Tōru Ishida; Storyboarded by : Yasuhiro Irie	Hiroshi Ōnogi	Masaru Oshiro	May 24, 2009	April 4, 2010
At the fifth laboratory, Alphonse fights Barry the Chopper outside, and Edward faces Slicer inside. It is revealed that both opponents are souls of killers affixed to armor. Edward struggles in his battle when his automail arm malfunctions. Alphonse initially has the advantage in his fight, until Barry suggests that Alphonse never truly existed, claiming he was a doll made by Edward with false memories, causing Alphonse to contemplate the possibility. Edward is particularly troubled when his opponent turns out to be a pair of brothers, each controlling a different part of the armor. Edward manages to defeat Slicer by use of Scar's destruction technique, but before he can extract any information from the two brothers, they are killed by Lust and Envy. Edward demands to know who they are and tries to use alchemy, but his automail arm breaks and he is knocked out by Envy. Outside, Barry almost gains the upper hand over Alphonse, but Alphonse is saved by the arrival of Brosh and Ross. Lust and Envy destroy the lab to cover up the evidence of the philosopher's stone, but not before carrying Edward outside and handing him over to Brosh and Ross, commenting that he is a valuable resource.
9	"Created Feelings"; Transliteration: "Tsukurareta Omoi" (Japanese: 創られた想い)	Masao Ōkubo	Hiroshi Ōnogi	Yasuyuki Noda	May 31, 2009	April 11, 2010
Edward is hospitalized following the incident at the fifth laboratory. Needing his automail repaired, Edward calls for Winry to come to Central. Winry arrives and repairs Edward's arm, adding the small bolt she forgot to insert back in Resembool. Alphonse still contemplates what Barry had told him about being a doll created by Edward. Hughes invites Winry over to his daughter Elicia's birthday party, where she laments that Edward and Alphonse never tell her anything. Hughes tells her that men tend to hide things to avoid worrying anyone. Alphonse confronts Edward about whether he is really an artificial soul. Edward storms off and Winry yells at Alphonse, telling him that Edward was terrified Alphonse may have blamed him for getting him stuck in the armor. The Elric brothers fight, with Edward emerging as the victor. They both reminisce about their past fights, reaffirming their existence. Meanwhile, Scar wakes up in the care of Ishvalan refugees.
10	"Separate Destinations"; Transliteration: "Sorezore no Yukusaki" (Japanese: それぞれの行く先)	Directed by : Kazuo Miyake; Storyboarded by : Katsumi Terahigashi	Michihiro Tsuchiya	Satoshi Ishino	June 7, 2009	April 18, 2010
Führer King Bradley appears at the hospital and warns the Elric brothers to be careful around the military, and he leaves through a window to evade his subordinates. Edward and Alphonse decide to go to the town of Dublith to visit their alchemy teacher, Izumi Curtis, to ask her for information about the philosopher's stone. They agree to take Winry with them when she notices that Rush Valley, a town known for creating the best automail in the world, is on the way to Dublith. Meanwhile, Hughes links the problems in Liore, the fifth laboratory, and the Ishval civil war. He discovers a connection, but is ambushed by Lust. When Hughes calls Mustang on a public telephone booth, he is ambushed and killed by Envy, disguised firstly as Ross, and then as his wife Gracia. Hughes is posthumously promoted to the rank of brigadier general while his murder is investigated by Mustang, who concludes via Armstrong that a high ranked member of the military may be responsible for ordering Hughes' death.
11	"Miracle at Rush Valley"; Transliteration: "Rasshu Barē no Kiseki" (Japanese: ラッシュバレーの奇跡)	Directed by : Kiyomitsu Satō; Storyboarded by : Shinji Ishihira	Shōtarō Suga	Hiroya Iijima & Nichi Gogatsu	June 14, 2009	April 25, 2010
Edward, Alphonse, and Winry arrive in Rush Valley, where Edward's state alchemist pocket watch is stolen by a pickpocket named Paninya. After chasing her down, they find she has automail legs. Winry asks the automail's creator, Dominic LeCoulte, to let her be his apprentice, but her request is swiftly denied. Winry convinces Paninya to return the pocket watch for Edward, but first she peeks inside and sees the date when the Elric brothers burned down their house. Meanwhile, Dominic's daughter-in-law is having a baby, but she is unable to travel to a hospital in the poor weather. Winry and Paninya deliver the baby, resulting in a successful birth. Winry asks Dominic again to be an apprentice, and this time he directs her to another automail mechanical engineer. With that, Edward and Alphonse continue onward to Dublith.
12	"One is All, All is One"; Transliteration: "Ichi wa Zen, Zen wa Ichi" (Japanese: 一は全、全は一)	Directed by : Ikurō Satō; Storyboarded by : Shin Misawa	Hiroshi Ōnogi	Madoka Ozawa	June 21, 2009	May 2, 2010
Edward and Alphonse visit their master Izumi and her husband Sig seeking clues on the philosopher's stone. During their stay, the Elric brothers recall how they first met Izumi during a flooding in Resembool, and how they were formally accepted as Izumi's disciples after she stranded them on an island for a month as a test. They look back at how they figured out the meaning behind "one is all, all is one". Izumi realizes that the Elric brothers attempted human transmutation by their movements during hand-to-hand combat training. Realizing that they had attempted human transmutation, Izumi tells the Elrics that she had also broke the taboo and failed to revive her child after suffering miscarriage. The three make up, bonding over the hardships that they had suffered from their attempts at human transmutation.
13	"Beasts of Dublith"; Transliteration: "Daburisu no Kemono-tachi" (Japanese: ダブリスの獣たち)	Directed by : Keiko Oyamada; Storyboarded by : Michio Fukuda	Shōtarō Suga	Taichi Furumata	June 28, 2009	May 9, 2010
Edward and Alphonse are expelled by Izumi, now treating them as her equals rather than as students. Meanwhile, Mustang announces to his five subordinates that they are all transferring to Central. Elsewhere, Scar is recovering in an Ishvalan squatter colony and is advised by the elder that pursuing the current state alchemists would not benefit the surviving Ishvalans. Scar is then accosted by two thugs recruited by Yoki, who wants to take Scar back to Central over the murder of Basque Grand, but he defeats them and leaves the colony. In Dublith, Alphonse is lured to a trap and captured by Roa, Bido, Martel, and Dolcetto, chimera employed by the homunculus Greed. Edward finds Greed, who offers to teach him homunculus fabrication in exchange for information about human transmutation. Enraged, Edward charges at Greed who uses his ultimate shield to repel Edward's attacks. However, Edward makes a counterattack by transmuting Greed's ultimate shield. In the midst of the battle, Izumi arrives and intervenes, taking Greed by surprise.
14	"Those Who Lurk Underground"; Transliteration: "Chika ni Hisomu Mono-tachi" (Japanese: 地下にひそむ者たち)	Directed by : Hiroshi Ikehata; Storyboarded by : Shinji Ishihira	Hiroshi Ōnogi	Chiyomi Tsukamoto	July 5, 2009	May 16, 2010
Bradley and Armstrong lead a team of state military soldiers to raid Greed's hideout, although Bradley uses it as cover to hunt for Greed. Bradley goes into the sewage passageway beneath the hideout and duels with Greed. Surprised by the abilities of Bradley the Führer, Greed is severely weakened by Bradley who reveals his true identity as Wrath. Roa and Dolcetto attempt to save Greed, but are killed by the Führer. Martel, who is still inside Alphonse, attempts to choke Bradley to death with Alphonse's armor, but she is stabbed by Bradley. Her blood splashes on Alphonse's blood seal and unlocks his forgotten memories. Later, Alphonse reveals to Edward that he managed to recover his former memories, prior to their failed attempt at human transmutation to revive their mother. Greed is taken as a captive to Father, who was disappointed in him after he deserted the rest of the homunculi. When Greed refuses to rejoin the homunculi, he is melted alive to a liquid philosopher's stone, which is then consumed by Father.
15	"Envoy from the East"; Transliteration: "Tōhō no Shisha" (Japanese: 東方の使者)	Directed by : Rokō Ogiwara; Storyboarded by : Masao Ōkubo	Yoneki Tsumura	Yasuyuki Noda	July 12, 2009	May 23, 2010
Scar engages and defeats another state alchemist named Giolio Comanche, the "Silver Alchemist". Returning to his temporary hideout, Scar discovers Yoki with a young Xingese girl named May Chang accompanied by a tiny panda named Shao Mei. They traveled across the eastern desert searching for the philosopher's stone. Meanwhile, Barry the Chopper is detained and interrogated by Roy Mustang, Riza Hawkeye, and Vato Falman over the assassination of Captain Maes Hughes. In Rush Valley, the Elric brothers ask Winry to repair Edward's automail once again. They find a starving Xingese man named Ling Yao. After being fed, he explains his purpose for researching alkahestry. His bodyguards, Lan Fan and Fu, attempt to take Elric brothers hostage, in the hope of extracting the secrets of the philosopher's stone. The Elric brothers defeat the bodyguards, damaging much of the town in the process. However, the bodyguards escape, leaving the brothers to confront the angry townspeople. After repairing the town, Edward and Alphonse meet Ling again who explains that he wants to become the heir to the throne by offering the king some information about the philosopher's stone and immortality. Winry joins the group as they all prepare to depart for Central. Meanwhile, Scar and Yoki travel to Central at night with May in a horse-drawn wagon.
16	"Footsteps of a Comrade-in-Arms"; Transliteration: "Senyū no Ashiato" (Japanese: 戦友の足跡)	Tsutomu Yabuki	Shōtarō Suga	Ryousuke Sekiguchi	July 19, 2009	May 30, 2010
Edward, Alphonse, and Winry arrive in Central, where Ling is arrested for being an illegal immigrant. Sheska inadvertently reveals some information on Mustang to Envy, disguised as Captain Focker, one of her superiors. Mustang tells the Elric brothers that Hughes has retired from the state military. However, they soon learn the truth about his death after encountering Ross. When they visit Gracia and Elicia, Winry is already there, and the brothers apologize to Gracia, as Edward blames himself for Hughes' death. Gracia encourages them to push forward as she holds back her tears. Meanwhile, Envy comes up with a plan to stop Mustang from investigating the case. The next day, Ross is arrested by Colonel Henry Douglas for Hughes' murder.
17	"Cold Flame"; Transliteration: "Reitetsu na Honō" (Japanese: 冷徹な焰)	Directed by : Masahiro Sonoda; Storyboarded by : Shinji Ishihira	Hiroshi Ōnogi	Masahiro Ando	July 26, 2009	June 6, 2010
Ross, falsely accused of Hughes' assassination, is placed under military police custody and interrogated by Douglas. After reading a newspaper article about Ross's detention, Barry the Chopper leaves the safe house and launches a solo raid on the jail. Barry releases Ross from jail as well as Ling who promises to help them both. Barry tells Ross that she needs to leave Central immediately or risk being killed. Edward and Alphonse run into the trio, and Barry holds the brothers off to allow Ross time to escape. Ross runs into Mustang, who seemingly kills her in with a massive fireball. Edward accosts Mustang after seeing a charred body, but Mustang coldly reminds Edward of his place as a soldier of the state military. Later, Armstrong shows up and declares that Edward should return to Resembool to have his automail arm fixed, dragging the confused Edward away.
18	"The Arrogant Palm of a Small Human"; Transliteration: "Chisa na Ningen no Gōman na Tenohira" (Japanese: 小さな人間の傲慢な掌)	Directed by : Kazuhide Tomonaga & Keiko Oyamada; Storyboarded by : Minoru Ōhara	Michihiro Tsuchiya	Taichi Furumata	August 2, 2009	June 13, 2010
Edward and Armstrong arrive in Resembool where they meet Heymans Breda, who takes them to the Xerxes ruins. There, they discover that Ross is still alive, and that Mustang faked her death in order to draw out those responsible for Hughes' death. After the brief reunion, Ross decides to hide out in Xing with Fu, but promises to return if she is ever needed. After Ross' departure, Edward explores the ruins, finding a damaged transmutation circle. He also encounters a group of Ishvalan refugees, who reveal that it was Scar who killed Winry's parents while they gave medical aid to the Ishvalan during the civil war. Meanwhile, Barry's human body, which is now nothing more than a crazed animal, attacks Falman and Barry back in Central. However, with the assistance of Jean Havoc and the sniper Hawkeye, they manage to subdue Barry's body. However, Hawkeye is ambushed by Gluttony.
19	"Death of the Undying"; Transliteration: "Shinazaru Mono no Shi" (Japanese: 死なざる者の死)	Directed by : Shūji Miyahara; Storyboarded by : Shinji Ishihira	Hiroshi Ōnogi	Masaru Oshiro	August 9, 2009	June 20, 2010
Kain Fuery arrives in time to save Hawkeye and Mustang, forcing Gluttony to retreat. Alphonse meets up with the group and they pursue Barry, who chases his body into the depths of the third laboratory. The group splits into two teams. Mustang and Havoc are ambushed by Lust, resulting in both men being grievously wounded and left for dead. Lust confronts and kills Barry. Hawkeye, believing Mustang to be dead, desperately shoots Lust repeatedly with minimal effect. Before Lust can kill Hawkeye, Mustang appears, having cauterized his wounds, he repeatedly incinerates Lust until her philosopher's stone is depleted. No longer able to regenerate, she crumbles to ash. Barry's soul survives, but his blood seal is scratched out by his human body, which kills both of them. Edward returns to Resembool and heads toward the Rockbell residence, where he sees his father Van Hohenheim at the grave of his mother Trisha.
20	"Father Before the Grave"; Transliteration: "Bozen no Chichi" (Japanese: 墓前の父)	Directed by : Ikurō Satō; Storyboarded by : Katsumi Terahigashi	Yoneki Tsumura	Tetsuya Kawakami	August 16, 2009	June 27, 2010
After arguing with Hohenheim, Edward overhears the conversation between him and Pinako, and that the corpse that the Elric brothers had attempted to transmute may not have been their mother. Hohenheim leaves the next day, warning Pinako that something terrible will happen in Amestris. After helping Pinako dig up the corpse, Edward realizes it is not their mother. Edward calls Izumi, asking her to confirm that the child in her transmutation was definitely not hers. Edward returns to Central, and reunites with Alphonse and Winry, explaining the truth. Izumi calls Edward, to say the transmuted baby was not hers. Edward, Alphonse, and Izumi then feel a sense of relief that they had not killed their loved ones a second time. This confirms Edward's suspicions that it is impossible to revive the deceased people. However, Edward reassures the others that retrieving someone from beyond the gateway of Truth is still possible and the Elric brothers reaffirm their resolve to return Alphonse to his original body. In a flashback, it is revealed that Alphonse's soul has been shortly contained within a dying monster, before Edward revives his brother within a suit of armor at the cost of his arm.
21	"Advance of the Fool"; Transliteration: "Gusha no Zenshin" (Japanese: 愚者の前進)	Directed by : Kiyomitsu Satō; Storyboarded by : Michio Fukuda	Michihiro Tsuchiya	Hiroya Iijima	August 30, 2009	July 4, 2010
Edward ponders the proposition that Alphonse may be absorbing some nutrients through him. In hospital, Mustang suspects that the Führer is cooperating with the homunculi. Havoc reveals the lower half of his body is paralyzed, but Mustang says that he is still needed. Scar returns to Central and murders three more state alchemists, so Edward and Alphonse dangerously plan to confront him in order to draw out the homunculi. Ling and Lan Fan agree to help them, as it would benefit Ling in finding information about immortality. Mustang sends Breda to locate Marcoh, only to find he has been kidnapped. Edward begins showboating in the streets, eventually luring out Scar. While the Elric brothers fight him, Mustang reports false information regarding Scar's whereabouts, confusing and stalling the state military to prevent Scar being shot before the homunculi appear. Lan Fan confronts Gluttony, but is ambushed by Bradley.
22	"Backs in the Distance"; Transliteration: "Tōku no Senaka" (Japanese: 遠くの背中)	Directed by : Tsutomu Yabuki; Storyboarded by : Shinji Ishihira	Shōtarō Suga	Kenichi Ōnuki	September 6, 2009	July 11, 2010
Ling tries to escape with the wounded Lan Fan, but is attacked by Bradley and Gluttony. Meanwhile, Winry heads to where the Elric brothers are fighting Scar and she hears Edward questioning Scar about the death of her parents. Shocked by this, Winry picks up a nearby gun and aims it at Scar. It is then that Scar recounts back on his brother who had researched alchemy to combat the attacking state alchemists. However, they were attacked by Solf J. Kimblee, the "Crimson Alchemist" and Scar had his right arm brutally severed. To save him, his brother sacrificed himself and transferred his right arm onto Scar. Shocked upon waking up and seeing his brother's arm on his body, Scar went berserk and inadvertently killed Winry's parents whom he saw as enemies. Back in the present day, Edward intervenes between Winry and Scar, reminding Scar of when his brother protected him. While Alphonse follows Scar, Edward comforts the traumatized Winry and disarms the gun from her.
23	"Girl on the Battlefield"; Transliteration: "Ikusaba no Shōjo" (Japanese: 戦場(いくさば)の少女)	Directed by : Takayuki Tanaka; Storyboarded by : Shin Misawa	Michihiro Tsuchiya	Yūsuke Tanaka	September 13, 2009	July 18, 2010
Edward leaves Winry in custody for the state military, while Bradley chases Ling and Lan Fan, and Gluttony pursues Scar. Edward rejoins Alphonse in his fight against Scar, when Gluttony arrives on the scene. Ling joins the fight and captures Gluttony using binding steel cables. Lan Fan manages to escape Bradley, by severing her disabled arm and strapping it to a dog to throw him off her trail. Hawkeye arrives and drives off with Ling and Gluttony. The Elric brothers surround Scar, but they are stopped by May. She uses her alkahestry to escape with him. However, the Elric brothers catch her panda, Shao Mei. After the brothers explain everything to Winry she feels depressed and helpless, but her mood improves when she realizes that she is needed by her customers back in Rush Valley. As she leaves on the train for Rush Valley, Winry suspects that she may be falling in love with Edward. Meanwhile, Edward and Alphonse join the others at a hideout, where Lan Fan's wounds are treated by Doctor Knox. Ling reveals to Edward, Alphonse, and Mustang that Bradley the Führer is a homunculus. When Gluttony hears mention of Mustang, Lust's killer, he transforms and blows the corner off the hideout.
24	"Inside the Belly"; Transliteration: "Hara no Naka" (Japanese: 腹の中)	Directed by : Keiko Oyamada; Storyboarded by : Yūichirō Yano	Seishi Minakami	Taichi Furumata	September 20, 2009	July 25, 2010
Marcoh, in custody of the homunculi, has to cooperate in exchange for his village's safety. Meanwhile, Edward, Alphonse, and Ling try to escape from Gluttony, who has become able to swallow anything in his sight. After losing Gluttony, Dr. Knox takes Mustang, Hawkeye, and Lan Fan to safety while Edward, Alphonse, and Ling stay to fight. Envy arrives to stop Gluttony from harming the Elric brothers. Hearing this, Edward and Alphonse face Gluttony while Ling battles Envy. During the fight, Gluttony traps Edward, Ling, and Envy inside his body. Back in Central, Mustang stumbles upon a conspiracy between the Führer and the top brass of the state military.
25	"Doorway of Darkness"; Transliteration: "Yami no Tobira" (Japanese: 闇の扉)	Directed by : Hiroshi Ikehata; Storyboarded by : Yoshimitsu Ōhashi	Yoneki Tsumura	Hitomi Takechi & Chiyomi Tsukamoto	September 27, 2009	August 1, 2010
Edward and Ling find themselves in an endless dark cavern and assume they are inside Gluttony's stomach. May misses her companion Shao Mei, explaining how their circumstances brought them together, so Scar decides to help search for the panda. Edward and Ling find Envy who explains that there is no exit from the cavern and that Gluttony was a failed attempt by Father at recreating the Gate of Truth. Envy reveals that he was the one who started the Ishval civil war. Edward angrily attacks him, but Envy transforms into his real form, a giant beast. In Central, the Führer isolates Mustang by transferring his staff to various military command headquarters and assigning Hawkeye as his personal assistant, effectively making her his hostage. Meanwhile, Alphonse convinces Gluttony to take him to Father, who is apparently in Central.
26	"Reunion"; Transliteration: "Saikai" (Japanese: 再会)	Takahiro Ikezoe	Michihiro Tsuchiya	Tomokatsu Nagasaku	October 4, 2009	August 8, 2010
Edward and Ling face off against Envy. Edward hesitates to attack, due to the many people embedded into Envy's body and is swallowed. Meanwhile, Scar and May find Shao Mei, Alphonse, and Gluttony. They follow them into a tunnel where they are forced to fight off several chimeras. Edward spots Envy's philosopher's stone, and after combining it with the missing piece from the ruins of Xerxes he found in Gluttony's stomach, he plans a way to escape with Envy's help. Meanwhile, Bradley explains to Mustang how he was trained from birth for leadership and was injected with the philosopher's stone making him a homunculus. Inside Gluttony, Edward reluctantly uses the souls inside the stone to transmute himself and open the Gate of Truth for Ling and Envy to escape. At the Gate, Edward finds Alphonse's emaciated body, but fails to retrieve it, since it is not his. However, before the gate closes, he tells him that he will return for him someday.
27	"Interlude Party"; Transliteration: "Hazama no Utage" (Japanese: 狭間の宴)	Directed by : Tsutomu Yabuki; Storyboarded by : Yoshimitsu Ōhashi	Yoneki Tsumura	Ryousuke Sekiguchi	October 11, 2009	January 9, 2011
In a clip show episode, Hohenheim is shown years ago at a festival in Resembool where he converses with a young Pinako. He remains apart from all the villagers and espouses his philosophy that humans are foolish, pitiful creatures. Snippets of the events to date are shown. Hohenheim wakes up from a drunken dream after departing Resembool to pursue his ambitions.
28	"Father"; Transliteration: "Otō-sama" (Japanese: おとうさま)	Directed by : Tōru Ishida; Storyboarded by : Iwao Teraoka	Shōtarō Suga	Masaru Oshiro	October 18, 2009	January 16, 2011
Alphonse and Gluttony arrive at Father's lair, where Edward, Ling, and Envy burst out of Gluttony's stomach. Father uses his special powers to disable Edward and Alphonse's alchemy. Father plants the philosopher's stone on Ling. The stone, containing Greed's surviving remains, awakens and takes over Ling's body. Scar and May meet Father in battle, using alchemy. Edward tells Scar that Envy triggered the Ishval civil war. Father disables Scar from using alchemy. Edward battles Greed, but is quickly subdued, although he senses that Ling is still inside Greed. Scar uses the exploding hydrogen, and escapes from the lair with Edward, Alphonse, Ling, and May. Father extracts Gluttony's philosopher's stone, absorbing it into himself and promising to revive Gluttony with his memories intact.
29	"Struggle of the Fool"; Transliteration: "Gusha no Agaki" (Japanese: 愚者の足掻き)	Directed by : Daisuke Tsukushi; Storyboarded by : Minoru Ōhara	Seishi Minakami	Kazunori Hashimoto & Hiroshi Kobayashi	October 25, 2009	January 23, 2011
Envy leads Edward and Alphonse out of Father's hideout which is under Central Command Headquarters. With May and Shao Mei hidden inside Alphonse's armor, Envy takes them to meet Bradley who reveals that he is Wrath. Edward tries to resign from the state military, but Wrath threatens to kill Winry unless he remains a state alchemist. However, he allows the Elric brothers to continue their research. Bradley denies killing Hughes when asked by Mustang, but avoids naming the killer. Meanwhile, Scar encounters Marcoh who is imprisoned and admits to being involved in the extermination of the Ishvalans. Later, Mustang reveals Bradley's true identity to Armstrong, pondering that there may be someone controlling Bradley. Alphonse takes May to be treated by Knox, with a message from Greed/Ling for Lan Fan telling her that he has a philosopher's stone. Edward, upon hearing that other alchemists failed to transmute at the same time his abilities were blocked by Father, wonders how Scar and May were still able to use theirs. Meanwhile, Marcoh asks Scar to kill him, but Scar demands to know more about Marcoh's involvement in the civil war.
30	"The Ishvalan War of Extermination"; Transliteration: "Ishuvāru Senmetsusen" (Japanese: イシュヴァール殲滅戦)	Directed by : Ikurō Satō; Storyboarded by : Shinji Ishihira	Hiroshi Ōnogi	Tetsuya Kawakami	November 1, 2009	January 30, 2011
Years ago, Mustang's desire to become a state alchemist was disapproved of by his dying teacher, Berthold Hawkeye. He asked Mustang to look after his daughter who has the details of his flame alchemy research – tattooed on her back. In the present, Edward returns Riza Hawkeye's gun, explaining his inability to pull the trigger. Marcoh reveals to Scar that after the civil war had continued for seven years, Bradley signed a document approving the extermination of the Ishvalans. The killing took an emotional toll on many state alchemists and soldiers, including Hughes and Mustang. Marcoh confesses that he was involved in using Ishvalans to make the philosopher's stone, which was given to the heartless state alchemist Major Solf J. Kimblee. The Ishvalan leader pleaded with Bradley to end the killing in exchange for his life, but his request was rejected. When the civil war finally ended, Mustang resolved to become a new Führer to protect the people, and appointed Hawkeye as his second-in-command. Hawkeye tells Edward that when they finally achieve peace, they may be punished for the crimes they committed during the war. Meanwhile, Envy checks Marcoh's prison cell and finds a beheaded corpse with the word "vengeance" written in blood on the wall.
31	"The 520 Cens Promise"; Transliteration: "Gohyaku Nijū Senzu no Yakusoku" (Japanese: 520センズの約束)	Kiyomitsu Satō	Michihiro Tsuchiya	Hiroya Iijima	November 8, 2009	February 6, 2011
After contemplating why Scar and May could transmute when the alchemy of others was blocked at the time, Edward and Alphonse decide to search for May and Shao Mei. Meanwhile, Mustang's subordinates say their goodbyes as they are sent to different state military bases. Mustang later reminds Edward that he owes him five hundred and twenty cens, but Edward decides to keep the money until Mustang becomes Führer. Mustang uses the note he received from Falman to make contact with Commanding Officer Grumman. Meanwhile, Fu is shocked to find Lan Fan had lost her arm, yet they decline to seek an automail replacement. Later, Knox has a visit from his wife and son, who are pleased to hear he treated two live patients. Suspecting that Marcoh had escaped with Scar, Envy releases Kimblee from prison and gives him the task of retrieving Marcoh and killing Scar. Wanting to find out more about Kimblee and the secrets behind his brother's alchemy, Scar deforms Marcoh's face so he will not be recognized before heading north to recover his brother's notes.
32	"The Fuhrer's Son"; Transliteration: "Daisōtō no Musuko" (Japanese: 大総統の息子)	Directed by : Tsutomu Yabuki; Storyboarded by : Hitoshi Nanba	Hiroshi Ōnogi	Kenichi Ōnuki	November 15, 2009	February 13, 2011
As May catches a train north with a hooded person, Scar heads west by train with another person. Grumman, disguised as a woman, meets Mustang to discuss the current situation and reveals that he saw May at the railway station. Mustang asks Armstrong to pass the information onto Edward, who is in the library searching for notes on alkahestry. Armstrong also gives Edward a letter of introduction to his sister, Major General Olivier Mira Armstrong at Briggs Fortress. Meanwhile, Edward and Alphonse inadvertently meet the Führer's seemingly naive adopted son, Selim Bradley, and are invited to his house. There, they meet the Führer's wife and are later joined by the Führer himself. After the meeting, the Elric brothers also catch a train north, following May. Meanwhile, Kimblee attacks Scar's train, but Scar and his companion leave the train and travel on by foot, leaving Kimblee to predict Scar's next move.
33	"The Northern Wall of Briggs"; Transliteration: "Burigguzu no Hokuheki" (Japanese: ブリッグズの北壁)	Directed by : Hiroshi Ikehata; Storyboarded by : Shinji Ishihira	Shōtarō Suga	Ryousuke Sekiguchi	November 22, 2009	February 20, 2011
Kimblee deduces that Scar is headed north. He manages to catch up to the train Scar is riding, only to find his hooded companion is Yoki and not Marcoh. Scar and Kimblee recognize each other from their encounter in Ishval, and a fight ensues. Scar impales Kimblee who manages to separate the train carriages and escape. Meanwhile, May continues north with Marcoh, while Edward and Alphonse arrive at the mountain path leading to Briggs Fortress. They are attacked by Captain Buccaneer before being surrounded and captured by the guards and taken before Olivier. Meanwhile, May and Marcoh manage to find research notes written by Scar's brother and begin to decipher them.
34	"Ice Queen"; Transliteration: "Kōri no Joō" (Japanese: 氷の女王)	Directed by : Keiko Oyamada; Storyboarded by : Nobuo Tomisawa	Shōtarō Suga	Taichi Furumata & Teiichi Takiguchi	November 29, 2009	February 27, 2011
Edward learns that his steel automail is not suited for the cold weather at Briggs Fortress. Olivier asks the Elric brothers about the purpose of their arrival, but they only mention their search for May, intriguing Olivier because of her interest in alkahestry. Edward has a challenging encounter with Major Miles who is part Ishvalan, and they also run into Falman who has been posted to Briggs. Suddenly, the homunculus named Sloth appears from underground, and Olivier is surprised at his invulnerability. Edward holds back his knowledge about the homunculus, only mentioning that its makeup is similar to that of a human, which gives Olivier an idea on how to defeat it.
35	"The Shape of This Country"; Transliteration: "Kono Kuni no Katachi" (Japanese: この国のかたち)	Directed by : Takahiro Ikezoe; Storyboarded by : Yoshimitsu Ōhashi	Seishi Minakami	Tomokatsu Nagasaku	December 6, 2009	March 6, 2011
Olivier and her crew manage to subdue Sloth by dousing him in fuel and forcing him outside to freeze. Olivier then has the Elric brothers arrested so she can learn more about the homunculus. General Raven visits Kimblee in hospital, who secretly has two philosopher's stones, and brings along another state alchemist to heal his wounds. Meanwhile, Marcoh continues to look into alkahestry, with May teaching him how it works. Edward, Alphonse, Olivier, Buccaneer, and Falman investigate the tunnel that Sloth used to invade Briggs. While there, Olivier presses the Elrics for more information. Edward and Falman deduce that the tunnel is being used as a giant transmutation circle to connect sites for the creation of a philosopher's stone, and that Amestris was formed for that purpose. Later, Olivier talks with Raven, soliciting information about the creation of immortal armies while the others listen in on their conversation.
36	"Family Portrait"; Transliteration: "Kazoku no Shōzō" (Japanese: 家族の肖像)	Directed by : Ikurō Satō; Storyboarded by : Minoru Ōhara	Michihiro Tsuchiya	Chiyomi Tsukamoto & Minefumi Harada	December 13, 2009	March 13, 2011
Hohenheim recalls the time thirteen years ago when he left his family, lamenting that his body would outlast that of his wife and sons. Meanwhile, soldiers investigating the tunnels under Briggs Fortress find themselves under attack by a mysterious shadow. Raven tells Olivier to put Sloth back into the tunnel and seal it off. While Miles stalls Kimblee for time, Olivier kills Raven. As Olivier shows a few of her men a separate entrance to the tunnel, Kimblee brings Winry over to see Edward and Alphonse, reminding them of their place and situation. Meanwhile, Scar and Yoki reunite with May and Marcoh, and Mustang receives information about the events in Briggs from his intelligence sources and a message from Olivier.
37	"The First Homunculus"; Transliteration: "Hajimari no Homunkurusu" (Japanese: 始まりの人造人間(ホムンクルス))	Directed by : Shigeru Ueda; Storyboarded by : Iwao Teraoka	Michihiro Tsuchiya	Kanta Suzuki	December 20, 2009	March 20, 2011
Edward has his automail upgraded by Winry, while Kimblee issues orders to keep Alphonse separated from Edward. Olivier sends a search party down into the tunnels to search for the missing troops. They find a couple of survivors who warn them not to turn any lights on or a monster will come. Hawkeye discovers that Selim is the first homunculus called Pride, who attacks from the shadows. Kimblee orders Edward to search for Scar and Marcoh, and to create a blood crest similar to Ishval in Briggs Fortress. He tempts Edward with a philosopher's stone if he accepts. After telling Alphonse and Winry about the situation, Edward accepts the job, although Alphonse suspects that Edward does not intend to use the stone. As the Elric brothers leave to search for Scar, Winry decides to accompany them, suspecting their real intent is to find May and learn Xingese alkahestry.
38	"Conflict at Baschool"; Transliteration: "Bazukūru no Gekitō" (Japanese: バズクールの激闘)	Directed by : Tōru Ishida; Storyboarded by : Shinji Ishihira	Yoneki Tsumura	Masaru Oshiro	December 27, 2009	March 27, 2011
Hawkeye receives a call from Mustang, but feels unable to say anything for fear of being overheard by Pride. In the town of Baschool, the Elric brothers and Winry lose the guards who were assigned to them. They run into May, Marcoh, and Yoki who explains in detail how he was banished from the state military because of the Elric brothers. Elsewhere in Baschool, Scar encounters a pair of Kimblee's chimeras named Jerso and Zampano, and is pinned down by them. However, the Elric brothers arrive, astop the chimeras, and restrain Scar themselves. Winry and Miles arrive, and Winry confronts Scar about the truth. Kimblee discovers Scar taking Winry hostage and making the explosion. Meanwhile, as Olivier's squad retrieve the survivors from the tunnels, Briggs Fortress is approached by more forces from Central Command Headquarters.
39	"Daydream"; Transliteration: "Hakuchū no Yume" (Japanese: 白昼の夢)	Directed by : Shingo Uchida; Storyboarded by : Tsutomu Yabuki	Seishi Minakami	Satoshi Hata	January 10, 2010	April 3, 2011
When faced with the option of judging the man who killed her parents, Winry decides to forgive Scar, knowing it would be something her parents would do. Miles explains to Scar that he joined the military to gradually change the way people think of Ishvalans and agrees to help Edward. Since May and Marcoh need Scar to decipher his brother's research, Miles offers to hide everyone at the fort, with Alphonse insisting on sparing the two chimeras. Winry comes up with a ruse plan about Scar pretending to kidnap her and eluding Kimblee. Scar and company head for the fort via tunnels in the mine, just before a blizzard sets in. Miles receives a word that Olivier is no longer commander of Briggs as it is now being controlled by state alchemists. Alphonse willingly goes into the blizzard to find and warn the group and briefly sees his body, and wonders if it is trying to retrieve its soul. Meanwhile, Father makes alchemic plans involving Alphonse, Edward, Hohenheim, and Izumi, and seeks one more candidate.
40	"Homunculus (The Dwarf in the Flask)"; Transliteration: "Furasuko no Naka no Kobito (Homunkurusu)" (Japanese: フラスコの中の小人(ホムンクルス) (Note: The ruby text in this case is used to provide a subtitle rather than serve as Japanese phonology.))	Directed by : Shūji Miyahara; Storyboarded by : Yoshimitsu Ōhashi	Hiroshi Ōnogi	Tetsuya Kawakami	January 17, 2010	April 10, 2011
Olivier reports to Bradley at Central where she admits to killing Raven but convinces Bradley to let her take his place. Meanwhile, Hawkeye uses a coded message to tell Roy Mustang that Selim is a homunculus. In his lair, Father daydreams of the time in ancient Xerxes, where the nameless slave, known only as Number 23, met Homunculus, a being in a flask who was created from his blood. It gave Hohenheim his current name and taught him the basics of alchemy. Homunculus promised to make the King of Xerxes immortal, and told the king to make a gigantic transmutation circle. At the appointed time, Hohenheim stood at the center of the circle with Homunculus, and the whole country, including the king became a sacrifice. When Hohenheim awoke, everyone in Xerxes was dead, except for him and Homunculus who had created a body shaped like Hohenheim for itself, calling itself Father. Back in the present, Hohenheim encounters Izumi and Sig, noticing her poor health for committing the ultimate sin. He rearranges Izumi's organs so that her blood can flow better, saying that she can't die yet and explaining that he is a philosopher's stone in human form.
41	"The Abyss"; Transliteration: "Naraku" (Japanese: 奈落)	Directed by : Hiroshi Ikehata; Storyboarded by : Tadashi Jūmonji	Michihiro Tsuchiya	Kenichi Ōnuki	January 24, 2010	April 17, 2011
Miles plans to kill Kimblee and his two henchmen, over Edward's objections. As Scar and company exit the mine, they find Alphonse, who warns them about Central Command Headquarters controlling Briggs Fortress, so Scar leads them towards an Ishvalan slum. Miles attempts to snipe at Kimblee, but Kimblee detects the trap and uses a cover of snow to enter the mines. Edward follows but is attacked by Kimblee's chimeras, Darius and Heinkel. Edward disables them by using the ammonia in dynamite to overwhelm their high sense of smell. Edward then knocks the philosopher's stone out of Kimblee's hand, but Kimblee uses another philosopher's stone hidden inside his mouth to create a massive explosion, sending Edward and the chimeras down a mine shaft where Edward is impaled by a steel bar. Meanwhile, Alphonse starts to drift out of consciousness, feeling that his soul is being drawn back to his body. Edward asks the chimeras to remove the bar while he sacrifices some of his life span to temporarily fix the wound and to stop the bleeding. The chimeras then find the philosopher's stone that Kimblee dropped, and decide to take Edward to a doctor.
42	"Signs of a Counteroffensive"; Transliteration: "Hangeki no Kizashi" (Japanese: 反撃の兆し)	Directed by : Kiyomitsu Satō; Storyboarded by : Minoru Ōhara	Shōtarō Suga	Hiroya Iijima	January 31, 2010	April 24, 2011
Alphonse awakes, realizing he was dismantled by the group to carry him back to the tunnels. As they reassemble him, May deciphers a code in the notes written by Scar's brother by rearranging and overlapping the pages, which reveal the nationwide Amestris transmutation circle. After accidentally flipping some of the pages, they assemble another alkahestry transmutation circle that will neutralize the first. Meanwhile, Kimblee encounters Pride, who tells Kimblee to carve out the Briggs Fortress blood crest. Elsewhere, Falman contacts Breda, and Sloth finishes digging the tunnels. Hohenheim arrives in Liore, where Rosé and the other citizens are rebuilding, and finds an underground passage under the church of Leto. As he stumbles upon Sloth's tunnels, he is attacked by Pride but manages to escape beyond its limit and then tells Pride to let Father know he will be coming. Meanwhile, Kimblee conspires with the Drachman military to attack Briggs Fortress, and Zampano informs Envy of Marcoh's location.
43	"Bite of the Ant"; Transliteration: "Ari no Hito Kami" (Japanese: 蟻のひと噛み)	Directed by : Takahiro Ikezoe; Storyboarded by : Iwao Teraoka	Yoneki Tsumura	Tomokatsu Nagasaku	February 7, 2010	May 1, 2011
Briggs Fortress defeats the Drachman military forces with ease, their bodies laying in the snow carving out the blood crest. Zampano takes a disguised Envy to Marcoh. Envy attacks Marcoh who reveals that it was a trap and Envy is outsmarted by the multiple alkahestry traps set up by May. In anger, Envy reverts to his beast-like form and begins to attack the group. However, after being captured by the beast, Marcoh destroys the philosopher's stone inside Envy, reducing him to his real form, a tiny, parasitic creature. Scar gives it to May and tells her to return to her country. Marcoh and Scar go their own way, and Alphonse and the rest head for Liore. In Dublith, Bido, the last remaining chimera under Greed, sees two military officers searching for Izumi. Thinking that they could lead him to Greed, he hides underneath their car. Olivier is told about the fort's victory, and one of the superior officers shows her a secret and forbidden incubation facility for the creation of humanoids. Meanwhile arriving in Liore, Alphonse's group meet Rosé as well as someone appearing to be Hohenheim.
44	"Revving at Full Throttle"; Transliteration: "Barinbarin no Zenkai" (Japanese: バリンバリンの全開)	Directed by : Keiko Oyamada; Storyboarded by : Nobuo Tomisawa	Seishi Minakami	Hiroaki Noguchi & Teiichi Takiguchi	February 14, 2010	May 8, 2011
Alphonse and Winry are welcomed by Rosé and the people of Liore. Meanwhile, Darius, one of the chimeras who helped Edward, makes a withdrawal at a bank from Edward's state alchemist research account. However, the state military is informed and they storm the clinic where Edward is being treated, but the trio manage to escape. Meanwhile, Hohenheim tells Alphonse the truth about himself, his involvement with Father and the coming Promised Day while Alphonse tells him of their own plans. While Olivier is shown the army of humanoids being created by the military, Bido reunites with Greed, but he inadvertently kills him, despite forgetting and remembering each other. Angered at seeing Greed kill one of his own friends, Ling's conscience viciously clashes with Greed's, while Greed's memories of his time in Dublith with his chimera comrades begins to resurface. That night, Greed confronts Bradley at the mansion.
45	"The Promised Day"; Transliteration: "Yakusoku no Hi" (Japanese: 約束の日)	Directed by : Ikurō Satō; Storyboarded by : Yoshimitsu Ōhashi	Michihiro Tsuchiya	Ryousuke Sekiguchi & Jun Shibata	February 21, 2010	May 15, 2011
Greed is overwhelmed in his fight with Bradley, but he manages to survive and escape. Meanwhile, Olivier requests that her father determine succession to the household, which leads to a fight she inevitably wins against her brother. However, it's mainly a ruse to protect her family who then leave the country on holiday. May passes through Youswell, where the people offer to help her journey back to Xing, but Envy tricks her into heading back to Central. Edward, Darius, and Heinkel arrive at one of the old hideouts in Central looking for Alphonse, only to be surprised by the arrival of Ling who had temporarily regained control over his body. Ling tells Edward that Father will try to open the gate on the Promised Day. When Greed regains control, Edward suggests that he become his ally since he has severed relationships with the homunculi. Instead, Greed jokingly says they can work for him and Edward surprisingly accepts the offer. Meanwhile, Alphonse passes a message through Izumi to Miles, and through their allies in the military to Mustang, warning everyone about the Promised Day which is scheduled to take place next spring.
46	"Looming Shadows"; Transliteration: "Semaru Kage" (Japanese: 迫る影)	Tsutomu Yabuki	Hiroshi Ōnogi	Souichirou Sako & Chiyomi Tsukamoto	February 28, 2010	May 22, 2011
Briggs Fortress soldiers escort Winry back home, where she is surprised to find Edward and his group. Edward warns her to escape to another country, but she refuses and says that Edward should ensure he protects everyone. Meanwhile, Scar has recruited several Ishvalans to help in his cause. Alphonse, who had been suffering from more frequent blackouts, is ambushed and captured by Gluttony and Pride. At the Armstrong household, Mustang secretly reveals Selim's true identity to Olivier. On the day before the Promised Day, Bradley is tricked into taking a train back to Central and is caught in an explosion on a rail bridge. Meanwhile, Hawkeye, Breda, and Fuery prepare for the upcoming day. Within the military, as the chosen generals are panicking over the Führer's possible death, Olivier sees her chance to try to take control. However, before she can do anything, she is halted by the sudden appearance of Father and Sloth.
47	"Emissary of Darkness"; Transliteration: "Yami no Shisha" (Japanese: 闇の使者)	Directed by : Shigeru Ueda; Storyboarded by : Minoru Ōhara	Seishi Minakami	Kanta Suzuki	March 7, 2010	May 29, 2011
Hohenheim tells Edward's group about the Promised Day, and in return Edward tells him Trisha's dying words. Edward's group leave, only to run into Alphonse in the forest, controlled by Pride. Pride attacks the group and appears to get the upper hand, but Edward blacks out the slums, removing the light source and denying Pride the use of shadows. In total darkness, Heinkel uses his hunting abilities to find and attack Pride. Meanwhile, Gluttony appears and attacks Edward, Greed, and Darius. Greed, disadvantaged in the dark, agrees to switch places with Ling who uses his detection abilities to fight Gluttony. As Gluttony transforms into the devouring gateway, he is overwhelmed and shredded by the sudden intervention of Lan Fan, who is now equipped with an automail arm.
48	"The Oath in the Tunnel"; Transliteration: "Chikadō no Chikai" (Japanese: 地下道の誓い)	Directed by : Hisatoshi Shimizu; Storyboarded by : Iwao Teraoka	Shōtarō Suga	Tetsuya Kawakami	March 14, 2010	June 5, 2011
Ling and Lan Fan fight Gluttony, while Heinkel continues to fight Pride. Meanwhile, Mustang visits Madame Christmas at her hostess bar, informing her that Selim is a homunculus. Pride manages to overwhelm Heinkel. However, before Pride can finish him off, Edward intervenes and saves Heinkel using his automail which is now reinforced with carbon. Spies from Central follow Mustang to the bar, then receive news that Madame Christmas is his foster mother. The bar suddenly explodes, and Mustang escapes into the sewers with Madame Christmas and they part ways. He then meets up with Hawkeye, Breda, and Fuery and confirms his plan to take over Central. Pride takes over Alphonse's armor again and prepares to fight Edward, but Fu throws a flash bomb into the air overwhelming the shadows with light and breaking Pride's control. Darius then takes Alphonse to safety, while Gluttony stumbles into the fight between Edward and Pride. Upon discovering that Ling and Lan Fan can sense homunculi, Pride consumes Gluttony, both to replenish his life as well as to gain a sense of smell that can detect Edward's group, and even Hohenheim who is nearby. Back in Central, Mustang makes the first move in his plot by capturing Bradley's wife.
49	"Filial Affection"; Transliteration: "Oyako no Jō" (Japanese: 親子の情)	Directed by : Tōru Ishida; Storyboarded by : Yoshimitsu Ōhashi	Yoneki Tsumura	Masaru Oshiro	March 21, 2010	June 12, 2011
Edward, Greed, and Lan Fan have a difficult time fighting Pride, following his assimilation of Gluttony. Alphonse intentionally allows himself to be captured by Pride so that Hohenheim can encase them in a mountain of soil devoid of light, preventing Pride from using his shadows powers. Meanwhile, Kimblee begins to move just as Scar's group is told about the bombing of Bradley's train. As the Promised Day begins, Greed goes to Central on his own while both Edward and Scar's groups meet up again to devise a plan. In Central, Mustang and his subordinates begin to attack soldiers while using Bradley's wife as a hostage. However, Brigadier General Clemin gives the order to kill everybody in the group, except Mustang.
50	"Upheaval in Central"; Transliteration: "Sentoraru Dōran" (Japanese: セントラル動乱)	Directed by : Keiko Oyamada; Storyboarded by : Nobuo Tomisawa	Michihiro Tsuchiya	Hiroaki Noguchi & Teiichi Takiguchi	March 28, 2010	June 19, 2011
Mustang's small team are cornered by the Central soldiers, however Mustang's old Ishval squadron arrive and saves them. Meanwhile, the Briggs Fortress soldiers, led by Buccaneer, join the battle. As Mustang's team begins to run low on ammunition, they are saved by Maria Ross and Rebecca Catalina with a truckload of weapons and ammunition. Mustang calls to thank Ross's weapons supplier and he is surprised to hear the crippled Havoc at the other end. At headquarters, Olivier tires of the bumbling Central military and stabs one general and kills Lieutenant General Gardiner. During the chaos, Edward's group sneaks back into Central via the tunnels and then into Central via the third laboratory. Edward, Scar, Darius, Jerso, and Zampano go in one direction while Hohenheim and Lan Fan go in the other. However, in frustration at the delay in stopping Mustang, and ignoring the protests of a lab member who says they have not yet completed their trials, a member of the Senior Staff awakens the humanoid mannequin soldiers.
51	"The Immortal Legion"; Transliteration: "Fushi no Gundan" (Japanese: 不死の軍団)	Directed by : Kiyomitsu Satō; Storyboarded by : Hitoshi Nanba	Seishi Minakami	Hiroya Iijima	April 4, 2010	June 26, 2011
The Senior Staff member orders the mannequin soldiers to attack the invading troops, but instead they attack and begin to devour him. Edward opens the door where Alphonse had earlier fought against Lust, and the mannequin soldiers emerge from it eager to feed. Meanwhile, Olivier is attacked by Sloth, who had been ordered to kill her. Alphonse and Heinkel learn too late that Pride had been sending a morse code message from banging a stick on Alphonse's head, and they are soon attacked by Kimblee who frees Pride from his imprisonment. In the sewers, May is also attacked by the mannequin soldiers. Envy is freed in the struggle and manages to merge with them, returning to his humanoid form. As Olivier struggles against Sloth, Armstrong arrives and joins the fight. Alphonse transmutes his legs off in order to help Heinkel, who then gives him the philosopher's stone that Kimblee had previously lost in the mine explosion. Alphonse reluctantly uses it to restore his legs, and then prepares to challenge Pride and Kimblee.
52	"Combined Strength"; Transliteration: "Minna no Chikara" (Japanese: みんなの力)	Directed by : Shūji Miyahara; Storyboarded by : Masahiro Andō	Michihiro Tsuchiya	Satoshi Ishino & Kenichi Ōnuki	April 11, 2010	July 3, 2011
Alphonse begins using the philosopher's stone to battle Pride and Kimblee. He manages to trap Pride once again, but is taken by surprise by Kimblee using his own stone. Meanwhile, as the Armstrong siblings gain the upper hand over Sloth, he reveals himself to be the fastest homunculus. Alphonse is caught by Pride again, but meanwhile Heinkel had been healed by Marcoh and manages to bite Kimblee on the neck, delivering a fatal blow. Yoki arrives by vehicle to rescue Alphonse and the others and they drive towards Central while Pride consumes Kimblee and his stone. Armstrong manages to temporarily impale Sloth on a spike, but he and Olivier are then attacked by mannequin soldiers while below, May fends off Envy and more mannequin soldiers in a tunnel. Meanwhile Edward's group, about overwhelmed by the mannequin soldiers, is rescued by the arrival of Mustang and Hawkeye.
53	"Flame of Vengeance"; Transliteration: "Fukushū no Honō" (Japanese: 復讐の炎)	Directed by : Takahiro Ikezoe; Storyboarded by : Minoru Ōhara	Hiroshi Ōnogi	Tomokatsu Nagasaku	April 18, 2010	July 10, 2011
Mustang's team arranges for Bradley's wife to be interviewed on a live radio broadcast, and with the help of the Ishvalans, word of a supposed coup d'état spreads. The citizens begin to support the rebels, while Briggs Fortress troops launch an attack on Central Command Headquarters. Meanwhile, Mustang easily destroys the mannequin soldiers surrounding Edward's group by burning them to ash. May lures Envy into a trap in the upper levels, causing them both to fall into the chamber below with Edward's group. Envy is led to reveal himself as Hughes' killer, infuriating Mustang who unleashes a torrent of flames at Envy. Edward's group moves onward as Mustang brutally burns Envy, but Edward is concerned that Mustang may become consumed by his own hatred. Envy realizes he is no match for Mustang and flees for his life. Also concerned by Mustang's behaviour, Hawkeye follows Mustang into the tunnels, but is seen by Envy. Mustang later encounters Hawkeye, who aims a gun at him as he turns his back.
54	"Beyond the Inferno"; Transliteration: "Rekka no Saki ni" (Japanese: 烈火の先に)	Directed by : Ikurō Satō; Storyboarded by : Yoshimitsu Ōhashi	Shōtarō Suga	Hiroki Kanno & Ryousuke Sekiguchi	April 25, 2010	July 17, 2011
In a flashback to the Ishval war, Hawkeye asks Mustang to burn her father's notes on Flame Alchemy from her back. In the present, Hawkeye sees through Envy's disguise as Mustang and Hawkeye shoots Envy until Mustang arrives and mercilessly incinerates the homunculus, reverting him back to his parasitic form. Before Mustang can kill Envy, Edward, Hawkeye and Scar persuade him to stop his anger and need for revenge, with Edward arguing that Amestris cannot be ruled by someone consumed with hatred. Envy becomes outraged by Mustang's change of heart and tries to goad them into killing each other by pointing out all of the terrible things they have done to each other. Edward concludes that Envy hates humans because he is jealous of their capacity to continue living despite all the abuse they take. Humiliated and insulted by Edward's analysis, Envy commits suicide by tearing out and destroying his own philosopher's stone. Meanwhile, the Armstrong siblings slowly gain the upper hand in their battle against Sloth. Izumi allied with the Briggs Fortress soldiers arrives in Central to participate in the coup d'état. Meanwhile below Central, Hohenheim confronts Father alone.
55	"The Adults' Way of Life"; Transliteration: "Otona-tachi no Ikizama" (Japanese: 大人たちの生き様)	Directed by : Hiroshi Ikehata; Storyboarded by : Nobuo Tomisawa	Michihiro Tsuchiya	Teiichi Takiguchi & Yumiko Shirai	May 2, 2010	July 24, 2011
The Armstrong siblings have trouble fighting off both Sloth and the mannequin soldiers until Izumi and Sig arrive. Through their combined efforts, they manage to inflict enough damage on Sloth to finally kill him before turning their attention to the mannequin soldiers. Meanwhile, Father attacks Hohenheim underground and in the midst of the battle, Hohenheim asserts that Father created the homuncului as a substitute family. Father attempts to take the philosopher's stone from within Hohenheim, but is unable to do so. Briggs Fortress soldiers declare the majority of the Central Command Headquarters captured and start to celebrate, however Bradley, still alive, approaches the headquarters, promising to reclaim it.
56	"The Return of the Fuhrer"; Transliteration: "Daisōtō no Kikan" (Japanese: 大総統の帰還)	Directed by : Tōru Ishida; Storyboarded by : Iwao Teraoka	Hiroshi Ōnogi	Chiyomi Tsukamoto & Masaru Oshiro	May 9, 2010	July 31, 2011
A flashback shows Hohenheim's escape into the desert after the destruction of Xerxes and rescue by Xing merchants. In the present, Hohenheim reveals that when Father tried to steal his philosopher's stone, he infused souls from within the stone into Father's body to destroy it from the inside. However, Father is able to survive outside of the skin which is his container and shows his true form. Meanwhile, Bradley begins his solo attack on the headquarters and decimates the defending forces, even destroying Buccaneer's automail arm and rallying the Central forces who regroup. As Bradley reaches the battlements above the front gate, he is challenged by Greed, so Bradley reveals his hidden ultimate eye and counterattacks. Buccaneer allows himself to be stabbed in order to remove Bradley's sword, although Bradley soon arms himself with daggers. Meanwhile, Central soldiers are reinforced by the 3rd Guards Battalion under Gamelan, so Falman and the remaining Briggs Fortress fight a defensive action. Suddenly Fu arrives and launches his own attack on Bradley.
57	"Eternal Leave"; Transliteration: "Eien no Itoma" (Japanese: 永遠の暇(いとま))	Directed by : Yoshifumi Sueda; Storyboarded by : Hitoshi Nanba	Seishi Minakami	Koichi Horikawa & Atsushi Aono	May 16, 2010	August 7, 2011
Greed and Fu both attack Bradley, but Greed gets pinned down, forcing Fu to fight Bradley alone. Fu attempts a suicide attack using explosives strapped to his chest, but Bradley defuses them and mortally wounds Fu. However, Buccaneer thrusts a sword through Fu's body before he falls and into Bradley's stomach, allowing Ling to scratch out his ultimate eye. Lan Fan arrives to witness her grandfather's death. Meanwhile underground, Edward's group encounters the gold-toothed doctor who created Bradley, and is pitted against the numerous rejected Führer candidates. The doctor then activates a transmutation circle connected to the five research labs in Central, which absorbs Edward, Alphonse, and Izumi.
58	"Sacrifices"; Transliteration: "Hitobashira" (Japanese: ひとばしら)	Directed by : Kiyomitsu Satō; Storyboarded by : Iwao Teraoka	Hiroshi Ōnogi	Takeshi Yoshioka & Tsunenori Saito	May 23, 2010	August 14, 2011
During the fierce fight between Ling and Bradley on the battlements, Bradley falls into the moat below and Ling is distraught at his inability to save Fu. As Buccaneer lies dying, he makes a final request to Ling to defend the front gate. Ling complies and draws upon the full power of Greed's ultimate shield to annihilate all the Central forces before the gate. Underground, Edward and Izumi, with an unconscious Alphonse, reappear in Father's lair to find Hohenheim subdued and embedded within the Homunculus. With four of the five human sacrifices in hand, Father is left to wait for the fifth. The gold-toothed doctor in the levels above, orders Hawkeye's throat to be slit, telling Mustang that he will only save her if he performs human transmutation as the fifth candidate, to which he agrees.
59	"Lost Light"; Transliteration: "Ushinawareta Hikari" (Japanese: 失われた光)	Directed by : Hisatoshi Shimizu; Storyboarded by : Masahiro Andō	Hiroshi Ōnogi	Tetsuya Kawakami	May 30, 2010	August 21, 2011
After Mustang agrees to perform a human transmutation, Hawkeye signals him with her eyes and he refuses to proceed. Suddenly, May arrives with Jerso, Zampano and Darius who take control while May stops Hawkeye's bleeding. At that moment, Bradley (Wrath) appears and picks up the philosopher's stone dropped on the floor. However, Pride also arrives and they force Mustang to perform a human transmutation, using the gold-toothed doctor as a sacrifice. Mustang passes through the Gate of Truth and appears in Father's lair with Pride and the other sacrifices, finding he has lost his eyesight in exchange. While Scar battles Wrath in the chamber above Father's lair, May crashes through the ceiling to find Alphonse unconscious. Meanwhile, Alphonse stands before the gate and sees his frail body, despairing that it cannot be used to fight alongside the others. Leaving, he promises to return for his body and returns through the gate. Regaining consciousness in Father's lair, Alphonse completes the count of five sacrifices for the Homunculus.
60	"Eye of Heaven, Gateway of Earth"; Transliteration: "Ten no Hitomi, Chi no Tobira" (Japanese: 天の瞳、地の扉)	Directed by : Shūji Miyahara; Storyboarded by : Iwao Teraoka	Hiroshi Ōnogi	Hiroki Kanno, Tomokatsu Nagasaku & Satoshi Ishino	June 6, 2010	August 28, 2011
Edward and Alphonse battle Pride, as May takes on the Homunculus Father herself. Above ground, the Ishvalans lay alkahestry transmutation circles throughout Amestris. In his continuing fight against Wrath, Scar uses a reconstruction transmutation circle from his brother's research which is now tattooed on his other arm. Edward's group starts to gain the upper hand against Father, but despite the arrival of Greed, Father grabs the four sacrifices and Hohenheim to create his transmutation circle as the solar eclipse reaches its zenith. The transmutation absorbs all the souls in Amestris and gives Father enough power to open a gateway from earth, allowing him to unlock the entrance to Heaven and absorb the Being within, the Eye of God.
61	"He Who Would Swallow God"; Transliteration: "Kami o Nomikomishi Mono" (Japanese: 神を呑みこみし者)	Directed by : Tōru Ishida; Storyboarded by : Iwao Teraoka	Hiroshi Ōnogi	Chiyomi Tsukamoto & Masaru Oshiro	June 13, 2010	September 4, 2011
Those present in Father's lair survive the human transmutation, discovering the Homunculus has used over fifty million Amestrian souls to suppress the Eye of God within a reborn body. Father neutralizes the use of alchemy and prepares to annihilate them. However over the years, Hohenheim had placed fragments of his own philosopher's stone across the country to neutralize the transmutation circle. These stone fragments are activated by the eclipse's umbra, and the human souls are ripped from Father. He is weakened and forced to relinquish the Eye of God. Father then attacks Edward's group but May's alkahestry combined with Hohenheim's philosopher's stone resist him. Above, Scar manages to deliver a fatal blow when Bradley is blinded by sunlight as the sun re-emerges. Scar then activates the nationwide alkahestry circle prepared by his fellow Ishvalans which restores alchemy to its greatest potential. Father heads above ground searching for more souls to replenish his stone supply and is chased by Edward's team. Edward stays to fight Pride who attempts to replace his deteriorating body with Edward's. However, Kimblee's soul reappears thwarting him and enabling Edward to enter Pride's body and destroy it. Pride reverts to a small powerless foetus-like form which Edward spares and then he leaves to join his friends.
62	"A Fierce Counterattack"; Transliteration: "Seizetsunaru Hangeki" (Japanese: 凄絶なる反撃)	Takahiro Ikezoe	Hiroshi Ōnogi	Tomokatsu Nagasaku, Jun Shibata & Satoshi Ishino	June 20, 2010	September 11, 2011
Hohenheim and the others prevent Father from making more philosopher's stones. As Edward rejoins them, Father spawns humans resembling the people of Xerxes before attacking with a powerful blast which takes out half of the headquarters. They barely manage to survive the blast, but Alphonse and Hohenheim are heavily damaged protecting the others. Before Father can kill Edward and Izumi, the Briggs Fortress soldiers, along with several of Edward's allies, combine to attack Father and force him to exhaust his stone supply. Father lowers his barrier temporarily to try to absorb Greed's stone, giving Edward, Armstrong, and Izumi the opportunity to attack him to the point of needing to physically defend himself. As Father starts to lose control, he creates a blast which pins Edward's left arm while his automail right arm is destroyed. With Edward in danger, Alphonse convinces May to help him perform a transmutation, trading his soul for the return of Edward's right arm. Alphonse rejoins his body on the other side of the gate and, with his arm returned, Edward fuelled by the loss of his brother frees himself to unleash a series of powerful blows on Father.
63	"The Other Side of the Gateway"; Transliteration: "Tobira no Mukōgawa" (Japanese: 扉の向こう側)	Directed by : Ikurō Satō; Storyboarded by : Yasuhiro Irie	Hiroshi Ōnogi	Hiroki Kanno, Tetsuya Kawakami & Souichirou Sako	June 27, 2010	September 18, 2011
While being pummeled by Edward, Father desperately tries to absorb the philosopher's stone from Greed. However, Greed decides to part from Ling's body to protect Ling's soul, sacrificing himself by using his carbonization ability to turn Father's body into weak charcoal. Father extinguishes Greed's soul, but Edward punches through Father's chest, releasing all the souls of the people of Xerxes and sending Father through the Gate of Truth where he is absorbed and trapped for all eternity. In the wake of Father's defeat, everyone mourns Alphonse's sacrifice. Edward rejects using a philosopher's stone to bring him back to life, even after Hohenheim offers his final life as an apology for the pain suffered by the Elric brothers. Edward ultimately decides to perform a human transmutation on himself, sacrificing his own gate and his ability to ever again use alchemy with it. In return for trading his ability to perform alchemy, Edward is allowed to bring Alphonse back with him in his original body. As everyone recuperates from the battle, Hohenheim returns to Resembool and dies peacefully near Trisha's grave, grateful for having known her and his sons.
64	"Journey's End"; Transliteration: "Tabiji no Hate" (Japanese: 旅路の涯(はて))	Yasuhiro Irie	Hiroshi Ōnogi	See note for the ADs (Note: Hiroki Kanno, Chiyomi Tsukamoto, Koichi Horikawa, Jun Shibata, Satoshi Ishino & Masaru Oshiro)	July 4, 2010	September 25, 2011
While Mustang works towards resolving issues with the Ishvalan people, he is approached by Knox and Marcoh, who offer him a philosopher's stone to recover his eyesight. However, Mustang insists that it be used to restore Havoc's legs first. Meanwhile, Olivier secretly has Scar's wounds treated so that he can assist Miles in rebuilding Ishval. The Elric brothers farewell Ling, who promises to take care of May's clan and the other clans once he becomes emperor, then they return to Resembool where Winry gives them a warm welcome. Meanwhile, Grumman has become Führer and two years later he visits Bradley's wife who had been raising Selim. Selim seems to be a compassionate child although he will continue to be monitored. Alphonse decides to travel with Kimblee's former chimeras, Jerso and Zampano, to Xing and other eastern countries to learn about alkahestry, while Edward learns what he can in the west, hoping to pull their research together. As Edward heads off, he and Winry awkwardly express their love for each other using the terms of equivalent exchange. The last scene shows a photograph of Ed and Winry, now married with two children, accompanied by Alphonse, May, Paninya, and Garfiel.

== OVAs ==
Note: All the original video animations were written by Hiroshi Ōnogi.

No.	Title	Directed by	Animation directed by	Original release date	English release date
1	"The Blind Alchemist"; Transliteration: "Mōmoku no Renkinjutsushi" (Japanese: 盲目の錬金術師)	Directed by : Masaru Yasukawa; Storyboarded by : Hitoshi Nanba	Koichi Horikawa	August 26, 2009	May 22, 2012
Edward and Alphonse visit a blind alchemist named Judou who had supposedly performed a successful human transmutation. Judou is an alchemist employed by the Humbergang family and he tells Edward that the young girl named Rosalie Humbergang playing nearby with Alphonse was resurrected through alchemy. The transmutation cost him his sight in equivalent exchange, however he refuses to reveal to Edward the techniques he used. Rosalie leads Alphonse to a room with a little girl's shrivelled corpse inside. She reveals the corpse is the result of the failed Rosalie transmutation, and that she is an orphan girl named Amy who was adopted because she resembles Rosalie. As Edward arrives on the scene, Lady Humbergang tells him that her late husband kept the truth about the failed transmutation from Judou, who truly wanted to resurrect Rosalie. The Elric brothers then leave, taking this knowledge with them.
2	"Simple People"; Transliteration: "Shinpuru na Hitobito" (Japanese: シンプルな人々)	Directed by : Haruo Sotozaki; Storyboarded by : Yuichiro Yano	Akira Matsushima	December 23, 2009	May 22, 2012
While returning to Resembool to have Edward's automail arm repaired, the Elric brothers buy earrings as souvenirs for Winry to prevent her becoming angry about the broken automail. Later, Edward fights an assassin and his automail is broken again, so he buys earrings for Winry again to avoid her wrath. His offering works again even though he considers it a very simple gift. When asked about her liking for earrings, Winry explains that she decided to pierce her ears after meeting Hawkeye on the day Edward decided to become a state alchemist. Meanwhile, Hawkeye explains to Rebecca that she grew her hair long after meeting Winry. Rebecca comments on how simple a reason that is, and Hawkeye says that reasons are always simple. She remarks that they are all living in a simple world, one where snipers pull the trigger and their enemy dies.
3	"The Tale of Teacher"; Transliteration: "Shishō Monogatari" (Japanese: 師匠物語)	Directed by : Hiroshi Ikehata; Storyboarded by : Nobuo Tomizawa	Toshiyuki Fujisawa	April 21, 2010	May 22, 2012
When Izumi was eighteen years old, she traveled to meet the alchemist Silver Steiner to become his apprentice. She met old man Steiner who only gave her a knife and told her to survive one month on the summit of Briggs before she could become his apprentice. On the second day, cold and starving, she was found by two guards from Briggs Fortress, but she beat them up and took their food rations. On the eighth day, close to starving to death, she became determined to survive. As she learned to defend herself and live off mountain wildlife, she realized the meaning behind the alchemy saying; one is all, and all is one. However, returning after a month, she found that she had been talking to Silver's older brother, Gold Steiner, not an alchemist but a hand-to-hand combat specialist. Annoyed, Izumi beat him up and left, also ending the series of mysterious attacks on Briggs troops. Epilogue: A romanticised look at the first meeting between Izumi and Sig on Briggs Mountain.
4	"Yet Another Man's Battlefield"; Transliteration: "Sore mo Mata Kare no Senjō" (Japanese: それもまた彼の戦場)	Directed by : Ikurō Satō; Storyboarded by : Minoru Ōhara	Takeshi Matsuda	August 25, 2010	May 22, 2012
Eighteen year old Mustang is in a military boot camp and intervenes when a group of seniors bully an Ishvalan recruit named Heathcliff Erbe. Later, Mustang takes a dislike to Maes Hughes who is supposedly friends with the bullies and the two soon become rivals, competing in various training events. Mustang catches the seniors picking on Heathcliff again and gets into a fight with them before Hughes backs him up, having the same beliefs in justice. The three become friends and discuss their reasons for joining the military. Years later, during the Ishvalan war, Mustang the Flame Alchemist encounters Heathcliff fighting for Ishvalan. Hughes kills Heathcliff after he shoots at Mustang. Mustang falls into despair because of what he sees as the indiscriminate slaughter of Ishvalans before being confronted by Hughes, who holds in the pain of his sins so he can smile in front of his future wife Gracia. Upon returning home, Hughes reunites with Gracia while Mustang envies Hughes' strength.

== Home media release ==
=== Japanese ===
Aniplex (Japan – Region 2/A)
Volume	Episodes	Cover character(s)	Release date	Ref.
1	1–2 + OVA 1	Edward Elric	August 26, 2009	
2	3–6	Edward Elric & Alphonse Elric	September 30, 2009	
3	7–10	Roy Mustang & Maes Hughes	October 28, 2009	
4	11–14	Childhood Edward Elric & Alphonse Elric	November 25, 2009	
5	15–18 + OVA 2	Ling Yao, Fu & Lan Fan	December 23, 2009	
6	19–22	Roy Mustang	January 27, 2010	
7	23–26	Edward Elric	February 24, 2010	
8	27–30	Riza Hawkeye	March 24, 2010	
9	31–34 + OVA 3	Olivier Mira Armstrong	April 21, 2010	
10	35–38	Winry Rockbell & Scar	May 26, 2010	
11	39–42	Young adult Van Hohenheim & Homunculus	June 23, 2010	
12	43–46	Edward Elric & Alphonse Elric	July 21, 2010	
13	47–50 + OVA 4	Greed-controlled Ling Yao & Lan Fan	August 25, 2010	
14	51–54	Roy Mustang & Riza Hawkeye	September 22, 2010	
15	55–59	Father, Wrath / King Bradley & Pride / Selim Bradley	October 27, 2010	
16	60–64	Young adult Edward Elric & Alphonse Elric	November 24, 2010	

=== English ===
Crunchyroll LLC (North America – Region 1/A)
Title	Discs	Episodes	Release date	Ref.
Part 1	2	1–13	May 25, 2010	
Part 2	2	14–26	August 24, 2010	
Part 3	2	27–39	December 28, 2010	
Part 4	2	40–52	April 5, 2011	
Part 5	2	53–64	August 2, 2011	
OVA Collection	1 (DVD) + 1 (BD)	4 OVAs	May 22, 2012	
Series Collection 1	5 (DVD); 4 (BD)	1–33	April 24, 2012	
Series Collection 2	5 (DVD); 4 (BD)	34–64	July 17, 2012	
Box Set I	7	1–30	November 20, 2018	
Box Set II	7	31–64	November 20, 2018	
