= Solar eclipses in fiction =

This is a list of fictional stories in which solar eclipses feature as an important plot element. Mere passing mentions are not listed.

== Written works ==
=== Novels ===
- Le Pays des Fourrures (The Fur Country) by Jules Verne (1873). Scientists witness a solar eclipse north of the Arctic Circle in the summer of 1860.
- King Solomon's Mines by Henry Rider Haggard (1885).
- A Connecticut Yankee in King Arthur's Court, by Mark Twain (1889). The protagonist avoids being burned at the stake by predicting a solar eclipse in 528 CE.
- Pharaoh by Bolesław Prus (1895). A historical novel with a solar eclipse c. 1085 BCE (at the fall of Egypt's New Kingdom and 20th Dynasty) predicted by the priest Menes.
- The Secret Mountain by Enid Blyton. A group of children and their guardian, captives of a sun-worshipping African tribe, escape by threatening to kill the Sun, having prior knowledge of an imminent solar eclipse.
- Voyage: A Novel of 1896 by Sterling Hayden (1976). Depicts a solar eclipse of the titular year, viewed from the South Pacific.
- Black Robe by Brian Moore (1985). Jesuit missionaries in 17th century Quebec use their astronomical knowledge of the exact time of an eclipse to prevent their slaughter by Hurons.
- Nightfall by Isaac Asimov and Robert Silverberg (1990). Based on Asimov's 1941 short story of the same name.
- El Eclipse by Augusto Monterroso. Short story in which a Spanish missionary is captured by Mayans and tries to use his knowledge of a solar eclipse to scare them into releasing him. They sacrifice him anyway, already having calculated the infinite dates of upcoming eclipses.
- Gerald's Game and Dolores Claiborne by Stephen King (1992) depict the solar eclipse of July 20, 1963.
- Illegal Alien by Robert J. Sawyer (1997). Aliens visit Earth and observe a total solar eclipse. Their scientist host speculates that Earth may be the only planet in the entire universe whose moon covers its star perfectly (with only transits or occultations occurring on other planets). Although it is not explicitly stated in the novel, Sawyer has noted that the eclipse was the historical eclipse of August 11, 1999, which allows the reader to ascertain the time the novel takes place.
- Eclipse of the Sun by Phil Whitaker (1997). Set in India and has at its center a dramatic attempt to organize a public viewing of the solar eclipse of October 24, 1995.
- Solar Eclipse by John Farris (1999).
- Sunwing by Kenneth Oppel (1999).
- The Eclipse of the Century by Jan Mark (1999).
- Pitch Black: Fight Evil with Evil by Frank Lauria and David Twohy (c. 2000).
- Eclipse (2000) and Shroud (2002) by John Banville. Interlinked novels set against the backdrop of a solar eclipse.
- Eclipse, by Erin Hunter (2008). Part of the Warriors series; the solar eclipse occurs during the battle between the clans, foretold by a strange cat named Sol.
- Midnight Never Come by Marie Brennan (2008).
- The Strain by Guillermo del Toro and Chuck Hogan (2009).
- Every Soul A Star by Wendy Mass (2008).
- A Memory of Light by Robert Jordan and Brandon Sanderson (2013).
- Jade Dragon Mountain by Elsa Hart, (2015). A historical mystery centered around a solar eclipse in early Qing Dynasty China.
- The Eclipse by Willer de Oliveira.
- Trade winds to Meluhha by Vasant Davé (2012). A historical novel where the unique total lunar eclipse and total solar eclipse in Babylon in May 2138 BC set off a young Mesopotamian's adventures in the ancient Indus Valley civilization.

== Films ==
There is a body of films featuring solar eclipses. Compared to other astronomical events featured in films, such as full moons and asteroid strikes, solar eclipses are less commonly seen. When they have featured in films, they often drive the plot and have a portentous presence. NPR's Glen Weldon said that films use eclipses "to signal to audiences that the normal rules have temporarily lifted, and things are about to get weird." The first film to feature a solar eclipse was the 1907 silent film The Eclipse, or the Courtship of the Sun and Moon, which featured a solar eclipse as a fantastical consummation between the Sun and the Moon. Eclipses have been seen as bad omens throughout history and filmmakers leverage that belief "as visual cues or key plot points", according to The Oregonian's Amy Wang. Lisa Yaszek, a professor in the School of Literature, Media, and Communication at Georgia Tech, has remarked that the most accurate depiction of a solar eclipse she has seen in film was in the 1961 religious epic Barabbas, which included film of an actual solar eclipse during a crucifixion scene.

== Television ==
- An episode of the 1980s science fiction comedy/drama The Edison Twins, where the twin siblings foil a bank robbery attempt at a major city bank while employees are focusing on the solar eclipse.
- In the fourth arc of the Sailor Moon manga series by Naoko Takeuchi and the fourth season of its anime adaptation, two eclipses grant power to the group of antagonists known as the Dead Moon Circus.
- Heroes features eclipses prominently within the continuity and symbolism of the show. The title card and logo, for example, both feature an eclipse. An eclipse occurs in the pilot episode, "Genesis", described as a "global event" and commonly understood to be the catalyst that activates the characters' abilities. Another eclipse appears in the first episode of season two, during which Hiro Nakamura teleports to 1671 feudal Japan. The two-part season three episode, "The Eclipse", deals with the consequences of a third eclipse which removes the characters' abilities as well as the unknown connection between eclipses and evolved humans.
- The Recess episode "Outcast Ashley" partly revolves around Gretchen's attempts to view the solar eclipse occurring that afternoon, and with whom she views it.
- In one of his cartoons, Bugs Bunny accidentally travels through time to the Middle Ages. While there, he tricks everyone into believing that he has put out the Sun with a spell. This was a parody of and homage to Mark Twain's novel, A Connecticut Yankee in King Arthur's Court.
- In an episode of Darkwing Duck, the titular character accidentally travels to the Middle Ages and is about to be executed as a warlock when he remembers that his execution is timed exactly with an eclipse. He threatens to black out the Sun unless released and begins to speak gibberish, pretending to put a spell on the Sun. However, he has misread the date of the solar eclipse by one day and stands on the gallows for 24 hours until the eclipse happens.
- In the 1993 first season of Mighty Morphin Power Rangers, the evil witch Rita Repulsa causes a solar eclipse to drain the Megazord's power in the five-part episode "Green With Evil".
- Sineskwela has an episode about solar and lunar eclipses.
- The opening credits of Star Trek: Voyager (1995–2001) feature a CGI-generated solar eclipse.
- The 2001 TNT miniseries The Mists of Avalon features a solar eclipse during the death of Viviane, suggesting the Mother Goddess' grief at the event.
- In the 2001-2004 Samurai Jack animated series, Aku is able to escape the tree he is sealed in due to an eclipse.
- In Heroes, on October 1, 2006, a solar eclipse is observed by several strangers around the world, with similar eclipses occurring in 1671, 2007, and on June 13, 2014. The eclipse has an effect on people's abilities.
- In the 2007 Avatar: the Last Airbender episode "The Day of Black Sun", Aang and his allies plan for the day of the invasion of the Fire Nation capital on the day a solar eclipse would occur, leaving the firebenders without firebending for about eight minutes. The plan was expected to end the war, but fails because Azula, the princess of the Fire Nation, learns of the upcoming invasion beforehand. It is later revealed in "Sozin's Comet" that, at the same time, King Bumi took advantage of the eclipse and single-handedly reclaimed Omashu, forcing the occupying Fire Nation to flee.
- The 2007 Sci-Fi channel miniseries Tin Man is centered on a "double eclipse" which will give power to one of the two princesses of the O.Z.
- The CSI: Miami episode "Sunblock" features a murder in which the killer struck during a solar eclipse due to an allergy to sunlight.
- The Cold Case episode "The Key" centers around the murder of a wife and mother who is killed during a solar eclipse, which is the last thing she saw before she died.
- In the episode "Gone Maggie Gone" (2009) of The Simpsons, a solar eclipse occurs which causes Marge Simpson to go temporarily blind.
- The final two episodes of Berserk, "The Great Eclipse" and "Time of Eternity", take place during a solar eclipse, which in the series universe happens only once every 216 years and marks the birth of a new member of the Godhand. During these episodes, Griffith, once the leader of the Band of the Hawk, betrays and sacrifices his men in order to become the fifth member of the Godhand, Femto.
- The Mad Men episode "Seven Twenty Three" features the solar eclipse that occurred in July 1963.
- In the final three episodes of Raven the Island, an eclipse allows the warriors to enter Nevar's fortress.
- In the finale of the first season of DuckTales "The Shadow War!", an eclipse allows Magica De Spell to escape from Scrooge's Number One Dime and regain her magical powers.
- In the third season of House of Anubis, a ceremony to reawaken someone cursed by Anubis to sleep for eternity can only be performed during a total solar eclipse. Robert Frobisher-Smythe, who is central to the series' backstory, has been cursed by Anubis in this manner. As an eclipse approaches, an attempt is made to reawaken Robert. However, one of the people who performs the ceremony, Caroline Denby, is impure of heart, which causes Robert to become evil.
- In Episode 61, "He Who Would Swallow God", of the anime series Fullmetal Alchemist: Brotherhood, empowered stone fragments are activated by the eclipse's umbra.
- In the sixth season of The Vampire Diaries, from episode 2, "Yellow Ledbetter", to episode 15, "Let Her Go", an eclipse is present in the missing dimension in 1994 where Damon and Bonnie are trapped, with Damon eventually managing to escape and return home.
- In the season two finale of The Owl House, "King's Tide", the draining spell for the Day of Unity is activated via a solar eclipse. The spell fails after the Collector ends the eclipse.
- An episode of the Australian soap opera Neighbours first broadcast on 20 May 2013 featured a storyline revolving around the annular solar eclipse that had been witnessed in Australia ten days earlier.

=== Comic books ===
- Tintin: Prisoners of the Sun by Hergé (1948). Tintin and his friends escape certain death by deceiving the Incas with a solar eclipse.

== Other ==
- Album covers showing a solar eclipse include:
  - The 1972 Tangerine Dream album, Zeit
  - The 2000 Kitaro album Ancient
- In the "Prologue" to Borodin's opera Prince Igor (left unfinished at his death in 1887, completed by Nikolai Rimsky-Korsakov and Alexander Glazunov, and first performed in 1890) a solar eclipse takes place to general consternation, causing two soldiers, Skula and Yeroshka, to desert Prince Igor.
- Prisoners of the Sun (The Adventures of Tintin comic album by Hergé). Tintin uses a prediction of a solar eclipse to gain favor with the Quechua people who are about to kill him.
- The PlayStation 3 and Xbox 360 game The Darkness includes a solar eclipse in the final chapter.
- The PlayStation game Heart of Darkness features a solar eclipse when Andy and his dog, Whiskey, are walking in the park.
- In the game Castlevania: Aria of Sorrow, the story begins with a total solar eclipse in the year 2035, with a solar eclipse having been used to seal away Dracula's castle.
- The game Terraria features a solar eclipse as a rare event that causes monsters inspired by popular horror fiction and films to attack the player.
- In Call of Duty: World at War and Call of Duty: Black Ops III, the Zombies maps Der Riese and The Giant feature a solar eclipse.
- The Japanese visual novels Zero Escape: Virtue's Last Reward and 12Riven: the Psi-climinal of Integral both use a solar eclipse as an important plot element.
- The Japanese Berserk manga features an eclipse as one of the main events of the plot, the details of which drive the protagonist, Guts, to pursue revenge.
- Love and Rockets features a solar eclipse in Palomar at the beginning of Gilbert Hernandez's "Heartbreak Soup", during which fraternal twins Israel and Aurora are playing and Aurora disappears. This affects the storyline of not only Gilbert's stories going forward, but sheds light on a major character in Jaime Hernandez's work as well.
- In the comic series Batman: The Return of Bruce Wayne, eclipses play an important role, as it is usually during those events that Bruce Wayne jumps through time.
- The musical piece Night in the Afternoon was written by Hendrik Meurkens for Vera Donovan's solar-eclipse-viewing garden party scene in the 1995 film Dolores Claiborne.
- In the 2021 video game The Dark Pictures Anthology: House of Ashes, a solar eclipse occurs during the main characters' escape from the temple, allowing the alien vampires to emerge from their shelter and forcing the characters to withstand their attack until the eclipse ends.
- In the 2022 video game Xenoblade Chronicles 3, a solar eclipse occurs as Mio's Homecoming is taking place.
- In the 2016 video game Dark Souls III, a solar eclipse is featured during the final boss "Soul of Cinder".
- In 2024, dark metal band Axioma recorded a live performance and video during the total solar eclipse on the shores of Lake Erie in Lorain, Ohio.
- In the 2026 video game Saros, solar eclipses are a central gameplay and plot element that do not follow a pattern and can cause madness if observed for too long.
