= Scorching Ping Pong Girls =

Japanese manga and anime series

- First tankōbon volume cover

灼熱の卓球娘 (Shakunetsu no Takkyū Musume)
- Genre: Sports
- Manga
- Written by: Yagura Asano
- Published by: Shueisha
- Magazine: Jump SQ.19 (December 19, 2013 – February 19, 2015); Tonari no Young Jump (May 15, 2015 – February 1, 2019)
- Original run: December 19, 2013 – February 1, 2019
- Volumes: 7
- Anime television series
- Directed by: Yasuhiro Irie
- Produced by: Hiroyuki Tanaka; Shoichi Hotta; Yoshikazu Beniya; Taro Iwahana; Mika Shimizu; Jun Fukuda; Takaya Ibira; Shunsuke Matsumura; Takeshi Ishigaki
- Written by: Hideyuki Kurata
- Music by: Monaca: Keiichi Hirokawa; Kuniyuki Takahashi; Hidekazu Tanaka
- Studio: Kinema Citrus
- Licensed by: NA: Crunchyroll
- Original network: TV Tokyo, AT-X, BS Japan
- Original run: October 3, 2016 – December 19, 2016
- Episodes: 12
- Manga

Scorching Ping Pong Girls Reburn!!
- Written by: Yagura Asano
- Published by: Takeshobo
- Magazine: Storia Dash
- Original run: April 28, 2023 – present
- Volumes: 3

Scorching Ping Pong Girls (灼熱の卓球娘, Shakunetsu no Takkyū Musume) is a Japanese manga series by Yagura Asano about table tennis. The original run began serialization in Shueisha's shōnen manga magazine Jump SQ.19 in 2013. After Jump SQ.19 ended publication in February 2015, the manga moved to Shueisha's online platform Tonari no Young Jump in May 2015, and finished in February 2019. It has been collected in seven tankōbon volumes. A continuation, titled Scorching Ping Pong Girls Reburn!!, began serialization on Takeshobo's Storia Dash website from April 2023. An anime television series adaptation by Kinema Citrus aired in Japan between October and December 2016.

== Characters ==
=== Suzumegahara Municipal Junior High ===
Koyori Tsumujikaze (旋風 こより, Tsumujikaze Koyori)
Voiced by: Yumiri Hanamori
A shy transfer student who joins Suzumegahara's table tennis club. She loves table tennis and was a prefectural semifinalist in her previous school.
Agari Kamiya (上矢 あがり, Kamiya Agari)
Voiced by: Minami Tanaka
A second year in the table tennis club and the ace prior to Koyori joining the club.
Hanabi Tenka (天下 ハナビ, Tenka Hanabi)
Voiced by: Marika Kōno
A second year table tennis club member who is classmates with Koyori and Agari. She is an energetic girl who possesses an offensive playstyle involving fast returns.
Hokuto Itsumo (出雲 ほくと, Izumo Hokuto)
Voiced by: Yūki Kuwahara
A second year table tennis club member who is friends with Hanabi. She generally uses a calculative playstyle, allowing her to manipulate how her opponents hit the ball, and can guess what type of underwear someone is wearing from their paddle. Her family runs a table tennis specialist store.
Mune Ōmune (大宗 夢音, Ōmune Mune)
Voiced by: Ayaka Imamura
A third year and the vice-captain of the table tennis club. Nicknamed Munemune (ムネムネ) due to her ample breasts.
Kiruka Ushirode (後手 キルカ, Ushirode Kiruka)
Voiced by: Hisako Tōjō
A third year and the captain of the table tennis club. She generally uses a playstyle that involves a backspin chop that forces her opponent to make errors when returning shots, and enjoys imposing penalties on her clubmates during practice.

=== Mozuyama Junior High ===
Kururi Futamaru (二重丸 くるり, Futamaru Kururi)
Voiced by: Shiori Izawa
A third year and the vice-captain of the table tennis club. She's the ace of the club, and along with Zakuro, lead their team to the Nationals. She has a pension for using the word "death" when speaking, and has a crush on Zakuro. She uses a playstyle that involves a curve drive that forces her opponents to return shots that miss the table and turn to the left.
Zakuro Zashikiwarashi (座敷童 石榴, Zashikiwarashi Zakuro)
Voiced by: Nozomi Furuki
A third year and captain of the table tennis club. She started playing after witnessing Kururi defeating all of the seniors in their team and became inspired to play like her. She has a tendency to be clumsy and act like a klutz when speaking.
Sachiko Sasorida (蠍田 幸子, Sasorida Sachiko)
Voiced by: Rika Tachibana
A second year table tennis club member who sees herself as the future captain but feel underappreciated by her teammates. She uses an off-rhythm playstyle that throws her opponents off from their usual playstyle.
Yura Yuragi (由良木 ゆら, Yuragi Yura)
Voiced by: Yoshino Aoyama
A second year table tennis club member who's nicknamed Pendulum (振り子), due to her playstyle of forcing her opponents into rallies that drain their stamina and predicting what shots they'll deliver.
Mayuu Kanenashi (鐘梨 まゆう, Kanenashi Mayū)
Voiced by: Ayumi Takeo
A second year table tennis club member who is friends with Kimiko.
Kimiko Hamu (羽無 公子, Hamu Kimiko)
Voiced by: Yuka Ōtsubo
A second year table tennis club member who is friends with Kanenashi. Nicknamed Nom-Nom (名ノミ) due to her constant chowing down of food in her mouth.

=== Tsumebame Girl's Academy ===
Kumami Tsukinowa (月ノ輪 紅真深, Tsukinowa Kumami)
Voiced by: Reina Ueda
A second year who was formerly part of Suzemegahara's table tennis club, before transferring to Tsumebame after being enticed by their captain. On the day she left, Agari asked her to play one match with her before leaving but refused. She has a talent for ventriloquism that involves talking with her hairpin she calls Kumanosuke.

== Media ==
=== Manga ===
Scorching Ping Pong Girls, written and illustrated by Yagura Asano, began its serialization in Shueisha's Jump SQ.19 on December 19, 2013. After Jump SQ.19 ceased its publication on February 19, 2015, the series was switched to the Tonari no Young Jump online platform starting on May 15, 2015. The original run ended on February 1, 2019. Shueisha compiled its chapters into seven tankōbon volumes, published between March 4, 2015, and April 4, 2016. On February 24, 2023, a one-shot manga titled Scorching Idol Girls (灼熱のアイドル娘, Shakunetsu no Aidoru Musume) was released on Takeshobo's Storia website, which announced that the original manga would be returning for a second season titled Scorching Ping Pong Girls Reburn!!, which began serialization from April 28, 2023.

==== Volume list ====
No.	Japanese release date	Japanese ISBN
1	March 4, 2015	978-4-08-880204-6
2	March 4, 2015	978-4-08-880257-2
3	April 4, 2016	978-4-08-880708-9
4	October 4, 2016	978-4-08-880796-6
5	December 2, 2016	978-4-08-880832-1
6	December 4, 2017	978-4-08-881430-8
7	March 4, 2019	978-4-08-881704-0

==== Scorching Ping Pong Girls: REBURN ====
No.	Japanese release date	Japanese ISBN
1	February 17, 2024	978-4-80-198234-5
2	February 17, 2024	978-4-80-198235-2
3	December 17, 2024	978-4-80-198505-6

=== Anime ===
An anime television adaptation of the series was announced in March 2016. The anime is produced by Kinema Citrus, directed by Yasuhiro Irie and written by Hideyuki Kurata, featuring character designs by Junko Sugimura and music by MONACA. The series aired on TV Tokyo between October 3, 2016, and December 19, 2016 and was simulcast by Crunchyroll. The opening theme is "Shakunetsu Switch" (灼熱スイッチ, Shakunetsu Suicchi; lit. "Scorching Switch) by Suzumegahara Chūgaku Takkyū-bu (Yumiri Hanamori, Minami Tanaka, Marika Kōno, Yūki Kuwahara, Ayaka Imamura, and Hisako Tōjō), while the ending theme is "Bokura no Frontier" (僕らのフロンティア, Bokura no Furontia; lit "Our Frontier") by Wake Up, Girls!. The anime will be released across six Blu-ray & DVD volumes.

==== Episode list ====
No.	Title (Note: All English episode titles are taken from Crunchyroll.)	Original release date
1	"...My Heart's About to Burst!" "...Dokidoki suru!" (…ドキドキするっ！)	October 3, 2016
The Oudou Academy table tennis team, who had been champions for nine straight years, are suddenly defeated by the unknown Hayabusa Academy. Meanwhile, at Suzumegahara Municipal Junior High School, Agari Kamiya, the school's top player, comes across a shy transfer student named Koyori Tsumujikaze, who shows an interest in joining the table tennis club. Having a practise match against her, Agari is surprised by how skilled Koyori seems to be. While Agari goes off to do an interview, Koyori plays against the other club members, quickly rising up the club's ranking after beating ten first-year members in a row. Koyori's reputation among the club increases further after she manages to beat the club's fourth ranked member, Mune Ōmune. As Koyori is revealed to have been a prefectural semifinalist in her previous school, Agari becomes anxious that her position as the club's ace will be taken from her.
2	"Unrelinquishable Spot" "Yuzurenai Basho" (譲れない場所)	October 10, 2016
Having moved up to fourth place after beating Mune, Koyori faces off against the third ranked member, Hokuto Itsumo. Hokuto gains an advantage due to her ability to force her opponent to hit the way she wants, but Koyori soon fights back, bringing Hokuto out of her calculative playstyle into a fierce rally and managing to win. The next day, as Koyori manages to win against the second ranked member, Hanabi Tenka, Agari becomes further downhearted when the other members start declaring Koyori their new ace. Determined to protect her top spot, Agari challenges Koyori to a match the next day.
3	"Love It!!" "Suki!!" (好きっ!!)	October 17, 2016
As the match begins, Agari uses her loop drive technique to gain an early lead against Koyori. However, Koyuri becomes excited and starts countering Koyori's backhand smashes, expressing her love for table tennis. Upon feeling a heart-pounding sensation herself, Agari regains the feeling of fun she used to have for table tennis before becoming obsessed with victory and praise, bringing out the forehand smashes she previously discarded. Despite losing the match in the end, Agari feels happy about the match and becomes friends with Koyori. Meanwhile, Mune reports the day's events to the club president, who prepares to return to the club following a foot injury.
4	"Boring Table Tennis" "Taikutsu na Takkyū" (タイクツな卓球)	October 24, 2016
President Kiruka Ushirode returns to the club and challenges all the other members to beat her for a spot in their team roster. As Kiruka beats almost all of the members with her backspin chop, Agari, annoyed by Kiruka's passive impression of everyone, states her determination to reach the nationals and steps up to face her.
5	"I Want to Feel My Heart Race With You" "Anata to Dokidoki Shitaikara" (あなたとドキドキしたいから)	October 31, 2016
Agari begins her match with Kiruka, initially struggling against her seemingly impregnable wall of defense. However, Agari manages to bring out her forehand smash, which she had been practising since her match against Koyori, managing to score against Kiruka and earn a spot on the team roster. Feeling that she can experience more heart-pounding excitement if she goes to the Nationals, Koyuri steps up to face Kiruka, who also feels excitement from her match, and also manages to win a spot on the roster alongside Agari and the other top ranked players. Afterwards, as Agari points out that Kiruka wasn't even using her full strength and can shine further in doubles matches, Kiruka sets up a practice against Mozuyama Junior High.
6	"Friends" "Tomodachi" (ともだち)	November 7, 2016
Noticing that the rubber on Koyori's paddle has worn off, affecting her play, Hokuto suggests that she buy some replacements, only to find she has no allowance. To this end, Koyori starts working part-time at Hokuto's family table tennis store alongside Hanabi in order to earn money for new rubbers. While trying to work up the courage to deal with customers, Koyori ends up serving a rather peculiar customer. As Koyori gets used to her job by the time Agari and the others come to check up on her, Hokuto recalls how she became friends with Hanabi.
7	"National Caliber" "Zenkoku-kō no Jitsuryoku" (全国校の実力)	November 14, 2016
As a reward for her work, Hokuto picks out a springy rubber for Koyori that helps her enjoy table tennis more. The girls soon arrive at Mozuyama Junior High for their practise match, where Koyori comes across the girl she met before, Kururi Futamaru, who helped lead her team to the nationals. Stating that she plays for the sake of her team captain, Zakuro Zashikiwarashi, Kururi leaves Koyori questioning why she herself plays table tennis. As the practise match gets underway, Hanabi goes up against Sachiko Sasorida, winning the first two games against her only for Sachiko to make a comeback with her off-rhythm plays, taking advantage of Hanabi's lack of stamina to win the match. Next, Hokuto goes up against Yura Yuragi, who gains an early lead.
8	"Doubles" "Daburusu" (ダブルス)	November 21, 2016
Hokuto is brought to the point of exhaustion by Yura's extended rallies, ultimately losing against her despite a strong comeback. Responding to Agari's desire to win, Mune and Kiruka step up to face Mayuu Kanenashi and Kimiko Hamu in a doubles match. As the match goes on, Kiruka notices that Mune is holding herself back out of concern for her ankle. Remembering how they make up for each other's weaknesses, Mune and Kiruka bring out their all and win their match, setting the stage for Agari to battle against Zakuro.
9	"Never Reach Me" "Watashi ni wa Todokanai" (私には届かない)	November 28, 2016
As Agari begins her match against Zakuro, who gets an early lead, Kururi recalls how she first joined Mozuyama's table tennis club two years ago. Despite being asked to train everyone for the Nationals, Kururi's fearsome playstyle ended up turning almost everyone away from the club with the exception of Zakuro, who continued to stand by her. As Agari struggles to get the lead over Zakuro with her forehand smashes, she focuses on her desire to give Koyori the opportunity to play and brings out her backhand smashes to get back on equal ground. Switching up her smashes during the final set, Agari manages to win the match, reminding Koyori of the reason why she plays table tennis; to make the hearts of both her and her opponent pound. The final match between Koyori and Kururi then begins, with Kururi bringing out her fearsome curve drive.
10	"My Brand of Table Tennis" "Watashi no Takkyū" (わたしの卓球)	December 5, 2016
Koyori continues to struggle against Kururi's curve drives, which keeps causing the balls to swerve off the table. Despite falling behind two games, Koyori remains excited and determined to make Kururi feel the same excitement. Recalling her practise with Agari, Koyori finally manages to find the sweet spot of her paddle, allowing her to return Kururi's curve drives. Having developed her curve drive with Zakuro, Kururi starts to become more hesitant, allowing Koyori to catch up to her. Noticing Kururi's worries, Zakuro encourages her to fight with her own brand of table tennis, leading Kururi to follow Koyori's example and find the sweet spot of her curve drive. As Kururi lets her heart race to bring out her most powerful curve drive yet, Koyori responds in earnest and hits it back, winning the match and the contest. Despite her loss, Kururi finds that Zakuro and the others still care for her regardless of winning or losing, giving her thanks to Koyori for a heart-pounding match.
11	"Training Camp" "Gasshuku" (合宿)	December 12, 2016
While setting off for a training camp, the girls come across Kumami Tsukinowa, a former teammate who appears to have a history with Agari. As the camp gets underway, Agari, who is worried about her skills after narrowly beating Zakuro, struggles with hitting lethal smashes. The girls also notice that Agari is concerned over Kumami, who refused to play against her when she transferred to Tsumebame Girl's Academy. Encouraged by her friends to do everything she can before facing Tsumebame in the national qualifiers, Agari aims to improve her smashes.
12	"Together, We Can Go As Far As We Want" "Futari de Nara Dokodemo demo" (ふたりでならどこでもでも)	December 19, 2016
As the girls begin to work on their individual weaknesses, Koyori decides to take unconventional measures to help Agari improve her forehand smashes. Meanwhile, Mune feels left out as Kiruka spends more time teaching the other students instead of focusing on their doubles practise, but is reassured by Kiruka's desire to help her underclassmen. On the final day of the training camp, Agari and Koyori spend some time teaching some of their underclassmen, which soon attracts attention and turns into a late night tournament. The tournament soon culminates in a match between Agari and Koyori, where Agari manages to perfect her forehand smash. With their determination and love of table tennis strengthened, the team set their sights on the Nationals.

== Reception ==
Anime News Network had four editors review the first episode of the anime: Theron Martin said that despite the bland production, workmanlike animation and typical moe designs, he commended the show's writing for its charming humor and moe elements, and leaving enough room for character development between its two main leads; Nick Creamer was initially unimpressed by the show's aesthetics in the opening scenes and described it as "meaningless club activities plus clumsy fanservice", but was hooked by the conflict between Agari and Koyori's differing viewpoints on playing table tennis and its adequate delivery of a sports narrative; Paul Jensen found the series conflicted with its jumbling of both school comedy and sports elements and preferred that it went with the latter genre to focus on both table tennis and the Agari-Koyori relationship. The fourth reviewer, Rebecca Silverman, criticized the art direction and character designs for being generic and annoyingly simplistic, and the animation of the ping pong scenes for lacking excitement for the viewers. Silverman added that the series has potential by putting its focus more on both the explanation of ping pong and Agari's conundrum of wanting to excel at the sport while wanting to have friends, concluding with, "So right now this episode stands with as a big question – will it learn to balance its elements? Will the sports drama win out, or will the moe? I'm not sure it's worth finding out."
