= Eden (2021 TV series) =

Anime streaming television series

- Promotional poster
- Genre: Adventure; Science fiction
- Created by: Justin Leach
- Manga
- Illustrated by: Tsuyoshi Isomoto
- Published by: Shōnen Gahōsha
- Magazine: Young King Ours GH
- Original run: February 16, 2021 – February 16, 2022
- Volumes: 2
- Original net animation
- Directed by: Yasuhiro Irie
- Written by: Kimiko Ueno
- Music by: Kevin Penkin
- Studio: Qubic Pictures; CGCG Studio Inc.
- Licensed by: Netflix
- Released: May 27, 2021
- Runtime: 25 minutes
- Episodes: 4

Eden is a CGI anime television series produced by CGCG Studio Inc. and Qubic Pictures. Directed by Yasuhiro Irie and written by Kimiko Ueno, it was released on May 27, 2021, on Netflix.

== Plot ==
A thousand years after humans disappeared from Earth, a gleaming monolithic city known as "Eden 3" is inhabited solely by artificially intelligent robots whose former masters vanished long ago although they continue to grow agricultural produce. Their ruler, a robotic dark lord known as Zero, wants to destroy the humankind. On a routine assignment on the surrounding farmland two maintenance robots accidentally awaken a human baby girl, Sara Grace, from stasis, questioning their belief that humans were a forbidden ancient myth. Together, the two robots secretly raise Sara in a safe haven outside Eden 3.

== Voice cast ==
Character	Japanese voice	English voice
Sara Grace (サラグレース, Sara Gurēsu)	Marika Kouno	Ruby Rose Turner
A37/Mom	Kyōko Hikami	Rosario Dawson
E92/Dad	Kentarō Itō	David Tennant
Zero/Dr. Weston Fields (ゼロ)	Kōichi Yamadera	Neil Patrick Harris
S566/Uncle John	Tarusuke Shingaki	J. P. Karliak
Zurich (チューリヒ, Chūrihi)	Yūki Kuwahara	Cassandra Lee Morris
Geneva (ジュネーブ, Junēbu)	Yūko Kaida	Julie Nathanson

== Production ==
First announced in April 2019, the series was originally given a late 2020 release window. However, at the Netflix Anime Festival in October 2020, it was revealed that it would be delayed to May 2021.

Yasuhiro Irie serves as director, with Kimiko Ueno handling the scripts. Kevin Penkin serves as the series' composer.

== Episodes ==
No.	Title	Directed by	Written by	Original release date
1	"Episode 1"	Yasuhiro Irie	Kimiko Ueno	May 27, 2021
Two agricultural robots, A37 and E92 find a cryogenic capsule containing a human child named Sara Grace. They realize it is their duty to report the find to avoid being reprogrammed but delay reporting her while they feed the hungry Sara on apples grown on their factory farm, Eden 3. The two robots are undecided on whether to report Sara and go to talk with dissident robots who meet secretly. They arrive to see the dissidents being captured and punished, although one manages to transmit some coordinates. A37 and E92 take Sara to coordinate location and encounter a group of robots, led by the robot John, who believe that humans created robots and therefore cannot assimilate with Eden. Some years pass and when Sara is a teenager, E92 explains that she must remain isolated as most robots believe that humans are evil and must be destroyed. One day while exploring, she finds an abandoned BattleMech, but when she activates it, her voice is detected in Eden.
2	"Episode 2"	Yasuhiro Irie	Kimiko Ueno	May 27, 2021
While out alone, Sara encounters recon drones and quickly returns to base, but John and the others are concerned that they may still be discovered. Later, the dissident robots are fascinated by a movie retrieved by Sara which shows humans dancing. A flashback shows Dr. Weston Fields despairing of the destruction of the planet by humans to the point where it is becoming uninhabitable, and planning for a future where robots will support human life and his daughter, Liz, showing him things a dog-like robot, Emily, brought her, including apple blossoms and seeds. Sara insists in travelling to Eden 3 to investigate the voice she heard and takes the small robot PJ3 with her while the others hide traces of her presence at the base. Sara enters Eden 3 searching for the other human, and discovers Zurich, the AI system which controls Eden One. Zurich asks Sara to help the 34,998 humans still held in cryogenic sleep, since two have already been awakened. Sara must find the password to awaken the people before their life support systems reach their time limit.
3	"Episode 3"	Yasuhiro Irie	Kimiko Ueno	May 27, 2021
During an incursion into Eden 3, Sara discovers that another human also emerged from a pod, Dr. Weston Fields, and that a password is required to awaken other humans from stasis. She escapes capture by Zero and the security robots with the aid of Zurich. Later, Sara follows a small dog-like robot, who is Emily from the flashback in Episode 2, carrying an apple to an abandoned house in the ruins of Eden Zero. There the robot displays a message by Dr. Fields, but it was recorded 400 years earlier. Sara, along with A37, E92 and other dissenting robots are found and captured by Lord Zero, and A37 and E92 are reprogrammed. In a fit of anger, Sara attacks and disables the security robots much to her own surprise. However Lord Zero grabs Sara and attempts to eliminate her, but she is saved by the intervention of John and she escapes. She returns to Fields' cottage where Emily shows the final message from Fields before his consciousness is transferred to the robot Zero. He had lost faith in humans and believed that they are an impediment to creating the perfect world.
4	"Episode 4"	Yasuhiro Irie	Kimiko Ueno	May 27, 2021
A flashback shows Dr. Fields preparing the cryogenic pods for those selected to live into the future and his plans for the construction of Eden which will be completely managed by robots. However, his young daughter Liz succumbs to her illness before the plan is implemented. Back in the present, Zurich tell Sara that she must find the password to unlock the cryogenic pods within 24 hours to save the humans. However, Sara wonders whether she should unleash humans onto the planet again. Lord Zero takes control of the Demolition Robot in an effort to find Sara and destroy the robots helping her. Sara asks Zurich to activate the BattleMech she found earlier and takes control of it to stop the Demolition Robot. During the battle between the BattleMechs, Sara uses a plan to get the password by making Zurich say words Liz has said before, which awakens Dr. Fields' memories and he sacrifices himself to save Sara and gives her the password. Sara then activates the revival process for the pods and begins a new chapter in human and robot history. In a mid-credits scene, Dr. Fields' neural network has been revealed to be transferred to Emily's body. Geneva, Zurich's successor and Lord Zero's former assistant and Zurich say that they will get his original body ready so Fields' neural network can be transferred to it, but Fields states that they don't have to.

== Media ==
=== Manga ===
A manga adaptation illustrated by Tsuyoshi Isomoto was serialized in Shōnen Gahōsha's Young King Ours GH magazine from February 16, 2021, to February 16, 2022.

== Reception ==
The Encyclopedia of Science Fiction described Eden as an enjoyable anime with very good animation and an engaging story, but criticized its excessively compressed narrative. It argued that the four-episode format was insufficient for the amount of plot presented, resulting in rushed storytelling and underdeveloped characters and worldbuilding. The encyclopedia also criticized the series' reliance on familiar narrative conventions, particularly its predictable use of a child's illness to establish a tragic backstory. Despite these shortcomings, it praised the animation and the generally agreeable progression of the story, concluding that the series could have been considerably more impressive had it been given more time to develop its ideas.
