= Yasuhiro Irie =

Japanese animator

- Born: March 30, 1971 (age 55)
- Occupations: Animator, character designer, anime director
- Known for: Directing acclaimed series such as Fullmetal Alchemist: Brotherhood

Yasuhiro Irie (入江 泰浩, Irie Yasuhiro; born March 30, 1971) is a Japanese animator, character designer and anime director.

== Biography ==
Beginning his career at Sunrise, Irie worked as an animation director and animator on several productions before transitioning into directing. He made his directorial debut with volumes 2–4 of Alien 9 and the 2004 television series Kurau Phantom Memory. He later directed Fullmetal Alchemist: Brotherhood, a series noted for its storytelling and animation quality.

Irie has worked on series such as Vision of Escaflowne, Cowboy Bebop, and RahXephon. He is also a member of the Japan Animation Creators Association (JAniCA).

== Works ==
=== Anime television series ===
- Mama wa Shōgaku 4 Nensei (1992; key animation)
- Genki Bakuhatsu Ganbaruger (1992; key animation)
- Nekketsu Saikyō Go-Saurer (1993; key animation)
- Vision of Escaflowne (1994–1996; animation director, animation assistance, key animation)
- Mobile Fighter G Gundam (1994; key animation)
- Revolutionary Girl Utena (1997; key animation)
- Cowboy Bebop (1998; key animation)
- Bakusō Kyōdai Let's & Go!! MAX (1998; key animation)
- Uchū Kaizoku Mito no Daibōken (1999; key animation)
- Sorcerous Stabber Orphen (1998–1999; key animation)
- RahXephon (2002; episode director, animation director, key animation)
- Fullmetal Alchemist (2003–2004; OP animation director)
- Gunparade March (2003; character design, character animation director, storyboards, episode direction, key animation)
- Kurau Phantom Memory (2004; director, screenplay, storyboards, episode direction)
- Gaiking: Legend of Daiku-Maryu (2005–2006; key animation)
- Soul Eater (2008–2009; OP storyboards, episode direction, key animation)
- Nogizaka Haruka no Himitsu (2008; storyboards, episode direction, animation director, key animation)
- Fullmetal Alchemist: Brotherhood (2009–10; director)
- Code:Breaker (2012; director)
- Scorching Ping Pong Girls (2016; director)
- Healer Girl (2022; director)
- Housing Complex C (2022; OP storyboards)
- Oshi no Ko (2023–2026; storyboards, episode direction)
- Saint Cecilia and Pastor Lawrence (2023; OP storyboards)

=== Animated films ===
- Spriggan (1998; key animation)
- Escaflowne (2000; original picture animation director)
- Digimon Adventure: Our War Game! (2000; key animation)
- Cowboy Bebop: Knockin' on Heaven's Door (2001; storyboard assistance)
- Fullmetal Alchemist: Conqueror of Shamballa (2005; key animation)
- Tekkon Kinkreet (2006; key animation)

=== ONA ===
- Eden (2021; director)

=== OVA ===
- Moldiver (1993; key animation)
- Giant Robo: The Animation Chikyū ga Seishi Suru hi (1992–1998; key animation)
- Yōsei Kisuikoden (1993; key animation)
- Fire Emblem: Monshō no Nazo (1996; key animation)
- JoJo's Bizarre Bizarre Adventure's third chapter: "D'Arby The Gambler" (1994; key animation)
- Macross Plus episode 3 (1995; key animation)
- Mobile Suit Gundam: The 08th MS Team (1996–1999; key animation)
- Alien Nine (2001–2002; character design, animation director, director, Vol. 2–Vol. 4)

=== Games ===
- Exodus Guilty (1998; key animation)
- NOeL 3 (1998; animation director)
