= Lil'B (group) =

Japanese female pop duo

- Origin: Japan
- Genres: J-pop, R&B
- Years active: 2007–present
- Labels: DefStar Records (2008-present)
- Members: Mie (singing); Aila (rapping)
- Website: www.lilb.jp

Lil'B is a Japanese female pop duo, consisting of singer Mie and rapper Aila. They debuted in 2008 with "Orange," the 15th ending theme song for the anime Bleach. They are best known for their song "Kimi ni Utatta Love Song," which topped the RIAJ's monthly ringtone chart in 2008. They are also well known for their single "Tsunaida Te", which was the 3rd ending theme song for the anime Fullmetal Alchemist: Brotherhood.

The group's stage name comes from a contraction of the word little, and the first letter of the word betray.

== Discography ==
=== Albums ===
Year	Album Information	Oricon Albums Charts	Reported sales
2009	Ima, Kimi e... (今、キミへ…, Now, to You...): Released: February 11, 2009; Label: DefStar Records (DFCL-1553); Formats: CD, digital download; Certified gold by the RIAJ	2	115,000
2009	One: Released: December 9, 2009; Label: DefStar Records (DFCL-1614); Formats: CD, digital download	5	48,000

=== Singles ===
Release	Title	Chart positions			Oricon sales	Digital certifications	Album
Release	Title	Oricon Singles Charts	Billboard Japan Hot 100	RIAJ digital tracks	Oricon sales	Digital certifications	Album
2008	"Orange" (オレンジ, Orenji)	28	23	54*	7,500	Chaku-uta Full Gold	Ima, Kimi e...
2008	"Kimi ni Utatta Love Song" (キミに歌ったラブソング, A Love Song Sung for You)	8	5	1*	27,000	Chaku-uta Triple Platinum; Chaku-uta Full Double Platinum	Ima, Kimi e...
2008	"Negaigoto Hitotsu Kimi e/Jet Girl" (願いごと一つキミへ/JET★GIRL, One Wish to You)	33	26	4*	6,800	Chaku-uta Full Gold	Ima, Kimi e...
2009	"Kimi ga Suki de" (キミが好きで, I Like You)	20	15	2*	10,000	Chaku-uta Double Platinum; Chaku-uta Full Platinum	Ima, Kimi e...
2009	"Jikan o Tomete..." (時間を止めて…, Stop Time...)	18	18	3	12,600	Chaku-uta Full Gold	One
2009	"Tsunaida Te" (つないだ手, Held Hands)	16	7	2	17,000	Chaku-uta Full Gold	One
2010	"Memory"	36	18	7	4,000		TBA
2010	"Hitomi Tojite mo" (瞳閉じても, Even If I Close My Eyes)	TBA	TBA	TBA	TBA		TBA

* charted on monthly ringtone (Chaku-uta) Reco-kyō Chart. All other releases charted on the RIAJ Chaku-uta Full Chart, established April 2009.
