= Fullmetal Alchemist: Brotherhood =

Japanese anime television series

- 鋼の錬金術師 FULLMETAL ALCHEMIST; Hagane no Renkinjutsushi (Note: In Japan, the "Fullmetal Alchemist" English subtitle is added behind the original Japanese title to avoid confusion with the 2003 TV series, and is generally not spoken aloud among native Japanese speakers unless for disambiguation. The subtitle can also be abbreviated down to "FA".)
- Type: TV series
- Genre: Adventure; Dark fantasy; Steampunk
- Based on: Fullmetal Alchemist
- Created by: Hiromu Arakawa
- Directed by: Yasuhiro Irie
- Series composition: Hiroshi Ōnogi
- Character designer: Hiroki Kanno
- Music by: Akira Senju
- Voices of: Romi Park; Rie Kugimiya; Shin-ichiro Miki; Megumi Takamoto; Keiji Fujiwara; Fumiko Orikasa; Kenta Miyake
- Narrated by: Iemasa Kayumi
- No. of episodes: 64 (list of episodes)

Production
- Art director: Takeshi Satō
- Sound director: Masafumi Mima
- Cinematographers: Mayuko Furumoto; Yoshiyuki Takei (#1–26)
- Color designer: Fusako Nakao
- Editor: Gō Sadamatsu
- Studio: Bones
- Producers: Hiroo Maruyama; Noritomo Yonai; Ryo Ōyama; Nobuyuki Kurashige
- Production companies: Fullmetal Alchemist Production Committee: Aniplex; Square Enix; Bones; Mainichi Broadcasting System (Note: Credited separate from the committee label)
- Runtime: 24 minutes

Original release
- Networks: MBS, TBS
- Release: April 5, 2009 – July 4, 2010

Related
- Original video animation
- Directed by: Yasuhiro Irie
- Produced by: Noritomo Yonai; Ryo Ōyama; Nobuyuki Kurashige
- Written by: Hiroshi Ōnogi
- Music by: Akira Senju
- Studio: Bones
- Licensed by: Crunchyroll (Note: In the United Kingdom through Crunchyroll UK and Ireland (formerly known as Manga Entertainment) and in Australia through Madman Anime.); NA: Aniplex of America
- Released: August 26, 2009 – August 25, 2010
- Runtime: 12–18 minutes
- Episodes: 4
- Film
- The Sacred Star of Milos (2011)

Fullmetal Alchemist: Brotherhood (Japanese: 鋼の錬金術師 FULLMETAL ALCHEMIST, Hepburn: Hagane no Renkinjutsushi) is a Japanese anime television series, serving as the second animated adaptation of the manga series Fullmetal Alchemist by Hiromu Arakawa, after the 2003 anime series. Produced by Bones, Brotherhood was directed by Yasuhiro Irie, with series composition by Hiroshi Ōnogi and music composed by Akira Senju. It was conceived to create a faithful adaptation that directly follows the entire story from the original manga, as the first anime adaptation strayed away from it to create a story exclusive to that series after running out of published manga material to adapt.

The series was officially announced in August 2008. It ran for a total of 64 episodes on MBS, TBS, and its JNN affiliates from April 2009 to July 2010. The anime also received four original video animations (OVAs), which released from August 2009 to August 2010, and a theatrical film, subtitled The Sacred Star of Milos, which released in July 2011. In North America, the series was licensed by Funimation and aired English dubbed in the United States on Adult Swim from February 2010 to September 2011. In March 2016, Funimation's license for the series expired and it was transferred over to Aniplex's subsidiary company, Aniplex of America. Funimation would later regain streaming rights to the series in November 2019.

Fullmetal Alchemist: Brotherhood has received acclaim since its initial airing and is regarded as one of the greatest anime series of all-time, with praise given to its faithfulness to the manga and its incorporation of characters and plot details that were not present in the 2003 anime series; the climactic episodes were also lauded for both their action sequences and moral messaging.

== Plot ==
Brothers Edward and Alphonse Elric are raised by their mother Trisha Elric in the remote village of Resembool in the country of Amestris. Their father Hohenheim, a noted and very gifted alchemist, abandoned his family while the boys were still young. While in Trisha's care, Ed and Al began to show an affinity for alchemy and became curious about its secrets. However, when Trisha died of a lingering illness, they were cared for by their elderly neighbor Pinako Rockbell and her granddaughter Winry Rockbell, the boys' closest friend. Ed and Al traveled the country to advance their alchemic training under teacher Izumi Curtis. Upon returning home, the brothers desperately decide to try to bring their mother back to life with alchemy. However, human transmutation is a serious alchemical taboo, as it is impossible to do so properly. In the failed transmutation, Al's body is completely disintegrated, and Ed loses his left leg. In a last attempt to keep his brother alive, Ed sacrifices his right arm to return Al's soul and binds it to a nearby suit of armor. After Edward receives automail prosthetics from Winry and Pinako, the brothers burn down their house, symbolizing their determination and decision of "no turning back", and head to the capital city to become government-sanctioned State Alchemists. After passing the exam, Edward is dubbed the "Fullmetal Alchemist" by the State Military, and the brothers begin their quest to regain their full bodies back through the fabled Philosopher's Stone under the direction of Colonel Roy Mustang. Along the way, they discover a deep government conspiracy to hide the true nature of the Philosopher's Stone that involves artificially-made humans known as homunculi, the alchemists of the neighboring nation of Xing, a scarred serial killer from the war-torn nation of Ishval, and their own father's past.

== Voice cast ==
| Character | Japanese | English |
|---|---|---|
| Edward Elric | Romi Park | Vic Mignogna |
| Alphonse Elric | Rie Kugimiya | Maxey Whitehead |
| Roy Mustang | Shin-ichiro Miki | Travis Willingham |
| Winry Rockbell | Megumi Takamoto | Caitlin Glass |
| Maes Hughes | Keiji Fujiwara | Sonny Strait |
| Riza Hawkeye | Fumiko Orikasa | Colleen Clinkenbeard |
| Scar | Kenta Miyake | J. Michael Tatum |
| Ling Yao | Mamoru Miyano | Todd Haberkorn |
| Lan Fan | Nana Mizuki | Trina Nishimura |
| May Chang | Mai Goto | Monica Rial |
| King Bradley/Wrath | Hidekatsu Shibata | Ed Blaylock |
| Lust | Kikuko Inoue | Laura Bailey |
| Envy | Minami Takayama | Wendy Powell |
| Greed | Yuichi Nakamura | Chris Patton (first); Troy Baker (second) |

== Production ==
In the 20th volume of the Fullmetal Alchemist manga, released in August 2008, series author Hiromu Arakawa announced that a second anime adaptation was being produced; the previous anime series, Fullmetal Alchemist, debuted in October 2003 and featured an anime-exclusive story direction just under midway through its run after exhausting then-available manga chapters. The Japanese title of the second adaptation is officially Hagane no Renkinjutsushi: Fullmetal Alchemist (鋼の錬金術師 FULLMETAL ALCHEMIST; commonly abbreviated as 鋼の錬金術師FA), including the English translation as a subtitle to disambiguate it from the 2003 series. As a workaround to this, the international English release instead uses the subtitle Brotherhood.

Bones produced and animated Brotherhood, with Yasuhiro Irie serving as director, Hiroshi Ōnogi as series composition writer, and Akira Senju as music composer. Voice actresses Romi Park and Rie Kugimiya reprised their roles as Edward and Alphonse Elric, respectively. Unlike the first adaptation, Brotherhood faithfully follows the complete story featured in the manga. Irie faced the difficulties of making the series as appealing as possible, and due to his large popularity within the fanbase, Irie had to properly focus on the character of Roy Mustang. When the manga was nearing its completion in May 2010, Irie announced that the Bones staff was already working on the final episodes adapting the ending and expressed shock over the conclusion.

The music was composed by Akira Senju. The first CD soundtrack from the anime was released on October 14, 2009. The second CD soundtrack was released on March 24, 2010. The third CD soundtrack became available on July 7, 2010. Fullmetal Alchemist Final Best, a compilation of opening and ending songs, was released on July 28, 2010. In June 2011, the original soundtrack of the theatrical film Fullmetal Alchemist: The Sacred Star of Milos, composed by Taro Iwashiro, was released.

The respective opening and ending themes for the first 14 episodes are "Again", performed by Yui, and "Uso" (嘘; lit. 'Lie'), performed by Sid. From episodes 15–26, the respective opening and ending themes are "Hologram" (ホログラム), performed by Nico Touches the Walls, and "Let It Out", performed by Miho Fukuhara. From episodes 27–38, the respective opening and ending themes are "Golden Time Lover" (ゴールデンタイムラバー), performed by Sukima Switch, and "Tsunaida Te" (つないだ手; lit. 'Tied Hands'), performed by Lil'B. From episodes 39–50, the respective opening and ending themes are "Period", performed by Chemistry, and "Shunkan Sentimental" (瞬間センチメンタル, lit. 'Sentimental Moment'), performed by Scandal. From episodes 51–62, the respective opening and ending themes are "Rain" (レイン), performed by Sid, and "Ray of Light", performed by Shoko Nakagawa. While episodes 63 and 64 do not use opening themes, they respectively use "Rain" and "Hologram" for their endings.

== Release ==
In March 2009, it was announced that the official English title for the series was Fullmetal Alchemist: Brotherhood, and that it would premiere outside Japan on Animax Asia, with Japanese audio and English subtitles, at 8:30 p.m. on April 10, 2009. In April 2009, Funimation announced it would stream English-subtitled episodes four days after each episode aired in Japan. Madman Entertainment would also stream it "within days" of the Japanese broadcast. The series aired from April 5, 2009, to July 4, 2010, on MBS, TBS, and its JNN affiliates on the Sunday 5:00 pm JST timeslot.

In May 2009, Funimation suspended the release of new episodes for several weeks because of an incident in which an episode of One Piece was accidentally launched before it had aired in Japan. However, the episodes were later made available on the Funimation website and the official Funimation channel on YouTube.

In August 2009, Aniplex began releasing the series on Blu-ray and DVD volumes; the first release included two episodes and an original video animation (OVA). Two more OVAs were included in the fifth and ninth volumes alongside four episodes. Other volumes feature four episodes and no OVAs. Sixteen volumes were released, the last one in November 2010. In September 2009, Funimation announced the cast for an English dub of the series, which featured a significant portion of the cast from the 2003 series dub reprising their roles. On February 14, 2010, the English dub premiered on Cartoon Network's Adult Swim programming block. It concluded its initial run there on September 25, 2011. Funimation began releasing the episodes on Blu-ray and DVD in May 2010; each release contained thirteen episodes. Five volumes were released, with the final volume having released in August 2011. In the United Kingdom, Manga Entertainment released the series in five DVD and Blu-ray volumes from 2010 to 2011, and later in a two-part box set.

In March 2016, Funimation lost the North American rights to the series after their licensing contract expired. In July 2016, it was announced that the license was transferred over to Aniplex of America, and that it would be streamed on Crunchyroll. Netflix began streaming the series in the United States and Canada in January 2018. Aniplex of America released the series on two Blu-ray disc box sets in November 2018. In November 2019, Funimation regained the streaming rights for the series. Madman Entertainment distributed the series in Australia; it was broadcast in Canada on the Super Channel and in the Philippines on TV5's AniMega programming block.

Muse Communication licensed the series in Southeast Asia for streaming on its Muse Asia YouTube channel for a limited time.

== Reception ==
Fullmetal Alchemist: Brotherhood received near-universal acclaim and is widely considered to be one of the greatest anime of all-time. On review aggregator site Rotten Tomatoes, the series holds an approval rating of 100% based on 14 reviews, with an average rating of 8/10. The site's critic consensus reads: "With impeccable world-building, rollicking action, and emotionally intelligent themes, all the elements come together to make this Fullmetal Alchemist reboot a pristine distillation of the shounen genre." It was the top-rated anime on MyAnimeList, Anime News Network and IMDb, until being overtaken by Frieren: Beyond Journey's End on MyAnimeList and Anime News Network.

D. F. Smith, writing for IGN, noted the short time-span between the releases of the 2003 series and Brotherhood, which he deemed peerless among other anime. Smith judged the pace of the first 14 episodes to be quicker than the both the original manga and the previous anime adaptation, which he interpreted as the series presuming the viewer is already familiar with the characters. While Smith observed that this approach enables reaching the more "exciting" story elements faster, he concluded that it excludes slower moments with supporting characters, such as Winry and Lieutenant Colonel Hughes, which can be found in the 2003 series.

The first 14 episodes of Brotherhood were initially criticized by members of the Anime News Network staff, who claimed that repeating events from the first anime adaptation led to a lack of suspense. Mania Entertainment's Chris Beveridge stated that the entertainment in these episodes lay in the differences in the characters' actions from the first anime series, and original content, which focused on the emotional aspects of the series. Beveridge praised the new fight scenes and the added drama, which made these episodes "solid", while Smith found the action scenes unexpectedly "compact".

Megan Gudeman of CBR called the relationships in the anime "dynamic and memorable". Chris Zimmerman from Comic Book Bin said the series "turns around and establishes its own identity" because of the inclusion of new characters and revelations absent from the first anime series, increasing its depth. He said the animation was superior to that of the first anime series; his comments focused on the characters' expressions and the execution of the fight scenes. Critics praised the conclusion, finding it satisfying; Mark Thomas of The Fandom Post called it a "virtually perfect ending to an outstanding series". Writing for the Los Angeles Times, Charles Solomon ranked Brotherhood the second-best anime of 2010 on his "Top 10" list.

The Encyclopedia of Science Fiction described Fullmetal Alchemist: Brotherhood as an engrossing and exciting anime that maintains its narrative momentum throughout its lengthy run. It praised the anime's treatment of complex moral issues, particularly its exploration of war crimes, genocide and the ethical consequences of scientific experimentation, including parallels with Nazi human experimentation. The encyclopedia highlighted the protagonists' refusal to use Philosopher's Stones once they discover their origins, as well as Roy Mustang's determination to hold perpetrators of atrocities accountable, potentially including himself. It also commended the generally solid characterization, noting the moral complexity of antagonists who sometimes become allies or are portrayed sympathetically, and the prominence of strong female characters. However, it criticized the occasional use of humor to lighten the narrative's otherwise serious tone as jarring.

== Theatrical film ==
In July 2010, immediately following the conclusion of Brotherhood, a theatrical anime film based on the series was announced. Titled Fullmetal Alchemist: The Sacred Star of Milos, the film was directed by Kazuya Murata and written by Yūichi Shinpo. It premiered in Japanese theaters on July 2, 2011. The film follows the Elrics' attempts to capture a criminal in another country. Funimation licensed the film and released it in select theaters in the United States in January 2012, and on DVD and Blu-ray on April 24 of the same year.
