= Hiroki Kanno =

Japanese animator

Hiroki Kanno (菅野 宏紀, Kanno Hiroki) (born in 1965) is a Japanese character designer and animation director. Since the 2000s, he was mainly involved with the production studio Bones, Inc. His most known works include Fullmetal Alchemist Brotherhood, RahXephon, and Bungo Stray Dogs.

== Filmography ==
=== Chief Animation Director ===
- Soul Eater
- Bungou Stray Dogs
- Zetsuen no Tempest

=== Director ===
- Cowboy Bebop: Animation Director (ep 18, 24)
- Fullmetal Alchemist: Director, Animation Director (ep 2, 8, 18, 24)
- Boku no Hero Academia 3rd season: Animation Director (ep 18)
- Boku no Hero Academia 5th season: Animation Director (ep 19, 21, 23)
- Hitsugi no Chaika: Animation Director (ep 3, 6,8 ,12)

=== Other ===
- Cowboy Bebop: Key Animation (ep 10, 13, 18-20, 22, 24-26)
- Josee, the Tiger and the Fish (2020 film): Key Animation
- Noragami: Key Animation (opening)
- Fullmetal Alchemist: Brotherhood: Character Design
- Boku no Hero Academia 6th season: Key Animation (ep 23)
