= Asian Kung-Fu Generation discography =

Japanese rock band discography

- Studio albums: 12
- Extended plays: 8
- Live albums: 1
- Compilation albums: 16
- Singles: 33
- Video albums: 22
- Music videos: 75

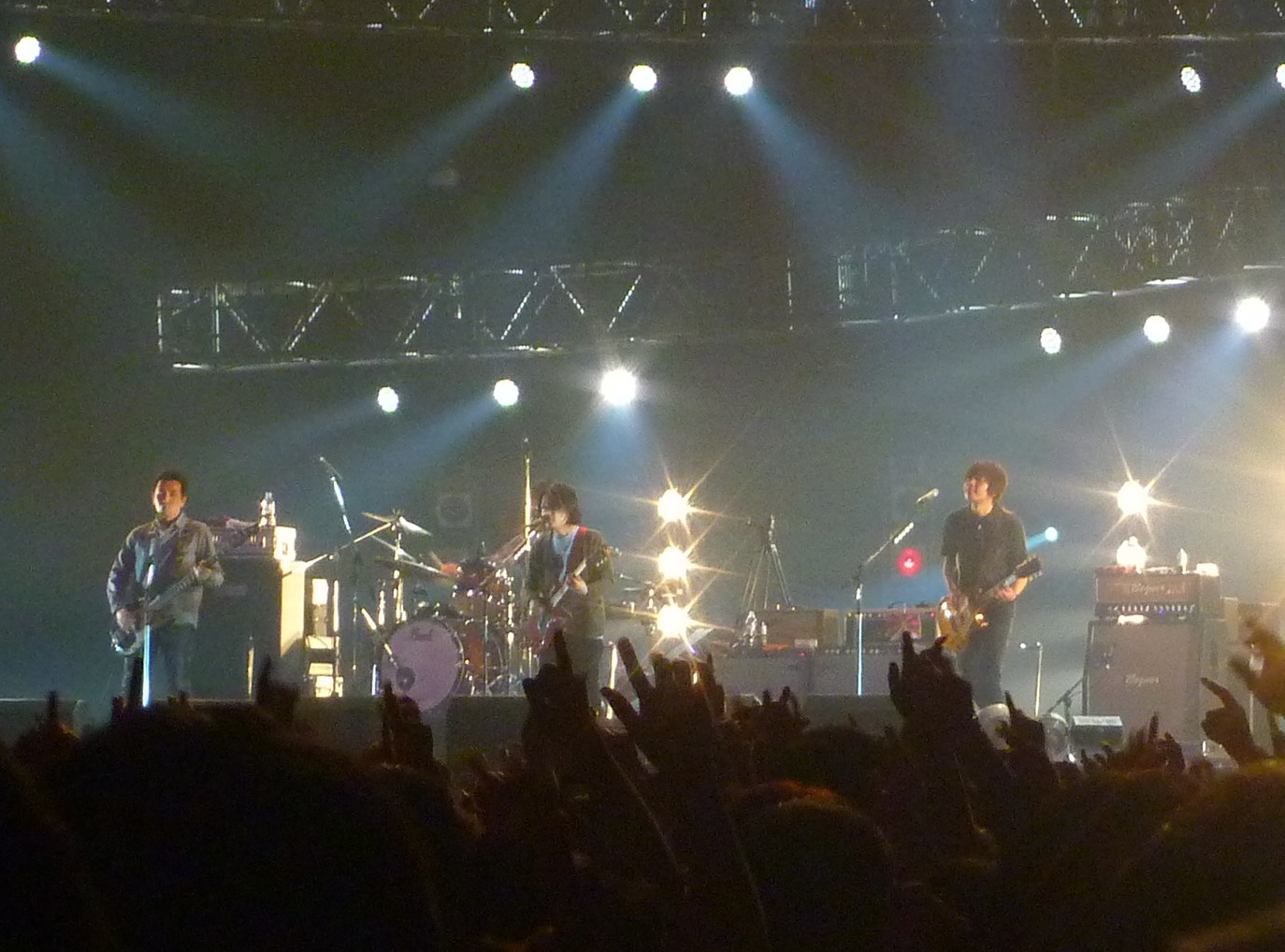
Asian Kung-Fu Generation performing at the Countdown Japan music festival

The discography of Asian Kung-Fu Generation, a Japanese rock band, consists of twelve studio albums, one live albums, fifteen compilation albums, seven extended plays, thirty three singles and seventy five music videos.

== Studio albums ==
List of studio albums, with selected chart positions
| Title | Album details | Peak chart positions | | Sales | Certifications |
| Title | Album details | JPN | JPN Hot | Sales | Certifications |
|---|---|---|---|---|---|
| Kimi Tsunagi Five M | Released: November 19, 2003; Label: Kioon; Formats: CD, digital download | 5 | — | JPN: 350,000+ | RIAJ: Platinum (phy.) |
| Sol-fa | Released: October 20, 2004; Label: Kioon, Tofu; Formats: CD, cassette, LP, digital download | 1 | — | WW : 800,000; JPN: 630,000+ | RIAJ: 2× Platinum (phy.) |
| Fanclub | Released: March 15, 2006; Label: Kioon, Gan-Shin; Formats: CD, LP, digital download | 3 | — | JPN: 260,000+ | RIAJ: Platinum (phy.) |
| World World World | Released: March 5, 2008; Label: Kioon; Formats: CD, LP, digital download | 1 | 1 | JPN: 165,000+ | RIAJ: Gold (phy.) |
| Surf Bungaku Kamakura | Released: November 5, 2008; Label: Kioon; Formats: CD, LP, digital download | 2 | 2 | JPN: 100,000+ | RIAJ: Gold (phy.) |
| Magic Disk | Released: June 23, 2010; Label: Kioon; Formats: CD, LP, digital download | 2 | 2 | JPN: 135,000+ | RIAJ: Gold |
| Landmark | Released: September 12, 2012; Label: Kioon; Formats: CD, LP, digital download | 4 | 4 | JPN: 120,000+ | RIAJ: Gold (phy.) |
| Wonder Future | Released: May 27, 2015; Label: Kioon; Formats: CD, LP, digital download | 4 | 4 | —N/a | |
| Sol-fa 2016 | Released: November 30, 2016; Label: Kioon; Formats: CD, digital download | 4 | 3 | —N/a | |
| Hometown | Released: December 5, 2018; Label: Kioon; Formats: CD, LP, digital download | 7 | 8 | —N/a | |
| Planet Folks | Released: March 30, 2022; Label: Kioon; Formats: CD, LP, digital download | 12 | 11 | JPN: 9,169 | |
| Surf Bungaku Kamakura Complete | Released: July 5, 2023; Label: Kioon; Formats: CD, LP, digital download | 5 | 3 | —N/a | |
| Asian Kung-Fu Generation | Released: January 27, 2027; Label: Kioon; Formats: CD, digital download | | | | |
"—" denotes a recording that did not chart or was not released in that territory.

== Compilation/live albums ==
List of compilation albums, with selected chart positions
| Title | Album details | Peak chart positions | | Sales | Certifications |
| Title | Album details | JPN | JPN Hot | Sales | Certifications |
|---|---|---|---|---|---|
| Nano-Mugen Compilation | Released: June 8, 2005; Label: Kioon; Format: CD | 7 | — | JPN: 50,000 | |
| Nano-Mugen Compilation 2006 | Released: July 5, 2006; Label: Kioon; Format: CD | 7 | — | JPN: 35,000 | |
| Feedback File | Released: October 25, 2006; Label: Kioon; Formats: CD, digital download | 3 | — | JPN: 140,000+ | RIAJ: Gold (phy.) |
| Nano-Mugen Compilation 2008 | Released: July 9, 2008; Label: Kioon; Format: CD | 18 | 15 | JPN: 15,000 | |
| Nano-Mugen Compilation 2009 | Released: July 1, 2009; Label: Kioon; Formats: CD, digital download | 11 | 9 | JPN: 15,000 | |
| Nano-Mugen Compilation 2011 | Released: June 29, 2011; Label: Kioon, Tsutaya; Format: CD | 17 | 16 | JPN: 10,000 | |
| Best Hit AKG | Released: January 18, 2012; Label: Kioon; Formats: CD, digital download | 1 | 70 | JPN: 150,000+ | RIAJ: Gold (phy.) |
| Nano-Mugen Compilation 2012 | Released: June 27, 2012; Label: Kioon; Formats: CD, digital download | 26 | 25 | JPN: 5,000 | |
| Nano-Mugen Compilation 2013 | Released: June 5, 2013; Label: Kioon; Formats: CD, digital download | 36 | 32 | JPN: 5,000 | |
| The Recording at NHK CR-509 Studio | Released: September 11, 2013; Label: Kioon; Formats: CD, digital download | 9 | 8 | JPN: 15,000 | |
| Feedback File 2 | Released: February 26, 2014; Label: Kioon; Formats: CD, digital download | 6 | 4 | JPN: 30,000 | |
| Nano-Mugen Compilation 2014 | Released: June 25, 2014; Label: Kioon; Formats: CD, digital download | 29 | 26 | —N/a | |
| AKG Box –20th Anniversary Edition– | Released: March 29, 2017; Label: Kioon; Format: CD | 35 | 59 | —N/a | |
| Best Hit AKG 2 (2012–2018) | Released: March 28, 2018; Label: Kioon; Formats: CD, digital download | 9 | 13 | JPN: 9,936+ | |
| Best Hit AKG Official Bootleg "HONE" | Released: March 28, 2018; Label: Kioon; Formats: CD, digital download | 34 | 44 | JPN: 3,337+ | |
| Best Hit AKG Official Bootleg "IMO" | Released: March 28, 2018; Label: Kioon; Formats: CD, digital download | 35 | 45 | JPN: 3,289+ | |
| Single Collection | Released: July 31, 2024; Label: Kioon; Formats: CD; First track "Haruka Kanata (2024 version)" was pre-released digitally on July 3, 2024 | 13 | 12 | | |
"—" denotes a recording that did not chart or was not released in that territory.

== Extended plays ==
List of extended plays, with selected chart positions
| Title | EP details | Peak chart positions | | Sales | Certifications |
| Title | EP details | JPN | JPN Hot | Sales | Certifications |
|---|---|---|---|---|---|
| Caramelman and Asian Kung-Fu Generation | Released: 2000; Label: Self-released; Format: CD | — | — | —N/a | |
| The Time Past and I Could Not See You Again | Released: 2000; Label: Self-released; Format: CD | — | — | —N/a | |
| I'm Standing Here | Released: November 30, 2001; Label: Self-released; Format: CD | — | — | —N/a | |
| Hōkai Amplifier | Released: November 25, 2002; April 23, 2003 (re-released); Label: Under Flower, Kioon; Formats: CD, LP, digital download | 45 | — | JPN: 250,000+ | RIAJ: Platinum (phy.) |
| Mada Minu Ashita ni | Released: June 11, 2008; Label: Kioon; Formats: CD, digital download | 2 | 4 | JPN: 100,000+ | RIAJ: Gold (phy.) |
| Can't Sleep EP | Released: December 5, 2018; Label: Kioon; Formats: CD, digital download | — | 55 | —N/a | |
| Surf Bungaku Kamakura (Half Carton) | Released: June 14, 2023; Label: Kioon; Formats: digital download; Pre-release of Surf Bungaku Kamakura Complete with 5 new tracks and an instrumental cover of Caramelman's "Shonan Electro" | — | — | —N/a | |
| Fujieda EP | Released: March 25, 2026; Label: Kioon; Formats: CD, digital download | 23 | — | JPN: 3,324 | |
"—" denotes a recording that did not chart or was not released in that territory.

== Singles ==
=== As lead artist ===
List of singles, with selected chart positions and certifications
| Title | Year | Peak chart positions | | Certifications | Album |
| Title | Year | JPN | JPN Hot | Certifications | Album |
|---|---|---|---|---|---|
| "Mirai no Kakera" (未来の破片) | 2003 | 34 | — | | Kimi Tsunagi Five M |
| "Kimi to Iu Hana" (君という花) | 2003 | 14 | — | RIAJ: Gold (dig.) | Kimi Tsunagi Five M |
| "Siren" (サイレン) | 2004 | 2 | — | | Sol-fa |
| "Loop & Loop" (ループ&ループ) | 2004 | 8 | 91 | RIAJ: Gold (phy.); Gold (dig.) | Sol-fa |
| "Rewrite" (リライト) | 2004 | 4 | 49 | RIAJ: Gold (phy.); Platinum (dig.); Platinum (st.) | Sol-fa |
| "Kimi no Machi Made" (君の街まで) | 2004 | 3 | — | RIAJ: Gold (phy.) | Sol-fa |
| "Blue Train" (ブルートレイン) | 2005 | 5 | — | RIAJ: Gold (phy.) | Fanclub |
| "World Apart" (ワールドアパート) | 2006 | 1 | — | RIAJ: Gold (phy.) | Fanclub |
| "Aru Machi no Gunjō" (或る街の群青) | 2006 | 4 | — | RIAJ: Gold (dig.) | World World World |
| "After Dark" (アフターダーク) | 2007 | 5 | — | RIAJ: Gold (flr.) | World World World |
| "Korogaru Iwa, Kimi ni Asa ga Furu" (転がる岩、君に朝が降る) | 2008 | 6 | 5 | | World World World |
| "Fujisawa Loser" (藤沢ルーザー) | 2008 | 6 | 5 | | Surf Bungaku Kamakura |
| "Shinseiki no Love Song" (新世紀のラブソング) | 2009 | 4 | 8 | | Magic Disk |
| "Solanin" (ソラニン) | 2010 | 3 | 2 | RIAJ: Platinum (dig.); Gold (flr.); Gold (st.) | Magic Disk |
| "Maigoinu to Ame no Beat" (迷子犬と雨のビート) | 2010 | 6 | 11 | | Magic Disk |
| "Marching Band" (マーチングバンド) | 2011 | 9 | 10 | | Best Hit AKG |
| "Kakato de Ai o Uchinarase" (踵で愛を打ち鳴らせ) | 2012 | 8 | 8 | | Landmark |
| "Sore dewa, Mata Ashita" (それでは、また明日) | 2012 | 11 | 12 | | Landmark |
| "Ima wo Ikite" (今を生きて) | 2013 | 10 | 9 | | Feedback File 2 |
| "Easter" (復活祭) | 2015 | 8 | 8 | | Wonder Future |
| “Right Now” | 2016 | 8 | 22 | | Best Hit AKG 2 |
| “Re:Re:” | 2016 | 9 | 7 | | Sol-fa 2016 |
| “Blood Circulator” (ブラッドサーキュレーター) | 2016 | 13 | 15 | | Best Hit AKG 2 |
| “Kouya wo Aruke” (荒野を歩け) | 2017 | 15 | 14 | | Hometown |
| “Boys & Girls” (ボーイズ&ガールズ) | 2018 | 18 | 38 | | Hometown |
| “Dororo" | 2019 | 17 | 47 | | Planet Folks |
| "Kaihōku" (解放区) | 2019 | 17 | — | | Planet Folks |
| "Dialogue" (ダイアローグ) | 2020 | 9 | — | | Planet Folks |
| "Furetai Tashikametai" (触れたい 確かめたい) | 2020 | 9 | — | | Planet Folks |
| "Empathy" (エンパシー) | 2021 | 17 | 60 | | Planet Folks |
| "Demachiyanagi Parallel Universe" (出町柳パラレルユニバース) | 2022 | 9 | — | | N/A |
| "Shukuen" (宿縁) | 2023 | 14 | — | | N/A |
| "Life Is Beautiful" (ライフ イズ ビューティフル) | 2025 | 16 | — | | |
| "Makuake" | 2025 | 20 | — | | |
| "Little Lennon" (小さなレノン) | 2025 | 20 | — | | |
| "Skins" (スキンズ) | 2026 | — | — | | |
"—" denotes a recording that did not chart or was not released in that territory.

=== Promotional and digital singles ===
| Title | Year | Notes | Album |
|---|---|---|---|
| Solanin (From THE FIRST TAKE) | 2021 | | — |
| Empathy (From THE FIRST TAKE) | 2021 | Featuring Hiroko Sebu | — |
| You to You | 2022 | Featuring ROTH BART BARON | Planet Folks |
| Demachiyanagi Parallel Universe | 2022 | Digital single pre-release (A-side only) ahead of physical release; OP theme for Tatami Time Machine Blues which premiered on September 14 | — |
| Shukuen | 2023 | Digital single pre-release (A-side only) ahead of physical release; 12th OP theme for Boruto anime which premiered on January 8 | — |
| Haruka Kanata (2024 version) | 2024 | Digital single pre-release ahead of Single Collection | Single Collection |
| Haruka Kanata (From THE FIRST TAKE) | 2024 | | — |
| Korogaru Iwa, Kimi ni Asa ga Furu (From THE FIRST TAKE) | 2024 | | — |
| Life is Beautiful | 2025 | Digital single pre-release (A-side only) ahead of physical release; OP theme for Farmagia anime which premiered on January 10 | — |
| MAKUAKE | 2025 | Digital single pre-release (one track only) ahead of physical release; theme song for Nano-Mugen Festival 2025 | — |
| Okaeri Jonny | 2026 | Digitial single pre-release of second track of Fujieda EP; features Ikuko Harada from Clammbon | Fujieda EP |
| Skins | 2026 | Digital single pre-release (A-side only) ahead of physical release; OP theme for third cour of Dr. Stone: Science Future anime which premiered on April 2 | |
| Times | 2026 | Tie-in song for new line of CITIZEN watches called "LIGHT in BLACK" | |

=== As featured artist ===
List of singles, with selected chart positions
| Title | Year | Peak chart positions | | Album |
| Title | Year | JPN Oricon | JPN Hot 100 | Album |
|---|---|---|---|---|
| "Wake Up!" (Tokyo Ska Paradise Orchestra featuring Asian Kung-Fu Generation) | 2014 | 9 | 14 | Ska Me Forever |
| "Beautiful Stars" (Non and Asian Kung-Fu Generation) | 2023 | — | — | PURSUE |
"—" denotes a recording that did not chart or was not released in that territory.

== Other charted and certified songs ==
List of songs, with selected chart positions
| Title | Year | Peak chart positions | Certifications | Album |
| Title | Year | JPN Hot 100 | Certifications | Album |
|---|---|---|---|---|
| "Haruka Kanata" (遥か彼方) | 2002 | — | RIAJ: Gold (dig.) | Hōkai Amplifier |
| "No.9" | 2008 | 89 | | World World World |
| "Atarashii Sekai" (新しい世界) | 2008 | 97 | | World World World |
| "Mustang" (ムスタング) | 2008 | 15 | | Mada Minu Ashita ni |
| "Natsusemi" (夏蝉) | 2008 | 36 | | Nano-Mugen Compilation 2008 |
| "Yoru no Call" (夜のコール) | 2009 | 60 | | Nano-Mugen Compilation 2009 |
| "Magic Disk" (マジックディスク) | 2010 | 20 | | Magic Disk |
| "All Right Part2" (featuring Eriko Hashimoto) | 2011 | 76 | | Nano-Mugen Compilation 2011 and Landmark |
| "Yoru o Koete" (夜を越えて) | 2012 | 66 | | Nano-Mugen Compilation 2012 |
| "Bicycle Race" (バイシクルレース) | 2012 | 81 | | Landmark |
| "Rolling Stone" (ローリングストーン) | 2014 | 81 | | Feedback File 2 |
| "Standard" (スタンダード) | 2014 | 90 | | Nano-Mugen Compilation 2014 and Wonder Future |
"—" denotes a recording that did not chart or was not released in that territory.

== Other contributions ==
| Year | Song | Album |
|---|---|---|
| 2002 | 01. "Twelve" | Whatch You Gonna Do? |
| 2004 | 01. "Haruka Kanata" | Naruto OST II |
| 2004 | 03. "Haruka Kanata" | Naruto Best Hit Collection |
| 2004 | 07. "Rewrite" | Fullmetal Alchemist Complete Best |
| 2005 | 03. "Haruka Kanata" | Kioon Records Overseas |
| 2005 | 01. "Rewrite" | Fullmetal Alchemist OST III |
| 2006 | 14. "Aru Machi no Gunjō" | Tekkon Kinkreet OST |
| 2007 | 08. "Kake Botan no Hama" | Husking Bee Tribute Album |
| 2008 | 07. "After Dark" | Bleach Best Tunes |
| 2010 | 01. "Korogaru Iwa, Kimi ni Asa ga Furu" | Solanin Songbook |
| 2014 | 02. banging the drum | Yes, We Love butchers ～Tribute to bloodthirsty butchers～ The Last Match |
| 2014 | 10. "Wake Up!" | Ska Me Forever - Tokyo Ska Paradise Orchestra |
| 2015 | 10. "Grasshopper" | JUST LIKE HONEY -『ハチミツ』20th Anniversary Tribute- (Spitz Tribute Album) |
| 2014 | 01. "Blood Circulator" | Naruto Final Best |
| 2014 | 07. "Haruka Kanata" | Naruto Final Best |
| 2016 | 01. "Loop & Loop FOR THE NEXT EDITION" | Campaign song for FOR THE NEXT 2016 (features Maguro Taniguchi from KANA-BOON and Shunichi Tanabe from BLUE ENCOUNT) |
| 2017 | 10. "SENSELESS STORY TELLER SONY" | PAUSE ~STRAIGHTENER Tribute Album~ |
| 2025 | 30. "Wake Up!" [2025 Remaster] | NO BORDER HITS 2025→2001 〜The Best of Tokyo Ska Paradise Orchestra |
| 2025 | 01. "FADE TO BLACK" | ART-SCHOOL 25th Anniversary Tribute Album: Dreams Never End |

== Videography ==
=== Music videos ===
| Year | Title | Director(s) |
|---|---|---|
| 2003 | "Haruka Kanata" | Toshikazu Miyano |
| 2003 | "Mirai no Kakera" | Suguru Takeuchi |
| 2003 | "Kimi to Iu Hana" | Toshiaki Toyoda |
| 2004 | "Siren" | Toshiaki Toyoda |
| 2004 | "Siren#" | Toshiaki Toyoda |
| 2004 | "Loop & Loop" | Kazuyoshi Oku/Masafumi Gotō |
| 2004 | "Rewrite" | Kazuyoshi Oku |
| 2004 | "Kimi no Machi Made" | Daisuke Shibata |
| 2005 | "Blackout" | Daisuke Shibata |
| 2005 | "Blue Train" | Kazuyoshi Oku |
| 2006 | "World Apart" | Nobuyuki Matsukawa |
| 2006 | "Jūni Shinhō no Yūkei" | Tetsurō Takeuchi |
| 2006 | "Kaiga Kyōshitsu" | Masakazu Fukatsu/POU |
| 2006 | "Aru Machi no Gunjō" | Hideaki Sunaga |
| 2007 | "After Dark" | Tadashi Tsukagoshi |
| 2008 | "Korogaru Iwa, Kimi ni Asa ga Furu" | Kazuyoshi Oku |
| 2008 | "Atarashii Sekai" | Kazuto Nakazawa |
| 2008 | "World World World" | Kazuto Nakazawa |
| 2008 | "Mustang" | Masatsugu Nagasoe |
| 2008 | "Natsusemi" | Hideaki Sunaga |
| 2008 | "Fujisawa Loser" | Naoto Nakanishi |
| 2009 | "Yoru no Call" | Manjot Bedi |
| 2009 | "Shinseiki no Love Song" | Erī Ōmiya |
| 2010 | "Solanin" | Takahiro Miki |
| 2010 | "Maigoinu to Ame no Beat" | Daisuke Shimada |
| 2010 | "Magic Disk" | Takahiro Miki |
| 2011 | "All Right Part 2" | Kazuaki Seki |
| 2011 | "Marching Band" | Sojiro Kamatani |
| 2012 | "Kakato de Ai o Uchinarase" | Kazuaki Seki |
| 2012 | "Yoru wo Koete" | Masakazu Fukatsu |
| 2012 | "Sore dewa, Mata Ashita" | |
| 2012 | "Bicycle Race" | Hanba Jūichi |
| 2013 | "Ima wo Ikite" | Okita Shūichi |
| 2013 | "Loser" | Tsuruoka Masahiro |
| 2014 | "Rolling Stone" | Seita Yamagishi |
| 2014 | "Standard" | Masaki Ōkita |
| 2014 | "Wake Up!" (with Tokyo Ska Paradise Orchestra) | |
| 2015 | "Easter" | Masaki Ōkita |
| 2015 | "Planet of the Apes" | Ken Iizuka |
| 2015 | "Opera Glasses" | Masaki Ōkita |
2016
| 2016 | "Right Now" | Isao Yukisada |
| 2016 | "Re:Re" | Kazuyoshi Oku |
| 2016 | "Rewrite" | Kazuyoshi Oku |
| 2016 | "Blood Circulator" | Masaki Ōkita |
| 2016 | "Yuugure no Aka" | Masaki Ōkita |
2017
| 2017 | "Kouya wo Aruke" | Nakamura Hiroki |
2018
| 2018 | "Seija no March" | Masaki Ōkita |
| 2018 | "Boys & Girls" | Masaki Ōkita |
| 2018 | "Hometown" | Masaki Ōkita |
| 2018 | "Haikyo no Kioku" | Masaki Ōkita |
| 2018 | "UCLA" | Mitsuaki Matsunaga |
| 2018 | "Rainbow Flag" | Tatsuro Kumaki |
| 2018 | "Motor Pool" | Norie Enokizono |
2019
| 2019 | "Sleep" | Jun Ōshima |
| 2019 | "Dororo" | Hiroteru Matsuda |
| 2019 | "Kaihōku" | Masaki Ōkita |
| 2020 | "Furetai Tashikametai" | |
| 2020 | "Dialogue" | Masaki Ōkita |
| 2021 | "Empathy" | Naokazu Mitsuishi |
| 2021 | "Flowers" | Takuya Katsumi |
| 2022 | "You To You" | Masaki Ōkita |
| 2022 | "De Arriba" | Daisuke Kitayama |
| 2022 | "Demachiyanagi Parallel Universe" | Yoshiyuki Shimada |
| 2022 | "Hoshi no Yoru, Hikari no Machi" | Tatsuhiko Nakahara |
| 2023 | "Shukuen" | Kazuhiko Hiramaki |
| 2023 | "Beautiful Stars" (with Non) | Atsuri Toshi |
| 2023 | "Nishikata Coast Story" | Naito Iba |
| 2023 | "Enoshima Escar" | Naito Iba |
| 2023 | "Enoshima Escar (Band Edition)" | Naito Iba |
| 2024 | "Haruka Kanata (2024 ver.) Live Edition" | |
| 2025 | "Life is Beautiful" | Masaki Ōkita |
| 2025 | "MAKUAKE" | |
| 2025 | "Little Lennon (Born in 1976 version)" | Takuto Okamoto Yuta Sawada |
| 2026 | "Okaeri Jonny" | Takaya Ōhata |
| 2026 | "Skins" | Yuichiro Saeki |

=== Video albums ===
List of video albums, with selected chart positions
| Title | Album details | Peak chart positions | |
| Title | Album details | JPN Blu-ray | JPN DVD |
|---|---|---|---|
| Eizō Sakuhinshū Vol. 1 | Released: November 26, 2004; Label: Kioon; Formats: DVD, UMD; Music video collection | — | — |
| Eizō Sakuhinshū Vol. 2 | Released: April 20, 2005; Label: Kioon; Formats: DVD, UMD; Live at Nippon Budokan from "Tour Sui Cup 2004" | — | 12 |
| Eizō Sakuhinshū Vol. 3 | Released: March 21, 2007; Label: Kioon; Format: DVD; Live at Yokohama Arena from "Tour Sui Cup 2006-2007 The start of a new season" | — | 8 |
| Eizō Sakuhinshū Vol. 4 | Released: March 26, 2008; Label: Kioon; Format: DVD; Music video collection | — | 11 |
| Eizō Sakuhinshū Vol. 5 | Released: March 25, 2009; Label: Kioon; Format: DVD; Live archives (various 2008) | — | 20 |
| Eizō Sakuhinshū Vol. 6 | Released: October 7, 2009; Label: Kioon; Formats: Blu-ray, 2DVD; Live at Kamakura Arts Center from "World World World" tour, 2009 | — | 8 |
| Eizō Sakuhinshū Vol. 7 | Released: October 7, 2011; Label: Kioon; Format: DVD; Music video collection | — | 11 |
| Eizō Sakuhinshū Vol. 8 | Released: March 13, 2013; Label: Kioon; Formats: Blu-ray, 2DVD; Live at Tokyo International Forum from "Landmark" tour, 2012 | 12 | 13 |
| Eizō Sakuhinshū Vol. 9 | Released: March 12, 2014; Label: Kioon; Formats: Blu-ray, 2DVD; Live at Yokohama Stadium from Major Debut 10th Anniversary Live, 2013 (Day 1) | 61 | 12 |
| Eizō Sakuhinshū Vol. 10 | Released: March 12, 2014; Label: Kioon; Formats: Blu-ray, 2DVD; Live at Yokohama Stadium from Major Debut 10th Anniversary Live, 2013 (Day 2) | 112 | 14 |
| Eizō Sakuhinshū Vol. 9–10 | Released: March 12, 2014; Label: Kioon; Format: 2Blu-ray; Live at Yokohama Stadium from Major Debut 10th Anniversary Live, 2013 (both days) | 3 | — |
| Eizō Sakuhinshū Vol. 11 | Released: January 6, 2016; Label: Kioon; Formats: Blu-ray, DVD; Music video collection | 22 | 22 |
| Eizō Sakuhinshū Vol. 12 | Released: March 16, 2016; Label: Kioon; Formats: Blu-ray, DVD; Live at Tokyo International Forum from "Wonder Future" tour, 2015 | 12 | 22 |
| Eizō Sakuhinshū Vol. 13 | Released: November 29, 2017; Label: Kioon; Formats: Blu-ray, Blu-ray+CD, 2DVD; Live at Nippon Budokan from 20th Anniversary tour, 2016 | 20 | 34 |
| Eizō Sakuhinshū Vol. 14 | Released: October 31, 2018; Label: Kioon; Formats: Blu-ray, Blu-ray+CD, 2DVD; Live at Shinkiba STUDIO COAST from "Bones and Yams" tour, 2018 | 15 | 30 |
| Eizō Sakuhinshū Vol. 15 | Released: December 4, 2019; Label: Kioon; Formats: Blu-ray, DVD; Live at Pacifico Yokohama from "Hometown" tour, 2019 | 35 | 38 |
| Nana-Iro Electric Tour 2019 (with Ellegarden and Straightener) | Released: August 5, 2020; Label: Kioon; Formats: Blu-ray, DVD; Live at Yokohama Arena | 3 | 3 |
| Eizō Sakuhinshū Vol. 16 | Released: June 23, 2021; Label: Kioon; Formats: Blu-ray, DVD; Live at KT Zepp Yokohama from "Tour 2020 Sui Cup 2 ~The Song of Apple~" | 35 | 45 |
| Eizō Sakuhinshū Vol. 17 | Released: August 4, 2021; Label: Kioon; Formats: Blu-ray, DVD; Music video collection | 18 | 29 |
| Eizō Sakuhinshū Vol. 18 | Released: December 28, 2022; Label: Kioon; Formats: Blu-ray; Live at Pacifico Yokohama from 25th Anniversary live, 2021 | 15 | — |
| Eizō Sakuhinshū Vol. 19 | Released: December 20, 2023; Label: Kioon; Formats: Blu-ray; Live at Yokohama Arena from "Planet Folks" tour 2022 | — | — |
| Eizō Sakuhinshū Vol. 20 | Released: September 25, 2024; Label: Kioon; Formats: Blu-ray; Live at Kamakura Art Centre from "Surf Bungaku Kamakura" tour, 2023 | — | — |
| Eizō Sakuhinshū Vol. 21 | Released: October 8, 2025; Label: Kioon; Formats: Blu-ray; Live at Yokohama BUNTAI from Fan Thanksgiving concert, 2024 | 7 | — |
"—" denotes items which did not chart.
