= The Recording at NHK CR-509 Studio =

Live album by Asian Kung-Fu Generation
- Released: September 11, 2013
- Genre: Indie rock, alternative rock,
- Length: 76:10
- Label: Ki/oon
- Producer: Asian Kung-Fu Generation

Asian Kung-Fu Generation chronology
Nano-Mugen Compilation 2013 (2013)	The Recording at NHK CR-509 Studio (2013)	Feedback File 2 (2013)

The Recording at NHK CR-509 Studio (ザ・レコーディング at NHK CR-509 Studio, Za rekōdingu at NHK CR – 509 Studio) is the first live album by Japanese rock band, Asian Kung-Fu Generation and was released on September 11, 2013. They recorded it when they performed in NHK BS's special program, "The Recording Asian Kung-Fu Generation" on April 27, 2013 and Masafumi Gotō announced it as live album on Twitter. This is the first time the band didn't use Yusuke Nakamura's artwork on their work, instead they just used a picture of the recording.

== Track listing ==
=== CD ===
All lyrics are written by Masafumi Gotō

No.	Title	Music	Length
1.	"Haruka Kanata"	Masafumi Gotō	3:59
2.	"Mirai no Kakera"	Masafumi Gotō	4:52
3.	"Kimi to Iu Hana"	Masafumi Gotō	5:54
4.	"Rewrite"	Masafumi Gotō	6:04
5.	"Blue Train"	Masafumi Gotō, Kensuke Kita	5:13
6.	"Rock and Roll, Morning Light Falls on You"	Masafumi Gotō	5:58
7.	"Mustang"	Masafumi Gotō, Takahiro Yamada	5:00
8.	"Fujisawa Loser"	Masafumi Gotō	2:39
9.	"Shinseiki no Love Song"	Masafumi Gotō	5:25
10.	"Yoru o Koete"	Masafumi Gotō	4:38
11.	"Anemone no Saku Haru ni"	Masafumi Gotō	6:15
12.	"Ima o Ikite"	Masafumi Gotō, Kensuke Kita, Takahiro Yamada, Kiyoshi Ijichi	4:55
13.	"Loser"	Beck, Karl Stephenson	5:11
Total length:			76:10

=== DVD ===
All lyrics are written by Masafumi Gotō

No.	Title	Music	Length
1.	"Loop & Loop" (ループ&ループ "Rūpu&Rūpu")	Masafumi Gotō
2.	"Marching Band"	Masafumi Gotō
3.	"Kakato de Ai o Uchinarase" (踵で愛を打ち鳴らせ "Clicking My Heels to Love")	Masafumi Gotō, Kensuke Kita
4.	"Soredewa, Mata Ashita" (それでは、また明日 "Well Then, See You Tomorrow")	Masafumi Gotō, Takahiro Yamada
5.	"A & Z" (AとZ A to Z)	Masafumi Gotō

== Personnel ==
- Masafumi Gotō – vocals, guitar,
- Kensuke Kita – guitar, vocals
- Takahiro Yamada – bass, vocals
- Kiyoshi Ijichi – drums

== Charts ==
Year	Chart	Peak position
2013	Oricon	9
