= Best Hit AKG =

Compilation album by Asian Kung-Fu Generation
- Released: January 18, 2012
- Genre: Indie rock, alternative rock
- Length: 74:52
- Label: Kioon Records, JPU Records
- Producer: Asian Kung-Fu Generation

Asian Kung-Fu Generation chronology
Magic Disk (2010)	Best Hit AKG (2012)	Landmark (2012)

Singles from Best Hit AKG
- 1. "Marching Band" Released: November 30, 2011

Best Hit AKG is a compilation album by the Japanese rock band Asian Kung-Fu Generation, released on January 18, 2012.

== History ==
Best Hit AKG is the band's first compilation album. Song selection was determined by members other than Masafumi Goto. The album includes all of their singles up until this point with the exception of "Siren", "World Apart" and "Maigoinu to Ame no Beat".

Limited edition includes bonus DVD of "Return To The Basics vol.1". Live studio recording of the songs from the 1st album "Kimi Tsunagi Five M" are included here in the same order.

Gotoh announced via Twitter that the compilation did not represent the end of the band, and that they still planned to release an original album in the summer of 2012. This became Landmark.

This album is also their first to be available for digital download in the United States via iTunes.

== Track listing ==
No.	Title	Length
1.	"Haruka Kanata"	4:03
2.	"Mirai no Kakera"	4:48
3.	"Understand"	3:45
4.	"Kimi to Iu Hana"	6:12
5.	"Rewrite"	3:46
6.	"Kimi no Machi Made"	3:37
7.	"Loop & Loop"	3:47
8.	"Blackout"	5:19
9.	"Blue Train"	4:22
10.	"Aru Machi no Gunjō"	4:23
11.	"After Dark"	3:15
12.	"Korogaru Iwa, Kimi ni Asa ga Furu"	4:39
13.	"Mustang"	4:50
14.	"Fujisawa Loser"	2:47
15.	"Shinseiki no Love Song"	5:16
16.	"Solanin"	4:35
17.	"Marching Band"	5:20

limited edition bonus DVD Return To The Basics vol.1: Kimi Tsunagi Five M Studio Live
No.	Title	Length
1.	"Flashback"
2.	"Mirai no Kakera"
3.	"Denpatō"
4.	"Understand"
5.	"Natsu no Hi, Zanzō"
6.	"Mugen Glider"
7.	"Sono Wake o"
8.	"N.G.S."
9.	"Jihei Tansaku"
10.	"E"
11.	"Kimi to Iu Hana"
12.	"No Name"

== Personnel ==
- Masafumi Gotoh – lead vocals, guitar, lyrics
- Kensuke Kita – lead guitar, background vocals
- Takahiro Yamada – bass, background vocals
- Kiyoshi Ijichi – drums
- Asian Kung-Fu Generation – producer
