= Best Hit AKG 2 =

Best Hit AKG 2 (2012–2018)

Compilation album by Asian Kung-Fu Generation
- Released: March 28, 2018
- Genres: Indie rock, alternative rock
- Label: Ki/oon Records
- Producer: Asian Kung-Fu Generation

Asian Kung-Fu Generation chronology
Sol-fa 2016 (2016)	Best Hit AKG 2 (2012–2018) (2018)

Singles from Best Hit AKG 2 (2012–2018)
- 1. "Right Now" Released: January 6, 2016; 2. "Blood Circulator" Released: July 13, 2016

Best Hit AKG 2 (2012–2018) is the second best-of album by Japanese rock band Asian Kung-Fu Generation. It was released on March 28, 2018, alongside two compilation albums, Best Hit AKG Official Bootleg "HONE" and "IMO". Best Hit AKG 2 contain songs and all singles from 2012–2018 (except Kouya wo Aruke) and new song, "Seija no March". HONE and IMO are playlist created by Masafumi Gotoh around when Best Hit AKG released. HONE has a selection of heavier tracks, whilst IMO version is a mix of “power pop” themed songs. Artwork for both albums were drawn by Gotoh and were based The Beatles's red and blue album.

== Track listing ==
All lyrics are written by Masafumi Gotoh.

CD
No.	Title	Music	Original release	Length
1.	"Yoru wo Koete" (夜を越えて Beyond the Night)	Masafumi Gotoh		4:41
2.	"Kakato de Ai o Uchinarase" (踵で愛を打ち鳴らせ Clicking My Heels To Love)	Masafumi Gotoh, Kensuke Kita	Landmark	4:25
3.	"All right part2"	Masafumi Gotoh	Landmark	4:34
4.	"Soredewa, Mata Ashita" (それでは、また明日 Well Then, See You Tomorrow)	Masafumi Gotoh, Takahiro Yamada	Landmark	4:03
5.	"Anemone no Saku Haru ni" (アネモネの咲く春に In the Spring, When the Anemone Bloom)	Masafumi Gotoh	Landmark	5:01
6.	"Ima wo Ikite" (今を生きて Living in the Now)	Masafumi Gotoh, Kensuke Kita, Takahiro Yamada, Kiyoshi Ijichi	A Story of Yonosuke	4:50
7.	"Rolling Stone" (ローリングストーン Rōringu Sutōn)	Masafumi Gotoh, Kiyoshi Ijichi		4:24
8.	"Standard" (スタンダード Sutandādo)	Masafumi Gotoh	Wonder Future	4:20
9.	"Easter" (復活祭 Fukkatsusai)	Masafumi Gotoh	Wonder Future	2:59
10.	"Planet of the Apes" (猿の惑星 Saru no Wakusei)	Masafumi Gotoh	Wonder Future	2:12
11.	"Wonder Future" (ワンダーフューチャー Wandā Fyūchā)	Masafumi Gotoh	Wonder Future	3:15
12.	"Right Now"	Masafumi Gotoh, Takahiro Yamada	Pink and Gray	4:28
13.	"Blood Circulator" (ブラッドサーキュレーター Buraddo Sākyurētā)	Masafumi Gotoh	Naruto Shippuden	3:42
14.	"Rewrite - 2016 Rerecorded" (リライト Riraito)	Masafumi Gotoh	Sol-fa 2016	4:40
15.	"Re:Re: - 2016 Rerecorded"	Masafumi Gotoh, Takahiro Yamada	Sol-fa 2016	5:32
16.	"Kaigan Doori - 2016 Rerecorded" (海岸通り Waterfront)	Masafumi Gotoh	Sol-fa 2016	5:01
17.	"Seija no March" (生者のマーチ The Survivor's March)	Masafumi Gotoh		4:42
Total length:				72:57

DVD (Live at TOYOSU PIT 2017.12.7/12.8)
No.	Title	Length
1.	"Re:Re:"	5:40
2.	"Standard"	4:24
3.	"Easter"	2:54
4.	"Planet of the Apes"	2:15
5.	"Seija no March"	4:45
6.	"Ima wo Ikite"	5:48

== HONE and IMO track listing ==
All lyrics are written by Masafumi Gotoh.

HONE
No.	Title	Music	Length
1.	"Angō no Waltz" (暗号のワルツ Waltz in Codebook)	Masafumi Gotoh	4:28
2.	"Siren" (サイレン Sairen)	Masafumi Gotoh, Takahiro Yamada	5:24
3.	"Neoteny" (ネオテニー Neotenī)	Masafumi Gotoh, Kensuke Kita	4:44
4.	"Mafuyu no Dance" (真冬のダンス Dance in Winter)	Masafumi Gotoh	3:25
5.	"Mugen Glider" (無限グライダー Eternal Glider)	Masafumi Gotoh	5:10
6.	"Kakū Seibutsu no Blues" (架空生物のブルース Blues of the Imaginary Creature)	Masafumi Gotoh	4:17
7.	"Gekkō" (月光 Moonlight)	Masafumi Gotoh	6:21
8.	"Tightrope" (タイトロープ Taito Rōpu)	Masafumi Gotoh	5:28
9.	"Korogaru Iwa, Kimi ni Asa ga Furu" (転がる岩、君に朝が降る Rock'n Roll, Morning Light Falls on You)	Masafumi Gotoh	4:37
10.	"Mada Minu Ashita ni" (未だ見ぬ明日に Into an Unseen Tomorrow)	Masafumi Gotoh	4:00
11.	"Blackout" (ブラックアウト Burakkuauto)	Masafumi Gotoh	5:21
12.	"No Name" (ノーネーム Nōnēmu)	Masafumi Gotoh, Takahiro Yamada	4:57
13.	"Shinseiki no Love Song" (新世紀のラブソング Love Song of New Century)	Masafumi Gotoh	5:16
14.	"Eien ni" (永遠に Forever)	Masafumi Gotoh	3:11
15.	"Atarashii Sekai" (新しい世界 A New World)	Masafumi Gotoh	3:18

IMO
No.	Title	Music	Length
1.	"Entrance" (エントランス Entoransu)	Masafumi Gotoh	3:59
2.	"Yūsetsu" (融雪 The Thaw)	Masafumi Gotoh, Kensuke Kita	3:27
3.	"Loop & Loop" (ループ＆ループ Rūpu&Rūpu)	Masafumi Gotoh	3:44
4.	"Microphone" (マイクロフォン Maikurofon)	Masafumi Gotoh	3:21
5.	"Understand" (アンダースタンド Andāsutando)	Masafumi Gotoh	3:44
6.	"Science Fiction" (サイエンスフィクション Saiensu Fikushon)	Masafumi Gotoh, Takahiro Yamada	2:52
7.	"Kimi to Iu Hana" (君という花 A Flower Named You)	Masafumi Gotoh	6:10
8.	"Kaigan Doori" (海岸通り Waterfront)	Masafumi Gotoh	4:40
9.	"Maigoinu to Ame no Beat" (迷子犬と雨のビート A Lost Dog and Beats of the Rain)	Masafumi Gotoh	4:56
10.	"Road Movie" (ロードムービー Rōdomūbī)	Masafumi Gotoh	4:24
11.	"Gokurakuji Heartbreak" (極楽寺ハートブレイク Gokurakuji Hātobureiku)	Masafumi Gotoh	2:21
12.	"Yes" (イエス Iesu)	Masafumi Gotoh	3:16
13.	"Shiro ni Somero" (白に染めろ Paint It White)	Masafumi Gotoh, Takahiro Yamada	3:46
14.	"Inamuragasaki Jane" (稲村ヶ崎ジェーン Inamuragasaki Jēn)	Masafumi Gotoh	3:09
15.	"Sayonara Lost Generation" (さよならロストジェネレイション Goodbye Lost Generation)	Masafumi Gotoh	5:19

== Chart ==
Year	Compilation album	Peak chart positions		
Year	Compilation album	Japan Weekly Album	Japan Hot Album	Korea Oversea
2018	Best Hit AKG 2 (2012-2018)	9	13	9
2018	Best Hit AKG Official Bootleg "HONE"	34	44	−
2018	Best Hit AKG Official Bootleg "IMO"	35	45	−
