= Shukuen =

Single by Asian Kung-Fu Generation
- Released: February 8, 2023
- Genre: Indie rock, alternative rock
- Length: 3:33
- Label: Ki/oon
- Songwriter: Masafumi Gotoh
- Producer: Asian Kung-Fu Generation

Asian Kung-Fu Generation singles chronology
"Demachiyanagi Parallel Universe" (2022)	"Shukuen" (2023)	"Life is Beautiful" (2025)

"Shukuen" (宿縁; "Karma") is a song by the Japanese rock band Asian Kung-Fu Generation. The song was initially released on digital streaming platforms on January 18, 2023, with the full single releasing on February 8.The song was used as the 12th opening theme for the anime series, Boruto: Naruto Next Generations.

It is the fourth time the band has provided music for the Naruto franchise, after "Haruka Kanata", "Sore dewa, Mata Ashita", and "Blood Circulator".

On writing a new theme for the series, Gotoh joked in an interview with Billboard that the story has become "more complicated" than when he initially started reading Naruto in Weekly Shonen Jump. He also notes research is key when writing a theme song, and that he had to write this song without knowing the future of the story, though he hoped that "the main characters would overcome these obstacles thrown at them by fate" pointing out that the story would eventually circle back to a face-off between Boruto and Kawaki (which is how the Boruto series begins).

The single has two B-sides, "Weather Report", which is sung by their guitarist, Kensuke Kita, and "Nissaka Down Hill", which is a continuation of the band's 2008 album Surf Bungaku Kamakura, with tracks named after stations on the Enoshima Electric Railway.

== Track listing ==
All lyrics are written by Masafumi Gotoh.

No.	Title	Music	Length
1.	"Shukuen" (宿縁 "Karma")	Masafumi Gotoh	3:33
2.	"Weather Report" (ウェザーリポート)	Masafumi Gotoh, Kensuke Kita	3:11
3.	"Nissaka Down Hill" (日坂ダウンヒル)	Masafumi Gotoh	3:59
Total length:			10:43

Blu-ray (ASIAN KUNG-FU GENERATION Tour 2022 "Planet Folks" at Hibiya Open Air Concert Hall 2022.7.23)
No.	Title	Length
1.	"De Arriba"
2.	"Senseless"
3.	"Travelogue"
4.	"Rolling Stone"
5.	"Slow Down"
6.	"Solanin"
7.	"Kaihōku" (解放区 "Liberation Zone")
8.	"Zai Jian" (再見 "Goodbye")
9.	"Be Alright"

== Personnel ==
- Masafumi Gotoh – lead vocals, rhythm guitar
- Kensuke Kita – lead guitar
- Takahiro Yamada – bass
- Kiyoshi Ijichi – drums
- Asian Kung-Fu Generation – producer

== Charts ==
Chart (2022)	Peak positions
Japanese Singles (Oricon)	14
Japanese Rock Singles (Oricon)	1

== Release history ==
Region	Date	Label	Format	Catalog	Notes
Worldwide	18 January 2023	Ki/oon	Digital download; streaming		Pre-release of A-side track "Shukuen"
Japan	8 February 2023	Ki/oon	CD	KSCL-3419	Full release of single, including B-side tracks
Japan	8 February 2023	Ki/oon	CD+BD	KSCL-3417	Full release of single, including B-side tracks
Various	8 February 2023	Ki/oon	Digital download; streaming		Full release of single, including B-side tracks
