= Dororo/Kaihōku =

Single by Asian Kung-Fu Generation

from the album Planet Folks
- Released: 15 May 2019
- Studio: Landmark Studio; Cold Brain Studio
- Length: 2:41 (Dororo); 4:14 (Kaihōku)
- Label: Ki/oon
- Songwriter(s): Masafumi Gotoh (Lyrics) Masafumi Gotoh; Takahiro Yamada (Music)
- Producer(s): Asian Kung-Fu Generation

Asian Kung-Fu Generation singles chronology
| "Boys & Girls" (2018) | "Dororo/Kaihōku" (2019) | "Dialogue/Furetai Tashikametai" (2020) |

"Dororo" and "Kaihōku" (解放区, Liberation Zone) are songs by Japanese rock band Asian Kung-Fu Generation. Both songs were released as a double A-side and become their 26th single on 15 May 2019. "Dororo" was used as second opening theme for 2019 anime, Dororo. Prior to the single release, "Dororo" was available for digital download on iTunes.

"Kaihōku" is the official support song of Fujieda MYFC, and it was broadcast at the stadium in a match against AC Nagano Parceiro before the single's release. Gotoh is also scheduled to perform the song at Fujieda's upcoming game against Vegalta Sendai on 12 July 2025.

== Music video ==
The music video for "Dororo" was directed by Hiroteru Matsuda. The video presented in disturbing theme with a strange creature wanders inside building and Masafumi Gotoh sing with water effect in different scenes. The video itself is about "a strange creature that lives in a human heart".

The music video for "Kaihōku" was directed by Masaki Ōkita. They shot the music video on 23 April 2019 and recruited 200 fans as extras. The video starts with Gotoh sleeping on a moving couch, then waking up to sing the song. Other band members enter the building with many shoes and papers spread around. In a different scene, everyone looks sad and in despair. But during Gotoh's poetry, the door opens and they start to go out. The video ends with band and fans are singing together cheerfully and moving on.

== Track listing ==
All lyrics are written by Masafumi Gotoh; all music is composed by Gotoh and Takahiro Yamada.

CD
| No. | Title | Length |
|---|---|---|
| 1. | "Dororo" | 2:41 |
| 2. | "Kaihōku" (解放区 Liberation Zone) | 4:14 |
| Total length: | | 6:55 |

Limited Edition (Blu-ray)
| No. | Title | Length |
|---|---|---|
| 1. | "Senseless" |
| 2. | "Standard" |
| 3. | "Marching Band" |
| 4. | "Siren" |
| 5. | "Seija no March" |
| 6. | "Hometown" |
| 7. | "Kouya wo Aruke" |
| 8. | "Re:Re:" |
| 9. | "Ima wo Ikite" |
| 10. | "Boys & Girls" |

== Personnel ==
Adapted from the album liner notes.

Asian Kung-Fu Generation

- Masafumi Gotoh – vocals, guitars, recording
- Kiyoshi Ijichi – drums, vocals
- Kensuke Kita – guitars, vocals
- Takahiro Yamada – bass guitar, vocals

Additional musicians

- Achico – vocals, (track 2)
- Yosuke Inomata – vocals (track 2)
- Ai Iwasaki – vocals (track 2)
- Makoto Komori – vocals (track 2)
- Ryosuke Shimomura – vocals (track 2)

Production

- Greg Calbi – mastering
- Kenichi Nakamura – recording, mixing

Artwork and design

- Yutaka Kimura – design
- Yusuke Nakamura – illustration

== Charts ==
=== Dororo/Kaihōku ===
| Year | Chart | Peak position |
|---|---|---|
| 2019 | Oricon | 17 |

=== Dororo ===
| Year | Chart | Peak position |
|---|---|---|
| 2019 | Japan Hot 100 | 47 |
| 2019 | Japan Hot Animation | 10 |

== Release history ==
| Region | Date | Label | Format | Catalog |
|---|---|---|---|---|
| Japan | 22 April 2019 | Ki/oon | Digital download (Dororo) | |
| Japan | 15 May 2019 | Ki/oon | CD | KSCL-3148 |
| Japan | 15 May 2019 | Ki/oon | CD+DVD | KSCL-3146 |
| Japan | 15 May 2019 | Ki/oon | Digital download | |
