= Landmark (Asian Kung-Fu Generation album) =

Studio album by Asian Kung-Fu Generation
- Released: September 12, 2012
- Recorded: 2011–2012
- Genres: Indie rock, alternative rock
- Length: 45:57
- Label: Kioon
- Producer: Asian Kung-Fu Generation

Asian Kung-Fu Generation chronology
Best Hit AKG (2012)	Landmark (2012)	Feedback File 2 (2014)

Singles from Landmark
- 1. "Kakato de Ai o Uchinarase" Released: April 11, 2012; 2. "Sore dewa, Mata Ashita" Released: July 25, 2012

Landmark is the seventh studio album by the Japanese rock band Asian Kung-Fu Generation, released on September 12, 2012.

== History ==
Recording of the album began after March 2011, when the band's nationwide tour for Magic Disk was interrupted by the Tōhoku earthquake. Gotoh stated that he had been planning to leave the band after the tour and the recording of Landmark. Whilst recording the album, the band members did believe that they would not continue after its production, however they were able to reconcile and finish the recording with the assistance of their support members (Iwasaki, Mihara, Ueda) at the time. Gotoh also confirmed that if the tour hadn't been cancelled due to the earthquake, he would have left the band.

In July 2012, shortly after their 2012 Nano-Mugen Festival, the title and release date of the album were announced, along with a 22-show nationwide tour in support of the album.

On August 2, Gotoh claimed that the album "is a masterpiece" via Twitter.

On August 8, the album art was revealed and credited to Yusuke Nakamura, a long time art collaborator with the band. The track list was also confirmed, revealing that "All Right Part 2" will be the second song to appear on both a Nano-Mugen Compilation and a studio album (the first being "Blackout", which appeared on the first Nano-Mugen Compilation as well as Fanclub.) "N2" was previously released on the "Marching Band" single as a b-side, similar to three tracks on Surf Bungaku Kamakura.

On August 28, the song "Bicycle Race" was first played on "School of Lock", a segment on a radio station in Tokyo. The music video for the song was released on September 7.

Two different limited editions of the album were released, with one including an LP version of the album, and the other a compilation DVD of songs performed at both a 2011 Nano-Mugen festival concert, and a 2012 Best Hit AKG concert.

The album became the band's first original album to be made available for purchase in the United States through the iTunes store, being released on October 17.

== Track listing ==
The track list for the album was confirmed by Gotoh on his diary on August 23, 2012.

=== Disc 1 (CD - Landmark) ===
All lyrics are written by Masafumi Gotoh.

No.	Title	Music	Length
1.	"All Right Part 2" (featuring Hashimoto Eriko (from Chatmonchy))	Masafumi Gotoh, Kensuke Kita	3:34
2.	"N2"	Masafumi Gotoh	3:06
3.	"1.2.3.4.5.6. Baby"	Masafumi Gotoh, Kensuke Kita	3:24
4.	"A & Z" (AとZ A to Z)	Masafumi Gotoh, Kiyoshi Ijichi	4:38
5.	"Taiyō Kōro" (大洋航路 "Oceanic Route")	Masafumi Gotoh	3:15
6.	"Bicycle Race" (バイシクルレース Baishikuru Rēsu)	Masafumi Gotoh	4:16
7.	"Sore dewa, Mata Ashita" (それでは、また明日 "Well Then, See You Tomorrow")	Masafumi Gotoh, Takahiro Yamada	3:42
8.	"1980"	Masafumi Gotoh, Takahiro Yamada	3:36
9.	"Machine Guns to Keiyōshi" (マシンガンと形容詞 "Machine Guns and Adjectives")	Masafumi Gotoh	3:54
10.	"Railroad" (レールロード Reirurōdo)	Masafumi Gotoh, Kensuke Kita	3:08
11.	"Kakato de Ai o Uchinarase" (踵で愛を打ち鳴らせ "Clicking My Heels To Love")	Masafumi Gotoh, Kensuke Kita	4:23
12.	"Anemone no Saku Haru ni" (アネモネの咲く春に "In the Spring, When the Anemone Bloom")	Masafumi Gotoh	5:01

=== Disc 2 (Limited Edition Live DVD) ===
- All songs are from the "Best Hit AKG" concert held on February 23, 2012, except for track 8 "All right part2", recorded from the Nano-Mugen 2011 circuit.

No.	Title	Length
1.	"After Dark" (アフターダーク Afutā Dāku)	3:15
2.	"Solanin"	4:35
3.	"Marching Band" (Originally released on the "Marching Band" single)	5:20
4.	"Rewrite" (リライト Riraito)	3:47
5.	"Loop & Loop" (ループ&ループ Rūpu & Rūpu)	3:45
6.	"Kimi to Iu Hana" (君という花 "A Flower Called You")	6:10
7.	"Kakato de Ai o Uchinarase" (踵で愛を打ち鳴らせ "Clicking My Heels to Love")	4:23
8.	"All Right Part 2" (with Eriko Hashimoto from Chatmonchy)	3:34

== Personnel ==
- Masafumi Gotoh - vocals, guitar, programming
- Kensuke Kita - guitar, vocals
- Takahiro Yamada - bass, vocals
- Kiyoshi Ijichi - drums, percussion, synthesizer
