= I'm Standing Here =

EP by Asian Kung-Fu Generation
- Released: November 30, 2001
- Genre: Indie rock, alternative rock
- Length: 22:10
- Producer: Asian Kung-Fu Generation

Asian Kung-Fu Generation chronology
The Time Past and I Could Not See You Again (2000)	I'm Standing Here (2001)	Hōkai Amplifier (2003)

I'm Standing Here is an early EP album by Japanese rock band Asian Kung-Fu Generation, released on November 30, 2001.

== Background ==
Including their split mini-album with rock musician Caramelman, I'm Standing Here was the third and last independent EP the band recorded before releasing their major-label debut EP, Hōkai Amplifier. In contrast to their previous indie releases, the band composed the songs featured on the mini-album mostly with Japanese lyrics. While the mini-album retained only one single, "Konayuki," it came to receive significant airplay on indie radio stations and a redone version was later included within the band's debut EP. Additionally, "E" would later be redone for their first full-length album, Kimi Tsunagi Five M, while "Hold Me Tight" would be re-recorded for the single, "Kimi no Machi Made," and included on their compilation album, Feedback File.

== Track listing ==
1. "Hold Me Tight" – 4:14
2. "Need Your Love" – 2:02
3. "Konayuki" (Subtle Mix) (粉雪, "Powder Snow") – 3:47
4. "Unmei" (運命, "Fate") – 3:14
5. "I'm Standing Here" – 4:18
6. "E" – 4:35

== Personnel ==
- Masafumi Gotō – lead vocals, guitar, lyrics
- Kensuke Kita – lead guitar, background vocals
- Takahiro Yamada – bass, background vocals
- Kiyoshi Ijichi – drums
