= Feedback File 2 =

Compilation album by ASIAN KUNG-FU GENERATION
- Released: February 26, 2014
- Recorded: 2002–2013
- Genre: Indie rock, alternative rock
- Label: Ki/oon
- Producer: Asian Kung-Fu Generation

ASIAN KUNG-FU GENERATION chronology
Landmark (2012)	Feedback File 2 (2014)	Wonder Future (2015)

Singles from Feedback File 2
- 1. "Ima wo Ikite" Released: February 20, 2013

Feedback File 2 (フィードバックファイル 2, Fīdobakku Fairu 2) is the third compilation album by Japanese rock band Asian Kung-Fu Generation, released on February 26, 2014. The album consists of B-side tracks from previously released studio singles, recordings of live performances, tracks from previous Nano-Mugen Compilations and two new songs yet to be released on an album, "Rolling Stone" and "Slow Down". The limited edition two-disc DVD version includes live footage from the band's European and Asian tours in 2013.

== Track listing ==
1. "Rolling Stone" (ローリングストーン)
2. "Slow Down" (スローダウン)
3. "Evening Glow of Duodecimal" (十二進法の夕景, Jūni Shinhō no Yūkei)
4. "Summer Cicada" (夏蝉, Natsuzemi)
5. "Call of the Night" (夜のコール, Yoru no Kōru)
6. "Let's Paint it White" (白に染めろ, Shiro ni Somero)
7. "Mustang (mix for Meiko)" (ムスタング (mix for 芽衣子))
8. "Hope After the Rain" (雨上がりの希望, Ameagari no Kibō)
9. "Light" (ひかり, Hikari)
10. "Old School" (オールドスクール)
11. "Reload Reload" (リロードリロード)
12. "Beyond the Night" (夜を越えて, Yoru o Koete)
13. "Senseless Refrigerator Jokes" (冷蔵庫のろくでもないジョーク, Reizōko no Roku Demo Nai Joke)
14. "The Beast of the Beast" (ケモノノケモノ, Kemono no kemono)
15. "Live Now (今を生きて, Ima o Ikite)
16. "A Lost Dog and Beats of the Rain" (2010 @ Wakasu Park) (迷子犬と雨のビート（2010 江東区立若洲公園）, Maigoinu to Ame no Bīto (2010 Kōtō kuritsu Wakasu kōen))
17. "In the Spring when the Anemone Blooms (2012 @ Tokyo International Forum) (アネモネの咲く春に（2012 東京国際フォーラム）, Anemone no Saku Haru ni (2012 Tōkyō Kokusai Fōramu))

=== DVD ===
2013 European Tour

1. "Blue Train" (ブルートレイン) (31 May 1013 at O2 Academy Islington, UK)
2. "Re:Re:"(2 June 2013 at Le Bataclan, France）
3. "Haruka Kanata" (遥か彼方) (3 June at Gloria, Germany)

TOKYO FM present EARTH×HEART PROJECT
ASIAN KUNG-FU GENERATION×STRAIGHTENER －10th Anniversary－ ASIA CIRCUIT

1. "Solanin" (ソラニン) (17 December 2013 at UNIQLO AX, Korea)
2. "Kimi to Iu Hana" (君という花) (20 December 2013 at SCAPE - The Ground Theatre, Singapore)
3. "1980" (22 December 2013 at Legacy Taipei, Taiwan)

== Personnel ==
- Masafumi Gotō – lead vocals, guitar
- Kensuke Kita – lead guitar, background vocals
- Takahiro Yamada – bass, background vocals
- Kiyoshi Ijichi – drums
- Asian Kung-Fu Generation – producer
