= Wonder Future =

Studio album by Asian Kung-Fu Generation
- Released: May 27, 2015
- Genre: Alternative rock, power pop
- Length: 43:44
- Label: Ki/oon Music
- Producer: Masafumi Gotoh

Asian Kung-Fu Generation chronology
| Feedback File 2 (2014) | Wonder Future (2015) | Sol-fa (2016) (2016) |

Singles from Wonder Future
- 1. "Easter" Released: 18 March 2015

Wonder Future is the eighth studio album by Japanese rock band Asian Kung-Fu Generation, released on May 27, 2015, through Sony Music subsidiary Ki/oon Music. The album is the first by the band to not feature art by artist Yusuke Nakamura.

== Release ==
The album was released on May 27, 2015, in Japan. The album was followed by two tours, one through Japan and one through Europe. The song "Easter" was released as a single earlier in the year. In addition, the song "Standard" was included on the band's Nano-Mugen Compilation 2014 and used for Nikon 1 J4 commercial song. The song "Planet of the Apes" was used as the theme song for the show Replay & Destroy.

On 21 May 2025, the band will be releasing a re-recording of second track "Little Lennon" called "Little Lennon (Born in 1976 ver.)" as part of double A-side single "MAKUAKE/Little Lennon". The re-recording is arranged by Shigeru Kishida from Quruli.

== Track listing ==
All tracks are written by Masafumi Gotoh, tracks 2, 3, 7, and 11 are co-written by other band members.

Regular edition
| No. | Title | Length |
|---|---|---|
| 1. | "Easter" (復活祭) | 2:59 |
| 2. | "Little Lennon" (小さなレノン) | 4:00 |
| 3. | "Winner and Loser" (勝者と敗者) | 4:01 |
| 4. | "Caterpillar" (芋虫) | 3:32 |
| 5. | "Eternal Sunshine" (永遠の陽光) | 4:59 |
| 6. | "Planet of the Apes" (猿の惑星) | 2:10 |
| 7. | "Standard" (スタンダード) | 4:18 |
| 8. | "Wonder Future" (ワンダーフューチャー) | 4:09 |
| 9. | "Prisoner in a Frame" (額の中の囚人) | 4:34 |
| 10. | "Signal on the Street" (街頭のシグナル) | 4:17 |
| 11. | "Opera Glasses" (オペラグラス) | 4:44 |
| Total length: | | 43:44 |

== Personnel ==
Adapted from the album liner notes.

Asian Kung-Fu Generation

- Masafumi Gotoh – vocals, guitars
- Kiyoshi Ijichi – drums
- Kensuke Kita – guitars, vocals
- Takahiro Yamada – bass guitar, vocals

Additional musicians

- Ryosuke Shimomura, Ai Iwasaki - vocals (track 8)

Production

- Masafumi Gotoh - producer
- Brian Gardner – mastering
- Nick Raskulinecz – mixing
- John Lousteau - track recording
- Kenichi Nakamura - vocal recording

Artwork and design

- Yutaka Kimura – design

== Chart positions ==
| Chart (2015) | Peak position | Weeks on charts | Sales |
|---|---|---|---|
| Oricon | 4 | 14 | 45 611 (physical) |
