= Caramelman and Asian Kung-Fu Generation =

EP by ASIAN KUNG-FU GENERATION
- Released: 2000
- Genre: Indie rock, alternative rock
- Length: 12:50

ASIAN KUNG-FU GENERATION chronology
Caramelman and Asian Kung-Fu Generation (2000)	The Time Past and I Could Not See You Again (2000)

Caramelman and Asian Kung-Fu Generation is an early EP by Japanese rock band Asian Kung-Fu Generation, released during their indie days. The mini-album was a joint-work with Caramelman and composed almost entirely in English lyrics. The fourth track, "Aono Uta," was later re-recorded and included within the band's major-label debut EP, Hōkai Amplifier.

== Track listing ==
1. "S.E. (Sexy Eddy)"
2. "There Is No Hope"
3. "Love"
4. "Ao no Uta" (青の歌, Song of Blue)
5. "Baby Sleep Tonight"

== Personnel ==
- Masafumi Gotō – lead vocals, guitar, lyrics
- Kensuke Kita – lead guitar, background vocals
- Takahiro Yamada – bass, background vocals
- Kiyoshi Ijichi – drums
