= Empathy (Asian Kung-Fu Generation song) =

Single by Asian Kung-Fu Generation

from the album Planet Folks
- Released: August 4, 2021
- Studio: Landmark Studio; Cold Brain Studio; Xylomania Studio LLC
- Length: 4:44
- Label: Ki/oon
- Songwriter: Masafumi Gotoh
- Producers: Asian Kung-Fu Generation, Ryosuke Shimomura

Asian Kung-Fu Generation singles chronology
"Dialogue/Furetai Tashikametai" (2020)	"Empathy" (2021)	"Demachiyanagi Parallel Universe" (2022)

"Empathy" (エンパシー, Enpashī) is a song by Japanese rock band Asian Kung-Fu Generation. It was released as single on August 4, 2021, and it was used as the theme song for the 2021 anime film, My Hero Academia: World Heroes' Mission. The single's B-side, Flowers also added as insert song for the same film. The single was produced and arranged by Asian Kung-Fu Generation and Ryosuke Shimomura, who also support member for their live concerts.

== Track listing ==
All lyrics are written by Masafumi Gotoh; all music is composed by Masafumi Gotoh.

CD
No.	Title	Length
1.	"Empathy" (エンパシー Enpashī)	4:44
2.	"Flowers" (フラワーズ Furawāzu)	5:21
3.	"Furetai Tashikametai (Seiho Remix)" (触れたい 確かめたい (Seiho Remix) I Want To Touch You And Be Sure (Seiho Remix))	5:44
4.	"Empathy (Instrumental)"	4:44
5.	"Flowers (Instrumental)"	5:21
Total length:		25:55

DVD
No.	Title	Length
1.	"Empathy (music video)"
2.	"Empathy (music video making)"

== Personnel ==
Adapted from the single liner notes.

Asian Kung-Fu Generation

- Masafumi Gotoh – vocals, guitars
- Kiyoshi Ijichi – drums
- Kensuke Kita – guitars, vocals
- Takahiro Yamada – bass guitar, vocals

Production

- Asian Kung-Fu Generation - production
- Kenichi Koga – recording (track 1 & 2), mixing (track 1 & 2), protools programming (track 1 & 2)
- Mai Kondo – assistant engineered (track 1 & 2)
- Randy Merrill - mastering
- Kenichi Nakamura – recording (track 1 & 2)
- Ryoma Nakamura – assistant engineered (track 1 & 2)
- Hajime Yamamoto – editing (track 1 & 2)

Artwork and design

- Yusuke Nakamura – illustration

Additional musicians

- ermhoi – chorus (track 2)
- Yosuke Inoue – acoustic guitar advisor (track 2)
- Fumihiro Ibuki – drum technician (track 1 & 2)
- Mariko Hirose – strings section arrangement (track 2)
- Shuta Nishida – guitar sound adviser (track 1 & 2) guitar noise (track 1)
- Seiho – remix (track 3)
- Ryosuke Shimomura – synthesizers (track 1 & 2), programming (track 1 & 2), editing (track 1 & 2), production
- Naoto Tange – equipment staff (track 2)
- Koji Yamada – equipment staff (track 1 & 2)
- YOUSAYSOUNDS – fuzz (track 2)
- Tomoe Nakajima (Yasuko Murata Strings) – 1st violin (track 2)
- Leina Ushiyama (Yasuko Murata Strings) – 1st violin (track 2)
- Sena Oshima (Yasuko Murata Strings) – 2nd violin (track 2)
- Anzu Suhara (Yasuko Murata Strings) – 2nd violin (track 2)
- Mikiyo Kikuchi (Yasuko Murata Strings) – viola (track 2)
- Yasuko Murata (Yasuko Murata Strings) – viola (track 2)
- Robin Dupuy (Yasuko Murata Strings) – cello (track 2)
- Shuhei Ito (Yasuko Murata Strings) – cello (track 2)

== Charts ==
Chart (2021)	Peak positions
Japanese Singles (Oricon)	17
Japanese Anime Singles (Oricon)	8
Japanese Rock Singles (Oricon)	1
Japan Hot 100 (Billboard)	60
Japan Hot Animation (Billboard)	7

== Release history ==
Region	Date	Label	Format	Catalog
Japan	August 4, 2021	Ki/oon	CD	KSCL-3308
Japan	August 4, 2021	Ki/oon	CD+DVD	KSCL-3306
Various	August 4, 2021	Ki/oon	Digital download; streaming	
