= Solanin (song) =

Single by Asian Kung-Fu Generation

from the album Magic Disk
- B-side: "Mustang (mix for Meiko)"
- Released: March 31, 2010
- Studio: Landmark Studio
- Genre: Indie rock
- Label: Ki/oon Records; KSCL-1575
- Composer: Masafumi Gotoh
- Lyricist: Inio Asano
- Producer: Asian Kung-Fu Generation

Asian Kung-Fu Generation singles chronology
"Shinseiki no Love Song" (2009)	"Solanin" (2010)	"Maigoinu to Ame no Beat" (2010)

"Solanin" (ソラニン, Soranin) is a song by Japanese rock band, Asian Kung-Fu Generation. It was released as a single on March 31, 2010. The song was written for the film of the same name. The music was composed by band member Masafumi Gotoh, while the lyrics were written by Inio Asano, creator of the manga of the same name that the film is based on. Asian Kung-Fu Generation's recording was not used in the film. Instead, a cover, credited to Rotti, a fictional band from the film, with vocals by Aoi Miyazaki, who plays Meiko in the film, was used.

The single's B-side, "Mustang (mix for Meiko)" is a remix of "Mustang" from the band's 2008 EP Mada Minu Ashita ni. The song, which was also inspired by the manga, was used as the ending theme of the film. "Solanin" was included as an "extra track" on their sixth studio album, Magic Disk, and "Mustang (mix for Meiko)" is included in the band's compilation album Feedback File 2.

== Music video ==
The music video for "Solanin" was directed by Takahiro Miki, who also directed the film. The video features the band members walking around a city and playing a gig. Gotoh plays a Fender Mustang, the same guitar played by the main character of the film.

== Track listing ==
No.	Title	Lyrics	Music	Length
1.	"Solanin" (ソラニン)	Inio Asano	Masafumi Gotoh	4:32
2.	"Mustang (mix for Meiko)" (ムスタング（mix for 芽衣子）)	Masafumi Gotoh	Masafumi Gotoh, Takahiro Yamada	5:07
Total length:				9:39

== Personnel ==
- Masafumi Gotoh – lead vocals, rhythm guitar
- Kensuke Kita – lead guitar, background vocals
- Takahiro Yamada – bass, background vocals
- Kiyoshi Ijichi – drums
- Asian Kung-Fu Generation – production

== Charts ==
Weekly chart performance for "Solanin"
Chart (2010)	Peak position
Japan (Oricon)	3
Japan Hot 100 (Billboard Japan)	2

Annual chart rankings for "Solanin"
Chart (2010)	Rank
Japan Adult Contemporary (Billboard)	58

== Release history ==
Region	Date	Label	Format	Catalog
Japan	31 March 2010	Ki/oon	CD	KSCL-1575
