= Feedback File =

Compilation album by ASIAN KUNG-FU GENERATION
- Released: October 25, 2006
- Recorded: 2001–2006
- Genre: Indie rock
- Length: 58:36
- Label: Ki/oon
- Producer: Asian Kung-fu Generation

ASIAN KUNG-FU GENERATION chronology
Fanclub (2006)	Feedback File (2006)	World World World (2008)

Feedback File (フィードバックファイル, Fīdobakku Fairu) is the first compilation album by Japanese rock band Asian Kung-Fu Generation, released on October 25, 2006. The album is primarily composed of B-side tracks from previously released studio singles and recordings of live performances, with the exception of two new non-album tracks, "Kaiga Kyōshitsu" and "Dōdōmeguri no Yoru." It was released with a limited edition two-disc DVD version which included additional live footage.

== Track listing ==
All lyrics are written by Masafumi Gotoh; all music is composed by Masafumi Gotoh, except "Siren#2" and "Re:Re: by Gotoh and Takahiro Yamada

CD
No.	Title	Length
1.	"Entrance" (エントランス Entoransu)	3:58
2.	"Rocket No.4" (ロケットNo.4 Roketto No.4)	3:42
3.	"Kaiga Kyōshitsu" (絵画教室 Art Class)	3:23
4.	"Siren#2" (サイレン#2 Sairen#2)	6:13
5.	"Yūgure no Aka" (夕暮れの紅 Crimson Dusk)	4:16
6.	"Hold me tight"	4:04
7.	"Road Movie" (ロードムービー Rōdo Mūbī)	4:25
8.	"Tobenai Sakana" (飛べない魚 Flightless Fish)	2:58
9.	"Dōdōmeguri no Yoru" (堂々巡りの夜 A Night of Going in Circles)	2:27
10.	"Uso to Wonderland" (嘘とワンダーランド Lies and Wonderland)	2:28
11.	"Eien ni" (永遠に Forever)	3:12
12.	"Jihei Tansaku" (自閉探索 (Search Within) Social Withdrawal) (2004 Shibuya-AX))	3:22
13.	"Flashback" (フラッシュバック Furasshubakku (2004 @State Hitachi Seaside Park))	2:24
14.	"Understand" (アンダースタンド Andāsutando (2004 @State Hitachi Seaside Park))	3:45
15.	"N.G.S" (2005 @Shibuya-AX)	2:53
16.	"Re:Re:" (2006 @Yokohama Arena)	5:03
Total length:		58:34

=== DVD ===
1. "Haruka Kanata" (2003 @ Shibuya Club Quattro) (遥か彼方 (2003 渋谷クラブクアトロ))
2. "Mirai no Kakera"(2003 @ Shinjuku Liquidroom)(未来の破片 (2003 新宿リキッドルーム))
3. "Kimi to Iu Hana" (2004 @ Government Managed Seaside Park)(君という花 (2004 国営ひたち海浜公園))
4. "Rewrite" (2005 @ SHIBUYA-AX) (リライト)
5. "Loop & Loop" (2005 @ Yokohama Arena) (ループ&ループ (2005 横浜アリーナ))

== Personnel ==
- Masafumi Gotō – lead vocals, guitar
- Kensuke Kita – lead guitar, background vocals
- Takahiro Yamada – bass, background vocals
- Kiyoshi Ijichi – drums
- Asian Kung-Fu Generation – producer
- Tohru Takayama – mixing
- Mitsuharu Harada – mastering
- Kenichi Nakamura – recording
- Yusuke Nakamura – art direction

== Chart positions ==
Year	Chart	Peak positions
2006	Oricon	2
2006	World Chart	17
