= Dialogue/Furetai Tashikametai =

- Regular edition, Type A and Dialogue cover

Single by Asian Kung-Fu Generation

from the album Planet Folks
- Released: 7 October 2020
- Studio: RAK Studio
- Length: 4:40 (Dialogue); 4:42 (Furetai Tashikametai)
- Label: Ki/oon
- Songwriter(s): Masafumi Gotoh
- Producer(s): Asian Kung-Fu Generation

Asian Kung-Fu Generation singles chronology
"Dororo/Kaihōku" (2019)	"Dialogue/Furetai Tashikametai" (2020)	"Empathy" (2021)

Other cover
- Type B and Furetai Tashikametai cover

"Dialogue" (ダイアローグ, Daiarōgu) and "Furetai Tashikametai" (触れたい 確かめたい, I Want To Touch You And Be Sure) are songs by Japanese rock band Asian Kung-Fu Generation. Both songs were released as a double A-side and become their 27th single on 7 October 2020. "Furetai Tashikametai" features Moeka Shiotsuka of Hitsujibungaku as guest vocal. Both songs were recorded in RAK Studio, London during Hometown UK/FR Tour in 2019.

== Release ==
The single was released on 7 October 2020. It released in three editions total, a standard CD-only edition, and two limited editions that come with a T-shirt which feature illustrations by Yusuke Nakamura. The physical single contains song called "Next", composed by their bassist Takahiro Yamada and was produced in a remote environment. Prior to the single's release, "Dialogue" and "Furetai Tashikametai" were premiered on Japanese radio, J-WAVE and InterFM897 respectively.

== Track listing ==
All lyrics are written by Masafumi Gotoh; all music is composed by Gotoh, except "Next" by Takahiro Yamada

CD
No.	Title	Length
1.	"Dialogue" (ダイアローグ Daiarōgu)	4:40
2.	"Furetai Tashikametai" (触れたい 確かめたい I Want To Touch You And Be Sure)	4:42
3.	"Next" (ネクスト Nekusuto)	3:28
Total length:		6:55

Digital download and streaming (Dialogue)
No.	Title	Length
1.	"Dialogue" (ダイアローグ Daiarōgu)	4:40
Total length:		4:40

Digital download and streaming (Furetai Tashikametai)
No.	Title	Length
1.	"Furetai Tashikametai" (触れたい 確かめたい I Want To Touch You And Be Sure)	4:42
Total length:		4:42

== Personnel ==
Adapted from the single liner notes.

Asian Kung-Fu Generation

- Masafumi Gotoh – vocals, guitars
- Kiyoshi Ijichi – drums
- Kensuke Kita – guitars, vocals
- Takahiro Yamada – bass guitar, synth bass, synthesizers vocals

Additional musicians

- Moeka Shiotsuka – vocals (track 2)
- Ryosuke Shimomura – synthesizers (track 1), synth bass arrange & soundmake (track 2)

Production

- Asian Kung-Fu Generation - recording (track 3)
- Isabel Gracefield – recording (track 1 & 2)
- Yosuke Inoue – engineering Kita's guitar (track 3)
- Kenichi Koga – mixing (track 3)
- Kenichi Nakamura – recording (track 1 & 2), mixing (track 1 & 2)
- Hiroshi Shiota - mastering

Artwork and design

- Yutaka Kimura – design
- Yusuke Nakamura – illustration

== Charts ==
Chart (2020)	Peak positions
Japanese Weekly Singles (Oricon)	9
Japan Top Singles Sales (Billboard)	6

== Release history ==
Region	Date	Label	Format	Catalog
Japan	7 October 2019	Ki/oon	CD	KSCL-3264
Japan	7 October 2019	Ki/oon	CD+T-shirt Type A	KSCL-3260
Japan	7 October 2019	Ki/oon	CD+T-shirt Type B	KSCL-3262
Various	7 October 2019	Ki/oon	Digital download; streaming	
