= Demachiyanagi Parallel Universe =

Single by Asian Kung-Fu Generation
- Released: 28 September 2022
- Length: 4:04
- Label: Ki/oon
- Songwriter: Masafumi Gotoh
- Producer: Asian Kung-Fu Generation

Asian Kung-Fu Generation singles chronology
"Empathy" (2021)	"Demachiyanagi Parallel Universe" (2022)	"Shukuen" (2023)

"Demachiyanagi Parallel Universe" (出町柳パラレルユニバース) is a song by the Japanese rock band Asian Kung-Fu Generation. The song was initially pre-released digitally on September 21, 2022, with the full single being released (digitally and physically) a week later on September 28, 2022. It is the opening theme to anime series The Tatami Time Machine Blues, a sequel to The Tatami Galaxy which the band also provided the opening theme for (Maigoinu to Ame no Beat).

The single also features a cover of the 1996 Weezer song "I Just Threw Out the Love of My Dreams", sung with AAAMYYY from Tempalay. The other B-sides include a duet between Gotoh and Kita for Oppama Feelin' Down, and an alternate version of the A-side called Yanagikōji Parallel Universe. Yanagikōji Parallel Universe is a continuation of the band's previous album Surf Bungaku Kamakura, where each track is named after a station on the Enoshima Electric Railway.

It is the first single from the band to include three new songs as B-sides since Blue Train.

== Music video ==
The music video for "Demachiyanagi Parallel Universe" was directed by Yoshiyuki Shimada. The video begins with an animation of the song's lyrics with Gotoh singing along, before transitioning to be in the same style of The Tatami Galaxy's (and Tatami Time Machine Blues) opening titles. The rest of the video features the band members inside the animated world of The Tatami Galaxy whilst dressed as characters from the anime.

== Track listing ==
All lyrics are written by Masafumi Gotoh except track 2.

CD
No.	Title	Lyrics	Music	Length
1.	"Demachiyanagi Parallel Universe" (出町柳パラレルユニバース)		Masafumi Gotoh	4:04
2.	"I Just Threw Out The Love Of My Dreams (with AAAMYYY)" (Cover, original song by Weezer)	Rivers Cuomo	Rivers Cuomo	2:48
3.	"Oppama Feelin' Down" (追浜フィーリンダウン)		Masafumi Gotoh and Kensuke Kita	3:22
4.	"Yanagikōji Parallel Universe" (柳小路パラレルユニバース)		Masafumi Gotoh	2:55
Total length:				13:09

Blu-ray - ASIAN KUNG-FU GENERATION 25th Anniversary Tour 2021 "Quarter-Century" at Zepp Tokyo 2021.11.22
No.	Title	Length
1.	"Jūni Shinhō no Yūkei" (十二進法の夕景; Evening Glow of Duodecimal)	5:13
2.	"Shinseiki no Love Song" (新世紀のラブソング)	5:51
3.	"Kōya wo Aruke" (荒野を歩け; Walk in the Wild Land)	4:47
4.	"Standard" (スタンダード)	4:26
5.	"Maigoinu to Ame no Beat" (迷子犬と雨のビート; A Lost Dog and Beats of the Rain)	5:01
6.	"Ima wo Ikite" (今を生きて; Living in the Now)	5:09
7.	"Empathy" (エンパシー)	5:09
Total length:		35:36

== Charts ==
Chart (2022)	Peak positions
Japanese Singles (Oricon)	9
Japanese Rock Singles (Oricon)	1

== Release history ==
Region	Date	Label	Format	Catalog	Notes
Worldwide	21 September 2022	Ki/oon	Digital download; streaming		Pre-release of A-side track "Demachiyanagi Parallel Universe"
Japan	28 September 2022	Ki/oon	CD	KSCL-3384	Full release of single, including B-side tracks
Japan	28 September 2022	Ki/oon	CD+BD	KSCL-3382	Full release of single, including B-side tracks
Various	28 September 2022	Ki/oon	Digital download; streaming		Full release of single, including B-side tracks
