= Sore dewa, Mata Ashita =

Single by Asian Kung-Fu Generation

from the album Landmark
- Released: July 25, 2012
- Genre: Indie rock, power pop
- Label: Ki/oon Records; KSCL-2077
- Songwriters: Masafumi Gotoh (Lyrics) Masafumi Gotoh; Takahiro Yamada (Music)
- Producer: Asian Kung-Fu Generation

Asian Kung-Fu Generation singles chronology
| "Kakato de Ai o Uchinarase" (2012) | "Sore dewa, Mata Ashita" (2012) | "Ima wo Ikite" (2013) |

"Sore dewa, Mata Ashita" (それでは、また明日, Well Then, See You Tomorrow) is a song by Japanese rock band Asian Kung-Fu Generation. It was released on July 25, 2012, and reached number 11 on the Oricon charts. It was used as the theme song for Road to Ninja: Naruto the Movie and one of the 4 songs by Asian Kung-Fu Generation used in Naruto media, alongside "Haruka Kanata", "Blood Circulator", and "Shukuen". The song was ranked 9th on fans request for the band's 10th anniversary live setlist on September 14, 2013.

A longer version of the song with an extended instrumental break is played during the credits of the film, and is included in Best Hit AKG 2.

== Music video ==
The music video features all activities in loop. Band members appear in different scenes; Gotoh rotate from left to right while singing, Kita playing guitar next to boy who throw baseball in repeat, Yamada playing bass in a room, and Ijichi playing drum with balls falling behind him.

== Track listing ==
All lyrics are written by Masafumi Gotō.

| No. | Title | Music | Length |
|---|---|---|---|
| 1. | "Sore dewa, Mata Ashita" (それでは、また明日 Well Then, See You Tomorrow) | Masafumi Gotoh, Takahiro Yamada | 3:43 |
| 2. | "Reizōko no Roku Demo Nai Joke" (冷蔵庫のろくでもないジョーク Senseless Refrigerator Jokes) | Masafumi Gotoh, Kiyoshi Ijichi | 3:04 |
| Total length: | | | 6:47 |

== Personnel ==
- Masafumi Gotō – lead vocals, rhythm guitar
- Kensuke Kita – lead guitar, background vocals
- Takahiro Yamada – bass, background vocals
- Kiyoshi Ijichi – drums
- Asian Kung-Fu Generation – producer

== Charts ==
| Year | Chart | Peak position |
|---|---|---|
| 2012 | Oricon | 11 |
| 2012 | Japan Hot 100 | 12 |
| 2012 | Japan Hot Animation | 2 |
