= Marching Band (Asian Kung-Fu Generation song) =

Single by Asian Kung-Fu Generation

from the album Best Hit AKG
- Released: November 30, 2011
- Studio: Landmark Studio
- Genre: Indie rock
- Length: 5:21
- Label: Ki/oon Records; KSCL-1880
- Songwriter(s): Masafumi Gotoh
- Producer(s): Asian Kung-Fu Generation

Asian Kung-Fu Generation singles chronology
"Maigoinu to Ame no Beat" (2010)	"Marching Band" (2011)	"Kakato de Ai o Uchinarase" (2012)

"Marching Band" (マーチングバンド, Māchingu Bando) is the 16th single of Japanese rock band Asian Kung-Fu Generation for their first best-of album Best Hit AKG. The single was released on November 30, 2011. The song "N2" is also featured on the album Landmark.

== Music video ==
The music video for "Marching Band" was directed by Sojiro Kamatani . The video features a school girl (Sasha Ueda) running towards a boy in slow motion and greet him.

== Track listing ==
All lyrics are written by Masafumi Gotoh; all music is composed by Masafumi Gotoh, except "Old School" by Takahiro Yamada

No.	Title	Length
1.	"Marching Band" (マーチングバンド Māchingu Bando)	5:21
2.	"N2"	3:06
3.	"Old School" (オールドスクール Ōrudo Sukūru)	3:05
Total length:		11:32

== Personnel ==
- Masafumi Gotoh – lead vocals, rhythm guitar
- Kensuke Kita – lead guitar, background vocals
- Takahiro Yamada – bass, background vocals
- Kiyoshi Ijichi – drums
- Asian Kung-Fu Generation – producer

== Charts ==
Year	Chart	Peak position
2011	Oricon	9
2011	Japan Hot 100	10

== Release history ==
Region	Date	Label	Format	Catalog
Japan	30 November 2011	Ki/oon	CD	KSCL-1880
