= Kakato de Ai o Uchinarase =

Single by Asian Kung-Fu Generation

from the album Landmark
- Released: April 11, 2012
- Studio: Landmark Studio
- Genre: Indie rock
- Length: 4:25
- Label: Ki/oon Records; KSCL-2002
- Songwriter(s): Masafumi Gotoh (Lyrics) Masafumi Gotoh; Kensuke Kita; (Music)
- Producer(s): Asian Kung-Fu Generation

Asian Kung-Fu Generation singles chronology
"Marching Band" (2011)	"Kakato de Ai o Uchinarase" (2012)	"Sore dewa, Mata Ashita" (2012)

"Kakato de Ai o Uchinarase" (踵で愛を打ち鳴らせ, Clicking My Heels To Love) is the 17th single of Japanese rock band Asian Kung-Fu Generation. The single was released on April 11, 2012. It was composed by Masafumi Gotoh and Kensuke Kita. It reached number 8 on the Oricon chart.

== Track listing ==
All lyrics are written by Masafumi Gotoh; all music is composed by Masafumi Gotoh and Kensuke Kita

No.	Title	Length
1.	"Kakato de Ai o Uchinarase" (踵で愛を打ち鳴らせ Clicking My Heels To Love)	4:25
2.	"Reload Reload" (リロードリロード Rirōdo Rirōdo)	1:52
Total length:		6:17

== Personnel ==
- Masafumi Gotō – lead vocals, rhythm guitar
- Kensuke Kita – lead guitar, background vocals
- Takahiro Yamada – bass, background vocals
- Kiyoshi Ijichi – drums
- Asian Kung-Fu Generation – producer
