= Fanclub (album) =

2006 studio album by Asian Kung-Fu Generation

Studio album by ASIAN KUNG-FU GENERATION
- Released: March 15, 2006
- Recorded: 2005–2006
- Genres: Indie rock; alternative rock
- Length: 50:47
- Labels: Kioon / Okami; KSCL-945
- Producer: Asian Kung-fu Generation

ASIAN KUNG-FU GENERATION chronology
Sol-fa (2004)	Fanclub (2006)	Feedback File (2006)

Singles from Fanclub
- 1. "Blue Train" Released: November 30, 2005; 2. "World Apart" Released: February 15, 2006

Professional ratings
Review scores
Source	Rating
AllMusic	4.5/5 stars
Sputnikmusic	4.0/5

Fanclub (ファンクラブ, Fankurabu) is the third studio album by Japanese rock band Asian Kung-Fu Generation, released on March 15, 2006. The album peaked at number three on Oricon charts and sold 253,137 copies by year's end, eventually becoming the 48th best selling album of the year. The album included two singles, "Blue Train," which reached number five on the charts, and "World Apart," which earned the band their first number-one single.

The album has received two vinyl releases, first on April 5, 2006 and a re-issue in September 16, 2026 featuring remastered audio and new alternate artwork by Yusuke Nakamura. The 2026 remaster was also released on streaming platforms from October 14, coinciding with the start of the album's 20th anniversary tour.

== Title meaning ==
The album title "fanclub" is derived from the members' disposition toward creativity, their desire to be devoted followers not only of rock, but every type of music and its unique aspects and capabilities. The title also reflects their wish for people to love and live with the music in everyday life.

== Track listing ==
All songs written and composed by Masafumi Gotō, except:

- "Blue Train," composed by Masafumi Gotō and Kensuke Kita.
- The piano intro in "Moonlight" is from Claude Debussy's Suite bergamasque (specifically Clair de Lune).

No.	Title	Length
1.	"Waltz in Code" (暗号のワルツ Angō no Warutsu)	4:25
2.	"World Apart" (ワールドアパート Wārudo Apāto)	4:29
3.	"Blackout" (ブラックアウト Burakkuauto)	5:19
4.	"Primrose" (桜草 Sakurasō)	3:53
5.	"Rabbit in the Back Alley" (路地裏のうさぎ Rojiura no Usagi)	2:47
6.	"Blue Train" (ブルートレイン Burū Torein)	4:19
7.	"Midwinter Dance" (真冬のダンス Mafuyu no Dansu)	3:25
8.	"Butterfly" (バタフライ Batafurai)	4:44
9.	"Senseless" (センスレス Sensuresu)	5:36
10.	"Moonlight" (月光 Gekkō)	6:22
11.	"Tightrope" (タイトロープ Taito Rōpu)	5:28
Total length:		50:47

=== B-sides ===
Song	Length	B-side of
"Road Movie"	4:23	"Blue Train"
"Tobenai Sakana"	2:57	"Blue Train"
"Gekkō"	6:21	"Blue Train"
"Eien ni"	3:09	"World Apart"
"Uso to Wonderland"	2:27	"World Apart"

== Personnel ==
- Masafumi Gotō – lead vocals, guitar, lyrics
- Kensuke Kita – lead guitar, background vocals
- Takahiro Yamada – bass, background vocals
- Kiyoshi Ijichi – drums, percussion, piano
- Asian Kung-Fu Generation – producer
- Kenichi Nakamura – mixing, recording
- Tofu Takayama – mixing, recording
- Yuya Suzuki – recording
- George Marino – mastering
- Yusuke Nakamura – art direction
- Emily Lazar – Remastering engineer (2026 remaster)

== Chart positions ==
=== Album ===
Year	Chart	Peak positions
2006	Oricon	3
2006	World Chart	7

=== Singles ===
Year	Song	Peak positions
Year	Song	Oricon
2005	"Blue Train"	5
2006	"World Apart"	1
