= Fujisawa Loser =

Single by Asian Kung-Fu Generation

from the album Surf Bungaku Kamakura
- Released: October 15, 2008
- Studio: Inning Recording Hostelry
- Genre: Alternative rock
- Length: 2:45
- Label: Ki/oon Records; KSCL-1279
- Songwriter(s): Masafumi Gotoh
- Producer(s): Asian Kung-Fu Generation

Asian Kung-Fu Generation singles chronology
| "Korogaru Iwa, Kimi ni Asa ga Furu" (2008) | "Fujisawa Loser" (2008) | "Shinseiki no Love Song" (2009) |

"Fujisawa Loser" (藤沢ルーザー) is the lead single of Japanese rock band Asian Kung-Fu Generation's fifth studio album, Surf Bungaku Kamakura, released on October 15, 2008. The single's b-side is a cover song from American rock band The Rentals.

== Music video ==
The music video for "Fujisawa Loser" was directed by Naoto Nakanishi. It received a nomination for best Conceptual Video at the 2009 SPACE SHOWER Music Video Awards. The highly conceptual PV explores the thoughts of a young musician who has just received a letter of employment once his job application is approved of. He now has to decide the path of his future and choose between two life choices: being a salaryman or being in a rock band. The decision is metaphorically portrayed as race in which the man is split into two personas–a salaryman and a guitar player–and races against himself to the goal at the end of the finish line.

The race is broken down into four stages, each of which contains unique obstacles for both contenders:

- First stage: The salaryman is forced to wade through an overly crowded train while the musician must play in a heavy rainstorm for an audience of merely two people.
- Second stage: The salaryman deals with excessive and exhaustive desk work that never seems to end while the musician and his band must hold a long tour, performing at numerous clubs each and every night to a small audience that fails to grow.
- Third stage: The salaryman must choose to start his own company, become company president, or become a CEO. When he runs through the second door he lands facefirst in a box of sand next to a dead salaryman who chose freelance. The musician has to compete with other artists for his major debut at increasingly famous stadiums with the Tokyo Dome at the top of a steep slope.
- Fourth stage: The salaryman has the opportunity to become CEO, but fails to grab his mantle when it comes to life and runs away. He is then chased off by a grim reaper with "fired" on its back. The musician is close to achieving a gold disc award but it floats away just beyond his reach before shattering to pieces. He is then chased around by a giant spiked orb with the word "stress" written on it.
- Conclusion: As the two near the finish line and their goal–a house and beautiful Caucasian wife–multiple men wearing black bodysuits with the word "anxiety" written on them tackle the two and try to prevent them from reaching the end. Finally, the two make it to the finish, only for the house to come to life and run off with the woman to a speedboat where her husband waits with a bouquet of roses. The two kiss and sail away, waving goodbye to the two bewildered men. The video concludes with the man staring blankly at his acceptance letter.

== Track listing ==
| No. | Title | Lyrics | Music | Length |
|---|---|---|---|---|
| 1. | "Fujisawa Loser" (藤沢ルーザー) | Masafumi Gotoh | Masafumi Gotoh | 2:45 |
| 2. | "Hello Hello" (with The Rentals) | Matt Sharp | Matt Sharp | 4:20 |
| Total length: | | | | 7:05 |

== Personnel ==
- Masafumi Gotō – lead vocals, rhythm guitar
- Kensuke Kita – lead guitar, background vocals
- Takahiro Yamada – bass, background vocals
- Kiyoshi Ijichi – drums
- Asian Kung-Fu Generation – producer
- Yusuke Nakamura – single cover art

== Charts ==
| Chart (2008) | Peak position |
|---|---|
| Oricon | 6 |
| Japan Hot 100 | 5 |
| Billboard Japan Adult Contemporary | 6 |
