= Mada Minu Ashita ni =

EP by ASIAN KUNG-FU GENERATION
- Released: June 11, 2008
- Recorded: 2008
- Genre: Indie rock, alternative rock
- Length: 22:38
- Label: Ki/oon; KSCL-1250
- Producer: Asian Kung-fu Generation

ASIAN KUNG-FU GENERATION chronology
World World World (2008)	Mada Minu Ashita ni (2008)	Surf Bungaku Kamakura (2008)

Professional ratings
Review scores
Source	Rating
Allmusic	4/5 stars

Mada Minu Ashita ni (未だ見ぬ明日に, "Into an Unseen Tomorrow") is the second major-label EP by Japanese rock band Asian Kung-Fu Generation, released on June 11, 2008. The mini-album features songs conceived around the time of the recording of their preceding full-length album, World World World.

== Track listing ==
All lyrics are written by Masafumi Gotoh; all music is composed by Masafumi Gotoh, except "Science Fiction" and "Mustang" by Gotoh and Takahiro Yamada

No.	Title	Length
1.	"Myakuutsu Seimei" (脈打つ生命 Pulsating Life)	3:29
2.	"Science Fiction" (サイエンスフィクション Saiensu Fikushon)	2:52
3.	"Mustang" (ムスタング Musutangu)	5:00
4.	"Shinkokyū" (深呼吸 Deep Breath)	3:54
5.	"Yūsetsu" (融雪 The Thaw)	3:27
6.	"Mada Minu Ashita ni" (未だ見ぬ明日に Into an Unseen Tomorrow)	4:01

== Personnel ==
- Masafumi Gotoh – lead vocals, guitar, lyrics
- Kensuke Kita – lead guitar, background vocals
- Takahiro Yamada – bass, background vocals
- Kiyoshi Ijichi – drums
- Asian Kung-Fu Generation – producer
- Yusuke Nakamura – art direction

== Chart positions ==
=== Album ===
Year	Chart	Peak positions
2008	Oricon	2
2008	World Chart	21

=== Songs ===
Year	Song	Peak positions
Year	Song	Japan Hot 100
2008	"Mustang"	15
