= Re:Re: =

Single by Asian Kung-Fu Generation

from the album Sol-fa 2016
- Released: March 16, 2016(new) October 2004(original)
- Recorded: June 2004
- Genre: Indie rock, alternative rock
- Length: 3:48 (2004 album version); 5:26 (2016 album version); 5:32 (Single version)
- Label: Ki/oon
- Songwriters: Masafumi Gotoh (Lyrics) Masafumi Gotoh; Takahiro Yamada (Music)
- Producer: Asian Kung-Fu Generation

Asian Kung-Fu Generation singles chronology
"Right Now" (2016)	"Re:Re:" (2016)	"Blood Circulator" (2016)

"Re:Re:" (pronounced ar-ee-ar-ee) is a song by Japanese rock band Asian Kung-Fu Generation from their second full-length studio album, Sol-fa, originally released in 2004. In 2016, Sol-fa was re-recorded and a new version of "Re:Re:" was released as the lead single on March 16, 2016. The 2016 version of "Re:Re:" was used as the opening for the anime Erased. The song was ranked 2nd on fans request for band's 10th anniversary live setlist on September 14, 2013.

In 2024, a cover of the song by Kessoku Band was used as the ending theme to the second part of the Bocchi the Rock! compilation film which was itself titled "Re:Re:", marking the second time the anime band has covered a song for the anime after "Korogaru Iwa, Kimi ni Asa ga Furu" was used for the TV series.

== Music video ==
The music video for "Re:Re:" was directed by Kazuyoshi Oku. The video features old music videos of the band mixed with footage of their live performance. In the end of the video, all the footage combines and creates the word "Re:Re:".

== Track listing ==
All lyrics are written by Masafumi Gotoh.

CD
No.	Title	Music	Length
1.	"Re:Re:"	Masafumi Gotoh, Takahiro Yamada	5:32
2.	"Time Traveler"	Kensuke Kita	2:54
Total length:			8:26

DVD
No.	Title	Length
1.	"Live Documentary@Plaza Condesa Mexico DF 2015.11.20 (TOUR 2015[WONDER FUTURE]-LATIN AMERICA) including "Easter" and "Re:Re:" live performance"	20:51
Total length:		20:51

== Charts ==
Chart (2016)	Peak positions
Japanese Singles (Oricon)	9
Japan Hot 100 (Billboard)	7
Japan Hot Animation (Billboard)	1
US World Digital Song Sales (Billboard)	19

== Awards and nominations ==
Newtype Anime Awards

Year	Nominee / work	Award	Result
2016	"Re:Re:"	Best Theme Song	5th place

== Release history ==
Region	Date	Label	Format	Catalog
Japan	16 March 2016	Ki/oon	CD	KSCL-2709
Japan	16 March 2016	Ki/oon	CD+DVD	KSCL-2707-8
