= Ima o Ikite =

Single by Asian Kung-Fu Generation
- Released: February 20, 2013
- Genre: Indie rock, power pop
- Length: 4:50
- Label: Ki/oon
- Songwriter(s): Masafumi Gotoh (Lyrics) Masafumi Gotoh; Kensuke Kita; Takahiro Yamada; Kiyoshi Ijichi (Music)
- Producer(s): Asian Kung-Fu Generation

Asian Kung-Fu Generation singles chronology
"Sore de wa, Mata Ashita" (2012)	"Ima o Ikite" (2013)	"Wake Up!" (2014)

Music video
- "Living in the Now" on YouTube

"Ima o Ikite" (今を生きて; lit. 'Living in the Now') is a song by Japanese rock band Asian Kung-Fu Generation. It was released as the single on February 20, 2013, and it was used as the theme song for the 2013 film, The Story of Yonosuke.

== Music video ==
The music video for "Ima o Ikite" was directed by The Story of Yonosuke's director, Shūichi Okita. The video features Kengo Kora as a college student (like in the film's story), living together with his friends. Band members appear in a cameo, where they and the college students look at an attractive girl. This is the second time Kora appeared in Asian Kung-Fu Generation's music video after "Shinseiki no Love Song".

== Track listing ==
All lyrics are written by Masafumi Gotoh.

CD
No.	Title	Music	Length
1.	"Ima o Ikite" (今を生きて Living in the Now)	Masafumi Gotoh, Kensuke Kita, Takahiro Yamada, Kiyoshi Ijichi	4:50
2.	"Kemono no Kemono" (ケモノノケモノ Beast of the Beast)	Masafumi Gotoh, Takahiro Yamada	4:04
Total length:			7:09

DVD
No.	Title	Length
1.	"Ima o Ikite" (music video)	5:35

== Charts ==
Year	Chart	Peak position
2017	Oricon	10
2017	Japan Hot 100	9

== Release history ==
Region	Date	Label	Format	Catalog
Japan	20 February 2013	Ki/oon	CD	KSCL-2193
Japan	20 February 2013	Ki/oon	CD+DVD	KSCL-2192
