= Maigoinu to Ame no Beat =

Single by Asian Kung-Fu Generation

from the album Magic Disk
- Released: May 26, 2010
- Genre: Alternative rock, big band
- Label: Ki/oon Records; KSCL-1580
- Songwriter(s): Masafumi Gotō
- Producer(s): Asian Kung-Fu Generation

Asian Kung-Fu Generation singles chronology
"Solanin" (2010)	"Maigoinu to Ame no Beat" (2010)	"Marching Band" (2011)

"Maigoinu to Ame no Beat" (迷子犬と雨のビート, A Lost Dog and Beats of the Rain) is the 15th single of Japanese rock band Asian Kung-Fu Generation from their album Magic Disk. The single was released on May 26, 2010. The first track is the main theme for the anime "Yojō-Han Shinwa Taikei" (The Tatami Galaxy), which features character design from Yusuke Nakamura, the same artist who illustrates their CD covers. Maigoinu to Ame no Beat is also their first song to feature brass instruments.

== Track listing ==
All lyrics are written by Masafumi Gotoh

CD
No.	Title	Music	Length
1.	"Maigoinu to Ame no Beat" (迷子犬と雨のビート A Lost Dog and Beats of the Rain)	Masafumi Gotoh	4:56
2.	"Ameagari no Kibou" (雨上がりの希望 Hope After the Rain)	Masafumi Gotoh, Takahiro Yamada	3:50
Total length:			7:09

== Personnel ==
- Masafumi Gotō – lead vocals, rhythm guitar
- Kensuke Kita – lead guitar, background vocals
- Takahiro Yamada – bass, background vocals
- Kiyoshi Ijichi – drums
- Asian Kung-Fu Generation – producer

== Charts ==
Year	Chart	Peak position
2010	Oricon	8
2010	Japan Hot 100	11

== Release history ==
Region	Date	Label	Format	Catalog
Japan	26 May 2010	Ki/oon	CD	KSCL-1580
