= Blood Circulator =

Single by Asian Kung-Fu Generation
- Released: July 13, 2016
- Genre: Indie rock, alternative rock
- Length: 3:43
- Label: Ki/oon
- Songwriter: Masafumi Gotoh
- Producer: Asian Kung-Fu Generation

Asian Kung-Fu Generation singles chronology
"Re:Re:" (2016)	"Blood Circulator" (2016)	"Kouya wo Aruke" (2017)

"Blood Circulator" (ブラッドサーキュレーター, Buraddo Sākyurētā) is a song by Japanese rock band Asian Kung-Fu Generation. It was released on July 13, 2016, and reached number 13 on the Oricon. It was used as the opening for the 21st season of the anime Naruto Shippuden and the third song by Asian Kung-Fu Generation in the Naruto media, after "Haruka Kanata" and "Sore dewa, Mata Ashita". Masafumi Gotō said, "The offer came to places where there was no song, no idea, no time, but I could not find a reason to refuse, I thought that I had to write down even while I was sleeping." Single's B-side, Hakkei, sung by band's guitarist, Kensuke Kita. This is the fourth time since Re:Re:'s B-side, "Time Traveller" in 2016.

== Music video ==
The music video for "Blood Circulator" was directed by Masaki Ōkita. At the beginning, video presented in black and red, with the band playing in a building. During bridge, the video presented normal and band playing in outside building. After that, they playing in a boxing ring and inside building again.

== Track listing ==
All lyrics are written by Masafumi Gotoh.

No.	Title	Music	Length
1.	"Blood Circulator" (ブラッドサーキュレーター Buraddo Sākyurētā)	Masafumi Gotoh	3:43
2.	"Hakkei" (八景 Eight Views)	Kensuke Kita, Takahiro Yamada	3:04
Total length:			6:47

== Charts ==
Year	Chart	Peak position
2016	Oricon	13
2016	Japan Hot 100	15
2016	Japan Hot Animation	4
