= Korogaru Iwa, Kimi ni Asa ga Furu =

2007 song by Asian Kung-Fu Generation

Single by Asian Kung-Fu Generation

from the album World World World
- Released: February 6, 2008
- Studio: Aobadai Studio; Landmark Studio
- Genre: Indie rock
- Length: 4:38
- Label: Ki/oon Records; KSCL-1207
- Songwriter: Masafumi Gotoh
- Producer: Asian Kung-Fu Generation

Asian Kung-Fu Generation singles chronology
"After Dark" (2007)	"Korogaru Iwa, Kimi ni Asa ga Furu" (2008)	"Fujisawa Loser" (2008)

"Korogaru Iwa, Kimi ni Asa ga Furu" (転がる岩、君に朝が降る, Rock'n Roll, Morning Light Falls on You) is a song by Japanese rock band Asian Kung-Fu Generation. It was released as the third and last single of their fifth studio album, World World World, on February 6, 2008.

In December 2022, the song was used as the ending for the final episode of anime Bocchi the Rock!, where it was covered by Kessoku Band from the series.

In June 2023, the song was selected as theme song to Television Kanagawa's broadcast of the Kanagawa qualifying tournament for the National High School Baseball Championship taking place in July.

== Writing ==
The song was written by Masafumi Gotoh after Asian Kung-Fu Generation's first overseas concert in South Korea in 2007. Before the concert, he worried about how audiences would react, considering history between Korea and Japan, but that feeling quickly disappeared when the audience enthusiastically sang along.

== Live performances ==
The song was first introduced by Gotoh during their performance at 2007 Monster baSH with him sang the first verse of the demo version. Then a full performance during Project Beef tour in late 2007.

The song was ranked 8th on fans request for band's 10th anniversary live setlist on September 14, 2013. In July 2024, they performed this song on YouTube channel The First Take.

== Music video ==
The music video for "Korogaru Iwa, Kimi ni Asa ga Furu" was directed by Kazuyoshi Oku. The music video primarily centers around a young boy planting and watching a seed sprout in flowerpot.

== Track listing ==
All lyrics are written by Masafumi Gotoh; all music is composed by Masafumi Gotoh.

No.	Title	Length
1.	"Korogaru Iwa, Kimi ni Asa ga Furu" (転がる岩、君に朝が降る Rock'n Roll, Morning Light Falls on You)	4:37
2.	"Enoshima Escalator" (江ノ島エスカー Enoshima Esukā)	2:39
Total length:		7:16

== Personnel ==
- Masafumi Gotoh – lead vocals, rhythm guitar
- Kensuke Kita – lead guitar, background vocals
- Takahiro Yamada – bass, background vocals
- Kiyoshi Ijichi – drums
- Asian Kung-Fu Generation – producer
- Yusuke Nakamura – single cover art

== Charts ==
Year	Chart	Peak position
2008	Oricon	6
