= Right Now (Asian Kung-Fu Generation song) =

2016 single by Asian Kung-Fu Generation for Pink and Gray

Single by Asian Kung-Fu Generation
- Released: January 6, 2016
- Genre: Indie rock, alternative rock
- Length: 4:28
- Label: Ki/oon
- Songwriter(s): Masafumi Gotoh (Lyrics) Masafumi Gotoh; Takahiro Yamada (Music)
- Producer(s): Asian Kung-Fu Generation

Asian Kung-Fu Generation singles chronology
| "Easter" (2015) | "Right Now" (2016) | "Re:Re:" (2016) |

"Right Now" is a song by Japanese rock band Asian Kung-Fu Generation. It was released as the single on January 6, 2016 and it was used as the theme song for the 2016 film, Pink and Gray. This is the second time the band didn't use Yusuke Nakamura's artwork on their single, instead they just used the simple artwork of pink and grey color to fit in with the film.

== Music video ==
The music video for "Right Now" was directed by Pink and Gray's director, Isao Yukisada. The video features Kaho as actress and the band playing in the middle of the film set.

== Track listing ==
All lyrics are written by Masafumi Gotoh; all music is composed by Masafumi Gotoh, except "Right Now" by Gotoh and Takahiro Yamada

CD
| No. | Title | Length |
|---|---|---|
| 1. | "Right Now" | 4:28 |
| 2. | "Eternal Sunshine" (永遠の陽光 Eien no Yōkō) (live) | 5:06 |
| 3. | "Shinkokyu" (深呼吸 Deep Breath) (live) | 5:13 |
| 4. | "Wonder Future" (ワンダーフューチャー Wandā Fuyūchā) (live) | 5:42 |
| Total length: | | 20:30 |

DVD
| No. | Title | Length |
|---|---|---|
| 1. | "Right Now" (music video) |
| 2. | "Right Now" (making of) |

== Charts ==
| Year | Chart | Peak position |
|---|---|---|
| 2016 | Oricon | 8 |
| 2016 | Japan Hot 100 | 22 |
