= Blue Train (Asian Kung-Fu Generation song) =

Single by Asian Kung-Fu Generation

from the album Fanclub
- Released: November 30, 2005
- Studio: Landmark Studio
- Genre: Indie rock, math rock, emo
- Length: 4:19
- Label: Ki/oon; KSCL-930
- Songwriters: Masafumi Gotoh (Lyrics) Masafumi Gotoh; Kensuke Kita (Music)
- Producer: Asian Kung-Fu Generation

Asian Kung-Fu Generation singles chronology
"Kimi no Machi Made" (2004)	"Blue Train" (2005)	"World Apart" (2006)

"Blue Train" (ブルートレイン, Burū Torein) is a song by Japanese rock band Asian Kung-Fu Generation. It was released as the first single of their third studio album, Fanclub, on November 30, 2005. The song entered the top five on the Oricon charts and sold well over 100,000 copies by 2006, becoming the 94th single of the year.

== Music video ==
The music video for "Blue Train" was directed by Kazuyoshi Oku. The PV premiered on the Gogoichi -Space Shower Chart Show- on November 13, 2005. It displays the band waiting at a metro station for a train. In 2006, the video earned AKG their third consecutive win at the SPACE SHOWER Music Video Awards when it won Best Group Video.

== Track listing ==
All lyrics are written by Masafumi Gotoh; all music is composed by Masafumi Gotoh, except "Blue Train" by Gotoh and Kensuke Kita.

No.	Title	Length
1.	"Blue Train" (ブルートレイン Burū Torein)	4:19
2.	"Road Movie" (ロードムービー Rōdomūbī)	4:24
3.	"Tobenai Sakana" (飛べない魚 Flightless Fish)	2:58
4.	"Gekkou" (月光 Moonlight)	6:21
Total length:		18:01

== Personnel ==
- Masafumi Gotō – lead vocals, rhythm guitar
- Kensuke Kita – lead guitar, background vocals
- Takahiro Yamada – bass, background vocals
- Kiyoshi Ijichi – drums
- Asian Kung-Fu Generation – producer
- Yusuke Nakamura – single cover art

== Charts ==
Year	Chart	Peak position
2005	Oricon	5
