= Shinseiki no Love Song =

Single by Asian Kung–Fu Generation

from the album Magic Disk
- B-side: "Shiro ni Somero"
- Released: December 2, 2009
- Recorded: 2009
- Studio: Landmark Studio
- Genre: Rock
- Length: 5:14
- Label: Ki/oon Records; KSCL-1510~KSCL-1511, KSCL-1512
- Songwriter: Masafumi Gotoh
- Producer: Asian Kung–Fu Generation

Asian Kung–Fu Generation singles chronology
"Fujisawa Loser" (2008)	"Shinseiki no Love Song" (2009)	"Solanin" (2010)

"Shinseiki no Love Song" (新世紀のラブソング; "Love Song of the New Century") is the 13th single of Japanese rock band Asian Kung-Fu Generation, released on December 2, 2009. There is a limited-edition version with a DVD.

== Track listing ==
All lyrics are written by Masafumi Gotoh.

CD
No.	Title	Music	Length
1.	"Shinseiki no Love Song" (新世紀のラブソング Love Song of New Century)	Masafumi Gotoh	5:14
2.	"Shiro ni Somero" (白に染めろ Let's Paint it White)	Masafumi Gotoh, Takahiro Yamada	3:46
Total length:			9:00

All lyrics are written by Masafumi Gotoh; all music is composed by Masafumi Gotoh, except "After Dark" by Gotoh and Takahiro Yamada.

DVD: Live at Jisan Valley Rock Festival 2009, Korea
No.	Title	Length
1.	"Yoru no Call" (夜のコール Yoru no Kōru)	6:36
2.	"After Dark" (アフターダーク Afutā Dāku)	3:19
3.	"Loop & Loop" (ループアンドループ Rūpu & Rūpu)	4:16
4.	"Rewrite" (リライト Riraito)	5:27
Total length:		18:21

== Personnel ==
- Masafumi Gotoh – lead vocals, rhythm guitar
- Kensuke Kita – lead guitar, background vocals
- Takahiro Yamada – bass, background vocals
- Kiyoshi Ijichi – drums
- Asian Kung-Fu Generation – producer
- Yusuke Nakamura – single cover art

== Charts ==
Year	Chart	Peak position
2009	Oricon	4
2009	Japan Hot 100	8
