= Nano–Mugen Compilation 2008 =

Nano-Mugen Compilation 2008

Compilation album by Various artists
- Released: July 9, 2008
- Genre: Alternative rock, Punk rock, Indie
- Length: 64:03
- Label: Ki/oon/Tsutaya Records; KSCL-1256

Nano-Mugen chronology
Nano-Mugen Compilation 2006 (2006)	Nano-Mugen Compilation 2008 (2008)	Nano-Mugen Compilation 2009 (2009)

ASIAN KUNG-FU GENERATION presents Nano–Mugen Compilation 2008 is a compilation album released by Asian Kung-Fu Generation on July 9, 2008, to advertise their seventh annual Nano-Mugen Festival held at the Yokohama Arena through July 20–21st. The album features one song from each of the sixteen groups, from Japan, United States, and United Kingdom, who performed at the festival.

== Track listing ==
1. "Natsuzemi" (夏蝉, Summer Cicada) – ASIAN KUNG-FU GENERATION
2. "Sayonara 90's" – Analog Fish
3. "Ato Jūbyō De" (あと10秒で, After 10 Seconds) – Art-School
4. "You Can't Have It All" – Ash
5. "Mr. Feather" – ELLEGARDEN
6. "All Time Lows" – Hellogoodbye
7. "Do the Panic" – Phantom Planet
8. "Across the Sky" – Space Cowboy
9. "Laurentech" – SPECIAL OTHERS
10. "My Friends" – Stereophonics
11. "Alibi" – STRAIGHTENER
12. "Semi-Charmed Life" – Third Eye Blind
13. "Parachute" – Shugo Tokumaru
14. "MASHitUP" – The Young Punx
15. "RIWO" – 8otto
16. "Punishment" – 9mm Parabellum Bullet

== Chart positions ==
=== Album ===
Year	Chart	Peak position
2008	Oricon	18

=== Songs ===
Year	Song	Peak position
Year	Song	Japan Hot 100
2008	"Natsusemi"	36
