= Nano–Mugen Compilation 2006 =

Nano-Mugen Compilation 2006

Compilation album by Various artists
- Released: July 5, 2006
- Genre: Rock, indie, punk
- Length: 45:49
- Label: Ki/oon Records (KSCL-998)

Nano-Mugen chronology
Nano-Mugen Compilation (2005)	Nano-Mugen Compilation 2006 (2006)	Nano-Mugen Compilation 2008 (2008)

Asian Kung-Fu Generation Presents: Nano–Mugen Compilation 2006 is a compilation album released by Asian Kung-Fu Generation on July 5, 2006, to advertise their sixth annual Nano-Mugen Festival. The album features one song from each of the twelve groups — seven Japanese bands, three American bands, and two English bands — who performed.

== Track listing ==
No.	Title	Artist(s)	Length
1.	"Jūni Shinhō no Yūkei" (十二進法の夕景; Evening Glow of Duodecimal)	Asian Kung-Fu Generation	4:40
2.	"Another Time/Another Story"	Beat Crusaders	4:25
3.	"Renai Spirits" (恋愛スピリッツ; Love Spirits )	Chatmonchy	4:45
4.	"Change"	Dream State	3:08
5.	"Stereoman"	Ellegarden	3:33
6.	"Dirty na Sekai (Put Your Head)" (ダーティーな世界 (Put your head); The Dirty World (Put Your Head))	Hige	3:35
7.	"Have You Ever Seen the Stars? (Shooting Star version)"	Mo'some Tonebender	5:39
8.	"Getting By"	The Rentals	2:55
9.	"Bubblegum"	Silver Sun	3:49
10.	"The Nowarist"	Straightener	2:19
11.	"I Am for You"	Waking Ashland	3:35
12.	"Wake Up, Make Up, Bring It Up, Shake Up"	The Young Punx	3:20

== Chart positions ==
=== Album ===
Year	Chart	Peak position
2006	Oricon	7
