= Dhira Bongs =

Indonesian singer (born 1993)

- Born: Nadhira Soraya Nasution; 20 May 1993 (age 33); Jakarta, Indonesia
- Other name: Dhira Bongs
- Occupations: singer; songwriter
- Musical career
- Genres: R&B; soul
- Instruments: Vocals; keyboard/piano; guitar
- Years active: 2014–present
- Label: Demajors

Nadhira Soraya Nasution, better known as Dhira Bongs (born 20 May 1993) is an Indonesian singer.

== Early life ==
Dhira was raised in a music-loving family. Her mother was an avid listener of musicians such as Barry White and Stevie Wonder; Dhira later cited the former as one of her musical inspirations, along with Brian May and Spice Girls. Her mother enrolled her in piano lessons from first to sixth grade. Later, in seventh grade, she switched to guitar lessons, which did not last long.

== Career ==
Dhira has been active in music since junior high school; along with her schoolfriends, she performed death metal and punk music as a guitarist. Later, she became the guitarist for a ska band before starting her solo career from 2009 to 2013. In 2014, he began her professional career by self-releasing her debut album, My Precious. She followed up with her second album, Head Over Heels, released in 2016 under Demajors; this was followed by a 2017 Japan tour. In 2019, she performed in SXSW as the sole Indonesian performer there. Her third album, A Tiny Bit of Gold in The Dark Ocean, was released on 23 September 2022.

== Discography ==
Albums

- My Precious (2014)
- Head Over Heels (2016)
- A Tiny Bit of Gold in the Dark Ocean (2022)

Singles

- "Walk In Time" (2023)

== Nominations and awards ==
Year	Award	Category	Nominee(s)	Result	Ref.
2023	Anugerah Musik Indonesia 2023	Best Contemporary R&B Male/Female Solo Artist	"At Least Once"	Nominated	
