= Nano–Mugen Compilation =

Nano-Mugen Compilation

Compilation album by Various artists
- Released: June 8, 2005
- Genre: Alternative rock, punk rock, indie
- Length: 28:22
- Label: Ki/oon Records (KSCL-827)

Nano-Mugen chronology
Nano-Mugen Compilation (2005)	Nano-Mugen Compilation 2006 (2006)

Asian Kung-Fu Generation Presents: Nano–Mugen Compilation is a compilation album released by Asian Kung-Fu Generation on June 8, 2005, to advertise their fifth Nano-Mugen Festival that was held at Yokohama Arena on July 9. The album features one song from each of the eight total groups, composed of four Japanese bands and four UK bands, who performed at the event.

== Track listing ==
No.	Title	Artist(s)	Length
1.	"Burn Baby Burn"	Ash	3:30
2.	"Blackout" (ブラックアウト)	Asian Kung-Fu Generation	5:21
3.	"I Love You 'Cause I Have To"	Dogs Die in Hot Cars	2:47
4.	"Bored of Everything"	Ellegarden	3:21
5.	"Tongue Tied"	Farrah	2:29
6.	"Sugar Bomb Baby"	Industrial Salt	3:49
7.	"Rock to Honey" (ロックとハニー; Rock and Honey)	Sparta Locals	3:59
8.	"White Room Black Star" (Stout version)	Straightener	3:05

== Chart positions ==
=== Album ===
Year	Chart	Peak position
2005	Oricon	7
