= Hōkai Amplifier =

EP by Asian Kung-Fu Generation
- Released: November 25, 2002 (original); April 23, 2003 (re-release)
- Recorded: 2002 at GOK Sound Studio in Tokyo, Japan
- Genres: Indie rock, alternative rock
- Length: 22:54
- Labels: Under Flower; FLOWER-047; Ki/oon; KSCL-542; Spectrum; SPJL-001
- Producer: Katsuhisa Ogawa

Asian Kung-Fu Generation chronology
I'm Standing Here (2001)	Hōkai Amplifier (2002)	Kimi Tsunagi Five M (2003)

Hōkai Amplifier (崩壊アンプリファー, Hōkai Anpurifā; Destructive Amplifier) is the major-label debut EP by Japanese rock band Asian Kung-Fu Generation, released on November 25, 2002, on Under Flower Records.

== Background ==
After six years since its inception and three independent releases, Asian Kung-Fu Generation contributed to the Under Flower compilation album, What You Gonna Do?, before dropping their first major-label EP. Due to its success, Hōkai Amplifier was re-released by Ki/oon Records on April 23, 2003. Although the mini-album didn't release any singles, the intro track "Haruka Kanata" enjoyed immense domestic and international popularity after it came to be used as the second opening theme for the anime series Naruto. In 2014, the album was released again as a 12-inch analog record.

== Track listing ==
All lyrics are written by Masafumi Gotoh; all music is composed by Masafumi Gotoh, except "Rashinban" by Gotoh and Takahiro Yamada.

No.	Title	Length
1.	"Haruka Kanata" (遥か彼方 Far Away)	4:02
2.	"Rashinban" (羅針盤 Compass)	2:32
3.	"Konayuki" (粉雪 Powder Snow)	3:46
4.	"Ao no Uta" (青の歌 Blue Song)	3:52
5.	"Sunday" (サンデイ Sandei)	4:03
6.	"12"	4:36
Total length:		22:51

== Personnel ==
- Masafumi Gotoh – lead vocals, guitar, lyrics
- Kensuke Kita – lead guitar, background vocals
- Takahiro Yamada – bass, background vocals
- Kiyoshi Ijichi – drums
- Kumiko Ishikawa – additional vocals
- Asian Kung-Fu Generation/Katsuhisa Ogawa – producer
- Jun-ya Iwata – engineering, mixing
- Masato Wantanabe – mixing
- Kazuhiro Yamagata – mastering
- Kanetsugu "Kan" Tanaka – directing
- Yusuke Nakamura/KAN – art direction

== Chart positions ==
Year	Chart	Peak positions
2002	High Line Records	1
2002	Oricon Indie	35
