= Kiyoshi Ijichi =

Japanese drummer (born 1977)

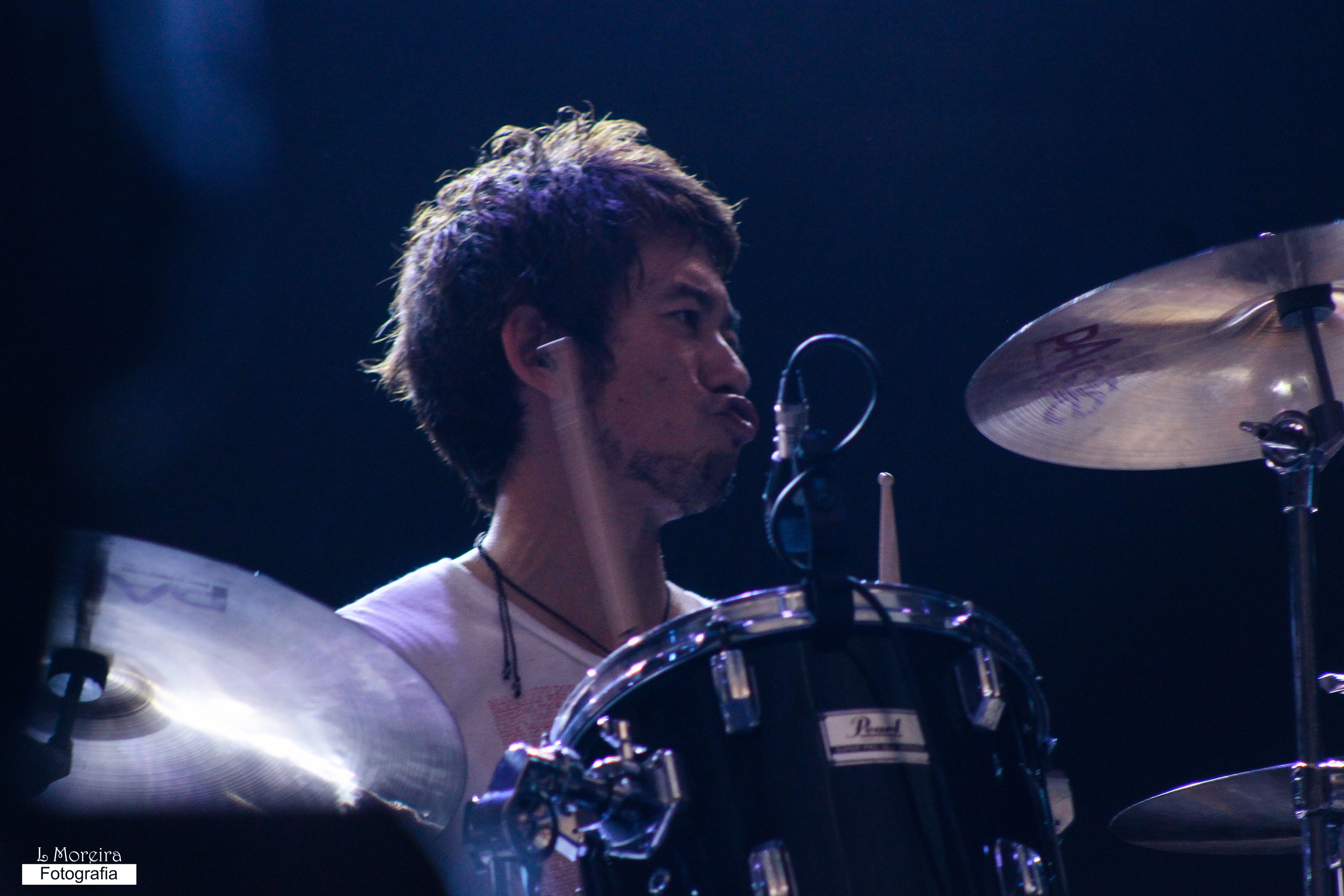
- Ijichi performing in 2017

Background information
- Born: Kiyoshi Ijichi; September 25, 1977 (age 48); Kamakura, Japan
- Origin: Tokyo, Japan
- Genres: Indie rock; alternative rock
- Occupation: Musician
- Instruments: Drums; piano
- Years active: 1996–present
- Labels: Ki/oon; Tofu
- Website: asiankung-fu.com

Kiyoshi Ijichi (伊地知 潔, Ijichi Kiyoshi) (born September 25, 1977) is the drummer of the Japanese rock band Asian Kung-Fu Generation, Name the Night, and instrumental band Phono Tones. Ijichi credits the origin of his drumming ability to playing in marching bands in junior high.

He met fellow band members Masafumi Gotoh, Kensuke Kita, and Takahiro Yamada while attending Kanto Gakuin University in 1996. Unlike the others, Ijichi had prior band experience and was a member of another college band when approached by the three. After parting ways with his old band, Ijichi joined Gotoh, Kita, and Yamada to form Asian Kung-Fu Generation and the four have been together ever since.

Aside from drumming, Ijichi is a skilled pianist and can be heard playing an excerpt of "Clair de Lune" from Debussy's Suite bergamasque for the intro of "Moonlight." He has a degree in engineering and his favourite bands are Brian Setzer, Link, King Bee and Hi-Standard. In comparison to his bandmates, Ijichi is fairly indifferent towards British alternative rock, instead preferring American and Japanese punk rock. He is the only member of the group who listens to heavy metal. Kiyoshi is a part of a small number of Japanese Christians.

Outside of music, Kiyoshi has a love of cooking and regularly hosts live cooking events. He also has his own cooking channel on YouTube and writes recipes. Additionally, he operates a food stall called "Kiyoshi's Kitchen" which makes appearances at various music festivals.

== Discography ==
=== Phono Tones ===
==== Studio albums ====
- Phono Tones has come! (2012)
- LOOSE CRUISE (2013)
- Along the 134 (2015)
- BUBBLE (2022)
- SHARE (2023)

=== Name the Night ===
==== Studio albums ====
- FULL MOON NIGHTS (2024)
