= Takahiro Yamada (musician) =

Musical artist (born 1977)

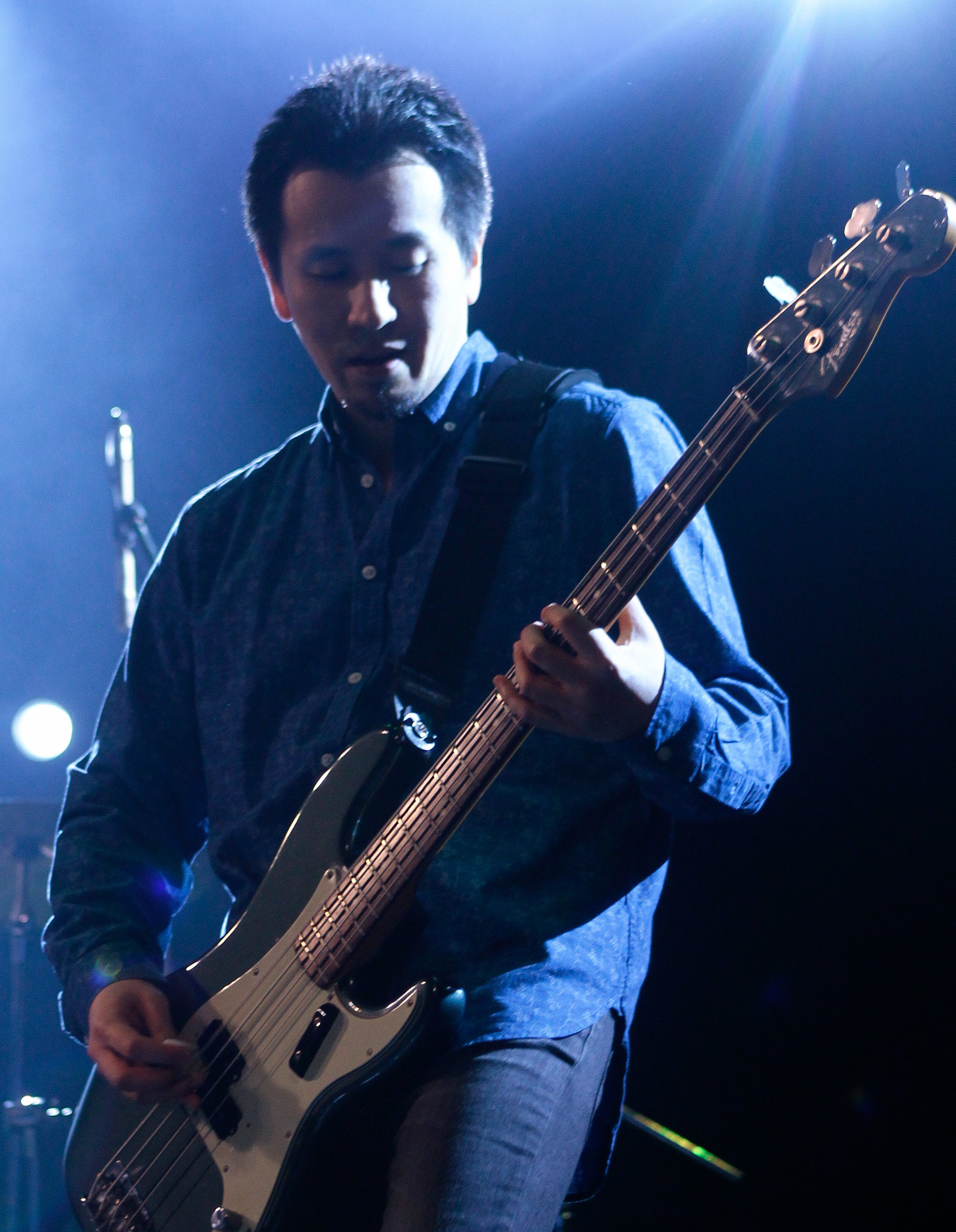

Background information
- Born: Takahiro Yamada; August 19, 1977 (age 48); Fujinomiya, Japan
- Origin: Chūbu, Japan
- Genres: Indie rock; alternative rock
- Occupations: Musician; singer; songwriter
- Instruments: Bass; vocals
- Years active: 1996–present
- Labels: Ki/oon; Tofu
- Member of: Asian Kung-Fu Generation
- Website: www.asiankung-fu.com

Takahiro Yamada (山田 貴洋, Yamada Takahiro; August 19, 1977) is a Japanese musician, best known for being the bassist for the Japanese rock band Asian Kung-Fu Generation.

== Music career ==
Yamada met fellow band members Masafumi Gotoh and Kensuke Kita while attending a music club of Kanto Gakuin University. The three formed Asian Kung-Fu Generation in 1996, with drummer Kiyoshi Ijichi joining the band shortly after.

While Gotoh is the main songwriter of the band, Yamada composed for songs such as After Dark, Re:Re:, Siren and Sore dewa, Mata Ashita.

Yamada also contributes to other musicians' projects. In 2014, he arranged a song for Rina Katahira, "HIGH FIVE" and performed together with his bandmate Kita. In 2021, he composed and arranged Nacherry's debut single "Fortune Teller" and performed together with his bandmate Ijichi.

== Personal life ==
Yamada has a degree in literature and his favourite bands are The Beatles, Oasis, The Smashing Pumpkins and Pet Shop Boys.

== Discography ==
=== Other ===
- Rina Katahira – "Baby" (2013) arranger
- Rina Katahira – Amazing Sky (2014) arranger on "HIGH FIVE", " CROSS ROAD", and "Hajimari ni"
- Gotch - "Vegetable" (2021) bassist
- Nacherry – Cherry Sunday (2021) bassist, composer and arranger on "Fortune Teller" and "Happy Nacherry Birthday"
- Nacherry – Now Loading (2022) arranger on "Brave?"
- Nacherry – "Kids Are Too Late" (2022) composer
- Kairi Yagi – "Metamorphose" (2022) bassist
