= Kensuke Kita =

Musical artist (born 1977)

Kensuke Kita 喜多建介
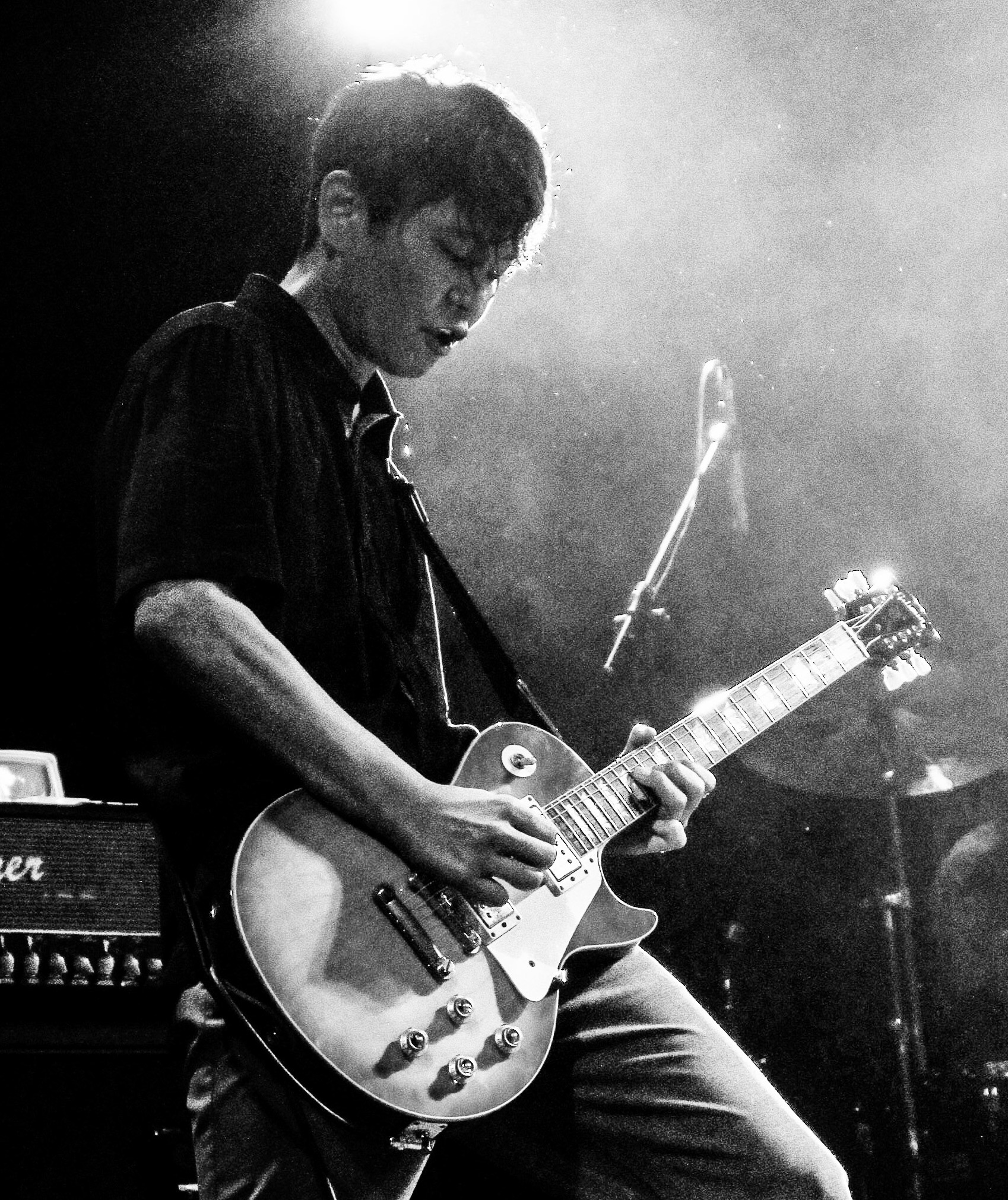

Background information
- Born: Kensuke Kita; January 24, 1977 (age 49); Yokohama, Japan
- Origin: Tokyo, Japan
- Genres: Indie rock; alternative rock
- Occupation: Musician
- Instruments: Guitar; vocals
- Years active: 1996–present
- Labels: Ki/oon; Tofu
- Website: asiankung-fu.com

Kensuke Kita (喜多 建介, Kita Kensuke) (January 24, 1977) is a Japanese musician, best known for being the lead guitarist for the rock band Asian Kung-Fu Generation. Kensuke met fellow band members Masafumi Gotō and Takahiro Yamada while attending a music club of Kanto Gakuin University. The three formed Asian Kung-Fu Generation in 1996, with drummer Kiyoshi Ijichi joining the band shortly after.

While he primarily performs as background vocals, he's sung lead vocals on many b-sides, such as "Uso to Wonderland", "Seaside Sleeping", "Time Traveler", "Hakkei", "Weather Report", and "Omatsuri No Ato". In 2026, he contributed lyrics for the first time, on the b-side of "Skins" called "Shioiri Nightfall", where he also sung lead vocals. He has a degree in economics and his favourite bands are Radiohead, Manic Street Preachers, XTC, Supergrass.
