= Masafumi Gotoh =

Musical artist (born 1976)

Masafumi Gotoh 後藤正文
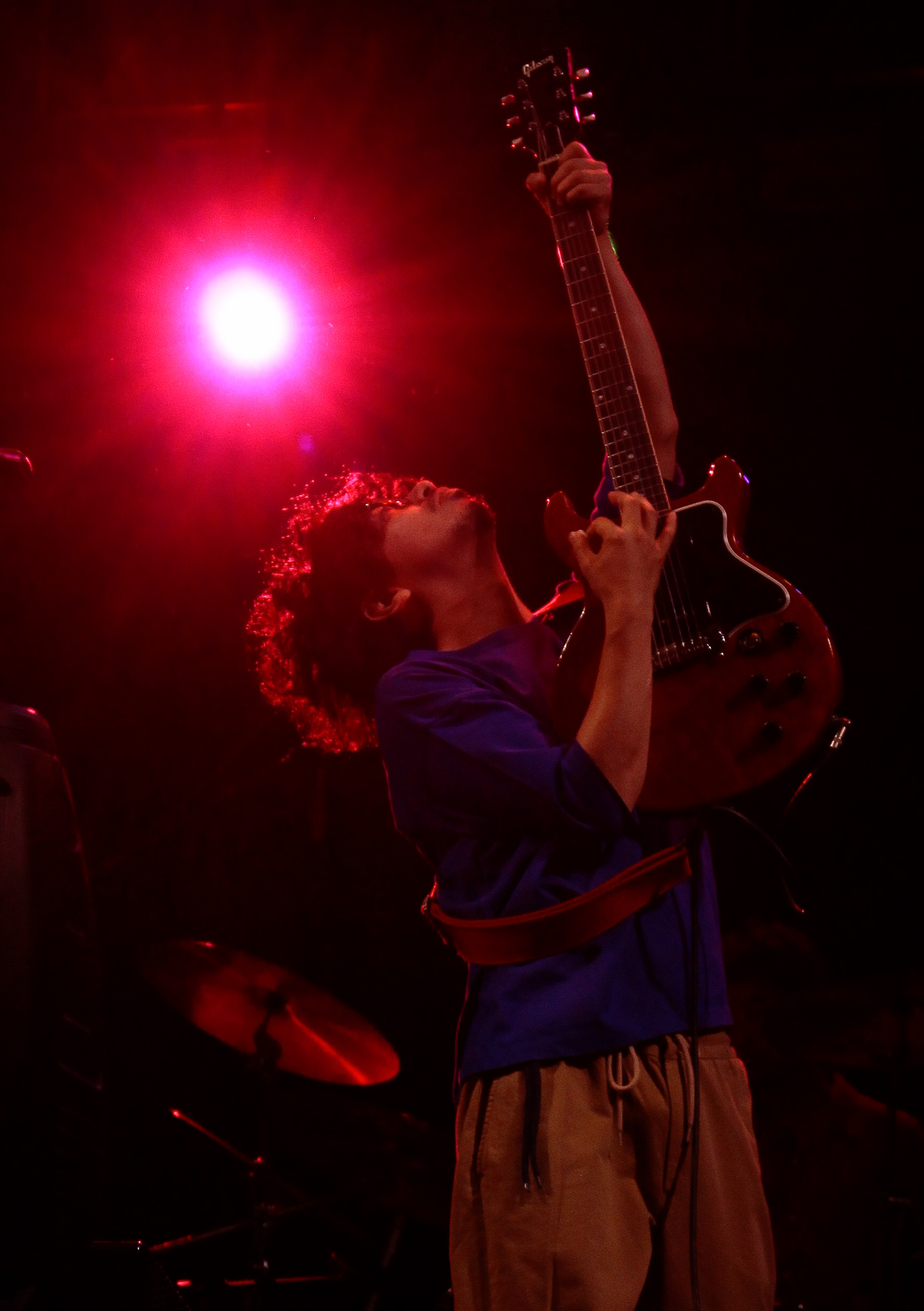
- Masafumi Gotoh in 2017

Background information
- Also known as: Gotch
- Born: December 2, 1976 (age 49); Shimada, Shizuoka, Japan
- Genres: Alternative rock; art rock; indie rock
- Occupations: Singer-songwriter; musician; producer; columnist
- Instruments: Vocals; guitar
- Years active: 1996–present
- Labels: Ki/oon; Tofu; only in dreams
- Website: Sony OID

Masafumi Gotoh (後藤 正文, Gotō Masafumi) or Gotch (December 2, 1976) is a Japanese singer-songwriter and musician, best known as the lead vocalist, guitarist, and primary songwriter for the rock band Asian Kung-Fu Generation. Masafumi met fellow band members Kensuke Kita and Takahiro Yamada while attending a music club of Kanto Gakuin University. The three formed Asian Kung-Fu Generation in 1996, with drummer Kiyoshi Ijichi joining the band shortly after. As the main songwriter of the band, Gotoh is credited with writing a majority of their lyrics, but has a strong tendency to share songwriting duties equally among his bandmates. His vocal style most often alternates between soft, melodic singing, and harder, harsher, yelling. Masafumi has a degree in economics and his favourite artists include Weezer, Number Girl, Oasis, Teenage Fanclub, and Beck. He produces records for other artists such as Chatmonchy, Dr. Downer and The Chef Cooks Me. He was also one of the founding members of the band Skeletons (スケルトンズ).

In 2010, Gotoh launched his own music label, only in dreams. In 2012, he started a solo project under the name Gotch, and released the single "'Lost". In 2014, he released his debut solo album, Can't Be Forever Young and released live album called, Live in Tokyo. In 2016, he released his second solo album, Good New Times, with most songs using English lyrics. In 2024, he established a non profit organization "Apple Vinegar Music Support" and is building a studio called "Music inn Fujieda" in Fujieda to support young and independent musicians. In March 2024, Gotoh released drone/ambient music album Recent Report I under his original name.

== Discography ==
=== Solo ===
==== Studio albums (as Gotch) ====
List of studio albums, with selected chart positions and certifications
Title	Details	Peak chart positions	
Title	Details	JPN Oricon	JPN Billboard
Can't Be Forever Young	Released: 30 April 2014; Label: only in dreams; Formats: CD, LP, download	14	—
Good New Times	Released: 13 July 2016; Label: only in dreams; Formats: download, CD, LP	25	47
Lives By The Sea	Released: 3 March 2021; Label: only in dreams; Formats: download, CD, LP	115	—

==== Studio albums (as Masafumi Gotoh) ====
List of studio albums, with selected chart positions and certifications
Title	Details
Recent Report I	Released: 27 March 2024; Label: only in dreams; Formats: Cassette, download, streaming

==== Live albums ====
List of live albums, with selected chart positions
Title	Details	Peak chart positions	
Title	Details	JPN Oricon	JPN Billboard
Live in Tokyo	Released: 3 December 2014; Label: only in dreams; Formats: CD, LP, download	85	—

==== Extended plays ====
List of extended plays
Title	Details
Goto to Togo (with Kiyomaru Togo)	Released: 10 May 2021; Label: only in dreams; Formats: Cassette, download

==== Singles ====
List of singles, with selected chart positions, showing year released and album name
Title	Year	Peak chart positions	Album
Title	Year	JPN Oricon	Album
"Lost"	2012	—	Can't Be Forever Young
"The Long Goodbye"	2013	—	Can't Be Forever Young
"Wonderland"	2014	48	Can't Be Forever Young
"Route 6"	2014	—	—
"Taxi Driver"	2017	—	Lives By The Sea
"Nothing But Love"	2020	—	Lives By The Sea
"Stay Inside" (featuring Mabanua)	2020	—	Lives By The Sea
"The Age" (featuring BASI, Dhira Bongs and Keishi Tanaka)	2020	—	Lives By The Sea
"Heaven" (with GuruConnect)	2023	—	Non-album singles
"Stateless" (featuring YonYon)	2024	—	Non-album singles
"Masa-masa (Japanese Ver.)" (Gotch and The Adams)	2025	—	

=== Other ===
- New Order – Waiting for the Sirens' Call (2005) lyrics on "Krafty (Japanese Version)"
- Dr. Downer – Rising (2011) music director
- Special Others – Special Others (2011) collaboration on "Dance in Tsurumi"
- Feeder – Generation Freakshow Japanese edition (2012) vocals on "Idaho"
- Chatmonchy – "Kirakira Hikare" (2012) producer; vocals on "Karisomethod"
- Chatmonchy – Henshin (2012) producer on "Yes or No or Love" and "Kirakira Hikare"
- Dr. Downer – Gensō no Maboroshi (2013) producer
- The Chef Cooks Me – Kaitentai (2013) producer, vocals on "Kanjōsen wa Bokura o Nosete"
- ART-SCHOOL – YOU (2014) producer
- Ovall - "Nadaraka Yoru" (2018) vocals
- The Mattson 2 – Vaults of Eternity: Japan (2018) vocals on "My Memories Fade"
- Co.Ruri Mito - MeMe (2019) music producer
- Nahavand – Vandalism (2019) producer, vocals on "Hold On"
- The Chef Cooks Me – "Kakato de Ai o Uchinarase" (2019) vocals
- SOFTTOUCH – "Jiyū Ishi" (2019) producer
- Aiha Higurashi – "Je t'aime" (2019) producer
- Aiha Higurashi – "Shining all over" (2019) vocals
- Manami Konishi – Cure (2020) producer and backing vocals on "Endless Summer", producer on "Ain't Nobody Know"
- FIRE EX. – "The Light" (2020) vocals
- Moment Joon – "Doukutsu" (2020) vocals
- The Rentals – "Goodbye, Steve" (2020) vocals
- SOCCER*SCHOOL - "last summer bleeze" (2021) mixing
- Moment Joon – "Distance" (2021) vocals
- Hironoi Momoi – "Fog" (2021) vocal, lyrics
- Lil Boom – "The End of the World" (2021) vocals
- Nahavand – "World Trigger"' (2022) recording
- Yuragi – For you, Adroit it but soft : Remixes & Rarities (2022) mastering
- The Tiva – On This Planet (2022) mastering
- Mofution Vibration – "Oboroge" (2022) mixing, mastering
- Dhira Bongs – A Tiny Bit of Gold in The Dark Ocean (2022) vocals on "Make Me Fallin In Love Again"
- Link – Tsuki no Hana EP (2023) producer, recording, mixing
- Jared Mattson – Peanut (2023) vocals on "Koko ni Kite"
- Kanjani Eight – "Ikiteru Bokura" (2023) songwriter
- Takehisa Chiba – "Spacewalker" (2023) vocals, vocals engineer, mixing
- Link – Taiyou to Tsuki no Beatniks (2023) producer, recording, mixing
- A Flood of Circle – Candle Songs (2024) producer on "Candle Songs"
- Furusato Osamu to Furoshiki – "Ryusui" (2024) co-producer, recording, mixing, mastering; guitar and chorus on "Ryusui"; lyrics, vocal, guitar, and programming on "Ryusui Remix"
- Furusato Osamu to Furoshiki – "Takibi" (2024) co-producer, recording, mastering
- Generations from Exile Tribe – "MY GENERATION" (2025) producer, guitar, lyrics, music
- SATOH – "MILE" (2025) featured vocals
