= Bocchi the Rock! discography =

- Logo of the series
- Studio albums: 1
- EPs: 2
- Soundtrack albums: 1
- Live albums: 2
- Compilation albums: 1
- Singles: 15
- B-sides: 2

The discography of the Japanese anime television series Bocchi the Rock! includes one studio album, two live albums, one compilation album, two EPs, and fourteen singles performed by Kessoku Band, a fictional rock band and the central group of the series. The band consists of lead guitarist and lyricist Hitori Gotō (voiced by Yoshino Aoyama), drummer and leader Nijika Ijichi (voiced by Sayumi Suzushiro), bassist and composer Ryō Yamada (voiced by Saku Mizuno), and guitarist and vocalist Ikuyo Kita (voiced by Ikumi Hasegawa). In recordings and live performances, the voice cast provides the vocals and a backing band, composed of drummer Osamu Hidai, bassist Yūichi Takama, and guitarists Akkin and Ritsuo Mitsui, plays the instruments.

Kessoku Band's eponymous debut studio album reached number one on the Billboard Japan Hot Albums chart and the Oricon Albums Chart. It topped the 2023 year-end digital album rankings of both publications and was certified platinum by the Recording Industry Association of Japan (RIAJ). "Seishun Complex", the opening theme of the anime, peaked at number 19 on the Oricon Singles Chart and 82 on the Billboard Japan Hot 100, and was certified gold for streaming by the RIAJ. Kessoku Band's second CD single "Into the Light" peaked at four on the Oricon Singles Chart and ten on the Japan Hot 100. A live album recorded from the band's Fixed Star concert debuted at number one on the Oricon Digital Albums Chart, and 19 on the Billboard Japan Hot Albums chart. Re:Kessoku Band, a six-track EP containing songs from the anime compilation films, was released on August 14, 2024. Their second EP, We Will, was released on September 6, 2024.

The anime's first and second Blu-ray and DVD volumes were bundled with Tomoki Kikuya's soundtrack to the series; it was later released for download and streaming on June 9, 2024. The fifth volume included "I'm the Only Ghost", a song performed in the tenth episode by the fictional band Sick Hack, with vocals by Sayaka Senbongi as the character Kikuri Hiroi; the song debuted on digital platforms on August 11, 2024.

== Albums ==
=== Studio albums ===
List of studio albums, showing selected details, selected chart positions, sales, and certifications
Title	Details	Peak chart positions			Sales	Certifications
Title	Details	JPN	JPN Comb.	JPN Hot	Sales	Certifications
Kessoku Band (結束バンド)	Released: December 25, 2022; Label: Aniplex; Formats: CD, LP, cassette, digital download, streaming	1	1	1	JPN: 245,910 (physical); JPN: 76,336 (digital)	RIAJ: Platinum

=== Live albums ===
List of live albums, showing selected details and chart positions
Title	Details	Peak chart positions	
Title	Details	JPN Dig.	JPN Hot
Kessoku Band Concert: Fixed Star at Zepp Haneda (Tokyo) (結束バンドLIVE-恒星- at Zepp Haneda (TOKYO))	Released: January 18, 2024; Label: Aniplex; Formats: Digital download, streaming	1	19
Kessoku Band Tour "We Will B" (結束バンド TOUR "We will B")	Released: October 8, 2025; Label: Aniplex; Formats: Digital download, streaming	6	— (Note: Kessoku Band Tour "We Will B" did not enter the Billboard Japan Hot Albums chart, but peaked at number nine on the Download Albums chart.)
"—" denotes an album that did not chart.

=== Soundtrack albums ===
List of soundtrack albums, showing selected details and chart positions
Title	Details	Peak chart positions	
Title	Details	JPN Dig.	JPN Hot
TV Anime "Bocchi the Rock!" Original Soundtrack (TVアニメ「ぼっち・ざ・ろっく!」オリジナルサウンドトラック)	Released: June 9, 2024; Label: Aniplex; Formats: Digital download, streaming	33	78

=== Compilation albums ===
List of compilation albums, showing selected details, chart positions, and sales
Title	Details	Peak chart positions			Sales
Title	Details	JPN	JPN Comb.	JPN Hot	Sales
Kirara Tribute Collection "Kessoku Band no Utattemita" (きらら トリビュート コレクション「結束バンドの歌ってみた」)	Released: December 25, 2024; Label: Aniplex; Formats: CD, digital download, streaming	10	10	— (Note: Kirara Tribute Collection "Kessoku Band no Utattemita" did not enter the Billboard Japan Hot Albums chart, but peaked at number one on the Download Albums chart.)	JPN: 15,976
"—" denotes an album that did not chart.

== Extended plays ==
List of extended plays, showing selected details, chart positions, and sales
Title	Details	Peak chart positions			Sales
Title	Details	JPN	JPN Comb.	JPN Hot	Sales
Re:Kessoku Band (Re:結束バンド)	Released: August 14, 2024; Label: Aniplex; Formats: CD, LP, (Note: Re:Kessoku Band's LP release includes tracks from the "Into the Light" single and the We Will EP.) digital download, streaming	2	2	2	JPN: 50,337
We Will	Released: September 6, 2024; Label: Aniplex; Formats: CD, digital download, streaming	7	7	7	JPN: 39,319

== Singles ==
=== CD singles ===
List of CD singles, showing year released, selected chart positions, sales, certifications, and associated album
Title	Year	Peak chart positions			Sales	Certifications	Album
Title	Year	JPN	JPN Comb.	JPN Hot	Sales	Certifications	Album
"Seishun Complex" (青春コンプレックス, Seishun Konpurekkusu)	2022	19	37	82	JPN: 26,341 (physical); JPN: 46,458 (digital)	RIAJ: Gold (streaming)	Kessoku Band
"Into the Light" (光の中へ, Hikari no Naka e)	2023	4	4	10	JPN: 51,535 (physical); JPN: 15,855 (digital)		Non-album single

=== Digital singles ===
List of digital singles, showing year released, selected chart positions, certifications, and associated album
Title	Year	Peak chart positions		Certifications	Album
Title	Year	JPN Dig.	JPN Hot	Certifications	Album
"Distortion!!"	2022	33	— (Note: "Distortion!!" did not enter the Billboard Japan Hot 100, but peaked at number 18 on the Heatseekers Songs chart.)		Kessoku Band
"Karakara" (カラカラ)	2022	16	— (Note: "Karakara" did not enter the Billboard Japan Hot 100, but peaked at number 16 on the Heatseekers Songs chart.)		Kessoku Band
"Guitar, Loneliness and Blue Planet" (ギターと孤独と蒼い惑星, Gitā to Kodoku to Aoi Hoshi)	2022	5	59	RIAJ: Gold (streaming)	Kessoku Band
"That Band" (あのバンド, Ano Bando)	2022	4	64		Kessoku Band
"What Is Wrong With" (なにが悪い, Nani ga Warui)	2022	9	— (Note: "What Is Wrong With" did not enter the Billboard Japan Hot 100, but peaked at number 20 on the Heatseekers Songs chart.)		Kessoku Band
"Never Forget" (忘れてやらない, Wasurete Yaranai)	2022	16	85		Kessoku Band
"If I Could Be a Constellation" (星座になれたら, Seiza ni Naretara)	2022	7	52	RIAJ: Gold (streaming)	Kessoku Band
"Rockn' Roll, Morning Light Falls on You" (転がる岩、君に朝が降る, Korogaru Iwa, Kimi ni Asa ga Furu)	2022	18	— (Note: "Rockn' Roll, Morning Light Falls on You" did not enter the Billboard Japan Hot 100, but peaked at number 20 on the Download Songs chart.)		Kessoku Band
"Shine as Usual" (月並みに輝け, Tsukinami ni Kagayake)	2024	6 (Note: As a double A-side single, "Shine as Usual" and "Now, I'm Going from Underground" also peaked at number 38 on the Combined Singles Chart.)	69		Re:Kessoku Band
"Now, I'm Going from Underground" (今、僕、アンダーグラウンドから, Ima, Boku, Andāguraundo kara)	2024	10	— (Note: "Now, I'm Going from Underground" did not enter the Billboard Japan Hot 100, but peaked at number 11 on the Download Songs chart.)		Re:Kessoku Band
"Doppelganger" (ドッペルゲンガー, Dopperugengā)	2024	11	— (Note: "Doppelganger" did not enter the Billboard Japan Hot 100, but peaked at number six on the Download Songs chart.)		Re:Kessoku Band
"Re:Re:"	2024	12	— (Note: "Re:Re:" did not enter the Billboard Japan Hot 100, but peaked at number 13 on the Download Songs chart.)		Re:Kessoku Band
"I'm the Only Ghost" (ワタシダケユウレイ, Watashi Dake Yūrei) (Note: Credited to Sick Hack)	2024	17	— (Note: "I'm the Only Ghost" did not enter the Billboard Japan Hot 100, but peaked at number 16 on the Download Songs chart.)		Non-album single
"—" denotes a single that did not chart.

== Other charted songs ==
List of other charted songs, showing year released, selected chart positions, and associated album
Title	Year	Peak chart positions		Album
Title	Year	JPN Dig.	JPN Hot	Album
"Hitoribocchi Tokyo" (ひとりぼっち東京)	2022	41	— (Note: "Hitoribocchi Tokyo" did not enter the Billboard Japan Hot 100, but peaked at number 48 on the Download Songs chart.)	"Seishun Complex" (single) (Note: Included as a B-side); Kessoku Band
"Secret Base" (ひみつ基地, Himitsu Kichi)	2022	—	— (Note: "Secret Base" did not enter the Billboard Japan Hot 100, but peaked at number 49 on the Download Songs chart.)	Kessoku Band
"I Can't Sing a Love Song" (ラブソングが歌えない, Rabu Songu ga Utaenai)	2022	—	— (Note: "I Can't Sing a Love Song" did not enter the Billboard Japan Hot 100, but peaked at number 53 on the Download Songs chart.)	Kessoku Band
"The Little Sea" (小さな海, Chiisana Umi)	2022	—	— (Note: "The Little Sea" did not enter the Billboard Japan Hot 100, but peaked at number 52 on the Download Songs chart.)	Kessoku Band
"Flashbacker" (フラッシュバッカー, Furasshubakkā)	2022	48	— (Note: "Flashbacker" did not enter the Billboard Japan Hot 100, but peaked at number 46 on the Download Songs chart.)	Kessoku Band
"Blue Spring and Western Sky" (青い春と西の空, Aoi Haru to Nishi no Sora)	2023	4	70	"Into the Light" (single)
"Me and the Three Primary Colors" (僕と三原色, Boku to Sangenshoku)	2024	7	— (Note: "Me and the Three Primary Colors" did not enter the Billboard Japan Hot 100, but peaked at number nine on the Download Songs chart.)	Re:Kessoku Band
"Chronostasis" (秒針少女, Byōshin Shōjo)	2024	9	— (Note: "Chronostasis" did not enter the Billboard Japan Hot 100, but peaked at number 12 on the Download Songs chart.)	Re:Kessoku Band
"Milky Way"	2024	—	— (Note: "Milky Way" did not enter the Billboard Japan Hot 100, but peaked at number 100 on the Download Songs chart.)	We Will
"Planet" (Note: Also known as "Wandering Star") (惑う星, Madō Hoshi)	2024	—	— (Note: "Planet" did not enter the Billboard Japan Hot 100, but peaked at number 85 on the Download Songs chart.)	We Will
"—" denotes a song that did not chart.

== Additional music ==
List of additional music, showing release dates and other notes
Title	Release date	Notes	Ref.
Kessoku Band Extra Music 1	February 22, 2023	Contains the instrumentals of "Distortion!!", "Karakara", and "That Band" (street live version), and the anime version of "Guitar, Loneliness and Blue Planet"; Bundled with the anime's third Blu-ray and DVD volume	
Kessoku Band Extra Music 2	March 22, 2023	Contains the instrumental and anime version of "That Band" and the instrumental of "What Is Wrong With"; Bundled with the anime's fourth Blu-ray and DVD volume	
Kessoku Band Extra Music 3	May 24, 2023	Contains the instrumentals and anime versions of "Never Forget" and "If I Could Be a Constellation", and the instrumental of "Rockn' Roll, Morning Light Falls on You"; Bundled with the anime's sixth Blu-ray and DVD volume	

== Videography ==
=== Concert videos ===
List of concert videos, showing selected details, chart positions, and sales
Title	Details	Peak chart positions		Sales
Title	Details	JPN BD	JPN DVD	Sales
Kessoku Band Concert: Fixed Star (結束バンドLIVE-恒星-)	Released: November 22, 2023; Label: Aniplex; Formats: Blu-ray, DVD	3	6	JPN: 11,834 (BD); JPN: 2,103 (DVD)
Kessoku Band Tour "We Will B" (結束バンド TOUR "We will B")	Released: October 8, 2025; Label: Aniplex; Formats: Blu-ray, DVD	1	10	JPN: 7,615 (BD); JPN: 599 (DVD)

=== Lyric videos ===
List of lyric videos, showing year released and directors/editors
Title	Year	Director(s) / editor(s)	Ref.
"Guitar, Loneliness and Blue Planet"	2022	Maruichi	
"That Band"	2022	Kaito	
"Never Forget"	2022	Akito Nakayama	
"If I Could Be a Constellation"	2022	Akito Nakayama	
"Into the Light"	2023	Akito Nakayama	
"Shine as Usual"	2024	Akito Nakayama	
"Doppelganger"	2024	Akito Nakayama	
"Me and the Three Primary Colors"	2024	Toshitaka Shinoda	
