= List of Bocchi the Rock! episodes =

Bocchi the Rock! is a Japanese anime television series based on the four-panel manga series Bocchi the Rock! by Aki Hamazi. Announced in February 2021, it was produced by CloverWorks and directed by Keiichirō Saitō, with Yūsuke Yamamoto serving as assistant director, Erika Yoshida writing the series' scripts, Kerorira designing the characters, and Tomoki Kikuya composing the music. Bocchi the Rock! follows the socially anxious Hitori Gotō as she joins Kessoku Band and fulfills her dream of performing live. The main voice cast consists of Yoshino Aoyama as Hitori, Sayumi Suzushiro as Nijika Ijichi, Saku Mizuno as Ryō Yamada, and Ikumi Hasegawa as Ikuyo Kita.

The series aired on Tokyo MX and other channels from October 9 to December 25, 2022. (Note: Tokyo MX listed the air dates for the series as Saturday at 24:00, which is effectively Sunday at midnight JST.) It consists of 12 episodes, with the episode titles being parodies of songs by the rock band Asian Kung-Fu Generation. Crunchyroll licensed the series for streaming outside of Asia. Plus Media Networks Asia licensed the series in Southeast Asia and released it on Aniplus Asia and Bilibili. Kessoku Band performed the opening theme "Seishun Complex" (青春コンプレックス; lit. 'Youth Complex'), as well as the ending themes "Distortion!!" for episodes 1–3, (Note: Ikumi Hasegawa, as the character Ikuyo Kita, provided the vocals for "Seishun Complex" and "Distortion!!".) "Karakara" (カラカラ) for episodes 4–7, (Note: Saku Mizuno, as the character Ryō Yamada, provided the vocals for "Karakara".) "What Is Wrong With" (なにが悪い, Nani ga Warui) for episodes 8–11, (Note: Sayumi Suzushiro, as the character Nijika Ijichi, provided the vocals for "What Is Wrong With".) and a cover version of Asian Kung-Fu Generation's "Rockn' Roll, Morning Light Falls on You" (転がる岩、君に朝が降る, Korogaru Iwa, Kimi ni Asa ga Furu) for episode 12. (Note: Yoshino Aoyama, as the character Hitori Gotō, provided the vocals for "Rockn' Roll, Morning Light Falls on You".)

A second season was announced at Kessoku Band's "We Will B" live event in February 2025. Yūsuke Yamamoto will direct the season, while Keito Oda will serve as character designer with Kerorira.

A new film, titled Eiga Bocchi the Rock! Hoshi no Ashiato (映画ぼっち・ざ・ろっく！ 星のあしあと; Bocchi the Rock! The Movie: Starry Footprints), was announced on November 1, 2026. It adapts a prequel story from the manga's fifth volume and focuses on the Ijichi sisters. It is directed by Shin Wakabayashi based on a screenplay by Erika Yoshida, with character designs by Yukiko Horiguchi. The film is scheduled to be released in Japan by Animec in 2027.

Aniplex compiled the first season into six volumes in Blu-ray and DVD formats, released from December 2022 to May 2023. Crunchyroll released the season as a single Blu-ray volume in North America on January 30, 2024, and in the United Kingdom on May 12, 2025. In Australia, Madman Entertainment released a Blu-ray of the season on March 6, 2024.

== Episodes ==
Bocchi the Rock! episodes
No.	Title (Note: All English titles are taken from Crunchyroll.)	Directed by	Storyboarded by	Original release date
1	"Lonely Rolling Bocchi"; Transliteration: "Korogaru Botchi" (Japanese: 転がるぼっち)	Keiichirō Saitō	Keiichirō Saitō	October 9, 2022
Hitori Gotō is an extremely introverted girl who has trouble with social interactions. When she sees a rock band being interviewed on TV, she decides to start playing guitar, thinking it will make her popular. Unfortunately, she remains lonely throughout middle school, but she finds some success playing covers of popular songs and posting them online under the alias "Guitarhero". After struggling to be sociable during her first month of high school, Nijika Ijichi, leader of "Kessoku Band" (Note: Kessoku Band (結束バンド) combines the literal meaning of "zip tie" with the figurative meaning of "unity" and "band".) finds her alone in a playground and begs her to fill in for the band's guitarist who suddenly quit before the performance. Hitori follows Nijika to an underground live house named "Starry" in Shimokitazawa and meets the band's bassist, Ryō Yamada. Despite playing poorly at the live show, Hitori is glad that the others gave her the nickname "Bocchi" (Note: The name is a reference to hitoribocchi (一人ぼっち), a term for being alone.), and that they are fans of her online (though they are unaware Hitori is Guitarhero). However, Hitori races home shortly after the show, feeling exhausted from the various social interactions that day. She also vows to get over her social anxiety one day so she can bring out her true self.
2	"See You Tomorrow"; Transliteration: "Mata Ashita" (Japanese: また明日)	Yoshiyuki Fujiwara	Keiichirō Saitō	October 16, 2022
During one of Kessoku Band's first meetings, Nijika points out that the band still lacks a vocalist and has little money to cover the charges needed to perform in a live house. Hitori initially is extremely reluctant to work, but eventually caves in and agrees to work at the same live house they performed at, as Nijika's older sister Seika is the manager there. Hitori tries to give herself a cold to avoid having to work, but ends up healthy enough to go anyway. She initially feels unease at serving drinks to customers; but with Nijika's encouragement and watching another band perform, Hitori resolves to change herself, and for the first time, she is able to look customers in the eye when serving them. She is excited to return the next day, but she suffers a cold for real.
3	"Be Right There"; Transliteration: "Hase Sanzu" (Japanese: 馳せサンズ)	Yūsuke Yamamoto	Yūsuke Yamamoto	October 23, 2022
During lunch break, Hitori overhears about a student named Ikuyo Kita who used to be a vocalist and guitarist in a band, and attempts to recruit her. She panics and runs off, and then begins playing her guitar which catches Kita's attention. Kita then confesses that she actually cannot play the guitar, and requests Hitori's help to learn it. However, as the two of them travel to Shimokitazawa, they run into Nijika and Ryō, where Hitori realizes Kita was actually the previously mentioned "runaway guitarist". Kita helps out at the live house as an apology. She also confides to Hitori that she has a crush on Ryō and joined the band on impulse to be close to her. Kita does not think she can join the band after running away before, but as Hitori had found out that she had been secretly practicing the guitar, she and the girls encourage her to join the band again. Kita then begins to learn guitar from Hitori.
4	"Jumping Girl(s)"; Transliteration: "Janpingu Gāru(zu)" (Japanese: ジャンピングガール(ズ))	Nobuhide Kariya	Nobuhide Kariya	October 30, 2022
Hitori is tasked with writing lyrics to a new original song. However, she struggles to come up with any ideas, and believes that her gloomy lyrics are not fit for the band. The next day, Nijika gathers the band for a promotional group photo shoot to give the band a stronger identity. Later, Hitori seeks advice from Ryō on her current lyrics. Ryō then told her about how she had quit her previous band because she felt they were selling out to chase popular trends, which had caused her to lose her individuality. She reminds Hitori that a song lyrics should reflects the writer's own unique personality. In the end, the lyrics Hitori wrote are well received by Ryō and others.
5	"Flightless Fish"; Transliteration: "Tobenai Sakana" (Japanese: 飛べない魚)	Yūsuke Kawakami	Yūsuke Kawakami	November 6, 2022
To be able to perform at Starry, the band needs to improve to meet the standards set by Seika, which Nijika notes that Seika wants to see their growth as a band. As Hitori reflects on the band's growth and why she wanted to join a band, she realizes that her dream was never to become popular on her own, but to see all four members succeed together. The band passes the audition with the performance of "Guitar, Loneliness and Blue Planet", where Hitori shows a glimpse of her true guitar skill. Hitori is wracked with fear after hearing that she will have to personally sell at least five tickets for the live show.
6	"Eight Views"; Transliteration: "Hakkei" (Japanese: 八景)	Yoshiyuki Fujiwara	Yoshiyuki Fujiwara	November 13, 2022
Hitori faces a difficult task after realizing that the only people close to her who can buy her tickets are her parents; her pride prevents her from asking for their help to sell the others. As she sits in a park in a state of melancholy, an alcoholic woman, Kikuri Hiroi, stumbles by; in the conversation that follows, she reveals that she plays the bass for another band and, as a thank-you to Hitori for buying her food, sets up an impromptu live show on the street with her to help her sell the remaining tickets. With Kikuri's guidance, Hitori overcomes her fear and completes the street performance. In the end, she is able to sell two tickets, and Kikuri buys the last one.
7	"To Your House"; Transliteration: "Kimi no Uchi Made" (Japanese: 君の家まで)	Keisuke Shinohara	Janchiki Amata	November 20, 2022
Nijika and Kita decide to come to Hitori's house to consider designs for the T-shirts they will wear at the concert. Since this is Hitori's first time inviting someone to her house, she goes overboard with her decorations and confuses her bandmates. Her family quickly warmed up to the two girls and were delighted that Hitori had finally made friends for the first time. In the end, they have spent the whole day without coming up with any designs and decide to use Nijika's initial simple T-shirts design. Unfortunately, a typhoon abruptly changes course, coming near Tokyo on the date of their live performance.
8	"Bocchi the Rock"; Transliteration: "Botchi Za Rokku" (Japanese: ぼっち・ざ・ろっく)	Takeshi Seo	Keiichirō Saitō	November 27, 2022
Despite the typhoon cutting down the expected attendance rate, Kessoku Band moves forward with their concert. Seeing the small crowd and hearing some dejecting comments of the band, the band members, save for Hitori, take a huge hit to their morale and make several mistakes in their opening ("Guitar, Loneliness and Blue Planet") not present during their audition. Unable to accept this, Hitori plays out a spur-of-the-moment guitar solo intro of the second song, "That Band", snapping the girls out of their slump and letting them play out the rest of the concert successfully. During the band's celebration at an izakaya, Nijika tells Hitori that she has deduced her identity as "Guitarhero". Hitori apologizes, stating that she did not want to reveal her identity until she could improve herself so as not to disappoint the others, especially Nijika. Nijika shares about her past and how Starry was made for her by her sister. She states her belief that with Hitori by their side, her dream to make Kessoku Band and Starry famous will come true, as long as she keeps showing her bandmates and audience how "Bocchi the Rock" rocks the stage.
9	"Enoshima Escar"; Transliteration: "Enoshima Esukā" (Japanese: 江ノ島エスカー)	Yoshihiro Hiramine	Yoshihiro Hiramine	December 4, 2022
During summer vacation, Hitori spent every day hoping to go out with her bandmates, but she could never gather the courage to invite them herself. At the end of summer vacation, Hitori becomes utterly depressed. The bandmates realizes that no one spent time with Hitori, so they invite her to the Enoshima coast to make memories. But their excursion leads to several mishaps to Hitori that include being hit on by strangers, losing more money to Ryō, being attacked by black kites, and developing several muscle aches the next day after climbing the long stairs to the Enoshima shrine. Despite this, the group enjoyed the trip together and Hitori feels motivated to start the new semester.
10	"After Dark"; Transliteration: "Afutā Dāku" (Japanese: アフターダーク)	Yūsuke Kawakami	Yūsuke Kawakami	December 11, 2022
Hitori is torn over whether to perform in her school's upcoming cultural festival since she wants to become popular, but Kita submits the application form without telling Hitori, startling her. Kikuri later shows up at Starry and invites Kessoku Band to see her band "Sick Hack" perform live at a Shinjuku live house called "Folt", where they play in a psychedelic rock style. Hitori is highly captivated by the performance but also feels that she was far inferior in comparison. After the show, Kikuri tells Hitori that she was also a reclusive loner throughout school who thought playing rock music would make her popular, and she drank to deal with her nerves before her first live performance. After receiving encouragement from Kikuri, Hitori made up her mind to perform at the cultural festival. After the band finalizes the setlist, Kita apologizes to Hitori for submitting the application form Hitori had thrown away. Hitori thanks her instead and admits that she is already looking forward to the performance, which motivates Kita to train her guitar skill further.
11	"Duodecimal Sunset"; Transliteration: "Jūnishinhō no Yūkei" (Japanese: 十二進法の夕景)	Yūsuke Yamamoto	Yūsuke Yamamoto	December 18, 2022
During the first day of the cultural festival, Hitori hides in a secluded corner of the school after putting on her maid outfit for her class's maid café. She then realizes that she has not updated her "Guitarhero" video account in a while. Hitori's bandmates manage to find her, and the four enjoy touring the school before taking her back to her class, as she was trying to stall to escape her maid café duties. While Hitori struggles to do the bare minimum as a maid, her bandmates find more success when Hitori's classmates dress them up as maids and Ryō as a butler. The next day, the band takes the stage to play an original set.
12	"Morning Light Falls on You"; Transliteration: "Kimi ni Asa ga Furu" (Japanese: 君に朝が降る)	Keiichirō Saitō	Keiichirō Saitō	December 25, 2022
During the concert, the band performs "Never Forget" and "If I Could Be a Constellation". However, Hitori's guitar goes out of tune and one of the strings even snaps before her solo, but she manages to pull through thanks to Kita's improvising plus using one of Kikuri's glass sake containers as a makeshift bottleneck slide. After finishing the song, the audience applauds Hitori's performance, so Kita tries to let Hitori have the spotlight. However, Hitori panics and tries to stage dive into the crowd, falling flat on her face. After recovering from the concert, Hitori's father reveals he secretly monetized Hitori's "Guitarhero" account and gives her the money from the channel's ad revenue, telling her to buy a new guitar with it. Hitori goes shopping with her bandmates, and despite being scared of interacting with the staff inside, finally settles on a new guitar with Kita's help.

== Home video releases ==
=== Japanese-language releases ===
Japanese-language releases
Vol.	Episodes	Cover character(s)	Release date	Ref.
1	1–2	Hitori Gotō	December 28, 2022	
2	3–4	Nijika Ijichi	January 25, 2023	
3	5–6	Ryō Yamada	February 22, 2023	
4	7–8	Ikuyo Kita	March 22, 2023	
5	9–10	Kessoku Band	April 26, 2023	
6	11–12	Kessoku Band	May 24, 2023	

=== English-language releases ===
English-language releases
Region	Distributor	Release date	Ref.
North America	Crunchyroll	January 30, 2024	
Australia	Madman Entertainment	March 6, 2024	
United Kingdom	Crunchyroll	May 12, 2025	
