= List of Kessoku Band live performances =

Kessoku Band live performances
- Logo of the band
- Concert tours: 1
- One-off concerts: 2
- Music festivals: 9
- Television shows and specials: 2
- Other live performances: 6

Kessoku Band, a fictional rock band from the anime television series Bocchi the Rock!, has headlined several concerts and has performed at music festivals, television programs, and other events. The band consists of lead guitarist and lyricist Hitori Gotō (voiced by Yoshino Aoyama), drummer and leader Nijika Ijichi (voiced by Sayumi Suzushiro), bassist and composer Ryō Yamada (voiced by Saku Mizuno), and guitarist and vocalist Ikuyo Kita (voiced by Ikumi Hasegawa). During live performances, the voice cast serves as vocalists and a backing band primarily composed of drummer Osamu Hidai, bassist Yūichi Takama, and guitarists Akkin and Ritsuo Mitsui plays the instruments.

In April 2023, the band held the special event Bocchi the Rock! Desu, which included a live performance segment wherein the cast members sang the theme songs from the anime series. Kessoku Band conducted their first concert, Kessoku Band Live: Kōsei, at Zepp Haneda the following month. In August, they performed as the opening act for the teen-oriented music festival Senko Riot, where Aoyama also served as a guitarist. The band also made their debut television performance in November 2023 as part of the NHK World-Japan Music Festival program. In 2024, they made appearances at Japan Jam and the Rock in Japan Festival.

They undertook a concert tour, Kessoku Band Zepp Tour 2024: We Will, across five cities in Japan from September to December 2024. An additional show, titled Kessoku Band Tour: We Will B, was held at the Musashino Forest Sport Plaza in February 2025, marking their first solo arena concert. During their performance of "Flashbacker" at We Will B, the voice cast played their characters' respective instruments. Kessoku Band also headlined a concert in South Korea in December 2025 and performed at the Megaport Music Festival in Taiwan in March 2026.

== Concert tours ==
Key
†	Denotes upcoming concert tour

List of concert tours, showing dates, cities, and number of shows
Title	Dates	Cities	Shows	Ref.
Kessoku Band Zepp Tour 2024: We Will (Note: The final show in the tour is titled Kessoku Band Tour: We Will B.)	September 8, 2024 – February 15, 2025	Osaka; Sapporo; Tokyo; Nagoya; Fukuoka	6	
Kessoku Band Asia Tour 2027: To Asia †	March 13, 2027 – May 22, 2027	Osaka; Seoul; Hong Kong	4	

== One-off concerts ==
List of one-off concerts, showing dates, event names, and locations
Date	Event	City	Country	Venue	Ref.
May 21, 2023	Kessoku Band Live: Kōsei	Tokyo	Japan	Zepp Haneda	
December 6, 2025	Kessoku Band Live in Korea: From Shimokitazawa	Goyang	South Korea	KINTEX	

== Music festivals ==
List of music festival performances, showing dates, event names, locations, and performed songs
Date	Event	City	Country	Performed song(s)	Ref.
August 7, 2023	Mynavi Senko Riot 2023	Tokyo	Japan	"Rockn' Roll, Morning Light Falls on You"	
May 4, 2024	Japan Jam 2024	Chiba	Japan	"Seishun Complex"; "Guitar, Loneliness and Blue Planet"; "That Band"; "If I Could Be a Constellation"; "Flashbacker"; "The Little Sea"; "Never Forget"; "Into the Light"	
August 4, 2024	Rock in Japan Festival 2024	Chiba	Japan	"Guitar, Loneliness and Blue Planet"; "That Band"; "Karakara"; "Now, I'm Going from Underground"; "What Is Wrong With"; "Rockn' Roll, Morning Light Falls on You"; "Shine as Usual"; "Seishun Complex"	
January 26, 2025	LisAni! Live 2025	Tokyo	Japan	"Seishun Complex"; "Guitar, Loneliness and Blue Planet"; "That Band"; "If I Could Be a Constellation"; "Rockn' Roll, Morning Light Falls on You"	
April 5, 2025	Central Music & Entertainment Festival 2025	Yokohama	Japan	"Never Forget"; "I Can't Sing a Love Song"; "Doppelganger"; "That Band"; "If I Could Be a Constellation"; "Milky Way"; "Bundle Up Your Dreams"; "Rockn' Roll, Morning Light Falls on You"; "Now, I'm Going from Underground"; "Seishun Complex"	
May 4, 2025	Japan Jam 2025	Chiba	Japan	"Seishun Complex"; "Guitar, Loneliness and Blue Planet"; "That Band"; "Blue Spring and Western Sky"; "If I Could Be a Constellation"; "Shine as Usual"; "Never Forget"; "Into the Light"	
September 13, 2025	Rock in Japan Festival 2025	Chiba	Japan	"Re:Re:"; "Unite"; "Karakara"; "Planet"; "Bundle Up Your Dreams"; "What Is Wrong With"; "Now, I'm Going from Underground"; "Seishun Complex"	
March 22, 2026	Megaport Music Festival 2026	Kaohsiung	Taiwan	"That Band"; "Guitar, Loneliness and Blue Planet"; "If I Could Be a Constellation"; "Rockn' Roll, Morning Light Falls on You"; "Re:Re:"; "Shine as Usual"; "Never Forget"; "Seishun Complex"	
April 4, 2026	Central Music & Entertainment Festival 2026	Yokohama	Japan	"That Band"; "Guitar, Loneliness and Blue Planet"; "Doppelganger"; "If I Could Be a Constellation"; "Rockn' Roll, Morning Light Falls on You"; "Re:Re:"; "Shine as Usual"; "Seishun Complex"; "Never Forget"	

== Television shows and specials ==
List of television performances, showing dates, event names, locations, and performed songs
Date	Event	City	Country	Performed song(s)	Ref.
November 26, 2023 (Note: The performance was recorded on October 28, 2023, and was later broadcast on NHK World-Japan on November 26.)	NHK World-Japan Music Festival 2023	Tokyo	Japan	"Seishun Complex"	
June 15, 2024	Venue101	Unknown	Japan	"Shine as Usual"	

== Other live performances ==
Key
†	Denotes upcoming live performance

List of other live performances, showing dates, event names, locations, and performed songs where available
Date	Event	City	Country	Performed song(s)	Ref.
April 23, 2023	Bocchi the Rock! Desu	Tokyo	Japan	"Seishun Complex"; "Distortion!!"; "Karakara"; "What Is Wrong With"; "Rockn' Roll, Morning Light Falls on You"	
January 7, 2024	Aniplex 20th Anniversary Event: Thanx	Tokyo	Japan	"Seishun Complex"; "Rockn' Roll, Morning Light Falls on You"	
June 7, 2024	The First Take	Unknown (Note: Studio in an undisclosed location)	Japan	"Guitar, Loneliness and Blue Planet"	
June 19, 2024	The First Take	Unknown	Japan	"Shine as Usual"	
February 21, 2026	Nissin Yakisoba U.F.O. Presents Gotō Hitori Seitan Kinen Live	Tokyo	Japan	Unknown	
November 1, 2026	Shelter 35th Anniversary Finale: Zepp ga Shelter ni Narimasu	Tokyo	Japan	TBA	
December 13, 2026	Shinjuku Loft 50th Anniversary Dream Match 2026 Premium †	Tokyo	Japan	TBA	
