= Kessoku Band (album) =

Studio album by Kessoku Band
- Released: December 25, 2022
- Studios: Catapult (Tokyo); Victor (Tokyo); Onkio Haus (Tokyo); Sony Music (Tokyo)
- Genres: Rock; J-pop; anime song
- Length: 54:01
- Language: Japanese
- Label: Aniplex
- Producer: Gen Okamura

Kessoku Band chronology
Kessoku Band (2022)	Kessoku Band Concert: Fixed Star at Zepp Haneda (Tokyo) (2024)

Singles from Kessoku Band
- 1. "Seishun Complex" Released: October 9, 2022; 2. "Distortion!!" Released: October 9, 2022; 3. "Karakara" Released: October 30, 2022; 4. "Guitar, Loneliness and Blue Planet" Released: November 6, 2022; 5. "That Band" Released: November 27, 2022; 6. "What Is Wrong With" Released: November 27, 2022; 7. "Never Forget" Released: December 25, 2022; 8. "If I Could Be a Constellation" Released: December 25, 2022; 9. "Rockn' Roll, Morning Light Falls on You" Released: December 25, 2022

Kessoku Band (Japanese: 結束バンド, Hepburn: Kessoku Bando; lit. 'Unity Band' or 'zip tie') is the debut studio album by Kessoku Band, a fictional rock band from the anime television series Bocchi the Rock!. Aniplex released the album digitally on December 25, 2022, and in CD format on December 28. Featuring vocals from voice actresses Yoshino Aoyama, Sayumi Suzushiro, Saku Mizuno, and Ikumi Hasegawa, the album consists of songs featured in the anime series, including a cover version of Asian Kung-Fu Generation's "Rockn' Roll, Morning Light Falls on You", as well as newly recorded material; nine singles preceded the album's physical release.

The album was highly praised by music critics, who complimented its composition, vocal performances, and implementation of elements of Japanese rock music. Commercially, it peaked at number one on the Billboard Japan Hot Albums chart and the Oricon Albums Chart and was certified platinum by the Recording Industry Association of Japan.

== Background and release ==
Kessoku Band is a fictional rock band in the anime television series Bocchi the Rock!, consisting of lead guitarist and lyricist Hitori Gotō (voiced by Yoshino Aoyama), drummer and leader Nijika Ijichi (voiced by Sayumi Suzushiro), bassist and composer Ryō Yamada (voiced by Saku Mizuno), and guitarist and vocalist Ikuyo Kita (voiced by Ikumi Hasegawa). In November 2022, it was announced that the band will release a self-titled album, consisting of 14 tracks including those featured in the anime series. The musicians in charge of Kessoku Band, drummer Osamu Hidai, bassist Yūichi Takama, and guitarists Akkin and Ritsuo Mitsui, were selected by music director Gen Okamura through personal connections, with Hasegawa performing the vocals for most of the songs. Mitsui, who also handled the arrangement of 12 tracks in the album, was approached for the project in early 2020 during the COVID-19 pandemic. The mastering of Kessoku Band was completed a few days before the airing of the anime.

"Secret Base", "I Can't Sing a Love Song", "The Little Sea", and "Flashbacker" are newly recorded songs for the album, while "Rockn' Roll, Morning Light Falls on You" is a cover version of Asian Kung-Fu Generation's song of the same name, and served as the ending theme of the anime's twelfth and final episode. Several Japanese musicians have contributed to the album's songs, such as Ai Higuchi, Otoha, Ikkyū Nakajima of Tricot and Genie High, Maguro Taniguchi of Kana-Boon, Yūho Kitazawa of the Peggies, Kayoko Kusano, and Zaq.

Nine singles debuted prior to the album's physical release: "Seishun Complex" and "Distortion!!" on October 9, 2022; "Karakara" on October 30; "Guitar, Loneliness and Blue Planet" on November 6; "That Band" and "What Is Wrong With" on November 27; and "Never Forget", "If I Could Be a Constellation", and "Rockn' Roll, Morning Light Falls on You" on December 25. Kessoku Band was distributed in advance on digital music and streaming platforms on December 25, 2022, before releasing in CD format on December 28. A limited edition of the CD included a Blu-ray containing the opening and ending sequences of the anime series. Kessoku Band performed the album's songs at their Fixed Star concert, held at Zepp Haneda in Tokyo on May 21, 2023. The album was released as a two-disc vinyl LP on December 27, 2023, featuring a new cover art by the anime's character designer Kerorira. In the United States, Milan Records also released the album as a cassette tape on August 16, 2024.

== Critical reception ==
Kessoku Band was highly praised by music critics. Tomomi Yonemura of Kai-You noted that the album incorporating elements of Japanese rock music and the lyrics being faithful to the characters' setting received favorable reception. In a review for Mikiki, Shinichirō Wada called the album "a truly exceptional piece of music that does not get stuck in the usual 'anime song style'", adding that the "metal-like" lead guitar creates a unique structure that "did not seem to exist at the time of the 2000s and 2010s". Wada also praised the vocals, particularly of Hasegawa and Aoyama, and the album's cohesiveness, but described the transition from the beginning to middle as "rough". Tomonori Shiba, writing for Nikkei Marketing Journal, described the music as high-quality and "filled with the essence of Japanese guitar rock from the 2000s onward", which originated in Shimokitazawa, the primary setting of Bocchi the Rock! Z11 of Real Sound opined that the album's sound corresponds to the theme of the series; the vocals "give a sense of a world connected to the story" and the texture of the songs evokes the presence of the main characters. At the 2024 CD Shop Awards, the album was a finalist for the Grand Prix award in the Blue category.

== Commercial performance ==
Kessoku Band debuted at number one on Billboard Japan's Download Albums chart dated December 28, 2022, with 5,877 recorded downloads from December 19–25, and has remained at the top for seven non-consecutive weeks. It also entered atop the Top Albums Sales chart dated January 4, 2023, with 73,244 sales recorded from December 26, 2022, to January 1, 2023. The album opened at number six on the Hot Albums chart dated December 28, 2022, but rose to number one the following week. The album debuted atop the Oricon Albums Chart dated January 9, 2023, recording 72,553 sales in its first week. It also topped the Digital Albums Chart (17,756 downloads) and the Combined Albums Chart on the same issue date. Kessoku Band remained at number one in the Digital Albums Chart for four consecutive weeks, marking the first time a female group achieved that record. It ranked in the top 10 of the chart for 25 non-consecutive weeks. In February 2023, the album was certified gold by the Recording Industry Association of Japan for reaching 100,000 shipments. In June 2024, it was certified platinum for reaching 250,000 shipments.

The album topped Billboard Japan's 2023 year-end Download Albums chart and ranked 11th in the year-end Hot Albums chart. It also topped Oricon's year-end Digital Albums Chart with 70,132 downloads, which is the first time a female group took first place in the ranking.

== Track listing ==
Credits adapted from the album's liner notes.

Kessoku Band track listing
No.	Title	Lyrics	Music	Vocals	Length
1.	"Seishun Complex" (青春コンプレックス, Seishun Konpurekkusu)	Ai Higuchi	Otoha	Ikumi Hasegawa	3:23
2.	"Hitoribocchi Tokyo" (ひとりぼっち東京)	Higuchi	Masamichi Nagai	Hasegawa	3:52
3.	"Distortion!!"	Maguro Taniguchi	Taniguchi	Hasegawa	3:23
4.	"Secret Base" (ひみつ基地, Himitsu Kichi)	Zaq	Daichi Yoshioka	Hasegawa	3:52
5.	"Guitar, Loneliness and Blue Planet" (ギターと孤独と蒼い惑星, Gitā to Kodoku to Aoi Hoshi)	Zaq	Otoha	Hasegawa	3:48
6.	"I Can't Sing a Love Song" (ラブソングが歌えない, Rabu Songu ga Utaenai)	Zaq	Kōhei Tsukada	Hasegawa	3:08
7.	"That Band" (あのバンド, Ano Bando)	Higuchi	Kayoko Kusano	Hasegawa	3:33
8.	"Karakara" (カラカラ)	Ikkyū Nakajima	Nakajima	Saku Mizuno	4:25
9.	"The Little Sea" (小さな海, Chiisana Umi)	Otoha	Otoha	Hasegawa	3:43
10.	"What Is Wrong With" (なにが悪い, Nani ga Warui)	Yūho Kitazawa	Kitazawa	Sayumi Suzushiro	3:47
11.	"Never Forget" (忘れてやらない, Wasurete Yaranai)	Zaq	Yoshioka	Hasegawa	3:43
12.	"If I Could Be a Constellation" (星座になれたら, Seiza ni Naretara)	Higuchi	Hidemasa Naito	Hasegawa	4:18
13.	"Flashbacker" (フラッシュバッカー, Furasshubakkā)	Otoha	Otoha	Hasegawa	4:35
14.	"Rockn' Roll, Morning Light Falls on You" (転がる岩、君に朝が降る, Korogaru Iwa, Kimi ni Asa ga Furu)	Masafumi Gotoh	Gotoh	Yoshino Aoyama	4:31
Total length:					54:01

Kessoku Band – limited edition Blu-ray bonus
No.	Title	Length
1.	"Seishun Complex" (non-credit opening video)	1:32
2.	"Distortion!!" (non-credit ending video)	1:32
3.	"Karakara" (non-credit ending video)	1:32
4.	"What Is Wrong With" (non-credit ending video)	1:32
Total length:		6:08

== Personnel ==
Credits adapted from The First Times and the album's liner notes.

=== Fictional line-up ===
- Ikuyo Kita – vocals, guitar
- Hitori Gotō – lead guitar, lyrics
- Ryō Yamada – bass, backing vocals, composition
- Nijika Ijichi – drums

=== Musicians ===
- Osamu Hidai – drums (all tracks)
- Yūichi Takama – bass (all tracks)
- Akkin – guitar (all tracks), arrangement (5–6)
- Ritsuo Mitsui – guitar (all tracks), arrangement (1–4, 7–14)
- Ikumi Hasegawa (as Ikuyo Kita) – vocals (tracks 1–7, 9, 11–13), backing vocals
- Yoshino Aoyama (as Hitori Gotō) – vocals (track 14), backing vocals
- Saku Mizuno (as Ryō Yamada) – vocals (track 8), backing vocals
- Sayumi Suzushiro (as Nijika Ijichi) – vocals (track 10), backing vocals

=== Technical ===
- Gen Okamura – director
- Gendam – recording, mixing
- Yūji Kamijō – recording
- Mitsuyasu Abe – mastering
- Masaharu Yamanouchi – production
- Ken Kobayashi – production cooperation
- Shunsuke Arai – production cooperation
- Naomi Kobayashi – production cooperation
- Yūji Kimura – production cooperation
- Keigo Mikami – production cooperation
- Yōko Shimane – production cooperation
- Kōhei Yamada – production cooperation

=== Design ===
- Kerorira – key frame
- Asuka Yokota – coloring
- Tsubasa Kanamori – photography
- Yasunao Moriyasu – background
- Tomoyuki Uchikoga – product design

== Charts ==
=== Weekly charts ===
Weekly chart performance for Kessoku Band
Chart (2023)	Peak position
Japanese Albums (Oricon)	1
Japanese Combined Albums (Oricon)	1
Japanese Hot Albums (Billboard Japan)	1

=== Monthly charts ===
Monthly chart performance for Kessoku Band
Chart (2023)	Position
Japanese Albums (Oricon)	4

=== Year-end charts ===
2023 year-end chart performance for Kessoku Band
Chart (2023)	Position
Japanese Albums (Oricon)	34
Japanese Digital Albums (Oricon)	1
Japanese Hot Albums (Billboard Japan)	11

2024 year-end chart performance for Kessoku Band
Chart (2024)	Position
Japanese Hot Albums (Billboard Japan)	93

== Certifications and sales ==
Certifications and sales for Kessoku Band
Region	Certification	Certified units/sales
Japan (RIAJ)	Platinum	250,000^{^}
Japan Digital	—	76,336
^{^} Shipments figures based on certification alone.

== Release history ==
Release dates and formats for Kessoku Band
Region	Date	Format(s)	Edition(s)	Label	Ref.
Various	December 25, 2022	Digital download; streaming	—N/a	Aniplex	
Japan	December 28, 2022	CD	Limited	Aniplex	
Japan	December 27, 2023	CD	Standard	Aniplex	
Japan	December 27, 2023	Vinyl LP	Limited	Aniplex	
United States	August 16, 2024	Cassette	Limited	Milan	

== See also ==
- List of Oricon number-one albums of 2023
- List of Billboard Japan Hot Albums number ones of 2023
