= Bocchi the Rock! (TV series) =

Japanese anime television series

- ぼっち・ざ・ろっく！ Botchi Za Rokku!
- Type: Television series
- Genre: Comedy; Music; Slice of life
- Based on: Bocchi the Rock!
- Created by: Aki Hamazi
- Directed by: Keiichirō Saitō (S1); Yūsuke Yamamoto (S2)
- Series composition: Erika Yoshida
- Screenplay by: Erika Yoshida
- Character designers: Kerorira; Keito Oda (S2)
- Music by: Tomoki Kikuya; Gen Okamura (director)
- Voices of: Yoshino Aoyama; Sayumi Suzushiro; Saku Mizuno; Ikumi Hasegawa; Maaya Uchida; Sayaka Senbongi
- Opening theme: "Seishun Complex" by Kessoku Band
- Ending themes: "Distortion!!"; "Karakara"; "What Is Wrong With"; by Kessoku Band
- Country of origin: Japan
- Original language: Japanese
- No. of seasons: 1
- No. of episodes: 12 (list of episodes)

Production
- Art director: Yasunao Moriyasu
- Sound director: Akiko Fujita
- Cinematographer: Tsubasa Kanamori
- Color designer: Asuka Yokota
- CG director: Katsuaki Miyaji
- Editor: Daisuke Hiraki
- Animation producer: Shōta Umehara
- Studio: CloverWorks
- Producer: Tatsuya Ishikawa; Hiroyuki Kobayashi
- Production company: Aniplex; Houbunsha
- Runtime: 24 minutes

Original release
- Networks: Tokyo MX, BS11, GTV, GYT, MRT, MBS, AT-X, RKB
- Release: Season 1: October 9 - December 25, 2022

Related
- Anime film

Eiga Bocchi the Rock! Hoshi no Ashiato
- Directed by: Shin Wakabayashi
- Written by: Erika Yoshida
- Studio: CloverWorks
- Released: 2027

Bocchi the Rock! (Japanese: ぼっち・ざ・ろっく！, Hepburn: Botchi Za Rokku!) is a Japanese anime television series produced by CloverWorks, based on the four-panel manga series Bocchi the Rock! by Aki Hamazi. The series follows the socially anxious Hitori Gotō as she joins Kessoku Band and fulfills her dream of performing live.

The first season consists of 12 episodes and aired from October to December 2022. On June 7, 2024, the first part of the series' compilation film was released in Japan, with the second part released on August 9 of the same year. In February 2025, production of the second season was announced. A prequel film, Eiga Bocchi the Rock! Hoshi no Ashiato, is set to be released in 2027.

The series received widespread critical acclaim for its animation, writing, music, and exploration of social anxiety, as well as numerous awards.

== Characters ==
- Yoshino Aoyama as Hitori Gotō
- Sayumi Suzushiro as Nijika Ijichi
- Saku Mizuno as Ryō Yamada
- Ikumi Hasegawa as Ikuyo Kita
- Maaya Uchida as Seika Ijichi
- Kotori Koiwai as PA-san
- Sayaka Senbongi as Kikuri Hiroi
- Misaki Watada as Futari Gotō

== Production ==
=== Development ===
Prior to the greenlighting of Bocchi the Rock!'s anime adaptation, character designer and chief animation director Kerorira was a fan of the manga for its comedy, art style, and characters, and in particular Hitori's unhinged nature. While meeting with animation producer Shouta Umehara at an illustrator exhibition, Kerorira brought up the series and expressed a desire to work on an anime adaptation of the series. As it so happened, Aniplex had just recently proposed such a project to CloverWorks. Kerorira joined the project as its character designer after expressing his enthusiasm for the series and presenting his drawings of the characters. In addition to the character designs and animation supervision, Kerorira also contributed a significant amount of key animation to the project, which he stated was done to provide the other animators with an understanding of the "platonic ideal" of the anime's production value. Kerorira felt that providing such a baseline as the chief animation director would allow for smoother collaboration, as it would lead to a creatively unified end product while allowing the animation staff to incorporate their own individual expression and limit the number of corrections that would need to be made after the fact.

Series director Keiichirō Saitō, who previously served as episode director on The Idolmaster SideM and Sonny Boy, came to work on the anime adaptation of Bocchi the Rock! after Kerorira recommended him to animation producer Shouta Umehara. As Umehara was familiar with Saitō's work, he considered Saitō to be an ideal choice, and Saitō joined the project as director a few days later after discussions with Umehara and Kerorira. Erika Yoshida, the screenwriter in charge of series composition, was recommended on referral from a colleague of Umehara's at Aniplex, who had previously collaborated with Yoshida on Love Me, Love Me Not. As he was aware of Bocchi's similarity in premise and genre to K-On!, Umehara spoke to Kerorira, asking him what unique qualities the series had that would distinguish it from K-On!, and worked to help ensure that capturing those aspects of the series was a priority of the production.

=== Writing ===
When reading the manga prior to production, Saitō was attracted to the relationships between the protagonist, Hitori, and the supporting cast. Unlike the closer relationships typical of other Manga Time Kirara titles, their dynamic gave Saitō the impression that "they respect each other's individuality and personal space." He found this quality both distinctive and personally relatable. Saitō also liked the ways in which Hitori's expressions were often exaggerated to perceptibly disturbing extents, in contravention of moe conventions. This aspect of Hitori's characterization was expanded upon in the anime, as Saitō believed that "girls who are flawlessly beautiful aren't as cute as girls who are a little mysterious or sometimes make weird faces."

In adapting Bocchi the Rock! from its original 4-koma format, Saitō and Yoshida introduced numerous substantial differences from the source material, such as rearranging events and altering some jokes to aid the anime version's pacing and surreal presentation. Saitō and Yoshida gave the anime a surrealist edge to prioritize comedy and emotion over strict realism, finding that cutaway gags helped sharpen each episode's narrative focus. To integrate these sequences, Saitō contrasted protagonist Hitori's introspective thoughts and eccentric behavior with the supporting cast's external reactions. This approach served narrative pacing and direction while framing Hitori more empathetically, demonstrating that her peers viewed her far less pathetically than she imagined. Saitō noted that deciding how much detail to give these surrounding background conversations proved to be one of the production's greatest challenges.

In terms of character portrayal, Saitō emphasized that Hitori's eccentric traits should not be depicted too strongly, as this could make viewers uncomfortable. Instead, both her positive and negative traits should be presented in memorable way. Saitō stated that: "We strived to make you laugh when she does something weird, but also make her especially captivating when she shows off her cool side from time to time." Original creator Aki Hamazi also stated that she did not want either "introvert" or "extrovert" characters to be "portrayed as if they were bad people", noting that although Hitori is isolated, she is not bullied because of it.

=== Animation ===
A scene from episode 4 showing Hitori Gotō's exaggerated facial deformation and the reactions of the other three members of Kessoku Band, showcasing the series' exaggerated animation style

Character designer and chief animation director Kerorira drew somewhere between 500 to 600 key animation frames in total, while director Keiichirō Saito was responsible for the opening animation, storyboards for four episodes, and the direction of two episodes. Kerorira originally considered an animation style with more lines and richer details, but ultimately adopted the simpler style requested by Saito in order to facilitate the production of scenes with extensive movement. Kerorira also gave each key animator a high degree of creative freedom to enrich the expressiveness of the animation. The anime also frequently incorporates live-action footage; screenwriter Erika Yoshida stated that this was not done to reduce workload, but rather to add entertainment value.

Kerorira additionally said that Hitori's withdrawn nature made it more difficult to depict her emotions visually compared to those of the other characters. As such, her basic facial expressions were limited, while the animation relied on the more "slapstick" scenes of exaggeration to depict her emotions. Although the team paid close attention to maintaining Hitori's cute image, scenes where her expressions become heavily distorted prioritized comedic effect over cuteness. Kerorira stated that Nijika Ijichi and Ikuyo Kita have similar personalities and visual characteristics. To better distinguish them, Nijika was designed with a slightly more mature feeling, while Kita has a greater emphasis on her cheerfulness and childlike qualities, with a more youthful smile than Nijika's. For Ryō Yamada, who does not display obvious emotions, Kerorira adjusted the way her eyes were drawn when joking in order to show subtle changes in expression and her mischievous personality without disrupting her overall image.

To create the live concert scenes of the anime, the production team recorded physical actors playing the concerts. The recording was then adapted into a computer-generated previsualization so that the animators could establish their preferred shot direction for the scenes using a virtual camera system. The previsualization was then used as the basis for the final animation. To ensure that the characters were portrayed accurately in these scenes, the actors were given information about the characters and advised on how to convincingly physically act as them. This process was handled by concert director Yusuke Kawakami. Afterwards, concert animator Yuki Ito's team drew the key animation based on the completed 3D computer graphics footage.

=== Casting ===
Yoshino Aoyama, Sayumi Suzushiro, Saku Mizuno, and Ikumi Hasegawa respectively voice Hitori Gotō, Nijika Ijichi, Ryō Yamada, and Ikuyo Kita. Animation producer Umehara noted that whenever the production team had differing opinions regarding voice actor selection, the input of the original work's creator Aki Hamazi played a decisive role. In particular, the voice actors for Hitori Gotō and Ryō Yamada were not finalized for a long time, and were ultimately chosen by Hamazi herself. Hamazi stated that Aoyama's performance made her burst into laughter on the spot, saying that Aoyama portrayed the character like a "strange otaku". Umehara felt that the four cast members fits perfectly with their characters, especially Hitori and Nijika, with Suzushiro most closely resembled the character herself.

Aoyama said that during her school years she was a relatively cheerful otaku, but was fundamentally still an "introvert", allowing her to strongly relate to Hitori Gotō. During the recording sessions, sound effects director Akiko Fujita also provided Aoyama with detailed guidance, such as speaking "as if she were looking at the floor" and making her voice "a little more ordinary". Suzushiro stated that Nijika Ijichi possesses traits of both an introvert and an extrovert, and often says things while pretending to be carefree. Mizuno described Ryō Yamada as a calm "odd person", and was instructed during recording to speak "in a way without emotional fluctuations". Hasegawa considered Ikuyo Kita to be a complete extrovert; when voicing serious conversations between Kita and Hitori, she was often reminded to "be more cheerful and not worry about anything".

=== Music ===
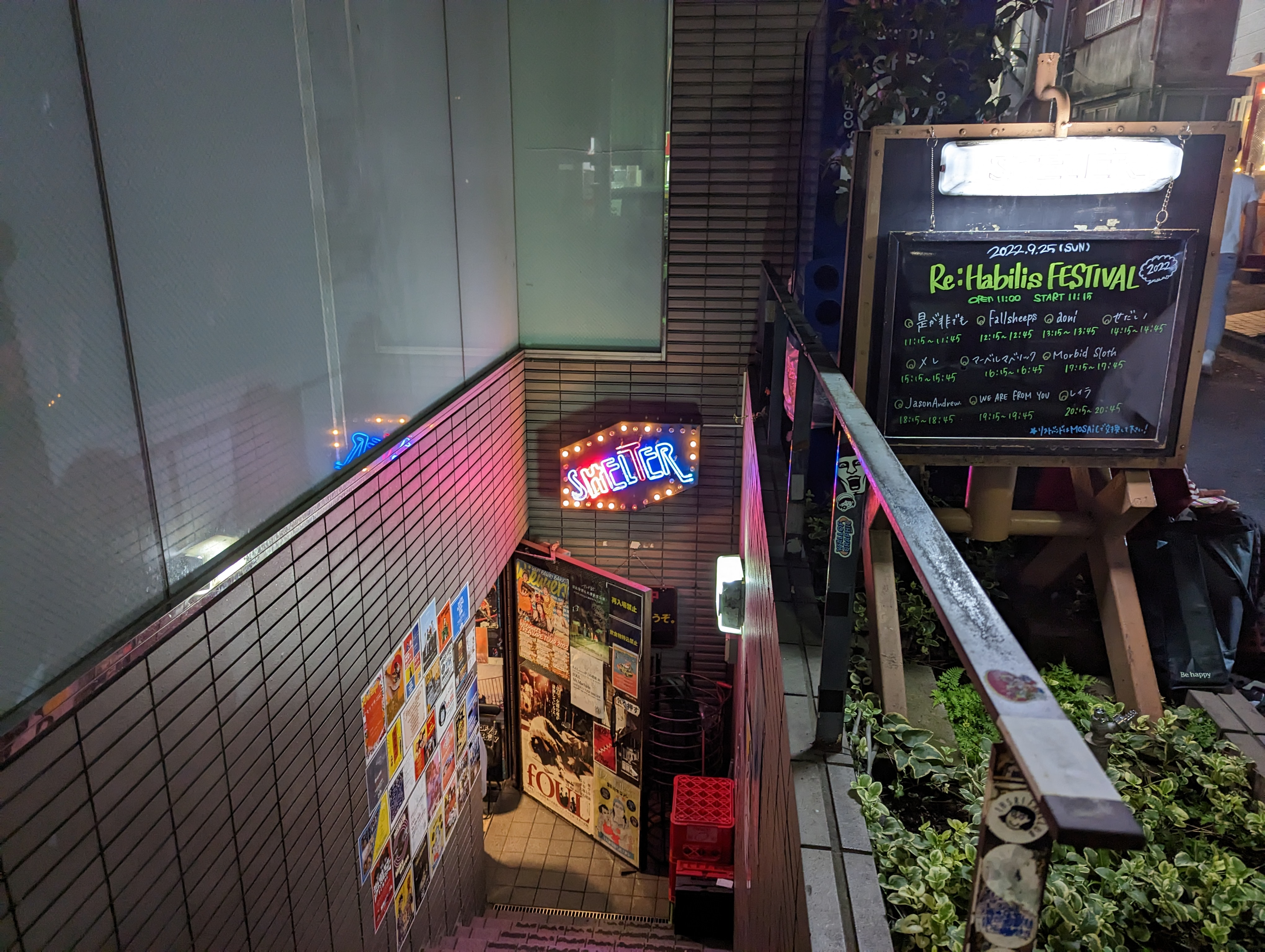
Shelter, the live house located in Shimokitazawa upon which the fictional Starry, a primary setting of the series, is based

The series' music was overseen by Gen Okamura from Aniplex's music department, who served as music director; while Tomoki Kikuya composed the background music. The lyrics for the theme songs and insert songs were mainly written by Ai Higuchi, Otoha, and Zaq, while artists such as Maguro Taniguchi of Kana-Boon, Yuho Kitazawa of The Peggies, and Ikkyū Nakajima of Tricot also participated in songwriting. The performers for Kessoku Band were assembled by Okamura: drummer Osamu Hidai, bassist Yūichi Takama, and guitarists Akkin and Ritsuo Mitsui. Mitsui also handled the arrangement of most songs in the anime, marking his first involvement in anime music production. Regarding the direction of the songs, original creator Aki Hamazi and assistant producer Mikihiro Takayama stated that they wanted them to directly capture a "Shimokitazawa band style" rather than becoming fashionable or cute pop songs. As a result, many of the musicians involved in songwriting came from the Shimokitazawa music scene. Okamura also mentioned that he frequently visited Shelter, the real-life inspiration for the live house "Starry" appearing in the anime, when he was younger.

During arrangement, Mitsui and Okamura decided not to use instruments outside of those played by Kessoku Band, constructing the songs primarily with bass, drums, and two guitars while considering the personalities and playing abilities of the four characters. The opening theme "Seishun Complex" was written by Ai Higuchi and composed by Otoha, and was selected through an internal song submission process. Takayama described the song as having a strong "band feeling"; Otoha stated that while writing it, "bitter memories of my school days came flooding back", resulting in a relatively "dark" melody. During arrangement, Okamura suggested emphasizing Hitori's playing, whereas the team had previously focused more on balancing lead guitar and rhythm guitar. The characteristic that Kessoku Band's songs are extremely difficult for bass and guitar players was also established through this song.

== Release ==
=== Main series ===
An anime television series adaptation was announced on February 18, 2021. The series aired from October 9 to December 25, 2022, on Tokyo MX and other networks. (Note: Tokyo MX listed the series premiere at 24:00 JST on October 8, 2022, which is effectively October 9 at midnight.) Crunchyroll streamed the series outside of Asia. Plus Media Networks Asia licensed the series in Southeast Asia and released it on Aniplus Asia and Bilibili. Several web series featuring the voice cast were also produced alongside the anime as cross-promotion.

Many of the anime's episode titles come from songs by rock band Asian Kung-Fu Generation, such as "After Dark" and "Korogaru Iwa, Kimi ni Asa ga Furu," with the final episode ending with a Kessoku Band cover of the latter.

A compilation film of the series was announced on May 21, 2023. It was split into two parts, which are titled "Re:" and "Re:Re:", and opened on June 7 and August 9, respectively. Kessoku Band performed the song "Tsukinami ni Kagayake" (月並みに輝け; Shine as Usual) as part of the first film's opening sequence. The films have been screened overseas in North America (United States, Canada and Mexico), Europe (France, Italy, Germany and the UK), and Oceania (Australia and New Zealand) by Crunchyroll, South Korea by Daewon Media, Taiwan, Hong Kong, and Macau by Mighty Media and the Southeast Asia (the Philippines, Cambodia, Laos, Malaysia, Singapore, Indonesia, Vietnam and Thailand) by Odex. On November 3, 2024, during the Kessoku Band concert at Zepp Haneda, it was announced that the film would be released on physical media on February 12, 2025. The two parts were released on Crunchyroll on February 13, 2025, as "Bocchi The Rock! Recap Part 1" and "Bocchi The Rock! Recap Part 2".

A second season was announced at Kessoku Band's "We Will B" live event on February 15, 2025. Yūsuke Yamamoto will direct the season, while Keito Oda will serve as character designer with Kerorira.

=== Prequel film ===
A new film, titled Eiga Bocchi the Rock! Hoshi no Ashiato (映画ぼっち・ざ・ろっく！ 星のあしあと; Bocchi the Rock! The Movie: Starry Footprints), was announced on November 1, 2026. It adapts a prequel story from the manga's fifth volume and focuses on the Ijichi sisters. The film is directed by Shin Wakabayashi based on a screenplay by Erika Yoshida, with character designs by Yukiko Horiguchi. It is scheduled to be released in Japan by Animec in 2027.

== Music ==
External videos
- "Seishun Complex" by Kessoku Band, opening animation in season 1
- "That Band" by Kessoku Band, live concert performance in season 1 episode 8

The opening theme of the anime series is "Seishun Complex" sung by Ikuyo Kita (Ikumi Hasegawa), and the anime has four ending themes: "Distortion!!" also sung by Ikumi Hasegawa from episodes 1–3, "Karakara" sung by Ryō Yamada (Saku Mizuno) from episodes 4–7, "What Is Wrong With" sung by Nijika Ijichi (Sayumi Suzushiro) from episodes 8–11, and "Rockn' Roll, Morning Light Falls on You", a cover of the Asian Kung-Fu Generation song of the same name, sung by Hitori Gotō (Yoshino Aoyama) in episode 12. The series also had a number of insert songs, including "Guitar, Loneliness and Blue Planet" in episode 5, "That Band" in episode 8, "I'm the Only Ghost" in episode 10, and "Never Forget" and "If I Could Be a Constellation" in episode 12. Each of these insert songs were also sung by Ikumi Hasegawa, except "I'm the Only Ghost", which was sung by Kikuri Hiroi (Sayaka Senbongi).

Most of these songs had a digital single released individually on various streaming platforms on the same day as their anime debuts: "Seishun Complex" and "Distortion!!" on October 9, "Karakara" on October 30, "Guitar, Loneliness and Blue Planet" on November 6, "That Band" and "What Is Wrong With" on November 27, and "Never Forget", "If I Could Be a Constellation" and "Rock'n Roll, Morning Light Falls on You" on December 25, 2022. A full single of Seishun Complex, including the B side track "Hitoribocchi Tokyo" (played in the teaser video of the series) and instrumental versions of both songs released on October 12, 2022, on digital platforms and in physical stores. However, the song "I'm the Only Ghost" was only released alongside the fifth volume of the anime in Blu-ray on April 26, 2023.

A full album of songs by Kessoku Band, named Kessoku Band, was also released digitally on December 25 and later physically on December 28, 2022. It contained 14 songs, nine of them originally featured in the anime as opening, ending, and insert songs, while the rest were original songs exclusive to the album or not featured in the main series, like "Hitoribocchi Tokyo" and "Flashbacker" (the former was used in the teaser video and the latter was used in a post-premiere PV). The original soundtracks of the anime were released as two volumes, each included in the first two Blu-ray releases of the anime on December 28, 2022, and January 25, 2023, respectively. The album reached number one on the Billboard Japan Hot Albums chart and the Oricon Albums Chart.

=== Additional albums ===
On May 22, 2023, Kessoku Band released a single titled "Into the Light" featuring two new songs, "Into the Light" and "Blue Spring and Western Sky". The first song is written and composed by Genki Fujimori, the vocalist and guitarist of Sakanamon. On June 9, 2024, Kessoku Band released the single titled "Shine as Usual / Now, I'm Going from Underground" featuring the opening and ending theme for the first half of the compilation film for the anime. The ending theme is written and composed by Yuuho Kitazawa, the vocalist and guitarist of The Peggies. On August 11, 2024, the opening ("Doppelganger") and ending ("Re:Re:") to the second part of the film was released as a digital single along with Sick Hack's "I'm the Only Ghost". On August 14, 2024, a mini-album titled Re:Kessoku Band was released containing songs used for the theatrical compilation films, including new song "Me and the Three Primary Colors" which is a tie-in collaboration with the I-Lohas beverage promotional campaign. On November 6, 2024, the EP "We will" is released in anticipation of the live tour We will at Zepp's. It contains four songs featuring the theme and vocals of each member of the Kessoku Band, with each song written and composed by a different artist: Shinya Ishihara of Saucy Dog, Ohki Nobuo of Acidman, Gen of 04 Limited Sazabys and Chiaki Satō.

=== Live performances ===
A live concert titled Kessoku Band Live: Kōsei featuring the main voice cast was held at Zepp Haneda on May 21, 2023. In 2024, a concert tour titled Kessoku Band Zepp Tour 2024: We Will was held at Zepp Osaka Bayside, Zepp Sapporo, Zepp Haneda, Zepp Nagoya, and Zepp Fukuoka on September 8, October 19, November 3, November 24, and December 22, respectively. An additional venue and date was announced later to be held on February 15, 2025, at Main Arena, Musashino Forest Sport Plaza Tokyo under the name We Will B. At We Will B, the four voice actresses from Kessoku Band made a surprise appearance and performed "Flashbacker" live playing their character's respective instruments.

== Reception ==
=== Popularity ===
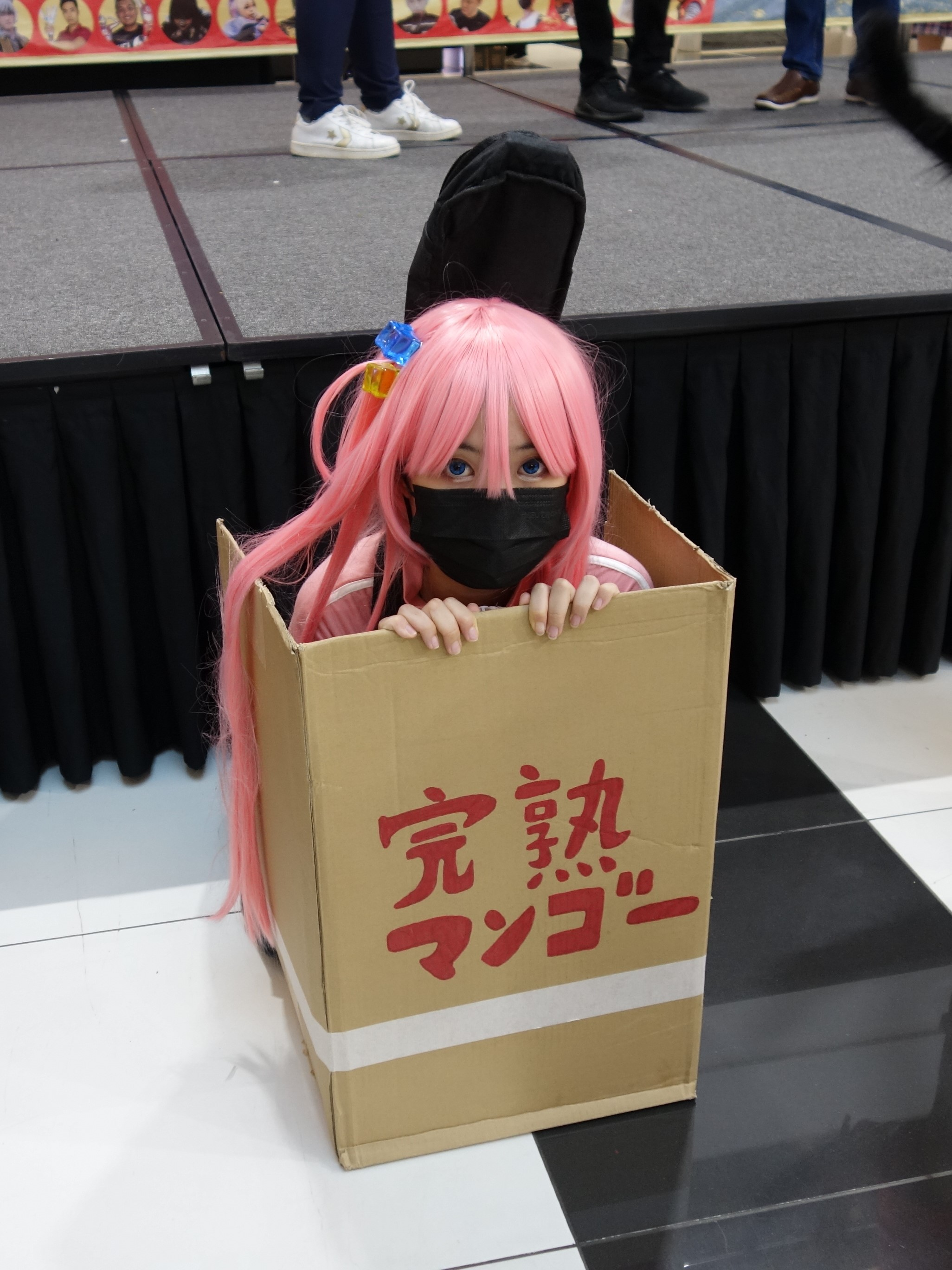
Cosplay of series protagonist Hitori Gotō

The anime was not as highly anticipated by audiences as many more previously established series airing at the same time, such as Chainsaw Man and Mobile Suit Gundam: The Witch from Mercury. However, as the anime progressed, it gained a larger audience due to clips from the anime going viral online.

The series' sudden growth in popularity following the airing of the anime prompted an unexpected influx of fans who formed an excessive line at mangaka Aki Hamazi's booth at Comiket 101 on December 30, 2022, prompting event organizers to direct Hamazi to a different location. Consequently, Hamazi moved her booth outside of the event hall and published a map directing fans to its new location. Wares at Hamazi's booth were exhausted by 12:51 pm that day.

The sales of manga's volumes began to surge around the broadcast of the anime's third episode, which the publisher Houbunsha described as one of the highest growth compared to other anime adaptations. This had caused the volumes to be sold out in various bookstores.

The popularity of the anime also led to skyrocketing demand for musical instruments, especially guitars, where instrument shops recorded a spike of instruments being sold right after the anime ended. Models used specifically by the characters (such as the Gibson Les Paul and Yamaha Pacifica guitars used by Hitori) went out of stock, with no definite restock date. Sales of instruments to beginners also increased (with stocks being depleted in some cases), as many people started to pick up instruments to play due to the series.

Shimokitazawa, particularly the Shelter live house that Starry is based on, also recorded an increase in visitors making otaku pilgrimages to places appearing in the series. The official website of the series subsequently issued a reminder to fans to behave properly when visiting such places and to support paid performances.

Kessoku Band were appointed as Shimokitazawa official ambassadors as part of the town promotion of Shimokitazawa Curry Fest 2023, where food premises around Shimokitazawa offer various curry menus. A stamp rally was held where visitors could redeem merchandise by collecting stamps from purchases.

=== Sales ===
Blu-ray and DVD sales reached 14,821 and 1,972 copies, respectively, in the first week of the release of the first volume and placed second for the most Blu-ray sales that week. The second volume records 16,205 and 588 copies sold, respectively, for Blu-ray and DVD in the first release week. The third volume records 17,856 Blu-ray and 1,535 DVDs, and the fourth records 17,196 Blu-ray and 1,451 DVDs on their first week of sales.

The album Kessoku Band sold 36,530 copies on release day and subsequently 72,533 copies in the first week, charting first place in Oricon and Billboard Japan for the top album that week and continuing to maintain its performance in the weekly top 10 album sales. It was certified gold in January 2023 and later platinum in May 2024 by the Recording Industry Association of Japan (RIAJ) after it reached more than 100,000 and 250,000 physical sales, respectively. The opening theme, Seishun Complex, was also certified gold in streaming when it reached 50 million listenings on streaming platforms in November 2023, and two of its insert songs, Guitar, Loneliness and Blue Planet and If I Could Be a Constellation follows in March and May 2024 respectively.

The first part of its compilation film, Bocchi the Rock! Re: saw the film topping the weekend chart of Japan's box office on its opening weekend, with earnings going up to 218 million yen (approximately 1.39 million US dollars) and 140,000 attendees recorded. This was the first time an anime compilation film (with the contents being only a recap of its original series) managed to top the chart. The first and second part of the compilation film has surpassed 640 million yen and 500 million yen in box office sales respectively.

=== Critical reception ===
In Anime News Network's Fall 2022 Preview Guide, the series received positive responses upon its debut. Caitlin Moore praised the realistic depiction of Hitori's guitar playing as well as the "slightly acerbic" comedy which helped avoid the show becoming "too gentle" and contributed to Hitori's relatability. James Beckett similarly complimented the anime's attention to detail regarding the musical activity, in contrast to other similar anime, which he felt were generally not attentive to such logistical elements. Rebecca Silverman's agreed that Hitori was relatable and found the first episode engaging, but she believed that the anime "seems to conflate introversion and social anxiety" and did not like the visuals. Richard Eisenbeis stated that the show's cringe comedy was not to his personal taste, though he acknowledged its solid underlying lessons. Nicholas Dupree opined that Hitori's character felt "authentic" to "the kind of introverted kid who would wear band merch and carry their guitar to school in a bid to seem interesting." Following the season conclusion, Dupree called the series a funny, creative, and heartwarming comedy, particularly highlighting the concert sequence and the heart-to-heart conversation between Hitori and Nijika Ijichi in Episode 8. Dupree also selected Kikuri Hiroi as his character of the year, describing her wild personality alongside her "surprising insight and empathy" as the "platonic ideal of a rock star."

Several critics compared the anime with K-On!, another work serialized in Manga Time Kirara, describing it as the "Reiwa-era version of K-On! ". Liang You of The News Lens noted that K-On! focuses primarily on everyday life, whereas Bocchi the Rock! focuses primarily on the band elements. Rafael Motamayor of IGN strongly praised the anime for its story, themes, and visual creativity, comparing it favorably to K-On! and Keep Your Hands Off Eizouken!. He described the show as a spiritual successor to K-On!, though noting that the latter focused more on how a group of girls become friends.

The portrayal of social anxiety also resonated strongly with general viewers. An editor for Eslite Bookstore noted that behind its high school music setting, the series exposes the widespread psychological state of modern people feeling lonely even in a crowd. Vista Weekly similarly noted that the series touched upon the real pain points of contemporary youth, calling it a work that captures modern societal anxieties and has the potential to become a classic for a generation. Critics also evaluated the show's depiction of social anxiety against other anime addressing similar themes such as Komi Can't Communicate, which some felt relied on anxiety purely as a comedic device or a romanticized trope. Motamayor noted that Bocchi the Rock! did not make light of the protagonist's struggles for comedy. Moore shared a similar view, though she felt that the portrayal of Hitori's anxiety occasionally went too far, leaving viewers who related to her feeling mocked. Adam Wescott of Crunchyroll News favorably compared the series to Watamote for its exploration of anxiety and artistic self-expression, and praised the visual inventiveness of the "anxiety attack" sequences, including the integration of CGI and stop motion animation.

The realistic depiction of band culture resonated with musicians and industry figures. Writing for Real Sound, Yoruno stated that the anime captured emotional moments that only actual band members could fully appreciate. Motamayor highlighted how the series addressed realistic struggles such as creative writer's block, financial strain, and live performance mistakes, demonstrating that an artist's life is not always smooth sailing. Yoshihiro Kawamura of The Asahi Shimbun remarked that despite being a moe comedy series, a genuine love for rock music was evident throughout the show. Masafumi Gotoh, lead singer of Asian Kung-Fu Generation, wrote in a personal journal entry that one of the anime's major achievements was "liberating the so-called rock music from certain negative stereotype."

The series' concert sequences and varied visual styles received widespread acclaim from critics. Dupree considered the show to feature "some of the best concert scenes ever put to animation." Motamayor highlighted how the series externalized Hitori's inner world through various techniques, including stop motion, phenakistoscope, and paper craft, alongside comical facial distortions where she transforms into slugs or monsters, making it "one of the funniest and most inventive comedies of the season." Kaeru Inaka of Real Sound noted that while the anime expanded the space between the original four-panel comic strip panels with exaggerated narrative and visual techniques, it simultaneously demonstrated CloverWorks' strength in realistic artwork and nuanced character movement. Naledi Ramphele of Game Rant praised the show for pushing the envelope in animation, noting its dynamic camera work—such as close-ups, wide angles, and low angles—to convey Hitori's anxiety and loneliness, while praising the rich background detail, though noting that background character animations were relatively sparse. Moore stated that the series' visual creativity ranked alongside the third season of Kaguya-sama: Love Is War as one of the best of the year.

=== Accolades ===
In the ninth Anime Trending Awards on February 26, 2023, the anime series was crowned Anime of the Year per the highest popular votes gained and also won seven more categories, such as Best in Soundtrack, Best in Adapted Screenplay, Comedy Anime of the Year, Music Anime of the Year, and Best in Voice Cast. Episode 8 of the series also won Best in Episode Directing and Storyboard. The anime won eight overall awards, the most in awards history so far. The web radio program of the series, Bocchi the Radio!, won three categories in the eighth AniRadi Awards on March 29, 2023, which were Best Comedy Radio, Best Female Radio, and the grand prize Radio of the Year. Yoshino Aoyama was present at the event to receive the award and give a speech.

In the 2023 Musical Instrument Stores Grand Prize, the anime series won the Recommended Works award, voted by the musical instrument store staff around Japan. Instruments related to the series, like Yamaha's PACIFICA611VFM guitar, also won as recommended instruments in the award. In the Newtype Anime Awards on October 28, 2023, the anime series won the Best TV Anime award while winning two other awards: Best Director for Keiichirō Saitō and Best Theme Song for "Seishun Complex" by Kessoku Band.

In the 8th Crunchyroll Anime Awards on March 2, 2024, the anime series won Best Slice of Life. It was nominated for nine other categories including Anime of the Year.

=== Awards and nominations ===
Year	Award	Category	Recipient	Result	Ref.
2022	Reiwa Anisong Awards	Lyrics Award	Ai Higuchi for "That Band" by Kessoku Band	Nominated	
2022	Reiwa Anisong Awards	Arrangement Award	Ritsuo Mitsui for "Seishun Complex" by Kessoku Band	Nominated	
2022	Reiwa Anisong Awards	Character Song Award	"Seishun Complex" by Kessoku Band	Won	
2022	Reiwa Anisong Awards	Character Song Award	"That Band" by Kessoku Band	Nominated	
2022	Reiwa Anisong Awards	Character Song Award	"Guitar, Loneliness and Blue Planet" by Kessoku Band	Nominated	
2023	D-Anime Store Awards	Recommended Anime	Bocchi the Rock!	Won	
2023	D-Anime Store Awards	Hottest Anime	Bocchi the Rock!	Won	
2023	9th Anime Trending Awards	Anime of the Year	Bocchi the Rock!	Won	
2023	9th Anime Trending Awards	Best in Adapted Screenplay	Erika Yoshida	Won	
2023	9th Anime Trending Awards	Best in Episode Directing and Storyboarding	Episode 8: "Bocchi the Rock"	Won	
2023	9th Anime Trending Awards	Best in Soundtrack	Bocchi the Rock!	Won	
2023	9th Anime Trending Awards	Best in Voice Cast	Yoshino Aoyama, Sayumi Suzushiro, Saku Mizuno, and Ikumi Hasegawa	Won	
2023	9th Anime Trending Awards	Comedy Anime of the Year	Bocchi the Rock!	Won	
2023	9th Anime Trending Awards	Music Anime of the Year	Bocchi the Rock!	Won	
2023	9th Anime Trending Awards	Slice of Life Anime of the Year	Bocchi the Rock!	Won	
2023	8th AniRadi Awards	Radio of the Year	Bocchi the Radio!	Won	
2023	8th AniRadi Awards	Best Female Radio	Bocchi the Radio!	Won	
2023	8th AniRadi Awards	Best Comedy Radio	Bocchi the Radio!	Won	
2023	Japan Expo Awards	Daruma for Best Anime	Bocchi the Rock!	Nominated	
2023	Japan Expo Awards	Daruma for Best Director	Bocchi the Rock!	Nominated	
2023	Japan Expo Awards	Daruma for Best Slice of Life Anime	Bocchi the Rock!	Nominated	
2023	Japan Expo Awards	Daruma for Best Original Soundtrack	Bocchi the Rock!	Won	
2023	Japan Expo Awards	Daruma for Best Ending	"What Is Wrong With" by Kessoku Band	Nominated	
2023	Musical Instrument Stores Grand Prize	Recommended Works	Bocchi the Rock!	Won	
2023	Musical Instrument Stores Grand Prize	Guitar Category	Yamaha PACIFICA611VFM (Note: A second guitar model used by Hitori Gotō)	Won	
2023	Musical Instrument Stores Grand Prize	Guitar Category	Epiphone Les Paul Custom/Ebony (Note: A guitar similar to the main Gibson model which Bocchi uses)	3rd place	
2023	Musical Instrument Stores Grand Prize	Bass Category	Yamaha TRB/TRBX (Note: A bass guitar model used by Kikuri Hiroi)	2nd place	
2023	13th Newtype Anime Awards	Best Work (TV/Streaming)	Bocchi the Rock!	Won	
2023	13th Newtype Anime Awards	Best Character (Female)	Hitori Gotō	3rd place	
2023	13th Newtype Anime Awards	Best Character (Female)	Nijika Ijichi	6th place	
2023	13th Newtype Anime Awards	Best Theme Song	"Seishun Complex" by Kessoku Band	Won	
2023	13th Newtype Anime Awards	Best Theme Song	"Karakara" by Kessoku Band	10th place	
2023	13th Newtype Anime Awards	Best Soundtrack	Tomoki Kikuya	3rd place	
2023	13th Newtype Anime Awards	Best Director	Keiichirō Saitō	Won	
2023	13th Newtype Anime Awards	Best Character Design	Kerorira	2nd place	
2023	13th Newtype Anime Awards	Best Mechanical Design	Bocchi the Rock!	2nd place	
2023	IGN Awards	Best Anime Series	Bocchi the Rock!	Runner-up	
2024	8th Crunchyroll Anime Awards	Anime of the Year	Bocchi the Rock!	Nominated	
2024	8th Crunchyroll Anime Awards	Best Main Character	Hitori "Bocchi" Gotoh	Nominated	
2024	8th Crunchyroll Anime Awards	"Must Protect at All Costs" Character	Hitori "Bocchi" Gotoh	Nominated	
2024	8th Crunchyroll Anime Awards	Best Director	Keiichirō Saito	Nominated	
2024	8th Crunchyroll Anime Awards	Best Comedy	Bocchi the Rock!	Nominated	
2024	8th Crunchyroll Anime Awards	Best Slice of Life	Bocchi the Rock!	Won	
2024	8th Crunchyroll Anime Awards	Best New Series	Bocchi the Rock!	Nominated	
2024	8th Crunchyroll Anime Awards	Best Score	Tomoki Kikuya	Nominated	
2024	8th Crunchyroll Anime Awards	Best Anime Song	"Seishun Complex" by Kessoku Band	Nominated	
2024	8th Crunchyroll Anime Awards	Best Voice Artist Performance (Japanese)	Yoshino Aoyama as Hitori Gotō	Nominated	
2024	18th Seiyu Awards	Singing Award	Kessoku Band	Won	
2024	16th CD Shop Awards	Grand Prix (Blue)	Kessoku Band	Nominated	
2024	16th CD Shop Awards	Finalist Award	Kessoku Band	Won	
2024	14th Newtype Anime Awards	Best Theme Song	"Shine as Usual" by Kessoku Band for Bocchi the Rock! Re:	Won	
2025	39th Japan Gold Disc Awards	Animation Album of the Year	Re:Kessoku Band	Won	
2025	15th Newtype Anime Awards	Best Work (Theatrical)	Bocchi the Rock! Re:Re:	Won	
2025	15th Newtype Anime Awards	Best Character (Female)	Hitori Gotō for Bocchi the Rock! Re:Re:	Won	
2025	15th Newtype Anime Awards	Best Soundtrack	Tomoki Kikuya for Bocchi the Rock! Re:Re:	Won	
2025	15th Newtype Anime Awards	Best Character Design	Kerorira for Bocchi the Rock! Re:Re:	Won	
