= Zaq =

- ZAQ at Cosplay Mania 2026

Background information
- Born: March 16, 1988 (age 38); Kagoshima Prefecture, Japan
- Genre: Anime song
- Occupations: Singer, lyricist, composer, arranger
- Instruments: Vocals, keyboards, piano
- Years active: 2012–present
- Label: Lantis
- Website: ameblo.jp/zaq-mikaduki-lab/

Zaq (stylized in all caps, born March 16, 1988) is a Japanese singer, lyricist, composer and arranger signed to Lantis.

== Biography ==
Text logo of ZAQ

Zaq began to learn the piano at age three. During her college years, her idol was Minori Chihara, and it was during this time she decided to become a singer. However, she failed all her auditions. In junior high school, Zaq's favorite bands were Mongol800 and Going Steady, two rock groups which she was addicted to. She is self-taught in composing and her works were characterized by a unique style which is unrestricted by music theory and musicology.

She started writing songs for other artists in 2012, and made her solo debut with Lantis with the single "Sparkling Daydream" released on October 24, 2012; the title song is used as the opening theme to the 2012 anime series Love, Chunibyo & Other Delusions. Her second single "Alteration" was released on January 23, 2013, and the title song is used as the opening theme to the 2013 anime series Sasami-san@Ganbaranai. She released two more singles in 2013, which are "Gekijouron" (激情論) and "Extra Revolution" (エキストラレボリューション). They were released on October 21 and 23, 2014, respectively, and were used as the second opening theme for High School DxD New and the opening theme for I Couldn't Become a Hero, So I Reluctantly Decided to Get a Job.

On January 29, 2014, Zaq released her fifth single, "Voice", which is used as the opening theme for the second season of Love, Chunibyo & Other Delusions. On April 16, 2014, she released her first album, Noisy Lab.. She then again released another single, "Overdriver" on August 20, 2014, and is used for the anime Rail Wars! as the ending theme.

On June 12, 2016, Zaq had her first concert in the United States. This concert was at the Atlantic City Convention Center in New Jersey as part of the AnimeNEXT 2016 convention.

On July 13, 2016, Zaq released her second album No Rule My Rule. It was released in two editions: a standard edition, and a limited edition which includes a music video, a making-of video, and recordings of live performances. Her third album Z-One was released on May 16, 2018.

In 2025, Zaq released the song "Dramatic Overlay" (ドラマチック・オーバーレイ, Doramachikku Ōbārei), which was used as the opening theme to the anime television series Alma-chan Wants to Be a Family!.

== Discography ==
=== Albums ===
Year	Album details	Peak Oricon chart positions
2014	Noisy Lab.: Released: April 16, 2014; Label: Lantis (LACA-15378); Format: CD	8
2016	No Rule My Rule: Released: July 13, 2016; Label: Lantis (LACA-15570); Format: CD	32
2018	Z-One: Released: May 16, 2018; Label: Lantis (LACA-35717)	43

=== Singles ===
Year	Song	Peak Oricon chart positions	Album
2012	"Sparkling Daydream"	8	NOISY Lab.
2013	"Alteration"	25	NOISY Lab.
2013	"Gekijouron" (激情論)	61	NOISY Lab.
2013	"Extra Revolution" (エキストラレボリューション)	36	NOISY Lab.
2014	"Voice"	21	NOISY Lab.
2014	"Overdriver"	45	No Rule My Rule
2014	"Seven Doors"	35	No Rule My Rule
2015	"Philosophy of Dear World"	46	No Rule My Rule
2015	"Katararezutomo" (カタラレズトモ)	47	No Rule My Rule
2016	"Hopeness"	39	No Rule My Rule
2016	"Wareru Dōkoku" (割レル慟哭; "Split Barrel Wailing")	59	No Rule My Rule
2016	"Serendipity"	59	Z-ONE
2017	"Last Proof"	51	Z-ONE
2017	"Caste Room" (カーストルーム)	53	Z-ONE
2017	"Braver"	100	Z-ONE

=== Other anime songs (composed or sung) ===
- Love, Chunibyo & Other Delusions
  - Black Raison d'être (Maaya Uchida, Chinatsu Akasaki, Azumi Asakura and Sumire Uesaka):
    - "Inside Identity"
    - "Outsider"
    - "Secret Survivor"
    - "Van!shment Th!s World"
    - "February Magic"
  - Rikka Takanashi (Maaya Uchida):
    - "Ragnarok's Awakening -Dark Revelation-" (覚醒ラグナロク -暗黒黙示録-)
    - "-Across the line"
  - "Deinaba yotte☆Masarimo" (でいなばよって☆マサリモ) by Shinka Nibutani (Chinatsu Akasaki)
  - "Napping Club Diary" (ひるねぶ Diary) by Kumin Tsuyuri (Azumi Asakura)
  - "Dark Death Decoration" by Sanae Dekomori (Sumire Uesaka)
  - Zaq:
    - "To You" (君へ)
    - "Polluted Arc Sect of Overlord Dance in the Jet Black" (漆黒に躍る弧濁覇王節)
    - "Seed of the Beginning" (始まりの種)
    - "By Your Side" (君のとなりに)
    - "Horror Carnival Dancing in the Abyss" (深淵に舞う戦慄謝肉祭)
- Future Diary
  - "Seigi Sentai Go 12th!!" (正義戦隊ゴ12th!!) by Yoshihisa Kawahara
- Hidamari Sketch x Honeycomb
  - "Open Canvas" (おーぷん☆きゃんばす) by Kana Asumi, Kaori Mizuhashi, Yūko Gotō, Ryōko Shintani, Chiaki Omigawa and Hitomi Harada
- Saki Achiga-hen episode of Side-A
  - "SquarePanicSerenade" by Aoi Yūki, Nao Tōyama, Kana Hanazawa, Mako and Yumi Uchiyama
  - "Futuristic Player" by Miyuki Hashimoto
  - "Yes!! Ready to Play" and "Magical Mahjong World ver. Shizuno" (まじかる☆まーじゃん☆わーるど ver.穏乃) by Aoi Yūki
  - "Live A-Life" and "Magical Mahjong World ver. Ako" (まじかる☆まーじゃん☆わーるど ver.憧) by Nao Tōyama
  - "Dragon Magic" and "Magical Mahjong World ver. Kuro" (まじかる☆まーじゃん☆わーるど ver.玄) by Kana Hanazawa
  - "Mahjong Attaka Pop" (麻雀あったかぽっぷ) and "Magical Mahjong World ver. Yū" (まじかる☆まーじゃん☆わーるど ver.宥) by Mako
  - "Next Legend" and "Magical Mahjong World ver. Arata" (まじかる☆まーじゃん☆わーるど ver.灼) by Yumi Uchiyama
  - "One Vision" and "Tōnan Seihoku Uchidaore World ver. Toki" (東南西北☆うちだおれ☆わーるど ver.怜) by Yui Ogura
  - "Little Pray" and "Tōnan Seihoku Uchidaore World ver. Ryūka" by Kaori Ishihara
- So, I Can't Play H!
  - "Reason why XXX" by Sayaka Sasaki
- Non Non Biyori
  - "Non Non Biyori" (のんのん日和) by Rie Murakawa, Ayane Sakura, Kana Asumi and Kotori Koiwai
  - "Okaeri" (おかえり) by Rie Murakawa, Ayane Sakura, Kana Asumi and Kotori Koiwai
  - "Tadaima" (ただいま) by Rie Murakawa, Ayane Sakura, Kana Asumi and Kotori Koiwai
- D4DJ
  - "Love!Hug!Groovy!!" by D4DJ All Stars (with Shunryu)
  - "Direct Drive!" and "Honest -happy a word-" by Happy Around!
- Bocchi The Rock!
  - "Secret Base" (ひみつ基地, Himitsu Kichi)
  - "Guitar, Loneliness and Blue Planet" (ギターと孤独と蒼い惑星, Gitā to Kodoku to Aoi Hoshi)
  - "I Can't Sing a Love Song" (ラブソングが歌えない, Rabu Songu ga Utaenai)
  - "Never Forget" (忘れてやらない, Wasurete Yaranai)
- Bad Girl
  - "Bad Surprise" by Tenrogun (天狼群) (Azusa Tachibana, Niina Hanamiya, Misato Matsuoka, and Miharu Hanai)
