= Bocchi the Rock! =

Japanese manga series

- First tankōbon volume cover, featuring Hitori Gotō

ぼっち・ざ・ろっく！ (Botchi Za Rokku!)
- Genre: Comedy; Music; Slice of life
- Manga
- Written by: Aki Hamazi
- Published by: Houbunsha
- English publisher: NA: Yen Press
- Magazine: Manga Time Kirara Max
- Original run: December 19, 2017 – present
- Volumes: 8
- Manga

Bocchi the Rock! Side Story: Kikuri Hiroi's Heavy-Drinking Diary
- Written by: Kumichou
- Published by: Houbunsha
- English publisher: NA: Yen Press
- Magazine: Comic Fuz
- Original run: July 9, 2023 – present
- Volumes: 7
- Anime television series
- Bocchi the Rock! (2022–present)
- icon

Bocchi the Rock! (Japanese: ぼっち・ざ・ろっく！, Hepburn: Botchi Za Rokku!) is a Japanese four-panel manga series written and illustrated by Aki Hamazi. It has been serialized in Houbunsha's seinen manga magazine Manga Time Kirara Max since December 2017. Its chapters have been collected in eight tankōbon volumes as of November 2025. A spin-off manga series, titled Bocchi the Rock! Side Story: Kikuri Hiroi's Heavy-Drinking Diary, began publication in July 2023.

An anime television series adaptation produced by CloverWorks aired from October to December 2022. The anime has contributed to the series's sudden growth in popularity as it has received widespread critical acclaim in many aspects, including animation, writing, music, voice acting, humor and exploration of social anxiety. A second season has been announced. A prequel film, Eiga Bocchi the Rock! Hoshi no Ashiato, is set to release in 2027.

== Premise ==
Hitori Gotō, called Bocchi-chan by her bandmates, is extremely anxious and socially awkward. She longs to start a band in spite of her struggles to fulfill her desires to become popular. She is suddenly given a chance to do so after she is taken in by another girl, Nijika Ijichi, to become a member of her newly formed Kessoku Band.

== Characters ==
=== Kessoku Band ===
The logo of Kessoku Band

Kessoku Band (結束バンド, Kessoku Bando; lit. "zip tie", a pun on "unity band") is the central band in the series, based in Starry, a live house in Shimokitazawa. The members' family names are derived from the real-life J-rock band Asian Kung-Fu Generation, with their instrumental roles matching as well. (Note: The guitarist roles of both Gotōs and Kitas are switched around, with Gotō taking up lead compared to Masafumi's rhythm, and Kita taking up rhythm compared to Kensuke's lead.)

Hitori Gotō (後藤 ひとり, Gotō Hitori) / Bocchi (ぼっち, Botchi)
Voiced by: Yoshino Aoyama
Portrayed by: Mamo Mamono (stage play)
The main protagonist of the series, she is the lead guitarist and lyricist of Kessoku Band. An extreme introvert with social anxiety who has trouble with most social interactions. Having been inspired by her father and an interview she saw on television, she taught herself to play the guitar in her first year of middle school, thinking this would help her make friends. Despite becoming incredibly skilled at playing guitar and having a small fanbase online (under the alias "Guitarhero"), she still has not been able to make friends as easily until she was dragged into playing with Kessoku Band. Since then, Hitori has gained a few friends and is learning to interact with other people. She is usually seen wearing a pink tracksuit, which she even wears over her school uniform. Her surname comes from Masafumi Gotoh. Her nickname Bocchi is a reference to hitoribocchi (一人ぼっち), a term for being alone. She plays an Ebony Gibson Les Paul Custom electric guitar, and later purchases a Transluscent Black Yamaha Pacifica electric guitar.
Nijika Ijichi (伊地知 虹夏, Ijichi Nijika)
Voiced by: Sayumi Suzushiro
Portrayed by: Miki Ohtake (stage play)
The drummer and leader of Kessoku Band. Her older sister, Seika, runs the live house where they often play. She is kind, cheerful, friendly, and outgoing. She always works to keep the group together and helps Bocchi with her social anxiety the most. Nijika looks up to Seika, since they lost their mother at a young age and their father is rarely at home. Her dream is for Kessoku Band to succeed on behalf of her sister who quit her band, so that her sister's live house becomes more famous. Her surname comes from Kiyoshi Ijichi. She plays a Vintage Red Tama Imperialstar drum kit.
Ryō Yamada (山田 リョウ, Yamada Ryō)
Voiced by: Saku Mizuno
Portrayed by: Karin Osanai (stage play)
The bassist, composer and backup vocalist of Kessoku Band. Aloof, quiet, and mischievous, she has a cool demeanor and an androgynous appearance that attracts other girls, though she prefers solitude. A close friend and classmate of Nijika, Ryō agreed to form a band with her after a falling out with her previous group over creative differences. She is a highly skilled bassist with a deep passion for music, often spending her time browsing record stores and thrift shops. She often spends all of her allowance from her wealthy family on new music equipments, leading her to constantly borrow money and even eat weeds to stave off hunger. Her surname comes from Takahiro Yamada. She plays an Olympic White Fender Precision bass.
Ikuyo Kita (喜多 郁代, Kita Ikuyo)
Voiced by: Ikumi Hasegawa
Portrayed by: Mirai Ohmori (stage play)
The lead vocalist and rhythm guitarist of Kessoku Band, she attends the same high school with Hitori. In contrast to Hitori, she is a cheerful, charismatic extrovert who has an active social life, to the point that her extroversion manifests as an overwhelming aura at times. She initially joined Kessoku Band to get closer to Ryō, whom she has a crush on, but fled after lying about her guitar-playing skills. With Bocchi's help, she becomes a decent guitar player in her own right. She has a strong dislike of her given name as it phonetically sounds the same as "I'm here! Let's go!" (きた行くよ). Her surname comes from Kensuke Kita. She plays a Pelham Blue Gibson Les Paul Junior Doublecut electric guitar.

=== Starry ===
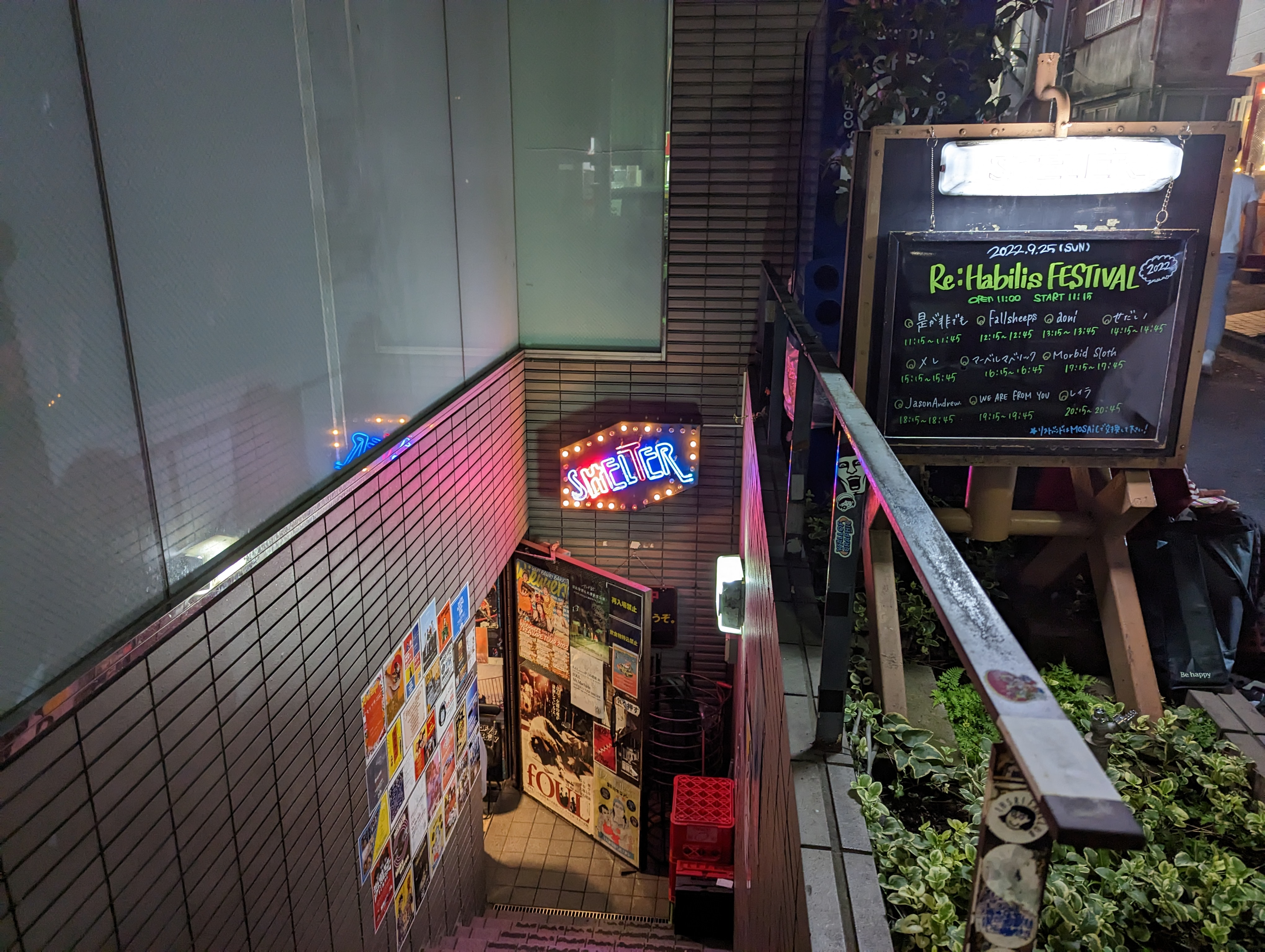
Shelter, the live house located in Shimokitazawa upon which Starry is based

Seika Ijichi (伊地知 星歌, Ijichi Seika)
Voiced by: Maaya Uchida
Portrayed by: Misato Kawauchi (stage play)
Nijika's older sister and the manager of Starry. Professional, serious and aloof with a soft side, she is described by Nijika as a tsundere. During college, she played guitar in a relatively well-known band. She had a strained relationship with her family and often argued with Nijika. After her mother’s death, she aims to fulfill her mother's wish for her to reconcile with Nijika. Seeing Nijika's passion for music, she quits her band and works for eight years to open a live house.
PA-san (PAさん)
Voiced by: Kotori Koiwai
Portrayed by: Haruna Hori (stage play)
The unnamed public address system engineer of Starry. Her intimidating goth style and piercings belie her kind nature.
Nene Ōyama (大山 猫々, Ōyama Nene)
A part-timer in Starry. She is a junior of Hitori and Kita in the same high school. She was inspired to start her own band and play guitar after watching Hitori's performance. She used to play basketball in middle school, and has a boisterous personality, often talking louder than everyone else. Her surname comes from Jun Ōyama from the band Straightener.
Elena Hinata (日向 恵恋奈, Hinata Elena)
A part-timer in Starry. She was part of an idol group as Raphael (ラファエル, Rafaeru) which was disbanded. She finds new passion in obsessively following various bands and musicians, becoming a self-proclaimed music otaku with a particular fixation on Kessoku Band and Ryō. She later joins Ōyama's band as a bassist. Her surname comes from Hidekazu Hinata from the band Straightener.

=== Sick Hack ===
Sick Hack (シク ハック, Shiku Hakku; stylized in all caps) is a psychedelic rock band based in Folt, a live house in Shinjuku. The members share their last names with those of the real-life band 88Kasyo Junrei.

Kikuri Hiroi (廣井 きくり, Hiroi Kikuri)
Voiced by: Sayaka Senbongi
Portrayed by: Rei Tsukikawa (stage play)
The bassist and vocalist of Sick Hack. An alcoholic who spends most of her money on booze, particularly boxes of Onikoroshi brand sake. She plays a Yamaha TRB1004J bass, which she affectionally calls "Shuten-dōji EX." She was formerly a junior of Seika in college. She finds kinship with Hitori after coming from a similarly reclusive personality. Her surname comes from Margarette Hiroi.
Eliza Shimizu (清水 イライザ, Shimizu Iraiza)
Voiced by: Sally Amaki
Portrayed by: Mizuki Saitō (stage play)
The guitarist of Sick Hack who originally came from England. She flew to Japan with the intention of attending a Comiket convention and become a part of an anime cover band. Her surname comes from Katzuya Shimizu.
Shima Iwashita (岩下 志麻, Iwashita Shima)
Voiced by: Maki Kawase
Portrayed by: Miyuna (stage play)
The drummer of Sick Hack. She often helped Kikuri and Eliza resolve the troubles they caused.

=== Sideros ===
Sideros (シデロス, Shiderosu; stylized in all caps) is a metal band also based in Folt, where the members are around the same age as Kessoku Band. They have already gained enough popularity to hold their own solo concerts. The members share their last names with those of the real-life band Kinniku Shōjo Tai.

Yoyoko Ōtsuki (大槻 ヨヨコ, Ōtsuki Yoyoko)
The guitarist, vocalist and leader of Sideros. She looks up to Kikuri, and is highly conscious of Kessoku Band when Kikuri takes interest in them. She is highly competitive and obsessed with rankings and popularity. Despite her confident and aggressive attitude, she is quite insecure and poor at communication skills, causing her to have few friends. She often treats Hitori as a rival, but still gives her and the band advice about music and band activities. After her high school graduation, she enrolls in the same university with Nijika. Her surname comes from Kenji Ōtsuki.
Akubi Hasegawa (長谷川 あくび, Hasegawa Akubi)
The drummer of Sideros. She is the most level-headed member of the band and is friendly to Kessoku Band. Her surname comes from Kōji Hasegawa.
Fūko Honjō (本城 楓子, Honjō Fūko)
The guitarist of Sideros, whose surname comes from Toshiaki Honjō.
Yuyu Uchida (内田 幽々, Uchida Yuyu)
The bassist of Sideros. She dresses in Gothic Lolita fashion and has a deep interest in occultism. Her surname comes from Yūichirō Uchida.

=== Gotō family ===
Naoki Gotō (後藤 直樹, Gotō Naoki)
Voiced by: Junji Majima
Portrayed by: Miki Sawada (stage play, original run), Hirotaka Noda (stage play, re-run and sequel)
Hitori's father, whose face is never shown. When he was younger, he also dreamed of becoming a successful musician. The guitar he owned ended up with his daughter.
Michiyo Gotō (後藤 美智代, Gotō Michiyo)
Voiced by: Rie Suegara
Portrayed by: Mizuki Saitō (stage play)
Hitori's mother. She has a gentle personality and is very accepting of Hitori's social anxiety. She is pleased that Hitori joined Kessoku Band and is able to make friends.
Futari Gotō (後藤 ふたり, Gotō Futari)
Voiced by: Misaki Watada
Portrayed by: Nanami Oka, Arisa Tsukui (stage play)
Hitori's younger sister. She is highly sociable in contrast to Hitori, and sometimes innocently says hurtful things to her. However, she actually loves and cares deeply about her. Her first name, "Futari" translates to two people while her sister's means one person.
JimiHen (ジミヘン, JimiHen)
Voiced by: Kotori Koiwai
The family's Shiba Inu pet dog, named after Jimi Hendrix.

=== Others ===
Fan No.1 and No.2 of Kessoku Band (結束バンドのファン1号・2号)
Voiced by: Kana Ichinose (No.1), Miyuri Shimabukuro (No.2)
Portrayed by: Maon Yajiri (No.1; stage play, original run), Risa Yamazaki (No.1; stage play, re-run and sequel), Hikaru Sonoda (No.2; stage play)
Two girls who bought tickets to Kessoku Band's show at Starry after listening to Bocchi and Kikuri's impromptu street performance in Kanazawa Ward, Yokohama. After that, they attended several of Kessoku Band's performances. Their real names are unknown; the one with long hair is known as No. 1, and the one with short hair is known as No. 2. They are students of the film department of an art university, and Kessoku Band let them assist in the shooting of their music video.
Ginjirō Yoshida (吉田 銀次郎, Yoshida Ginjirō)
Voiced by: Katsuyuki Miura
Portrayed by: Hirotaka Noda (stage play)
The manager of Folt. Even though he looks intimidating, he actually has a girlish side.
Poison Yami (ぽいずん♡やみ, Poizun Yami)
A freelance music writer and part-timer at Stray Beat as an assistant to Miyako. She has a child-like look and initially acts immature to fake her age. She also criticizes Kessoku Band for being "not serious" and believes that Hitori should not waste her talent in the band. However, after witnessing the band's growth and unity, she retracts her statement, gives them an opportunity to debut on a label, and supports the band in multiple ways. Her real name is Aiko Satō (佐藤 愛子, Satō Aiko).
Tsuguko Sasaki (佐々木 次子, Sasaki Tsuguko)
A classmate of Hitori and Kita during their second year of high school. She has been classmate with Kita for five years since middle school. She is impressed by Hitori's guitar performance and tries to befriend her. She always supports Kessoku Band and is the representative of the "Kessoku Band Cheerleading Committee".
Miyako Shiba (司馬 都, Shiba Miyako)
An employee of Stray Beat, a record label. She is in charge of managing Kessoku Band.
Teru Horie (堀江 照, Horie Teru)
Composer of Klimt's Night under the pseudonym Ame with the vocalist, Warabi (ワラビ). The musical duo is under the same label as Kessoku Band. She is a complete shut-in and her social anxiety is worse than Hitori's, partly because she had previously faced multiple accusations of nepotism on social media. She looks up to Hitori as she has been a fan of Guitarhero since their first video and finds comfort and encouragement in watching her improve. She later joins Ōyama's band. Her surname comes from Atsushi Horie from the band Straightener.

== Production ==
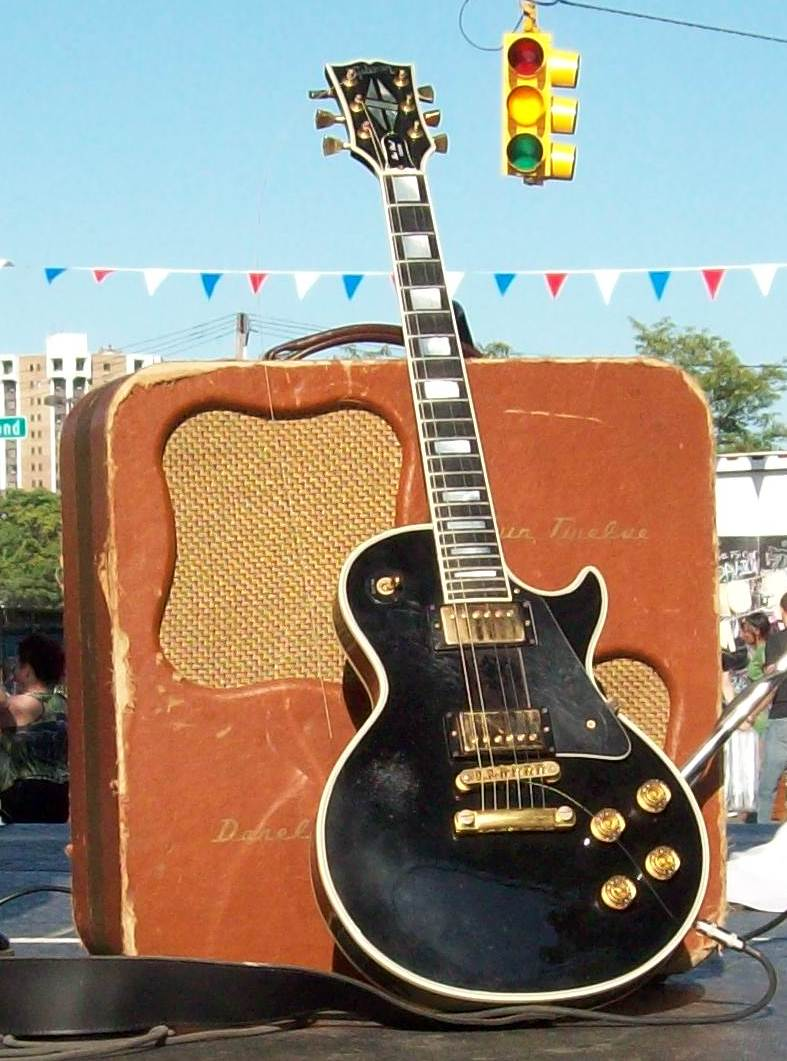
A Gibson Les Paul Custom, the guitar chosen as the initial instrument of main character Hitori Gotō

After finishing with her first title in Manga Time Kirara Max (Kirari Books Meisouchuu), which was mainly about young girls dealing with moe things, Aki Hamazi considered doing a manga about bands next, as listening to bands is one of her favorite hobbies. However, she did not have any actual experience being in a band or playing an instrument prior to the making of the series, so she conducted extensive research by doing things like asking an acquaintance more familiar with the indie band scene, listening and reading more about the culture, and visiting places that are prominent to the scene (like the live house Shelter in Shimokitazawa, which would end up being the model for the live house Starry).

Being aware of the popularity of K-On!, also a Houbunsha-published series with a band setting, Hamazi intentionally set the story around a live house instead of mainly in school to differentiate it. She also admitted using Beck as a reference in making the series as well.

Most of the chapter covers have references to the music videos of Japanese rock bands; most of them would be songs that she liked to listen to, while some others were instead relevant to their respective chapter stories. She also avoided using onomatopoeia or creating lyrics for any of the performance scenes, leaving the finer details of the band's performance to readers' imaginations, although some of the songs do have names originally mentioned in the manga. While the manga is mostly in a four-panel format, in serious moments she intended to have it follow a conventional manga format as well.

In an interview published shortly after the anime finished airing, Hamazi revealed that the designs of most of her characters in the series were purposely done in a simple way; commenting specifically about Bocchi's design, she said she intentionally created a character who doesn't have any fashion sense, and her pink hair color may have been inspired by Kaoruko Moeta from Comic Girls (also a Kirara Max series), although pink-haired characters are common in Kirara titles. She also said that she decided on the color of Bocchi's guitar to be black because of how it made a good balance with the color scheme of her design, but chose a Gibson Les Paul Custom as the exact model of her first guitar because it was the first result when searching for a guitar with that specific color on the internet. She also admitted that Bocchi's personality is a projection of hers and that she relates to Bocchi the most among all characters.

== Media ==
=== Manga ===
==== Main series ====
Bocchi the Rock! is written and illustrated by Aki Hamazi. It was initially serialized in Houbunsha's Manga Time Kirara Max magazine on December 19, 2017, as a guest work. A full serialization started in the same magazine on March 19, 2018. It has been collected in eight tankōbon volumes as of November 27, 2025.

During their Sakura-Con 2023 panel, Yen Press announced that they had licensed the manga for English publication. The first volume was released on October 17, 2023.

The manga also received localisation in Korean by Daewon C.I, in Traditional Chinese by Tong Li Publishing, in Simplified Chinese by Xiron, in Vietnamese by Kim Đồng Publishing House, in French by Meian, in Italian by Ishi Publishing, in Argentina and Spain by Ivrea, in Ukrainian by Mal'opus, and in Indonesian by M&C!.

No.	Original release date	Original ISBN	English release date	English ISBN
1	February 27, 2019	978-4-8322-7072-5	October 17, 2023	978-1-9753-7800-4
2	February 27, 2020	978-4-8322-7170-8	January 23, 2024	978-1-9753-7802-8
3	February 25, 2021	978-4-8322-7252-1	May 21, 2024	978-1-9753-7804-2
4	August 26, 2022	978-4-8322-7388-7	August 20, 2024	978-1-9753-7806-6
5	November 26, 2022	978-4-8322-7419-8	November 19, 2024	978-1-9753-7808-0
6	August 25, 2023	978-4-8322-7477-8	February 18, 2025	979-8-8554-0932-1
7	October 25, 2024	978-4-8322-9581-0	October 28, 2025	979-8-8554-1958-0
8	November 27, 2025	978-4-8322-9677-0	November 24, 2026	979-8-8554-4036-2

==== Spin-offs ====
===== Bocchi the Rock! Comic Anthology =====
A spin-off anthology comic is also being released as Bocchi the Rock! Comic Anthology (ぼっち・ざ・ろっく！アンソロジーコミック, Botchi Za Rokku! Ansorojī Komikku), with six volumes having been released so far.

On February 7, 2025, Yen Press announced that they had licensed the anthology comic for English publication beginning in July 2025.

No.	Original release date	Original ISBN	English release date	English ISBN
1	October 27, 2022	978-4-8322-7414-3	July 22, 2025	979-8-8554-0938-3
2	August 25, 2023	978-4-8322-7480-8	January 20, 2026	979-8-8554-0940-6
3	May 27, 2024	978-4-8322-9550-6	May 26, 2026	979-8-8554-2265-8
4	October 25, 2024	978-4-8322-9583-4	October 27, 2026	979-8-8554-2815-5
5	February 27, 2025	978-4-8322-9614-5	—	—
6	November 27, 2025	978-4-8322-9678-7	—	—

===== Bocchi the Rock! Side Story: Kikuri Hiroi's Heavy-Drinking Diary =====
A spin-off manga series illustrated and with story by Kumichou, titled Bocchi the Rock! Side Story: Kikuri Hiroi's Heavy-Drinking Diary (ぼっち・ざ・ろっく！外伝 廣井きくりの深酒日記, Bocchi the Rock! Gaiden: Hiroi Kikuri no Fukazake Nikki), began serialization on Houbunsha's Comic Fuz website on July 9, 2023. It features supporting character Kikuri Hiroi as the central protagonist. The first volume of the spin-off series was released physically on February 1, 2024, after an early digital release on January 25 that same year.

Yen Press announced that the spin-off series had been licensed as in a pre-panel announcement at New York Comic Con 2024 on October 19, 2024.

No.	Original release date	Original ISBN	English release date	English ISBN
1	February 1, 2024	978-4-8322-0365-5	April 22, 2025	979-8-8554-0936-9
2	April 1, 2024	978-4-8322-0387-7	September 23, 2025	979-8-8554-1585-8
3	October 25, 2024	978-4-8322-0449-2	April 28, 2026	979-8-8554-2263-4
4	February 27, 2025	978-4-8322-0481-2	December 15, 2026	979-8-8554-2384-6
5	June 2, 2025	978-4-8322-0511-6	—	—
6	November 27, 2025	978-4-8322-0565-9	—	—
7	June 1, 2026	978-4-8322-0621-2	—	—
8	December 24, 2026	978-4-8322-0682-3	—	—

=== Anime ===
An anime television series adaptation was announced on February 18, 2021. It was produced by CloverWorks and directed by Keiichirō Saitō, with Yūsuke Yamamoto serving as assistant director, Erika Yoshida writing the series' scripts, Kerorira designing the characters, and Tomoki Kikuya composing the music. The series aired from October 9 to December 25, 2022, on Tokyo MX and other networks. (Note: Tokyo MX listed the series premiere at 24:00 JST on October 8, 2022, which is effectively October 9 at midnight.) Kessoku Band performed the opening theme "Seishun Complex" (青春コンプレックス; Youth Complex), as well as the ending theme "Distortion!!". Crunchyroll streamed the series outside of Asia. Plus Media Networks Asia licensed the series in Southeast Asia and released it on Aniplus Asia and Bilibili. Several web series featuring the voice cast were also produced alongside the anime as cross-promotion.

A second season was announced at Kessoku Band's "We Will B" live event on February 15, 2025. Yūsuke Yamamoto will direct the season, while Keito Oda will serve as character designer with Kerorira.

A new film, titled Eiga Bocchi the Rock! Hoshi no Ashiato (映画ぼっち・ざ・ろっく！ 星のあしあと; Bocchi the Rock! The Movie: Starry Footprints), was announced on November 1, 2026. It adapts a prequel story from the manga's fifth volume and focuses on the Ijichi sisters. It is directed by Shin Wakabayashi based on a screenplay by Erika Yoshida, with character designs by Yukiko Horiguchi. The film is scheduled to be released in Japan by Animec in 2027.

=== Music ===
The anime series features music performed by its main voice cast under the fictional name Kessoku Band, including the opening theme "Seishun Complex," four ending themes, and several insert songs including "Guitar, Loneliness and Blue Planet", "Never Forget" and "If I Could Be a Constellation". Most tracks were released as digital singles alongside their episode premieres, which culminates in a 14-track full album, Kessoku Band in December 2022 and two original soundtrack volumes. Following the series, Kessoku Band continued releasing new music through subsequent singles, compilation film theme songs, and the mini-album Re:Kessoku Band in 2024. Several live performances were held across Japan and in South Korea and in Japan, featuring the cast members of Kessoku Band.

=== Games ===
The main characters from this series were added to Manga Time Kirara's mobile RPG game Kirara Fantasia shortly after the first anime episode premiered. All characters are voiced by their respective anime voice actresses.

The characters from this series were added to the RPG strategy mobile game Kotodaman for a limited period from April 30 to May 10, 2024, as part of the game collaboration with the series.

=== Stage plays ===
A stage play adaptation at the Theater Milano-Za in Tokyo, titled Live Stage "Bocchi the Rock!", ran from August 11–20, 2023. The play is written and directed by Akira Yamazaki. The cast includes Mamo Mamono as Hitori Gotō, Miki Ohtake as Nijika Ijichi, Karin Osanai as Ryō Yamada, and Mirai Ohmori as Ikuyo Kita. The Blu-ray and DVD of the stage play was released on February 28, 2024.

A re-performance and the sequel of the stage play, entitled Part I Starry and Part II Shuka Festival, were slated to be perform at the Theater Milano-Za in Tokyo from September 7–23, 2024. However, due to the poor health of one of the performers, the rerun performances from September 7–9 were cancelled, with the sequel performed from September 14–23 instead. The Blu-ray and DVD of the stage play's re-performance and sequel was released on March 26, 2025.

The first live event by the stage play's bands performed at the KT Zepp Yokohama on June 22 and at Osaka's Zepp Namba on June 30, 2025. A fourth stage play, entitled 2026 Re:boot, performed at the Theater Milano-Za in Tokyo from February 7–23, 2026.

== Reception ==
=== Popularity ===
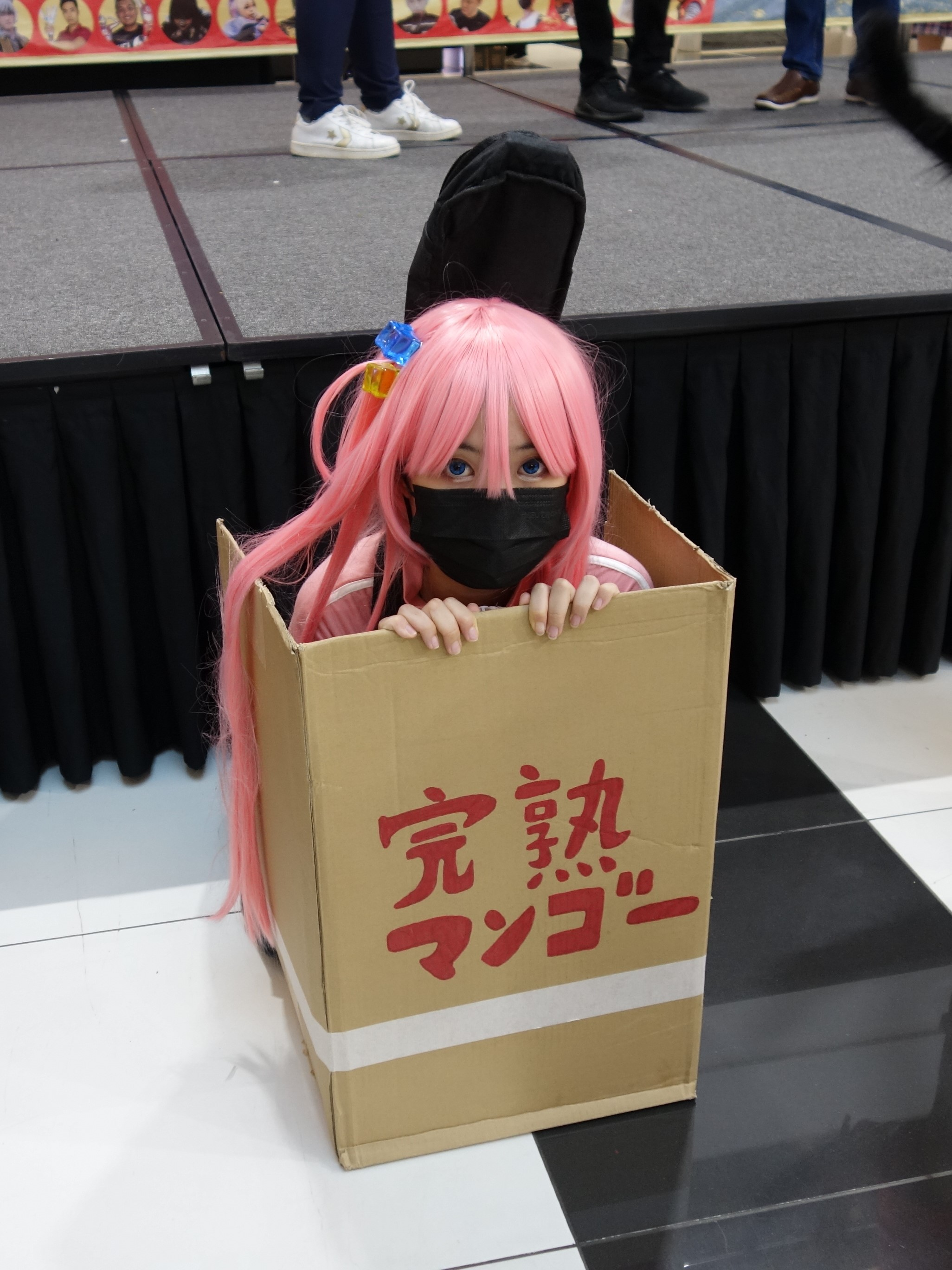
Cosplay of series protagonist Hitori Gotō

The anime was not as highly anticipated by audiences as many more previously established series airing at the same time, such as Chainsaw Man and Mobile Suit Gundam: The Witch from Mercury. However, as the anime progressed, it gained a larger audience due to clips from the anime going viral online.

The series' sudden growth in popularity following the airing of the anime prompted an unexpected influx of fans who formed an excessive line at mangaka Aki Hamazi's booth at Comiket 101 on December 30, 2022, prompting event organizers to direct Hamazi to a different location. Consequently, Hamazi moved her booth outside of the event hall and published a map directing fans to its new location. Wares at Hamazi's booth were exhausted by 12:51 pm that day.

The sales of manga's volumes began to surge around the broadcast of the anime's third episode, which the publisher Houbunsha described as one of the highest growth compared to other anime adaptations. This had caused the volumes to be sold out in various bookstores.

The popularity of the anime also led to skyrocketing demand for musical instruments, especially guitars, where instrument shops recorded a spike of instruments being sold right after the anime ended. Models used specifically by the characters (such as the Gibson Les Paul and Yamaha Pacifica guitars used by Hitori) went out of stock, with no definite restock date. Sales of instruments to beginners also increased (with stocks being depleted in some cases), as many people started to pick up instruments to play due to the series.

Shimokitazawa, particularly the Shelter live house that Starry is based on, also recorded an increase in visitors making otaku pilgrimages to places appearing in the series. The official website of the series subsequently issued a reminder to fans to behave properly when visiting such places and to support paid performances.

Kessoku Band were appointed as Shimokitazawa official ambassadors as part of the town promotion of Shimokitazawa Curry Fest 2023, where food premises around Shimokitazawa offer various curry menus. A stamp rally was held where visitors could redeem merchandise by collecting stamps from purchases.

=== Sales ===
The anime's popularity boosted manga sales as the whole series recorded 202,481 copies sold, earning it twelfth place for most manga sold in the month of December, according to Oricon. Lack of stocks later hampered January sales, but as large reprints replenished stocks in most storebooks, the manga recorded another big sale in February, with 193,348 copies of the whole series sold, the seventh most for that month. The increase in demands and reprints also surged the numbers of circulations of the series, as in January 2023, Houbunsha announced the series had marked one million copies in circulation, not including the digital versions, and subsequently hit 2 million copies in circulation in March. The series hit 3 million copies in circulation in January 2024. It was Yen Press' fifth-best-selling manga title that debuted in 2023.

=== Critical reception ===
Christopher Farris from Anime News Network praised how Hitori Gotō's utter unsuitability for the spotlight fuels the manga's appeal, which turns her relatable struggles into an entertaining showcase of cringe humor. Farris also highlighted the balance of drama and comedy beyond Hitori's personal anxieties and musical talent, such as the broader challenges of building and maintaining a performing band. He noted that while the dense yonkoma format offers substantial value, it occasionally slows down the pacing of the story.

=== Accolades ===
In 2019, the manga series ranked eighth at the fifth Next Manga Awards in the print category, organized by Da Vinci magazine from Media Factory and the Niconico website. The character Hitori Gotō was nominated in the Best Actress category at the Magademy Award 2023. The English release translation by John Neal was nominated for the Japan Society and Anime NYC's first American Manga Awards in the Best Translation category in 2024.
