= Aki Hamazi =

Japanese manga artist

Aki Hamazi (Japanese: はまじあき, Hepburn: Hamaji Aki) is a Japanese manga artist. She is best known as the creator of Bocchi the Rock!, which is adapted into a TV anime in 2022.

== Work ==
- Kirari Books Meisōchū! (きらりブックス迷走中!) (2015–2017)
- Bocchi the Rock! (ぼっち・ざ・ろっく！) (2017–present)
