= Yoshino Aoyama =

Japanese voice actress (born 1996)

- 青山吉能
- Born: May 15, 1996 (age 30); Kumamoto Prefecture, Japan
- Other names: Yoppi (よっぴー, Yoppī)
- Occupation: Voice actress
- Years active: 2014–present
- Agent: 81 Produce
- Notable credits: Wake Up, Girls! as Yoshino Nanase; Love Tyrant as Guri; Shachibato! President, It's Time for Battle! as Makoto; Bocchi the Rock! as Hitori Gotō; Umamusume: Pretty Derby as Tsurumaru Tsuyoshi
- Awards: Special award at the 9th Seiyu Awards
- Musical career
- Genre: J-pop
- Instrument: Vocals
- Years active: 2022–present
- Label: Teichiku Records (Imperial Records)
- Website: www.teichiku.co.jp/artist/aoyama-yoshino/

Yoshino Aoyama (Japanese: 青山吉能, Hepburn: Aoyama Yoshino; born May 15, 1996) is a Japanese voice actress and singer affiliated with 81 Produce. Some of her noteworthy roles include Yoshino Nanase in Wake Up, Girls!, Guri in Love Tyrant, Makoto in Shachibato! President, It's Time for Battle!, Hitori Gotō in Bocchi the Rock!, and Tsurumaru Tsuyoshi in Umamusume: Pretty Derby.

== Biography ==
Aoyama was born in Kumamoto Prefecture on May 15, 1996. In middle school, Aoyama was a member of her school's chorus club, where she spent most of her time. She was also a fan of various manga series, especially Samurai Deeper Kyo. As a result, she decided to pursue a career in voice acting. After attending some open auditions only to not be cast, she was eventually cast as Yoshino Nanase in Wake Up, Girls! via an open audition. In 2015, Aoyama, along with the Wake Up, Girls! voice actor unit, won the special award at the 9th Seiyu Awards.

In March 2020, Aoyama went on hiatus due for medical reasons. She returned to work the next month.

On March 9, 2022, she made her solo singer debut with her first single, "Page". Later that year, she was cast as Hitori Gotō in the anime television series Bocchi the Rock! During the course of the anime's release, Aoyama started learning guitar as part of a project called "Road to Guitar Hero", inspired by her character in the series, eventually learning how to play the anime's opening theme, "Seishun Complex". She later performed the series' last ending theme, "Korogaru Iwa, Kimi ni Asa ga Furu" at the Kessoku Band Live: Kōsei concert in 2023.

She released her first album La Valigia on March 8, 2023. Later that year, she was cast in the role of Dot, also known as Gurumin, in Pokémon Horizons: The Series. In 2024 she voiced the role of Nonoa Miyamae in Alya Sometimes Hides Her Feelings in Russian.

Aoyama is affectionally known as Yoppi.

== Filmography ==
=== TV series ===
2014

- Wake Up, Girls! as Yoshino Nanase

2015

- Hacka Doll as Owner, Yuppy

2016

- Scorching Ping Pong Girls as Yura Yuragi

2017

- Love Tyrant as Guri
- Restaurant to Another World as Tiana Silvario XVI

2019

- The Promised Neverland as Alicia, Mark

2020

- Natsunagu! as Izumi Chiba
- Seton Academy: Join the Pack! as Chroe Mashima
- Shachibato! President, It's Time for Battle! as Makoto
- Deca-Dence as Linmei
- Maesetsu! as Culture Festival Emcee (2)

2021

- 86 as Female Student
- Duel Masters King! as Pyonchiki
- Kageki Shojo!! as Akina Horiguchi
- PuraOre! Pride of Orange as Mami Ono

2022

- Bocchi the Rock! as Hitori Gotō
- Umayuru as Tsurumaru Tsuyoshi

2023

- Pokémon Horizons: The Series as Dot/Gurumin
- Classroom for Heroes as Trois

2024

- The Wrong Way to Use Healing Magic as Ururu
- Yatagarasu: The Raven Does Not Choose Its Master as Fujinami
- Viral Hit as Rumi Meguro
- My Wife Has No Emotion as Akari Kosugi
- Alya Sometimes Hides Her Feelings in Russian as Nonoa Miyamae
- A Nobody's Way Up to an Exploration Hero as Airi Jingūji
- Egumi Legacy as End of the World
- How I Attended an All-Guy's Mixer as Hashibami

2025

- Flower and Asura as Ichijiku Minohara
- Once Upon a Witch's Death as Meg Raspberry
- Food for the Soul as Shinon Ogawa
- April Showers Bring May Flowers as Sumire Uguisudani
- See You Tomorrow at the Food Court as Yamamoto
- Grand Blue Dreaming 2nd Season as Naomi Otoya
- Dealing with Mikadono Sisters Is a Breeze as Miwa Mikadono
- Harmony of Mille-Feuille as Reira Tamaki
- New Panty & Stocking with Garterbelt as Gunsmith Bitch
- Ganglion as Takashi Isobe
- The Dark History of the Reincarnated Villainess as Iana Magnolia

2026

- Wash It All Away as Kuriru Wakasagi
- Agents of the Four Seasons: Dance of Spring as Sakura Himedaka
- Botan Kamiina Fully Blossoms When Drunk as Ibuki Tonami
- Killed Again, Mr. Detective? as Yuriu Haigamine
- Let's Go Kaikigumi as Shurako
- Blue Box 2nd Season as Yumeka Kido
- Suikoden: The Anime as Apple
- The Salty Koharu Has a Soft Spot for Me as Shizuku Misono

2027

- Bless as Oroka Sumeragi
- Dengeki Daisy as Teru Kurebayashi
- 7-nin no Nemuri Hime as Chiara
- Just Like Mona Lisa

=== Theatrical animation ===
2024

- Overlord: The Sacred Kingdom as Neia Baraja

2026

- Cosmic Princess Kaguya! as Roka Ayatsumugi
- Expelled from Paradise: Resonance from the Heart as Danel

=== Video games ===
2018

- Tokimeki Idol as Tsubasa Aoyama

2022

- Umamusume: Pretty Derby as Tsurumaru Tsuyoshi

2023

- Blue Archive as Akeshiro Rumi
- Ys X: Nordics as Rosalind Lazveli
- Azur Lane as USS Kearsarge
- Granblue Fantasy as Noire

2024

- A Certain Magical Index: Imaginary Fest as Rensa #28
- Wuthering Waves as Jinhsi
- Death End Request Code:Z as Sayaka Hiwatari
- Fire Emblem Heroes as Höðr
- Strinova as Eika

2025

- Atelier Yumia: The Alchemist of Memories & the Envisioned Land as Lenja

2027

- Atelier Karia: The Night Kingdom & the Guide of Memories as Lenja

=== Software ===
2021

- Synthesizer V as Koharu Rikka

=== Dubbing ===
2019

- Thomas & Friends as Nia
