= If I Could Be a Constellation =

Single by Kessoku Band
- Language: Japanese
- Released: December 25, 2022
- Genre: J-pop; rock; anime song; character song
- Length: 4:18
- Label: Aniplex
- Songwriter: Ai Higuchi
- Composer: Hidemasa Naito
- Producer: Masaharu Yamanouchi

Kessoku Band singles chronology
"Never Forget" (2022)	"If I Could Be a Constellation" (2022)	"Rockn' Roll, Morning Light Falls on You" (2022)

Music video
- "If I Could Be a Constellation" on YouTube

"If I Could Be a Constellation" (Japanese: 星座になれたら, Hepburn: Seiza ni Naretara) is a song by Kessoku Band, a fictional rock band from the anime television series Bocchi the Rock!. It was released as a digital single by Aniplex on December 25, 2022, and was included in the band's eponymous debut studio album. The song peaked at number 52 on the Billboard Japan Hot 100 and seven on the Oricon Digital Singles Chart.

== Overview ==
"If I Could Be a Constellation" was featured in the twelfth and final episode of the anime television series Bocchi the Rock!, where it was depicted as the last song in Kessoku Band's cultural festival performance. Ai Higuchi wrote the lyrics, while Hidemasa Naito composed the music and Ritsuo Mitsui handled the arrangement. The song was released as a digital single by Aniplex on December 25, 2022. It was included as the twelfth track on Kessoku Band's eponymous debut studio album.

In June 2024, the Recording Industry Association of Japan announced that the song had been certified gold for reaching 50 million streams.

== Personnel ==
Credits adapted from Apple Music

- Ikumi Hasegawa – vocals
- Ai Higuchi – songwriter
- Hidemasa Naito – composer
- Ritsuo Mitsui – electric guitar, arrangement
- Akkin – electric guitar
- Yūichi Takama – bass guitar
- Osamu Hidai – drums
- Masaharu Yamanouchi – producer
- Gen Okamura – mixing engineer, recording engineer
- Mitsuyasu Abe – mastering engineer

== Charts ==
=== Weekly charts ===
Weekly chart performance for "If I Could Be a Constellation"
Chart (2023)	Peak position
Japan (Japan Hot 100)	52
Japan Hot Animation (Billboard Japan)	20
Japan Digital Singles (Oricon)	7

=== Year-end charts ===
Year-end chart performance for "If I Could Be a Constellation"
Chart (2023)	Position
Japan Download Songs (Billboard Japan)	85

== Certifications ==
Certifications for "If I Could Be a Constellation"
Region	Certification	Certified units/sales
Japan (RIAJ)	Gold	50,000,000^{†}
^{†} Streaming-only figures based on certification alone.
