= Seishun Complex =

Single by Kessoku Band
- Language: Japanese
- Released: October 9, 2022
- Genre: J-rock; rock; anime song; character song
- Length: 3:25
- Label: Aniplex
- Songwriter: Ai Higuchi
- Composer: Otoha
- Producer: Gen Okamura

Kessoku Band singles chronology
"Distortion!!" (2022)	"Seishun Complex" (2022)	"Karakara" (2022)

Music video
- "Seishun Complex" on YouTube

"Seishun Complex" (Japanese: 青春コンプレックス, Hepburn: Seishun Konpurekkusu) is a song by Kessoku Band, a fictional rock band from the anime television series Bocchi the Rock!. The song serves as the opening theme for the first season of the series. It was released as a digital single by Aniplex on October 9, 2022, and was included in the band's eponymous debut studio album.

== Background and release ==
On September 14, 2022, Aniplex announced that "Seishun Complex" would be used as the opening theme for the television anime Bocchi the Rock!. The song was released digital single on October 9, 2022, the same day the anime's first episode aired. The lyrics were written by Ai Higuchi, the music was composed by Otaha, and the arrangement was by Tsurō Mitsui.

The CD single was released on October 12, 2022. In addition to the title track "Seishun Complex", it included the new song "Hitoribocchi Tokyo" (ひとりぼっち東京) as its coupling track, along with instrumental versions of both songs. The first-press limited edition also came with a Kessoku Band logo sticker as a bonus.

On March 18, 2023, a studio live video of "Seishun Complex" was screened on large outdoor displays at Yunica Vision in Shinjuku, NAGY in Nagoya, and Dotonbori Station in Osaka. It was uploaded to YouTube the following day.

In November 2023, the song surpassed 50 million streams and was certified Gold for streaming by the Recording Industry Association of Japan. Meanwhile, "Hitoribocchi Tokyo" was used as an insert song in the film Bocchi the Rock! Re:, which premiered on June 7, 2024.

The smartphone music video game The Idolmaster Cinderella Girls: Starlight Stage added a cover version of "Seishun Complex" performed by Syoko Hoshi (voiced by Satsumi Matsuda) on October 30, 2023. On May 7, 2025, Yūho Kitazawa also covered the song as part of the CrossSing cover song project.

== Credits and personnel ==
Seishun Complex

- Ikumi Hasegawa – vocals
- Tsurō Mitsui, akkin – guitars
- Yuichi Takama – bass
- Osamu Hidai – drums

Hitoribocchi Tokyo

- Ikumi Hasegawa – vocals
- Tsurō Mitsui, akkin – guitars
- Yuichi Takama – bass
- Osamu Hidai – drums

== Track listing ==
All lyrics are written by Ai Higuchi.

"Seishun Complex" CD
No.	Title	Music	Length
1.	"Seishun Complex" (青春コンプレックス, Seishun Konpurekkusu)	Otoha	3:25
2.	"Hitoribocchi Tokyo" (ひとりぼっち東京)	Masamichi Nagai	3:53
3.	"Seishun Complex" (Instrumental version)	Otoha	3:25
4.	"Hitoribocchi Tokyo" (Instrumental version)	Masamichi Nagai	3:52
Total length:			14:35
