= Never Forget (Kessoku Band song) =

Single by Kessoku Band
- Language: Japanese
- Released: December 25, 2022
- Genre: J-pop; rock; anime song; character song
- Length: 4:43
- Label: Aniplex
- Songwriter: Zaq
- Composer: Daichi Yoshioka
- Producer: Masaharu Yamanouchi

Kessoku Band singles chronology
"What Is Wrong With" (2022)	"Never Forget" (2022)	"If I Could Be a Constellation" (2022)

Music video
- "Never Forget" on YouTube

"Never Forget" (Japanese: 忘れてやらない, Hepburn: Wasurete Yaranai) is a digital-only single by Kessoku Band, a fictional rock band from the anime television series Bocchi the Rock!. It was released on November 25, 2022 by Aniplex.

== Overview ==
The lyrics of "Never Forget" were written by Zaq, its music composed by Daichi Yoshioka, and arranged by Akkin. is featured in the 12th and final episode of the Japanese anime Bocchi The Rock!, where it was depicted as the first song in Kessoku Band's cultural festival performance. "Never Forget" is included as the 11th track in the Kessoku Band debut studio album after its release on December 25, 2022.

The song was also featured on a limited edition Pink Cassette which was released on August 16, 2024.

== Charts ==
Weekly chart performance for "If I Could Be a Constellation"
Chart (2022)	Peak position
Japan (Japan Hot 100)	85
