= Guitar, Loneliness and Blue Planet =

Single by Kessoku Band
- Language: Japanese
- Released: November 6, 2022
- Genre: J-pop; rock; anime song; character song
- Length: 3:49
- Label: Aniplex
- Songwriter: Zaq
- Composer: Otoha
- Producer: Masaharu Yamanouchi

Kessoku Band singles chronology
"Karakara" (2022)	"Guitar, Loneliness and Blue Planet" (2022)	"That Band" / "What Is Wrong With" (2022)

Music video
- "Guitar, Loneliness and Blue Planet" on YouTube

"Guitar, Loneliness and Blue Planet" (Japanese: ギターと孤独と蒼い惑星, Hepburn: Gitā to Kodoku to Aoi Hoshi) is a song by Kessoku Band, a fictional rock band from the anime television series Bocchi the Rock!. It was released digitally by Aniplex on November 6, 2022.

== Overview ==
The song was written by Zaq, composed by Otoha, and arranged by Akkin. The song appears as an insert song in the fifth episode of the first season of the television anime Bocchi the Rock! and is also Kessoku Band's first original song.

In the story, the song was composed by Ryō Yamada and written by Hitori Gotō. Originally, Hitori intended to write bright, mainstream lyrics that matched Ikuyo Kita's sparkling personality, but ultimately chose to write the lyrics she wanted. The song describes feelings of loneliness and self-doubt on a blue planet, expressing her true self through guitar performance and striving to convey her genuine emotions.

== Reception ==
After the broadcast of episode 5 of the first season of Bocchi the Rock!, "Guitar, Loneliness and Blue Planet" reached No. 1 on the Japanese iTunes anime chart and Japanese LINE MUSIC anime chart.

On June 7, 2024, Ikumi Hasegawa, the voice actress of Kessoku Band vocalist Ikuyo Kita, performed the song on the YouTube channel The First Take. The video surpasses one million views in a single day and reached the fourth place on YouTube's music trending chart.

== Personnel ==
Credits adapted from Apple Music

- Ikumi Hasegawa – vocals
- Zaq – songwriter
- Otoha – composer
- Ritsuo Mitsui – electric guitar
- Akkin – electric guitar, arrangement
- Yūichi Takama – bass guitar
- Osamu Hidai – drums
- Masaharu Yamanouchi – producer
- Gen Okamura – mixing engineer, recording engineer
- Mitsuyasu Abe – mastering engineer

== Charts ==
=== Weekly charts ===
Weekly chart performance for "Guitar, Loneliness and Blue Planet"
Chart (2022)	Peak position
Japan (Japan Hot 100)	59
Japan Hot Animation (Billboard Japan)	19
Japan Digital Singles (Oricon)	5

=== Year-end charts ===
Year-end chart performance for "Guitar, Loneliness and Blue Planet"
Chart (2023)	Position
Japan Heatseekers Songs (Billboard Japan)	17

== Certifications ==
Certifications for "Guitar, Loneliness and Blue Planet"
Region	Certification	Certified units/sales
Japan (RIAJ)	Gold	50,000,000^{†}
^{†} Streaming-only figures based on certification alone.
