= Saku Mizuno =

Japanese voice actress and singer (born 1999)

- 水野 朔
- Born: September 29, 1999 (age 26); Kansai region, Japan
- Occupation: Voice actress
- Years active: 2018–present
- Agent: Haikyō
- Notable work: Selection Project as Rena Hananoi; Bocchi the Rock! as Ryō Yamada; Raven of the Inner Palace as Liu Shouxue
- Website: smavoice.jp/s/sma03/artist/79

Saku Mizuno (水野 朔, Mizuno Saku; born September 29, 1999) is a Japanese voice actress who is affiliated with Haikyō. She made her entertainment debut in 2018, and in 2021 she played her first main anime role as Rena Hananoi in the series Selection Project.

== Career ==
Mizuno was born on September 29, 1999. She started entertainment activities after being a finalist at an audition in 2016. She started a YouTube channel in 2018. In 2020 she played the role of Akira Hirose in the mobile game Baton Relay.

Mizuno played her first main role in an anime in 2021, voicing Rena Hananoi in Selection Project. The following year, she was cast as Ryō Yamada in Bocchi the Rock! and Liu Shouxue in Raven of the Inner Palace.

In 2022, Mizuno became a member of Seiyū E-Sports-bu, a group of Japanese voice actors that are streaming games on YouTube and Tiktok.

Mizuno was previously signed with Sony Music Artists. On April 12, 2025, Mizuno announced that she will be leaving Sony Music Artists on May 31, 2025. She joined Haikyō on June 1, 2025.

== Filmography ==
=== Anime ===
2021

- Osamake as Young Girl (episode 12)
- Selection Project as Rena Hananoi

2022

- The Genius Prince's Guide to Raising a Nation Out of Debt as Server (episode 9)
- Raven of the Inner Palace as Liu Shouxue
- Bocchi the Rock! as Ryō Yamada

2023

- My Daughter Left the Nest and Returned an S-Rank Adventurer as Sasha Bordeaux
- The Vexations of a Shut-In Vampire Princess as Tio Flat

2024

- Oshi no Ko as Koyuki Yoshidomi
- VTuber Legend: How I Went Viral After Forgetting to Turn Off My Stream as Mashiro Irodori

2025

- My Status as an Assassin Obviously Exceeds the Hero's as Amelia Rosequartz
- The Fragrant Flower Blooms with Dignity as Ayumi Sawatari
- Alma-chan Wants to Be a Family! as Hana Yashiki

=== Games ===
2020

- Baton Relay as Akira Hirose
- Monster Strike as Saku Kogiri

2025

- Zenless Zone Zero as Vivian Banshee
- Tower of Fantasy as Lana
