= Eizō Sakuhinshū Vol. 2 =

Eizō Sakuhinshū Vol. 2: Live at Budokan +

Video by ASIAN KUNG-FU GENERATION
- Released: April 20, 2005
- Recorded: November 2, 2004; November 4, 2004; December 5, 2004
- Genre: Indie rock
- Length: 133:00
- Labels: Ki/oon Records; KSBL-5806; KSBL-5807

ASIAN KUNG-FU GENERATION chronology
'Eizō Sakuhinshū Vol. 1' (2004)	Eizō Sakuhinshū Vol. 2: Live at Budokan + (2005)	'Eizō Sakuhinshū Vol. 3' (2007)

Eizō Sakuhinshū Vol. 2: Live at Budokan + is the second video release by Japanese rock band Asian Kung-Fu Generation, released on April 20, 2005, by Ki/oon Records. The two-disc video was also the band's very first live DVD, as the first disc contains live footage of the entirety of the final show of their "Tour Suihai 2004 - No!Member, November-," at Budokan, where they performed before an audience of over 10,000 people on December 5, 2004. The disc retains twenty-two songs, with tracks taken from Kimi Tsunagi Five M, Sol-fa, and Hōkai Amplifier.

The second disc contains clips from the first concert at the Shimokitazawa Shelter Club on November 2, 2004. It also includes a behind-the-scenes documentary directed by Toshiaki Toyoda and filmed at Kanto Gakuin University, where AKG was originally formed, as well as outtakes from the music video for "Kimi to Iu Hana." Upon its release, the video managed to top the Oricon DVD charts for an entire month.

== Track listing ==
All lyrics are written by Masafumi Gotoh, except "Rashinban" by Gotoh and Takahiro Yamada; all music is composed by Masafumi Gotoh, except "Re:Re:" and "Siren" by Gotoh and Takahiro Yamada.

Disc 1: Live at Nippon Budokan
No.	Title	Length
1.	"Opening"
2.	"Shindoukaku"
3.	"Rewrite"
4.	"Sunday"
5.	"Flashback"
6.	"Mirai no Kakera"
7.	"24Ji"
8.	"Re:Re:"
9.	"My World"
10.	"Yoru no Mukou"
11.	"Last Scene"
12.	"Mugen Glider"
13.	"Siren"
14.	"Loop & Loop"
15.	"Understand"
16.	"N.G.S"
17.	"Haruka Kanata"
18.	"Rashinban"
19.	"Kimi to Iu Hana"
20.	"Kaigan Doori"
21.	"12"
22.	"Hold Me Tight"
Total length:		95:33

Disc 2: Live at Shimokitazawa Shelter Club
No.	Title	Length
1.	"Shindoukaku"
2.	"Kimi no Machi Made"
3.	"Entrance"
4.	"Kaigan Doori"
5.	"Kimi to Iu Hana" (live at Kanto Gakuin University)

== Personnel ==
- Masafumi Gotoh – lead vocals, rhythm guitar
- Kensuke Kita – lead guitar, backing vocals
- Takahiro Yamada – bass, backing vocals
- Kiyoshi Ijichi – drums

== Charts ==
Year	Chart	Peak position
2005	Oricon DVD	12
