= Surf Bungaku Kamakura =

Studio album by the Japanese rock band Asian Kung-Fu Generation

Studio album by Asian Kung-Fu Generation
- Released: November 5, 2008
- Recorded: 2006–2008
- Genre: Indie rock, alternative rock, surf rock
- Length: 31:27
- Label: Kioon Music
- Producer: Asian Kung-Fu Generation

Asian Kung-Fu Generation chronology
Mada Minu Ashita ni (2008)	Surf Bungaku Kamakura (2008)	Magic Disk (2010)

Professional ratings
Review scores
Source	Rating
AllMusic	3/5 stars
The Japan Times	(favorable)

Surf Bungaku Kamakura (サーフ ブンガク カマクラ, Sāfu Bungaku Kamakura) is the fifth studio album released by the Japanese rock band Asian Kung-Fu Generation, released on November 5, 2008. The album peaked at the second position on both the Oricon charts and Billboard Japan. Its lead single, "Fujisawa Loser" managed to peak at number five on the Japan Hot 100 and at the number six spot on Oricon. The album's tracks are named after notable stops along the famous Enoshima Electric Railway in order starting from Fujisawa and ending with Kamakura. Additionally, it includes the three b-sides "Enoshima Escalator," "Yuigahama Kite," and "Kugenama Surf" released over the past two years within "Korogaru Iwa, Kimi ni Asa ga Furu," "After Dark," and "Aru Machi no Gunjō" respectively. In promotion of the conceptual album, on November 9, the band held an exclusive live concert within an undisclosed location in Kamakura.

The band has since released a continuation of this album, covering the stations of the Railway line which did not originally have a song. This began with Yanagikōji Parallel Universe, a B-side track to Demachiyanagi Parallel Universe.

== Track listing ==
All songs written and composed by Masafumi Gotoh.

No.	Title	Length
1.	"Fujisawa Loser" (藤沢ルーザー Fujisawa Rūzā)	2:45
2.	"Kugenuma Surf" (鵠沼サーフ Kugenuma Sāfu)	2:28
3.	"Enoshima Escalator" (江ノ島エスカー Enoshima Esukā)	2:39
4.	"Koshigoe Crybaby" (腰越クライベイビー Koshigoe Kuraibeibī)	3:54
5.	"Shichirigahama Skywalk" (七里ヶ浜スカイウォーク Shichirigahama Sukaiwōku)	2:50
6.	"Inamuragasaki Jane" (稲村ヶ崎ジェーン Inamuragasaki Jēn)	3:09
7.	"Gokurakuji Heartbreak" (極楽寺ハートブレイク Gokurakuji Hātobureiku)	2:21
8.	"Hase Suns" (長谷サンズ Hase Sanzu)	2:56
9.	"Yuigahama Kite" (由比ヶ浜カイト Yuigahama Kaito)	3:54
10.	"Kamakura Goodbye" (鎌倉グッドバイ Kamakura Guddobai)	4:31
Total length:		31:27

=== B-sides ===
Song	Length	B-side of
"Hello Hello"	2:45	"Fujisawa Loser"

== Personnel ==
- Masafumi Gotoh – lead vocals, guitar, lyrics
- Kensuke Kita – lead guitar, background vocals
- Takahiro Yamada – bass, background vocals
- Kiyoshi Ijichi – drums
- Asian Kung-Fu Generation – producer
- Kenichi Nakamura – mixing, recording
- Michifumi Onodera – mixing, recording
- Stephen Marcussen – mastering
- Stewart Whitmore – editing
- Yusuke Nakamura – art direction

== Surf Bungaku Kamakura Complete ==
Surf Bungaku Kamakura Complete

Studio album by Asian Kung-Fu Generation
- Released: July 5, 2023
- Genre: Indie rock, alternative rock, surf rock
- Label: Kioon Music
- Producer: Asian Kung-Fu Generation

Asian Kung-Fu Generation chronology
Planet Folks (2022)	Surf Bungaku Kamakura Complete (2023)

Asian Kung-Fu Generation's eleventh studio album, Surf Bungaku Kamakura Complete (サーフ ブンガク カマクラ（完全版）) was released on July 5, 2023. The album contains re-recordings of the original songs and new five songs, also dubbed "complete version" as now it covers every Enoshima Electric Railway station. Two new tracks, "Yanagikouji Parallel Universe" and "Nissaka Down Hill" were already released as B-sides of "Demachiyanagi Parallel Universe" and "Shukuen", respectively.

Three weeks before the release of the full album, the band released an EP called Surf Bungaku Kamakura (half carton) (サーフ ブンガク カマクラ（半カートン）) that included five new songs and an instrumental cover of Caramelman's "Shonan Electro", exclusive on music streaming services.

On the day of release, an Instagram live talk was held on Gotoh and Kiyoshi's Instagram accounts, broadcasting from New Enoshima Aquarium. To promote the new album, the band took a different artist photo at each Enoden station, which were then displayed as posters at the respective stations for a two week period starting from the day prior to release.

== Track listing ==
All songs written and composed by Masafumi Gotoh, except where noted.

Regular edition
No.	Title	Length
1.	"Fujisawa Loser" (藤沢ルーザー Fujisawa Rūzā)	2:45
2.	"Ishigami Hills" (石上ヒルズ Ishigami Hiruzu)	3:21
3.	"Yanagikōji Parallel Universe" (柳小路パラレルユニバース Yanagikōji Parareru Yunibāsu)	2:51
4.	"Kugenuma Surf" (鵠沼サーフ Kugenuma Sāfu)	2:26
5.	"Nishikata Coast Story" (西方コーストストーリー Nishikata Kōsuto Sutōrī)	3:41
6.	"Enoshima Escalator" (江ノ島エスカー Enoshima Esukā)	2:40
7.	"Koshigoe Crybaby" (腰越クライベイビー Koshigoe Kuraibeibī)	3:53
8.	"Nissaka Down Hill" (日坂ダウンヒル Nissaka Daun Hiru)	3:59
9.	"Shichirigahama Skywalk" (七里ヶ浜スカイウォーク Shichirigahama Sukaiwōku)	2:52
10.	"Inamuragasaki Jane" (稲村ヶ崎ジェーン Inamuragasaki Jēn)	3:08
11.	"Gokurakuji Heartbreak" (極楽寺ハートブレイク Gokurakuji Hātobureiku)	2:21
12.	"Hase Suns" (長谷サンズ Hase Sanzu)	2:55
13.	"Yuigahama Kite" (由比ヶ浜カイト Yuigahama Kaito)	3:56
14.	"Wadazuka Wonders" (和田塚ワンダーズ Wadazuka Wandāzu)	4:43
15.	"Kamakura Goodbye" (鎌倉グッドバイ Kamakura Guddobai)	4:33
Total length:		50:11

EP
No.	Title	Music	Length
1.	"Ishigami Hills" (石上ヒルズ Ishigami Hiruzu)		3:21
2.	"Yanagikōji Parallel Universe" (柳小路パラレルユニバース Yanagikōji Parareru Yunibāsu)		2:51
3.	"Nishikata Coast Story" (西方コーストストーリー Nishikata Kōsuto Sutōrī)		3:41
4.	"Nissaka Down Hill" (日坂ダウンヒル Nissaka Daun Hiru)		3:59
5.	"Shonan Electro" (湘南エレクトロ Shōnan Erekutoro)	Shuhei Kina, Toshihiro Kitazawa	1:14
6.	"Wadazuka Wonders" (和田塚ワンダーズ Wadazuka Wandāzu)		4:43
Total length:			19:52

== Chart positions ==
=== Album ===
Chart performance for Surf Bungaku Kamakura
Chart (2008)	Peak position
Japanese Albums (Oricon)	2
Japanese Hot Albums (Billboard Japan)	2

Chart performance for Surf Bungaku Kamakura (Complete)
Chart (2023)	Peak position
Japanese Albums (Oricon)	5
Japanese Combined Albums (Oricon)	5
Japanese Hot Albums (Billboard Japan)	3

=== Single ===
Song	Chart (2008)	Peak positions
"Fujisawa Loser"	Oricon	6
"Fujisawa Loser"	Japan Hot 100	5
"Fujisawa Loser"	Billboard Japan Adult Contemporary	6
