= Easter (Asian Kung-Fu Generation song) =

Single by Asian Kung-Fu Generation

from the album Wonder Future
- Released: March 18, 2015
- Genre: Indie rock, alternative rock
- Length: 3:00
- Label: Ki/oon
- Songwriter(s): Masafumi Gotoh
- Producer(s): Asian Kung-Fu Generation

Asian Kung-Fu Generation singles chronology
"Wake Up!" (2014)	"Easter" (2015)	"Right Now" (2016)

"Easter" (復活祭, Fukkatsusai) is a song by Japanese rock band Asian Kung-Fu Generation. It was released as the lead single of their eighth studio album, Wonder Future, on March 18, 2015. Single's B-side, Seaside Sleeping, sung by band's guitarist, Kensuke Kita. This is the second time since World Apart's B-side, "Uso to Wonderland" in 2006. This is the first time the band didn't use Yusuke Nakamura's artwork on their single, instead they just used the simple artwork with black color because Masafumi Gotoh imagined "Easter" as a grave and resurrection.

== Song meaning ==
"Easter" is about Gotoh's ironic image about Tokyo that look like ghost town and from cultural point of view, it's just a vacant lot. The title taken from Christian festival and holiday, Easter and he hoped that there's right timing to bring us back to something once again, even if it's not festival.

== Music video ==
The music video for "Easter" was directed by Masaki Ōkita. The video presented in black and white, features the band playing in a room with birdcages and Gotoh holding a rooster. The video ends with Gotoh cracking an egg and the curtains closed.

== Track listing ==
All lyrics are written by Masafumi Gotoh

No.	Title	Music	Length
1.	"Easter" (復活祭 Fukkatsusai)	Masafumi Gotoh	3:00
2.	"Parallel World" (パラレルワールド Parareru Wārudo)	Masafumi Gotoh, Kiyoshi Ijichi	2:15
3.	"Seaside Sleeping" (シーサイドスリーピング Shīsaido Surīpingu)	Masafumi Gotoh, Kensuke Kita	3:51
Total length:			9:06

== Charts ==
Year	Chart	Peak position
2015	Oricon	8
2015	Japan Hot 100	8
