= Wake Up! (Tokyo Ska Paradise Orchestra song) =

Single by Tokyo Ska Paradise Orchestra featuring Asian Kung-Fu Generation

from the album Ska Me Forever
- Released: July 2, 2014
- Genre: Ska
- Length: 4:49
- Label: Cutting Edge
- Songwriters: Atsushi Yanaka; Masafumi Gotoh (Lyrics) Takashi Kato (Music)
- Producer: Seiji Kameda

Tokyo Ska Paradise Orchestra singles chronology
"Nagareyuku Sekai no Naka de" (2014)	"Wake Up!" (2014)	"Mekureta Orange" (2015)

Asian Kung-Fu Generation singles chronology
"Ima wo Ikite" (2013)	"Wake Up!" (2014)	"Easter" (2015)

"Wake Up!" is a song by Japanese ska band Tokyo Ska Paradise Orchestra featuring rock band Asian Kung-Fu Generation. It was released as the 3rd part of Tokyo Ska Paradise Orchestra's 25th anniversary project 'Band Collaboration Trilogy' on July 2, 2014. The single's B-side includes a cover of Nat Adderley's "Work Song" and "I Want To Be A Star Which Twinkles Only For You" which was composed by band's keyboardist, Yuichi Oki.

== Music video ==
The video features all members of Tokyo Ska Paradise Orchestra and Asian Kung-Fu Generation. They perform the song in a ballroom set, and pose in different backgrounds with Masafumi Gotoh as the center.

== Track listing ==
Lyrics for "Wake Up!" written by Atsushi Yanaka and Masafumi Gotoh.

CD
No.	Title	Music	Length
1.	"Wake Up!" (featuring Asian Kung-Fu Generation)	Takashi Kato	4:49
2.	"Work Song"	Nat Adderley, Oscar Brown	4:13
3.	"I Want To Be A Star Which Twinkles Only For You"	Yuichi Oki	4:22
4.	"Wake Up!" (instrumental)	Takashi Kato	4:49
Total length:			7:09

DVD
No.	Title	Length
1.	"Wake Up!" (music video)
2.	"Wake Up!" (making of)

Vinyl
No.	Title	Length
1.	"Wake Up!"	4:49
2.	"Work Song"	4:13

== Charts ==
Chart (2014)	Peak positions
Japanese Weekly Singles (Oricon)	9
Japan Hot 100 (Billboard)	14

== Release history ==
Region	Date	Label	Format	Catalog
Japan	2 July 2014	Cutting Edge	CD	CTCR-40362
Japan	2 July 2014	Cutting Edge	CD+DVD	CTCR-40361
Japan	2015	Justa Record	Vinyl	JS7S084
