= Loop & Loop =

Single by Asian Kung-Fu Generation

from the album Sol-fa
- Released: May 19, 2004
- Studio: Folio Sound; Landmark Studio
- Genre: Alternative rock
- Length: 3:45
- Label: Ki/oon; KSCL-919
- Songwriter(s): Masafumi Gotoh
- Producer(s): Asian Kung-Fu Generation

Asian Kung-Fu Generation singles chronology
"Siren" (2004)	"Loop & Loop" (2004)	"Rewrite" (2004)

"Loop & Loop" (ループ&ループ, Rūpu&Rūpu) is a song by the Japanese rock band Asian Kung-Fu Generation. It was the second single released from their second full-length studio album, Sol-fa, on May 19, 2004.

The song was used as the theme song for the drama Dame Nari! and, in the following year, it was used in Osu! Tatakae! Ouendan, a Japanese rhythm game released on Nintendo DS.

== Music video ==
The music video for "Loop & Loop" was co-directed by Kazuyoshi Oku and Masafumi Gotoh. The PV takes place within a classroom populated by four young boys. Over the course of the video, the students ride bikes, play jumprope, and pretend to be a band using brooms for guitars. All the while, they listen to headphones and lip-sync the lyrics to the song. In Eizō Sakuhinshū Vol. 1, it showed the boy at the beginning listening to CD called Romance (ロマンス) by Takamitsu Shibuyama (渋山貴光) (Takahiro Yamada's pseudonym) and at the end, it change with Loop & Loop's cover. However, they cut the both scenes in their official Youtube.

== Track listing ==
All lyrics are written by Masafumi Gotoh; all music is composed by Masafumi Gotoh, except "Rashinban" by Gotoh and Takahiro Yamada

No.	Title	Length
1.	"Loop & Loop" (ループ&ループ Rūpu&Rūpu)	3:45
2.	"Entrance" (エントランス Entoransu) (live)	4:12
3.	"Rashinban" (羅針盤 Compass) (live)	2:39
Total length:		10:36

== Personnel ==
- Masafumi Gotoh – lead vocals, rhythm guitar
- Kensuke Kita – lead guitar, background vocals
- Takahiro Yamada – bass guitar, background vocals
- Kiyoshi Ijichi – drums
- Asian Kung-Fu Generation – producer
- Tohru Takayama – mixing
- Mitsuharu Harada – mastering
- Kenichi Nakamura – recording
- Yusuke Nakamura – single cover art

== Charts ==
Year	Chart	Peak position
2004	Oricon	8
