= World World World (Asian Kung-Fu Generation album) =

Studio album by Asian Kung-Fu Generation
- Released: March 5, 2008
- Recorded: 2006–2008
- Genre: Indie rock, alternative rock, pop punk
- Length: 44:09
- Label: Kioon
- Producer: Asian Kung-Fu Generation

Asian Kung-Fu Generation chronology
Feedback File (2006)	World World World (2008)	Mada Minu Ashita ni (2008)

Singles from World World World
- 1. "Aru Machi no Gunjō" Released: November 29, 2006; 2. "After Dark" Released: November 7, 2007; 3. "Korogaru Iwa, Kimi ni Asa ga Furu" Released: February 6, 2008

Professional ratings
Review scores
Source	Rating
Allmusic	4/5 stars

World World World (ワールド ワールド ワールド; Wārudo Wārudo Wārudo) is the fourth studio album by Japanese rock band Asian Kung-Fu Generation, released on March 5, 2008.

== Release ==
Unlike the band's previous yearly studio albums, the conception and release of World World World spanned almost two years. The album's lead single, "Aru Machi no Gunjō," was released in November 2006, and after spending nearly the entirety of 2007 touring and performing at festivals, AKFG ended the year with the release of its second single, "After Dark." The third and final single, "Korogaru Iwa, Kimi ni Asa ga Furu" was released a month prior to the album's drop.

Despite the significant time span between the releases, both the LP and all three singles were well received. Alongside World World World debuting at number one on the Oricon chart, AKFG was once more selected to produce the opening theme for yet another highly popular anime series, with "After Dark" being chosen as the seventh opening of Bleach.

== Track listing ==
No.	Title	Length
1.	"World World World" (ワールド ワールド ワールド Wārudo Wārudo Wārudo)	1:18
2.	"After Dark" (アフターダーク "Afutā Dāku")	3:12
3.	"Tabidatsu Kimi e" (旅立つ君へ "To You, The Departing")	2:49
4.	"Neoteny" (ネオテニー Neotenī)	4:43
5.	"Travelogue" (トラベログ Toraberogu)	4:07
6.	"No.9" (Number Nine)	3:33
7.	"Night Diving" (ナイトダイビング Naitodaibingu)	3:02
8.	"Laika" (ライカ Raika)	3:52
9.	"Wakusei" (惑星 Planet)	4:01
10.	"Korogaru Iwa, Kimi ni Asa ga Furu" (転がる岩、君に朝が降る Rock and Roll, Morning Light Falls on You)	4:38
11.	"World World" (ワールド ワールド Wārudo Wārudo)	1:21
12.	"Aru Machi no Gunjō" (或る街の群青 A Town in Blue)	4:16
13.	"Atarashii Sekai" (新しい世界 New World)	3:18
Total length:		44:09

== Personnel ==
- Masafumi Gotō – lead vocals, guitar, lyrics
- Kensuke Kita – lead guitar, background vocals
- Takahiro Yamada – bass, background vocals
- Kiyoshi Ijichi – drums
- Asian Kung-Fu Generation – producer
- Yusuke Nakamura – art direction

== Chart positions ==
=== Album ===
Year	Chart	Peak positions
2008	Oricon	1
2008	World Chart	7
2008	Billboard Japan	1

=== Singles ===
Year	Song	Peak positions
Year	Song	Oricon
2006	"Aru Machi no Gunjō"	4
2007	"After Dark"	5
2008	"Korogaru Iwa, Kimi ni Asa ga Furu"	6
