= Fullmetal Alchemist the Movie: Conqueror of Shamballa =

2005 film by Seiji Mizushima

- Theatrical release poster
- Kanji: 劇場版 鋼の錬金術師 シャンバラを征く者
- Revised Hepburn: Gekijōban Hagane no Renkinjutsushi: Shanbara o Yuku Mono
- Directed by: Seiji Mizushima
- Screenplay by: Shō Aikawa
- Story by: Shō Aikawa
- Based on: Fullmetal Alchemist by Hiromu Arakawa
- Produced by: Masahiko Minami; Hirō Maruyama; Ryo Ōyama; Nobuyuki Kurashige; Tsuyoshi Yoshida; Arimasa Okada; Yukio Yoshimura; Kenji Komatsu; Haruhito Yamazaki
- Starring: Romi Park; Rie Kugimiya; Megumi Toyoguchi; Tōru Ōkawa; Kenji Utsumi; Michiko Neya; Keiji Fujiwara; Kotono Mitsuishi; Masashi Ebara; Unshō Ishizuka; Hidekatsu Shibata; Miyoko Asō; Masane Tsukayama; Shun Oguri; Miyuu Sawai; Kazuko Katō
- Cinematography: Susumu Fukushi
- Edited by: Hiroaki Itabe
- Music by: Michiru Oshima
- Production company: Bones
- Distributed by: Shochiku
- Release date: July 23, 2005 (Japan)
- Running time: 105 minutes
- Country: Japan
- Language: Japanese
- Box office: ¥1.22 billion (Japan)

Fullmetal Alchemist the Movie: Conqueror of Shamballa (Japanese: 劇場版 鋼の錬金術師 シャンバラを征く者, Hepburn: Gekijōban Hagane no Renkinjutsushi: Shanbara o Yuku Mono) is a 2005 Japanese animated science fantasy action film directed by Seiji Mizushima and written by Sho Aikawa. The film is a direct sequel and conclusion to the original Fullmetal Alchemist television series which loosely adapted from the original manga series of the same name by Hiromu Arakawa and published by Square Enix. Conqueror of Shamballa follows alchemist Edward Elric as he attempts to return to his homeworld, having lived for two years in a parallel universe, while his younger brother Alphonse is also trying to reunite with him by any means necessary. Edward's search attracts the attention of the Thule Society, which seeks to enter his homeworld, believing it to be Shamballa, to obtain new weapons to help them in World War II.

Conqueror of Shamballa premiered in Japan on July 23, 2005. A CD soundtrack has also been published featuring music from the film developed by Michiru Oshima and L'Arc-en-Ciel. In Japan, it has been edited in a standard DVD, as well as in a limited edition. It was later licensed in North America by Funimation that featured the film in cinemas for a short time, and also released it on DVD and Blu-ray.

Most of the staff from the original Fullmetal Alchemist anime started development on Conqueror of Shamballa shortly after the anime's ending. The original script had to be shortened to fit the film's length of 105 minutes. During its premiere in Japan, Conqueror of Shamballa remained as one of the most popular films in the year. Critical reaction to the film has commonly been positive, with reviews praising the film's story and animation.

== Plot ==
After Edward Elric recovers his arm and his brother Alphonse's body, (Note: As depicted in Fullmetal Alchemist (2003)) Edward is dragged from his homeworld through the Gate of Alchemy—the source of alchemical energy—to a parallel world of Earth in 1923. The world is fundamentally governed by the laws of modern science instead of alchemy. When Edward arrives there, he discovers that he has been stripped of his alchemical powers and his newly restored arm and leg.

Two years later, in Munich, Germany, Edward researches rocketry with his friend Alfons Heiderich, a young man who resembles Alphonse, in the hopes of returning to his world. Edward rescues a persecuted Romani woman named Noah from being sold. Noah, who resembles Ed's friend Rosé, is taken in by Edward to live with him and Alfons, and begins having visions concerning Edward's life in his world. The next day, Edward meets Fritz Lang, a Jewish film director resembling King Bradley, who persuades Edward into helping him hunt down a dragon he has been seeking for inspiration for his next film. The dragon, which turns out to be homunculus Envy, attacks Edward, but is then weakened and captured by members of the Thule Society.

The Thule Society, led by Karl Haushofer and Dietlinde Eckhart, use Envy and Edward's kidnapped father Hohenheim as catalysts to open a portal to Edward's world, believing it to be the utopia Shamballa after learning about it from Hohenheim. A number of armored soldiers are sent through the portal, only to emerge on the other side in the city of Liore as mutated zombie-like creatures. Alphonse, who is visiting Liore, fights off the armored soldiers and merges parts of his soul to three of their suits to aid him in combat. Meanwhile, Edward breaks into the Thule Society headquarters and accidentally reopens the portal, returning the dead armored soldiers to Earth and allowing Alphonse's armored form to briefly reunite with his brother before his soul returns to his body, increasing Edward's determination to return to his world.

Alphonse is guided by the homunculus Wrath to the underground city beneath Amestris' Central City to reopen the Gate of Alchemy. There, they are attacked by the homunculus Gluttony, who fights and mortally wounds Wrath. At Wrath's insistence, Alphonse transmutes and sacrifices the two homunculi to use as material to open the Gate. Meanwhile, in Munich, the Thule Society persuades Noah into guiding them on how to correctly open the Gate based on what she had learned from reading Edward's mind. Edward learns from Lang that the Thule Society plans to use the weapons from his world to help Adolf Hitler in his attempt to start a revolution, and heads to stop them. Hohenheim and Envy are both transmuted at the same time that Alphonse transmutes Gluttony and Wrath. With the Gate opened, Eckhart leads a fleet into the other world, where she gains the ability to use alchemy. However, she begins to go mad with power and fear of her new surroundings and launches an attack on Central City. Alfons launches Edward in a rocket-powered plane to return him to his world before being gunned down.

Edward appears in his world, reunited with Alphonse and their friend Winry Rockbell, who fits Edward with new automail limbs. The Amestris military manages to stop most of Eckhart's soldiers with the help of Roy Mustang. Edward battles Eckhart before Alphonse transmutes parts of his soul to a group of armors, which have her surrounded as her fate by them are unknown. Upon reappearing in her own world, Eckhart is covered with shadow creatures from the Gate and killed by an officer, resembling Mustang's friend, Maes Hughes, out of alarm of her new, monstrous appearance. Understanding the danger posed by the connection between the two worlds, Edward returns to Earth to seal the Gate on the other side, knowing he will be trapped there forever. Instead of sealing the Gate on the other world's side as per Edward's request, however, Alphonse has Mustang seal the Gate and follows Edward to remain with his brother. Following Alfons' funeral, the Elric brothers leave Munich after parting ways with Noah, intending to destroy the weapons meant to be used in Hitler's attack and make their new home a safer place.

== New characters ==
Alfons Heiderich (アルフォンス・ハイデリヒ, Arufonsu Haiderihi)
Voiced by: Shun Oguri (Japanese); Jason Liebrecht (English)
A young German rocket scientist who Edward befriends some time after arriving in Munich. He is similar in name and appearance to Edward's brother, Alphonse. He is easygoing and enjoys listening to Edward's stories of his homeworld, and while he doubts whether or not they are true and is hurt by how distant Edward behaves, he is nonetheless supportive of his efforts. He suffers from a fatal lung disease and hopes to make a difference for the world before he dies. His wish is granted when he helps Edward return to his world through the opened Gate on a rocket before he is fatally shot by Rudolf Hess of the Thule Society.
Dietlinde Eckhart (デートリンデ・エッカルト, Dētorinde Ekkaruto)
Voiced by: Kazuko Katō (Japanese); Kelly Manison (English)
A member of the Thule Society and the main antagonist of the film who is based loosely on real-life Thule Society member Dietrich Eckart. She is an ambitious young woman who desires to open the gate to Edward's world, believing it to be the utopia "Shamballa", so that she may harness the powers and weapons of that world and overthrow Hitler in contrast to her organization's goal to support the Nazi Party. Upon seizing leadership of the Thule Society and entering the other world, however, her lust for power and shallow understanding of alchemy cause her to gradually go mad with fear of her new surroundings and try to destroy Amestris' capital of Central City. When she is forced back into her world, she is covered with shadow creatures from the Gate of Truth and takes on a fearsome appearance, leading her to be shot to death by an officer resembling Maes Hughes.
Noah (ノーア, Nōa)
Voiced by: Miyū Sawai (Japanese); Leah Clark (English)
A young traveling Romani girl who Edward saves from being sold to the Thule Society. On the surface, she is proud of her heritage and lifestyle, but is unable to bear being discriminated for it. She has the ability to read the minds of others, and becomes fascinated with Edward's world after witnessing his memories of it. Believing she wouldn't be discriminated against in Edward's world, Noah assists the Thule Society in opening the Gate based on information from Edward's memories, but relents once Edward points out that his home is no utopia. She parts ways with the Elric brothers by the end of the film to be amongst her people. Noah is also similar in appearance to Rose, a character from the original anime.

Several historic figures appear in supporting roles including Fritz Lang (physically based on King Bradley), Rudolf Hess, Karl Haushofer, and Adolf Hitler. The Earth counterparts of Maes Hughes and his wife Gracia appear in supporting roles, along with cameos from other characters.

== Production ==
Production of the film began shortly after the television series finishing its original broadcasting on Japanese channels, although pre-production started during the show's run in March 2004. The film's production was led by director Seiji Mizushima, who also had directed the series as well. Mizushima allowed a camera crew and interviewers into the show's conference room at the Bones studios where he described how production went, as seen in a special feature on the DVD release of the film. The conference room was filled with every cut and drawing created for the show and movie, but it was eventually cleared out to make room for other projects.

The original draft of the film's script was written by Sho Aikawa at a hundred pages long, making the film over three hours long. Mizushima and others had to cut a third of the script's scenes out in order to make the film an appropriate length. Some scenes and characters were removed from the final cut, including a character named Steiner who could see auras, having a role similar to Noah's. A scene which was cut involved characters Roy Mustang and Winry Rockbell meeting in front of the late Maes Hughes' grave. By October 2004, the script was completed and the pre-check storyboards were produced. The pre-check storyboards showed the movements of objects and characters in each shot along with the characters' lines. Production on the proper storyboards began in November of the same year, but the schedule in producing the film was immensely busy, so the directors of the film split the storyboards into six sections, one for each of the directors to create.

The opening and ending scenes were drawn by Mizushima; the scene involving the debut of the film's villain was drawn by Soichi Masui; the middle section of the film was drawn by Shingo Kaneko; Edward Elric's return to his homeworld was drawn by Masahiro Ando; action scenes were drawn by Shinji Aramaki; and the battle between Wrath and Gluttony was drawn by Yutaka Nakamura. Mizushima was repeatedly harassed by the head employees at Aniplex to speed up work on the storyboards. The artwork for the film was produced once Kaneko was finished and cel-animation was used to produce several characters or items in the film. Seven hundred of the film's animated frames had to be redone with only two weeks to the film's release.

A trailer was produced for the film in December 2004 with Romi Park, the voice actor for Edward Elric, narrating it. Three posters were produced for the film, two teaser posters and a third for the release of the film. A "Fullmetal Festival" was held on December 26, 2004, to celebrate the show and film. Most of the directors finished their assigned storyboards by February 2005 except Shingo Kaneko, who was taking longest due to the general slow process, but his storyboards were nevertheless impressive.

=== Music ===
The film score was composed by Michiru Oshima. L'Arc-en-Ciel gave two of their new songs for the film's opening and closing credits, "Link" and "LOST HEAVEN", respectively. The film's orchestral music was performed by the Moscow Orchestra. "KELAS [LET'S-DANCE]," the song performed by the Romani women while Edward and Heiderich hitch a ride, was composed by Ferenc Snétberger (who also played guitar for the song), with vocals by Tayo Awosusi. A soundtrack CD of the film, Fullmetal Alchemist The Movie Conqueror Of Shamballa OST, which contained forty-six tracks, was released on July 20, 2005. Single CDs of the songs "Link" and "LOST HEAVEN" have also been released by L'Arc-en-Ciel near the film's premier.

== Release and distribution ==
The film premiered in Japan on July 23, 2005. The Japanese DVD as well as the Universal Media Disc were released on January 25, 2006. A limited edition including with a special box, English subtitles and a series of other extras was published on the same date.

Some promotional activity was done before the film was already gone from theaters. The movie trailer was shown to a group of about 300 persons at Shiokazecon in Houston, Texas on April 27, 2006. Vic Mignogna, the English voice actor for Edward Elric, also promoted the film at anime conventions. On February 27, 2006, Funimation announced that they had licensed the film. The movie premiered at Montreal Fantasia's Festival on July 22, 2006. The movie had its American premiere on July 3 at Anime Expo, and was later premiered on September 8 in 40 theaters by Funimation Films. It was announced on the movie's MySpace that the movie was going to be shown again in select theaters on September 20, 2007, but only for one day. During the 2006 Nan Desu Kan anime convention, the film was screened. Seiji Mizushima, director from the film, attended the screening.

Funimation released the English DVD on September 12, 2006, while the limited edition was published on November 14, 2006. Similar to the Japanese version, the English limited edition features several extras such as interviews with the Japanese cast, a video explanation of the film's creation, and an 18-page guidebook featuring character sketches. A special edition featuring extras, a book and cards was published on June 23, 2009. In May 2009, Funimation announced that the film would be released in Blu-ray format. It was released on November 17, 2009, and features the same special features on the limited edition except for the 18-page guidebook.

On February 1, 2016, Funimation announced via its official blog that the company's licensing rights to the film and Fullmetal Alchemist: Brotherhood would expire on March 31, 2016. Effective that date, both the film and the series were no longer available for streaming on Funimation.com, and no further home-video copies of either were produced. As of 2024, the film is only available for streaming on Crunchyroll.

== Reception ==
=== Box office ===
During its premiere, Conqueror of Shamballa ranked 3rd at the Japanese box office. In the second week, it fell to 7th. By next week, it ranked 10th, but it did not appear in the top ten from the following weeks. In the Japanese market, the film's gross revenue summed up to $9,712,635 during 2005. Overseas, it grossed to $10,197,984 during 2005. As of 2007, it grossed to ¥1.22 billion ($10.8 million) in the Japanese box office. It became the seventh most popular anime film released in Japan during 2005. In a theatrical chart from the same year, Conqueror of Shamballa ranked as the seventh best anime film from 2005, and as the 47th best film in overall.

=== Critical response ===
Critical response to the film has generally been positive. Theron Martin from Anime News Network found Conqueror of Shamballa as a very entertaining film "as it has all of the action, flashy magic, comedy, snappy dialogue, drama, and intrigue that made the TV series so great." The few negative points he found about the plot were lack of discussions of morality which were featured in the anime series and that "the writing and plotting just don't feel as sharp as they were for the series." He praised the additional content from the limited edition DVD as well as the English dub, but criticized the subtitles for having grammatical mistakes. Although Dani Moure from Mania Entertainment did not find the story to be very original, he still favored it due to its mix of themes, turning it into an entertaining film. He also praised the staff from the series, commenting they have done an "admirable job," making the film a "sequel well worthy of bearing the series' name." Chris Johnston of Newtype USA praised it is as "a perfect way" to conclude the TV series, saying it is "a rousing, action-packed and heartrending close."

It also received praise by IGN's Jeremy Mullin, who gave it an overall 9 over 10, having had good opinion of the graphics used during the film and how the film expands Fullmetal Alchemist's story. The film was compared to The End of Evangelion due to how both titles expand their anime's endings, resulting in a "proper ending" due to the characters' development featured in the film. Mullin also liked the audio from Conqueror of Shamballa, but added that some of the English voice actors lacked accents. DVD Talk writer Todd Douglass Jr. also liked the film as he was "pleased to report that the story was handled nigh-flawlessly. The inclusion of real world events helps ground the fact that Edward is in our world, but there was just something surreal about that after seeing it." He found the film's ending to be fitting for Fullmetal Alchemist and said it will be well received by fans from the series. While reviewing the special edition DVD, Douglass commented the extras featured in the DVD "are worth the price." However, he also added that "some people just don't care about the extras" and concluded that "this is a strong reissue that could have possibly been better, but is fine just the same."

=== Accolades ===
During the "9th Japanese Media Arts Festival Winners", the film was listed as "recommendable anime". In the Tokyo Anime Fair, the film won in the categories "Animation of the Year", "Best Original Story" (Hiromu Arakawa) and "Best Music" (Michiru Oshima). In an Oricon's survey from 2005, the film's theme song, "Link" by L'Arc-en-Ciel, sold 235,751 copies, ranking as fourth in the "Top 10 Anime Theme Songs of 2005". It also won the "2005 Animation Grand Award" prize in Mainichi Film Awards, and "Best Animated Film" prize in Fantasia International Film Festival (Montreal, Quebec, Canada). During the American Anime Awards, the film was nominated in the category of "Best Anime Feature". The first English DVD was the third bestselling Japanese anime DVD in the United States in 2006 with a sale ratio of 31 compared to the sales of the #1 title as 100. During 2007 the limited edition DVD from the film ranked 23rd with a sales ratio of 23. In the NEO Awards 2007 from Neo, Conqueror of Shamballa won in the category "Best Anime Movie."
