= Fullmetal Alchemist (TV series) =

Japanese anime television series

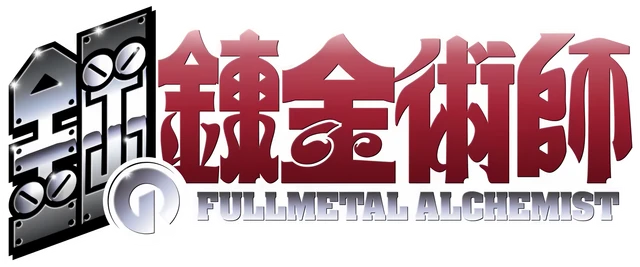
- 鋼の錬金術師; Hagane no Renkinjutsushi
- Type: TV series
- Genre: Adventure; Dark fantasy; Steampunk
- Based on: Fullmetal Alchemist
- Created by: Hiromu Arakawa
- Directed by: Seiji Mizushima
- Series composition: Shō Aikawa (Note: Credited as Story Editor (ストーリーエディター))
- Character designer: Yoshiyuki Itō
- Music by: Michiru Ōshima
- Voices of: Romi Park; Rie Kugimiya; Tōru Ōkawa; Megumi Toyoguchi; Keiji Fujiwara; Michiko Neya; Ryōtarō Okiayu
- Narrated by: Rie Kugimiya
- No. of episodes: 51 (list of episodes)

Production
- Art directors: Kazuyuki Hashimoto; Norifumi Nakamura (6–51)
- Sound director: Masafumi Mima
- Cinematographer: Tōru Fukushi
- Color designer: Shihoko Nakayama
- Editor: Hiroaki Itabe
- Studio: Bones
- Producers: Hiroo Maruyama; Ryo Oyama; Masahiko Minami
- Production companies: Mainichi Broadcasting System; Aniplex; Bones
- Runtime: 23 minutes

Original release
- Networks: MBS, TBS
- Release: October 4, 2003 – October 2, 2004

Related
- Original video animation

Fullmetal Alchemist: Premium Collection
- Directed by: Seiji Mizushima
- Music by: Michiru Ōshima
- Studio: Bones
- Licensed by: NA: Funimation (expired)
- Released: March 29, 2006
- Runtime: 1–6 minutes
- Episodes: 4
- Film
- Conqueror of Shamballa (2005)

Fullmetal Alchemist (Japanese: 鋼の錬金術師, Hepburn: Hagane no Renkinjutsushi) is a Japanese anime television series loosely based on the manga series Fullmetal Alchemist by Hiromu Arakawa. It was produced by Bones, MBS, and Aniplex. The series was directed by Seiji Mizushima, written by Shō Aikawa, and musically composed by Michiru Ōshima.

The anime series aired a total of 51 episodes on MBS, TBS and its affiliates from October 2003 to October 2004. It was originally licensed in North America by Funimation and broadcast English dubbed on Adult Swim in the United States from November 2004 to March 2006. Funimation's license to the series expired in July 2016.

The series follows the adventures of brothers Edward and Alphonse Elric, who are searching for the Philosopher's Stone so they can regain the bodies they lost in a failed attempt to bring their deceased mother back to life. During production of the anime, Arakawa requested a screenwriter-led original ending for the series that differed from the manga, which was still being actively published at the time. This led to the anime deviating into an entirely original story direction around the first dozen episodes. The anime's storyline concluded with a sequel film, subtitled Conqueror of Shamballa, which released in Japanese theaters in July 2005. An anime television series reboot, titled Fullmetal Alchemist: Brotherhood, was broadcast from April 2009 to July 2010.

== Plot ==
The first half of the anime's plot adapts the first six volumes of the manga, while the second half incorporates plot points from the seventh and eighth volumes with significant recontextualizations.

Dante, a former lover of Hohenheim, the Elric brothers' father, and mentor to the boys' teacher, is the series' main antagonist. Centuries ago, Hohenheim and Dante perfected methods for making the Philosopher's Stone and achieved immortality by transferring their souls and intellects into other bodies as they age. Hohenheim was eventually overcome with the guilt of sacrificing lives to make the Stone and left Dante. Although Dante can still jump from body to body with the last stone she and Hohenheim created, she is not willing to risk the rebound of creating one herself. She thus uses the homunculi to encourage Edward and Alphonse, along with other equally desperate Alchemists to create another complete Philosopher's Stone for her.

When Scar creates the Philosopher's Stone, at the cost of his life as well as the lives of 7,000 soldiers, he infuses it into Alphonse's metal body, which leads to Alphonse's kidnapping. Edward tries to rescue him, but is killed by Envy. However, Alphonse uses the Philosopher's Stone to revive his brother but disappears in the process, along with Envy, who fails to stop him. Dante tries to escape, but she is killed when the homunculus Gluttony, whose mind she had earlier destroyed, fails to recognize his master. After being revived, Edward risks his life to bring back his brother and finds himself in Munich, while Alphonse recovers his original body. Determined to reunite with Alphonse, Edward becomes involved in rocketry research, intending to use that technology to return to his home world. The story concludes in the film adaptation Conqueror of Shamballa, in which Edward's search attracts the attention of the Thule Society, which seeks to enter his homeworld—believing it to be Shamballa—to obtain new weapons to help them in World War II. Dietlinde Eckhart, a member of the Thule Society, enters the other world and tries to destroy Amestris. She is defeated by the Elric brothers, who decide to stay in Germany.

== Production ==
Bones president Masahiko Minami decided to create an adaptation of Fullmetal Alchemist after Bones staffers, including Yoshiyuki Ito, brought it to his attention. Bones subsequently secured a deal with author Hiromu Arakawa and publisher Square Enix to produce an anime adaptation.

During the development of the Fullmetal Alchemist anime, Arakawa allowed Bones to work independently from her, and requested they produce an original ending different from that of the then ongoing manga. She did not want to repeat the same ending in both media, and wanted to continue writing the manga to develop the characters at her own pace. When watching the anime's ending, Arakawa stated that she was amazed about how different the homunculi creatures were from her manga and enjoyed how the staff speculated about the origins of the villains. Although she was not fully involved in all aspects of the 2003 series, she was directly involved in the production of it at a storywise standpoint. As shown in the extras of Volume 8 of the manga, she helped the anime's development team with consultation for the characters and telling the overall story she had planned for her manga, helping them fill in some of the gaps to create the anime original ending of the 2003 series. Because Arakawa was involved in the development of the anime, she was kept from focusing on the manga's cover illustrations and had little time to illustrate them.

== Broadcast and release ==
The animation studio Bones adapted the manga into a 51-episode anime series. It was directed by Seiji Mizushima, written by Shō Aikawa and co-produced by Mainichi Broadcasting System, Aniplex and Bones. Characters were designed by Yoshiyuki Itō. The anime premiered on MBS, TBS, and Animax in Japan from October 4, 2003; it ran until October 2, 2004, with a 6.8 percent television viewership rating. During the making of the anime, Arakawa was present in meetings to advise the staff about the world of Fullmetal Alchemist, though she did not write for the television series. The series has been released as thirteen DVDs from December 17, 2003, to January 26, 2005, in Japan by Aniplex. During January 2009, Bones released a "DVD box archives" of the series. It includes the fifty-one episodes, the film, the CD soundtracks, and guidebooks from the series.

The English dubbed version of the anime was produced by Funimation and debuted on Adult Swim in the United States on November 6, 2004. Canada's YTV began airing it on March 3, 2006. In the United Kingdom, the anime was broadcast by Rapture TV and AnimeCentral. Animax Asia broadcast the series in the Philippines, India, and South Asia.

Funimation released the series in 13 DVD sets from February 8, 2005, to September 12, 2006. Funimation later re-released the series into two DVD volumes in 2009 and again in 2010. In the United Kingdom, MVM Films distributed the first eight volumes of the series. However, Funimation gave the rights over to Revelation Films, who released the final five volumes. In December 2015, Anime Limited announced its acquisition of the series's rights in the UK and released it in two collector's edition Blu-ray sets in 2016. In Australia and New Zealand, Madman Entertainment originally released the series on 13 volumes, before re-releasing the series in two DVD volume collections, and later on a Blu-ray boxset.

A series of five original video animations (OVAs) were also released. Most of these are side stories and do not expand on the plot. In March 2006, a DVD featuring these OVAs was released in Japan as Fullmetal Alchemist: Premium Collection. Funimation acquired and dubbed the "Premium Collection" in late 2008 for English release. The DVD was released in English on August 4, 2009.

Funimation lost its home video and streaming rights for the Conqueror of Shamballa on March 31, 2016, and the anime on July 31 of that same year. Netflix began streaming the series on January 1, 2018, and removed it on December 31, 2021. The series has not been available on any legal streaming platform since then.

=== Film ===
A film sequel to the 2003 series, Fullmetal Alchemist the Movie: Conqueror of Shamballa, was produced by Bones and premiered in Japanese theaters on July 23, 2005. The film follows Edward Elric's attempts to return to his homeworld, having lived for two years in our world—which exists in a universe parallel to his own—while Alphonse is equally determined to reunite with his brother.

=== Music and soundtracks ===
The music for Fullmetal Alchemist was composed and arranged by Michiru Ōshima and recorded at Mosfilm by the Moscow Symphony Orchestra in Russia. Russian Japanologist-turned-cosmetics businesswoman Tatiana Naumova arranged the Japanese-Russian venture. TV Animation Fullmetal Alchemist Original Soundtrack 1 was released on March 24, 2004, in Japan; the CD has thirty-three tracks, including several background tracks and the first opening and ending theme songs.

The theme song "Brothers" (Russian: Братья, romanized: Braťja; Japanese: ブラザース), sung in Russian, was widely popular. The lyrics were written by Mizushima and translated into Russian by Naumova. "Brothers" became the signature song of the 2003 TV series because it was not used in Fullmetal Alchemist: Brotherhood (2009). An English version of "Brothers" has been recorded by Vic Mignogna—who played Edward Elric in the English dubbed version, though it has never been officially released. TV Animation Fullmetal Alchemist Original Soundtrack 2 was released on December 15, 2004, and contains thirty tracks. TV Animation Fullmetal Alchemist Original Soundtrack 3, released on May 18, 2005, contains twenty-seven tracks.

Fullmetal Alchemist: Complete Best and Fullmetal Alchemist Hagaren Song File (Best Compilation) are compilations of the soundtracks that were released in Japan on October 14, 2004, and December 21, 2005, respectively. A bonus DVD, exclusive to the US release, contains a music video for Nana Kitade's "Indelible Sin". Fullmetal Alchemist the Movie Conqueror of Shamballa OST, which contains forty-six tracks—all of which were used in its parent film—was released on July 20, 2005. During December 2004, a concert titled "Tales of Another Festival" was staged in Tokyo and Osaka. It featured performances by several musical artists from the television series and narrations by the voice actors. A DVD of the concert titled Fullmetal Alchemist Festival—Tales of Another was released in Japan on April 27, 2005.

=== Other ===
Three artbooks titled The Art of Fullmetal Alchemist: The Anime (TVアニメーション鋼の錬金術師 ART BOOK, TV Animēshon Hagane no Renkinjutsushi Artbook) were released in Japan; only the first was released by Viz Media.

A series of five fanbooks titled TV Anime Fullmetal Alchemist Official Fanbooks (TVアニメ 鋼の錬金術師 オフィシャルファンブック, TV Anime Hagane no Renkinjutsushi Ofisharu Fan Bukku), each containing information about the anime and several interviews with the staff of the series.

== Reception ==
=== Audience response ===
The first Fullmetal Alchemist anime premiered in Japan with a 6.8 percent television viewership rating. In 2005, Japanese television network TV Asahi conducted a "Top 100" online web poll and nationwide survey; Fullmetal Alchemist placed first in the online poll and twentieth in the survey. In 2006, TV Asahi conducted another online poll for the top one hundred anime, and Fullmetal Alchemist placed first again.

=== Critical response ===
==== Initial ====
The character designs have been praised; critics said they are different from each other. Samuel Arbogast of THEM Anime Reviews criticised the flashback sequences as annoying. Lori Lancaster of Mania Entertainment called the plot wonderful, and said it is "[a] bit of a tragic coming of age story mixed in with the Odyssey". She wrote, "There is enough action, drama and comedy mixed in to keep most viewers interested. This is one of those anime series that is likely to become a classic."

The series has also received some negative reviews, with Maria Lin of Animefringe saying that the show's themes "are held hostage by… excessive sentimentality". She criticized the ending, saying that "no character has changed from how they were in the beginning. There have been no revelations. Even as the show tries to show that the Elric brothers are coming into their own as they pursue the stone, they're really not, because they keep on making the same mistakes over and over again without… fundamental change in their ideals. The adage of the soldier and his acceptance of losing his leg is lost on them."

Jeremy Crocker of Anime News Network praised the soundtrack for its variety of musical styles and artists, and the pleasant but not too distracting background music. DVDvisionjapan said the first opening theme and the first ending theme were the best tracks of the series.

IGN named it the ninety-fifth-best animated series. They said that although it is mostly upbeat with amazing action scenes, it also touches upon the human condition. They described it as "more than a mere anime" and "a powerful weekly drama". The IGN staff featured it in their "10 Cartoon Adaptations We'd Like to See" feature, with comments focused on the characterization in the series.

==== Later reception ====
The second adaptation, Fullmetal Alchemist: Brotherhood, is generally considered superior to the 2003 anime. In 2019, the anime received comparisons to the final season of Game of Thrones, as both shows came up with an original ending due to overtaking their source material.

In 2015, Rose Bridges of Anime News Network praised the anime's character development, relationships and moral complexity, as well as the humor and political commentary. She concluded, "Fullmetal Alchemist is a dense show on paper, packed with complex characters and intricate subplots, but it never feels that way. At its core, the story is basic and universal. It wears its heart on its sleeve, baring its characters and ideas with powerful sincerity. For that reason, it'll always be one of my favorites. It's an unforgettable story, and that's what made it a classic, hopefully for more generations to come."

In 2022, Paste's Juan Barquin praised it as a better adaptation of the manga than Fullmetal Alchemist: Brotherhood, writing, "Every mildly ridiculous thing FMA does in its 51 episode run (and its sequel film Conqueror of Shamballa) contributes to a larger understanding of these characters, their emotional journey, and the philosophy they find themselves questioning along the way... FMA is at its best when exploring dense material, rather than sidelining it for jokes and action the way Brotherhood does. And it deserves to be seen." Daniel Schindel of Polygon wrote in 2023, "The 2003 Fullmetal Alchemist repeatedly reinforces that life isn't fair, and sometimes there's nothing anyone can do to balance out the bad. It's messier, more idiosyncratic, and less consistent, but executed by skilled artists with a bold vision, which ultimately made it more beautiful and impactful. It's less comforting, but more honest."

Writing for The Encyclopedia of Science Fiction, Piotr Konieczny described Fullmetal Alchemist as one of the defining anime series of its decade. While noting that Fullmetal Alchemist: Brotherhood generally received greater critical acclaim for its tighter long-form narrative and more complete adaptation of the manga, he argued that the earlier adaptation retained a dedicated following for its darker tone, stronger psychological focus, more tragic ending, and more extensive treatment of the manga's early story arcs. Konieczny also regarded the series as an unusual success among anime that significantly diverge from unfinished source material, praising its original storyline as a rare example of an alternate adaptation that stands on its own merits. He concluded that, together with Brotherhood, the two adaptations helped popularize philosophically ambitious, serialized anime by combining action-adventure with explorations of war, technology, loss, and redemption.

=== Awards and accolades ===
Fullmetal Alchemist won in several categories in the American Anime Awards, including "Long Series", "Best Casting", "DVD Package Design", "Best Anime Theme Song" ("Rewrite," by Asian Kung-Fu Generation), and "Best Actor" (Vic Mignogna—who voiced Edward Elric in the English version). It was also nominated in the category of "Best Anime Feature" for Conqueror of Shamballa. The series also won the most awards in the 26th Anime Grand Prix, winning "Best Title", "Favorite Episode" (episode seven), "Best Male Character" (Edward Elric), "Best Female Character" (Riza Hawkeye), "Best Song" ("Melissa", by Porno Graffitti), and "Best Voice Acting" (Romi Park—who voiced Edward in the Japanese version). At the 2006 Tokyo Anime Awards, the series won in the categories "Animation of the Year" (Conqueror of Shambala), "Best Original Story" (Hiromu Arakawa) and "Best Music" (Michiru Ōshima). In the About.com 2006 American Awards, Fullmetal Alchemist won in the categories "Best New Anime Series" and "Best Animation".
