= Magic Disk =

Studio album by Asian Kung-Fu Generation
- Released: June 23, 2010
- Recorded: 2009–2010
- Genre: Indie rock, alternative rock
- Length: 56:19
- Label: Kioon Records

Asian Kung-Fu Generation chronology
Surf Bungaku Kamakura (2008)	Magic Disk (2010)	Best Hit AKG (2012)

Singles from Magic Disk
- 1. "Shinseiki no Love Song" Released: December 2, 2009; 2. "Solanin" Released: March 31, 2010; 3. "Maigoinu to Ame no Beat" Released: May 26, 2010

Magic Disk (マジックディスク, Majikku Disuku) is the sixth studio album by the Japanese rock band Asian Kung-Fu Generation, released on June 23, 2010. It was announced in April 2010 after Gotoh posted an entry into his diary stating the title and that it would be released on June 23, 2010.

== History ==
This is the first album released in 19 months since Surf Bungaku Kamakura. In his own diary, Gotoh was flying to reveal the announcement of the album. But, although the album title and track listing were announced, announcement of the release date was postponed until it was declared by a local DJ on the radio. Before the album was released, a special website was created, also called "Magic Disk". The band also spent some time during February in New York City, recording two songs, "Rising Sun" and "Yes", at Stratosphere Sound. Video of their recordings can be seen on the DVD released with the Limited Edition of Magic Disk.

Some of the music on the album is considerably different from their past albums; such as the inclusion of brass, string, and percussion instruments, along with synthesizers as well. Gotoh has been quoted as saying, "This album is a great personal history, I think it's monumental!"

== Track listing ==
The track listing was announced in Gotoh's diary on 18 April 2010, with Solanin included as an "extra track".

All lyrics are written by Masafumi Gotoh, except "Solanin" by Inio Asano; all music is composed by Masafumi Gotoh, except "Sōshiyō" by Gotoh and Kensuke Kita

No.	Title	Length
1.	"Shinseiki no Love Song" (新世紀のラブソング Love Song of New Century)	5:14
2.	"Magic Disk" (マジックディスク Majikku Disuku)	4:37
3.	"Sōshiyō" (双子葉 Dicotyledon)	3:59
4.	"Sayonara Lost Generation" (さよならロストジェネレイション Goodbye Lost Generation)	5:19
5.	"Maigoinu to Ame no Beat" (迷子犬と雨のビート A Lost Dog and Beats of the Rain)	4:57
6.	"Aozora to Kuroi Neko" (青空と黒い猫 Blue Sky and a Black Cat)	4:39
7.	"Kakū Seibutsu no Blues" (架空生物のブルース Blues of the Imaginary Creature)	4:19
8.	"Last Dance wa Kanashimi o Nosete" (ラストダンスは悲しみを乗せて Last Dance with the Sadness)	3:42
9.	"Microphone" (マイクロフォン Maikurofon)	3:21
10.	"Rising Sun" (ライジングサン Raijingu San)	4:18
11.	"Yes" (イエス Iesu)	3:17
12.	"Daidai" (橙 Bitter Orange)	4:14
13.	"Solanin" (ソラニン Soranin)	4:33
Total length:		56:19

== Personnel ==
- Masafumi Gotō – lead vocals, guitar, lyrics
- Kensuke Kita – lead guitar, background vocals
- Takahiro Yamada – bass, background vocals
- Kiyoshi Ijichi – drums
- Asian Kung-Fu Generation – producer
- Yusuke Nakamura – cover art
