= Sol-fa (album) =

Album by Asian Kung-Fu Generation

Studio album by Asian Kung-Fu Generation
- Released: October 20, 2004 (JP); October 18, 2005 (US)
- Genre: Indie rock, alternative rock, post-hardcore
- Length: 46:39
- Label: Kioon/Tofu
- Producer: Asian Kung-fu Generation

Asian Kung-Fu Generation chronology
Kimi Tsunagi Five M (2003)	Sol-fa (2004)	Fanclub (2006)

Singles from Sol-fa
- 1. "Siren" Released: April 4, 2004; 2. "Loop & Loop" Released: May 19, 2004; 3. "Rewrite" Released: August 4, 2004; 4. "Kimi no Machi Made" Released: September 23, 2004

Sol-fa (ソルファ, Sorufa) is the second studio album by Japanese rock band Asian Kung-Fu Generation, released on October 20, 2004.

== Release ==
Upon its debut, the album topped the Oricon charts for two weeks straight and produced four singles, with sales reaching over 600,000 copies by its third week. Its success can be partially traced to two tracks that the band produced, "Rewrite" and "Haruka Kanata," were featured in the opening themes of the highly popular anime series Fullmetal Alchemist and Naruto respectively. In 2016, the 2016 version of "Re:Re:" was used as the opening for the anime adaptation of Erased. With the LP, AKG also finally succeeded in outreaching to international audiences, a goal they had attempted in earlier English indie releases but were met by little response.

The album peaked at number three on the World Chart while "Rewrite" went on to win Best Anime Theme Song at the 2007 American Anime Awards. Following its domestic release, fans from around the world petitioned for Sol-fa to be distributed outside Japan. The support for Ajikan eventually resulted in Tofu Records striking a contract to release Sol-fa in the United States on October 18, 2005.

== Reception ==
With the LP, AKG fully realized and honed the upbeat tempo but hard-edged and emotionally charged sound first expressed within Hōkai Amplifier. The urgency of the songs were complemented by the balanced nature of the overall album, creating their most mature release as of late. Gotō credited this outcome as the result of sharing his songwriting duties more evenly with bandmates than ever before. The album was equally praised for its high production quality, which thoroughly nullified the language barrier that frequently impeded non–Japanese speaking audiences. In 2020, Jonathan McNamara of The Japan Times listed Sol-fa as one of the 10 Japanese albums worthy of inclusion on Rolling Stone's 2020 list of the 500 greatest albums of all time, billing it as "an album full of tracks as well produced as they are sonically complex."

== Track listing ==
All lyrics are written by Masafumi Gotoh; all music is composed by Masafumi Gotoh, except "Siren" and "Re:Re:" by Gotoh and Takahiro Yamada

No.	Title	Length
1.	"Shindōkaku" (振動覚 Resonance)	2:27
2.	"Rewrite" (リライト Riraito)	3:47
3.	"Kimi no Machi Made" (君の街まで To Your Town)	3:36
4.	"My World" (マイ・ワールド Mai Wārudo)	4:03
5.	"Yoru no Mukō" (夜の向こう The Next Night)	3:12
6.	"Last Scene" (ラストシーン Rasutoshīn)	4:01
7.	"Siren" (サイレン Sairen)	5:28
8.	"Re:Re:"	3:48
9.	"Nijūyoji" (24時 Midnight)	3:31
10.	"Mayonaka to Mahiru no Yume" (真夜中と真昼の夢 Midnight and Daydreams)	4:21
11.	"Kaigan Dōri" (海岸通り Waterfront)	4:40
12.	"Loop & Loop" (ループ&ループ Rūpu & Rūpu)	3:45
Total length:		46:39

Bonus DVD
No.	Title	Length
13.	"Haruka Kanata (Live)"	4:02
14.	"Shindo-Kaku (Live)"	2:27

=== B-sides ===
Song	Length	B-side of
"Siren#"	6:15	"Siren"
"Entrance" (Live)	4:12	"Loop & Loop"
"Rashinban" (Live)	2:37	"Loop & Loop"
"Yūgure no Aka"	4:17	"Rewrite"
"Hold Me Tight"	4:06	"Kimi no Machi Made"

== Sol-fa 2016 ==
Sol-fa 2016

Studio album by Asian Kung-Fu Generation
- Released: November 30, 2016
- Genre: Indie rock, alternative rock
- Length: 49:32
- Label: Kioon
- Producer: Asian Kung-fu Generation

Asian Kung-Fu Generation chronology
Wonder Future (2015)	Sol-fa 2016 (2016)	Hometown (2018)

Singles from Sol-fa 2016
- 1. "Re:Re:" Released: March 16, 2016

In 2016, Asian Kung-fu Generation re-recorded Sol-fa and released it on November 30, 2016. "Re:Re:" was released as the lead single on March 16, 2016. The tracklist changed with "Loop & Loop" as the third track and made "Kaigan Dōri" the closer for the album. This was the original track order that the band wanted for the original album, but they decided not to as they thought it would be bad to have all the singles in the first half of the album.

=== Track listing ===
No.	Title	Length
1.	"Shindōkaku" (振動覚 Resonance)	2:27
2.	"Rewrite" (リライト Riraito)	4:39
3.	"Loop & Loop" (ループ&ループ Rūpu & Rūpu)	3:37
4.	"Kimi no Machi Made" (君の街まで To Your Town)	3:40
5.	"My World" (マイ・ワールド Mai Wārudo)	4:03
6.	"Yoru no Mukō" (夜の向こう The Next Night)	3:13
7.	"Last Scene" (ラストシーン Rasutoshīn)	3:55
8.	"Siren" (サイレン Sairen)	5:25
9.	"Re:Re:"	5:26
10.	"Nijūyoji" (24時 Midnight)	3:34
11.	"Mayonaka to Mahiru no Yume" (真夜中と真昼の夢 Midnight and Daydreams)	4:26
12.	"Kaigan Dōri" (海岸通り Waterfront)	5:01
Total length:		49:32

== Personnel ==
- Masafumi Gotoh – lead vocals, guitar
- Kensuke Kita – lead guitar, background vocals
- Takahiro Yamada – bass, background vocals
- Kiyoshi Ijichi – drums
- Asian Kung-Fu Generation – producer
- Michihiko Nakayama – executive producer
- Rieko Ohkura – production coordination
- Fumihito Yokono – drum technician
- Kenichi Nakamura – engineering
- Toru Takayama – engineering, mixing
- Stephen Marcussen – mastering
- Stewart Whitmore – editing
- Yusuke Nakamura – art direction

== Chart positions ==
=== Sol-fa ===
==== Album ====
Year	Chart	Peak positions
2004	Oricon	1
2004	World Chart	3

==== Singles ====
Year	Song	Peak positions
Year	Song	Oricon
2004	"Siren"	2
2004	"Loop & Loop"	8
2004	"Rewrite"	4
2004	"Kimi no Machi Made"	3

=== Sol-fa 2016 ===
==== Album ====
Year	Chart	Peak positions
2016	Oricon	4
2016	Japan Hot Album	3

==== Singles ====
Year	Song	Peak positions
Year	Song	Oricon
2016	"Re:Re:"	9
