= World Apart =

Single by Asian Kung-Fu Generation

from the album Fanclub
- Released: February 15, 2006
- Studio: Crescent Studio; Folio Sound; Landmark Studio
- Genre: Alternative rock, Power pop
- Length: 4:29
- Label: Ki/oon Records; KSCL-934
- Songwriter: Masafumi Gotoh
- Producer: Asian Kung-Fu Generation

Asian Kung-Fu Generation singles chronology
| "Blue Train" (2005) | "World Apart" (2006) | "Aru Machi no Gunjō" (2006) |

"World Apart" (ワールドアパート, Wārudo Apāto) is a song by Japanese rock band Asian Kung-Fu Generation. It was released as the second single of their third studio album, Fanclub, on February 15, 2006. The song is unique for a number of reasons. Not only was it the first single AKG released following their tenth anniversary, it also became their first number-one single, debuting at the top of the Oricon charts. The song's b-side, "Uso to Wonderland," was also the first recording in which Kensuke Kita held the position of lead singer.

== Music video ==
The music video for "World Apart" was directed by Nobuyuki Matsukawa, with planning by Atsushi Masachika and Satoshi Iwashita.

== Track listing ==
All lyrics are written by Masafumi Gotoh.

| No. | Title | Music | Length |
|---|---|---|---|
| 1. | "World Apart" (ワールドアパート Wārudo Apāto) | Masafumi Gotoh | 4:29 |
| 2. | "Eien ni" (永遠に Forever) | Masafumi Gotoh | 3:12 |
| 3. | "Uso to Wonderland" (嘘とワンダーランド Lies and Wonderland) | Kensuke Kita | 2:28 |
| Total length: | | | 10:09 |

== Personnel ==
- Masafumi Gotō – lead vocals, rhythm guitar
- Kensuke Kita – lead guitar, background vocals
- Takahiro Yamada – bass, background vocals
- Kiyoshi Ijichi – drums
- Asian Kung-Fu Generation – producer
- Yusuke Nakamura – single cover art

== Charts ==
| Year | Chart | Peak position |
|---|---|---|
| 2006 | Oricon | 1 |
