= Rewrite (song) =

Single by Asian Kung-Fu Generation

from the album Sol-fa
- Released: August 4, 2004
- Studio: Aobadai Studio; Folio Sound; Landmark Studio
- Genre: Alternative rock
- Length: 3:47
- Label: Ki/oon; KSCL-925
- Songwriter: Masafumi Gotoh
- Producer: Asian Kung-Fu Generation

Asian Kung-Fu Generation singles chronology
"Loop & Loop" (2004)	"Rewrite" (2004)	"Kimi no Machi Made" (2004)

Music video
- "Rewrite" on YouTube

"Rewrite" (リライト, Riraito) is a song by Japanese rock band Asian Kung-Fu Generation. It was released as the third single of their second full-length studio album, Sol-fa, on August 4, 2004. In 2016, they re-recorded "Rewrite" along with all songs from Sol-fa and released on November 30, 2016.

== Reception ==
The song experienced immense domestic and international popularity after it was chosen as the fourth and final opening theme of the first Fullmetal Alchemist anime series. Peaking at number four on the Oricon charts, the single sold nearly 150,000 units by the end of the year it was released, making it the 63rd single of the year. It later went on to win Best Anime Theme Song at the 2007 American Anime Awards.

The song is listed on the appendix of Robert Dimery's book 1001 Songs You Must Hear Before You Die (And 10001 You Must Download).

== Music video ==
The music video for "Rewrite" was directed by Kazuyoshi Oku. The video primarily features the band playing in front of enormous speakers. During the song's breakdown, they temporarily levitate in the air. In 2016, they released new music video of Rewrite to promote Sol-fa 2016. The video primarily features the band playing in front of fans and speakers. During the song's breakdown, they drowned in a sea.

== Track listing ==
All tracks are written by Masafumi Gotoh.

No.	Title	Length
1.	"Rewrite" (リライト Riraito)	3:47
2.	"Yūgure no Aka" (夕暮れの紅 Crimson Dusk)	4:16
Total length:		8:03

== Personnel ==
- Masafumi Gotoh – lead vocals, rhythm guitar
- Kensuke Kita – lead guitar, background vocals
- Takahiro Yamada – bass, background vocals
- Kiyoshi Ijichi – drums
- Asian Kung-Fu Generation – producer
- Tohru Takayama – mixing, recording
- Mitsuharu Harada – mastering
- Kenichi Nakamura – recording
- Yusuke Nakamura – single cover art

== Charts ==
Year	Chart	Peak position
2004	Japanese Singles (Oricon)	4
2016	Japan Hot 100 (Billboard)	49

== Awards and nominations ==
=== American Anime Awards ===
Year	Nominee / work	Award	Result
2007	"Rewrite" (from anime Fullmetal Alchemist)	Best Anime Theme Song	Won

=== Music Awards Japan ===
Year	Nominee / work	Award	Result
2025	"Rewrite"	Best Revival Hit Song	Nominated

== Certifications ==
Region	Certification	Certified units/sales
Japan (RIAJ) CD	Gold	100,000^{^}
Japan (RIAJ) Digital	Platinum	250,000^{*}
Japan (RIAJ) Streaming	Platinum	100,000,000^{†}
^{*} Sales figures based on certification alone.^{^} Shipments figures based on certification alone.^{†} Streaming-only figures based on certification alone.

== Cover versions and media usage ==
- American rock band, Darling Thieves, covered this song with English lyrics in 2012.
- The song was used for the karaoke scene in 2019 Japanese film, Startup Girls.
- Japanese voice actor and singer, Shugo Nakamura, covered this song for cover song project CrosSing and released it in 2022.
- Japanese singer, Nano, covered this song with English lyrics on her 2023 album, NOIXE.
- Japanese hip hop duo Creepy Nuts, covered this song for the AKG Tribute album in 2017.
- The song was used in a promotional video for the 2024 edition of the M-1 Grand Prix competition.
