= Mirai no Kakera =

Single by Asian Kung-Fu Generation

from the album Kimi Tsunagi Five M
- Released: August 6, 2003
- Genre: Indie rock, power pop
- Length: 4:45
- Label: Ki/oon Records; KSCL-905
- Songwriter(s): Masafumi Gotoh
- Producer(s): Asian Kung-Fu Generation

Asian Kung-Fu Generation singles chronology
"Mirai no Kakera" (2003)	"Kimi to Iu Hana" (2003)

"Mirai no Kakera" (未来の破片, Piece of the Future) is a song by Japanese rock band Asian Kung-Fu Generation. It was released as the first single of their major-label debut album, Kimi Tsunagi Five M, on August 6, 2003. The song's b-side, "Entrance," was later included on the band's 2006 compilation, Feedback File.

== Music video ==
The music video for "Mirai no Kakera" was directed by Suguru Takeuchi. The PV features the band performing the song in a pitch-black environment. As they play, a mysterious woman wearing a hideously cartoonish, cardboard mask resembling Gotoh's face dances to the song.

== Track listing ==
All tracks are written by Masafumi Gotoh

No.	Title	Length
1.	"Mirai no Kakera" (未来の破片 Piece of the Future)	4:45
2.	"Entrance" (エントランス Entoransu)	3:58
3.	"Sono Wake o" (その訳を The Reason Why)	4:35
Total length:		12:38

== Personnel ==
- Masafumi Gotoh – lead vocals, rhythm guitar
- Kensuke Kita – lead guitar, background vocals
- Takahiro Yamada – bass, background vocals
- Kiyoshi Ijichi – drums
- Asian Kung-Fu Generation – producer
- Yusuke Nakamura – single cover art

== Charts ==
Year	Chart	Peak position
2003	Oricon	34
