= Kimi to Iu Hana =

Single by Asian Kung-Fu Generation

from the album Kimi Tsunagi Five M
- Released: October 16, 2003
- Genre: Indie rock, Post-punk revival
- Length: 6:10
- Label: Ki/oon Records; KSCL-907
- Songwriter(s): Masafumi Gotoh
- Producer(s): Asian Kung-Fu Generation

Asian Kung-Fu Generation singles chronology
"Mirai no Kakera" (2003)	"Kimi to Iu Hana" (2003)	"Siren" (2004)

"Kimi to Iu Hana" (君という花, 'A Flower Named You') is a song by Japanese rock band Asian Kung-Fu Generation. It was released as the second single of their major-label debut album, Kimi Tsunagi Five M, on October 16, 2003. The song's b-side, "Rocket No.4," was later included on the band's 2006 anniversary compilation, Feedback File. "Kimi to Iu Hana" was ranked at 3rd on fans request for band's 10th anniversary live setlist on September 14, 2013.

== Music video ==
The music video for "Kimi to Iu Hana" was directed by Toshiaki Toyoda. A majority of the PV was filmed near a lake and an apartment complex. The video begins with a small man dressed in an elf costume dancing to the song while walking across a pier. AKG is then shown performing between the apartments and the lake. This is intercut with various scenes which depict the band running, angling, and finally joining the man in dancing across the pier. The video ends with an image of a flower dangling on a fishing hook. In 2004, the video won the award for Best New Artist Video at the SPACE SHOWER Music Video Awards.

== Track listing ==
All tracks are written by Masafumi Gotoh

No.	Title	Length
1.	"Kimi to Iu Hana" (君という花 A Flower Named You)	6:10
2.	"Rocket No.4" (ロケットNo.4 Roketto No.4)	3:42
Total length:		9:52

== Cover versions ==
- Marié Digby - Second Home (2009)
- KANA-BOON - AKG TRIBUTE (2017)

== Personnel ==
- Masafumi Gotō – lead vocals
- Kensuke Kita – lead guitar, background vocals
- Takahiro Yamada – bass, background vocals
- Kiyoshi Ijichi – drums
- Asian Kung-Fu Generation – producer
- Yusuke Nakamura – single cover art

== Charts ==
Year	Chart	Peak position
2003	Oricon	14
