= After Dark (Asian Kung-Fu Generation song) =

2007 single by the Japanese band Asian Kung-Fu Generation

Single by Asian Kung-Fu Generation

from the album World World World
- Released: November 7, 2007
- Genre: Indie rock
- Length: 3:12
- Label: Ki/oon Records; KSCL-1176
- Songwriters: Masafumi Gotoh (Lyrics) Masafumi Gotoh; Takahiro Yamada (Music)
- Producer: Asian Kung-Fu Generation

Asian Kung-Fu Generation singles chronology
"Aru Machi no Gunjō" (2006)	"After Dark" (2007)	"Korogaru Iwa, Kimi ni Asa ga Furu" (2008)

Music video
- "After Dark" on YouTube

"After Dark" (アフターダーク, Afutā Dāku) is a song by Japanese Indie rock band Asian Kung-Fu Generation. It was released as the second single of their fifth studio album, World World World, on November 7, 2007, nearly a whole year after the release of the album's lead single. The single debuted in the top ten on the Oricon charts and was selected to be used as the seventh opening theme of the anime series Bleach.

== Music video ==
The music video for "After Dark" was directed by Tadashi Tsukagoshi. The narrative video tells the surrealistic story of an ordinary young salaryman who wakes up one day to find wings sprouting out his back. At first, the man tries to hide them and continue going about his everyday life. However, as time goes on, the wings gradually grow larger and become increasingly harder to hide from his friends and co-workers. All the while, the scenes are intercut with a visual of AKG, expressing similar wings, playing the song in a giant birdcage.

While walking home one day, the man bears witness of a helpless window cleaner about to fall from a high-story building. The young man wishes to act, but hesitates due to the large crowd that has gathered around the scene. But when the cleaner begins to lose his grip, the young man throws off all hesitation, makes a dash towards him, spreads his wings, and soars to the rescue. At the same moment, the giant birdcage that had been holding AKG shatters to pieces. The video went on to win Best Rock Video at SPACE SHOWER Music Video Awards 08.

== Track listing ==
All lyrics are written by Masafumi Gotoh.

No.	Title	Music	Length
1.	"After Dark" (アフターダーク Afutā Dāku)	Masafumi Gotoh, Takahiro Yamada	3:12
2.	"Yuigahama Kite" (由比ヶ浜カイト Yuigahama Kaito)	Masafumi Gotoh	3:54
Total length:			9:25

== Personnel ==
- Masafumi Gotō – lead vocals, rhythm guitar
- Kensuke Kita – lead guitar, background vocals
- Takahiro Yamada – bass, background vocals
- Kiyoshi Ijichi – drums
- Asian Kung-Fu Generation – producer
- Yusuke Nakamura – single cover art

== Charts ==
Year	Chart	Peak position
2007	Oricon	5
