= Kimi Tsunagi Five M =

Studio album by Asian Kung-Fu Generation
- Released: November 19, 2003
- Recorded: 2003
- Genres: Pop punk, alternative rock, indie rock
- Length: 50:06
- Labels: Kioon Music; KSCL-629

Asian Kung-Fu Generation chronology
Hōkai Amplifier (2002)	Kimi Tsunagi Five M (2003)	Sol-fa (2004)

Singles from Kimi Tsunagi Five M
- 1. "Mirai no Kakera" Released: August 6, 2003; 2. "Kimi to Iu Hana" Released: October 16, 2003

Kimi Tsunagi Five M (君繋ファイブエム, Kimi tsunagi faibu emu) is the first studio album by Japanese rock band Asian Kung-Fu Generation and their second major-label release overall, released on November 19, 2003 on Kioon Music. The album's name is sometimes given as "Kunkei Five M," but the reading "Kimitsunagi" is given in katakana on the original compact disc. Peaking at number five on the Oricon charts, the LP retained two successful singles, "Mirai no Kakera" and "Kimi to Iu Hana, and has gone on to sell over 250,000 copies. The album is also featured in a live studio recording which is included as a bonus DVD from the limited edition of future compilation, Best Hit AKG.

== Track listing ==
All lyrics are written by Masafumi Gotoh; all music is composed by Masafumi Gotoh, except "No Name" by Gotoh and Takahiro Yamada.

No.	Title	Length
1.	"Flashback" (フラッシュバック Furasshubakku)	1:58
2.	"Mirai no Kakera" (未来の破片 Piece of The Future)	4:45
3.	"Denpatou" (電波塔 Radio Tower)	3:31
4.	"Understand" (アンダースタンド Andāsutando)	3:44
5.	"Natsu no Hi, Zanzō" (夏の日、残像 After Image of Summer)	4:41
6.	"Mugen Glider" (無限グライダー Eternal Glider)	5:07
7.	"Sono Wake o" (その訳を The Reason Why)	4:36
8.	"N.G.S"	2:54
9.	"Jihei Tansaku" (自閉探索 (Search Within) Social Withdrawal)	3:28
10.	"E"	4:12
11.	"Kimi to Iu Hana" (君という花 A Flower Named You)	6:10
12.	"No Name" (ノーネーム Nōnēmu)	5:00
Total length:		50:06

2009 Korean reissue Bonus Track
No.	Title	Length
13.	"Yoru no Call" (夜のコール Call of the Night)	3:55

=== B-sides ===
Song	Length	B-side of
"Entrance"	3:59	"Mirai no Kakera"
"Sono Wake o"	4:36	"Mirai no Kakera"
"Rocket No. 4"	3:42	"Kimi to Iu Hana"

== Personnel ==
- Masafumi Gotō – lead vocals, guitar, lyrics
- Kensuke Kita – lead guitar, background vocals
- Takahiro Yamada – bass, background vocals
- Kiyoshi Ijichi – drums
- Asian Kung-Fu Generation – producer
- Tohru Takayama – mixing
- Mitsuharu Harada – mastering
- Kenichi Nakamura – recording
- Yusuke Nakamura – art direction

== Chart positions ==
=== Album ===
Year	Chart	Peak positions
2003	Oricon	5

=== Singles ===
Year	Song	Peak positions
Year	Song	Oricon
2003	"Mirai no Kakera"	34
2003	"Kimi to Iu Hana"	14
