= Siren (Asian Kung-Fu Generation song) =

Single by Asian Kung-Fu Generation

from the album Sol-fa
- Released: April 4, 2004
- Studio: Folio Sound; Landmark Studio
- Genre: Indie rock
- Length: 5:28
- Label: Ki/oon; KSCL-917
- Songwriters: Masafumi Gotoh (Lyrics) Masafumi Gotoh; Takahiro Yamada (Music)
- Producer: Asian Kung-Fu Generation

Asian Kung-Fu Generation singles chronology
"Kimi to Iu Hana" (2003)	"Siren" (2004)	"Loop & Loop" (2004)

Back cover

"Siren" (サイレン, Sairen) is a song by Japanese rock band Asian Kung-Fu Generation. It was released as the lead single of their second full-length studio album, Sol-fa, on April 4, 2004. With the band's then-newly emerging popularity, the single managed to debut at number two on the Oricon charts. Although the song's B-side, "Siren#," shares a nearly identical title with the single, the two are somewhat different from each other. While both retain the same instrumental, the lyrics and melody of "Siren#" are different from that of "Siren." In a sense, "Siren#" can be considered a continuation or a remix of its A-side.

== Music video ==
The music video for "Siren" and "Siren#" were directed by Toshiaki Toyoda. The video presents a sweeping tour past a suspension bridge and through a city by translucent astral projections of the band. As the end of the song, Masafumi Gotoh walks toward the camera, puts his hand in front of it and then slowly disappears. For "Siren#", the video presented in the same way as Siren, but with different scenes. The Siren# video ends with Gotoh followed by other members exiting from the set.

== Track listing ==
All lyrics are written by Masafumi Gotoh; all music is composed by Masafumi Gotoh and Takahiro Yamada.

No.	Title	Length
1.	"Siren" (サイレン Sairen)	5:28
2.	"Siren#" (サイレン# Sairen#)	6:13
Total length:		11:41

== Personnel ==
- Masafumi Gotoh – lead vocals, rhythm guitar
- Kensuke Kita – lead guitar, background vocals
- Takahiro Yamada – bass, background vocals
- Kiyoshi Ijichi – drums
- Asian Kung-Fu Generation – producer
- Tohru Takayama – mixing
- Mitsuharu Harada – mastering
- Kenichi Nakamura – recording
- Yusuke Nakamura – single cover art

== Charts ==
Year	Chart	Peak position
2004	Oricon	2
