= American Anime Awards =

2007 American award

The American Anime Awards were a series of awards designed to recognize excellence in the release of anime and manga in North America.

The first (and only) annual American Anime Awards balloting was supervised by Milton Griepp of industry website ICv2. The first gala awards presentation was hosted in New York City on February 24, 2007, at New York Comic Con. The hosts of the evening were eight actresses from the anime production company ADV Films: Christine Auten, Shelley Calene-Black, Jessica Boone, Luci Christian, Alice Fulks, Hilary Haag, Taylor Hannah and Serena Varghese. A streaming version of the one-hour awards ceremony can be seen on IGN.com. The awards were later broadcast on the Anime Network.

== Voting information ==
The ballots contained nominations from industry companies and professionals. To be eligible for an award, anime or manga must be available in the U.S. during the previous year, prior to the awards gala. Whether by DVD (or book or periodical, in the case of manga), national TV, or theatrical release. Anime and manga are defined, as animation or comics, respectively, originally produced in Japan.

Voting was conducted via an online ballot system. The American Anime Awards partnered with respected industry news site ICv2 to host and track the fan voting to ensure accurate voting and to eliminate any mass voting by single individuals. Nevertheless, the impartiality of the poll was questioned as certain companies (ADV Films) were "overwhelminvly involved" in the event.

== Winners and nominees ==
Winners are listed first and denoted in bold.

**Best Anime Feature**: **Final Fantasy VII Advent Children — Square Enix Holdings**; Akira — Toho; Fullmetal Alchemist: Conqueror of Shamballa — Bones; InuYasha Movie 4: Fire on Mystic Island — Sunrise; Pokémon: Lucario and the Mystery of Mew — OLM	**Best Comedy Anime**: **FLCL — Gainax, Production I.G, and King Records**; Ah! My Goddess — Anime International Company; Kodocha — J.C. Staff; Ranma ½ — Studio Deen; Tenchi Muyo Ryo-Ohki — Anime International Company
**Best Long Series**: **Fullmetal Alchemist — Bones**; InuYasha — Sunrise; Naruto — Studio Pierrot; Rurouni Kenshin — Gallop and Studio Deen; Samurai Champloo — Manglobe	**Best Short Series**: **FLCL — Gainax, Production I.G, and King Records**; Elfen Lied — Arms; Gravitation TV — Studio Deen; Hellsing Ultimate — Gonzo; Ranma ½ OAV — Studio Deen
**Best Manga**: **Fruits Basket — by Natsuki Takaya**; Bleach by Tite Kubo; Death Note by Tsugumi Ohba; Neon Genesis Evangelion by Gainax and Hideaki Anno; Naruto by Masashi Kishimoto	**Best Actor**: **Vic Mignogna (Fullmetal Alchemist, Macross)**; Johnny Yong Bosch (Akira, Bleach, Eureka Seven); Crispin Freeman (Hellsing Ultimate, Noein, Revolutionary Girl Utena); Richard Hayworth (Rurouni Kenshin); Yuri Lowenthal (Naruto)
**Best Actress**: **Mary Elizabeth McGlynn (Ghost in the Shell: Stand Alone Complex 2nd GIG)**; Luci Christian (Princess Tutu); Susan Dalian (Naruto); Maile Flanagan (Naruto); Michelle Ruff (Bleach, Lupin the Third)	**Best Actor in a Comedy**: **Dave Wittenberg (Zatch Bell!)**; Greg Ayres (Negima, Nerima Daikon Brothers); Johnny Yong Bosch (Akira); Liam O'Brien (Comic Party, DNA Squared, Girls Bravo); Tony Oliver (Lupin the Third)
**Best Actress in a Comedy**: **Debi Derryberry (Zatch Bell!)**; Laura Bailey (Kodocha); Luci Christian (Desert Punk, Negima, Nerima Daikon Brothers); Hilary Haag (Paniponi Dash); Michelle Ruff (Lupin the Third)	**Best Casting**: **Fullmetal Alchemist — Bones**; FLCL — Gainax, Production I.G, and King Records; Ghost in the Shell: Stand Alone Complex 2nd GIG — Production I.G; Inuyasha — Sunrise; Naruto — Studio Pierrot
**DVD Package Design**: **Fullmetal Alchemist — Bones**; Bleach Volume 1 — Studio Pierrot; Final Fantasy VII Advent Children — Square Enix Holdings; Hellsing Ultimate Volume 1: Limited Edition — Gonzo; Naruto Uncut Box Set 1 — Studio Pierrot	**Best Anime Theme Song**: **"Rewrite" by Asian Kung-Fu Generation — Fullmetal Alchemist**; "*: Asterisk" by Orange Range — Bleach; "Heart of Sword--Yoake Mae" by T.M. Revolution — Rurouni Kenshin; "Ride on Shooting Star" by the Pillows — FLCL; "Rise" by Origa — Ghost in the Shell: Stand Alone Complex 2nd GIG
**Special Award for Outstanding Achievement**: **Peter Fernandez**

== Statistics ==
Anime with multiple nominations (Note: Includes nominations for multiple seasons as well as related films, if any.)
Nominations	Anime
7	Naruto
5	Bleach
5	Fullmetal Alchemist
4	FLCL
3	Akira
3	Ghost in the Shell: Stand Alone Complex 2nd GIG
3	Hellsing Ultimate
3	InuYasha
3	Lupin the Third
3	Rurouni Kenshin
2	Final Fantasy VII Advent Children
2	Ranma ½
2	Zatch Bell!

Anime with multiple wins
Wins	Anime
5	Fullmetal Alchemist
2	FLCL
2	Zatch Bell!

== Criticism ==
The nominating and voting process has received criticism from fans for lack of clarity and being too inclusive: for example, while some acting nominees are specifically cited for one or more series, others are cited for none at all, leaving it to the voter to decide if they should consider the series specifically mentioned, or the actor's entire body of work. Also, since evidently any anime that was released in any way in 2006 is eligible for nomination, some actors have been nominated for work done years or even decades ago. Another criticism was the apparent error of including Johnny Yong Bosch as Best Actor in a Comedy despite the fact Akira is not a comedy.

== Coverage ==
The news of the awards were announced on major websites on affiliated websites like ICv2, but was also reported and followed like IGN.

== See also ==
- List of animation awards
- List of manga awards
