= Kimi no Machi Made =

Single by Asian Kung-Fu Generation

from the album Sol-fa
- Released: September 23, 2004
- Studio: Aobadai Studio; Folio Sound; Landmark Studio
- Genre: Alternative rock
- Length: 3:36
- Label: Ki/oon; KSCL-927
- Songwriter: Masafumi Gotoh
- Producer: Asian Kung-Fu Generation

Asian Kung-Fu Generation singles chronology
"Rewrite" (2004)	"Kimi no Machi Made" (2004)	"Blue Train" (2005)

"Kimi no Machi Made" (君の街まで, To Your Town) is a song by Japanese rock band Asian Kung-Fu Generation. It was released as the fourth and final single of their second full-length studio album, Sol-fa, on September 23, 2004.

== Music video ==
The music video for "Kimi no Machi Made" was directed by Daisuke Shibata. The PV revolves around a synchronised swimming duo at a competition performing their routine to the rhythm of the song. Despite the great amount of pressure on their shoulders as well as the interference of a giant crayfish, the two are able to successfully execute their routine. The video was nominated for Best Rock Video and Best Group Video at 2005 MTV Video Music Awards Japan. The video won the award for Best Concept Video at the 2005 SPACE SHOWER Music Video Awards.

== Track listing ==
All tracks are written by Masafumi Gotoh.

No.	Title	Length
1.	"Kimi no Machi Made" (君の街まで To Your Town)	3:36
2.	"Hold Me Tight"	4:04
Total length:		8:40

== Personnel ==
- Masafumi Gotō – lead vocals, rhythm guitar
- Kensuke Kita – lead guitar, background vocals
- Takahiro Yamada – bass, background vocals
- Kiyoshi Ijichi – drums
- Asian Kung-Fu Generation – producer
- Tohru Takayama – mixing, recording
- Mitsuharu Harada – mastering
- Kenichi Nakamura – recording
- Kenichi Yamura – recording
- Yusuke Nakamura – single cover art

== Charts ==
Year	Chart	Peak position
2004	Oricon	3
