= Aru Machi no Gunjō =

Single by Asian Kung-Fu Generation

from the album World World World
- Released: November 29, 2006
- Studio: On Air Azabu Studio
- Genre: Alternative rock
- Length: 4:16
- Label: Ki/oon Records; KSCL-1068
- Songwriter: Masafumi Gotoh
- Producer: Asian Kung-Fu Generation

Asian Kung-Fu Generation singles chronology
"World Apart" (2006)	"Aru Machi no Gunjō" (2006)	"After Dark" (2007)

Music video
- "Aru Machi no Gunjō" on YouTube

"Aru Machi no Gunjō" (或る街の群青, A Town In Blue) is a song by Japanese rock band Asian Kung-Fu Generation. It was released as the lead single of their fifth studio album, World World World, on November 29, 2006. The song was conceived on tour when the director of the then-upcoming anime film, Tekkonkinkreet, approached the band and requested a theme song for his film. AKFG proceeded to compose the track and released it as a single a month prior to the film's December 23 debut. The single peaked at number four on the Oricon charts and sold over 50,000 copies in 2006 alone, becoming the 199th single of the year. The song was ranked 5th on fans request for band's 10th anniversary live setlist on September 14, 2013.

== Music video ==
The music video for "Aru Machi no Gunjō" was directed by Hideaki Sunaga. Beginning with a sunrise, the PV alternates from an outer view of a city, the band playing the song in a garage, a raven inside a birdcage, and a fishtank holding a jellyfish before finally concluding with a sunset. The video was nominated for Best Rock Video at MTV Video Music Awards Japan 2007.

== Track listing ==
All tracks are written by Masafumi Gotoh.

No.	Title	Length
1.	"Aru Machi no Gunjō" (或る街の群青 A Town In Blue)	4:16
2.	"Kugenuma Surf" (鵠沼サーフ Kugenuma Sāfu)	2:28
Total length:		6:44

== Personnel ==
- Masafumi Gotō – lead vocals, rhythm guitar
- Kensuke Kita – lead guitar, background vocals
- Takahiro Yamada – bass, background vocals
- Kiyoshi Ijichi – drums
- Asian Kung-Fu Generation – producer
- Yusuke Nakamura – single cover art

== Charts ==
Year	Chart	Peak position
2006	Oricon	4

== Certifications ==
Certifications for "Aru Machi no Gunjō"
Region	Certification	Certified units/sales
Japan (RIAJ)	Gold	100,000^{*}
^{*} Sales figures based on certification alone.
