= Asian Kung-Fu Generation =

Japanese alternative rock band

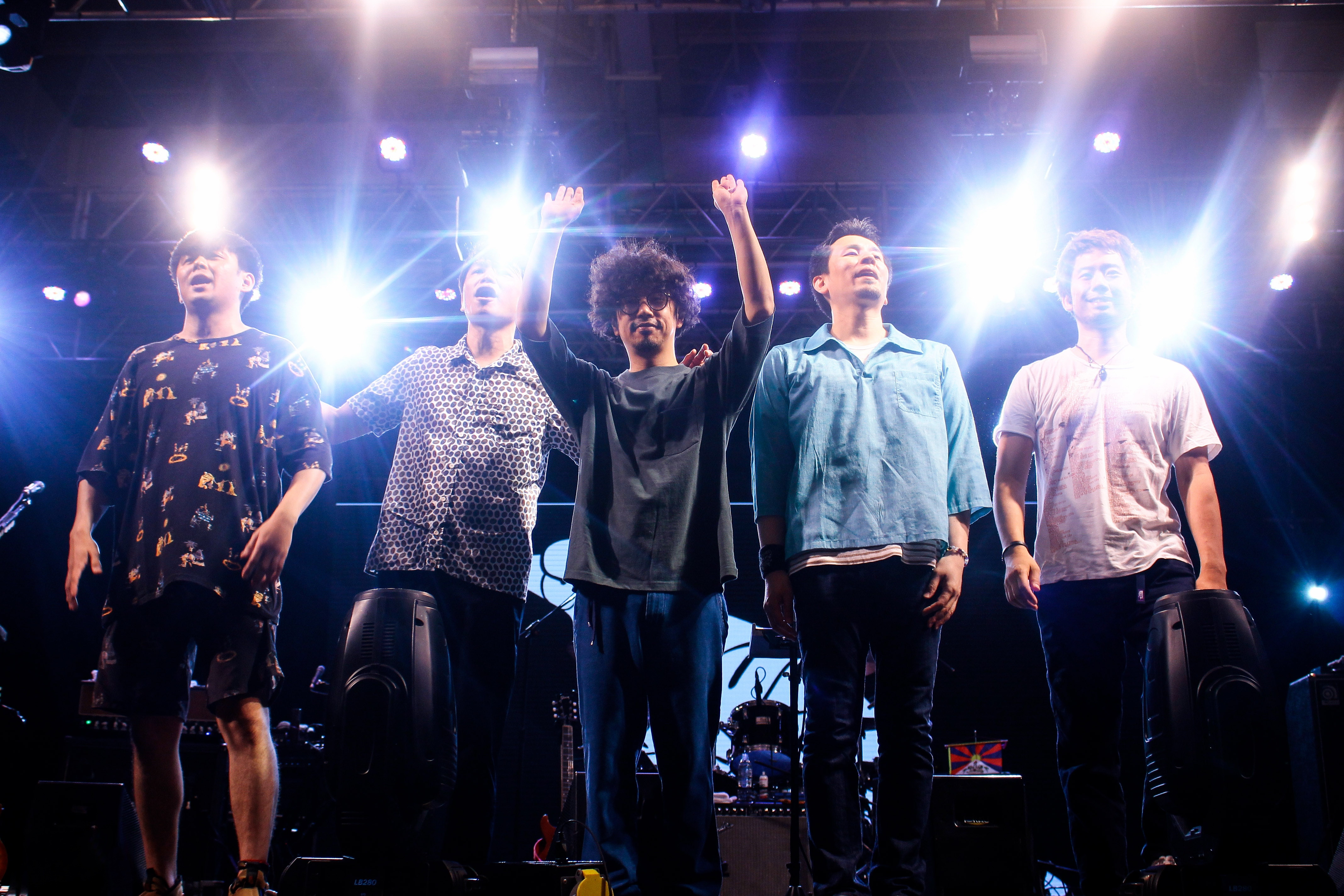
- Asian Kung-Fu Generation on stage in 2017. From left to right: Ryōsuke Shimomura, Kensuke Kita, Masafumi Gotoh, Takahiro Yamada, Kiyoshi Ijichi

Background information
- Also known as: Ajikan; AKG; AKFG
- Origin: Yokohama, Japan
- Genres: Indie rock; alternative rock; power pop; pop punk (early)
- Years active: 1996–present
- Labels: Kioon; Tofu; Okami; JPU
- Members: Masafumi Gotoh; Kensuke Kita; Takahiro Yamada; Kiyoshi Ijichi
- Website: www.asiankung-fu.com

Asian Kung-Fu Generation (Note: Japanese: アジアン・カンフー・ジェネレーション, Hepburn: Ajian Kanfū Jenerēshon) (stylized in all caps) is a Japanese alternative rock band formed in Yokohama in 1996. For its entire career, the band has consisted of vocalist Masafumi Gotoh, guitarist Kensuke Kita, bassist Takahiro Yamada, and drummer Kiyoshi Ijichi. Starting out as a college band, Asian Kung-Fu Generation released a series of independent EPs featuring lyrics mostly sung in English. In 2002, they released their major-label EP debut Hōkai Amplifier, from that point singing their lyrics in Japanese. The band's musical style is influenced by seminal Western alternative rock acts as well as their own local Japanese indie rock and punk scene. Their songs incorporate various aspects of the genres, most typically expressing fast tempos and prominent power chord guitar riffs in addition to rhythmic groove and emotional lyrics. Despite the indie nature of their music, the band has enjoyed worldwide commercial success in addition to critical acclaim. Asian Kung-Fu Generation has been cited as one of the best, most balanced modern rock bands to emerge from Japan in the 2000s.

== History ==
=== 1996–2002: Formation and indie releases ===
Asian Kung-Fu Generation was first formed in 1996 when Masafumi Gotoh, Kensuke Kita, and Takahiro Yamada met while attending a music club at Kanto Gakuin University, a private university in Yokohama, Japan. After realizing that they all shared similar musical tastes, the three decided to start their own band. Masafumi Gotoh became the lead vocalist and played rhythm guitar, Kensuke Kita played lead guitar and sang backup and Takahiro Yamada played bass. Drummer Kiyoshi Ijichi joined them later on after parting with another college band he was in. The four then began providing performances at their university as well as throughout the local Yokohama area. After graduating from college, following years of playing in several small venues and having collaborated with fellow Japanese rock musician Caramelman, AKFG released their first indie EP in 2000. The six-track EP contained original lyrics written and sung almost entirely in English. The four spent the remainder of the year playing in clubs and hosting independent events.

The year after, the band made an attempt to attain airplay on indie radio stations for their first Japanese single, "Konayuki" (粉雪). The song was eventually picked up by a popular radio DJ and put into heavy rotation on the station FM Yokohama upon the demand of listeners. AKFG then released another indie EP, I'm Standing Here. This time, however, the band wrote songs in Japanese. At this time, the band had begun drawing an increasingly large number of audiences to their shows held in clubs in the districts of Shibuya, Shimokitazawa, Kichijōji, and Tokyo.

=== 2002–2004: Hōkai Amplifier and Kimi Tsunagi Five M ===
On November 25, 2002, after contributing to the Under Flowers Records compilation, Whatch You Gonna Do?, Asian Kung–Fu Generation officially released their first major-label mini-album, Hōkai Amplifier (崩壊アンプリファー). The group enlisted internet radio host and graphic artist Yusuke Nakamura to design and compose their single and album covers. The critically acclaimed EP topped the High Line Records' weekly chart for two consecutive weeks and peaked at number thirty-five on the Oricon indies sales chart.

As a result of its success, Hōkai Amplifier was re-released on April 23, 2003, by the band's new record label, Ki/oon Records, a subsidiary of Sony Music Japan. A month later, AKFG held their first headline show at Shimokitazawa Club Shelter. That same summer, the band performed at the annual rock festivals of Fuji Rock Festival 03's "ROOKIE A GO GO" and Summer Sonic '03 in Tokyo and Osaka. On August 6, the band released their major-label debut single, "Mirai no Kakera" (未来の破片), with their second single, "Kimi to Iu Hana" (君という花), following shortly after. Days later, AKG held the first edition of what would become an annual festival, the Nano-Mugen Fes. The event took place on August 11 at the Shinjuku LOFT. The band followed it up by releasing their first full-length studio album, Kimi Tsunagi Five M (君繋ファイブエム) on November 19. The LP sold over 250,000 copies and landed in the number five spot on the Oricon charts in its first week. As their fame and following grew, fans began calling the band simply Ajikan (アジカン), an abbreviation of how the band's name is rendered in Japanese.

=== 2004–2005: Sol-fa ===
As they entered 2004, AKFG received the award for Best New Artist while their video for "Kimi to Iu Hana" won the award for Best Music Video at the SPACE SHOWER Music Video Awards. From January 19 to February 25, AKG held their first headlining tour: Five Nano Seconds. The tour consisted of thirteen shows. On July 1, the band held their third ASIAN KUNG-FU GENERATION presents Nano-Mugen Festival at the Tokyo arena Nippon Budokan. Over the course of the following summer, the band played in more than ten summer rock festivals, including Meet The World Beat, Rock In Japan Fes 04, and Fuji Rock Festival 04.

Over the course of the year, the band released four more singles: "Siren" (サイレン), "Loop & Loop" (ループ＆ループ), "Rewrite" (リライト) and "Kimi no Machi Made" (君の街まで), before finally releasing their second full-length album, Sol-fa (ソルファ) on October 20. The album debuted at number-one on the Oricon charts where it stayed for two consecutive weeks and eventually went on to sell more than 600,000 copies. The album received critical praise for its honed sound and high production quality, which thoroughly nullified the language barrier that frequently impeded non–Japanese-speaking audiences. This notion became evident following the domestic release of Sol-fa, when AKFG fans from around the world organized themselves and petitioned for copies of the second album to be distributed outside Japan. The support for Ajikan eventually resulted in Tofu Records striking a contract to release Sol-fa in the United States on October 18, 2005. Additionally, the song "Rewrite" found recognition both domestically as well as on an international level when it was chosen as the fourth opening theme for the anime series Fullmetal Alchemist. Around the same time, their song "Haruka Kanata" enjoyed similar recognition after being used for the second opening of the anime series Naruto. Asian Kung–Fu Generation spent the next two months on a national tour consisting of twelve shows called "Tour SUI CUP 2004 -No! Member, November." The tour included a prestigious headliner at Nippon Budokan arena. The four then released a year-end video DVD, izō Sakuhinshū Vol. 1 on November 26. The DVD is compilation of the music videos for all singles from "Haruka Kanata" to "Kimi no Machi Made," including a never before seen clip of "Siren." The video contains audio commentary for each song, a making-of featurette, and live footage derived from their concerts. In 2016, the song "Re:Re:" was rerecorded and used as the opening for the anime Erased.

=== 2005–2007: Fanclub and Feedback File ===
Due in part to their growing recognition, Asian Kung-Fu Generation would dedicate a significant amount of time the next couple of years going on extensive national tours. Between March 14 and June 26 of 2005, AKFG went on an extensive sold-out Re:Re Tour, performing at forty-eight concerts in thirty-eight cities throughout Japan. At the same time, the band released their second DVD, Eizō Sakuhinshū Vol. 2: Live at Budokan +. The two-disc video was the band's very first live DVD, as the first disc contains live footage of the entirety of the final show of their "Tour Suihai 2004 - No!Member, November-," at Budokan, where they performed before an audience of over 10,000 people on December 5, 2004. Meanwhile, the second disc contains clips from their first concert at the Shimokitazawa Shelter Club on November 2, 2004. It also includes behind-the-scenes documentary directed by Toshiaki Toyoda and filmed at Kanto Gakuin University, as well as outtakes from the music video for "Kimi to Iu Hana." Upon its release, the video managed to top the Oricon DVD charts for an entire month. On July 9, AKFG held their fifth Nano-Mugen Festival at Yokohama Arena, where they performed with seven other Japanese and UK bands. To advertise the event, they released a preceding compilation album that retained one song from each band attending the festival. Over the next summer, AKFG attended a host of festivals, including Summer Sonic 05, Rising Sun Rock Fes. 2005, and Rock in Japan Fes. 05. They also appeared as guests on GOGOICHI –SPACE SHOWER CHART SHOW– on November 27 on SPACE SHOWER TV. The band closed the year by releasing the single, "Blue Train" (ブルートレイン), followed up by a brief tour entitled, "Tour SUI CUP 2005 - Winter Dragon" in December.

The band began 2006 with the release of their upcoming album's second single, "World Apart." The single was unique in that it featured a song in which Kensuke Kita stood as lead singer. It was AKFG's first song to achieve number-one single status, also it was the year that the band was finally able to acquire their very own studio. They then took part in live performances in LIVE SUPERNOVA DX on February 16, 2006. On March 15, AKFG released their third full-length album, Fanclub (ファンクラブ). The album peaked at number three and stayed in the Oricon top five for nearly two months. The following month, the band went on a national tour entitled, Count 4 My 8 Beat. Tickets for all thirty-eight shows quickly sold out. AKFG's sixth annual Nano-Mugen Fes. was held at Yokohama Arena. For two days, Asian Kung–Fu Generation and eleven other bands, including six Japanese bands, three American bands and two English bands, performed. Like the previous year, a compilation album was released in July to advertise the Nano-Mugen Festival. After three years of attending the Fuji Rock Fes, AKFG had the opportunity to perform on its coveted primary Green Stage for the first time at Fuji Rock Festival 06.

To commemorate their ten-year anniversary, Asian Kung–Fu Generation released their first compilation album, Feedback File on October 25. Rather than featuring hit singles, the nostalgic album was primarily compiled of B-sides, live performances, and old demos from their early indie days. Even though it retained little new material, the compilation was met by commercial success and managed to debut at number two on the Oricon charts. AKFG then went on a two-month arena tour entitled, Tour Sui Cup 2006-2007: The Start of a New Season. Well over 100,000 fans attended this tour, which traveled through eight cities and featured guest performances by bands from Japan and the United States. In the midst of the tour, AKFG was commissioned by the director of the then-upcoming anime film, Tekkon Kinkreet, to compose a theme song for the movie. The band created a song called, "Aru Machi no Gunjō" (或る街の群青) and released it as a year-end single prior to the film's debut. As a sign of their increasing cultural prominence, the band came to be parodied in a volume of the popular Hellsing manga by members of the Vatican named, "The Vactikung."

=== 2007–2008: Withdrawal and World World World ===
On March 21, the band released another live DVD, Eizō Sakuhinshū Vol. 3 that contained footage of their previous tour. Although they took part in various domestic summer festivals, AKFG gradually became more and more withdrawn over the course of 2007 before halting appearances almost entirely, including the lack of their annual Nano-Mugen festival. Nevertheless, the band released the single "After Dark", which debuted in the top ten on the Oricon charts and was used as the seventh opening for the anime series Bleach.

In March of the following year, the band released their next album, World World World, accompanied by the single "Korogaru Iwa, Kimi ni Asa ga Furu" (転がる岩、君に朝が降る). Despite the lack of media appearances and the significant timespan between releases, the album debuted at #1 on the Oricon album chart.

Just a few months after the album's release, Asian Kung–Fu Generation released their second major-label EP, Mada Minu Ashita ni, on June 11, 2008. The mini-album features songs conceived around the time of the recording of their preceding full-length album. Although the EP spawned no singles, the song "Mustang" managed to peak at number fifteen on the Japan Hot 100. The song was the band's very first entry on the newly established chart.

=== 2008–2009: Surf Bungaku Kamakura ===
The band appeared as a supporting act for a show held at Yokohama Bay Hall by American alternative rock band Third Eye Blind on July 18. Incidentally, Third Eye Blind later appeared for the fourth and final lineup of AKFG's seventh annual Nano-Mugen Festival held at the Yokohama Arena through July 20-21st. The group was but one of a total of sixteen musical acts, originating from Japan, America, and the UK, who performed at the festival alongside Asian Kung–Fu Generation, who later released their third Nano-Mugen disc, Nano-Mugen Compilation 2008. Peaking at number eighteen on the Oricon charts and retaining one song from each of the sixteen groups, the compilation expressed the largest track number within the Nano-Mugen series yet. Additionally, the song "Natsusemi" (夏蝉, Summer Cicada), composed by AKFG just for the compilation, managed to peak at number thirty-six on the Japan Hot 100 despite not being released as a single.

In September, Asian Kung–Fu Generation had the opportunity to play side by side with Weezer, a California-based alternative rock band that had played a major influence on their music. The WEEZER FESTIVAL was Weezer's first tour to Japan in three years and in promotion of their The Red Album, they performed on September 13 at Intex Osaka and on the 15 at The National Yoyogi First Gymnasium in Tokyo. Asian Kung–Fu Generation, along with fellow Japanese rock band Going Under Ground, performed on both the Osaka and Tokyo stage.

They later released their twelfth single Fujisawa Loser in October followed by their fifth studio album Surf Bungaku Kamakura.

=== 2009–2012: Magic Disk and Best Hit AKG ===
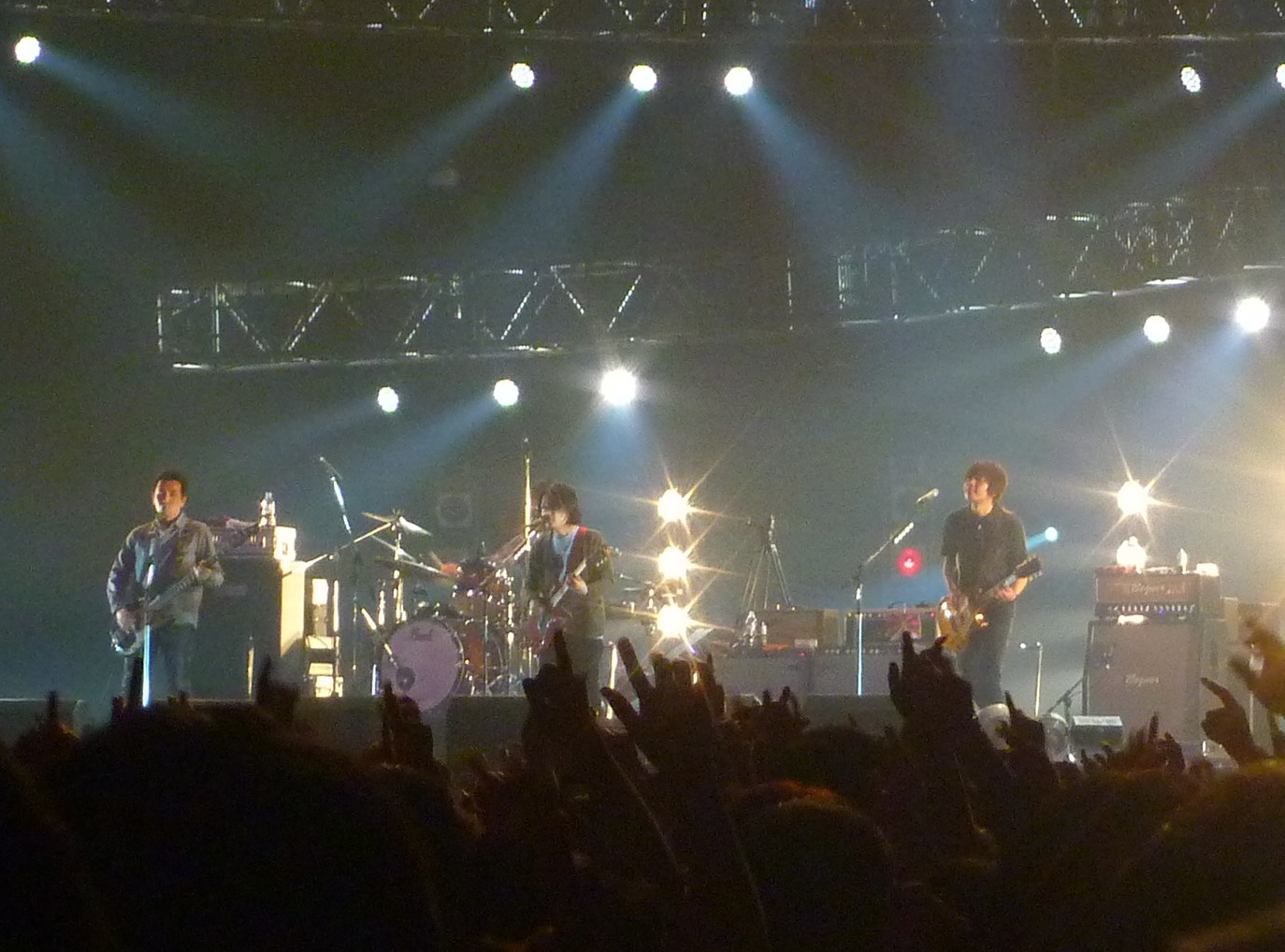
Asian Kung-Fu Generation performing at Countdown Japan, December 2011

After a busy 2008, the band spent time touring and writing new material. In March 2009, they released their fifth DVD, Eizō Sakuhinshū Vol. 5, featuring a collection of live videos from various live events in 2008. In July 2009, Asian Kung–Fu Generation held their annual Nano-Mugen festival. This was accompanied by Nano-Mugen Compilation 2009, which featured a new track, "Yoru no Call" (夜のコール, Call of the Night), and tracks from each of the other 16 bands that partook in the festival. At the conclusion of the festival, Gotoh announced the group had started writing and producing a new album. Immediately following Nano-Mugen, the group kicked off their 2009 festival summer season with performances at Korea's Jisan Valley Rock Festival, "Rock in Japan Festival 2009", and "Sweet Love Shower Festival 2009". In October, their sixth DVD, Eizō Sakuhinshū Vol. 6, was released and was also the band's first release on Blu-ray. It featured a concert from their March 2009 hall tour "World World World", which featured a more experimental set design and set list, as well as the use of instruments such as tenori-on and a strings section. The second half of the set included the whole of their 2008 album Surf Bungaku Kamakura from start to finish.

The band released their 13th single, "Shinseiki no Love Song" (新世紀のラブソング, Love Song of the New Century), on December 2, 2009, which featured a DVD of songs from the group's appearance at Jisan Valley Rock Festival earlier in the year. At the same time, the band announced that at the end of March 2010, they would be releasing a new single titled "Solanin", which was to be used as the theme song to the film of the same name. The single featured a remix of "Mustang" from Mada Minu Ashita ni, which was a studio mix of the version played on Eizō Sakuhinshū Vol. 6. The track was also used as the ending theme to the movie.

In January 2010, Gotoh posted an entry into his diary stating that they had recorded a Japanese version of The Rentals song "A Rose Is a Rose". In February 2010, the band spent 2 weeks in New York, in which they recorded 2 songs. In the same month it was announced that the band would provide the opening theme for the anime The Tatami Galaxy, which features character design from Yusuke Nakamura, the same artist who illustrates the Ajikan CD covers. The song was titled "Maigoinu to Ame no Beat" (迷子犬と雨のビート, A Stray Puppy and the Beat of the Rain). A single release is to follow.

In April 2010, Gotoh posted an entry into his diary stating that the band's 6th full-length album would be released in June 2010 with the title "Magic Disk" (マジックディスク, Majikkudisuku).

In March 2011, the 2011 Tōhoku earthquake and tsunami caused the band to cancel the rest of their "2010-2011 Vibration of Music Tour", due to some touring equipment being damaged. Within the next week after the disaster, Masafumi Gotoh published lyrics on his diary, inspired by the disaster, called "Suna no Ue" (砂の上, On the Sand). The song was later recorded, and was played on live radio airplay around Japan. In the next month, Gotoh later announced in his diary that they were in the studio, recording new songs. Two new AKG songs were released on the Nano-Mugen Compilation 2011, titled "Hikari" and "All right Part 2".

In July 2011, Asian Kung-Fu Generation played live at "Jisan Valley Rock Festival" an annual 3 day music festival held every July at Jisan Valley Ski Resort, in Icheon, South Korea.

In November 2011, the band announced that they would release a new single and a best of album. The single, titled "Marching Band", was released on November 30 and the best of album, Best Hit AKG, was released in January 2012 Gotoh announced via Twitter that the best of album does not represent the end of the band, and that they still plan on releasing an original album in summer, 2012.

=== 2012–2015: Landmark and Feedback File 2 ===
On April 11, 2012, AKFG released the single, titled "Kakato de Ai o Uchinarase" (踵で愛を打ち鳴らせ, Ring Out Love with Your Heel). It was composed by the band's lead guitarist, Kita. In June 2012, a promotional video was released for a song titled "Yoru o Koete" (夜を越えて, Beyond the Night), in promotion of the Nano-Mugen Festival 2012. It is featured on the Nano-Mugen Compilation 2012, released on June 27, 2012.

A few days before the 2012 Nano-Mugen Festival, it was announced that a new single, titled "Sore dewa, Mata Ashita" (それでは、また明日, Well Then, See You Again Tomorrow), will be released on July 25, 2012. It is also the theme song for Naruto the Movie: Road to Ninja, which was released on July 28. After the 2012 Nano-Mugen Festival, it was also announced on the band's website that a new album would be released on September 12, 2012, titled Landmark, and that a tour would follow in the following month of October in support of the album.

A new single, titled "Ima o Ikite" (今を生きて, Live Now), was released on February 20, 2013, and it was featured in a movie, titled Yokomichi Yonosuke (横道世之介).

In 2013, Asian Kung-Fu Generation undertook their first European tour, with 3 dates in 3 countries consisting of London (31 May), Paris (2 June) and Cologne (3 June). In September 2013, the band celebrated their 10th anniversary of signing onto a major label by holding a special concert over two days at Yokohama Stadium. This concert included guest performers from the HIATUS, The Rentals, Straightener, and Fujifabric.

In December of that year, to celebrate their 10th anniversary they embarked on their first Asia Circuit tour, performing in Korea, Singapore, and Taiwan together with Straightener (also celebrating their 10th anniversary) and a local band of each respective country.

=== 2015–2017: Wonder Future and Sol-fa 2016 ===
In May 2015, the band released their eighth album, Wonder Future, produced by Masafumi Gotoh. The only single from the album, "Easter" was released in March 2015. To promotion album, they released two music video, "Opera Glasses" and "Planet of the Apes". They held tour named "Asian Kung-fu Generation Tour 2015 (Wonder Future)" from July until October 2015 in Japan and November in Europe. In March 2016, they released live DVD and Blu-ray, Eizo Sakuhin Shu Vol.12 that contains their tour concert in Tokyo International Forum.

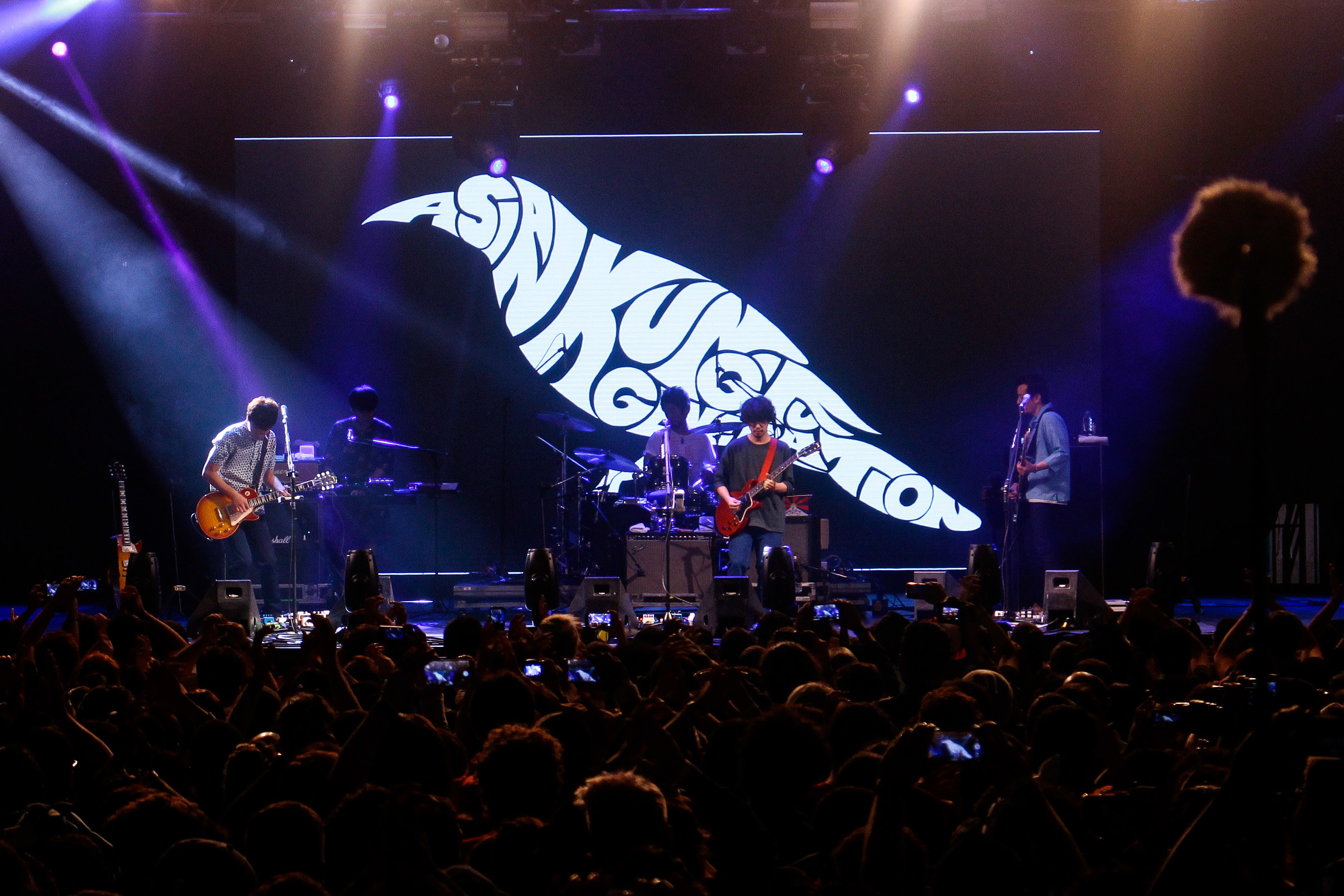
Performing in São Paulo at Anime Friends 2017

In 2016, the band released three singles that used as theme song for movie and anime. "Right Now" for theme song 2016 film, Pink and Gray, while the re-recording of "Re:Re:" and "Blood Circulator" used as opening theme song for Erased and Naruto Shippuden respectively. To celebrate their 20th anniversary live, they re-recorded Sol-fa and held tour with setlist contain all songs from Sol-fa. In 2017, they released their tribute album AKG Tribute, box-set AKG Box –20th Anniversary Edition– that contains their album from Hōkai Amplifier to Wonder Future and released live DVD and Blu-ray, Eizo Sakuhin Shu Vol.13. They also released single "Kōya o Aruke" and was used as the theme song for the 2017 anime film, The Night Is Short, Walk On Girl. In July 2017, they held tour in USA and South America. In December 2017, they toured with Feeder and performed a new song called "Sleep", written by Feeder.

=== 2018–2021: Best Hit AKG 2 and Hometown ===
In March 2018, they released Best Hit AKG 2 alongside two bootleg albums, HONE and IMO. They held a tour called "BONES & YAMS" (based two bootleg album artwork), with Nick Moon as opening act. In September 2018, the band released a single "Boys & Girls". In December 2018, they released their ninth studio album Hometown with limited edition contains Can't Sleep EP. They decided to split album because they didn't want people to pay double the amount for separate CDs and listening album for one hour more is too long. Both album has collaboration with other musicians such as Rivers Cuomo, Butch Walker, Grant Nicholas, Ayaka Tatamino, Atsushi Horie, and The Charm Park. To promote the new album, the band have announced a nationwide tour in Japan set for March to July. They also released music videos for "Hometown", "Haikyo no Kioku", "Sleep", "UCLA", "Motor Pool", and "Rainbow Flag", with three latter were result from Creator Auditions hosted by koe Inc. In May 2019, they released double A-side single, "Dororo/Kaihōku". "Dororo" was used as the second opening for 2019 remake anime, Dororo. In October 2019, they had tour called Nano-Iro Electric Tour with Straightener and Ellegarden in three venue, with each band acted as headliner. After the tour, they have announced two concerts in London and Paris alongside two additional concerts in London as opening act for Feeder in November 2019.

In January 2020, they announced tour named Tour 2020 Sui Cup 2 -The Song of Apple- that would be performed in May–June. However, the tour was delayed to October 2020 before they cancelled it due to COVID-19 pandemic. In October 2020, they released new double A-side single, Dialogue/Furetai Tashikametai, with both song were recorded in RAK Studio. They also held special three days concert to replace the cancelled tour.

In June 2021, it was announced Asian Kung-Fu Generation would provide the theme song for the new My Hero Academia movie My Hero Academia: World Heroes Mission called "Empathy". In July 2021, it was announced new single "Empathy" and music video collection called Eizo Sakuhin Shu vol. 17 will release on 4 August 2021. They will also embark on a 25th anniversary tour, titled Quarter-Century, in November 2021. In November 2021, they announced special two night concert named More Than a Quarter-Century at Pacifico Yokohama in March 2022.

=== 2022–present: Planet Folks and Surf Bungaku Kamakura Complete ===
On March 30, 2022, they released their tenth studio album Planet Folks. It included three previous singles alongside "Flowers" from Empathy's B-side and guest musicians such as ROTH BART BARON, Rachel of Chelmico, and OMSB. They released three music videos, "You To You", "De Arriba", and "Hoshi no Yoru, Hikari no Machi" and they held tour named "Tour 2022 (Planet Folks)" from May to November 2022 in Japan. Also in this tour, they replaced their longest support member Ryosuke Shimomura (who wanted to focus on his solo project) with YeYe, Achico, George, and Kikuchi Takuma. Documentary of Planet Folks album called "(Planet Folks) 5-hour liner notes" was released on Youtube and divided into several videos. At 2022 Space Shower Music Awards, they were awarded "Best Respect Artist".

In August 2022, they performed in Summer Sonic 2022 festival for first time since 2005. New single, "Demachiyanagi Parallel Universe" was selected as the opening theme of anime series The Tatami Galaxy's sequel, Tatami Time Machine Blues, which premiered in September 2022. In December 2022, it was announced that the song "Shukuen" by Asian Kung-Fu Generation will be the theme song for the 12th opening of the anime series Boruto: Naruto Next Generations. The single with the same name will be released on February 8, 2023. Also in December 2022, a cover version of "Korogaru Iwa, Kimi ni Asa ga Furu" was used as the ending song for the finale of anime series Bocchi the Rock! On January 18, 2023, the band released the Boruto: Naruto Next Generations opening "Karma" digitally, along with announcing a full CD single to be released on February 8.

On May 4, the band announced they would release a completed version of Surf Bungaku Kamakura on July 5, including a rerecording of the original album, and 5 new songs to cover the stations of the Enoshima Electric Railway line which did not originally have one. Two songs have been released as singles, "Yanagikōji Parallel Universe" and "Nissaka Down Hill", which are B-sides to Demachiyanagi Parallel Universe and Shukuen respectively. A national tour to promote the album later in the year was also announced shortly prior to the album's release.

On May 25, the band provided a song called "Beautiful Stars" for actress Non for her second album, Pursue and the band also featured in the music video.

In August 2023, the band was scheduled as guest in Kana-Boon's concert but cancelled it due to Ijichi tested positive for COVID-19. After he recovered, the band performed in some summer Japan festivals like Rock In Japan, Sweet Love Shower and Rush Ball. The band also performed live in Indonesia for the first time on August 18.

In July 2024, the band will be releasing a singles collection, a two-disc compilation of all A-sides released to commemorate the 20th anniversary of major debut. The collection will also include a re-recording of "Haruka Kanata".

In May and June 2025, the band once again hosted Nano-Mugen Festival after an over decade-long hiatus. It was planned to have an international date for the first time, in Jakarta, however the Indonesian leg was cancelled shortly prior. Coinciding with the festival was the release of a new double A-side single "MAKUAKE/Little Lennon", with the former being the theme song for this year's festival. In August, they headlined the Incheon Pentaport Rock Festival in South Korea.

On 25 October 2025, the band was an opening act for the Oasis concerts in Japan, supporting the first of two performances at Tokyo Dome. In October 2025, they announced a two-day solo concert at Ariake Arena in Tokyo and along with a concert in Jakarta, Indonesia to celebrate 30th anniversary of the band in April 2026. On 31 December 2025, 30th anniversary tour dates were announced in Mexico City and Santiago, Chile in June and July 2026 respectively. On 13 February 2026, Anime Friends announced that the band would appear in Sao Paulo, Brazil as well.

On 12 February 2026, the band announced a new EP called "Fujieda EP" to be released on 25 March. It will include four tracks, including a cover of a Spitz song, marking the second time the band has covered them. The EP was recorded at a newly opened studio called MUSIC inn Fujieda, operated by a non-profit organisation founded by Gotoh. On 5 March 2026, a new single called "Skins" was announced for release in May, with the song to be used as the opening theme to the third cour of anime series Dr.STONE SCIENCE FUTURE.

In October and November 2026, the band will embark on a national live house tour titled "Midage Fanclub", to commemorate the 20th anniversary of the album Fanclub. Following this, they will then go on a hall tour starting in January 2027, and an arena tour in April 2027, which is a culmination of the 30th anniversary celebrations. Additionally, Gotoh will be holding a special birthday party on his 50th birthday, 2 December 2026.

On 16 October 2026, the band announced a new self-titled album to be released on 27 January 2027, which will include songs recorded at Abbey Road Studios in London.

== Musical style ==
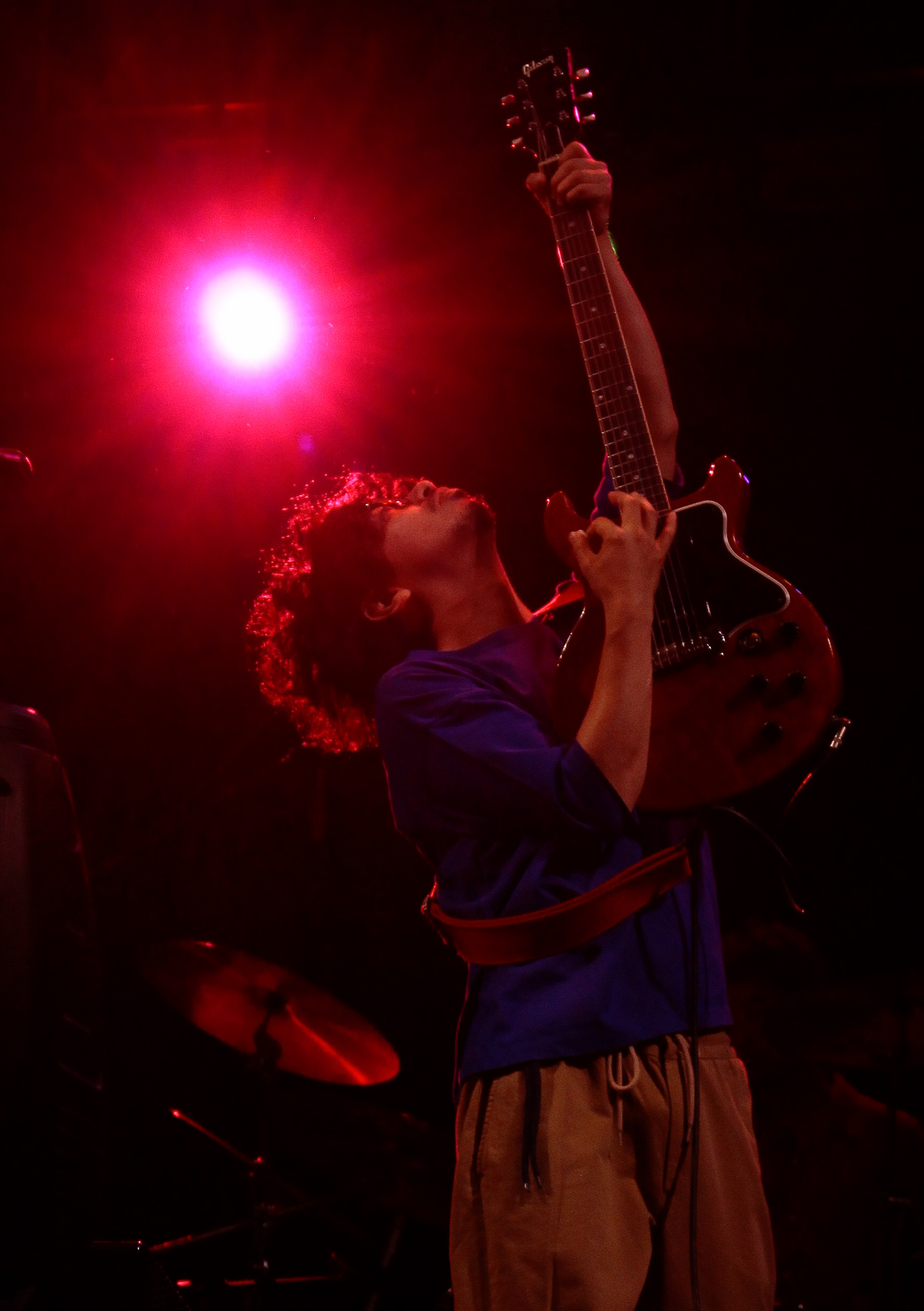
Masafumi Gotoh

The musical style of Asian Kung-Fu Generation largely has been influenced by seminal 1990s alternative rock and indie-rock bands, particularly Weezer, Oasis, Teenage Fanclub, Radiohead, Supergrass, Manic Street Preachers, Smashing Pumpkins and Beck. This is in conjunction with a wide variety of other genres, ranging from pop, garage, new wave, hardcore punk, and heavy metal. Members of Asian Kung-Fu Generation have imparted to being fans of Western music groups including The Beatles, XTC, The Pet Shop Boys and King Bee as well as fellow Japanese acts such as Number Girl, Eastern Youth, and Hi-Standard. As a result, many of the band's songs maintain a distinct balance of various elements of the genres, most typically expressing fast tempos, strong melodies, clear vocals, loud and distorted guitars, power chord sequences, rhythmic groove, hook-filled refrains, transgressive lyrics, and emotional delivery. Over the course of their career, the members of Asian Kung-Fu Generation, like most Japanese rock musicians, prefer to slightly expand their core sonic style with every release rather than drastically reinvent themselves. However, with their sixth studio album, the band uncharacteristically incorporated brass instruments, synthesizers, and string arrangements into their music. Ijichi is also a skilled pianist and can be heard playing an excerpt of "Claire de Lune" from French composer Claude Debussy's Suite bergamasque on their third studio album Fanclub.

Leader singer Masafumi Gotoh typically employs quiet-loud dynamics, as his vocal style often alternates between soft, melodic singing, and harder, harsher, yelling. Gotoh serves as the band's main songwriter and is responsible writing a majority of their lyrics alongside playing the rhythm guitar. However, Gotoh tends to share songwriting duties among his bandmates, particularly with bassist Takahiro Yamada, whom he sometimes harmonizes with on songs. Lead guitarist Kensuke Kita also serves as a backup singer, and has been known to sing lead vocals on occasion.

== In popular culture ==
Asian Kung-Fu Generation is the original band on which the fictional band in Bocchi the Rock! "Kessoku Band" is based.

== Band members ==
Current members

- Masafumi Gotoh – lead vocals, rhythm guitar
- Kensuke Kita – lead guitar, backing vocals
- Takahiro Yamada – bass, backing vocals
- Kiyoshi Ijichi – drums, percussion, keyboards

Touring members

- Achico – backing vocals (2022–present)
- George (Mop of Head) – keyboards (2022–present)

Former touring members

- Daisuke Kanazawa – keyboards (2010–2011)
- Kenta Yamamoto – keyboards (2010)
- Ai Iwasaki – backing vocals (2012–2013)
- Shigeo Mihara – percussion (2012–2013)
- Tadashi Ueda – keyboards, guitar (2012–2013)
- Ryōsuke Shimomura – keyboards, guitar, percussion, backing vocals (2013–2021)
- Takuma Kikuchi (Mop of Head) – keyboards (2022)
- YeYe – backing vocals (2022)

== Event appearances ==
2002

- December 23 – ELVIS Jr. -HARAJUKU BURNING

2003

- June 13 – Space Shower Retsuden Vol. 27 ~Kōshō's Feast~
- July 27 – FUJI ROCK FESTIVAL '03
- August 2 - August 3 – SUMMER SONIC 2003
- August 23 – MONSTER baSH 2003
- August 30 – COOL CAMP '03 "R-NIGHT!!!!!"
- September 15 – RADIO BERRY Veriten Live 2003
- October 17 – MINAMI WHEEL 2003
- November 4 – NANA-IRO ELECTRIC TOUR
- November 12 – TOWER RECORD Shinjuku Store 5th Anniversary Event
- November 15 – JAPAN CIRCUIT Vol. 14
- December 29 – COUNTDOWN JAPAN 03/04
- December 31 – DI:GA STYLE 2004

2004

- March 31 – fuzz maniax supported by smartSHIBUYA-AX
- April 15 – Space Shower Retsuden Special Edition 3rd Anniversary Grand Banquet
- April 16 – ART-SCHOOL SECOND-COMING SPECIAL KINOSHITA NIGHT Vol. 12
- May 7 – Sony Music Fes. 2004 Ki/oon Records
- May 13 – REQUESTAGE 2
- May 15 – J-WAVE VIVA! ACCESS
- July 25 – FM802 MEET THE WORLD BEAT 2004
- July 30 – FUJI ROCK FESTIVAL '04
- August 3 - August 4 – NANA-IRO ELECTRONIC TOUR
- August 7 – ROCK IN JAPAN FESTIVAL 2004
- August 11 – Rock Rock Konnichiwa! in Sendai
- August 13 – RISING SUN ROCK FESTIVAL 2004 in EZO
- August 18 – TREASURE052 2004 ~rainbow surprise~
- August 21 – MONSTER baSH 2004
- August 22 – Sky Jamboree 2004 ~Dream Matching~
- August 28 – SETSTOCK '04
- August 29 – RUSH BALL 2004
- September 20 – SPACE SHOWER TV SWEET LOVE SHOWER 2004

2005

- February 3 – Telstar Emergency Meeting
- February 5 - February 6 – SONICMANIA 2005
- April 29 – ARABAKI ROCK FEST.04292005
- July 26 – CLUB LINER 1-Month Anniversary Live
- August 7 – ROCK IN JAPAN FESTIVAL 2005
- August 11 – SUMMER SONIC EVE
- August 13 - August 14 – SUMMER SONIC 2005
- August 20 – RISING SUN ROCK FESTIVAL 2005 in EZO
- December 4 – LOCK ON ROCK
- December 30 – COUNTDOWN JAPAN 05/06

2006

- January 16 – ELLEGARDEN SPACE SONIC TOUR 2005-2006
- February 16 – LIVE SUPERNOVA
- June 2 – Pearl Drums 60th Anniversary Super Live -5 Days
- July 28 – FUJI ROCK FESTIVAL '06
- November 30 – ELLEGARDEN ELEVEN FIRE CRACKERS TOUR 06-07
- December 17 – Electric Rental 2

2007

- April 27 – REQUESTAGE 5
- April 29 – ARABAKI ROCK FEST.07
- May 6 – Giant Night SP
- July 24 – BEA presents F-X 2007
- July 29 – INCHEON PENTAPORT ROCK FESTIVAL 2007
- August 4 – ROCK IN JAPAN FESTIVAL 2007
- August 18 – RISING SUN ROCK FESTIVAL 2007 in EZO
- August 25 – MONSTER baSH 2007
- September 1 – TREASURE05X 2007 ~stormy stadium~
- September 1 – SPACE SHOWER SWEET LOVE SHOWER 2007
- September 2 – SOUND MARINA 2007 ~Feel the Voice Special~
- September 16 – RADIO BERRY Veriten Live 2007 Special
- September 18 – Analogfish 2007 HALF YEAR Presentation "SIX PISTOLS-extra"
- October 12 – SCHOOL OF LOCK! LIVE TOUR YOUNG FLAG 07
- December 30 – COUNTDOWN JAPAN 07/08
- December 31 – COUNTDOWN JAPAN 07/08 -WEST-

2008

- April 27 – REQUESTAGE 6
- September 14 – SCHOOL OF LOCK! LIVE TOUR YOUNG FLAG 08
- November 9 – "Surf Bungaku Kamakura" Release Commemorative Live

2009

- August 1 – ROCK IN JAPAN FESTIVAL 2009
- August 22 – Rock Rock Konnichiwa! in Sendai ~10th Anniversary Special~
- August 29 – SPACE SHOWER SWEET LOVE SHOWER 2009
- September 5 – SCHOOL OF LOCK! LIVE TOUR YOUNG FLAG 09

2010

- April 11 – JAPAN CIRCUIT -Vol. 48- WEST ~Yamazaki's Deadly Battle Arc~
- April 16 – THE BACK HORN presents "KYO-MEI Tournament"
- April 18 – J-WAVE TOKYO REAL-EYES "LIVE SUPERNOVA 50 DX"
- April 29 – REQUESTAGE 8
- May 1 – ARABAKI ROCK FEST.10
- May 29 – ROCKS TOKYO 2010
- July 17 – KESEN ROCK FESTIVAL '10
- August 1 – FUJI ROCK FESTIVAL '10
- August 14 – RISING SUN ROCK FESTIVAL 2010 in EZO
- August 16 – the HIATUS ANOMALY TOUR 2010

=== List of overseas performances ===
- Pentaport Rock Festival, South Korea
  - 2007 (July 29)
  - 2025 (August 1; as headliner)
- Jisan Valley Rock Festival, South Korea
  - 2009 (July 26)
  - 2011 (July 30)
- Megaport Festival, Taiwan
  - 2024 (March 31)
- 2007 – "Tour Sui Cup 2007 ~Project Beef~"
  - Ghost Theater, Seoul, South Korea
- 2012 – "LIVE direct from Tokyo FM vol.1 Asian Kung-Fu Generation"
  - Legacy Taipei, Taiwan (November 18)
- 2013 – Earth × Heart Asia Circuit (with Straightener)
  - UNIQLO AX, Seoul. South Korea (December 17)
  - SCAPE, Singapore (December 20)
  - Legacy Taipei, Taiwan (December 22)
- 2013 – "ASIAN KUNG-FU GENERATION 2013 European Tour"
  - O2 Academy Islington, London, UK (May 31)
  - Le Bataclan, Paris, France (June 2)
  - Gloria Theater, Cologne, Germany (June 3)
- 2015 – Tour 2015 "Wonder Future" - UK/Europe
  - Werkstatt, Cologne, Germany (November 7)
  - O2 Academy Islington, London, UK (November 8)
  - La Machine, Paris, France (November 10)
- 2015 – Tour 2015 "Wonder Future" - Latin America
  - Movistar Arena (Super Japan Expo), Santiago, Chile (November 14)
  - Teatro Carioca, Sao Paulo, Brazil (November 15)
  - Teatro VORTERIX, Buenos Aires, Argentina (November 18)
  - Plaza Condesa, Mexico City, Mexico (November 20)
- 2017 – "ASIAN KUNG-FU GENERATION World Tour 2017"
  - Teragram Ballroom, Los Angeles, USA
  - The Novo, Los Angeles, USA
  - Transamerica Expo Center (Anime Friends), Sao Paulo, Brazil (July 8, 9)
  - Barranco Arena, Lima, Peru (July 12)
  - Plaza Condensa, Mexico City, Mexico (July 14)
  - Centro de Eventos do Ceará (SANA Expo), Fortaleza, Brazil (July 16)
- 2019 – Tour 2019 "Hometown"
  - Dingwalls, London, UK (November 24)
  - Backstage by the Mill, Paris, France (November 28)
- 2023 – Live in Jakarta
  - Tennis Indoor Stadium Senayan, Jakarta, Indonesia (August 18)
- 2024 – Live in Chile and Mexico
  - Teatro Caupolican (Super Japan Expo), Santiago, Chile (May 23)asian
  - Circo Volador, Mexico City, Mexico (May 26)
- 2026 – 30th Anniversary Tour
  - GBK Basketball Hall, Jakarta, Indonesia (April 28)
  - Pepsi Center, Mexico City, Mexico (June 28)
  - Parque de la Exposición, Lima, Peru (July 1)
  - Teatro Caupolican, Santiago, Chile (July 3)
  - Anhembi Convention Center (Anime Friends), Sao Paulo, Brazil (July 5)

== Discography ==
Studio albums

- Kimi Tsunagi Five M (2003)
- Sol-fa (2004)
- Fanclub (2006)
- World World World (2008)
- Surf Bungaku Kamakura (2008)
- Magic Disk (2010)
- Landmark (2012)
- Wonder Future (2015)
- Sol-fa 2016 (2016)
- Hometown (2018)
- Planet Folks (2022)
- Surf Bungaku Kamakura Complete (2023)
- Asian Kung-Fu Generation (2027)

== Awards and nominations ==
American Anime Awards

Year	Nominee / work	Award	Result
2007	"Rewrite" (from anime Fullmetal Alchemist)	Best Anime Theme Song	Won

CD Shop Awards

Year	Nominee / work	Award	Result
2017	Sol-fa	Revisited Award	Won
2021	Nana-Iro Electric Tour 2019 (with Ellegarden and Straightener)	Live Work Award	Won

Japan Gold Disc Award

Year	Nominee / work	Award	Result
2004	Asian Kung-Fu Generation	New Artist of the Year	Won
2005	Sol-fa	Rock & Pop Album of the Year	Won

MTV Video Music Awards Japan

Year	Nominee / work	Award	Result
2005	"Kimi no Machi Made"	Best Rock Video	Nominated
2005	"Kimi no Machi Made"	Best Group Video	Nominated
2006	"World Apart"	Best Rock Video	Nominated
2007	"Aru Machi no Gunjō"	Best Rock Video	Nominated
2011	"Solanin" (from live-action film Solanin)	Best Video from a Film	Nominated

Newtype Anime Awards

Year	Nominee / work	Award	Result
2016	"Re:Re:" (from anime Erased)	Best Theme Song	5th place

Space Shower Music Video Awards

Year	Nominee / work	Award	Result
2004	"Kimi to Iu Hana"	Best New Artist	Won
2005	"Kimi no Machi Made"	Best Concept Video	Won
2006	"Blue Train"	Best Group Video	Won
2008	"After Dark"	Best Rock Video	Won
2009	"Fujisawa Loser"	Conceptual Video	Nominated
2010	"Shinseiki no Love Song"	Best Rock Video	Nominated
2015	"Rolling Stone"	Best Video	Nominated

Space Shower Music Awards

Year	Nominee / work	Award	Result
2016	Asian Kung-Fu Generation	Best Rock Artist	Nominated
2017	Asian Kung-Fu Generation	Best Rock Artist	Nominated
2019	Asian Kung-Fu Generation	Best Group Artist	Nominated
2022	Asian Kung-Fu Generation	Best Respect Artist	Won

Music Awards Japan

Year	Nominee / work	Award	Result
2025	"Rewrite"	Best Revival Hit Song	Nominated
