= Rivers Cuomo discography =

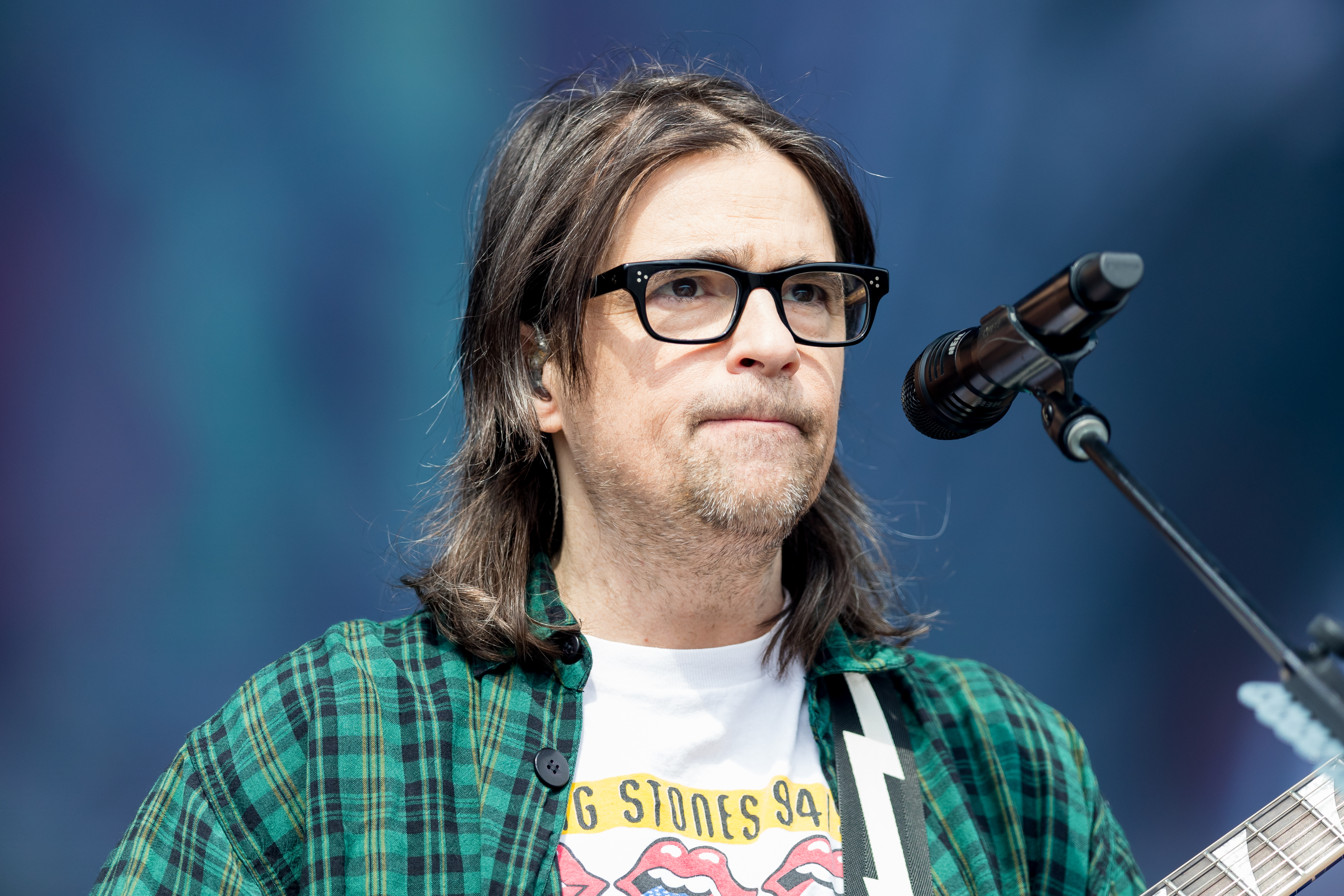

This discography lists the recordings Rivers Cuomo has released as a solo artist.

== Studio albums ==
Year	Album details	Chart positions	
Year	Album details	Billboard Top 200	Top Heatseekers
2007	Alone: The Home Recordings of Rivers Cuomo: Released: December 18, 2007; Label: Geffen	163	1
2008	Alone II: The Home Recordings of Rivers Cuomo: Released: November 25, 2008; Label: Geffen	175	2
2008	Not Alone – Rivers Cuomo and Friends: Live at Fingerprints: Released: April 28, 2009; Label: DGC/Interscope	—	—
2011	Alone III: The Pinkerton Years: Released: December 12, 2011; Label: —	—	—

== Singles ==
=== As lead artist ===
Title	Year	Album
"Medicine For Melancholy"	2018	Non-album single
"Anak Sekolah"	2022	Non-album single

=== As featured artist ===
List of singles as featured artist, with selected chart positions and certifications, showing year released and album name
Title	Year	Peak chart positions								Certifications	Album
Title	Year	US	US Alt.	US Pop	US Dance	AUS	CAN	NZ	UK	Certifications	Album
"Stupid Girl" (Cold featuring Rivers Cuomo)	2003	87	6	—	—	—	—	—	—		Year of the Spider
"Magic" (B.o.B featuring Rivers Cuomo)	2010	10	—	12	—	5	17	6	16	RIAA: 2× Platinum; ARIA: 2× Platinum; MC: Platinum; BPI: Gold; RMNZ: Gold	B.o.B Presents: The Adventures of Bobby Ray
"Can't Keep My Hands Off You" (Simple Plan featuring Rivers Cuomo)	2011	—	—	—	—	45	70	—	—		Get Your Heart On!
"Earthquakey People" (Steve Aoki featuring Rivers Cuomo)	2011	—	—	—	—	—	—	—	—		Wonderland
"Snowed in" (Big Data featuring Rivers Cuomo)	2015	—	—	—	—	—	—	—	—		2.0
"Too Young" (Zeds Dead featuring Rivers Cuomo & Pusha T)	2016	—	—	—	—	—	—	—	—		Northern Lights
"I Still Wanna Know" (RAC featuring Rivers Cuomo)	2017	—	—	—	—	—	—	—	—		Ego
"Sober Up" (AJR featuring Rivers Cuomo)	2017	— (Note: "Sober Up" did not enter the Billboard Hot 100, but peaked at number eight on the Bubbling Under Hot 100 Singles chart.)	1	29	—	—	—	—		RIAA: Platinum; ARIA: Gold; MC: Platinum	The Click
"Gucci Rock N Rolla" (Snakehips featuring Rivers Cuomo & Kyle)	2019	—	—	—	—	—	—	—	—		TBA
"Sound the Alarm" (The Knocks featuring Rivers Cuomo and Royal & the Serpent)	2019	—	—	—	29	—	—	—	—		TBA
"Running Red Lights" (The Avalanches featuring Rivers Cuomo & Pink Siifu)	2020	—	—	—	—	—	—	—			We Will Always Love You
"End of Me" (Billy Talent featuring Rivers Cuomo)	2021	—	—	—	—	—	—	—			Crisis of Faith
"—" denotes a recording that did not chart or was not released in that territory.

== Other appearances ==
- Homie – "American Girls," from the Meet the Deedles soundtrack (1998): vocals, guitar, songwriting and melody
- The Rentals – "My Head Is in the Sun," from Seven More Minutes (1999): co-written with Matt Sharp, but does not appear on the track itself
- Crazy Town – "Hurt You So Bad," from Darkhorse (2002): guitar solo
- Mark Ronson – "I Suck," from Here Comes the Fuzz (2003): vocals, guitar, production
- The Relationship – "Hand to Hold" (2007): co-written with Brian Bell, a reworked version of the early Make Believe era outtake "Private Message"
- Sugar Ray – "Love Is the Answer" (2009): written by and featuring Cuomo
- Adam Lambert - "Pick U Up" (2009): co-writer
- Kevin Rudolf - "Must Be Dreamin'" from To the Sky (2010): vocals, co-writer
- Katy Perry - "Work It" (unreleased track) from Teenage Dream (2010): co-writer
- Miranda Cosgrove - "High Maintenance" from High Maintenance (2011): vocals, co-writer
- All Time Low - "I Feel Like Dancin'" from Dirty Work (2011): co-writer
- Panic! at the Disco - "Freckles" (unreleased track) from Vices and Virtues (2011): co-writer
- Hitomi - "Rollin' wit da Homies" from Spirit (2011): vocals, co-writer
- CeeLo Green - "Anyway" from The Lady Killer (The Platinum Edition) (2011): co-writer
- Charli XCX - "Hanging Around" from Sucker (2014): co-writer
- McBusted - "Getting it Out" from McBusted (2014): co-writer
- Steve Aoki - "Light Years" from Neon Future II (2015): vocals
- Lindsey Stirling featuring Lecrae - "Don't Let This Feeling Fade" from Brave Enough (2017): vocals, co-writer
- Vic Mensa featuring Weezer - "Homewrecker" from The Autobiography (2017): vocals, co-writer; samples Weezer's "The Good Life"
- New Politics - "Tell Your Dad" from Lost In Translation (2017): vocals
- 5 Seconds of Summer - "Why Won't You Love Me" from Youngblood (2018): co-writer
- Asian Kung-Fu Generation - "Clock Work" and "Dancing Girl" from Hometown (2018): co-writer
- The All-American Rejects - "Send Her to Heaven" from Send Her to Heaven EP (2019) : co-writer
- Awolnation - "Pacific Coast Highway in the Movies" from Angel Miners & the Lightning Riders (2020): vocals, co-writer
- Todd Rundgren - "Down with the Ship" from Space Force (2021): vocals, co-writer
- San Holo featuring Weezer - "Wheels Up" from bb u ok? (2021): vocals, co-writer
- Morgan Evans- "Country Outta My Girl" from Country Outta My Girl Remix (2022): vocals, co-writer
