= Songs from the Black Hole =

Unfinished album by Weezer

- Header from The Pinkerton Diaries

Studio album (unfinished) by Weezer
- Recorded: December 1994 – June 1996
- Studios: Electric Lady Studios, New York City; Sound City Studios, Los Angeles
- Genres: Alternative rock; power pop; pop punk; rock opera
- Producer: Weezer

Songs from the Black Hole is an unfinished album by the American rock band Weezer, recorded between 1994 and 1996. The songwriter, Rivers Cuomo, conceived it as a rock opera that would express his mixed feelings about the success of Weezer's 1994 self-titled debut album. Its characters were to be voiced by members of Weezer, plus the guest vocalists Rachel Haden (of That Dog and the Rentals) and Joan Wasser (of the Dambuilders).

Cuomo recorded demos for Songs from the Black Hole over Christmas 1994, and Weezer held recording sessions over the following year. In late 1995, Cuomo enrolled at Harvard University, where his songwriting became darker and more confessional. Weezer abandoned the Black Hole concept and their second album became Pinkerton (1996), which incorporated some songs once intended for Songs from the Black Hole.

Some Songs from the Black Hole tracks were released as Pinkerton B-sides. Demos, lyrics and sheet music were released on Cuomo's compilations Alone (2007), Alone II (2008), Alone III (2011), and on the 2010 Pinkerton reissue. The songs received positive reviews. Rolling Stone described Songs from the Black Hole as a "lost mythical masterpiece".

== Background ==
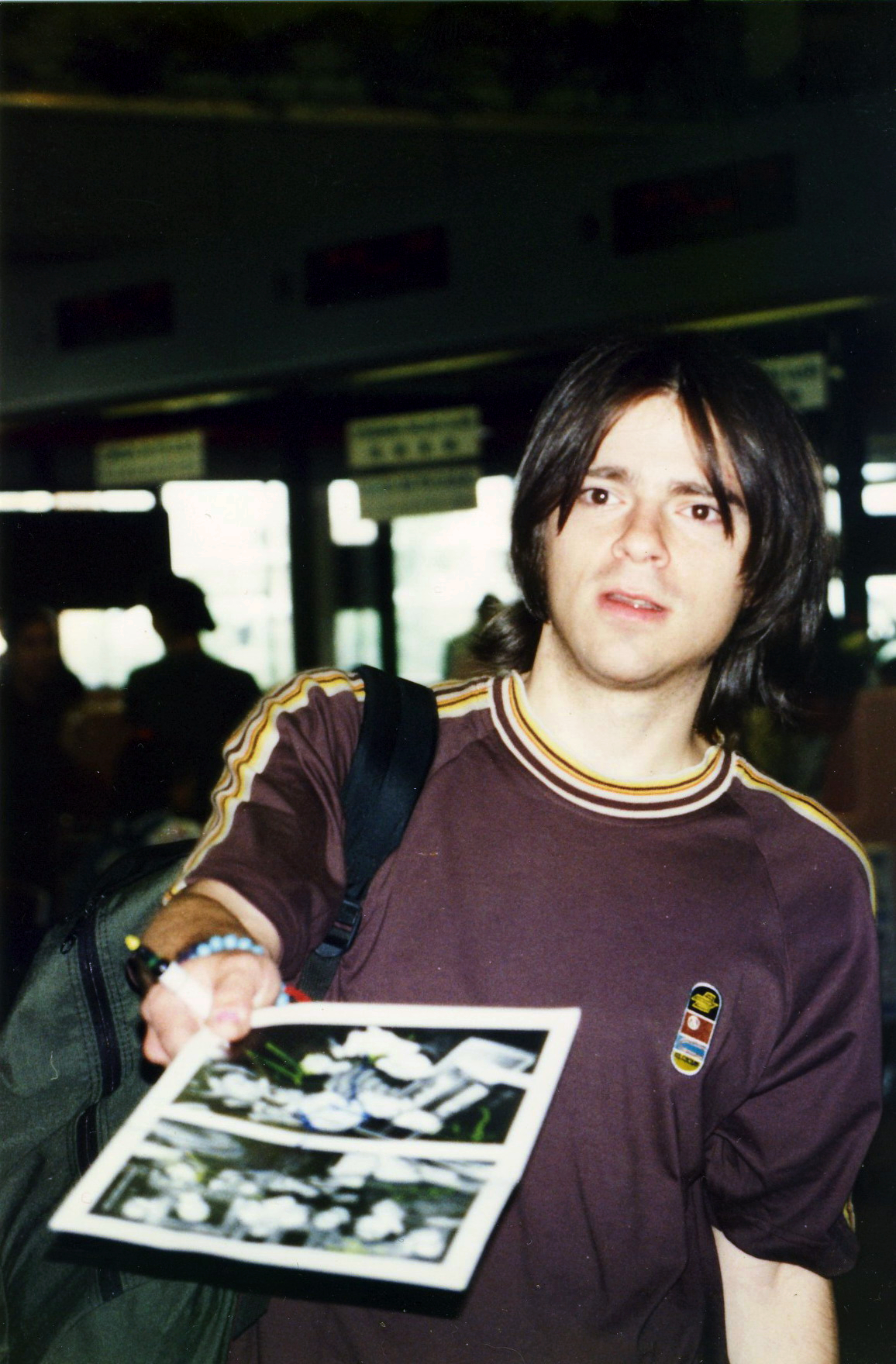
Songwriter Rivers Cuomo (pictured in 1997) conceived the space opera as a metaphor for his mixed feelings about music success.

Weezer's self-titled debut album was released in May 1994, and was certified platinum in January 1995 for sales of more than one million. The songwriter, Rivers Cuomo, had mixed feelings about the success and was uncertain if he was suited to the life of a rock star. He developed an inferiority complex about rock music, feeling his songs were "simplistic and silly", and wanted to write "complex, intense, beautiful" music instead.

While touring with Weezer, Cuomo listened to the operas Aida (1871) and Madama Butterfly (1904), the rock opera Jesus Christ Superstar (1970), and the musical Les Misérables (1980). Inspired by how these works married music and narrative, he wrote a rock opera to explore his feelings about relationships, fame, and life as a touring musician.

== Concept ==
Songs From the Black Hole was to be a science-fiction rock opera with tracks that segued seamlessly, ending with a coda that revisited the major musical themes. The characters were to be voiced by Cuomo, the guitarist Brian Bell, the bassist Matt Sharp, and the Weezer collaborator Karl Koch, along with the guest vocalists Rachel Haden (of That Dog and the Rentals) and Joan Wasser (of the Dambuilders).

The story was set in 2126, when the spaceship Betsy II embarks on a galaxy-wide mission. The crew members Wuan (Bell) and Dondó (Sharp) are excited, but the captain, Jonas (Cuomo), has mixed feelings. The ship's robot, M1 (Koch), urges the crew to stay focused on their objective. Jonas becomes involved in a love triangle with the "good girl" Laurel (Haden), and the "bad girl" Maria (Wasser), the ship's cook, with whom he fathers a child. When the Betsy II reaches its destination, Jonas is disillusioned and longs to return to a simpler life.

Cuomo conceived the story as a metaphor for his conflicted feelings about touring in a successful rock band. The ship's name, Betsy II, was taken from Weezer's first tour bus, nicknamed Betsy. M1 represents Weezer's management and record label; Wuan and Dondó represent the part of Cuomo that was excited about success; Jonas represents his doubts and longing; Laurel and Maria represent his relationships with women.

== Recording and abandonment ==
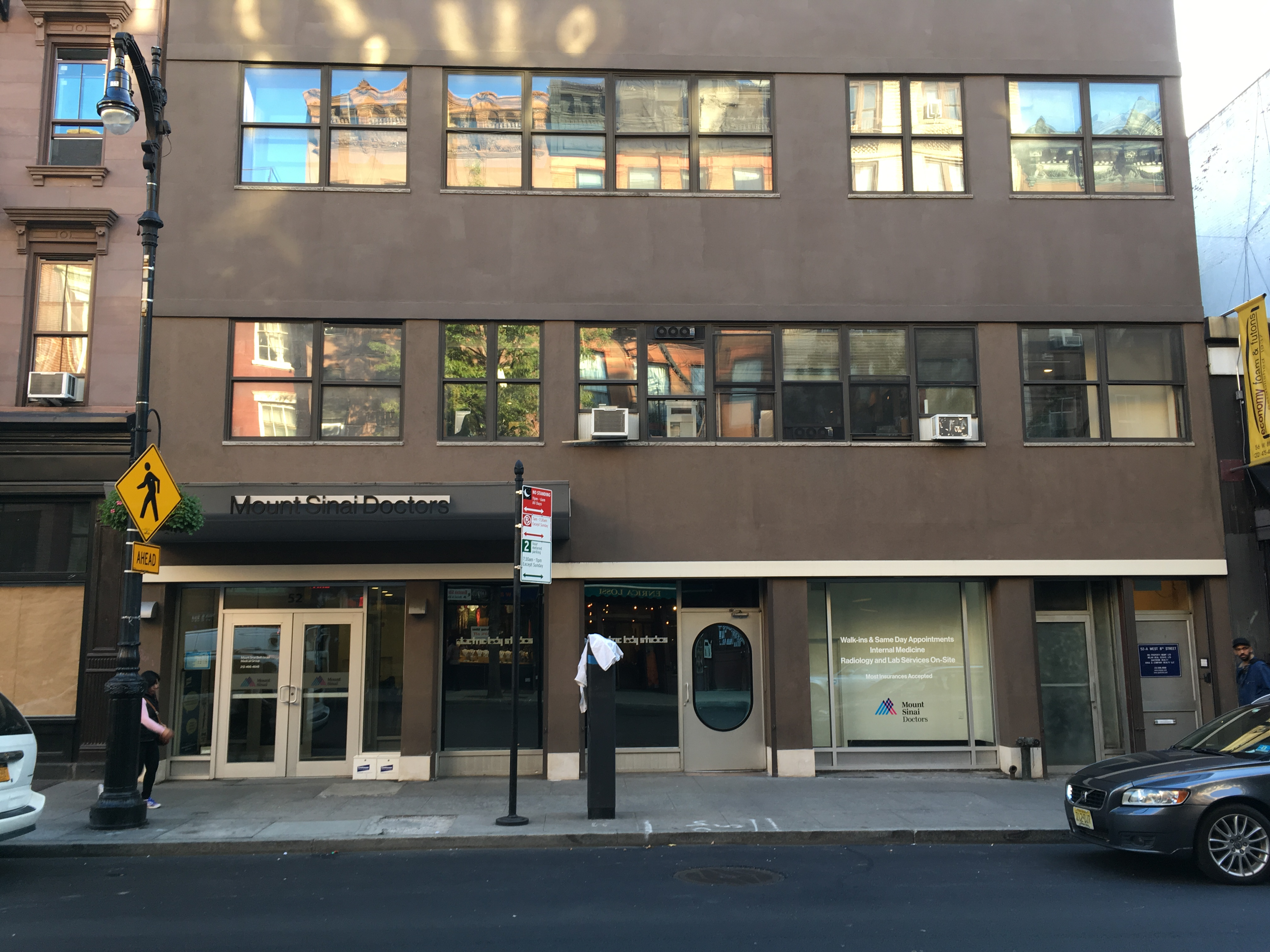
Electric Lady Studios in New York City

Cuomo recorded demos for Songs from the Black Hole on an 8-track recorder at his family home in Connecticut over Christmas 1994. Most of the songs already existed and were rewritten to fit the Songs for the Black Hole concept. Cuomo performed every part himself, pitch-shifting his voice for the female characters. To add a science fiction element to Weezer's sound, he used synthesizers including an Electrocomp 101 he had recently purchased from a pawn shop in rural Connecticut. By February, he had completed an initial track list.

While Weezer was on tour in Europe later that month, Sharp returned to America due to a family emergency, leaving the band in Hamburg for a week. Cuomo and Weezer's drummer, Patrick Wilson, rented a studio and recorded additional demos, including a version of "Blast Off!" using a vocoder for the robot character of M1.

In 1995, Cuomo, who was born with one leg shorter than the other, had extensive surgery to lengthen his leg followed by months of painful physical therapy. This affected his songwriting, as he would spend long periods hospitalized under the influence of painkillers. According to Cuomo, around this time the rock opera concept "started to feel too whimsical for where I was emotionally, going through the pain of the procedure ... I went to a more serious and dark place."

Recording began in August 1995 in Electric Lady Studios, New York City, where Weezer had recorded their debut album, but the sessions were not productive. Further sessions were held in September and October, and Weezer recorded versions of "Blast Off!", "Longtime Sunshine", "I Just Threw Out the Love of My Dreams", "Tired of Sex" and "Getchoo". Weezer had not yet abandoned Songs from the Black Hole, but the songs were recorded, according to Koch, with "no story, no theatrics, no characters".

A clip of "I Just Threw Out the Love of My Dreams", featuring Rachel Haden on lead vocals.

At the end of 1995, wanting to "escape the limelight", Cuomo enrolled at Harvard University to study classical composition. Still recovering from surgery, he became isolated and his songwriting became, in Koch's words, "more visceral and exposed, less playful". In January 1996, Weezer restarted recording in Los Angeles at Sound City Studios with new material. The Songs from the Black Hole tracks "Superfriend", "She's Had a Girl" and "Dude, We're Finally Landing" were recorded, but shelved.

By May 1996, Cuomo had settled on a new direction for Weezer's second album, expressing his loneliness and frustration at Harvard, and abandoned Songs from the Black Hole. His decision was influenced by the release that year of Return of the Rentals, the debut album by Sharp's band the Rentals, as Cuomo felt it shared many musical and lyrical themes.

Weezer's second album became Pinkerton, released on September 24, 1996. It includes "Tired of Sex", "Getchoo" and "No Other One": songs written before Songs from the Black Hole was conceived, rewritten to fit the Black Hole concept and rewritten again for Pinkerton. In June 1996, Weezer recorded the Songs from the Black Hole tracks "I Just Threw Out the Love of My Dreams" (with Haden on vocals) and "Devotion" as B-sides for the Pinkerton singles "The Good Life" and "El Scorcho".

== Demo releases ==
In 1998, Cuomo discussed releasing a compilation of his demos, including demos for Songs from the Black Hole, with Weezer's record label, Geffen Records, but Geffen feared it would dilute the Weezer brand. Fans petitioned to have Songs from the Black Hole released. In 2007, after further negotiation with Geffen, Cuomo released Alone: The Home Recordings of Rivers Cuomo, a compilation of his demos recorded from 1992 to 2007. It includes five Songs From the Black Hole demos: "Longtime Sunshine", "Blast Off!", "Who You Callin' Bitch?", "Dude, We're Finally Landing" and "Superfriend". In 2008, Cuomo released Alone II, which includes "Oh Jonas", "Please Remember" and "Come to My Pod".

In 2010, Geffen released an expanded reissue of Pinkerton, including Cuomo's demo of "You Won't Get With Me Tonight" and a version of "Longtime Sunshine" recorded at Electric Lady Studios in August 1995. In 2011, Cuomo released Alone III: The Pinkerton Years, including a "Suite from the Black Hole" comprising "Oh No, This Is Not For Me", "Tired of Sex", "She's Had a Girl", "What is This I Find?", "Now I Finally See" and "Longtime Sunshine". Alone III was sold exclusively with a book, The Pinkerton Diaries, which collects Cuomo's writing from the era, including Songs from the Black Hole lyrics and sheet music.

== Legacy ==
Reviewing Alone, the Pitchfork critic Jason Crock felt that the Songs from the Black Hole demo "Blast Off!" was the "crown jewel", writing: "It is such a fleeting rush of distortion-driven joy that the edges of the supposed dialogue are entirely blurred, and are hardly essential to enjoy it." He described it as at least on par with the "stellar" Pinkerton B-sides once intended for Songs from the Black Hole. Reviewing Alone II, Crock wrote that its Songs from the Black Hole demos were "goofy, off-the-cuff, and charming".

In 2007, Rolling Stone included Songs from the Black Hole on its list of rock music's lost "mythical masterpieces". Complex included it on its 2012 list of "50 unreleased albums we'd kill to hear", writing that most of Weezer's best material came from the era. In 2014, NME included it on its list of "25 unreleased albums we'd really love to hear", but wrote that Pinkerton was "not exactly the worst second prize". Vice wrote that Songs from the Black Hole "deserves to be ahead of most records in every Weezer fan's collection", declaring it better than most of Weezer's output since.

In 2017, the Stereogum writer Pranav Trewn speculated about how Weezer releasing Songs from the Black Hole instead of Pinkerton might have influenced music: "It's perhaps the greatest 'what if?' in modern music ... What rock looks like both on the radio and in the underground would be enormously different if not for the varying shades [Weezer] popularized." In the 2020s, "I Just Threw Out the Love of My Dreams" became popular on the social media platform TikTok and was certified gold in August 2026.

== Track lists ==
Cuomo compiled two Songs from the Black Hole track lists: the first in February 1995 and the other in late 1995.

Track list 1
No.	Title	Length
1.	"Blast Off!"	2:02
2.	"You Won't Get with Me Tonight"	3:28
3.	"Maria's Theme"	0:26
4.	"Come to My Pod"	1:31
5.	"This Is Not for Me"	0:44
6.	"Tired of Sex"	2:42
7.	"Superfriend"	3:30
8.	"She's Had a Girl"	0:55
9.	"Good News!"	1:05
10.	"Now I Finally See"	0:40
11.	"Getchoo"	2:54
12.	"I Just Threw Out the Love of My Dreams"	2:38
13.	"No Other One"	2:46
14.	"Devotion"	3:16
15.	"What Is This I Find?"	1:20
16.	"Longtime Sunshine"	3:17
17.	"Longtime Sunshine" (Reprise)	0:30
Total length:		33:44

Track list 2
No.	Title	Length
1.	"Blast Off!"	2:02
2.	"Who You Callin' Bitch?"	0:45
3.	"Oh Jonas"	0:26
4.	"Please Remember"	0:37
5.	"Come to My Pod"	1:31
6.	"Oh No, This Is Not for Me"	0:44
7.	"Tired of Sex"	2:42
8.	"She's Had a Girl"	0:55
9.	"Dude We're Finally Landing"	1:05
10.	"Now I Finally See"	0:40
11.	"I Just Threw Out the Love of My Dreams"	2:38
12.	"Lisa"	3:06
13.	"Superfriend"	3:30
14.	"Longtime Sunshine" (Reprise)	0:30
15.	"You Won't Get with Me Tonight"	3:28
16.	"What Is This I Find?"	1:20
Total length:		25:59

=== Notes ===
- "Why Bother?" was included on track list 1, though its placement is unknown.
- "I Just Threw Out the Love of My Dreams" was later released on the B-side of "The Good Life".
- "Devotion" was later released on the B-side of "El Scorcho".
- Three songs were retitled between the first and second track listings:
  - "Maria's Theme" was retitled "Oh Jonas".
  - "This Is Not for Me" was retitled "Oh No, This Is Not for Me".
  - "Good News!" was retitled "Dude We're Finally Landing".
