= Boys & Girls (Asian Kung-Fu Generation song) =

Single by Asian Kung-Fu Generation

from the album Hometown
- Released: September 26, 2018
- Genre: Alternative rock, power pop
- Length: 4:38
- Label: Ki/oon
- Songwriter: Masafumi Gotoh
- Producer: Asian Kung-Fu Generation

Asian Kung-Fu Generation singles chronology
"Kouya wo Aruke" (2017)	"Boys & Girls" (2018)	"Dororo/Kaihōku" (2019)

Music video
- "Boys & Girls" on YouTube

"Boys & Girls" (ボーイズ&ガールズ, Bōizu & Gāruzu) is a song by Japanese rock band Asian Kung-Fu Generation. It was released on September 26, 2018 and reached number 18 on the Oricon. "Boys & Girls" features lyrics described as cheering on all people of today’s generation which thread through a mid-tempo number characterised by powerful and surging guitar riffs. B-side single, "Shukujitsu" was composed by bassist, Takahiro Yamada.

== Music video ==
The music video for "Boys & Girls" was directed by Masaki Ōkita. The video features boys and girls spent their time with joyful and smile. The video ends with Gotoh said something like "Ganbatte" (do your best) to the camera.

== Track listing ==
All lyrics are written by Masafumi Gotoh.

CD
No.	Title	Music	Length
1.	"Boys & Girls" (ボーイズ&ガールズ Bōizu & Gāruzu)	Masafumi Gotoh	4:38
2.	"Shukujitsu" (祝日 Holiday)	Takahiro Yamada	3:08
Total length:			7:46

DVD
No.	Title	Length
1.	"ASIAN KUNG-FU GENERATION America Tour Documentary Pt.1 (Tokyo to Los Angeles)"

== Charts ==
Year	Chart	Peak position
2018	Oricon	18
2018	Japan Hot 100	38

== Release history ==
Region	Date	Label	Format	Catalog
Japan	26 September 2018	Ki/oon	CD	KSCL-3096
Japan	26 September 2018	Ki/oon	CD+DVD	KSCL-3094
Japan	3 November 2018	Ki/oon	7"	KSKL-8536
