= Kōya o Aruke =

Single by Asian Kung-Fu Generation

from the album Hometown
- Released: March 29, 2017
- Genre: Indie rock, alternative rock
- Length: 4:16
- Label: Ki/oon
- Songwriter: Masafumi Gotoh
- Producer: Asian Kung-Fu Generation

Asian Kung-Fu Generation singles chronology
"Blood Circulator" (2016)	"Kōya o Aruke" (2017)	"Boys & Girls" (2018)

Music video
- "Kōya o Aruke" on YouTube

"Kōya o Aruke" (荒野を歩け; "Walk in the Wild Land") is a song by Japanese rock band Asian Kung-Fu Generation. It was released on March 29, 2017, and was used as the theme song for the 2017 anime film, The Night Is Short, Walk On Girl. Yūsuke Nakamura, the illustrator for all of the band's artwork, is also the person in charge of the original character design for the movie.

== Music video ==
The music video for "Kōya o Aruke" was directed by Nakamura Hiroki. The video features a girl walk around the city at midnight until morning, with the band appear on her back as projection screen.

== Track listing ==
All lyrics are written by Masafumi Gotoh.

No.	Title	Music	Length
1.	"Kōya o Aruke" (荒野を歩け "Walk in the Wild Land")	Masafumi Gotoh	4:16
2.	"Omatsuri no Ato" (お祭りのあと "After the festival", Kita on lead vocal)	Kensuke Kita, Takahiro Yamada	2:53
Total length:			7:09

DVD
No.	Title	Length
1.	"Kōya o Aruke" (music video)	4:20
2.	"The Night Is Short, Walk On Girl" (trailer)	1:48
Total length:		6:08

== Personnel ==
- Masafumi Gotoh – lead vocals, rhythm guitar
- Kensuke Kita – lead guitar
- Takahiro Yamada – bass
- Kiyoshi Ijichi – drums
- Asian Kung-Fu Generation – producer

== Charts ==
Chart (2021)	Peak positions
Japanese Singles (Oricon)	15
Japan Hot 100 (Billboard)	14
Japan Hot Animation (Billboard)	1

== Release history ==
Region	Date	Label	Format	Catalog
Japan	29 March 2017	Ki/oon	CD	KSCL-2899
Japan	29 March 2017	Ki/oon	CD+DVD	KSCL-2897
Various	29 March 2017	Ki/oon	Digital download; streaming	
