= Steve Van Wormer =

American actor

- Born: December 8, 1969 (age 56); Grand Blanc, Michigan, U.S.
- Occupation: Actor
- Years active: 1996–present
- Website: www.wormontheweb.com

Steve Van Wormer (born December 8, 1969) is an American actor.

== Early life and career ==
Van Wormer attended Grand Blanc Community High School and Michigan State University and moved to Los Angeles, California upon graduation. He has acted in movies including Groove, Meet the Deedles, and Jingle All The Way. His television appearances include Without a Trace, Johnny Tsunami and Turks, as well as The Tonight Show. Van Wormer has provided voices for video games, including GRID, Operation Flashpoint: Dragon Rising, Turok, X-Men: The Official Game, and Tony Hawk's American Wasteland. He also provided the voice of the Narrator on The Three Friends and Jerry.

== Filmography ==
=== Film ===
| Year | Title | Role | Notes |
|---|---|---|---|
| 1996 | Jingle All the Way | Turbo Man Float Parade Worker | First voice appearance |
| 1997 | Hijacking Hollywood | Tony | |
| 1998 | Meet the Deedles | Stew Deedle | |
| 1999 | Idle Hands | Curtis | |
| 1999 | Johnny Tsunami | Randy, Ronnie | Television film |
| 2000 | The Extreme Adventures of Super Dave | DJ | Direct-to-video |
| 2000 | Groove | Ernie | |
| 2001 | Accidents Don't Happen | Chris | |
| 2001 | Bubble Boy | Mark's Friend | |
| 2002 | The Anarchist Cookbook | Double D | |
| 2003 | Timecop 2: The Berlin Decision | Jason Anderson | Direct-to-video |

=== Television ===
| Year | Title | Role | Notes |
|---|---|---|---|
| 1999 | Turks | Chris | Episode: "After the Pilot" |
| 2000 | The Wild Thornberrys | Jason (voice) | Episode: "Every Little Bit Elps" |
| 2005 | Without a Trace | Kevin | Episode: "End Game" |

=== Video games ===
| Year | Title | Role | Notes |
|---|---|---|---|
| 2005 | Tony Hawk's American Wasteland | | |
| 2005 | Soulcalibur III | Maxi | English dub |
| 2006 | X-Men: The Official Game | Pyro | Credited as Steve Van Womer |
| 2008 | Turok | Henderson | |
| 2008 | Race Driver: Grid | USA Team Mate | |
| 2008 | Soulcalibur IV | Maxi | English dub |
| 2010 | Final Fantasy XIII | Cocoon Inhabitants | English dub |
| 2010 | Sengoku Basara: Samurai Heroes | Additional Voices - Warriors | English dub |
| 2012 | Final Fantasy XIII-2 | Additional Voices | English dub |
| 2012 | Soulcalibur V | Maxi | English dub |
| 2015 | Final Fantasy Type-0 HD | Additional Voices | English dub |
