= Hometown (Asian Kung-Fu Generation album) =

Studio album by Asian Kung-Fu Generation
- Released: December 5, 2018
- Recorded: 2017–2018
- Studio: Landmark Studio
- Genre: Alternative rock, power pop
- Label: Ki/oon Music
- Producer: Asian Kung-Fu Generation

Asian Kung-Fu Generation chronology
Sol-fa 2016 (2016)	Hometown (2018)	Planet Folks (2022)

Singles from Hometown
- 1. "Kōya o Aruke" Released: 29 March 2017; 2. "Boys & Girls" Released: 26 September 2018

Hometown (ホームタウン, Hōmutaun) is the ninth studio album by the Japanese rock band Asian Kung-Fu Generation, released on December 5, 2018. The album was released as a regular and a limited edition, the latter containing the Can't Sleep EP as well as a bonus DVD. Prior to the album's release, it was publicly available to stream for 48 hours.

== Release ==
The album was released on 5 December 2018 in Japan. The album was also available as a limited edition that included an EP titled Can't Sleep. According to Gotoh, the EP tracks were released separately from the album due to concerns over pricing and length.

Two songs from the album were used as theme songs, "Kōya o Aruke" for the anime film The Night Is Short, Walk On Girl and "Hometown" for the drama series Cheers to Miki Clinic, while "Sleep" from the Can't Sleep EP was featured in the film Startup Girls. To promote the album, the band announced a nationwide tour in Japan set for March to July 2019. The final concert of the tour at Pacifico Yokohama was released on live video Eizo Sakuhin Shu 15. They also toured in London and Paris alongside two additional concerts in London as opening act for Feeder in November 2019.

== Track listing ==
All tracks are written by Masafumi Gotoh, except "Clock Work" by Masafumi Gotoh, Rivers Cuomo, and Butch Walker and "Dancing Girl" by Masafumi Gotoh and Rivers Cuomo.

Regular edition
No.	Title	Length
1.	"Clock Work" (クロックワーク Kurokku Wāku)	4:02
2.	"Hometown" (ホームタウン Hōmutaun)	2:57
3.	"Rainbow Flag" (レインボーフラッグ Reinbō Furaggu)	3:40
4.	"Circus" (サーカス Sākasu)	4:37
5.	"Kōya o Aruke" (荒野を歩け Walk in the Wild Land)	4:16
6.	"UCLA" (with Ayaka Tatamino)	5:18
7.	"Motor Pool" (モータープール Mōtā Pūru)	3:23
8.	"Dancing Girl" (ダンシングガール Danshingu Gāru)	3:09
9.	"Sayonara Soldier" (さようならソルジャー Goodbye Soldier)	4:23
10.	"Boys & Girls" (ボーイズ&ガールズ Bōizu & Gāruzu)	4:40

Limited edition (Can't Sleep EP)
No.	Title	Lyrics	Music	Length
1.	"Sleep" (スリープ Surīpu)	Masafumi Gotoh, Grant Nicholas	Masafumi Gotoh, Grant Nicholas	3:14
2.	"Haikyo no Kioku" (廃墟の記憶 Memories of the Ruins)	Masafumi Gotoh	Atsushi Horie	4:25
3.	"Yellow" (イエロー Ierō)	Masafumi Gotoh	Takahiro Yamada	2:57
4.	"Hajimari no Kisetsu" (はじまりの季節 Season of Beginnings)	Masafumi Gotoh	The Charm Park	3:14
5.	"Seija no March" (生者のマーチ The Survivor's March)	Masafumi Gotoh	Masafumi Gotoh	4:42

Limited edition (DVD)
No.	Title	Length
1.	"ASIAN KUNG-FU GENERATION America Tour Documentary Pt.2 (Latin America)"

== Personnel ==
Adapted from the album liner notes.

Asian Kung-Fu Generation

- Masafumi Gotoh – vocals, guitars, recording
- Kiyoshi Ijichi – drums
- Kensuke Kita – guitars, vocals
- Takahiro Yamada – bass guitar, vocals

Additional musicians

- Atsushi Horie – vocals, keyboards (Disc2-2)
- Ryosuke Shimomura – mellotron (Disc2-5)
- Ayaka Tatamino – vocals (Disc1-6)

Production

- Greg Calbi – mastering
- Keishiro Iwatani – recording, mixing
- Kenichi Koga – recording, mixing
- Kenichi Nakamura – recording, mixing

Artwork and design

- Yutaka Kimura – design
- Yusuke Nakamura – illustration

== Release history ==
Region	Date	Label	Format	Catalog
Japan	5 December 2018	Ki/oon	CD	KSCL-3124
Japan	5 December 2018	Ki/oon	2CD+DVD	KSCL-3121
Worldwide	5 December 2018	Ki/oon	Digital	
Japan	15 May 2019	Ki/oon	Vinyl	KSJL-6204
