= Homie (band) =

American band (1997–1998)

- Origin: Boston, Massachusetts, United States
- Genres: Alternative rock, indie rock
- Years active: 1997–1998
- Spinoff of: Weezer
- Past members: Rivers Cuomo; Greg Brown; Matt Sharp; Adam Orth; Yuval Gabay; Mikey Welsh

Homie was an American rock supergroup, which was the side project of Rivers Cuomo, lead singer of the band Weezer. Homie, as it stands now, was a one-time effort, and were only active for a year. Homie officially released just one song, "American Girls", for the soundtrack of the 1998 film Meet the Deedles. For this recording, Cuomo was joined by Greg Brown (member of Cake and Deathray), Matt Sharp (formerly of Weezer, lead singer of The Rentals), Adam Orth of Shufflepuck and Yuval Gabay of Soul Coughing and Sulfur.

== Overview ==
Weezer fans sometimes erroneously apply the Homie moniker to a very different Cuomo-led group of Boston-area musicians that played several shows while Cuomo took time off from Harvard. This group was not Homie, but were played under the guise of Rivers Cuomo solo shows and the material played at these shows were songs Rivers had written for the third Weezer album at the time. This band included members of other local bands such as Chevy Heston, Heretix, and The Shods. This band is often referred to by fans as "The Rivers Cuomo Band", although this was never a name used by the band.

The "Rivers Cuomo Band" formed in 1997 and began playing in October of that year they were a way for Cuomo to release solo music and play small clubs. For the first show the lineup of the band consisted of Rivers Cuomo, Kevin Stevenson, Mikey Welsh, and Zeph Courtney. After Stevenson complained of being unable to work with the current lineup, Welsh and Courtney were replaced with Fred Eltringham and Drew Parsons. This was the lineup for the second show in late October. By the third show Cuomo had come up with a fully developed solo project he called Homie. Further shows were billed as Homie and the material played at Homie shows were exclusive to the Homie project and are assumed to have been intended for the Homie album which was worked on in 1997 and 1998.

The song "Wanda (You're My Only Love)", although originally written as a Weezer song for the film Angus, is often considered to be a Homie song since it was played during the Homie shows. The song "Wanda (You're My Only Love)" was released on Alone - The Home Recordings of Rivers Cuomo. The song "I'll Think About You" was released on Alone II: The Home Recordings of Rivers Cuomo.

On February 20, 2009, a fan-made tribute was distributed by two members of a Weezer fan community, Jack Mergist (The Lifetaker) and Ryan Rowland (runnersdialzero). The tribute features an album worth of high-quality recordings of interpretations of Homie and Cuomo solo songs from this era.

In November 2020, a batch of unreleased songs were released on Cuomo's website, and some of these songs, such as "Hot Tub" or "Rosemary," were possibly originally by Homie.

== Discography ==
- Meet the Deedles Soundtrack
- Unnamed debut album
