= Alone II: The Home Recordings of Rivers Cuomo =

Compilation album by Rivers Cuomo
- Released: November 25, 2008
- Recorded: 1992–2008
- Genre: Alternative rock, lo-fi
- Length: 58:49
- Label: Geffen

Rivers Cuomo chronology
Alone: The Home Recordings of Rivers Cuomo (2007)	Alone II: The Home Recordings of Rivers Cuomo (2008)	Not Alone – Rivers Cuomo and Friends: Live at Fingerprints (2009)

Professional ratings
Review scores
Source	Rating
AllMusic	4.5/5 stars
Entertainment Weekly	A−
Pitchfork Media	(6.0/10)
Rolling Stone	3/5 stars

Alone II: The Home Recordings of Rivers Cuomo is a compilation album by the Weezer songwriter Rivers Cuomo. It is Cuomo's second compilation of demos, after Alone: The Home Recordings of Rivers Cuomo, and includes material written for Weezer's unfinished album Songs From the Black Hole. Alone II debuted at #2 on the Billboard Top Heatseekers chart with first-week sales of 6,000. It was followed by Alone III: The Pinkerton Years (2011).

== Background ==
Rivers Cuomo has recorded a great deal of unreleased material, nearly 800 songs. This material was recorded with Weezer, earlier bands, and self-recorded demos. Despite the large amount of unreleased material that has been made available by Cuomo on the Internet, large portions of his work remain unheard by fans. These include certain demos for The Blue Album, various songs from Weezer's abandoned Songs from the Black Hole album, over a hundred songs he composed and demoed throughout 1999 (songs which he has described as ranging from "drone-y romantic," "abrasive dissonance" and "riffy pop-rock") and over a hundred songs that didn't make the cut for Make Believe.

The idea for the demo collection was made 10 years previously, when Cuomo had brought up the idea to his record company. However, they discouraged him from the idea because they didn't want to "dilute the Weezer name" by putting out less polished material. It wasn't until 10 years later that Cuomo pushed harder for the collection and it gained enough support for a release.

There were some legal problems between Cuomo and Geffen about releasing the album:

[Legal issues] [were] a big part of it because the record company owns all of my demos under Weezer's contract, and my argument was that they aren't Weezer recordings; they're not part of the Weezer record deal, this is my own stuff, I should own this. So we had to negotiate for a long time to reach an agreement as to the legal ownership of the records but we agreed enough that we were able to move forward and put it out.

== Artwork and liner notes ==
The album's cover photo was taken while Cuomo was in high school for his senior portrait. Cuomo elaborated on the photo session:

That is a real photo, and there was not an ounce of irony in the room when that photo was taken. For some reason, I missed the photo session in my high school for my senior portrait, so I had to go to a photo studio in Willimantic, Connecticut. I didn't really have any ideas: the guy just did his thing. And this is what he came up with [laughs]. But it's from the same session as my high school picture.

Much like the first Alone album, Alone II features liner notes. These notes provide detailed descriptions and insight into where Cuomo draws inspiration to write and arrange his music, specifically stating the time and dates where songs were written. Cuomo commented on the liner notes:

When I originally wrote the liner notes, it was about 5,000 words longer and included all the reasons why the songs didn't make it, which I thought was kind of interesting. It ended up feeling kind of negative, like so much of what I was saying was why the songs weren't good enough. It seemed like a strange thing to put in the liner notes. Why would anyone want to buy something like that?

== Track origins ==
- "Victory on the Hill" is an all-trumpet instrumental written and performed by Cuomo in late 1993. Its all-trumpet sequel, "Defeat on the Hill", was written and recorded between touring for Weezer (The Blue Album) in mid-1994.
- "I Want to Take You Home Tonight" was recorded in 2002.
- "Paper Face" was recorded in 1992. A full-band demo was released on the deluxe version of Weezer (The Blue Album).
- "Don't Worry Baby" and "The Purification of Water" were recorded in 1992 and 1993 before the release of the band's debut album, Weezer (The Blue Album).
- "I'll Think About You" was originally written in 1994 and later a contender for the never-released Homie album. The recording featured on this collection was recorded in 1997.
- "Walt Disney" and "Harvard Blues" were recorded in 1995.
- "Come to My Pod", "Oh Jonas" and "Please Remember" were recorded for Songs from the Black Hole, recorded in 1995.
- "The Prettiest Girl in the Whole Wide World" was recorded in 1997 during the band's hiatus as an early contender for 2001's Weezer (The Green Album). A new version ended up on Raditude as a bonus track.
- "I Was Scared" was recorded in 2003 as an early contender for Make Believe.
- "My Day is Coming" and "I Don't Wanna Let You Go" were recorded in 2006 and 2007, before the release of Weezer (The Red Album). "I Don't Wanna Let You Go" ended up as the closing track the Weezer's 2009 album Raditude.
- "Can't Stop Partying" was written by Jermaine Dupri with additional work and writing by Cuomo, and was demoed in 2008. A version of the song appeared on Weezer's studio album Raditude featuring Lil Wayne.
- "Cold and Damp" was recorded in 1999.

== Track listing ==
No.	Title	Length
1.	"Victory on the Hill"	0:50
2.	"I Want To Take You Home Tonight"	3:56
3.	"The Purification of Water"	3:56
4.	"I Was Scared"	2:54
5.	"Harvard Blues"	0:31
6.	"My Brain is Working Overtime"	3:27
7.	"I Don't Want to Let You Go"	3:46
8.	"Oh, Jonas!"	0:27
9.	"Please Remember"	0:37
10.	"Come To My Pod"	1:31
11.	"Don't Worry, Baby (The Beach Boys Cover)"	2:58
12.	"The Prettiest Girl In The Whole Wide World"	2:44
13.	"Can't Stop Partying (Acoustic Version)"	2:18
14.	"Paper Face"	3:20
15.	"Walt Disney"	2:50
16.	"I Admire You So Much"	0:46
17.	"My Day Is Coming"	4:23
18.	"Cold and Damp"	3:35
19.	"I'll Think About You"	3:01
Total length:		58:49
