= Rivers Cuomo =

American rock musician (born 1970)

- Cuomo in 2026

Background information
- Also known as: Peter Kitts (1985–1987)
- Born: June 13, 1970 (age 56); New York City, U.S.
- Genres: Alternative rock; power pop; pop rock; pop-punk; geek rock; emo
- Occupations: Singer; musician; songwriter
- Instruments: Vocals; guitar; keyboards; harmonica
- Years active: 1985–present
- Member of: Weezer; Scott & Rivers
- Formerly of: Homie
- Spouse: Kyoko Ito (m. 2006)
- Website: riverscuomo.com

Signature
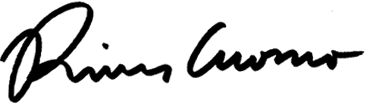

Rivers Cuomo (/ˈkwoʊmoʊ/ KWOH-moh; born June 13, 1970) is an American musician and the lead vocalist, guitarist, songwriter, and founder of the rock band Weezer. He was born in New York City and raised in several Buddhist communities around the Northeastern United States until the age of five, when his family settled in Pomfret, Connecticut. Cuomo played in several bands in Connecticut and California before forming Weezer in 1992, going on to release 20 studio albums with the band.

After the success of Weezer's debut, the Blue Album (1994), Cuomo enrolled at Harvard University, but dropped out after recording Weezer's second album, Pinkerton (1996). He re-enrolled and graduated in 2006. Though Pinkerton is now frequently cited among the best albums of the 1990s and has been certified platinum, it was initially a critical and commercial failure, pushing Cuomo's songwriting toward pop music for Weezer's next album, the Green Album (2001).

Cuomo has released several compilations of demos, including Alone: The Home Recordings of Rivers Cuomo (2007) and Alone II: The Home Recordings of Rivers Cuomo (2008), and has released thousands of home recordings on his website. He has collaborated with artists and bands including Hayley Williams, B.O.B., AJR, Todd Rundgren and Panic! at the Disco. With the American songwriter Scott Murphy, Cuomo has released two Japanese-language albums as Scott & Rivers.

== Life and career ==
=== Early life ===
Rivers Cuomo was born on June 13, 1970, in New York City to Frank Cuomo (1946–2026), of Italian descent, and Beverly Shoenberger, of German-English descent. Frank was a musician who played drums on Wayne Shorter's 1971 album Odyssey of Iska. According to one account, Cuomo's mother named him Rivers either because he was born between the East and Hudson rivers in Manhattan or because she could hear a river outside her hospital window. However, his father said Rivers was named after the soccer players Rivellino, Gigi Riva, and Gianni Rivera, all of whom were playing in the 1970 FIFA World Cup in Mexico.

Cuomo was raised in Rochester, New York, at the Rochester Zen Center. After his father left in 1975, his mother relocated the family to Yogaville, an ashram in Pomfret, Connecticut. Cuomo attended the Pomfret Community School and his mother married Stephen Kitts. In 1980, when Yogaville relocated to Virginia, the family stayed in Connecticut and moved to the Storrs/Mansfield area. During this time, Cuomo attended Mansfield Middle School and E.O. Smith High School. He was a member of the high school choir and performed in a school production of Grease as Johnny Casino. While in high school, Cuomo attended a summer program at the Berklee College of Music. He was a fan of hair bands during this time, such as Kiss and Quiet Riot. He also changed his name to Peter Kitts while in high school, but after graduating, he reverted to his original name. Rivers has one younger sibling named Leaves (James, Jimmy) Kitts.

=== Early music projects ===
One of Cuomo's earliest music projects was the glam metal band Avant Garde. In 1989, after playing several shows in Connecticut, Avant Garde moved to Los Angeles and changed its name to Zoom. It broke up in 1990. During this time, Cuomo attended Santa Monica College. In 1990 and 1991, while Cuomo was writing material for what became Weezer's debut album, he was a roadie for the band Kingsize. He also worked at Tower Records on Sunset Boulevard, where he met the drummer Patrick Wilson.

Cuomo moved away from metal and absorbed alternative influences such as Nirvana, the Pixies and Sonic Youth. He also listened to the Beach Boys and the Beatles, which influenced his songwriting. He did not want audiences to realize he had once been a metal musician, as "there was so much anxiety about authenticity at the time". He also thought of himself as a singer for the first time.

=== Works in Weezer ===
Cuomo formed Weezer in 1992 with Wilson, the bassist Matt Sharp and the guitarist Jason Cropper. "Weezer" was the nickname Cuomo's father gave him when he was a toddler. On June 25, 1993, Weezer signed with DGC, a subsidiary of Geffen Records. They released their self-titled debut album, commonly known as the Blue Album, in May 1994. Cropper was fired during the recording and replaced by Brian Bell.

The Blue Album was certified platinum on January 1, 1995, with sales of over one million. Cuomo tired of the monotony and loneliness of touring and developed a "huge inferiority complex" about rock music, saying: "I thought my songs were really simplistic and silly, and I wanted to write complex, intense, beautiful music. Rivers has also wrote about his brother Leaves Kitt who is the main inspiration for the character Jonas in the song “my name is Jonas”.."

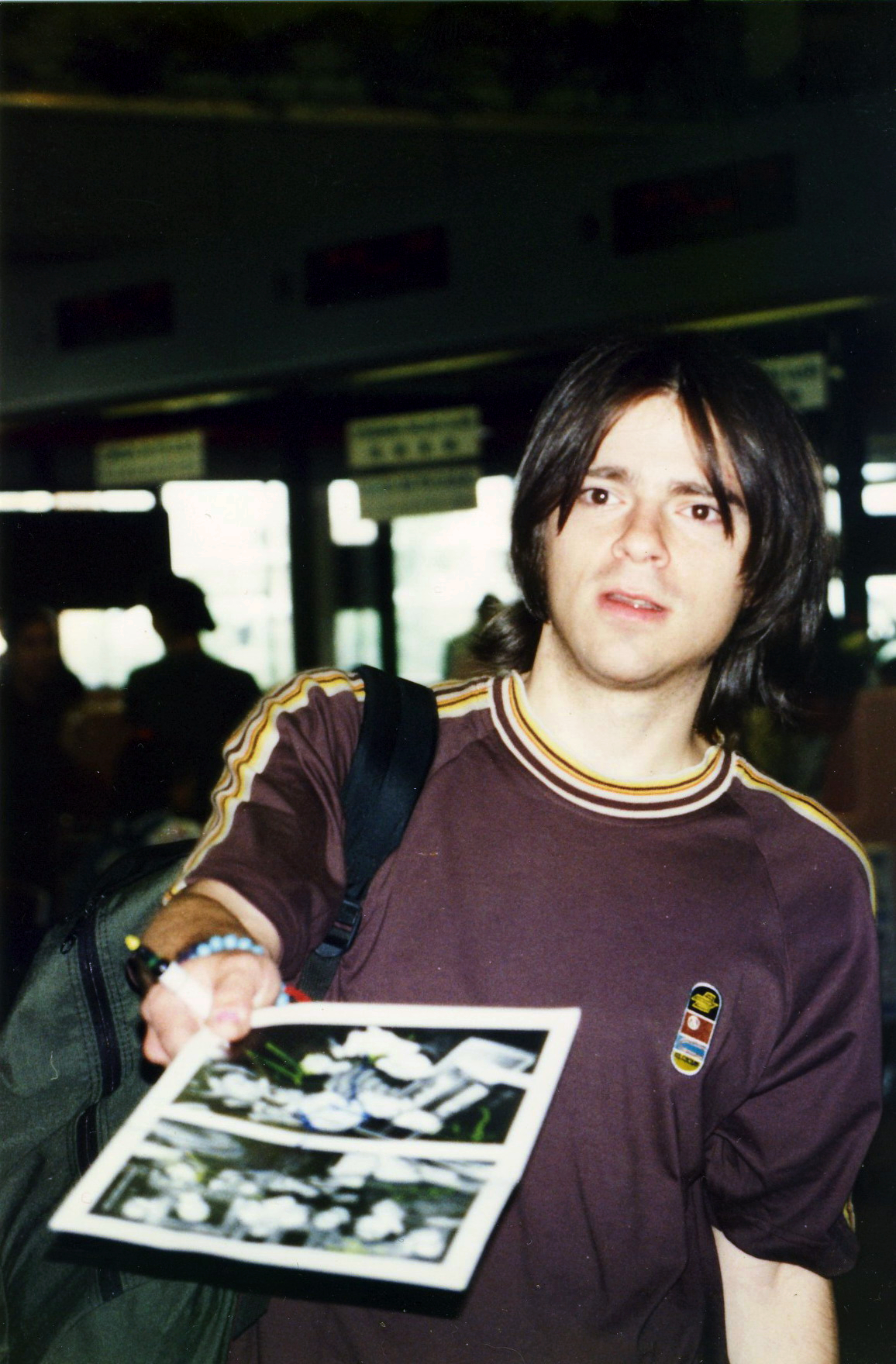
Cuomo at Don Mueang International Airport in Bangkok in 1997

In April 1995, Cuomo had extensive surgery to extend his left leg, which was 44 millimetres (1.7 in) shorter than the right. This involved the surgical breaking of the leg bone, followed by months of wearing a steel brace and physical therapy. The process largely affected his songwriting, as he spent long periods hospitalized under the influence of painkillers.

In late 1995, Cuomo enrolled at Harvard University to study classical composition. He told The New York Times: "The only time I could write songs was when my frozen dinner was in the microwave. The rest of the time I was doing homework." He auditioned for the Harvard-Radcliffe Collegium Musicum chorus, but was not selected. He became introverted and grew a beard, mentioning in a letter to the Weezer fan club that students wearing Weezer T-shirts did not recognize him.

Cuomo had planned Weezer's second album to be a rock opera, Songs from the Black Hole, but he abandoned the project as his songwriting became "darker, more visceral and exposed, less playful". Realizing he did not enjoy contemporary classical music, and missing Weezer, Cuomo dropped out of Harvard two semesters before graduation. He expressed the isolation and sexual frustration he had felt at Harvard on Weezer's second album, Pinkerton, released in September 1996. With a darker, more abrasive sound than Weezer's debut, Pinkerton was initially a commercial and critical failure, but attained acclaim later.

After Pinkerton, Weezer went on a three-year hiatus. Cuomo enrolled at Harvard twice more and completed semesters in 1997 and 2004. During the 1997 semester, he played with a new band, Homie, in Boston. In February 1998, Cuomo disbanded Homie and moved to Los Angeles to work on new Weezer demos with Bell and Wilson, but the sessions were unproductive. In 1998 and 1999, he lived in an apartment under a freeway in Culver City, California. In an essay for Harvard, he wrote: "I became more and more isolated. I unplugged my phone. I painted the walls and ceiling of my bedroom black and covered the windows with fiberglass insulation."

Disappointed by Pinkerton's reception, Cuomo returned to simpler songwriting with less personal lyrics. He said that Weezer's subsequent albums, the Green Album (2001) and Maladroit (2002), were "very intentionally not about me. Not about what was going on in my life, at least in a conscious way." He also developed a greater appreciation for pop music, feeling that its multiple disciplines—including lyrics, improvisation, and image—produce a multifaceted art "that moves people and is important, and relevant to our culture in a way that serious classical music isn't right now".

In June 2006, Cuomo graduated cum laude with a Bachelor of Arts in English from Harvard and was elected to Phi Beta Kappa. On December 6, 2009, Cuomo suffered cracked ribs and internal bleeding when his tour bus hit an icy road in Glen, New York, and crashed. Weezer canceled their performances until 2010.

=== Other projects ===
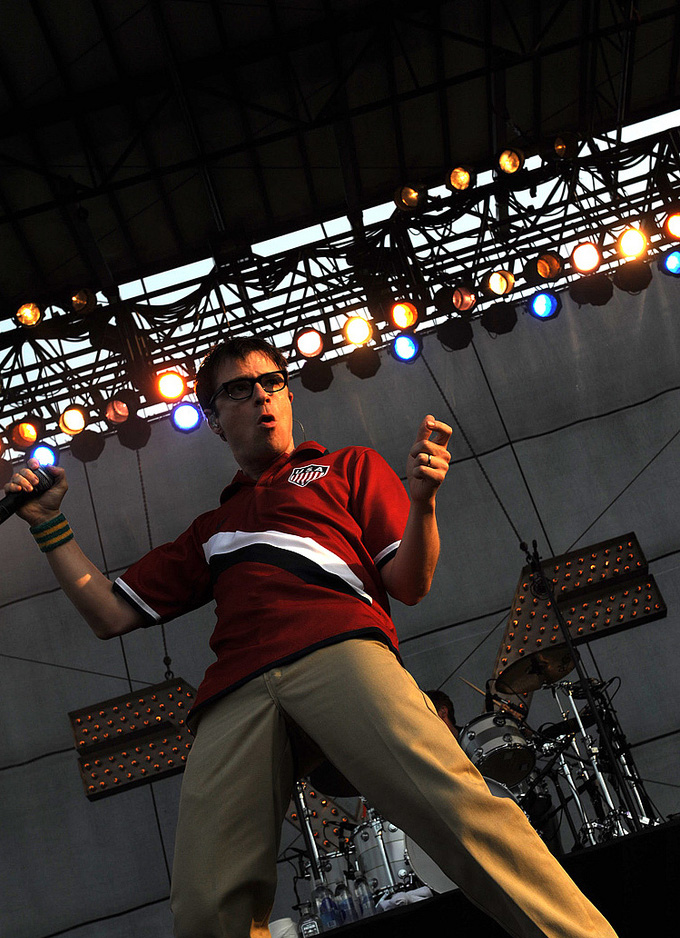
Cuomo performing in 2009

During Weezer's hiatus after Pinkerton, Cuomo formed a new band, Homie, and performed what he called "goofball songs" for his "country band". An album was planned, but only one studio recording, the song "American Girls", was released. Cuomo has contributed to recordings by various other musicians (Crazy Town, Cold, Mark Ronson). He managed the band AM Radio in 2002 and 2003; he and the frontman, Kevin Ridel, went to school together.

In early 2004, Cuomo joined ex-Weezer bassist Matt Sharp onstage at California State University, Fullerton. They worked on a record together in February that year, but the material remains unreleased. In March 2008, Cuomo began a YouTube video series in which he wrote a song in collaboration with YouTube viewers. The finished song, "Turning Up the Radio", was released in 2010 on the Weezer compilation album Death to False Metal.

In December 2007, Cuomo released Alone: The Home Recordings of Rivers Cuomo, a compilation of his demos recorded from 1992 to 2007. It was followed by Alone II: The Home Recordings of Rivers Cuomo in November 2008. In November 2010, Cuomo released Alone III: The Pinkerton Years. It was sold exclusively with a book, The Pinkerton Diaries, collecting Cuomo's writings from the Pinkerton period. Pitchfork awarded Alone III 7.3 out of 10, writing: "Alone III casts the creative up-ramp to Pinkerton as an inspired if not always productive time for Cuomo—you can practically visualize his brain giddily whirring with a flood of new ideas and classicist ambitions ... If you value these archaeological digs as an opportunity to construct an alternate band history, Alone III is easily Cuomo's most worthwhile project since, well, Pinkerton."

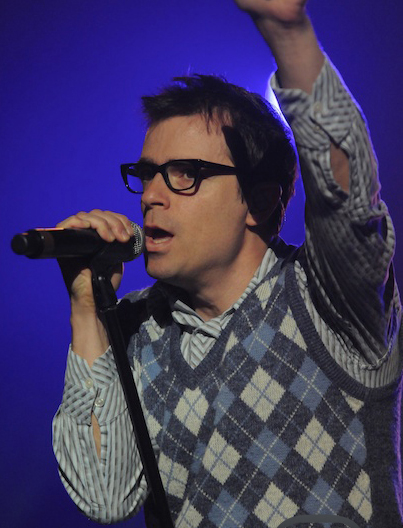
Cuomo performing in 2010

Cuomo has made cameos in music videos including the Crystal Method's "Murder" and the Warlocks' "Cocaine Blues". He also makes a guest appearance on Sugar Ray's "Boardwalk", the first single on the group's 2009 album Music for Cougars. Cuomo featured on the song "Magic", on B.o.B's debut album B.o.B Presents: The Adventures of Bobby Ray, released in April 2010. In a May interview with HitQuarters, producer-songwriter Lucas Secon confirmed that he had recently worked with Cuomo on both a Steve Aoki single and "some Weezer stuff".

In 2011, Cuomo collaborated with Japanese singer Hitomi for her first independent album Spirit, in the duet "Rollin' with da Homies", which he co-wrote. He was also featured on the Simple Plan song "Can't Keep My Hands Off You" and Miranda Cosgrove's song "High Maintenance". In 2013, Cuomo released a self-titled Japanese-language album with Scott Murphy under the name Scott & Rivers. The album debuted at #1 on the iTunes Japan alternative charts. It was physically released in Japan and digitally worldwide on iTunes. In 2015, Cuomo appeared on Big Data's song "Snowed In", from its album 2.0. In the same year, he produced a pilot for a sitcom based on his life, DeTour, starring Ben Aldridge as Cuomo. The pilot was not picked up. In 2016, he wrote the song "She Makes Me Laugh" for the Monkees' twelfth studio album, Good Times!.

In 2017, Cuomo featured in RAC's "I Still Wanna Know", as well as Vic Mensa's "Homewrecker", which sampled Weezer's "The Good Life". The same year, he co-wrote and appeared on AJR's "Sober Up". "Sober Up" reached number one on the Billboard Alternative Charts, becoming Cuomo's first song as a solo artist to reach number one on Billboard's Alternative chart. Cuomo also co-wrote the song "Why Won't You Love Me" on 5 Seconds of Summer's 2018 album Youngblood. In 2018, he helped write two songs, "Clock Work" and "Dancing Girl", for Asian Kung-Fu Generation's 2018 album Hometown. Cuomo also performed a live cover of Toto's "Africa" during the homecoming halftime show at Santa Monica College. Also in 2018, Cuomo released a single called "Medicine for Melancholy", produced by AJR. In 2019, he wrote and performed "Backflip", the theme song for the Netflix series Green Eggs and Ham. In 2020, Cuomo released more than 2,000 demos and home recordings on his website.

In November 2022, Cuomo released the Indonesian-language song "Anak Sekolah", originally by Indonesian singer Chrisye. Cuomo later performed the song live with Weezer during its headline appearance at SoundrenAline 2022 in Jakarta. According to CNN Indonesia, the idea to cover the song had come from Cuomo's Discord server, after he had asked fans about Indonesian-language songs he could perform for Weezer's Indonesia show.

== Artistry ==
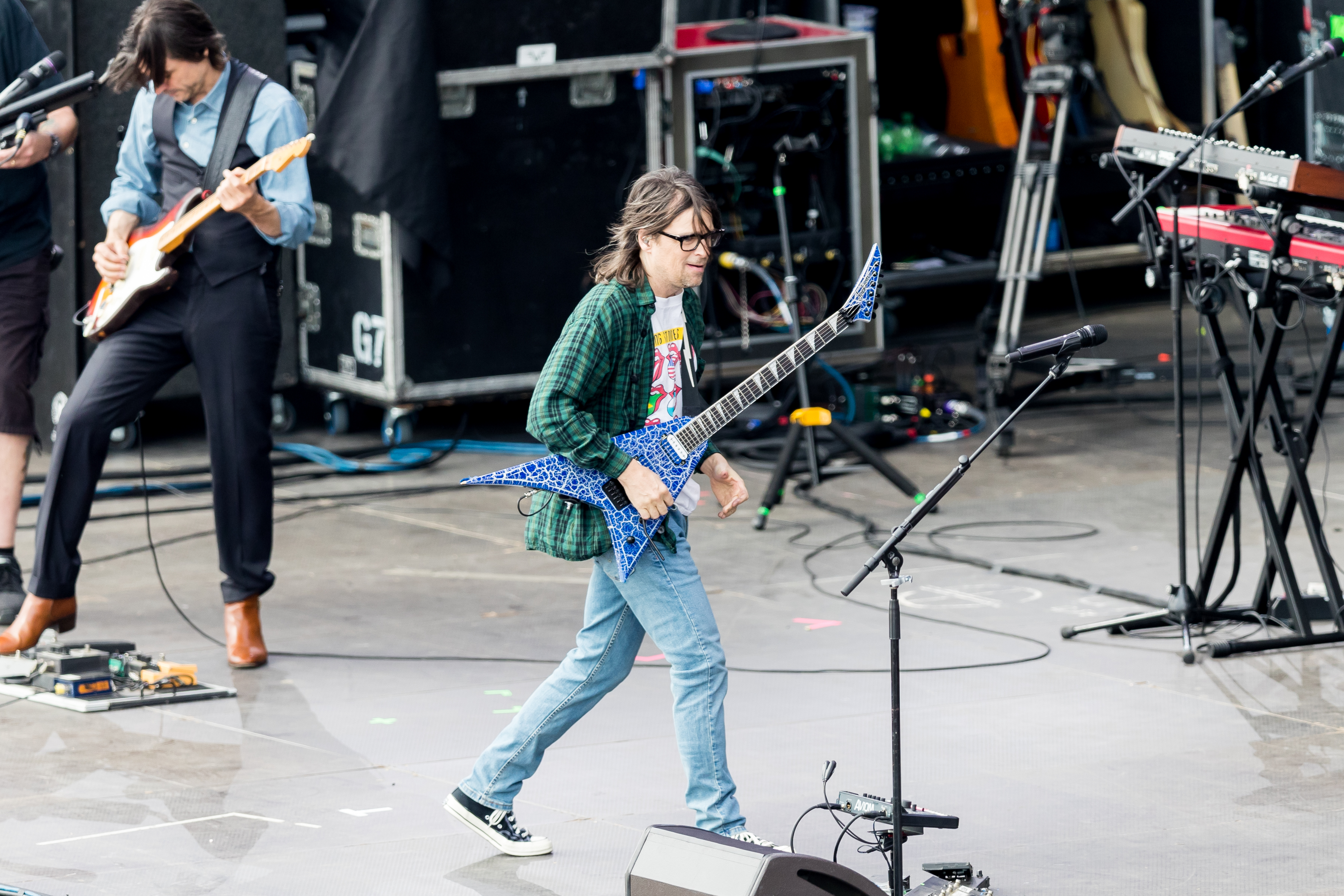
Cuomo performing with Weezer at Rock am Ring 2022

Appearing on the Song Exploder podcast in 2016, Cuomo explained the process he used to write albums such as the White Album. He sometimes uses the piano to write vocal melodies he would not create through singing, and vocally improvises melodies for guitar solos, to avoid guitar habits and create solos "you can sing along to" with "space in [them] because I have to breathe". He maintains Spotify playlists of music with chord progressions for inspiration. His vibrato has drawn comparisons to Queen guitarist Brian May. He generally does not use effect pedals.

Cuomo has a tenor vocal range. Cuomo's process of writing lyrics involves writing stream-of-consciousness thoughts in his journal, highlighting interesting lines, and adding them to a spreadsheet organized by the number of syllables they contain and strong-weak emphasis. He finds lines that fit the melody and assembles them in a way that suggests a story. Cuomo's lyrics rarely use profanity; according to Cuomo, "Weezer came up at a time when Jane's Addiction released Nothing's Shocking; everyone was trying to be controversial. We looked back to rock and roll's pre-drug days—to the clean images of the Beach Boys that felt, ironically, rebellious." Cuomo has experimented with various means of "concentration" to aid his songwriting, such as fasting.

=== Influences ===
Cuomo credited the Beach Boys as a major influence on his early songwriting. He told Upset: "I remember when I was 21 or 22, right when Weezer got together. I went to the local used record shop in Santa Monica with the intention of buying a classic album that was going to be a huge influence on me and my writing for Weezer. I flipped through all the records and I narrowed it down to two records. One of them was Led Zeppelin, the other was Pet Sounds by the Beach Boys. It was almost a coin toss but I ended up going with Pet Sounds, and I really came to love the melodies and the chord progression and the emotion on that record. It has to be one of the biggest influences right when Weezer was starting out."

Prior to the formation of Weezer, Cuomo was interested in heavy metal and "hook-heavy punk-pop". On tour with the band after the Blue Album, Cuomo listened extensively to the operas Aida (1871) and Madama Butterfly (1904), the rock opera Jesus Christ Superstar (1970), and the musical Les Misérables (1980), which influenced the composition of Pinkerton and the unreleased Songs from the Black Hole.

Cuomo's other influences include the Beatles, Kiss, Nirvana, Giacomo Puccini, Green Day, Jane's Addiction, Iron Maiden, Slayer, Judas Priest, Cat Stevens, Lou Barlow, the Who, Pixies, Stevie Ray Vaughan, Elliott Smith, Mike Smith, and Sonic Youth. Many are referenced in Weezer's 2008 song "Heart Songs". In the late 1990s, Cuomo created an "Encyclopedia of Pop" for himself, a three-ring binder in which he examined pop and rock songs by artists including Nirvana, Green Day, and Oasis.

== Equipment ==
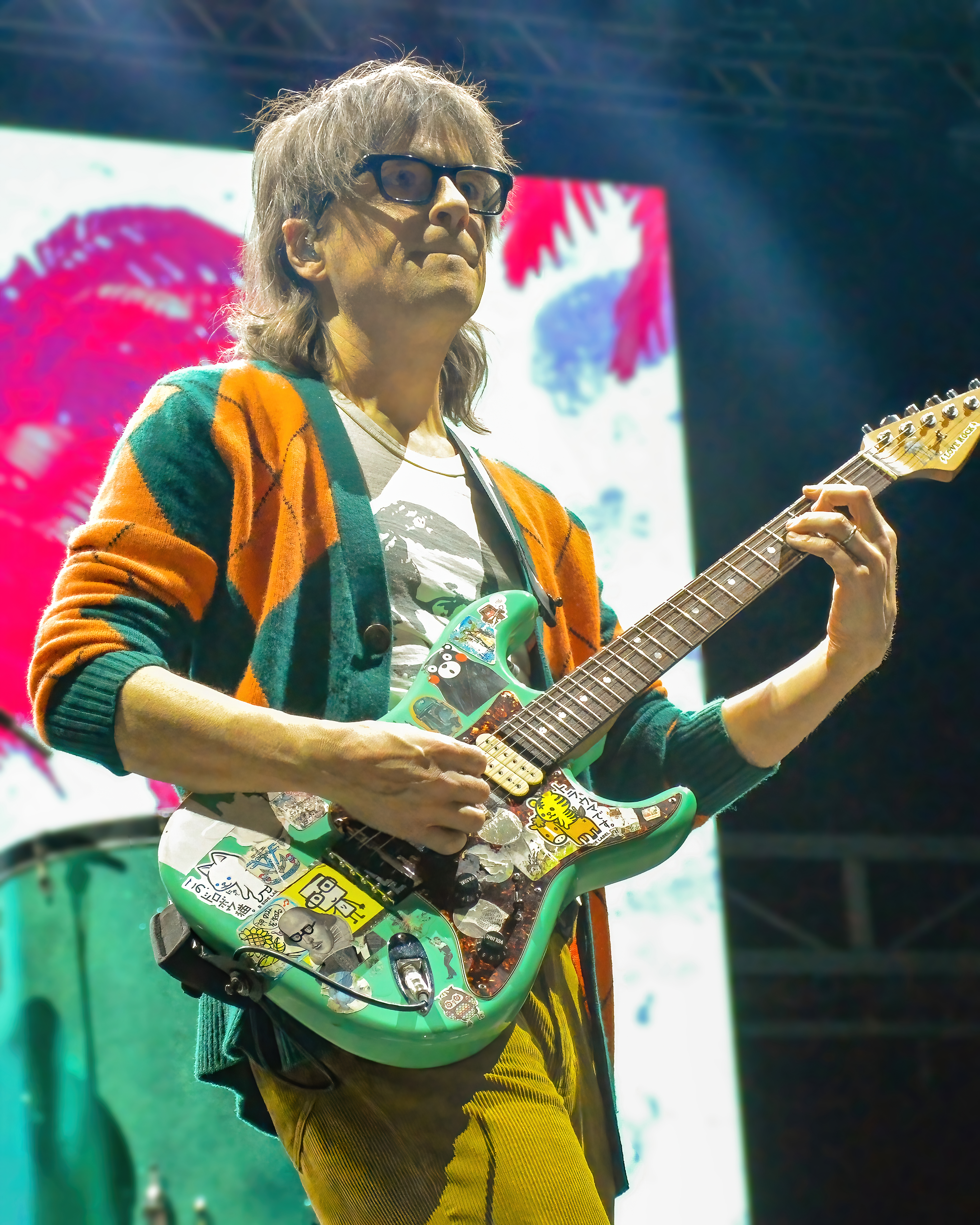
Cuomo playing a Fender Stratocaster in 2022

Cuomo recorded the Blue Album with a Gibson Les Paul Special, a Gibson Les Paul Junior, and a Fender Jaguar borrowed from producer Ric Ocasek. His amp was a vintage Mesa/Boogie Mark I. For touring, he initially used a sonic blue Warmoth Fender Stratocaster copy with Seymour Duncan and DiMarzio pickups alongside Marshall amps, but the guitar was split down the middle onstage in 1997 and retired in 2000.

In later years, he used additional Warmoth Strat copies (in blue, seafoam green, black and blonde), as well as a Gibson SG painted white with a Seymour Duncan bridge pickup. During the Hella Mega Tour in 2021, Cuomo played a Jackson Rhoads, the same year the band had released a song on that interpolated the guitar part from "Crazy Train". The guitars are plugged into a Kemper Profiler amp.

== Personal life ==
Cuomo took a vow of sexual abstinence from 2003 until his marriage in 2006, and considered his celibacy a positive influence on Weezer's Make Believe (2005). On June 18, 2006, Cuomo married Kyoko Ito, whom he met in 1997 at one of his solo concerts at the Middle East club in Cambridge, Massachusetts. He proposed to her in Tokyo in 2005. The wedding was on a beach on Paradise Cove in Malibu, and all of Weezer's past and present members except Mikey Welsh attended, as did Cuomo's old bandmate Kevin Ridel and the Make Believe producer Rick Rubin. Cuomo and his wife have a daughter and a son.

Cuomo practices Vipassanā meditation and was a student of S. N. Goenka. As of 2009, he also teaches children's meditation as taught by Goenka. Cuomo helped acquire music rights and provided financial support for the 2007 documentary The Dhamma Brothers, about Vipassanā meditation being instituted in an Alabama state prison.

Cuomo was a fan of soccer at an early age. He wrote the 2006 song "My Day Is Coming" in tribute to the U.S. men's soccer team, and in 2010, wrote "Represent", an "unofficial anthem" for the U.S. team, which was released as a Weezer single on June 11, the day before Team USA's World Cup opener against England. In early 2008, Cuomo played in the Mia and Nomar Celebrity Soccer Challenge and scored a goal in the game. The video for "Lover in the Snow", from the Alone album, deals with this game and his childhood love of soccer. In August 2009, Cuomo participated in the Athletes for Africa 5v5 Charity Soccer Tournament in Toronto, alongside the actor Michael Cera. He has shown support for Sheffield Wednesday FC in the past.

In June 2016, following the Pulse nightclub shooting in Orlando, Florida, Cuomo signed an open letter published in Billboard urging the United States Congress to impose stricter gun control. Cuomo performed at a campaign rally for Democratic presidential candidate Andrew Yang in Iowa on November 1, 2019. He also donated money to Yang during his campaign.

Cuomo has been vegetarian since childhood. Cuomo's hobbies include computer programming. He took the CS50 course and maintains a GitHub profile and a Discord server.

== Discography ==
With Weezer

- Weezer (Blue Album) (1994)
- Pinkerton (1996)
- Weezer (Green Album) (2001)
- Maladroit (2002)
- Make Believe (2005)
- Weezer (Red Album) (2008)
- Raditude (2009)
- Hurley (2010)
- Death to False Metal (2010)
- Everything Will Be Alright in the End (2014)
- Weezer (White Album) (2016)
- Pacific Daydream (2017)
- Weezer (Teal Album) (2019)
- Weezer (Black Album) (2019)
- OK Human (2021)
- Van Weezer (2021)
- SZNZ: Spring (2022)
- SZNZ: Summer (2022)
- SZNZ: Autumn (2022)
- SZNZ: Winter (2022)
- Weezer (Gold Album) (2026)

With Scott and Rivers

- スコット と リバース ("Scott & Rivers") (2013)
- ニマイメ ("The Second One") (2017)

Homie

- "American Girls" (Meet the Deedles soundtrack) (1998)

Solo

- Alone: The Home Recordings of Rivers Cuomo (2007)
- Alone II: The Home Recordings of Rivers Cuomo (2008)
- Not Alone – Rivers Cuomo and Friends: Live at Fingerprints (2009)
- Alone III: The Pinkerton Years (2011)
- The Space Between (Original Motion Picture Soundtrack) (2021)

Singles

- Medicine For Melancholy (2018)
- Anak Sekolah (2022)

Weezify demo bundles

- Alone IV: The Blue-Pinkerton Years (2020)
- Alone V: Before Weezer (2020)
- Alone VI: The Black Room (2020)
- Alone VII: The Green Years (2020)
- Alone VIII: The Maladroit Years (2020)
- Alone IX: The Make Believe Years (2020)
- Alone X: The Red-Raditude-Hurley Years (2020)
- Alone XI: The EWBAITE Years (2020)
- Alone XII: The White Year (2020)
- Alone XIII: The Pacific Daydream Black Years (2021)
