= The Night Is Short, Walk On Girl =

2017 animated film directed by Masaaki Yuasa

- Theatrical release poster

Japanese name
- Japanese: 夜は短し歩けよ乙女
- Literal meaning: The night is short, so walk on, maiden
Transcriptions
- Revised Hepburn: Yoru wa Mijikashi Aruke yo Otome
- Directed by: Masaaki Yuasa
- Screenplay by: Makoto Ueda
- Based on: The Night Is Short, Walk On Girl by Tomihiko Morimi
- Produced by: Noriko Ozaki; Jūnosuke Itō
- Starring: Gen Hoshino; Kana Hanazawa; Hiroshi Kamiya; Ryuji Akiyama (Robert); Kazuya Nakai; Yuhko Kaida; Hiroyuki Yoshino; Seiko Niizuma; Junichi Suwabe; Aoi Yuki; Nobuyuki Hiyama; Kazuhiro Yamaji; Mugihito
- Edited by: Akari Saitō
- Music by: Michiru Ōshima
- Production company: Science Saru
- Distributed by: Toho
- Release date: April 7, 2017
- Running time: 93 minutes
- Country: Japan
- Language: Japanese
- Box office: ¥530 million (Japan)

The Night Is Short, Walk On Girl (Japanese: 夜は短し歩けよ乙女, Hepburn: Yoru wa Mijikashi Aruke yo Otome) is a 2017 Japanese animated romantic comedy film directed by Masaaki Yuasa. The film is based on the 2006 novel written by Tomihiko Morimi and illustrated by Yusuke Nakamura, who also served as the film's original character designer. It has been awarded the Grand Prize for Best Animated Feature at the Ottawa International Animation Festival and the Japan Academy Prize for Animation of the Year.

The film is heavily inspired by The Tatami Galaxy, also based on a novel written by Morimi and directed by Yuasa. Though both works share a Kyoto University setting and some characters, the plotlines are largely unrelated.

== Plot ==
The film follows a night out for two university students: an unnamed woman – referred to as Kōhai (後輩; "Junior") throughout the film, and kurokami no otome (黒髪の乙女; "black-haired maiden") in the film's credits – and an unnamed man – referred to as Senpai (先輩; "Senior") in the film and its credits. The senpai plans to confess his romantic feelings for the kōhai to her that night, though circumstances keep them separated for a majority of the evening.

The kōhai meets a pervert, Tōdō, at a bar. She wins the admiration of two other patrons, Higuchi and Hanuki, after punching Tōdō when he makes an advance on her. Higuchi and Hanuki lead the kōhai in gate crashing strangers' parties, where she drinks an impressive amount of alcohol. She later participates in a drinking game with Rihaku, a supernatural being, and wins.

Meanwhile, the senpai and kōhai both go to a used book festival to search for a picture book from the kōhai's childhood. There, Rihaku is hosting a spicy food eating contest making used book enthusiasts compete to select a book from his rare collection. The senpai notices that kōhai's picture book is amongst the collection, and competes. He wins the book, but the contest is interrupted by the God of Used Book Festivals (aided by the kōhai) who redistributes all of Rihaku's books back to the festival at reasonable prices.

After obtaining the book, the senpai and the kōhai both go to the school festival. Senpai learns that the kōhai is to play the lead in the final scene of a guerilla theatre production. He attempts to replace the male lead in the scene, but is unsuccessful. Having caught a cold, the senpai returns home.

The kōhai visits the companions she has met throughout the night, all of whom have caught the same cold as the senpai, and nurses them back to health. Her final visit is to the senpai, who gives her the copy of Ratatatam and suggests visiting a used bookstore together, to which she enthusiastically assents. The film ends with the two meeting for coffee before going to the bookstore.

== Cast ==
Characters	Voice actor (Japanese)	Voice actor (English)
Senior	Gen Hoshino	Kellen Goff
The Girl with Black Hair	Kana Hanazawa	Jackie Lastra
The School Festival Executive Head	Hiroshi Kamiya	Eddy Lee
The Underpants Leader (Don Underwear)	Ryuji Akiyama (Robert)	Patrick Seitz
Seitarō Higuchi	Kazuya Nakai	Paul Guyet
Hanuki-san	Yuko Kaida	Carrie Keranen
The God of the Old Books Market	Hiroyuki Yoshino	Dino Andrade
Kiko-san	Seiko Niizuma	Jennifer Roberts
Nise-Jōgasaki	Junichi Suwabe	Michael Sinterniklaas
Princess Daruma	Aoi Yuki	Stephanie Sheh
Johnny	Nobuyuki Hiyama	Ben Pronsky
Tōdō-san	Kazuhiro Yamaji	Doug Erholtz
Rihaku	Mugihito	Frank Todaro

== Production ==
The film was made by most of the same lead staff as The Tatami Galaxy, including original author Morimi, original character designer Nakamura, character designer and chief supervising animator Nobutaki Itō, screenwriter Makoto Ueda and director Yuasa.

The band Asian Kung-Fu Generation also returned to write and perform the theme song "Kōya o Aruke" (荒野を歩け; lit. "Walk in the wild land").

To promote the film's release in South Korea, in addition the Korean band Romantic Punch were employed to create an image song, "Moonwalk in Kyoto" (밤은 짧아 걸어 아가씨야) (the Korean title of the song is the same as that of the novel and film).

== Release ==
The Night Is Short, Walk On Girl was released in Japan on April 7, 2017.

Internationally, the film was released by Anime Limited in the United Kingdom and Ireland on October 4, 2017, and by GKIDS in the United States on August 21, 2018 In Australia, Half Symbolic Films released the film in cinemas on 14 February 2019. An English dub of the film was released on HBO Max on January 12, 2021.

Rights to the English-language edition of the original novel have been acquired by Yen Press, who published it on June 18, 2019, as The Night Is Short, Walk On Girl, in hardcover and as an e-book.

In the United States, the home-video Blu-ray release of Night Is Short, Walk On Girl has earned an estimated total of $370,620 as of December 2021, per financials reported on The Numbers.

On June 17, 2022, The Night is Short, Walk on Girl screened at New York City's Japan Society (Manhattan) as part of their Monthly Anime Series.

== Reception ==
=== Critical reception ===
On review aggregator Rotten Tomatoes, the film holds a 90% approval rating based on 31 reviews, with an average rating of 7.3/10. The website's critics consensus reads, "Inventively animated, boldly creative, and refreshingly ambitious, The Night Is Short, Walk On Girl should resonate deeply with fans of outré anime." Metacritic, which uses a weighted average, assigned the film a score of 65 out of 100 based on 7 critics, indicating "generally favorable reviews".

=== Awards and nominations ===
Award	Category	Nominee	Result
41st Ottawa International Animation Festival	Best Animated Feature	Night Is Short, Walk On Girl	Won
50th Sitges Film Festival	Best Animated Film	Night Is Short, Walk On Girl	Nominated
41st Japan Academy Prize	Animation of the Year	Night Is Short, Walk On Girl	Won
3rd Crunchyroll Anime Awards	Best Film	Night Is Short, Walk On Girl	Nominated
