= Meet the Deedles =

1998 film by Steve Boyum

- Theatrical release poster
- Directed by: Steve Boyum
- Written by: Jim Herzfeld
- Produced by: Dale Pollock; Aaron Meyerson
- Starring: Paul Walker; Steve Van Wormer; John Ashton; A. J. Langer; Robert Englund; Dennis Hopper
- Cinematography: David Hennings
- Edited by: Alan Cody
- Music by: Steve Bartek
- Production companies: DIC Entertainment; Peak Productions
- Distributed by: Buena Vista Pictures Distribution (Note: Distributed under the Walt Disney Pictures banner.)
- Release date: March 27, 1998 (United States)
- Running time: 93 minutes
- Country: United States
- Language: English
- Budget: $24 million
- Box office: $4.4 million

Meet the Deedles is a 1998 American comedy film directed by Steve Boyum in his directorial debut, and starring Paul Walker and Steve Van Wormer as two twin surfers, Stew and Phil Deedle, reprimanded by their father, mistakenly land at Yellowstone Park as recruiters but bigger problems await them including fighting Frank Slater (Dennis Hopper), an ex-ranger. This was the first live-action film by DIC Entertainment.

Released theatrically by Buena Vista Pictures under its Walt Disney Pictures label in the United States on March 27, 1998, the film was universally panned by critics. It was also a box-office bomb, grossing only $4.4 million against a $24 million budget.

== Plot ==
Fraternal twin brothers Phil and Stew Deedle live in Hawaii and enjoy a life of leisure living off of their father Elton's hard earned wealth. After they are reported truant from school so they could enjoy a surf session on their 18th birthday, the school expels them. Frustrated with their laziness, Elton enrolls them in a boot camp at Yellowstone National Park, to the horror of the boys.

Arriving on the mainland, they learn that the bootcamp has been shuttered due to lawsuits and the former owner, Major Flowers, intends to give them survival training on his own. En route to their camp he accidentally drives them over a cliff, ejecting them from the vehicle. Believing he killed the brothers, Flowers disappears into the forest. Phil and Stew steal clothing from a nearby campsite and proceed downhill by luge to the nearby ranger station. After a collision with the park sign, the responding park rangers misidentify the brothers by the names "Mel" and "Mo" written on clothing tags that they took earlier.

The brothers awaken in the hospital and assume the identities they had been given, learning that Mel and Mo were expected by the station as two highly touted naturalist recruits to the National Park Service. As they adjust to life at Yellowstone, they struggle to adopt Mel and Mo's apparent foraging lifestyle, while also feebly attempting to accomplish their job as best as they can. Along the way, Phil develops a mutual attraction with Jesse, a Lieutenant at the station and the stepdaughter of the park's commanding ranger Captain Pine, earning both the brothers Pine's ire.

Eventually the brothers discover that a disgruntled former park ranger, Frank Slater, has masterminded a plan to divert the hydrologic process of Old Faithful through a series of underground pipes into an extinct geyser on land that he owns, ultimately creating a new park that would rival Yellowstone. Slater intends to implement his plan during an anniversary celebration for Old Faithful in hopes that he publicly humiliates Pine in the process.

Later the real Mel and Mo arrive at the ranger station after being waylaid by various mishaps, and they expose the Deedles as imposters. This upsets Jesse and Captain Pine, leading to the brother's expulsion from the park. Despite this, they still set out to stop Slater from going through with his plan and attempt to infiltrate his base. When they parachute onto his land, they are immediately taken underground to Slater. There, with the help of a prairie dog they befriended earlier, they don protective heat suits and halt the diversion of superheated water to Slater's geyser "New Faithful" and restore Old Faithful. This causes a reaction that creates an explosion on Slater's land, creating a natural wave pool where visitors can surf.

Slater and his two henchmen Nemo & Crabbe are arrested for their crimes, Phil reconciles with Jesse and the brothers are reinstated into the Park Service. Elton arrives and expresses his pride in their accomplishments, and the brothers along with Jesse go surfing in the newly created park attraction Deedlestone.

In a post-credits scene, Mel, Mo, Ludwig and Ludwig's circus bear Otto goes to surfing.

== Cast ==
- Paul Walker as Phil Deedle, Stew's fraternal twin brother
- Steve Van Wormer as Stew Deedle, Phil's fraternal twin brother
- John Ashton as Captain Douglas Pine
- A. J. Langer as Lieutenant Jesse Ryan, Douglas's stepdaughter and Phil's love interest
- Robert Englund as Nemo, Slater's henchman
- Megan Cavanagh as Mo, Mel's sister
- Eric Braeden as Elton Deedle, Phil & Stew's father
- M. C. Gainey as Major Ed Flower
- Dennis Hopper as Frank Slater, Douglas's rival
- Richard Lineback as Crabbe, Slater's other henchman
- Ana Gasteyer as Mel, Mo's sister
- Michael Ruud as Ringmaster Ludwig, the owner of Ludwig's Bavarian Circus
- Hattie Winston as Jo-Claire
- Bart the Bear as Otto the Circus Bear
- Tai as Circus Elephant
- Josef the Lion as Circus Lion

The film also features cameos from former Oingo Boingo members Steve Bartek, Johnny "Vatos" Hernandez, Carl Graves, and Sam "Sluggo" Phipps as the band at the luau.

The film marked the last feature film appearance of the original Bart the Bear, who became ill in 1998 and died in 2000. He was trained by Heber City, Utah's Wasatch Rocky Mountain Wildlife employees.

== Production ==
In May 1997, Paul Walker and Steve Van Wormer were cast to play the fraternal twin Deedle brothers directed by Steve Boyum from a script by Jim Herzfeld. The film was the first production from DIC Films in its production deal with Disney after DIC recently started a live-action feature division with the Disney deal. Disney agreed to distribute the film domestically as a negative pickup with Quadra handling foreign rights.

== Reception ==
On the review aggregator website Rotten Tomatoes, 10% of 29 critics' reviews are positive, with an average rating of 3.2/10. The website's consensus reads: "Audiences will be eager to lose The Deedles' number after suffering through this obnoxiously unfunny surfer comedy."

Reviews for the film were unanimously bad, claiming the film was nothing more than a poor attempt to revive the goofball duo genre of films, like Bill & Ted's Excellent Adventure, Wayne's World, and Dumb and Dumber. Areas of the film that drew the most criticism were its two-dimensional characters, overuse of surfer slang, ludicrous plot, and questionable morals. The film has since gone out of print, though it is available for streaming on Disney+ and Amazon Prime as of September 2025.

=== Box office ===
The movie was a box office bomb, only grossing $4.4 million against a $24 million budget.

== Soundtrack ==
Meet the Deedles: The Original Motion Picture Soundtrack

Soundtrack album by various artists
- Released: March 24, 1998
- Genres: Alternative pop; ska punk; surf rock; post-grunge; jazz; swing revival; pop-punk; lo-fi
- Length: 33:46
- Label: Mercury

The original music for the film was composed by former Oingo Boingo member Steve Bartek. Most of the songs featured on the soundtrack were from third-wave ska bands, as the genre was at the peak of its popularity at the time of the film's release. Notably, Weezer frontman Rivers Cuomo's band Homie had their only officially released song "American Girls" on the soundtrack.

1. "Wrong Thing Right Then" – The Mighty Mighty Bosstones
2. "Lady Luck" – Dance Hall Crashers
3. "Seems Like Yesterday" – Goldfinger
4. "Dr. Bones" – Cherry Poppin' Daddies
5. "I Can't Wait" – Hepcat
6. "Psycho Gremmie" – Gary Hoey
7. "For You" – Save Ferris
8. "Go Where You Go" – Geggy Tah
9. "Failing and Leaving" – Radish
10. "American Girls" – Homie
11. "Hawaii Five-O" – Perfect Thyroid
12. "Who Are Those Guys?" – Steve Bartek
