= Alone: The Home Recordings of Rivers Cuomo =

Compilation album by Rivers Cuomo
- Released: December 18, 2007
- Recorded: 1984, 1992–2007
- Genres: Alternative rock; emo; lo-fi
- Length: 45:38
- Label: Geffen

Rivers Cuomo chronology
| Alone: The Home Recordings of Rivers Cuomo (2007) | Alone II: The Home Recordings of Rivers Cuomo (2008) |

Singles from Alone: The Home Recordings of Rivers Cuomo
- 1. "Blast Off!" Released: 2008; 2. "Lover in the Snow" Released: 2008

Alone: The Home Recordings of Rivers Cuomo is a compilation album by American musician and Weezer frontman Rivers Cuomo. It was released on December 18, 2007, by Geffen Records. It is available as a digital release, CD release and 12" vinyl (released on January 8, 2008). The album features home demos that Cuomo has recorded from 1992 to 2007.

Alone: The Home Recordings of Rivers Cuomo leaked online on December 12, 2007. When released, it opened with sales of 14,000, and debuted at #163 on the US Billboard 200. The album also topped the Billboard Top Heatseekers chart. The album had sold 43,000 copies as of December 2008. It was followed by Alone II: The Home Recordings of Rivers Cuomo (2008) and Alone III: The Pinkerton Years (2011), and in 2020 Cuomo would begin releasing nearly every Weezer demo under the Alone name on his website for purchase.

== Background ==
Rivers Cuomo has long been known by fans to have recorded a great deal of unreleased material, nearly 800 songs in his lifetime. This material was recorded with Weezer, earlier bands, and self-recorded demos. Despite the large amount of unreleased material that has been made available by Cuomo on the internet, large chunks of his work remain unheard by fans. These include certain demos for The Blue Album, various songs from the scrapped Songs from the Black Hole project, over a hundred songs he composed and demoed throughout 1999 (songs which he has described as ranging from "drone-y Romantic," "abrasive dissonance" and "riffy pop-rock") and well over a hundred songs that didn't make the cut for Make Believe.

Cuomo brought up the idea for the compilation album to his record company in 1998. However, they discouraged him from the idea because they didn't want to "dilute the Weezer name" by putting out less polished material. It was not until 10 years later that Cuomo pushed harder for the collection and it gained enough support for a release.

There were some legal issues between Cuomo and Geffen about releasing the album:

[Legal issues] [were] a big part of it because the record company owns all of my demos under Weezer's contract, and my argument was that they aren't Weezer recordings; they're not part of the Weezer record deal, this is my own stuff, I should own this. So we had to negotiate for a long time to reach an agreement as to the legal ownership of the records but we agreed enough that we were able to move forward and put it out.

== Song selection ==
When deciding on the track listing, Cuomo listened to a great deal of his past recordings. He described choosing the songs to be very difficult. However, he knew very early in the process to include "Blast Off!" and other tracks from the aborted Songs from the Black Hole because of the well-known high demand from fans for these songs. "I knew 'Blast Off' and some of these other Songs from The Black Hole had to be on there, because for years Weezer fans have been wanting to hear these songs, and I knew if I put out the album without these songs on there, they would hunt me down and kill me." Cuomo also considered releasing the entire Songs from the Black Hole album, but felt it wasn't right considering most of the songs have been released anyway, either as songs on Pinkerton or otherwise:

I thought about it for a long time. I thought maybe I should release it as The Black Hole and put the demos in the right order, but like I said, it was never finished, so it wouldn't really stand up, like it wouldn't be a very good listen... It was a very tough decision, but in the end I concluded that this is the best possible CD I could put out, given all the material I have. This is the best listen and this is what I want to give to the world.

== Artwork and liner notes ==
The album's cover photo was taken by Weezer's webmaster, friend, and historian Karl Koch. It was taken in 1993 in a rehearsal studio during The Blue Album era. The original photograph featured Weezer guitarist Brian Bell, but he was cropped out for the album cover. Other photos were taken by Robert Fisher, Julie Kramer, Beverly Shoenberger, and by Cuomo himself. The pictures were taken during various periods of Cuomo's life.

While reviewing the album, Pitchfork's Jason Crock described the inside cover:

The inside cover shows off a crammed collection of cassette tapes, their spines promising untold treasures-- Songs From the Black Hole is there, as well as previously unheard of titles and bandnames-waiting-to-happen like Psoriasis Babies and Angst Muffins.

The album's liner notes featured detailed descriptions and offered much insight into where Cuomo draws inspiration to write and arrange his music, specifically stating the time and dates where songs were written. Pete Townshend of The Who is specifically thanked in the liner notes "for paving the way with his Scoop series."

== Music videos ==
On January 6, 2008, Cuomo announced on his MySpace blog that he would be making a video for the song "Blast Off!" The video, which also features Alone track "Ooh," premiered on January 11, 2008, on Yahoo!

On March 19, 2008, a music video for "Lover in the Snow" was released via Rivers' MySpace page.

== Reception ==
Professional ratings
Review scores
| Source | Rating |
|---|---|
| AllMusic | 4.5/5 stars |
| Billboard | favorable |
| IGN | (7.8/10) |
| musicOMH.com | 4/5 stars |
| Newsday | B |
| No Ripcord | 7/10 stars |
| Pitchfork | (7.2/10) |
| PopMatters | 7/10 stars |
| Rolling Stone | 2.5/5 stars |
| Spin | 3/5 stars |

Alone was positively received by critics. Highly praising the album, AllMusic gave the album four and a half stars out of five, stating, "...Alone will stand as an idiosyncratic gem in his catalog, showcasing him at his eccentric best." Pitchfork gave Alone a positive review, stating "[The Album] remind[s] us why we fell for dorks with horn-rimmed glasses and flying-V guitars in the first place,' and that, 'If nothing else, Alone reminds us that a lot of those over-ambitious, silly-on-paper ideas often blossomed in Cuomo's hands, and [that] there was more to Weezer in their early days than just crisp power-pop and cute videos.'" PopMatters claimed that the album featured "some of the strongest material that Cuomo has ever recorded."

== Additional archival recordings ==
On December 27, 2007, Cuomo stated "I would love to put out at least one more, I'm talking with the record company (now) to figure out what's the best way for me to get more of this stuff out, and if they're gonna be involved or not. But it's certainly my hope to put out as much of this stuff as I can."

Cuomo continued to release past recordings, beginning with Alone II.

== Track listing ==
All tracks are written by Rivers Cuomo, except where noted.

| No. | Title | Length |
|---|---|---|
| 1. | "Ooh" | 0:47 |
| 2. | "The World We Love So Much" (Gregg Alexander) | 3:39 |
| 3. | "Lemonade" (Cuomo, Patrick Wilson) | 2:31 |
| 4. | "The Bomb" (Ice Cube Cover) | 1:17 |
| 5. | "Buddy Holly" | 2:59 |
| 6. | "Chess" | 2:25 |
| 7. | "Longtime Sunshine" | 3:15 |
| 8. | "Blast Off!" | 1:57 |
| 9. | "Who You Callin' Bitch?" | 0:45 |
| 10. | "Wanda" | 3:37 |
| 11. | "Dude, We're Finally Landing" | 0:55 |
| 12. | "Superfriend" | 3:29 |
| 13. | "Lover In The Snow" | 3:16 |
| 14. | "Crazy One" | 3:13 |
| 15. | "This is the Way" | 4:16 |
| 16. | "Little Diane" (Dion) | 2:40 |
| 17. | "I Wish You Had an Axe Guitar" | 0:35 |
| 18. | "I Was Made for You" | 4:02 |
| Total length: | | 45:38 |

=== Track origins ===
All information is taken from the liner notes.

- Tracks 1–6 were recorded before the release of the band's debut album, Weezer (The Blue Album).
- Tracks 7–9, 11–12 were demos for Songs from the Black Hole, recorded in 1994 and 1995.
- Track 10 was recorded in 1995, originally intended for the movie Angus. The song was rejected by the film's producers. Weezer's "You Gave Your Love to Me Softly" was chosen instead.
- Tracks 13–14 were recorded in 1997 ("Lover in the Snow") and 1998 ("Crazy One") during Weezer's hiatus between Pinkerton and Weezer (The Green Album).
- Track 15 was considered for Weezer (The Red Album), but was ultimately omitted from the album.
- Track 16 was recorded in 2003 with members of Sloan.
- Track 17 is a recording of Rivers Cuomo and his friends talking about his favorite band Kiss in Summer 1984.
- Track 18 was written for Make Believe.

=== Changes from earlier versions ===
- "Lover in the Snow" was edited down from a previous version that leaked to the internet several years ago. Its total running time is 3:16, while the older version clocked in at 4:23. Only a few repeated sections of the song are edited.
- "Blast Off!" originally had the first part of the song "Who You Callin' Bitch?" but was edited to make the songs separate. There are also noticeable edits within the song, namely being the omission of the word "fine" in the second verse.

== Personnel ==
All information is taken from the liner notes.

- Rivers Cuomo – vocals, guitar, percussion, bass, piano, keyboards, clarinet, drums, photography
- Patrick Wilson – drums on "Lemonade".
- Sloan (Chris Murphy, Patrick Pentland, Jay Ferguson, Andrew Scott) – guitar, bass, drums on "Little Diane".
- Karl Koch – photography
- Todd Sullivan – A&R
- Stephen Marcussen – mastering
- Stewart Whitmore – digital editing
- Rich Mouser – digital editing
- Robert Fisher – photography
- Julie Kramer – photography
- Beverly Shoenberger – photography
